= Roger Vaughan (Hereford MP) =

English politician (c.1641–1672)

Roger Vaughan JP DL

Member of Parliament for Hereford
- In office 11 February 1662 – 28 May 1672 Serving with Herbert Westfaling
- Preceded by: Sir Henry Lingen; Herbert Westfaling
- Succeeded by: Herbert Westfaling; The Viscount Scudamore

Personal details
- Born: c. 1641
- Died: 28 May 1672 (aged 30–31)
- Spouse: Anne Tomkins (m. 1657)
- Relations: Henry Cornewall (half-brother); Walter Pye (grandfather)
- Children: 1
- Parent(s): Frances Pye; Henry Vaughan

Roger Vaughan JP DL (c. 1641 – 28 May 1672) was an English politician and courtier who was a Member of Parliament for Hereford.

== Early life ==
Vaughan was born c. 1641. He was the only son of Frances (née Pye) Vaughan (1621–1701) (a daughter of Sir Walter Pye) and Henry Vaughan, of Bredwardine, which his ancestors had held since at least the middle of the 15th century. His father sat on the Herefordshire committee during the Civil War until his death in 1644. From his mother's second marriage to Edward Cornewall of Moccas Court, he had a younger half-brother, Henry Cornewall, MP for Weobley.

== Career ==
Vaughan was a Justice of the Peace for Herefordshire from July 1660 until his death. He was a Commissioner for Assessment from August 1660 to 1669 before becoming a Deputy Lieutenant in 1669. He was also a Receiver of Hearth Tax from 1670 until his death.

He was Captain of Foot Admiralty Regiment from 1667 until his death. He served as groom of the bedchamber to the Duke of York (later King James II) from 1669 to 1671 and a gentleman of the privy chamber from 1671 until his death in 1672.

He was returned for Hereford at a by-election in 1662, taking the seat of his late uncle, Sir Henry Lingen.

Vaughan was not an active Member of the Cavalier Parliament, was known to have been appointed to only thirteen committees, and made no recorded speeches. His primary interests lay outside Parliament and he was included in lists of court supporters from 1669 to 1671. On the outbreak of the third Dutch war, Vaughan rejoined the fleet and was killed at the Battle of Solebay.

== Personal life ==
In 1657, he married his cousin Anne Tomkins, a daughter of Mary (née Pye) Tomkins and Sir Thomas Tomkins of Monnington on Wye. The marriage brought him Garnstone Manor, Weobley, as a dowry, which Vaughan was compelled to sell it to John Birch in 1661 to satisfy debts. They were the parents of one son who died young.

Vaughan was killed at the Battle of Solebay on 28 May 1672. "He left no heir, and died heavily in debt both to the crown and to private creditors. His half-brother Henry Cornewall took over the estate and paid off the debts."
