= Charles Cornewall =

Vice-Admiral of the Blue Charles Cornewall
- Born: Charles Cornewall; 1669; Eye, Herefordshire
- Died: 7 October 1718 (aged 48–49); Lisbon, Portugal
- Burial place: Westminster Abbey, London
- Military career
- Allegiance: England; Great Britain
- Branch: Royal Navy
- Service years: 1683–1718
- Rank: Vice-Admiral of the Blue
- Commands: HMS Portsmouth; HMS Adventure; HMS Plymouth; HMS Kent; HMS Shrewsbury; HMS Exeter; HMS Orford; HMS Dreadnought; Mediterranean Fleet
- Conflicts: Nine Years' War; War of the Spanish Succession; War of the Quadruple Alliance; Battle of Cape Passaro

Vice-Admiral of the Blue Charles Cornwall (born Charles Cornewall; 1669 – 7 October 1718) was a Royal Navy officer and Whig politician who represented Bewdley and Weobley in the House of Commons of Great Britain between 1709 and 1718.

== Early life ==
Charles Cornewall was born in 1669, eldest of the eleven children of Robert Cornewall and Edith Cornwallis, and was baptised at Eye, Herefordshire, on 5 August 1669.

== Naval career ==
Cornewall joined the navy in 1683 and was given his first command, the Sloop HMS Portsmouth, on 19 September 1692. The following year he was given command of the 44-gun HMS Adventure and sailed under the command of Admiral Edward Russell to the Mediterranean, where he would remain until 1696.

On 27 January 1695, Adventure was one of a squadron of six frigates under the command of Commodore James Killegrew aboard HMS Plymouth. The flotilla was spotted by two French warships, the 60-gun Content and the 52-gun Trident, who closed on them believing them to be merchant ships. They retreated on discovering their mistake and were pursued by the British ships, the ensuing firefight lasting through the night and into the next morning before the French ships were compelled to surrender. Killigrew was killed in the action, and Cornewall was appointed to command the Plymouth in his place.

Cornewall was given command of HMS Kent in 1697, but left the navy after the Treaty of Ryswick. In 1701 he stood for parliament in Weobley against his cousin Henry Cornewall, but was defeated having gained just four votes. Returning to sea in March that year, he was given command of HMS Shrewsbury but had to resign a few months later due to the sudden death of his father whose concerns, he wrote on 25 September 1701, "are like to prove more troublesome and tedious than I expected, though when settled may prove of very considerable advantage to my children." These affairs having been settled, he was appointed to command HMS Exeter but rejected it when it became clear that he would effectively be a second captain under John Leake in Newfoundland, protesting that "their sending a private captain to command … me in my own ship [was] a modest way of terming me a blockhead."

This record of resigning from commands, combined with an uneasy political relationship with Robert Harley, made it difficult for him to gain a new command, and it was not until 1705 that he was appointed to HMS Orford. In that ship he returned to the Mediterranean where he served for the next two years, first under Clowdesley Shovell and then under Thomas Dilkes. In the autumn of 1707 he commanded a detached squadron operating off the coast of Naples, returning to England in March the following year.

In 1709 Cornewall changed his name to Cornwall, in an effort to distinguish between the different branches of his family, and stood once more for parliament. This time he was successful, being elected member for Bewdley on 2 March 1709. He did not spend much time in the house, being busy commanding squadrons in the Downs and off Dunkirk. In October 1710 he led a convoy to Smyrna aboard HMS Dreadnought, but his Whig politics made it impossible to gain a further command on his return, and he languished on half-pay for some years.

The accession of George I in 1714 brought about a dramatic improvement in Cornwall's prospects, with him being appointed Controller of Storekeepers Accounts at the Navy Board. In 1715 he returned to parliament as member for Weobley. He was promoted to the rank of Rear-Admiral of the Blue on 16 June 1716 and again to Rear-Admiral of the Red on 24 July. Cornwall was appointed Commander-in-Chief, Mediterranean Fleet in October.

Sailing with his flag aboard HMS Argyll, he took up his post in Gibraltar. His first task was to open negotiations with Ismail Ibn Sharif, emperor of Morocco to "demand satisfaction for the depredations of the Salé corsairs and procure the release of all His Majesty's subjects now captive in Barbary." When Ismail refused to release any slaves Cornwall established a blockade of his ports, but the measure had no effect on Ismail's policies despite the capture of several corsair vessels. During this time Cornwall engaged in a bitter dispute with the governor of Gibraltar Lord Portmore, who refused to admit the admiral's authority even in matters relating to the ships in the port. Cornwall eventually resolved to take the dispute the King or the speaker of the House of Commons but was prevented from doing so by being once more being called to active service.

Cornwall was promoted to Vice-Admiral of the Blue on 1 February 1717 and again to Vice-Admiral of the White in March. He became second-in-command to Admiral of the Fleet Sir George Byng on the latter's arrival in the Mediterranean in June of that year, hoisting his flag aboard HMS Shrewsbury. Cruising with a combined force of 21 ships of the line off Syracuse they attacked a Spanish fleet at the Battle of Cape Passaro on 31 July 1718. Cornwall led the vanguard of the British fleet, which comprised seven ships of the line. Attempting to avoid capture, the Spanish split into eight groups which the British chased down individually. Ultimately the battle resulted in a decisive British victory, with the Spanish losing eight ships of the line and seven frigates.

== Death and legacy ==
Following the Battle of Cape Passaro Cornwall transferred his flag back to HMS Argyll and convoyed the captured Spanish prizes to Port Mahon, from where he set sail for England. However, his health had been poor for some time, and on putting in at Lisbon on the homeward journey he died there on 7 October 1718. His body was conveyed home and buried in the south aisle of Westminster Abbey.

Cornwall's career had been illustrious without being spectacular, as John Charnock put it: "We have at least a very extraordinary, if not unequalled instance in this gentleman, of its being possible for an officer to serve, with the most irreproachable character, and to attain a very high rank in the service, without ever having it in his power to increase his reputation, by any of those brilliant exploits which fortune throws in the way of her greater favourites."

== Family ==
Cornwall married twice, but no details of his first marriage survives. His second wife was Dorothy Hanmer daughter of Thomas Hanmer, with whom he had fourteen children:

- Henry Cornewall (b. 1698)
- Thomas Cornewall (b. & d. 1699)
- Sir Robert de Cornwall (1700–56), MP for Leominster
- Henrietta Cornewall (1701–28)
- Cyriac Cornewall (1702–1703)
- Charles Cornewall (b. & d. 1704)
- Job Cornewall (1705–28)
- Theophila Cornewall (1706–21)
- Jane Cornewall (b. 1708)
- Jacobs Cornewall (1709–38), father of Charles Wolfran Cornwall
- Emma Cornwall (1712–77), married Thomas Vernon
- Edith Cornwall (b. & d. 1712)
- Annabella Cornwall (1713–82)
- Mary Cornwall (b. 1714)

His estate at Berrington was inherited on his death by Sir Robert.

Military offices
Preceded by John Baker	Commander-in-Chief, Mediterranean Fleet; 1716–1718	Succeeded by George Byng
Parliament of Great Britain
Preceded by Henry Herbert	Member of Parliament for Bewdley; 1709–1710	Succeeded by Anthony Lechmere
Preceded by John Birch; Uvedale Tomkins Price	Member of Parliament for Weobley; 1715–1718; With: Paul Foley 1715; John Birch 1715–18	Succeeded by John Birch; Nicholas Philpott
