= Henry Cornewall =

Henry Cornewall may refer to:

- Henry Cornewall (MP for Weobley) (c. 1654–1717), English soldier, courtier and member of parliament
- Henry Cornewall (British Army general) (1685–1756), his son, officer and member of parliament
