= John Birch (died 1735) =

English lawyer and Whig politician

John Birch (c. 1666–1735) of Garnstone manor, Herefordshire, was an English lawyer and Whig politician who sat in the English and British House of Commons between 1701 and 1735.

== Early life and family ==
Birch was the second son. of Rev. Thomas Birch, rector of Hampton Bishop, Herefordshire and his wife Mary. He was admitted at Gray's Inn in 1682, at Middle Temple in 1687 and called to the bar in 1687. His uncle Colonel John Birch, MP died in May 1691, leaving his property of Garnstone to his youngest daughter Sarah provided she married Birch, which she did a short time later. She died in 1702, leaving Birch in possession of the estate of Garnstone, which was a mile from Weobley. He married secondly Letitia Hampden, daughter of John Hampden, MP of Great Hampden, Buckinghamshire on 26 January 1704.

== Career ==
Birch first stood for Parliament at Weobley at the by-election in 1691 on the death of his uncle who was former MP, but lost out in a double return. He was appointed Attorney-general of Brecknock, Glamorgan and Radnor in 1695. He stood again at the 1698 general election, and again lost out in a double return. However at the first general election of 1701 he was returned successfully as Member of Parliament for Weobley. He was returned at the second general election of the year but was defeated at the 1702 general election. In 1705 he was appointed serjeant-at-law and at the 1705 general election was returned again as MP for Weobley. He was returned again in 1708 and 1710 as a Whig. In 1712 he was promoted to Queen's Serjeant. He was returned unopposed again at the 1713 general election.

At the 1715 general election Birch was defeated at Weobley, but was seated on petition on 18 June 1715. In January 1716 he was named as added to a secret committee appointed to prepare the impeachment of Jacobite rebel lords. In June 1716 was appointed Commissioner for forfeited estates, with a tax free salary of £1,000 per annum. He was re-elected as MP for Weobley in 1722 and 1727. In 1728, he was appointed cursitor baron of the Exchequer.

In 1731 Birch was exposed as being involved in a financial scandal. While on the Commission for forfeited lands, he had colluded with Denis Bond in the fraudulent sale of lands forfeited by the 3rd Earl of Derwentwater. They also acquired an annuity for the life of the real heir of the estate who was under age and expected to survive a full lifetime. When this heir died aged 18, the whole swindle came to light. A parliamentary inquiry was instituted by Lord Gage and as a result the sales were annulled. Bond and Birch were expelled from the House of Commons on 30 March 1732. At the ensuing by-election Birch stood but was defeated. He was elected at the 1734 general election, but the result was in dispute and this was not resolved until 1737, two years after his death.

== Death and legacy ==
Birch died without issue by either wife on 6 October 1735.

Parliament of England
Preceded by Thomas Foley; Robert Price	Member of Parliament for Weobley; British general election, 1701–1702 1702; With: Henry Cornewall 1701; Robert Price 1701-1702	Succeeded by Robert Price; Henry Cornewall
Preceded by Robert Price; Henry Cornewall	Member of Parliament for Weobley; 1705–1708; With: Henry Cornewall	Succeeded by Parliament of Great Britain
Parliament of Great Britain
Preceded by Parliament of England	Member of Parliament for Weobley; 1708– 1715; With: Henry Thynne 1708; Henry Gorges 1708-1710; Henry Cornewall 1710-1713; Uvedale Tomkins Price 1713-1715	Succeeded by Paul Foley; Vice-Admiral Charles Cornewall
Preceded by Paul Foley; Vice-Admiral Charles Cornewall	Member of Parliament for Weobley; 1715–1732; With: Vice-Admiral Charles Cornewall 1715-1718; Nicholas Philpott 1718-1727; Uvedale Tomkins Price 1727-1732	Succeeded by James Cornewall; Uvedale Tomkins Price
Preceded by James Cornewall; Uvedale Tomkins Price	Member of Parliament for Weobley; 1734–1735; With: Sir John Buckworth, Bt	Succeeded by James Cornewall; Sir John Buckworth, Bt
