= John Buckworth =

John Buckworth may refer to:

- Sir John Buckworth, 1st Baronet (1662–1709), English merchant
- Sir John Buckworth, 2nd Baronet (1704–1759), MP for Weobley
- Sir John Buckworth, 4th Baronet (1726–1801), of the Buckworth baronets
- Sir John Buckworth-Herne-Soame, 8th Baronet (1794–1888), of the Buckworth baronets

== See also ==
- Buckworth (surname)
