= Thomas Foley (auditor of the imprests) =

English politician (c. 1670 – 1737)

Thomas Foley (c. 1670 – 10 December 1737), of Stoke Edith Court, Herefordshire, was a British landowner and Tory politician who sat in the English and British House of Commons between 1691 and 1737. He held the sinecure office of auditor of the imprests.

Foley was the eldest son of Paul Foley, House of Commons of England and ironmaster, and succeeded to his estates around Stoke Edith, Herefordshire on his father's death in 1699.

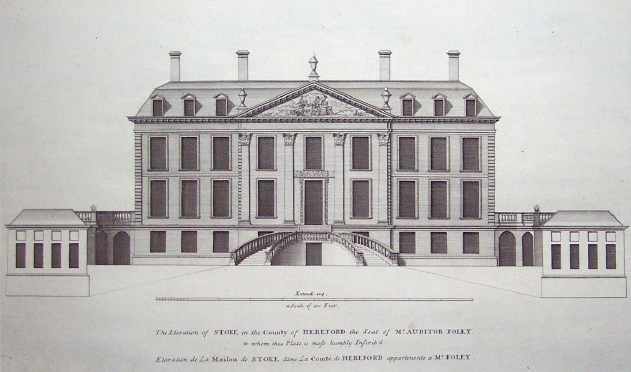
Stoke Edith

Foley was Member of parliament for Weobley from 1691 to 1698 and from 1699 to 1700. He was then MP for Hereford from 1701 to 1722. He was subsequently MP for Stafford from 1722 to 1727 and again from 1734 until his death. Throughout this period, he was the leading ironmaster in the Forest of Dean. Initially this business was managed by John Wheeler and then by William Rea, until Rea was sacked in 1725. From that time the number of ironworks operated by his business, latterly without outside partners gradually declined.

Foley and his wife Anne, daughter and heir of Essex Knightley of Fawsley, Northamptonshire had one son Thomas Foley, and two daughters, Anne and Mary.

Political offices
Preceded by Edward Harley; Arthur Mainwaring	Auditor of the imprests 1713–1737; With: Edward Harley; William Benson	Succeeded by William Benson; William Aislabie
Parliament of England
Preceded by Robert Price; Colonel John Birch	Member of parliament for Weobley; 1691–1701; With: Robert Price	Succeeded by Henry Cornewall; John Birch
Preceded by James Brydges; Samuel Pytts	Member of parliament for Hereford; 1701–1707; With: James Brydges	Succeeded by Parliament of Great Britain
Parliament of Great Britain
Preceded by Parliament of England	Member of parliament for Hereford; 1707–1722; With: James Brydges 1707–1714; The Viscount Scudamore 1715–1716; Herbert Rudhale Westfaling 1717–1722	Succeeded by Herbert Rudhale Westfaling; William Mayo
Preceded by The 1st Viscount Chetwynd; William Chetwynd	Member of parliament for Stafford; 1722–1727; With: John Dolphin 1722–1724; Francis Elde 1724–1725; The 1st Viscount Chetwynd 1725–1727	Succeeded by The 1st Viscount Chetwynd; Joseph Gascoigne Nightingale
Preceded by The 1st Viscount Chetwynd; Joseph Gascoigne Nightingale	Member of parliament for Stafford; 1734–1737; With: William Chetwynd	Succeeded by William Chetwynd; The 2nd Viscount Chetwynd
