= Sir Herbert Croft, 1st Baronet =

British politician (c.1651–1720)

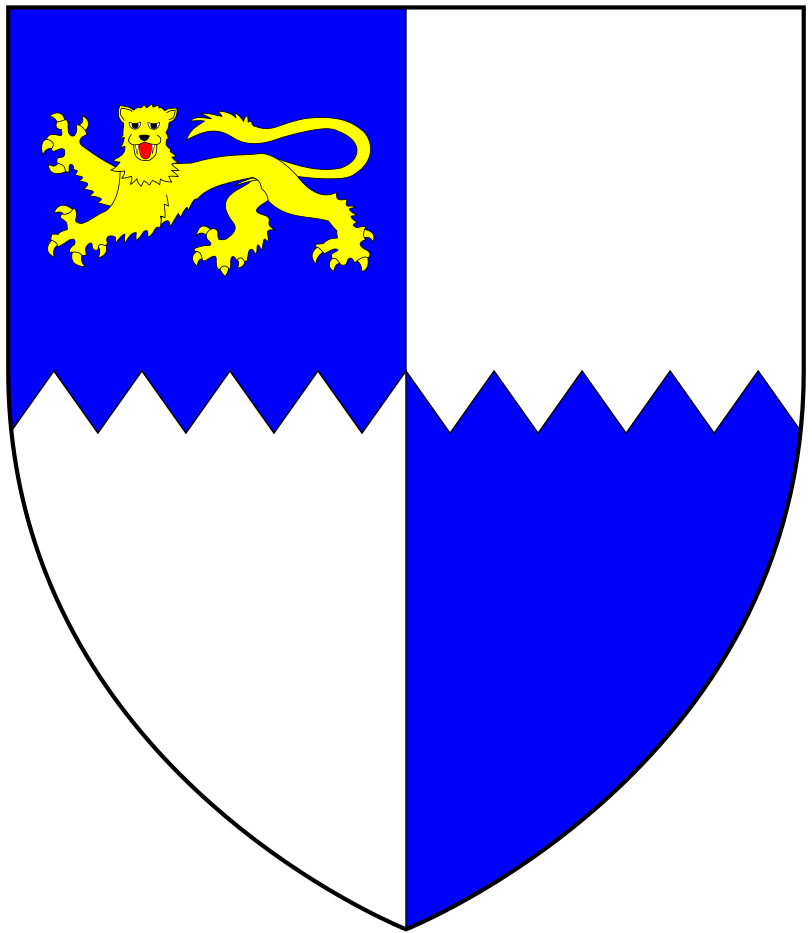
Arms of Croft, of Croft Castle, Herefordshire: Quarterly per fess indented azure and argent, in the 1st quarter a lion passant guardant or

Sir Herbert Croft, 1st Baronet (c. 1651 – 3 November 1720) was an English politician.

== Family ==
Croft was the only son of the Right Reverend Herbert Croft, Bishop of Hereford and Anne Browne, the only daughter of the Very Rev. Dr. Jonathan Browne and Anne Barne Lovelace. Her half-brothers were Richard Lovelace (1618–1657) an English poet in the seventeenth century and Francis Lovelace (1621–1675), who was the second governor of the New York Colony appointed by James, Duke of York (later King James II).

The great nephew of both George Sandys (2 March 1577 – March 1644), the traveller, colonist and poet, and of Sir Edwin Sandys (9 December 1561 – October 1629), an English statesman and one of the founders of the London Company, he was also the great great grandson of Cicely Wilford and the Most Reverend Dr. Edwin Sandys, an Anglican church leader who successively held the posts of the Bishop of Worcester (1559–1570), Bishop of London (1570–1576), and the Archbishop of York (1576–1588), one of the translators of the Bishops' Bible.

== Life ==
Croft matriculated at Magdalen College, Oxford in April 1668, and entered the Middle Temple in the same year.

Sir Herbert was created a baronet in 1671, and served as member of Parliament for Herefordshire in 1679 and 1690 to 1698. He was appointed High Sheriff of Herefordshire in 1682.

He inherited Croft Castle from his father in 1691.

He married Elizabeth, daughter of Thomas Archer of Umberslade, Warwickshire, by whom he had two sons: Archer, his successor and Francis, the grandfather of the 5th and 6th baronets.

He is buried at the Parish Church of St. Michael, Croft.

Parliament of England
Preceded by Thomas Prise; Sir John Kyrle	Member of Parliament for Herefordshire; 1679; With: The Viscount Scudamore	Succeeded by The Viscount Scudamore; Sir Edward Harley
Preceded by Sir John Morgan; Sir Edward Harley	Member of Parliament for Herefordshire; 1690–1698; With: Sir John Morgan 1690–1693; Sir Edward Harley 1693–1698	Succeeded by Henry Gorges; Henry Cornewall
Baronetage of England
New creation	Baronet (of Croft Castle); 1671–1720	Succeeded by Archer Croft
