= Uvedale Tomkins Price =

British politician

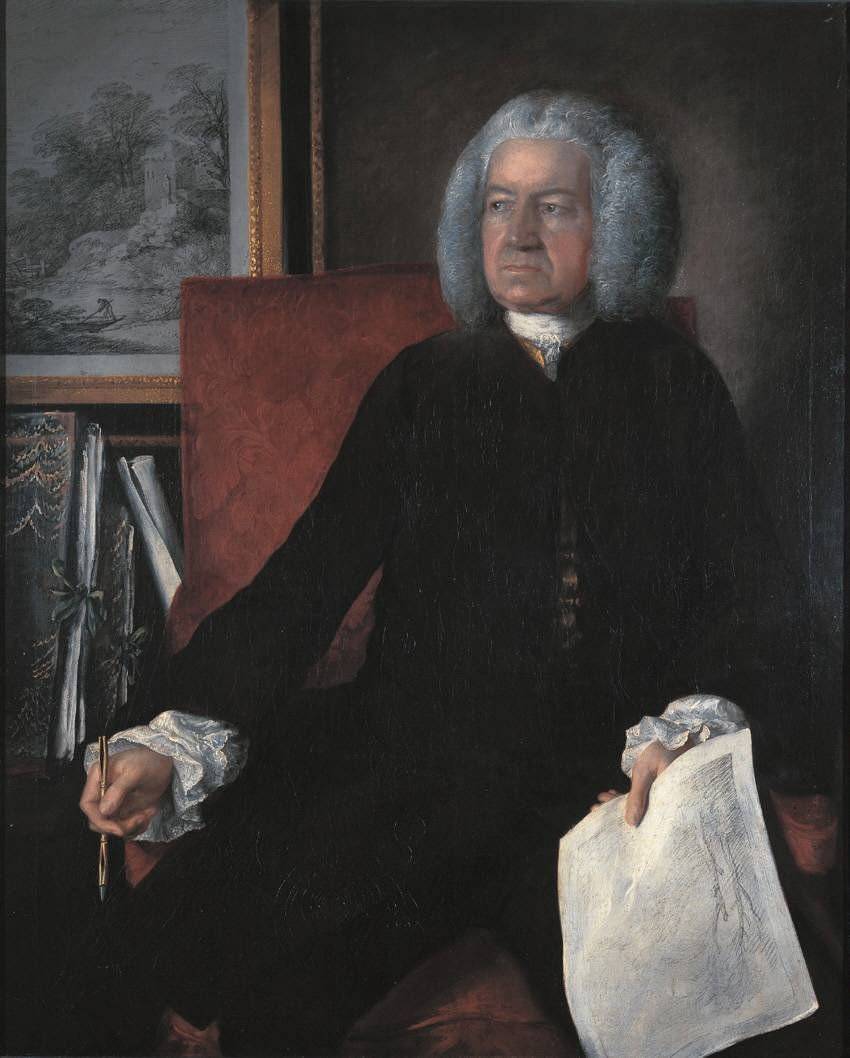
Uvedale Tomkins Price (c. 1760) by Thomas Gainsborough.

Uvedale Tomkins Price (17 September 1685 – 17 March 1764), of Poston Lodge and Foxley, Yazor, Herefordshire, was a British Tory and later Whig politician who sat in the House of Commons between 1713 and 1734.

== Early life ==
Price was the younger son of Robert Price, Baron of the Exchequer, and his wife Lucy Rodd, daughter and heiress of Robert Rodd of Foxley at Yazor, Herefordshire. He was named after Lucy's uncle Uvedale Tomkins, the son of her grandmother Lucy Uvedale by the latter's second husband Sir Thomas Tomkins, MP. He was educated at Charterhouse School and St Paul's by 1703 and was admitted at St John's College, Cambridge on 12 January 1704 and Lincoln's Inn on 22 October 1706. Between 1709 and 1712 he travelled abroad in France and Italy. He was married in 1714 to Anne Somerset, daughter and coheiress of Lord Arthur Somerset of Poston Court in Vowchurch, Herefordshire (younger son of Henry Somerset, 1st Duke of Beaufort), by his wife Mary, daughter and heiress of Sir William Russell, 1st baronet of Laugharne, Carmarthenshire. He was Steward of the courts, for Denbigh until 1740.

== Career ==
Price's father had been Member of Parliament for Weobley until he became Baron of the Exchequer in 1702 when he was succeeded in the seat by his elder son Thomas, who was then only 21 or 22. Thomas's career ended prematurely, as he died unmarried at Genoa in September 1706.

Uvedale Price was returned as Tory MP for Weobley at the 1713 British general election, and, in Parliament, he probably acted in support of Oxford's administration. He did not stand at the 1715 British general election. After a break, he was returned unopposed as MP for Weobley, as a Whig, at the 1727 British general election. He voted with the Government at every recorded division, except when he voted with the Opposition on the Hessian troops in 1730. He was unenthusiastic about his career in Parliament and did not stand at the 1734 British general election. He succeeded his father in 1733 and his wife Anne died in 1741.

== Death and legacy ==
Price died on 17 March 1764 and was buried in Bath Abbey. With his wife he had three daughters, who died early; and an only son, Robert Price (1717–1761), who, by a daughter of John Shute Barrington, 1st Viscount Barrington, had seven surviving sons. He was succeeded at Foxley by his grandson Uvedale Price, writer on the Picturesque.

Parliament of Great Britain
Preceded by John Birch; Henry Cornewall	Member of Parliament for Weobley; 1713–1715; With: John Birch	Succeeded by Paul Foley; Vice-Admiral Charles Cornewall 1
Preceded by John Birch; Nicholas Philpott	Member of Parliament for Weobley; 1727–1734; With: John Birch 1727-1732; James Cornewall 1732-1734	Succeeded by John Birch; Sir John Buckworth, Bt
