= Speaker Foley =

Speaker Foley is the name of:

- Tom Foley (1929–2013), Speaker of the U.S. House of Representatives 1989–1995
- Paul Foley (ironmaster) (1644/5–1699), Speaker of the British House of Commons 1695–1698
