= Paul Foley (ironmaster) =

English politician (1644/45–1699)

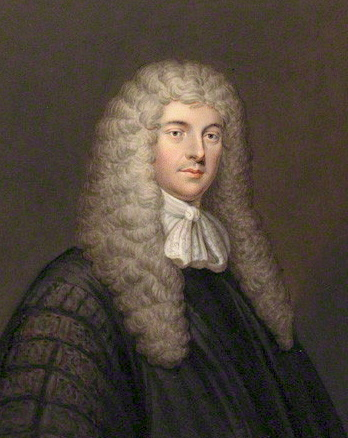
Speaker Foley

Paul Foley (1644/5 – 13 November 1699), also known as Speaker Foley, was the second son of Thomas Foley of Witley Court, the prominent Midlands ironmaster.

== Ironmaster ==
He took over his father's ironworks in and around the Forest of Dean in the early 1670s and continued them until 1685 when he let them to John Wheeler and Richard Avenant, who had managed ironworks for his brother Philip Foley. In 1692, the two brothers entered into a partnership with these managers and John Wheeler's brother, Richard. This lasted until after Paul's death.

== Gentleman ==
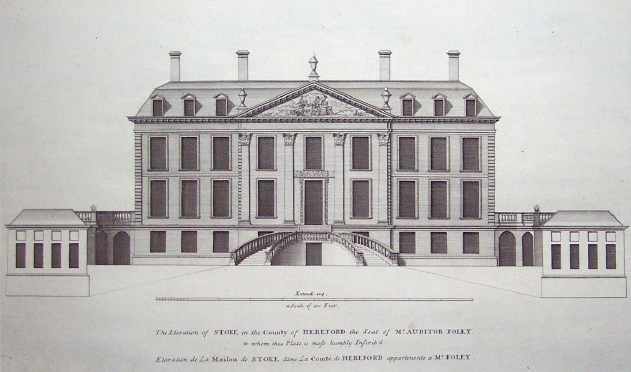
Stoke Edith House – built by Paul Foley.

Paul Foley had the resources from his father and the profits of his ironworks to buy himself a substantial estate around Stoke Edith in Herefordshire, part of which still belongs to a descendant. Important purchases included Stoke Edith from the trustees of Sir Henry Lingen in 1670 (made by his father), and other property from Sir Thomas Cooke in 1683. He rebuilt the house at Stoke Edith and laid out formal gardens and a park (which he had a royal licence to empark.

== Politician ==
Paul Foley was elected MP for Hereford in 1679. He was elected again for the same seat in 1689. He actively campaigned for the exclusion of the Duke of York from the throne. He was imprisoned at the time of the Rye House Plot and again during the Monmouth Rebellion. However, James II later favoured him during his own later difficulties. During the reign of William III, he took an anti-court position, leading the "Country Whigs" faction with his nephew Robert Harley. During the early 1690s, he sat on several important Parliamentary committees, including being a commissioner of accounts. He was elected Speaker of the House of Commons on 14 March 1695, a post he held until his death. He was (like the Harleys and his elder brother Thomas) a Presbyterian and used his patronage rights in the Church of England to appoint clergy of that persuasion to churches.

== Family ==
He married Mary daughter of Alderman John Lane of London. Their eldest son was Thomas Foley. His younger son Paul, was also briefly an MP.

== Arms ==
Coat of arms of Paul Foley
Crest A lion rampant Argent holding between the fore-paws an escutcheon charged with the arms. Escutcheon Argent a fess engrailed between three cinquefoils Sable within a bordure of the last. Motto Ut Prosim

Political offices
Preceded by Sir John Trevor	Speaker of the House of Commons; 1695–1698	Succeeded by Sir Thomas Littleton
Parliament of England
Preceded by Herbert Westfaling; The Viscount Scudamore	Member of Parliament for Hereford; 1679–1685; With: Bridstock Harford 1679–1681; Herbert Aubrey 1681–1685	Succeeded by Herbert Aubrey; Thomas Geers
Preceded by Herbert Aubrey; Thomas Geers	Member of Parliament for Hereford; 1689–1699; With: Sir William Gregory 1689; Henry Cornewall 1689–1695; James Morgan 1695–1698; James Brydges 1698–1699	Succeeded by James Brydges; Samuel Pytts
