= Robert Price (1717–1761) =

English gentleman artist

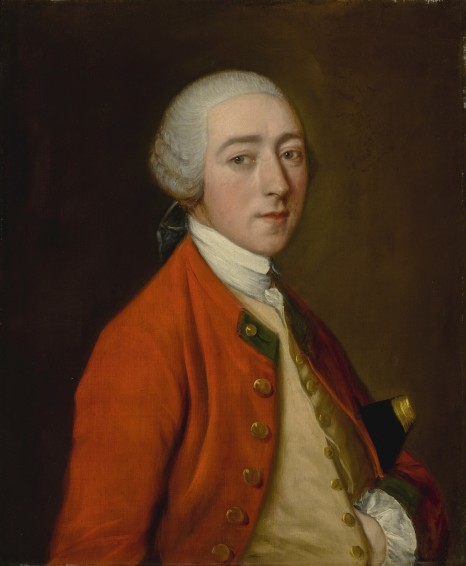
Robert Price, portrait by Thomas Gainsborough

Robert Price (1717–1761) was an English gentleman, known as an artist for his drawings, and as a musical amateur. He contributed to the garden design at the family property of Foxley, Herefordshire, was an art patron, and was the father of Uvedale Price, theorist of the picturesque.

== Early life ==
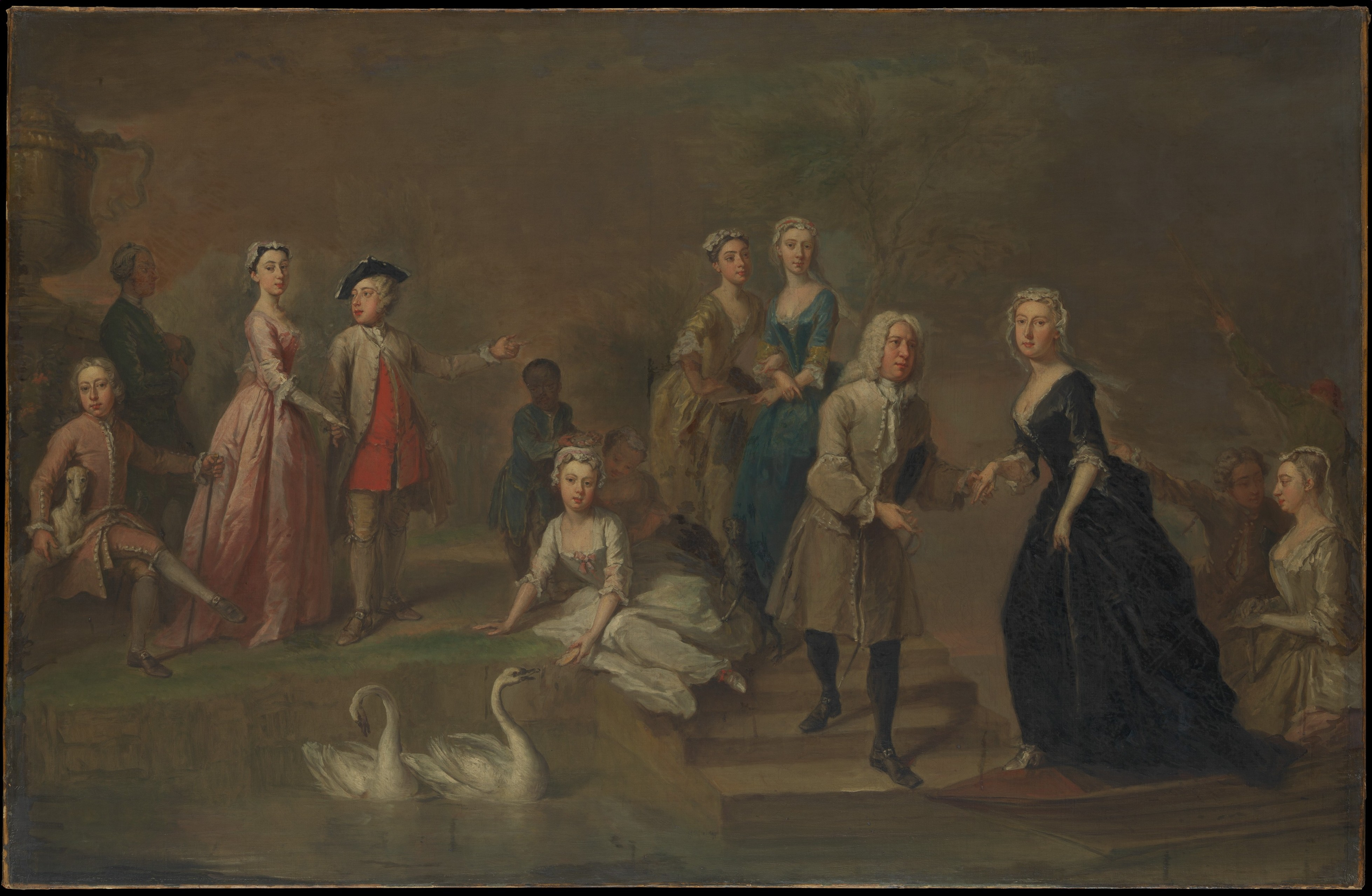
In this family group by Bartholomew Dandridge, Robert Price wears a hat, fourth from the left

He was the son of Uvedale Tomkyns Price and his wife Anne Somerset, daughter of Lord Arthur Somerset who was the second son of Henry Somerset, 1st Duke of Beaufort. He was educated at Winchester College.

== Grand Tour ==
Price undertook an extended Grand Tour in Italy and Geneva, from 1738 to 1741. Much of it was in the company of William Windham and his tutor Benjamin Stillingfleet. They were joined also by Richard Pococke. In Rome they took art lessons from Giovanni Battista Busiri, and Price studied music under Andrea Basili.

In Geneva, Price took part in the "Common Room" group of expatriate Britons running amateur dramatics in 1740–1, supplying incidental music and painting scenery. Besides Windham and Stillingfleet, Richard Aldworth was a major contributor to the plays and pantomimes, with George Hervey playing female parts en travesti. Others involved were Thomas Dampier and his pupil Benjamin Tate, and Thomas Hamilton, 7th Earl of Haddington with his brother and tutor. There was an orchestra led by Gaspard Fritz.

Some of the group, including Price, with Pococke and Walter Chetwynd (died 1786, the Fellow of King's College, Cambridge), made a six-day journey in June 1741 to visit Chamonix, the Mer de Glace and other alpine sights.

At the end of that period Price met in Paris Jacques-Philippe Le Bas, and adopted his habit of carrying a sketchbook around with him. At the time he met also the engraver Andrew Lawrence.

== Associations ==
In London, Price knew both William Hogarth and the young Thomas Gainsborough. Gainsborough married in 1746 Margaret Burr, illegitimate daughter of Henry Somerset, 3rd Duke of Beaufort who was Price's second cousin on his mother's side. Hamilton suggests that the friendship with Price was significant for Gainsborough, while the Beaufort family connection could be "serendipitous", but again Price may have brought the couple together.

In 1743 the engraver Joseph Wood published an etching from a Gaspard Dughet painting in Price's collection. A broader use of the "Common Room" term is for a classical culture study group that included Arthur Pond, a Grand Tourist of the 1720s. He published Italian Landscapes from 1741, a series of engravings after Claude Lorrain and Dughet. The Price family were good customers of his, and lent paintings for him to engrave.

At Lewes Price encountered the artist and musician John Malchair who was there to teach music to army officers. Price belonged to the musical circle around John Christopher Smith, which included also Stillingfleet and John Stanley, and wrote the libretto for Smith's oratorio Judith.

== At Foxley ==
Foxley House, demolished in 1948, lay between Yazor and Mansell Lacy. The house was built by Francis Smith of Warwick and his brother William, over the period 1719 to 1730.

Robert Price (1653–1733), Price's grandfather, had acquired the Foxley estate in 1681, through marriage to a daughter of Robert Rodd. The setting has been described as a "secluded, wooded, horseshoe-shaped valley", and a "wild demesne".

Price resided at Foxley, after his marriage in 1746. Benjamin Stillingfleet was a frequent visitor to a cottage near the house, and took up botany there. Price and Stillingfleet together sought out picturesque landscape, and from 1757 a plan to develop the estate proceeded. The fashioning of the Foxley estate is largely attributed to Robert Price, and secondarily to his son Uvedale. The "irregular but easy paths leading up to viewpoints" mentioned in the Oxford Companion to Gardens are now attributed to Richard, who used a "triangle and plummet" to equalise gradients.

Sold by the Price family in 1855, the iconic "picturesque" landscaped estate at Foxley has returned to the normal mixed farming look of the county.

== Works ==
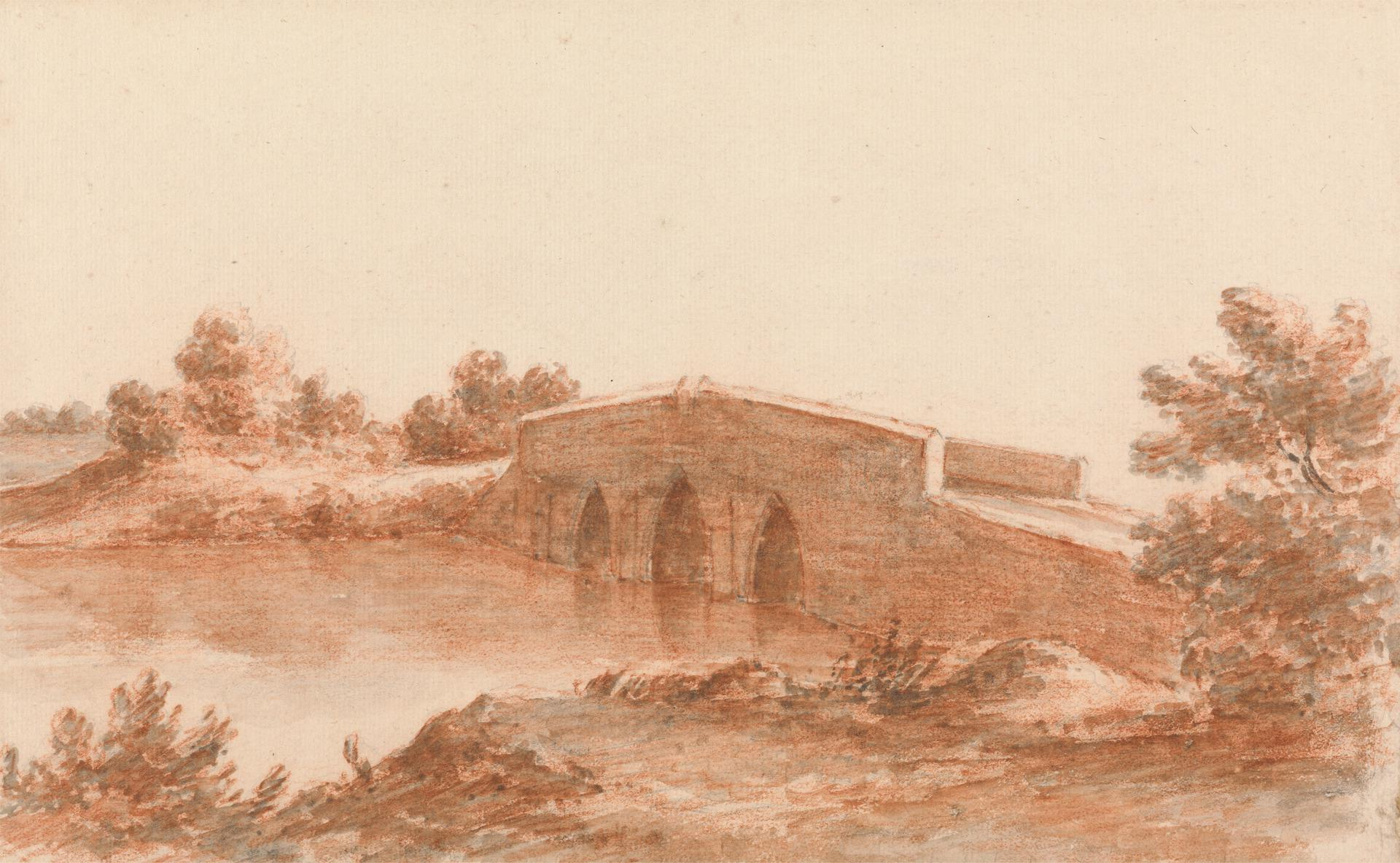
Robert Price, red chalk drawing A Bridge in a Landscape

- Illustrations in a pamphlet recording the 1741 alpine expedition and a sequel. It was published as An Account of the Glaciers or Ice Alps in Savoy in two letters (1744), and included a fold-out engraving by François Vivares from a drawing made on the way by Price. The expedition is now considered innovative, an early example of the "picturesque tour". A tradition of British visits to Chamonix was established, for example documented in the 1767 visit of William Benson Earle, and that of John Moore in 1773.
- Illustrations in Stillingfleet's Observations on Grasses (1762). Seven out of 11 are attributed to Price.
- An essay comparing German and Italian music, published in John Mainwaring's life of Handel.
- An almost complete musical setting of the libretto Giuseppe riconosciuto by Pietro Metastasio, and some settings of operatic fragment.

The 1964 paper Some newly discovered drawings by Robert Price of Foxley by F. I. McCarthy announced the attribution to Price of 18 drawings in the collection of the National Library of Wales to Price. They were from a tour of North Wales in 1759, which Price took with Stillingfleet, following their respective interests in landscape and botany. Price paid particular attention to waterfalls. Some of these drawings were later engraved by Isaac Basire.

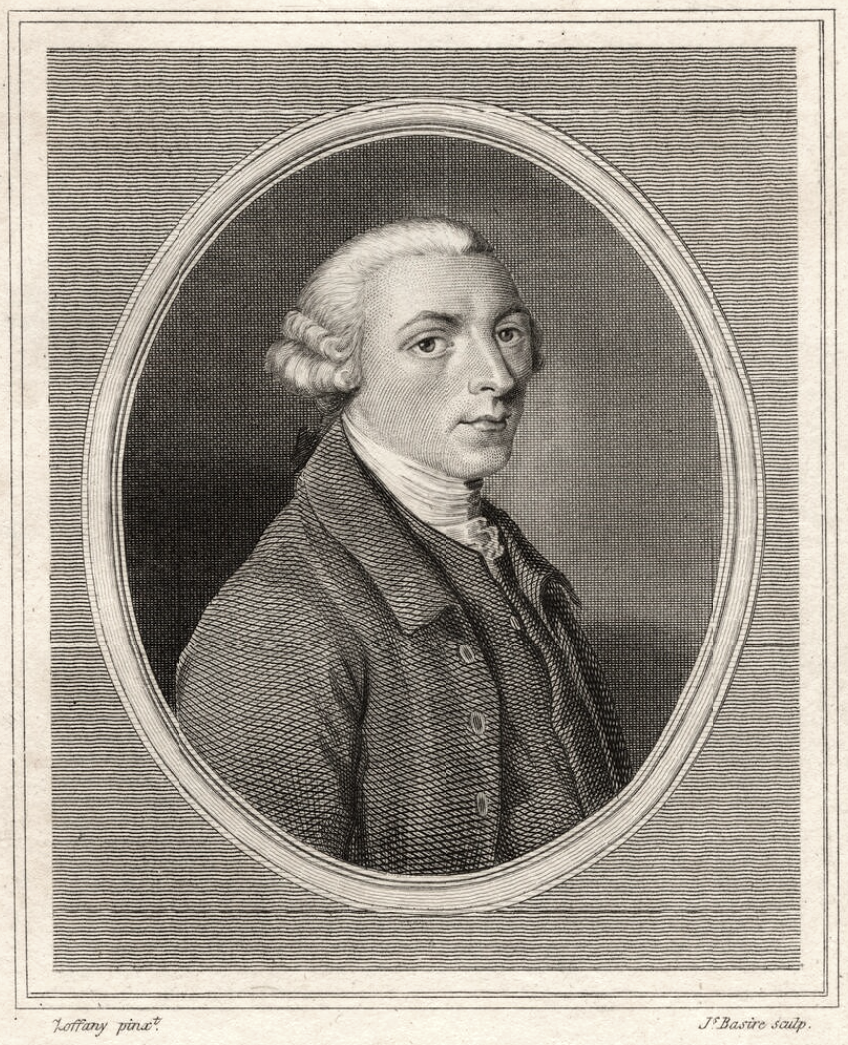
Robert Price, engraving after a portrait of 1761 by Thomas Gainsborough

== Family ==
Price married in 1746 Sarah Barrington, daughter of John Barrington, 1st Viscount Barrington. They had seven sons and three daughters.
