= Henry Cornewall (MP for Weobley) =

English soldier, courtier and Member of Parliament

Colonel Henry Cornewall (c. 1654 – 22 February 1717) was an English soldier, courtier and Member of Parliament.

== Early life ==
He was born the eldest son of Edward Cornewall of Moccas Court and Frances (née Pye) Vaughan, daughter of Sir Walter Pye and the widow of Henry Vaughan of Moccas Court and Bredwardine. From his mother's first marriage, he had an elder half-brother, Roger Vaughan, a courtier and MP for Hereford. He succeeded his father in 1709.

== Career ==
In 1685 he raised a regiment of foot, which later became the 9th (East Norfolk) Regiment of Foot. He resigned this command following the Glorious Revolution, as he personally opposed William III of England taking the throne. He was replaced by Colonel John Cunningham who led the regiment to Ireland to try and relieve the Siege of Derry. In the House of Commons, he represented Weobley from 1685 to 1689, Hereford from 1689 to 1695, Herefordshire from 1698 to 1701 and Weobley again in 1701, from 1702 to 1708, and from 1710 to 1713.

== Personal life ==
He married twice. Firstly to Margarita Laurentia Huyssen of Middelburg in Zeeland, the wealthy heiress of Laurentius Huyssen Lord of Welden, whom he married on 11 October 1683. The couple had two children.

- Henry Cornewall (1685–1756), General
- William Henry Cornewall (died 1688, aged four months)

Margarita died on 26 April 1692 and was buried at the Dutch Church, Austin Friars. Henry's second wife was Susanna, the daughter and coheir of Sir John Williams, whom he married on 27 April 1695. The couple had three children:

- Velters Cornewall (1697–1768), MP for Herefordshire
- James Cornewall (1698–1744), Captain in the Royal Navy, killed at the Battle of Toulon
- Mary Cornewall (d. 1741), married to Hon. Henry Berkeley

Cornewall died on 22 February 1717, and was buried six days later in the South aisle of Westminster Abbey. He left his Radnor estates to his eldest son and property in Herefordshire (Moccas Hall and Bredwardine) to Velters.

Parliament of England
Preceded by John Booth; Colonel John Birch	Member of Parliament for Weobley; 1685–1689; With: Robert Price	Succeeded by Colonel John Birch; James Morgan
Preceded by Sir William Gregory; Paul Foley	Member of Parliament for Hereford; 1689–1695; With: Paul Foley	Succeeded by James Morgan; Paul Foley
Preceded by Edward Harley; Sir Herbert Croft	Member of Parliament for Herefordshire; 1698–1701; With: Henry Gorges	Succeeded by Sir John Williams; Henry Gorges
Preceded by Thomas Foley; Robert Price	Member of Parliament for Weobley; 1701; With: John Birch	Succeeded by Robert Price; John Birch
Preceded by Robert Price; John Birch	Member of Parliament for Weobley; 1702–1707; With: Robert Price 1702–1705; John Birch 1705–1707	Succeeded by Parliament of Great Britain
Parliament of Great Britain
Preceded by Parliament of England	Member of Parliament for Weobley; 1707–1708; With: John Birch	Succeeded by John Birch; Henry Thynne
Preceded by John Birch; Henry Gorges	Member of Parliament for Weobley; 1710–1713; With: John Birch	Succeeded by John Birch; Uvedale Tomkins Price
