= John Scudamore, 2nd Viscount Scudamore =

English landowner and politician

John Scudamore, 2nd Viscount Scudamore DL (c. 1650 – July 1697), was an English landowner and politician.

John was the son of James Scudamore (died 1668) by Jane Bennet, daughter of Richard Bennet. He was the grandson of John Scudamore, 1st Viscount Scudamore, He succeeded his grandfather in the viscountcy in 1671. This was an Irish peerage and did not entitle him to a seat in the English House of Lords. He was instead returned to Parliament for Hereford in 1673, a seat he held until 1679, and then represented Herefordshire until 1681. He was also a Deputy Lieutenant of Gloucestershire and High Steward of Hereford.

Lord Scudamore married Lady Frances Cecil, only daughter of John Cecil, 4th Earl of Exeter, in 1672. They had three sons, of whom the eldest died young. Lady Scudamore died in 1694. Lord Scudamore survived her by three years and died on 24 June 1697 at Llanthony Secunda Priory and was buried in Holme Lacy on 10 July 1697. He was succeeded in the viscountcy by his second but eldest surviving son, James.

Parliament of England
| Preceded by Herbert Westfaling; Roger Vaughan | Member of Parliament for Hereford; 1673–1679; With: Herbert Westfaling | Succeeded by Bridstock Harford; Paul Foley |
| Preceded by Thomas Prise; Sir John Kyrle | Member of Parliament for Herefordshire; 1679–1681; With: Sir Herbert Croft, Bt February–September 1679; Sir Edward Harley September 1679–1681 | Succeeded by Sir John Morgan, Bt; Sir John Hoskyns, Bt |
Peerage of Ireland
| Preceded by John Scudamore | Viscount Scudamore; 1671–1697 | Succeeded by James Scudamore |
