= Paul Foley (politician) =

British politician (1688–1739)

Paul Foley (c.1688 – 28 November 1739), Newport, Herefordshire, was an English barrister and politician who sat in the House of Commons from 1713 to 1715.

Foley was the second son of Paul Foley, who was Speaker of the House of Commons from 1695 to 1698. He was admitted at Inner Temple at the age of five in 1693 but eventually was admitted to Lincoln's Inn in 1706 and called to the bar in 1708. He married Susannah Massingberd, daughter of Sir William Massingberd, 2nd Baronet, of Bratoft Hall, Gunby, Lincolnshire.

Foley's father had died in 1699 and his parliamentary colleague Robert Harley took an interest in the Foley family, as he'd married his cousin Elizabeth Foley in 1685. He was instrumental in arranging with the Duchess of Newcastle for Foley to stand at Aldborough at the 1713 general election. Foley was returned as Member of Parliament in an expensive contest. His only identified contribution in Parliament was a speech regarding the expulsion of Richard Steele. Circumstances changed at Aldborough, and at the general election in 1715, he found another seat at Weobley. He was elected MP in the poll, but his election was overturned on petition on 18 June 1715. He contested a by-election at Weobley in 1732, but without success.

Foley married as his second wife by licence dated 13 December 1722, Susannah Hoare, daughter of Henry Hoare, banker, of Fleet Street, London and Stourton Castle, Wiltshire. The marriage into a prosperous banking family combined with a successful legal practice made him rich. He died on 28 November 1739 without issue by either wife. Administration of the estate was granted to his great-nephew Thomas Foley.

Parliament of Great Britain
Preceded by Robert Monckton; William Jessop	Member of Parliament for Aldborough; 1713–1715; With: John Dawnay	Succeeded by James Stanhope; William Jessop
Preceded by John Birch; Uvedale Tomkins Price	Member of Parliament for Weobley; 1715; With: Charles Cornewall	Succeeded by Charles Cornewall; John Birch
