= Richard Weston (died 1681) =

Member of the Parliament of England

Richard Weston (1620 – 23 March 1681) was an English judge and politician who sat in the House of Commons in 1660.

Weston was the son of Edward Weston of Hackney. He matriculated at Corpus Christi College, Cambridge in 1639, and migrated to Jesus College, Cambridge on 6 September 1641, but left without taking a degree. He was admitted to Gray's Inn on 10 August 1642, and was called to the bar in 1649.

In April 1660, Weston was elected Member of Parliament for Weobley in the Convention Parliament. However the election declared void on 16 July 1660 on the grounds that the Sheriff had failed to send a precept and had not given due notice of the time. By 1662, Weston's arguments in court had attracted attention and were noticed by Thomas Raymond in his Reports of Cases.

Weston was made Lent reader at Gray's Inn in 1676, Serjeant-at-law on 23 Oct. 1677, and became King's Serjeant on 5 February 1678. He was knighted at the same time. He was judge in several important trials between 1678 and 1680. On 7 February 1680 he was made Puisne Baron of the Exchequer.

In the midsummer assizes at Kingston in 1680 he checked George Jeffreys for browbeating the other side in their examination of witnesses, and so made an implacable enemy for himself. Also in 1680, he granted a habeas corpus to Sheridan, whom the House of Commons had committed, when some of the judges held back from so doing. In December 1680 the commons voted an impeachment against him based on some expressions he used in his charge to the jury at Kingston. In speaking of the theologians Calvin and Zwinglius he said ‘Now they were amusing us with fears, and nothing would serve them but a parliament .... for my part I know no representative of the nation but the king.’ The crime with which he was charged was that his words were ‘scandalous to the reformation, and tending to raise discord.’ Parliament was dissolved before the impeachment was brought in and he died before the next parliament proceeded to the business.

Weston died in Chancery Lane and was buried at Hackney on 26 March 1681.

Weston married Frances Manwood, daughter of Sir George Marwood of Little Buskby.
