= James Cornewall =

British Royal Navy officer and politician

Captain James Cornewall
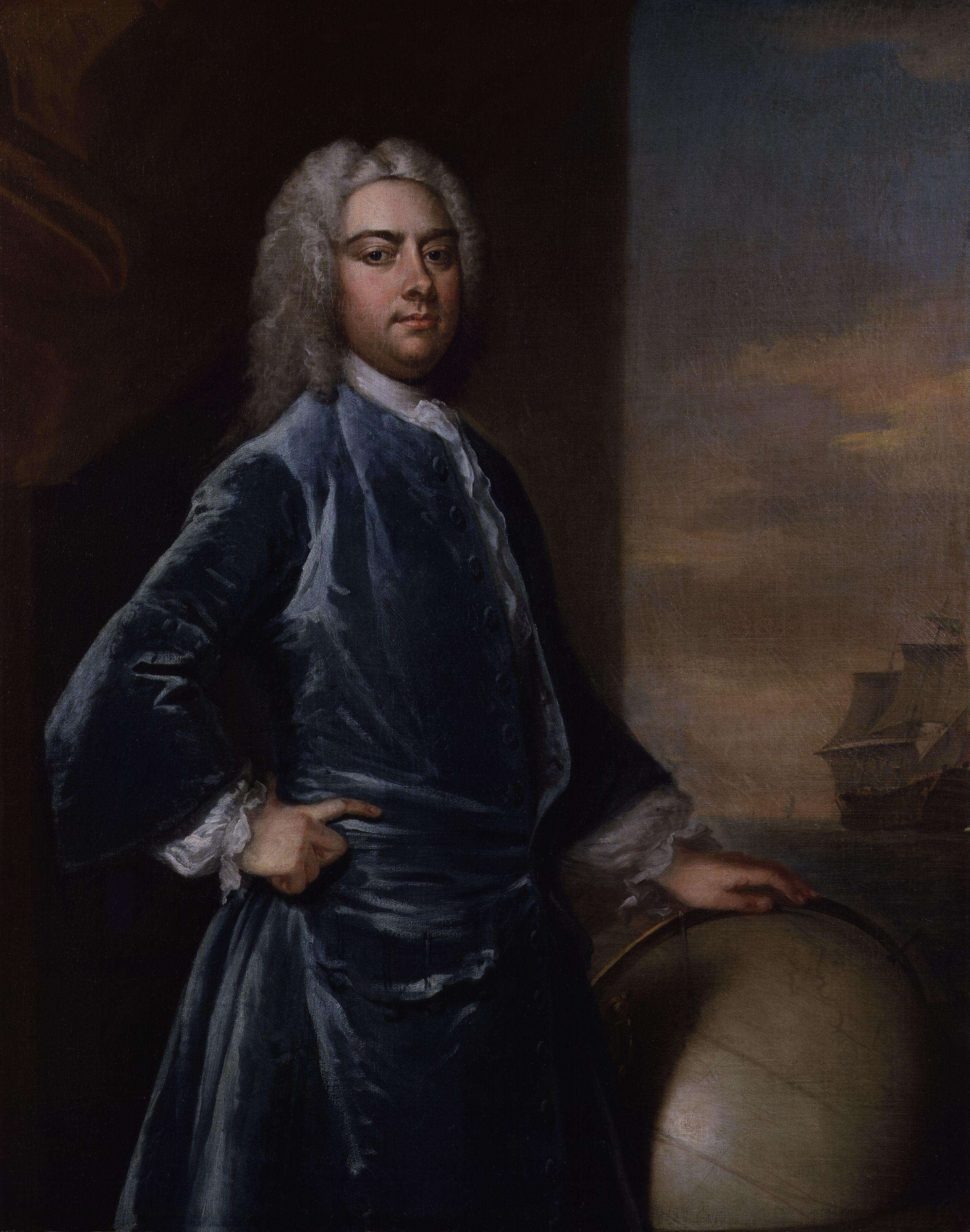
- Born: 1698; Moccas, Herefordshire
- Died: 11 February 1744 (aged 45) off Toulon, Mediterranean Sea
- Spouse: Hannah Southwark
- Children: Thomas Cornewall
- Military career
- Allegiance: Great Britain
- Branch: Royal Navy
- Service years: 1691–1744
- Rank: Captain
- Commands: HMS Sheerness; HMS Greyhound; HMS Deptford; HMS Greenwich; HMS St Albans; HMS Bedford; HMS Marlborough
- Conflicts: War of the Austrian Succession; Battle of Toulon

Captain James Cornewall (c. 1698 – 11 February 1744) was a British Royal Navy officer and politician who became a national hero following his death in action at the Battle of Toulon in 1744. Cornewall's monument in Westminster Abbey was the first ever to be erected by the Parliament of Great Britain at public expense.

== Early life and career ==
Cornewall was born in 1698, the youngest son of Henry Cornewall and his second wife Susanna, and was baptised at Moccas on 17 November 1698.

His naval career began as a Volunteer-per-order, serving first upon HMS Chatham from March 1721 before transferring to HMS Torbay in December of the same year. Three years later, he was given his first independent command, he was promoted to captain of the Fifth-rate HMS Sheerness on 3 April 1724. He spent four years aboard this ship, principally in the waters off Boston, protecting trade and suppressing piracy. John Knox Laughton compares this phase of his life to "the opening chapters of Fenimore Cooper's Water Witch and Red Rover."

While in Boston, Cornwall drew the ire of provincial authorities for heavy-handedness. When local authorities raised a crew and provincial naval vessel to hunt pirates in the summer of 1726, Cornwall stopped them and fired on the vessel when the provincial sailors refused to stop for him.

He returned to England in August 1728, and made an unsuccessful attempt to represent the seat of Weobley on 30 January 1730, losing to John Birch. When Birch was expelled from Parliament due to his involvement in the fraudulent sale of the Derwentwater estates, Cornewall stood again and defeated him on 14 April 1732. In December of that year he was back at sea, this time commanding HMS Greyhound, which he sailed to the coast of Morocco establishing friendly relations with the Barbary pirates of Salé and the bashaw of Tétouan.

In March 1734 he was back in England, where he unsuccessfully attempted to retain his seat in the General Election of that year, losing once again to John Birch. In June he took command of HMS Deptford and served in the English Channel and was part of a fleet commanded by Sir John Norris sent to the Iberian Peninsula to protect Portugal from Spanish attack. Cornewall had sought to overturn the result of the 1734 election on the basis that "the right of election [at Weobley] was in the occupiers or owners of certain 'ancient vote-houses' and not in the householders at large." By the time the House came to consider this petition, Birch was no longer alive to defend his side of the argument, resulting in Cornewall once more being appointed to the seat on 3 March 1737.

He was not able to spend much time in the House, only recorded as voting twice and speaking once. In early 1737 he was commander of HMS Greenwich and served off the West African coast, regulating British trade in the region. He was once rumoured to have personally transported a cargo of African slaves to Barbados, but the British Admiralty was unable to find any evidence to support the allegation.

In 1739 he was given command of HMS St Albans and sent to cruise the waters off the Azores with HMS Weymouth and prey upon Spanish ships. A plan that would have seen him lead a small flotilla to the China Seas fell through, and instead he was given command of HMS Bedford in 1741 and sent to the Mediterranean the following year with Admiral Thomas Mathews.

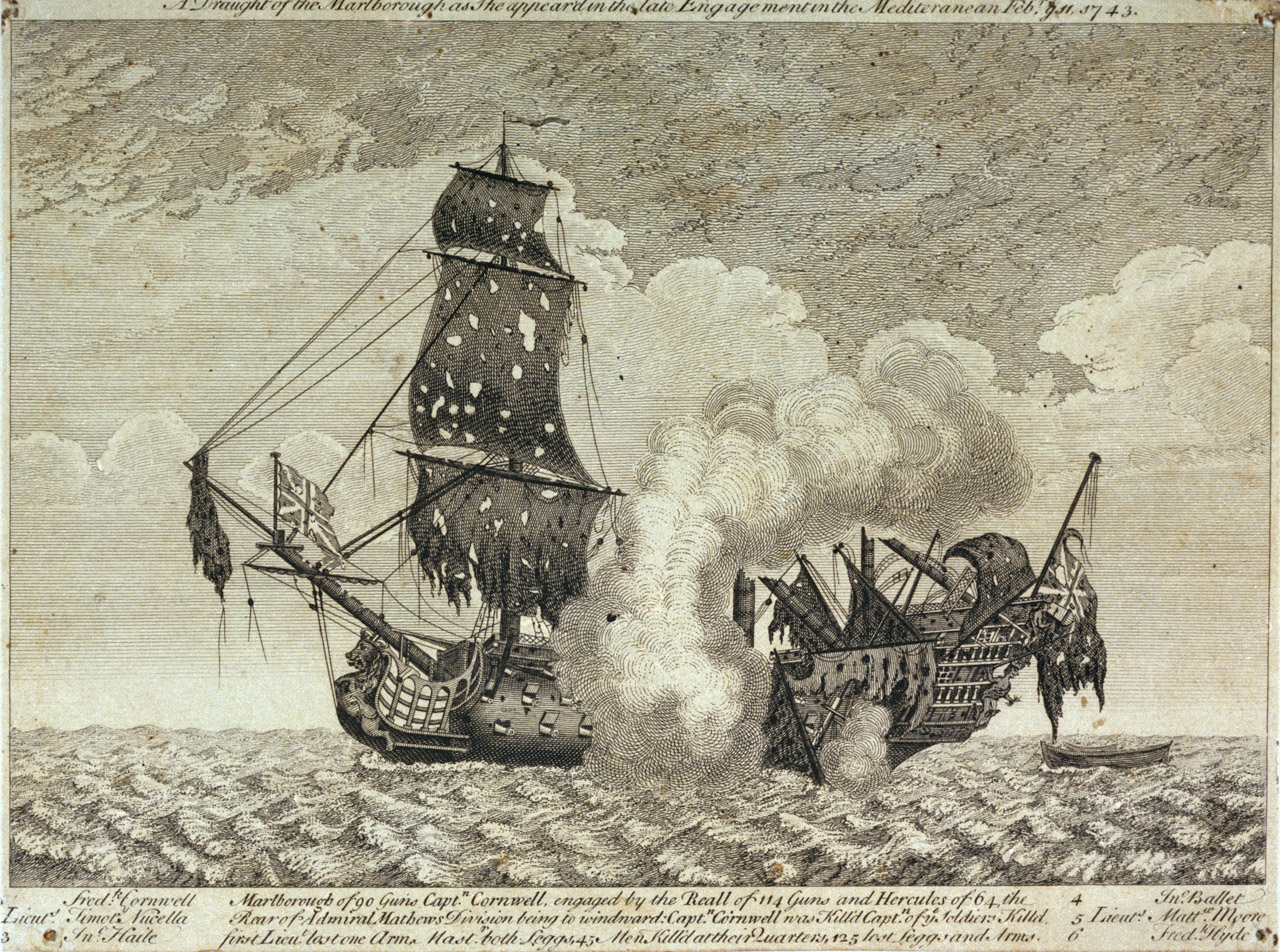
HMS Marlborough after the battle of Toulon

In 1743, still sailing in Mathews' Mediterranean fleet, he took up his final command: HMS Marlborough. On 11 February 1744 he was next astern of Mathews' flagship, HMS Namur, during the botched Battle of Toulon. Marlborough and Namur bore the brunt of the Spanish fire, with Marlborough losing 43 killed and 120 wounded from its crew of 750 men. Amongst the killed was Cornewall, with both his legs carried away by a chain-shot early in the action, living only long enough "to express the agony he was in, by shaking his head at the surgeon." Command passed to his cousin, Frederick Cornewall, who was First Lieutenant aboard the Marlborough, but he too was severely wounded and lost his right arm. Captain Cornewall was buried at sea.

News of Cornewall's death was greeted by a public show of grief comparable with that following the loss of Nelson sixty years later, though the man had led a solid but unspectacular naval career. As Horace Walpole later put it, "In the present dearth of glory [Cornewall] is canonized, though poor man! he had been tried twice the year before for cowardice."

== Family ==
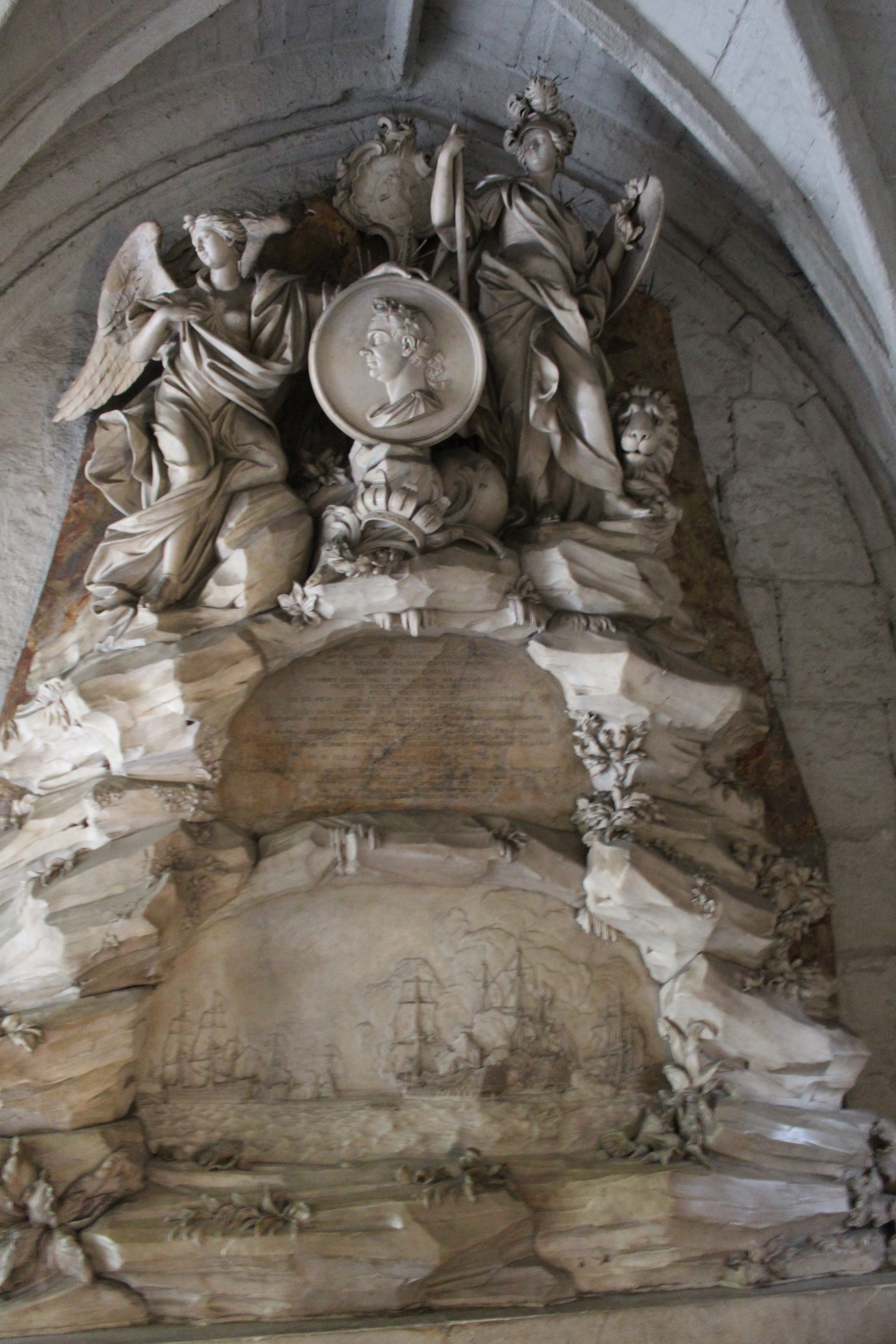
The monument to Cornewall in Westminster Abbey

Cornewall never married, but he had an Illegitimate son by a Mrs Hannah Southwark of Boston named Thomas Cornewall (d. 1796), to whom he left £4000 in his will, equivalent to £861,000 in 2025. Thomas would follow his father into the Royal Navy and became a Captain himself in 1757. The bulk of James Cornewall's estate was left to his Half-brother Henry Cornewall, with instructions that it should pass to their brother Velters on Henry's death.

== Memorials ==
In 1747 a monument to Cornewall was commissioned to stand in Westminster Abbey. Designed by Sir Robert Taylor, it was unveiled in 1749 and was the first ever monument to be erected by Parliament at public expense, as well as probably being the earliest representation of Britannia on a monument. It stood at the West end of the nave near the entrance of St George's Chapel. In 1882 the monument was modified to make a doorway into the chapel, and in 1932 it was moved altogether when St George's was made a war memorial chapel. It now stands in the entrance archway to the Abbey's Cloister. An earlier attempt to move the monument to make room for one to Lord Salisbury was dropped after navy objections.

A ship named HMS Cornwall in honour of the Captain was launched in 1761. Frederick Cornewall was its first commander.

Parliament of Great Britain
Preceded by John Birch; Uvedale Tomkins Price	Member of Parliament for Weobley; 1732–1734; With: Uvedale Tomkins Price	Succeeded by John Birch; Sir John Buckworth
Preceded by John Birch; Sir John Buckworth	Member of Parliament for Weobley; 1737–1741; With: Sir John Buckworth	Succeeded by Lieutenant-Colonel The Lord Carpenter; The Viscount Palmerston
