= John Birch (Roundhead) =

English soldier and politician

Colonel John Birch MP, JP
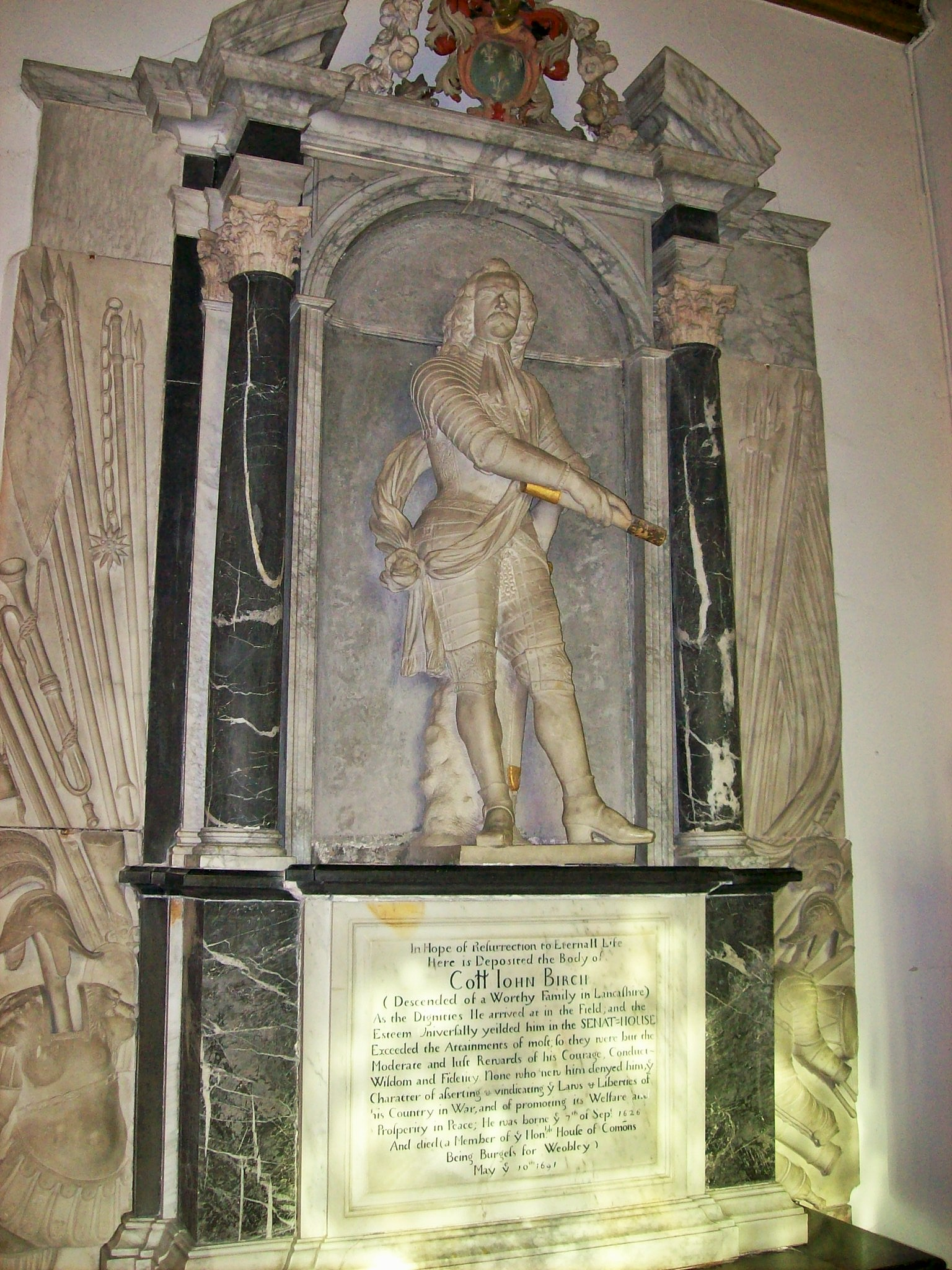
- John Birch's monument, St Peter & St Paul's, Weobley (Note: Repaired after being damaged in 1694, this incorrectly gives his date of birth as 1626)

MP for Weobley
- In office 1679–1691

MP for Penryn
- In office 1661–1679

High Steward of Leominster
- In office 1648–1660

MP for Leominster
- In office 1646–1660

Personal details
- Born: 7 September 1615 Ardwick Manor, near Manchester
- Died: 10 May 1691 (aged 75) Garnstone Manor, Weobly
- Resting place: St Peter and St Paul's, Weobley
- Spouse(s): Alice Deane (died 1671); Winifred Norris (died 1717)
- Relations: Thomas Birch (1608-1678)
- Children: 5
- Parent(s): Samuel Birch of Birch Hall and Mary (nee Smith) of Doblane House
- Occupation: Wine merchant, soldier, politician

Military service
- Allegiance: England 1642–1646
- Years of service: 1642 to 1646
- Rank: Colonel
- Commands: Governor of Hereford 1645-1646
- Battles/wars: First English Civil War; Bristol 1643; Basing House; Alton; Arundel; Cheriton; Cropredy Bridge; Plymouth; Bridgwater; Bristol 1645; Siege of Hereford; Stow-on-the-Wold; Siege of Goodrich Castle

Colonel John Birch (7 September 1615 – 10 May 1691) was a soldier and politician from Manchester in England. He fought for the Parliamentarians in the First English Civil War, and was a Member of Parliament at various times between 1646 and 1691.

Considered a moderate, he was excluded from Parliament in Pride's Purge of December 1648, and prevented from taking his seat for Leominster under the Protectorate. After the 1660 Stuart Restoration, he was restored to favour and sat on over 122 Parliamentary Committees. During the 1679 Exclusion Crisis, he supported barring the Catholic James II from the throne, and subsequently backed the 1689 Glorious Revolution.

A contemporary Gilbert Burnet later described him as "...the roughest and boldest speaker in the House, [with]] the language and phrases of a carrier...he spoke always with much life and heat, but judgment was not his talent."

== Personal details ==
John Birch was born 7 September 1615, eldest surviving son of Samuel and Mary Birch. A wealthy Presbyterian merchant, his father owned Ardwick Manor, outside Manchester. He had two brothers, Samuel (1621-1683), and Thomas (1633-1700). He moved to Bristol in 1633, where he set up as a wine merchant.

Birch married Alice Deane (died 1671), daughter of a Bristol merchant. They had five children who lived to adulthood; John (c. 1647 – after 1683), Samuel (died 1704), Mary (ca. 1645–1728), Elizabeth and Sarah (died 1702). There were no children from his second marriage to Winifred Norris, who died in 1717.

== Wars of the Three Kingdoms ==
At the start of the First English Civil War in August 1642, Birch was a captain in the Bristol militia and served with the Parliamentarian garrison. He later recorded that some of his men viewed the war as a break from routine, with better pay and rations than in civilian life and were concerned it might end too soon.

After the Royalists captured the town in June 1643, the garrison was given a pass to London. With the help of Sir Arthur Haselrig, Birch was commissioned in the army commanded by William Waller, and quickly proved an energetic and courageous officer. In November 1643, he served in the first Siege of Basing House, and was slightly wounded in the Battle of Alton on 13 December. Less than a week later, he was shot in the stomach in an assault on Arundel Castle, allegedly surviving only because the cold weather stemmed the flow of blood.

Birch recovered in time to fight at Cheriton in March 1644, a Parliamentarian success that forced Charles I onto the defensive in South East England. At Cropredy Bridge in June, he commanded the rearguard that held the bridge long enough to allow Waller's main force to retreat. Shortly after this, Birch raised a regiment of infantry which was shipped to Plymouth to reinforce the garrison. He spent the rest of the war in South West England and the Welsh Marches.

Although not part of the New Model Army, his unit took part in its 1645 Western Campaign including the capture of Bridgwater and Bristol. On 17 December 1645, Birch led a surprise night-time attack on the Royalist garrison of Hereford, which had recently repulsed a month-long siege by Scots Covenanters, and the Royalist commander Barnabas Scudamore was later accused of betrayal. Appointed Governor of Hereford, Birch also fought at Stow-on-the-Wold in March 1646, the last major battle of the war, and captured Goodrich Castle in June, just before the war ended.

Key locations mentioned in article

However, victory resulted in increasingly bitter disputes over the post-war political settlement between radicals within the New Model like Oliver Cromwell, and the moderate party in Parliament, which included his former commander William Waller, and Denzil Holles. At the same time, Parliament's desperate economic position made reductions in the military a matter of urgency. Birch became involved in a struggle with the other regional Parliamentarian commander, Edward Harley, as both men sought to ensure their troops were the ones retained.

One of the few members of the local landed gentry to support Parliament in 1642, Harley defeated Birch in 1646 as MP for Herefordshire. Despite this setback, in September Birch was elected for Leominster, but under the Self-denying Ordinance was required to give up his military commission. Appointed High steward of Leominster in 1648, he also invested heavily in purchasing church lands, which made him extremely wealthy. Disputes over a peace settlement with Charles I and religious policy split Parliament between moderates like Birch, and more radical religious Independents such as Oliver Cromwell, including his cousin Thomas Birch. After the Second English Civil War he was excluded from Parliament in Pride's Purge of 6 December 1648.

== 1660 Restoration and after ==
Birch met with Charles II prior to the Battle of Worcester in September 1651 but avoided direct participation, possibly due to the influence of his cousin Thomas, who remained loyal to the Protectorate. He retained his Leominster seat throughout the Commonwealth, although he was not allowed to take his seat, and later claimed to have been arrested 21 times. After the Stuart Restoration in 1660, he was removed as High Steward of Leominster, and forced to sell his lands back to the church, ending his influence in the area. However, in 1661 he was returned as MP for Penryn, in the Cavalier Parliament.

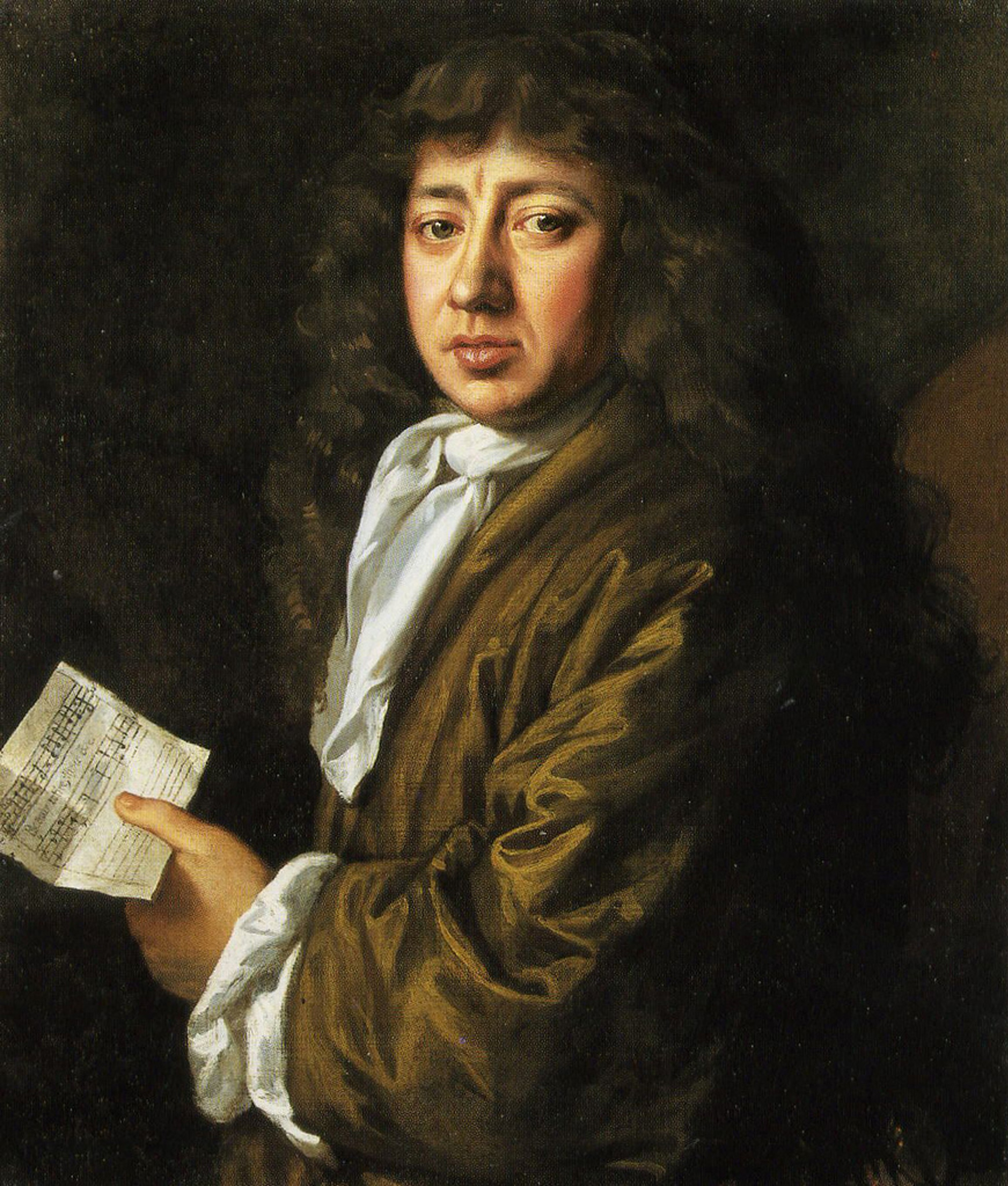
Samuel Pepys, who worked closely with Birch on funding the Royal Navy

Although he never held high political office, Birch sat on numerous committees, especially those connected to public spending and taxes, where he proved a relentless and astute auditor. His presence on the committee to review naval expenditure after the Second Anglo-Dutch War brought him into contact with Pepys, who noted he "do take it upon him to defend us, and do mightily do me right in all his discourse". According to one commentator, he was "the roughest and boldest speaker in the House, who talked in the language and phrases of a carrier, but with a beauty and eloquence that was always acceptable".

The Act of Uniformity 1662 expelled Presbyterians from the Church of England, among them being John, and his brother Samuel, who was evicted from his parish of Bampton, Oxfordshire as a result. However, Birch voted for the 1673 Test Act, which required holders of public office holders to be Anglicans, and became a member of the church. This was largely due to his opposition to Catholicism, and in the Exclusion Crisis, he supported barring Charles' Catholic brother James from the throne.

Birch purchased Garnstone Manor, Weobly, in 1661, giving him control of its Parliamentary seat. First elected in 1679, he held it until his death in 1691, with the exception of 1685, when he stood down following the accession of James II. He regained it after the November 1688 Glorious Revolution, and was prominent in debates over the Bill of Rights and the Revolutionary settlement.

His last recorded Parliamentary appearance was in April 1690; he died at home on 10 May 1691, and was buried at St Peter and St Paul's, Weobley. The railings around his monument extended into the altar space, and were removed in 1694 by Gilbert Ironside, Bishop of Hereford; the holes are still visible. His youngest daughter, Sarah, inherited Garnstone, on condition she marry her cousin, another John Birch; he held the Weobley seat almost continuously from 1701, until his death in 1735.

== Sources ==
- Ackroyd, Peter (2014). Civil War: The History of England Volume III. Macmillan. ISBN 978-0230706415.
- Burke, John (1838). A Genealogical and Heraldic History of the Commoners of Great Britain, Volume 4. Henry Colburn.
- Burnet, Gilbert (1734). History of My Own Time; Volume II (2015 ed.). Andesite. ISBN 978-1298711793.
- Colonel John Birch’s Regiment. "Colonel John Birch's Regiment of Foot". BCW Project.
- Ferris, John P (1983). BIRCH, John (1615-91), of The Homme, nr. Leominster and Garnstone Manor, Weobley, Herefordshire in The History of Parliament: the House of Commons 1660–1690. Boydell & Brewer.
- Gentles, Ian (2002). Kenyon, John; Ohlmeyer, Jane (eds.). The Civil Wars in England in The Civil Wars; a Military History of England, Scotland and Ireland 1638-1660. OUP. ISBN 978-0192802781.
- Hibbert, Christopher (1993). Cavaliers and Roundheads; the English at war 1642-1649 (1994 ed.). Harper Collins. ISBN 978-0586090084.
- Hopper, Andrew (2012). Turncoats and Renegadoes: Changing Sides During the English Civil Wars. Oxford University Press.
- Hull, Lise; Whitehorne, Stephen (2008). Great Castles of Britain & Ireland. New Holland Publishers. ISBN 978-1-84773-130-2.
- Key, Newton E (2004). "Birch, John". Oxford Dictionary of National Biography (online ed.). Oxford University Press. doi:10.1093/ref:odnb/2429. (Subscription, Wikipedia Library access or UK public library membership required.)
- Pepys, Samuel. "Friday 21 February 1668 in The Diary of Samuel Pepys". Pepys Diary Online.
- Plant, David (23 September 2006). "John Birch". BCW Project.
- Royle, Trevor (2004). Civil War: The Wars of the Three Kingdoms 1638–1660 (2006 ed.). Abacus. ISBN 978-0-349-11564-1.
- Sedgwick, Romney (1970). BIRCH, John II (c.1666-1735), of Garnstone Manor, Weobley, Herefs. in The History of Parliament: the House of Commons 1715–1754. CUP.

== Bibliography ==
- Willis-Bund, John William (1905). The Civil War In Worcestershire, 1642-1646: And the Scotch Invasion Of 1651. Birmingham: The Midland Educational Company. pp. 176–178.

Parliament of England
Preceded by Sampson Eure; Walter Kyrle	Member of Parliament for Leominster; 1645–1648; With: Walter Kyrle	Succeeded by Leominster not represented
Preceded by Leominster not represented	Member of Parliament for Leominster; 1653–1661; With: Edward Freeman 1659–60; Edward Pytts 1660–61	Succeeded by Ranald Grahme; Humphrey Cornewall
Preceded by Samuel Enys; James Robyns	Member of Parliament for Penryn; 1661 – 1679; With: William Pendarves 1661–73; Sir Robert Southwell from 1673	Succeeded by Francis Trefusis; Sir Robert Southwell
Preceded by John Barneby; William Gregory	Weobley; 1679–1685; With: William Gregory 1679; John Booth 1679–1685	Succeeded by Robert Price; Henry Cornewall
Preceded by Robert Price; Henry Cornewall	Weobley; 1689–1691; With: James Morgan 1689–1690; Robert Price 1690–1691	Succeeded by Thomas Foley; Robert Price
