= Nicholas Philpott =

Nicholas Philpott (c. 1695–1732), of Newton, Herefordshire, was a British politician who sat in the House of Commons from 1718 to 1727. Philpott was the eldest son of Nicholas Philpott of Hereford and Vowchurch, Herefordshire. He matriculated at Merton College, Oxford on 22 April 1714, aged 18.

Philpott was returned as Member of Parliament for Weobley at a by-election on 22 November 1718. Lord Coningsby undertook that the Government would pay half his expenses. In Parliament he voted with the Administration on the repeal of the Occasional Conformity and Schism Acts and on the Peerage Bill. He was returned again at the 1722 general election. He was put forward as candidate at the 1727 general election but withdrew on a compromise with the Tories.

Philpott married Elizabeth before April 1727. He lost his sanity and shot himself on 6 July 1732.

Parliament of Great Britain
Preceded by John Birch; Vice-Admiral Charles Cornewall	Member of Parliament for Weobley; 1718–1727; With: John Birch	Succeeded by John Birch; Uvedale Tomkins Price
