= Joseph Gascoigne Nightingale =

British politician

- Monument commemorating Lady Elizabeth Nightingale and Joseph Nightingale in St Michael's Chapel, Westminster Abbey, London

Member of Parliament for Stafford
- In office 1727–1734
- Preceded by: Thomas Foley; 1st Viscount Chetwynd
- Succeeded by: Thomas Foley; Hon. William Chetwynd

Personal details
- Born: Joseph Gascoigne; 19 December 1695
- Died: 20 July 1752 (aged 56) Mamhead House, Devon
- Party: Tory
- Spouse: Lady Elizabeth Shirley
- Education: Trinity College, Cambridge

Joseph Gascoigne Nightingale (19 December 1695 – 20 July 1752), of Enfield, Middlesex, was a British politician who sat in the House of Commons from 1727 to 1734.

== Early life ==
Nightingale was baptized as Gascoigne on 19 December 1695, the eldest surviving son of the Rev. Joseph Gascoigne, vicar of Enfield, and his wife Anne Theobald (married 1687). She was the daughter of Francis Theobald of Barking, Suffolk and his wife Anne Nightingale, who was the sister of Sir Thomas Nightingale, 2nd Baronet.

He was educated at Enfield under Dr Uvedale and was admitted at Trinity College, Cambridge on 1 July 1712.

In 1721 he succeeded his father and in 1722 he succeeded his younger brother Robert to the estates worth nearly £300,000 of Sir Robert Nightingale, 4th Baronet. He thereupon assumed the additional name of Nightingale.

He married Lady Elizabeth Shirley, daughter of Washington Shirley, 2nd Earl Ferrers and his wife Mary Levinge, of Chartley, near Stafford on 24 June 1725.

== Career ==
Nightingale was returned as Member of Parliament for Stafford at the 1727 British general election. He voted with the Opposition in every recorded division. He did not stand again at the 1734 British general election.

== Later years ==
Nightingale's wife Elizabeth died on 17 August 1731 following the premature birth of her daughter Elizabeth as a result of the shock caused by a violent flash of lightning. They had three sons, Washington, Joseph and Robert.

Nightingale moved to Mamhead house in Devon for respite and recovery. He died on 16 July 1752. Of the sons, only Washington survived him by only two years. His daughter Elizabeth also survived him and married Wilmot Vaughan, 1st Earl of Lisburne but died, also in childbirth, in 1755. The estates thus passed to the Earls of Lisburne.

Nightingale and his wife are commemorated by a spectacular monument in Westminster Abbey by the sculptor Louis Francois Roubiliac. It depicts a skeletal Death emerging from his prison to aim a fatal dart at the dying figure of Elizabeth Nightingale while her husband protects her. The monument lists the year of her death as 1734 instead of 1731. The two are buried at the Abbey in a nearby vault.

Parliament of Great Britain
Preceded by Thomas Foley; 1st Viscount Chetwynd	Member of Parliament for Stafford; 1727–1734; With: 1st Viscount Chetwynd	Succeeded by Hon. William Chetwynd; Thomas Foley
