= James Robyns =

Member of the Parliament of England

James Robyns was an English lawyer and politician who sat in the House of Commons in 1660.

Robyns was born before 1625 and became an attorney. He had an estate at Penryn in Cornwall, and obtained a reversion of the assay of tin from King Charles I. His estate was sequestered in 1652 but was discharged a year later as there was no evidence of delinquency.

In 1660, Robyns was elected Member of Parliament for Penryn in the Convention Parliament. He became paymaster of the stannaries in 1661. He was steward of Penryn and Helston manors and commissioner for assessment for Cornwall from 1664 to 1674. He was also stannator for Penwith and Kerrier in 1673.

Robyns died after 1682.

Robyns' daughter married Sir Vyell Vyvyan, 2nd Baronet.

Parliament of England
Vacant Penryn not represented in the restored Rump Title last held by John Fox; Thomas Silly	Member of Parliament for Penryn; 1660–1661; With: Samuel Enys	Succeeded by William Pendarves; John Birch
