= Samuel Enys =

English politician

Samuel Enys (11 October 1611 – 8 November 1697) was an English merchant and politician who sat in the House of Commons in 1660.

Enys was the third son of John Enys of Enys and his wife Winifred Rise, daughter of Thomas Rise of Trewardreva, Constantine, and was educated at Truro Grammar School. When he was 16, he was apprenticed to an English merchant at San Sebastian. At the start of the English Civil War he fought a duel "maintaining the King’s honour and dignity" and when he visited England in 1642, he provisioned a kinsman to fight in the Royalist army. He was imprisoned in the parliamentary garrison at Plymouth and was released through the intervention of John St Aubyn and a loan of £100. He stayed abroad until after the last Royalist stronghold in Cornwall at Pendennis surrendered. He became one of the most successful merchants in Penryn and Falmouth and purchased lands to enlarge the family estate. Before the restoration he gave money to support the exiled court and in 1659 arranged the purchase of 300 guns in France which were stored at Trelawne. However the advance of George Monck into England avoided the need to use them.

In April 1660, Enys was elected Member of Parliament for Penryn although there were objections that he was a cavalier on account of the duel he fought. He was captain of militia for Cornwall from April 1660 to 1664. In 1661 he was appointed joint farmer of tin coinage for the Duchy of Cornwall at a rent of £2000 per year, but ran into conflict with James Robyns the say-master and the farm was sub-let in 1664. He was commissioner for assessment for Cornwall from 1661 to 1680. In 1670 he became J.P. for Cornwall. He became an alderman at Penryn in 1685 remaining until October 1688 and became commissioner for assessment again for the year 1689 to 1690.

Enys died at the age of 86 and was buried at Gluvias.

Enys married Elizabeth Pendarves, daughter of Samuel Pendarves of Roskrow, Gluvias on 5 July 1647. They had six sons and a daughter. His wife died on 28 May 1705.

Parliament of England
Vacant Penryn not represented in the restored Rump Title last held by John Fox; Thomas Silly	Member of Parliament for Penryn; 1660–1661; With: James Robyns	Succeeded by William Pendarves; John Birch
