= Buckworth (disambiguation) =

Buckworth is a village in the Huntingdonshire district of Cambridgeshire.

Buckworth may also refer to:

- Buckworth, Surrey
- John Buckworth (disambiguation)
