= Sir Uvedale Price, 1st Baronet =

English author and landowner

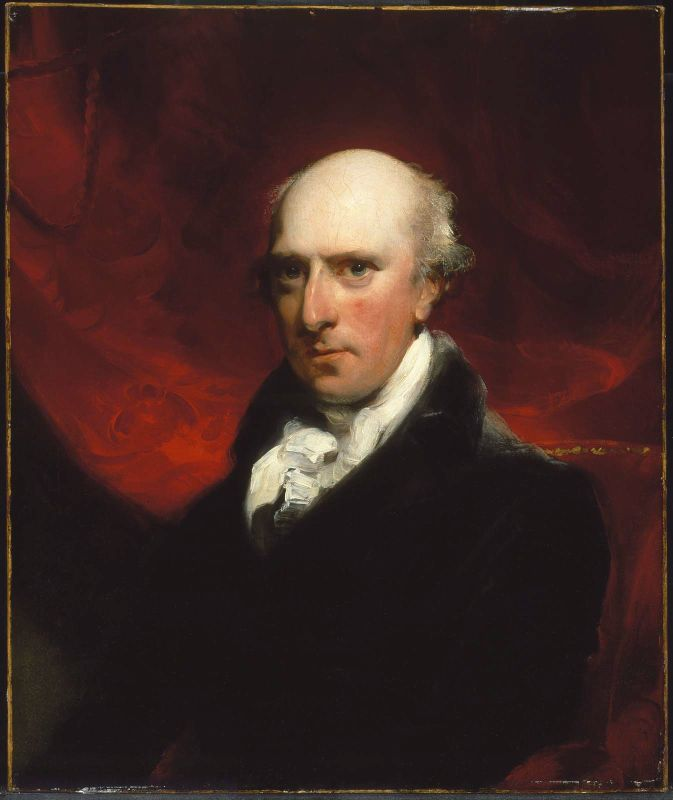
Portrait (c. 1799), oil on canvas, of Sir Uvedale Price, 1st Baronet (1747–1829), by Sir Thomas Lawrence, (1769–1830), 76.2 x 63.5 cm

Sir Uvedale Price, 1st Baronet (baptised 14 April 1747 – 14 September 1829), writer of the Essay on the Picturesque, As Compared with the Sublime and The Beautiful (1794), was a Herefordshire landowner who was at the heart of the 'Picturesque debate' of the 1790s.

== His life ==
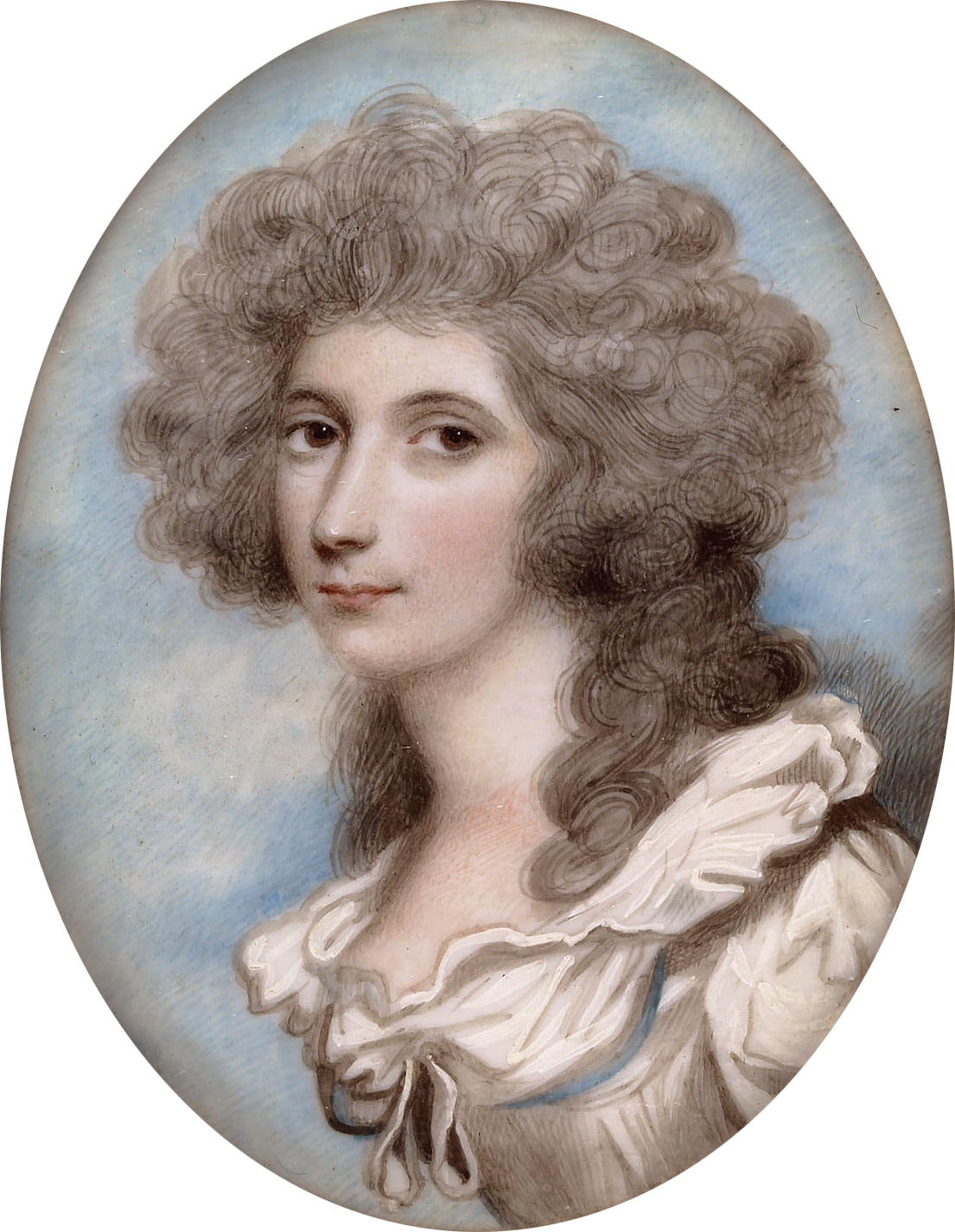
Caroline Price (Andrew Plimer)

Uvedale Price was the eldest son of Robert Price, an amateur artist, by his wife the Hon. Sarah Barrington, daughter of John Shute Barrington, 1st Viscount Barrington. Educated at Eton and at Christ Church, Oxford, Price inherited the family estate of Foxley (in Yazor in Herefordshire) when he came of age in 1768, a few years after the death of his father in 1761 and of his grandfather (Uvedale Tomkins Price) in 1764. As a young man Price was a figure on London's social scene, and was once described as the "macaroni of his age," but with his inheritance and his marriage to Lady Caroline Carpenter, youngest daughter of George Carpenter, 1st Earl of Tyrconnel, he settled down at Foxley to tend to the estate and develop his theories on landscape, as well as equally controversial work on the pronunciation of the Classical languages. He served as High Sheriff of Herefordshire in 1793, and was created a baronet on 12 February 1828.

During his life, Price was befriended by Sir George Beaumont and his wife Margaret Beaumont, with whom he corresponded extensively. He was also a lifetime friend of the statesman Charles James Fox as well as being acquainted with William Wordsworth, and in later life, a correspondent of Elizabeth Barrett Browning. He died in 1829 aged 82, having finally printed his work on Greek and Latin pronunciation. His only son Robert succeeded as 2nd (and last) baronet.

== The Picturesque and Landscape theory ==
Price developed his ideas with his close neighbour Richard Payne Knight, whose poem 'The Landscape' was published the same year as Price's Essay delineating his theories on "The Picturesque" as a mode of landscape.

Well before Price's Essay or Knight's poem, however, the term pittoresque was used in early 18th century France to refer to a property of being "in the style of a painter". Pope, in his "Letter to Caryll", brought the word into English as "picturesque" in 1712. The term was used by various English authors throughout the 18th century (cf. Oxford English Dictionary 'picturesque') before being described by Bagehot in Literary Studies (1879) as "a quality distinct from that of beauty, or sublimity, or grandeur."

For Price, the Picturesque was more specifically defined as being located between the Beautiful and the Sublime. In practical application this meant that his preferred mode of landscaping was to retain old trees, rutted paths, and textured slopes, rather than to sweep all these away in the style that had been practised by Lancelot "Capability" Brown. Price contested, for example, the obsession of "The Beautiful" with Classical and natural symmetry, arguing instead for a less formal and more asymmetrical interpretation of nature.

Price's ideas led to much debate in artistic and literary circles: they were parodied, for example, by Jane Austen in Northanger Abbey. Price republished the Essay several times, with additional material, and entered into a public debate with Humphry Repton over the latter's approach to landscape design. He similarly fell out with Payne Knight, whose theories of landscape betrayed a more esoteric attitude.

== Notes ==
Baronetage of the United Kingdom
New title	Baronet (of Foxley); 1828–1829	Succeeded by Robert Price
