= Weobley (constituency) =

Parliamentary constituency in the United Kingdom, 1801–1832

- Former borough constituency for the House of Commons

1628–1832
- Seats: Two
- Replaced by: Herefordshire

Weobley was a parliamentary borough in Herefordshire, which elected two Members of Parliament (MPs) to the House of Commons in 1295 and from 1628 until 1832, when the borough was abolished by the Great Reform Act.

== Members of Parliament ==
=== MPs 1628–1660 ===
Parliament	First Member	Second Member
	Weobley re-enfranchised in 1628	
1628	William Walter	William Tomkins
1629–1640	No Parliaments summoned	
1640 (Apr)	William Tomkins	Thomas Tomkins
1640 (Nov)	Arthur Jones	Thomas Tomkins
1645	Robert Andrews	William Crowther
1653	Weobley not represented in Barebones parliament	
1654,1656	Weobley not represented in 1st and 2nd Protectorate parliaments	
1659	Herbert Perrott	Robert Andrews

=== MPs 1660–1832 ===
Election	First member	First party	Second member	Second party
1660, April 13	James Pytts		Richard Weston	
August 1660	Thomas Tomkyns		Herbert Perrott	
April 1661	Thomas Tomkyns		John Barneby	
1675	Sir Thomas Williams, Bt		John Barneby	
1678	William Gregory		John Barneby	
February 1679	William Gregory		John Birch	
September 1679	John Booth		John Birch	
1685	Henry Cornewall		Robert Price	
1689	John Birch		James Morgan	
1690	John Birch		Robert Price	
1691	Thomas Foley		Robert Price	
January 1701	Henry Cornewall		John Birch	
November 1701	Robert Price		John Birch	
1702	Robert Price		Henry Cornewall	
1705	John Birch		Henry Cornewall	
May 1708	John Birch		Henry Thynne	
December 1708	John Birch		Henry Gorges	
1710	John Birch		Henry Cornewall	
1713	John Birch		Uvedale Tomkins Price	
February 1715	Paul Foley		Vice-Admiral Charles Cornewall	
June 1715	John Birch		Vice-Admiral Charles Cornewall	
1718	John Birch		Nicholas Philpott	
1727	John Birch		Uvedale Tomkins Price	
1732	James Cornewall		Uvedale Tomkins Price	
1734	John Birch		Sir John Buckworth, Bt	
October 1735	Seat vacant pending resolution of disputed election		Sir John Buckworth, Bt	
1737	James Cornewall		Sir John Buckworth, Bt	
1741	Lieutenant-Colonel The Lord Carpenter		The Viscount Palmerston	
July 1747	Mansel Powell		Captain Savage Mostyn	
December 1747	Viscount Perceval		Captain Savage Mostyn	
1754	John Craster		Captain Savage Mostyn	
1757	John Craster		George Venables-Vernon	Whig
1761	Marquess of Titchfield	Whig	Hon. Henry Thynne	
1762	William Lynch		Hon. Henry Thynne	
1768	Simon Luttrell		Hon. Henry Thynne	
1770	Simon Luttrell		Bamber Gascoyne	
1774	Sir William Lynch		John St Leger Douglas	
1780	Andrew Bayntun-Rolt		John St Leger Douglas	
1783	Andrew Bayntun-Rolt		(Sir) John Scott	
1786	Hon. Thomas Thynne	Tory	(Sir) John Scott	
1790	Lord George Thynne		(Sir) John Scott	
May 1796	Lord George Thynne		Lord John Thynne	
December 1796	Lord George Thynne		Inigo Freeman Thomas	
1800	Lord George Thynne		Sir Charles Talbot, Bt	
1802	Lord George Thynne		Robert Steele	
1807	Lord George Thynne		Lord Guernsey	
January 1812	Lord George Thynne		Lord Apsley	Tory
October 1812	Viscount St Asaph		William Bathurst	
1813	James Lenox William Naper		William Bathurst	
1816	James Lenox William Naper		Lord Frederick Cavendish-Bentinck	Tory
1818	Viscount Weymouth		Lord Frederick Cavendish-Bentinck	Tory
1820	Sir George Cockburn, Bt	Tory	Lord Frederick Cavendish-Bentinck	Tory
1824	Sir George Cockburn, Bt	Tory	Lord Henry Thynne	Tory
1826	Sir George Cockburn, Bt	Tory	Lord William Thynne	
1828	Lord Henry Thynne	Tory	Lord William Thynne	
1831	Lord Henry Thynne	Tory	Lord Edward Thynne	
