= HMS Portsmouth (1690) =

History

England
- Name: HMS Portsmouth
- Ordered: 28 June 1689
- Builder: Royal Dockyard, Portsmouth
- Launched: 13 May 1690
- Commissioned: 1690
- Captured: 11 October 1696
- Fate: Captured by four French privateers

General characteristics
- Type: 32-gun fifth rate
- Tons burthen: 41192/94 bm
- Length: 106 ft 3 in (32.4 m) gundeck; 89 ft 0 in (27.1 m) keel for tonnage
- Beam: 29 ft 6 in (9.0 m)
- Depth of hold: 10 ft 0 in (3.0 m)
- Sail plan: ship-rigged
- Armament: as Built; 4 × 4 demi-culverines on wooden trucks (LD); 20 × sakers on wooden trucks (UD); 4 × 4 minions on wooden trucks (QD)

HMS Portsmouth was a fifth rate built under the 1689 programme built at Deptford Dockyard. Her guns were listed under old terms for guns as demi-culverines, (Note: A demi-culverine was a gun of 3,400 pounds with a four-inch bore firing a 9.5-pound shot with an eight-pound powder charge.) sakers (Note: A sacar or saker was a gun of 1,400 pounds with a 3.5-inch bore firing a 5.5-pound shot with a 5.5-pound powder charge.) and minions. (Note: A minion was a gun of 1,000 pounds with a 3.5-inch bore firing a 4-pound shot with a 4-pound powder charge.) After commissioning she spent her short career with the Fleet in Home Waters. She was taken by the French in 1696.

Portsmouth was the sixth named vessel since it was used for a 46-gun ship.

== Construction ==
She was ordered on 28 June 1689 from Portsmouth Dockyard to be built under the guidance of Master Shipwright William Stigant. She was launched on 13 May 1690.

== Commissioned service ==
She was commissioned in 1690 under the command of Captain Francis Wyvill, RN for service with the Channel Fleet. In 1891 she was under the command of Captain William Whetstone, RN followed by Captain John Bridges, RN on 17 June 1691 then in 1693 Captain Charles Britiffe, RN was her commander. In concert with HMS Deptford she took the 36-gun St Malouine privateer, La Hyacinthe, in November 1693. She then joined Russel's Fleet in October/November 1694. Captain Gabriel Millerson, RN took command for service with Admiral Benbow's squadron in 1696.

== Loss ==
HMS Portsmouth was taken by four French privateers off Romney on 11 October 1696.
