= Thomas Tomkins (MP) =

English politician (c.1605–1674)

Sir Thomas Tomkins JP (c. 1605 – 31 December 1674) was an English politician who sat in the House of Commons at various times between 1640 and 1674. He supported the Royalist cause in the English Civil War.

== Early life ==
Tomkins was the fifth but second surviving son of Anne (née Boyle) Tomkins and James Tomkins of Monnington on Wye, Herefordshire, and of Garnestone south of Weobley. His ancestors had been gentry in Herefordshire since the 15th century, but were of minor importance before the Tudor period, and his father, who was responsible for the re-enfranchisement of Weobley in 1628, was the first of the family to sit in Parliament.

== Career ==
In April 1640, Tomkins was elected Member of Parliament for Weobley in the Short Parliament. He was re-elected MP for Weobley for the Long Parliament in November 1640. He supported the king and was disabled form sitting in parliament on 22 January 1644.

He succeeded to the family estates, including Garnstone Manor, Weobley, upon his elder brother William's death in 1640, and was knighted in 1663. Tomkins was elected MP for Weobley for the Convention Parliament in August 1660 after the previous election was declared void. He was re-elected MP for Weobley for the Cavalier Parliament in 1661 and sat until his death in 1674.

== Personal life ==
On 22 September 1633, Tomkins was married to Mary Pye (b. 1618), a daughter of Sir Walter Pye. Together, they were the parents of one son, who died young, and three daughters, including:

- Anne Tomkins, who married her cousin, Roger Vaughan, MP for Hereford, in 1657; Garnstone Manor was transferred to Vaughan as Anne's dowry.

After his first wife's death, he married Lucy Uvedale, a daughter of Sir William Uvedale, of Wickham and widow of Thomas Neale of Warnford, on 21 February 1648. From her first marriage, she was mother to Thomas Neale, a longtime MP. Together, they were the parents of:

- Uvedale Tomkins (1649–1692), who married Mary Capell.

Tomkins died on 31 December 1674.

Parliament of England
Parliament suspended since 1629	Member of Parliament for Weobley; 1640–1644; With: William Tomkins 1640; Arthur Jones Lord Ranelagh 1640–1641	Succeeded by Robert Andrews; William Crowther
