= Sir John Buckworth, 2nd Baronet =

British politician

Sir John Buckworth, 2nd Baronet (1704–1759), of Rathbone Place, London, and West Sheen, Surrey, was a British politician who sat in the House of Commons from 1734 to 1741.

Buckworth was baptized on 5 April 1704, the eldest son of Sir John Buckworth, 1st Baronet, Sheriff of London, and his wife Elizabeth Hall, daughter of John Hall of Yarmouth, Norfolk. He succeeded his father in the baronetcy on 12 June 1709. He was educated at Eton College in about 1716 and joined the army. In 1718 he was a lieutenant and captain in the 1st Foot Guards but was out of the army by 1727.

Buckworth stood for Parliament at Heytesbury in 1722 but was defeated. He was elected as Member of Parliament for Weobley in the 1734 British general election and served as an opposition politician. He did not stand at the 1741 British general election, but ran again for the Weobley constituency in 1747 and was defeated.

Buckworth married Mary Jane Clermont, sister of Angelique Faicho Clermont after 1741. He died on 31 December 1758 at Rathbone Place and was buried in Eton College Chapel. He had no legitimate issue but in his will refers to sons Charles Buckworth, a lieutenant in the Fusiliers, and Francis, a Royal Navy officer. A daughter, Frances Mary, was the wife of Nathaniel Gould. He was succeeded in the baronetcy by his brother Everard.

Parliament of Great Britain
Preceded by James Cornewall; Uvedale Tomkins Price	Member of Parliament for Weobley; 1734–1741; With: John Birch1734-1735; James Cornewall1737-1741	Succeeded by Lieutenant-Colonel The Lord Carpenter; The Viscount Palmerston
Baronetage of England
Preceded by John Buckworth	Baronet (of Sheen); 1709-1759	Succeeded by Everard Buckworth
