= Henry Lingen =

Sir Henry Lingen (23 October 1612 – 22 January 1662), Lord of Sutton, Lingen and Stoke Edith, was a Royalist military commander in Herefordshire during the English Civil War, and later a member of parliament. He was the son of Edward Lingen and Blanche Bodenham. He fathered 2 sons, Henry and William and 7 daughters, Elizabeth, Joan, Blanch, Mary (Dobbyns), Cecilia, Frances (Unett), and Alice (Herring). Both sons died without issue but the daughters left considerable posterity.

== Ancestry ==
The Lingen family had long been settled in that county and are recorded in early documents including Domesday Book. The manor of Lingen was settled on Turstan de Lingen and his wife Agnes, heiress and daughter of Alfred of Marlborough, Baron of Ewyas with his extensive Domesday landholding. Turstan's and Agnes's descendants included Isolde de Lingen who married Brian Harley, ancestor or the Harley Earls of Oxford and Dukes of Portland and Queen Elizabeth the Queen Mother. Another descendant and sister of Isolde was Isabella de Lingen, Lady Pembruggue of Tong Castle, founderess of the Chantry Church and buried at Tong, ancestor of the Ludlows of Stokesay Castle, Vernons of Haddon Hall and the Manners, Dukes of Rutland. Another descendant was Sir John Lingen of Lingen d 1506, who fought at the Battle of Mortimer's Cross which elevated Edward IV as king and the family's arms were amended with the three white roses of York. Sir John married Elisabeth de Burgh (d. 1522) who was a co-heiress of Sir John de Burgh and thus descended from the native Welsh Princes of Powys and Llewellyn the Great, Prince of Wales. Elisabeth also shared common descent with the Royal House of Tudor with a grandmother being a sister of Margaret ferch Thomas who married Fychan Tudor and was grandmother of Henry VII, and another of these sisters Ellen ferch Thomas being the mother of Owain Glyndŵr "Prince of Wales". Both Elisabeth and Sir John are buried in Aymestrey church near Lingen with in the chancel. Their descendants included Sir Henry Lingen, Sir Ralph Robert Wheeler Lingen the 1st Baron Lingen of Lingen, the Lingen's of Stoke Edith, Andrew Lingen-Stallard, a former Council member of Royal College of Midwives and the present senior line of the Burton-Lingen's of Longner Hall near Shrewsbury, in which any co rights of the former Principality of Powys now rest.

== Early career ==
He was High Sheriff of Herefordshire in 1638, and made much money from collecting taxes and rent.

== The English Civil War ==
During the Civil War he was again appointed High Sheriff of the county in 1643 and commanded Goodrich Castle, defending it against the Parliamentarians until July 1646 when Colonel John Birch finally broke the defences using the famous cannon Roaring Meg.

His house of Freen's Court at Sutton was besieged until Prince Rupert of the Rhine was called to the rescue. Lingen was knighted by Charles I on his visit to Hereford in 1645. He himself in turn besieged Brampton Bryan Castle, home of his distant kinsman Robert Harley (1579–1656) (quite a common occurrence during the Civil War), the Harley family were later holders of the title Earl of Oxford and Earl Mortimer. This siege was defended by Lady Brilliana Harley but to no avail. He managed to escape from Hereford short before it fell to a surprise attack by Parliamentary forces in December 1645. In 1646 he defended Goodrich Castle but the castle's defences were breached and he was allowed to leave and the castle slighted. He attempted to rally the citizens of Hereford to rebel against the parliamentary forces without success. A portrait of Sir Henry and his wife is in the Old House in Butcher Row in the centre of the city of Hereford.

== Aftermath of war ==
After the Civil War, Sir Henry retired to Stoke Edith "The Fairer House of the Lingens" near Hereford but was fined heavily by Parliament of the sum of six thousand pounds for supporting the former King. Later, his heirs sold Stoke Edith, his principal estate to the Foley family in 1670, it becoming the principal house of Paul Foley, later Speaker of the House of Commons, who rebuilt the house from 1695.

== Marriage ==
Sir Henry married Alice Pye of the Mynnd. (Both were later interred in the Church at Stoke Edith but during remodelling of the Church their monuments were lost). With the Restoration he became a member of parliament for Herefordshire in 1661 but died of smallpox in Gloucester on his way back from a sitting in London in 1662 aged 49.

== Posterity ==
His male heirs died with no issue. Other family lines exist, including heirs of his daughters. Other Lingen lines exist which descend from Sir John Lingen and Elisabeth de Burgh are represented by the Burton-Lingens of Longner Hall in Shropshire who are now the senior branch of the family, Ralph Lingen, 1st Baron Lingen (a title now extinct), Permanent Secretary to the Treasury died 1905 and buried in Brompton Cemetery in London. Also, Andrew Lingen-Stallard (born 1962) MSc, RM, RN FRSA, Consultant Midwife for The London Ambulance Service, elected member of council of the Royal College of Midwives (2003–2007) and former midwifery advisor, Nursing and Midwifery Council (NMC 2006–2008).

== Legacy ==
The Herefordshire folk song Sir Harry's Fancy was based upon his Civil War days and sung by his troops after his surrender of Goodrich Castle.
