= Henry Cornewall (British Army officer, born 1685) =

British Army officer

Lieutenant-General Henry Cornewall (1685 – 4 June 1756) was a British Army officer.

He was the eldest son of Colonel Henry Cornewall of Moccas Court, Herefordshire; Velters Cornewall and James Cornewall were his half-brothers.

After service with the 2nd Troop of Horse Guards, Cornewall was colonel of the 7th Regiment of Marines from 1740 to 1748, Member of Parliament for Hereford from 1747 to 1754, and Governor of Londonderry from 1749 until his death.

He was made Groom of the Bedchamber to King George I in 1714, serving in the royal household until the King's death in 1727.

He died unmarried.

Parliament of Great Britain
Preceded by Edward Cope Hopton; Thomas Geers Winford	Member of Parliament for Hereford; 1747–1754; With: Daniel Leighton	Succeeded by Charles FitzRoy-Scudamore; John Symons
Military offices
Preceded by Phineas Bowles	Governor of Londonderry; 1739–1749	Succeeded by Sir Robert Rich
New regiment	Colonel of the 7th Regiment of Marines; 1740–1748	Regiment disbanded
