= Sir John Buckworth, 1st Baronet =

English merchant and Sheriff of London

Sir John Buckworth, 1st Baronet (18 October 1662 – 1709) of West Sheen, Surrey, was an English merchant, who was Sheriff of London from 1704 to 1705.

Buckworth was baptized at St Olave’s Hart Street London on 28 October 1662, the son of Sir John Buckworth and his second wife Hester, widow of Moses Goodyear. His father was an alderman of London and deputy governor of the Turkey Merchants. Buckworth was described as a person of extraordinary parts who spoke Latin as fluently as English having been well grounded in classical learning. He.became a Freeman of the City of London and of the Worshipful Company of Fishmongers. He married Elizabeth Hall, daughter of John Hall of Yarmouth, Norfolk at Westminster Abbey on 27 October 1687. His travel in Turkey and other places improved his natural and acquired abilities and he returned from abroad a complete gentleman.

Buckworth was knighted at petersham, Surrey, on 2 December 1693 and was created a baronet on 1 April 1697. Although he was never an alderman of the City of London, he was elected as Sheriff of London for the year 1704 to 1705.

Buckworth died at Sheen on 12 June 1709 aged 46, and was buried at St Peter le Poer in London on 24 June. He was succeeded in the baronetcy successively by his two sons John and Everard. His widow remarried to John Hiccocks, Master in Chancery, in 1712. Hiccocks is commemorated by a monument at Inner Temple Lane She died at Sheen on 20 May 1737 and was buried at St Peter le Poer on 27 May.

Baronetage of England
New creation	Baronet (of Sheen); 1697-1709	Succeeded by John Buckworth
