= Stoke Edith =

Village in Herefordshire, England

Coordinates: 52°04′N 2°35′W

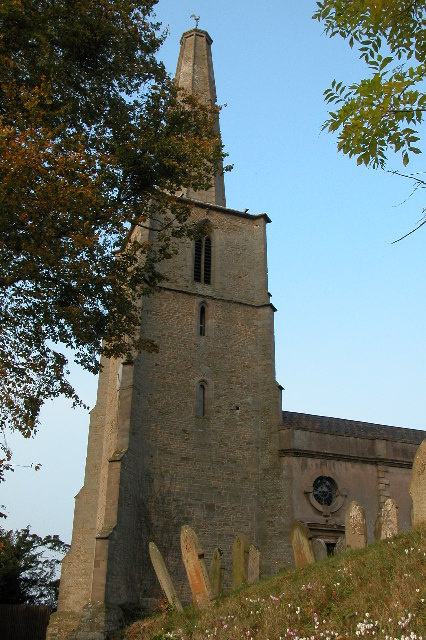
- St Mary's Church, Stoke Edith

- Location within Herefordshire
- Unitary authority: Herefordshire
- Shire county: Herefordshire
- Region: West Midlands
- Country: England
- Sovereign state: United Kingdom
- Post town: Hereford
- Postcode district: HR1
- Police: West Mercia
- Fire: Hereford and Worcester
- Ambulance: West Midlands
- UK Parliament: North Herefordshire

Stoke Edith is a village in the English county of Herefordshire, situated on the A438 road between Hereford and Ledbury. The population in 1801 of Stoke Edith parish was 332.

The 14th-century church of St Mary is a grade I listed building. It has an immaculate needle spire set behind a parapet recess. The Foleys rebuilt the stone church completely in 1740. It has five bay arcades in the nave ended by large Tuscan columns. The church has a communion rail, pews and font in the same period with an impressive wooden pulpit in three decks. There remains an alabaster image of a 15th-century noblewoman with a distinctive headdress. The monument dated 1699 is to Paul Foley, the first to move from Great Witley, co-leader of the Tory Party and Country Whigs. There are tablets to a Henry Wolstenholme and his wife. The church is currently being transferred to a private trust, but is temporarily closed over safety concerns.

== Stoke Edith House ==
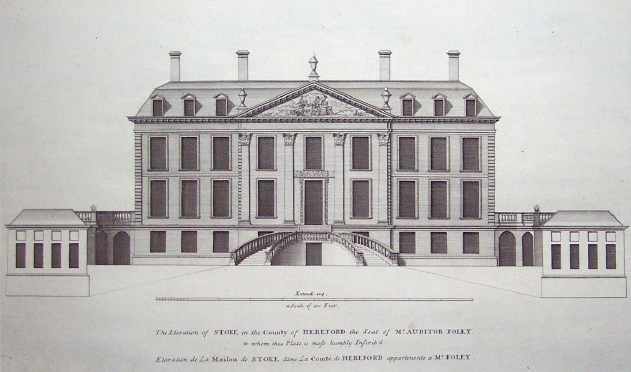
Stoke Edith House - burnt down in 1926 and later demolished.

The estate and the manor house known as Stoke Edith House belonged formerly to the Wallwynes, Milwaters and Lingen families. It was the principal estate of Sir Henry Lingen, a Royalist officer in the English Civil War, who was buried in the church in 1662. His widow sold the estate in 1670 to Thomas Foley, who settled it on his second son Paul. Paul obtained a licence from James II to empark up to 500 acres at Stoke Edith. He rebuilt the timber-framed mansion Stoke Court from 1695, when he became Speaker. The house, renamed Stoke Park, remained in the family until the death of Thomas Lord Foley who, having inherited the Great Witley estate from his distant cousin Thomas 2nd Baron Foley, settled Stoke Edith on his second son Edward Foley (1747–1803). Many of the family were members of Parliament. Stoke Park remained their principal residence until it was burnt down in 1927.

The building currently known as Stoke Edith House was previously the Rectory and this, together with the park and extensive agricultural and woodlands, remain in the ownership of the Foley family.
