= HMS Shrewsbury (1695) =

Ship of the line of the Royal Navy

History

Great Britain
- Name: HMS Shrewsbury
- Builder: Stigant, Portsmouth Dockyard
- Launched: 6 February 1695
- Fate: Broken up, 1749

General characteristics as built
- Class & type: 80-gun third-rate ship of the line
- Tons burthen: 1,257
- Length: 158 ft (48.2 m) (gundeck)
- Beam: 42 ft 6 in (13.0 m)
- Depth of hold: 17 ft 5 in (5.3 m)
- Propulsion: Sails
- Sail plan: Full-rigged ship
- Armament: 80 guns of various weights of shot

General characteristics after 1713 rebuild
- Class & type: 1706 Establishment 80-gun third-rate ship of the line
- Tons burthen: 1,314
- Length: 156 ft (47.5 m) (gundeck)
- Beam: 43 ft 6 in (13.3 m)
- Depth of hold: 17 ft 8 in (5.4 m)
- Propulsion: Sails
- Sail plan: Full-rigged ship
- Armament: 80 guns: Gundeck: 26 × 32 pdrs; Middle gundeck: 26 × 12 pdrs; Upper gundeck: 24 × 6 pdrs; Quarterdeck: 4 × 6 pdrs

HMS Shrewsbury was a three-decker 80-gun third-rate ship of the line of the Royal Navy, built by Joseph Allin the elder and launched at Portsmouth Dockyard on 6 February 1695.

Shrewsbury narrowly escaped destruction on the Goodwin Sands during the Great Storm on 26 November 1703. She was rebuilt according to the 1706 Establishment at Deptford Dockyard, and was relaunched on 12 August 1713.

The Shrewsbury was part of Vice-Admiral Edward Vernon's fleet and took part against the Spanish in the disastrous defeat expedition to Cartagena de Indias during the War of Jenkins' Ear.

Shrewsbury continued in service until 1749, when she was broken up.
