= Herbert Westfaling (politician) =

English politician

Herbert Westfaling (3 January 1630 – 1705) was an English politician who sat in the House of Commons in 1660 and then from 1661 until 1679.

== Early life ==
His great-grandfather Bishop Herbert Westfaling, son of an emigré from Westphalia, was father of Herbert Westfaling (1572–1652), Sheriff of Herefordshire for 1619/20, who married in 1597 Frances Rudhall, eldest daughter and eventual co-heiress of William Rudhall (1552–1609), Sheriff of Herefordshire in 1608, having nine children including an eldest son who predeceased him.

The eldest son of Herbert Westfaling (1599–1638) of Mansell Court, Herefordshire, and Elizabeth Frogmore, daughter of John Frogmore of Claines, Worcestershire, he was educated at Gray's Inn in London.

== Public life ==
In 1660, Westfaling was elected Member of Parliament for Hereford in the Convention Parliament.

In 1661 he fought a highly contentious election for the Cavalier Parliament. Sir Henry Lingen, the constituency's other MP, sought to replace Westfaling with his friend Sir Edward Hopton to gain control of the corporation before the royalist councillors were restored. The Mayor of Hereford admitted 80 of Lingen's supporters as freemen refusing to do likewise for Westfaling. Lingen was returned unopposed, but Westfaling demanded a recount against Hopton. The Mayor was detained in Hereford Guildhall on the first day and refused to go to the poll on the second day, declaring Hopton elected from Hopton's House. Westfaling persuaded the Sheriff to take another return and Hopton topped the poll but with what turned out to be a numerous invalid votes. Hopton was allowed to take his seat but the matter was referred to the elections committee. Sir Job Charlton noted that "there was a very strange carriage and some disturbance in the elections" and recommended Hopton be unseated. However parliament declared the election void, with Lingen and Westfaling being returned at the ensuing Hereford by-election. Westfaling continued to sit as an MP until 1679.

Appointed a Knight of the Royal Oak, Westfaling served as a JP (from 1660) and Deputy Lieutenant for Herefordshire (from 1683), as well as Mayor of Hereford (for 1683/84).

== Family and personal life ==
Seated at Rudhall near Ross-on-Wye, Westfaling inherited the manor and estate from his grandmother's youngest sister, Mary Rudhall, who died unmarried in 1668.

In 1650, Westfaling married Anne Edwardes, only daughter of Sir Thomas Edwardes, 1st Baronet (1599–1660), by his first wife Mary Norton, and died in 1705 at the age of 75, having one son and four daughters.

Their only son, Herbert Rudhall Westfaling (1670–1743), represented Hereford as a Whig MP from 1716 to 1727.
