= Henry Gorges =

English politician

Henry Gorges (c. 1665 – 14 March 1718) was an English politician.

He sat as MP for Herefordshire from 1698 till 1708, Weobley from 13 December 1708 till 1710, and Leominster from 1713 till 1715.

He was born circa. 1665, the only surviving son of Ferdinando Gorges (died 1701), a merchant at St Bartholomew and Meliora, the daughter of William Hilliard. He was educated at St John's College, Oxford and matriculated on 31 March 1683 at the age of 18. He entered Lincoln's Inn in 1683. Before 1696, he married Elizabeth (died 1709), the daughter of Robert Pye and they had two sons and two daughters and 5 other children. He married his second wife, Dorothy and may have had children with her.
