= William Gregory (1625–1696) =

British judge and politician

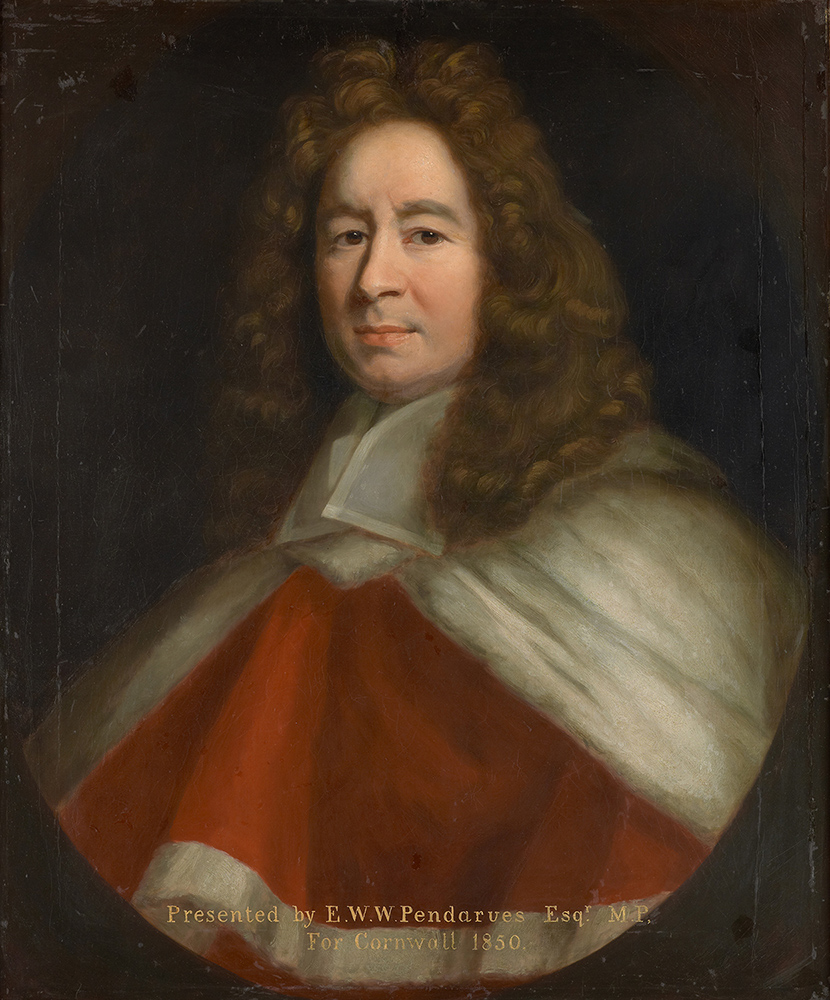
Portrait of Sir William Gregory (1625–1696), Speaker of the House of Commons in the Habeas Corpus Parliament

Sir William Gregory (1 March 1625 – 28 May 1696) was an English judge and politician. Born the son of the vicar of Fownhope, he was educated at Hereford Cathedral School and All Souls College, Oxford and was then called to the Bar from Gray's Inn. In 1653 he married Katharine, only daughter and heiress of James Smith of Tillington, by whom he had an only son, James, who died in 1691 before his father. It was not until 1677 that William gained prominence, being elected a Serjeant-at-law. In March 1677 the election of Sir Thomas Williams as a Member of Parliament for Weobly was called into question and declared void, so William Gregory offered himself as a candidate and was elected without opposition on 9 March.

After only a year in Parliament he was elected to serve as Speaker of the House of Commons in the Habeas Corpus Parliament, as a compromise between Parliament, who wished to reelect Sir Edward Seymour and the King, who was averse to him. During his time in Parliament Gregory was instrumental in the passing of the Habeas Corpus Act 1679, and was subsequently knighted and then confirmed as Baron of the Exchequer. In 1689 he was appointed Chief Justice of the King's Bench, a position he held until his death.

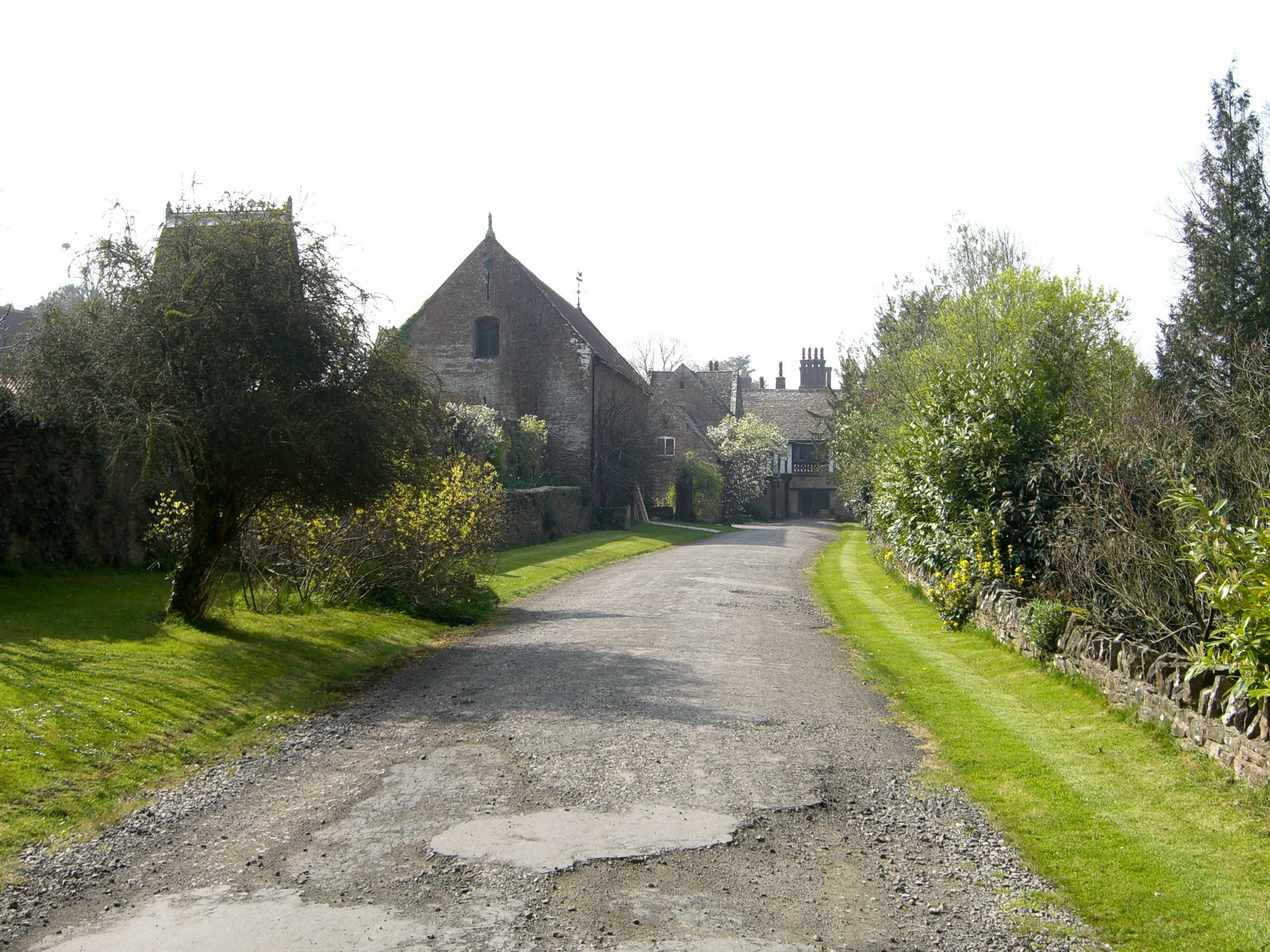
How Caple Court

In 1677 Gregory purchased the manor and estate of How Caple, Herefordshire, from Edward Caple, whose family had held it since 1289, and subsequently added to it with the purchase of lands in Woolhope and Fownhope, including the manors of Fownhope and Sellershope, spending most of his free time at How Caple, where he commenced the building of How Caple Court.

He was afflicted with kidney stones, an illness he bore well: a 1694 letter to Sir Edward Harley says:

My distemper hath been very sharp upon me this winter, and I have not been out of my chamber these three months. My trust is that God, who hath hitheto of his goodness supported me under it, will sanctifie it unto me.

He left adequate funds in his will to rebuild the parish church of St Andrew and St Mary at How Cable (1693–1695), with the exception of the chancel, which remains medieval. The building is apparently admired for its architectural beauty despite being built in a time when architectural design was at its lowest ebb.

A more detailed account of Sir William's political career is available at The History of Parliament Online.

Political offices
Preceded by Sir Edward Seymour	Speaker of the House of Commons; 1679	Succeeded by Sir William Williams
