= Robert Price (judge) =

British judge and politician

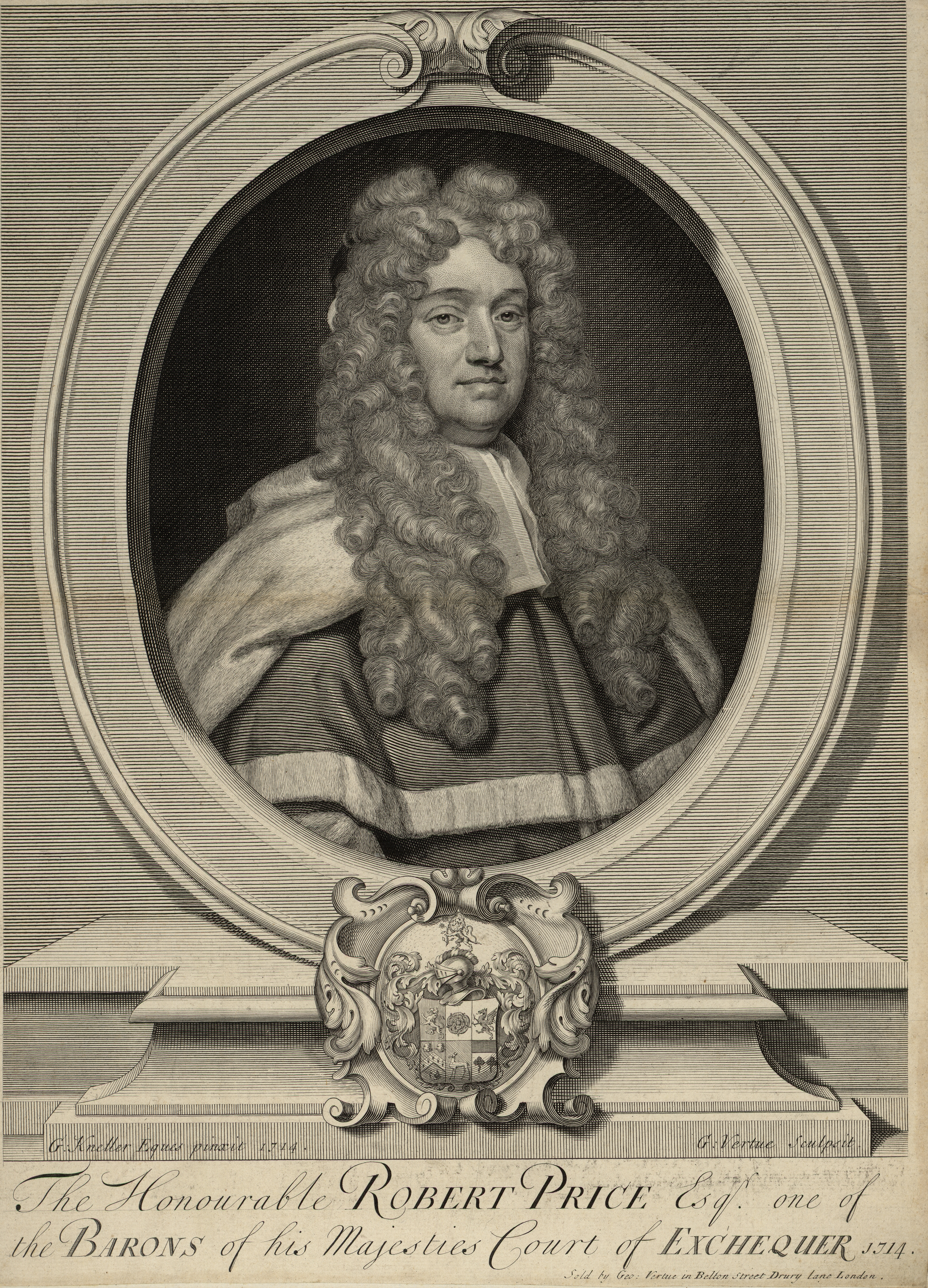
Robert Price.

Robert Price (14 January 1653 – 2 February 1733) was a British judge and politician.

== Early life ==
Robert Price, a Welshman, was born in early 1653 (1654 in the Gregorian calendar), the eldest son of Thomas Price of Giler in Cerrigydrudion, Denbighshire, by Margaret, only child of Thomas Wynn of Bwlch y Beudy in the same parish. He was educated at Ruthin Grammar School and St John's College, Cambridge, after which he entered Lincoln's Inn before making the Grand Tour.

== Career ==
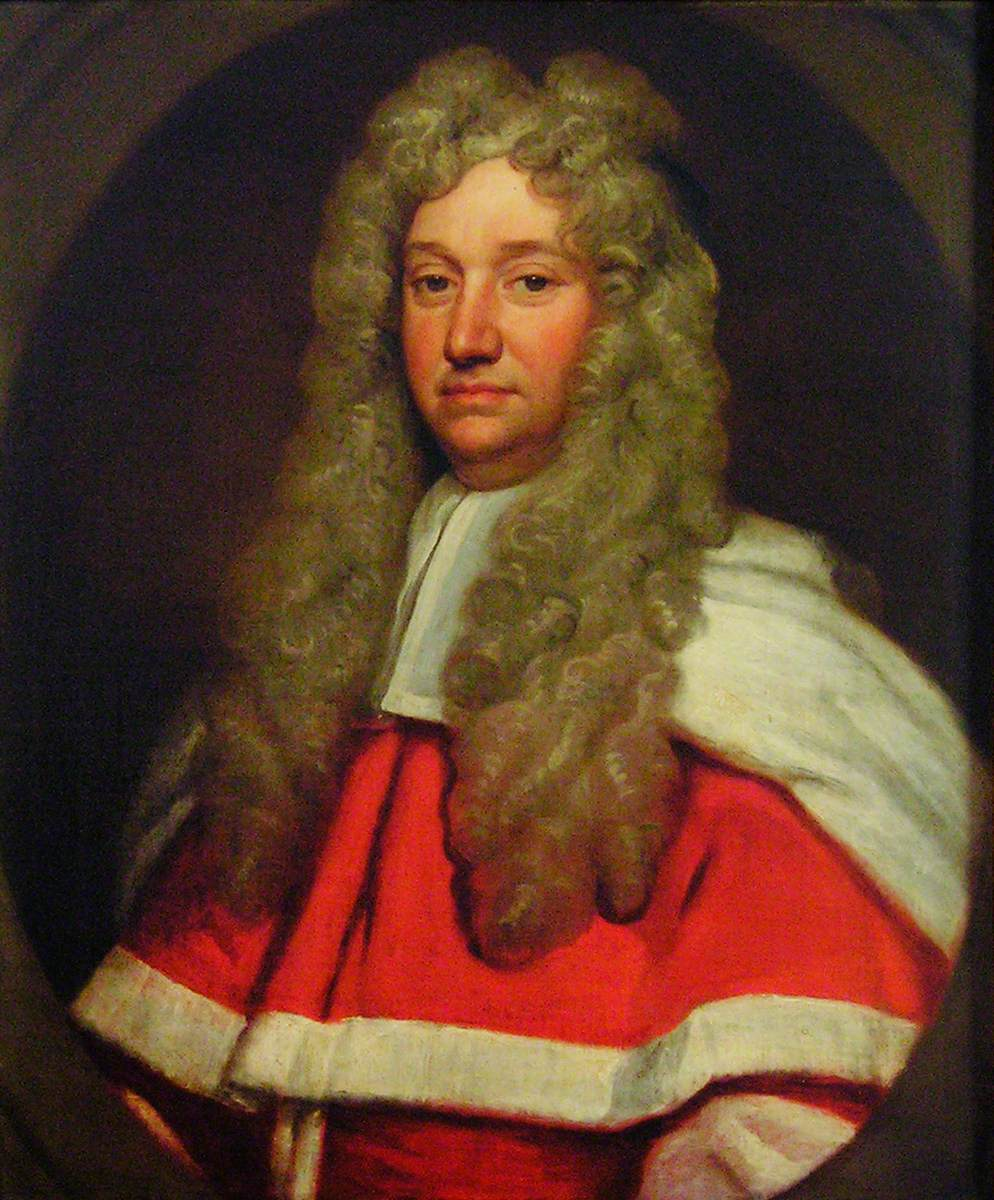
Sir Robert Price by Godfrey Kneller

On 23 September 1679 Price married Lucy, eldest daughter and coheiress of Robert Rodd of Foxley in Yazor, Herefordshire, by Ann Sophia, only child of Thomas Neale of Warneford, Hampshire. Robert Rodd died two years later and Price inherited the Foxley estate. With her he had two sons and a daughter but in 1690, after her adultery with a cousin of hers (whom she bore a child), the couple separated without divorce, Price providing for her and their children throughout his life and in his will.

In 1682 Price was appointed Attorney General for South Wales, as well as alderman of the city of Hereford; the following year he became recorder of Radnor; then steward to Catherine of Braganza in 1684; town clerk of Gloucester 1685; and King's Counsel for Ludlow in 1686.

Price was removed as Attorney General and from other offices in 1688; he later successfully opposed William III's 1695 grant of lands in Denbighshire to William Bentinck, 1st Earl of Portland, earning the appellation "patriot of his native country". He was appointed a judge in Wales in 1700.

Robert Price also served as Member of Parliament for Weobley during this period, resigning the seat in favour of his elder son Thomas in 1702; Queen Anne upon her succession had elevated Price to the bench as a Baron of the Exchequer. In 1726 he became a justice of the Court of Common Pleas.

Price died at Kensington in February 1732 (1733 New Style) and was buried at Yazor. His elder son Thomas, who had resigned his parliamentary seat to make a Grand Tour in Europe, had died at Genoa in 1706 (by differing accounts, murder or suicide), so the younger son Uvedale Tomkins Price succeeded to the family estates in Herefordshire and Denbighshire. There was also a daughter Lucy, who married Bampfylde Rodd of Devon, a distant cousin.
