= High Sheriff of Herefordshire =

Ceremonial officer of the English county of Herefordshire

This is a list of Sheriffs and, since 1998, High Sheriffs of Herefordshire

The position of Sheriff is the oldest secular office under the Crown. Formerly the Sheriff was the principal law enforcement officer in each county, but over the centuries most of the responsibilities associated with the post have been transferred elsewhere or are now defunct, so that the Sheriff's remaining functions are now largely ceremonial. Under the provisions of the Local Government Act 1972, on 1 April 1974 the office previously known as Sheriff was retitled High Sheriff. The High Sheriff changes every March.

Under the same act of 1972, Herefordshire and Worcestershire were merged to form the new county of Hereford and Worcester, and as a result the office of Sheriff of Herefordshire was replaced by that of High Sheriff of Hereford and Worcester. However, in 1998 the new county was dissolved, restoring Herefordshire and Worcestershire and creating the offices of High Sheriff of Herefordshire and High Sheriff of Worcestershire.

The Website of the High Sheriffs' Association of England and Wales stated in 2021 that the role was a "non-political Royal appointment", for one year, and unpaid.

== Sheriffs ==
A nearly complete list of the High Sheriffs of Herefordshire from 1155 to 1647 can be found in The history of the worthies of England, Volume 1, pp. 83–94.

=== 11th century ===
- Ralph de Bernai
- Bryning
- Ilbert fitz Turold
- c.1060 Osborne Fitzrichard Le Scrope

=== 12th century ===
- c. 1127 – Pain fitzJohn
- 1130 (maybe) Adam de Port
- 1129 – 1135: Miles of Gloucester
- 1136 – Pain fitzJohn
- 1155–1160 (2 Henry II) – Walter de Hereford, for five years (son of Miles of Gloucester)
- 1160–1169 (7 Henry II) – William de Bello Campo, for nine years
- 1169 (16 Henry II) – William de Bello Campo and Walter Clicums
- 1170 (17 Henry II) – Willielmus de la Lega
- 1171 (18 Henry II) – Gilbertus Pypard
- 1172 (19 Henry II) – Gilbertus Pypard
- 1173 (20 Henry II) – Willielmus de Braiose
- 1174 (21 Henry II) – Willielmus de Braiose
- 1175 (22 Henry II) – Radulphus Pulcherus, for seven years
- 1182 (29 Henry II) – Milo de Mucegros and Willielmus Torelle
- 1183 (30 Henry II) – Willielmus Torelle
- 1184 (31 Henry II) – Radulphus Arden
- 1185 (32 Henry II) – Radulphus Arden
- 1186 (33 Henry II) – Radulphus Arden
- 1189 (1 Richard I): Radul. de Arden
- 1190 (2 Richard I): Henry de Longo Campo
- 1191 (3 Richard I): Willielmus de Braiosa
- 1192 (4 Richard I): Willielmus de Braiosa
- 1193 (5 Richard I): Henry de Longo Campo) and Willielmus de Braiosa
- 1194 (6 Richard I): Roger. Fitz-Mauricis
- 1195 (7 Richard I): Willielmus de Braiosa
- 1196 (8 Richard I): Willielmus de Braiosa
- 1197 (9 Richard I): Willielmus de Braiosa and Willielmus de Burchhull
- 1198 (10 Richard I): Willielmus de Braiosa and Willielmus de Burchhull
- 1199 (1 John): Walter II de Clifford

=== 13th century ===
- Geoffrey fitz Peter
- 1200 William de Braose, 4th Lord of Bramber and William Burchull
- 1201–1203 Hubert de Burgh and Richard de Signes
- 1204–1205 William de Cantelupe and Walter le Puhier
- 1206–1207 Walter II de Clifford
- 1208–1209 Gérard d'Athée
- 1210–1215 Engelard de Cigogné
- 1215 Hubert de Burgh
- 1216 Walter II de Clifford
- 1217 Thomas de Anesey
- 1218–1220 Walter de Laci and Warrinus de Grindon
- 1221 Walter de Laci and Thomas de Anesey
- 1222 Walter de Laci
- 1223–1225 Randulf and Henry, sons of Nicholas
- 1226–1228 Randulf and Henry, sons of Nicholas and Jo. de East
- 1229–1230 Joan. de Fleg
- 1231 John of Monmouth
- 1232–1233 William son of Warrinus
- 1234 Almeric (or Aymer) de Saint Amand
- 1235–1236 Almeric (or Aymer) de Saint Amand and Richard Fardingston
- 1237–1239 Almeric (or Aymer) de Saint Amand and Mathew de Coddray
- 1240–1246 Almeric de Cancell
- 1247 Waleranus
- 1248 Waleranus de Bradlegh
- 1249 Hugo de Kinardell
- 1250–1251 Henry de Bradlegh
- 1252 Sir John de Grey
- 1252–1253 William de Sto Omero
- 1254–1256 John de Breton, later Bishop of Hereford.
- 1257 Henry de Penbrugge
- 1258 Henry de Penbrugge and Richard de Bagingeden
- 1259–1260 Robert de Meysy
- 1261–1268 Robert de Meysy and Adam de Bideford
- 1264–1265 Walter Devereux of Bodenham and Bromwich
- 1269–1271 Bartholemew de Buly and Adam le Botiller
- 1272–1273 Bartholemew de Stuteley and Adam le Botiller
- 1274 Joan. de Ware
- 1275–1277 Giles de Berkel
- 1278–1289 Roger de Burghall
- 1290–1292 Henry de Solers
- 1293–1298 John of Acton

=== 14th century ===
- 1299–1304: Miles Picard
- 1305: Sir John de Acton
- 1306: Thomas Rossal
- 1307–1310: Walter de Halits
- 1311–1313: Roger Chaundos, 1st Lord Chaundos
- 1314–1315: Richard de Baskervill
- 1316–1317: Hugo Hakluit
- 1318: Roger Picard
- 1320–1324: Roger Chaundos, 1st Lord Chaundos
- 1326: Roger Picard
- 1327–1331: Roger Chaundos, 1st Lord Chaundos
- 1332–1333: John de Rous
- 1334–1335: John Mauger, Robert Chaundos and John le Rous
- 1336–1342: Richard Walwayn
- 1343: John Walwayn
- 1344–1345: William Radour
- 1346: Thomas Pichard
- 1347: John Scholle and Thomas Pichard
- 1348: Richard Dansy and John Scholle
- 1349: Richard Dansy
- 1350: Thomas de Aston
- 1351–1352: Richard de Burges
- 1353: Richard Bregg
- 1354: Richard de la Bere
- 1355: Richard de la Bere and Thomas atte Barre
- 1356–1358: Edward Hakluit
- 1359: Thomas Chaundos, 2nd Lord Chaundos
- 1360–1369:Richard de la Bere
- 1362–1372:William Devereux of Bodenham
- 1370: Thomas Chaundos, 2nd Lord Chaundos
- 1372–1373: Thomas Chaundos, 2nd Lord Chaundos
- 1374–1376: Sir Walter Devereux of Bodenham and Peter de la Mare
- 1376: John Devereux, 1st Baron Devereux
- 1377: Sir Robert Whitney of Whitney-on-Wye and Pencombe
- 1378: Simon de Brugge
- 1379: John Walwayne
- 1380: Hugo Carew
- 1381: Simon de Brugge
- 1382: John Walwayne
- 1382: John Chaundos, 3rd Lord Chandos
- 1383: Roger Pauncefoot
- 1384: Sir Thomas de la Barre of Barre's Court in Holmer and Rotherwas
- 1385: Nicholas Maurdin
- 1386: Thomas Oldcastle of Eyton
- 1387: Kinardus de la Bere of Kinnersley
- 1388: Sir Thomas de la Barre of Barre's Court in Holmer and Rotherwas
- 1389: Thomas Walwayn of Hellions in Much Marcle
- 1390: Hugh de Monington
- 1391: Thomas Oldcastle of Eyton
- 1392: Malcolm de la Mare of Yatton and Little Hereford
- 1393: Thomas Walwayn of Hellions in Much Marcle
- 1394: John Walwayn
- 1395–1396: Sir Thomas de la Barre of Barre's Court in Holmer and Rotherwas
- 1397: Kinardus de la Bere of Kinnersley
- 1397–1398: Thomas Clanvowe of Hengest and Yazor
- 1399: John ap Harry of Poston in Vowchurch

=== 15th century ===
- 1400: William Lucy and Leon. Haklut
- 1401 May–Nov: Sir Walter Devereux of Bodenham and Weobley
- 1401 Nov–Feb: Kinardus de la Bere of Kinnersley
- 1401–1403: John Bodenham
- 1404: John Merbury of Lyonshall and Weobley
- 1405: Sir John Oldcastle
- 1406: vacant
- 1407: John Scudamore of Holm Lacy
- 1408: John Smert
- 1409: Sir John Skydemore of Kentchurch
- 1409: John Bodenham
- 1410: William Walwein
- 1413: Robert Whitney of Whitney-on-Wye
- 1414: John Merbury of Lyonshall and Weobley
- 1415:
- 1416: John Brugge of Staunton-on-Wye
- 1417: John Russell
- 1418: Thomas Holgot
- 1419: John Merbury of Lyonshall and Weobley
- 1420–1421: Richard de la Bere
- 1422: Richard de la Mare
- 1422: John Merbury of Lyonshall and Weobley
- 1423: Rowland Lenthal
- 1424: Guy Whittington of Sollershope
- 1425: John Merbury of Lyonshall and Weobley
- 1425: William de Croft
- 1426: Thomas de la Haye, jnr
- 1427: Robert Whitney of Whitney-on-Wye
- 1428: Richard de la Mare
- 1429: John Merbury of Lyonshall and Weobley
- 1430: Sir John Skydemore of Kentchurch
- 1431: vacant
- 1432: Robert Whitney of Whitney-on-Wye
- 1433: Thomas de la Haye of Arkstone in Kingstone and Urishay in Peterchurch
- 1434: John Merbury of Lyonshall and Weobley
- 1435: Thomas Mille
- 1436: Robert Whitney of Whitney-on-Wye
- 1437: Sir John Pauncefoot of Crickhowell Castle and Hasfield, Glos
- 1438: Walter Skull
- 1439: Richard Walwin
- 1440–1441: Richard Lucy
- 1442: Henry Charleton
- 1443: Thomas Parker
- 1444: Radulph Walwain
- 1445: Thomas Mille
- 1446: Humphrey Stafford
- 1447: Walter Devereux of Weobley
- 1448: Walter Skull
- 1449: John Scudamore
- 1450: John Berry
- 1451: Thomas Parker
- 1452: Thomas Cornwall
- 1453: William Lucy
- 1454: John Barry
- 1455: Walter Skull
- 1456: Walter Scudamore
- 1457: John Scudamore
- 1458: John Seymor
- 1459: William Catesby of Ashby St Ledgers
- 1460: Sir James Baskerville of Erdisley (1st term)
- 1461: John Welford
- 1462–1463: Thomas Monington
- 1464: Simon Melburn
- 1465: Sir John Baskerville of Weston
- 1466: John Lingein
- 1467: Thomas Cornwall
- 1468: Walter Wigmore
- 1469: Sir Walter Baskervill (son of Sir James, HS 1460)
- 1470: Richard Croft
- 1471: Richard Croft
- 1472: John Lingen
- 1473: Thomas Monington
- 1474: James Baskerville (2nd term)
- 1475: Robert Whitney
- 1476: Richard Croft
- 1477: Radulph Hacluit
- 1478: J. Mortimer
- 1479: R. de la Bere
- 1480: Simon Melborn
- 1481: James Baskerville (3rd term)
- 1482: John Mortimer
- 1483: Richard de la Bere
- 1484: Thomas Cornwall
- 1485: Richard Croft
- 1485: John Mortimer
- 1486: John Lingen
- 1487: Roger Bodenham
- 1488: Henry Scudamore
- 1489: John Devereux
- 1490: Thomas Mornington
- 1491: Richard Greenway
- 1492: Richard de la Bere
- 1493: John Mortimer
- 1494: Edward Blunt
- 1495: John Lingen
- 1496: Henry Harper
- 1497: John Lingen
- 1498: Richard Greenway
- 1499: Henry Mile
- 1436: Roger de la Mare

=== 16th century ===
- 1501: Richard Miners
- 1502: John Mortimer
- 1503–1504: Thomas Cornwall (1st term)
- 1505: Edward Croft
- 1506: John Lingen jnr
- 1507: Richard Cornwall of Berrington (1st term)
- 1508: Radulph Hakluit
- 1509: Henry Mile
- 1509: Edward Croft
- 1510: Richard de la Bere
- 1511: Thomas Monington
- 1512: Henry Mile
- 1513: Edward Croft
- 1514: Thomas Cornwall (2nd term)
- 1515: Sir William Herbert of Troy
- 1516: John Lingen
- 1517: Edward Croft
- 1518: Radulf Hakluit
- 1519: Richard Cornwall of Berrington (2nd term)
- 1520: John Lingen
- 1521: Edward Croft
- 1522: Rowland Morton
- 1523: James Baskervill
- 1524: John Scudamore
- 1525: Henry Vain of Kent
- 1526: Sir Richard Cornwall of Berrington (3rd term)
- 1527: Thomas Baskervill
- 1528: John Lingen
- 1529: Edward Croft
- 1530: Richard Vaughan
- 1531: Richard Walwein
- 1532: Thomas Monington
- 1533: Edward Croft
- 1534: Michael Lister
- 1535: William Clinton and Thomas Clinton
- 1536: John Scudamore
- 1537: John Blount of Grendon
- 1538: Sir John Pakington
- 1539: Michael Lister
- 1540: Thomas Monington
- 1541: Richard Vaughan
- 1542: James Baskerville of Erdisley
- 1543: John Scudamore
- 1544: John Lingen of Stoke Edith
- 1545: Stephen ap Harry of Rotherwas and Moorhampton and Rathangan, co. Kildare
- 1546: Roger Bodenham
- 1547: John (?George) Cornwall of Berrington
- 1548: Thomas Baskervill
- 1549: John Harley
- 1550–1551: James Baskerville of Eardisley
- 1552: John Scudamore the elder
- 1553: Sir John Pryce
- 1554: Thomas Howard or Havard
- 1555: John Baskerville of Chanstone Court, Vowchurch and Eardisley
- 1556: Thomas Wynston
- 1557: Richard Monington
- 1558: Richard or Roger Bodenham
- 1559: George Cornwall of Berrington
- 1560: Thomas Blount
- 1561: John Harley
- 1562: John Huband of Leominster
- 1563: George ap Harry
- 1564: James Baskerville of Eardisley
- 1565: John Scudamore of Kentchurch
- 1566: Gregory Price of Hereford
- 1567: William Shelley
- 1568: Thomas Clinton
- 1569: Thomas Baskervill
- 1570: John Baskerville of Chanstone Court, Vowchurch and Eardisley
- 1571: John Huband of Leominster
- 1572: Hugo ap Harry
- 1573: John Abrahal
- 1574: James Whitney
- 1575: Gregory Price of Hereford
- 1576: James Warnecombe of Ivington
- 1577: Thomas Morgan
- 1578: Wa. Baskervill
- 1579: William Cecil
- 1580: Francis Blount
- 1581: John Scudamore of Holme Lacy
- 1582: Thomas Coningsby of Hampton Court and the Black Friars, Hereford.
- 1583: Richard Walwayn
- 1584: Hugh Baskervill
- 1585: Ro. Bodenham
- 1586: James Whitney
- 1587: James Boyle
- 1588: John Berrington
- 1589: Thomas Baskervill
- 1590: Charles Bruges
- 1591: William Rudham
- 1592: Richard Tomkins
- 1593: Ro. Bodenham
- 1594: Thomas Harley
- 1595: Gregory Price of Hereford
- 1596: Eustace Whitney
- 1597: Nicholas Garnons of Moreton-on-Lugg
- 1598: Sir Thomas Coningsby of Hampton Court and the Black Friars, Hereford.
- 1599: William Dauntsey

=== 17th century ===
- 1600: Henry Vaughan
- 1601: Sir James Scudamore of Holme Lacy
- 1602: Richard Hyatt
- 1603–1604: Thomas Harley
- 1605: John Blount
- 1606: John Berington
- 1607: James Tomkins of Monnington on Wye
- 1608: William Rudhal
- 1609: John Kirle
- 1610: Richard Hopton of Rockhill and Cherbury
- 1611: Humphrey Baskerville of Eardisley
- 1612: Humphrey Cornwall
- 1613: Robert Kirle
- 1614: John Colles
- 1615: Francis Smallman of Kinnersley Castle
- 1616: Richard Cox
- 1617: Rowland Skadmore
- 1618: Ambrose Elton, JP, of The Hazle, Ledbury
- 1619: Herbert Weatphaling
- 1620: William Unet
- 1621: Edward Leingein
- 1622: John Bridges
- 1623: Samuel Aubrie
- 1624: James Rodd of Hereford
- 1625: Francis Pember
- 1626: Sir Giles Brydges, 1st Baronet of Wilton Castle, Bridstow
- 1627: Fitzwilliam Coningsby of Hampton Wafer, Docklow and later of Hampton Court
- 1628: William Read
- 1629: John Kirle
- 1630: James Kirle (son of Robert, HS 1613)
- 1631: Walop. Brabazon
- 1632: Roger Dansey
- 1633: Philip Holman
- 1634: John Abrahal
- 1635: William Scudamore
- 1636: John Rudhale of Rudhall, Brampton Abbots (died Mar 1636); Thomas Wigmore
- 1637: Roger Vaughan
- 1638: Henry Lingen of Stoke Edith
- 1639: Robert Whitney
- 1640:
- 1641: Isaac Seward
- 1642: Fitzwilliam Coningsby of Hampton Wafer, Docklow and later of Hampton Court.
- 1643: Henry Lingen of Stoke Edith
- 1643–1646 Civil War
- 1647: Ambrose Elton, Jr., of the Hazle, Ledbury
- 1648: Francis Kirle
- 1649: John Skynner, of Ledbury
- 1650: John James
- 1651: John Patshall
- 1652: Thomas Cook of Stretton
- 1653: Humfrey Shatcrosse of Hatfield
- 1654: William Bridges of Tyberton
- 1655: Richard Hopton
- 1656: Wroth Rogers
- 1658: William Powell of Pengethley, Sellack
- 1659: Francis Pember
- 1661: John Scudamore, Bt
- 1662: Herbert Perrott of Wellington
- 1663: John Handford
- 1664: Thomas Cocks
- 1665: Thomas Unitt
- 12 November 1665: Thomas Rod
- 7 November 1666: John Vaughan
- 6 November 1667: Sir James Brydges, 3rd Baronet, of Sudeley
- 6 November 1668: Gilbert Nicholetts
- 11 November 1669: Humphrey Baskerville
- 4 November 1670: William Dansey, of Brinsop
- 6 November 1671: Marshall Brydges, of Tiberton Court
- 11 November 1672: Richard Whithall
- 12 November 1673: John Scudamore, of Kentchurch
- 5 November 1674: Henry Williams, of Clifford Court
- 15 November 1675: Robert Rodd
- 10 November 1676: William Goodyere
- 22 November 1676: Joseph Hall
- 26 November 1676: Richard Snead
- 15 November 1677: William or John Goodyer
- 14 November 1678: Udall Tomkins
- 13 November 1679: Rowland Bough
- 4 November 1680: John Skippe
- 1682: Sir Thomas Hanbury
- 1683: Sir Herbert Croft, 1st Baronet of Croft Castle
- 1684: John Kerle
- 1685: Anthony Rowden
- 1686: John Booth
- 1687: Herbert Masters
- 1688: Herbert Masters
- 1689: William Mathews replaced by Thomas Cornwall of Stapleton
- 1690: Robert Harley
- 1691: Edward Littleton replaced by Charles Baldwyn of Bockleton, Worcestershire
- 1692: Edward Littleton
- 1693: William Gwillym (the younger) of Langstone Court
- 1694: Anthony Biddulph replaced by Thomas Fletcher of Laughton-Hope
- 1695: Anthony Biddulph
- 1696: John Long
- 1697: Robert Unett replaced by Samuel Birch
- 1698: Humphry Majo
- 1699: William Gregory

=== 18th century ===
- 1700: John Hereford (died 1700)
- 1701: John de la Hay
- 1702: Robert Symonds
- 1703: John Noble
- 1704: William Barnesley
- 1705: Herbert Aubrey of Clehonger
- 1705: Samuel Pytts
- 1706: Markey Abrahall of Ingeston
- 1707: John Skipp
- 1708: Richard Hopper
- 1709: Sir Francis Charlton, 2nd Baronet of Ludford House
- 1710: John Kirwood
- 1711: John Carpenter
- 1712: Brigstock Hartford
- 1713: Robert Weaver
- 1714: Sir Philip Jackson
- 1715: Joseph Clark
- 1716: Thomas Mayo of Hope under Dinmore
- 1717: Thomas Berrington of Brickhouse
- 1718: Henry Jones of Maniston
- 1719: John Dutton Colt
- 1720: George Carver of Upton
- 1721: Edward Witherston
- 1722: Richard Bond of Waldford
- 1723: Thomas Carpenter of Ham
- 1724: Thomas Delahay
- 1725: Thomas James of Murcott
- 1726: Herbert Trist, of Hereford
- 1727: Edward Dyke jnr replaced by William Chin of Walford
- 1728: William Skinner of Stonehouse
- 1729: John Tyler of Dilwyn
- 1730: Thomas Davies of Newhouse
- 1731: John Capell
- 1732: John Cox
- 1733: James Walwyn of Longworth
- 1734: Mansel Powell of Eardisley Park
- 1735: Robert Mynors
- 1736: William Phillips of Newton
- 1737: Richard Gorges
- 1738: Thomas Read
- 1739: Thomas Gwillin of Whitchurch replaced by John Skinner of Bickerton
- 1740: Lutley Barnaby replaced by Bartholomew Richard Barnaby
- 1741: Edmund Eckley
- 1742: John Whitmore of the Haywood
- 1743: James Clark replaced by John Simmonds of the Mynd
- 1744: William Brydges of Tiberton
- 1745: John Pattishall of Piddleston
- 1746: Richard Smyth of Bullingham
- 1747: Bensalem Edwards of Bodenhain
- 1749: John Delahay of Peterchurch
- 1750: Thomas Legge of Willey
- 1751: Thomas Gwillim of Burghill
- 1752: Sir John Morgan, 4th Baronet of Kinnersley Castle
- 1753: Thomas Dunne of Gatley Park
- 1754: Giles Whitehall of Leominster
- 1755: Thomas Penoyre of Clifford
- 1756: Edmund Thomas of Michael Church
- 1757: Robert Mynors Gouge
- 1758: William Cope Gregory
- 1759: Sir James Broome of Withington
- 1760: James Hereford of Mordiford
- 1761: John Brookes-Cotterell of Garnons
- 1762: Howarth Cooke of Holmer
- 1763: George Terry
- 1764: Edward Greenly of Huntington
- 1765: William Vaston of Leominster
- 1766: Harcourt Aubrey of Clehonger
- 1767: John Peploe-Birch, of Garnstone
- 1768: Richard Gorges of Eye, near Leominster
- 1769: William Nourse of Weston-under-Penyard
- 1770: Price Clutton of Kinnersley
- 1771: Sir Chandos Hoskyns, 5th Baronet of Warewood
- 1772: John Skipp of Ledbury
- 1773: Uvedale Price of Foxley
- 1774: John Stratford Collins of Walford
- 1775: John Freeman of Letton
- 1776: James King of Staunton
- 1777: James Clutton of Kinnersley replaced by William Edwards of Sapey replaced by William Matthews of Langarren (died 1777)
- 1778: John Caldecott of Holmer
- 1779: John Salway of Richard's Castle
- 1780: Bell Lloyd of Presteign
- 1781: Edmund Patteshall
- 1782: Francis William Thomas Brydges of Tyberton
- 1783: Tomkyns Dew of Whitney
- 1784: James Walwyn of Longworth
- 1785: Sir Hungerford Hoskyns, 6th Baronet of Morehampton Park
- 1786: Edward Boughton, 8th Baronet of Vowchurch
- 1787: Richard Cope Hopton of Canon Frome
- 1788: Thomas Downes of Staunton
- 1789: Thomas Clutton of Kinnersley replaced by William Taylor of Tillington
- 1790: John Cotterell of Garnons replaced by John Scudamore Lechmere
- 1791: Thomas Stallard Penoyre of The Moor
- 1792: Richard Chambers of Whitbourne
- 1793: John Keysall of Moreton Court
- 1794: John Miles of Ledbury
- 1795: John Moore Greene of Cagebrook
- 1796: Abraham Whittaker of Lyston
- 1797: John Barneby of Brockhampton
- 1798: John Stedman of Bosbury
- 1799: Sir Henry Tempest, 4th Baronet of Caldwell

=== 1800–1899 ===
- 5 February 1800: Thomas Beebee, of Willey
- 11 February 1801: John Skip, of Ledbury
- 3 February 1802: Thomas Debits, of the Apostles died and replaced 17 February 1802 by Edward Bolton Clive, of Treville
- 3 February 1803: Benjamin Biddulph, of Burghill
- 1 February 1804: Richard Stukeley Fleming, of Dinmore Hill
- 6 February 1805: Leonard Parkinson, of Kinnersley
- 1 February 1806: Somerset Davies, of Wigmore
- 4 February 1807: Richard Salwey, of Brimfield Court
- 3 February 1808: Samuel Peploe, of Garnstone
- 6 February 1809: William Wall, of Leominster
- 31 January 1810: Robert Higginson, of Bucknill Park
- 8 February 1811: Philip Jones, of Sugwas
- 24 January 1812: Thomas Jay, of Derndale
- 10 February 1813: Sir Hungerford Hoskyns, 7th Baronet, of Harewood
- 4 February 1814: Edward Moulton Barrett, of Hope End
- 13 February 1815: Edward Thomas Foley, of Stoke Edith House
- 1816: Kingsmill Evans of the Hill
- 1817: Tomkyns Dew of Whitney
- 1818: John Williams of Wilcroft
- 1819: William Bateman-Hanbury, Bt of Shobdon
- 1820: Thomas Perry of Eardisley
- 1821: John Biddulph of Ledbury
- 1822: Thomas Hampton Symons of Mynde Park
- 1823: Edmund B(urnam) Pateshall of Allensmore
- 1824: William Chute Haydon of Moreton Court
- 1825: Thomas Andrew Knight of Downton Castle
- 1826: Francis Henry Thomas of Much Cowarn
- 1827: John Griffiths of the Weir
- 1828: Edmund Higginson of Saltmarsh
- 1829: Richard Blakemore of the Leys replaced by William Gordon, of Haffield
- 1830: Richard Blakemore of the Leys
- 1831: John Arkwright, of Hampton Court
- 1832: John Freeman of Gaines
- 1833: Thomas Dunne of Bircher
- 1834: Sir Samuel Rush Meyrick, of Goodrich Court
- 1835: Richard Webb of Donnington Hall
- 1836: Edward Griffiths, of Newcourt
- 1837: Thomas Monnington, of Sarnesfield
- 1838: Robert Biddulph Phillipps, of Longworth
- 1839: John Higford, of Abbey Dore
- 1840: Thomas Heywood, of Hope End
- 1841: Robert Lane, of Ryelands
- 1842: John Lucy Scudamore, of Kentchurch Park
- 1843: Sir Edwyn Scudamore-Stanhope, 2nd Baronet, of Holme Lacy
- 1844: Thomas George Symons of Mynde Park
- 1845: James King King, of Staunton Park
- 1846: John Francis Vaughan, of Court Hill was initially appointed, but was replaced by Daniel Peploe Peploe, of Garnstone
- 1847: Sir Velters Cornewall, 4th Baronet, of Moccas
- 1848: Robert Maulkin Lingwood, of Lystone House
- 1849: William Barneby, of Clater
- 1850: James Cheese, of Huntington
- 1851: Charles Thomas Bodenham, of Rotherwas
- 1852: William Trevellyan Keville Davies, of Wigmore
- 1853: William Money-Kyrle, of Homme House
- 1854: Elias Chadwick, of Pudlestone Court near Leominster
- 1855: Richard Francis Wegg Prosser, of Belmont near Hereford
- 1856: Charles Williams Allen, of the Moor near Kington
- 1857: Robert Biddulph, of Ledbury
- 1858: Richard Snead Cox, of Pembridge and Eaton Bishop, and of Broxwood near Kington.
- 1859: Richard Yapp, of the Halesend, Cradley, Herefordshire
- 1860: Andrew John Rouse-Boughton-Knight, of Downton Castle
- 1861: Robert Henry Lee Warner, of Tiberton Court
- 1862: John Hungerford Arkwright of Hampton Court near Leominster
- 1863: William Bridgman, of Weston under Penyard
- 1864: Colonel Robert Fielden, of Dulas Court
- 1865: Sir Henry Geers Cotterell of Garnons
- 1866: Sir Edward Cludde Cockburn, of Pennoxtone, 8th Baronet
- 1867: Thomas Reavely, of Einnersley Castle, near Kington
- 1868: Tomkyns Dew, of Whitney Court, near Hereford
- 1869: John Morley, of Moreton Jeffries, near Bromyard
- 1870: Edmund Smalley Hutchinson, of Longworth, near Hereford
- 1871: Stephen Robinson, of Lynhales, near Kington
- 1872: John Habington Barneby Lutley, of Brockhampton
- 1873: James Rankin, of Bryngwyn, Hereford
- 1874: Lieut.-Colonel Thomas Powell Symonds of Pengethley, near Ross
- 1875: Benjamin Haigh Allen, of The Priory, Clifford
- 1876: John Harding, of Tattenhall Lodge, Leamington, and the Lynch, Pembridge
- 1877: John Harward Griffiths, of The Weir, Hereford
- 1878: Edward Bickerton Evans of Whitburne Hall, Bromyard
- 1879: Major-General John Coke of Le More,
- 1880: Benjamin Lawrence Sanders, of Street Court, Leominster
- 1881: Edward Howarth Greenly of Titley Court, Kington
- 1882: Theophilus William Lane of Ryelands, Leominster
- 1883: Robert William Dacre Harley of Brampton Bryan Castle
- 1884: William Henry Barneby of Bredenbury Court, Bromyard
- 1885: Sir Christopher Robert Lighton, 7th Baronet
- 1886: Robert Henry de Winton of Graftonbury, Hereford
- 1887: Henry Higgins of Thinghill, Hereford
- 1888: Charles Archibald Hewitt, of Hope End, Ledbury
- 1889: Richard Green of The Whittern, Kington
- 1890: Colonel Robert Bourne, of Cowarne Court, Ledbury
- 1891: Benjamin St. John Attwood Mathews, of Pontrilas Court, Hereford
- 1892: Harold Charles Moffatt, of Goodrich Court, Ross
- 1893: Hudson Lathom Lutwyche of Kynastone, Ross
- 1894: Thomas Raymond Symons of the Mynde Park, Tram Inn
- 1895: George Cresswell of Ocle Court, Hereford
- 1896: Henry Randolph Trafford of Michaelchurch Court, Hereford
- 1897: Sir John Richard Geers Cotterell, 4th Baronet of Garnons
- 1898: John Riley of Putley Court, Ledbury
- 1899: Arthur Wellesley Foster of Brockhampton Court, Ross

=== 1900–1973 ===
- 1900: John Wood of Ivington, Leominster
- 1901: James Louis Alexander Hope, of Whitney Court, Whitney
- 1902: George William Marshall, of Sarnesfield, Weobley
- 1903: Sir Joseph Verdin, 1st Baronet of Garnstone Castle, Weobley
- 1904: William Theodore Barneby of Saltmarshe Castle, Bromyard
- 1905: Roger Charlton Parr of Staunton Park, Staunton-on-Arrow
- 1906: Paul Henry Foley of Stoke Edith House, Hereford
- 1907: Charles James Paul Gwyer of Eywood, Kington
- 1908: Thomas Davies Burlton of Eaton Hill, Leominster
- 1909: Ralph Tichborne Hinckes of Foxley, Hereford
- 1910: Evans Mynde Allen of Manor House, Upton Bishop, Ross
- 1911: Sir Herbert Archer Croft, 10th Baronet of Lugwardine Court, Hereford
- 1912: Charles Thornton Pulley of Lower Eaton, Hereford
- 1913: Sir Geoffrey Cornewall, 6th Baronet of Moccas Court, Hereford
- 1914: George Ernest Wright of Pudlestone Court, Leominster
- 1915: Lennox Bertram Lee of How Caple Court, Ross
- 1916: James Tuder Hereford of Sufton, Mordiford
- 1917: Colonel John Button Hopton of Canon-ffrome Court
- 1918: Sir Richard Harington Bt.
- 1919: Guy Rawson Trafford of Hill Court, Ross
- 1920: Colonel Gilbert Charles Bourne of Cowarne Court, Ledbury
- 1921: Col. Peter Legh Clowes of Burton Court, Eardisland
- 1922: Edward Marten Dunne of Gatley Park, Kingsland
- 1923: Laurence Nugent Hope of Whitney Court, Whitney
- 1924: Stewart Robinson of The Ovals, Kington
- 1925: Lionel Havercroft Green of The Whittern, Lyonshall, Leominster
- 1926: Charles Andrew Bouse-Boughton-Knight of Downton Castle, Ludlow
- 1927: Major George William Davey of Kinnersley Castle, Eardisley
- 1928: John Ralph Henry Harley, of Brampton Bryan
- 1929: George Basil Heywood of Caradoc Court
- 1930: Charles Anthony Benn of Moor Court, Kington
- 1931: Henry Evan Pateshall Pateshall of Allensmore Court, Hereford
- 1932: Herbert Ronald Pettit of Castle Weir, Kington
- 1933: Charles Jerome Vaughan of Courtfields, Ross
- 1934: Edward Frederick Bulmer of " Adam's Hill", Breinton, Hereford
- 1935: Herbert Riches Jenkins, of The Porch House, Westhide, Hereford
- 1936: George Malcolm Kent of Garden House, Shobdon, Leominster
- 1937: The Reverend William Marshall of Sarnesfield Court, Weobley
- 1938: Robert Holme Storey of Bishopswood, Ross-on-Wye
- 1939: Sir George Sidney Clive of Perrystone Court, How Caple
- 1940: Henry Howard Bulmer of Longmeadow, Hereford
- 1941: Eric Carnegie Romilly of Broadfield Court, Bodenham, Hereford
- 1942: Thomas Henry Foster of The Grange, Whitchurch
- 1943: Owen George Scudamore Croft of Hephill, Lugwardine, Herefordshire.
- 1944: Richard Saher de Quincey Quincey of The Vern, Bodenham.
- 1945: Frederick Parland Loder-Symonds of Waldrist, Aylestone Hill, Hereford.
- 1946: Cecil John Herbert Spence Colby of Donnington Hall, Ledbury.
- 1947: Henry Thomas Hamilton Foley of Stoke Edith Park, Herefordshire.
- 1948: Edward Francis Herbert Evans of Whitbourne Hall, Herefordshire.
- 1949: John Lewes Davenport, Yarsop House, Mansel Lacey
- 1950: Gerard Leigh Clay, Brockhampton Cottage
- 1951: John Francis Maclean, Thatch Close, Llangrove, Ross
- 1952: Thomas Philip Barneby, Salt Marsh Castle, Bromyard
- 1953: Thomas Reginald Fraser Bate, Glenmonnow House, Garway
- 1954: Felix Alexander Vincent Copland-Griffiths, Bircher Hall, Leominster
- 1955: Sir Frederick Burrows, Thrushes Nest, Ross on Wye
- 1956: Henry Maysey Barneby, Brockington House, Bredenbury
- 1957: Herbert Roy Rowlands, Brand Lodge, Colwell
- 1958: Robert Peel Waller of Wyastone Leys, Monmouth
- 1959: John Arthur Hill of Orleton Manor, Near Ludlow
- 1960: Thomas John Hawkins of Wilton Oaks, Tarrington
- 1961: David Watkin Hamlen Williams, Angel House, Kingsland
- 1962: Ronald Edmund Combe of The Slad, Putley, Hereford
- 1963: Richard Frederic Neill Aldrich-Blake, Weston Hall, Ross-on-Wye
- 1964: Edward Somers Fleming Evans of Whitbourne Hall
- 1965: Charles Edward Rudge of Baysham, Ross-on-Wye
- 1966: Philip George Verdin of The Butt House, Canon Pyon
- 1967: Robert Alfred Lowth of Ross-on-Wye
- 1968: Rowland Kirle Cecil Pope of Homme House, Much Marcle
- 1969: Miles Aubrey Belville of Bromyard
- 1970: Thomas Raymond Dunne, Gatley Park, Leinthall Earls, Leominster
- 1971: Neston Dana Ord Capper of Ullingswick
- 1972: Henry Habington Barneby of Llanerch-y-Coed, Dorstone
- 1973: Ernle Reginald Forester Gilbert of Bishopstone, near Hereford

== High Sheriff ==
- 1974–1997 – See High Sheriff of Hereford and Worcester

=== 1998–present ===
- 1998: Simon William Britten Dereham, Sapness Farm, Woolhope
- 1999: Rosalie Joan Dawes, Birtsmorton Court, near Malvern, Worcestershire
- 2000: Thomas Hone, of Bosbury House
- 2001: Andrew William Dyson Perrins, of The Hyde
- 2002: Col Sir Piers Henry George Bengough of Great House
- 2003: Georgina Sarah Henrietta Britten-Long, of Hill Farm
- 2004: James Donald Nicholas, of Welsh Court
- 2005: Andrew William Grant
- 2006: Lt-Gen Sir John Paul Foley
- 2007: John Sarne Yorke
- 2008: Lt-Col Michael Robin Ogilvie Leigh
- 2009: Gilbert Greenall
- 2010: Elizabeth Jean Hunter of Ledbury
- 2011: Simon David Arbuthnott of Leominster
- 2012: Lieut.-Colonel Charles J. G. Thwaites of Pixley House, Pixley, Ledbury
- 2013: Robert S. D. Tabor of Llanrothal, Monmouth
- 2014: Major Patrick J. A. Darling of Caradoc, Sellack, Ross on Wye
- 2015: Edward Mortimer Harley of Brampton Bryan Hall, Bucknell
- 2016: William James (Bill) Jackson of Hereford
- 2017: Reverend Lady Lisvane of Blakemere
- 2018: Thomas Nathaniel Hone of Bosbury House, Bosbury
- 2019: James Felton Somers Hervey-Bathurst of Ledbury
- 2020: Patricia Claire Hodsoll Thomas of Bromyard
- 2021: Joanna Phyllis Hilditch of Lyonshall, Kington
- 2022: Sarah Louise de Rohan of Birley, Hereford
- 2023: Robert Charles Christian Robinson of Little Hereford, Ludlow
- 2024: Patricia Beatrice Churchward of Hereford
- 2025: Helen Clare Bowden, Hereford
- 2026: Tamsin Sczerina Clive, Hereford
