= Walter Pye =

Walter Pye may refer to:

- Walter Pye (lawyer) (1571–1635), English barrister, courtier, administrator and politician
- Walter Pye (Royalist) (1610–1659), his son, English politician and Royalist
