= John Baskerville (disambiguation) =

John Baskerville (1707–1775) was an English businessman.

John Baskerville may also refer to:

- John David Baskerville (1857–1926), Canadian politician
- John Baskerville (MP for Herefordshire) (died 1577), English politician
