= High Sheriff of Hereford and Worcester =

Ceremonial officer of Hereford and Worcester, England

The office of High Sheriff of Hereford and Worcester came into existence with the county of Hereford and Worcester on 1 April 1974 under the provisions of the Local Government Act 1972. The office subsumed that of the much older offices of Sheriff of Herefordshire and Sheriff of Worcestershire. The office was abolished in 1998 and the functions of the High Sheriff of Hereford and Worcester returned to the offices of the Sheriff of Herefordshire and Sheriff of Worcestershire, both of which were renamed High Sheriff. During its existence the office of High Sheriff of Hereford and Worcester remained the sovereign's representative in the county for all matters relating to the judiciary and the maintenance of law and order. The High Sheriff changed every March.

== Officeholders ==
- 1974: Colonel George Michael Singleton, of Tustins, Colwall, near Malvern
- 1975: George Howard Heaton, of The Tee, Martley, near Worcester
- 1976: David Vernon Swynfen Cottrell, of Rectory Farm Cottage, Kemerton, Tewkesbury
- 1977: Lieut-Colonel Edward Courtenay Phillips, of Chase House, Monnington-on-Wye, near Hereford.
- 1978: John Sydney Birch Lea, of Dunley Hall, Stourport-on-Severn
- 1979: Bernard Arthur Higgins, of The Halesend, Storridge, near Malvern.
- 1980: Colonel Thomas Jim Bowen, of Little Blakes, Shelsley Beauchamp
- 1981: Richard Chevallier Green, of The Whittern, Lyonshall, Kington.
- 1982: Lieut-Cdr. John Alan Bennet Thomson, of Bransford Manor, Worcester.
- 1983: Keith Robert Henshaw James of Broadfield Court, Bodenham.
- 1984: Lieut-Colonel Patrick Charles Britten of Wichenford Court, near Worcester.
- 1985: Captain Charles Patrick Hazlehurst, of Broomy Court, Llandmabo, Hereford.
- 1986: William Richard Broughton Webb, of Barbers, Martley, Worcester
- 1987: Christopher Charles Harley of Brampton Bryan Hall, Bucknell, Shropshire.
- 1988: Thomas Monsanto Berington, of Little Malvern Court, Malvern.
- 1989: Major David John Cecil Davenport, of Mansel House, Mansel Lacy, Hereford.
- 1990: Michael Ashley Cecil Brinton, of Park Hall, Kidderminster.
- 1991: David Edward Bulmer, of Brilley Court, Brilley, Whitney-on-Wye.
- 1992: Vanda Alexandra Clare, Lady Cotterell, of Garnons, Hereford.
- 1993: Stephen John Anthony Webb, of The Bean House, Cradley, near Malvern.
- 1994: George Meysey Clive of Whitfield, Allensmore, Hereford.
- 1995: Hugh Bernard Derbyshire, of The Eades, Upton-upon-Severn.
- 1996: Rosemary Sally Clive, of Perrystone Court, Ross-on-Wye.
- 1997: Michael Eliot Howard, of Green Farm, Sankyn's Green, Little Witley.

For 1998 onwards, see High Sheriff of Herefordshire and High Sheriff of Worcestershire
