= Alexander Pearson =

Alexander Pearson may refer to:

- Alexander William Pearson (born 1854), rugby union international who represented England
- Alexander Pearson (cricketer) (1856–1931), Scottish first-class cricketer and legal advocate
- Alex Pearson (1877–1966), Major League Baseball pitcher
- Alexander Pearson Jr. (1895–1924), aviation figure in the Army Air Service
