= Clanvowe =

Clanvowe is a surname. Notable people with the surname include:

- John Clanvowe (c.1341–1391), Welsh diplomat, soldier, and poet
- Thomas Clanvowe (died 1410), British landowner, politician, and sheriff
