= Benjamin Mason (MP) =

English politician

Benjamin Mason was an English politician. He was a member of the Parliament of England for Herefordshire in 1656.
