= Robert Pearson (stockbroker) =

Scottish cricketer, lawyer, stockbroker

Personal information
- Full name: Robert Barclay Pearson
- Born: 20 November 1871; Laurencekirk, Kincardineshire, Scotland
- Died: 12 February 1954 (aged 82); Marylebone, London, England
- Batting: Right-handed
- Bowling: Right-arm slow
- Relatives: Alexander Pearson (brother); Henry Foley (son-in-law)

Domestic team information
- Years: Team
- 1894: Oxford University

Career statistics
Competition	First-class
Matches	1
Runs scored	48
Batting average	24.00
100s/50s	–/–
Top score	44
Balls bowled	105
Wickets	0
Bowling average	–
5 wickets in innings	–
10 wickets in match	–
Best bowling	–
Catches/stumpings	–/–
- Source: Cricinfo, 4 July 2020

Sir Robert Barclay Pearson (20 November 1871 – 12 February 1954) was a Scottish first-class cricketer, lawyer and stockbroker.

The son of Andrew Pearson, he was born in November 1871 at Laurencekirk, Kincardineshire. He was educated at Loretto School, before going up to Brasenose College, Oxford. While studying at Oxford, he made a single appearance in first-class cricket for Oxford University against Essex at Leyton in 1894. Batting twice in the match, Pearson was dismissed for 44 runs in the Oxford first innings by Charles Kortright, while in their second innings he was dismissed for 4 runs by the same bowler. He also bowled 21 wicketless overs across the match, conceding 35 runs. A talented sportsman, Pearson also played golf for Oxford in the 1892 and 1894 University Golf Match, in addition to playing rugby union for Oxford University RFC. He was a member of the Brasenose College Boat Club, rowing twice for them in the Head of the River contest.

After graduating from Oxford, Pearson became a lawyer and was called to the Faculty of Advocates in Scotland in 1891. He later changed profession to become a stockbroker, which he did for 34 years. He was from 1938 to 1947 the chairman of the London Stock Exchange and was knighted in the 1944 New Year Honours. Pearson died at Marylebone in February 1954. Both his brother, Alexander, and son-in-law, Henry Foley, played first-class cricket.
