= Sarnesfield =

Village in Herefordshire, England

Coordinates: 52°09′N 2°55′W

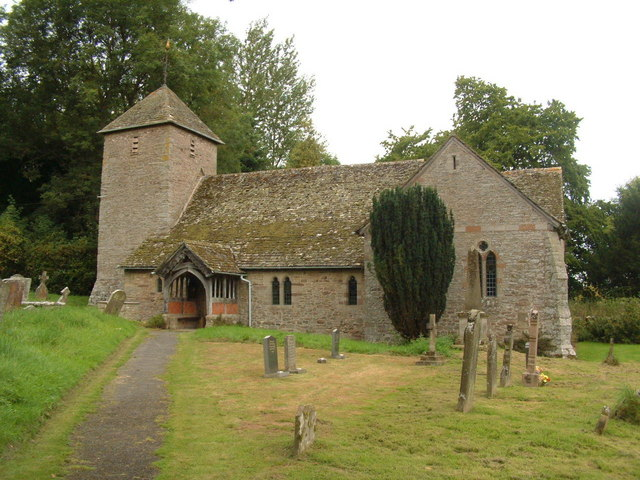
- St Mary's Church, Sarnesfield

- Location within Herefordshire
- Unitary authority: Herefordshire
- Shire county: Herefordshire
- Region: West Midlands
- Country: England
- Sovereign state: United Kingdom
- Post town: Hereford
- Postcode district: HR4
- Police: West Mercia
- Fire: Hereford and Worcester
- Ambulance: West Midlands
- UK Parliament: North Herefordshire

Sarnesfield (National Grid ref. SO374508) is a civil parish and village in Herefordshire, eleven miles north-west of Hereford.

== Descent of the manor ==
=== De Lacy ===
Sarnesfield was granted by William the Conqueror to Roger de Lacy.

=== De Sarnesfield ===
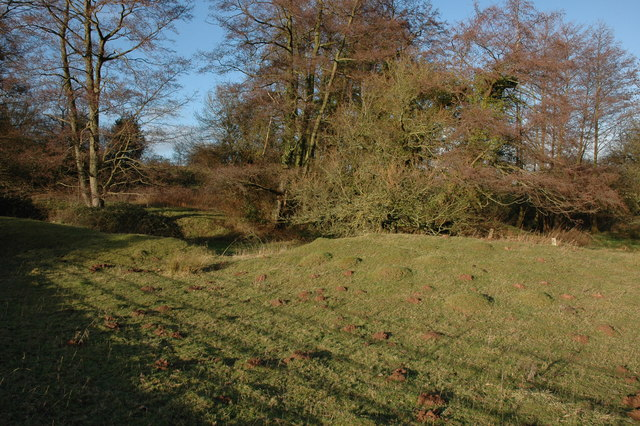
Remains of a moat at Little Sarnesfield

Philip de Sarnesfield held one and a half hides from Hugh de Lacy in 1109. An early lord of the manor was Nicholas de Sarnesfield, a member of the retinue of the Black Prince and created a Knight of the Garter in 1386 by King Richard II to whom he was standard bearer and an eminent diplomat. He died in 1394, leaving his two daughters co-heiresses, the eldest of whom married Hugh de Moynton or Monington. The younger daughter married Walter Bromwich of Sarnesfield Coffyn, now Little Sarnesfield Farm. The manor was split into two moieties, with Greater Sarnesfield passing to the Monington family, and Sarnesfield Coffyn (also known as Little Sarnesfield) to Bromwich. The latter was held by John Bromwich in 1532. Subsequently the two moieties seem to have been re-united into one manor. Sarnesfield was held by the Monington family until 1781.

=== Monington ===
Portrait of John Webbe-Weston (d.1823), pastel by John Russell

In St Mary's Church is the following marble wall tablet:

"Sacred to the Memory of ANN TERESA MONINGTON. She was born the 21st Novr 1735, at SARNESFIELD COURT the Seat of her Ancestors where She resided many Years in the exercise of every social vertue, and in hospitality to her neighbours and benevolence to the Poor, surpassed by none. On the 2nd Febry 1780, She took the Veil in the FRANCISCAN CONVENT of English Ladies at BRUGES in FLANDERS - driven from thence by the French Revolution in 1794, with them retired to the Abbey-house in WINCHESTER where She died on the 24th Novr following, and her Remains are deposited Through Life revered in Death regretted. On her embracing a Religious State She renounced all her Worldly possessions, and generously gave up her Estates in this County,

to her Kinsman, JOHN WEBB WESTON, Esqr who in grateful remembrance, has caused this Tablet to be erected, R.I.P."

John Webbe-Weston was the heir of Sutton Place, Surrey. In 1837 Thomas Monington of Sarnesfield was High Sheriff of Herefordshire.

=== Marshall ===
In 1891 Sarnesfield Court was bought by George William Marshall (1839–1905), York Herald, who did much to restore the church to its original condition, removing later additions. He was buried in the parish on 16 Sept. 1905.

== St Mary's Church ==
Fragments of 13th- or 14th-century floriated crosses are visible in the church. One apparently from the 14th century in the south-east corner of the south chapel commemorates Isabel De Sarnesfield.

== Sarnesfield Court ==
Sarnesfield Court was demolished in 1955.

== Sources ==
- www.genuki.org.uk
