= John Russell (speaker) =

English politician (died 1437)

John Russell (died 1437) was an English landowner and Justice of the Peace who was elected Speaker of the House of Commons of England in 1423 and 1432.

Russell sat in the Parliaments of 1410, 1411 and 1417 as a proxy for the Abbot of Gloucester; and also in later parliaments between 1414 and 1433 having been elected to the House of Commons as knight of the shire for Herefordshire in his own right. He was appointed High Sheriff of Herefordshire in 1417. He made an unsuccessful attempt to become speaker in 1420 losing to Roger Hunt, but was elected to the role in 1423.

Russell gave the speech of welcome at the infant Henry VI's first appearance before the assembled House of Commons and House of Lords on 17 November 1423.

He was again elected as Speaker in 1432.

Political offices
Preceded by Roger Flower	Speaker of the House of Commons; 1423–1424	Succeeded by Thomas Walton
Preceded by Sir John Tyrell	Speaker of the House of Commons; 1432	Succeeded by Roger Hunt
