= Richard Cornwall (died 1533) =

English politician

Sir Richard Cornwall (by 1480–1533) of Berrington, Herefordshire, was an English courtier and politician.

He was the son of Sir Thomas Cornwall of Berrington, who he succeeded in 1501.

He was made one of King's spears by 1510 and an Esquire of the Body by 1513. He accompanied Henry VIII to Calais in 1513 and was present at the meeting with Francis I of France at the Field of the Cloth of Gold in 1520 and the subsequent meeting with Charles V, Holy Roman Emperor at Gravelines. He was knighted in 1522 after the capture of Morlaix.

He was pricked High Sheriff of Herefordshire for 1507–08, 1519–20 and 1526–27 and was a Member (MP) of the Parliament of England for Herefordshire in 1523 and 1529.

He died in 1533, having married by 1509, Jane, the daughter and coheiress of Simon Milborne of Tillington, Herefordshire and Icomb, Gloucestershire and had 1 son and 1 daughter. He was succeeded by his son George.
