= Stoke Edith Wall Hanging =

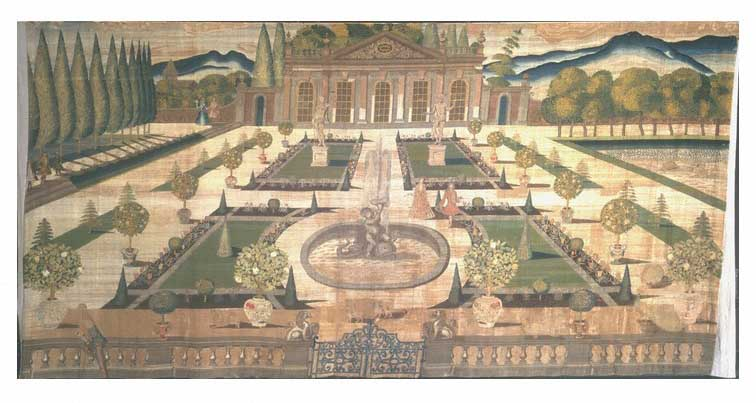
Stoke Edith Wall Hanging, 1710-1720 V&A Museum no. T.568-1996

The Stoke Edith Wall Hanging is an embroidered wall hanging made in 1710–20, depicting elegant people walking in an early 18th-century garden. This is the larger of two such works which originally hung in Stoke Edith in Herefordshire.

The Stoke Edith House was built in 1697 for Paul Foley, Speaker of the House of Commons, and finished by his son Thomas, an MP and wealthy landowner. After a visit by the leading garden designer George London in 1692 the park and gardens were remodelled to his suggestion, and it is likely that pleasure grounds would have been laid out around the house in a series of formal compartments with geometric walks, flower-beds and fountains. The house was destroyed by fire in 1927. Prior to this the hangings hung in the green velvet bedroom, between the dado and the ceiling. After the fire they were kept by the Foley family in London.

The hanging shows couples strolling, the long shadows suggesting a late afternoon in summer. A gentleman doffs his hat while his lady holds out her closed fan, the lappets of her headdress rippling in the breeze. A spaniel chases a squirrel up a tree, peacocks strut around and swans glide on the lake. Orange trees in Chinese pots and laden fruit trees contribute to the graceful affluence of the scene. Embroidered hangings such as this were used like woven tapestries, lining the walls of a room with decorative, narrative scenes, and bringing the country or garden inside the house. Despite their large scale they manage to convey a sense of intimacy in their celebration of private family pleasures.

The hangings are worked mainly in tent stitch in silk and wool on a linen canvas ground, there are some areas of applique with chain stitch. The design was drawn on the canvas prior to embroidery, this can be seen in some areas where the stitches have dropped out. From this evidence it appears that some small areas of the design were not executed, or were worked differently from the original design.

== Bibliography ==
- Jackson, Anna, ed. (2001). V&A: A Hundred Highlights. V&A Publications.
