= Thomas Clanvowe =

Member of the Parliament of England

Arms of Clanvowe: Paly of six or and azure, on a fess gules three mullets or

Sir Thomas Clanvowe (died 1410) was an English landowner, Member of Parliament and Sheriff of Herefordshire. Clanvowe was probably the son of Sir John Clanvowe (died 1391) of Hergest, Herefordshire. The surname is an Anglicised Welsh name, presumably Llanfawr.

== Career ==
In 1391 he entered the service of King Richard II as one of the Kings' esquires. In 1392 he married Perryne, the daughter of Sir Robert Whitney of Whitney-on-Wye, Herefordshire and one of Queen Anne's ladies-in-waiting. They had no children. He was knighted in 1394/5 after taking part in a military expedition to Ireland and in 1400 took part in an invasion of Scotland under Richard, Lord Grey of Codnor.

He was elected Knight of the Shire (MP) for Herefordshire in 1394 and January and September 1397. He was a justice of the peace (JP) for Herefordshire from 1397 to 1399 and appointed Sheriff of Herefordshire for 1397–1399. In 1401 he accompanied Queen Isabella back to France after the overthrow of Richard II. In 1402 he accompanied Sir Edmund Mortimer on his campaign against the rebel Welsh leader, Owain Glyndŵr, but the English were defeated at the Battle of Bryn Glas near Knighton, Radnorshire, and Clanvowe captured (but later released).

He was a member of a group known as the Lollard knights after their heretical (Lollard) beliefs.

== Death and succession ==
He died without surviving progeny, when his heir became his aunt Elizabeth Clanvowe, the wife of John Poyntz (died 1366) lord of the manor of Iron Acton in Gloucestershire.

Parliament of England
Preceded by Sir John Chandos; Thomas Oldcastle	Member of Parliament for Herefordshire; 1394; With: Sir Leonard Hakluyt	Succeeded by Sir John Chandos; Thomas Walwyn I
Preceded by Sir John Chandos; Thomas Walwyn I	Member of Parliament for Herefordshire; 1397; With: Thomas Walwyn II (Jan.); John Skydemore (Sept.)	Succeeded by Sir Kynard de la Bere; Thomas Walwyn II
Political offices
Preceded by Kynard de la Bere	Sheriff of Herefordshire; 1397–1399	Succeeded by John ap Harry
