= Sir Giles Brydges, 1st Baronet =

English politician

Sir Giles Brydges, 1st Baronet (1573 – August 1637) was an English politician who sat in the House of Commons at various times between 1621 and 1629.

Brydges was the son of the Hon. Charles Brydges of Wilton Castle, Ross-on-Wye, Herefordshire, younger son of John Brydges, 1st Baron Chandos, and his wife Jane, daughter of Sir Edward Carne. He matriculated at St Alban Hall, Oxford on 27 Nov 1590 aged 17. He was created a baronet on 17 May 1627.

In 1621, Brydges was elected Member of Parliament for Tewkesbury. In 1625 he was High Sheriff of Herefordshire. He was elected MP for Herefordshire in 1625 and 1628, and sat until 1629 when King Charles decided to rule without parliament for eleven years.

On 16 January 1620 Brydges married Mary Scudamore, daughter of Sir James Scudamore MP of Holme Lacy, Hereford. His grandson, James, succeeded as the 8th Baron Chandos in 1676.

Parliament of England
| Preceded by Sir John Ratcliffe; Sir Dudley Digges | Member of Parliament for Tewkesbury; 1621–1622; With: Sir Dudley Digges | Succeeded by Sir Dudley Digges; Sir Baptist Hicks |
| Preceded by Sir Robert Harley; Sir John Scudamore, Bt | Member of Parliament for Herefordshire; 1625; With: John Rudhale | Succeeded by Sir Robert Harley; Sir Walter Pye |
| Preceded by Sir Robert Harley; Sir Walter Pye | Member of Parliament for Herefordshire; 1628–1629; With: Sir Walter Pye | Parliament suspended until 1640 |
Baronetage of England
| New creation | Baronet (of Wilton); 1627–1637 | Succeeded by John Brydges |
