= Hill Court Manor =

Country house in Walford, Herefordshire, England

Coordinates: 51.89131°N 2.62043°W

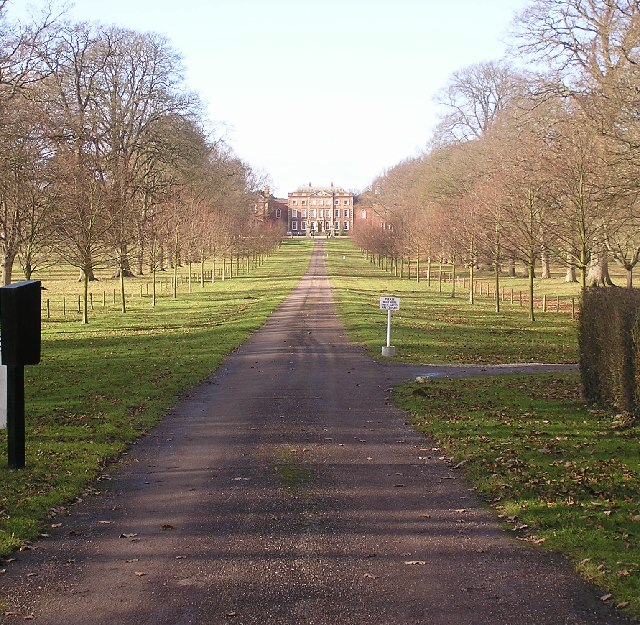

Hill Court Manor (grid reference SO574216) is a country house built in 1700 at Hom Green, Walford near Ross-on-Wye in Herefordshire. The house is a Grade I listed building. It is currently owned and occupied by the Rehau Group.

== A Short History ==
Although Hill Court has only been owned by four families since its construction nearly three hundred years ago, each family has been instrumental in the development of different aspects of this fine country estate from the structure of the building to the lay out of the gardens and the management of the land.

In 1698 the building of Hill Court was initiated by Richard Clarke, the son of a country gentleman, whose family, it is believed, made their fortune importing clover seed to England in the seventeenth century. Work on Hill Court progressed, but Richard died in 1702 before his house was finished and the task of completing the building was passed on to his brother Joseph.

There were not many surviving accounts from the building but records show that on 21 September 1700 the sum of £71 12s 9d was paid to Robert Wayman for all the brickwork in the house walls and drains.

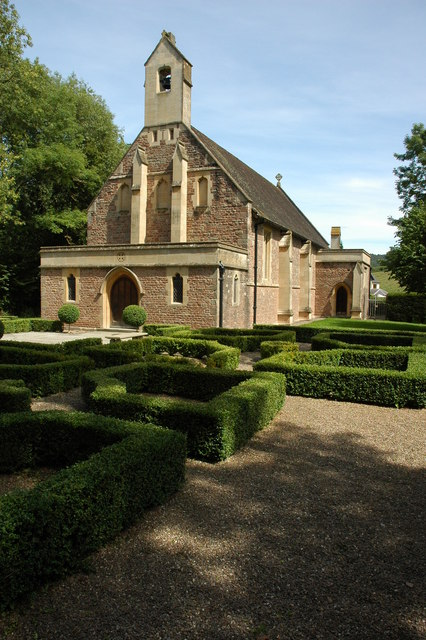
Church of the Paraclete

When Joseph Clarke finished building Hill Court in 1708 it was a rectangular, two storey house with a large hipped roof. Looking at the house today it is possible to see the darker bricks of the original building finishing in a line just above the first floor windows of the central block. Joseph lived in his new country house with his wife and eight children and he was sufficiently established in the county to become Sheriff of Herefordshire in 1715.

In the 1700s the impressive avenue in the front of the house was planted with elm trees by John Kyrle, a friend of Joseph Clarke. Kyrle was a local gentleman and benefactor to the town of Ross. It is documented that he rebuilt the church spire and laid out the Prospect, a public garden in the town. The stone work at Hill Court bears resemblance to that in the Prospect gardens and this suggests that there may be some truth in the tradition that he designed Hill Court.

Joseph Clarke died in 1728 and was succeeded by his eldest son Richard. It is probable, that about eight years later, Richard began extending Hill Court, creating the house as we know it today. Unfortunately he died in 1748 before his alterations were completed. As it turned out the extensions were scarcely needed by Richard's family. His brother John died in 1759; their mother died in 1765 and was succeeded by her daughters, Alice who died in 1779, Mary who died in 1789 and Jane who died in 1806.

After Jane's death the Clarke estate was divided and Hill Court was inherited by her second cousin Kingsmill Evans, who, in the early nineteenth century, extended and improved the gardens belonging to the house. As he had no children when he died in 1851, he left the house to his nephew Captain Kingsmill Manley Power the son of Sir Manley Power and Anne Evans.

After the death of Captain Kingsmill Manley Power in 1888 Hill Court was bought in 1893 by Major Lionel James Trafford. Major Trafford was succeeded in 1900 by his brother Guy Rawson Trafford who married Miss Dorothy Moffatt, the daughter of Harold Moffat. After the death of her brother in 1916 Dorothy became heiress to Goodrich Court and so the two estates were united creating one estate of nearly two thousand acres, spanning several parishes. Guy Rawson Trafford was Sheriff of Herefordshire in 1919. In 1933 the main gate piers were moved to the position they are in today in front of the house, and details of the sad story connected with them can be found on a brass plate attached to one of the piers. It reads:- "These piers, moved from the east end of the avenue were in course of erection and the gates were in the making as a 21st Birthday present to Guy Harold Trafford when he was killed in a motor accident on his way to Queens College Oxford, 8 October 1933."

Dorothy's mother, Mrs Harold Moffatt, whose home was Goodrich Court, died in 1938. Upon her mother's death Dorothy left Hill Court and went to live at Goodrich Court. At her invitation Felsted School from Essex was evacuated to Mrs Trafford's three Herefordshire houses for the duration of the Second World War to be out of the way of German bombing. Hill Court was occupied from 1940 to March 1945 by Windsor's and Ingle's Houses of Felsted. When Felsted School left it became clear that it was impossible to maintain two large houses, so Dorothy Trafford moved back to Hill Court. There was no apparent use for Goodrich Court and in 1946 it was pulled down.

Dorothy died in 1954 and was succeeded by her son John Lionel Trafford who died unmarried in 1978. After his death the tenant farmers of the 2,000 acre estate were given the opportunity to purchase their farms. As a result of the division of the estate, Hill Court was reduced to its current size of approximately 40ha. In the early 1980s Hill Court was sold to Christopher Rowley who turned part of the estate into a garden centre. In 1994 the property was sold to Rehau Ltd, a private German Industrial Group and was completely renovated. In 1997 Rehau acquired the Church of the Paraclete to the east of the house. The Grade II listed closed church was built in 1905–06 to designs by George Frederick Bodley in memory of Major Lionel James Trafford.

== Former Residents ==
- Richard Clarke (d.1702), whom the house was originally built for
- Jane Clarke (d. 1806)
- Colonel Kingsmill Evans
- Sir Manley Power
- Kingsmill Manley Power (d. 1888)
- Major Lionel Trafford, purchased it in 1893
- In early 1980, interior designer Christopher Rowley and George Hartman bought Hill Court from Trafford Family. They lived there with another family Jose, Ana and Vanessa Marques until the house been sold
- They sold it to Rehau in 1994.
