= Fitzwilliam Coningsby =

English politician

Fitzwilliam Coningsby (died August 1666) was an English politician who sat in the House of Commons in 1621 and in 1640. He supported the Royalist cause in the English Civil War.

== Biography ==
Coningsby was born at Hampton Court, Herefordshire, the eldest son of the eminent soldier and politician Sir Thomas Coningsby, and his wife Phillipa Fitzwilliam, daughter of Sir William Fitzwilliam of Milton. He was High Steward of Leominster in 1605. He was educated at Hereford Cathedral School.

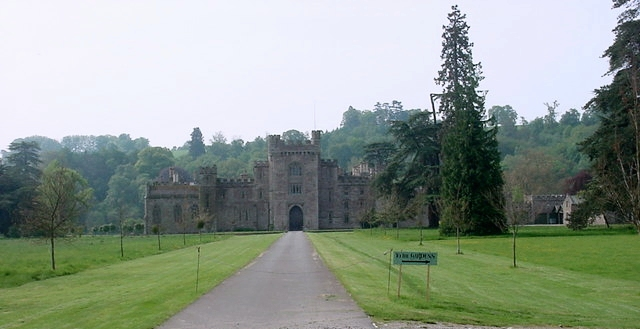
Hampton Court seen from north

In 1621, Coningsby was elected Member of Parliament for Herefordshire. In 1625 he inherited Hampton Court on the death of his father. He was High Sheriff of Herefordshire in 1626-27 and 1642-43.

In November 1640, Coningsby was elected again as MP for Herefordshire in the Long Parliament, but was expelled in 1641 for being a monopolist, He was one of the "Nine Worthies" - nine justices who formed the royalist leadership in Herefordshire in the summer of 1642. The others were Sir William Croft, Wallop Brabazon, Thomas Wigmore of Shobden, Thomas Price of Wisterdon, William Smallman, Henry Lingen, William Rudhall and John Scudamore.

Coningsby was Governor of Hereford when it briefly fell to William Waller in early 1643. He was replaced as commander of the city by Barnabas Scudamore who commanded it during the 1645 siege by Scottish Covenanter forces. He fought for the King throughout the Civil War until in 1646 he was found at the Siege of Worcester protesting against the surrender of the city by the Royalist commander. Coningsby then went into exile and suffered heavily in the sequestration of his estates, his wife Cecily and his children being reduced to comparative poverty. His petitions and those of his wife and of his sons, with the counter-petitions of his tenants and of Sir Thomas Allen, to whom the bulk of his estates had been granted, occupy six pages (2064–71) of the Calendar of the Committee for Compounding. In 1653 he was still desperately pleading "the starving condition" of himself and his family. At the Restoration of Charles II Coningsby recovered his estates.

Coningsby died in 1666 and was buried on 23 August 1666 at Hope under Dinmore, Herefordshire,

== Family ==
Coningsby married Cecily Nevill, daughter of Henry Nevill, 9th Baron Bergavenny and his first wife Lady Mary Sackville, on 12 July 1617 at St. Alphage, London. She was considered one of the beauties of the Jacobean court, and was painted several times, notably by John Hoskins. They had five children: Cecilia, Philippa, Humphrey, Thomas and Henry. Humphrey Coningsby replaced his father in the Long Parliament and was the father of Thomas Coningsby, 1st Earl Coningsby

Parliament of England
Preceded by Sir John Scudamore; Sir Herbert Croft	Member of Parliament for Herefordshire; 1621; With: Sir John Scudamore	Succeeded by Sir John Scudamore; Sir Robert Harley
Preceded by Sir Robert Harley; Sir Walter Pye	Member of Parliament for Herefordshire; 1640–1641; With: Sir Robert Harley	Succeeded by Sir Robert Harley; Humphrey Coningsby
