= Michael Brinton =

British businessman (1942-2012)

- Born: Michael Ashley Cecil Brinton; 1942
- Died: 2012 (aged 69–70)
- Occupations: Lord Lieutenant of Worcestershire (2001 to 2012); Chairman of Brintons

Michael Ashley Cecil Brinton, CVO, DL (1942 – 23 April 2012) was the son of Esme Tatton Cecil Brinton (1916–1985) and Mary Elizabeth Fahnestock (1914–1960), and was the Lord Lieutenant of Worcestershire from 2001 to 2012. Previously, he was High Sheriff of Hereford and Worcester in 1990.

He was a former chairman of the British carpet company Brintons.

His spouse was Angela Brinton. Their children were Julian Brinton, Henry Brinton and Birdie Burnell and their grandchildren Charlie Brinton, Archie Brinton, Robert Brinton, Jake Burnell, Lily Burnell, Elodie Burnell and Margot Brinton.

Honorary titles
Preceded by Thomas Raymond Dunne	Lord Lieutenant of Worcestershire; 2001–2012	Succeeded by Patrick Holcroft
