= Humphrey Coningsby =

English politician

Humphrey Coningsby (born ca. 1623) was an English politician who sat in the House of Commons from 1641 to 1644. He supported the Royalist side in the English Civil War.

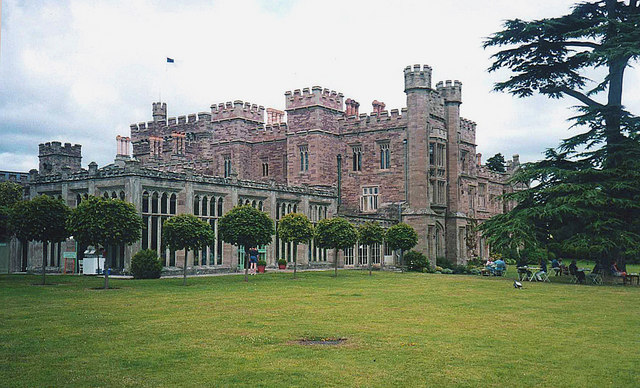
Hampton Court Castle, Herefordshire - seat of the Coningsby family

Coningsby was the eldest son of Fitzwilliam Conningsby, of Hampton Court, Herefordshire, and Cicely Nevill, daughter of Henry Nevill, 9th Baron Bergavenny. He matriculated at Lincoln College, Oxford on 23 February 1638, aged 15. He was of the Middle Temple in 1639.

In November 1641, Coningsby was elected Member of Parliament for Herefordshire in the Long Parliament, replacing his father who had been expelled as a monopolist. He supported the King and was disabled from sitting in parliament on 22 January 1644.

Coningsby married Lettice Loftus, eldest daughter of Sir Arthur Loftus of Rathfarnham, Ireland. Their son Thomas became Earl Coningsby.

In later life he is said to have suffered from mental health problems and to have died demented. His son Thomas accused Ferdinando Gorges, a wealthy Barbadian merchant who had lent his father large sums of money, of exercising undue influence over him. Notwithstanding this, Thomas married Gorges's daughter Barbara and had a number of children by her.

Parliament of England
Preceded by Sir Robert Harley; Fitzwilliam Coningsby	Member of Parliament for Herefordshire; 1641–1644; With: Sir Robert Harley	Succeeded by Sir Robert Harley
