= Manley Power =

British Army officer (1773–1826)

Lieutenant-General Sir Manley Power GCB
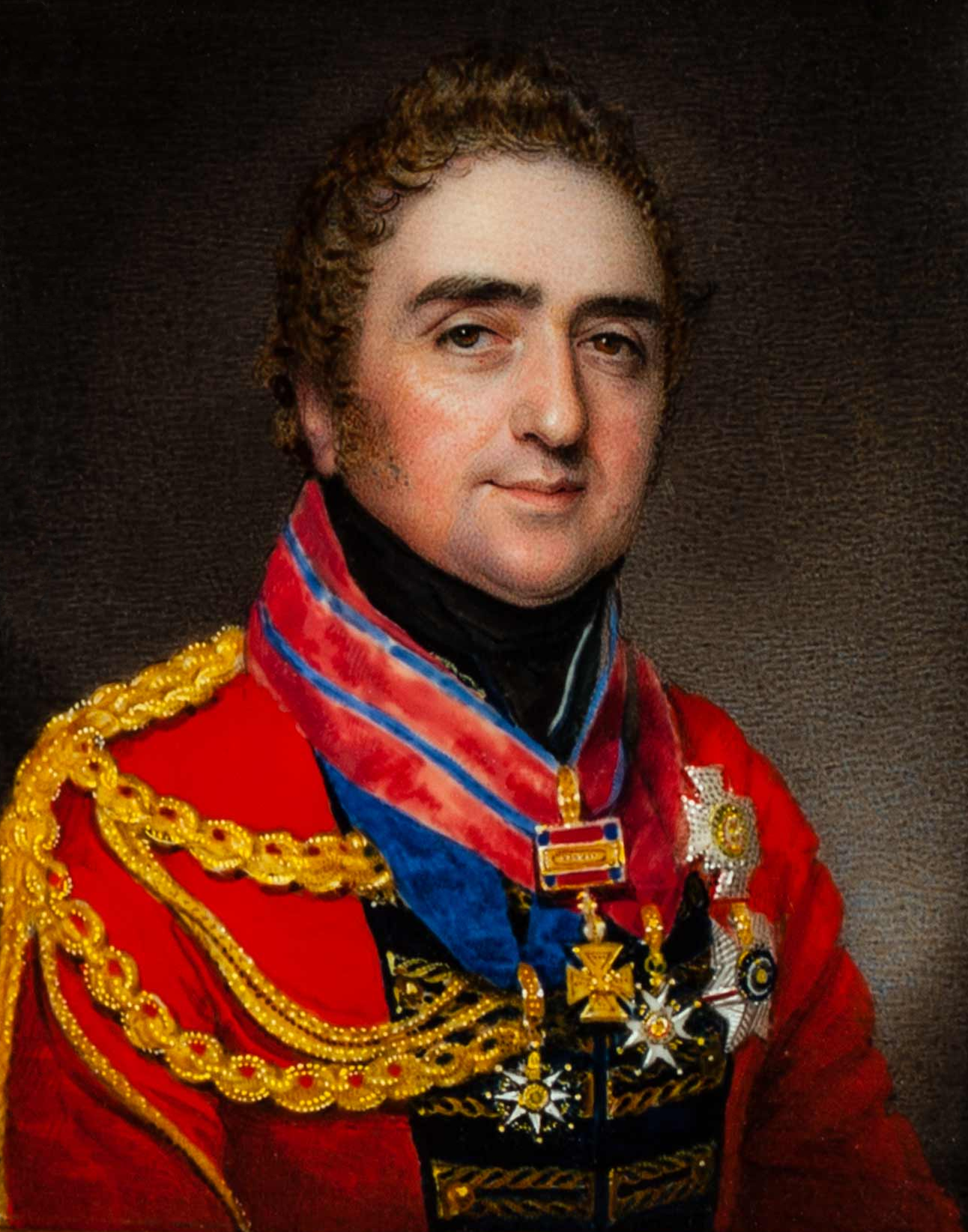
- Portrait by Charles Jagger, 1818
- Born: 1773; England
- Died: 7 July 1826 (aged 52–53); Bern, Switzerland
- Military career
- Allegiance: United Kingdom; Kingdom of Portugal
- Branch: British Army
- Service years: 1785–1826
- Rank: Lieutenant-General (Britain); Field Marshal (Portugal)
- Commands: 20th Regiment of Foot; 32nd Regiment of Foot; Portuguese infantry brigade 3rd Division; 3rd Infantry Brigade; 11th Infantry Brigade, 6th Division; 2nd Infantry Brigade, Army of Occupation of France; Lieutenant Governor of Malta
- Conflicts: French Revolutionary Wars; Anglo-Russian invasion of Holland; Battle of Alkmaar; Egypt Campaign; Siege of Alexandria; Napoleonic Wars; Peninsular War; Siege of Badajoz; Battle of Salamanca; Battle of Vitoria; Battle of the Pyrenees; Battle of Nivelle; Battle of Orthez; Battle of Toulouse; War of 1812; Plattsburgh campaign

Lieutenant-General Sir Manley Power KCB (1773 – 7 July 1826) was a British Army officer who fought in a number of campaigns for Britain and rose to the rank of lieutenant general. He is chiefly remembered for leading a brigade of Portuguese troops under the Duke of Wellington in the Iberian Peninsular War. He is also remembered for jointly causing the removal of Sir George Prevost, governor-in-chief of British North America, for Prevost's refusal to press the attack on Plattsburgh, New York, in 1814, during the War of 1812. After his active military service Power was appointed Lieutenant Governor of Malta.

== Early life ==
Manley Power's grandfather, Sir Henry Power, was a captain of the Battle-Axe Guards. His father, Captain Lieutenant Bolton Power, served in the 20th Regiment of Foot and fought in several battles of the Seven Years' War, and later in the American Revolutionary War under Guy Carleton and John Burgoyne. Manley Power followed in his forefather's footsteps and was a career soldier, starting as an ensign in his father's old regiment, the 20th Regiment of Foot, on 27 August 1783, when he was either 9 or 10 years old. He served in Halifax, Nova Scotia (1795–97), Holland (1799), and Menorca (1800). He was part of the force under the command of Sir Ralph Abercromby at the Battle of Alexandria (1801), and later served with the Royal Horse Guards (1803–05). After rising to Lieutenant-Colonel of the 32nd Regiment of Foot, he entered the Peninsular War and was attached to the Portuguese army under the command of Sir William Beresford and was promoted to lieutenant-general in 1813.

== Peninsular War ==
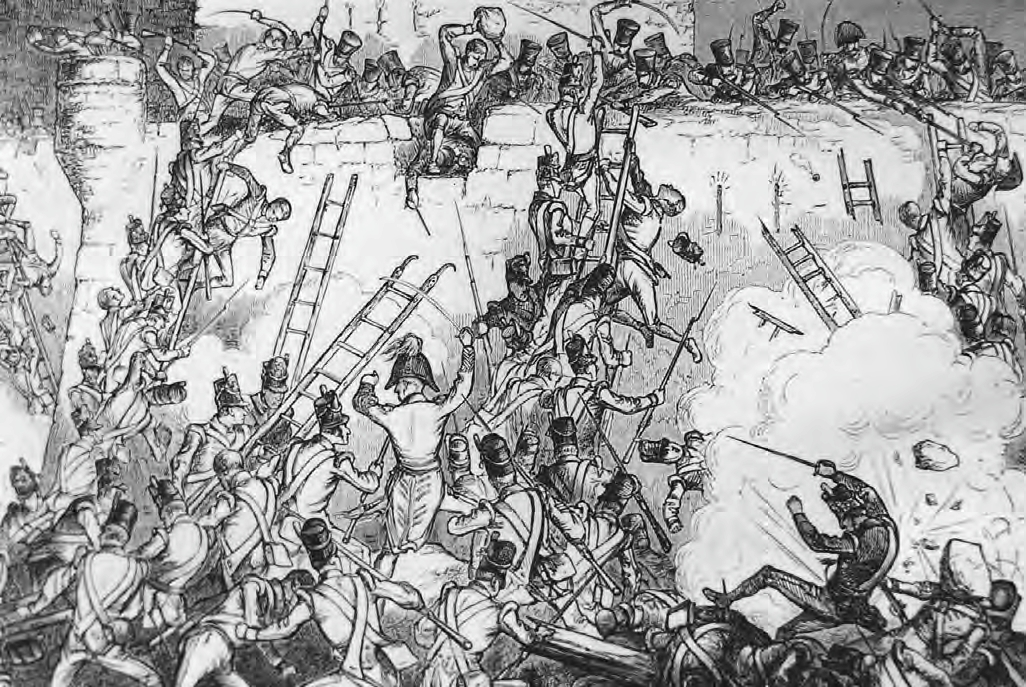
British infantry attempt to scale the walls of Badajoz

One of Portugal's strategies during the Peninsular War was to place troops under British command. Portuguese troops were poorly trained, but under Manley Power's leadership, Power's Portuguese were eventually regarded as equivalent to hardened British units, and saw much action, including the Battle of Salamanca, the Battle of Vitoria, the Battle of Fuentes de Oñoro, the Battle near Torres Vedras, and the Battle of Nivelle. Power's Portuguese formed part of the 3rd Division when it was led by Pakenham at Torres Vedras and Salamanca, and when it was led by Sir Thomas Picton at Fuentes de Onoro and Badajoz. Brigadier-general Manley Power was specifically mentioned by Parliament for distinguished exertions during the bloody siege of Badajoz where the 3rd was ordered to distract the enemy through a diversionary attack with ladders against the high walls of the fortress away from the main gates, but pressed the action to the point where it became the breakthrough into the fortress (Picton was wounded scaling the ladders but continued on). Picton also led the 3rd when it broke through at Vitoria. According to Picton, the fighting by the 3rd was so intense at the Battle of Vitoria, that the division lost 1,800 men (over one third of all British losses at the battle) having taken a key bridge and village, where they were subjected to fire by 40 to 50 cannons, and a counter-attack on the right flank (which was open because the rest of the army had not kept pace). Finally the 3rd was under the command of Charles Colville at the Battle of Nivelle where it took part in the main attack and then captured the bridge at Amotz under heavy resistance.

== War of 1812 ==
Manley Power and two other successful Peninsular War veteran brigade leaders, Thomas Brisbane and Frederick Philipse Robinson, were sent to bolster British forces in the War of 1812 in North America (and therefore did not participate in the Battle of Waterloo). The veteran brigade leaders were deeply disappointed by Sir George Prevost's caution at the Battle of Plattsburgh. Prevost had placed Francis de Rottenburg in charge of infantry, with the brigades under his command (Power with 3500, Brisbane with 3500, and Robinson with 2500 troops). The brigade leaders were dismayed with the decision to withdraw from battle because they felt they could have easily captured Plattsburgh despite the unsuccessful British naval action. Their opinions carried significant weight in Britain, which led to the removal of Prevost as Commander-in-Chief, North America. The Duke of Wellington wrote on 30 October 1814,

It is very obvious to me that you must remove Sir George Prevost. I see he has gone to war about trifles with the general officers I sent him, which are certainly the best of their rank in the army; and his subsequent failure and distresses will be aggravated by that circumstance; and will probably with the usual fairness of the public be attributed to it.

In December, Wellington's former Quartermaster General, Sir George Murray, was sent to Canada with the local rank of lieutenant-general, specifically to order Prevost to return to London to explain his conduct of the Plattsburg campaign. Another Peninsular War veteran and Manley Power's previous commanding officer, Sir Edward Pakenham, became the commander of the British North American army. Manley Power took part in the Battle of New Orleans, where Pakenham was killed, which unbeknown to its participants occurred after the Treaty of Ghent was signed in Belgium, but it did not take effect until it was ratified by the United States in February 1815.

== Occupation of France ==
He was then reassigned to Europe in 1815 to rejoin the 3rd Division, which was still under the command of Charles Colville, to lead the 2nd Brigade, as part of the British Army force occupying Flanders and France.

On 25 October 1818, General Murray appointed him to be the commanding officer at Calais to oversee the evacuation of British troops from France. When it was completed, the mayor of Calais wrote a letter to express thanks for his "considerate treatment of the French and of the town of Calais during the embarkation."

== Later life ==
Sir Manley Power later served as the Lieutenant Governor of Malta for six years. Manley Power would have been familiar with the island, having been previously stationed there in 1802 with the 20th Regiment of Foot.

In addition to his battle honours, for his role in Peninsular War, Portugal conferred on him Knight Commander of the Order of the Tower and Sword. The honour Knight Commander of the Order of the Bath was conferred on him on 2 January 1815.

When in England, Manley Power and his family lived in Hill Court Manor, Walford, near Ross-on-Wye, Herefordshire. Based on Burke's records, he was likely Lord of the manor of Walford, Ross, Ross Foreign, Aston Ingham, and Wilton. Sir Manley Power died on 7 July 1826, in Bern, Switzerland, after a few hours illness while returning from Malta to England. He is buried at Bath Abbey in England.

A march named Sir Manley Power was the official quick march used by the 57th (West Middlesex) Regiment of Foot ("the Die Hards"—a nickname earned at the Battle of Albuera); presumably adopting the march sometime after serving in the 2nd Division during the Peninsular war, continuing to use it as the Middlesex Regiment formed in 1881, and later as part of the 4th Battalion (Middlesex) of the Queen's Regiment.
