= Herefordshire (constituency) =

Parliamentary constituency in the United Kingdom, 1832–1885

- Former county constituency for the House of Commons
- Context: 1832–1868. Extract from 1837 result: the southern 'doubly' orange area with thin blue stripes.
- County: Herefordshire

1290–1885
- Seats: Two, then three from 1832
- Replaced by: Leominster; Ross

The county constituency of Herefordshire, in the West Midlands of England bordering on Wales, was abolished when the county was divided for parliamentary purposes in 1885. It was a constituency of the House of Commons of the Parliament of England, then of the Parliament of Great Britain from 1707 to 1800 and of the Parliament of the United Kingdom from 1801 to 1885.

The undivided county was represented from 1290 by two Knights of the Shire until 1832 and three thereafter. After the county was split two new county constituencies were created, the North division or Leominster and the South division or Ross.

== Boundaries ==
The constituency consisted of the historic county of Herefordshire. Although Herefordshire contained a number of parliamentary boroughs, each of which elected one or two MPs in its own right for parts of the period when Herefordshire was a constituency, these areas were not excluded from the county constituency. Owning freehold property of the required value, within such boroughs, could confer a vote at the county election. From 1832 only non-resident owners of forty-shilling freeholds, situated in borough seats, could qualify for a county vote on the basis of that property.

== Members of Parliament ==
=== 1290–1604 ===
Constituency created (1290)

Parliament	First member	Second member
1290	Sir Roger le Rous	
1315	Sir Hugh de Croft	
1318	Sir Roger Chandos	
1330	John le Rous	
1336–1337	John le Rous	
1340	John le Rous	
1340	Sir Roger Chandos	
1343	John le Rous	
1343	Sir Roger Chandos	
1355	Sir Thomas Chandos	
1355	Sir Richard de la Bere	
1360	Sir Thomas Chandos	
1370	Sir Thomas Chandos	
1376	Peter de la Mare	
1377 (Jan)	Peter de la Mare	Sir Robert Whitney
1377 (Oct)	Peter de la Mare	
1378	Sir Walter Devereux of Bodenham	Sir John Eylesford
1379	Sir Walter Devereux of Bodenham	Sir Robert Whitney
1380 (Jan)	Peter de la Mare	Sir Robert Whitney
1381	Sir Walter Devereux of Bodenham	Ralph Lengayne
1381	Sir Walter Devereux of Bodenham	Peter de la Mare
1382	Sir John Eylesford	Peter de la Mare
1382 (May, Sep)	Sir Walter Devereux of Bodenham	Peter de la Mare
1383	Sir William Devereux of Frome	Sir Andrew Herle
1383 (Oct)	Sir Walter Devereux of Bodenham	Sir Andrew Herle
1384	Kynard de la Bere	Richard Mawarden
1386	Kynard de la Bere	Sir Thomas de la Barre
1388 (Feb)	Leonard Hakluyt	Richard Nash
1388 (Sep)	Malcolm de la Mare	William Seymour
1390 (Jan)	(Sir) Kynard de la Bere	Thomas Oldcastle
1390 (Nov)	Roger Wigmore	Richard Nash
1391	Sir Robert Whitney	Roger Wigmore
1393	Sir John Chandos	Thomas Oldcastle
1394	(SIR) Leonard Hakluyt	Thomas Clanvowe
1395	Sir John Chandos	Thomas Walwyn I
1397 (Jan)	(Sir) Thomas Clanvowe	Thomas Walwyn II
1397 (Sep)	(Sir) Thomas Clanvowe	John Skydemore
1399	(Sir) Kynard de la Bere	Thomas Walwyn II
1401	Sir Walter Devereux of Bodenham and Weobley	Sir John Greyndoe
1402	Sir Thomas de la Barre	Philip Holgot
1404 (Jan)	Sir John Oldcastle	Thomas Walwyn II
1404 (Oct)	Sir John Greyndore	Thomas Walwyn II
1406	John ap Harry	Thomas Holgot
1407	John ap Harry	Thomas Holgot
1410	John ap Harry	Thomas Holgot
1411		
1413 (Feb)		
1413 (May)	Thomas de la Hay	Thomas Holgot
1414 (Apr)	Sir John Skydemore	John Russell
1414 (Nov)	Sir John Skydemore	Thomas Holgot
1415		
1416 (Mar)	Sir Thomas de la Barre	Sir Robert Whitney II
1416 (Oct)		
1417	John Russell	Thomas Holgot
1419	John Russell	John Merbury
1420	John Russell	John Brugge
1421 (May)	John Russell	John Merbury
1421 (Dec)	John Russell	John Merbury
1422	John Russell	Sir Robert Whitney II
1423	John Russell	Thomas de la Hay
1425	John Merbury	
1426	John Russell	Sir John Skydemore
1427	John Merbury	
1428	Walter Devereux	
1429	John Russell	Sir John Skydemore
1431	John Russell	Giles Brydges
1432	John Russell	
1433	John Russell	Sir John Skydemore
1434	Walter Devereux	
1436	Sir Walter Devereux	Sir Kynard de la Bere
1437		John Abrahall
1439		John Abrahall
1440	Sir Walter Devereux	John Abrahall
1442		John Abrahall
1450 (Nov)	Sir Walter Devereux	
1455	Giles Brydges	
1459	Walter Devereux	
1471	Sir Richard Croft	
1472	Thomas Brydges	
1476	Sir James Baskerville	
1504	__? Mynors	Sir Gruffydd ap Rhys
1510–1515	No Names Known	
1523	Sir Richard Cornwall	?
1529	Sir Richard Cornwall, died and replaced c.1533 by James Baskerville	John Rudhale, died and replaced c.1532 by John Scudamore
1536		
1539	George Cornwall	John Lingen
1542	?John Vaughan	James Croft
1545		
1547	James Baskerville	John Gwillim
1553 (Mar)		
1553 (Oct)	Humphrey Coningsby	Stephen Parry
1554 (Apr)	John Lingen	John Baskerville
1554 (Nov)	Richard Sebourne	Thomas Havard
1555	John Baskerville	Stephen Parry
1558	Gregory Price	John Pateshall
1559 (Jan)	Sir Robert Whitney	Humphrey Coningsby
1562–1563	Sir James Croft	James Warnecombe
1571	Sir James Croft	John Scudamore
1572 (Apr)	Sir James Croft	John Scudamore
1584 (Nov)	Sir James Croft	John Scudamore
1586 (Oct)	Sir James Croft	John Scudamore
1588 (Oct)	Sir James Croft	John Scudamore
1593	Sir Thomas Coningsby	Herbert Croft
1597 (Sep)	Sir Thomas Coningsby	Sir John Scudamore
1601	Sir Thomas Coningsby	Sir Herbert Croft

=== 1604–1832 ===
As there were sometimes significant gaps between Parliaments, the dates of first assembly and dissolution are given for those up to 1640. Where the name of the member has not yet been ascertained or is not recorded in a surviving document, the entry unknown is entered in the table.

Elected	Assembled	Dissolved	First member	Second member
1604	19 March 1604	9 February 1611	Sir James Scudamore	Sir Herbert Croft
1614	5 April 1614	7 June 1614	Sir James Scudamore	Sir Herbert Croft
1621	16 January 1621	8 February 1622	Sir John Scudamore, Bt	Fitzwilliam Coningsby
1624	12 February 1624	27 March 1625	Sir John Scudamore, Bt	Sir Robert Harley
1625	17 May 1625	12 August 1625	John Rudhale	Sir Giles Brydges, Bt
1626	6 February 1626	15 June 1626	Sir Robert Harley	Sir Walter Pye
1628	17 March 1628	10 March 1629	Sir Giles Brydges, Bt	Sir Walter Pye
1629–1640	No Parliaments convened			

Election	First member	First party	Second member	Second party
Herefordshire was represented by 2 elected Knights of the Shire
1640, April	Sir Robert Harley		Sir Walter Pye	
1640, November	Sir Robert Harley	Parliamentarian	Fitzwilliam Coningsby	
c. 1641	Sir Robert Harley	Parliamentarian	Humphrey Coningsby	Royalist
c. 1644	Sir Robert Harley	Parliamentarian	vacant	
c. 1646	Sir Robert Harley	Parliamentarian	Edward Harley	Parliamentarian
1647, 29 January	Sir Robert Harley	Parliamentarian	vacant	
1648, 8 June	Sir Robert Harley	Parliamentarian	Edward Harley	Parliamentarian
1648, 6 December	vacant		vacant	
Herefordshire was represented by 2 nominated MPs in Barebone's Parliament
1653	Wroth Rogers		John Herring	
Herefordshire's representation was increased to 4 elected MPs in the First and Second Parliaments of the Protectorate
1654	John Scudamore	John Pateshal	John Flacket	Richard Read
1656	James Berry	Edward Harley	Bennet Hoskyns	Benjamin Mason
Herefordshire's representation was decreased to 2 MPs in the Third Parliament of the Protectorate and thereafter
1659, January	Wroth Rogers		Bennet Hoskyns	
1659, May	vacant		vacant	
1660, 18 April	Edward Harley		William Powell	
1661, 20 March	James Scudamore		Thomas Prise	
1668, 23 September	Sir John Kyrle		Thomas Prise	
1679, 26 February	The Viscount Scudamore		Sir Herbert Croft, Bt	
1679, 10 September	The Viscount Scudamore		Sir Edward Harley	
1685, 18 March	Sir John Morgan, Bt	Tory	Sir John Hoskyns, Bt	
1689, 15 January	Sir John Morgan, Bt	Tory	Sir Edward Harley	Whig
1690, 12 March	Sir John Morgan, Bt	Tory	Sir Herbert Croft, Bt	Whig
1693, 8 February	Sir Edward Harley	Whig	Sir Herbert Croft, Bt	Whig
1698, 3 August	Henry Cornewall	Tory	Henry Gorges	Tory
1701, 16 January	Sir John Williams, Bt	Tory	Henry Gorges	Tory
1705, 16 May	The Viscount Scudamore	Tory	Henry Gorges	Tory
1708, 12 May	The Viscount Scudamore	Tory	John Prise	Tory
1712, 30 July	The Viscount Scudamore	Tory	Sir Thomas Morgan, Bt	Tory
1715, 9 February	Richard Hopton		Sir Thomas Morgan, Bt	Tory
1717, 6 March	Richard Hopton		Sir Hungerford Hoskyns, Bt	
1722, 28 March	Velters Cornewall	Tory	Sir Edward Goodere, Bt	Tory
1727, 6 September	Velters Cornewall		Edward Harley	Tory
1742, 6 January	Velters Cornewall		Thomas Foley	
1747, 15 July	Velters Cornewall		Lord Harley	
1755, 5 May	Velters Cornewall		Sir John Morgan, Bt	
1767, 18 May	Velters Cornewall		Thomas Foley	
1768, 6 April	Thomas Foley		Thomas Foley	
1774, 12 October	Thomas Foley		Sir George Cornewall, Bt	
1776, 22 May	Thomas Harley	Tory	Sir George Cornewall, Bt	
1780, 18 September	Thomas Harley	Tory	Sir George Cornewall, Bt	Whig
1796, 8 June	Thomas Harley	Tory	Robert Biddulph	Whig
1802, 14 July	Sir George Cornewall, Bt	Tory	John Cotterell	Tory
1803, 31 March	Sir George Cornewall, Bt	Tory	John Matthews	Tory
1806, 8 November	Sir George Cornewall, Bt	Tory	Sir John Cotterell, Bt	Tory
1807, 13 May	Thomas Foley	Whig	Sir John Cotterell, Bt	Tory
1818, 29 June	Sir Robert Price, Bt	Whig	Sir John Cotterell, Bt	Tory
1831, 7 May	Sir Robert Price, Bt	Whig	Kedgwin Hoskins	Whig
Herefordshire's representation was increased to 3 MPs in the 1832 general election and thereafter

=== 1832–1885 ===
Election	First member	First party	Second member	Second party	Third member	Third party
1832	Edward Thomas Foley	Tory	Kedgwin Hoskins	Whig	Sir Robert Price, Bt	Whig
1834	Edward Thomas Foley	Conservative	Kedgwin Hoskins	Whig	Sir Robert Price, Bt	Whig
1841	Thomas Baskerville	Conservative	Kedgwin Hoskins	Whig	Joseph Bailey	Conservative
1847	Francis Haggitt (F.R. Wegg-Prosser, 1849)	Conservative	George Cornewall Lewis	Whig	Joseph Bailey	Conservative
1850 by-election	Francis Haggitt (F.R. Wegg-Prosser, 1849)	Conservative	George Cornewall Lewis	Whig	Thomas William Booker-Blakemore	Conservative
1852	James King King	Conservative	Hon. Charles Hanbury	Conservative	Thomas William Booker-Blakemore	Conservative
1857	James King King	Conservative	Sir Geers Cotterell, Bt	Whig	Thomas William Booker-Blakemore	Conservative
1858 by-election	James King King	Conservative	Sir Geers Cotterell, Bt	Whig	Lord Montagu Graham	Conservative
1859	James King King	Conservative	Humphrey St John-Mildmay	Liberal	Lord Montagu Graham	Conservative
1865	James King King	Conservative	Sir Joseph Bailey	Conservative	Michael Biddulph	Liberal
1868	Sir Herbert Croft, Bt	Conservative	Sir Joseph Bailey	Conservative	Michael Biddulph	Liberal
1874	Daniel Peploe Peploe	Conservative	Sir Joseph Bailey	Conservative	Michael Biddulph	Liberal
1880	Thomas Duckham	Liberal	Sir Joseph Bailey	Conservative	Michael Biddulph	Liberal
1885	Constituency abolished: see Leominster and Ross.					

== Election results ==
=== Elections in the 1830s ===
General election 1830: Herefordshire
Party	Candidate	Votes	%
Tory	John Cotterell	Unopposed	
Whig	Robert Price	Unopposed	
Registered electors		c. 5,000	
Tory hold			
Whig hold			

General election 1831: Herefordshire
Party	Candidate	Votes	%
Whig	Robert Price	Unopposed	
Whig	Kedgwin Hoskins	Unopposed	
Registered electors		c. 5,000	
Whig hold			
Whig gain from Tory			

General election 1832: Herefordshire
Party	Candidate	Votes	%
Whig	Robert Price	Unopposed	
Whig	Kedgwin Hoskins	Unopposed	
Tory	Edward Thomas Foley	Unopposed	
Registered electors		5,013	
Whig hold			
Whig hold			
Tory win (new seat)			

General election 1835: Herefordshire
Party	Candidate	Votes	%
Whig	Kedgwin Hoskins	3,012	28.9
Conservative	Edward Thomas Foley	2,802	26.9
Whig	Robert Price	2,657	25.5
Conservative	Edward Poole	1,964	18.8
Turnout		4,306	86.6
Registered electors		4,970	
Majority		210	2.0
Whig hold			
Majority		145	1.4
Conservative hold			
Majority		693	6.7
Whig hold			

General election 1837: Herefordshire
Party	Candidate	Votes	%
Whig	Robert Price	Unopposed	
Whig	Kedgwin Hoskins	Unopposed	
Conservative	Edward Thomas Foley	Unopposed	
Registered electors		7,216	
Whig hold			
Whig hold			
Conservative hold			

=== Elections in the 1840s ===
General election 1841: Herefordshire
Party	Candidate	Votes	%	±%
Conservative	Thomas Baskerville Mynors Baskerville	Unopposed		
Conservative	Joseph Bailey	Unopposed		
Whig	Kedgwin Hoskins	Unopposed		
Registered electors		7,365		
Conservative hold				
Conservative gain from Whig				
Whig hold				

General election 1847: Herefordshire
Party	Candidate	Votes	%	±%
Conservative	Joseph Bailey	Unopposed		
Conservative	Francis Haggitt	Unopposed		
Whig	George Cornewall Lewis	Unopposed		
Registered electors		7,345		
Conservative hold				
Conservative hold				
Whig hold				

=== Elections in the 1850s ===
Bailey's death caused a by-election.

By-election, 18 October 1850: Herefordshire
Party	Candidate	Votes	%	±%
Conservative	Thomas William Booker	Unopposed		
Conservative hold				

General election 1852: Herefordshire
Party	Candidate	Votes	%	±%
Conservative	James King King	3,167	26.0	N/A
Conservative	Thomas William Booker	3,143	25.8	N/A
Conservative	Charles Bateman-Hanbury	3,030	24.9	N/A
Whig	George Cornewall Lewis	2,836	23.3	N/A
Majority		194	1.6	N/A
Turnout		5,949 (est)	85.3 (est)	N/A
Registered electors		6,972		
Conservative hold		Swing	N/A	
Conservative hold		Swing	N/A	
Conservative gain from Whig		Swing	N/A	

General election 1857: Herefordshire
Party	Candidate	Votes	%	±%
Whig	Geers Cotterell	3,352	29.4	+6.1
Conservative	Thomas William Booker-Blakemore	2,822	24.7	−1.1
Conservative	James King King	2,771	24.3	−1.7
Conservative	Charles Bateman-Hanbury	2,475	21.7	−3.2
Majority		877	7.7	N/A
Turnout		6,041 (est)	82.4 (est)	−2.9
Registered electors		7,330		
Whig gain from Conservative		Swing	+6.1	
Conservative hold		Swing	−1.6	
Conservative hold		Swing	−1.9	

Booker-Blakemore's death caused a by-election.

By-election, 18 December 1858: Herefordshire
Party	Candidate	Votes	%	±%
Conservative	Montagu Graham	Unopposed		
Conservative hold				

General election 1859: Herefordshire
Party	Candidate	Votes	%	±%
Conservative	James King King	Unopposed		
Liberal	Humphrey Francis St John-Mildmay	Unopposed		
Conservative	Montagu Graham	Unopposed		
Registered electors		7,722		
Conservative hold				
Liberal hold				
Conservative hold				

=== Elections in the 1860s ===
General election 1865: Herefordshire
Party	Candidate	Votes	%	±%
Conservative	Joseph Bailey	Unopposed		
Liberal	Michael Biddulph	Unopposed		
Conservative	James King King	Unopposed		
Registered electors		7,179		
Conservative hold				
Liberal hold				
Conservative hold				

General election 1868: Herefordshire
Party	Candidate	Votes	%	±%
Conservative	Herbert Croft	3,351	30.9	N/A
Conservative	Joseph Bailey	3,341	30.8	N/A
Liberal	Michael Biddulph	2,273	21.0	N/A
Liberal	Thomas Blake	1,878	17.3	N/A
Majority		1,068	9.8	N/A
Turnout		5,422 (est)	56.9 (est)	N/A
Registered electors		9,528		
Conservative hold				
Conservative hold				
Liberal hold				

=== Elections in the 1870s ===
General election 1874: Herefordshire
Party	Candidate	Votes	%	±%
Conservative	Joseph Bailey	Unopposed		
Liberal	Michael Biddulph	Unopposed		
Conservative	Daniel Peploe Peploe	Unopposed		
Registered electors		8,977		
Conservative hold				
Liberal hold				
Conservative hold				

=== Elections in the 1880s ===
General election 1880: Herefordshire
Party	Candidate	Votes	%	±%
Conservative	Joseph Bailey	3,077	27.7	N/A
Liberal	Michael Biddulph	2,769	24.9	N/A
Liberal	Thomas Duckham	2,726	24.6	N/A
Conservative	Daniel Peploe Peploe	2,527	22.8	N/A
Turnout		5,550 (est)	67.5 (est)	N/A
Registered electors		8,222		
Majority		308	2.8	N/A
Conservative hold		Swing	N/A	
Majority		199	1.8	N/A
Liberal hold		Swing	N/A	
Liberal gain from Conservative		Swing	N/A	

== See also ==
- List of former United Kingdom Parliament constituencies
- Unreformed House of Commons
