= Paul Foley (cricketer) =

English cricketer, cricket administrator, barrister

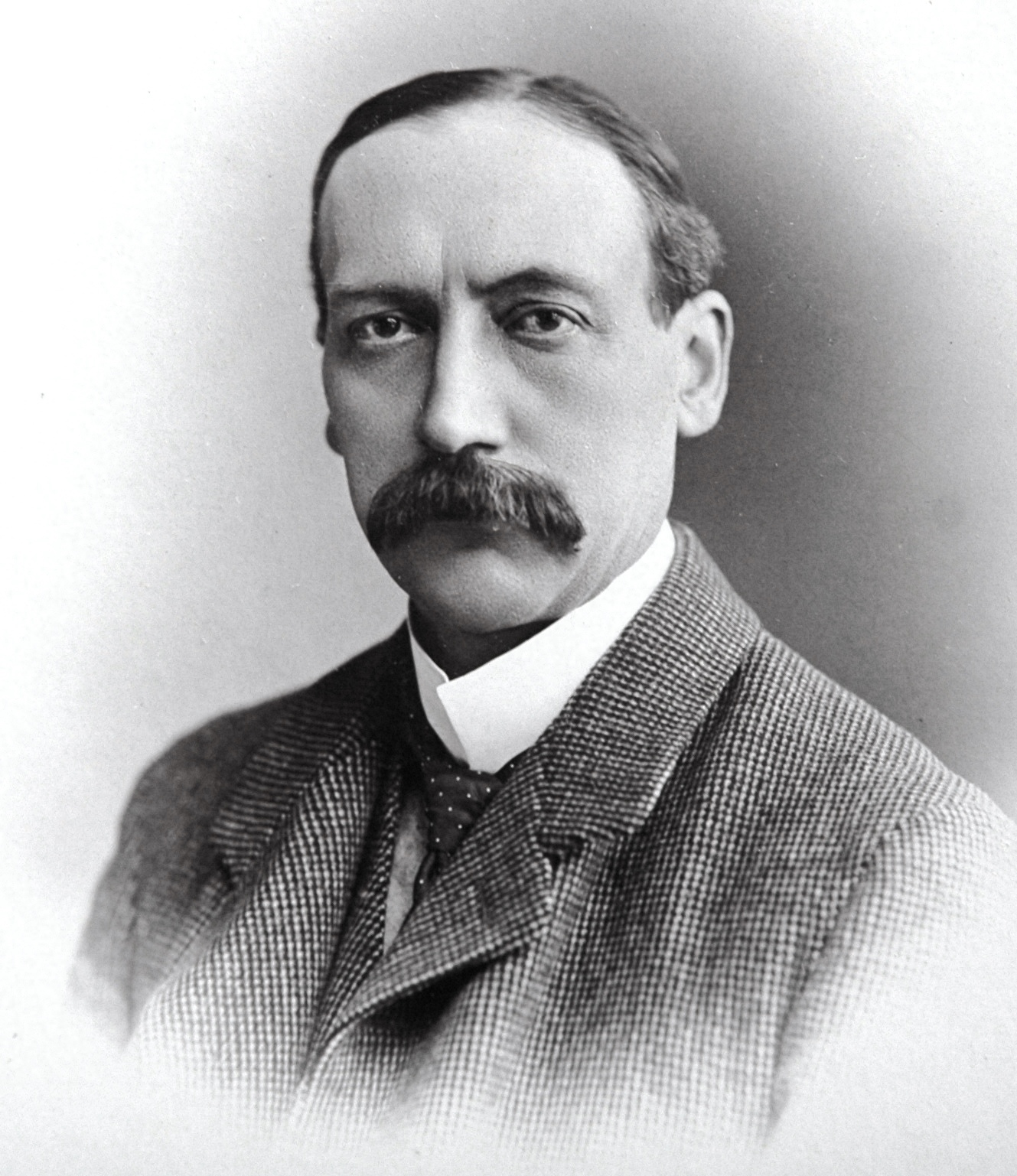

Personal information
- Full name: Paul Henry Foley
- Born: 19 March 1857; Westminster, London, England
- Died: 21 January 1928 (aged 70); Pimlico, London, England
- Height: 6 ft 3 in (1.91 m)
- Batting: Left-handed
- Bowling: Right-arm underarm slow
- Relatives: Henry Foley (son); Cyril Foley (cousin)

Domestic team information
- Years: Team
- 1891: Marylebone Cricket Club
- 1895–1896: Worcestershire

Career statistics
Competition	First-class
Matches	1
Runs scored	21
Batting average	10.50
100s/50s	–/–
Top score	13
Catches/stumpings	–/–
- Source: Cricinfo, 13 November 2020

Paul Henry Foley JP (19 March 1857 – 21 January 1928) was an English first-class cricketer, cricket administrator and barrister.

The son of Henry Hodgetts-Foley, a politician and member of a Stourbridge family of ironmasters, he was born at Westminster in March 1857. He was educated at Eton College, before going up to Christ Church, Oxford. A student of the Inner Temple, he was called to the bar in June 1880.

Although he did not play cricket for Oxford University Cricket Club, Foley was well connected in cricketing circles and became a member of the Marylebone Cricket Club (MCC) in 1878. He would make his only appearance in first-class cricket for the MCC in 1891, against Somerset at Taunton. Batting twice in the match, he was dismissed in the MCC first innings by Ted Tyler, while in their second innings he was dismissed for 13 runs by the same bowler. Foley became associated with Worcestershire County Cricket Club in 1878, later playing for them twice in the 1895 and 1896 Minor Counties Championship against Staffordshire and Northamptonshire.

Foley had a greater impact with Worcestershire as an administrator. He was elected co-secretary in 1885, holding that post until 1887, before becoming honorary secretary in 1892. He was influential in the creation of the Minor Counties Championship in 1895, with Worcestershire sharing the inaugural Minor Counties Championship with Norfolk and Durham. Under Foley's guidance, he transformed the county from a team of amateurs which played mostly one-day matches, to a team composed mainly of professionals playing 3-day matches. The county went on to win the competition in 1896, 1897 and 1898, prompting Worcestershire to apply for first-class status, which they gained in 1899 and were admitted to the County Championship. Foley was also the main proponent for Worcestershire's move from their Boughton Park home ground to New Road in 1896 when he acquired a lease on a field from the Dean and Chapter of Worcester Cathedral, with Foley paying for the construction of the pavilion at New Road. He remained the honorary secretary of Worcestershire until 1908.

Outside of cricket, Foley also served as a justice of the peace. He lived near Stourbridge at the Prestwood Estate, where he employed Harry Foster. Following the death of Lady Emily Foley he inherited Stoke Edith House. He served as the High Sheriff of Herefordshire in 1906. In 1926, he donated 136 rare books in 242 volumes from the Stoke Edith House to Hereford Cathedral's library. However, the following year Stoke Edith House was destroyed by fire. Foley died suddenly at Pimlico in January 1928. His son Henry, and cousin Cyril Foley both played first-class cricket. Foley's Cafe at New Road, which opened in 2017, is named in honour of Foley.
