= Robert Harley (1579–1656) =

English statesman

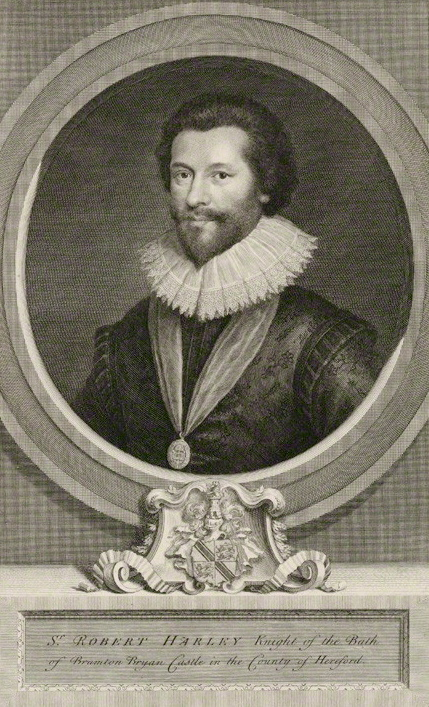
Sir Robert Harley

Sir Robert Harley KB (baptised 1 March 1579 – 6 November 1656) was an English statesman who served as Master of the Mint for Charles I. A devout Puritan, he supported Parliament in the Wars of the Three Kingdoms.

== Life ==
He was the son of Thomas Harley of Brampton Bryan Castle in Herefordshire and his wife Margaret, daughter of Sir Andrew Corbet. He entered Oriel College, Oxford in 1595, earning a BA in 1599. He entered Middle Temple in 1599. He was invested as a Knight of the Bath on 25 July 1603.

After his first marriage in 1603, he served in various local offices in Herefordshire and Radnorshire, including representing Radnor in Parliament in 1604, Herefordshire in 1624 and 1626 and Evesham in 1628. In 1623 he had married Brilliana, daughter of Sir Edward Conway, one of the Secretaries of State, and acted as his aide in Parliament. He was rewarded for this by being appointed Master of the Mint. He was deprived of this office in 1635 but reinstated in 1643. During this period, his attitude was more that of a country gentleman than of a courtier.

In religion (like Brilliana), Harley was a puritan, taking an anti-Catholic and later also anti-Arminian line. He was successively elected to both Parliaments in 1640 (Short Parliament and Long Parliament), where he opposed ship money, Laudian ecclesiastical innovations and the Scottish War. This led him to join the Parliamentary party. Harley was in charge of the Committee for the Demolition of Monuments of Superstition and Idolatry, and presided over the destruction of a great deal of religious art and architecture.

He was an active member of that party both in Parliament and in Herefordshire, Brampton Bryan Castle undergoing siege in 1643 and 1644. On 30 September 1642, Parliamentarians led by Harley and Henry Grey, 1st Earl of Stamford occupied Hereford without opposition. In December, they withdrew to Gloucester because of the presence in the area of a Royalist army under Lord Herbert.

His support for reconciliation with the king led to his being excluded from the House of Commons in Pride's Purge. He and his son Edward, a colonel in the Parliamentarian army, were imprisoned until after the king's execution. He resigned as Master of the Mint in May 1649 and took no further part in politics.

He left several sons, his heir Edward being the father of Queen Anne's Lord Treasurer, Robert Harley, who was raised to the peerage as the Earl of Oxford and Earl Mortimer.

== Sources ==
- Jacqueline Eales, 'Harley, Sir Robert (1579–1656)' Oxford Dictionary of National Biography, Oxford University Press, 2004 (article 12343).
- Craig, John (1953). The Mint: A History of the London Mint from A.D. 287 to 1948. Cambridge, England: Cambridge University Press. pp. 143–152. ASIN B0000CIHG7.

Government offices
Preceded by Sir Randal Cranfield	Master of the Mint; 1626–1635	Succeeded by In Commission to Sir Ralph Freeman; Sir Thomas Aylesbury
Preceded by In Commission to Sir Ralph Freeman; Sir Thomas Aylesbury	Master of the Mint; 1649–1649	Succeeded by Aaron Guerdon
Parliament of England
Preceded by Stephen Price	Member of Parliament for Radnor; 1604–1611	Succeeded by Rowland Meyrick
Preceded by Sir John Scudamore; Fitzwilliam Coningsby	Member of Parliament for Herefordshire; 1624; With: Sir John Scudamore	Succeeded by John Rudhale; Sir Giles Brydges
Preceded by John Rudhale; Sir Giles Brydges	Member of Parliament for Herefordshire; 1626; With: Sir Walter Pye	Succeeded by Sir Walter Pye; Sir Giles Brydges
Vacant Parliament suspended since 1629	Member of Parliament for Herefordshire; 1640–1648; With: Sir Walter Pye 1640; Fitzwilliam Coningsby 1640–1641; Humphrey Coningsby 1641–1644; Edward Harley 1646–1648	Not represented in Rump parliament
