= George Cornwall (MP) =

16th-century English politician

George Cornwall (by 1509–1562), of Berrington, Herefordshire, English Bicknor, Gloucestershire and Stanage, Radnorshire, was an English politician.

He was a member (MP) of the parliament of England for Herefordshire in 1539. He was the son of Herefordshire MP, Richard Cornwall.
