= Henry Foley (English cricketer) =

English cricketer

Personal information
- Full name: Henry Thomas Hamilton Foley
- Born: 25 April 1905; Stoke Edith Park, Hereford
- Died: 13 December 1959 (aged 54); Stoke Edith Park, Hereford
- Batting: Left-handed
- Bowling: Left arm medium
- Relatives: Robert Pearson (father-in-law)

Domestic team information
- Years: Team
- 1925: Worcestershire

Career statistics
Competition	First-class
Matches	1
Runs scored	6
Batting average	6.00
100s/50s	0/0
Top score	6
Catches/stumpings	0/0
- Source: , 2 August 2008

Henry Thomas Hamilton Foley (25 April 1905 – 13 December 1959) was an English cricketer who played a single first-class match for Worcestershire against Oxford University in May 1925; he scored 6 and 0 not out. He later played for Monmouthshire in the Minor Counties Championship. His father was the cricketer and administrator Paul Foley.
