= Thomas de la Barre =

English politician

Sir Thomas de la Barre (c. 1349 – 18 December 1419) was an English politician. He sat as MP for Herefordshire in 1386, Hertfordshire in 1401, Herefordshire in 1402, Hertfordshire in 1407 and 1411 and Herefordshire in March 1416.

He was knighted by 1373.

== Political career ==
He also served as Sheriff of Herefordshire from 11 November 1384 till 10 December 1385, 1 December 1388 till 15 November 1389, 9 November 1395 till 1 December 1396, Sheriff of Essex and Hertfordshire from 1 December 1415 till 30 November 1416; justice of the peace fo Herefordshire from 9 November 1385 till November 1389, 2 March till November 1399, 9 July 1419 till his death, in Hertfordshire from 16 May 1401 till January 1414 and 4 May 1419 till his death; escheator of Gloucestershire, Herefordshire and the adjacent march from 13 July till November 1388.

He also served as commissioner of inquiry concerning alienation of Eaton Tregoes) in Herefordshire in February 1391, concerning concealments in Hertfordshire in June 1406; commissioner to make proclamation against adherents of Walter Brut in Herefordshire in September 1393, to make proclamation of Henry IV's intention to govern well in Hertfordshire in May 1402; commissioner to survey lands of condemned Lords Appellant of 1388 in West Midlands and the march in October 1397; commissioner of array in Herefordshire in December 1399 and September 1403, in Herefordshire and Hertfordshire in March 1419; commissioner of oyer and terminer in Hertfordshire and Buckinghamshire in July 1403; commissioner to raise royal loans in Hertfordshire in March and June 1406 and November 1419.

== Family ==
He was the third son and eventual heir of Thomas de la Barre by Hawise, the sister and co-heiress of Sir Richard Pembridge. By 1381, he was married to Elizabeth (died 14 December 1420), the daughter of Sir William Croyser by his first wife, the widow of Sir Ralph Camoys and Sir Edward Kendale (died 1375). They had one son and one daughter.
