= Richard Tomkins =

British journalist (born 1952)

Richard Tomkins, born 4 September 1952, was a senior writer and commentator on the staff of the Financial Times. He took early retirement in 2009, after 25 years on the newspaper.

== History ==
Richard Tomkins attended King Edward's School in Birmingham. Before joining the Financial Times, he spent five years in the Civil Service, three of them as assistant private secretary to a government minister; left to travel the world; and served a three-year apprenticeship with his local newspaper, the Walsall Observer.

At the Financial Times, Tomkins was a columnist, writing a weekly column on consumer culture, and also wrote occasional editorial comments, known as leaders. From 1993 to 1999, he was a member of the FT's New York bureau at a time when the newspaper was undertaking a rapid expansion in the US.

During his years at the Financial Times, Tomkins won all three of what were then the top awards in British journalism. In 1991, with other members of a reporting team at the FT, he was jointly named Reporter of the Year in the British Press Awards for his part in investigating the collapse of the Bank of Credit and Commerce International. In 2003 he was named Business Journalist of the Year in the Business Journalist of the Year Awards. In 2007, he was awarded the £10,000 David Watt Prize for outstanding political journalism for a feature on globalisation and its effects on the living standards of employees in the west.

In his last years on the Financial Times, Tomkins was chief feature writer, writing mainly for the FT Magazine.
