= Walter Pye (Royalist) =

English politician

Sir Walter Pye (1610–1659) of The Mynde, Much Dewchurch, Herefordshire was an English politician who sat in the House of Commons variously between 1628 and 1640. He supported the Royalist cause in the English Civil War.

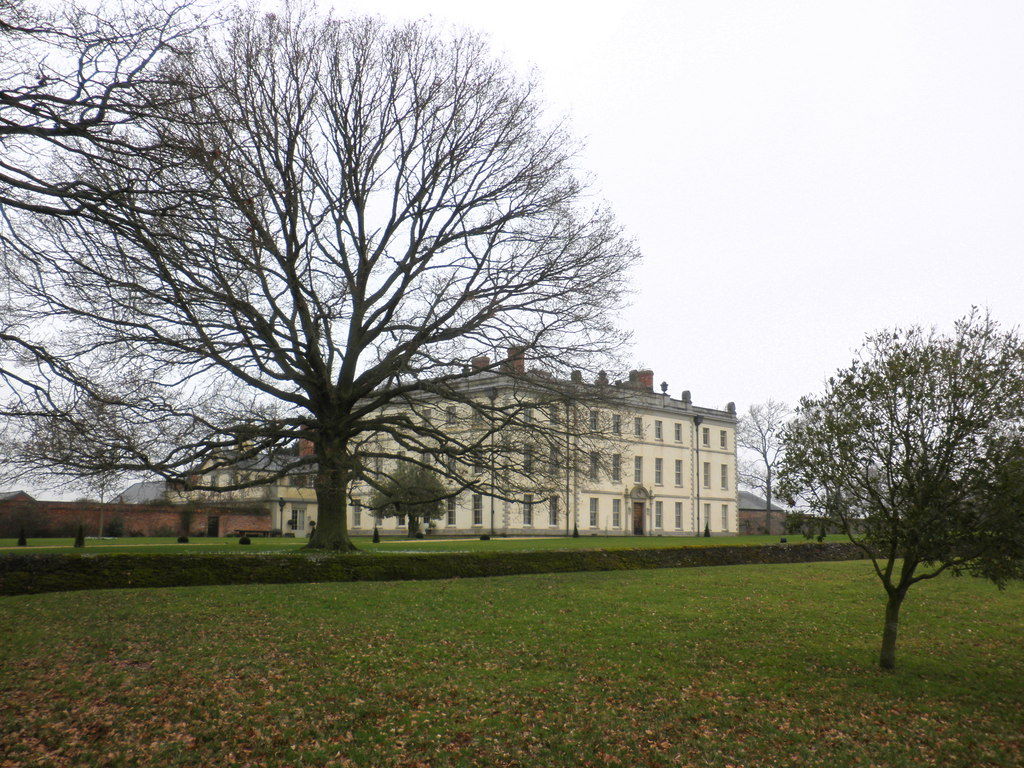
The Mynde today

== Biography ==
Pye was the son of Walter Pye of The Mynde. In 1628, he was elected Member of Parliament for Brecon and sat until 1629 when King Charles decided to rule without parliament for eleven years.

In April 1640, Pye was elected MP for Herefordshire in the Short Parliament. He was High Steward of Leominster. He was a supporter of the King and on this account was deprived of his office in 1648.

== Family ==
Pye married Elizabeth, daughter of John Sanders, and had three children. The children remained Catholic and his son Walter maintained allegiance to the exiled Stuarts and lived on the continent where he was given the title Lord Kilpec.

== Notes ==
Parliament of England
Preceded by Sir Humphrey Lynde	Member of Parliament for Brecon; 1628–1629	Parliament suspended until 1640
Vacant Parliament suspended since 1629	Member of Parliament for Herefordshire; 1640 (April); With: Sir Robert Harley	Succeeded by Sir Robert Harley; Fitz-Williams Coningsby
