= The Mynde =

Country house in Herefordshire, England

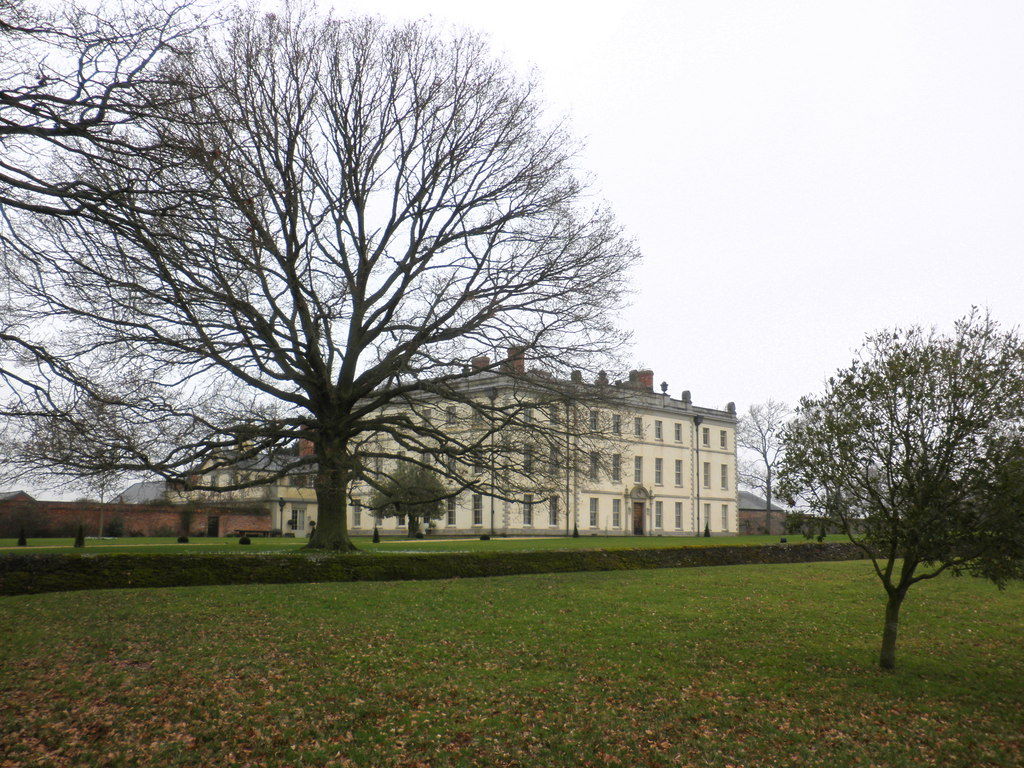
- The Mynde East elevation

Additional information
Location in Herefordshire
51.96348°N 2.771801°W
Location	Much Dewchurch, Herefordshire, England
Listed Building – Grade I
Official name	The Mynde
Designated	20 October 1952
Reference no.	1348825

The Mynde is a country house in Much Dewchurch, Herefordshire. Originally built in the 15th and 16th centuries, it was remodelled in the 18th century and refronted in the 19th century by William Atkinson. Built of sandstone rubble and brick, it is stuccoed on three sides. It has a rectangular floor plan with rear projecting wings to the west and an east facing frontage and is built in 3 storeys with a hipped Welsh slate roof. The main front elevation has 9 bays, with the central five bays slightly projecting, with a porch flanked by Doric columns supporting an entablature. It stands in a 1,180-acre estate and is approached along a mile-long private 'carriage drive' with views of the gardens, lake and the surrounding Herefordshire countryside. The house is a Grade I listed building.

== History ==
The estate had descended in the Pye family since the Norman conquest and was their family seat in Tudor times. Amongst the Pye owners of the property were the lawyer and Elizabethan courtier Walter Pye I and the Royalist courtier Walter Pye II.

In 1709 the Duke of Chandos acquired the house and added the striking Kings Hall with plasterwork by Bugatti and Attari.

In 1740 it was purchased by Richard Symons of London. He was succeeded by his son John Symons in 1753, who became MP for Hereford in 1754. He and his wife Ann (nee Colebrooke) had no children and following his death on 30 December 1763 the estate passed to his nephew Richard Peers. This was subject to his wife being allowed to live there for her natural life and Peers taking the name Symons. Ann died on 4 March 1765 aged 53. Sir Richard Symons, MP for Hereford until 1784, died unmarried and childless in 1797. By his grandfather's will the estate passed to Thomas Raymond, the eldest son of the grandfather’s niece Mary Raymond, who likewise adopted the Symons name and arms. The estate then descended in the direct male line of the Symons family to Thomas Edward Raymond Symons (d. 1928), on whose death it was sold to a fellow army officer, Henry Ambrose Clive, younger son of General Edward Henry Clive of Perrystone Court, Herefordshire. In 1959 the estate was bought by William Anthony Twiston-Davies (d. 1989); his son, Audley, completed a restoration of the main house between 1997 and 2001, and put the property on the market in 2013.

In 2016 the property was sold for £15m to Richard and Sarah Burt. The Mynde is a Grade I listed building.
