= Alexander Pearson (cricketer) =

Scottish cricketer and advocate

Personal information
- Full name: Alexander Gillespie Pearson
- Born: 21 January 1856; Edinburgh, Midlothian, Scotland
- Died: 24 January 1931 (aged 75); Locarno, Ticino, Switzerland
- Batting: Right-handed
- Bowling: Right-arm roundarm medium
- Relatives: Robert Pearson (brother)

Domestic team information
- Years: Team
- 1876–1878: Oxford University

Career statistics
Competition	First-class
Matches	12
Runs scored	163
Batting average	8.15
100s/50s	–/–
Top score	35
Balls bowled	781
Wickets	16
Bowling average	18.06
5 wickets in innings	–
10 wickets in match	–
Best bowling	3/10
Catches/stumpings	5/–
- Source: Cricinfo, 26 June 2020

Alexander Gillespie Pearson (21 January 1856 – 24 January 1931) was a Scottish first-class cricketer and legal advocate.

The son of Andrew Pearson, he was born at Edinburgh in January 1856. He was educated firstly at the Loretto School in Musselburgh, before transferring to Rugby School. From Rugby, he matriculated ar Balliol College, Oxford in 1875. While studying at Oxford, he played first-class cricket for Oxford University from 1876–78, making sixteen appearances. Pearson scored 163 runs at an average of 8.15, with a high score of 35. With his right-arm roundarm medium pace bowling, he took 16 wickets at a bowling average of 18.06 and best figures of 3 for 10.

After graduating from Oxford, Pearson became a member of the Faculty of Advocates. He was also a justice of the peace for Dumfriesshire. Pearson died in Switzerland at Locarno in January 1931. His brother, Robert, also played first-class cricket.
