= Walter Pye (lawyer) =

English barrister, courtier, administrator and politician

Sir Walter Pye
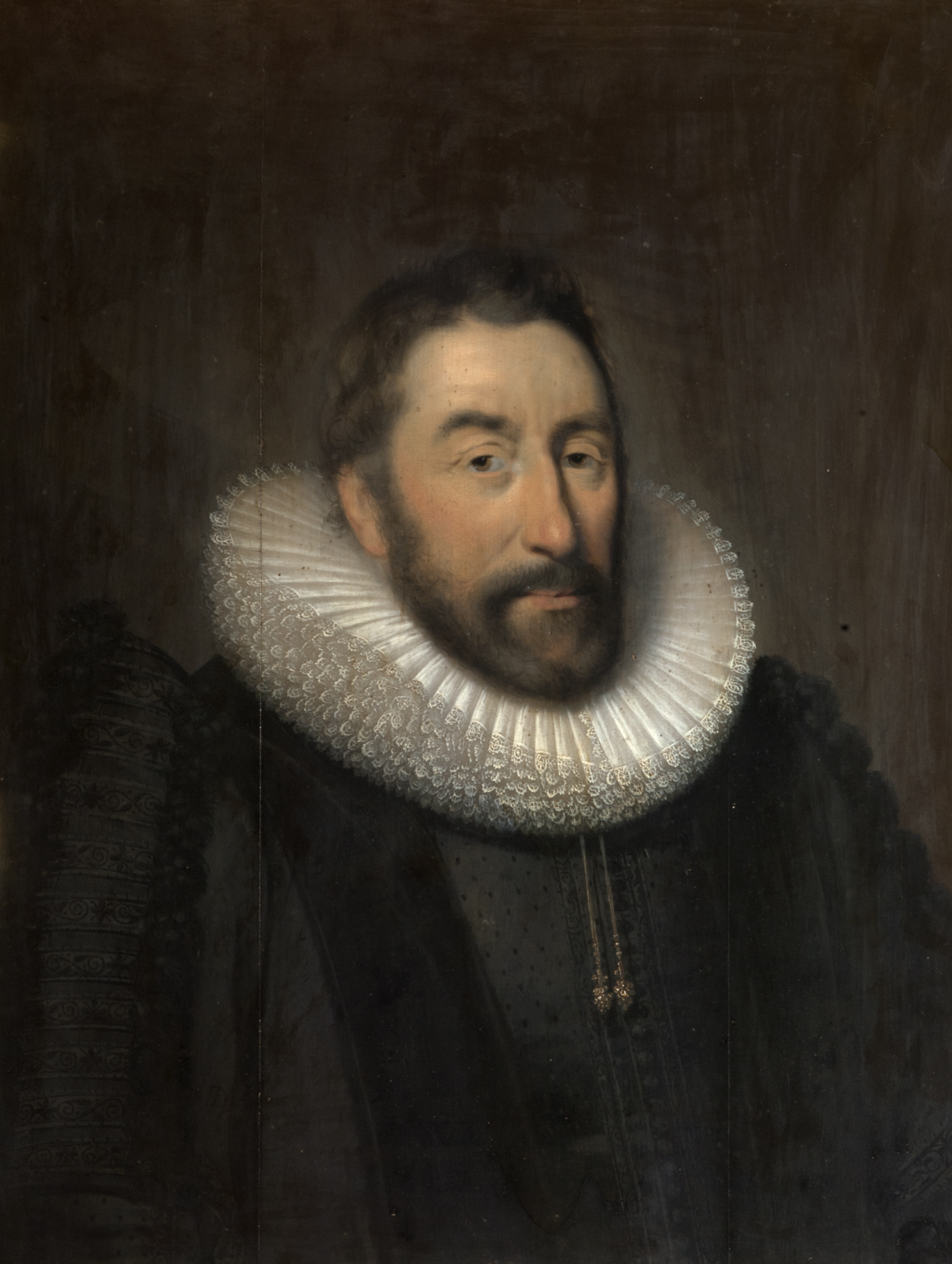
- Portrait of Pye, by Cornelius Johnson, 1631

Member of Parliament for Herefordshire
- In office 1626–1629 Serving with Sir Robert Harley, Sir Giles Brydges
- Preceded by: John Rudhale; Sir Giles Brydges
- Succeeded by: Parliament suspended until 1640

Member of Parliament for Brecon
- In office 1621–1626
- Preceded by: Sir John Crompton
- Succeeded by: Sir Humphrey Lynde

Member of Parliament for Scarborough
- In office 1597–1597 Serving with Thomas Posthumous Hoby
- Preceded by: Edward Gate; Edward Cary
- Succeeded by: Edward Stanhope; William Eure

Personal details
- Born: 1571
- Died: 26 December 1635 (aged 64)
- Spouses: Joan Rudshall (m. 1602; died 1625) Hester Ireland Crispe (m. 1628)
- Relations: Robert Pye (brother); Henry Cornewall (grandson)
- Children: 15, including Walter
- Parent(s): Roger Pye; Bridget Kyrle
- Education: St John's College, Oxford

Sir Walter Pye (1571 – 26 December 1635) of The Mynde, Herefordshire was an English barrister, courtier, administrator and politician who sat in the House of Commons from 1621 and 1629.

== Early life ==
Pye was baptised on 1 October 1571 the eldest son of Bridget (née Kyrle) Pye and Roger Pye of The Mynde at Much Dewchurch in Herefordshire. His brother Robert Pye was also an MP and his maternal grandfather was Thomas Kyrle of Walford.

He was educated at St John's College, Oxford and became a barrister at Middle Temple.

== Career ==
He succeeded to his father's estates in 1591 and was elected MP for Scarborough in 1597. He was favoured by Buckingham and was made justice in Glamorgan, Breconshire and Radnorshire on 8 February 1617. In 1621 he became attorney-general of the Court of Wards. Also in 1621 he was elected Member of Parliament for Brecon. He was re-elected for Brecon in 1624 and in 1625. In 1626 he was elected MP for Brecon and for Herefordshire and chose to sit for Herefordshire. He was re-elected MP for Herefordshire in 1628 and sat until 1629 when King Charles decided to rule without parliament for eleven years. He was knighted at Whitehall on 29 June 1630.

== Personal life ==
On 22 July 1602, Pye married Joan Rudshall (died 1625), daughter of William Rudshall of Rudshall, Gloucestershire. Together, they were the parents of seven sons and eight daughters, including:

- Joanna Pye (born 1606), who married Thomas Beale.
- Anne Pye (1608–1689), who died unmarried.
- Sir Walter Pye (1610–1659), who married Elizabeth Sanders, daughter of John Sanders.
- Alice Pye (1612–1662), who married Sir Henry Lingen.
- Mary Pye (born 1618), who married Sir Thomas Tomkins in 1633.
- John Pye (1620–1701), who married Blanche Lingen, sister to Sir Henry Lingen.
- Frances Pye (1621–1701), who married Henry Vaughan, of Bredwardine. After his death, she married Edward Cornewall of Moccas Court.

After the death of his first wife, he married Hester (née Ireland) Crispe (1568–c. 1643), daughter of John Ireland of London and widow of Ellis Crispe, alderman of London, on 31 October 1628. From her first marriage, she was the mother of Sir Nicholas Crispe, 1st Baronet and Tobias Crisp, among others.

Pye died on 26 December 1635, at the age of 64, and was buried at Much Dewchurch where there is an elaborate alabaster monument to his memory. His widow died c. 1643.

=== Descendants ===
Through his son Walter, he was a grandfather of Walter Pye, Baron Kilpeck (c. 1631–1690), and Robert Pye, who married Meliora Drax, a daughter of Sir James Drax.

Through his daughter Frances, he was a grandfather of Roger Vaughan (c. 1641–1672), MP for Hereford, and Henry Cornewall (c. 1654–1717), MP for Weobley.

== Notes ==
Parliament of England
Preceded by Edward Gate; Edward Cary	Member of Parliament for Scarborough; 1597; With: Thomas Posthumous Hoby	Succeeded by Edward Stanhope; William Eure
Preceded by Sir John Crompton	Member of Parliament for Brecon; 1621–1626	Succeeded by Sir Humphrey Lynde
Preceded by John Rudhale; Sir Giles Brydges	Member of Parliament for Herefordshire; 1626–1629; With: Sir Robert Harley 1626; Sir Giles Brydges 1628–1629	Parliament suspended until 1640
