= Stoke Edith House =

Country house in Stoke Edith, Herefordshire, England

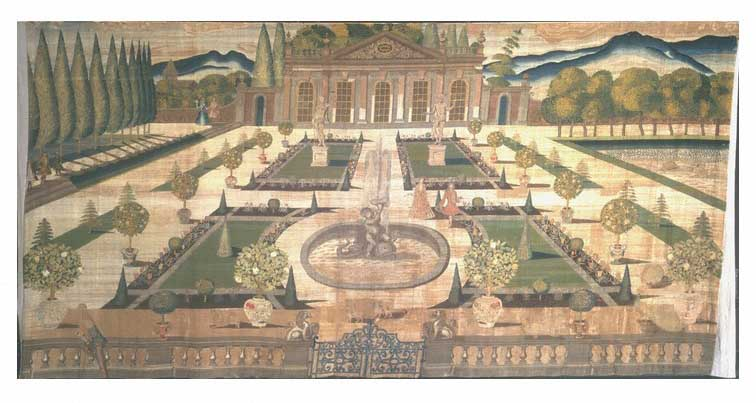
- Stoke Edith Wall Hanging
- Interactive map of the Stoke Edith House area

General information
- Location: Stoke Edith, Herefordshire, England, England
- Coordinates: 52.0627°N 2.5778°W
- Completed: 1697

Stoke Edith House is a derelict country house with surrounding park in Stoke Edith, Herefordshire, England. The present 17th century quadrangular mansion was preceded by a multi-gabled, Elizabethan home. Set within gardens, it was destroyed by fire in 1927.

== History ==
Stoke Edith was the principal manor of Sir Henry Lingen (1612 – 1662), Royalist cavalier. He and the resident rector, Henry Rogers, denounced for their political leanings, knew the property could be victimized at any time. Lingen's widow, Alice Pye of the Mynnd, sold the manor in the 1670s to the ironmaster Thomas Foley, who settled it on his second son Paul. Paul obtained licence from James II to empark up to 500 acres at Stoke Edith. After a visit by the leading garden designer, George London, in 1692, the park and gardens were remodelled to his suggestion, and it is likely that pleasure grounds would have been laid out around the house in a series of formal compartments with geometric walks, flower-beds and fountains. Paul rebuilt the timber-framed ancient mansion, Stoke Court, from 1695, when he became Speaker, and it was mostly complete by 1698. It was finished by his son, Thomas, Auditor of the imprests. The house, subsequently known as Stoke Park, descended in the family to Thomas Lord Foley, who (having inherited the Great Witley estate from his distant cousin Thomas 2nd Baron Foley) settled Stoke Edith on his second son Edward Foley (1747–1803), an MP.

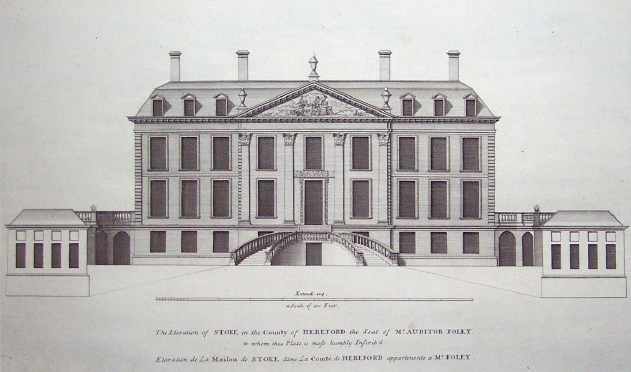
Stoke Edith House, as pictured at the time of Thomas Foley, Auditor of the imprests.

Many of the family were members of Parliament. Stoke Park remained their principal residence until it was destroyed by fire in 1927. The present Stoke Edith House (once the Rectory), the park and extensive agricultural and woodlands remain in the ownership of the Foley family. The former rectory became a Grade II listed building on 20 October 1952.

== Architecture and fittings ==
A prior house, Elizabethan in style, was characterized by its multiple shaped gables and stone detailing. That house was superseded by the present mansion, quadrangular in shape, and constructed of red brick, with wings. It was considered to be a good example of Williamite architecture from the late 17th century period. The interior included a state wing is to the west and a parlour room in the centre of the house. There was a long study, a drawing room, a wainscotted dining room, and an embellished hall. The east-wing stair was top-lit.

The Stoke Edith Wall Hanging, dating to 1710-20 and which originally hung in the house, is now on display in the Victoria and Albert Museum. In 1926, Paul Henry Foley donated 136 rare books in 242 volumes from the house to Hereford Cathedral's library.

== Grounds ==
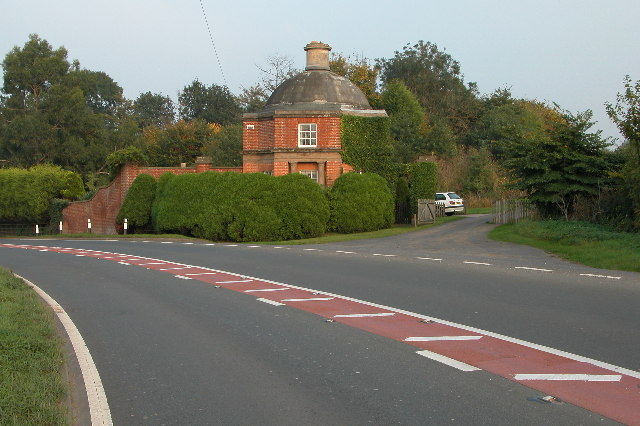
Stoke Edith Park Gatehouse

The grounds are terraced and are within a wooded park. Improvements to the park were made by Humphry Repton in the late 18th century, and to the formal garden by William Andrews Nesfield in the 1850s. This included an arabesque pattern, box edging, coloured walks, steep grass slope, and beech trees. Garden fittings included a statue of old Father Time and a sundial with the motto Horas non numero nisi serenas ("I count only the sunny hours").
