= Kynard de la Bere =

English politician (died 1402)

Sir Kynard de la Bere of Kinnersley, Herefordshire (died 22 June 1402) was an English politician and soldier. He sat as MP for Herefordshire in April 1384, 1386, January 1390, and 1399.

He was knighted by May 1387.

== Political career ==
He also served as commissioner to put down rebellion in Herefordshire in December 1381, March 1382, and December 1382; commissioner to seize Bartholomew Gorges in June 1384; commissioner of inquiry in Herefordshire in February 1385 concerning murder, in November 1388, and December 1391 concerning the lands of Sir Simon Burley, in February 1391 concerning the alienation of Eaton Tregoes; commissioner of array in April 1385, March 1392, and December 1399; commissioner to arrest adherents of Walter Brut in September 1393; commissioner of oyer and terminer in Warwickshire in February 1400; commissioner to resist Welsh rebels and relieve Abergavenny in May 1401; and commissioner to make proclamation of Henry IV's intention to govern well in Herefordshire in May 1402.

He also served as justice of the peace for Herefordshire from 20 December 1382 till December 1390, and 28 November 1399 till his death; Sheriff of Herefordshire from 18 November 1387 till 1 December 1388, 1 December 1396 till 3 November 1397, and 8 November 1401 till 14 February 1402.

== Family ==
He was the son and heir of Sir Richard de la Bere of Kinnersley. c. 1387, he married Katherine, the widow of Sir John Peeche of Hampton in Arden, Warwickshire and they had one son and one daughter.
