= John Baskerville (MP for Herefordshire) =

Member of the Parliament of England

John Baskerville (by 1517 – 23 September 1577), of Chanstone Court, Vowchurch and Eardisley, Herefordshire, was a Member of Parliament for Herefordshire in April 1554 and 1555.
