= Cradley, Herefordshire =

Village in Herefordshire, England

Coordinates: 52.1220°N 2.3877°W

Cradley
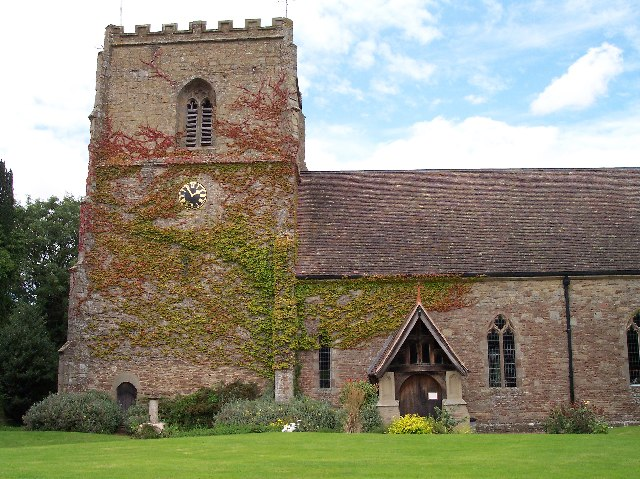
- Cradley Church

- Location within Herefordshire
- Population: 1,667 (2011)
- OS grid reference: SO735471
- Civil parish: Cradley and Storridge
- Unitary authority: Herefordshire
- Ceremonial county: Herefordshire
- Region: West Midlands
- Country: England
- Sovereign state: United Kingdom
- Post town: Malvern
- Postcode district: WR13
- Police: West Mercia
- Fire: Hereford and Worcester
- Ambulance: West Midlands
- UK Parliament: North Herefordshire

Cradley (/ˈkrædli/) is a village in the civil parish of Cradley and Storridge, in Herefordshire, England. The nearest Herefordshire towns to Cradley are Ledbury, 9 miles (14 km) to the south and Bromyard, 9 miles to the north-west. The Worcestershire town of Malvern is 4 miles (6 km) to the south-east on the farther side of the Malvern Hills. Cradley and Storridge parish had a 2011 population of 1,667. On 12 October 2018 the parish was renamed from "Cradley" to "Cradley & Storridge".

Cradley village hall is a 16th-century timbered building. It was built as a school for boys. It has been renovated and restored after a fire destroyed a large part of the roof. It has 21st-century additions of meeting rooms, and is a heritage and village resource centre. Used for research into local history and genealogy, it has computer, printing and copying services. Since the closure of the combined village shop and post office, a post office counter with usual services is part of the village hall. A new village stores opened in 2022.

The parish church is dedicated to St James. The chancel was added by Sir George Gilbert Scott in 1868. Pevsner also mentions a mediaeval lychgate, a font dated 1722 and the remains of a previous carved font incorporated into a doorway in the tower. Carved stones in the fabric of the church have been identified as dating from the Saxon period.

The "Three Villages Festival" celebrates the rural Herefordshire life of the villages of Cradley, Storridge and Mathon. In 2011, the event's theme was "Masquerade", an exploration of mask making and wearing.
