= Tiggy Legge-Bourke =

British royal nanny and personal assistant (born 1965)

Tiggy Legge-Bourke MVO
- Born: Alexandra Shân Legge-Bourke; 1 April 1965 (age 61); Glanusk Park, Brecknockshire, Wales
- Education: Heathfield and Institut Alpin Videmanette, Switzerland
- Occupation: Former royal nanny
- Employer: Charles, Prince of Wales (formerly)
- Spouse: Charles Pettifer (m. 1999)
- Children: 2
- Parents: William Legge-Bourke; Shân Legge-Bourke
- Relatives: Harry Legge-Bourke (paternal grandfather); Wilfred Bailey (maternal grandfather)

Alexandra Shân "Tiggy" Pettifer (née Legge-Bourke; born 1 April 1965) is a Welsh former nanny and companion to Prince William and Prince Harry. She was a personal assistant to Charles III (then Prince of Wales) from 1993 to 1999. She has used her married name since her marriage to Charles Pettifer in 1999.

== Background ==
Legge-Bourke is the daughter of William Legge-Bourke (1939–2009), who served in the Royal Horse Guards. After taking a degree at Magdalene College, Cambridge, he became a merchant banker at Kleinwort Benson and was deputy lieutenant of Powys from 1997 until his death. Legge-Bourke's mother, Dame Shân Legge-Bourke (1943–2025), was the only child of Wilfred Bailey, 3rd Baron Glanusk (1891–1948), a soldier who became a colonel in the Grenadier Guards and also served as Lord Lieutenant of Brecknockshire. When Shân Bailey's father died in 1948, she and her mother inherited his estate at Glanusk Park, near Crickhowell in Powys, while his peerage went to a cousin. Shân Legge-Bourke was appointed a lady-in-waiting to the Princess Royal in 1987, was High Sheriff of Powys in 1991, and was the Lord Lieutenant of Powys until 2018.

Tiggy Legge-Bourke's paternal grandfather, Sir Harry Legge-Bourke (1914–1973), was a member of parliament for the Isle of Ely from 1945 until 1973 and was chairman of the 1922 Committee of Conservative backbenchers. His death in 1973 led to a by-election won by the Liberal Clement Freud.

She is a cousin of the public relations executive and television personality Eleanor Legge-Bourke.

Legge-Bourke was reported in 1994 to be fond of fly fishing and long walks in the country.

== Early life ==
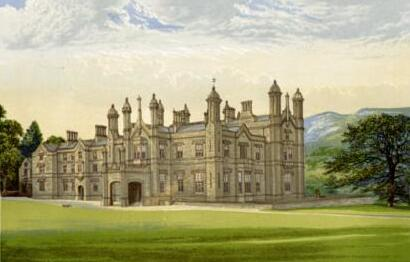
The first Glanusk Park, Tiggy Legge-Bourke's ancestral home, built by her ancestor the ironmaster Sir Joseph Bailey

Brought up at Glanusk Park, a 6,000-acre (2,400 ha) estate in Wales, Tiggy Legge-Bourke was educated at Heathfield School, Ascot, which she left with four O-levels, and the Institut Alpin Videmanette at Rougemont in Switzerland, a finishing school also attended by Diana, Princess of Wales.

She has a sister and a brother, Zara and Harry. In 1985, Zara (b. 1966) married Captain Richard Grosvenor Plunkett-Ernle-Erle-Drax, also known as Richard Drax.

Legge-Bourke's brother Harry, born in 1972, was a Page of Honour to Queen Elizabeth II between 1985 and 1987 and became an officer in the Welsh Guards.

In 1966, Legge-Bourke's grandmother Margaret Glenusk, widowed in 1948, married secondly William Sidney, 1st Viscount De L'Isle, who had been Governor-General of Australia from 1961 until 1965. He thus became step-grandfather to the Legge-Bourke children until his death in 1991.

== Career ==
After leaving school, Legge-Bourke took a nursery teacher training course at the St Nicholas Montessori Centre in London. She then taught for a year in Balham before leaving to set up her own nursery school in Battersea, called Mrs Tiggywinkle's.

In 1993, shortly after Charles, Prince of Wales, and his wife, Diana, Princess of Wales had separated, Charles hired Legge-Bourke as nanny to their two sons. As the royal nanny, she soon began to make headlines. Early controversy came when she said scornfully of the Princess of Wales's attitude towards her sons: "I give them what they need at this stage, fresh air, a rifle and a horse. She gives them a tennis racket and a bucket of popcorn at the movies". It was also considered to be a gaffe when Legge-Bourke referred to William and Harry as "my babies".

She often went with the princes on holidays. A heavy smoker, she was said to be able to smoke even while skiing, and was criticized by Diana for smoking near her sons. In 1996, at the age of thirteen, Prince William, avoiding a difficult choice, asked both of his parents not to attend Eton's Fourth of June celebrations, the high point of the school's year. However, they were both reported to be taken aback when he invited Legge-Bourke to attend in their place.

Early in 1997, she resigned, but she returned to the royal household only a few months later. On 18 July 1997, while out of Charles's service, she attended the fiftieth-birthday party he threw for Camilla Parker Bowles in Gloucestershire.

She helped to comfort the princes after their mother's death in a road accident in Paris on 31 August 1997.

There was anger in 1998 when Legge-Bourke allowed the young princes to abseil down the fifty-metre (200 foot) dam of Grwyne Fawr Reservoir in Wales without safety lines or helmets. Staff at St James's Palace mounted an inquiry, and Legge-Bourke was reported to have been saved only by the princes' adoration of her. The press predicted time and again that Legge-Bourke was about to be sacked, but this never happened.

She finally retired from the Prince of Wales's service when she married in October 1999.

== Allegations by the Princess of Wales ==
On 9 December 1992, prime minister John Major announced in the House of Commons that Charles, Prince of Wales and Diana, Princess of Wales, were to separate but had no plans to divorce. At the time, Diana was convinced that Charles loved only Camilla Parker Bowles.

As early as October 1993, Diana was writing to Paul Burrell that she believed her husband was now in love with Legge-Bourke and wanted to marry her.

Legge-Bourke later admitted having had a "schoolgirl crush" on Charles, who had been a frequent visitor to her family's estate. Diana's biographer, Lady Colin Campbell, commented that "Charles is only interested in her as an uncle is interested in a younger niece."

On 20 November 1995, a television interview with the Princess of Wales by Martin Bashir was broadcast by the BBC. There was no mention of Legge-Bourke. However, on 24 January 1996, newspapers named Diana as the source of an untrue rumour circulated in November and December 1995 that Legge-Bourke had become pregnant by Charles and had had an abortion. The rumours were apparently spread by Bashir as a means to gain an interview with the princess. It was reported that words had been exchanged between Diana and Legge-Bourke on the matter at a party on 14 December 1995, when Diana had said to her "So sorry about the baby", and an "informed source" was quoted as saying "The Queen was absolutely furious and totally in sympathy with Tiggy." On 18 December 1995, Legge-Bourke, with the queen's agreement, instructed the libel lawyer Peter Carter-Ruck to write to Diana's solicitors demanding an apology, asking that the accusation be "recognised to be totally untrue".

On 22 January 1996, shortly before the story of the unfounded abortion allegation was published, Diana's private secretary Patrick Jephson resigned, as did his assistant Nicole Cockell the next day. Jephson later wrote that Diana had "exulted in accusing Legge-Bourke of having had an abortion".

Jealous of her sons' affection for the woman who cared for them, Diana became more hostile towards Legge-Bourke, asking that she leave the room while Diana was talking to her sons on the telephone. In February 1996, newspapers published a letter from Diana to Charles in which she asked that "Miss Legge-Bourke not spend unnecessary time in the children's rooms... read to them at night, nor supervise their bathtime."

Charles and Diana's divorce was finalized on 28 August 1996. One year later, Diana died in a road accident in Paris on 31 August 1997. Much later, Lord Stevens of Kirkwhelpington headed Operation Paget, an inquiry into the accident which reported its findings on 14 December 2006. According to the report, Diana feared that both she and Camilla Parker Bowles were the victims of a plot intended to make it possible for the Prince of Wales to marry a third woman.

As journalists digested Lord Stevens's report, they looked with a fresh eye at the conspiracy theories the report had demolished and tried to construct another out of Charles's supposed love for Legge-Bourke.

The story surfaced again when the British inquest into the deaths of Diana and Dodi Fayed began at the Royal Courts of Justice in London on 2 October 2007, headed by Lord Justice Scott Baker sitting as a coroner. On 6 October 2007, the judge was reported as telling the court that in the evidence of Lord Mishcon, Diana's solicitor, Diana had told him that "Camilla was not really Charles's lover, but a decoy for his real favourite, the nanny Tiggy Legge-Bourke".

In December 2007, witnesses at the inquest were questioned about a letter to Paul Burrell from the Princess dating from October 1993, of which only redacted versions had previously been public. In this letter, the Princess of Wales had written:

This particular phase in my life is the most dangerous – my husband is planning "an accident" in my car, brake failure and serious head injury in order to make the path clear for him to marry Tiggy. Camilla is nothing but a decoy, so we are all being used by the man in every sense of the word.

On 7 January 2008, Diana's friend Rodney Turner, giving evidence to the inquest, described his shock at seeing the contents of Diana's letter to Burrell, but on 15 January 2008, Maggie Rea, a lawyer in the firm headed by Lord Mishcon (who had died in January 2006), gave evidence to the inquest about Diana's fears to much the same effect as the letter, based on a note Mishcon had left on his file and on a meeting Rea and a colleague had had with Mishcon in October 1995.

In the so-called "Mishcon note", dating from 1995, Diana predicted that in 1996 the queen would abdicate, the prince of Wales would discard Parker Bowles in favour of Legge-Bourke, and that she would herself die in a planned road crash. Before he died, Mishcon copied the note to the Metropolitan Police, who took no action on it.

On 7 October 2007, the journalist Jasper Gerard mocked the "conspiracy theorists" promoting ever-stranger notions of the death of Diana, Princess of Wales:

There will still be folk a century on tapping their noses sagely while reading new revelations: it was Tiggy Legge-Bourke and Queen Elizabeth the Queen Mother hiding in the underpass with a flashlight and a bottle of Gordon's.

In September 2021, Legge-Bourke was offered significant damages by the BBC after an investigation into how the 1995 interview was obtained and amid reports that Martin Bashir himself had provided Diana with a faked abortion "receipt" which led Diana to believe that Legge-Bourke had become pregnant following an affair with Prince Charles.

On 21 July 2022, the BBC in a High Court public apology to Legge-Bourke, in London, stated, "The BBC accepts that the allegations made against the claimant were wholly baseless, should never have been made, and that the BBC did not, at the time, adequately investigate serious concerns over the circumstances in which the BBC secured the Panorama interview with Diana, Princess of Wales." The BBC will pay substantial damages and legal costs to the claimant.

== Marriage and children ==
In October 1999, she married Charles Pettifer, a former Coldstream Guards officer, with two sons from a previous marriage, commenting to the press "He is magic". She reportedly did not invite Camilla Parker Bowles to her wedding and Prince Charles did not attend because he had a prior engagement. Princes William and Harry attended the wedding.

Legge-Bourke and Pettifer had a brief romance while they were teenagers at school in the 1980s (she at Heathfield, he at Eton). They stayed friends while he was married to Camilla Wyatt, and Legge-Bourke was godmother to one of their sons. Until May 1997, Pettifer was company secretary and a director of Unique Security Consultants Ltd., providing former Special Air Service officers as bodyguards. He then became chief executive of Rapport Research and Analysis Ltd, supplying companies with former SAS officers for protection work.

In recent years, she has developed a farmhouse bed and breakfast business at Ty'r Chanter, near Crickhowell on the Glanusk estate, billed as "The Tiggy Experience".

In April 2006, she attended the Sovereign's Parade at Sandhurst for Prince Harry's passing out as an officer of the Blues and Royals. In November 2006, the Prince of Wales was reported to be a regular visitor to Pettifer and her family in Powys.

Tiggy and Charles Pettifer were two of the one hundred and fifty guests invited to Camilla's sixtieth birthday party on 21 July 2007. Tiggy Pettifer also attended the service of thanksgiving for the sixtieth anniversary of the wedding of Queen Elizabeth II and the Duke of Edinburgh at Westminster Abbey on 19 November 2007. Tiggy's son, Tom Pettifer was a page boy at Prince William's wedding in 2011 and the former nanny was also a special guest at Prince Harry's wedding in 2018.

On 1 January 2025, Tiggy's stepson, Edward Pettifer, was killed in the New Orleans truck attack. King Charles III and Prince William subsequently publicly expressed their condolences.

== Honours ==
Pettifer was appointed Member of the Royal Victorian Order (MVO) in the 2001 New Year Honours.

== Ancestry ==
Ancestors of Tiggy Legge-Bourke

Hon. Sir Henry Charles Legge (1852–1924), a son of William Legge, 5th Earl of Dartmouth
Lieutenant Nigel Walter Henry Legge-Bourke (1889–1914)
Amy Gwendoline Lambart (c. 1868 – 1927)
Sir Edward Alexander Henry Legge-Bourke (1914–1973)
Charles Wynn-Carington, 1st Marquess of Lincolnshire (1843–1928)
Lady Victoria Alexandrina Wynn-Carington (1892–1966)
Hon. Cecilia Margaret Harbord (1856–1934), a dau. of Charles Harbord, 5th Baron Suffield
William Nigel Henry Legge-Bourke (1939–2009)
Sir Arthur Henry Grant of Monymusk, 9th Baronet (1849–1917)
Sir Arthur Grant of Monymusk, 10th Baronet (1879–1931)
Mary, dau. of Captain H. Sholto Douglas, 42nd Highlanders
Catherine Jean Grant (1917–2007)
Collingwood Lindsay Wood, deputy lieutenant of Perthshire
Evelyn Alice Lindsay Wood (b. 1884)
Frances Charlotte Agnes Hotham, dau. of Rev. Charles George Beaumont Hotham
Alexandra Shân (Tiggy) Legge-Bourke
Joseph Bailey, 1st Baron Glanusk (1840–1906)
Joseph Bailey, 2nd Baron Glanusk (1864–1928)
Mary Ann Lucas, dau. of Henry John Lucas MD (1804–1873) of Glanyrafon, Crickhowell
Wilfred Bailey, 3rd Baron Glanusk (1891–1948)
Major Warden Sergison (1835–1888), of Cuckfield Park, Sussex
Editha Elma Sergison (1871–1938)
Emilia Gordon-Cumming, dau. of Sir William Gordon Gordon-Cumming, 2nd Baronet
Elizabeth Shân Josephine Bailey (b. 1943)
Lieutenant-Colonel H. W. Shoubridge, Indian Army
Major-General (Thomas) Herbert Shoubridge (1871–1923)
Margaret Eldrydd Shoubridge (1912–2002)
Major Herbert Dugdale, 16th Lancers
Gladys Constance Dugdale

Sources for family tree:

- Burke's Peerage, Baronetage & Knightage (107th edition, 2004)
- Who's Who and Who Was Who
- Ruvigny & Raineval, Marquis of, The Plantagenet Roll of the Blood Royal: The Anne of Exeter Volume (London: T. C. & E. C. Jack, 1907) p. 543
- Memorial Fountain, Crickhowell at web site of Public Monument and Sculpture Association's National Recording Project
- Lucas, Sir Charles Prestwood (1853–1931) in Oxford Dictionary of National Biography (Oxford University Press, 2004)
- Descendants of Henry VIII, King of England at worldroots.com
