= Charles Bateman-Hanbury-Kincaid-Lennox =

British politician (1827–1912)

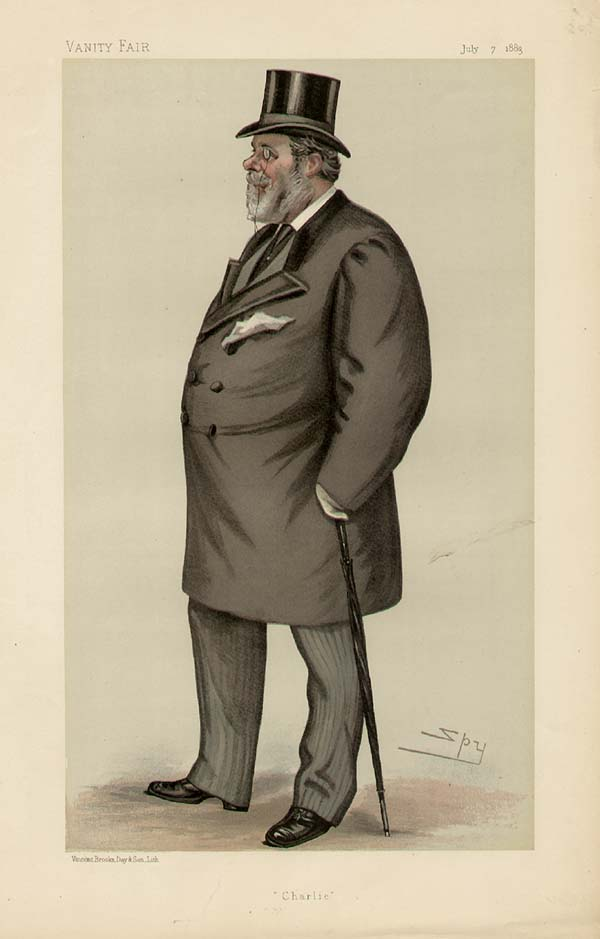
"Charlie" as caricatured by Spy (Leslie Ward) in Vanity Fair, July 1883

The Hon. Charles Spencer Bateman-Hanbury-Kincaid-Lennox (1827 – 22 March 1912), known as Charles Bateman-Hanbury until 1862, was a British Conservative Party politician.

== Background ==
Born Charles Bateman-Hanbury, he was a younger son of William Bateman-Hanbury, 1st Baron Bateman, and Elizabeth, daughter of Lord Spencer Chichester (son of Arthur Chichester, 1st Marquess of Donegall). William Bateman-Hanbury, 2nd Baron Bateman, was his elder brother.

== Political career ==
Bateman-Hanbury-Kincaid-Lennox sat as member of parliament for Herefordshire from 1852 to 1857 and for Leominster from 1858 to 1865.

== Personal life ==
Bateman-Hanbury-Kincaid-Lennox married Margaret,

On 18 June 1859 he married eldest daughter and co-heir of John Kincaid-Lennox of Woodhead and Kincaid, and widow of George Smythe, 7th Viscount Strangford. In 1862 he and his wife assumed by Royal licence the additional surnames of Kincaid-Lennox in accordance with his father-in-law's will.

He later married Rosa Cuninghame, daughter of Boyd Alexander Cuninghame and Mary Wilkinson, on 19 August 1893 at St. George Hanover Square, London, England.

He died on 22 March 1912 at Marylebone, London, England, without issue.

Parliament of the United Kingdom
| Preceded by Francis Richard Haggitt; George Cornewall Lewis; Thomas William Booker-Blakemore | Member of Parliament for Herefordshire; 1852–1857; With: Thomas William Booker-Blakemore; James King King | Succeeded by Thomas William Booker-Blakemore; James King King; Sir Geers Cotterell, Bt |
| Preceded by Gathorne Hardy; John Willoughby | Member of Parliament for Leominster; 1858–1865; With: Gathorne Hardy | Succeeded by Gathorne Hardy; Arthur Walsh |
