= Queen's Tower, Sheffield =

Historic house in Sheffield, South Yorkshire, England

Coordinates: 53.3683°N 1.4568°W

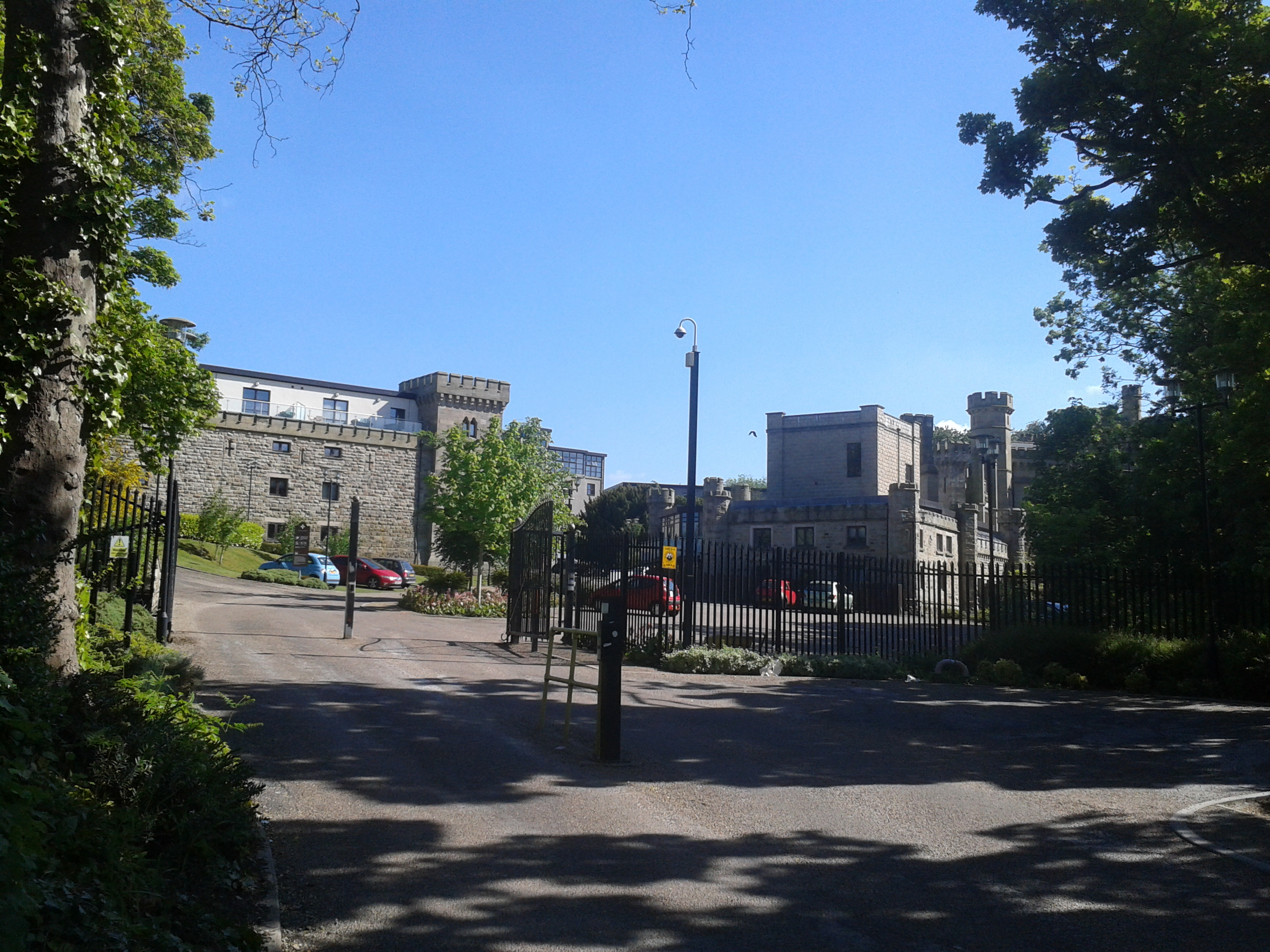
Entrance to Queen's Tower. The main house is to the right, the former stable block to the left.

Queen's Tower is a house in Sheffield, lying on Park Grange Road in the Norfolk Park area of the city. It was designed by Woodhead & Hurst for Samuel Roberts, a local cutler, as a tribute to Mary, Queen of Scots, and completed in 1839.

The two-storey building is in a Tudor style, with battlements and several turrets. Its grounds were designed by Robert Marnock and incorporated walls and a window from Manor Lodge, where Mary had been imprisoned.

On completion, Roberts gave the Tower to his son as a wedding present. He enlarged the structure in the 1860s. His descendants, who lived in the Tower for several generations, included Samuel Roberts, the Member of Parliament for Sheffield Ecclesall, and his son, also Samuel Roberts, and also a politician.

The Tower was converted to flats in 2004.
