= Lord Montagu Graham =

British politician

Lord Montagu William Graham (2 February 1807 – 21 June 1878) was a British Conservative politician.

== Background ==
Graham was a younger son of James Graham, 3rd Duke of Montrose, by his second wife Lady Caroline Maria, daughter of George Montagu, 4th Duke of Manchester. James Graham, 4th Duke of Montrose, was his elder brother.

== Political career ==
Graham was Member of Parliament (MP) for Dunbartonshire from 1830 to 1832, for Grantham from 1852 to 1857, and for Herefordshire from 1858 to 1865.

== Family ==
Graham married the Hon. Harriet Anne, daughter of William Bateman-Hanbury, 1st Baron Bateman, and widow of George Dashwood, in 1867. He died in June 1878, aged 71. His wife survived him by six years and died in April 1884.

Parliament of the United Kingdom
Preceded by John Campbell	Member of Parliament for Dunbartonshire; 1830–1832	Succeeded by John Campbell Colquhoun
Preceded by Sir Glynne Welby, Bt; Hon. Frederick Tollemache	Member of Parliament for Grantham; 1852–1857; With: Sir Glynne Welby, Bt	Succeeded by William Welby-Gregory; Hon. Frederick Tollemache
Preceded by Thomas William Booker-Blakemore; James King King	Member of Parliament for Herefordshire; 1858–1865; With: James King King 1852–1868; Sir Geers Cotterell 1857–1859; Humphrey St John-Mildmay 1859–1865	Succeeded by Michael Biddulph; James King King; Sir Joseph Bailey
