= James King King =

British politician (1806–1881)

James King King MP

Member of Parliament for Herefordshire
- In office 19 July 1852 – 23 November 1868 Serving with Joseph Bailey and Michael Biddulph (1865–1868); Humphrey Francis St John-Mildmay (1859–1865); Montagu Graham (1858–1865); Geers Cotterell (1857–1858); Charles Bateman-Hanbury and Thomas William Booker-Blakemore (1852–1857)
- Preceded by: Francis Wegg-Prosser; George Cornewall Lewis; Thomas William Booker-Blakemore
- Succeeded by: Herbert Croft; Joseph Bailey; Michael Biddulph

Personal details
- Born: 6 November 1806 Weybridge, Surrey, England
- Died: 17 June 1881 (aged 74)
- Party: Conservative
- Spouse: Mary Cochrane Mackenzie (m. 1835)
- Children: Ten
- Parent(s): James Simpkinson King; Emma Vaux
- Education: Balliol College, Oxford

James King King (6 November 1806 – 17 June 1881) was a British Conservative Party politician.

King King was the eldest son of James Simpkinson King (1767–1842) and Emma, daughter of Edward Vaux. He studied at Balliol College, Oxford, receiving a Bachelor of Arts in 1829. In 1835, he married Mary Cochrane Mackenzie, daughter of Kenneth Francis Mackenzie. She was a sister of Colin MacKenzie. Together they had three sons and seven daughters.

He was elected MP for Herefordshire in 1852 and held the seat until 1868.

King King was also a Justice of the Peace, a Deputy Lieutenant and, in 1845, High Sheriff of Herefordshire. His family seat was Stanton Park at Staunton on Arrow, where he was a major landowner and lord of the manor.

Parliament of the United Kingdom
Preceded by Francis Wegg-Prosser; George Cornewall Lewis; Thomas William Booker-Blakemore	Member of Parliament for Herefordshire; 1852–1868; With: Joseph Bailey and Michael Biddulph (1865–1868); Humphrey Francis St John-Mildmay (1859–1865); Montagu Graham (1858–1865); Geers Cotterell (1857–1858); Charles Bateman-Hanbury and Thomas William Booker-Blakemore (1852–1857)	Succeeded by Herbert Croft; Joseph Bailey; Michael Biddulph
