= Geers Cotterell =

British Whig politician

Sir Geers Cotterell Bt DL JP

Member of Parliament for Herefordshire
- In office 4 April 1857 – 2 May 1859 Serving with James King King; Montagu Graham; Thomas William Booker-Blakemore
- Preceded by: James King King, Charles Bateman-Hanbury, Thomas William Booker-Blakemore
- Succeeded by: James King King; Humphrey Francis St John-Mildmay; Montagu Graham

Personal details
- Born: Geers Henry Cotterell; 22 August 1834
- Died: 17 March 1900 (aged 65) Hertford Street, Mayfair
- Party: Whig
- Spouse: Katherine Margaret Airey (m. 1865; died 1896)
- Children: 3, including John Richard Geers Cotterell
- Parent(s): John Henry Cotterell; Pyne Jesse Trevor
- Education: Harrow School
- Alma mater: Christ Church, Oxford

Sir Geers Henry Cotterell, 3rd Baronet (22 August 1834 – 17 March 1900) was a Whig politician.

== Early life ==
Cotterell was the second son of Sir John Henry Cotterell (who had died before his birth and was heir apparent to Sir John Cotterell, 1st Baronet) and Hon. Pyne Jesse Trevor, daughter of Henry Trevor, 21st Baron Dacre and Pyne Crosbie. After his father's death, his mother married Granville Harcourt Vernon, MP, son of Most Rev. Edward Venables-Vernon-Harcourt and Lady Anne Leveson-Gower, in 1845.

He was educated at Harrow School and Christ Church, Oxford, and succeeded to the Baronetage of Garnons on 17 February 1847, upon the death of his brother John Henry Cotterell.

== Career ==
Cotterell was elected Whig MP for Herefordshire at the 1857 general election and held the seat until 1859, when he stood down.

Outside of politics, Cotterell was High Sheriff of Herefordshire in 1863, as well as a Deputy Lieutenant and a Justice of the Peace for the same county.

== Personal life ==
He married in 1865 Honorable Katherine Margaret Airey, daughter of Richard Airey, 1st Baron Airey, and Harriet Mary Evard Talbot. The Hon. Lady Cotterell died in 1896. They had at least three children:

- John Richard Geers Cotterell (1866–1937), who married Lady Evelyn Gordon-Lennox, daughter of Charles Gordon-Lennox, 7th Duke of Richmond, in 1896.
- Alice Cotterell (d. 1924), who died unmarried.
- Louisa Cotterell

Cotterell died in Hertford Street, Mayfair, on 17 March 1900 and was succeeded in the baronetcy by his son, John.

Parliament of the United Kingdom
Preceded by James King King; Charles Bateman-Hanbury; Thomas William Booker-Blakemore	Member of Parliament for Herefordshire; 1857–1859; With: James King King (1857–1859); Montagu Graham (1858–1859); Thomas William Booker-Blakemore (1857–1858)	Succeeded by James King King; Humphrey Francis St John-Mildmay; Montagu Graham
Baronetage of the United Kingdom
Preceded by John Henry Cotterell	Baronet (of Garnons); 1847 – 1900	Succeeded by John Richard Geers Cotterell
