= 1908 Ross by-election =

UK Parliamentary by-election

The 1908 Ross by-election was held on 31 January 1908. The by-election was held due to the death of the incumbent Liberal MP, Alan Coulstoun Gardner. It was won by the Liberal Unionist candidate and previous MP for Ross Percy Clive.

Ross by-election, 1908
Party	Candidate	Votes	%	±%
Liberal Unionist	Percy Clive	4,947	55.7	+7.5
Liberal	Frederick Whitley-Thomson	3,928	44.3	−7.5
Majority		1,019	11.4	N/A
Turnout		8,875	84.6	+1.1
Liberal Unionist gain from Liberal		Swing	+7.5	
