= Baron Glanusk =

Title in the Peerage of the United Kingdom

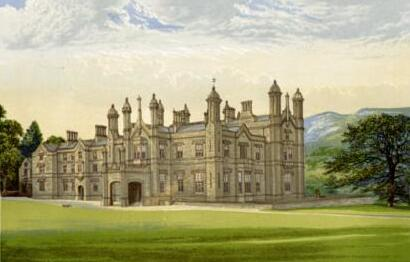
Glanusk Park, the seat of the Bailey family

Baron Glanusk, of Glanusk Park in the County of Brecknock, is a title in the Peerage of the United Kingdom. It was created in 1899 for Sir Joseph Bailey, 2nd Baronet, who had earlier represented Herefordshire and Hereford in the House of Commons as a Conservative. Both his son, the second Baron, and grandson, the third Baron, served as Lord Lieutenant of Brecknockshire. The latter was succeeded by his first cousin, the fourth Baron. He was the son of the Hon. Herbert Crawshay Bailey, fourth son of the first Baron. As of 2010 the titles are held by his son, the fifth Baron, who succeeded in 1997.

The Bailey baronetcy, of Glanusk Park in the County of Brecon, was created in the Baronetage of the United Kingdom in 1852 for Joseph Bailey, an English ironmaster and Member of Parliament for Worcester and Breconshire. He was succeeded by his grandson, the aforementioned second Baronet, who was elevated to the peerage in 1899. The Hon. Bernard M. Bailey, son of the 2nd Baronet, died at the Battle of Jutland whilst serving as a midshipman on HMS Defence, aged 17.

The family residence of the Bailey family was Glanusk Park, which was left by the 3rd Baron Glanusk in 1948 to his daughter Shân Legge-Bourke.

== Bailey baronets, of Glanusk Park (1852) ==
- Sir Joseph Bailey, 1st Baronet (1783–1858)
  - Joseph Bailey (1812–1850)
- Sir Joseph Russell Bailey, 2nd Baronet (1840–1906) (created Baron Glanusk in 1899)

=== Baron Glanusk (1899) ===
- Joseph Russell Bailey, 1st Baron Glanusk (1840–1906)
- Joseph Henry Russell Bailey, 2nd Baron Glanusk (1864–1928)
- Wilfred Russell Bailey, 3rd Baron Glanusk (1891–1948)
- David Russell Bailey, 4th Baron Glanusk (1917–1997)
- Christopher Russell Bailey, 5th Baron Glanusk (born 1942)

The heir apparent is the present holder's son, Hon. Charles Henry Bailey (born 1976).

=== Title succession chart ===
Title succession chart, Bailey baronets and Barons Glanusk

Bailey baronetcy
Sir Joseph Bailey; 1st Baronet; 1783–1858
Joseph Bailey; 1812–1850
Baron Glanusk
Joseph Bailey; 1st Baron Glanusk; 2nd Baronet; 1840–1906
William Bailey; 1863–1863	Joseph Bailey; 2nd Baron Glanusk; 1864–1928	Maj. Hon. William Bailey; 1867–1942	Hon. Arthur Bailey; 1868–1929	Hon. Herbert Bailey; 1871–1936
Wilfred Bailey; 3rd Baron Glanusk; 1891–1948	Hon. Gerald Bailey; 1893–1915	Hon. Bernard Bailey; 1899–1916	David Bailey; 4th Baron Glanusk; 1917–1997
Christopher Bailey; 5th Baron Glanusk born 1942
Hon. Charles Bailey born 1976

== Coat of arms ==
Coat of arms of Baron Glanusk
Notes Coat of arms of Baron Glanusk Coronet A coronet of a Baron Crest A Griffin sejant Argent semy of Annulets Gules Escutcheon Argent between two Bars three Annulets in fess Gules between as many Martlets of the last Supporters Dexter: a Collier proper; Sinister: a Smith proper Motto Libertas (Liberty)
