= Ross (constituency) =

Parliamentary constituency in the United Kingdom, 1885–1918

- Former county constituency for the House of Commons
- County: Herefordshire
- Major settlements: Ross-on-Wye

1885–1918
- Seats: One
- Created from: Herefordshire
- Replaced by: Hereford

Ross, or the Southern division of Herefordshire was a county constituency centred on the town of Ross-on-Wye in Herefordshire. It returned one Member of Parliament (MP) to the House of Commons of the Parliament of the United Kingdom, elected by the first past the post voting system.

The constituency was created under the Redistribution of Seats Act 1885 for the 1885 general election, when the three-seat Herefordshire constituency was replaced by two single-member county divisions: the Leominster (or Northern) division, and the Ross (or Southern) division.

Ross was abolished for the 1918 general election.

== Boundaries ==
The Sessional Divisions of Dore, Harewood's Ends, Hereford, Ledbury and Ross and the Municipal Borough of Hereford.

== Members of Parliament ==
| Election | Member | Party |
|---|---|---|
| 1885 | Michael Biddulph | Liberal |
| 1886 | Michael Biddulph | Liberal Unionist |
| 1900 | Percy Clive | Liberal Unionist |
| 1906 | Alan Coulston Gardner | Liberal |
| 1908 by-election | Percy Clive | Liberal Unionist |
| 1912 | Percy Clive | Unionist |
| May 1918 by-election | Charles Pulley | Unionist |
| Dec. 1918 | constituency abolished | |

== Elections ==
| Decades: | 1880s; 1890s; 1900s; 1910s |

=== Elections in the 1880s ===
General election 1885: Ross
| Party | Candidate | Votes | % | ±% |
|---|---|---|---|---|
| Liberal | Michael Biddulph | 4,415 | 54.8 | |
| Conservative | Joseph Bailey | 3,643 | 45.2 | |
| Majority | | 772 | 9.6 | |
| Turnout | | 8,058 | 79.2 | |
| Registered electors | | 10,179 | | |
| Liberal win (new seat) | | | | |

General election 1886: Ross
| Party | Candidate | Votes | % | ±% |
|---|---|---|---|---|
| Liberal Unionist | Michael Biddulph | 3,968 | 70.4 | +25.2 |
| Liberal | Thomas Duckham | 1,670 | 29.6 | −25.2 |
| Majority | | 2,298 | 40.8 | N/A |
| Turnout | | 5,638 | 55.4 | −23.8 |
| Registered electors | | 10,179 | | |
| Liberal Unionist gain from Liberal | | Swing | +25.2 | |

=== Elections in the 1890s ===
General election 1892: Ross
| Party | Candidate | Votes | % | ±% |
|---|---|---|---|---|
| Liberal Unionist | Michael Biddulph | 4,326 | 52.8 | −17.6 |
| Liberal | Joseph Pulley | 3,869 | 47.2 | +17.6 |
| Majority | | 457 | 5.6 | −35.2 |
| Turnout | | 8,195 | 74.7 | +19.3 |
| Registered electors | | 10,968 | | |
| Liberal Unionist hold | | Swing | +17.6 | |

General election 1895: Ross
| Party | Candidate | Votes | % | ±% |
|---|---|---|---|---|
| Liberal Unionist | Michael Biddulph | 4,573 | 61.8 | +9.0 |
| Liberal | Arthur Withy | 2,828 | 38.2 | −9.0 |
| Majority | | 1,745 | 23.6 | +18.0 |
| Turnout | | 7,401 | 65.8 | −8.9 |
| Registered electors | | 11,249 | | |
| Liberal Unionist hold | | Swing | +9.0 | |

=== Elections in the 1900s ===
General election 1900: Ross
| Party | Candidate | Votes | % | ±% |
|---|---|---|---|---|
| Liberal Unionist | Percy Clive | Unopposed | | |
| Liberal Unionist hold | | | | |

General election 1906: Ross
| Party | Candidate | Votes | % | ±% |
|---|---|---|---|---|
| Liberal | Alan Coulston Gardner | 4,497 | 51.8 | New |
| Liberal Unionist | Percy Clive | 4,185 | 48.2 | N/A |
| Majority | | 312 | 3.6 | N/A |
| Turnout | | 8,682 | 83.5 | N/A |
| Registered electors | | 10,394 | | |
| Liberal gain from Liberal Unionist | | Swing | N/A | |

1908 Ross by-election
| Party | Candidate | Votes | % | ±% |
|---|---|---|---|---|
| Liberal Unionist | Percy Clive | 4,947 | 55.7 | +7.5 |
| Liberal | Frederick Whitley-Thomson | 3,928 | 44.3 | −7.5 |
| Majority | | 1,019 | 11.4 | N/A |
| Turnout | | 8,875 | 84.6 | +1.1 |
| Registered electors | | 10,486 | | |
| Liberal Unionist gain from Liberal | | Swing | +7.5 | |

=== Elections in the 1910s ===
Webb

General election January 1910: Ross
| Party | Candidate | Votes | % | ±% |
|---|---|---|---|---|
| Liberal Unionist | Percy Clive | 5,073 | 52.0 | +3.8 |
| Liberal | Henry Webb | 4,678 | 48.0 | −3.8 |
| Majority | | 395 | 4.0 | N/A |
| Turnout | | 9,751 | 89.1 | +5.6 |
| Registered electors | | 10,946 | | |
| Liberal Unionist gain from Liberal | | Swing | -3.7 | |

General election December 1910: Ross
| Party | Candidate | Votes | % | ±% |
|---|---|---|---|---|
| Liberal Unionist | Percy Clive | 4,748 | 50.6 | −1.4 |
| Liberal | Henry Webb | 4,627 | 49.4 | +1.4 |
| Majority | | 121 | 1.2 | −2.8 |
| Turnout | | 9,375 | 85.6 | −3.5 |
| Registered electors | | 10,946 | | |
| Liberal Unionist hold | | Swing | -1.4 | |

General Election 1914–15:

Another General Election was required to take place before the end of 1915. The political parties had been making preparations for an election to take place and by July 1914, the following candidates had been selected;

- Unionist: Percy Clive
- Liberal: Clement Woodbine Parish

1918 Ross by-election
| Party | Candidate | Votes | % | ±% |
|---|---|---|---|---|
| Unionist | Charles Pulley | 3,260 | 64.6 | +14.0 |
| NFU | T. Percy Preece | 1,784 | 35.4 | New |
| Majority | | 1,476 | 29.2 | +28.0 |
| Turnout | | 5,044 | 44.2 | −41.4 |
| Unionist hold | | Swing | -1.4 | |
