= Thomas Duckham =

British politician

Thomas Duckham (26 September 1816 – 2 March 1902) was an English farmer, cattle breeder and Liberal politician.

Duckham was the second son of John Duckham of Shirehampton, Bristol and was educated at private schools at Bristol and Hereford. He was a tenant farmer at Baysham Court, near Ross and was a stock breeder of pedigree of Hereford cattle. In partnership with Thomas Treherne, he built St Nicholas Church and the city gaol, in Gaol Street, Hereford. He founded the Central and Associated Chambers of Agriculture of which he became chairman in 1883. He was also a member of the Councils of Central Chamber of Agriculture at Bath and west of England and of the Herefordshire Agricultural Society. For twenty years he edited the Hereford Herd Book. He became JP for Herefordshire.

In 1880 Duckham was elected Member of Parliament for Herefordshire. The seat was replaced under the Redistribution of Seats Act 1885 and in 1885 he was elected MP for Leominster which he held until 1886. He was an alderman of Herefordshire County Council from 1888 and a member of the Ross Board of guardians. He was also chairman of the Ross Highway Board for 15 years.

Duckham died at his residence at Holmer, Herefordshire 2 March 1902, at the age of 85.

Duckham married a widow, Mrs. Anne Yeomans, in 1845. Anne Yeomans (née Morgan) had first been married to John Yeomans (1803–1842) of Moreton, another noted breeder of Hereford cattle, and whose family features strongly in the history of the Hereford breed. He was the son of Richard Yeomans (1767–1833) and grandson of John Yeomans (1736–1798) of Howton Court. Anne Duckham, late Yeomans née Morgan, died in 1894. She was the mother of Thomas Duckham's daughter, Ellen.

Parliament of the United Kingdom
Preceded by Daniel Peploe; Sir Joseph Bailey; Michael Biddulph	Member of Parliament for Herefordshire; 1880 – 1885; With: Sir Joseph Bailey; Michael Biddulph	Constituency divided see Leominster and Ross
Preceded by James Rankin	Member of Parliament for Leominster; 1885 – 1886	Succeeded by Sir James Rankin
