= John Rumney Nicholson =

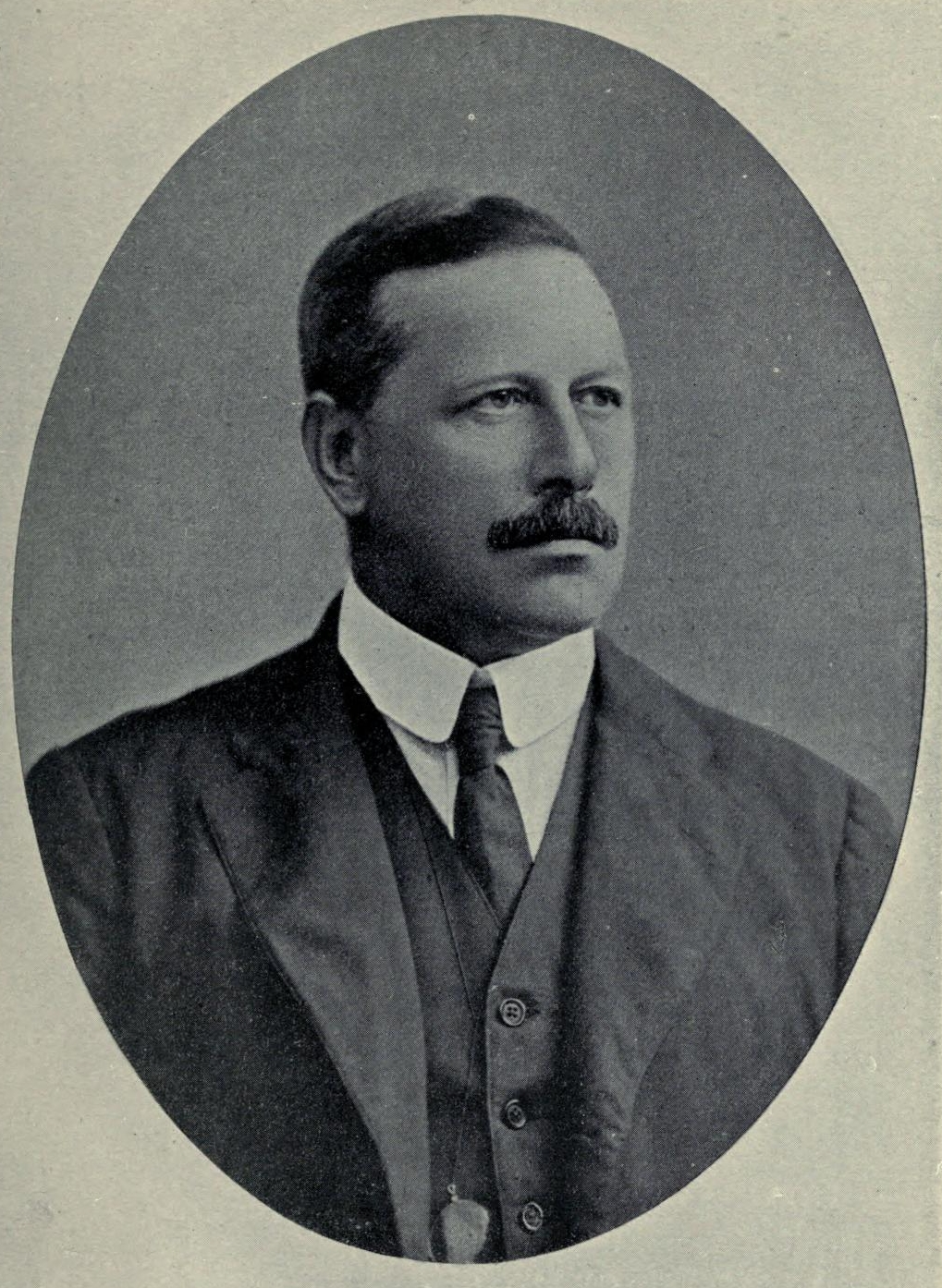

Sir John Rumney Nicholson, CMG (25 March 1866 – 22 November 1939) was a British engineer.

== Biography ==
Nicholson was born at Langwathby in 1866, the son of Isaac Nicholson, (Note: His father is mostly listed as Isaac Nicholson, but the marriage announcement had T. Nicholson and the Penrith Observer article had John Nicholson.) and was educated at St Bees School. His family was stated to be from Bolton, Cumbria. He entered the works of Black, Hawthorn and Co. in Gateshead in 1883. He was resident engineer in charge of the erection of the first generating station of the Newcastle Electric Supply Company at Pandon Dene in 1889. He then went to Venezuela, and returned to London in 1894 to join P. W. and C. S. Meek consulting engineers, and was engaged on dock and railway undertakings, including at the Port Talbot docks. From there he went to Ellesmere Works at Worsley, near Manchester.

After his marriage in 1902, he moved with his wife to Singapore, where he was engaged as managing director of the Tanjong Pagar Dock Company, and on its nationalization by the government in 1905 became chairman and chief engineer of the new Singapore Harbour Board. For his service in Singapore, he was appointed a Companion of the Order of St Michael and St George (CMG) in the 1913 Birthday Honours list, and knighted in the 1919 Birthday Honours list.

He returned to the United Kingdom in 1918, and after working a year on government work in France, was appointed chief engineer for docks on the North Eastern Railway in 1919. Following the formation of the London and North Eastern Railway group (LNER) in 1923, he continued as chief engineer for docks of the North-Eastern area. He retired late 1927.

He died on 1939 at his home Red House, Underskiddaw, near Keswick, Cumbria.

== Family ==
Nicholson married at the parish church in Lugwardine on 24 September 1902 to Sybil Helen Croft, daughter of Sir Herbert Croft, 9th Baronet. Lady Nicholson was an Officer of the Order of the British Empire (OBE). They had one son and one daughter.
