= Michael Biddulph, 1st Baron Biddulph =

British banker and Member of Parliament

The Right Honourable The Lord Biddulph JP DL
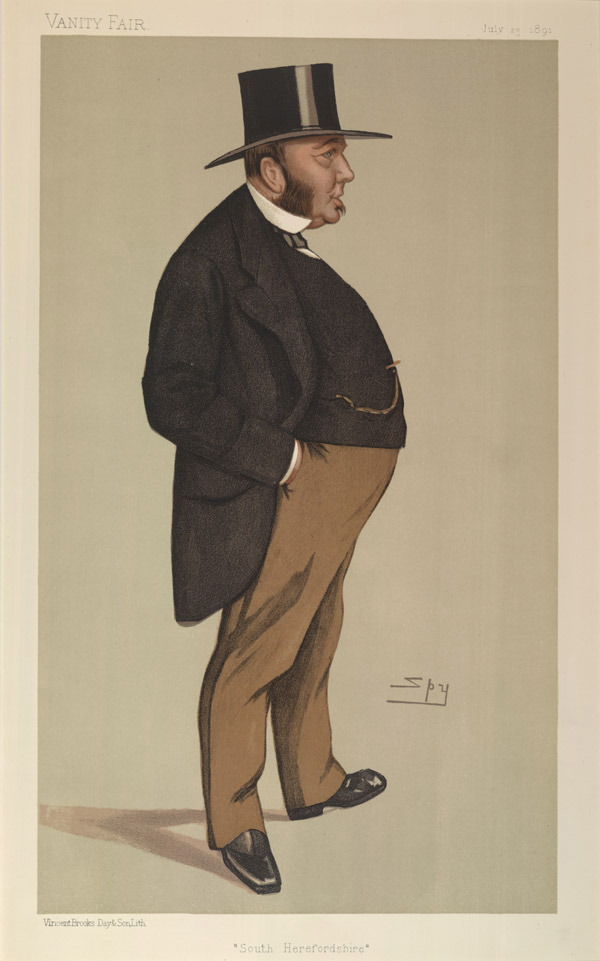
- "South Herefordshire". Caricature by "Spy" (Leslie Ward) published in Vanity Fair in 1891.

Member of Parliament for Ross
- In office 1885–1900
- Preceded by: New constituency
- Succeeded by: Percy Clive

Member of Parliament for Herefordshire
- In office 1865–1880 Serving with James King King, Sir John Bailey, Sir Herbert Croft, Daniel Peploe Peploe, Thomas Duckham
- Preceded by: James King King; Lord Montagu Graham; Humphrey Francis St John-Mildmay
- Succeeded by: Constituency abolished

Personal details
- Born: Michael Biddulph; 17 February 1834
- Died: 6 April 1923 (aged 89)
- Party: Liberal; Liberal Unionist
- Spouses: Adelaide Georgiana Peel (m. 1864; died 1872) Lady Elizabeth Adeane (m. 1877; died 1916)
- Parent(s): Robert Biddulph; Elizabeth Palmer
- Education: Harrow School

Michael Biddulph, 1st Baron Biddulph JP DL (17 February 1834 – 6 April 1923), was a British banker and Liberal, later Liberal Unionist, Member of Parliament (MP).

== Early life ==
Biddulph was the eldest son of Robert Biddulph and his wife Elizabeth (née Palmer), daughter of George Palmer MP, of Nazeing Park in Essex. Among his siblings was Sir Robert Biddulph, a General in the Army, Colonel John Biddulph, who served in India, and George Tournay Biddulph, who also worked for the family banking firm. After his mother's death, his father married his second cousin, Lady Sarah Wilfreda Palmer, daughter of Earl Selborne and they lived at Douglas House, Petersham.

Biddulph was educated at Harrow.

== Career ==
He was a partner in the London banking firm of Cocks, Biddulph and Co. In 1865 he was elected to the House of Commons for Herefordshire, a seat he held until 1885, and then represented Ross between 1886 and 1900. At first a Liberal, he disagreed with William Ewart Gladstone on the issue of Irish Home Rule and sat as a Liberal Unionist after 1886. Biddulph was also a Justice of the Peace for Herefordshire and Gloucestershire and served as Deputy Lieutenant of Herefordshire. In 1903 he was raised to the peerage as Baron Biddulph, of Ledbury in the County of Hereford.

== Personal life ==
On 9 August 1864, Biddulph married, firstly, Adelaide Georgiana Peel (d. 1872), the second daughter of General Jonathan Peel MP (fifth son Sir Robert Peel, 1st Baronet) and Lady Alicia Jane Kennedy (a daughter of Archibald Kennedy, 1st Marquess of Ailsa), in 1864. They had two sons and three daughters, including:

- John Michael Gordon, 2nd Baron Biddulph (1869–1949), who married Marjorie Caroline Susan Mure, third daughter of Lt.-Col. William Mure MP, and Constance Elizabeth Wyndham (fourth daughter of George Wyndham, 1st Baron Leconfield) in 1896.
- Claud William Biddulph (1871–1954), who married his second cousin once removed Margaret Howard, the only daughter of Alfred John Howard of Warton Hall, and Mary Alice Kennedy, in 1906.
- Adela Margaret Mary Biddulph (d. 1876), who died young.
- Edith Mary Biddulph (d. 1939), who married Charles Wentworth Bell of Bronsil (d. 1929), in 1891.
- Violet Maud Biddulph (d. 1960).

After her death in 1872 he married, secondly, Lady Elizabeth Philippa (née Yorke) Adeane, widow of Henry John Adeane MP for Cambridgeshire, in 1877. Lady Elizabeth was the eldest daughter of Charles Yorke, 4th Earl of Hardwicke, and Susan Liddell (sixth daughter of Thomas Liddell, 1st Baron Ravensworth). They had no children.

Lady Biddulh died on 13 January 1916. Lord Biddulph died in April 1923, aged 89, and was succeeded in the barony by his eldest son from his first marriage, John. Lady Biddulph died in 1916, aged 81.

== Arms ==
Coat of arms of Michael Biddulph, 1st Baron Biddulph
| Crest A wolf salient Argent charged on the shoulder with a trefoil slipped Gules. Escutcheon Vert an eagle displayed Argent armed and langued Gules a canton of the second. Supporters On either side a wolf Argent semée of trefoils slipped Gules. Motto Sublimiora Petamus (Let Us Aim At Loftier Things) |

Parliament of the United Kingdom
| Preceded by James King King; Lord Montagu Graham; Humphrey Francis St John-Mildmay | Member of Parliament for Herefordshire; 1865–1880; With: James King King 1865–1868; Sir John Bailey 1865–1885; Sir Herbert Croft 1868–1874; Daniel Peploe Peploe 1874–1880; Thomas Duckham 1880–1885 | Constituency abolished |
| New constituency | Member of Parliament for Ross; 1885–1900 | Succeeded by Percy Clive |
Peerage of the United Kingdom
| New creation | Baron Biddulph; 1903–1923 | Succeeded by John Michael Gordon |
