= Ellis Ashmead-Bartlett (politician) =

American-born British politician (1849–1902)

Sir Ellis Ashmead-Bartlett
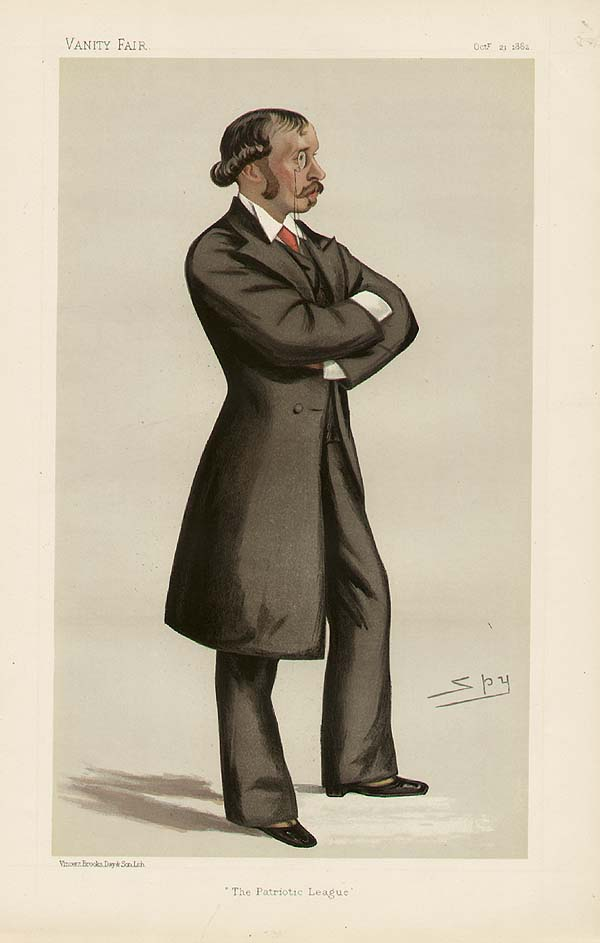
- "The Patriotic League"; Ashmead-Bartlett as caricatured by Spy (Leslie Ward) in Vanity Fair, October 1882

Member of Parliament for Eye
- In office 1880–1885
- Preceded by: George Barrington
- Succeeded by: Francis Seymour Stevenson

Member of Parliament for Sheffield Ecclesall
- In office 1885–1902
- Preceded by: New creation
- Succeeded by: Samuel Roberts

Personal details
- Born: 24 August 1849 Brooklyn, New York City, United States
- Died: 18 January 1902 (aged 52) London, United Kingdom
- Party: Conservative
- Spouse: Frances Christina Walsh
- Education: Christ Church, Oxford

Sir Ellis Ashmead-Bartlett (24 August 1849 – 18 January 1902) was an American-born British Conservative politician who sat in the House of Commons from 1880 to 1902.

== Early life ==
Ellis Ashmead-Bartlett was born in Brooklyn, New York, to Ellis Bartlett of Plymouth, Massachusetts, and Sophia Ashmead of Philadelphia. He was the elder brother of William Burdett-Coutts, and, through their father, they claimed to be descended from Richard Warren, one of the passengers on the Mayflower.

Shortly after the death of his father in 1852 his mother moved the family to England, where he went to school at Torquay, before entering Christ Church, Oxford in 1867 (after a short time at St Mary Hall, Oxford). He graduated with first class honours in Law and History in 1871, and was called to the bar in 1877. While at Christ Church he was a keen athlete and won the silver medal at the 1870 AAC Championships.

He was for a while one of HM's Inspectors of Schools.

== Politics ==
Ashmead-Bartlett was elected as Member of Parliament (MP) for Eye, Suffolk, in the 1880 general election. In 1882 his caricature by "Spy" was published in the British weekly magazine Vanity Fair (21 October 1882) under the title "The Patriotic League". The Eye constituency was redefined under the Redistribution of Seats Act 1885, and in the general election of 1885 he ran for, and won, Sheffield Ecclesall constituency, which he held until his death in 1902. He served as Civil Lord of the Admiralty in the governments of Lord Salisbury from 1885 to February 1886 and August 1886 to 1892. He was knighted in the 1892 Dissolution Honours.

During the 1890s Ashmead-Bartlett championed the cause of Swaziland against the administration of the South African Republic. In late 1899, during the Second Anglo-Boer War, he travelled to South Africa to lobby the British Commander, Lord Roberts, for a position. In March Lord Roberts sent him to Swaziland to meet the Queen Regent. During this meeting the Queen Regent requested British protection for Swaziland. It is unclear if he initiated this request.

== Personal life ==
In 1874 he married Frances Christina Walsh. His eldest son by this marriage, Ellis Ashmead-Bartlett, was a war correspondent who became famous for his reporting of the Battle of Gallipoli.

Parliament of the United Kingdom
Preceded by The Viscount Barrington	Member of Parliament for Eye; 1880–1885	Succeeded by Francis Seymour Stevenson
New constituency	Member of Parliament for Sheffield Ecclesall; 1885–1902	Succeeded by Samuel Roberts
Party political offices
Preceded by Lord Claud Hamilton	Chairman of the National Union of Conservative and Constitutional Associations; 1886–1888	Succeeded by Sir Albert Kaye Rollit
