= William Renny Watson =

British engineer and businessman

Sir William Renny Watson (1838 – 7 April 1900) was a British engineer and businessman in Glasgow.

== Life ==
Watson was born in 1838, the only son of Thomas Watson, of Hawick. The family was a well-known border family.

He was educated at the Grammar school, Kelso, and became an engineer, later a director of the Mirrlees, Watson and Yaryan Company. In 1874 he was living in Jamaica, when he registered a patent together with James Buchanan Mirrlees.

A prominent citizen of Glasgow, he was chairman of the Glasgow and South Western Railway Company, director of the National Bank of Scotland, and chairman of the Governor of the Victoria Infirmary of Glasgow. He received a knighthood in the 1892 Dissolution Honours, following the general election that year, and was knighted by Queen Victoria at Windsor Castle on 2 December 1892.

Watson married, in 1866, Mary Anne Caird (1840–1926), daughter of Edward Caird, of Finnart, Dunbartonshire. Lady Watson died in 1926.

He died at Edinburgh on 7 February 1900.
