= Humphrey Francis St John-Mildmay =

British Liberal and Whig politician, and merchant banker

Member of Parliament for Herefordshire
- In office 2 May 1859 – 19 July 1865 Serving with James King King; Montagu Graham
- Preceded by: James King King; Geers Cotterell; Montagu Graham
- Succeeded by: James King King; Joseph Bailey; Michael Biddulph

Personal details
- Born: 25 December 1825
- Died: 29 November 1866 (aged 40)
- Party: Liberal
- Other political affiliations: Whig
- Spouse: Sybella Harriet Clive (m. 1861)
- Parent(s): Humphrey St John-Mildmay; Anne Eugenia Baring

Humphrey Francis St John-Mildmay (25 December 1825 – 29 November 1866) was a British Liberal and Whig politician, and merchant banker.

St John-Mildmay was the son of Humphrey St John-Mildmay and Anne Eugenia Baring, daughter of Alexander Baring and Anne Louise née Bingham. In June 1861, he married Sybella Harriet Clive, daughter of George Clive and Ann Sybella Martha née Farquhar, but they had no children.

After unsuccessfully contesting Maidstone as a Whig at the 1857 general election, St John Mildmay was elected Liberal MP for Herefordshire at the 1859 general election and held the seat until 1865, when he stood down.

Parliament of the United Kingdom
Preceded by James King King; Geers Cotterell; Montagu Graham	Member of Parliament for Herefordshire; 1859–1865; With: James King King; Montagu Graham	Succeeded by James King King; Joseph Bailey; Michael Biddulph
