= Joseph Bailey, 2nd Baron Glanusk =

British Army officer and peer (1864–1928)

The Right Honourable The Lord Glanusk CB CBE DSO
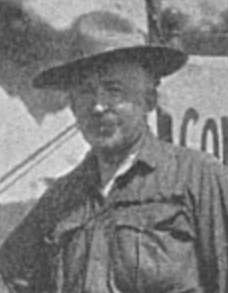
- Bailey in 1913

Member of the House of Lords
- Lord Temporal
- In office 6 January 1906 – 11 January 1928
- Preceded by: The 1st Baron Glanusk
- Succeeded by: The 3rd Baron Glanusk

Personal details
- Born: Joseph Henry Russell Bailey; 26 October 1864
- Died: 11 January 1928 (aged 63)

Joseph Henry Russell Bailey, 2nd Baron Glanusk (26 October 1864 – 11 January 1928), was a British Army officer and peer.

== Early life ==
Bailey was the eldest surviving son of Sir Joseph Bailey, 2nd Baronet, who was created Baron Glanusk in 1899. He succeeded his father in both titles in 1906.

== Military career ==
On 7 February 1885, in the same class as Douglas Haig, Walter Congreve and Sydney Lawford, Bailey was commissioned as a lieutenant in the Grenadier Guards from the Royal Military College, Sandhurst, and he was promoted captain on 11 November 1896. After the outbreak of the Second Boer War in October 1899, a corps of imperial volunteers from London was formed in late December 1899. The corps included infantry, mounted infantry and artillery divisions and was authorized with the name City of London Imperial Volunteers. It proceeded to South Africa in January 1900, returned in October the same year, and was disbanded in December 1900. Captain Bailey was appointed as Adjutant to the infantry division on 3 January 1900, with the temporary rank of Major in the Army, and served as such until the corps was disbanded. He was promoted to the substantive rank of major on 29 November 1900, and awarded a Distinguished Service Order (DSO) for his services in South Africa later the same year. After his return to the United Kingdom, he was on 1 June 1901 appointed to command the Guards' depot at Caterham, Surrey, serving as such until 28 February 1903.

He retired from the Grenadier Guards in 1903, and became Lieutenant-Colonel commanding the part-time 3rd (Royal South Wales Borderers Militia) Battalion, South Wales Borderers, on 9 April 1904. After he succeeded to the barony, he was also appointed to succeed his father as Honorary Colonel of the 1st (Brecknockshire) Volunteer Battalion, South Wales Borderers, on 1 June 1907. In a most unusual arrangement, he was later appointed the active commanding officer of the battalion (now the Brecknockshire Battalion in the Territorial Force) on 20 March 1912. On the outbreak of World War I he mobilised the battalion at Brecon and commanded it when it was deployed to Aden in December 1914. Having been appointed a CB in 1911, he was also made a CBE in 1919 at the end of the war.

== Other roles ==
He was appointed a deputy lieutenant of Breconshire in March 1887, and succeeded his father in the appointment as Lord Lieutenant of Breconshire in 1905, a post he held until his death.

== Family ==
Bailey married, in 1890, Editha Elma Sergison, daughter of Major Warden Sergison, and they had the following children:

- Hon. Wilfred Russell Bailey, born 27 June 1891, major, Grenadier Guards, served in World War I
- Hon. Gerald Sergison Bailey, born 22 November 1893, lieutenant, Grenadier Guards, killed in action 10 August 1915
- Hon. Dulsie Editha Bailey, born 23 November 1896, married 12 May 1922 Captain Alastair Robertson Cooper, Royal Scots Greys
- Hon. Bernard Michael Bailey, born 17 January 1899, midshipman, Royal Navy, killed in action at the Battle of Jutland 31 May 1916

== Death ==
Despite suffering ill-health in his later years, Bailey campaigned extensively for the establishment of the Brecon War Memorial Hospital. On 11 January 1928, the hospital was opened by Bailey, when he gave the following speech;

It is in humble gratitude I thank Almighty God, the Architect of the Universe, that he has permitted me to live to see this day. It is a great day for all of us.

No sooner he had finished the sentence, Bailey staggered back and grasped his chair before turning to the Bishop of Swansea (who was also present at the opening), asserting "Just hold me up, please", after which he held his heart and collapsed into the chair. Two doctors who were present at the opening took Bailey into the hospital which moments prior he had been in the process of opening, while his son, Wilfred, continued the speech. Once the speech was concluded, the doctors emerged from the hospital with the announcement that not eight minutes after he had begun his speech, Lord Glanusk had died. He was 63.

Bailey was succeeded in his title by his son, Wilfred Bailey, having passed the estates to him some time prior. Lady Glanusk died in 1938.

== Coat of arms ==
Coat of arms of Joseph Bailey, 2nd Baron Glanusk
Notes Coat of arms of Baron Glanusk Coronet A coronet of a Baron Crest A Griffin sejant Argent semy of Annulets Gules Escutcheon Argent between two Bars three Annulets in fess Gules between as many Martlets of the last Supporters Dexter: a Collier proper; Sinister: a Smith proper Motto Libertas (Liberty)

== Sources ==
- Burke's Peerage, Baronetage and Knightage, 100th Edn, London, 1953.
- Kidd, Charles, Williamson, David (editors). Debrett's Peerage and Baronetage (1990 edition). New York: St Martin's Press, 1990.
- Leigh Rayment's Peerage Pages

Honorary titles
Preceded by The 1st Baron Glanusk	Lord Lieutenant of Brecknockshire; 1905–1928	Succeeded by The 3rd Baron Glanusk
Peerage of the United Kingdom
Preceded by Joseph Bailey	Baron Glanusk; 1906–1928; Member of the House of Lords (1906–1928)	Succeeded by Wilfred Bailey
Baronetage of the United Kingdom
Preceded by Joseph Bailey	Baronet of Glanusk Park; 1906–1928	Succeeded by Wilfred Bailey
