= Charles Pulley =

British politician

Member of Parliament for Hereford
- In office 1918-1921

Member of Parliament for Ross
- In office 1918

High Sheriff of Herefordshire
- In office 1912

Personal details
- Born: 24 July 1864 Cork, Ireland
- Died: 5 April 1947 (aged 82) Lower Eaton, Hereford, England
- Party: Conservative
- Spouse: Irva Hopkins (m. 1906; died 1942)
- Education: King's College London

Sir Charles Thornton Pulley (24 July 1864 – 5 April 1947) was a British racehorse owner and breeder, a member of the London Stock Exchange and Conservative Party politician.

== Biography ==
Pulley was born in Cork on 24 July 1864 and educated at King's College School and King's College London. He was later a member of the London Stock Exchange.

In 1912 he was appointed High Sheriff of Herefordshire. Pulley was elected as the Member of Parliament (MP) for Ross at a by-election in May 1918, and held the seat until it was abolished at the general election in December 1918. He was then elected as the Coalition Conservative MP for Hereford.

He was appointed a deputy lieutenant of Herefordshire on 15 January 1919, and resigned from the House of Commons on 22 December 1920.

Pulley was a bloodstock breeder and horses from his stud at Lower Eaton won 460 races. He was appointed a Knight Bachelor in 1922

Pulley had married Iva Hopkins in 1906, she died in 1942 and they had no children. Pulley died at Lower Eaton, Hereford on 5 Apr 1947 aged 82.

Parliament of the United Kingdom
Preceded by Percy Archer Clive	Member of Parliament for Ross; 1918 – December 1918	Constituency abolished
Preceded by William Hewins	Member of Parliament for Hereford; 1918 – 1920	Succeeded by Samuel Roberts
