= Albert Harland =

British politician (1869–1957)

Albert Harland (6 September 1869 – 25 February 1957) was a British Conservative Party politician.

After studying at Temple Grove in East Sheen, Rugby School and Corpus Christi College, Cambridge, Harland moved to Sheffield, where he set up as a snuff manufacturer.

In 1902, he was elected to Sheffield County Borough Council, serving until 1911. In 1923, he was re-elected to the council, and also as the member of parliament for Sheffield Ecclesall. He stood down from the council but held the Parliamentary seat in 1924. In 1929, Harland moved to stand for Sheffield Hillsborough, but was unable to gain the seat. He was elected to the council for a third period, serving on this occasion until 1936.

Parliament of the United Kingdom
Preceded by Samuel Roberts (1st)	Member of Parliament for Sheffield Ecclesall; 1923–1929	Succeeded by Samuel Roberts (2nd)
