= Institut Alpin Videmanette =

Former finishing school in Rougemont, Switzerland

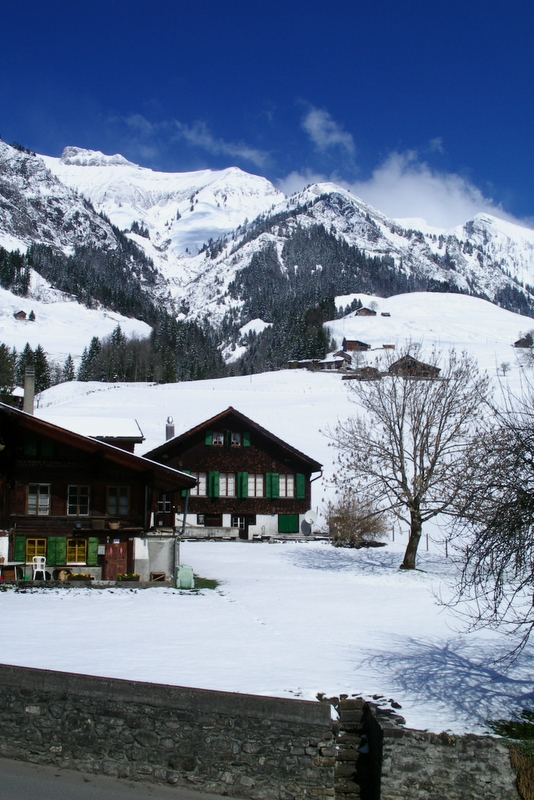
- Château-d'Œx

Information
- School type: Finishing school
- Gender: Girls
- Language: French

The Institut Alpin Videmanette was a finishing school in the municipality of Rougemont, Switzerland. It was an all-girl school where the lessons were skiing, cooking, dressmaking and French.

In 1973, the school was headed by Monsieur and Madame C. L. Yersin. In 1981, it was reported to have an age range between sixteen and twenty and to teach language and commercial programmes through the medium of the French language.

The main facilities were in Château d'Œx.

Tamara Mellon was at the school in the mid-1980s, when it had some sixty girls and was still headed by Madame Yersin. She later wrote of it that "The assumption was that you were a dunce and that the only hope for you was to attach yourself to what was known as a good provider." In her day there was a smoking room and in the winter months there were skiing lessons every afternoon. Girls would often meet boys from Le Rosey at a nightclub in Gstaad. The winter campus of Le Rosey was nearby.

The school closed in 1991.

== Alumnae ==
- Diana, Princess of Wales: 1977 to 1978.
- Hayley Mills
- Princess Irene of Greece and Denmark
- Alexandra "Tiggy" Legge-Bourke
- Tamara Mellon
