= 1918 Ross by-election =

UK Parliamentary by-election

The 1918 Ross by-election was held on 4 May 1918. The by-election was held due to the incumbent Conservative MP, Percy Clive, being killed in action in the First World War. It was won by the Conservative candidate Charles Pulley.

Ross by-election, 1918
Party	Candidate	Votes	%	±%
Unionist	Charles Pulley	3,260	64.6	+14.0
National Farmers Union	T. Percy Preece	1,784	35.4	New
Majority		1,476	29.2	+28.0
Turnout		5,044	44.2	−41.4
Unionist hold		Swing	-1.4	
