= Hertford Street =

Street in central London, England

Coordinates: 51.50618°N 0.14869°W

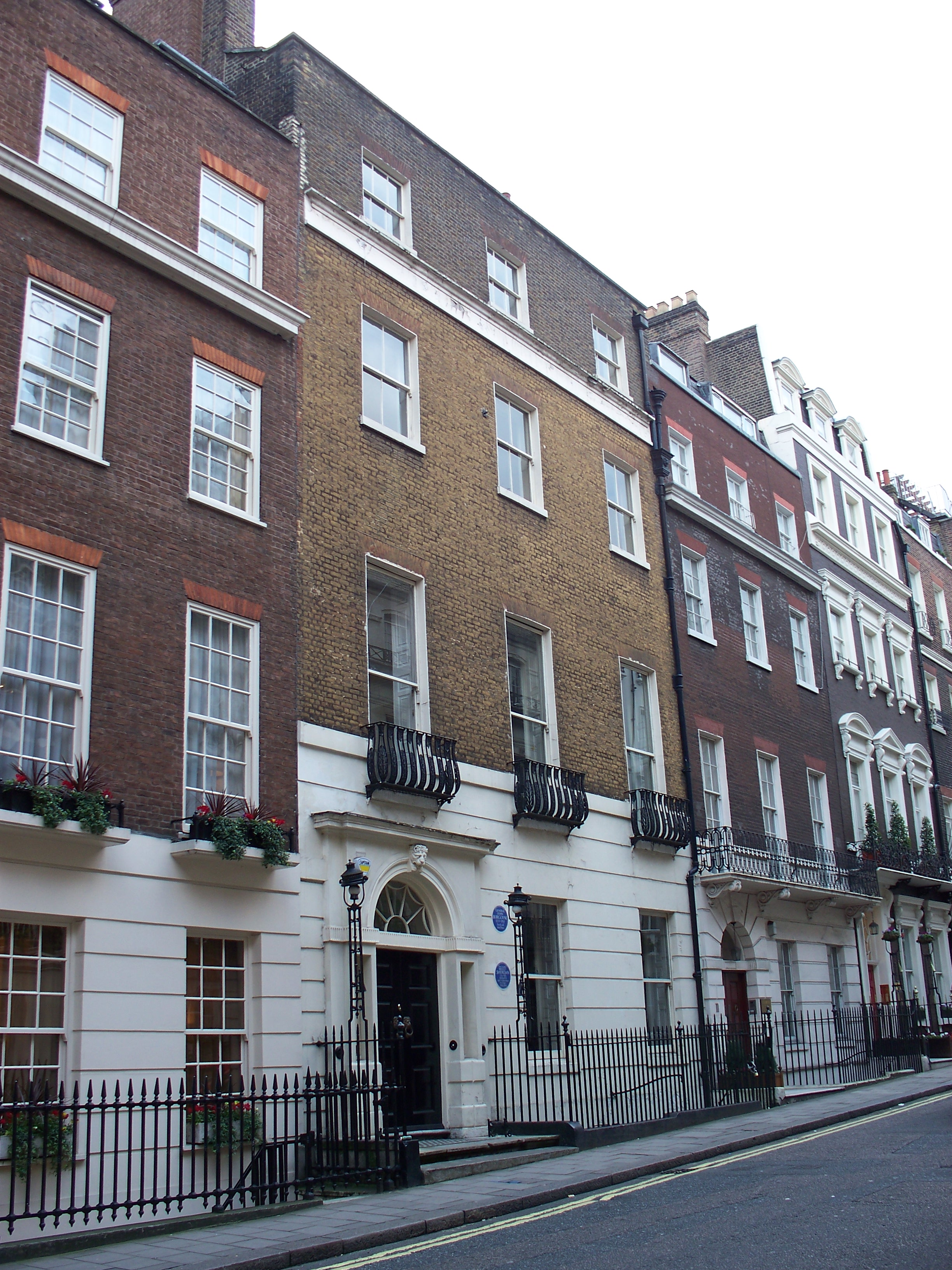
10 Hertford Street, home of General John Burgoyne

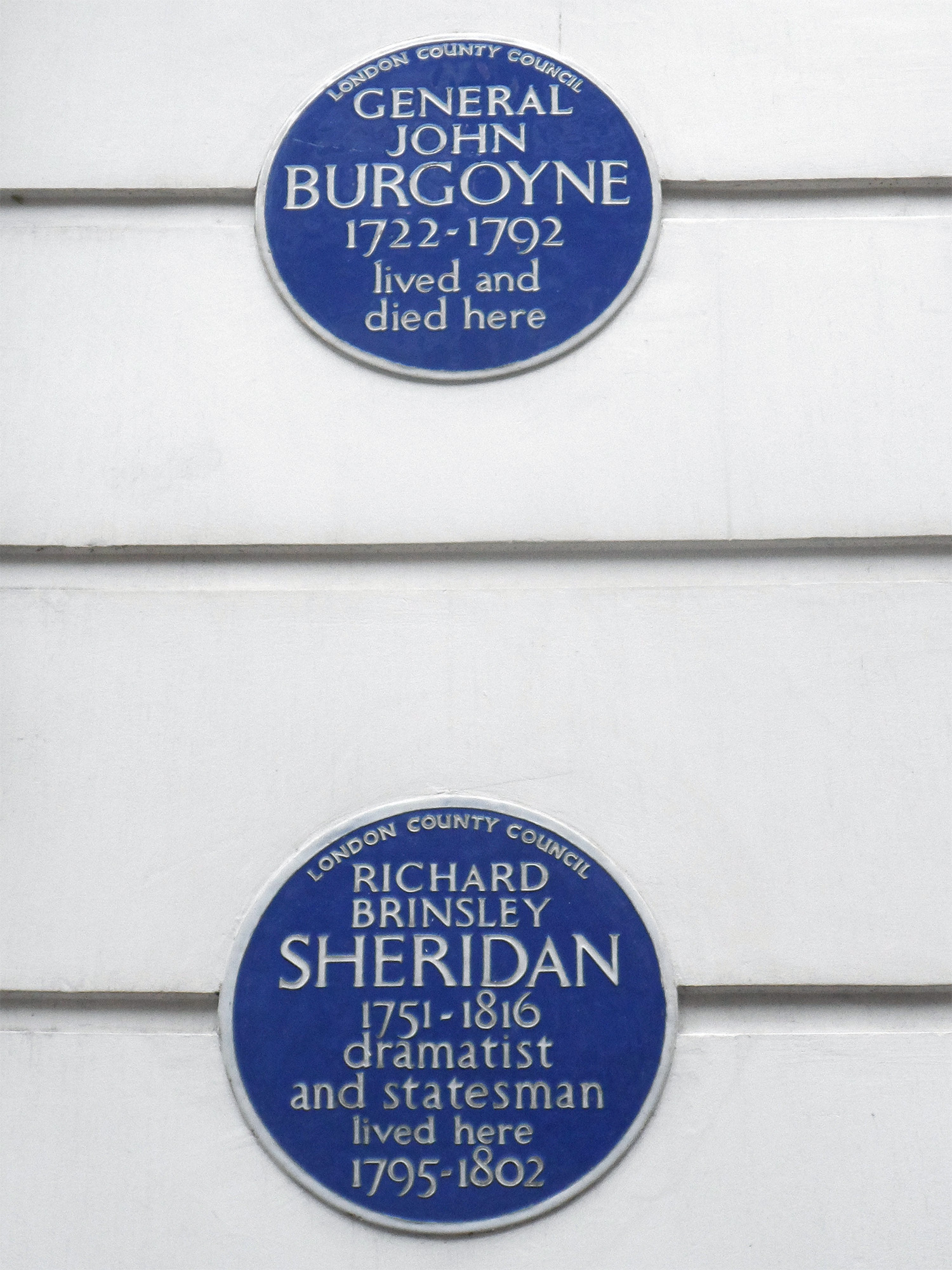
Sheridan and Burgoyne blue plaques at no. 10

Hertford Street is a street in central London's Mayfair district. It runs between a junction with Park Lane and Old Park Lane at its western end, to Curzon Street at its north-east end.

In 1771, Anne, Duchess of Cumberland and Strathearn married Prince Henry, Duke of Cumberland and Strathearn in Hertford Street on 2 October 1771.

In 1880, the Royal Society of Painter-Printmakers was established at 38 Hertford Street, as the Society of Painter-Etchers, for the promotion of original etching as a creative art form. This building was the London studios of Radio Luxembourg, from 1952 until 1990.

Notable business include 5 Hertford Street, a private members' club. Previously a cafe, between 1950s and 1970, called the Magna Cafe owned by Giovanni Magnavacca and family. Sold to Tiddy Dolls, the restaurant next door in 1973. There is a painting of the scene by David Shepherd.

The Embassy of Thailand, London has its Commercial Attaché at 11 Hertford Street. The Embassy of Qatar, London has its Cultural and Military Section at 21 Hertford Street. The Embassy of Panama, London is at 40 Hertford Street.

== Notable residents ==
- General John Burgoyne (1723–1792), lived and died at no. 10
- Sir Geers Cotterell, 3rd Baronet, died there in 1900
- The mathematician James Joseph Sylvester (1814–1897), died at no. 5
- Sir Charles Richard Vaughan (1774–1849), diplomat, died there in 1849
- In 1783, Capability Brown, the gardener and landscape architect, died at number 6, home to his son-in-law, the architect Henry Holland and his daughter Bridget Holland.
