= 1921 Hereford by-election =

UK Parliamentary by-election

← 1918	11 January 1921	1922 →
Candidate	Roberts	Langford
Party	Unionist	Liberal
Popular vote	9,670	7,411
Percentage	56.6%	43.4%
MP before election
Pulley
Unionist
Subsequent MP
Roberts
Unionist

The 1921 Hereford by-election was held on 11 January 1921. The by-election was held due to the resignation of the incumbent Coalition Unionist MP, Charles Pulley. It was won by the Coalition Unionist candidate Samuel Roberts.

Hereford by-election, 1921
Party		Candidate	Votes	%	±%
C	Unionist	Samuel Roberts	9,670	56.6	−19.2
	Liberal	Ernest Wilfred Langford	7,411	43.4	New
Majority			2,259	12.2	−38.4
Turnout			17,081	62.5	+7.9
C indicates candidate endorsed by the coalition government.
