= 1902 Sheffield Ecclesall by-election =

UK Parliamentary by-election

The 1902 Sheffield Ecclesall by-election was a parliamentary by-election held on 3 February 1902 for the British House of Commons constituency of Sheffield Ecclesall. It was caused by the death of the sitting member Ellis Ashmead-Bartlett, of the Conservative Party. The candidates were Samuel Roberts (Conservative) and Reginald F. Vaile (Liberal).

The by-election was won by Samuel Roberts of the Conservative Party.

== Result ==
1902 Sheffield Ecclesall by-election
Party	Candidate	Votes	%	±%
Conservative	Samuel Roberts	5,231	55.9	−5.1
Liberal	Reginald F. Vaile	4,119	44.1	+5.1
Majority		1,112	11.8	−10.2
Turnout		9,350	74.8	+1.8
Registered electors		12,501		
Conservative hold		Swing	−5.1	
