= Sir Samuel Roberts, 2nd Baronet =

Samuel Roberts MP

Member of Parliament for Sheffield Ecclesall
- In office 30 May 1929 – 25 October 1935
- Preceded by: Albert Harland
- Succeeded by: Geoffrey Ellis

Member of Parliament for Hereford
- In office 11 January 1921 – 10 May 1929
- Preceded by: Charles Pulley
- Succeeded by: Frank Owen

Personal details
- Born: Samuel Roberts
- Education: Harrow School; Trinity College, Cambridge

Sir Samuel Roberts, 2nd Baronet JP (2 September 1882 – 13 December 1955) was a British politician.

Son of the Sheffield Ecclesall MP Samuel Roberts, Roberts grew up at Queen's Tower in Norfolk Park, Sheffield. He attended Harrow School and Trinity College, Cambridge, before becoming a solicitor.

In 1913, Roberts became a justice of the peace, and in 1919, the Lord Mayor of Sheffield. In 1921, he was elected as the Conservative Party MP for Hereford, and at the 1929 general election he switched to represent his father's former constituency of Sheffield Ecclesall. He stood down at the 1935 general election, serving that year as the Master Cutler.

Parliament of the United Kingdom
Preceded by Charles Pulley	Member of Parliament for Hereford; 1921 – 1929	Succeeded by Frank Owen
Preceded by Albert Harland	Member of Parliament for Sheffield Ecclesall; 1929 – 1935	Succeeded by Robert Ellis
Baronetage of the United Kingdom
Preceded by Samuel Roberts	Baronet (of Ecclesall and Queen's Tower); 1926–1955	Succeeded by Peter Roberts
