= Wilfred Bailey, 3rd Baron Glanusk =

British peer and soldier (1891–1948)

The Right Honourable The Lord Glanusk DSO & Bar

Member of the House of Lords
- Lord Temporal
- In office 11 January 1928 – 12 January 1948
- Preceded by: The 2nd Baron Glanusk
- Succeeded by: The 4th Baron Glanusk

Personal details
- Born: Wilfred Russell Bailey; 27 June 1891
- Died: 12 January 1948 (aged 56)
- Spouses: Victoria Dugdale (m. 1919; div. 1939) Margaret Shoubridge (m. 1942)
- Children: Dame Shân Legge-Bourke

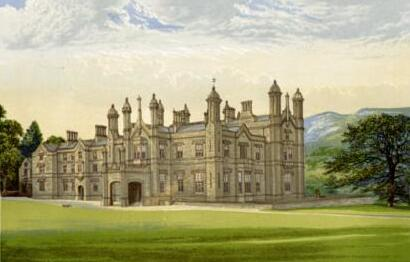
Glanusk Park, the seat of the Bailey family

Wilfred Russell Bailey, 3rd Baron Glanusk (27 June 1891 – 12 January 1948), was a British peer and soldier.

== Career ==
Glanusk was the son of Joseph Bailey, 2nd Baron Glanusk, born on 17 June 1891. He followed his father into the Grenadier Guards and served in World War I, being wounded twice, mentioned in dispatches, and awarded the DSO and Bar and the French Croix de guerre. He reached the rank of major.

He succeeded his father as third Baron on 11 January 1928, and also followed him as Lord Lieutenant of Brecknockshire and Honorary Colonel of the 3rd (Brecknockshire & Monmouthshire) Battalion, Monmouthshire Regiment, in the Territorial Army.

He served again in World War II, as lieutenant-colonel of the Welsh Guards 1939–1942, and then as a colonel at General Headquarters, Home Forces. After the war, he continued as Honorary Colonel of 638th (Brecknock) Light Anti-Aircraft Regiment, Royal Artillery, successors to the 3rd Battalion Monmouths.

== Family ==
On 27 February 1919, while still the Hon. Wilfred Bailey, Glanusk married firstly Victoria Mary Enid Ann Dugdale, a daughter of Frank Dugdale and Eva Sarah Louise Greville. They were divorced in 1939. On 17 March 1942 he married secondly Margaret Eldrydd Shoubridge, daughter of Herbert Shoubridge. They had a daughter, the Elizabeth Shân Josephine Bailey.

Glanusk died on 12 January 1948, aged 56, and having no son was succeeded in his peerage by a first cousin, David Russell Bailey.

Glanusk left his ancestral home and estate of Glanusk Park to his daughter, who in 1998 became Lord Lieutenant of Powys.

In 1966, Glanusk's widow married William Sidney, 1st Viscount De L'Isle, recently returned from serving as Governor-General of Australia. She died in 2002.

== Coat of arms ==
Coat of arms of Wilfred Bailey, 3rd Baron Glanusk
Notes Coat of arms of Baron Glanusk Coronet A coronet of a Baron Crest A Griffin sejant Argent semy of Annulets Gules Escutcheon Argent between two Bars three Annulets in fess Gules between as many Martlets of the last Supporters Dexter: A Collier proper; Sinister: A Smith proper Motto Libertas (Liberty)

== Notes ==
Honorary titles
Preceded by The 2nd Baron Glanusk	Lord Lieutenant of Brecknockshire; 1928–1948	Succeeded by Sir Geoffrey Raikes
Peerage of the United Kingdom
Preceded by Joseph Bailey	Baron Glanusk; 1928–1948; Member of the House of Lords (1928–1948)	Succeeded by David Bailey
Baronetage of the United Kingdom
Preceded by Joseph Bailey	Baronet of Glanusk Park; 1928–1948	Succeeded by David Bailey
