= 1892 Dissolution Honours =

British government recognitions

The 1892 Dissolution Honours List was issued in August 1892 following the general election of that year.

The recipients of honours are displayed as they were styled before their new honour.

== Earl and Marquess ==
- The Right Honourable Lawrence, Earl of Zetland, by the names, styles, and titles of Earl of Ronaldshay, in the county of Orkney and Zetland, and Marquess of Zetland

== Baron and Earl ==
- The Right Honourable Gathorne, Viscount Cranbrook GCSI by the names, styles, and titles of Baron Medway, of Hemsted in the county of Kent, and Earl of Cranbrook in the said county

== Earl ==
- The Right Honourable Gilbert Henry, Baron Willoughby de Eresby, by the name, style, and title of Earl of Ancaster in the county of Lincoln

== Baron ==
- William Amhurst Tyssen-Amherst, by the name, style, and title of Baron Amherst of Hackney, in the county of London
- Sir Thomas Brooks Bt by the name, style, and title of Baron Crawshaw, of Crawshaw, in the County Palatine of Lancaster, and of Whatton, in the county of Leicester
- Sir Archibald Campbell Campbell Bt by the name, style, and title of Baron Blythswood, of Blythswood, in the county of Renfrew
- The Right Honourable George Cubitt, by the name, style, and title of Baron Ashcombe, of Dorking, in the county of Surrey, and of Bodiam Castle, in the county of Sussex
- Sir Rainald Knightley Bt by the name, style, and title of Baron Knightley, of Fawsley, in the county of Northampton
- William John Legh, by the name, style, and title of Baron Newton, of Newton-in-Makerfield, in the County Palatine of Lancaster
- John Mulholland, by the name, style, and title of Baron Dunleath, of Ballywalter, in the county of Down
- John Allan Rolls, by the name, style, and title of Baron Llangattock, of the Heudre, in the county of Monmouth

== Privy Councillor ==
The Queen appointed the following to Her Majesty's Most Honourable Privy Council:

- The Right Honourable Christopher Palles, Lord Chief Baron of the Court of Exchequer in Ireland
- Sir Matthew White Ridley Bt MP
- Jesse Collings MP
- Alexander Staveley Hill QC MP
- Thomas Henry Huxley DCL

== Baronets ==
- Captain G. C. Armstrong
- Edward Hamer Carbutt
- Frederick Dixon Dixon-Hartland MP
- Colonel Charles Hamilton
- Frederick Seager Hunt MP
- Horace Townsend Farquhar
- John Jaffray
- Edward Levy-Lawson
- Thomas Lea MP
- John Muir, Lord Provost of Glasgow
- Baron von Schröder
- Mark John Stewart MP Honorary Colonel of the 1st Ayrshire and Galloway Volunteer Artillery
- The Right Honourable George Osborne Morgan QC

== Knight Bachelor ==
- Ellis Ashmead-Bartlett MP
- John Blundell Maple MP
- George Irwin, JP for Leeds
- John Benjamin Stone
- Dr. William Smith DCL
- Douglas Straight
- Joseph Henry Warner, Grocer's Company
- William Renny Watson, Chairman of the Glasgow South-Western Railway Company
