= Glanusk Park =

Welsh country estate

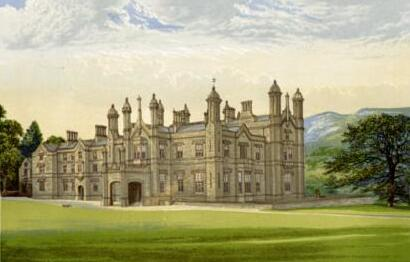
- Engraving of Glanusk Park, circa 1880
- Interactive map of the Glanusk Park area

General information
- Location: Crickhowell, Powys, Wales
- Coordinates: 51.869°N 3.172°W
- Completed: 1826
- Demolished: 1952
- Client: Sir Joseph Bailey

Glanusk Park (Welsh: Parc Glanwysg) is a country estate in Wales, United Kingdom, situated near the town of Crickhowell, Powys and was established in 1826 by ironmaster Sir Joseph Bailey. The park features in the hereditary title Baron Glanusk which was given to Sir Joseph's grandson, Sir Joseph Bailey in 1899 who at that time was the Lord Lieutenant of Brecknockshire. The park and estate contains 20,000 acres (8,100 ha) of common land, 3,500 acres (1,400 ha) of farmland, 29 let residential properties, 7 let farms and a five-mile (8 km) stretch of the River Usk. There are 400 acres (160 ha) of private parkland and 800 acres (320 ha) of forest which also includes a collection of over 200 different species of oak trees.

Glanusk Park and Estate is privately owned by the Legge-Bourke family. It is situated in the countryside of the Usk Valley, South Wales in the Brecon Beacons National Park, and is one of the largest privately owned estates in Wales. The Victorian gardens and parkland are listed at Grade II* on the Cadw/ICOMOS Register of Parks and Gardens of Special Historic Interest in Wales.

== History ==
Joseph Bailey and his brother, Crawshay Bailey, had made a fortune working for their uncle, Richard Crawshay, who owned the Cyfarthfa Ironworks near Merthyr Tydfil. Joseph had bought estates in Brecknockshire, Radnorshire, Herefordshire, and Glamorganshire, including the estate of Glanusk Park in 1826.

The mansion that was built by the founder was demolished in 1952, due to fire damage which took place during the Army's requisition of the building.

The family still live in the Dower house (Penmyarth) within the estate grounds. Numerous other buildings are acknowledged as of either grade II or grade III architectural importance. These include the Tower Bridge, the Stable Yard, numerous farm buildings dating from 1826 and a private chapel. Some Celtic standing stones are also within the estate.

Crickhowell & Penmyarth Golf Club (now defunct) was founded in 1897 and played on a course at Glanusk Park. The club and course disappeared in the late 1960s.

== 21st century ==
Glanusk has become a well-established and diversified country estate with farming, private residential, commercial, sporting, wedding and holiday-let interests. There is a pheasant and partridge shoot, and salmon and trout fishing. The estate is also a premier events venue which hosts, amongst others, the annual Green Man Festival and has previously been the site of Welsh Polo, Glanusk International Horse Trials and a number of smaller events and charitable functions including the annual NGS Open Garden and Estate Fair and Fun Ride.

Shân Legge-Bourke, Lord Lieutenant of Powys and a lady-in-waiting to The Princess Royal, is the (present) owner of the Glanusk estate. She is the daughter of Wilfred Bailey who was the third Baron Glanusk. Her daughter Tiggy Legge-Bourke, nanny to Prince William and his brother Prince Harry, grew up at Glanusk and still lives on the estate.

In 2021, Channel 4 filmed Handmade: Britain's Best Woodworker, in the workshop within the estate. It is a carpentry challenge show hosted by Mel Giedroyc. It is known as Good with Wood in USA and Canada.

== Wildlife poisoning ==
In 2013, fifteen poisoned birds of prey, and five poisoned pheasants likely used as bait, were found on the outer estate grounds in what was reported as the "most significant wildlife poisoning case ever recorded in Wales". The birds were poisoned with Bendiocarb and the birds were discovered "on a forested area of the outer estate grounds". A police investigation resulted in two arrests, but the Crown Prosecution Service advised that there was insufficient evidence for a prosecution.

== A murder ==
In 1876, Glanusk was the scene of a murder when the estate's gamekeeper, George King, was shot whilst he and his under-keeper, Philip Hooper, were trying to apprehend poachers. No one was ever convicted for this crime. He left a widow, Eliza, and eight children. There is a "King's Wood" which is said to be named after George. The man who was tried and acquitted for the murder was forced to emigrate to America where it is said he received confirmation of a deathbed confession from South Wales.
