= Sir Samuel Roberts, 1st Baronet =

British politician and businessman

Sir Samuel Roberts 1st Baronet, PC, DL
- Born: 30 April 1852; Sheffield, West Riding of Yorkshire, England
- Died: 19 June 1926 (aged 74)
- Education: Repton School, Trinity College, Cambridge; Inner Temple
- Occupations: politician, businessman
- Known for: Lord Mayor of Sheffield (1900), MP (1902–1923)
- Notable work: director of Cammell Laird and National Provincial Bank
- Political party: Conservative
- Spouse: Martha Susan Blakeney (m. 1880)
- Children: at least 1 son Samuel
- Father: Samuel Roberts

Sir Samuel Roberts, 1st Baronet PC, DL (30 April 1852 – 19 June 1926) was a British politician and businessman.

== Biography ==
Roberts was the son of Samuel Roberts, of Sheffield. A descendant of the Samuel Roberts who built Queen's Tower in Norfolk Park, Roberts grew up in the building and attended Repton School, Trinity College, Cambridge, and then Inner Temple, becoming a barrister in 1877.

He became a director of Cammell Laird and of the National Provincial Bank, and was in business in Sheffield. In 1900, he was the Lord Mayor of Sheffield. At the 1900 general election he stood unsuccessfully for the Conservative Party in High Peak, but was elected at the Sheffield Ecclesall by-election in February 1902. He was knighted in 1917 and made a Baronet in 1919. Becoming a Privy Councillor in 1922 under the Conservative Government, he stepped down from Parliament at the 1923 general election.

He was also a member of the Wanderers amateur football club.

== Family ==
Roberts married, 21 December 1880, Martha Susan Blakeney, only daughter of Venerable John Edward Blakeney, Archdeacon of Sheffield. Their son, also Samuel Roberts, was a later MP for Sheffield Ecclesall.

Parliament of the United Kingdom
Preceded by Ellis Ashmead-Bartlett	Member of Parliament for Sheffield Ecclesall; 1902–1923	Succeeded by Albert Harland
Baronetage of the United Kingdom
New creation	Baronet (of Ecclesall and Queen's Tower); 1919–1926	Succeeded by Samuel Roberts
