= Percy Clive =

British Army officer and politician (1873–1918)

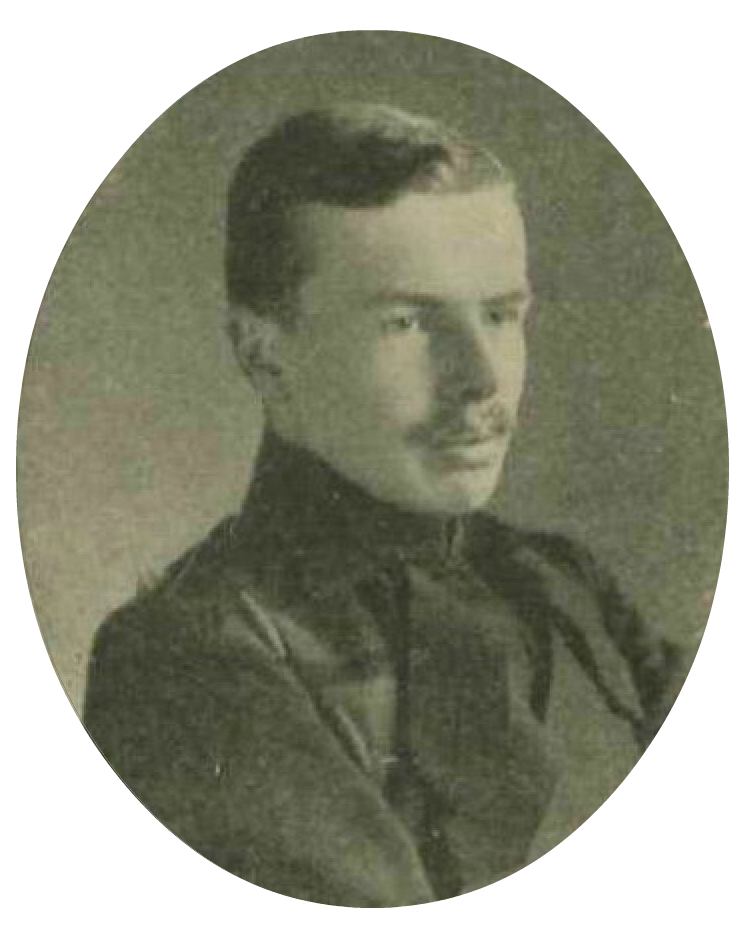
- Photograph in The Illustrated London News following Clive's 1900 election as an MP

Member of Parliament for Ross
- In office 1900–1906; 1908–1918

Personal details
- Born: 13 March 1873 Whitfield, Herefordshire, England
- Died: 5 April 1918 Bucquoy, France
- Party: Conservative (after 1912); Liberal Unionist Party (until 1912)
- Children: 2+, including Meysey and Lewis
- Relatives: William Feilding (grandfather)
- Education: Royal Military College, Sandhurst
- Military career
- Allegiance: United Kingdom
- Rank: Captain
- Units: Grenadier Guards; Niger Field Force; Lancashire Fusiliers
- Conflicts: Second Boer War; World War I
- Awards: Legion of Honour; Croix de Guerre

Percy Archer Clive, DL (13 March 1873 – 5 April 1918) was a British army officer and Liberal Unionist Party politician.

== Biography ==
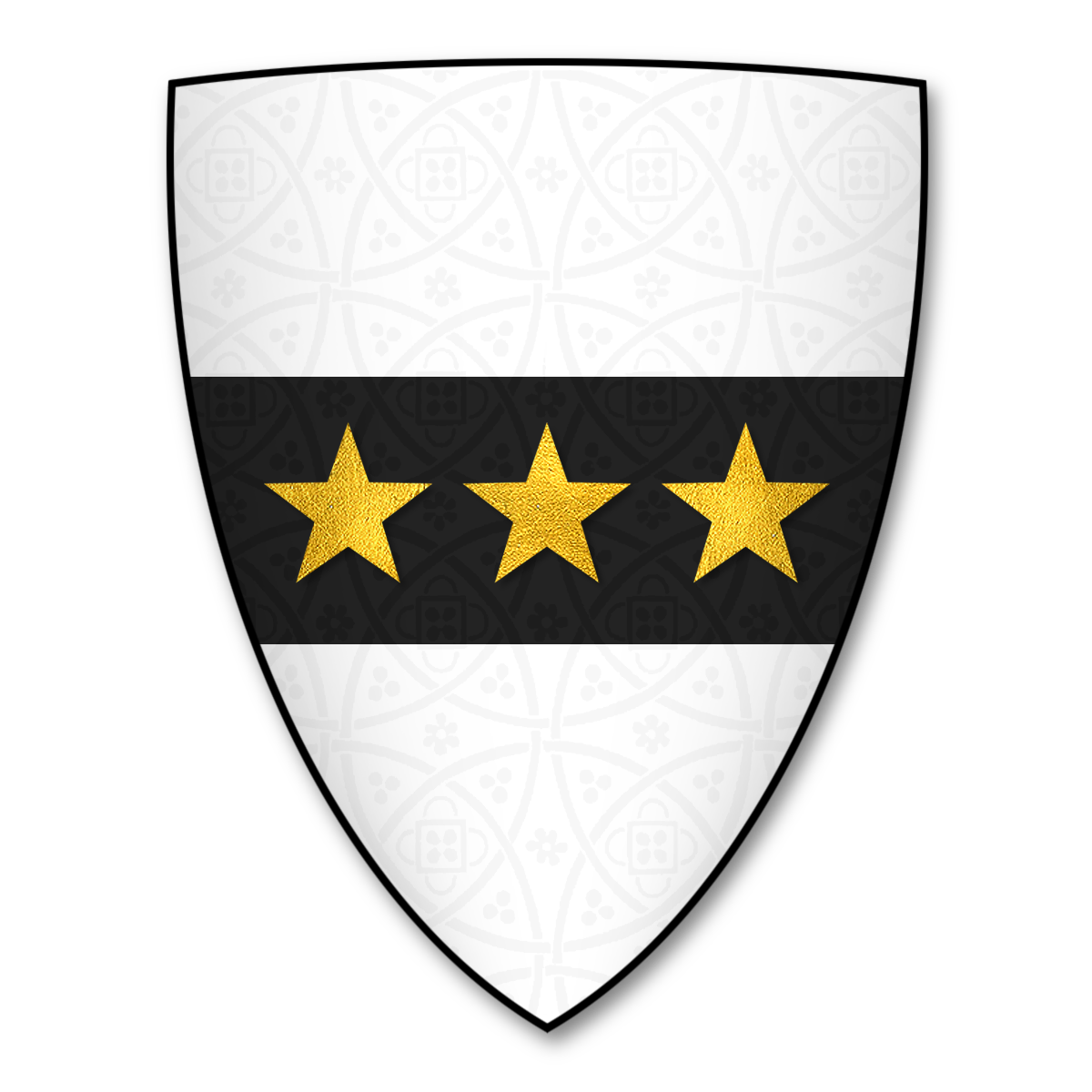
Armorial shield of the Clive family; the design used in the heraldic shield memorial to Clive in the House of Commons

Percy Clive was the eldest son of Charles Meysey Bolton Clive of Whitfield, Herefordshire, by his marriage to Lady Katherine Feilding, daughter of William Feilding, 7th Earl of Denbigh. He was educated at Eton and the Royal Military College, Sandhurst, and was commissioned into the Grenadier Guards as a second lieutenant in 1891. He was appointed as a Deputy Lieutenant of Herefordshire in December 1894, and was attached to the Niger Field Force from 1897 to 1899 based in Lagos, rising to the rank of captain. In May 1899 he was elected a fellow of the Royal Geographical Society.

He was elected to the Commons as the Member of Parliament (MP) for the Ross division of Herefordshire in the "khaki election" of 1900, while fighting in the Second Boer War. He did not return to England to take his seat until February 1902, and in June that year was Private Secretary for Parliamentary purposes to Lord George Hamilton, Secretary of State for India. In December 1903 he was appointed Parliamentary Private Secretary to E G Pretyman, Parliamentary and Financial Secretary to the Admiralty.

He was unseated at the 1906 general election, which saw the Liberal Party win a landslide victory. He returned to Parliament at a by-election in January 1908, and remained Ross's MP until his death. Following a merger of the Unionist parties in 1912 he became a Conservative.

He returned to the army in World War I and was wounded twice. Clive was awarded the Legion of Honour, and the Croix de Guerre, and was twice Mentioned in Despatches. As a lieutenant-colonel of the Grenadier Guards he was killed in action when attached to the 1/5th Lancashire Fusiliers, 5 April 1918 at Bucquoy. Memorial services were held on 17 April at St Margaret's, Westminster and Hereford Cathedral. He is commemorated on the Arras Memorial. Clive is commemorated on Panel 8 of the Parliamentary War Memorial in Westminster Hall, one of 22 MPs that died during World War I to be named on that memorial. Clive is one of 19 MPs who fell in the war who are commemorated by heraldic shields in the Commons Chamber. A further act of commemoration came with the unveiling in 1932 of a manuscript-style illuminated book of remembrance for the House of Commons, which includes a short biographical account of the life and death of Clive.

His elder son Major Meysey George Dallas Clive (1907–1943) was killed with the Grenadier Guards in World War II in North Africa on 1 May 1943. His younger son Lewis Clive (1910–1938) won a gold medal for rowing at the 1932 Olympics and was a member of the International Brigade in the Spanish Civil War, killed in action in August 1938.

Some of his military papers were deposited in the King's College London archives in 1997 but his family retain others.

Parliament of the United Kingdom
Preceded by Michael Biddulph	Member of Parliament for Ross; 1900–1906	Succeeded by Alan Coulston Gardner
Preceded by Alan Coulston Gardner	Member of Parliament for Ross; 1908–1918	Succeeded by Charles Thornton Pulley
