= William Denman Croft =

British military officer (1879–1968)

Brigadier-General William Denman Croft CB CMG DSO***
- Portrait by Walter Stoneman, 1918
- Born: 15 March 1879
- Died: 14 July 1968 (aged 89); Cornwall, England
- Relatives: Sir Herbert Croft, 9th Baronet (father)
- Military career
- Allegiance: United Kingdom
- Branch: British Army
- Service years: 1898–1934
- Rank: Brigadier-General
- Commands: 11th Battalion, Royal Scots (1915–1917)
- Conflicts: First World War; North-West Frontier
- Awards: Companion of the Order of the Bath; Companion of the Order of St Michael and St George; Companion of the Distinguished Service Order & Three Bars; Mentioned in Despatches (11); Legion of Honour (France)

Brigadier-General William Denman Croft, CB, CMG, DSO & Three Bars (15 March 1879 – 14 July 1968) was a British Army officer. He served as a brigadier general in the British Army in the First World War, and afterwards in India. He was one of seven British officers to be appointed a Companion of the Distinguished Service Order with three bars in the First World War. He was Home Guard commander in Cornwall during the Second World War.

== Early life ==
Croft was the third son of Conservative MP Sir Herbert George Denman Croft, 9th Baronet and his wife, Georgiana Eliza Lucy Marsh. He was educated at Oxford Military College.

He joined the 4th (Militia) battalion of The King's (Shropshire Light Infantry) as a second lieutenant on 23 February 1898, and was promoted to the rank of lieutenant on 28 June 1899. He received a commission in the regular army when he transferred to the Cameronians (Scottish Rifles) as a second lieutenant on 7 March 1900, to replace an officer killed in the Second Boer War. After being seconded to the Colonial Office in 1903, he served in Nigeria, where he is reputed to have been wounded by a poisoned arrow in 1907.

In 1912, Croft married Esmé Sutton, daughter of Sir Arthur Edwin Sutton, 7th Baronet. They had at least four children, including two sons who served in India in the Second World War, where one was killed in action.

== First World War ==
Croft served on the Western Front in the First World War, and was mentioned in despatches ten times.

At the beginning of the war, Captain Croft was serving as adjutant of the 5th Battalion of the Cameronians. By December 1915, he was temporary lieutenant colonel in command of the 11th Battalion of the Royal Scots. He was then promoted to the rank of temporary brigadier general to command the 27th Infantry Brigade, in the 9th (Scottish) Division, in September 1917, remaining in command until 1919.

In little over two years, from January 1917 to February 1919, he was appointed a Companion of the Distinguished Service Order (DSO) with three bars. He received his initial appointment on 1 January 1917, and a first bar was gazetted 9 days later. He received a second bar in July 1918, and a third bar in February 1919.

He became a brevet lieutenant colonel in January 1918, a Companion of the Order of St Michael and St George (CMG) in January 1919, and an Officier of French Légion d'honneur in August 1919.

After the war, Croft published an account of his war service, under the title Three years with the 9th (Scottish) Division.

== Later life ==
Croft transferred to the Royal Tank Corps in 1920 where he became a lieutenant colonel in 1923. He was temporary brigadier again while Commandant of the Royal Tanks Corps Centre between 1929 and 1931.

He was promoted to the rank of colonel in 1925, with seniority from 1922, and served as an instructor at Senior Officers' School in 1927.

He became temporary brigadier and commander of the Nowshera Brigade in India in 1931. He fought in the Mohmand Operations in 1933, where he was mentioned in despatches, and retired from the military in 1934 with the rank of honorary brigadier general. He became a Companion of the Order of the Bath (CB) in 1935.

In the Second World War, Croft was a Home Guard commander in Cornwall.

== Medals ==
On 29 November 2023, the auction house Spink announced the sale of Croft's campaign medals and decorations 'by order of a direct descendant'. The sale price was reported at £50,400 (including buyer's premium).
