= Sheffield Ecclesall =

Parliamentary constituency in the United Kingdom, 1885–1950

- Former borough constituency for the House of Commons
- County: South Yorkshire

1885–1950
- Created from: Sheffield
- Replaced by: Sheffield Hallam and Sheffield Park

Sheffield Ecclesall was a Parliamentary constituency represented by a single Member of Parliament in the House of Commons from 1885 to 1950. It returned one Member of Parliament (MP) to the House of Commons of the Parliament of the United Kingdom, elected by the first past the post system.

== Boundaries ==
1885–1918: Part of the Municipal Borough of Sheffield ward of Ecclesall.

1918–1950: The County Borough of Sheffield wards of Ecclesall and Sharrow.

Ecclesall constituency covered south central Sheffield. Most of the area that made up this constituency is now included in Sheffield Heeley constituency.

== History ==
The seat was created in 1885, prior to its creation the area had been part of the larger Sheffield borough constituency, which was represented by two MPs. The 1885 Redistribution of Seats Act, which sought to eliminate multi-member constituencies and give greater representation to urban areas, led to the break-up of the constituency into five divisions, each represented by a single MP. Ecclesall was one of these new divisions. The seat was abolished in 1950 as part of a redrawing of the Sheffield constituency boundaries that also led to the abolition of Sheffield Central and the creation of Sheffield Heeley and Sheffield Neepsend.

== Members of Parliament ==
Election	Member	Party
1885	Sir Ellis Ashmead-Bartlett	Conservative
1902 by-election	Samuel Roberts (1st)	Conservative
1923	Albert Harland	Conservative
1929	Samuel Roberts (2nd)	Conservative
1935	Sir Geoffrey Ellis, Bt.	Conservative
1945	Peter Roberts	Conservative
1950	constituency abolished	

The constituency was abolished in 1950. Peter Roberts subsequently stood for, and won, the new Sheffield Heeley seat.

== Election results ==
=== Election in the 1940s ===
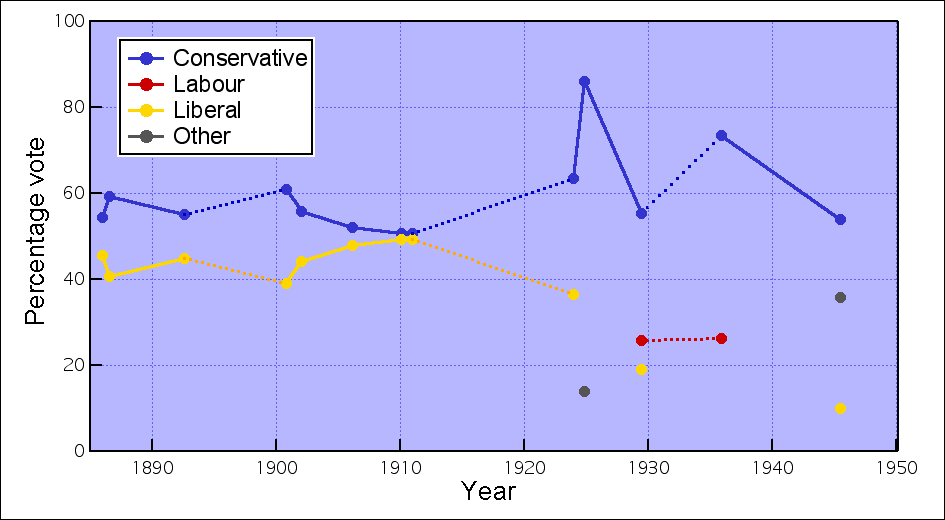
Sheffield Ecclesall election results

General election 1945: Sheffield Ecclesall
Party	Candidate	Votes	%	±%
Conservative	Peter Roberts	18,120	54.0	−19.6
Common Wealth	Sydney Checkland	12,045	35.9	New
Liberal	Philip Rodney Nightingale	3,391	10.1	New
Majority		6,075	18.1	−29.3
Turnout		33,556	75.6	+4.6
Conservative hold		Swing		

=== Elections in the 1930s ===
General election 1935: Sheffield Ecclesall
Party	Candidate	Votes	%	±%
Conservative	Geoffrey Ellis	22,819	73.6	N/A
Labour	Kenneth G. Brooks	8,173	26.2	New
Majority		14,646	47.4	N/A
Turnout		30,992	71.0	N/A
Conservative hold		Swing	N/A	

General election 1931: Sheffield Ecclesall
Party	Candidate	Votes	%	±%
Conservative	Samuel Roberts	Unopposed		
Conservative hold				

=== Elections in the 1920s ===
General election 1929: Sheffield Ecclesall
Party	Candidate	Votes	%	±%
Unionist	Samuel Roberts	17,165	55.3	−30.7
Labour	Harry Samuels	7,983	25.7	New
Liberal	Robert Slack Wells	5,898	19.0	New
Majority		9,182	29.6	−42.4
Turnout		31,046	75.1	+12.3
Unionist hold		Swing		

General election 1924: Sheffield Ecclesall
Party	Candidate	Votes	%	±%
Unionist	Albert Harland	16,131	86.0	+22.4
Independent	Albert Taylor	2,624	14.0	New
Majority		13,507	72.0	+44.8
Turnout		18,755	62.8	−6.7
Unionist hold		Swing		

General election 1923: Sheffield Ecclesall
Party	Candidate	Votes	%	±%
Unionist	Albert Harland	13,047	63.6	N/A
Liberal	Hamer Russell	7,456	36.4	New
Majority		5,591	27.2	N/A
Turnout		20,503	69.5	N/A
Unionist hold		Swing	N/A	

General election 1922: Sheffield Ecclesall
Party	Candidate	Votes	%	±%
Unionist	Samuel Roberts	Unopposed		
Unionist hold				

=== Elections in the 1910s ===
General election 1918: Sheffield Ecclesall
Party		Candidate	Votes	%	±%
C	Unionist	Samuel Roberts	Unopposed		
	Unionist hold				
C indicates candidate endorsed by the coalition government.

General election December 1910: Sheffield Ecclesall
Party	Candidate	Votes	%	±%
Conservative	Samuel Roberts	6,039	50.8	0.0
Liberal	John Derry	5,849	49.2	0.0
Majority		190	1.6	0.0
Turnout		11.888	85.2	−5.1
Conservative hold		Swing		

General election January 1910: Sheffield Ecclesall
Party	Candidate	Votes	%	±%
Conservative	Samuel Roberts	6,407	50.8	−1.3
Liberal	John Derry	6,196	49.2	+1.3
Majority		211	1.6	−2.6
Turnout		12,603	90.3	+3.2
Conservative hold		Swing		

=== Elections in the 1900s ===
General election 1906: Sheffield Ecclesall
Party	Candidate	Votes	%	±%
Conservative	Samuel Roberts	5,856	52.1	−8.9
Liberal	Richard Cornthwaite Lambert	5,392	47.9	+8.9
Majority		464	4.2	−17.8
Turnout		11,248	87.1	+14.1
Registered electors		12,911		
Conservative hold		Swing	−8.9	

1902 Sheffield Ecclesall by-election
Party	Candidate	Votes	%	±%
Conservative	Samuel Roberts	5,231	55.9	−5.1
Liberal	Reginald F. Vaile	4,119	44.1	+5.1
Majority		1,112	11.8	−10.2
Turnout		9,350	74.8	+1.8
Registered electors		12,501		
Conservative hold		Swing	−5.1	

General election 1900: Sheffield Ecclesall
Party	Candidate	Votes	%	±%
Conservative	Ellis Ashmead-Bartlett	5,059	61.0	N/A
Liberal	Reginald F. Vaile	3,230	39.0	New
Majority		1,829	22.0	N/A
Turnout		8,289	73.0	N/A
Registered electors		11,357		
Conservative hold		Swing	N/A	

=== Elections in the 1890s ===
General election 1895: Sheffield Ecclesall
Party	Candidate	Votes	%	±%
Conservative	Ellis Ashmead-Bartlett	Unopposed		
Conservative hold				

General election 1892: Sheffield Ecclesall
Party	Candidate	Votes	%	±%
Conservative	Ellis Ashmead-Bartlett	4,536	55.1	−4.3
Liberal	Robert Eadon Leader	3,696	44.9	+4.3
Majority		840	10.2	−8.6
Turnout		8,232	84.5	+10.2
Registered electors		9,747		
Conservative hold		Swing	−4.3	

=== Elections in the 1880s ===
By-election, 1886: Sheffield Ecclesall
Party	Candidate	Votes	%	±%
Conservative	Ellis Ashmead-Bartlett	Unopposed		
Conservative hold				

- Caused by Ashmead-Bartlett's appointment as Civil Lord of the Admiralty.

General election 1886: Sheffield Ecclesall
Party	Candidate	Votes	%	±%
Conservative	Ellis Ashmead-Bartlett	3,930	59.4	+5.0
Liberal	William Owen	2,688	40.6	−5.0
Majority		1,242	18.8	+10.0
Turnout		6,618	74.3	−11.8
Registered electors		8,904		
Conservative hold		Swing	+5.0	

General election 1885: Sheffield Ecclesall
Party	Candidate	Votes	%	±%
Conservative	Ellis Ashmead-Bartlett	4,171	54.4	
Liberal	Cyril Dodd	3,492	45.6	
Majority		679	8.8	
Turnout		7,663	86.1	
Registered electors		8,904		
Conservative win (new seat)				
