= Shân Legge-Bourke =

British landowner (1943–2025)

The Honourable Dame Shân Legge-Bourke DCVO
- Born: 10 September 1943; Crickhowell, Wales
- Died: 14 December 2025 (aged 82)
- Spouse: William Legge-Bourke (m. 1964; died 2009)
- Children: 3; including Tiggy

Dame Elizabeth Shân Josephine Legge-Bourke, DCVO (née Bailey; 10 September 1943 – 14 December 2025) was a Welsh landowner who served as the second Lord Lieutenant of Powys.

== Background ==
Legge-Bourke was born on 10 September 1943 in Crickhowell, Wales. She was the only child of Wilfred Bailey, 3rd Baron Glanusk, and his second wife Margaret Eldrydd Shoubridge. She inherited the Glanusk Park estate in 1948. In 1966, her mother married William Sidney, 1st Viscount De L'Isle. She attended boarding school in East Sussex.

In 1964, she married William Legge-Bourke (1939–2009; son of Sir Harry Legge-Bourke, a Conservative MP for the Isle of Ely), and they had three children, including Tiggy Legge-Bourke.

Legge-Bourke died after a long illness on 14 December 2025, at the age of 82.

== Honours ==
In 1998, Legge-Bourke was appointed Lord Lieutenant of Powys. In 2006 she was the subject of a BBC Wales series entitled The Lady of Glanusk.

Appointed a Lieutenant of the Royal Victorian Order (LVO) in 1988, in the 2015 New Year Honours Legge-Bourke was promoted to Dame Commander of the Royal Victorian Order (DCVO).

She was appointed an Extra Lady-in-Waiting to Princess Anne in January 2024.

Honorary titles
Preceded by Mervyn Leigh Bourdillon	Lord Lieutenant of Powys; 1998–2018	Succeeded by Tia C. Jones
