= Alan Coulston Gardner =

British politician and soldier (1842-1907)

Alan Colstoun Gardner
- Born: 19 November 1842
- Died: 25 December 1907 (aged 65); Algeciras
- Spouse: Nora Blyth
- Military career
- Allegiance: United Kingdom
- Branch: British Army
- Rank: Colonel
- Units: 11th Hussars; 14th King's Hussars
- Conflicts: Anglo-Zulu War: Battle of Isandlwana; Battle of Hlobane; Battle of Kambula

Col. Alan Colstoun Gardner (19 November 1842 – 25 December 1907) was a British Liberal Party politician and soldier. He was a son of Alan Legge Gardner.

== Military career ==
Capt Alan Gardner passed Staff College in 1872. He served in the 11th Hussars and the 14th King's Hussars. He was involved in the Anglo-Zulu War of 1879, and was present at the Battle of Isandlwana where he was one of only five British officers to survive. At the Battle of Hlobane Mountain his horse was killed. At the Battle of Kambula he was severely wounded. He was mentioned in despatches twice and received the medal with clasp for services during the Anglo-Zulu Wars. He was a brevet-major.

He was aide-de-camp to the Viceroy of Ireland Earl Cowper in 1880. He was also involved in the 1st Boer War in 1881.

In 1885, Gardner married Hon. Nora Beatrice Blyth. They had two sons and three daughters.

== Political career ==
In politics he was a member of the Liberal Party. Gardner contested the Conservative seat of Marylebone East in 1895, coming second. He was appointed Deputy Lieutenant for Essex.

He served as a Justice of the Peace in Gloucestershire. He gained the Ross Division of Herefordshire from the Liberal Unionists at the General Election of January 1906, sitting until his death in 1907.

== Death ==
He became ill during the winter of 1907 and took a holiday in Gibraltar in order to recuperate, but finally succumbed to Pneumonia on Christmas Day whilst in Algeciras.

== Sources ==
- Birbeck, Kate (5 March 2018). Rifle and Spear with the Zulu: The Life of Lt Col Alan Colstoun Gardner. England: Dreadnought Publishing (published 2018). ISBN 978-1999958701.
- British parliamentary election results 1885–1918, Craig, F. W. S.
- Greaves, Adrian (2011). Isandlwana: How the Zulus humbled the British Empire. South Yorkshire: Pen & Sword Military Ltd. ISBN 978-1-84884-532-9.

Parliament of the United Kingdom
Preceded by Percy Clive	Member of Parliament for Ross; 1906–1907	Succeeded by Percy Clive
