= Joseph Bailey, 1st Baron Glanusk =

Welsh Conservative Member of Parliament (1840–1906)

Joseph Russell Bailey, 1st Baron Glanusk (7 April 1840 – 6 January 1906), known as Sir Joseph Bailey, 2nd Baronet, from 1858 to 1899, was a Welsh Conservative Member of Parliament.

== Early life ==
Born at Leamington Spa, he was the son of Joseph Bailey (1812–1850), and his wife, Elizabeth Mary Russell, the eldest daughter of William Congreve Russell. He was the grandson of the ironmaster Sir Joseph Bailey, 1st Baronet, whom he succeeded as second Baronet, of Glanusk Park, in 1858, after his father had died 8 years earlier.

== Career ==
On 14 February 1861 he was commissioned as a Lieutenant in the part-time 3rd (Crickhowell) Brecknockshire Rifle Volunteer Corps. On 15 May 1867, his company commander was promoted to command the 1st Administrative Battalion, Brecknockshire Rifle Volunteer Corps, and on the same day Bailey was appointed the battalion's first Honorary Colonel. He retained the position with the unit's successor, the 1st (Brecknockshire) Volunteer Battalion, South Wales Borderers, until his death, when he was succeeded by his eldest son. He was awarded the Volunteer Decoration.

In 1864, he served as High Sheriff of Brecknockshire. In 1865 he was elected to the British House of Commons for Herefordshire, a seat he held until 1885 when the constituency was abolished, and then represented Hereford between 1886 and 1892. He also served as Lord Lieutenant of Brecknockshire from 1875 to 1905. In 1899, he was raised to the peerage as Baron Glanusk, of Glanusk Park, in the County of Brecknock.

== Family ==
He married Mary Ann, daughter of Henry Lucas, MD, on 9 April 1861, and they had the following children:

- Hon. Elizabeth Mabel Bailey, born 16 March 1862, Justice of the peace
- Hon. Joseph Henry Russell Bailey, born 26 October 1864, Major, Grenadier Guards, served in Second Boer War and World War I
- Hon. Edith Bailey, born 18 February 1866, married 20 April 1892 Samuel Hood Cowper-Coles, died 22 February 1933
- Hon. William Bailey, born 28 August 1867, 11th Hussars, served in North West Frontier Expedition 1897, Major Welsh Horse Yeomanry in World War I, died 24 December 1942
- Hon. Arthur Bailey, born 3 December 1868, Captain East African Mounted Rifles, served in Second Boer War and World War I, died 19 January 1929
- Cecile Mary Bailey, born 25 March, died 2 November 1870
- Hon. Herbert Crawshay Bailey, born 23 June 1871, Barrister-at-Law, served in World War I, died 13 April 1936, father of the 4th Baron Glanusk
- Hon. Margaret Elinor Bailey, born 28 October 1878
- Hon. Gwladys Mary Bailey, born 29 March 1875
- Hon. John Lancelot Bailey, born 2 December 1878, Captain South Wales Borderers, served in World War I, died 26 October 1918

Lord Glanusk died in January 1906, aged 65, and was succeeded in his titles by his eldest son Joseph, who became the 2nd Baron. Lady Glanusk died in 1935.

== Coat of arms ==
Coat of arms of Joseph Bailey, 1st Baron Glanusk
Notes Coat of arms of Baron Glanusk Coronet A coronet of a Baron Crest A Griffin sejant Argent semy of Annulets Gules Escutcheon Argent between two Bars three Annulets in fess Gules between as many Martlets of the last Supporters Dexter: a Collier proper; Sinister: a Smith proper Motto Libertas (Liberty)

== Notes ==
Parliament of the United Kingdom
Preceded by James King King; Lord Montagu Graham; Humphrey Francis St John-Mildmay	Member of Parliament for Herefordshire; 1865–1885; With: James King King 1865–1868; Michael Biddulph 1865–1885; Sir Herbert Croft, Bt 1868–1874; Daniel Peploe Peploe 1874–1880; Thomas Duckham 1880–1885	Constituency abolished
Preceded by Joseph Pulley	Member of Parliament for Hereford; 1886–1892	Succeeded by William Grenfell
Honorary titles
Preceded by The Lord Tredegar	Lord Lieutenant of Brecknockshire; 1875–1905	Succeeded by Joseph Bailey
Peerage of the United Kingdom
New creation	Baron Glanusk; 1899–1906	Succeeded by Joseph Bailey
Baronetage of the United Kingdom
Preceded by Joseph Bailey	Baronet of Glanusk Park; 1858–1906	Succeeded by Joseph Bailey
