= Lord Lieutenant of Powys =

Welsh county ceremonial officer

This is an incomplete list of people who have served as Lord Lieutenant for Powys. Prior to 1974, the Monarch was represented in the area by the Lord Lieutenant of Montgomeryshire, the Lord Lieutenant of Radnorshire and the Lord Lieutenant of Brecknockshire.

- Col. John Corbett-Winder, 1 April 1974– (formerly Lord Lieutenant of Montgomeryshire), with two lieutenants:
  - Captain Nevill Williams, 1 April 1974– (formerly Lord Lieutenant of Breconshire)
  - Brigadier Sir Charles Dillwyn-Venables-LLewelyn, 1 April 1974– (formerly Lord Lieutenant of Radnorshire)
- Mervyn Bourdillon, 1986–1998
- Dame Elizabeth Shân Legge-Bourke, 1998–2018
- Tia Jones, 10 September 2018 – present
