= Thomas William Booker-Blakemore =

English politician (1801–1858)

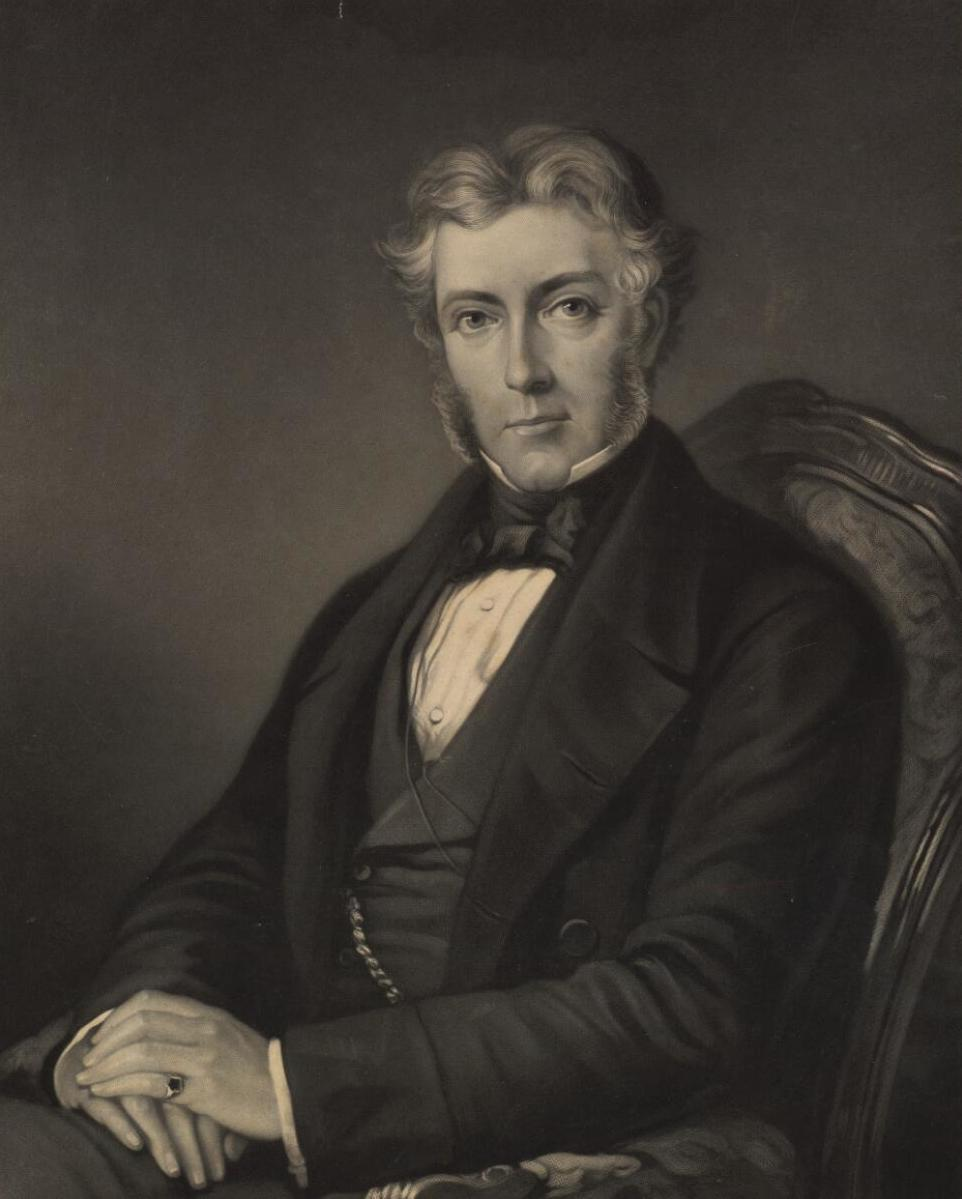
- Portrait of T. W. Booker-Blakemore
- Born: September 28, 1801; Dudley
- Died: November 7, 1858 (aged 57); Kingston upon Thames
- Occupations: industrialist, landowner, and politician

Thomas William Booker-Blakemore (ne Thomas William Booker) (28 September 1801 – 7 November 1858), MP, was an industrialist, landowner, and politician.

== Early years ==
He was born in Dudley in 1801. He was the son of the Reverend Luke Booker (1762–1836), Chaplains in Ordinary to George Prince Regent, vicar of Dudley, rector of Tedstone Delamere, and an author of poetry and other publications. His mother, Ann, was the daughter of Thomas Blakemore (d. 1808), of Littleton Hall in West Bromwich, and Anne Partridge (d. 1838) of Ross-on-Wye. He had one half-brother, John-Key Booker, and three sisters, Harriet-Esther, Catherine, and Mary. Booker was educated at Hartlebury, Worcestershire. At an early age, he was adopted by his maternal uncle, Richard Blakemore of Velindre House, who brought him up at the Melingriffith Tin Plate Works.

== Career ==
Booker took an active role in the affairs of politics, serving as Justice of the Peace and Deputy Lieutenant of Hereford, Monmouth, and Glamorgan. In 1848, he served as High Sheriff of Glamorgan. He represented Herefordshire as a Member of Parliament (1819–1858). He was a Conservative in politics and an active magistrate. He was Chairman of the Monmouthshire Railway and Canal Company, and of the Cardiff Steam Navigation Company. Booker was a large employer at his works at Pentyrch and Melingriffith. He took out patents for tin plate making in 1837 and for manufacturing iron in 1841. One of his aims was to add land to his estates. He acquired properties, owning the whole of Pentyrch; he had freeholds at Whitchurch, Llandaff, and Llanlltyd. At one time his estate consisted of 8,000 acres. Booker held an annual flower show at Wauntreoda, Whitchurch. He was interested in scientific pursuits, particularly mineralogy. He joined the Institution of Civil Engineers as an Associate in 1850.

== Personal life ==
He married Jane-Anne Coghlan in 1824. They had three sons, Thomas-William Booker of Velindre, Richard-Blakemore Booker (d. 1861) of The Leys, and John-Partridge Booker; and two daughters, Anna (d. 1855) and Mary. He assumed his uncle's surname by royal licence in 1855, and died of apoplexy at Kingston upon Thames in 1858 aged 57.

== Partial works ==
- Torquay : a poem (1816)
- The prize treatise on the mineral basin of Glamorgan and the adjoining district, and the national benefits arising therefrom (Gwent and Dyfed Royal Eisteddfod) (1834)
- Poems on the loss and re-building of St. Mary's Church, Cardiff. (1842)
- A Speech, delivered at Swansea, at the annual meeting of the Royal British Association for the Advancement of Science, etc. (On the mineral productions of South Wales) (1848)
