= Lower Dock Street drill hall, Newport =

Former military installation in Wales

Lower Dock Street drill hall
- Newport, Wales
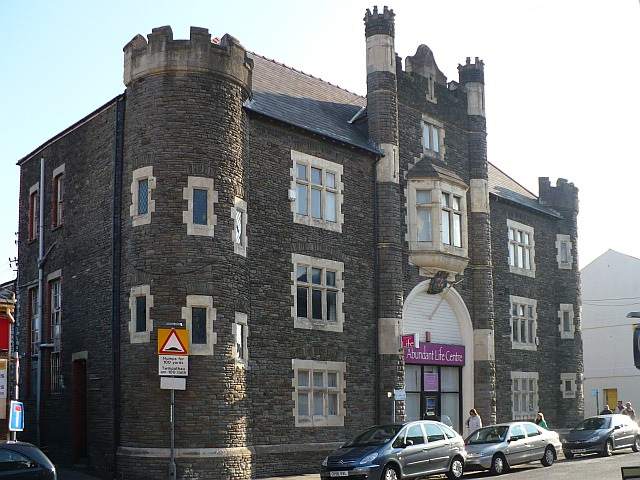
- Lower Dock Street drill hall

Site information
- Type: Drill hall

Location
- Location in Newport
- Coordinates: 51.58442°N 2.99078°W

Site history
- Built: 1867
- Built for: War Office
- In use: 1867 – 1960s

The Lower Dock Street Street drill hall is a former military installation in Newport, Wales.

== History ==
The building was designed as the headquarters of the 3rd Monmouthshire Rifle Volunteer Corps and was completed in 1867. This unit combined with other units to become the 1st Monmouthshire Rifle Volunteer Corps in 1880 and evolved to become the 2nd Volunteer Battalion, The South Wales Borderers in 1885 and the 1st Battalion, The Monmouthshire Regiment in 1908. The battalion was mobilised at the drill hall in August 1914 before being deployed to the Western Front. The battalion evolved to become the 68th (The Monmouthshire Regiment) Searchlight Regiment, Royal Artillery in 1940, the 609th Regiment, Royal Artillery (The Monmouthshire Regiment) in 1945 and the 603rd (Mixed) Heavy Anti-Aircraft Regiment, Royal Artillery (1st (Rifle) Battalion The Monmouthshire Regiment) in 1947.

In 1955, the presence at the drill hall was reduced to a single battery, P (1st Monmouthshire) Battery, 283rd Field Regiment, a unit which evolved, in 1961, into R (1st Monmouthshire) Battery, 282nd (Glamorgan/Monmouth) Field Regiment. In 1967, further reductions took place and, when the Monmouthshire line was taken up by 211 (South Wales) Battery, 104th Light Air Defence Regiment, that unit was based at Raglan Barracks. The Lower Dock Street drill hall was decommissioned and subsequently used by various religious and community organisations. It is a Grade II listed building.
