= Conway Street drill hall, Brecon =

Drill hall in Brecon, Wales

Conway Street drill hall
- Brecon
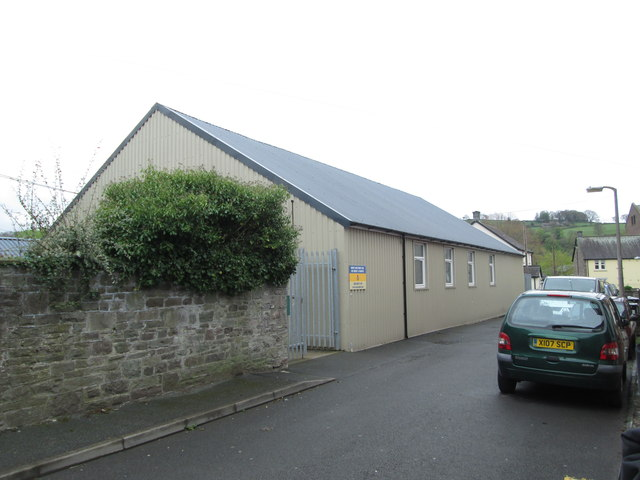
- Conway Street drill hall (after the rebuilding)

Site information
- Type: Drill hall

Location
- Location in Powys
- Coordinates: 51.94470°N 3.38708°W

Site history
- Built: Early 20th century
- Built for: War Office
- In use: Early 20th century – Present

The Conway Street drill hall is a former military installation in Brecon, Wales.

== History ==
The building was designed as the headquarters of the 1st (Brecknockshire) Volunteer Battalion, South Wales Borderers and was completed in the early 20th century. This unit evolved to become the 1st (Brecknockshire) Battalion, The South Wales Borderers in 1908. The battalion was mobilised at the drill hall in August 1914 before being deployed to India. The battalion amalgamated with the 3rd Battalion, The Monmouthshire Regiment to form 3rd (Brecknockshire and Monmouthshire) Battalion, The Monmouthshire Regiment at the Baker Street drill hall in Abergavenny in 1922. The drill hall was subsequently decommissioned and, although it has recently been substantially rebuilt, it continues to be used as an Army Cadet Force Centre.
