= Brecknockshire Battalion =

1st Brecknockshire Rifle Volunteers Brecknockshire Battalion, SWB 638 (Brecknock) LAA Regiment, RA
- Active: 21 August 1859–1 April 1967
- Country: United Kingdom
- Branch: Volunteer Force/Territorial Force
- Role: Infantry/Air defence artillery
- Size: 1–3 Battalions/1 Regiment
- Part of: South Wales Borderers; Royal Artillery
- Garrison/HQ: The Barracks, Brecon
- Engagements: Second Boer War; Battle of Lahej

Commanders
- Notable commanders: Joseph Bailey, 2nd Lord Glanusk, CB, CBE, DSO

The Brecknockshire Battalion was a Welsh unit of the British Army's auxiliary forces. First raised in 1859, it became a Volunteer Battalion of the South Wales Borderers. During World War I it served in garrison at Aden, where it was engaged in the Battle of Lahej. It was amalgamated with another battalion in the 1920s but regained its independence in time for World War II, when it served in home defence and supplied reinforcements to the forces fighting overseas. Postwar it was reformed as a light anti-aircraft regiment of the Royal Artillery and was one of the founder units of today's 104th Regiment Royal Artillery in the Army Reserve.

== Volunteer Force ==
An invasion scare in 1859 led to the emergence of the Volunteer Movement, and Rifle Volunteer Corps (RVCs) began to be organised throughout Great Britain. Six such RVCs were quickly raised in the county of Brecknockshire:

- 1st (Brecknock) Brecknockshire RVC, formed at Brecon 21 August 1859 under the command of Captain Henry Gore Lindsay, formerly of the Rifle Brigade; two companies by March 1860
- 2nd (Brynmawr) Brecknockshire RVC, formed 13 February 1860
- 3rd (Crickhowell) Brecknockshire RVC, formed 30 August 1860
- 4th (Hay) Brecknockshire RVC, formed at Hay-on-Wye 7 April 1860
- 5th (Builth) Brecknockshire RVC, formed at Builth Wells 4 June 1860
- 6th (Talgarth) Brecknockshire RVC, formed 14 February 1861

From 30 August 1860 these were grouped into the 1st Administrative Battalion, Brecknockshire RVCs, with headquarters at Brecon. Henry Lindsay was promoted to Lieutenant-Colonel in command of the Admin Bn on 23 July 1861. He resigned in 1867 and his Major, Frederick Ximenes Gwynne of the 3rd RVC, formerly a Lieutenant in the 94th Foot, was promoted to succeed him on 15 May 1867. On the same date, Sir Joseph Bailey, 2nd Baronet of Glanusk, MP, who had been commissioned as a lieutenant in the 3rd RVC on 14 February 1861, was appointed the battalion's Honorary Colonel. The Reverend William L. Bevan, later Archdeacon of Brecon, was appointed Honorary Chaplain to the 3rd RVC on its formation, and continued in this role with the battalion until his death in 1908.

Under the 'Localisation of the Forces' scheme introduced by the Cardwell Reforms of 1872, Volunteers were brigaded with their local Regular and Militia battalions – for the Brecknockshire Battalion, this was in Sub-District No 25 (Counties of Cardigan, Radnor, Brecon and Monmouth) of Western District, with the following units:

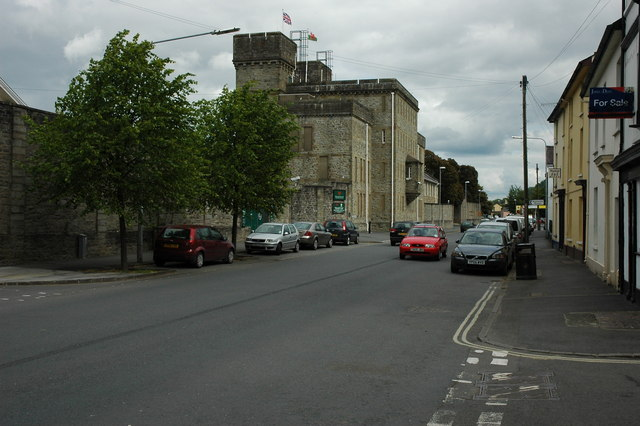
The Barracks on The Watton, Brecon.

- 1st and 2nd Battalions 24th (2nd Warwickshire) Regiment of Foot
- Royal Monmouthshire Light Infantry Militia at Monmouth
- Royal Brecon Rifles Militia at Brecon
- Royal Cardigan Rifles Militia at Aberystwyth
- 1st Administrative Battalion of Monmouth Rifle Volunteers at Newport
- 2nd Administrative Battalion of Monmouth Rifle Volunteers at Pontypool
- 2nd Monmouth Rifle Volunteers at Pontypool

Because there had been no regular regiment affiliated with these counties, the 2nd Warwickshire was arbitrarily assigned. Each sub-district was to form a permanent depot for these affiliated battalions, and as the 24th Foot had no previous connection with the region, Brecon was chosen as its site, with both a militia and a volunteer battalion already based there. Brecon Barracks, first built in 1805, were taken over in 1873 and extended.

A 7th (Cefn) Brecknockshire RVC was formed at Cefn Coed on 15 June 1878 and immediately joined the 1st Admin Bn.

The RVCs were consolidated into larger units in 1880, the 1st Admin Bn at Brecon being designated 1st Brecknockshire RVC on 16 March with the following organisation:

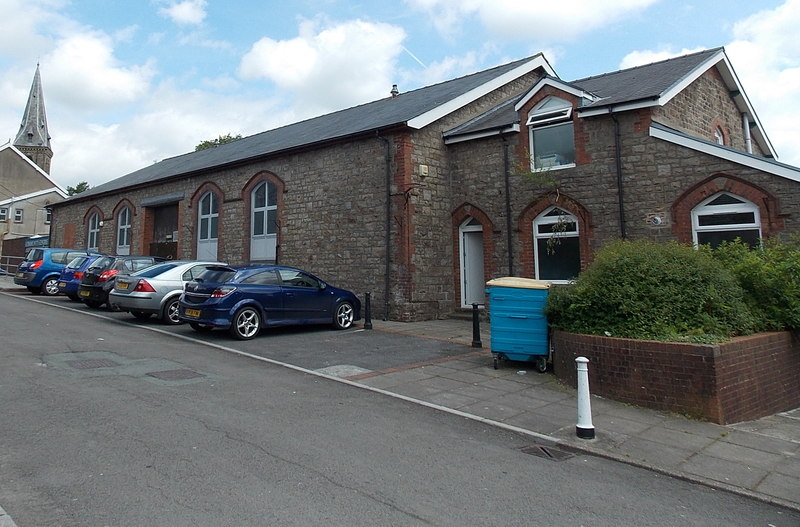
The community centre at Cefn-coed-y-cymmer, formerly the drill hall of G Company, Brecknockshire Battalion.

- Battalion Headquarters at Brecon Barracks
- A Company at King Edward Road, Brecon (ex 1st RVC)
- B Company at North Somerset Street, Brynmawr (ex 2nd RVC)
- C Company at Bridge Street, Crickhowell (ex 3rd RVC)
- D Company at Lion Street, Hay-on-Wye (ex 4th RVC)
- E Company at West Street, Builth Wells, with a drill station at Llanwrtyd Wells (ex 5th RVC)
- F Company at Bank Terrace, Talgarth (ex 6th RVC)
- G Company at Cefn Coed (ex 7th RVC)
- H Company at Brecon (ex 1st RVC), later disbanded
- Mounted Infantry Company at Glasbury, formed 1884, disbanded 1898
- H Company at Ystradgynlais, formed 1894
- Christ College, Brecon, Cadet Corps, formed 1894
- Brecon Intermediate School Cadet Corps, formed 1901

=== South Wales Borderers ===
The Childers Reforms of 1881 took Cardwell's reforms further, the regular regiments dropping their numbers and adopting territorial titles, with the militia and volunteer battalions formally affiliated to them. The 24th Foot, which had been arbitrarily assigned to Wales, became the South Wales Borderers (SWB) on 1 July 1881, with the 1st Brecknockshire becoming the first volunteer battalion (VB); it was redesignated 1st Brecknockshire Volunteer Battalion, South Wales Borderers on 1 July 1885 (unusually the county was included in the formal title, not even as a subtitle). Major T. Conway Lloyd, formerly a captain in the 84th Foot, was promoted to lt-col and commanding officer (CO) of the battalion on 15 December 1883.

While the sub-districts were referred to as 'brigades', they were purely administrative organisations and the volunteers were excluded from the 'mobilisation' part of the Cardwell system. The Stanhope Memorandum of December 1888 proposed a more comprehensive Mobilisation Scheme for volunteer units, which would assemble in their own brigades at key points in case of war. In peacetime these brigades provided a structure for collective training. Under this scheme the battalion formed part of the Welsh Brigade; later this brigade exchanged some units with the Severn Brigade and became the South Wales Border Brigade, with its HQ at Port Talbot and its place of assembly at Newport. After the Second Boer War it became the South Wales Border Brigade, comprising the five VBs of the SWB, with its HQ at Brecon. Lieutenant-Col Fleming Gough of Ystradgynlais was CO of the battalion from 20 October 1897.

=== Second Boer War ===
After Black Week in December 1899, the volunteers were invited to send active service units to assist the Regulars in the Second Boer War. In January 1900 the War Office decided that one Volunteer Service Company (VSC) company 114 strong could be recruited from the volunteer battalions of any infantry regiment that had a regular battalion serving in South Africa. The SWB's five VBs accordingly raised a service company between them, the numbers of volunteers coming forward being much larger than were required.

==== 1st Volunteer Service Company, SWB ====
The company assembled at Brecon Barracks for intensive training, with emphasis on musketry, and Capt J. Llewelyn Phillips of the 2nd VB was appointed to its command. The company left Brecon by train on 14 February to link up with the 1st VSC of the Welsh Regiment at Newport, but the train was delayed by snow and the company only just reached Southampton Docks in time to catch the Union Line steamer Greek was preparing to sail with the 1st VSC Welsh regiment and large numbers of other troops. They disembarked at Cape Town on 9 March and after a few days' acclimatisation at Green Point camp, the 1st VSC SWB was posted to guard the railway between Cape Town and De Aar Junction. From its camp at Kettering the nearest of the three bridges it was to guard was 7 miles (11 km) distant, involving considerable marching for the guard detachments.

On 2 May the SWB and Welsh Regiment's VSCs joined a column moving north by rail to join Lord Roberts' army advancing towards Johannesburg. At Vet River on 8 May the 1st VSC SWB detrained and marched to join 2nd Bn SWB at Ostfontein. It became 'I" Company of the 2nd Bn, replacing 'D' Company, which had been detached as Mounted infantry. The Volunteers came into action for the first time at the Battle of Zand River on 10 May, when 7th Division dislodged the Boers from their positions on the opposite bank of the river. Covered by their own artillery, Maj-Gen Archibald Wavell's 15th Brigade, including 2nd SWB, attacked the kopjes on which the Boer guns were in action. The enemy vacated their positions on the approach of the British infantry. I Company suffered one man wounded. The Boers retreated, allowing Roberts' advance to continue to Kroonstad two days later. The 2nd SWB then marched on through Rodeval, the unopposed crossing of the Vaal River, Elandsfontein Junction and Witwatersrand Junction before participating in the ceremonial entry into Johannesburg on 30 May.

The battalion was then stationed at Vereeniging. On 10 June most of 2nd SWB, including I Company, marched out to Vredefort Road, north of Rhenoster, where De Wet's Commando was carrying out attacks along the line of the newly reopened railway. On 7 July most of the battalion moved on to Rhenoster, leaving B and I Companies at Vrederfort Road, where they were kept busy digging entrenchments on the kopjes commanding the town and railway. On 8 August the battalion reassembled and returned to Johannesburg before moving on to Krugersdorp for garrison duty. On 29 August 2nd SWB joined Maj-Gen Fitzroy Hart's Potchefstroom Column trying to stamp out Boer resistance. The column marched 310 miles (500 km) in 33 days, on 29 of which it saw action, though casualties were very low.

Hart's column returned to Krugersdorp on 30 September, and next day the 1st VSC left 2nd Bn SWB and began the first stage of what was expected to be its journey home. However, the war was not ending as expected, and the company was repeatedly delayed and diverted to duties on the lines of communication, and it was not until 27 April 1901 that it finally embarked on the SS Idaho at Cape Town. Disembarking at Southampton on 21 May the company reached Brecon the same day, and was greeted by a company of the 1st (Brecknock) VB and the Christ College Cadet Corps. the men were discharged and later received the Queen's South Africa Medal.

==== 2nd Volunteer Service Company, SWB ====
With the war continuing, a relief VSC was mobilised at Brecon in February 1901. Unlike a year earlier far fewer volunteers came forward, many being discouraged by stories of hard service and the poor pay compared to that received by volunteers for the Imperial Yeomanry. Under the command of Capt H.L. Rosser of the 3rd VB, the 2nd VSC embarked at Southampton on 31 March and landed at Cape Town on 16 April. It was sent on railway protection duties successively at the Cape Colony garrisons of Beaufort West, Richmond Road and Richmond. The company first saw action at Richmond when together with the other troops in the garrison repulsed a Boer attack. In September the company was released to join 2nd SWB at Klerksdorp, where it also became I Company. Here it was employed on patrol duties and in the blockhouse line. In October the company was attached to Col Hickie's Flying Column, whose task was to protect Royal Engineers and labourers extending the blockhouse line from Klerksdorp to Ventersdorp under threat from Liebenberg's Commando. On 13 November the column's Yeomanry screen was ambushed and force to surrender, the rest of the column then digging in at Brackspruit and remaining entrenched until relief columns could arrive. From December 1901 the 2nd VSC manned blockhouses in the Klerksdorp district.

The 2nd VSC was released just before the Treaty of Vereeniging was signed on 31 May 1902 and the war ended. It sailed on SS Syria from Cape Town to Southampton, arriving on 25 May and being greeted and discharged the same day at Brecon. A number of men had been invalided due to Enteric fever and four had died on service.

==== 3rd Volunteer Service Company, SWB ====
When the call was made in January 1902 for the 3rd VSC it was found difficult to raise sufficient numbers of volunteers. Mobilised at Brecon in February, it sailed for South Africa and jojned 2nd SWB at Klerksdorp on 15 April. During its short period of service the company served in garrison and blockhouse duties, After the Treaty of Vereeniging it was released and sailed home to a military and civic reception at Newtown on 2 August.

The battalions that had contributed volunteers to the service companies were awarded the appropriate Battle honour: 1st (Brecknockshire) VB receiving South Africa, 1900–01 (suggesting that its contribution was primarily to the 1st VSC).

== Territorial Force ==
When the Volunteers were subsumed into the new Territorial Force (TF) under the Haldane Reforms of 1908, several of the SWB's volunteer battalions left to form the all-TF Monmouthshire Regiment. The Brecknockshire Battalion remained as the SWB's only TF battalion but was not numbered in the regimental sequence. The battalion's cadet corps became part of the Junior Division of the Officers' Training Corps, the other companies and their locations remained unchanged. The battalion gained its own drill hall in Brecon, at Conway Street, built in the early 20th century.

The battalion was part of the South Wales Brigade, which had its HQ at Brecon. The brigade was outside the TF's divisional organisation but was designated as 'Army Troops' attached to the Welsh Division.

In a most unusual arrangement, Joseph Bailey, 2nd Lord Glanusk, who had been the battalion's Honorary Colonel since 1907 in succession to his father, was also appointed commanding officer of the battalion on 20 March 1912 with the rank of lt-col. (He was a former major in the Grenadier Guards and had previously been lt-col commanding 3rd (Royal South Wales Borderers Militia) Battalion, South Wales Borderers.) The Rev Edward L. Bevan, who had served alongside his father William Bevan as an assistant chaplain to the battalion since 1897, and succeeded him as Archdeacon of Brecon in 1907, was commissioned as Chaplain 2nd Class (TF) on 4 September 1912.

== World War I ==
=== Mobilisation ===
On 25 July 1914 the Brecknockshire Battalion went to Porthmadog for its summer training camp. However, the international situation was rapidly deteriorating and it returned to Brecon where, on the outbreak of World War I on 4 August, it was mobilised. Next day it moved to its war station at Pembroke Dock.

The TF was intended to be a home defence force for service during wartime and members could not be compelled to serve outside the country. However, on 10 August 1914 TF units were invited to volunteer for overseas service and the majority did so. On 15 August, the War Office issued instructions to separate those men who had signed up for Home Service only, and form these into reserve units. On 31 August, the formation of a reserve or 2nd Line unit was authorised for each 1st Line unit where 60 per cent or more of the men had volunteered for Overseas Service. The titles of these 2nd Line units would be the same as the original, but distinguished by a '2/' prefix. In this way duplicate battalions, brigades and divisions were created, mirroring those TF formations being sent overseas.

=== 1/1st Brecknockshire Battalion ===
The active service battalion (which may not have been designated 1/1st Bn until March 1915 after the 2/1st Bn had been fully formed) moved to Dale, Pembrokeshire, on 28 September. The Welsh Division now found its integral and attached battalions being stripped away for duties elsewhere: the 1/1st Brecknock Bn was the first to leave. It was attached to the Home Counties Division which was being sent to relieve regular battalions in the garrison of India and needed an extra battalion to garrison Aden. The battalion embarked at Southampton Docks on 29 October and arrived at Bombay with the Home Counties Division on 3 December. It immediately transhipped, and arrived at Aden on 16 December under the command of Lord Glanusk.

==== Aden ====
Aden was a vital naval coaling station and submarine telegraph hub on the Suez route to India. By the time the Brecknockshires arrived, war had been declared with the Ottoman Empire (Turkey) and Turkish forces in Yemen were threatening Aden, one attack already having been driven off. In June 1915 Turkish forces attacked Perim island in the Red Sea, and advanced on Lahej, 20 miles (32 km) north of Aden. The Government of India asked for Aden to be reinforced from Egypt. In the meantime the British commander at Aden decided to forestall the Turkish advance on Lahej and protect the friendly Sultan. An 'Aden Moveable Column' was organised, consisting of about 1000 infantry (the largest contingent, over 400 strong, from the 1/1st Brecknockshires) with the Aden Troop of Indian cavalry and artillery support.

The Moveable Column set out on 3 July and marched to Sheikh Othman, but a number of requisitioned cars were sent on ahead carrying a few infantry to reinforce the Aden Troop as the advance guard at Lahej. Most of the cars were bogged down and abandoned, but 9 or 10 got through. The rest of the column set out from Sheikh Othman at 03.00 on 4 July to cover the last 14 miles (23 km) to Lahej. The heat became intense and many of the troops dropped out with heat exhaustion, less than half the column reaching Lahej. The Turks had been delayed by the advance guard and did not reach the town until after dark. There was confused night fighting (the Battle of Lahej) in which the sultan, Sir 'Ali II ibn Ahmad al-'Abdali, was mortally wounded, and the camel drivers fled, taking their loads with them. Learning that he had lost all his stores, his water, and two of his guns, the column commander decided to retreat to Sheikh Othman. Without water the return march on 5 July was even worse than the advance, though the Turks made no attempt to pursue. With almost all of the column incapacitated (around 20 died of heatstroke), Sheikh Othman was abandoned on 7 July (even though it was the head of the main Aden water supply) and the force returned to Aden. The reinforcements from Egypt recaptured Sheikh Othman on 21 July and fortified the position to secure the water supply, but a Turkish garrison remained in Lahej until after the end of the war.

==== India & Afghanistan ====
The exhausted Brecknockshire Battalion was relieved at Aden and returned to India on 5 August 1915. Officially, the battalion remained attached to the 44th (Home Counties) Division, but that formation had been dispersed across India in various garrisons and was never re-assembled. 1/1st Brecknockshire Bn spent the next four years garrisoning Mhow in Central India, where it was administered by the 5th (Mhow) Division. Two half-companies were usually stationed at Indore.

Although the battalion saw no further active service, many officers and men left as reinforcement drafts to the Mesopotamian Front, chiefly to the 4th (Service) Bn, SWB, in 13th (Western) Division. Many NCOs and men were also commissioned into the Indian Army. After the war's end the battalion was still awaiting repatriation to the UK in May 1919 when the Third Anglo-Afghan War broke out. Nearly 300 officers and men of the battalion were drafted as reinforcements to units fighting in the campaign. The Afghan War ended in August 1919, but it was not until October that the 1/1st Brecknockshire Bn was released from its internal security duties and the men could be sent home to be demobilised.

In 1925 the battalion was awarded the Battle Honour Aden, which was borne on the colours of the Monmouthshire Regiment, see below.

=== 2/1st Brecknockshire Battalion ===
The second line battalion was assembled at Brecon and Pembroke Dock between September 1914 and February 1915. It moved to Dale in April 1915. In December 1915 it moved to Bedford where it was attached to but never formally became part of 68th (2nd Welsh) Division in Central Force of Home Defence.

In November 1916 the 2/1st Brecknockshire Bn was absorbed into 2/7th (Merionethshire & Montgomeryshire) Battalion, Royal Welch Fusiliers (RWF) at Wrentham, Suffolk in 203rd (2nd North Wales) Brigade. 68th (2nd W) Division's unit sent so many reinforcement drafts to units fighting overseas that the division was never ready for deployment overseas itself. In the summer of 1917 its battalions began to be replaced by units of the Training Reserve, and 2/7th RWF was disbanded on 12 September 1917, its personnel being distributed amongst the rest of the brigade.

=== 3/1st Brecknockshire Battalion ===
This battalion was formed in April 1915 and served in the Milford Haven defences, its role being to train reinforcements. On 8 April 1916 it was redesignated 1st (Reserve) Bn and on 1 September it joined the Welsh Reserve Brigade. In August 1917 it was combined with 1st (Reserve) Bn, Monmouthshires, in the Welsh Reserve Brigade at Gobowen in Shropshire. In March 1918 it moved to Kinmel Camp in North Wales, and then in June 1918 to Herne Bay in Kent, where it remained for the rest of the war. It was disbanded at Canterbury on 12 June 1919.

=== 50th Provisional Battalion ===
After the 3rd Line TF battalions were formed in May 1915 the remaining Home Service and unfit men were separated to form brigades of Coast Defence Battalions (termed Provisional Battalions from June 1915). The men from the Brecknockshire Battalion and the 4th Bn King's Shropshire Light Infantry were formed into 50th Provisional Battalion, as part of 4th Provisional Brigade. In March 1916, 4th Provisional Brigades moved to defend the Norfolk Coast, but 50th Provisional Bn may not have got there, since it was disbanded and absorbed into 46th Provisional Bn (later 23rd Bn Cheshire Regiment) at Sketty, near Swansea.

== Interwar ==
The TF was reformed on 7 February 1920. At the time the Brecknockshire Battalion was still officially in service; it was formally disembodied and concurrently reformed in the TF on 4 March 1920. In 1921 the TF was renamed as the Territorial Army (TA) and reorganised, as part of which on 31 January 1922 the Brecknockshire Bn was amalgamated with 3rd Bn Monmouthshire Regiment as 3rd (Brecknockshire & Monmouthshire) Bn, Monmouthshire Regiment (the Monmouths were an all-TA regiment with no Regular or Militia components but administered as part of the 'corps' of the SWB). The HQ of the combined battalion was at Baker Street drill hall, Abergavenny.

After the Munich Crisis of 1938 the TA was rapidly doubled in size, most units forming duplicates. The 3rd (B&M) Monmouths achieved this by recreating the 1st Brecknockshire Battalion and returning it to the SWB while 3rd Monmouths dropped its subtitle containing the Brecknockshire name. The new 1st Brecknockshire Bn came into being at Hereford Barracks on 31 March 1939.

== World War II ==
38th (Welsh) Division's formation sign.

The 1st Brecknockshire Bn was assigned to 114th Brigade in 38th (Welsh) Infantry Division, the duplicate of 53rd (Welsh) Division. The division was still being formed when World War II broke out and the TA was mobilised on 1 September 1939. 38th (W) Division began to function independently on 18 September.

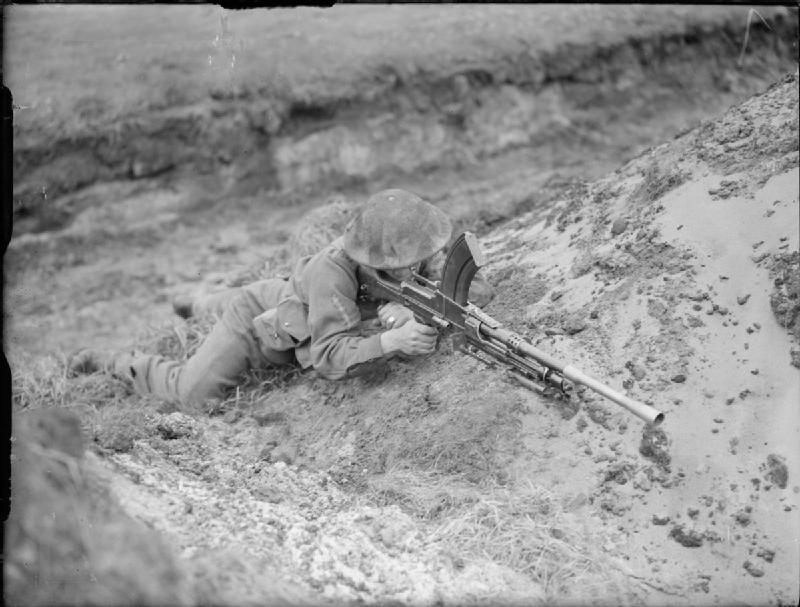
A Bren gunner of the Brecknockshire Battalion on an exercise near Bootle, Liverpool, 16 August 1940.

Until 14 July 1940 the division was undergoing training in south-east Wales in Western Command. Then, after the British Expeditionary Force's evacuation from Dunkirk III Corps HQ took over field command in Western Command, and 38th (W) Division was stationed around Liverpool. On 16 April 1941 the division moved to IV Corps defending the invasion-threatened Sussex coast based at Saltcote Place Rye where the S/NCO's were photographed and many stags at the main gate carved their cap badge into the gate piers. 38th (W) Division was in corps reserve, behind the divisions guarding the coast.

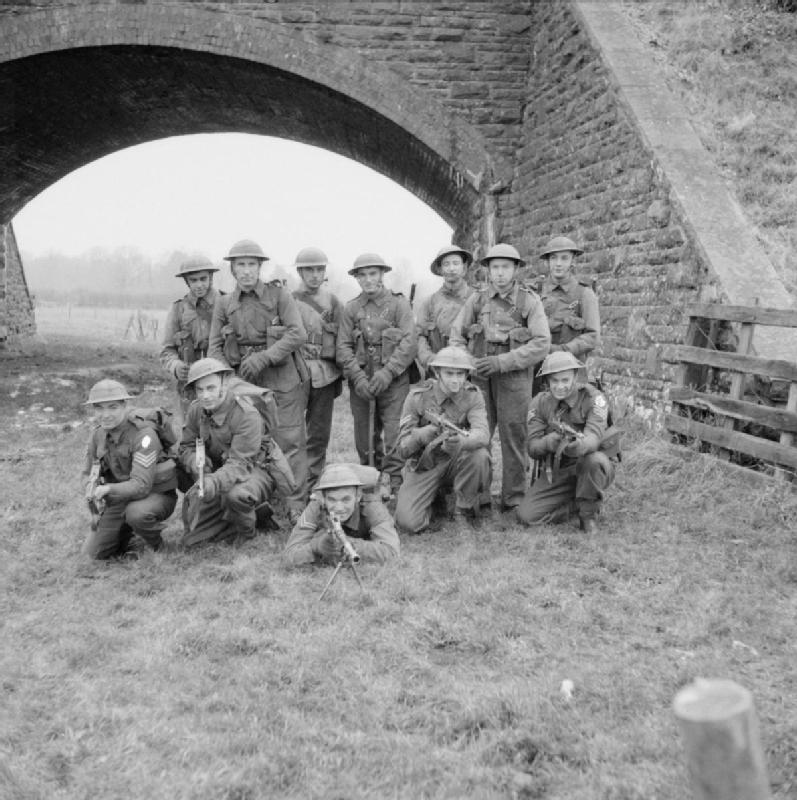
A group from the Brecknockshire Battalion pose near Dorchester, Dorset, 24 January 1942.

However, on 1 December 1941 the division was placed on a lower establishment; this meant that it was not going to be sent overseas for the foreseeable future, and it became a static coast defence formation in Dorset under V Corps. As the invasion threat receded, the lower establishment divisions became sources of units and drafts to reinforce the fighting formations overseas. 38th (W) Division spent the period up to 1944 between Hampshire & Dorset District, II Corps in East Anglia, and East Kent District or II Corps in Kent.

Meanwhile, the formations earmarked for the planned Allied invasion of Normandy (Operation Overlord) were undergoing intensive training. A 12-day exercise carried out by VIII Corps in the Yorkshire Wolds in mid-February 1944 (Exercise Eagle) involved 38th (W) Division and other lower-establishment and reserve formations playing 'the enemy'. After Overlord was launched in June 1944 the lower-establishment divisions were quickly run down as their men were drafted as reinforcements to 21st Army Group (53rd (Welsh) Division, for example, landed in Normandy on 27 June and was immediately heavily engaged). The lower-establishment divisions were broken up on 15 August, when 1st Brecknockshire Bn left 114th Bde and passed into suspended animation.

== Postwar ==
When the TA was reconstituted on 1 January 1947, a number of infantry battalions were converted to other roles, including the Brecknockshire Battalion, which transferred to the Royal Artillery and was converted into 638 (Brecknock) Light Anti-Aircraft Regiment. It was still headquartered at Brecon and it provided the light anti-aircraft (LAA) component of the reformed 53rd (Welsh) Division.

10 March 1955 Anti-Aircraft Command was abolished and there was a series of mergers among the TA's AA units. The regiment was amalgamated once more with 3rd Monmouths, which had themselves been converted to 637 Heavy AA Rgt in 1947, the combined regiment forming 638 (Brecknockshire & Monmouthshire) LAA Rgt. The TA was reorganised again on 1 May 1961 after National Service was abolished. 638 LAA Regiment absorbed a battery of 282 (Welsh) HAA Rgt and 'A' Troop of 868 AA Reporting Battery. By now the regimental HQ (RHQ) was established at Abergavenny. It changed its designation from 'Light Anti-Aircraft' to 'Light Air Defence' in 1964.

In 1967 the TA was reduced into the Territorial and Army Volunteer Reserve (TAVR). 638 (Brecknockshire & Monmouth) LAD Rgt was amalgamated with 228 (Glamorgan & Monmouth Field Rgt) and 444 (Staffordshire) LAD Rgt to form 104 LAD Rgt (Volunteers), with 638 Rgt contributing to RHQ and 'F' (Monmouthshire & Brecknockshire) Troop of 211 (South Wales) Battery. This unit continues in today's Army Reserve as 104th Regiment Royal Artillery, a close support artillery regiment equipped with the L118 light gun.

== Heritage and ceremonial ==
=== Uniforms and insignia ===
The 1st Admin Bn and 1st Brecknockshire Rifle Volunteers wore a 'Rifle grey' uniform with facings. It changed to the standard scarlet coat with white facings of a line infantry regiment in 1884 after it became 1st VB of the SWB. However, in 1905 the SWB was authorised to resume the traditional grass green facings of the old 24th Foot; these were also worn by the Brecknockshire and the 3rd Monmouth battalions.

The battalion's insignia was 'On a mount the Red Dragon passant'. The brass cap badge worn during World War I showed the dragon on its mount, with a scroll underneath inscribed 'BRECKNOCKSHIRE'.

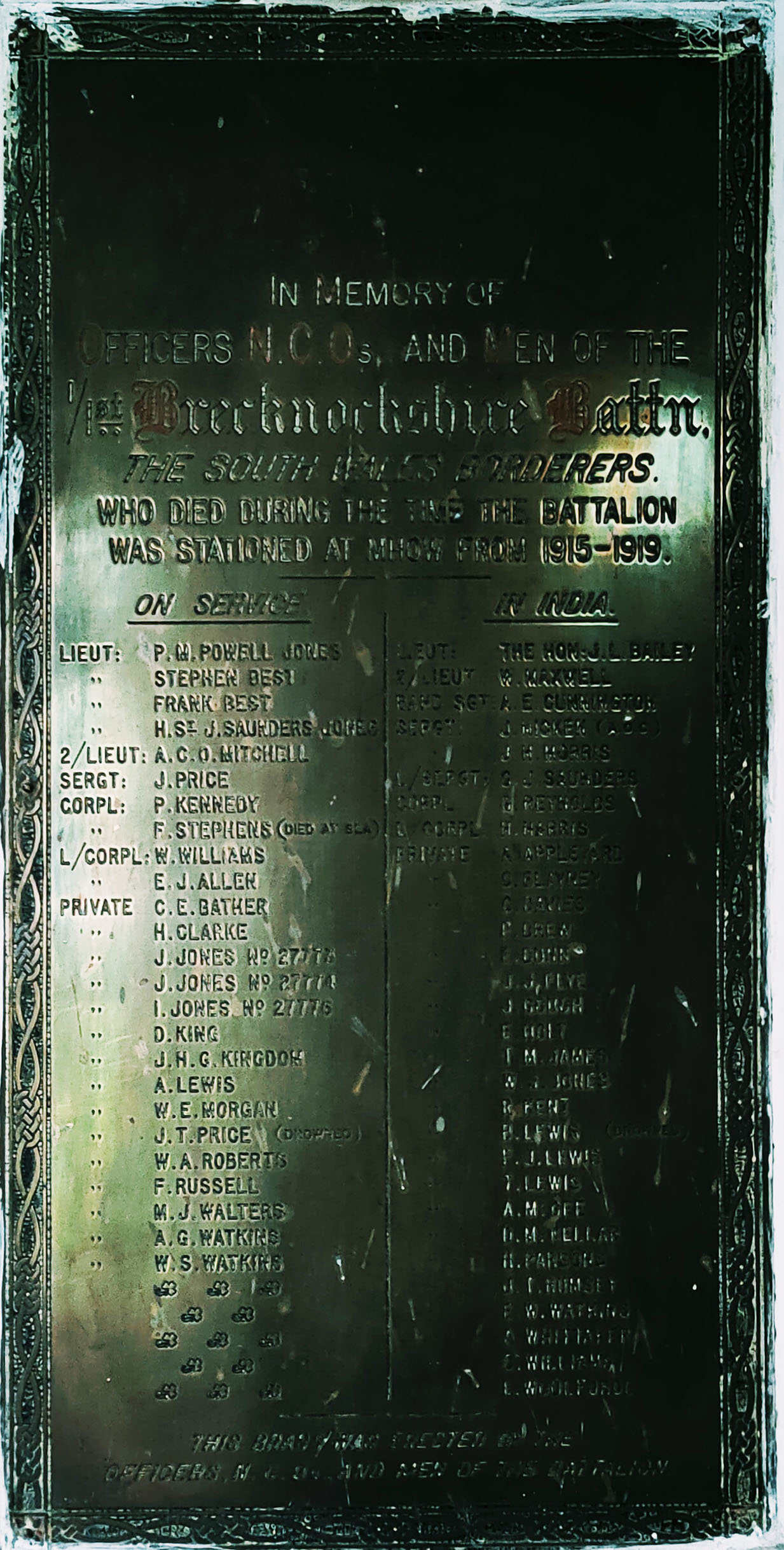
The memorial plaque erected at Mhow, India.

=== Memorials ===
A memorial tablet was erected at Aden listing the 19 men of the 1/1st Brecknockshire Bn who died while serving there in 1914–15. A brass plate was similarly put up in Christ Church, Mhow, listing the other officers and men who died while the battalion was serving in India, 1915–19.

=== Battle honours ===
The battalion was awarded the Battle honours South Africa, 1900–01 and Aden.

=== Honorary Colonels ===
The following served as Honorary Colonel of the battalion:

- Sir Joseph Bailey, 2nd Baronet of Glanusk, VD, (created Baron Glanusk in 1899), appointed 15 May 1867, died 1906
- Joseph Bailey, 2nd Baron Glanusk, CB, CBE, DSO, formerly Major, Grenadier Guards and 3rd (Royal South Wales Borderers Militia) Battalion, South Wales Borderers, appointed 1 June 1907; died 1928
- Wilfred Bailey, 3rd Baron Glanusk, DSO, formerly Colonel, Grenadier Guards, appointed (to 3rd (B&M Bn, Monmouths) 18 April 1934; continued as Hon Col of the 'Brecknock LAA Regiment', died 1948.
