= Barrack Hill =

Coordinates: 51.596894°N 3.003567°W

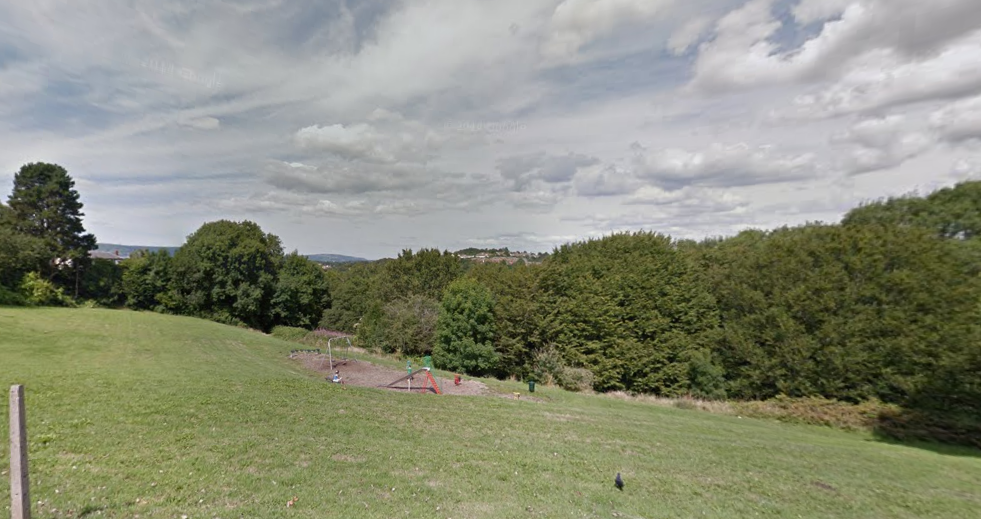
- The Park and Woodland in Barrack Hill

- Location within Newport
- Population: 1,409 (2011 census)
- OS grid reference: ST295885
- Principal area: Newport
- Country: Wales
- Sovereign state: United Kingdom
- Post town: NEWPORT
- Postcode district: NP20 5
- Dialling code: 01633; Savoy exchange
- Police: Gwent
- Fire: South Wales
- Ambulance: Welsh
- UK Parliament: Newport West

Barrack Hill is an area in Newport, Wales, located in the suburb, electoral ward and coterminous community parish of Allt-yr-yn. It is most well known for the Raglan Barracks, which stands on the top of the hill. Raglan Barracks is used for army training and is where the Newport army cadets are based.
