= Welsh Volunteers =

- Active: 1967–1971
- Country: United Kingdom
- Branch: British Army
- Type: Infantry
- Role: Line Infantry
- Size: Regiment
- Garrison/HQ: Maindy Barracks

The Welsh Volunteers, was a short-lived Territorial Army infantry regiment of the British Army, that existed from 1967 to 1971.

== History ==
Upon the creation of the TAVR in 1967, 5 of the Territorial Army infantry battalions of the Welsh Brigade, drastically reduced in size to form companies of the Welsh Volunteers. Its initial structure was:

- Headquarters Company, at Maindy Barracks, Cardiff
  (reduction of 6th Battalion, Welch Regiment)
- A Company (Royal Welch Fusiliers), at Wrexham
  (reduction of 4th Battalion, Royal Welch Fusiliers and part 6/7th Battalion, Royal Welch Fusiliers)
- B Company (South Wales Borderers), at Raglan Barracks, Newport
  (reduction of 2nd Battalion, Monmouthshire Regiment)
- C Company (Welch), at Pontypridd and Bridgend
  (reduction of 4th and 5th Battalions, Welch Regiment)

Not long after its creation, the regiment was disbanded with its sub-units being placed back under their respective regiments. HQ, B, and C Companies went to 3rd Battalion, Royal Regiment of Wales; and A and D Companies, went to 3rd Battalion, Royal Welch Fusiliers.
