= Monmouthshire Regiment =

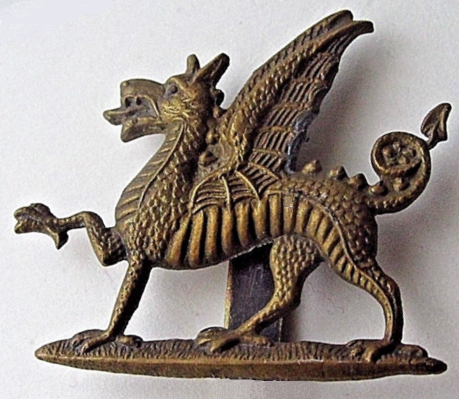
- Cap badge
- Active: 1908–1967
- Country: United Kingdom
- Branch: Territorial Army
- Type: Infantry
- Size: 1–10 battalions
- Engagements: Second Boer War; World War I World War II

The Monmouthshire Regiment was a Territorial infantry regiment of the British Army. Originating in units of rifle volunteers formed in Monmouthshire in 1859, the regiment served in the Second Anglo-Boer War and both World War I and World War II before losing its separate identity in 1967.

== Origins ==
Units of rifle volunteers were formed throughout Great Britain in 1859 and 1860 in response to a perceived threat of invasion by France following the Orsini affair. The raising of such units was to be authorised by lieutenants of counties in England, Wales and Scotland. The first corps in Monmouthshire was raised on 9 September 1859. By 1880 the various small corps in the county had been consolidated into three battalion-sized units, the 1st, 2nd and 3rd Monmouthshire Rifle Volunteer Corps. In the following year the Childers Reforms of line infantry saw the three Monmouthshire corps becoming volunteer battalions of the regular South Wales Borderers. In 1885 they were redesignated as the 2nd, 3rd and 4th Volunteer battalions of the South Wales Borderers (the 1st Volunteer Battalion being formed at the same time from the 1st Brecknockshire Rifle Volunteers).

Although the volunteer battalions saw no active service as units, during the Second Boer War they provided volunteer Active Service Companies to serve in South Africa, all of which were attached to the regular 2nd Battalion, South Wales Borderers, and they received the battle honour "South Africa 1900-02".

== Formation of the regiment ==
Reserve forces were reorganised under the Territorial and Reserve Forces Act 1907. Among other provisions the act abolished the Volunteer Force and replaced it with a new Territorial Force. Units were transferred, with changes in nomenclature, to the new force on 1 April 1908.

The three Monmouthshire volunteer battalions were redesignated (and partially reorganised) as battalions of a new territorial-only Monmouthshire Regiment:

- 1st (Rifle) Battalion. Based at Lower Dock Street in Newport and formed from the 2nd Volunteer Battalion
- 2nd Battalion. Based at Osborne Road in Pontypool (since demolished) and formed from the 3rd Volunteer Battalion
- 3rd Battalion. Based at Baker Street in Abergavenny and formed from the 4th Volunteer Battalion

The Territorial Force was organised into 14 infantry divisions, and the 1st-3rd Battalions of the Monmouthshire Regiment, along with the 1st Battalion, Herefordshire Regiment, formed the Welsh Border Brigade, part of the Welsh Division.

== First World War ==
With the outbreak of war in August 1914 the Territorial Force was mobilised. In all the Monmouthshire Regiment formed battalions, most of which fought on the Western Front, during the conflict as follows:

- 1/1st (Rifle) Battalion: redesignation of 1st Battalion in September 1914 on formation of second-line 2/1st Battalion. Transferred to 84th Brigade of the newly formed 28th Division in France in February 1915, it soon saw service in the Second Battle of Ypres, suffering severe casualties. In May 1915 it was temporarily amalgamated with the 1/2nd and 1/3rd Battalions at Vlamertinghe in Flanders to form a composite unit. Brought up to strength with replacements, the 1/1st resumed its own identity in August 1915. In September 1915 it was assigned to the 46th (North Midland) Division as a pioneer battalion. It remained with the division for the rest of the war, and was at Avesnes in northern France at the time of the Armistice of 11 November 1918.
- 2/1st (Rifle) Battalion: formed as a second-line duplicate of the 1st Battalion in Newport in September 1914. It did not move outside the United Kingdom, performing home defence duties, mostly in Suffolk, as part of the 53rd and 68th Divisions. It was disbanded at Lowestoft in March 1918.
- 3/1st (Rifle) Battalion: formed as a "third-line" duplicate of the 1st Battalion in February 1915. It remained in the United Kingdom (in Shropshire and Flintshire). In April 1916 it was redesignated as the 1st (Reserve) Battalion.
- 1/2nd Battalion: redesignation of 2nd Battalion in September 1914 on formation of second-line 2/2nd Battalion. Transferred to the 12th Brigade, 4th Division in France in November 1914. It spent the winter taking part in trench warfare near Armentières. It subsequently took part in the Second Battle of Ypres in April and May 1915, fighting alongside the 1/1st and 1/3rd Monmouths in the 28th Division. Such were the losses that the three battalions were temporarily amalgamated. By July 1915 the 1/2nd had been brought up to strength and resumed its own existence. It transferred to the 29th Division as a pioneer battalion. It stayed in this role for the rest of the conflict, ending the war near Renaix in Belgium. It formed part of the army of occupation of Germany before returning to Pontypool where it were disbanded in June 1919.
- 2/2nd Battalion: formed as a second-line duplicate of the 2nd Battalion in Pontypool in September 1914. Its service and stations were identical with those of the 2/1st Battalion. It was disbanded at Lowestoft in April 1918.
- 3/2nd Battalion: formed as a "third-line" duplicate of the 2nd Battalion in February 1915. Its service and stations were identical with those of the 3/1st Battalion. In April 1916 it was redesignated as the 2nd (Reserve) Battalion and in September 1916 was absorbed by the 1st (Reserve) Battalion.
- 1/3rd Battalion: redesignation of 3rd Battalion in September 1914 on formation of second-line 2/3rd Battalion. Transferred to the 83rd Brigade of the newly formed 28th Division in France in February 1915, fought alongside 1/1st and 1/2nd Battalions at the Second Battle of Ypres, due to losses it was temporarily amalgamated with the 1/1st and 1/2nd Battalions. Brought up to strength with replacements, the 1/3rd resumed its own identity in August 1915. In September 1915 it was assigned to the 49th (West Riding) Division as a pioneer battalion. In 1916 it became GHQ troops. Due to the fact that many men in Monmouthshire were engaged in the vital wartime industries of coal-mining and steel making, it was found increasingly difficult to find drafts to reinforce the battalion, and on 31 August 1916 it was disbanded with troops transferred to the 1/1st and 1/2nd Battalions.
- 2/3rd Battalion: formed as a second-line duplicate of the 3rd Battalion in Abergavenny in September 1914. Its service and stations were identical with those of the 2/1st and 2/2nd Battalions. It was disbanded at Herringfleet in August 1917, with troops transferred to 2/1st and 2/2nd Battalions.
- 3/3rd Battalion: formed as a "third-line" duplicate of the 3rd Battalion in February 1915. Its service and stations were identical with those of the 3/1st Battalion. In April 1916 it was redesignated as the 3rd (Reserve) Battalion and in September 1916 was absorbed by the 1st (Reserve) Battalion.
- 4th Battalion: a redesignation of the 48th Provisional Battalion, Territorial Force in January 1917. This unit had been formed in June 1915 from personnel of the Monmouthshire and Herefordshire Regiment who were ineligible for service overseas. Stationed in Norfolk.

== Inter-war ==
All units of the Territorial Force were disbanded soon after the end of the war in 1918 and 1919. Early in 1920 recruitment restarted and in October 1920 the force was renamed to the Territorial Army. The three battalions were reconstituted in February 1920:

- 1st (Rifle) Battalion at Newport
- 2nd Battalion at Pontypool
- 3rd Battalion at Abergavenny

In 1921 it was announced that there would be a reduction in the size of the Territorial Army with a number of pairs of infantry battalions amalgamated. The 3rd Battalion was amalgamated with the Brecknockshire Battalion, South Wales Borderers to become the 3rd (Brecknockshire and Monmouthshire) Battalion, The Monmouthshire Regiment in 1922.

In 1938 and 1939 there was a reorganisation of the Territorial Army as the threat of a new European war re-emerged. Many infantry battalions were converted to an anti-aircraft role: in 1938 the 1st Battalion became a searchlight regiment as 1st (Rifle) Battalion, The Monmouthshire Regiment (68th Searchlight Regiment).

In March 1939 it was announced that the size of the TA was to be doubled, with each existing unit forming a duplicate. By June 1939 the regiment comprised four battalions:

- 1st (Rifle) Battalion (68th Searchlight Regiment)
- 2nd Battalion
- 3rd Battalion (the amalgamation with the Brecknockshire Battalion had ended with the formation of a duplicate battalion)
- 4th Battalion (duplicate of the 2nd Battalion.)

== Second World War ==
=== 1st (Rifle) Battalion ===
On 1 August 1940 all the infantry battalions that had converted to anti-aircraft roles transferred to the Royal Artillery (RA) and from that date ceased to be part of the corps of their parent regiments. 68th Searchlight Regiment (which regained its Monmouthshire Regiment subtitle in 1942) served through the war in Anti-Aircraft Command until in November 1944 it reverted to infantry as 68th (Monmouthshire) Garrison Regiment, RA (later 609 (Monmouthshire) Regiment, RA) and carried out duties on the Lines of Communication for 21st Army Group in North West Europe.

=== 2nd Battalion ===
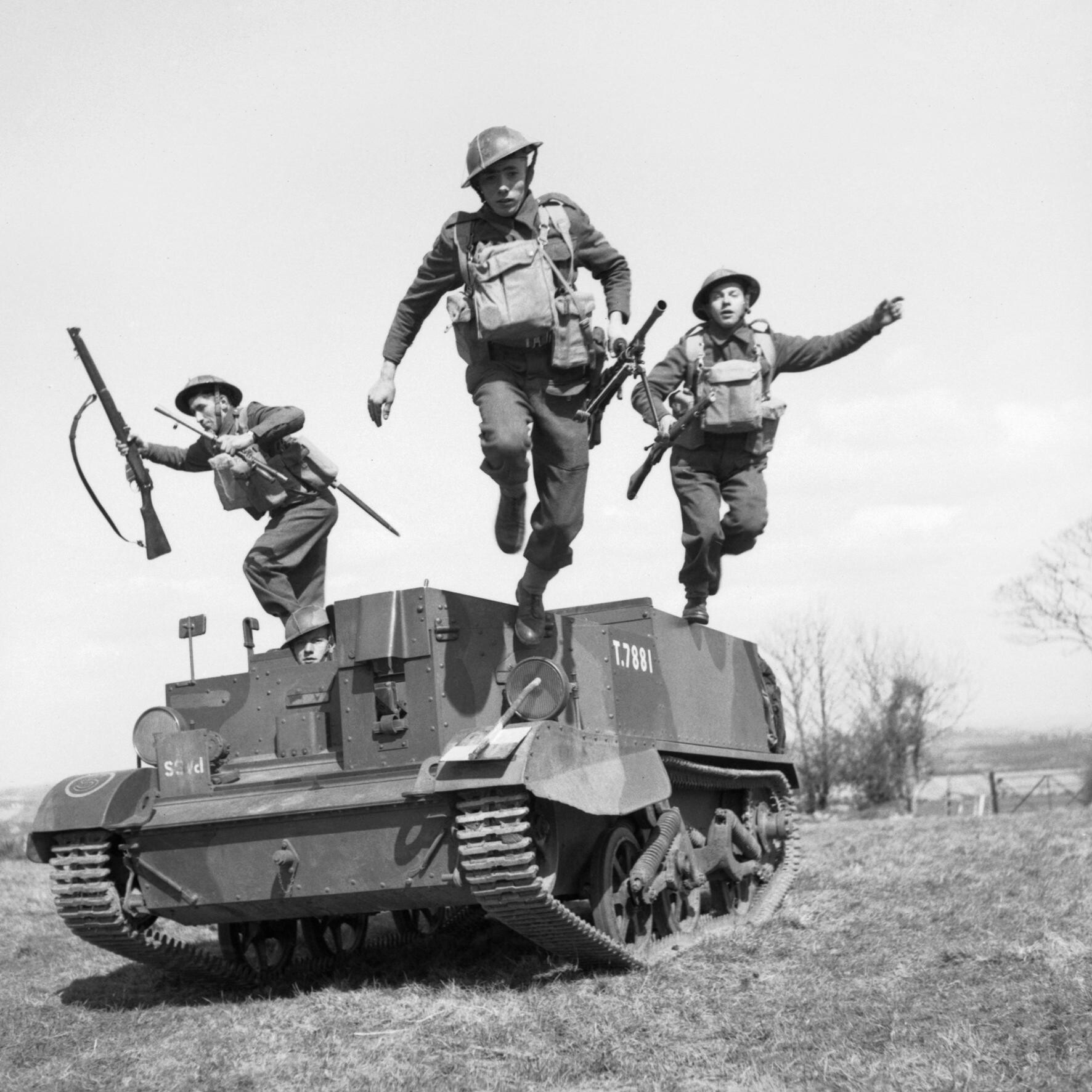
Men of the 2nd Monmouthshire Regiment, part of the 160th Infantry Brigade of the 53rd (Welsh) Infantry Division, leap from their Universal Carrier during an exercise near Newry in Northern Ireland, 26 April 1941

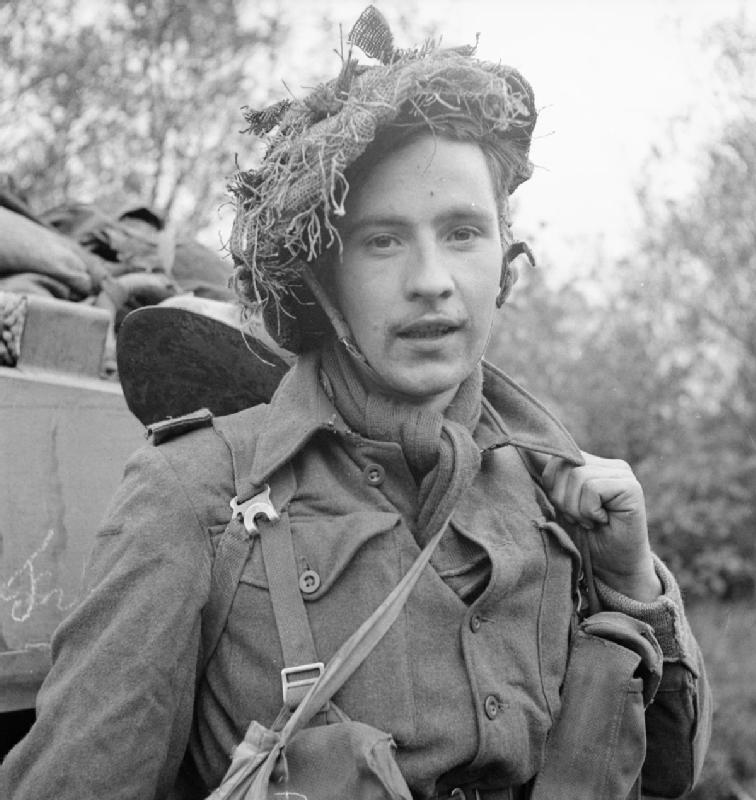
Private A. Anderson of the 2nd Battalion, Monmouthshire Regiment, during the assault on Venraij, 17 October 1944

The 2nd Battalion was mobilised on the outbreak of war in September 1939, as part of 160th Infantry Brigade, which also included the 1/4th and 1/5th battalions of the Welch Regiment, attached to the 53rd (Welsh) Infantry Division. After a long period of training in Northern Ireland and England, they landed in Normandy on 28 June 1944, twenty-two days after the initial D-Day landings, with the rest of 53rd Division and fought in the Normandy Campaign in the Battle for Caen. Soon after arrival, they took part in Operation Epsom, spending two weeks in trenches between Hill 112 and the River Odon.

They next saw action in the Battle of the Falaise Gap in August 1944, where the battalion suffered heavy casualties and 'A' and 'B' Companies had to be amalgamated. 'B' Company was soon reformed again from a large number of men from the now disbanded 5th East Lancashire Regiment of the 59th (Staffordshire) Infantry Division. The battalion later advanced with the 53rd (Welsh) Division, liberating Merville and crossing into the Netherlands. By October they had reached the Nederrijn and took part in the attack on 's-Hertogenbosch.

In December 1944 they took part in the counter offensive against the German advances in the Ardennes forest. In January 1945 they moved to The Netherlands for a period of training prior to Operation Veritable, also known as the Battle of the Reichswald. They entered Germany on 8 February, taking part in a month's heavy fighting and suffering 300 casualties before being withdrawn for rest.

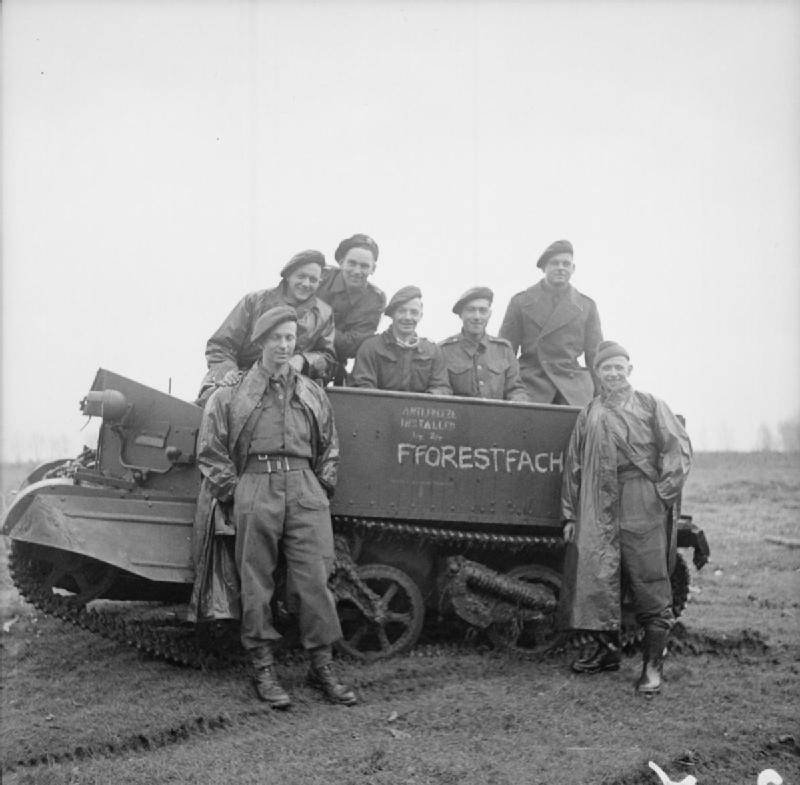
Men of the carrier platoon of the 3rd Battalion, Monmouthshire Regiment, part of 159th Infantry Brigade of the 11th Armoured Division, February 1945

The battalion continued to advance across Germany, forcing a crossing of the River Aller at Rethem on 11 April 1945. This was their last major action of the war: they were at Hamburg when the German Instrument of Surrender came into effect. Later, the battalion was sent to Italy in November and was disbanded the following September.

=== 3rd Battalion ===
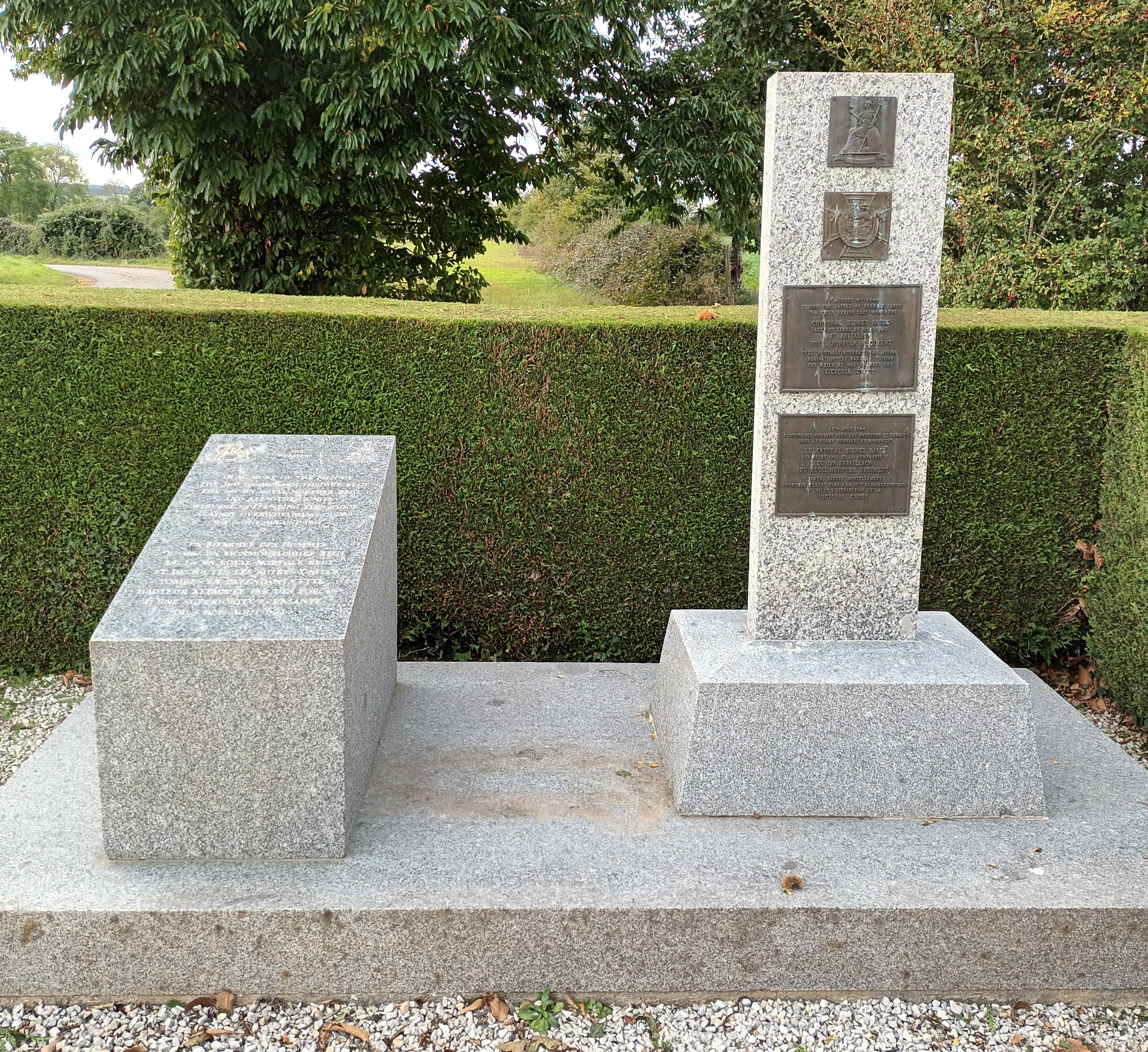
Memorial at Pavée in the commune of Viessoix.

The 3rd Battalion was mobilised at the same time as the 2nd Battalion as part of the 159th Infantry Brigade, alongside the 4th Battalion, King's Shropshire Light Infantry and the 1st Battalion, Herefordshire Regiment, part of the 53rd (Welsh) Infantry Division and trained alongside it in Northern Ireland and England. In May 1942 the battalion, together with the rest of the 159th Brigade, were transferred to the 11th Armoured Division and trained for another two years before, on 14 June 1944, the battalion landed in Normandy, just eight days after D-Day. They spent several weeks attempting to break out of the bridgehead in the vicinity of Caen as part of Operation Goodwood and Operation Bluecoat. On 5 August they were nearly surrounded by enemy forces on Bas Perrier Ridge and suffered heavy casualties and were reduced to half strength, forcing them to temporarily amalgamate with the 1st Battalion, Royal Norfolk Regiment of the 185th Brigade, of 3rd Division, which was temporarily attached to the 11th Armoured. It was during the fighting that eventually lead to Corporal Sidney Bates, of the 1st Royal Norfolks, being posthumously awarded the Victoria Cross. The memorial in Viessoix states "In memory of the men of the 3rd Bn Monmouthshire Regt, The 1st Bn Royal Norfolk Regt and all other units who died defending this ridge against overwhelming odds, 5th to 10th August 1944."

Reinforced, the battalion advanced after the retreating German forces, passing through Belgium and taking part in the liberation of Antwerp in early September 1944. They moved into the Netherlands as part of the force protecting the flanks of the airborne troops that had landed in Operation Market Garden. The commanding officer of the battalion, Lieutenant Colonel Hubert Gerald Orr, was killed on 25 September 1944 at Sint Anthonis along with the Commanding Officer of the 3rd Royal Tank Regiment. In November 1944 they took part in the Battle of Broekhuizen (also known as the Battle of the Venlo Pocket).

In February 1945 they broke through the Schlieffen line after which they were withdrawn to Belgium where they were re-equipped for the advance into Germany. In April 1945 they crossed the Rhine into the Teutoburg Forest where they had the task of clearing the road to Ibbenbüren. The battalion encountered very heavy resistance and failed to achieve its objective. Corporal Edward Thomas Chapman was awarded the Victoria Cross for his actions during this action.

Such were the battalion's casualties (40 killed in action, 80 wounded) that it took no further part in the conflict and was replaced in the 159th Brigade by the 1st Battalion, Cheshire Regiment. The battalion was transferred to the 115th Independent Infantry Brigade. It was disbanded in January 1946. Throughout the whole campaign, the battalion had suffered 1,156 casualties, including 67 officers, 25 killed, and 1,089 other ranks, with 242 (of 267?) of them paying the ultimate price.

=== 4th Battalion ===
The 4th Battalion, which had been created on 1 June 1939 as a duplicate of the 2nd Battalion, was mobilised in August 1939 as part of 113th Infantry Brigade, serving with the 15th and 2/5th Welch Regiment, part of the 38th (Welsh) Infantry Division, which was itself formed as a duplicate of the 53rd (Welsh) Infantry Division. The battalion did not leave the United Kingdom, performing guard duty and acting as a training unit. On 12 December 1942 it was redesignated the 1st Battalion, South Wales Borderers; the original 1st SWB having been disbanded after most of the unit was captured in North Africa.

== Post War to amalgamation ==
All Territorial and war-formed units were disbanded soon after the end of the war. The Territorial Army was re-established in April 1947, although there was a considerable reconfiguration with some pre-war units not reformed, or converted to a different role. The Monmouthshire Regiment was reduced to a single battalion: the 2nd Battalion, based in Pontypool.

The former 1st (Rifle) Battalion did not return to the regiment after the war, but remained in Anti-Aircraft Command as 603rd (1st Battalion, The Monmouthshire Regiment) (Mixed) Heavy Anti-Aircraft Regiment, Royal Artillery ('Mixed' indicating that members of the Women's Royal Army Corps were integrated into the regiment). It continued to wear the distinctive silver or white metal cap badge of the 1st (Rifle) Bn, Monmouths, together with the Royal Artillery's collar badges. In addition, the buttons and non-commissioned officers' chevrons were black, to denote the unit's ancestry as a Rifle battalion. After the abolition of AA Command on 10 March 1955, the regiment formed 'P' (1 Monmouth) Battery in 283rd (Monmouthshire) Field Regiment, Royal Artillery, later 'R' (1 Monmouth) Battery in a combined 282nd (Glamorgan and Monmouthshire) Field Regiment, Royal Artillery. When the TA was reduced into the Territorial and Army Volunteer Reserve (TAVR) in 1967, 282 Regiment became 211 (South Wales) Battery in 104th Light Air Defence Regiment, Royal Artillery, with D (Monmouthshire) Troop at Newport.

The 3rd Battalion was converted to form 637th (3rd Bn The Monmouthshire Regiment) Heavy Anti-Aircraft Regiment, Royal Artillery (TA) and similarly ceased to be part of the regiment. It was eventually amalgamated in 1955 with 638th (Brecknock) Light Anti-Aircraft Regiment, Royal Artillery (TA) and ceased to exist as a separate unit.

In 1967 the remaining battalion was disbanded. A new unit, the Welsh Volunteers, continued the lineage of all Welsh territorial infantry battalions. The successor unit today is the 3rd Battalion, the Royal Welsh.

== Battle honours ==
The regiment was awarded the following battle honours. Those shown in bold type were selected for display on the colours or appointments.

- **South Africa 1900-02**
- **Ypres 1915 '17 '18**
- Gravenstafel
- **St. Julien**
- Frezenberg
- Bellewaarde
- **Somme 1916**
- Albert 1916
- **Arras 1917**
- **Scarpe 1917**
- Pilckem
- **Langemarck 1917**
- Poelcappelle
- **Cambrai 1917 '18**
- Lys
- Messines 1918
- **Hindenburg Line**
- St. Quentin Canal
- Beaurevoir
- Courtrai
- Sambre
- **France and Flanders 1914-18**
- **Aden**
- **Odon**
- **Bourguébus Ridge**
- Mont Pincon
- Souleuvre
- **Le Perier Ridge**
- **Falaise**
- **Antwerp**
- Nederrijn
- **Lower Maas**
- Venlo Pocket
- **Ourthe**
- **Rhineland**
- Reichswald
- Weeze
- Hochwald
- Rhine
- **Ibbenburen**
- **Aller**
- North-West Europe 1944–45

== Bibliography ==
- J.B.M. Frederick, Lineage Book of British Land Forces 1660–1978, Vol I, Wakefield, Microform Academic, 1984, ISBN 1-85117-007-3.
- J.B.M. Frederick, Lineage Book of British Land Forces 1660–1978, Vol II, Wakefield, Microform Academic, 1984, ISBN 1-85117-009-X.
- Joslen, H. F. (2003) [1960]. Orders of Battle: Second World War, 1939–1945. Uckfield, East Sussex: Naval and Military Press. ISBN 978-1-84342-474-1.
- Norman E.H. Litchfield, The Territorial Artillery 1908–1988 (Their Lineage, Uniforms and Badges), Nottingham: Sherwood Press, 1992, ISBN 0-9508205-2-0.
- Margesson, John (1977). A Short History of the Regiment of Wales (24th/41st Foot). Royal Regiment of Wales.
