= Baker Street drill hall, Abergavenny =

Baker Street drill hall
- Abergavenny
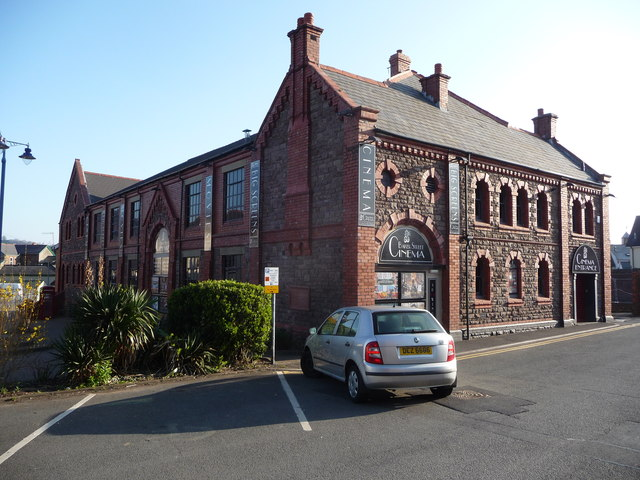
- Baker Street drill hall

Site information
- Type: Drill hall

Location
- Location in Monmouthshire
- Coordinates: 51.82338°N 3.02090°W

Site history
- Built: 1896
- Built for: War Office
- In use: 1896 – 1960s

The Baker Street drill hall is a former military installation in Abergavenny in Wales.

== History ==
The building was designed as the headquarters of the 4th Volunteer Battalion, The South Wales Borderers and was completed in 1896. This unit evolved to become the 3rd Battalion, The Monmouthshire Regiment in 1908. The battalion was mobilised at the drill hall in August 1914 before being deployed to the Western Front.

The battalion converted to become the 637th Heavy Anti-Aircraft Regiment, Royal Artillery (3rd Battalion The Monmouthshire Regiment) in 1947 and evolved to become the 638th (Brecknockshire and Monmouthshire) Light Anti-Aircraft Regiment, Royal Artillery in 1955. In 1967, further reductions took place and, when the Monmouthshire line was taken up by 211 (South Wales) Battery, 104th Light Air Defence Regiment, that unit was based at Raglan Barracks in Newport. The Baker Street drill hall was then decommissioned and subsequently converted for retail use before becoming a cinema in 2010.
