= Ridgeway, Newport =

Coordinates: 51.588879°N 3.020835°W

Ridgeway
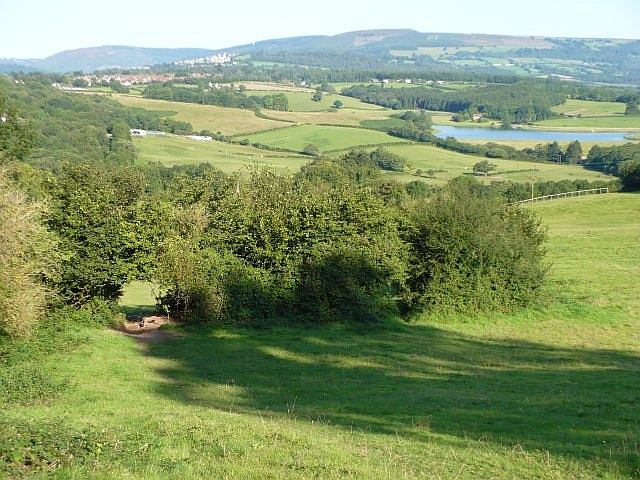
- A view from the top of the Ridgeway

- Location within Newport
- Population: 1,513
- OS grid reference: ST334870
- Community: Allt-yr-yn
- Principal area: Newport
- Country: Wales
- Sovereign state: United Kingdom
- Post town: NEWPORT
- Postcode district: NP20 9
- Dialling code: 01633; Savoy exchange
- Police: Gwent
- Fire: South Wales
- Ambulance: Welsh
- UK Parliament: Newport West

Ridgeway is an area in Newport, Wales, in the electoral ward and community of Allt-yr-yn. It is well known for its ridge which overlooks Rogerstone and the nearby woodland areas. Ridgeway is at the end of the estate the main road breaks off onto the M4 motorway.

Ridgeway is a predominantly middle class area in Newport, Gwent. Alongside the neighbouring Alt-yr-yn and has historically been a highly sought after area of Newport due to its catchment proximity of schools such as Glasllwch Primary, which has an Estyn “Excellent” rating, and up until its move in 2009, the independent Rougemont School.

The estate consists of mainly 1920s housing with generous gardens and wide streets. Local amenities include the Ridgeway Inn and Ridgeway Cafe.

The area has earned the nickname of “Little Switzerland” due to the generous panoramic views and style of housing.

== Gallery ==
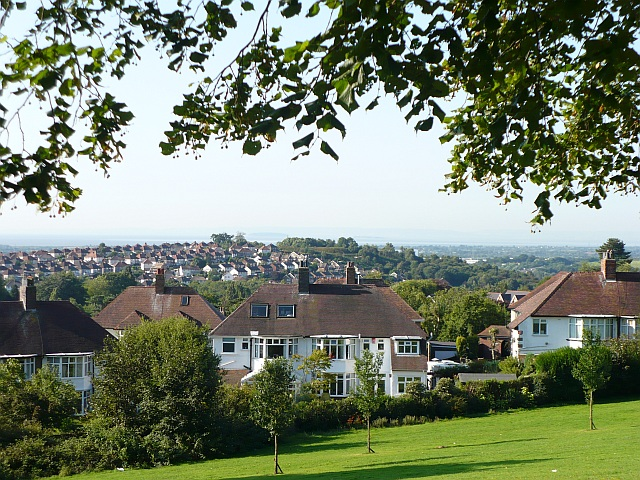
View southwest from Ridgeway

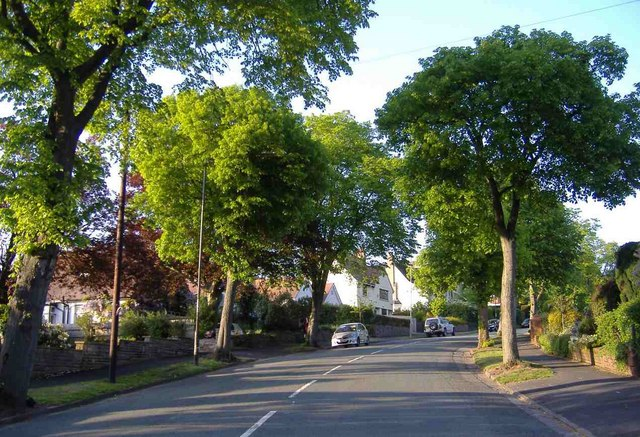
Ridgeway, Newport

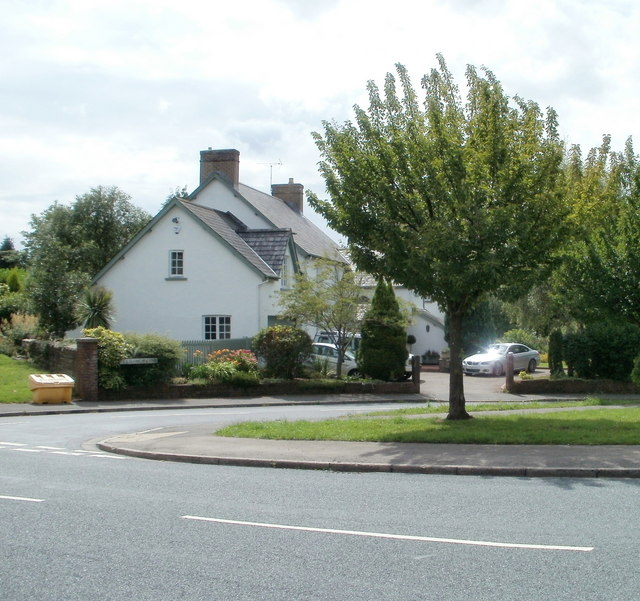
Glasllwch Lane

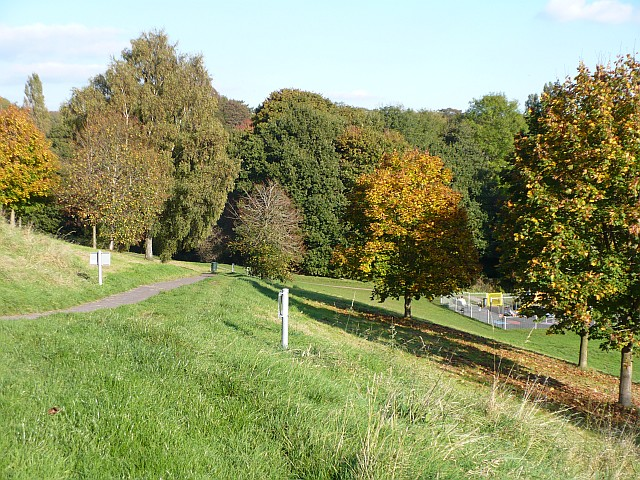
Coed Melyn Wood

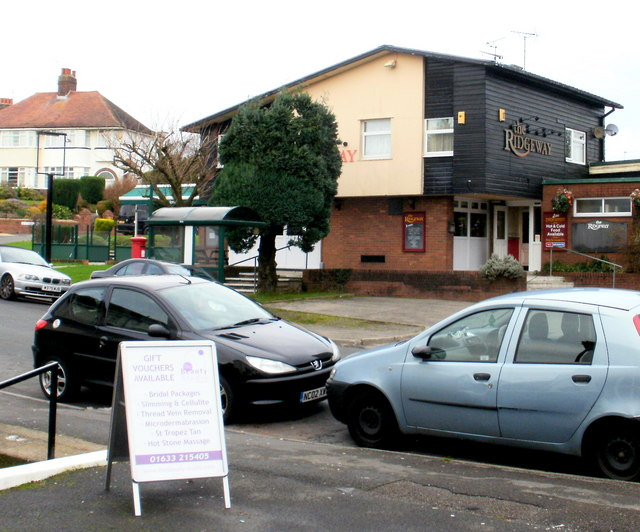
Ridgeway pub

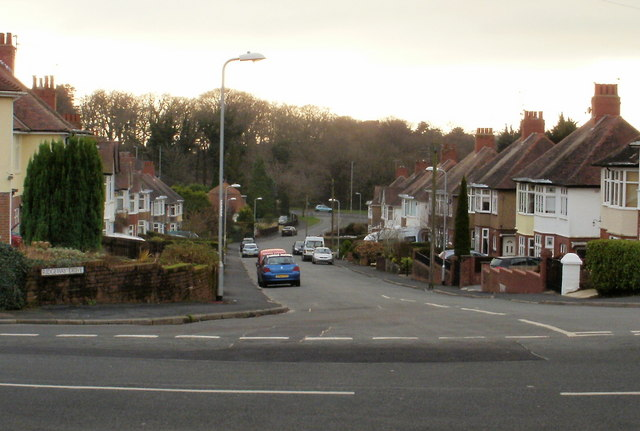
Ridgeway Drive

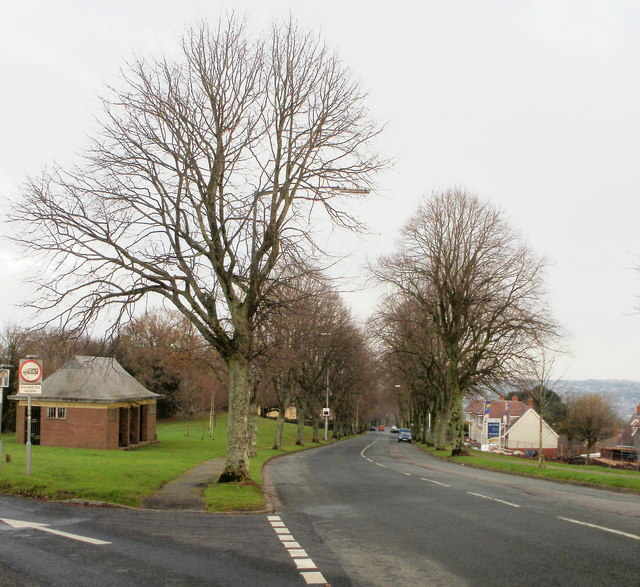
Allt-yr-yn Avenue

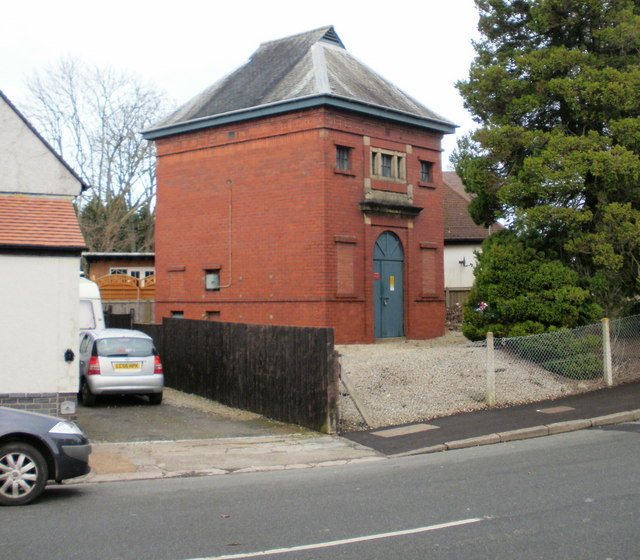
Electricity substation

== See also ==
- Newport, Wales
