= Battle of Broekhuizen =

1944 battle of WW2 in the Netherlands

- Part of the Western Front of World War II
Date	27–30 November 1944
Location	Broekhuizen, Netherlands 51°29′7″N 6°9′48″E
Result	British victory

Belligerents
United Kingdom	Germany

Strength
300	200

Casualties and losses
43 killed 140 wounded	17–60 killed 139 captured

The Battle of Broekhuizen, a Dutch village near the Meuse, was a small but bloody battle which took place late in 1944 as part of the Allied campaign to liberate the left bank of the Meuse in the Netherlands (Peel marshes).

== Background ==
In the fighting, which took place near the end of November 1944, the German units at Broekhuizen were initially contained by the 15th (Scottish) Infantry Division. The Germans had made a fortress out of Broekhuizen, which was one of three slim - but important - footholds they held on the left side of the Meuse at the time. The Germans occupied the houses and cellars of the village, and also the village's Kasteel - a thick-walled medieval Manor House surrounded by a moat, situated a few hundred metres to the west of the village. They built an elaborate trench system, laid an extensive minefield, and were supported by artillery from the other side of the river.

== Battle ==
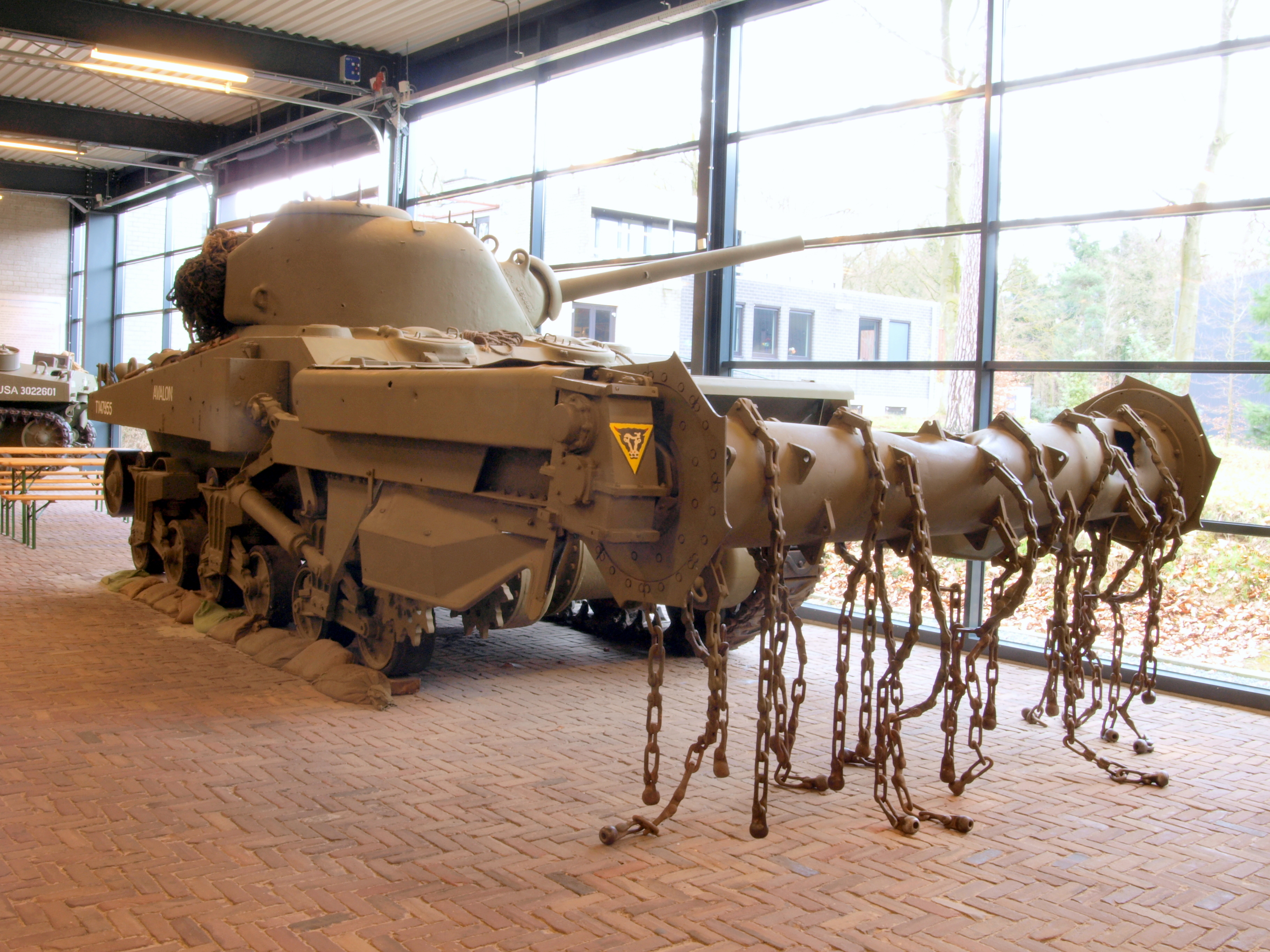
Sherman Crab used in the battle on display in Overloon War Museum

On the night of 27 November, the 9th Cameronians (Scottish Rifles) attacked the Kasteel, held by German parachutists of 6 Kompanie, Fallschirmjäger-Regiment 20. The strength of the parachutists' defence was underestimated, and the attempt to storm the building was unsuccessful. Over half the attackers were killed, wounded or taken prisoner.

The following day, the Scots were relieved by the 3rd Battalion of the Monmouthshire Regiment, which formed part of the 11th Armoured Division (United Kingdom). At dawn on 30 November, after a day of planning and preparation, the 3rd Monmouths set out to attack both the Kasteel (A Company) and the village of Broekhuizen (C Company) over flat terrain from woods just to the south. Both companies had to negotiate the minefield, withering German machine gunfire from the Kasteel, and mortars and shells fired from the other side of the Meuse. 3rd Mons were joined in this effort by artillery support, thirty tanks of B and C Squadrons, the 15th/19th The King's Royal Hussars (also of 11th Armoured), and twelve Mine flail tanks of A Squadron the Westminster Dragoons brought in from 79th Armoured Division (United Kingdom). The Hussars shelled German positions from the woods, and the Dragoons cleared a path through the minefield with the Monmouths following behind. The attack stalled against the extremely well dug-in Germans, and terrible casualties were inflicted on the Monmouths once the cover provided by the Dragoons' flail tanks was gone. D Company 3rd Mons had to be brought in from reserve to take over the attack on the village from C Company. 3rd Mons' Commanding Officer, Lieutenant-Colonel Stockley, was killed leading the attack on the Kasteel and so the Hussars' commanding officer, Colonel Taylor, took leadership of the British effort to break the bloody stalemate. This was achieved by dusk as a result of the Hussars' supporting tanks pummelling the Kasteel walls with high explosive from close range, and the new impetus provided by D Company, which was able to reach the village and clear it house-to-house with relatively few casualties.

The Kasteel and village were destroyed during the battle, with the German garrison finally capitulating a few days later after a short period of sporadic resistance. By this time, the stricken 3rd Mons had in turn been relieved by 4th King's Shropshire Light Infantry. The Monmouths were taken out of the line until 17 December for reinforcement.

== Aftermath ==
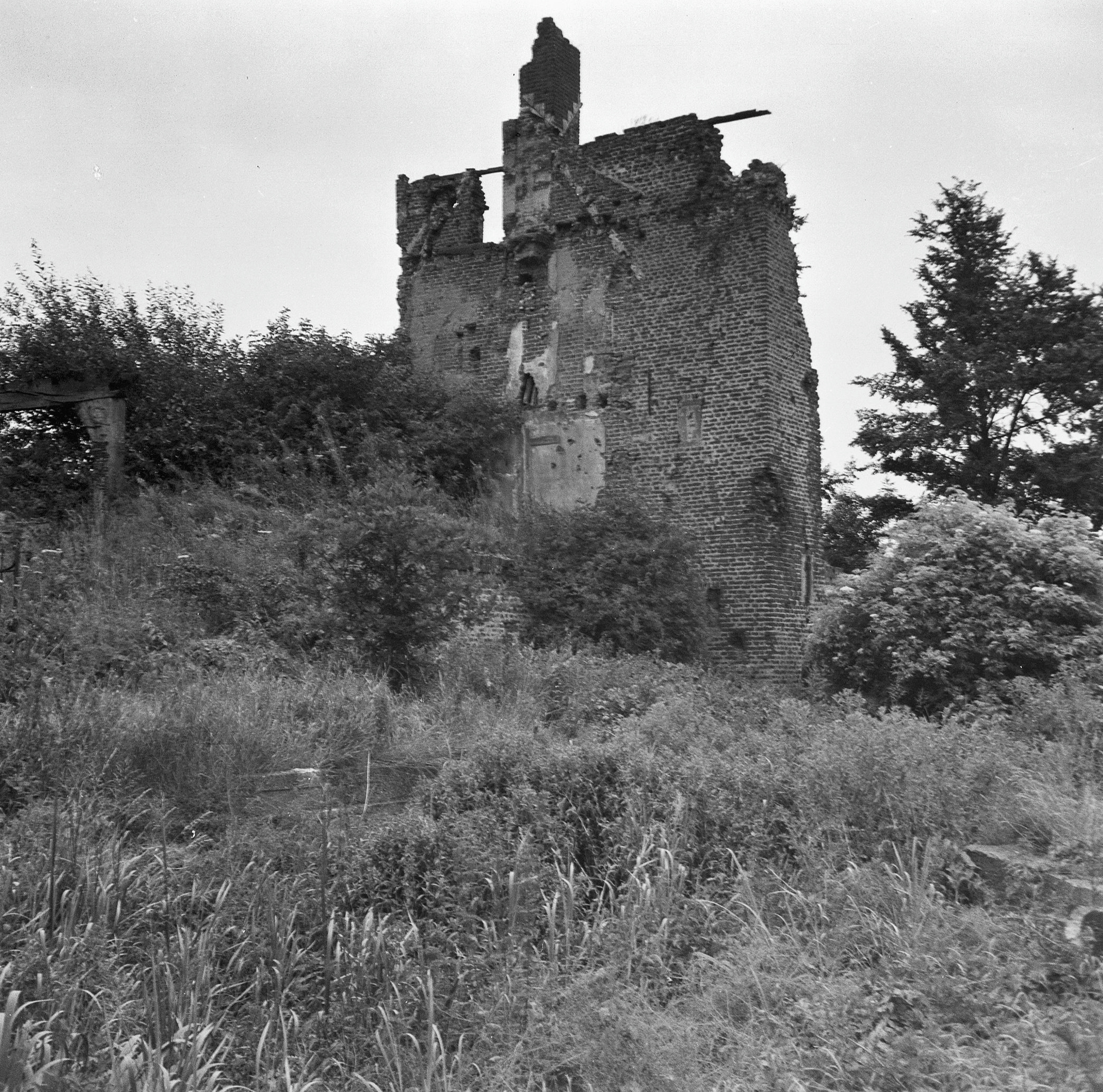
Castle ruins pictured in the 1950s

Victory came at a heavy cost. On the British side, the 3rd Mons' A and C Companies suffered 70 per cent casualties. Of the 300 British soldiers present overall, there were 140 killed and wounded. On the German side 139 prisoners of war were made, although numerous parties of Germans escaped across the Meuse. German casualty estimates range from 17 to 60 killed.

== Remembrance ==
The war memorial at Broekhuizen is situated on the north wall of the Sint Nicolaaskerk churchyard. It was unveiled on the 50th anniversary of the battle, and lists 42 British soldiers killed between 27 and 30 November 1944. There are 11 names of the 15th Scottish Division and 31 names of the 11th Armoured Division.

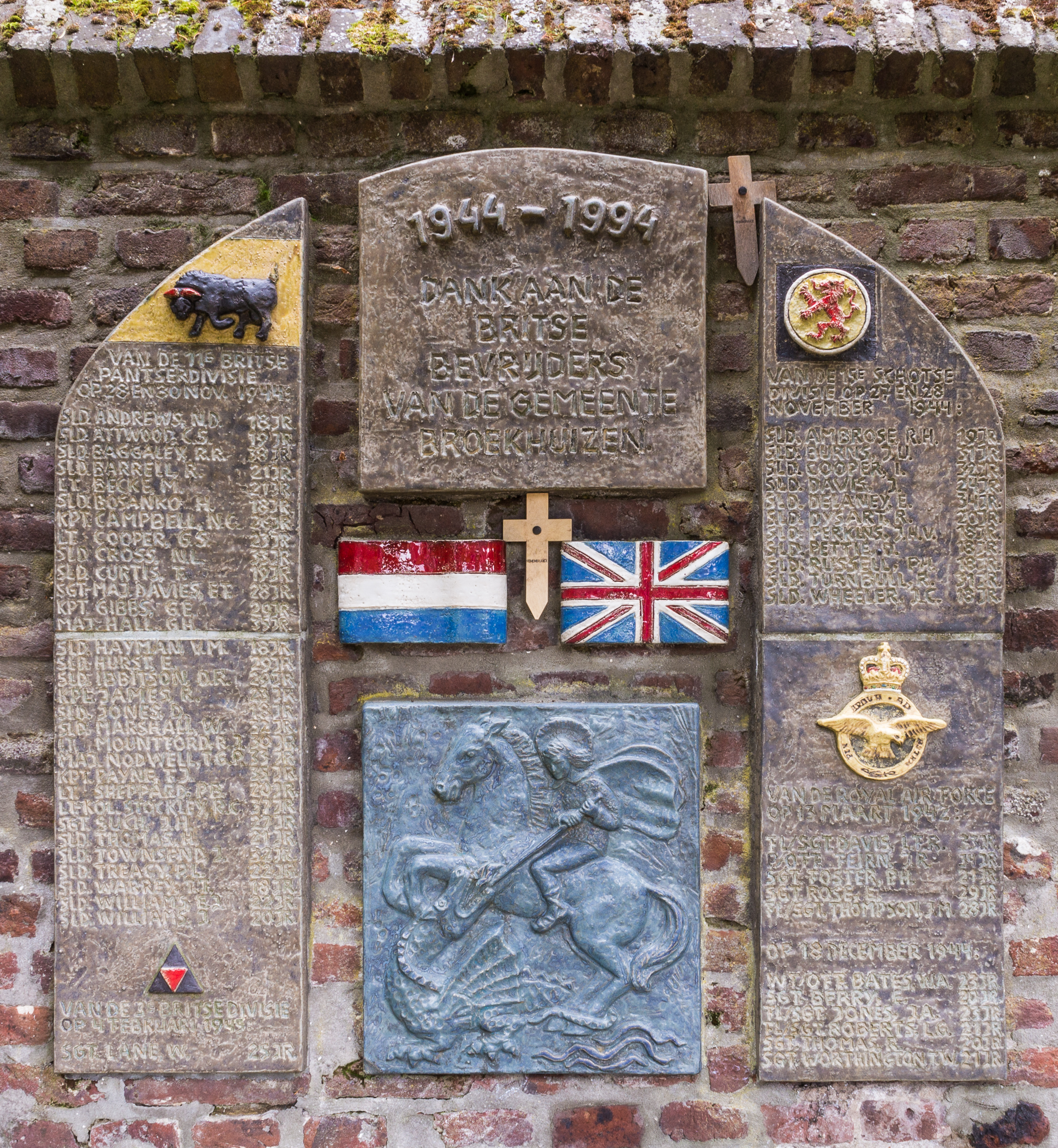
The War Memorial at Broekhuizen

During the action, one of the Westminster Dragoons flail tanks was knocked out by a Panzerfaust. It now stands at the Overloon War Museum.
