= Broekhuizen, Limburg =

Broekhuizen Brokeze
- Village
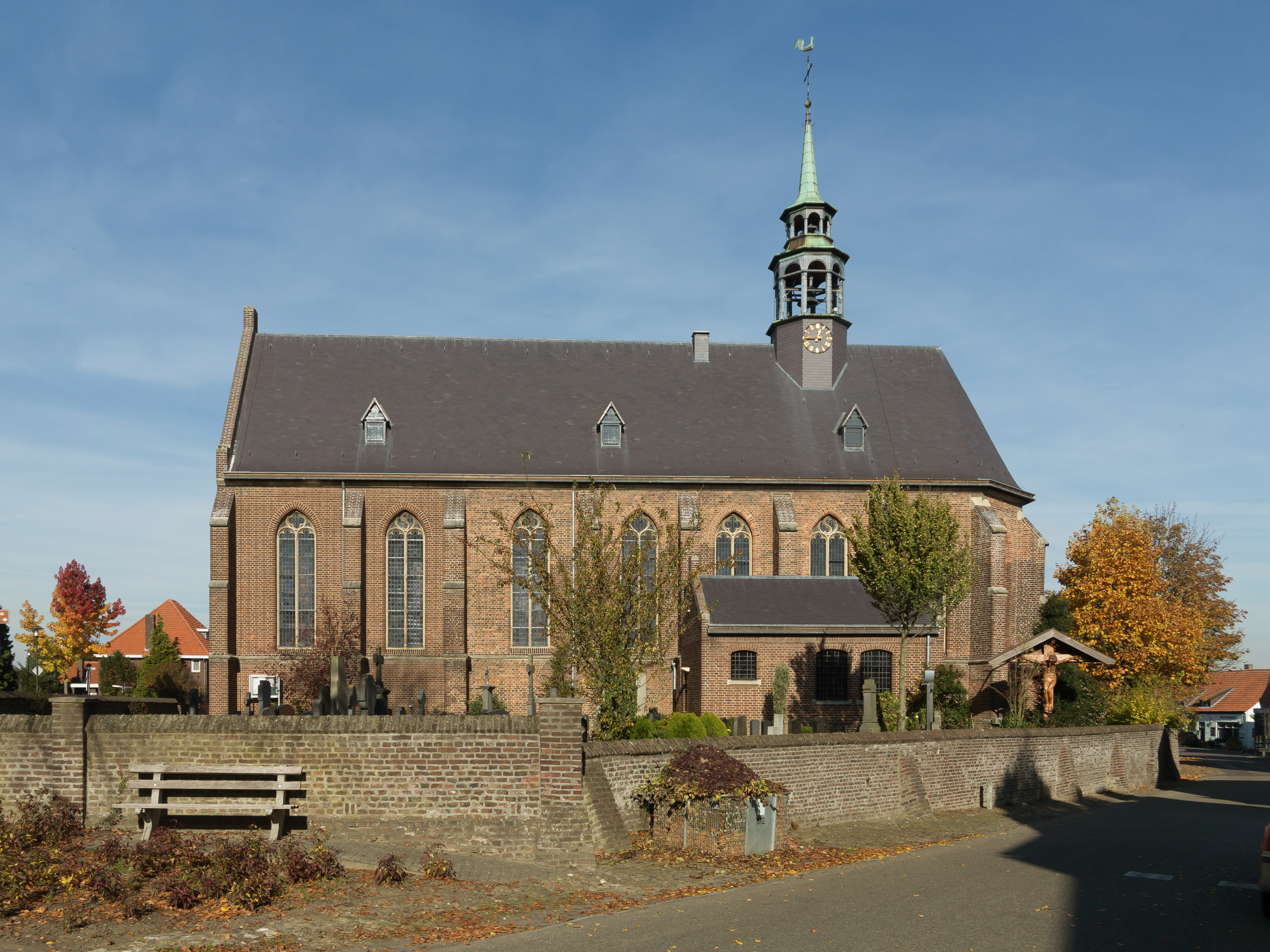
- St Nicolaas Church, Broekhuizen

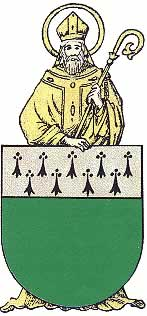
- Flag Coat of arms

- Location in the Netherlands Location in the province of Limburg in the Netherlands
- Coordinates: 51°29′7″N 6°9′48″E
- Country: Netherlands
- Province: Limburg
- Municipality: Horst aan de Maas

Area
  - Total: 5.74 km^{2} (2.22 sq mi)
- Elevation: 17 m (56 ft)

Population (2021)
  - Total: 1,050
  - Density: 183/km^{2} (474/sq mi)
- Time zone: UTC+1 (CET)
  - Summer (DST): UTC+2 (CEST)
- Postal code: 5871
- Dialing code: 077

Broekhuizen is a village in the Dutch province of Limburg. It is a part of the municipality of Horst aan de Maas, and lies about 14 km north of Venlo.

== History ==
The village was first mentioned in 1246 as Iohanne de Bruchusen, and means "houses near swampy land". Broekhuizen developed on the Maas in the Early Middle Ages. It used to be part of the Land van Kessel. In 1323, it became part of the Duchy of Guelders. In 1484, it became an independent parish. In 1648, it became part of the Spanish Netherlands. In 1713, it belonged to Prussia, and finally in 1815, it became part of the Kingdom of the Netherlands.

The St Nicolaas is a single-aisled church which was built around 1500. After a fire in 1862, it was extensively restored in 1885 and 1886. It was damaged in 1944, and partially rebuilt in 1951–1952.

The Broekhuizen castle had been known to exist since the 13th century. A tower was built around 1473, and in 1732 a manor house was attached to the tower. The castle was restored in 1399, but was destroyed during the Battle of Broekhuizen in 1944. German fallschirmjäger had taken possession of the castle and were attacked by the British Army. The remains except for the cellar were later demolished in 1990.

Broekhuizen was home to 210 people in 1840. It was a separate municipality until 2001, when it was merged with Horst aan de Maas.

== Gallery ==
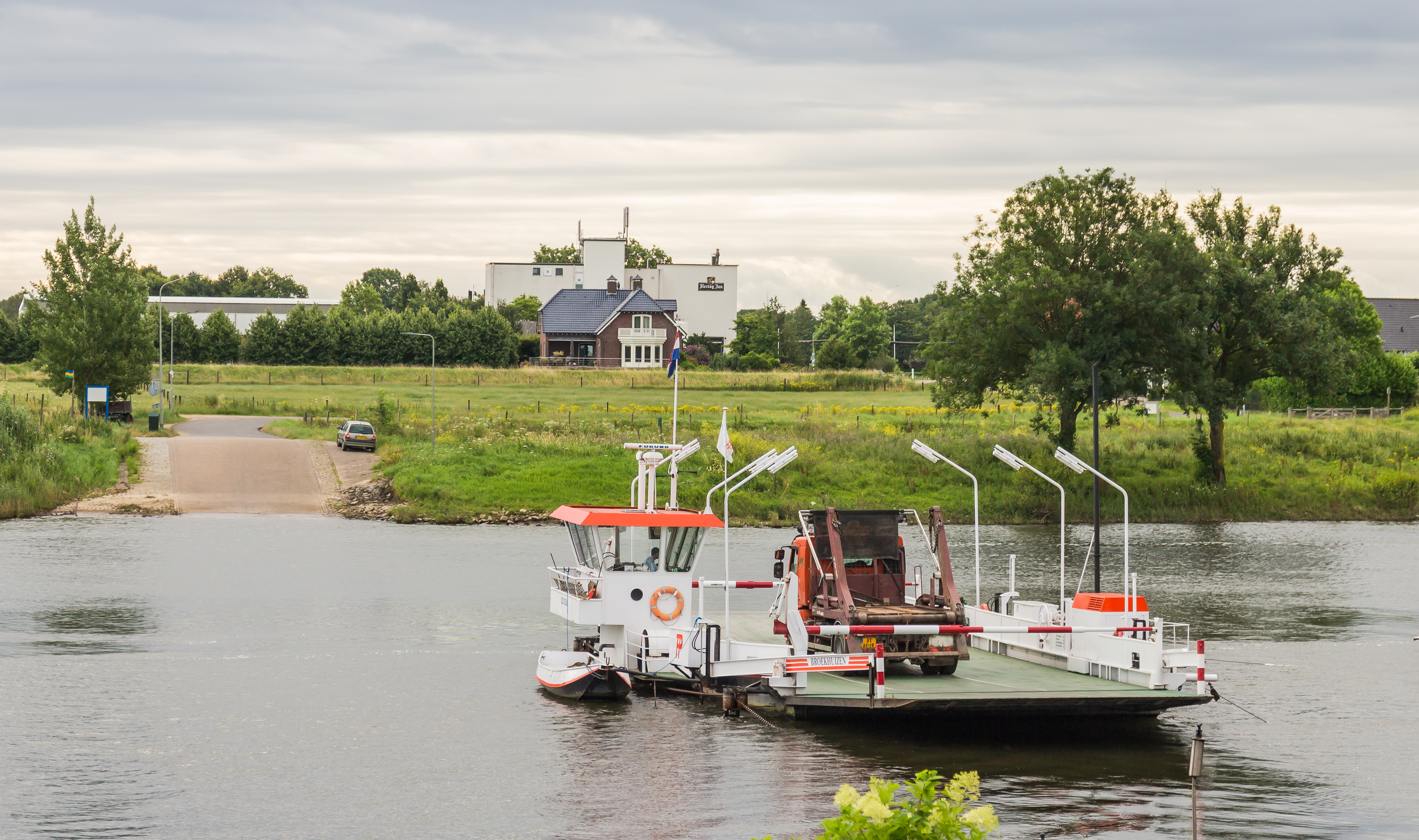
Ferry over the Maas

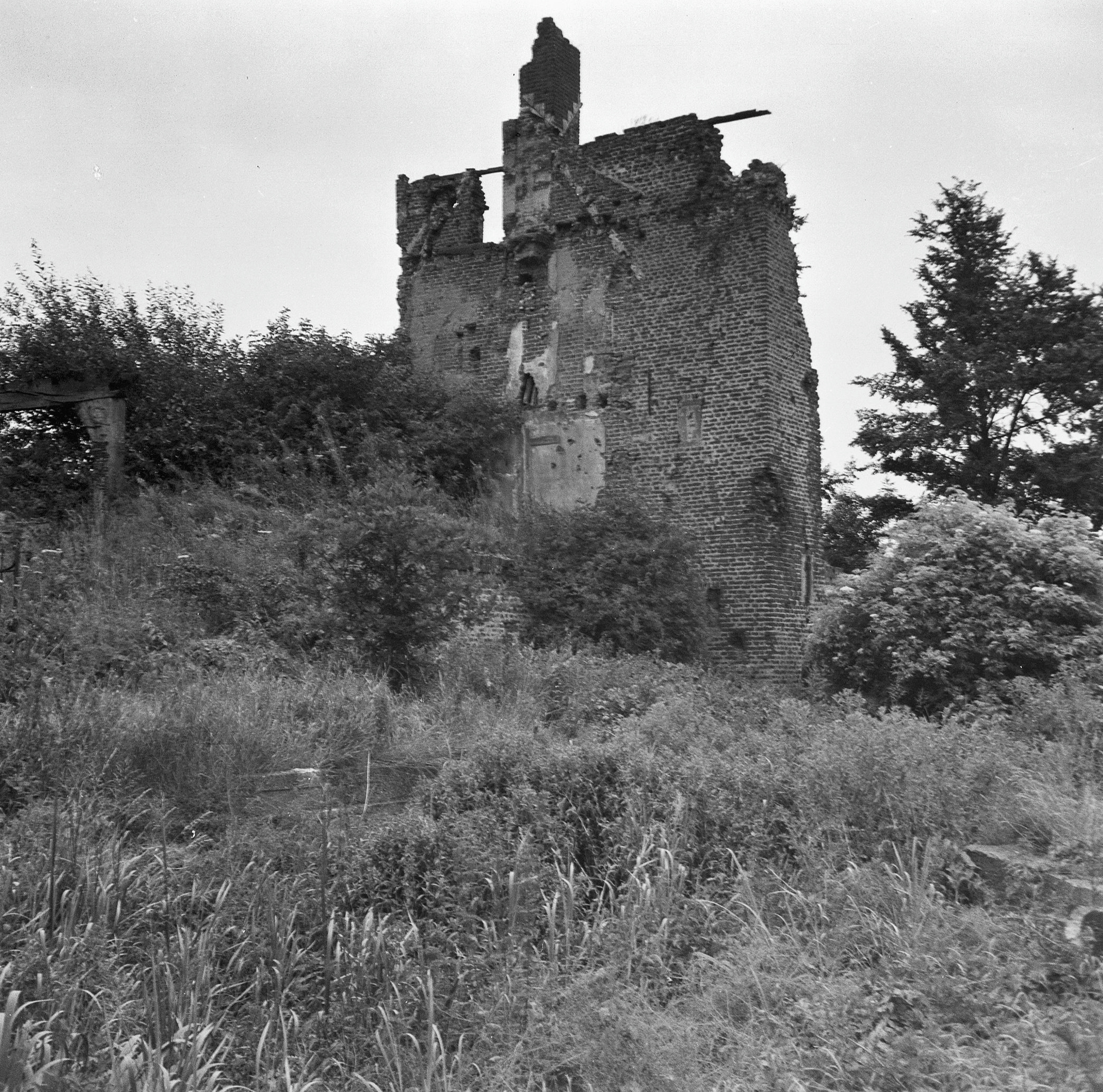
Ruins of Broekhuizen Castle (1959)

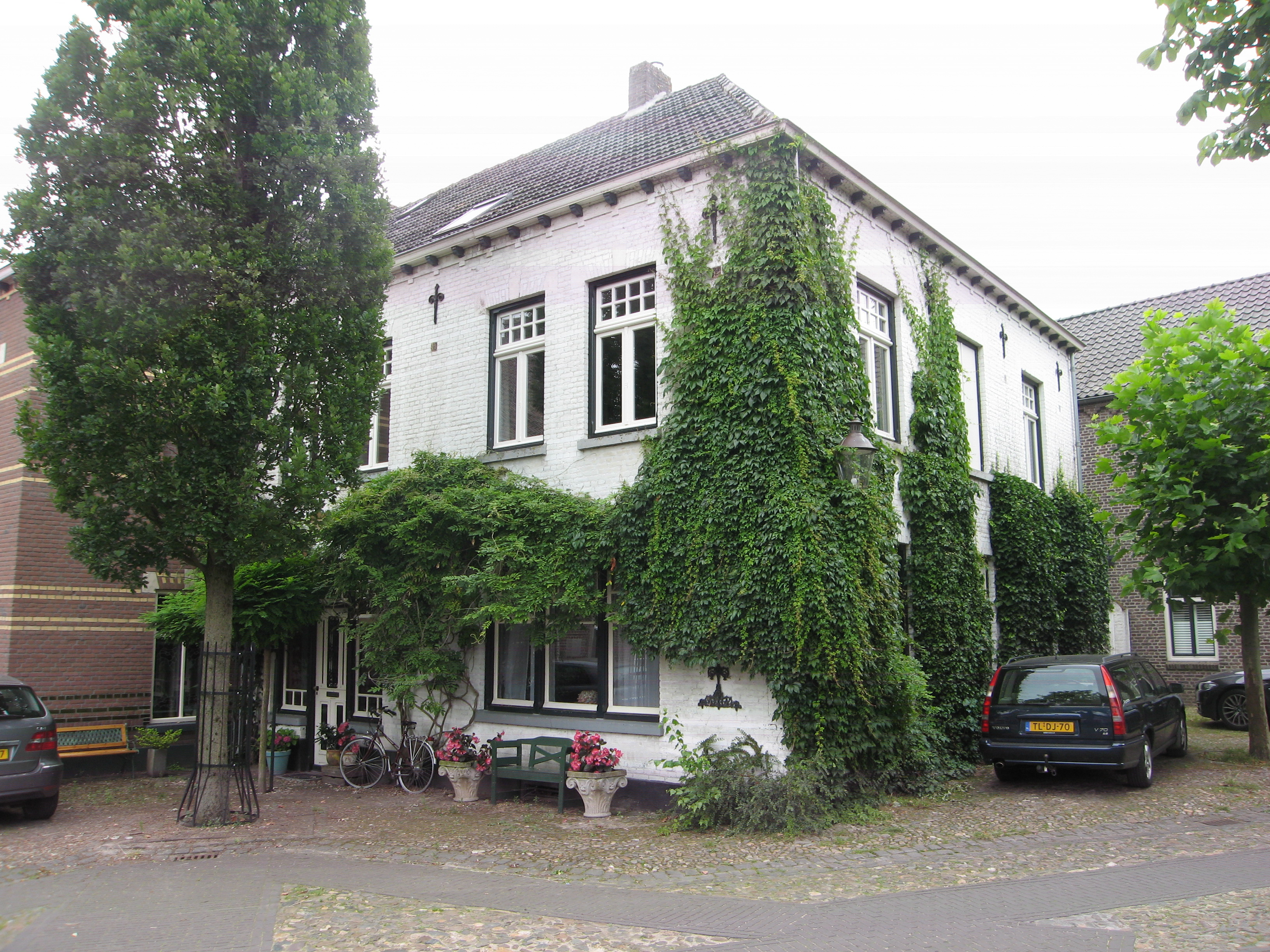
House in Broekhuizen

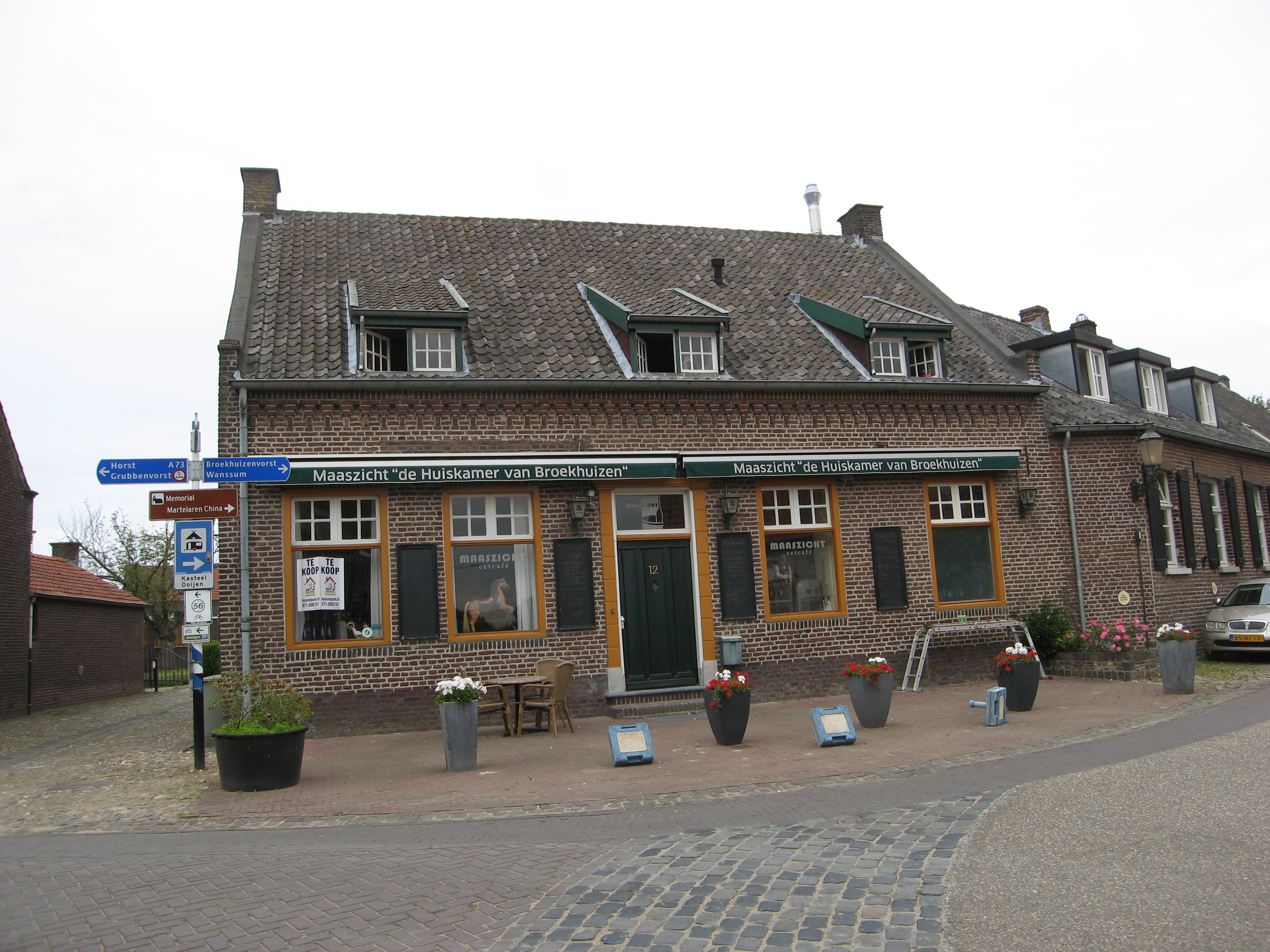
Shop in Broekhuizen
