= Allt-yr-yn =

Suburb of Newport, Wales

Allt-yr-ynn: Allt-yr-yn
- Location within Newport
- Population: 9,192 (2020 census)
- OS grid reference: ST295885
- Principal area: Newport
- Country: Wales
- Sovereign state: United Kingdom
- Post town: NEWPORT
- Postcode district: NP20
- Dialling code: 01633; Savoy exchange
- Police: Gwent
- Fire: South Wales
- Ambulance: Welsh
- UK Parliament: Newport West and Islwyn
- Senedd Cymru – Welsh Parliament: Newport West
- List of places UK Wales Newport 51.59°N 3.02°W Map of the community

Allt-yr-yn (Welsh: Allt-yr-ynn) is a suburb of the city Newport, south-east Wales.

== Description ==
The official standardised spelling of the area's name in both Welsh and English is Allt-yr-ynn, but the last letter is commonly dropped in English spellings. The name is derived from Welsh toponymical elements allt (meaning a wooded slope or hillside) and ynn (meaning ash trees).

Allt-yr-yn forms an electoral ward (district) and coterminous community (parish) of the city. It is mainly residential and contains many large houses built in the early 20th century. Some of the district is built upon the Ridgeway, Newport, with part of the ward offering views of surrounding areas such as Twmbarlwm. The area is governed by Newport City Council.

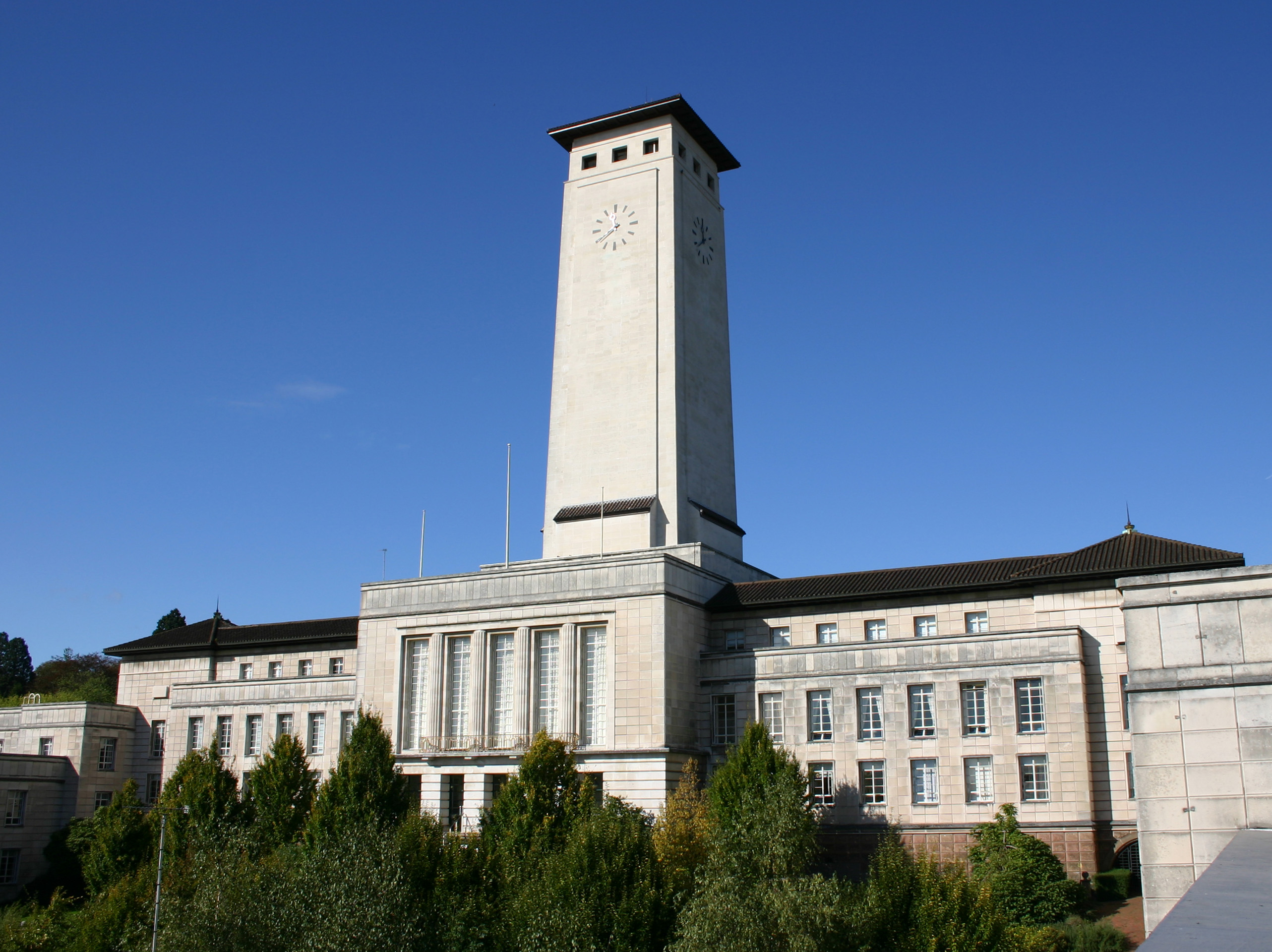
Newport Civic Centre

Towards the city centre, Allt-yr-yn is home to the offices of Newport City Council, at the Civic Centre, the clock tower of which can be seen for miles around.

University of Wales, Newport had a campus in Allt-yr-yn, serving as the university's Science, IT and Business faculty, before moving to a site with a new £35 million complex on the banks of the River Usk in central Newport. The new campus formally opened in January 2011. Initially, the new campus housed the Newport Business School and design, film and media elements of the Newport School of Art, Media and Design.

On the west side of Allt-yr-yn heights is a Local Nature Reserve containing ancient woodland, meadows and five ponds. Between 1934 and the mid-1960s this was home to open-air swimming baths. The nature reserve, managed by the volunteer group WING – Wildlife In Newport Group, borders the Crumlin Arm of the Monmouthshire and Brecon Canal which runs parallel to the M4 Motorway at Allt-yr-yn. Lock 2 has been restored by volunteers and work has started on lock 3. Lock 1 disappeared under road works in Newport early in the 20th century.

A permanent military presence was established in the area with the completion of the Cavalry Barracks in 1845.

There was once a hospital in the ward, but this was deemed surplus to requirements and the site is now the Allt-yr-yn Heights estate.

== Notable residents ==
In 2002 Nicky Wire, bassist and secondary vocalist of the Welsh alternative rock band Manic Street Preachers, moved with his family to a £500,000 luxury house in Allt-yr-yn.
