= Raglan Barracks, Newport =

Military building in Newport, Wales

Raglan Barracks
- Newport
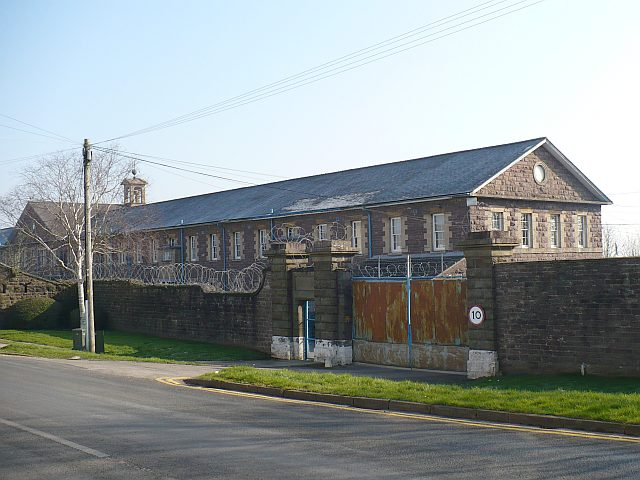
- Raglan Barracks

Site information
- Type: Barracks
- Owner: Ministry of Defence
- Operator: British Army

Location
- Location within Newport
- Coordinates: 51.59506°N 3.00891°W

Site history
- Built: 1843–1845
- Built for: War Office
- In use: 1845-Present

Garrison information
- Occupants: 104th Regiment Royal Artillery; Band of the Royal Welsh; 3rd Battalion, Royal Welsh Corps of Drums

Raglan Barracks is a military installation at Barrack Hill in Allt-yr-yn in Newport, Wales.

== History ==
The barracks were built as a cavalry barracks and completed in 1845. During the First World War they were known as the Cavalry Barracks and served as the 4th cavalry depot providing accommodation for the 2nd Dragoon Guards (Queen's Bays), the 3rd Dragoon Guards, the 4th Royal Irish Dragoon Guards, the Carabiniers (6th Dragoon Guards), the 7th Dragoon Guards and the 6th (Inniskilling) Dragoons. The barracks were renamed Raglan Barracks after FitzRoy Somerset, 1st Baron Raglan in 1963.

== Units ==
The barracks are now home to:

- Headquarters, 104th Regiment Royal Artillery,
- Corps of Drums of 3rd Battalion, Royal Welsh.
- Detachment, 4th Battalion the Parachute Regiment
- E Squadron 21 SAS,
- 74 MI Company, 7 Military Intelligence Battalion
- Band of the Royal Welsh
