= 104th Regiment Royal Artillery =

British Army reserve artillery regiment

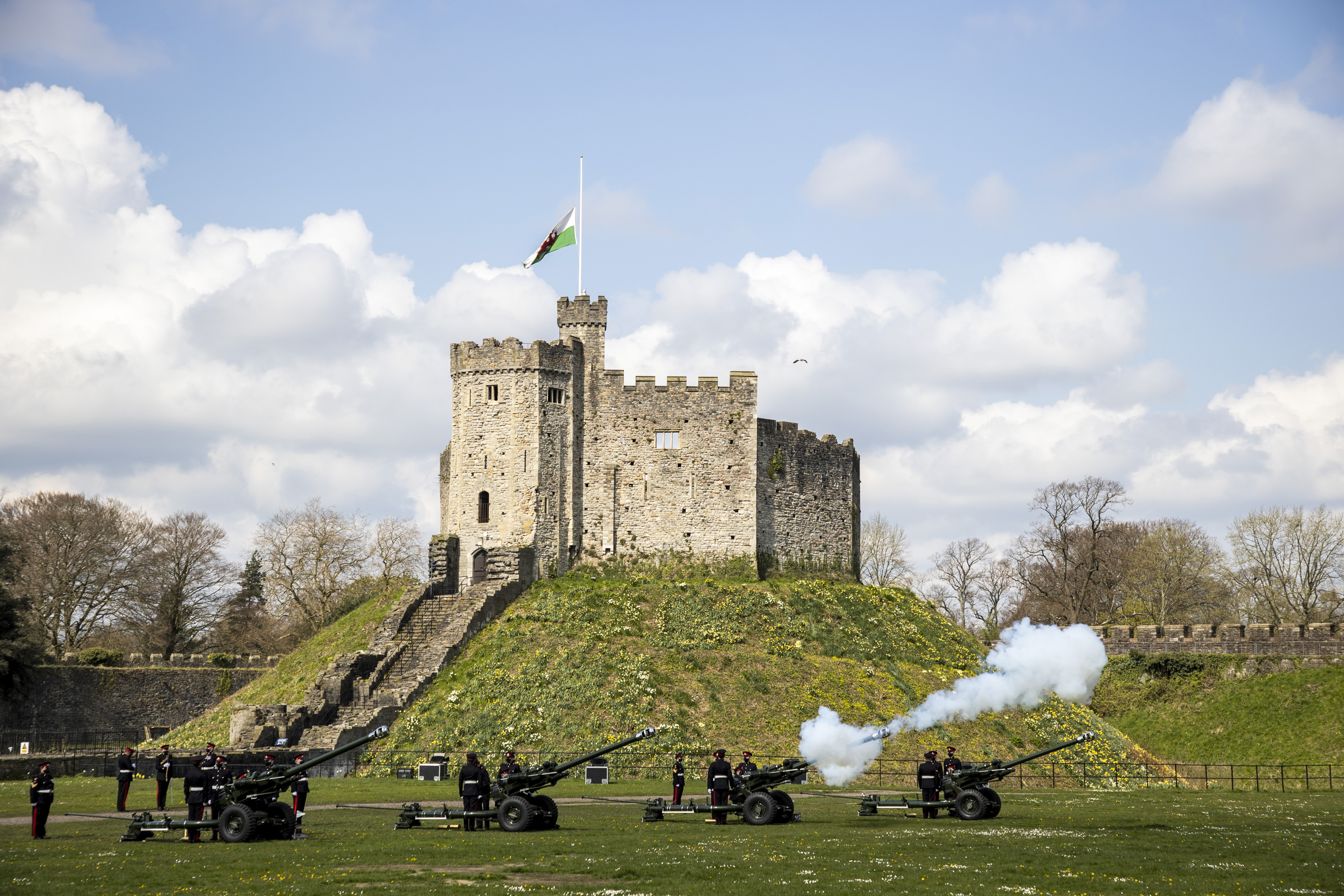
- 104 Regiment Royal Artillery firing a Death Gun Salute at Cardiff Castle to mark the death of Prince Philip in April 2021.
- Active: 1967–Present
- Allegiance: United Kingdom
- Branch: British Army
- Size: 4 Batteries; 431 personnel
- Part of: 3rd Deep Reconnaissance Strike Brigade
- Garrison/HQ: Raglan Barracks, South Wales
- Nicknames: "The Welsh & Borderer Gunners"
- Equipment: L118 light gun

104 Regiment Royal Artillery (The Welsh & Borderer Gunners) is part of the British Army Reserve and has sub-units throughout Wales and the West Midlands of England. It is equipped with the 105mm Light Gun.

== History ==
The regiment was formed as 104 Light Air Defence Regiment Royal Artillery (Volunteers) in 1967. Its units were 210 (Staffordshire) Light Air Defence Battery at Wolverhampton and 211 (South Wales) Light Air Defence Battery at Newport. In 1969, 214 (Worcestershire) Light Air Defence Battery at Malvern was formed and joined the regiment. It was renamed 104 Air Defence Regiment Royal Artillery (Volunteers) in 1976. In 1986, 217 (County of Gwent) Air Defence Battery was formed at Cwmbran and joined the regiment. In 1992, 217 Battery was merged into Headquarters Battery and in 1993 the regiment was renamed 104 Regiment Royal Artillery (Volunteers). Meanwhile, 210 Battery was transferred to 106th (Yeomanry) Regiment Royal Artillery. In 1997, it began an unofficial affiliation with the Royal Bermuda Regiment (an amalgam of the Bermuda Militia Artillery and the Bermuda Volunteer Rifle Corps).

Under Army 2020, 266 (Gloucestershire Volunteer Artillery) Battery Royal Artillery joined the regiment from 100th (Yeomanry) Regiment Royal Artillery. In 2017, it converted to a light artillery gun regiment.

== Batteries ==
The current structure is as follows:

- Regimental Headquarters, at Raglan Barracks, Newport
- 211 (South Wales) Battery Royal Artillery, in Abertillery
  - C (Glamorgan Yeomanry) Troop, in Cardiff, Wales
- 214 (Worcestershire) Battery Royal Artillery, in Worcester
- 217 (City of Newport) Battery Royal Artillery, at Raglan Barracks, Newport
- 266 (Gloucestershire Volunteer Artillery) Battery Royal Artillery, in Bristol
  - 289 Commando Troop, at Royal Citadel, Plymouth (Paired with 29th Commando Regiment Royal Artillery)

== Bibliography ==
- Litchfield, Norman E H, 1992. The Territorial Artillery 1908-1988, The Sherwood Press, Nottingham. ISBN 978-0-9508205-2-1
