= Clarissa Eden =

English memoirist (1920–2021)

The Right Honourable The Countess of Avon
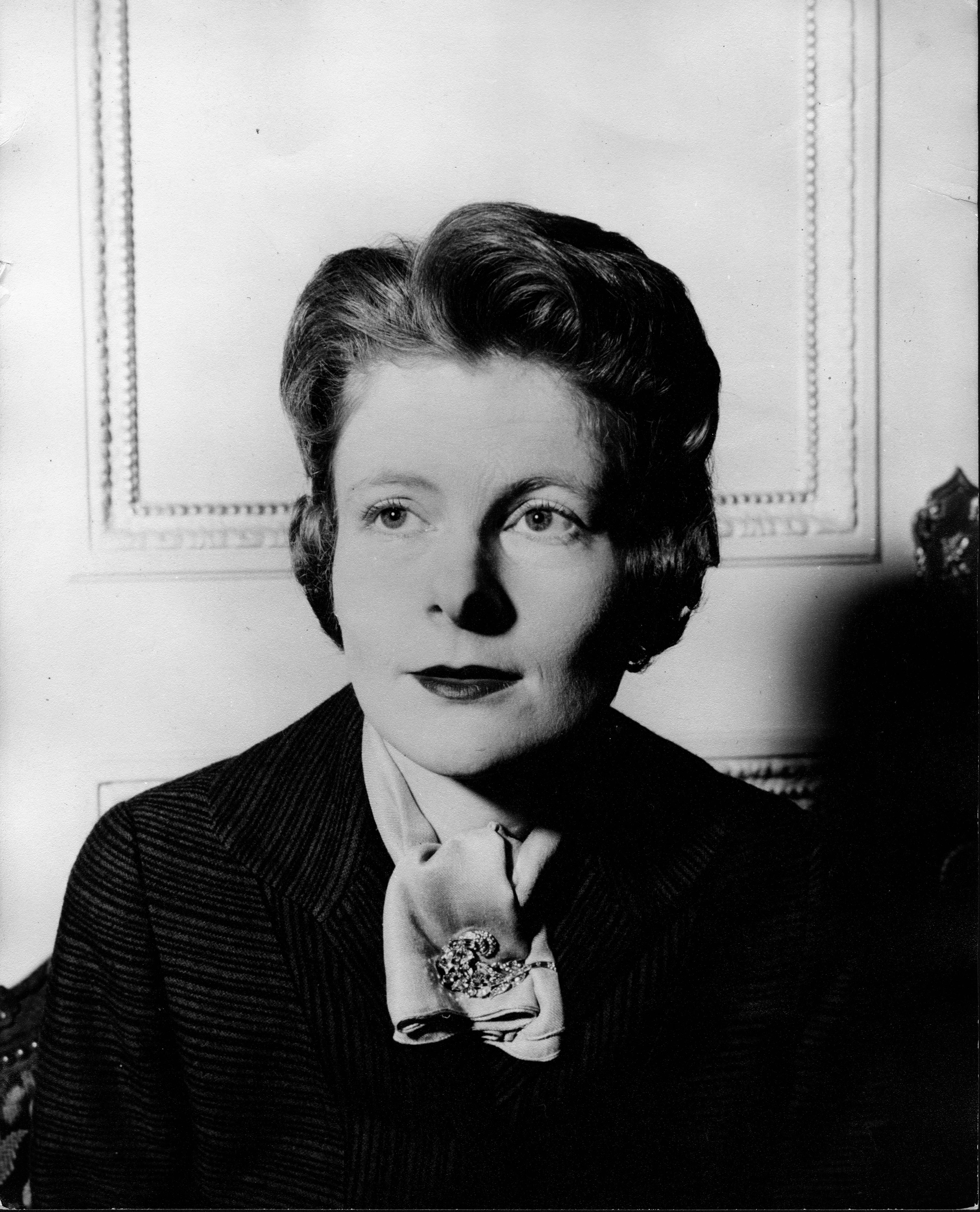
- Clarissa, Lady Eden, in 1960
- Born: Anne Clarissa Spencer-Churchill; 28 June 1920; Kensington, London, England
- Died: 15 November 2021 (aged 101); Marylebone, London, England
- Known for: Spouse of the prime minister of the United Kingdom (1955–1957)
- Spouse: Anthony Eden (m. 1952; died 1977)
- Father: Harold Baker (biological); Jack Churchill (legal)
- Family: Spencer-Churchill; Eden

Anne Clarissa Eden, Countess of Avon (née Spencer-Churchill; 28 June 1920 – 15 November 2021) was an English memoirist and the second wife of Anthony Eden, who served as British prime minister from 1955 to 1957. She married Eden in 1952, becoming Lady Eden in 1954 when he was made Knight Companion of the Garter, before becoming Countess of Avon in 1961 when her husband was created Earl of Avon. In 2007, at 87, she released her memoir subtitled From Churchill to Eden.

On the death of Lady Wilson of Rievaulx in 2018, Lady Avon became the oldest living spouse of a British prime minister. She turned 100 in 2020, the second British prime minister's spouse to become a centenarian after Wilson.

== Early life ==
Clarissa Spencer-Churchill was born on 28 June 1920, legally the daughter of Major Jack Spencer-Churchill (1880–1947) and Lady Gwendoline ("Goonie") Bertie (1885–1941), a daughter of the 7th Earl of Abingdon, who had married in 1908. Her elder brothers were John ("Johnnie") (1909–1992), an artist, and Henry Winston (1913–2002), known as Peregrine. However, it was later discovered that her biological father was the Liberal politician Harold Baker, who had had an affair with Lady Gwendoline in 1919.

Spencer-Churchill was born at her parents' house in the Cromwell Road, Kensington, London. She was educated at Kensington Preparatory School and then at Downham School, Hatfield Heath, "a fashionable boarding school ... orientated to horses", which she disliked and left early without any formal qualifications. Seventy years later she said she had also felt the need to get away from home—"I just wanted to get out from under the whole thing of being loved too much".

=== Paris, Tuscany and London (1937–1939) ===
In 1937 Spencer-Churchill studied art in Paris. Her mother had asked the British ambassador, Sir George Clerk, to keep a watchful eye on her, an unintended consequence of this being that she was taken under the wing of an embassy press secretary who, with his wife, introduced her to a round of café society parties. Among the friends she made in Paris were writers Fitzroy Maclean and Marthe Bibesco. Together with two female contemporaries, she visited the Folies Bergère, an unusual destination for 16-year-old girls, where the singer Josephine Baker, clad only in a circlet of bananas, became the first naked female body she had ever seen.

In the summer of 1937, Spencer-Churchill accompanied Julian Asquith (grandson of the Liberal prime minister H. H. Asquith) and his mother, Katharine, on tour, mainly by third class rail, across the Apennines in the Tuscany region of Italy. Among other artistic treasures, she saw the fifteenth-century frescoes by Piero della Francesca at Arezzo, one of which, The Queen of Sheba Adoring the Holy Wood (c. 1452), she nominated in 2010 as her favourite painting—"in an age of violence he went on painting clearly and calmly".

When Spencer-Churchill returned to London, she enrolled at the Slade School of Fine Art. Around this time, she displayed her individualism by acquiring a specially tailored trouser suit along the lines of those associated with the actress Marlene Dietrich after the latter's appearance in the film Morocco (1930). 1938 was the future Lady Avon's "coming out" year, and she was regarded as "[o]ne of the more notable" débutantes in "a vintage year for beautiful girls", but, having mixed with older and more sophisticated people in Paris, she seemed to have disdained the circuit—since described by Anne de Courcy as "more or less naive seventeen- and eighteen-year-olds suddenly flung into a round of gaities"—and was never presented at court. Another débutante of 1938, Deborah Mitford, later Duchess of Devonshire, recalled Spencer-Churchill as exhibiting "more than a whiff of [Greta] Garbo in a dress by Maggy Rouff of Paris". (Note: Another who did the season in 1938 was Sarah (Sally) Norton, daughter of the 6th Lord Grantley. She had learnt fluent German in Munich, but "despite her eighteen-inch waist and perfect legs", she was still single when war broke out in 1939. On VE Day in 1945, Norton met the future 3rd Viscount Astor and was engaged to him within a week.)

Among those with whom Spencer-Churchill danced at that year's Liberal ball was the future double agent Donald Maclean, who complained that she was too smart to be "a proper Liberal girl like the Bonham-Carters and the Asquiths". (Note: Lady Avon later reflected that it turned out Maclean "wasn't a proper Liberal boy either".) She also knew Guy Burgess, who fled to Russia in 1951 when he and Maclean were about to be unmasked as traitors. A 2015 biography of Burgess, a homosexual, contained claims that, encouraged by his Soviet "handlers", he had contemplated marriage to Spencer-Churchill. However, the latter, then aged 95, denied that they had been close. She described Burgess as "courteous, amusing, nice and good company" but said that he had been "standoffish" towards her and did not wish any friendship to develop.

In 1939 Spencer-Churchill spent another four months in Paris and, in August of that year, travelled to Romania as a guest of the novelist Elizabeth Bibesco and her husband Antoine (Elizabeth's mother, Margot Asquith, having been left distraught after her daughter visited her in London earlier in the year (Note: Due to the war, mother and daughter never met again and died within four months of each other in 1945. Elizabeth's daughter, Priscilla (1920–2004), to whom Asquith dedicated her second volume of memoirs in 1933—"one of the loves of my life"—escaped Romania by hitchhiking to Lebanon. She, too, never saw her mother nor her grandmother again.)). Spencer-Churchill only just managed to return to England—on one of the last flights out of Bucharest—before the start of the Second World War.

=== Second World War: Oxford and the Foreign Office ===
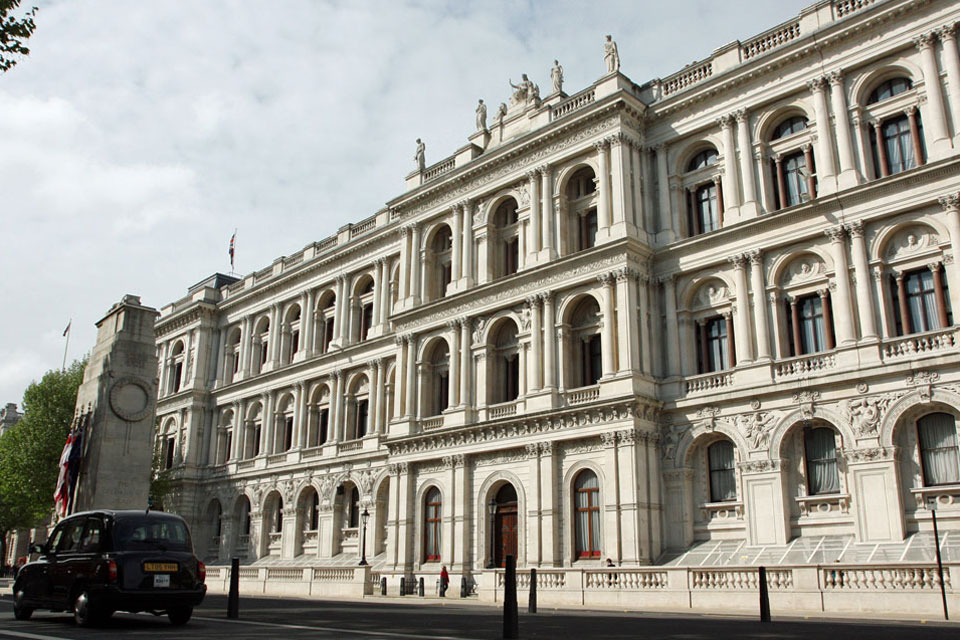
The Foreign Office in London, c. 2014

In 1940, encouraged by economist Roy Harrod, Spencer-Churchill went to Oxford to study philosophy, although not as an undergraduate because of her lack of qualifications. While there, she became associated with, among other leading academics, Isaiah Berlin and Maurice Bowra. Lady Antonia Fraser, whose father, later Lord Longford, was a fellow of Christ Church, described her as having been "the dons' delight". For a short while she was tutored by A. J. Ayer, a future Wykeham Professor of Logic known for his libidinous lifestyle, although his womanising was not extended to her. (Note: Just after the war an Oxford don remarked to Paul Johnson, then an undergraduate: "That's Ayer. Might have been a great philosopher. Ruined by sex.")

When Spencer-Churchill moved back to London, she decoded ciphers in the communications department of the Foreign Office, where her future husband was the secretary of state from 1940 to 1945. One of her colleagues was Anthony Nutting, who in 1956 resigned from Anthony Eden's government because of his opposition to the Suez Operation. For a time, the future Lady Avon lived in a rooftop room at the Dorchester Hotel, which she obtained at a cut-price rate because of its vulnerability to bombing (although the building was a modern, steel-framed structure with extensive underground accommodation that was considered relatively safe during air raids). (Note: Lady Diana Cooper, who, with her husband Duff Cooper, also had an upper room at the Dorchester, wrote to her son in Canada that "the All Clear wouldn't go and the wakefulness was supported by the watcher on the Dorchester roof walking up and down so very near my head. It kept me aware of how little covering there was above us".)

=== Post-war ===
After the war Spencer-Churchill worked at London Films for the producer Sir Alexander Korda, who she thought made "terrible mistakes without really knowing what has happened", and as a reviewer for the fashion magazine Vogue. She met the actor Orson Welles, who became a dining companion, on the set of the film The Third Man (1949), and escorted actress Paulette Goddard, who played Mrs. Cheverley in Korda's production of Oscar Wilde's An Ideal Husband (1947), on "a rather wild trip" to Brussels. During the latter excursion, Goddard expressed a wish to attend a pornographic show. Although Korda's representatives made arrangements for this, she shied away when she and Spencer-Churchill, having climbed "a flight of shabby stairs", were greeted by two men in black suits.

Spencer-Churchill also worked for the short-lived monthly magazine Contact, established by George (later Lord) Weidenfeld and edited by Philip Toynbee. Weidenfeld was keen to expand into book publishing, and Contact, which appeared with a hard cover, offered a means of circumventing post-war paper quotas. Among those Spencer-Churchill persuaded to contribute to the magazine was the cookery writer Elizabeth David, whose recipes became very influential in the 1950s. Through Weidenfeld she also became a close friend of Marcus Sieff, later chairman of the retailer Marks and Spencer.

As a result of this eclectic early career, she widened her circle of friends and contacts beyond those in society and politics with whom she already had close connections. As one of Anthony Eden's biographers put it, she was "equally at home in the worlds of Hatfield and Fitzrovia", while a reviewer of her memoir wrote that "few lives can have touched so many social worlds, or graced them so elegantly". Even so, the future Lady Avon did not impress everyone: after the future prime minister Margaret Thatcher met her at a Conservative Party ball in 1954, she wrote dismissively to her sister, "Mrs Anthony Eden received us. Really she is a most colourless personality". (Note: In fact, it might have been said of both women that, as Moore (2013, p. 128) wrote of Thatcher's period at the bar in the 1950s: "Without the slightest hint of impropriety, she ... sought and enjoyed the company of clever, older men." Thatcher was Leader of the Conservative Party when Anthony Eden died in 1977, and Lady Avon had corresponded with her about her husband's declining health.)

== 2007 memoir ==
A Memoir: From Churchill to Eden
- First edition
- Editor: Cate Haste
- Language: English
- Publisher: Weidenfeld & Nicolson
- Publication date: 25 October 2007
- Publication place: United Kingdom
- Media type: Print (hardback)
- Pages: 288
- ISBN: 978-0-297-85193-6

Glimpses of Spencer-Churchill's life as a single woman, for example, in diaries and other reminiscences, are quite extensive. Although she had indicated to the former Labour member of Parliament (MP) Woodrow Wyatt that no memoir of her own would appear until after her death, a volume, edited by Cate Haste, was nevertheless published by Weidenfeld & Nicolson in 2007, and Phoenix brought out a paperback edition in 2008. In 2004 Haste had collaborated with Cherie Booth, wife of the then prime minister Tony Blair, to produce a biographical chapter about Lady Avon as part of a broader study of prime ministerial spouses. Avon noted that after meeting Haste, she realised that the latter's "enthusiasm and professionalism could make it possible".

A photograph on the dust jacket of her memoir, depicting a young, pensive Spencer-Churchill, cigarette in hand, conveyed an alluring and slightly Bohemian image. The book was generally well-received by critics and even generated an engaging "spoof" in the satirical magazine Private Eye ("In the early 1950s I married Anthony Eden, a politician of above average height, with a prominent moustache ..."). Historian Andrew Roberts described it as "the last great British autobiography of the pre-war and wartime era", while art critic John McEwen remarked on its "witty and elegant restraint".

== Friends and acquaintances ==
=== Early admirers ===
Having lost both parents by her mid-twenties, Spencer-Churchill was comparatively independent for a young woman. In later years, she remarked to Woodrow Wyatt on "how much more restricted" girls were when she was young while conceding that she had had her first affair at 17 with a "man who was quite well-known and ... still alive [in 1986]". She had many devoted admirers, an early "ardent suitor" being Sir Colville Barclay, briefly a diplomat and later a painter, who was the stepson of Lord Vansittart, former permanent head of the Foreign Office.

Wyatt quoted Lady Avon as having told him that she had resisted the amorous advances of Duff Cooper, wartime information minister and the British ambassador in Paris (1944–1947), who, thirty years her senior, had also been a friend of her mother: (Note: Cooper and his wife Lady Diana had, like Spencer-Churchill, taken a room at the Dorchester Hotel in the early years of the Second World War.) "I was the only woman who he never got more than a peck on the cheek from". (Note: This appears to derive from Cooper's observation to Lady Avon that she was the only woman he had loved from whom he had sought no more. According to historian Hugo Vickers, Pinna Cruger (1896–1950), wife of a millionaire haberdasher, Bertram Cruger, and possibly mistress, for a time, of the Prince of Wales, later Edward VIII, "backed off Duff Cooper when she detected that he was happily married". Bertram Cruger was an admirer of Cooper's wife Diana, the two having met in New York City.) She informed Cooper in 1947, following a weekend in the country with Anthony Eden, at which the only other guest was the French ambassador to Britain, that Eden "never stops trying to make love to her". (Note: Charmley (1986) quotes this reference to Eden, but protects Lady Avon's identity, noting that "the name is given in Duff's diary". In 1983, when Conservative Party chairman Cecil Parkinson informed Prime Minister Margaret Thatcher that he had been having an affair with his secretary, her initial reaction is said to have been, "What's the problem? They tell me Anthony Eden jumped into bed with every good-looking woman he ever met".) When Cooper was raised to the peerage (eventually choosing the title Viscount Norwich), he sought Spencer-Churchill's views as to a title—"Think, child, think ... Have you any suggestions? (not funny ones)"—and she was the recipient of the last letter that he wrote (from White's club) shortly before his death at sea on New Year's Day, 1954.

=== Other friends ===
Among the future Lady Avon's many other friends, several of whom were some years older than she, were the novelists Evelyn Waugh, Anthony Powell, and Nancy Mitford (whose sister Deborah wrote of an encounter with Avon some 20 years after they had been débutantes together that she found her "rather alarming"), painter Lucian Freud, and choreographer Frederick Ashton. When she was still in her teens James Pope-Hennessy modelled on her the character of Perdita in London Fabric (1939) and dedicated the book "To Clarissa". Gerald, Lord Berners, used her as the basis of a character in his novel Far From the Madding War (1941), while photographer Cecil Beaton, 16 years her senior, treated her as a special confidante and introduced her to the reclusive Swedish actress Greta Garbo. The journalist and author Sofka Zinovieff claimed that, after her grandmother, Jennifer Fry (of the Fry's chocolate family), separated in 1944 from her grandfather, Robert Heber-Percy, who was Lord Berners's closest friend, Spencer-Churchill and Beaton amused themselves by riffling through underclothes and love letters that Fry had left in a drawer at Berners's country home, Faringdon House, in Oxfordshire. (Note: Avon herself recalled that, when she first spotted Heber-Percy wandering around the grounds of Faringdon and asked who he was, Berners described him as "my agent", although they were lovers.) A few years later while working at Contact, Spencer-Churchill became friends with the writer and journalist Alan Ross, who subsequently married Fry.

Lady Avon thought the writer and horticulturalist Vita Sackville-West (whose husband, the politician and diplomat Harold Nicolson was a friend of her mother) "an interesting romantic figure". Still, she felt "dunched" by her "remote and rather superior" manner. Visiting her at Sissinghurst some years later, she "thought the less of her" for troubling to provide, evidently in a hurry, table napkins that were still damp. Like Avon herself, many of her acquaintances frequented the bookshop Heywood Hill, next to the hairdresser Trumper's in Mayfair's Curzon Street, which, during the war was managed by Nancy Mitford and became a regular meeting place: according to Mitford's sister, Diana, Lady Mosley, "[i]ts ground-floor room didn't just look like a private club, it very nearly was one". (Note: Heywood Hill, which bore the name of its owner, opened in 1936. Mitford initially worked as an assistant there but took over the running of it when Hill was called up for war service.)

Avon was a long-standing friend of Ann Fleming, wife of novelist Ian Fleming and lover of Hugh Gaitskell, Leader of the Labour Party from 1955 to 1963, who had previously been married to Viscount Rothermere. In 1952, she and composer and playwright Noël Coward became godparents to the Flemings' son Caspar, who died of a drug overdose in 1975. In later years, as a widow, she was close to the influential solicitor Lord Goodman. (Note: Goodman was a major figure in the British artistic establishment. Kenneth Tynan described him in 1972 as "[t]he antibody in our time ... [N]ever [holding] elective office, he has wielded more power than anyone in the country, except the Prime Minister during the past decade".) Another long-standing social acquaintance was Labour minister Roy (later Lord) Jenkins, also a friend of Ann Fleming. Jenkins's official biographer chose, as an example of the broadly-based groups Jenkins would entertain at his home at East Hendred, a small party assembled there in March 1994—Avon, together with the architectural historian James Lees-Milne, Jenkins's publisher Roland Philipps and their wives.

== Relationship with Anthony Eden ==
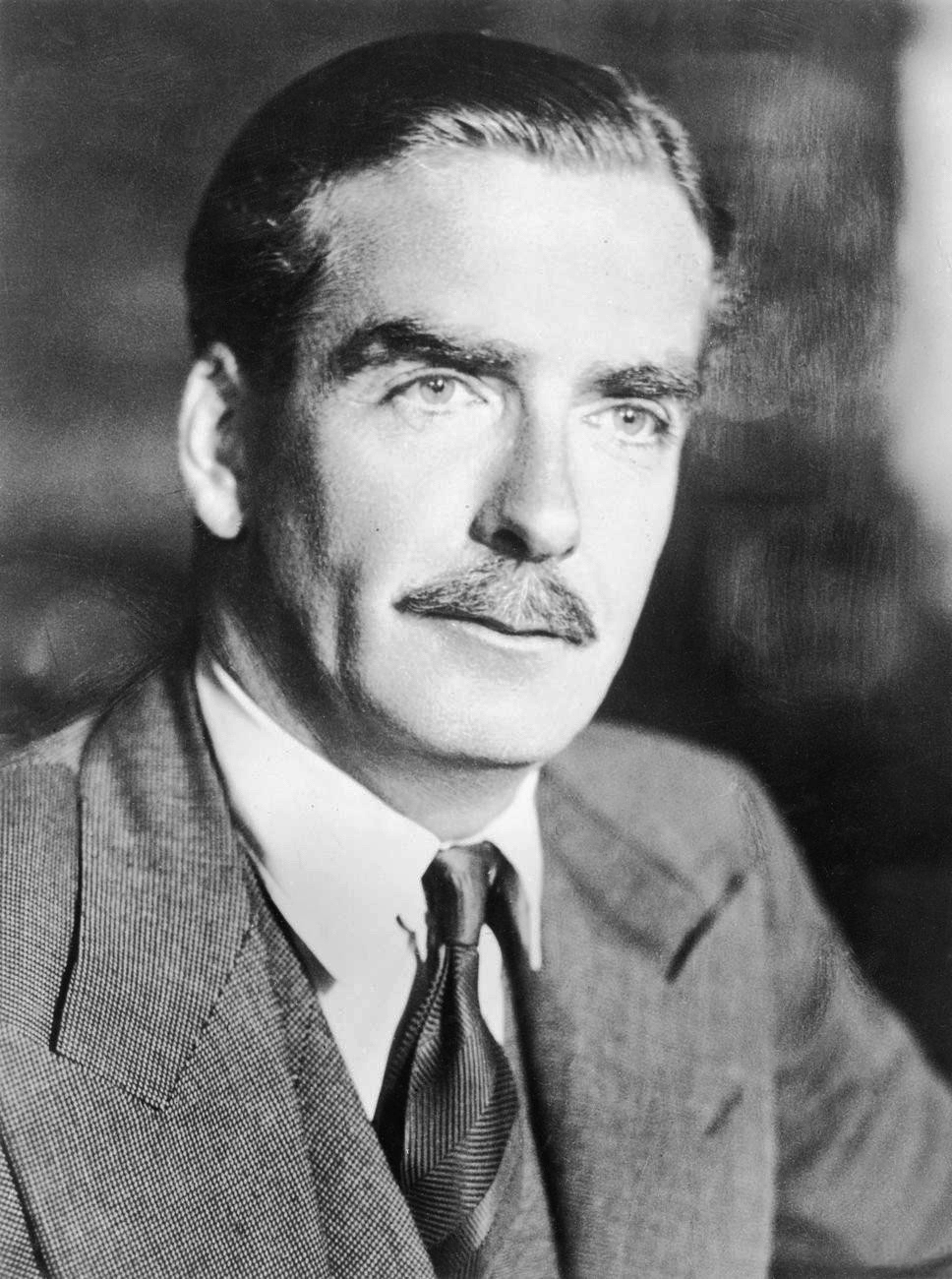
Anthony Eden, c. 1941–42

Spencer-Churchill first met her future husband at Cranborne, Dorset (home of the future 5th Marquess of Salisbury), in 1936, when she was 16. He was already famous for his elegant attire and Homburg hat, and she was struck by Eden's unusual pinstriped tweed trousers.

=== Winston Churchill and the wartime link ===
There was further contact during the war, under the circles in which she and Eden moved and through her uncle Winston, who became prime minister in May 1940. As an illustration of her occasional proximity to the centre of power, between meetings of the War Cabinet on 30 May 1940, when the Dunkirk evacuation was at its height, Spencer-Churchill was present when Churchill lunched with her parents and the Duke and Duchess of Marlborough. The future Lady Avon described this occasion as "a nightmare, with news of people's deaths coming in ...". (Note: According to Gilbert (1983, p. 437), Churchill was in France on 31 May.) After her mother died in 1941, she stayed at Chequers, the prime minister's country home in Buckinghamshire.

R. A. Butler, then Minister of Education, recalled a dinner party in Eden's flat above the Foreign Office following the German invasion of the Soviet Union in 1941. Attempting to defuse an argument between Churchill and Lord Beaverbrook about their respective motivation during the abdication crisis of 1936, Spencer-Churchill, just turned 21, proclaimed with patent improbability that she had three favourites, Edward VIII, Leopold III of Belgium and the aviator Charles Lindbergh.

=== Marriage to Eden ===
A more defined relationship with Eden, who was a married man 23 years older than Spencer-Churchill, developed gradually after they had sat next to each other at a dinner party in about 1947. Eden had been monopolised for much of the meal by a woman on his other side and afterwards, in an undertone, invited Spencer-Churchill out to dinner. In 1950, Eden was divorced from his first wife, Beatrice (née Beckett, 1905–1957). Although she was a Roman Catholic and her church was opposed to divorce, Spencer-Churchill married Eden, who had become Foreign Secretary again in 1951, in a civil ceremony at Caxton Hall, London, on 14 August 1952. This event drew large crowds, on a level with those earlier in the year for the wedding of film stars Elizabeth Taylor and Michael Wilding, prompting Harold Macmillan, Minister of Housing, to note that "it's extraordinary how much 'glamour' [Eden] still has and how popular he is". The wedding reception was held at 10 Downing Street, the official residence of the prime minister, who at the time was Lady Eden's uncle, Churchill.

==== Attitudes to the marriage ====
Until 2019, Eden was one of only two British prime ministers to have been divorced (although he was one of ten to have been married twice). An editorial in the Church Times recalled that in 1936 Edward VIII had faced a choice between keeping his throne and marrying a divorcee. It added that "Mr. Eden's action this week shows how far the climate of public opinion in this matter has changed for the worse". The same criticism came from others in the Anglican church, including the Archbishop of Sydney, Howard Mowll, who drew the same parallel. Harold Macmillan, among others, thought such comparisons unfair: "Miss Churchill cannot be compared with Mrs Simpson, who had had two husbands". However, the marriage also drew the opprobrium of Evelyn Waugh, a convert to Roman Catholicism after divorce from his first wife, who professed to have been in love with Spencer-Churchill himself and who, a few years earlier, had repeatedly criticised the poet John Betjeman for his Anglo-Catholic beliefs. (Note: Lady Avon's brother John had once been engaged to Betjeman's wife, then Penelope Chetwode, daughter of Field Marshal Sir Philip Chetwode. According to Wilson (2006, p. 94), Penelope's love for John Churchill had "waned".) Waugh enquired of Lady Eden, "Did you never think that you were contributing to the loneliness of Calvary by your desertion [of the faith]?"

On the eve of the wedding, John Colville, a long-time private secretary of Churchill, who in his younger days had been part of the same social "set" as Churchill's niece, recorded in his diary that Spencer-Churchill, who was staying at Churchill's home at Chartwell, Kent, was "very beautiful, but ... still strange and bewildering". He added that Churchill "feels avuncular to his orphaned niece, gave her a cheque for £500 and told me that he thought she had a most unusual personality". According to the future Lady Avon herself, Churchill's wife Clementine thought her "too independent and totally unsuitable", while the marriage is said to have exacerbated the antagonism towards Eden of the Churchills' often wayward son Randolph, who, having initially defended his cousin to Waugh, gave her "two years to knock [Eden] into shape". His subsequent attacks on Eden in the press culminated in a scathing biography, The Rise and Fall of Sir Anthony Eden (1959).

The issues relating to the Edens' marriage resurfaced in 1955 when Eden was prime minister. In that year, Princess Margaret, sister of the Queen, announced that she had decided not to marry Group Captain Peter Townsend, a divorcé. Although recently available evidence suggests that the Eden government was prepared to be reasonably accommodating towards such a marriage and that Margaret would have needed only to renounce her right of succession to the throne, (Note: Margaret was then third in the line of succession after Prince Charles and Princess Anne and so, in itself, renouncing her right of succession would have been primarily a technicality.) Townsend reflected in the 1970s that:

Eden could not fail to sympathise with the Princess, all the more so that while his own second marriage had incurred no penalty, either for him or his wife, he had to warn the Princess that my second marriage – to her – would [mean] she would have to renounce her royal rights, functions and income.

— Townsend (1978, p. 224)

==== Married life ====
The Edens' marriage, which lasted until his death on 14 January 1977, was, by all accounts, an extremely happy one.

The first five years of her marriage were dominated by Eden's political career and by the effects of a botched operation on his gall bladder in 1953, which caused lasting problems. Eden's private secretary, Evelyn Shuckburgh, recalled Lady Eden's role in ensuring that the complaint that led to the operation had been diagnosed properly: "When Eden acquired a loving wife, Sir [Horace] Evans was called in ...". Before then, Eden had travelled with a tin box containing medicaments that ranged from aspirins to morphia injections.

Historian Hugh Thomas noted that, though "non-political", Lady Avon was interested in foreign affairs, having written a Berlin diary for the literary magazine Horizon. Avon maintained many of her wider acquaintances. For example, Cecil Beaton and Greta Garbo visited 10 Downing Street at her invitation in October 1956. They drank vodka and ice, and Beaton recorded Lady Eden's observation that her husband was kept awake by the sound of motor scooters, which were growing in popularity among young people in the 1950s. Lady Eden is said to have murmured, "he can't keep away", as Eden, in Beaton's words, "gangled in like a colt" and proclaimed to Garbo that he had always wanted to meet her.

Lady Eden miscarried in 1954, and there were no children. Her stepson, Nicholas, Eden's surviving son from his first marriage, who succeeded him as 2nd Earl of Avon, served as Under-Secretary of State for Energy in Margaret Thatcher's government in the 1980s, but died of AIDS in 1985. At this point, the earldom became extinct.

== Eden's premiership ==
Churchill had told Lady Eden, following her honeymoon in 1952, that he wanted to give up the premiership. However, it was not until 6 April 1955 that Eden succeeded him as prime minister, shortly afterwards winning a general election in which the Conservative Party polled the largest percentage of the popular vote recorded by a party between 1945 and the present day. Colville noted that, at a dinner attended by the Queen to mark Churchill's retirement, the Duchess of Westminster had put her foot through Lady Eden's train, causing the monarch's consort, the Duke of Edinburgh, to remark, "that's torn it, in more than one sense".

Eden's premiership lasted less than two years. For much of this period, Eden was the subject of hostility from elements of the Conservative press, notably The Daily Telegraph, the wife of whose chairman, Lady Pamela Berry (an ambitious and sometimes spiteful society hostess, described by the biographer of her father, Lord Birkenhead, as "the politician manqué of the second generation" (Note: According to a more recent historian, Lady Pamela was "an able, ambitious woman who slaked her frustration at being denied formal responsibilities and power by outrushes of political malice".)), was said by some to have had a "blood row" (Macmillan's phrase) with Lady Eden. (Note: Pamela Berry was another of Lady Eden's acquaintances who had taken accommodation at the Dorchester Hotel during the Second World War.) The latter's attempts to make up this puzzling rift were shunned. (Note: It is worth noting that, in 1962, Nancy Mitford, who had once been very close to Lady Pamela, wrote to Evelyn Waugh that "she is spoilt ... her faults are getting worse and she doesn't mellow". In the same year, Waugh observed that "Pam joins Randolph [Churchill] among the legion of the damned" after she had betrayed a confidence in the columns of The Daily Telegraph. Lady Pamela died in 1982, but there have been suggestions that, in 1988, a Telegraph obituary of Beryl Maudling, widow of Reginald Maudling, Eden's Minister of Supply and Chancellor of the Exchequer under Macmillan, was "unnecessarily spiteful" because, as Maudling's biographer put it, of "some personal matter connected with the Maudlings' relationship with the Berry family".)

=== Chatelaine at Downing Street and Chequers ===
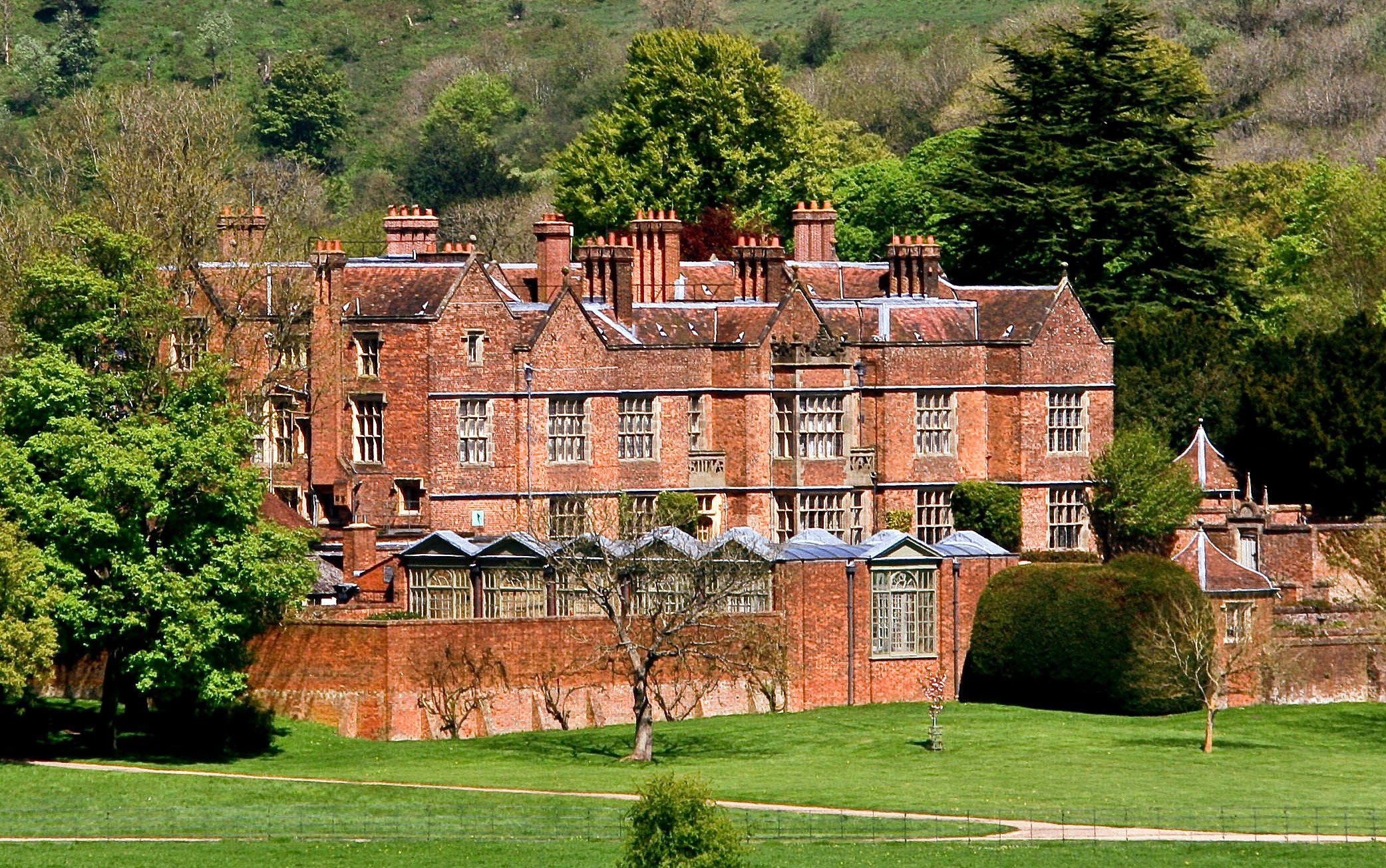
Chequers in Buckinghamshire, 2018

As hostess at 10 Downing Street, Lady Eden oversaw the organisation of official receptions. She brought in new caterers, causing US secretary of state John Foster Dulles to lose a bet with a fellow dinner guest that he knew "exactly what every course is going to be". Because the Edens' tenure was so short, Lady Eden's plans to return the fabric and furniture of the house to the styles of the 1730s, when it was built, were never realised.

Lady Eden was not very fond of Chequers, though she did take a keen interest in the garden and grounds, introducing old-fashioned roses and increasing the range of fruit trees. However, her successor, Lady Dorothy Macmillan, so keen a horticulturalist that she sometimes gardened at night, removed yellow and white flowers planted by Lady Eden and replaced them with roses of a "normal [colour]". (Note: Even so, Lady Dorothy, who, like Lady Eden, did not like Chequers much, complained to her daughter-in-law that "they would never let [me] plant anything ... they want me to plant pansies" ("and she didn't like pansies").) One episode at Chequers attracted considerable publicity. In January 1956, Lady Eden politely requested the occupant of a farm worker's cottage on the estate to hang her washing where visitors could not see it. Although it seems that the washing may have been hung across a lime walk, beyond the boundary of the cottage garden itself, the story was taken up by the Daily Mirror as an alleged example of Lady Eden's high-handedness. Coming shortly after attacks in the press on Eden's leadership, the timing was unfortunate.

In April 1956, Lady Eden hosted a dinner at Chequers for the visiting Soviet leaders Nikita Khrushchev and Nikolai Bulganin. Khrushchev noted that Lady Eden's (sober) behaviour contradicted a briefing from the Soviet embassy in London that she shared some of Churchill's "traits in the matter of drinking". Over dinner (when, according to his hostess, he ate nothing despite his reputation for eating and drinking greedily (Note: Macmillan regarded such greed as an indication of Khruschev's inner character, rather as Anthony Eden had taken a similar view of Benito Mussolini's objectionable table manners in the 1930s.)), he responded rather bluntly to her question about the range of Soviet missiles that "they could easily reach your island and quite a bit farther". (Note: Khrushchev noted that Lady Eden "bit her tongue" at this answer, which he admitted was "a little rude".) The following morning, Khrushchev mistook Lady Eden's room for Bulganin's but, having provoked a cry after almost walking in on her, beat a hasty retreat and did not identify himself. He confided later in Bulganin, with whom he "had a good laugh over [the] incident".

=== Suez Crisis ===
As the Suez Crisis climaxed in 1956, the Labour Party opposed Anglo-French attacks on Egypt. On 1 November, Lady Eden found herself sitting next to Dora Gaitskell, wife of the Labour leader, in the gallery of the House of Commons, whose sitting was suspended, due to uproar, for the first time since 1924. "Can you stand it?" she asked, to which, according to one version, the seasoned Gaitskell replied, "the boys must have their fun". (An alternative version is that Gaitskell responded, "What I can't stand is the mounted police charging the crowds outside".) Three days later, Lady Eden attended, out of curiosity, an anti-government "Law not War" demonstration in Trafalgar Square but thought it sensible to withdraw when she was recognised with friendly cheers.

==== "The Suez Canal flowing through my drawing room" ====
In the humiliating aftermath of the crisis in 1956, Lady Eden's most famous public remark to a group of Conservative women that, "in the past few weeks I have really felt as if the Suez Canal was flowing through my drawing room", was widely reported. The future Lady Avon later described this observation as "silly, really idiotic", though it remains probably the most quoted utterance of the whole crisis. One example of its durability was a journalist's observation some 54 years later, with reference to the Iraq War of 2003, that "if, as Clarissa Eden remarked, the Suez Canal ran through her drawing room, Iraq and the decisions that flowed from it still haunt [the] Labour [Party] and stir up antipathies and discomforts". Another instance was in 2013 when options for airport expansion around London were being debated: The Times newspaper cited Avon's words in 2011 in connection with a call by the outgoing Cabinet Secretary Sir Gus (later Lord) O'Donnell for prime ministerial spouses to receive greater support from public funds: "In a constitutional monarchy, the consort of the prime minister is not an official role ... Yet, as the Countess of Avon so vividly pointed out, it can be impossible to keep public scrutiny at bay altogether". In Avon's view, both she and her husband "were quite naive about how the press works. Neither of us should have been, but we were."

In his memoirs, Anthony Eden recalled that on several occasions during the crisis, he found time to sit in his wife's drawing room, whose décor he described as green. There he was able to enjoy two sanguines by André Derain and a bronze of a girl in her bath by Degas that Alexander Korda had given the Edens as a wedding present.

=== Political influence ===
During this period, some thought they detected undue influence by Lady Eden over her husband. For example, Lady Jebb, wife of the British ambassador in Paris, alluded in her diary to Shakespeare's Lady Macbeth and referred to "Clarissa's war". (It should be borne in mind, however, that her husband, Sir Gladwyn, a "figure of some grandeur, if not hauteur", was furious at his exclusion from an Anglo-French summit in Paris two weeks before the Suez invasion.) In December 1956, Walter Monckton, a member of Eden's government who opposed the Suez invasion, apparently told a Labour MP, Anthony Wedgwood Benn, that Lady Eden was a powerful force in politics, with great influence on her husband, and that "now she knows [Monckton] opposed Anthony she won't have anything to do with him". Monckton claimed, among other things, that, during a rail strike in 1955, Eden, by then prime minister, had, at his wife's urging, taken a tougher public stance concerning the railwaymen than that advised by Monckton, as Minister of Labour, and senior civil servants (although there is evidence that Churchill had also privately advocated to Eden the need for a strong line).

In private correspondence just after Suez, the Oxford historian Hugh Trevor-Roper derided Lady Eden's remark about "the Suez Canal flowing through [her] drawing room" and declared not only that the "vain and foolish" Eden was "wholly managed" by her, but that she would listen only to Cecil Beaton, whom he described (with reference to the Svengali of the last Russian czarina Alexandra) as her "Rasputin".

=== Protective influence ===
Less dramatically, there were suggestions that Anthony Eden's touchiness and over-sensitivity to criticism, characteristics frequently remarked upon by colleagues, were exacerbated by Lady Eden (described by historian Barry Turner, without explanation, as "equally touchy"). One of Eden's private secretaries claimed that she had a habit of "stirring up Anthony when he didn't need it". However, Eden's biographer D. R. Thorpe concluded that such imputations arose from a misreading of the Edens' relationship, also noting that, during Suez, the only two people in whom Eden could confide without inhibition were his wife and the Queen. Indeed, as historian Ben Pimlott put it, "if Lady Eden came to believe that the Suez Canal flowed through her drawing room, the Queen must have felt pretty damp as well". David Dutton, another (not notably sympathetic) biographer of Eden, noted that "some observers believed that Clarissa was excessively protective and tended to exacerbate Eden's natural volatility" but also remarked on her devoted companionship and that "during the dark days of the Suez Crisis, [she] was at his side, supportive throughout". (Note: Whatever effect Lady Eden had on Eden's temperament, it has been far from uncommon for prime ministerial behaviour to be influenced by protective spouses. Despite strong evidence of Sarah Brown's calming influence on her husband, Gordon Brown, who was prime minister from 2007 to 2010, it has been suggested that "her intense love and protection ... made her deeply angry when he was under attack, and this could heighten his paranoia about those who were seeking to do him down". It is clear also that, at various stages before and during the Falklands War of 1982, Prime Minister Margaret Thatcher received from her husband, Denis, the sort of moral support that it was difficult for others to provide.)

Eden paid tribute to his wife's adaptation of their domestic arrangements to meet the "unsteady requirements" of this period, noting that his digestion took less kindly to them. There is some evidence also that, when he was Foreign Secretary, Lady Eden had influenced (or, at any rate, endorsed) his patterns of work. A later Foreign Secretary, Douglas Hurd, observed that, though he worked hard, Eden did not keep office hours and often spent mornings working in bed. For example, on 29 December 1952, Eden wrote: "Raining and cold. Clarissa says that this is the right way to run the F[oreign].O[ffice]. Lie in bed, direct office by telephone and read Delacroix". (Note: Such working methods were by no means unique: Churchill frequently worked in bed and often slept in the afternoon. Monday, 29 December 1952, was the first working day after Christmas, and Eden's (and his wife's) remarks may, to an extent, have been tongue-in-cheek.)

Some of Lady Eden's friends may have concealed their true views about Suez. For example, Isaiah Berlin assured "dearest Clarissa" that Eden had acted with "great moral splendour", describing his stance as "very brave", "very patriotic" and "absolutely just", while opining to another acquaintance that his policy had been "childish folly". (Note: Berlin seems to have had a reputation for saying one thing to one person and something different to another.) The future Lady Avon herself recalled that, though she sought to "bolster up" her husband and scanned the newspapers for anything that she thought he ought to know, she did not feel she "knew enough about what was going on to try and interfere in any way". Even so, her knowledge of the inner workings of government was such that she was able to record in her diary the precise stance, at a critical point of the Suez operation, of every member of the Cabinet:

[E]ach was asked in turn what they felt about going on. Selwyn [Lloyd], Alec Home, Harold [Macmillan], Alan [Lennox-Boyd], Antony Head, Peter [Thorneycroft], [Sir David] Eccles, Duncan [Sandys], James Stuart, Gwilym [Lloyd George], and [Lord] Hailsham were for going on. [Lord] Kilmuir, [Derick] Heathcoat Amory, [Iain] Macleod, Bobbety [Lord Salisbury], Patrick Buchan-Hepburn were for doing whatever Anthony wanted and Lord Selkirk was unintelligible.

=== Aftermath of Suez ===
==== Goldeneye ====
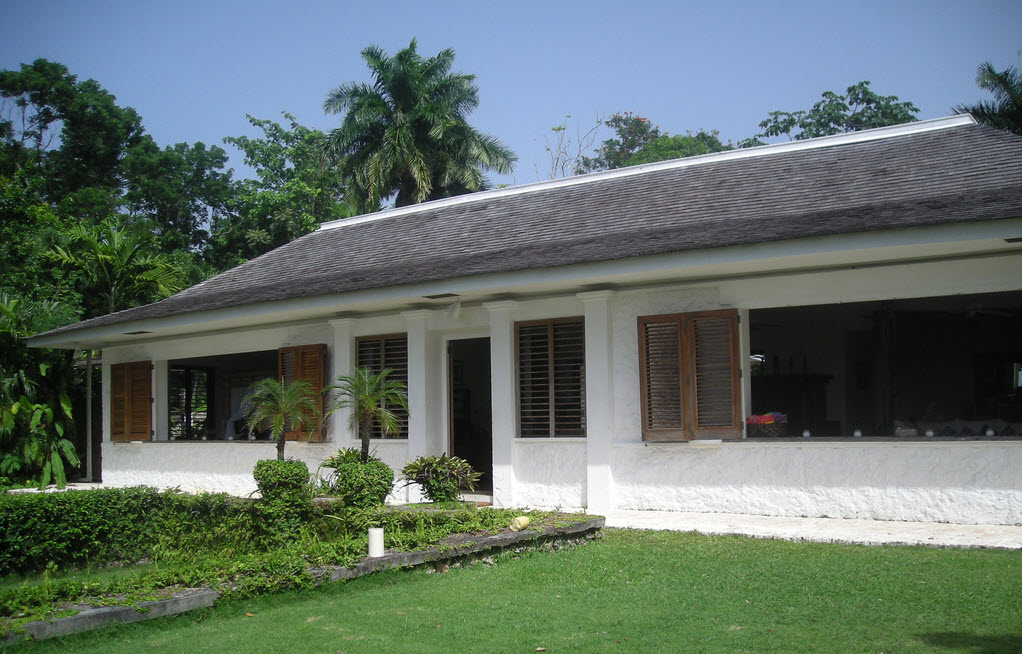
Goldeneye in Jamaica, 2011

The damage caused by the Suez Crisis to the Prime Minister's already frail health persuaded the Edens to seek a month's rest cure at "Goldeneye", Ian Fleming's "plain, low-roofed" bungalow on the north coast of Jamaica. Lady Eden's concern for her husband's health appears to have been decisive in the choice of destination. Still, this location was regarded by many, including Macmillan and the government's Chief Whip, Edward Heath, as politically unwise. In addition, although Goldeneye had a private beach and a large living room with glassless louvre windows that enabled "the moist tropical air [to] blow through", Fleming's close friend, the journalist Denis Hamilton, who visited Goldeneye around that time, recalled a "shack-like house" which Fleming "went around pretending [was] ... a great palace ... a miniature Ritz". (Note: Hamilton appears to have visited Fleming in Jamaica while he was writing From Russia, with Love, which was published in 1957.) Its bedrooms have been described as "insignificant and small". Ann Fleming warned Lady Eden about some of its primitive aspects. She suggested that Torquay, a seaside resort in the southwest of England, and a sun lamp might have been preferable. However, Lady Eden insisted that "Berkshire [Chequers] or somewhere instead" would not have been suitable: "I thought if we didn't go to Jamaica, he was going to drop down dead, literally". (Note: As regards Chequers, Eden's wariness about its effect on his health was long-standing. In November 1942, at a delicate point in the Second World War, he confided to his diary: "I don't know why it is that Chequers never suits me. Cold still heavy ... and Rossdale's [his doctor's] cocaine makes me feel giddy". The Soviet leader Khrushchev, whom the Edens entertained at Chequers in 1956, noted "an unpleasant odour and a sticky film all over everything inside the house" due to the burning of anthracite in iron stoves.)

Installed in Jamaica after a good deal of secrecy and close liaison between Downing Street and Ian Fleming's secretary, Una Trueblood, (Note: Despite Lady Eden's close friendship with Ann Fleming, it appears that, because of the need for secrecy, the initial approach to Ian Fleming was made by a senior government minister, Alan Lennox-Boyd, who gave the impression that he himself wanted Goldeneye for a holiday. Una Trueblood was probably the model for Mary Trueblood, a glamorous MI6 secretary in Fleming's Dr. No (1958).) the Edens were temporary neighbours of Noël Coward who thought Goldeneye "perfectly ghastly" (Note: Coward thought Goldenye looked like a medical centre and referred to it as "Goldeneye, nose and throat". Coward recalled the contrast between the lifestyle of James Bond in Fleming's books and that at Goldeneye. He claimed that he used to cross himself before eating there because the food was so "abominable"—"his guests remembered all those delicious meals had put into his books".) and presented them—"poor dears"—with a basket of caviare, pâté de foie gras and champagne. Coward also sent Frank Cooper's marmalade and Huntley and Palmer's biscuits, which, according to the future Lady Avon, "was not what we had been looking forward to". As was sometimes the case when Fleming let Goldeneye, he asked his neighbour (and lover) Blanche Blackwell, a member of the influential Lindo family, to ensure that the Edens were properly looked after. (Note: Blackwell (1912–2017), who Ann Fleming described as "my husband's Jamaican wife", has often been cited as the inspiration for the character of Pussy Galore in Fleming's novel Goldfinger. She died at the age of 104. Her son Chris founded Island Records.) Indeed, it seems that Lady Eden's mentioning that Blackwell had been helpful at Goldeneye led Ann Fleming to suspect that her husband and Blackwell were having an affair. The publicity that the Edens' sojourn attracted is credited by some with boosting Fleming's literary career, including sales of his early novels about James Bond, the first of which, Casino Royale, he had written at Goldeneye in 1952. (Note: Cannadine (2002, p. 285) refers to "a sojourn which did nothing for Eden's reputation but a great deal for Fleming's". Another factor in the success of the Bond books, a few years later, was the enthusiastic endorsement of US president John F. Kennedy and his brother Robert. Allen Dulles, Director of the Central Intelligence Agency, was also a fan, exchanging copies of Bond novels with President Kennedy and adding his own comments in the margins. The first Bond film, Dr. No, did not appear until 1962.) The future Lady Avon later recalled her "astonishment" (and Ann Fleming's "rueful embarrassment") at the success of the Bond books, which continued after From Russia, with Love entered the best-seller lists in 1957. (Note: Rankin (2011, p. 333) has speculated that "the cultural snobbery of his wife, Ann, and her friends" may have told Fleming that "there was something suspect in the thriller genre ... that it was not the 99.99 per cent pure gold of proper literature".)

==== Eden's resignation ====
The Edens flew back to England just before Christmas 1956. A young witness of their departure from Kingston airport recalled Lady Eden looking "glacial" and her husband pale. Lady Eden noted that, on their return, "everyone [was] looking at us with thoughtful eyes". Early in January 1957, the Edens stayed with the Queen at Sandringham, where Eden informed her of his intention to resign as prime minister. Eden tendered his resignation formally at Buckingham Palace on 9 January. When Harold Macmillan was appointed his successor in preference to R. A. Butler, Lady Eden wrote to Butler (whom two years earlier she had described in her diary as "curiously unnatural") that she thought politics "a beastly profession ... and how greatly I admire your dignity and good humour". (Note: Writing to Eden on 10 January 1956 to say "goodbye with all my affection to you and to Clarissa", the future prime minister Lord Home observed that "politics is in some ways a nasty profession ...".) (In 1952 she had told Duff Cooper that she thought modern politics something of a "farce".)

Macmillan's biographer Alistair Horne noted that, of the various animosities that arose before and during Macmillan's premiership, it was the "loyal wives", among whom he counted Lady Eden and Lady Butler, who "tended most to keep [them] alive". Although there is evidence of a long-standing and lasting rift between Eden and Macmillan, Eden himself maintained "a friendly (if not conspicuously warm) relationship" with his successor, often being used as a "sounding board" by Macmillan who occasionally lunched with the Edens at their home. Lady Eden, on the other hand, was said to have been consistently vitriolic about Macmillan and recalled to one of Eden's biographers that Churchill had found him "too 'viewy'". There is some evidence that, following Suez, Macmillan had briefed sections of the press that he intended to retire, whereas his true intention had been to displace Eden as prime minister, and, as late as 2007, the future Lady Avon criticised his behaviour as Chancellor of the Exchequer during the crisis, claiming that he had been "too hasty" in using an American threat to withhold a loan from the International Monetary Fund as "an excuse to back down" from military action and had wept "crocodile tears" at Eden's resignation. (Note: US vice-president Richard Nixon was the source of Eisenhower's regrets. According to Jonathan Aitken, Macmillan advised Margaret Thatcher in 1982 to exclude the Chancellor of the Exchequer from her Falklands War Cabinet to avoid Treasury influence on decision making.)

Shortly after Eden's resignation, he and Lady Eden sailed to New Zealand for a further break. Their cabin steward, on what she described as "the hellship Rangitata", was the future deputy prime minister John Prescott. Half a century later Prescott recalled that, while kneeling to clean the ship's brass, he had occasion to admire a pair of legs that turned out to be Lady Eden's—"You naturally look, don't you"—after which Anthony Eden tapped him on the head. (Note: According to one account, Prescott felt patronised by Eden during the voyage and retaliated by contriving "accidentally" to spill hot soup over Eden's crotch.) When they arrived in New Zealand, which was among the few countries publicly to have supported the Suez operation, the Edens received a rapturous "red carpet" reception.

== Eden's retirement and death ==
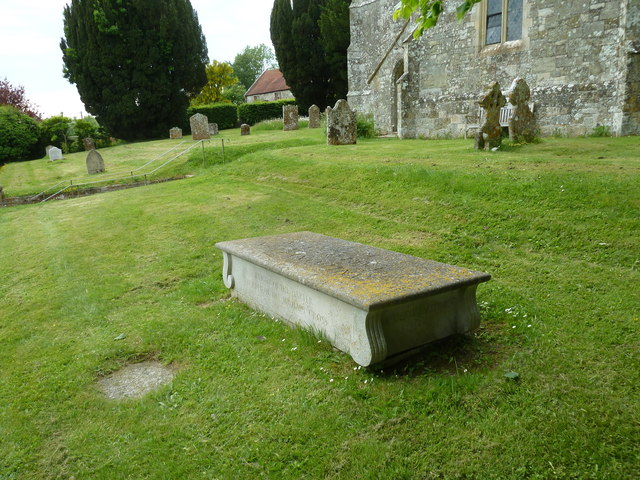
Eden's grave in the churchyard of St Mary's, Alvediston, 2013

Doctors had told Eden that his life might be in danger if he remained in office. However, he was to live for another twenty years. The Avons' home was at Alvediston Manor, Wiltshire, where he died on 14 January 1977 and is buried. The last entry in Eden's diary, dated 11 September 1976, had read, "[e]xquisite small vase of crimson glory buds & mignonette from beloved C[larissa]."

When Eden was taken mortally ill with liver cancer, he and Lady Avon had just spent their final Christmas together at Hobe Sound, Florida, as guests of former New York governor W. Averell Harriman, an elder statesman of the Democratic Party, and his English-born wife Pamela. (Mrs Harriman was Lady Avon's exact contemporary, a débutante of 1938 (Note: The Dowager Duchess of Devonshire, also a débutante in 1938, recalled Pamela Digby (as she then was) as "rather fat, fast and the butt of many teases".) who had also taken a room at the Dorchester during the Second World War. She had previously been married to Lady Avon's cousin Randolph Churchill and in the 1990s was US president Bill Clinton's ambassador to Paris, where she died in 1997.) The Avons were flown back to Britain in a Royal Air Force VC-10 that was diverted to Miami after Prime Minister James Callaghan had been alerted to his health situation by Pamela Harriman's son, Winston.

== Widowhood ==
After her husband's death, Lady Avon received many tributes for her devoted care in the later stages of his life. She moved to an apartment in London in the 1980s. She invited firstly Robert Rhodes James and later D. R. Thorpe to write official biographies of her husband (Churchill's biographer, Martin Gilbert, having previously declined an invitation). Published in 1986 and 2003 respectively, both offered a broadly sympathetic view of Eden's career and were generally well-received by critics. Between them, they did much to help restore Eden's reputation, which had taken such a battering during the final months of his premiership. In 2003 a research study by a Harvard clinician of Eden's medical condition and surgery during the 1950s was published in the US with an acknowledgement of Lady Avon's interest and co-operation.

Lady Avon remained in touch with many influential friends. For example, in the lead-up to the Falklands War of 1982, the Lord Chancellor, Lord Hailsham, confided during a cabinet meeting that the former US secretary of state Henry Kissinger had spoken to Lady Avon of the risk of a "[s]ocialist" regime being established in Argentina. (Note: Kissinger was presumably referring to a possible consequence of Britain's evicting Argentine forces from the Falkland Islands, which they had invaded in April 1982, or of a political and economic backlash against American interests if the US publicly supported Britain.) Lady Avon also attended various state occasions, as well as gatherings of former prime ministers and their families. In 1972 (while her husband was still alive), she described to Cecil Beaton the Duchess of Windsor's "very strange" and nervous demeanour—"Is this my seat?" "Is this my prayer book?" "What do I do now?"—at the funeral of her husband, the former king Edward VIII, (Note: Eden had been Foreign Secretary throughout Edward's short reign. Lady Avon also commented to Beaton on the Queen's "motherly and nannie-like tenderness" towards the Duchess at the funeral.) while thirty years later, Tony Blair's press secretary Alastair Campbell noted that at a dinner at 10 Downing Street in 2002 to mark the Queen's Golden Jubilee, attended by five prime ministers and several relatives of deceased prime ministers:

Prince Philip was deep in conversation with T[ony] B[lair], the Countess of Avon, Macmillan's and Douglas-Home's families, and there was lots of reminiscing about life in Number 10. (Note: Invitations to a comparable luncheon to mark the Queen's Diamond Jubilee in 2012 were restricted to (surviving) prime ministers and their spouses.)

In 1994, 17 years after her husband's death, Lady Avon unveiled a bust of Eden at the Foreign Office. In 2013 she attended a memorial service for Sir Guy Millard (1917–2013), one of Eden's long-serving private secretaries and probably his last surviving close associate, having been with him and Churchill at wartime meetings with Roosevelt and Stalin and in Downing Street during the Suez Crisis.

=== Longevity ===
Lady Avon was the youngest wife of an incumbent prime minister in the twentieth century. She was only 36 when her husband resigned and was widowed at 56. She outlived five later prime ministerial spouses and witnessed the administrations of 13 subsequent prime ministers. By contrast, Lady Dorothy Macmillan was 57 when her husband succeeded Eden and 63 when he resigned, dying just three years later; her husband outlived her by 20 years. As such, Avon enjoyed unusual longevity for a prime ministerial spouse, contributing, for example, to a television documentary by Cherie Blair in 2005 about prime ministers' wives and to a three-part series the following year marking the 50th anniversary of Suez. In the latter, she recalled, among other things, Eden's disillusion with the lack of American support for British policy in 1956. The critic A. A. Gill was among those who praised Avon's erudite performance in the Blair documentary ("bright as a button") while sensing that she appeared not entirely to approve of Cherie Blair.

Avon was 87 when her memoir appeared in 2007. A journalist who interviewed her and her editor, Cate Haste, observed that Avon "seems slight and wan, as if painted in watercolour rather than oil" but described her as "vigorous and knowing" in conversation. In April 2008 she and Haste appeared at the Sunday Times Oxford Literary Festival, the literature for this event observing that, although Avon was perhaps best known for her lament about "the Suez Canal flowing through [her] drawing room", "she was far more than a drawing-room consort".

Avon died at her home in Marylebone, London, on 15 November 2021, aged 101. She was the second longest-lived prime ministerial spouse after Lady Wilson of Rievaulx, widow of Harold Wilson, who died in 2018 aged 102. Her funeral took place on 24 November in Alvediston, where she was laid to rest at her husband's side in the churchyard.

== In popular culture ==
Lady Avon was played by Jennifer Daniel in Ian Curteis's 1979 drama for BBC television, Suez 1956. In 2012 she was portrayed by Abigail Cruttenden in Hugh Whitemore's play about the Suez Crisis, A Marvellous Year for Plums, that opened at the Chichester Festival Theatre. In the first episode of the BBC's The Hour, also set in 1956, a television producer Bel Rowley (Romola Garai) was complimented by one of Eden's press officers for a feature about "Lady Eden at home". In the Netflix drama series The Crown, she was portrayed by Anna Madeley.

== Arms ==
Coat of arms of Clarissa Eden
Escutcheon The arms of Eden (Gules on a chevron between three garbs or, banded vert, as many escallops sable.) impaled with Spencer-Churchill (Quarterly: 1st and 4th, Sable a lion rampant Argent on a canton of the second a cross Gules (Churchill); 2nd and 3rd, quarterly Argent and Gules, in the second and third quarters a fret Or, overall on a bend Sable three escallops of the first (Spencer); in chief, on an escutcheon Argent a cross Gules surmounted by an inescutcheon Azure charged with three fleurs-de-lys Or.) Supporters On the dexter side a leopard guardant Or resting the sinister hind paw on a garb Or banded Vert and on the sinister side a like leopard resting the dexter hind paw on a similar garb.
