= The Girls of Radcliff Hall =

1932 novel by Gerald Berners

First privately printed edition

The Girls of Radcliff Hall is a roman à clef novel in the form of a lesbian girls' school story written in the 1930s by the British composer and bon-vivant Gerald Berners, the 14th Lord Berners, under the pseudonym "Adela Quebec", published and distributed privately in 1932. Berners depicts himself and his circle of friends, including Cecil Beaton and Oliver Messel, as lesbian schoolgirls at a school named "Radcliff Hall" (punning on the name of the famous lesbian writer). The indiscretions alluded to in the novel created an uproar among Berners's intimates and acquaintances. Cecil Beaton attempted to have all the copies destroyed. The novel subsequently disappeared from circulation, making it extremely rare. The story is not included in the Berners anthology Collected Tales and Fantasies, but it was reprinted, with some additional explanatory material, in 2000 thanks to the efforts of Dorothy Lygon.

The characters and their real-life selves, according to an annotation in Cyril Connolly's copy of the novel, and endorsed by Robert Heber-Percy with the annotation "How did you guess?", are:

- Miss Carfax (this choice of name was presumably related to Sibyl Colefax, with whom Berners was acquainted): Lord Berners
- Miss MacRogers: Jimmy Foster
- Olive Mason: Oliver Messel
- Cecily Seymour: Cecil Beaton
- Daisy Montegomery: David Herbert
- Lizzie Johnson: Peter Watson
- Millie Roberts: Robert Heber-Percy
- Madame Yoshiwara: Pavel Tchelitchew
- Mademoiselle Gousse: Christian Bérard
- Helene de Troy: Jack Wilson
- Vivian Dorrick: Doris Castlerosse
- May Peabody: Robin Thomas (USA).

== Editions ==
- "Adela Quebec", The Girls of Radcliff Hall, privately printed, 1932
- Gerald Hugh Tyrwhitt-Wilson Berners, Lord Berners (ed. John Byrne), The Girls of Radcliff Hall, 2000, ISBN 0-907435-13-0, ISBN 1-893450-06-6

== Foreword ==
The first edition, but not the second edition, contains the following satirical foreword:

FOREWORD

By the Bishop of Brixton

WHEN first my friend and erstwhile parishioner Adela Quebec invited me to write an introduction to her little book, The Girls of Radcliff Hall, I must admit that I was filled with diffidence. I felt that, for a member of the Church of England, possessing no pretensions whatever to literary taste and above all handicapped by a complete ignorance of the subject of which the book treats, it would be a task that lay entirely outside my province.

But after I had finished reading her charming little work, all such diffidence fell from me. Here, I said to myself, is something that has an universal appeal. Nobody, in whatever walk of life, of whatever calling, could fail to be fascinated by the freshness, the delicious naiveté of this delightful chronicle of a Girls' School, with its charming descriptions of the romantic friendships of its inmates, descriptions that rival in their delicacy of touch, the illustrations of an early nineteenth century botany book.

Miss Quebec's little volume exhales so fragrant an atmosphere of charm and innocence that, after reading it, I felt as though I had been walking in a garden full of lilies and roses. In fact I was reminded of that exquisite picture by Sargent, 'Carnation lily, lily rose', except that here the theme is treated more naively and that in the place of Sargent's consummate mastery of technique one finds a fresher, less sophisticated treatment resembling that of Fra Angelico or some other primitive Italian artist.

We follow the development of the various characters in the story with the same eager curiosity with which we watch the unfolding of the buds in our herbaceous borders, and upon laying down the book we are left with a longing to pursue still further the fortunes of the talented Cecily, the impulsive Lizzie, Daisy and Olive, with their vivid interest in the welfare of the school, Millie the Tomboy, and, above all, the benevolent Headmistress who watches over her little flock with such maternal solicitude.

It is sincerely to be hoped that Miss Adela Quebec will gratify us with a sequel.
