= Jennifer Ross =

British magazine financier (1916–2003)

- Born: Ann Jennifer Evelyn Elizabeth Fry; 16 March 1916
- Died: 10 December 2003 (aged 87)
- Occupation: Socialite

Ann Jennifer Evelyn Elizabeth Ross (née Fry; 16 March 1916 – 10 December 2003) was a British literary muse who for a time financed The London Magazine.

She was the only child of Sir Geoffrey Fry, 1st Baronet and his wife Alathea Gardner. She grew up at Oare House, Wiltshire. Her father was private secretary to two prime ministers, and descended from the Quaker family of cocoa manufacturers. Her mother was the daughter of Lord Burghclere. Alathea's sister was Evelyn Gardner, who married the writer Evelyn Waugh and was known as one of the Bright Young Things of interwar London.

In 1942, already pregnant, Ann Fry married Robert Heber-Percy, who had for the past decade been the boyfriend of the composer Lord Berners, and was known as "the Mad Boy". For two years she formed a ménage à trois with them at Faringdon House, Oxfordshire.

They divorced in 1947. She loved and was loved by men such as Cyril Connolly, Henry Green, and the filmmaker Michael Luke. She next married, in 1949, the poet Alan Ross, editor of The London Magazine, which she supported with her money and intellect. She championed Jean Rhys's novel Wide Sargasso Sea to Francis Wyndham.

Her friends included "[Sir] John Betjeman ... Anthony and Violet Powell, Heywood and Anne Hill, [and] Prim Rollo, who married the actor David Niven".

She volunteered with the Prisoners' Wives Service, which Cressida Connolly links to her relative Elizabeth Fry, the great social reformer.

Her daughter with Heber-Percy, Victoria Gala Heber-Percy, was born in 1943. She married the British composer, musician and inventor Peter Zinovieff. Their children included the author Sofka Zinovieff, who in 2014 wrote a memoir about her grandparents and Lord Berners at Faringdon.
