= Lady Dorothy Lygon =

English socialite (1912–2001)

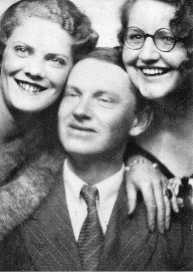
- Mary Lygon, Evelyn Waugh and Dorothy Lygon
- Born: 22 February 1912
- Died: 13 November 2001 (aged 89)
- Other names: Mrs Robert Heber-Percy
- Occupations: socialite, archivist
- Spouse: Robert Heber-Percy (m. 1985; div. 1986)
- Parents: William Lygon, 7th Earl Beauchamp (father); Lady Lettice Grosvenor (mother)

Lady Dorothy Lygon (briefly Heber-Percy; 22 February 1912 – 13 November 2001) was an English socialite, and one of the Bright Young Things. She served as a Flight Officer in the Women's Auxiliary Air Force during WWII, and later became an archivist.

== Biography ==
Lygon was born on 22 February 1912, the daughter of William Lygon, 7th Earl Beauchamp and Lady Lettice Grosvenor, daughter of Victor Grosvenor, Earl Grosvenor and granddaughter of the 1st Duke of Westminster.

Her friendship with Evelyn Waugh began in the early 1930s. To Lygon, Waugh explained that the Lygons were only part of inspiration for the novel Brideshead Revisited; Dorothy most likely inspired the character of Lady Cordelia Flyte. According to Laura (née Herbert), Waugh's wife, Dorothy was "the nicest of all" her husband's friends. Waugh dedicated Black Mischief to Mary and Dorothy Lygon.

During World War II, Lygon served as a Flight Officer in the Women's Auxiliary Air Force posted to Italy. After the war she moved to a farm in Gloucestershire. In the 1950s, she worked as social secretary at the British Embassy in Athens. In 1956, she moved to Istanbul, working as a governess. She then moved to the Hydra. In the 1960s she moved back to England and worked as an archivist at Christie's.

In 1985, she married Robert Heber-Percy, the former companion/lover of the composer Lord Berners until the latter's death in 1950, when Robert inherited Faringdon House in Oxfordshire. They "parted amicably" a year later. She was instrumental in re-publishing in 2000 the lost work The Girls of Radcliff Hall. She died in 2001, aged 89.
