= 1929 Dissolution Honours =

British government recognitions

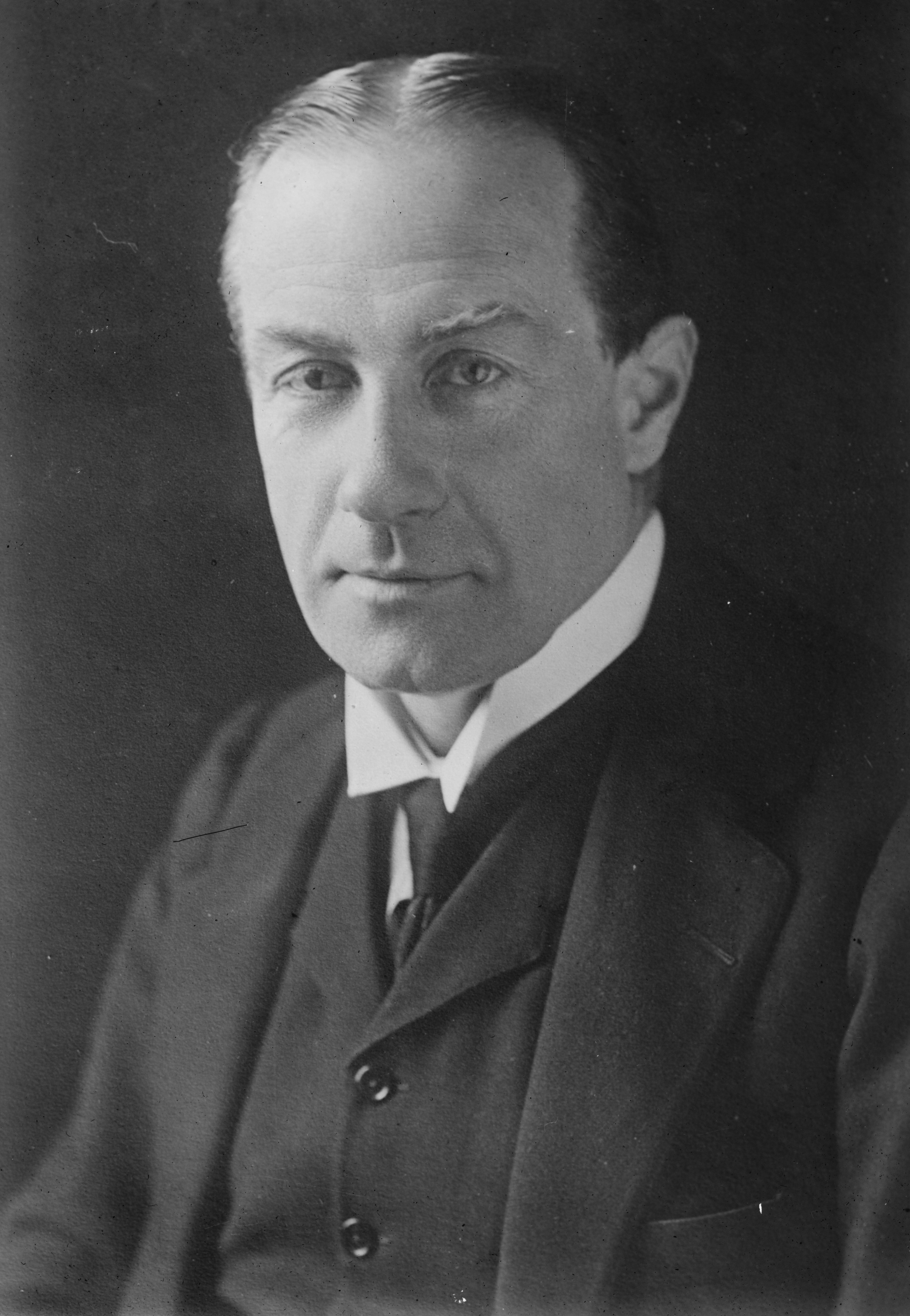
Outgoing Prime Minister Stanley Baldwin in 1920

The 1929 Dissolution Honours List was issued on 28 June 1929 at the advice of the outgoing Prime Minister, Stanley Baldwin.

== Earldom ==
- Rt Hon William Peel, 2nd Viscount Peel, GBE

== Viscountcy ==
- Rt Hon Sir William Joynson-Hicks, Bt, MP

== Baronies ==
- Rt Hon Sir Hamar Greenwood, Bt, KC, for political and public services.
- Sir George Lawson Johnston, KBE, JP, for philanthropic and public services.
- Sir Gilbert Wills, Bt, OBE, JP, for public and political services.
- Major Robert Yerburgh, for political and public services.

== Privy Council ==
- Douglas Hewitt Hacking, OBE, MP
- Captain Rt Hon Francis Curzon, 5th Earl Howe, CBE, VD, RNVR, for political and public services.
- Commodore Henry Douglas King, CB, CBE, DSO, VD, RNVR, MP.
- Sir Francis William Lowe, Bt.
- Rt Hon Ivor Windsor-Clive, 2nd Earl of Plymouth
- Sir Philip Sassoon, Bt, GBE, CMG, MP
- Roundell Palmer, Viscount Wolmer, MP

== Baronets ==
- Albert James Bennett, JP, MP, for political and public services.
- Henry Bucknall Betterton, CBE, MP
- Sir Alfred Butt, MP, for political and public services.
- Sir Patrick Ford, MP, for political and public services in Scotland.
- Geoffrey Storrs Fry, CB, CVO, for services to the former Prime Minister since 1923.
- Lieutenant-Colonel Sir Philip Richardson, OBE, VD, MP, for political and public services.

== Knighthoods ==
- Captain George Edward Wentworth Bowyer, MC, MP
- George Thomas Broadbridge, for political and public services.
- Julien Cahn, for philanthropic and public services.
- Major Philip Arthur Sambrooke Crawley, JP, for political and public services.
- James Malcolm Monteith Erskine, JP, for political and public services.
- Sydney Herbert Evershed, JP, for political and public services in the Borough of Burton-on-Trent.
- Frederick George Penny, MP
- Colonel Edwin King Perkins, CBE, VD, for political and public services.
- Ernest Whittome Shepperson, JP, MP, for political and public services.
- Alderman Frederick Smith, JP, for political and public services.
- John James Withers, CBE, MA, MP, for political and public services.

== The Most Honourable Order of the Bath ==
=== Companion (CB) ===
- Philip Tonstall Farrer, Private Secretary to the Marquess of Salisbury, late Leader of the House of Lords.

== Order of the British Empire ==
=== Knight Grand Cross (GBE) ===
- Sir Harold Bowden, Bt, for philanthropic and public services.
- Rt Hon Sir Philip Cunliffe-Lister, KBE, MC, MP.
- Commander the Rt Hon Sir Bolton Eyres-Monsell, RN (Retired), MP

=== Commander (CBE) ===
- The Rev Richard James Basil Patterson-Morgan, for political and public services in Northwich.

=== Officer (OBE) ===
- Maggie Mitchell, for political and public services.

=== Member (MBE) ===
- Miss Eileen Cecilia Feiling
- George Newburn, for political and public services.
