= Fry baronets =

Set index for Fry baronets

There have been two baronetcies created for members of the Fry family, both in the Baronetage of the United Kingdom. Both creations are extinct.

- Fry baronets of Woodburn (1894)
- Fry baronets of Oare (1929): see Sir Geoffrey Storrs Fry, 1st Baronet (1888–1960)
