= Alan Ross =

British poet, writer, editor and publisher (1922–2001)

Alan John Ross (6 May 1922 – 14 February 2001) was a British poet, writer, editor and publisher.

== Early years ==
Ross was born in Calcutta, India, son of John Brackenridge Ross, CBE, a former Lieutenant in the Indian Army Reserve (Supply and Transport Corps), a businessman involved in the coal-mining industry as a partner in Gilchrist, Peace & Ross, of Calcutta, "merchants and engineers, shipping, clearing and forwarding agents", managing agents for, amongst others, the Indian Coal and Mineral Syndicate Ltd and the Konda Colliery, and Clare Margaret, daughter of Captain Patrick Fitzpatrick of the Indian Army. When, aged seven, he was sent to be educated in Falmouth, England, he spoke better Hindustani than English. Following preparatory school, he boarded at Haileybury where, being both small for his age and a latecomer to his year, he initially suffered greatly from bullying – to his intense relief, the bully was killed in a cycling accident whilst on holiday – but his stock quickly rose when he revealed a talent which matched his passion for cricket. With a hint of the debonair style that was to characterise his life, Ross avoided participation in the OTC and all study of mathematics and science, instead enjoying art, French poetry and racquet sports. As a senior boy he was caned for making an unlicensed visit to Wimbledon; it was his misfortune that he figured, smoking a cigarette, in a photograph of spectators carried in his headmaster's newspaper the following morning.

In 1940 he went to read Modern Languages at St John's College, Oxford, where he was a contemporary of Philip Larkin and Kingsley Amis. Ross represented the university at both cricket and squash but did not complete his studies after joining the Royal Navy in 1941. Before doing so, he appeared in the annual match against Cambridge at Lord's in 1941, but because of the Second World War the fixture was reduced to a single day and did not have first-class status. In the same season he appeared in one one-day match for Northamptonshire.

== Naval career ==
During his first two years in the Royal Navy, Ross served on several destroyers escorting supply ships to the Soviet Union. On 30 December 1942 he was almost killed whilst serving aboard HMS Onslow (G17), the leading destroyer in a convoy assigned to fend off a strong flotilla of German capital ships intent on annihilating the arctic convoy JW 51B, at the Battle of the Barents Sea. He was ordered to take a turn controlling a fire below in the forward part of the ship and, to save the main body of the ship in the event of an explosion, sealed in for half an hour with a hose, armpit-deep in water, the bodies of two gun crews washing against him. The incident is vividly described in both his poem "J.W.51B a convoy" and his first volume of memoirs.

== Journalistic career ==
After he was demobilised in 1946 Ross decided not to resume his studies at Oxford, but instead to try his hand at journalism. In 1946 his first poetry collection The Derelict Day was published; it contained poems he had written whilst in the Navy. The following year the publisher John Lehmann funded him and the artist John Minton to travel to Corsica to produce the travel book Time Was Away.

Ross became a sports writer for The Observer in 1950, and became the paper's cricket correspondent in 1953, the same year his son was born. Throughout the 1950s he was a regular contributor to Lehmann's The London Magazine, before taking over as the title's editor in 1961. He edited the monthly magazine under the trimmed title London Magazine until his death; during this period it was transformed from an academic literary review to a far more cutting-edge review of the arts.

== Poetry ==
Ross came to prominence as a poet with poems inspired by his experience during the Second World War. He was one of the few poets who wrote poems in English about naval warfare during that war.

== Personal life ==
In 1949 Ross married Jennifer Fry, the only child of Sir Geoffrey Fry, 1st Baronet, of the Fry family who founded the chocolate company.

== Bibliography ==
- Time Was Away: a Notebook in Corsica (John Lehmann, 1948) – travel, memoir
- The Gulf of Pleasure (Weidenfeld & Nicolson, 1951) - travel (in Ischia, Naples, Procida etc.)
- The Bandit on the Billiard Table; a Journey through Sardinia (Derek Verschoyle, 1954) – travel
- The Onion Man (Hamish Hamilton, 1959) – children's book, illus. by Raymond Briggs
- Danger on Glass Island (Hamish Hamilton, 1960) – children's book, illus. Raymond Briggs
- The Wreck of Moni (Alan Ross, 1965) – children's book, illus. Raymond Briggs
- A Castle in Sicily (Alan Ross, 1966) – children's book, illus. Toni Patten
- Blindfold Games (Collins Harvill, 1986) – autobiography
- Coastwise Lights (Collins Harvill, 1988) – autobiography
- Keith Vaughan: Journals 1939-1977 – editor (John Murray, 1989) – Keith Vaughan
- Winter Sea: War, Journeys, Writers (Harvill Press, 1997) – travel, memoir
- Reflections on Blue Water: Journeys in the Gulf of Naples and in the Aeolian Islands (Harvill Press, 1999) – travel, memoir

=== Poetry ===
- The Derelict Day: Poems in Germany (John Lehmann, 1947)
- Something of the Sea (Derek Verschoyle, 1954)
- To Whom It May Concern (Hamish Hamilton, 1958)
- African Negatives (Eyre & Spottiswoode, 1962)
- North from Sicily: Poems in Italy 1961–64 (Eyre & Spottiswoode, 1965)
- Poems 1942–67 (Eyre & Spottiswoode, 1967)
- Tropical Ice (Covent Garden Press, 1972)
- The Taj Express: Poems 1967–73 (London Magazine Editions, 1973)
- Open Sea (London Magazine Editions, 1975)
- Death Valley and other Poems in America (London Magazine Editions, 1980)
- After Pusan (Harvill Press, 1995)
- Poems (Harvill Press, 2005)
- Poems Selected by Paul Vansittart (Greville Press Pamphlets, 2005)

=== Major works on cricket ===
- Australia 55: A Journal of the M.C.C. Tour (Michael Joseph, 1955)
- Cape Summer and the Australians in England (Hamish Hamilton, 1957)
- Through the Caribbean: England in the West Indies, 1960 (Hamish Hamilton, 1960)
- The Cricketer's Companion – editor (Eyre & Spottiswoode, 1960); republished as Kingswood Book of Cricket (1979)
- Australia 63 (Eyre & Spottiswoode, 1963)
- Crusoe on Cricket: the Cricket Writings of R. C. Robertson-Glasgow – editor (Alan Ross, 1966)
- Ranji: Prince of Cricketers (Harvill Press, 1983)
- An Australian Summer: The Recovery of the Ashes 1985 (Kingswood Press, 1985), with Patrick Eagar
- Green Fading into Blue: Writings on Cricket and other Sports (Andre Deutsch, 1999) – sporting memoir
