= Faringdon House =

Grade I listed house in Vale of White Horse, United Kingdom

Coordinates: 51.6612°N 1.5851°W

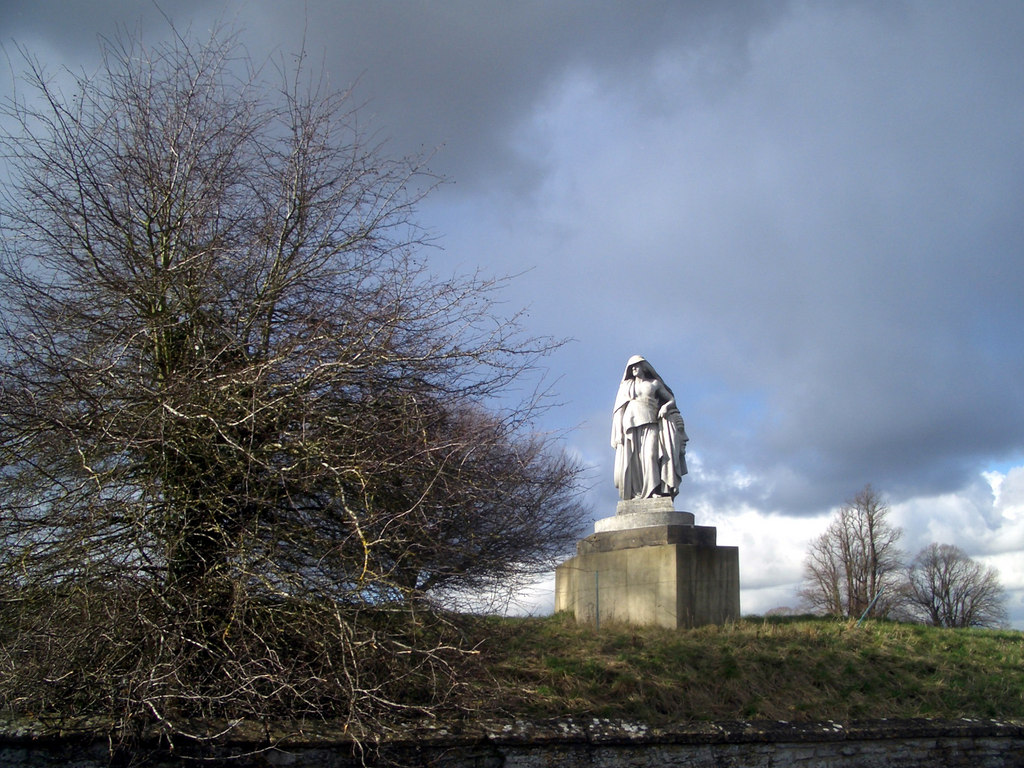
Statue in the grounds of Faringdon House

Faringdon House is a Grade I listed 14,510 square feet house in Faringdon, Oxfordshire, England. It was built in about 1770–1785 (241 years ago) for the Poet Laureate Sir Henry James Pye.

It became the country home of Lord Berners, who inherited it in 1918. He moved to Faringdon House in 1931, along with his companion, Robert Heber-Percy, nearly 30 years his junior and known as the Mad Boy. In 1942, Heber-Percy married Jennifer Ross, the only child of Sir Geoffrey Fry, 1st Baronet, and they had a daughter, Victoria, although the ménage à trois lasted only two years before Jennifer and their daughter moved to her parents' home, Oare House in Wiltshire.

Berners was notorious for his eccentricity, dyeing pigeons at Faringdon in vibrant colours and at one point entertaining Penelope Betjeman's horse Moti to tea. There were paper flowers in the garden and the interior of the house was adorned with joke books and joke notices, such as "Mangling Done Here".

Lord Berners died in 1950, and Heber-Percy inherited the house.

In 2014 it was owned by the writer Sofka Zinovieff, the granddaughter of Heber-Percy. In September 2017, it was listed for sale at a price of £11.5 million.
