= Geoffrey Fry =

Sir Geoffrey Storrs Fry, 1st Baronet, KCB, CVO (27 July 1888 – 1960) was private secretary to prime ministers Bonar Law and Stanley Baldwin, and a member of the Fry family.

== Early life ==
Geoffrey Storrs Fry was born on 27 July 1888. He was the younger son of Francis James Fry (1835–1918) and his second wife Elizabeth "Bessie" (née Pass) Fry. His father served as Sheriff of Bristol in 1887. Among his siblings was older sister, Norah (née Fry) Cooke-Hurle, an advocate of better services for people with learning difficulties.

His paternal grandfather was Joseph Storrs Fry and his first cousin, Joseph Storrs Fry II, later took over the family business. His uncle, Sir Theodore Fry, 1st Baronet, the husband of philanthropist Sophia Fry, was a Liberal Member of Parliament for Darlington.

== Career ==
He was called to the bar in 1913. He was a director of J. S. Fry & Sons, the British chocolate company.

Fry served as an unpaid private secretary to Bonar Law, Conservative M.P. from 1919 to 1921 and then while Law served as Prime Minister from 1922 to 1923. He then served as private secretary to Prime Minister Stanley Baldwin from 1923 until 1939. Fry was appointed a Companion of the Order of the Bath (CB) on 25 May 1923 (Bonar Law's resignation honours list). He was further honoured on 3 June 1929 by being appointed a Commander of the Royal Victorian Order (CVO).

On 29 July 1929, in the Dissolution Honours, the Fry Baronetcy of Oare in the County of Wiltshire was created in the Baronetage of the United Kingdom for him. Upon Baldwin's last act as Prime Minister in 1937, he requested and King George VI approved the appointment of a Knight Commander of the Order of the Bath (KCB). The King then elevated Baldwin to the peerage as Earl Baldwin of Bewdley.

== Personal life ==
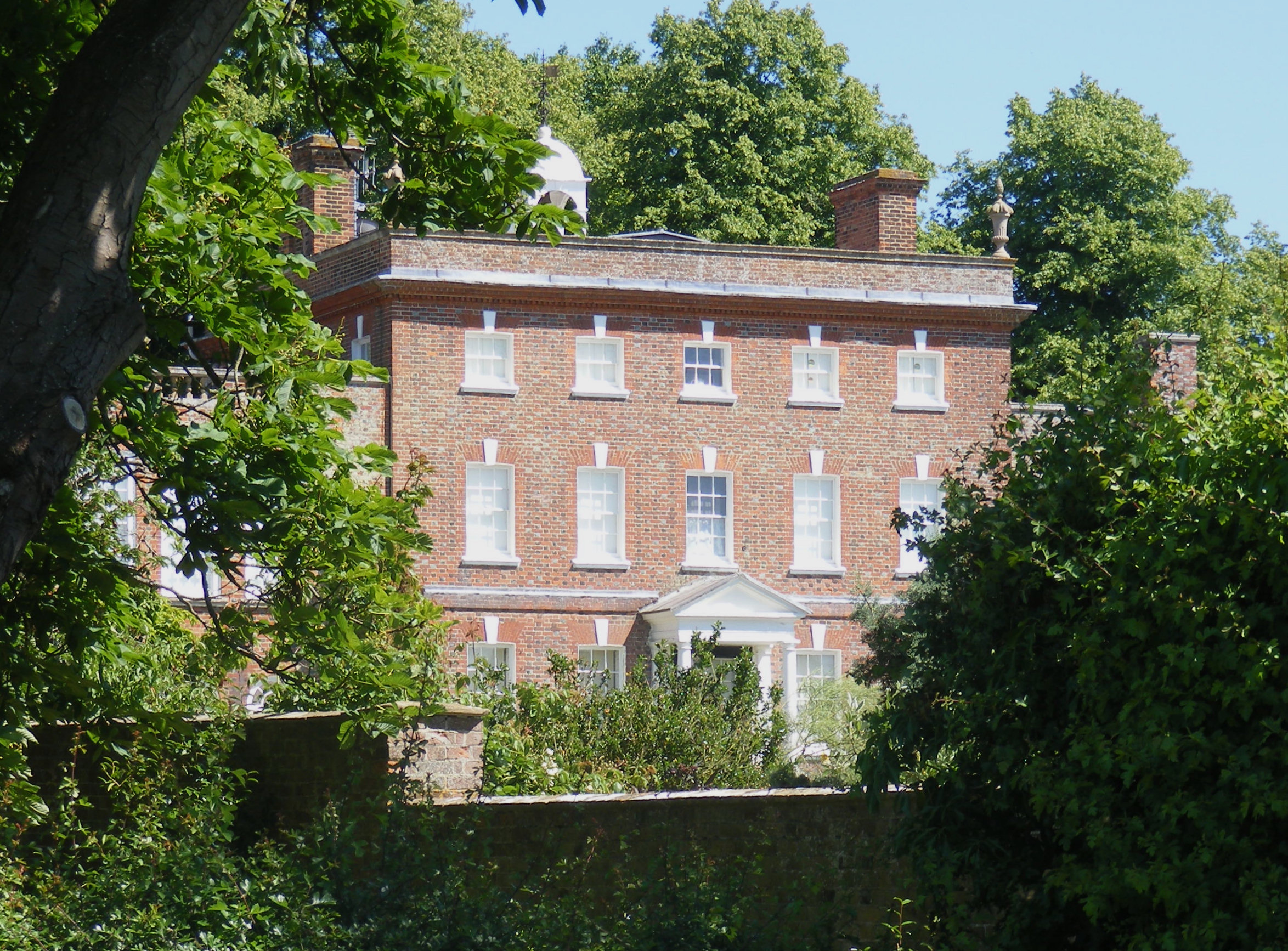
Oare House, 2010

On 30 June 1915, he married the Hon. Alathea Margaret Gwendolin Valentine Gardner (b. 1893), the second daughter of Lord Burghclere. Her paternal grandfather was Alan Gardner, 3rd Baron Gardner and her maternal grandfather was Henry Herbert, 4th Earl of Carnarvon. Alathea's younger sisters were Mary Gardner, who married Geoffrey Hope-Morley, 2nd Baron Hollenden, and Evelyn Gardner, who was the first wife of author Evelyn Waugh. Together, Sir Geoffrey and Alathea were the parents of one child:

- Ann Jennifer Evelyn Elizabeth Fry (1916–2003), who married Robert Heber-Percy in 1942. They were the parents of Victoria Gala Heber-Percy (wife of engineer and inventor Peter Zinovieff) before they divorced in 1947 and she then married the poet Alan Ross.

In 1921, he bought Oare House in Wiltshire, which was his home for the next forty years (and was later owned by Sir Henry Keswick). Fry hired architect Clough Williams-Ellis to remodel the 1740 home in the early 1920s. In the late 1920s Fry bought Sloane House on Old Church Street in Chelsea, London.

Sir Geoffrey died in 1960.

== Arms ==
Coat of arms of Geoffrey Fry

Crest
In front of a dexter arm embowed in armour the hand grasping a sword Proper pomel and hilt Or three roses Gules barbed and seeded Proper.
Escutcheon
Gules three horses courant in pale within a bordure Argent.
Motto
Esto Fidelis

Baronetage of the United Kingdom
New creation	Baronet (of Oare); 1929–1960	extinct
