= Peter Zinovieff =

British engineer and composer (1933–2021)

- Born: 26 January 1933; Fulham, London, England
- Died: 23 June 2021 (aged 88)
- Education: Guildford Royal Grammar School; Gordonstoun School
- Alma mater: Oxford University
- Occupations: Composer, musician, inventor
- Known for: Co-founder, EMS
- Spouses: Victoria Heber-Percy (m. 1960) Rose Verney (m. 1978): Tanya Richardson; Jenny Jardine
- Children: 7, including Sofka Zinovieff
- Parent(s): Leo Zinovieff; Sofka, née Princess Sophia Dolgorouky
- Relatives: Robert Heber-Percy (father-in-law)

Peter Zinovieff (26 January 1933 – 23 June 2021) was a British composer, musician and inventor. In the late 1960s, his company, Electronic Music Studios (EMS), made the VCS3, a synthesizer used by many early progressive rock bands such as Pink Floyd and White Noise, and Krautrock groups as well as more pop-orientated artists, including Todd Rundgren and David Bowie. In later life, he worked primarily as a composer of electronic music.

== Early life and education ==
Zinovieff was born on 26 January 1933; his parents, Leo Zinovieff and Sofka, née Princess Sophia Dolgorouky, were both Russian aristocrats, who met in London after their families had emigrated to escape the Russian Revolution and soon divorced. During World War II, he and his brother Ian lived with their grandparents in Guildford and then with their father in Sussex. He attended Guildford Royal Grammar School, Gordonstoun School and Oxford University, where he earned a doctorate in geology.

== Career in music and electronics ==
Zinovieff bought his first computer from the proceeds gained from auctioning his first wife's tiara. It raised £4,000 (equivalent to £80,000 in 2021). He used this computer to control an array of oscillators and amplifiers he had bought from an army surplus store. He claimed that "This was the first computer in the world in a private house".

Zinovieff's work followed research at Bell Labs by Max Mathews and Jean-Claude Risset, and an MIT thesis (1963) by David Alan Luce. In 1966–67, Zinovieff, Delia Derbyshire and Brian Hodgson ran Unit Delta Plus, an organisation to create and promote electronic music. It was based in the studio Zinovieff had built, in a shed at his house in Putney. (The house is near the Thames, and the studio was later partially destroyed by a flood). EMS grew out of MUSYS, which was a performance controller operating as an analogue–digital hybrid. It was a synthesiser system which Zinovieff developed with the help of David Cockerell and Peter Grogono, and used two DEC PDP-8 minicomputers and a piano keyboard. It was marketed as being more portable than the huge Moog system, and at one point Robert Moog offered to sell out to EMS for one million dollars. Zinovieff turned down this deal.

Unit Delta Plus ran a concert of electronic music at the Watermill Theatre in 1966, with a light show. In early 1967 they performed in concerts at The Roundhouse, at which the Carnival of Light was also played; they split up later in 1967. Paul McCartney had visited the studio, but Zinovieff had little interest in popular music.

In 1968, Zinovieff's computer music system featured in several pioneering events in London. In January, the First London concert of Electronic Music by British composers event was held at the Queen Elizabeth Hall. Alongside pieces by Delia Derbyshire and Tristram Cary, the concert included the premiere of Zinovieff's Partita for Unattended Computer, the first ever unaccompanied performance of live computer music, with no human performer involved, and the piece read from paper tape. The programmes were covered in foil so the audience could participate by rustling them. Later that year, as part of Cybernetic Serendipity, the first UK international exhibition devoted to the relationship between the arts and new technology at the Institute of Contemporary Arts, Zinovieff and his team created a computer system, based on the PDP-8, which could analyse a tune whistled by a visitor to the show and improvise upon it.

In the same year, part of the studio was also recreated at Connaught Hall, for a performance of pieces by Justin Connolly and David Lumsdaine. At the IFIP congress that year, the composition ZASP by Zinovieff with Alan Sutcliffe took second prize in a contest, behind a piece by Iannis Xenakis.

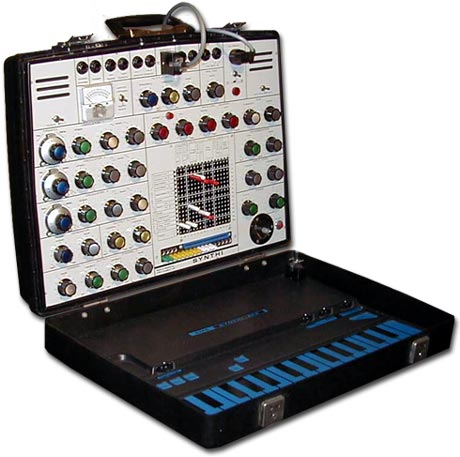
EMS Synthi AKS

In 1969, Zinovieff sought financing through an ad in The Times but received only one response, £50 on the mistaken premise it was the price of a synthesiser. Instead he formed EMS with Cockerell and Tristram Cary. At the end of the 1960s, EMS Ltd. was one of four companies offering commercial synthesizers, the others being ARP, Buchla, and Moog. In the 1970s Zinovieff became interested in the video synthesizer developed by Richard Monkhouse, and EMS produced it as the Spectron.

Jon Lord of Deep Purple described Zinovieff as "a mad professor type": "I was ushered into his workshop and he was in there talking to a computer, trying to get it to answer back". Trevor Pinch and Frank Trocco, in their history of the synthesizer revolution, see him rather as aristocratically averse to "trade". In a 2019 interview Zinovieff commented on EMS as a business: "It's always been a problem with me because I don't like synthesizers. So this side of EMS was never interesting to me, it was always the studio. The basic purpose of EMS was to finance the studio, but unfortunately that's not what happened. EMS got bigger and bigger and we made more and more products and it took up more time. And instead of making money, it started to lose it. In the end, when EMS went bankrupt, it pulled the studio down."

Throughout his career, Zinovieff often worked in collaboration.

Between 1969 and 1978 he collaborated with Harrison Birtwistle on a number of works. These include Chronometer (1971–2) which features recordings of the ticking of Big Ben and the chimes of Wells Cathedral clock. Chronometer was premiered at the Queen Elizabeth Hall on 24 April 1972 in a four-channel version. Zinovieff claimed that he invented sampling in his work on Chronometer. Two years later, Pink Floyd used a similar effect on their album, The Dark Side of the Moon.

The soundtrack for Sidney Lumet's film The Offence (1972) was composed by Birtwistle with 'electronic realization' by Zinovieff.

As well as working with sound, Zinovieff also wrote the libretto for Birtwistle's opera The Mask of Orpheus, and also the words for Nenia: The Death of Orpheus (1970).

He also worked with Hans Werner Henze, and the section Tristan's Folly in Tristan (1975) included a tape by Zinovieff.

After EMS ran into financial difficulties in the mid 1970s, Zinovieff closed his Putney studio, which was sold to the National Theatre, but never put back together as a working studio. His equipment was put into storage, and later destroyed in a flood.

He then moved to the remote Scottish island of Raasay, (also the home of Birtwistle between 1975 and 1983). His cottage had no mains electricity supply and he powered his remaining synth equipment from batteries hooked up to a windmill.

He subsequently moved back to England, settling in Cambridge, and in the 1980s received two commissions from Clive Sinclair including a piano-sampling project and consultations on sound support during the development of the Sinclair QL.

=== Activity as a composer (2010–2021) ===
After a break of many years, in 2010 Zinovieff became active again publicly in music composition.

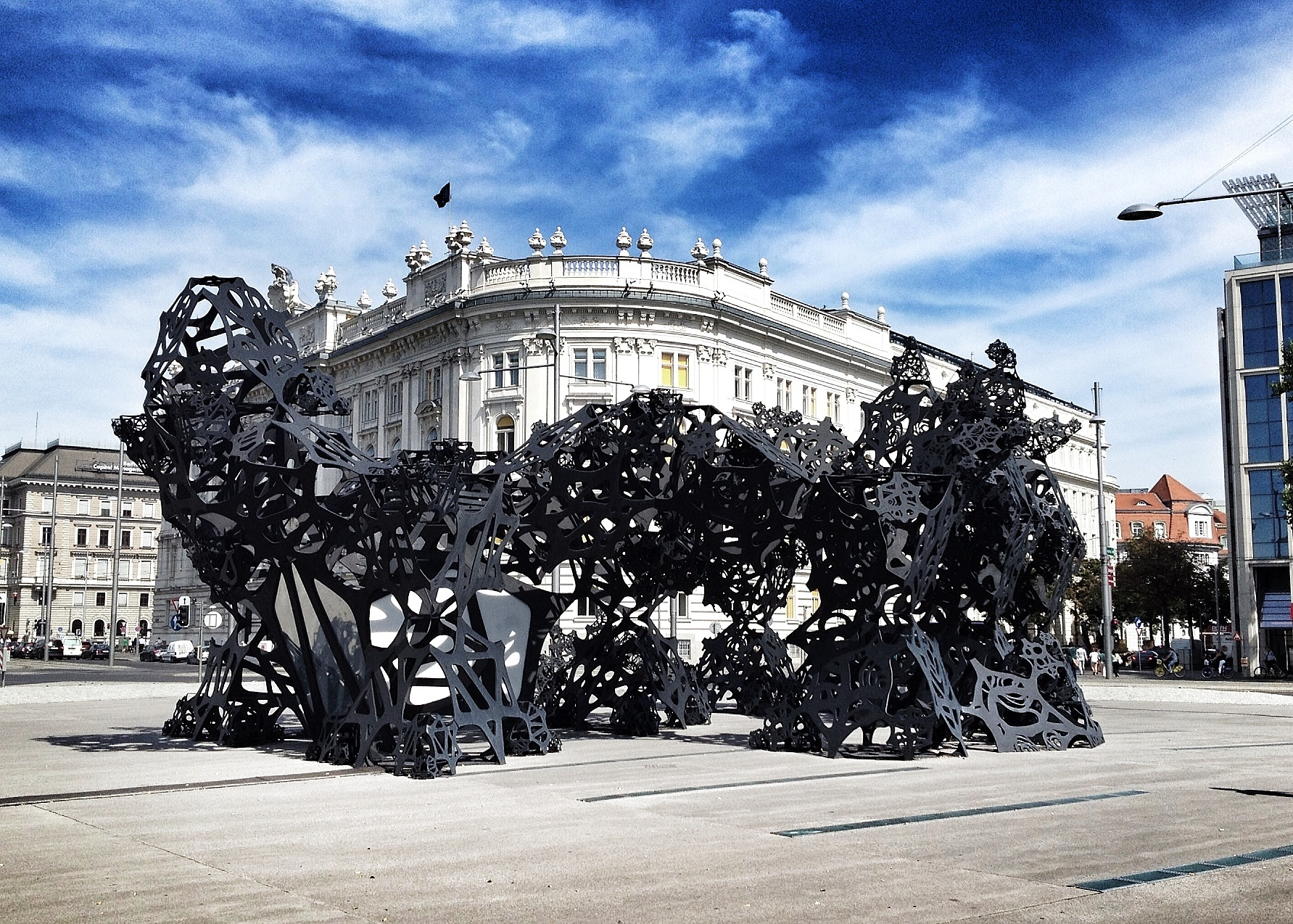
"The Morning Line" Matthew Ritchie (Vienna, 2012)

This started with a commission from TBA21, instigated by Russell Haswell, to create an audio work for the large-scale installation The Morning Line by artist Matthew Ritchie, which contains a 47-speaker spatial sound system. The result was Bridges from Somewhere and Another to Somewhere Else, shown during its exhibition in Istanbul. A second piece Good Morning Ludwig was commissioned in 2012 when the installation moved permanently to ZKM, Karlsruhe.

Following these projects, Zinovieff continued to work primarily as a composer for the remaining years of his life. His work during this time combined sounds from live instrumentation and field recordings and continued his long-term interest in computer music and spatial multi-channel performance setups. Embracing the power of modern computer technology allowed him to realise ways of working he had pursued throughout his career in music and electronics.

He also continued to work mainly in collaboration during this time. With violinist Aisha Orazbayeva, Zinovieff composed two concertos for violin and electronics: OUR (2010) and Our Too, premiered at London Contemporary Music Festival in 2014.

A series of works created from 2011 onwards in collaboration with poet Katrina Porteous combined her poetry with soundscapes created by Zinovieff using sound sources related to physics and astronomy. The first piece, Horse (2011), was broadcast on BBC Radio 3. Subsequent works with Porteous were commissioned by the Centre for Life, Newcastle upon Tyne for live performance in its planetarium. These pieces—Edge (2013), Field (2015), Sun (2016)—are surround-sound works with live visuals created by planetarium supervisor Christopher Hudson. A final work in the series, Under The Ice, a 30-minute piece based on recordings of Antarctic glaciers, premiered online on 23 June 2021.

Zinovieff's collaboration with cellist Lucy Railton, entitled RFG, was initially conceived as a live piece for a spatially configured loudspeaker system and performed between 2016 and 2017. An album version was released as RFG Inventions for Cello and Computer on PAN in 2020.

A retrospective compilation covering Zinovieff's work in the EMS era, including collaborations with Hans Werner Henze and Harrison Birtwistle, was compiled by musician Pete Kember and released in 2015.

Between the years 2013–2017, Zinovieff composed an extended computer work, entitled South Pacific Migration Party, derived from hydrophone recordings of blue whales recorded by British oceanographer Susannah Buchan off the coast of Chile and originally proposed and then curated by Andrew Spyrou. As its premiere, a preliminary quadraphonic mix of the piece was played in Athens as part of documenta 14 in June 2017, followed by a presentation of the piece during the UN Ocean Conference, at The Explorers Club, New York City, the same month. Subsequently, a full b-format rendering of the piece was commissioned by TBA21, and presented at the TBA21-Augarten ambisonic sound space in Vienna, during the exhibition Tidalectics. An 8-track reduction, designed for two separate quadraphonic systems, was presented at the Hamburger Bahnhof Museum, Berlin, in October 2017. The piece was released on the record label The Association for Depth Sound Recordings on 30 July 2021.

== Awards ==
In 2015 Zinovieff was awarded an honorary Doctor of Music degree by Anglia Ruskin University.

== Personal life ==
In 1960, Zinovieff married Victoria Heber-Percy, daughter of Robert Heber-Percy and Jennifer Ross; in 1978, he married Rose Verney. He later married Tanya Richardson, and was survived by his fourth wife, Jenny Jardine. He had seven children, including Sofka.

Zinovieff died on the night of 23 June 2021. He was 88, and had been hospitalised ten days earlier after falling at his home.

== Selected discography ==
=== Solo and collaborative works ===
with Harrison Birtwistle

- 1975 Chronometer (Argo)

with Harrison Birtwistle, Hans Werner Henze and others

- 2015 Electronic Calendar – The EMS Tapes (Space Age Recordings)

with Aisha Orazbayeva

- 2011 5 Bagatelles From OUR Violin And Computer Concerto (on Aisha Orazbayeva Outside LP on Nonclassical)

with Lucy Railton

- 2020 RFG Inventions for Cello and Computer (PAN)

Solo

- 2021 South Pacific Migration Party (The Association for Depth Sound Recordings)

=== Compilation appearances ===
- 1968 Cybernetic Serendipity Music (ICA)
- 2008 Recovery/Discovery 40 years of surround electronic music in the UK (Sound And Music)
