= Robert Heber-Percy =

English eccentric (1911–1987)

- Born: 5 November 1911; Shifnal, Shropshire, England
- Died: 29 October 1987 (aged 75)
- Education: Stowe School
- Occupation: Eccentric
- Spouse(s): Jennifer Fry (m. 1942) Lady Dorothy Lygon (m. 1985)
- Children: 1
- Relatives: Sir Geoffrey Fry, 1st Baronet (father-in-law); William Lygon, 7th Earl Beauchamp (father-in-law); Peter Zinovieff (son-in-law); Sofka Zinovieff (granddaughter)

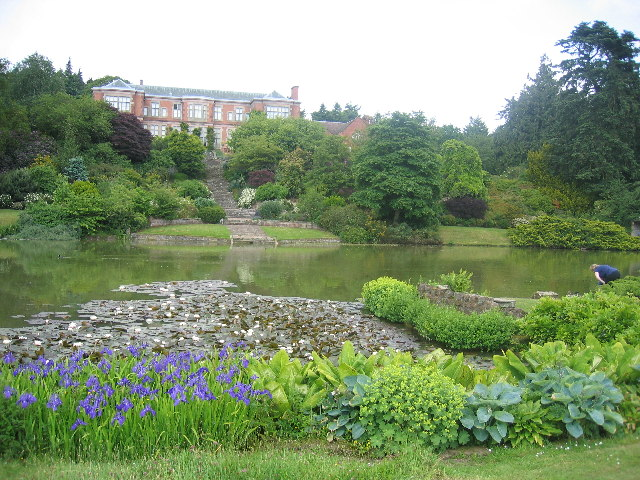
Hodnet Hall (Heber-Percy's childhood home) from the lake, 2005

Robert Vernon Heber-Percy (5 November 1911 – 29 October 1987), known for much of his life as "the Mad Boy", was "an English eccentric in the grand tradition".

== Early life ==
Heber-Percy was born in 1911, the fourth and youngest son of Algernon Hugh Heber-Percy (1869–1941), JP, of Hodnet Hall, Shropshire, and Gladys May (d. 1956), MBE, daughter of William Edward Montagu Hulton-Harrop, JP, DL, of Lythwood Hall, near Shrewsbury, Shropshire, and of Bardsley, Lancashire. Algernon Heber-Percy was a lieutenant in the Shropshire Yeomanry, and served as aide-de-camp to the Governor of Queensland, private secretary to the Lieutenant-Governor of British New Guinea, and was Hereditary Seneschal of Montgomery Castle. He was a descendant of Algernon Percy, 1st Earl of Beverley, of the family of the Dukes of Northumberland.

He was raised at Hodnet Hall, and brought up in country pursuits alongside his brothers, at which he excelled, particularly in riding, on the hunting field, and in breaking-in young horses; his brother Cyril wrote of him that "he was full of fun, up to every prank, could hoodwink most people, and developed a gift for repartee". He was educated at Stowe School, and commissioned (reaching the rank of lieutenant) into the King's Dragoon Guards in a "brief but hectic" career.

== Career ==
Early work included acting as a Hollywood extra, serving in a Lyons' Corner House, which ended after he spilled soup on a customer and helping to run a nightclub.

Heber-Percy's main occupation was running the Faringdon House estate in Oxfordshire, owned by Lord Berners. Although he maintained a lively social life, with close friends including William Plomer, John and Penelope Betjeman, and Raymond Mortimer, Heber-Percy was dedicated to maintaining the estate, and woke up early to work in the fields alongside estate workers. He refused to increase rent for tenants of several decades' standing. Heber-Percy constructed follies and built "a swimming pool reached by high steps and overlooked by giant gryphons", with a changing room the floor of which "was inlaid with pennies".

As a sideline, he and a carpenter friend went into business as undertakers; he was particularly fond of the company's annual conferences, as they "invariably provided him with a fund of good stories".

During the Second World War, he was sent as a Secret Service emissary to the Balkans and Arabia.

== Personal life ==
Heber-Percy was the companion and lover of the composer Lord Berners until his death in 1950, when he inherited Faringdon House. Berners built a tower there commemorating Heber-Percy's 21st birthday; the latter subsequently admitted he would rather have been given a horse.

In 1942, he married an already pregnant Jennifer Fry, only child of Geoffrey Fry. They had a daughter, Victoria, born in 1943. The marriage was dissolved in 1947. All four of them lived together in Faringdon House, and were photographed by Cecil Beaton in September 1943. The ménage à trois lasted two years before Jennifer and her daughter moved to her parents' home, Oare House, in Wiltshire. Victoria Gala Heber-Percy married the composer and musical inventor Peter Zinovieff, and they had three children, the eldest being the writer Sofka Zinovieff, who inherited the entirety of her grandfather's estate, including Faringdon House. In 2014 Sofka Zinovieff wrote a memoir about Heber-Percy, Jennifer Fry and Lord Berners at Faringdon.

== Death ==
In 1985, he married Dorothy Lygon, the fourth daughter of William Lygon, 7th Earl Beauchamp, whom he had known for over fifty years; this relationship "cheered his later years, when he was lame from a stroke and several brushes with death" but they "parted amicably" a year later. His ashes were scattered around the lake at Faringdon House.
