= Patrick Eagar =

British cricket photographer

- Born: 1944 (age 81–82)
- Occupation: Cricket photographer
- Years active: 1965–2011
- Father: Desmond Eagar

Patrick Eagar (born 1944) is a British cricket photographer, who took photos at 325 Test matches, including 98 Ashes Test matches, between 1965 and 2011.

== Early life ==
Patrick Eagar is the son of former Hampshire cricket captain Desmond Eagar. Eagar's first camera was given to him by his grandmother when he was 8 or 9 years old. Eagar studied at Magdalene College, Cambridge, where he studied modern sciences, before switching to anthropology. During his time at Cambridge, Eagar worked for Varsity newspaper and Image. In 1966, Eagar worked for five months taking photos at a children's hospital in Saigon. Eagar particularly liked the photography in Sports Illustrated.

== Career ==
During the 1963 West Indies series in England, Eagar took a photograph of Wes Hall breaking Colin Cowdrey's arm in the Lord's Test match. This was in spite of the fact that the ground did not permit photography. The first Test match where Eagar was an official photographer was the 1965 match at Headingley between England and New Zealand; John Edrich scored a triple century in the match.

After a rise in freelance photographers, Eagar began to cover matches on a more frequent basis, beginning with the 1972 Ashes series in England. In the 1972 Headingley Ashes Test, Eagar had just one over to take a photograph for The Sunday Times to use for the next day's newspaper. During the 1970s, he produced photographs for the Wisden Cricket Monthly and The Cricketer magazines. His best-known photos include Rod Marsh's catch to dismiss Tony Greig in a 1975 Cricket World Cup match at Headingley, England captain Michael Vaughan holding The Ashes urn after England won the 2005 Ashes, and Andrew Strauss' catch in the same series. In interview, Eagar said that his favourite photo was of Gordon Greenidge playing cricket on the beach in Bridgetown, Barbados in 1973, and that his favourite player to photograph was Kim Hughes, due to his improvisation at the crease.

In 2005, Eagar held an exhibit of his Test match cricket photography at Lord's. The 300th Test match where Eagar took photos was at Lord's in 2007, and the 2010 Ashes match in Perth was his 100th England-Australia Test match. (Note: Total includes the Centenary Tests, and other one-off England-Australia matches that were not part of The Ashes.)

In early 2011, Eagar announced that he was retiring. He had covered 325 Test matches, including 98 Ashes Tests. He had produced over half a million images. In a post-retirement interview, Eagar reckoned that Richie Benaud and John Woodcock had seen more Test matches than him. Also in 2011, Eagar was awarded the Doug Gardner Award at the British Sports Journalism Awards.

== Works ==
- Eagar, Patrick, Arlott, John, An Eye for Cricket, 1980, Hodder & Stoughton, ISBN 9780340243923
- Eagar, Patrick, Ross, Alan, A Summer to Remember (England v Australia 1981), 1981, Collins, ISBN 0002163888
- Eagar, Patrick, Wright, Graham, Test Decade 1972–82, 1982, ISBN 043704050X
