= Lord Berners =

British composer and eccentric (1883-1950)

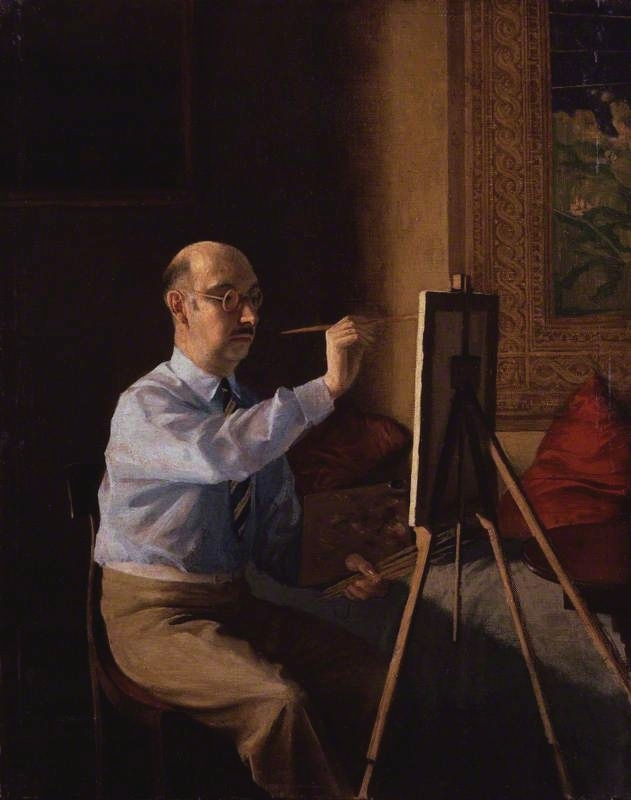
Portrait of Berners, by Rex Whistler, 1929

Lord Berners – Gerald Hugh Tyrwhitt-Wilson, 14th Baron Berners (18 September 1883 – 19 April 1950) – was a British composer, novelist, painter and aesthete. Before inheriting the peerage in 1918 he was known as Gerald Tyrwhitt.

The only child of an upper-class English couple, Berners was educated at Eton College and was destined for the diplomatic corps. Failing the Foreign Office entrance examinations he accepted an unpaid post as honorary attaché to the British embassy in Constantinople. Music was his principal pleasure and after he was posted to Rome in 1911 he began to compose. In Rome he met Igor Stravinsky, who became a firm friend and regarded Berners as the best British composer of his generation.

Berners inherited the barony from a bachelor uncle in 1918 and left the foreign service. He wrote fiction and autobiography and took up painting, but it was as a composer that he became best known. He wrote only one opera, but was happier with ballet music, working with Sergei Diaghilev, Frederick Ashton, Constant Lambert and others. Later in his career he composed film music for Ealing Studios.

For his most of his first five decades, Berners had no life partner, but in 1932 he met the 21-year-old Robert Heber-Percy with whom he formed a relationship that lasted for the rest of Berners's life. Berners was well known for his eccentricities, such as having the pigeons in his country park dyed in bright colours, and commissioning the last folly built in England. Something of this eccentricity is evident from time to time in his music, but his paintings, influenced by Corot, were done with great seriousness.

== Life and career ==
=== Early years ===
Berners was born on 18 September 1883 in Apley Hall, Stockton, Shropshire as Gerald Hugh Tyrwhitt, (Note: The surname became Tyrwhitt-Wilson by royal licence in 1919, after he had acceded to the Berners barony and baronetcy.) the only child of the Honourable Hugh Tyrwhitt and his wife Julia Mary, daughter of Apley's owner. Julia Tyrwhitt's father, William Orme Foster, was a rich ironmaster and rural MP, and although she had undiscriminating aesthetic pretentions, she was more interested in hunting than in culture. (Note: Berners later wrote: "She admired indiscriminately Keats and Longfellow, Jane Austen and Marie Corelli. Paintings by Leader and Luke Fildes gave her the same emotions as those by Raphael and Titian.) His friend and biographer John Betjeman comments that Berners did not take willingly to the sporting country life for which his parents and grandmother intended him, although he retained a knowledge of animal life, particularly birds and plants.

Berners later wrote, "My father was worldly, cynical, intolerant of any kind of inferiority, reserved and self-possessed. My mother was unworldly, naïve, impulsive and undecided, and in my father's presence she was always at her worst". Tyrwhitt senior was an officer in the Royal Navy and his son recalled that the two saw little of each other as his father "was nearly always away at sea".

In about 1890 the Tyrwhitts moved to Althrey in north-east Wales. The local curate became Gerald's private tutor for some two years, before the boy was sent to Cheam boarding school. Berners renames it "Elmley" in his autobiography, First Childhood, giving what his biographer Peter Dickinson calls a merciless description. Like countless other boys sent to British preparatory schools, Tyrwhitt was miserable. His biographer Mark Amory writes, "The food was foul, the beating and the bullying were savage, and the threat of them made him walk in constant fear; he was hopeless at games, at best bored, often humiliated".

In 1897 Berners passed the Eton entrance examination and entered the school aged thirteen. He was less unhappy there than at Cheam but he was not a distinguished scholar and later commented that Eton had not merely taught him nothing, but had set him back several years by blunting a natural enthusiasm for learning. Betjeman wrote, "Berners's chief delight in life was music, and the second volume of his autobiography movingly describes how at Eton his appreciation developed and his mind opened to pleasure in the arts generally".

=== After Eton ===
Tyrwhitt finished at Eton in 1900, and the question arose, what was he to do as an adult? He later wrote:

I was given to understand that it would be necessary for me to earn my living. I was surrounded by people who seemed to have nothing to do but amuse themselves, and I thought it grossly unfair. Why couldn't my grandfather, who was immensely rich, provide me with sufficient money to enable me to live in luxurious ease like my uncles and aunts? What was the point in becoming a grown-up gentleman if one had to be bothered with a profession?

The family decided that he should pursue a career in the diplomatic service. They sent him to Normandy to learn French and then to Dresden to learn German. The latter stay fed his musical appetite: he saw Fidelio and Carmen, heard Richard Strauss's music and took orchestration lessons with Edmund Kretschmer. In 1904 he made his first visit to Italy, staying in Florence and Sorrento. He spent the next seven years travelling through Europe, usually staying in one place for no longer than three or four months. He attended concerts and opera houses, hearing, among other works, The Magic Flute, Salome and Lohengrin, as well as concert works by Debussy.

He studied with various teachers for the Foreign Office entrance examinations, but failed them and was then obliged to tell his mother in 1905 that he did not feel ready to resit them. The following year, his father, whose naval career had been prospering, was taken ill and had to go into a nursing home. In 1907 Tyrwhitt again failed his Foreign Office examinations, and shortly after that his father died suddenly at sea, en route from Marseille to Port Said to convalesce.

A year after Hugh Tyrwitt's death, his widow remarried. Her second husband was Colonel William Ward Bennitt. She was happy in this second marriage, and although Berners never warmed to his stepfather he conscientiously visited the couple at their country home when he was in England.

=== Diplomatic corps ===
In 1909, despite having failed the Foreign Office examinations, Tyrwhitt was sent to the British embassy in Vienna to learn how the diplomatic corps operated. He was subsequently appointed honorary unpaid attaché to the British embassy in Constantinople. The Ottoman Empire was in steep decline and Tyrwhitt witnessed the rising that deposed the Sultan of Constantinople. He wrote:

It was all very exciting. We were awoken at five o'clock in the morning by a violent fusillade which continued till eleven o'clock. The invading army from Salonika had at last entered the capital and the mutinous troops in the Taxim barracks set up a valiant resistance. All the embassy collected on the roof in pyjamas and all kinds of queer costumes.

Tyrwhitt was the first Christian to enter the Old Seraglio of the dethroned sultan: "It is a real Arabian Nights palace with tiled courtyards, roof gardens, marble baths and fountains, dark murderous-looking corridors with latticed windows, secret stairways and so forth". On another occasion he emulated Lord Byron by swimming the Hellespont.

In 1910 he was summoned back to Vienna to help with the scenery and music for some tableaux vivants, after which he visited his mother in England, before returning to Constantinople via Paris. The following year he was sent to Rome as honorary attaché to the British embassy there. Igor Stravinsky was resident in the city at that time, and Tyrwhitt immediately introduced himself. They became firm friends, and Stravinsky later said that Tyrwhitt (by then Lord Berners) was the best British composer of his generation.

Tyrwhitt remained based principally in Rome for most of the next seven years. In 1913 he began work on his first mature compositions, Lieder Album – Three songs in the German Manner, settings of poems by Heinrich Heine. He followed these with the solo piano piece Le poisson d'or (1915), which he dedicated to Stravinsky. After studying in Paris for a while he returned to Rome and in 1916 completed another piano work, Trois petites marches funèbres. (Note: The three marches mourn, respectively, a statesman commemorated with comic pomposity, a canary, and a rich aunt whose departure is a cause for joy; the only one of the three deaths that causes sincere sadness is the canary's.) Alfredo Casella premiered the piece at the Academia di Santa Cecilia the following year – the first professional performance of any of Berners's music. Dickinson comments that the last of the three marches, Pour une tante à heritage, gained notoriety "firstly for the dissonant style of its gleeful celebration and secondly from the fact that Berners inherited his titles and wealth just 18 months later".

In August 1917, Lady Berners, Gerald's paternal grandmother, died at Ashwellthorpe, Norwich, aged 81. The title, unusually, was heritable through the female line and passed to her son, Sir Raymond Robert Tyrwhitt-Wilson, who became the 13th baron. As he was unmarried, Gerald Tyrwitt was heir presumptive. In the same year the London musical publishers J & W Chester Ltd published his Trois petites marches funèbres.

=== Peerage ===
In September 1918 Tyrwhitt's uncle, the 13th Baron Berners, died aged 63, after holding the barony for barely a year. (Note: He had inherited the baronetcy on the death of his father in 1894.) He had never married and the baronetcy and barony both devolved upon Gerald Tyrwhitt, who inherited the extensive property and money entailed with the barony. He sold much of the estate, and bought Faringdon House, in Faringdon, Berkshire, which he put at the disposal of his mother and stepfather. After their deaths in 1931 he moved into the house himself.

1919 was a busy year for Berners. He saw in the new year with Diaghilev in London; Chester published Le poisson d'or; Berners attended the premiere of Three Pieces for Orchestra in Manchester, conducted by Eugene Goossens; he left his job with the embassy in Rome; and changed his surname by royal licence to comply with the family convention that Barons Berners should have the double-barrelled name. Established in England, Berners embraced what Amory calls "the agreeable area of social life where the upper classes met the musicians, writers, and artists of all kinds". Among his new and recently made friends were Sibyl Colefax, Emerald Cunard, and Nancy and Diana Mitford among the women, and Cecil Beaton, Ronald Firbank, Constant Lambert, Harold Nicolson, Siegfried Sassoon, Osbert and Sacheverell Sitwell, and Rex Whistler among the men.

In June of 1919 Ernest Ansermet conducted the Three Pieces for Orchestra in Paris; they were reprised in London shortly afterwards. Sir Henry Wood conducted the premiere of Berners's Fantasie espagnole at the Proms the following September. Reviewing the performance, Ernest Newman commented:

Some of the Fantasia espagnole is frankly a flinging of a pot of paint at our heads, but the mess is quite a picturesque and pleasant one. One sees at once the school in which the composer learned his technique; but he does not disgrace his masters.

=== 1920s ===
"Lord Berners making more sweetness than violence" – caricature by Max Beerbohm, 1923

At the beginning of the 1920s, Chester and Co published three sets of pieces by Berners: Lieder Album, Three English Songs, and Trois Chansons. The musical establishment was beginning to take note of him. In January 1920 The Musical Times published a five-page study of his works by the musicologist and critic Edwin Evans, who wrote:

As a composer, Lord Berners stands entirely alone. He not only represents a very special feature in our musical life, but he combines it with a paradox. He has a sense of humour which corresponds to a national trait, but the manner of it is international. It is English fun with pungency.

Evans instanced Berners's setting of Heine's Du bist wie eine Blume (You are Like a Flower) a verse that Robert Schumann and others set as a love song, but was according to Berners addressed to a fat white pig: "[Berners] has accordingly deemed it a pious duty to restore the poet's original meaning, whilst preserving the sentimental character of the German lied".

In 1921 the Fantasia espagnole was again given at the Queen's Hall, opening a concert conducted by Goossens that continued with John Ireland's The Forgotten Rite, Ravel's La Valse and concluded with the first British performance of Stravinsky's The Rite of Spring. (Note: Reviewing the concert in The Musical Times, Alfred Kalisch distinguished himself by asserting, "it can be predicted with some safety that the Forgotten Rite will be remembered when the Rite of Spring has been forgotten". His one-word judgement of Berners's piece was "pleasing".) The Valses bourgeoises were performed in Salzburg at the second International Society for Contemporary Music Festival, in 1923. The only other British contributions were William Walton's String Quartet and Arthur Bliss's Rhapsody. Alban Berg was impressed enough to take Berners and Walton to meet Arnold Schoenberg, founder of the Second Viennese School.

In 1924 Berners's only opera, Le Carrosse du Saint sacrement, a one-act comedy based on a play by Prosper Mérimée, was given successfully in Paris. According to Dickinson, it made "much use of arioso and accompanied recitative, melodic flights being mainly reserved for the orchestra". Berners was one of only two English composers commissioned by Diaghilev – the other was Lambert – and in 1926 the resulting ballet, The Triumph of Neptune – scenario by Sacheverell Sitwell and choreography by Georges Balanchine, was a considerable success. The reviewer in The Times wrote, "it is a little dangerous to speak of beauty when a composer so obviously has his tongue in his cheek, but we fancy that he became serious for a moment when writing the music for the snow-fairies. He begins by gently poking fun at Tchaikovsky's ballet music, but ends by writing a lovely tune, which is thoroughly English".

In the late 1920s Berners bought townhouses in Rome (overlooking the Forum) and London (off Belgrave Square). He took to painting in addition to composition and, particularly when staying at his Roman address, he worked in a style reminiscent of Corot, painting serious and serene landscapes. His fortunes were damaged by the Wall Street Crash in 1929, but his losses were less severe than he made out.

=== 1930s ===
In 1930 Berners wrote a short ballet, Luna Park, with the sub-title of "The Freaks", first given in Charles B. Cochran's 1930 Revue, featuring Serge Lifar and a group of Russian dancers, portraying showman and a freak show. The Era called it "a good idea, perfectly executed" and praised Berners's "brilliantly modern music". He rescored the music for concert performance; the premiere was given at the Proms under Wood in September 1931.

In 1932, while visiting Sir Michael Duff and his wife at their estate in north Wales, Berners met Robert Heber-Percy, 28 years his junior. They began a relationship that lasted for the rest of Berners's life. Heber-Percy, widely known as "the Mad Boy" or sometimes "Madders", was a larger-than-life extrovert from an otherwise conventional upper-class family. When asked how the Heber-Percys felt about the young man being taken up by a middle-aged homosexual, a friend replied, "Relieved, I expect". Heber-Percy moved into Faringdon House and managed Berners's estate.

Other events of importance to Berners's life in 1932 included the premiere of the ballet Foyer de danse at the Mercury Theatre, London. This one-act ballet choreographed by Frederick Ashton reused Berners's music from Luna Park. It had a wholly new scenario devised by Ashton, who co-starred in it with Alicia Markova. In the same year, Berners and Salvador Dali met at the Princesse de Polignac's house in Paris.

The folly at Faringdon

During 1934 Berners's first prose work was published: a volume of memoirs, First Childhood, which he had been working on since 1931. It was well received: The Times called Berners "a writer with an insidious ironic humour which soon has the reader at his mercy"; other reviewers also praised it: "the most amusing book of memories I have come across for a very long time"; "Lord Berners can tell a droll story with the gusto of a Balzac and with the grace of an Anatole France. He is an artist in delicate prose … This witty book is an artistic laughter-cure"; "Sharp and sweet, wicked yet wise". The novelist Hugh Walpole wrote, "Lord Berners in this book shows that he is a poet who has never grown up, not because he cannot, but because he does not want to. The only people who write well about their childhood are those who have never left it".

At Faringdon in the mid-1930s Berners built the last traditional folly in England. The octagonal tower is over a hundred feet tall. At the entrance Berners had a notice posted: "Members of the Public committing suicide from this tower do so at their own risk". His quirks and eccentricities were well known among his circle. He regularly had the pigeons on his estate dyed in bright colours. The interior of the house was enlivened with joke books and notices, such as "Mangling Done Here". Patrick Leigh Fermor, who stayed as a guest, recalled:

"No dogs admitted" at the top of the stairs and "Prepare to meet thy God" painted inside a wardrobe. When people complimented him on his delicious peaches he would say "Yes, they are ham-fed". And he used to put Woolworth pearl necklaces round his dogs' necks ... and when a guest, rather perturbed, ran up saying "Fido has lost his necklace", G said, "Oh dear, I'll have to get another out of the safe."

Berners's Rolls-Royce motor car contained a small clavichord or spinet which could be stored beneath the front seat. He appears in fictional form in books of the period, portrayed as Lord Merlin in Nancy Mitford's The Pursuit of Love, and as Robert Mainwroth in Osbert Sitwell's The LoveBird.

In 1936 Berners published a novel, The Camel, in which the main character, Antonia Hussey, is a vicar's wife – based on Penelope Betjeman. A camel mysteriously arrives at the vicarage ("Nonsense!" exclaimed the vicar, "How could it be a camel at this hour of the morning!") and Antonia takes to riding it to hounds. In the same year Berners's third ballet, A Wedding Bouquet, was premiered at Sadler's Wells Theatre. Composer, librettist (Gertrude Stein) and choreographer (Ashton) were all at the first night. In addition to writing the music, Berners designed the sets and costumes. It is the only one of his ballets to have entered the repertoire, and was revived at the Royal Opera House in every decade from the 1940s to the 1980s and again in 2004, starring among numerous other dancers, Robert Helpmann, Margot Fonteyn, Monica Mason, Alexander Grant and Anthony Dowell.

Of Berners's fictional works, The Girls of Radcliff Hall (1937) is, in Amory's view, his most eccentric, taking as its starting point the celebrated lesbian novel The Well of Loneliness by Radclyffe Hall and imitating a girls' school story, with each of the girls based on a gay male friend of Berners (Cecil Beaton, David Herbert, Oliver Messel and Heber-Percy) with Berners himself as the headmistress. Because of its risqué nature Berners had it published privately.

He was a friend of the Mitford family and close to Diana Guinness, although Berners did not share her right-wing politics. He was apolitical and was deeply dismayed by the outbreak of the Second World War. He had a nervous breakdown and for a period he lived in lodgings in Oxford where his friend Maurice Bowra secured him a job cataloguing books. Heber-Percy was not on hand to look after him, being in the Middle East doing intelligence work.

=== Last years ===
In the 1940s Berners returned once more to writing prose. In 1941 two novels, Far from the Madding War and Count Omega, were followed by two short novels, Percy Wallingford and Mr Pidger published together in a single volume, and a further novel, The Romance of a Nose, followed in 1942. In the same year Berners's stage play The Furies was produced at the Oxford Playhouse. It was well received but did not transfer to the West End as its author had hoped. Also in 1942 Heber-Percy unexpectedly married. His bride, Jennifer Fry. was pregnant at the time of the wedding and their daughter was born in February 1943. Fry moved in at Faringdon, and Berners and she got on well. Heber-Percy, though, was unsuited to matrimony and the couple divorced in 1948. She moved out and remarried, but after his death the house was left to his granddaughter, Sofka Zinovieff.

Berners turned to film music, composing a complete score for the Ealing Studios film The Halfway House, contributing two numbers for the Ealing film Champagne Charlie and a complete score for the Ealing production Nicholas Nickleby (all 1944).

Following the production of his last ballet Les Sirènes (1946) Berners lost his eyesight. He died in 1950 aged 66 at Faringdon House, bequeathing his estate to Heber-Percy, who lived there until his own death in 1987. Berners's ashes are buried in the lawn near the house, and Heber-Percy's were scattered nearby 37 years later.

Berners wrote his own epitaph, which appears on his gravestone:

Here lies Lord Berners
One of the learners
His great love of learning
May earn him a burning
But, Praise the Lord!
He seldom was bored

== Music ==
From Berners's Trois petites marches funèbres

Berners's early music, written during his period at the British embassy in Rome during the First World War, was avant-garde in style. These are mostly songs (in English, French and German) and piano pieces, many written using his original name, Gerald Tyrwhitt. Later pieces were composed in a more accessible style, such as the Trois morceaux, Fantaisie espagnole (1919), Fugue in C minor (1924), and several ballets. His final three ballets, A Wedding Bouquet, Cupid and Psyche and Les Sirènes, were all written in collaboration with his friends Frederick Ashton (as choreographer) and Constant Lambert (as music director).

A triptych, the Fragments psychologiques, shows Berners's consciousness of the Second Viennese School. Béla Bartók was so impressed that he copied them out. L'uomo dai baffi, a futurist marionette show given in Rome in April 1918, used chamber orchestra versions of the second of the Fragments psychologiques and all three of his Trois petites marches funèbres. He wrote an orchestral piece, Portsmouth Point, inspired by the Thomas Rowlandson etching and predating by several years William Walton's much better known version.

Berners himself once said that he would have been a better composer if he had accepted fewer lunch invitations. However, the English composer Gavin Bryars, quoted in Dickinson's biography of Berners, disagrees saying, "If he had spent more time on his music he could have become a duller composer". Dinah Birch, reviewing The Mad Boy, Lord Berners, My Grandmother and Me, a biography of Berners written by Heber Percy's granddaughter, Sofka Zinovieff, concurs. saying: "Had he committed himself to composition as his life's work, perhaps his legacy would have been more substantial. But his music might have been less innovative, for its amateur quality – 'amateur in the best sense', as Stravinsky insisted – is inseparable from its distinctive flair".

== Books by Berners ==
Berners's coat of arms

=== Fiction ===
- 1936 – The Camel
- 1937 – The Girls of Radcliff Hall
- 1941 – Far From the Madding War
- 1941 – Count Omega
- 1941 – Percy Wallingford and Mr. Pidger
- 1941 – The Romance of a Nose

[See Collected Tales and Fantasies, New York, 1999]

=== Non-fiction ===
- 1934 – First Childhood
- 1945 – A Distant Prospect
- 2000 - The Chateau de Resenlieu
- 2008 - Dresden

== See also ==
- Lord Berners profiled in Loved Ones, a book of pen portraits by a close friend, Diana Mitford.

== Notes, references and sources ==
=== Sources ===
- Acton, Harold (1975). Nancy Mitford: A Memoir. New York: Harper & Row. ISBN 0-06-010018-4.
- Amory, Mark (1999). Lord Berners: The Last Eccentric. London: Pimlico. ISBN 978-0712665780.
- Berners, Gerald (1934). First Childhood. Suffolk: Richard Clay. OCLC 1179436352.
- Berners, Gerald (1999). Collected Tales and Fantasies of Lord Berners. New York: Turtle Point Press. OCLC 1357504627.
- Dickinson, Peter (2008). Lord Berners: Composer, Writer, Painter. Woodbridge: Boydell Press. ISBN 978-1843833925.
- Jones, Bryony (2003). The Music of Lord Berners (1883–1950): The Versatile Peer. Farnham: Ashgate. ISBN 978-0754608523.
- Leigh Fermor, Patrick (2016). Patrick Leigh Fermor: A Life in Letters. New York: New York Review Books. OCLC 1392314915.
- Pearson, John (1979). The Sitwells: A Family's Biography. New York: Harcourt Brace. OCLC 1036869657.
- Pevsner, Nikolaus (1966). Berkshire. The Buildings of England. Harmondsworth: Penguin. OCLC 1869761.
- Zinovieff, Sofka (2014). The Mad Boy, Lord Berners, My Grandmother And Me. Jonathan Cape. ISBN 978-0224096591.

Peerage of England
Preceded by Raymond Robert Tyrwhitt-Wilson	Baron Berners; 1918–1950	Succeeded by Vera Ruby Williams
Baronetage of the United Kingdom
Preceded by Raymond Robert Tyrwhitt-Wilson	Baronet (of Stanley Hall); 1918–1950	Extinct
