= Oare House =

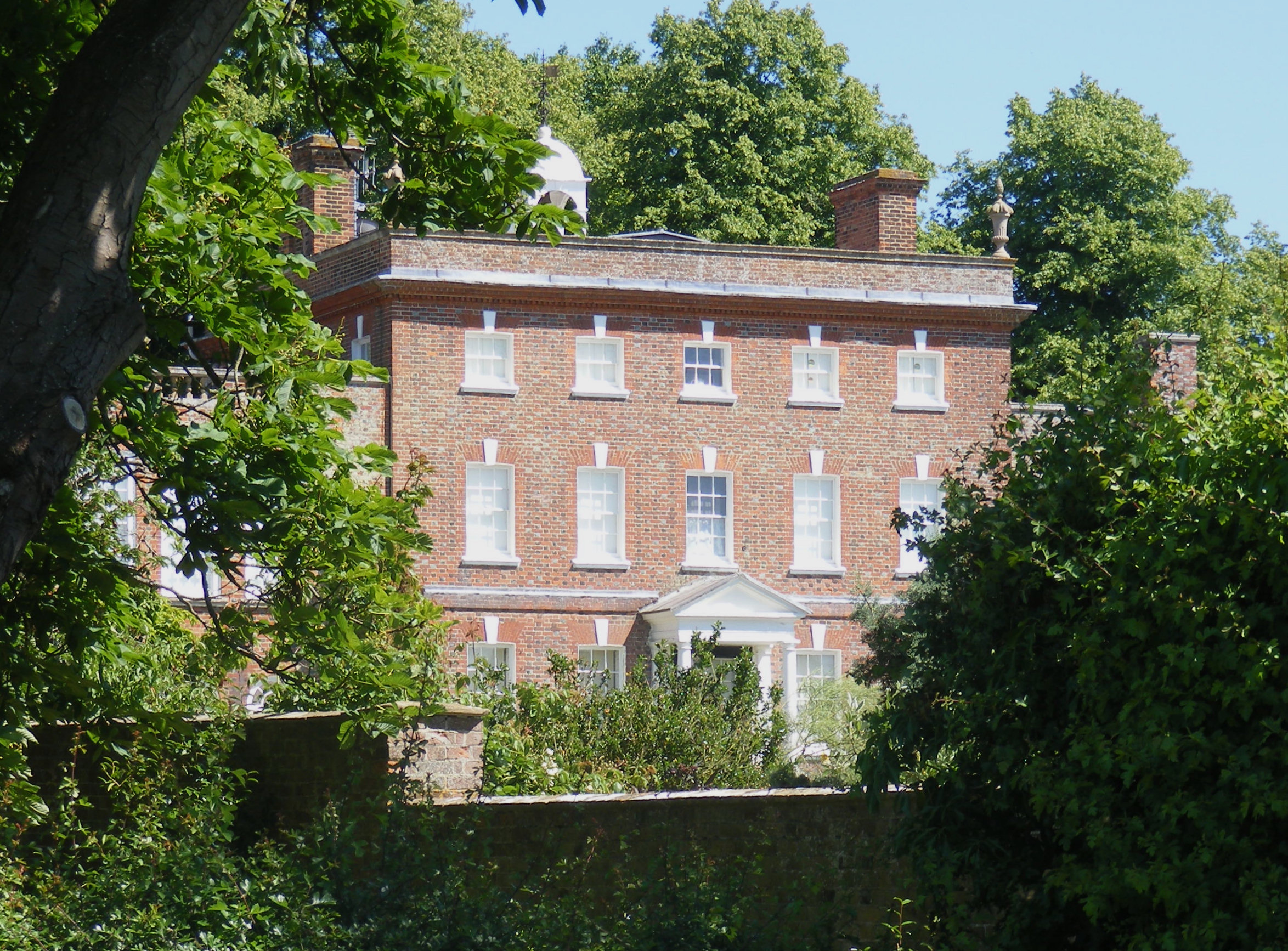
- Interactive map of the Oare House area

General information
- Type: House
- Location: Oare, Wiltshire, United Kingdom
- Coordinates: 51.3659°N 1.7774°W

Oare House is a Grade I listed country house in Oare, Wiltshire, England.

The house was built in 1740 for a London wine merchant, Henry Deacon. It was largely remodelled in the early 1920s by the architect Clough Williams-Ellis, for Sir Geoffrey Fry, 1st Baronet, private secretary to Bonar Law and Stanley Baldwin. Its gardens, which include a summerhouse also designed by Williams-Ellis, are listed Grade II on the Register of Historic Parks and Gardens. To the west of the gardens stands the Oare Pavilion, completed in 2003 and the only British building designed by I. M. Pei.

In 1965 Oare House was purchased by Sir Alick Downer, the Australian High Commissioner, who used it to entertain high ranking figures in English and Australian society.

It is currently owned by Sir Henry Keswick.
