= Sofka Zinovieff =

British author & journalist (born 1961)

Sofka Euridice Zinovieff (born 1961) is a British author and journalist.

== Early life ==
Zinovieff was born in London. Her parents were Peter Zinovieff and Victoria Gala Heber-Percy. Her paternal grandparents were White Russians who had left Soviet Russia for the United Kingdom shortly after the October Revolution. Zinovieff would later write a biography of her grandmother, Sofka Skipwith. Her maternal grandfather was the noted eccentric aristocrat Robert Heber-Percy, whose property, including the Faringdon House estate in Oxfordshire, she inherited at the age of 25; through him she is a descendant of Algernon Percy, 1st Earl of Beverley, of the family of the Dukes of Northumberland.

She grew up in Putney in south-west London, where her father was founder of Britain's first synthesizer manufacturer, Electronic Music Studios (London) Ltd. She studied social anthropology at Cambridge University. This included a PhD, based on ethnographic research in the Peloponnese. The PhD was awarded in 1990.

== Career ==
Zinovieff has worked as a journalist and book reviewer for various British publications. She has written books in several genres, including memoirs, biographies and novels. Her first novel, The House on Paradise Street, explores the legacy of the Greek Civil War through the life of an Athenian family. Papargyriou praises the book for being unusual among novels on Greece in English, because it avoids an Orientalist perspective.

== Personal life ==
Sofka Zinovieff has lived and worked in Russia, Italy, and, for many years, in Greece. She and her Greek husband Vassilis Papadimitriou live between Athens and London. They have two daughters, one of whom, Anna Papadimitriou, is a musician and composer.

== Works ==
- Eurydice Street: A Place in Athens (Granta, 2004). ISBN 1-86207-750-9 ISBN 978-1-86207-750-8
- Red Princess: A Revolutionary Life (Granta, 2007). ISBN 1-86207-919-6 ISBN 978-1-86207-919-9
- The House on Paradise Street (Short Books, 2012). ISBN 978-1-907595-69-1
- The Mad Boy, Lord Berners, My Grandmother and Me (Jonathan Cape, 2014). ISBN 978-0-22409-659-1
- Putney (Bloomsbury Publishing, 2018) ISBN 9781408895757
- Stealing Dad (Corsair, 2025) ISBN 9781472159748
