= Cottrell (surname) =

Cottrell is a surname. Notable people with the surname include:

- Alan Cottrell (1919–2012), British metallurgist and physicist
- Ann Cottrell Free, American journalist
- Anthony Cottrell, one of the investors in the Port Phillip Association
- Arthur Cottrell (1885–1918), American football coach
- Bill Cottrell (1944–2025), American football player
- Blair Cottrell, an Australian far-right extremist
- Chris Cottrell, American entrepreneur
- Con Cottrell, Irish sportsperson
- Dorthia Cottrell (born 1986), American singer and musician
- Elizabeth Cottrell (born 1975), American geologist
- Erin Cottrell (born 1975), American actress
- Frank Cottrell-Boyce, British screenwriter and novelist
- Frederick Gardner Cottrell (1877–1948), American inventor and physical chemist
- George Cottrell (born 1993), British former politician, financier, and convicted felon
- George Cottrell (rugby) (1881–1963), English rugby union and rugby league footballer
- Graham Cottrell (born 1945), English cricketer and teacher
- James La Fayette Cottrell, American politician from Alabama
- Jim Cottrell, American football linebacker
- Leonard Cottrell, British writer and archaeologist
- Louis Cottrell Sr. (1878–1927), jazz drummer
- Louis Cottrell Jr. (1911–1978), jazz reedist
- Myron Cottrell, founder and owner of TPI Specialties
- Nathan Cottrell (born 1996), American football player
- Patrick Cottrell (born 1981), American writer
- Peter Cottrell, British historian and novelist
- Porter Cottrell, American professional bodybuilder
- Raymond Cottrell, Seventh-day Adventist theologian
- Robert Cottrell (1815–1880), coachbuilder and politician in South Australia
- Sheldon Cottrell, West Indian cricket player and Jamaican Defense Force soldier
- Stephen Cottrell, Archbishop of York
- T. J. Cottrell, American football player
- Ted Cottrell, defensive coordinator for the San Diego Chargers
- Thomas Cottrell, Canadian politician from New Brunswick
- Travis Cottrell, American contemporary Christian music (CCM) artist, songwriter, author and worship leader
- William Cottrell, convicted arsonist

== See also ==
- Cotterell (disambiguation)
- Cottrill, surname
