= John Cotterell (disambiguation) =

John Cotterell was an English clergyman and academic.

John Cotterell may also refer to:

- John Coterell (fl. 1390–1421), MP for Wallingford
- Sir John Cotterell, 1st Baronet (1757–1845), MP for Herefordshire
- Sir John Henry Cotterell, 2nd Baronet (1830–1847), of the Cotterell baronets
- Sir John Cotterell, 4th Baronet (1866–1937), of the Cotterell baronets, Lord Lieutenant of Herefordshire
- Sir John Henry Geers Cotterell, 6th Baronet (born 1935), of the Cotterell baronets

== See also ==
- Cotterell (disambiguation)
