= Lygon =

Lygon (pronounced /ˈlɪɡən/ LIG-ən) is the surname of a British aristocratic family. Notable people with the surname include:

- William Lygon, 1st Earl Beauchamp (1747–1816), British politician
- William Lygon, 2nd Earl Beauchamp (1783–1823), British politician, son of the first earl
- Henry Lygon, 4th Earl Beauchamp (1784–1863), British soldier and politician, son of the first earl
- Edward Pyndar Lygon (1786–1860), British Army general and politician, son of the first earl
- Henry Lygon, 5th Earl Beauchamp (1829–1866), British politician, son of the fourth earl
- Frederick Lygon, 6th Earl Beauchamp (1830–1891), British Conservative politician, son of the fourth earl
- Lady Mary Lygon (1869–1927), after her marriage Lady Mary Trefusis (or Forbes-Trefusis), daughter of the sixth earl
- William Lygon, 7th Earl Beauchamp (1872–1938), British politician, leader of the Liberal Party, and Governor of New South Wales, son of the sixth earl
- William Lygon, 8th Earl Beauchamp (1903–1979), politician, son of the seventh earl
- Hugh Lygon (1904–1936), son of the seventh earl
- Lady Lettice Lygon (1906–1973), English socialite, daughter of the seventh earl
- Lady Sibell Lygon (1907–2005), English socialite, daughter of the seventh earl
- Lady Mary Lygon (1910–1982), Russian princess by marriage, daughter of the seventh earl
- Lady Dorothy Lygon (1912–2001), English socialite, daughter of the seventh earl

== See also ==
- Ligon (disambiguation)
- Lygon Street, Melbourne, Australia
- Lygonia, a proprietary province in pre-colonial Maine
