= Sir John Cotterell, 4th Baronet =

English baronet

Sir John Cotterell, Bt

Lord Lieutenant of Herefordshire
- In office 5 December 1904 – 27 July 1933
- Preceded by: John Hungerford Arkwright
- Succeeded by: The Lord Somers

High Sheriff of Herefordshire
- In office 1897–1898
- Preceded by: Henry Randolph Trafford
- Succeeded by: John Riley

Personal details
- Born: 13 July 1866
- Died: 13 November 1937 (aged 71) Mayfair, London
- Spouse: Lady Evelyn Amy Gordon-Lennox (m. 1896; died 1922)
- Relations: Richard Airey, 1st Baron Airey (grandfather)
- Children: 4
- Parent(s): Sir Geers Cotterell, 3rd Baronet; Hon. Katherine Margaret Airey

Sir John Richard Geers Cotterell, 4th Baronet (13 July 1866 – 13 November 1937) was an English baronet.

== Early life ==
Cotterell was born on 13 July 1866. He was the son of Sir Geers Cotterell, 3rd Baronet and Hon. Katherine Margaret Airey. His father, an MP for Herefordshire, had succeeded to the baronetcy in 1847, upon the death of his brother (John's uncle) John Henry Cotterell.

His paternal grandparents were Sir John Henry Cotterell (heir apparent to Sir John Cotterell, 1st Baronet) and Hon. Pyne Jesse Trevor (daughter of Henry Trevor, 21st Baron Dacre). His grandfather died before his father was born and his grandmother remarried shortly thereafter to Granville Harcourt Vernon, MP. His maternal grandparents were Richard Airey, 1st Baron Airey, and the former Hon. Harriet Mary Evard Talbot (a daughter of James Talbot, 3rd Baron Talbot of Malahide and sister to James Talbot, 4th Baron Talbot of Malahide).

== Career ==
He gained the rank of Captain in the 1st Life Guards and President of the Hereford Territorial Army Association from 1904 to 1933. He was appointed High Sheriff of Herefordshire in 1897 and served as Lord Lieutenant of Herefordshire from 1904 to 1933. Cotterell served as an Alderman of Herefordshire County Council. In 1930, he was appointed a member of the Royal Commission on the Historical Monuments of England. He was also a renowned breeder of Hereford cattle.

Upon the death of his father on 17 March 1900, he succeeded as the 4th Baronet Cotterell, of Garnons, Herefordshire.

== Personal life ==
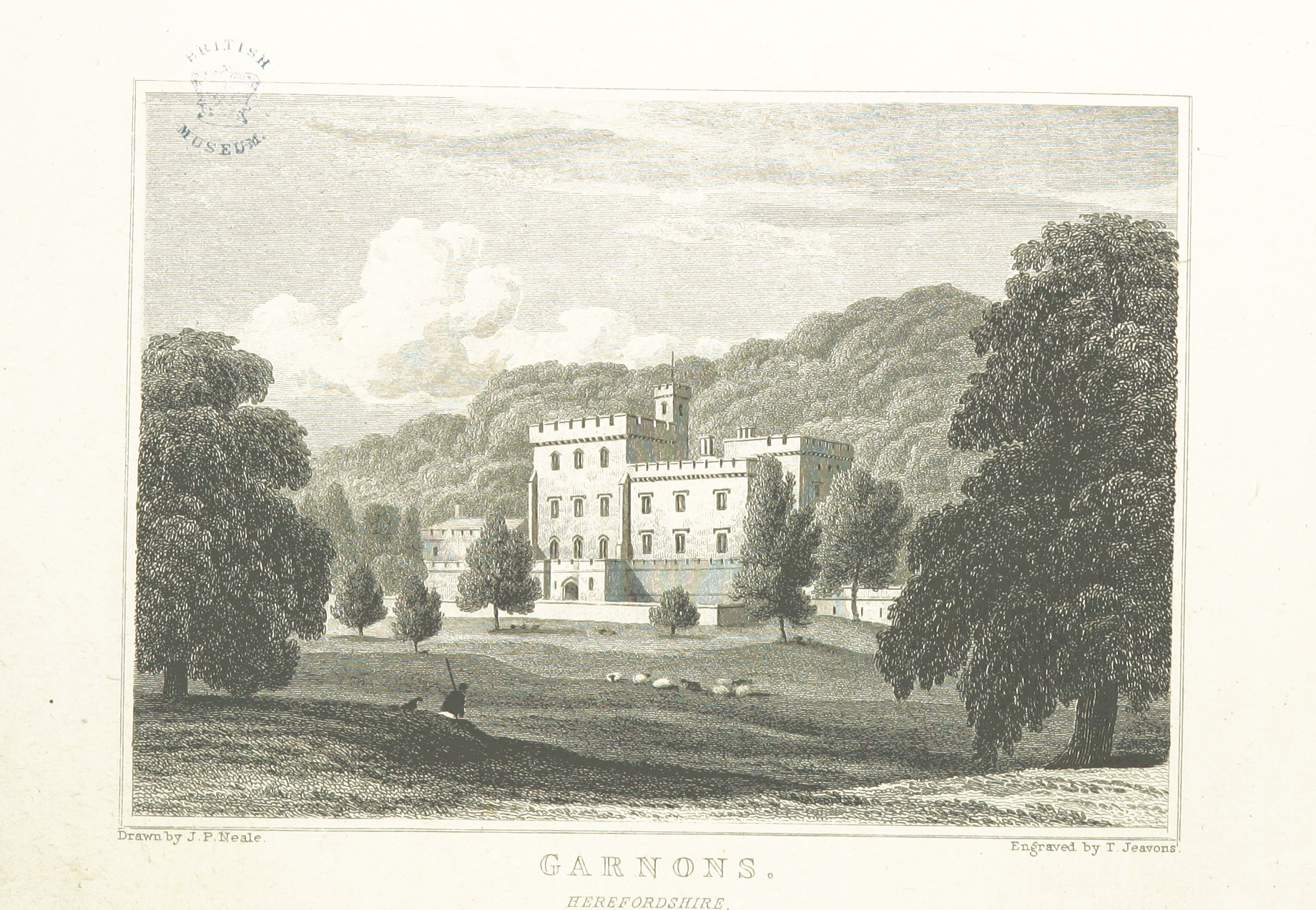
Garnons, the Cotterell's country seat in Herefordshire, 1824

On 4 January 1896, Cotterell married Lady Evelyn Amy Gordon-Lennox (1872–1922), the eldest daughter of the former Amy Mary Ricardo and Charles Gordon-Lennox, 7th Duke of Richmond. Together, they were the parents of four children:

- Sylvia Evelyn Cotterell (1896–1944), who married Capt. Christopher Digby Leyland, son of Christopher John Leyland of Haggerston Castle, in 1916. They divorced in 1929 and she married Roland Norris Fawcett later that same year.
- Cicely Violet Cotterell (1898–1974), who married Capt. William Adrian Vincent Bethell, son of William Bethell and Hon. Mairi Willoughby (daughter of Henry Willoughby, 8th Baron Middleton), in 1921. He had been married previously to Hon. Clare Tennant. After his death in 1941, she married Roden Powlett Graves Orde, son of Roden Horace Powlett Orde, in 1946.
- Mildred Katharine Cotterell (1902–1989), who married Lt.-Col. Sir Terence Falkiner, 8th Baronet, son of Sir Leslie Falkiner, 7th Baronet, in 1925.
- Sir Richard Charles Geers Cotterell, 5th Baronet (1907–1978), a Lt.-Col. in the Royal Artillery Shropshire Yeomanry who married Lady Lettice Lygon, daughter of William Lygon, 7th Earl Beauchamp and Lady Lettice Mary Elizabeth Grosvenor (a daughter of Victor Alexander Grosvenor, Earl Grosvenor), in 1930. They divorced in 1958 and he married Hon. Molly Patricia Berry, daughter of William Berry, 1st Viscount Camrose, later that same year.

In 1934, Sir John's portrait was painted by Philip de László. In the portrait, he is seated "wearing the ceremonial uniform of the Life Guards with decorations, a black great coat over his shoulders, holding a sword in his left hand and a glove in his right resting on his knee". László had previously done a number of portraits for the family, including his wife in 1913, daughter Sylvia in 1924, and son Richard and daughter-in-law Lady Lettice. in 1931.

He died on 13 November 1937 at his London home, 10 Hertford Street. He was succeeded in the baronetcy by his only son, Richard. Garnons, the family seat, was requisitioned during the war years and the family relocated to Byford Court.

=== Descendants ===
Through his son Richard, he was a grandfather of John Henry Geers Cotterell, who became the 6th Baronet in 1978.

Honorary titles
Preceded by John Hungerford Arkwright	Lord Lieutenant of Herefordshire; 1904–1933	Succeeded by The Lord Somers
Baronetage of the United Kingdom
Preceded by Geers Henry Cotterell	Baronet (of Garnons); 1900–1937	Succeeded by Richard Charles Geers Cotterell
