= List of Royal National College for the Blind people =

The following is a list of people associated with the Royal National College for the Blind.

== Staff ==
List of Principals
Years	Principal
1871–1912	Francis Joseph Campbell
1912–1929	Guy Marshall Campbell
1929–1934	Louie Bealby Campbell
1934–1937	William Stone
1937–1966	Dr Langdon
1966–1976	Alfred Lidster
1976–1991	Lance Marshall
1991–1992	Dr Michael Semple
1992–1999	Dr Colin Housby-Smith
1999–2006	Roisin Burge
2006–2008	Christine Steadman
2008–2009	Ian Pickford (acting)
2009–2011	Geoff Draper
2011–Present	Sheila Tallon

- Thomas Rhodes Armitage, Victorian philanthropist and co-founder
- Francis Joseph Campbell, American anti-slavery campaigner, co-founder of RNC and its first principal
- Tony Larkin, former professional footballer and England Blind Football team coach, head of sport and recreation at RNC
- Sarah M. Dawson Merrill (1843-1899), American educator

== Patrons ==
- Queen Victoria, the college's first Patron
- King Charles III, current Patron since 1997

== Vice patrons and other supporters ==
=== Vice patrons ===
- Edward VII of the United Kingdom
- Alexandra of Denmark
- Alfred, Duke of Saxe-Coburg and Gotha
- Grand Duchess Maria Alexandrovna of Russia
- Princess Louise, Duchess of Argyll

=== Governors ===
- Hugh Grosvenor, 1st Duke of Westminster
- Anthony Ashley-Cooper, 7th Earl of Shaftesbury
- Thomas Anson, 2nd Earl of Lichfield
- W. H. Smith, M.P.
- Sir John Terry, film financier and manager of the National Film Finance Corporation

=== Other supporters ===
- Susan Bligh, Countess of Darnley, current Lord Lieutenant of Herefordshire, Appeals Patron
- Sir Thomas Dunne, former Lord Lieutenant of Herefordshire, Appeals Patron
- Des Kelly, Daily Mail columnist and BBC Sports presenter, patron of the England Blind Football team
- Gabby Logan, BBC Sports presenter, patron of the England Blind Football team

== Presidents and vice presidents ==
=== Current president ===
- Jessica White

=== Current vice presidents ===
- Archbishop of Canterbury
- Archbishop of York
- Archbishop of Westminster
- Patricia Knatchbull, 2nd Countess Mountbatten of Burma
- Michael Buerk
- Lord Mayor of London (ex officio)
- Paul Keetch, former MP for Hereford (ex officio)
- Master of the Worshipful Company of Musicians (ex officio)

== Alumni ==
- David Blunkett, British Labour Party politician and former Home Secretary
- Alfred Hollins, English composer and organist
- William Henry Jackson, Anglican priest, missionary and inventor of Burmese Braille
- Anthony Kappes, Paralympic cyclist
- Ryan Kelly, actor; in 1997 became the first completely blind student to join the Bristol Old Vic Theatre School; plays Jack 'Jazzer' McCreary in Radio 4's The Archers
