= Sir Henry Cotterell, 6th Baronet =

Sir John Henry Geers Cotterell, 6th Baronet (8 May 1935 – 4 December 2017) was a Hereford businessman and politician.

== Early life ==
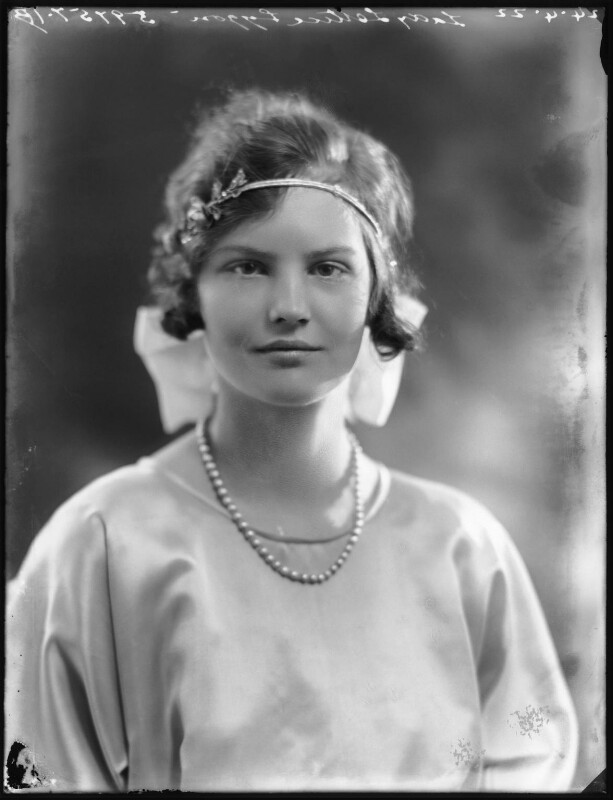
Photograph of his mother, Lady Lettice Lygon, 1922

Cotterell, usually went by his middle name of Henry, was born on 8 May 1935 in Belgrave Square, London. He was the son of Lt.-Col. Sir Richard Cotterell, 5th Baronet and Lady Lettice Lygon. His parents divorced in 1958 and his father married Hon. Molly Patricia Berry (daughter of William Berry, 1st Viscount Camrose) while his mother never remarried. Among his siblings was Rose Evelyn Cotterell, the wife of Charles Hambro, Baron Hambro, heir to the Hambros Bank fortune.

His paternal grandparents were Sir John Cotterell, 4th Baronet and Lady Evelyn Amy Gordon-Lennox (the eldest daughter of the former Amy Mary Ricardo and Charles Gordon-Lennox, 7th Duke of Richmond). His maternal grandparents were William Lygon, 7th Earl Beauchamp and Lady Lettice Mary Elizabeth Grosvenor (a daughter of Victor Alexander Grosvenor, Earl Grosvenor).

He was raised at Garnons, the family seat in Herefordshire, but later moved to Byford Court when Garnons was requisitioned during the War. He was educated at Eton before he was commissioned in the service of the Royal Horse Guards at Windsor in 1955. He later served in Knightsbridge as part of the Household Cavalry's mounted regiment and attended Royal Military Academy, Sandhurst.

== Career ==
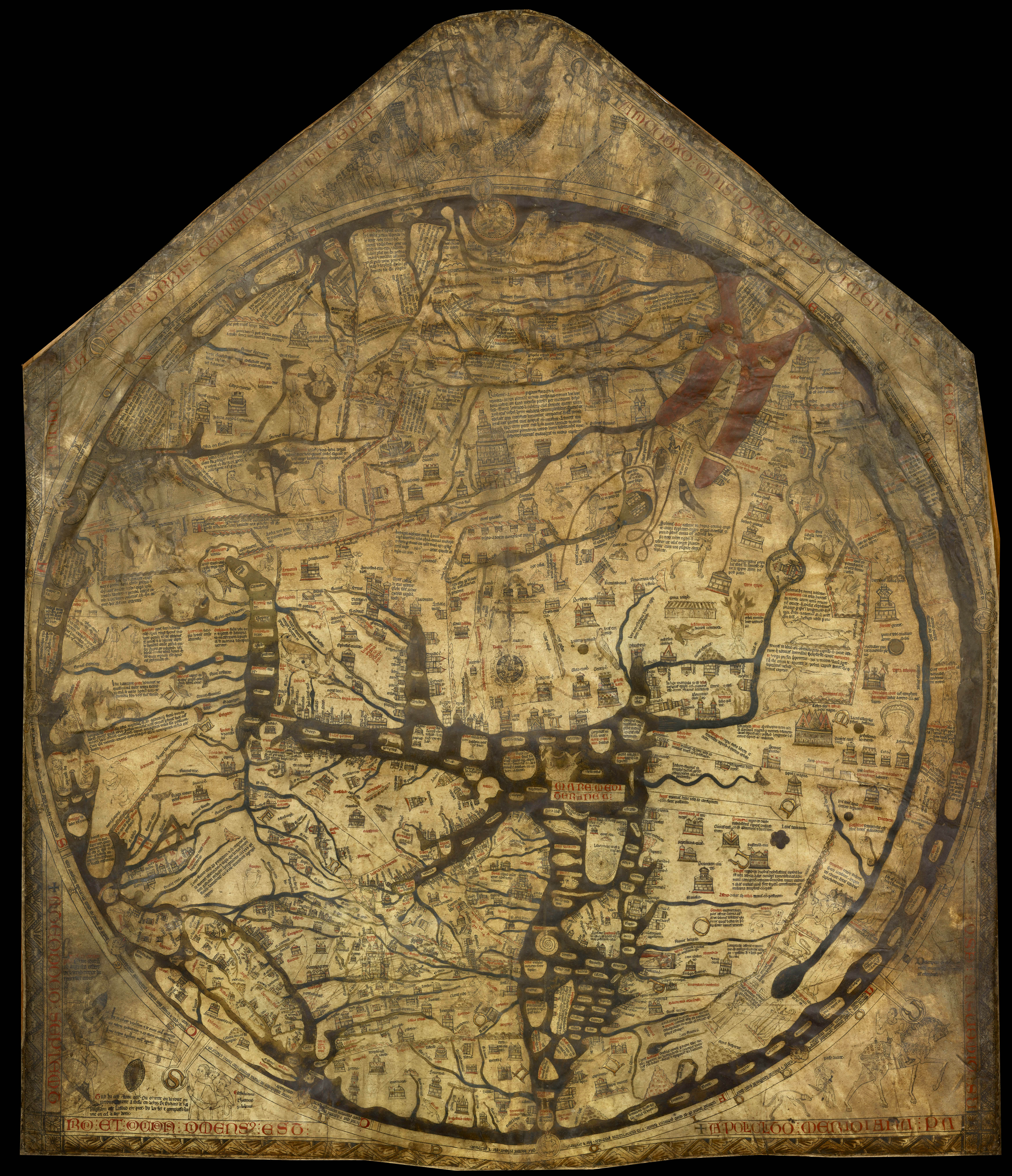
The Hereford Mappa Mundi

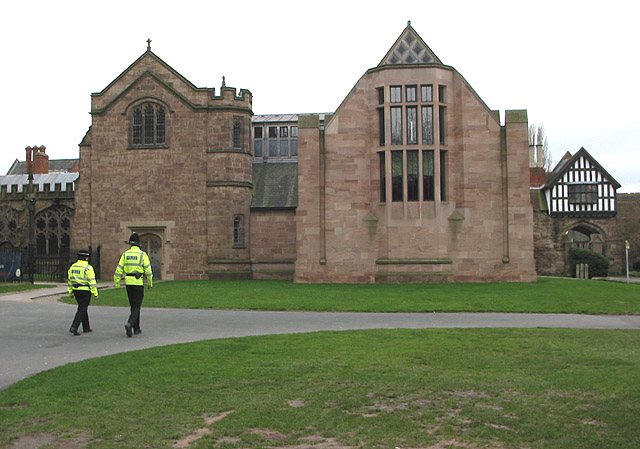
The new library at Hereford Cathedral (right) where the map is now housed

After studying at the Royal Agricultural College Cirencester in 1961, Cotterell returned to Garnons and retired from the military before serving as a county councillor for 25 years, first with the Herefordshire County Council and, after reorganisation, for the Hereford and Worcester County Council between 1977 and 1981. He served as Vice-Lord Lieutenant of Herefordshire in 1998. In 1988, when the Mappa Mundi was under threat, he was appointed chairman of the trustees of the Hereford Cathedral treasure to raise money to construct a new library, negotiating church and heritage politics in order to keep the Mappa Mundi in Hereford.

Upon the death of his father on 5 December 1978, he succeeded as the 6th Baronet Cotterell, of Garnons, Herefordshire.

=== Business career ===
In the late 1970s he founded Radio Wyvern (the name was derived from the River Wye and River Severn, the rivers running through Hereford and Worcester), today known as Hits Radio Herefordshire & Worcestershire. He served as the first chairman until the company was sold to Murfin Music International in the mid 1990s. He also served on the board of Welsh Water.

== Personal life ==
On 7 October 1959, he married Vanda Alexandra Clare Bridgewater, daughter of Maj. Philip Alexander Clement Bridgewater and Hon. Ursula Vanda Maud Vivian (a daughter of George Vivian, 4th Baron Vivian). Her parents were divorced in 1946 and her mother married, Sir William Wrixon-Becher, 5th Baronet in 1946. They also divorced she married, thirdly, David Boyle, 9th Earl of Glasgow, in 1962. Together, Henry and Alexandra were the parents of four children:

- Sir Henry Richard Geers Cotterell, 7th Baronet (b. 1961), who married Carolyn Suzanne Beckwith-Smith, daughter of John Moore Beckwith-Smith, in 1986. After her death in 1999, he married Katherine Mary Bromley, daughter of Alec Gerald Bromley, in 2002.
- Camilla Jane Cotterell (b. 1963), who married Mark James Kenneth Houldsworth in 1993.
- James Alexander Geers Cotterell (b. 1964), who married Maria C. B. McManus, daughter of W. F. McManus, in 1991. They divorced and he married Jacqueline Hicks, daughter of C. Hicks, in 2009.
- David George Geers Cotterell (b. 1968)

Lady Cotterell died in 2005. Sir Henry died on 4 December 2017 at age 82. After a funeral service at Byford, a memorial was held for him at Hereford Cathedral.

=== Sporting ===
Sir Henry was a fan of cricket and a proponent of National Hunt racing, having ridden in point to points in his youth. He served as a steward at Hereford, Cheltenham, Ascot, Ludlow and Wolverhampton and was on the disciplinary committee of the Jockey Club.

Baronetage of the United Kingdom
Preceded by Richard Charles Geers Cotterell	Baronet (of Garnons); 1978–2017	Succeeded by Henry Richard Geers Cotterell
