= Sir Richard Cotterell, 5th Baronet =

British soldier

Lieutenant Colonel Sir John Cotterell, Bt CBE TD JP

Lord Lieutenant of Herefordshire
- In office 28 February 1945 – 12 July 1957
- Preceded by: The Lord Somers
- Succeeded by: The Viscount Cilcennin

Personal details
- Born: Richard Charles Geers Cotterell; 1 June 1907
- Died: 5 December 1978 (aged 71)
- Spouse(s): Lady Lettice Lygon (m. 1930; div. 1958) Molly Seely, Baroness Sherwood (after 1958)
- Relations: Sir Geers Cotterell, 3rd Baronet (grandfather); Charles Gordon-Lennox, 7th Duke of Richmond (grandfather); Amy Gordon-Lennox, Countess of March (grandmother)
- Children: 4, including Henry
- Parent(s): Sir John Cotterell, 4th Baronet; Lady Evelyn Amy Gordon-Lennox
- Education: Eton College
- Alma mater: Royal Military College, Sandhurst

Lt-Col Sir Richard Charles Geers Cotterell, 5th Baronet CBE TD JP KStJ (1 June 1907 – 5 December 1978), was a British soldier.

== Early life ==
Cotterell was born on 1 June 1907. He was the only son of Sir John Cotterell, 4th Baronet and Lady Evelyn Amy Gordon-Lennox. His three older sisters were Sylvia Evelyn Cotterell (wife of Capt. Christopher Digby Leyland and she married Roland Norris Fawcett), Cicely Violet Cotterell (wife of Capt. William Adrian Vincent Bethell and Roden Powlett Graves Orde), and Mildred Katharine Cotterell (wife of Lt.-Col. Sir Terence Falkiner, 8th Baronet).

His paternal grandparents were Sir Geers Cotterell, 3rd Baronet (MP for Herefordshire) and Hon. Katherine Margaret Airey (a daughter of Richard Airey, 1st Baron Airey). His mother was the eldest daughter of Charles Gordon-Lennox, 7th Duke of Richmond and, his first wife, the former Amy Mary Ricardo.

He was educated at Eton before attending Royal Military College, Sandhurst.

== Career ==
On 13 November 1937, he succeeded as the 5th Baronet Cotterell, of Garnons, Herefordshire following the death of his father. He served as a Justice of the Peace for Herefordshire in 1938. He served as Lord Lieutenant of Herefordshire between 1945 and 1957. He also served as a Forestry Commissioner between 1945 and 1964.

=== Military career ===
He fought in the Middle East and Italy during World War II, was mentioned in despatches and was awarded the Territorial Decoration. He was commanding officer of the 76th (Shropshire Yeomanry) Medium Regiment, Royal Artillery between 1943 and 1945, achieving the rank of lieutenant colonel. He was appointed a Knight of Order of Saint John and Commander of the Order of the British Empire in 1965.

== Personal life ==
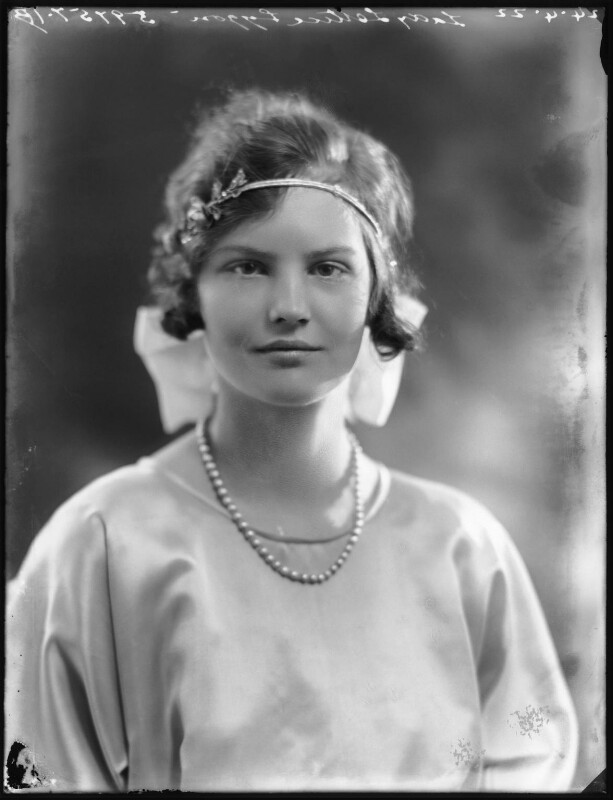
Photograph of his first wife, Lady Lettice Lygon, 1922

On 16 June 1930, Cotterell married Lady Lettice Lygon at St George's, Hanover Square. She was a daughter of William Lygon, 7th Earl Beauchamp and Lady Lettice Mary Elizabeth Grosvenor (a daughter of Victor Alexander Grosvenor, Earl Grosvenor). Before their divorce in 1958, they were the parents of:

- Rose Evelyn Cotterell (1932–2006), who married Charles Hambro, Baron Hambro, heir to the Hambros Bank fortune.
- Anne Lettice Cotterell (b. 1933), who married Charles St Clair, 17th Lord Sinclair, in 1968.
- Sir John Henry Geers Cotterell, 6th Baronet (1935–2017), who married Alexandra Bridgewater in 1959.
- Thomas Richard Geers Cotterell (1939–2019)

On 21 July 1958, he married Molly Seely, Baroness Sherwood (née Hon. Molly Patricia Berry), at the Caxton Hall Register Office in London. She was daughter of William Berry, 1st Viscount Camrose, who owned The Daily Telegraph newspaper, and Mary Agnes Corns (a daughter of Thomas Corns). Molly was widow of Roger Charles George Chetwode (a son of Philip Chetwode, 1st Baron Chetwode), with whom she had two children, including Philip Chetwode, 2nd Baron Chetwode. After the death of her first husband she married Hugh Seely, 1st Baron Sherwood (a son of Sir Charles Seely, 2nd Baronet), whom she divorced in 1948.

Cotterell died on 5 December 1978 at home at Garnons, Herefordshire. He was succeeded in the baronetcy by his eldest son, John. His memorial was held at Hereford Cathedral and officiated by Norman Rathbone, the Dean of Hereford, who was assisted by Canon Allan Shaw.

=== Portrait ===
In 1931, Sir John and his wife Lady Lettice had their portraits painted by Philip de László. In his portrait, he is pictured "Half-length slightly to the left, full face to the viewer, wearing the ceremonial uniform of the Royal Horse Guards, holding his red-plumed helmet in his right hand". László had previously done a number of portraits for his family, including of his mother in 1913, sister Sylvia in 1924, and later, his father in 1934.

Honorary titles
Preceded by The Lord Somers	Lord Lieutenant of Herefordshire; 28 February 1945 – 12 July 1957	Succeeded by The Viscount Cilcennin
Baronetage of the United Kingdom
Preceded by John Richard Geers Cotterell	Baronet (of Garnons); 1937–1978	Succeeded by John Henry Geers Cotterell
