= Lady Sibell Lygon =

English socialite (1907-2005)

Sibell Lygon
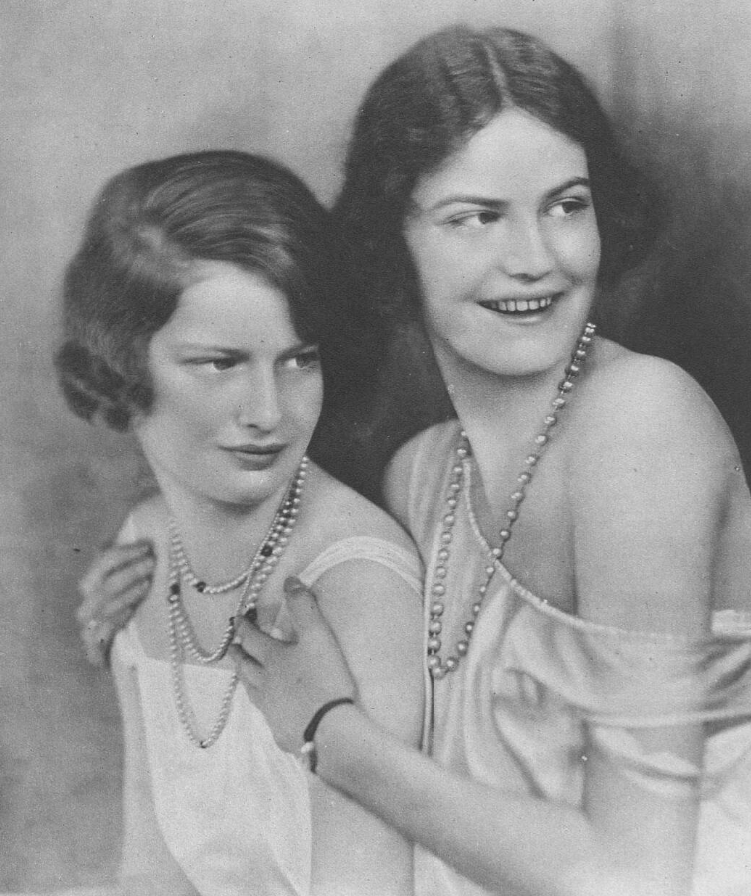
- Lygon (right) with her sister Lettice (left) in 1926
- Born: 10 October 1907
- Died: 31 October 2005 (aged 98)
- Burial place: Madresfield, England, United Kingdom
- Spouse: Michael Rowley (m. 1939)
- Parent(s): William Lygon; Lettice Grosvenor

Lady Sibell Lygon (10 October 1907 – 31 October 2005) was an English socialite known for her membership in the Bright Young Things.

== Biography ==
Lady Sibell Lygon was born on 10 October 1907, the daughter of William Lygon and Lady Lettice Grosvenor.

An incident when Sibell and her sister, Mary, remained closed out of their home, Halkin House, inspired a scene of Evelyn Waugh's Vile Bodies. Most of their life at Madresfield inspired Brideshead Revisited.

Sibell Lygon was the receptionist at the hairdressing and beauty establishment in Bond Street run by Violet Cripps, former wife of her maternal uncle, Hugh Grosvenor. She was also a Socialist and a journalist and contributed stories to Harper's Bazaar.

In 1935, her name was linked to that of George II of Greece, together with Primrose Salt, Lady Mary Lygon, and Bridget Poulett.

On 11 February 1939, Lady Sibell Lygon married Michael Rowley, an aircraft designer eight years her junior, son of Violet Cripps. Since the previous marriage of Rowley was not legally dissolved, the 1939 marriage was considered bigamy and they married again in 1949. He died of a brain tumor in 1952.

In 1953, she was named Master of the Ledbury Hunt.

She lived at Droitwich and Stow-on-the-Wold. She had a relationship with Francis Byrne Warman and Harry Primrose.

She died on 31 October 2005, aged 98, and was buried at Madresfield.

== Ancestry ==
Ancestors of Lady Sibell Lygon

Henry Lygon
Frederick Lygon
Susan Eliot
William Lygon
Philip Stanhope
Mary Stanhope
Emily Kerrison
Sibell Lygon
Hugh Grosvenor
Victor Grosvenor
Constance Sutherland-Leveson-Gower
Lettice Grosvenor
Sibell Lumley
