= Cotterell =

Cotterell may refer to:

== People ==
- Cotterell baronets, a title in the Baronetage of the United Kingdom
- Sir Charles Cotterell (1615–1701), English courtier and translator
- Harry Cotterell (1841–1923), English merchant in colonial Nigeria
- John Cotterell (disambiguation)
- Reg Butler (1913–1981), English sculptor

== Other uses ==
- Cotterell Court, a multi-purpose arena in Hamilton, New York
- Cotterell Township, Dodge County, Nebraska
- Frampton Cotterell, a village in South Gloucestershire

== See also ==
- Cottrell (disambiguation)
- Cottrill (disambiguation)
