= Ligon =

Ligon may refer to:

== People ==
- Austin Ligon (born c. 1951), American businessman and investor
- Betty J. Ligon (1921–2015), American journalist
- Bill Ligon (born 1952), American basketball player
- David G. Ligon (1804–1855), American jurist and justice of the Supreme Court of Alabama
- Glenn Ligon (born 1960), American conceptual artist
- Jennie Ligon (1916–2012), also known as Jeni Le Gon, African-American dancer, dance instructor and actress
- Jim Ligon (1944–2004), American basketball player
- Joe Ligon (born 1937 or 1938), American convicted murderer
- Joe Ligon (singer) (1936–2016), American gospel singer
- Nina Ligon (born 1991), Thai equestrian
- Randy Ligon, American politician elected in 2018
- Richard Ligon (1585?–1662), English writer
- Robert F. Ligon (1823–1901), American politician
- Rufus Ligon (1903–1992), American Negro league pitcher
- Thomas Lygon or Ligon (1623–1675), colonial Virginian statesman, militia officer and landowner
- Thomas Watkins Ligon (1810–1881), American politician
- Verda Ligon (1902–1970), American painter and printmaker
- William Ligon (born 1961), American former politician
- Ligon Duncan (born 1960), American Presbyterian scholar and pastor
- Ligon Flynn (1931–2010), American architect
- Ligon or Lation Scott (1893–1917), African-American lynching victim

== Places ==
- Ligon, Georgia, United States, a ghost town
- Ligon, Kentucky, United States, an unincorporated community

== Schools ==
- Ligon Middle School (North Carolina)

== See also ==
- Lygon, the surname of a British aristocratic family
