= Cottrill =

Cottrill is a surname of British origin. Notable people with that name include:

- Alan Cottrill, American sculptor
- Deborah Cottrill (born 1963), British competitive figure skater
- Claire Cottrill (born 1998), American singer-songwriter, professionally known as Clairo
- Geoff Cottrill (born 1963), American marketer
- Jedd Philo Clark Cottrill (1832–1889), American politician in Wisconsin
- Joan Gibson Cottrill, Australian tennis player
- Joe Cottrill (1888–1972), British athlete who competed in the 1912 Summer Olympics
- John Cottrill (born 1945), Australian tennis player
- Neil Cottrill (born 1971), English badminton player
- Walter Stanley Cottrill (1914–2005), South African, 15th Chief of the Staff of The Salvation Army

== See also ==
- Cotterell (disambiguation)
- Cottrell (disambiguation)

- Cottrell (surname)

- Cottrill Opera House, known since 1915 as Sutton's Opera House or Sutton Theater, a historic vaudeville and movie theater building in Thomas, Tucker County, West Virginia
- Matthew Cottrill House, a historic house in Damariscotta, Maine
