= John Arkwright =

John Arkwright may refer to:

- John Hungerford Arkwright (1833–1905), Lord Lieutenant of Herefordshire
- John Arkwright (politician) (1872–1954), British politician, son of John Hungerford Arkwright
- Jack Arkwright (1902–1990), British rugby league footballer
