= Lord Lieutenant of Hereford and Worcester =

Civil post in Hereford and Worcester, England

The office of Lord-Lieutenant of Hereford and Worcester was created when the county of Hereford and Worcester was formed in 1974 through the merger of the former counties (and lieutenancy areas) of Herefordshire and Worcestershire. It was abolished in 1998 when Herefordshire and Worcestershire reverted into two separate ceremonial counties.

== Lord Lieutenants of Hereford and Worcester 1974-1998 ==
- Col. John Francis Maclean 1 April 1974 – 12 July 1977 (formerly Lord Lieutenant of Herefordshire)
- Sir Thomas Dunne 12 July 1977 – 31 March 1998
