= Graham Cottrell =

English cricketer and teacher

Personal information
- Full name: Graham Allan Cottrell
- Born: 23 March 1945 (age 81); Datchet, Buckinghamshire, England
- Batting: Right-handed
- Bowling: Right-arm medium

Domestic team information
- Years: Team
- 1966–1968: Cambridge University

Career statistics
Competition	First-class
Matches	39
Runs scored	1108
Batting average	16.78
100s/50s	0/2
Top score	81
Balls bowled	4044
Wickets	60
Bowling average	35.35
5 wickets in innings	0
10 wickets in match	0
Best bowling	4/31
Catches/stumpings	17/–
- Source: Cricinfo, 15 December 2014

Graham Allan Cottrell (born 23 March 1945) is a former English first-class cricketer and teacher.

== Life and career ==
Cottrell attended Kingston Grammar School before going up to St Catharine's College, Cambridge. He won a Blue for hockey at Cambridge University and also played for Cambridgeshire, but was more prominent as a cricketer, playing for the university side from 1966 to 1968 and captaining the team in 1968.

Cottrell was principally a medium-pace bowler. He took 20 wickets at an average of 38.80 in 1966 and 18 at 43.72 in 1967. His best season was 1968, when he took 22 at 25.36, including his best figures of 4 for 31 in his final first-class match, against Oxford University. He was the team's most effective bowler, but gave himself only 163 overs in 12 matches.

He sometimes scored useful runs in the lower order. His highest score was 81 against Nottinghamshire in 1967 when, after Cambridge were 69 for 6, he and Chris Pyemont added 142 for the seventh wicket at better than a run a minute. Later that season he made 50 in an hour against the touring Indian team.

Cottrell played for Surrey Second XI from 1966 to 1970. In their 17-run victory over Warwickshire Second XI in 1967 he took 4 for 2 and 5 for 48. He also played a few games of Minor Counties cricket for Cambridgeshire in 1976.

Cottrell became a school teacher. He taught at Stowe School, where he was housemaster of Cobham House from 1990 to 2000.
