= Arthur Somers-Cocks, 6th Baron Somers =

British army officer (1887–1944)

The Right Honourable The Lord Somers KCMG, DSO, MC
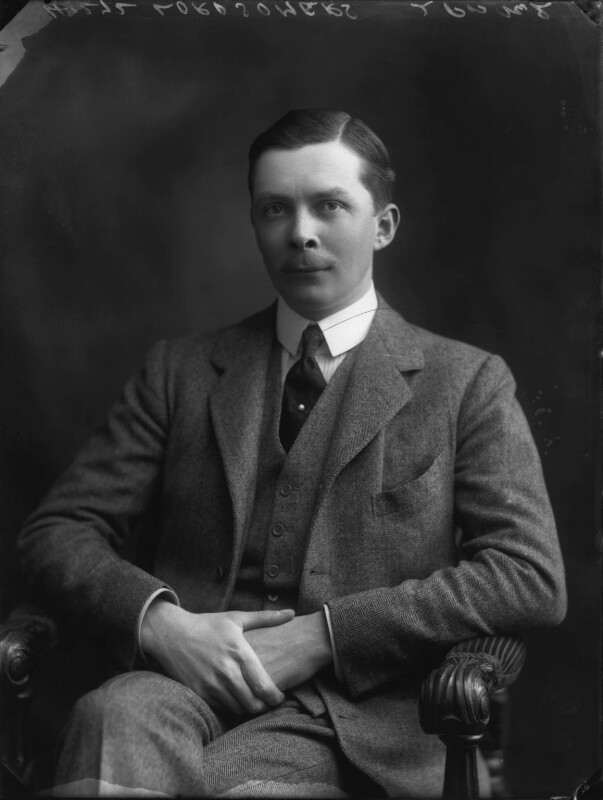
- Somers in 1912

Administrator of the Commonwealth
- In office 2 October 1930 – 21 January 1931
- Monarch: George V
- Preceded by: The Viscount Stonehaven (as Governor-General)
- Succeeded by: Sir Isaac Isaacs (as Governor-General)

16th Governor of Victoria
- In office 28 June 1926 – 23 June 1931
- Monarch: George V
- Premier: John Allan; Edmond Hogan; William McPherson
- Preceded by: Lord Stradbroke
- Succeeded by: Lord Huntingfield

Personal details
- Born: 20 March 1887 Freshwater, Isle of Wight, England
- Died: 14 July 1944 (aged 57) Ledbury, Herefordshire, England
- Spouse: Daisy Meeking (m. 1921)
- Education: New College, Oxford

Military service
- Allegiance: United Kingdom
- Branch/service: British Army
- Years of service: 1906–1922
- Rank: Lieutenant Colonel
- Commands: 6th Battalion Tank Corps
- Battles/wars: First World War
- Awards: Knight Commander of the Order of St Michael and St George; Distinguished Service Order; Military Cross; Mentioned in Despatches; Legion of Honour (France)

Arthur Herbert Tennyson Somers-Cocks, 6th Baron Somers, KCMG, DSO, MC (20 March 1887 – 14 July 1944), was a British Army officer who was the 16th Governor of Victoria, from 1926 to 1931 and Administrator of Australia in 1930–31. He had a long involvement with the Boy Scout Movement and became the Boy Scouts Association's Chief Scout of the British Empire from 1942 until his death.

== Early life ==
Somers was born in Freshwater, Isle of Wight, the eldest son of Herbert Haldane Somers-Cocks and the former Blanche Clogstoun. His godfather was Alfred, Lord Tennyson. Somers' father died when he was seven years old. He succeeded a distant relative as Baron Somers at the age of twelve. He attended Charterhouse School before going on to New College, Oxford. He was an able cricketer, and played 17 first-class games. In 1904, whilst a schoolboy at Charterhouse, he made 115 against Westminster, and two years later he made his first-class debut for Marylebone Cricket Club (MCC) against Worcestershire, scoring 0 and 13. He rarely had enough time to play cricket, but in the 1920s he made a further 16 first-class appearances for Worcestershire, his highest score being 52 against Essex in May 1925. In later life he became both a vice-president of Worcestershire County Cricket Club and, in 1936, President of the MCC.

== Military career ==
In 1906, Somers joined the British Army 1st Regiment of Life Guards, later taking leave to farm in Canada before rejoining his regiment in 1914 at the start of the First World War. He commanded the 6th Battalion of the new Tank Corps in 1918. He was twice wounded, mentioned in despatches, awarded the Military Cross, the Distinguished Service Order, and appointed to the French Legion of Honour.

== Governor of Victoria and Administrator of Australia ==
Somers was appointed Governor of Victoria in 1926. He "had charm and natural gaiety which won him popularity ... warm and generous, he had a genuine interest in people, as well as a high sense of duty and leadership ... a shrewd and successful governor". Following the expiry of Lord Stonehaven's term as Governor-General of Australia in October 1930, Somers – as the longest serving state governor – was called upon to act as Administrator of Australia until Sir Isaac Isaacs took office in January 1931.

== Freemasonry ==
Somers was initiated as a Freemason into Household Brigade Lodge No.2614 under the United Grand Lodge of England some 18 years before he arrived in Victoria and served as the Grand Master of the United Grand Lodge of Victoria between 1927 and 1932.

== Lord Somers Camp ==
In 1929, at his own expense, Somers brought together teenage boys from different backgrounds in Australia to what was named Lord Somers Camp which continues to this day. The idea of the camp was based upon the Duke of York's camps in England that operated from 1921 until the start of the Second World War.

== Scouting ==
With the governorship came the honorary position of State Chief Scout of Victoria. Somers was determined to make the role more than a ceremonial one and enthusiastically participated in Scout camps and hikes, insisting on pitching his own tent. He wore Scout uniform at these events and personally led a series of Christmas hikes in the state. In 1931, the founder of Scouting and Chief Scout of the World, Lord Baden-Powell, met Somers during a tour of Australia and was impressed by his commitment to Scouting.

On Somers' return to Britain, The Boy Scouts Association appointed Somers as its Chief Commissioner in 1932 and then its deputy Chief Scout from 1935 to 1941. Baden-Powell designated Somers as his successor as the association's Chief Scout. Following Baden-Powell's death, the Boy Scouts Association appointed Somers as its Chief Scout of the British Empire in March 1941 until his death in 1944. During his tenure as Deputy, Somers led the British contingent to the 5th World Scout Jamboree at Vogelenzang in the Netherlands. As Chief Scout, Somers wore his Scout uniform to debates in the House of Lords. In 1941 Somers established a Post War Commission to examine reforms to Scouting that could be implemented once peace had been restored. He also proposed the construction of an international Scout hostel in London as a memorial to the founder, which eventually resulted in the opening of Baden-Powell House in Kensington.

== Other appointments ==
Somers was appointed Lord Lieutenant of Herefordshire in 1933. From 1940, he was the Red Cross Commissioner for Egypt.

== Family ==
Somers married Daisy Finola Meeking in 1921 and had a daughter:

- Elizabeth Violet Virginia Somers Cocks (1922–1986), who married Major Benjamin Alexander Frederick Hervey-Bathurst (1920–1997), 2nd son of Sir Frederick Edward William Hervey-Bathurst, 5th Baronet.

== Death ==
During the early 1940s, Somers had been increasingly debilitated by throat cancer. He died at Eastnor Castle on 14 July 1944 and was cremated. A memorial service for him was held at St George's Chapel, Windsor Castle.

== Sources ==
- Hazlewood, Rex (1967). "Our Second Chief Scout". The Scout Annual 1967. London: The Boy Scouts Association.
- Moynihan, Paul, ed. (2006). An Official History of Scouting. London: Hamlyn. ISBN 978-0-600-61398-5.
- Wilson, J. S. (1959). Scouting Round the World. London: Blandford Press.

Honorary titles
Preceded by Sir John Cotterell, 4th Baronet	Lord Lieutenant of Herefordshire; 1933–1944	Succeeded by Sir Richard Cotterell, 5th Baronet
Political offices
New title New government	Lord-in-waiting; 1924–1926	Succeeded by Earl of Airlie
Government offices
Preceded by Earl of Stradbroke	Governor of Victoria; 1926–1931	Succeeded by Lord Huntingfield
Peerage of Great Britain
Preceded by Philip Cocks	Baron Somers; 1899–1944	Succeeded by Arthur Somers-Cocks
The Boy Scouts Association
Preceded by Lord Baden-Powell	The Boy Scouts Association's Chief Scout of the British Empire; 1941–1944	Succeeded by Lord Rowallan
Masonic offices
Preceded by William Bice	Grand Master of the United Grand Lodge of Victoria; 1927–1932	Succeeded by William Kerr
