= John Matthews (physician) =

English physician and poet

John Matthews (1755–1826) was a versatile English physician and poet, also involved in local affairs and politics in Herefordshire.

== Life ==
Baptised 30 October 1755, he was the only surviving child of William Matthews of Burton, in Linton, Herefordshire, who died 29 August 1799, by his wife Jane, daughter of Philip Hoskyns of Bernithen Court, Herefordshire, who died 20 May 1768. He matriculated from Merton College, Oxford, on 14 February 1772, and graduated B.A. 1778, M.A. 1779, M.B. 1781, and M.D. 1782. On 30 September 1782 he was a candidate for the Royal College of Physicians, and a year later he became a fellow.

From 20 April 1781 to his resignation in 1783 he was physician to St. George's Hospital, London, and in 1784 he delivered the Gulstonian lectures. He moved back to acquire the estate of Clehonger, near Hereford, and built on it in 1788–90 the mansion of Belmont, situated on the banks of the River Wye with extensive lawns and plantations. For the rest of his life, he took a leading part in county affairs. He acted as mayor of Hereford in 1793 and was senior alderman and magistrate for twenty years. He was also colonel of the first regiment of Hereford militia, chairman of quarter sessions, and Member of Parliament for the county from 31 March 1803 to 1806. After a protracted illness he died at Belmont on 15 January 1826; a monument to his memory was placed in the south aisle of Clehonger Church.

== Works ==
He composed many fugitive pieces in prose and verse: his published works are anonymous. The best-known of them, a parody of Alexander Pope's Eloisa to Abelard long attributed to Richard Porson, is Eloisa en Dishabille: being a New Version of that Lady's celebrated Epistle to Abelard, done into familiar English metre by a Lounger, 1780. It was reprinted in 1801, and again in 1822, when the bookseller put on the title-page that it was ‘ascribed to Porson.’ Matthews wrote A Sketch from the Landscape: A Didactic Poem, addressed to R. Payne Knight, 1794, an attack which Richard Payne Knight, in the Advertisement to the second edition of the ‘Landscape,’ stigmatised as "a sort of doggerel ode" and "a contemptible publication". The Fables from La Fontaine, in English Verse (1820) contained partisan allusions to the politics of the day.

== Family ==
Matthews married at Much Marcle, Herefordshire, on 9 November 1778, Elizabeth, daughter and heiress of Arthur Ellis, who died 7 November 1823, aged 66. They had issue: eight sons and six daughters, and among their sons were Charles Skinner Matthews, the friend of Lord Byron, and grandson Henry Matthews.

Parliament of the United Kingdom
Preceded by Sir John Cotterell, 1st Baronet; Sir George Cornewall, 2nd Baronet	MP for Herefordshire; 1803–1806; With: Sir George Cornewall, 2nd Baronet	Succeeded by Sir John Cotterell, 1st Baronet; Sir George Cornewall, 2nd Baronet
