= James Pyemont =

English cricketer

James Patrick Pyemont (born 10 April 1978) is an English cricketer. He was a right-handed batsman and a right-arm offbreak bowler.

Born in Eastbourne, Sussex, Pyemont was educated at Tonbridge School and Trinity Hall, Cambridge. He played cricket for Derbyshire and Sussex, as well as Cambridge UCCE and Cambridge University during a five-year top-level career. His match-best bowling figures are 4/101, at an average of just under 62.

In his first match in 1999, he was dismissed for a golden duck in both of his first two innings. His father is Chris Pyemont, a former blue in cricket and field hockey for Cambridge University, and headmaster of St Bede's Preparatory School, Eastbourne, before the role was taken by its current headmaster.
