= Cottrell =

Cottrell may refer to:

- Cottrell (surname)
- Cottrell, Oregon, an unincorporated community in Oregon, United States
- Mount Cottrell, Victoria, a mountain and community in Australia
- 2026 Cottrell, an asteroid

== See also ==
- Cotterell (disambiguation)
