= TPI Specialties =

TPI Specialties is the name of an auto parts manufacturer specializing in air induction and fuel delivery parts, with a particular emphasis on GM Tuned Port Injection applications.

== History ==
TPI Specialties was founded by Myron Cottrell, a professional engine builder, who had bought a new Chevrolet Corvette in 1985 and was intrigued by the potential for improvement in its Tuned Port Injection fuel injection system. Once Cottrell had sufficiently learned the intricacies of the system, he began producing aftermarket parts intended to improve power production by these engines. Today Cottrell is considered an authority on the subject of automotive fuel injection systems.

== Products ==
- Fuel Flow Regulators
- Intake Manifolds
- Fuel Injector Manifolds
- Fuel Injectors
- Throttle Bodies
- Headers
- Camshafts
- Cylinder Heads
- Suspension Components

== Market ==
Today TPI Specialties presents itself as a market leader in the field of aftermarket fuel injection systems, and is frequently referenced as such in such publications as Hot Rod Magazine and Car Craft magazine.
