= William Carr Smith =

English clergyman (1857–1930)

The Reverend William Carr Smith
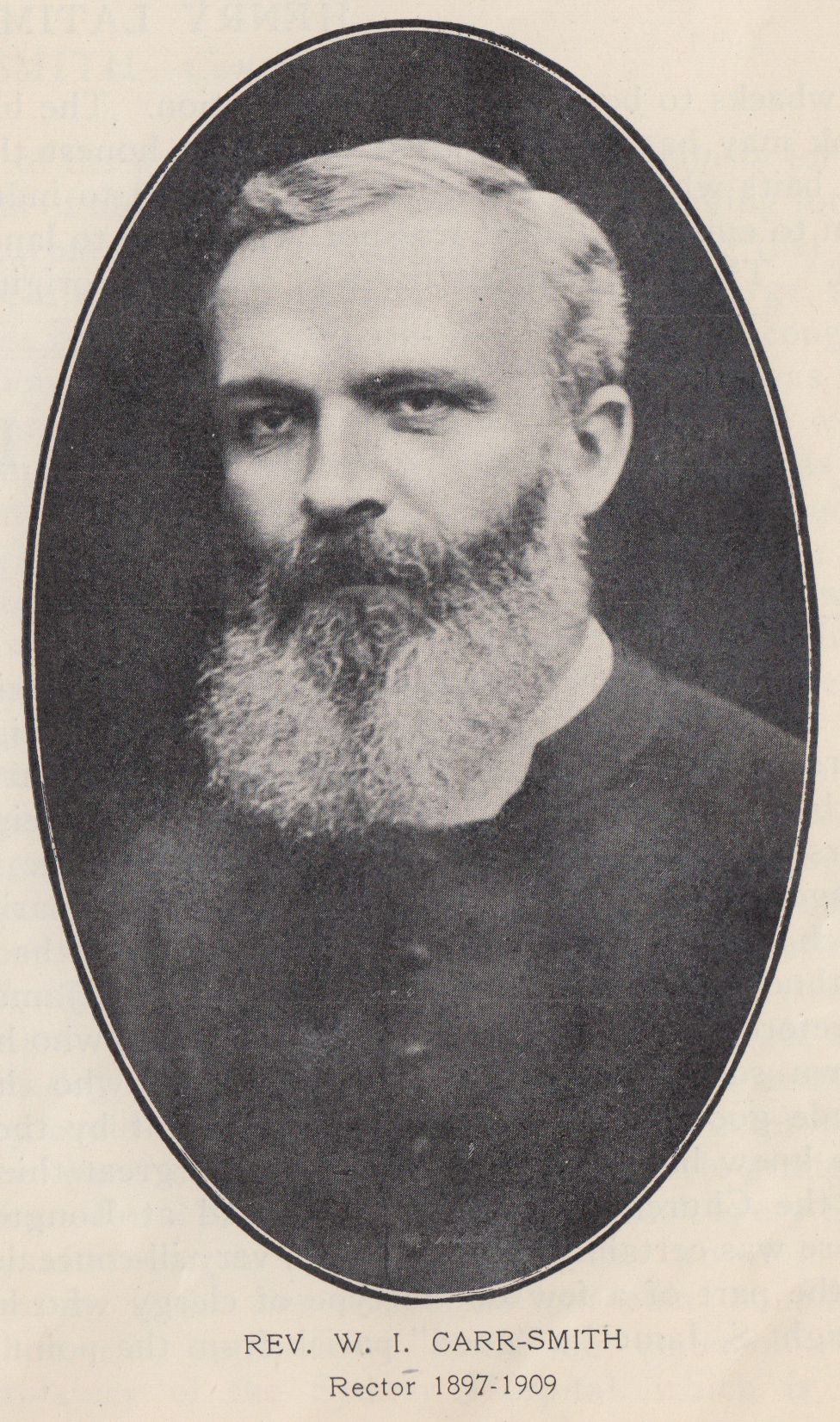
- Born: 13 October 1857; Great Yarmouth, Norfolk, Kingdom of Great Britain
- Died: 3 July 1930 (aged 72); London, England
- Parents: Elizabeth Smith (née Tolgat); George Smith

Ecclesiastical career
- Church: Church of England
- Ordained: 12 June 1881
- Congregations: St James' Church, Sydney, Grantham, Lincolnshire, Eastbourne and Forty Hill

William Carr Smith (1857–1930) was a Church of England priest, best known as the rector of St James' Church, Sydney from 1896 to 1910, whose Anglo-Catholic and Christian socialist ideals transformed Sydney's oldest church. Carr Smith's teaching was said to be "continuous, methodical, very direct, very plain, and quite fearless".

== Early years ==
William Isaac Carr Smith was born 13 October 1857, at Great Yarmouth, Norfolk, son of George Smith, a merchant seaman, and his wife Elizabeth, née Tolgat. Smith trained first as a teacher and then studied for the ministry at Lichfield Diocesan Theological College. He was ordained as a deacon in 1880 and as a priest in June 1881.

Carr served as a curate for seven years in several parishes in Staffordshire before taking the parish of St John's, Longton, in 1887. During his time as a curate he was influenced by Christian socialism. He remained unmarried all his life.

== St James', King Street ==
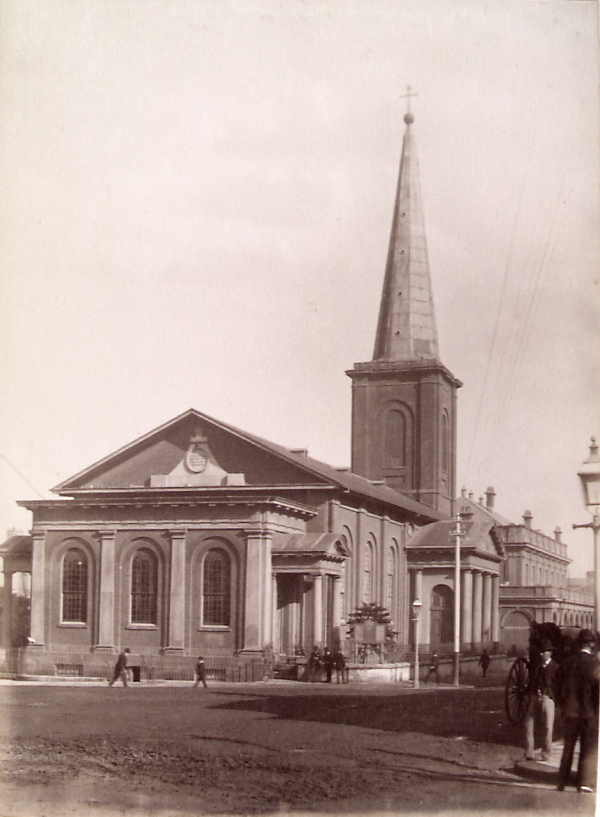
St James' Church, Sydney (1889) where Carr Smith was rector from 1896 to 1910

In October 1895, he was appointed to the church of St James' in Sydney. Built by Francis Greenway during the convict era, it was Sydney's oldest church. Although St James' was founded during a period of evangelical Protestantism, Bishop William Grant Broughton, who had made the church his pro-cathedral, supported Tractarian churchmanship. Although his successor, Bishop Frederic Barker, was an evangelical, St James, after the building of St Andrew's Cathedral, remained Tractarian.

William Carr Smith saw the continuation of High Church practices at St James' as a way of maintaining the church's unique identity, at a time when Sydney was growing rapidly as a commercial centre, and the parish congregation was greatly diminishing. St James' Church was, as it remains, dependent upon a congregation that is prepared to travel from the surrounding suburbs to worship in a traditional style of liturgy that is offered in few of Sydney's churches.

In keeping with the High Church ritual, Carr Smith had the interior of the church transformed by the architect John H. Buckeridge. Box pews and galleries were removed. An eastern apse and raised chancel were created at the eastern end, with an ornately tiled floor and brass enclosure. The visual focus of the building, and the focus of the liturgy, changed from the pulpit to the communion table and the sacrament of the Eucharist. In reference to the discussions about the changes, Carr Smith is quoted as saying:

If it was decided to leave the church as it is, we might just as well turn it into a museum at once, and charge 6d a head admission but if we want a church for its legitimate purpose, as a place of worship, we must study the convenience of the worshippers. Many persons desire to watch the preacher's delivery, and naturally see no reason why for all time they should have to sit with their backs to the pulpit. However, nothing of any personal or historic interest will be lost, and wherever possible the original material will be re-used.

The new chancel made room for a robed choir and eucharistic vestments. Pictorial stained glass windows were ordered from England from Percy Bacon Brothers. All these changes, and the Anglo-Catholic style of worship adopted at St James', were in direct conflict with the Evangelical ideals and Low Church practices that were increasingly prevalent in the Sydney Diocese. People came from Sydney's suburbs "by tram and ferry" to enjoy the style of worship provided by St James' King Street.

== Ministry ==
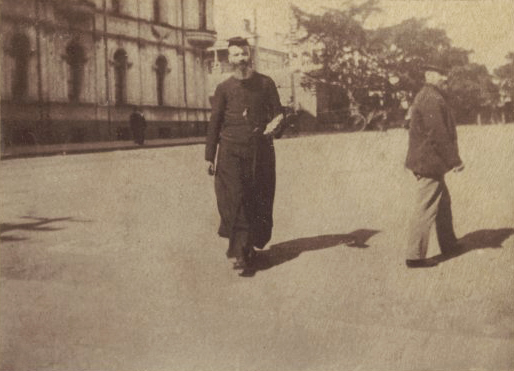
Rev. William Carr Smith, walking in the streets of Sydney

Carr Smith was an enthusiastic preacher known for his "impassioned oratory", and for being "never without a large congregation", despite the fact that his sermons were long. One of them, lasting an hour and a half, drew crowds until there was standing room only. He claimed that "great subjects ought to be dealt with as great subjects, and that they could not receive the attention they deserved if they were discussed in a time-or-trouble-grudging spirit."

He was known for his charitable works and for taking his ministry directly to the poor of the city, aided by Sister Freda, of the Sisters of the Church. On Sunday afternoons he preached in the open air to the crowd in the Sydney's Domain, which lay within the boundaries of the parish. To facilitate the church's outreach, a church hall was built to the design of Burcham Clamp, and a number of societies were formed, particularly to aid the men of the city. At Christmas time in 1907, the Sunday Times published a sermon by Carr Smith written especially for the newspaper.

== Other roles and community engagement ==
As well as his work in St James', Carr Smith was chaplain to the Governor of New South Wales, Earl Beauchamp, from 1899 to 1900, worked with the Sisters of the Church, became the Chaplain to Sydney Hospital from 1899 to 1919, and was a fellow of St. Paul's College from 1897 to 1900. He was also a Commissioner to New Guinea in 1910.

He joined the Christian Socialist Union, was involved in labour reforms, and was among a number of churchmen who supported political equality and suffrage for women on the basis that they were equal to men. He was a member of a deputation from the Womanhood Suffrage League (founded 1891) to George Reid that was "encouragingly received" in 1898.

Beyond preaching and community work, he gave popular lectures on secular subjects such as "Egypt, Palestine, Russia, and Constantinople".

== Returns to England ==
Carr Smith took leave of absence in 1906 and returned to England with his sister, making the journey via Japan and the United States. On the occasions of both this departure and the one in 1909, affectionate and appreciative words were written about him in the press.

However, his socialist views were in opposition to most of Sydney's right-wing Anglicans, including members of his own congregation and he himself was discouraged by "the prevalence of the non-religious spirit". Both he and his congregation were moved by his farewell sermon delivered on Sunday 25 April 1909. In 1910 he resigned from St James'"after one of the most constructive ministries in the history of the diocese".

In England, Carr Smith accepted the parish of St Wulfram's Church, Grantham in Lincolnshire, where he became a canon of Lincoln Cathedral. From 1917 he served at Eastbourne, then at Forty Hill, as rector and rural dean. In 1924 he returned to St James' Sydney as locum tenens. On the eve of his final 1924 departure for England, a presentation by the Australian Industrial Christian Fellowship was made to him in the Sydney Domain where he had often preached.

He died on 3 July 1930 and is buried at Bromley, Kent.

== See also ==
- Robert Allwood
- Richard Hill (priest)
- Richard Hurford
- Philip Arthur Micklem
