= Chris Cottrell =

American entrepreneur

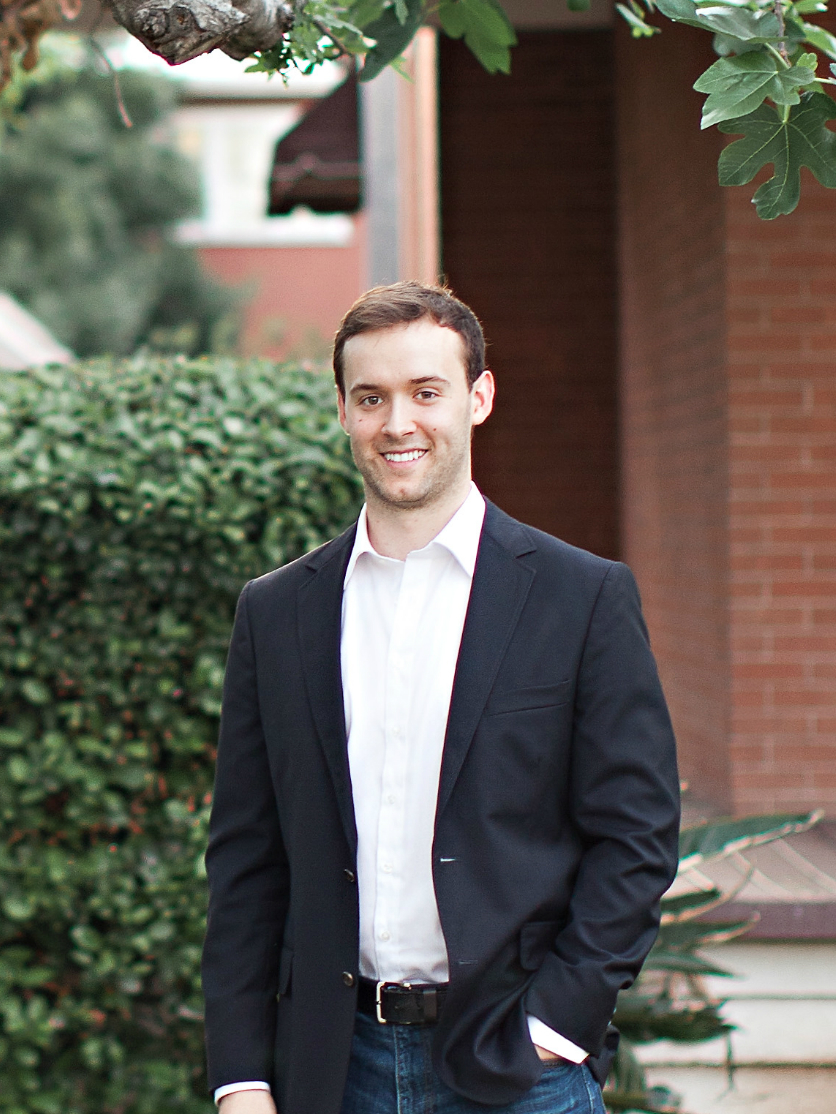
- Born: August 8, 1988 (age 38)
- Education: Arizona State University (BS) Georgetown University (MBA) Harvard University (MPA)

Chris Cottrell is the author of Chris's Law.

== Early life and education ==
Cottrell was born in Milwaukee, Wisconsin and grew up in Ohio and Texas before his family moved to Arizona.

At the age of twelve, Cottrell persuaded then-Senator Dean Martin to introduce an idea for legislation as part of a homework project for a student legislature. Senator Martin introduced the bill as "Chris's Law," along with an amendment to the Arizona Constitution, to keep accused sexual offenders from posting bail and establish a boundary around Arizona schools so convicted sexual offenders could not live nearby.

The bill was introduced to the Arizona State Senate in 2002 by Senator Dean Martin and passed the Judiciary Committee and the Senate. The Arizona House of Representatives voted in favor of the bill a month later and it was signed into law by Governor Jane Dee Hull on May 17, 2002. Proposition 103, the constitutional amendment accompanying the bill, was on the Arizona ballot in November 2002 and passed with 80.4% of the vote, one of the most popular ballot measures in Arizona history.
