= Ligon, Georgia =

American ghost town

Coordinates: 34°10′15″N 85°00′25″W

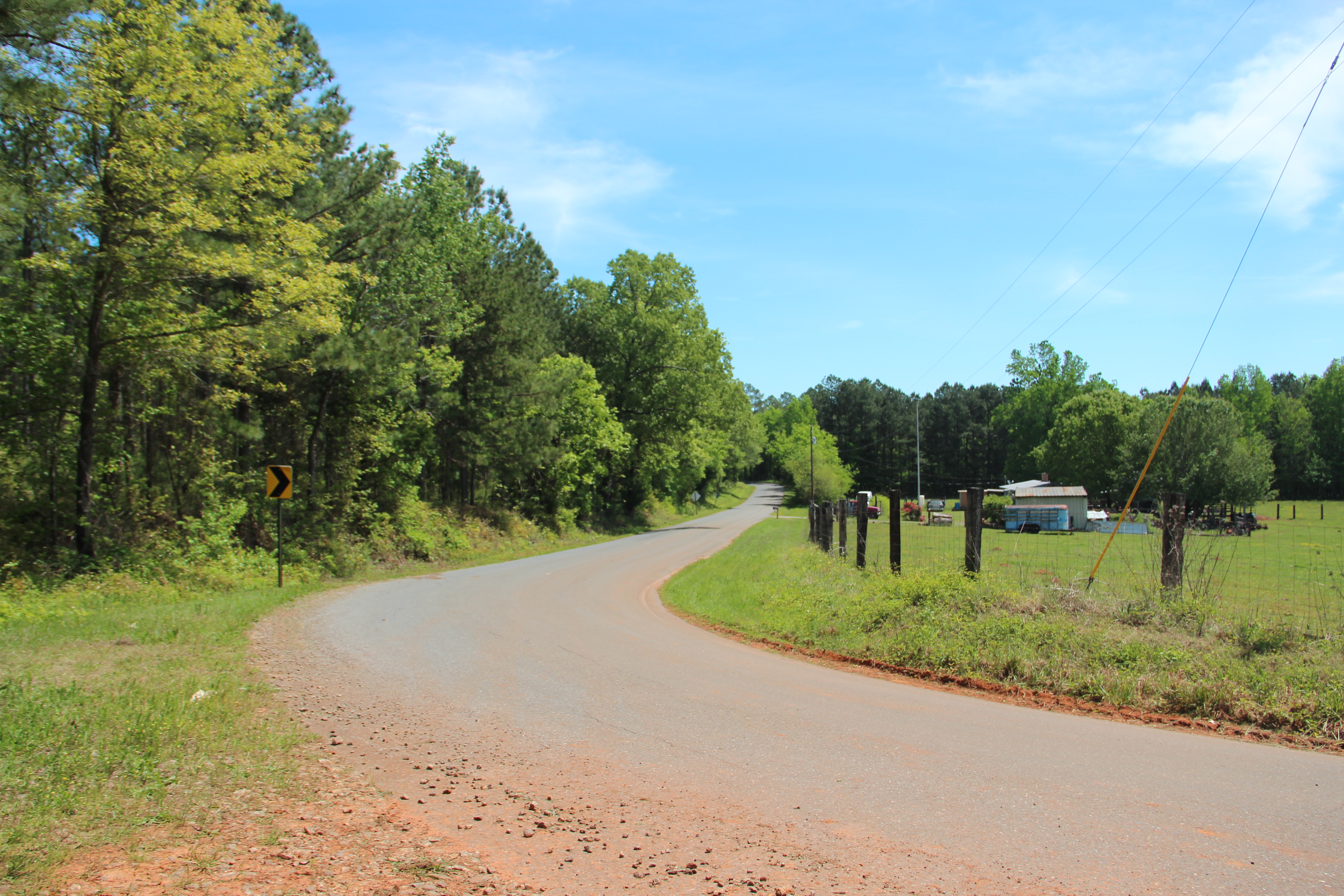
Hodges Mine Road in Ligon

Ligon is a ghost town in Bartow County, in the U.S. state of Georgia.

== History ==
A post office called Ligon was established in 1888, and remained in operation until it was discontinued in 1902. The community was named for James Oliver Ligon, a settler.
