= Thomas Dunne (Lord Lieutenant) =

British military officer (1933–2025)

Sir Thomas Raymond Dunne, KG, KCVO, JP (24 October 1933 – 6 January 2025) was a British military officer who was Lord Lieutenant of Hereford and Worcester, serving from 1977, then (after the historic counties were restored) from 1998 he was the lord lieutenant of Worcestershire until 2001 and the lord lieutenant of Herefordshire until 2008.

== Biography ==
Dunne was born on 24 October 1933, the son of Philip Russell Rendel Dunne, a military officer and politician. He was educated at Ludgrove School and Eton. He then entered Sandhurst, where he was commissioned into the Royal Horse Guards in 1951, later serving in both Germany and Cyprus.

He left the military in 1959 to manage his family estate, Gatley Park. In 1977, Dunne was appointed Lord Lieutenant of Hereford and Worcester, three years after the administrative counties of Herefordshire and Worcestershire were merged to form Hereford and Worcester.

In the 1995 New Year Honours, he was appointed Knight Commander of the Royal Victorian Order (KCVO). In 1998, Hereford and Worcester reverted to its original counties, and Sir Thomas became Lord Lieutenant of Herefordshire and Lord Lieutenant of Worcestershire. He retired from the latter on 31 July 2001. He was Chairman of the Association of Lord-Lieutenants. In 2008, he was appointed Knight Companion of the Order of the Garter (KG).

Dunne married Henrietta Rose Crawley, daughter of Cosmo Stafford Crawley. He died on 6 January 2025, at the age of 91.

== Family ==
Sir Thomas was the father of:

- Camilla Rose Dunne, married to the Hon. Rupert Soames (son of Christopher Soames, Baron Soames and Mary Churchill, and a grandson of Sir Winston Churchill) in 1988
- Philip Martin Dunne, Conservative MP for Ludlow from 2005 to 2024
- Letitia Dunne
- Nicholas Dunne, married to Lady Jasmine Cavendish, daughter of Peregrine Cavendish, 12th Duke of Devonshire

== Arms ==
Coat of arms of Thomas Dunne
| Notes Knight Companion of the Order of the Garter since 2008. Crest Upon a helm with a wreath of the colours, a rose Or the stalk Sable entwining and encircling a cluster of snakes' heads upwards Or'. Torse Mantling Or and Sable. Escutcheon Sable a wolf rampant holding between the forepaws a bottle Or the label Sable on a chief dancetty of three points downwards Or two pears bendwise slipped and leaved Sable. Orders The Order of the Garter circlet. Banner The banner of Sir Thomas Dunne's arms used as Knight Companion of the Garter depicted at St George's Chapel. |

Honorary titles
| Preceded by John Francis Maclean | Lord Lieutenant of Hereford and Worcester; 1977–1998 | Succeeded by Office abolished |
| Preceded by Office restored | Lord Lieutenant of Herefordshire; 1998–2008 | Succeeded by The Countess of Darnley |
| Preceded by Office restored | Lord Lieutenant of Worcestershire; 1998–2001 | Succeeded by Michael Brinton |
