= Harry Cotterell =

Harry Cotterell (30 December 1841 – September 1923) was a British trader who was chairman of African Association Ltd, an amalgamation of 8 British merchant firms operating in the Oil Rivers Protectorate.

== Background ==
Born in 1841 in Newbury, Berkshire before relocating to Liverpool with his family aged 9, Cotterell came from modest means and had little education. At the age ten, he began work at a succession of jobs, before becoming a cabin boy, crossing the Atlantic several times. In January 1863, he was a cabin steward on a ship that was owned by a Liverpool merchant firm which was leaving for Oil Rivers. At Oil Rivers, he persuaded the local agent of the Liverpool firm to retain him at Bonny. After spending three years at Bonny, Cotterell was earning income with a share of profits, he also had some success singing at parties. He became an independent trader with trade activities largely centered in the towns of Bonny, Calabar and Old Calabar. In the Oil Rivers, he was head of a committee that settled trade disputes and also processed incoming and outgoing mails.

In 1881, Cotterell founded Holt and Cotterell, a partnership with John Holt to operate from the assets of Irvine and Woodward, a small firm which was unable to continue to trade in West Africa. In 1889, Cotterell and Holt entered into an agreement with a few other palm oil traders to form African Association Ltd. The new venture started out poorly and Cotterell and Holt later had disagreements about the direction of the company with Holt leaving the company in 1896.

Accounts of his activities in West Africa can be found in the book Trading in West Africa edited by Peter Davies.
