= Arthur Cottrell =

American football coach (1885–1918)

Biographical details
- Born: January 6, 1885; Ashaway, Rhode Island, U.S.
- Died: October 12, 1918 (aged 33); Garden City, New York, U.S.
- Education: Cornell (1907)

Coaching career (HC unless noted)
- 1909: Western Maryland
- 1910: Alfred
- 1911: Millersville

Head coaching record
- Overall: 9–7–1

Arthur Montrose Cottrell (January 6, 1885 – October 12, 1918) was an American football coach and a World War I veteran. He served as the head football coach at McDaniel College–then known as Western Maryland College–in 1909, at Alfred University in 1910, and at Millersville University of Pennsylvania in 1911, compiling a career college football coaching record of 9–7–1.

Cottrell died in 1918 from the Spanish flu while stationed at Mitchel Field during World War I.

== Head coaching record ==
Year	Team	Overall	Conference	Standing	Bowl/playoffs
Western Maryland Green Terror (Independent) (1909)
1909	McDaniel	7–2–1			
McDaniel:		7–2–1			
Alfred Saxons (Independent) (1910)
1910	Alfred	2–3			
Alfred:		2–3			
Millersville Marauders (Independent) (1911)
1911	Millersville	0–2			
Millersville:		0–2			
Total:		9–7–1			
