= Susan Bligh, Countess of Darnley =

British noble

Susan Elaine Bligh, Countess of Darnley, CVO, CStJ, is the former Lord Lieutenant of Herefordshire, having been appointed to the position on 24 October 2008.

Along with her husband Lord Darnley, Lady Darnley has been a farmer and landowner in Herefordshire for many years. She has also held a number of public positions. She served as a magistrate between 1977 and 2005, taking particular interest in the Family Panel, of which she was chair prior to her retirement. She was also a member of the Hereford and Worcester Probation Committee, and its chair and National Representative for five years, as well as being Vice Chair of the Worcestershire Ethics and Standards Committee. She was made a Deputy Lieutenant for Worcestershire in 2000, before being appointed as Lord Lieutenant of Herefordshire upon the retirement of her predecessor, Sir Thomas Dunne in 2008.

As well as her roles in public office, Lady Darnley is a member of the Hereford Diocesan Synod and serves on the Bishop's Council, the Council for Social Responsibility and on Hereford Cathedral Council. She is also an Appeal Patron for Hereford's Royal National College for the Blind.

She was appointed Commander of the Royal Victorian Order (CVO) in the 2019 Birthday Honours.

Honorary titles
| Preceded by Sir Thomas Dunne | Lord Lieutenant of Herefordshire; 2008–Present | Succeeded by Incumbent |
