= John Hungerford Arkwright =

- Born: 12 July 1833
- Died: 25 May 1905 (aged 71)
- Occupation: Lord Lieutenant of Herefordshire

John Hungerford Arkwright (12 July 1833 – 25 May 1905) was Lord Lieutenant of Herefordshire from 27 January 1902 to 5 December 1904, and was one of the wealthiest landowners in that county.

== Biography ==
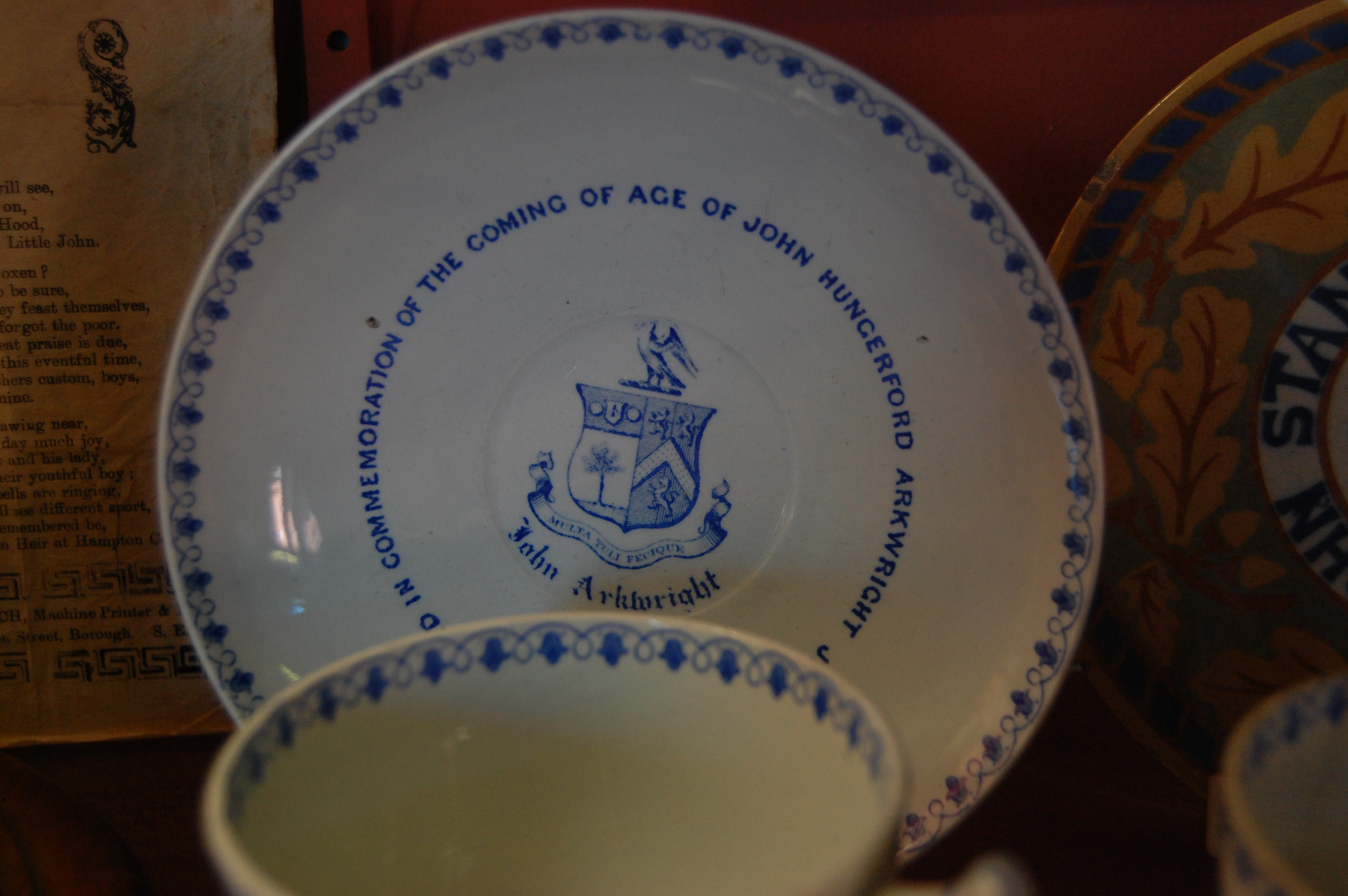
Cup and saucer commemorating Arkwright's coming of age (21st birthday) in 1854, displayed in Leominster Museum

Arkwright was born at the family home, Hampton Court, near Leominster, in Herefordshire, England, on 12 July 1833. He was the eldest son of John Arkwright Esq. and Sarah, who was the eldest daughter of Sir Hungerford Hoskyns Bart.

He was educated at Eton College and studied at Christ Church, Oxford. At the age of 25, he inherited the Hampton Court Estate, on his father's death, in 1858.

Arkwright also served as a Justice of the Peace.

He died on 25 May 1905.

== Philanthropy ==
When the Leominster market hall, Grange Court, was dismantled and stored in the mid-1850s, Arkwright purchased it at auction, then offered the building to the council if they would re-erect it. When they refused, he moved the building himself and rebuilt it near the Priory Church in 1859. Subsequently, acquired by compulsory purchase, the building remains in local government use.

== Family ==
Arkwright was the great-grandson of the cotton-spinning industrialist Sir Richard Arkwright. His younger brother was Richard Arkwright, a barrister and Member of Parliament (MP) for Leominster.

Arkwright's only son, Sir John Stanhope Arkwright, was elected as MP for Hereford, at the 1900 general election, and remained so until his resignation in 1912. Arkwright also had three daughters, Geraldine Mary Rose, Evelyn Lucy Alice, and Olive Katharine Mary.

== Legacy ==
Arkwright's papers relating to the Hampton Court Estate are in the Herefordshire Record Office. His portrait in oil, by Frederick Samuel Beaumont in 1906, is in the collection of Herefordshire County Council.
