= Chris Pyemont =

English cricketer and educator

Personal information
- Full name: Christopher Patrick Pyemont
- Born: 4 January 1948; Etchingham, Sussex, England
- Died: 4 May 2017 (aged 69); Eastbourne, Sussex, England
- Batting: Right-handed
- Bowling: Slow left-arm orthodox
- Relatives: James Pyemont (son); Neil Lenham (son-in-law)

Domestic team information
- Years: Team
- 1967: Cambridge University

Career statistics
Competition	First-class
Matches	14
Runs scored	516
Batting average	22.43
100s/50s	–/2
Top score	61
Balls bowled	173
Wickets	3
Bowling average	27.66
5 wickets in innings	–
10 wickets in match	–
Best bowling	2/7
Catches/stumpings	1/–
- Source: Cricinfo, 11 January 2022

Christopher Patrick Pyemont (17 January 1948 — 4 May 2017) was an English first-class cricketer and educator.

Pyemont was born in the Sussex village of Etchingham in January 1948. He was educated at Marlborough College, before going up to Magdalene College, Cambridge. While studying at Cambridge, he played first-class cricket for Cambridge University Cricket Club in 1967, making fourteen appearances. Playing as a batsman in the Cambridge side, scored 516 runs at an average of 22.43, recording two half centuries and a highest score of 61. A talented sportsman at Cambridge, he gained blue's in cricket, hockey, skiing and rackets.

After graduating from Cambridge, he was a direct entry into the Royal Armoured Corps as a second lieutenant in February 1968. His commission lasted until February 1976, when he relinquished his commission. After leaving the military, Pyemont began a career in teaching. He was appointed to Bede's School in Eastbourne as a maths and games teacher in 1981. His brother, Peter, had been head of the school since 1964. For several years he ran both the boy's and girl's boarding houses. He succeeded his brother as headmaster in 1998, where he oversaw modernisation of the school's facilities. He stood down as headmaster in 2007, but continued to teach maths and games. Pyemont died in May 2017, following a long battle with cancer. His son, James, who also a first-class cricketer, as was his son-in-law Neil Lenham.
