= Myron Cottrell =

American businessman

Myron Cottrell was the founder and owner of TPI Specialties, an automobile parts manufacturer, and Cottrell Racing Engines, a machine shop and engine building shop. He is also active in automobile racing, collecting, and restoration.

== Business career ==
=== Early career ===
According to the TPI Specialties' official website, Cottrell was an engine builder for twenty years prior to founding the TPIS.

=== With TPI Specialties ===
In 1985 Cottrell bought a new Chevrolet Corvette and was intrigued to learn how its Tuned Port Injection system worked. After determining that the system could be improved significantly, Cottrell established his company, TPI Specialties, and began building and marketing aftermarket parts kits for hot rodders. Today TPIS is still owned by Cottrell. The company owns numerous patents and is frequently cited as technical authority in such publications as Hot Rod Magazine and Car Craft magazine.

== Personal life ==
Cottrell resided in Chaska, Minnesota. Myron died at the age of 75 on Dec 29th, 2017.

== Automobile racing and collecting ==
Cottrell is involved in sports car racing. In addition, he has bought and restored or modified a number of notable automobiles. Cars which Cottrell owns or formerly owned include the following:

- 1979 AMC Spirit AMX, class winner in the 1979 24 Hours Nürburgring and the first American car ever to finish the event.
- The Kurtis-Chevy "Zidar Special," a circa mid-50s 2-seat sportscar with a 321 cid Hilborn-injected Chevrolet smallblock V8.

== Related ==
Myron Cottrell’s brother, John Cottrell, bought a 1999 Chevrolet Monte Carlo NASCAR Busch Series race car and modified it to make it street legal. In 2006 the car received an appreciative mention from Car Craft Magazine after appearing at the Car Craft Summer Nationals auto show, and in 2006 it was run at Bonneville Speedway on the Bonneville Salt Flats and achieved a best official speed of 198.155 miles per hour.
