= Herefordshire Archive and Records Centre =

Coordinates: 52.0386°N 2.6874°W

Herefordshire Archive and Records Centre holds the archives for the county of Herefordshire. The archives are held at Fir Tree Lane, Rotherwas, Hereford and run by Herefordshire Council.
