= Sir Terence Falkiner, 8th Baronet =

English soldier

Lt.-Col. Sir Terence Edmond Patrick Falkiner, 8th Baronet DL KStJ (17 March 1903 – 19 February 1987) was an English soldier.

== Early life ==
Lt.-Col. Sir Terence Edmond Patrick Falkiner, 8th Bt. was born on 17 March 1903. He was the son of Sir Leslie Falkiner, 7th Baronet and Kathleen Mary Orde-Powlett. Among his siblings were Naomi Elaine Mary Falkiner, a nun, Capt. Lucien Leslie Falkiner (who married Hon. Lucy Verney-Cave, a daughter of the 6th Baron Braye) who was killed in action during World War II, and Maj. Gervase Leslie Falkiner (who married Rosemary Florence Emily Smith), who fought and was wounded in the War. Before his parents' marriage, his father was married to Elaine Maynard Farmer, daughter of William Mortimer Maynard Farmer, who died in 1900.

His paternal grandparents were Sir Samuel Falkiner, 6th Baronet and the former Blanche Call (a daughter of Sir William Call, 3rd Baronet). His maternal grandparents were Hon. Henry Robert Orde-Powlett (a son of William Orde-Powlett, 3rd Baron Bolton of Bolton Castle) and the former Henrietta Cathcart de Trafford (a granddaughter of Sir Thomas de Trafford, 1st Baronet and Charles Cathcart, 2nd Earl Cathcart).

He was educated at Oratory School, Birmingham.

== Career ==
He gained the rank of Lieutenant-Colonel in the Coldstream Guards. He fought in the British Army during World War II, where he was wounded. He was Assistant Military Secretary of the Eastern Command at Hounslow from 1948 to 1951 before becoming the Assistant Military Secretary of the Southern Command at Fugglestone St Peter from 1951 to 1955. He retired in 1956.

He succeeded as the 8th Baronet Falkiner, of Anne Mount, in the County of Cork, following the death of his father on 19 January 1917. His residence was Thornhaugh, Peterborough. He served as Deputy Lieutenant of Herefordshire in 1965. He was appointed a Knight of Order of Saint John.

== Personal life ==
On 29 September 1925, he married Mildred Katharine Cotterell at Brompton Oratory, London. Mildred was the youngest daughter of Sir John Cotterell, 4th Baronet and Lady Evelyn Amy Gordon-Lennox (the eldest daughter of Charles Gordon-Lennox, 7th Duke of Richmond and the former Amy Mary Ricardo). Together, they were the parents of:

- Elizabeth Anne Thérèse Falkiner (1929-2023), an author who married Sir Michael Hogg, 8th Baronet, son of Sir Arthur Hogg, 7th Baronet, in 1956.
- Mary Clare Falkiner (1934-2018), who married Noel John Taylor, son of Charles Taylor, in 1956. They divorced in 1980 and she married Geoffrey Smith, son of William Smith, in 1991.
- Veronica Cicely Falkiner (b. 1935), who married William David Brown, son of William Moir Brown, in 1956.
- Sir Edmond Charles Falkiner, 9th Baronet (1938–1997), who married Janet Iris Darby, daughter of Arthur Edward Bruce Darby, in 1960. They divorced in 1996 and he married Diana Jean Childs, daughter of Percy Arthur Childs, in 1997.
- Henry Leslie Basil Falkiner (1940–2003), who married Dorothea Angela Wolfe-Taylor, daughter of Peter Wolfe-Taylor, in 1967.

He died on 19 February 1987 at age 83. After his death, his widow wished to be known as Mildred, Lady Falkiner.

Baronetage of Ireland
Preceded by Leslie Edmund Percy Riggs Falkiner	Baronet (of Anne Mount); 1917–1987	Succeeded by Edmond Charles Falkiner
