= Byford =

Village and civil parish in Herefordshire, England

Coordinates: 52.081°N 2.882°W

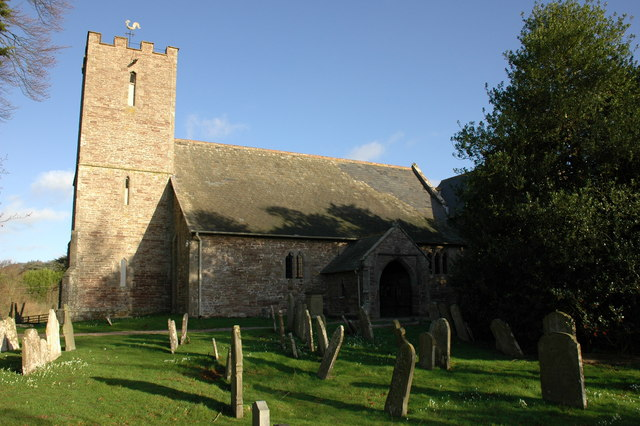
St John the Baptist church

Byford is a village and civil parish on the River Wye in Herefordshire, England, about 11 km (7 mi) west of Hereford. According to the 2001 census, it had a population of 119, increasing to 201 at the 2011 census.

Offa's Dyke runs along Garnons Hill, to the north of the village. The 11th-century church of St John the Baptist is a Grade I listed building.
