= Cotterell baronets =

Baronetcy in the Baronetage of the United Kingdom

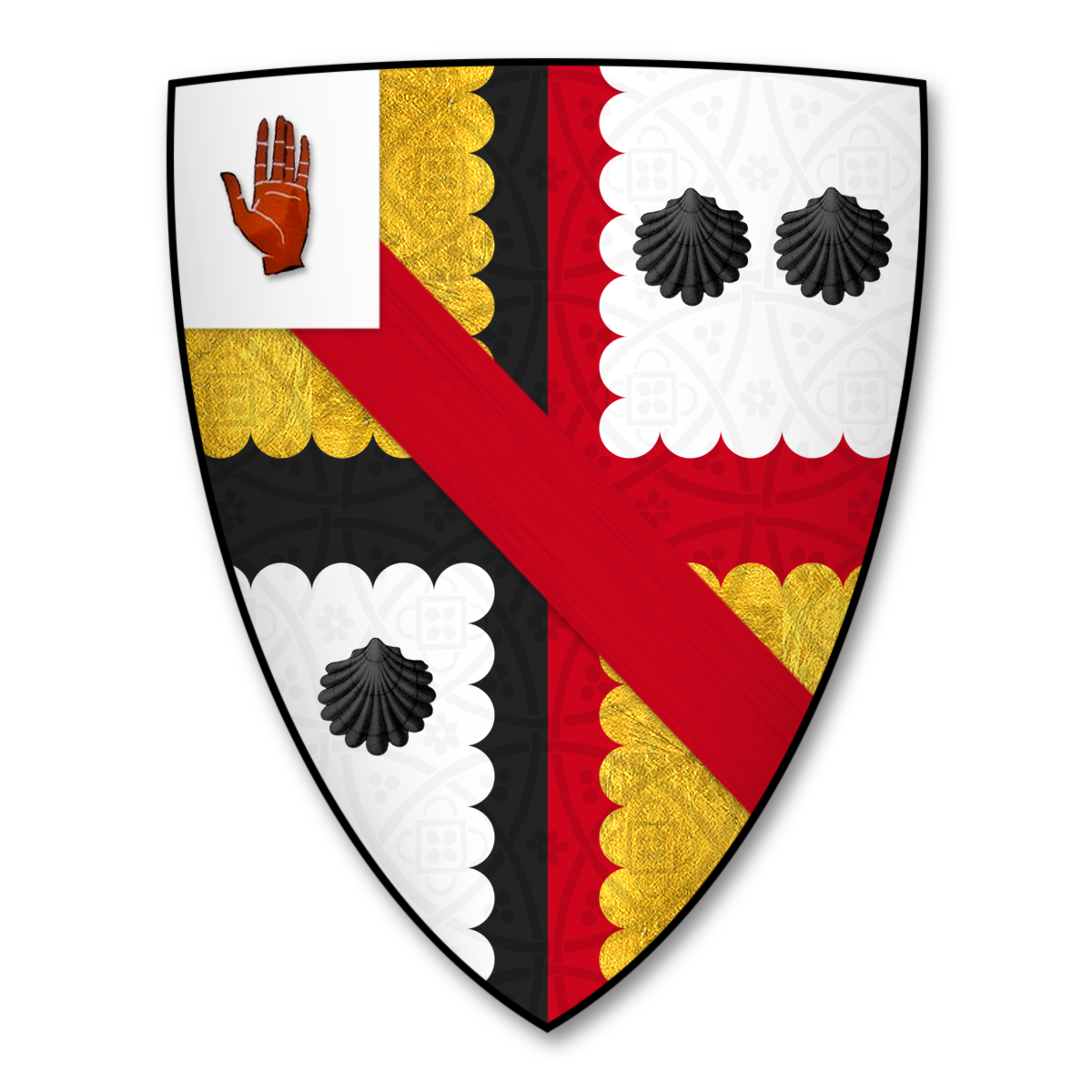
Escutcheon of the Cotterell baronets of Garnons

The Cotterell baronetcy, of Garnons in the County of Hereford, is a title in the Baronetage of the United Kingdom. It was created on 2 November 1805 for John Cotterell, Member of Parliament for Herefordshire for many years. The third Baronet also represented this constituency in the House of Commons. The fourth Baronet was Lord-Lieutenant of Herefordshire.

== Cotterell baronets, of Garnons (1805) ==
- Sir John Geers Cotterell, 1st Baronet (1757–1845)
- Sir John Henry Cotterell, 2nd Baronet (1830–1847)
- Sir Geers Henry Cotterell, 3rd Baronet (1834–1900)
- Sir John Richard Geers Cotterell, 4th Baronet (1866–1937)
- Sir Richard Charles Geers Cotterell, CBE, 5th Baronet (1907–1978)
- Sir John Henry Geers Cotterell, 6th Baronet (1935–2017)
- Sir Henry Richard Geers Cotterell, 7th Baronet (born 1961)

The heir apparent is the present holder's son Richard John Geers Cotterell (born 1990).

== Notes ==
Baronetage of the United Kingdom
Preceded by Lopes baronets	Cotterell baronets of Garnons; 2 November 1805	Succeeded by Hillary baronets
