= Lady Lettice Lygon =

English socialite (1906–1973)

Lettice Lygon
- Lady Cotterell
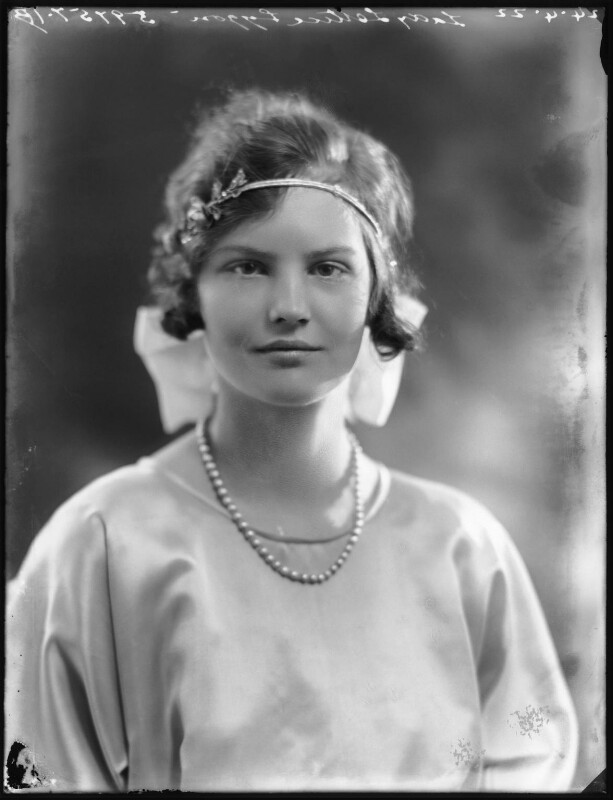
- Lady Lettice Cotterell (née Lygon), by Bassano Ltd, 1922
- Born: 16 June 1906
- Died: 18 July 1973 (aged 67)
- Noble family: Lygon
- Spouse: Sir Richard Charles Cotterell, 5th Baronet (m. 1930; div. 1958)
- Issue: Rose Evelyn Cotterell; Anne Lettice Cotterell; Sir John Henry Cotterell, 6th Baronet
- Father: William Lygon, 7th Earl Beauchamp
- Mother: Lady Lettice Mary Elizabeth Grosvenor
- Occupation: Socialite

Lady Lettice Lygon (16 June 1906 – 18 July 1973) was an English socialite and aristocrat who was one of the Bright Young Things.

== Early life ==
Lady Lettice Lygon was born on 16 June 1906, the daughter of William Lygon, 7th Earl Beauchamp and Lady Lettice Mary Elizabeth Grosvenor, a daughter of Victor Grosvenor, Earl Grosvenor.

== Bright Young Things ==
Lady Lettice Lygon was "one of the tallest and prettiest members of the younger set". She was "the tallest débutante of her year". She was a friend of Daphne Fielding.

In 1931, Lady Lettice's portrait was painted by Philip de László. In the portrait, she is seated "Seated half-length slightly to the right, head turned in three-quarter profile to the left, wearing a pale off the shoulder evening gown, with a chiffon stole round her shoulders, her left elbow resting on the arm of the sofa with her hand raised to her neck, holding a string of pearls in her right hand resting on a blue stole in her lap".

== Personal life ==
On 16 June 1930 she married Sir Richard Charles Geers Cotterell, 5th Baronet (1907–1978), the only son of Sir John Cotterell, 4th Baronet and his wife, Lady Evelyn Amy Gordon-Lennox (the eldest daughter of the former Amy Gordon-Lennox, Countess of March and Charles Gordon-Lennox, 7th Duke of Richmond). Before their divorce in 1958, they had four children:

- Rose Evelyn Cotterell (1932–2006), who married Charles Hambro, Baron Hambro, heir to the Hambros Bank fortune.
- Anne Lettice Cotterell (b. 1933)
- Sir John Henry Geers Cotterell, 6th Baronet (1935–2017), who married Alexandra Bridgewater in 1959.
- Thomas Richard Geers Cotterell (b. 1939).

They divorced in 1958. Later that same year, Richard married Hon. Molly Patricia Berry, daughter of William Berry, 1st Viscount Camrose.

She died on 18 July 1973 aged 67.
