= Lady Mary Lygon =

- Princess Romanovsky-Pavlovsky
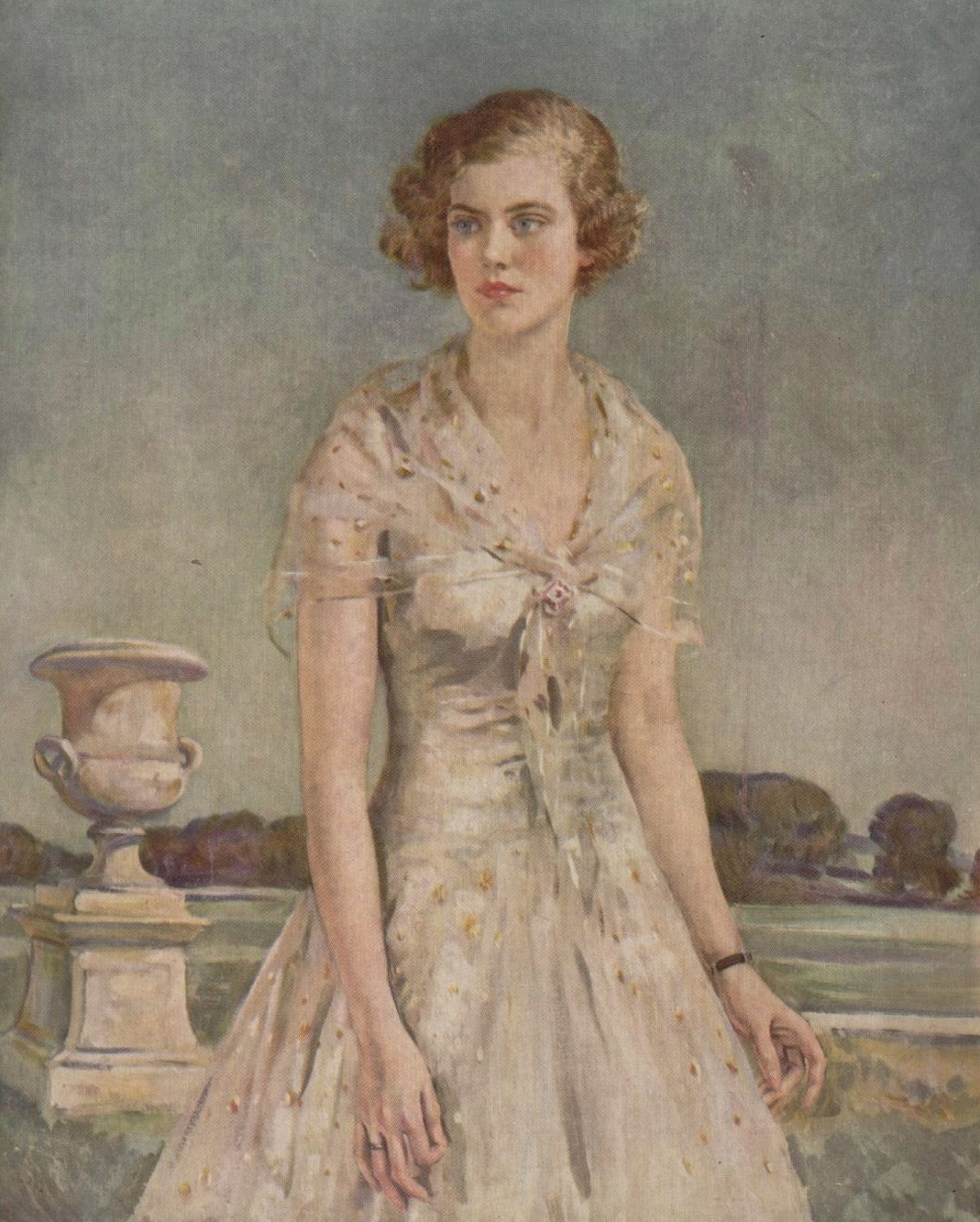
- Lady Mary Lygon by William Ranken, 1928
- Born: 12 February 1910; Madresfield Court, Worcestershire, England
- Died: 27 September 1982 (aged 72); Faringdon, Oxfordshire, England
- Spouse: Prince Vsevolod Ivanovich of Russia (m. 1939; div. 1956)
- Noble family: Lygon
- Father: William Lygon, 7th Earl Beauchamp
- Mother: Lady Lettice Grosvenor

Lady Mary Lygon (formerly Princess Romanovsky-Pavlovsky; 12 February 1910 – 27 September 1982), known as Maimie, was a British aristocrat and Russian princess by marriage.

== Royal match failure ==
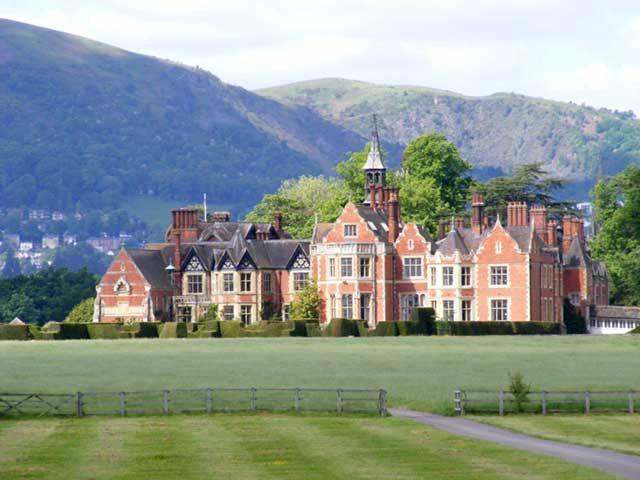
Madresfield Court

Lady Mary Lygon was born at Madresfield Court in Malvern, Worcestershire; the fifth of seven children, and third daughter, of Lord William Lygon, 7th Earl Beauchamp and Lady Lettice Lygon (née Grosvenor), Countess Beauchamp.

In June 1930, Lady Mary began dating Prince George and seemed set to be engaged to him. However, her parents' marriage fell apart when Lord Beauchamp's homosexual relationships were publicly revealed by Lady Beauchamp's brother, Hugh Grosvenor, Duke of Westminster, in 1931. The scandal ruined Lady Mary's chances of marrying the King's son. Lord Beauchamp then went into a self-imposed exile on the continent and Lady Beauchamp, claiming she was "always disliked and now hated by her daughters", left Madresfield Court and retired to her family estate of Eaton Hall, to live with her brother.

The tall, blond and blue-eyed Lady Mary, and her three sisters—called the Beauchamp Belles—were left in charge of Madresfield Court. Around this time, Lady Mary formed a close and long-lasting friendship with the author Evelyn Waugh, inspiring the character of Lady Julia Flyte in Brideshead Revisited.

== Imperial marriage ==
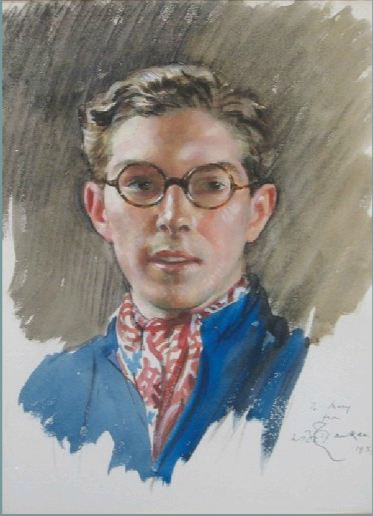
Prince Vsevolod Ivanovich of Russia by William Ranken, 1939

In the late 1930s, Lady Mary met Prince Vsevolod Ivanovich of Russia. Their engagement was announced on 1 February 1939. The wedding, which was attended by two of Lady Mary's sisters, two witnesses and a Russian priest, took place on 31 May 1939 in the Chelsea register office. A religious service was held the next day in a Russian Orthodox church on Buckingham Palace Road. Grand Duke Vladimir Kirillovich of Russia, head of the House of Romanov, created her Princess Romanovsky-Pavlovsky, with the style of Serene Highness, at her husband's request.

During the Second World War, the Princess ran a Red Cross unit called Princess Pavlovsky's Unit. The couple often entertained Yugoslavian diplomats—the Prince being first cousin of King Peter II. Childless, they were devoted to their Pekingese dogs.

Their marriage, however, began disintegrating in the 1950s. Both drank heavily, with the Princess eventually becoming a depressed alcoholic. According to her friends, the Prince had spent all her money, and they were completely broke by 1952; living together, but not speaking. They moved to Hove, Sussex, but the Prince left her following Christmas in 1953. The Princess' mental health declined rapidly throughout the next year.

In February 1956, the couple divorced on the grounds of Prince Vsevolod's adultery, and in 1957, she resumed the lifestyle she was accustomed to as the daughter of an earl, with the surname of Lygon.

She never remarried, nor recovered from alcoholism, and spent the rest of her life surrounded by her dogs. Lady Mary Lygon died in Faringdon, Oxfordshire, in 1982.
