= Sir John Cotterell, 1st Baronet =

British politician

John Cotterell
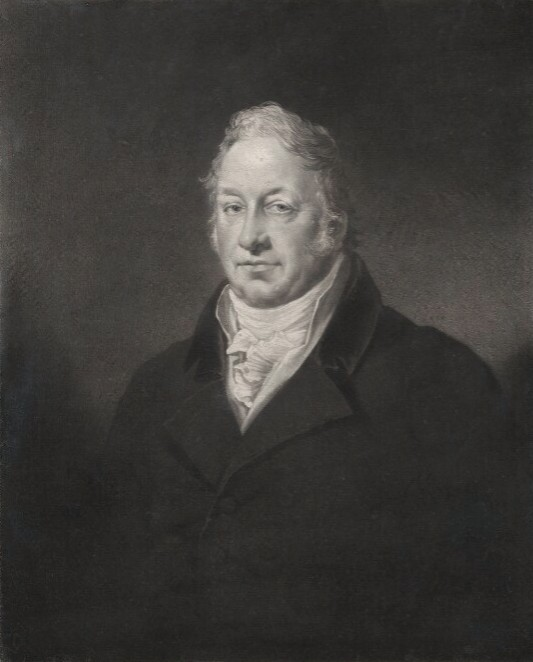

Member of Parliament for Herefordshire
- In office 1806–1831 Serving with Sir George Cornewall, Bt, Thomas Foley, Sir Robert Price, Bt
- Preceded by: Sir George Cornewall, Bt; John Matthews
- Succeeded by: Sir Robert Price, Bt; Kedgwin Hoskins
- In office 1802–1803 Serving with Sir George Cornewall, Bt
- Preceded by: Robert Biddulph; Thomas Harley
- Succeeded by: Sir George Cornewall, Bt; John Matthews

Personal details
- Born: John Geers Cotterell; 21 September 1757
- Died: 26 January 1845 (aged 87) Garnons, Herefordshire
- Party: Conservative
- Spouse: Frances Isabella Evans (m. 1791; died 1813)
- Parent(s): Sir John Brookes-Cotterell; Anne Geers

Sir John Geers Cotterell, 1st Baronet (21 September 1757 – 26 January 1845) was a British politician. He served as the Conservative Member of Parliament for Herefordshire from 1802 to 1803, and from 1806 to 1831.

== Early life ==
Cotterell was born on 21 September 1757. He was the son of Anne Geers and Sir John Brookes-Cotterell, High Sheriff of Herefordshire in 1761.

His paternal grandparents were John Cotterell and Mary (née Jackson) Cotterell. His mother was the daughter, and heiress, of John Geers of Garnons, Herefordshire.

== Career ==
Cotterell was known as an anti-Catholic Tory squire, or large landowner, in Hereford.

He served as the Conservative Member of Parliament for Herefordshire from 1802 to 1803, and from 1806 to 1831.

He was created Cotterell Baronet, of Garnons in the County of Hereford, on 2 November 1805 in the Baronetage of the United Kingdom.

== Personal life ==
On 4 January 1791, Cotterell married Frances Isabella Evans, daughter of Henry Michael Evans of Spring Grove, Uxbridge. Before her death on 3 July 1813, they were the parents of four sons and six daughters, including:

- Mary Cotterell (d. 1868), who married Thomas Taylor in 1820.
- Sarah Frances Cotterell (d. 1868), who married Newton Byron Hanson of Gilstead Hall, Pilgrims Hatch, in 1848.
- Caroline Cotterell (d. 1878), who married William Leigh of Roby Hall, Lancashire, 1828.
- John Henry Cotterell (1800–1834), who married Hon. Pyne Jesse Brand Trevor, daughter of Gen. Henry Trevor, 21st Baron Dacre, in 1828.
- Harriet Cotterell (1810–1891), who married Rev. Edwin Hotham, son of Sir William Hotham, in 1838.

Sir John died Garnons on 26 January 1845 was buried in the family vault at Mansel church. As he was predeceased by his eldest son, his grandson John succeeded to the baronetcy.

=== Descendants ===
Through his only son John, he was a grandfather of Sir John Cotterell, 2nd Baronet (1830–1847), who died unmarried while at Eton, and Sir Geers Cotterell, 3rd Baronet (1834–1900), who married Hon. Katherine Margaret Airey, daughter of Gen. Richard Airey, 1st Baron Airey with whom he had issue.

Parliament of the United Kingdom
Preceded by Robert Biddulph; Thomas Harley	Member of Parliament for Herefordshire; 1802–1803; With: Sir George Cornewall, Bt	Succeeded by Sir George Cornewall, Bt; John Matthews
Preceded by Sir George Cornewall, Bt; John Matthews	Member of Parliament for Herefordshire; 1806–1831; With: Sir George Cornewall, Bt; Thomas Foley; Sir Robert Price, Bt	Succeeded by Sir Robert Price, Bt; Kedgwin Hoskins
Baronetage of the United Kingdom
New creation	Baronet (of Garnons); 1805–1845	Succeeded by John Cotterell
