= William Lygon, 7th Earl Beauchamp =

British politician and peer (1872–1938)

The Right Honourable The Earl Beauchamp KG KCMG CB KStJ PC
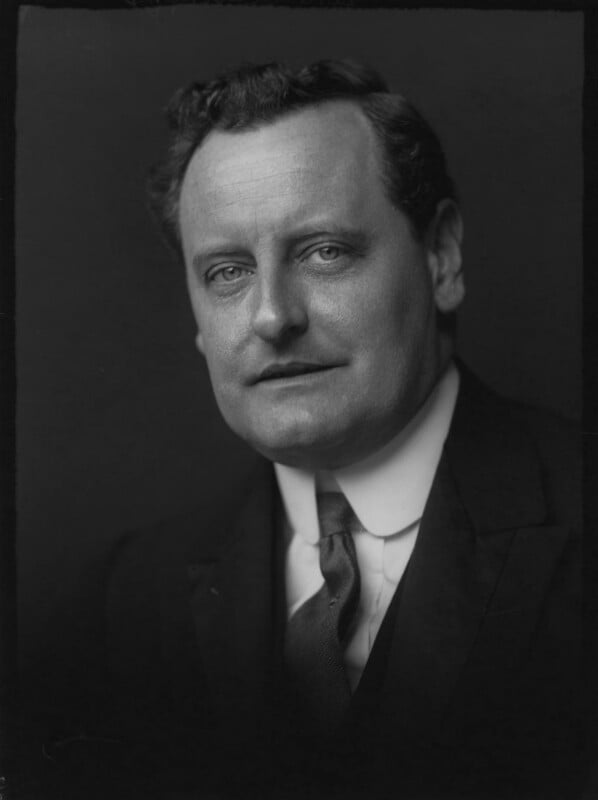
- Beauchamp in 1910

First Commissioner of Works
- In office 3 November 1910 – 6 August 1914
- Monarch: George V
- Prime Minister: H. H. Asquith
- Preceded by: Lewis Vernon Harcourt
- Succeeded by: The Lord Emmott

Lord President of the Council
- In office 16 June 1910 – 3 November 1910
- Monarch: George V
- Prime Minister: H. H. Asquith
- Preceded by: The Viscount Wolverhampton
- Succeeded by: The Viscount Morley of Blackburn
- In office 5 August 1914 – 25 May 1915
- Monarch: George V
- Prime Minister: H. H. Asquith
- Preceded by: The Viscount Morley of Blackburn
- Succeeded by: The Marquess of Crewe

Lord Steward of the Household
- In office 31 July 1907 – 16 June 1910
- Monarchs: Edward VII; George V
- Prime Minister: Sir Henry Campbell-Bannerman; H. H. Asquith
- Preceded by: The Earl of Liverpool
- Succeeded by: The Earl of Chesterfield

Captain of the Gentlemen-at-Arms
- In office 18 December 1905 – 31 July 1907
- Monarch: Edward VII
- Prime Minister: Sir Henry Campbell-Bannerman
- Preceded by: The Lord Belper
- Succeeded by: The Lord Denman

20th Governor of New South Wales
- In office 18 May 1899 – 30 April 1901
- Monarchs: Queen Victoria; Edward VII
- Preceded by: The Viscount Hampden
- Succeeded by: Harry Rawson

Personal details
- Born: 20 February 1872 London, England
- Died: 14 November 1938 (aged 66) New York City, New York, U.S.
- Party: Liberal
- Spouse: Lady Lettice Grosvenor (m. 1902; died 1936)
- Children: William Lygon, 8th Earl Beauchamp; Hon. Hugh Patrick Lygon; Lady Lettice Lygon; Lady Sibell Lygon; Lady Mary Lygon; Lady Dorothy Lygon; Hon. Richard Edward Lygon
- Parents: Frederick Lygon, 6th Earl Beauchamp (father); Lady Mary Stanhope (mother)
- Education: Christ Church, Oxford

William Lygon, 7th Earl Beauchamp (20 February 1872 – 14 November 1938), styled Viscount Elmley until 1891, was a British Liberal politician. He was Governor of New South Wales between 1899 and 1901, a member of the Liberal administrations of Sir Henry Campbell-Bannerman and H. H. Asquith between 1905 and 1915, and leader of the Liberal Party in the House of Lords between 1924 and 1931. When political enemies threatened to make his homosexuality public, he resigned from office to go into exile. Lord Beauchamp is generally considered to be the model for the character Lord Marchmain in Evelyn Waugh's novel Brideshead Revisited.

== Background and education ==
Beauchamp was the eldest son of Frederick Lygon, 6th Earl Beauchamp, by his first wife, Lady Mary Catherine, daughter of Philip Stanhope, 5th Earl Stanhope. He was educated at Eton College and then at Christ Church, Oxford, where he showed an interest in evangelism, joining the Christian Social Union. Beauchamp's mentors included the Eton master Henry Luxmoore, who encouraged his pupils to "strive after what was best in all things", and Anglican minister the Rev. James Adderley, who believed in practical Christianity and philanthropy in London's East End.

== Early career ==
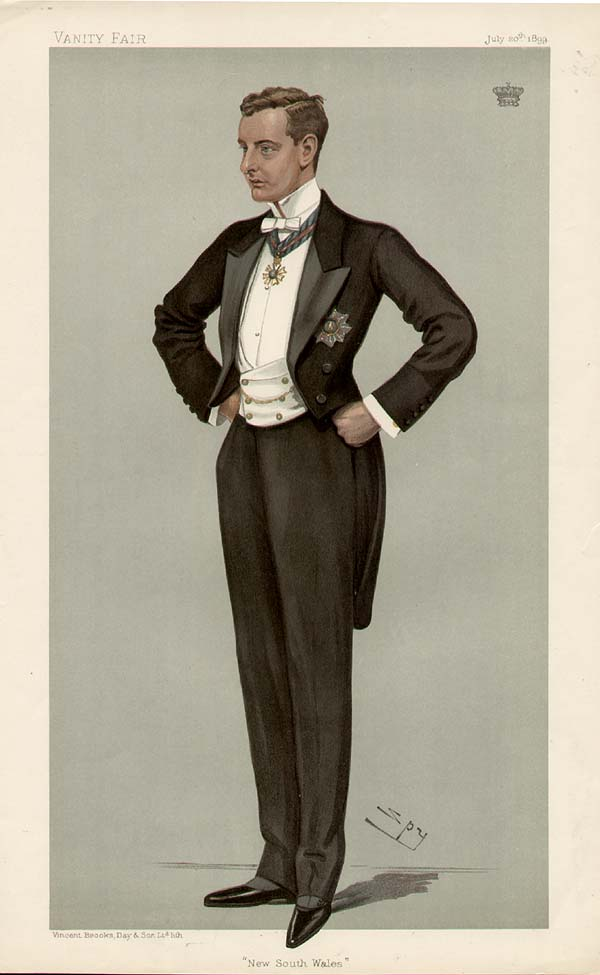
Beauchamp caricatured by Spy for Vanity Fair, 1899

Beauchamp succeeded his father in the earldom in 1891 at the age of 18, and was mayor of Worcester between 1895 and 1896. A progressive in his ideas, he was surprised to be offered the post of Governor of New South Wales in May 1899. Though he was good at the job and enjoyed the company of local artists and writers, he was unpopular in the colony for a series of gaffes and misunderstandings, most notably over his reference to the "birthstain" of Australia's convict origins. His open association with the high church and Anglo-Catholicism caused increased perturbation in the Evangelical Council.

In Sydney, William Carr Smith, rector of St James' Church was his chaplain. Beauchamp returned to Britain in 1900, saying that his duties had failed to stimulate him.

== Political career ==
In 1902, Beauchamp joined the Liberal Party, and also married Lady Lettice Mary Elizabeth Grosvenor, the daughter of Victor Grosvenor, Earl Grosvenor. When the Liberals came to power under Henry Campbell-Bannerman in December 1905, Beauchamp was appointed Captain of the Honourable Corps of Gentlemen-at-Arms and was sworn of the Privy Council in January 1906. In July 1907, he became Lord Steward of the Household, a post he retained when H. H. Asquith became Prime Minister in 1908. He entered the cabinet as Lord President of the Council in June 1910, a post he held until November of the same year, when he was appointed First Commissioner of Works.

Identified with the radical wing of the Liberal Party, Beauchamp also chaired (in December 1913) the Central Land and Housing Council, which was designed to advance Lloyd George's Land Campaign. He was again in government as Lord President of the Council from 1914 to 1915. However, he was not a member of the coalition government formed by Asquith in May 1915. Lord Beauchamp never returned to ministerial office but was the Liberal leader in the House of Lords from 1924 to 1931, supporting the ailing party with his substantial fortune.

While serving in Parliament, Beauchamp also voiced his support for a range of progressive measures such as workmen's compensation, an expansion in rural housing provision, an agricultural minimum wage, improved safety standards and reduced working hours for miners.

== Other public appointments ==
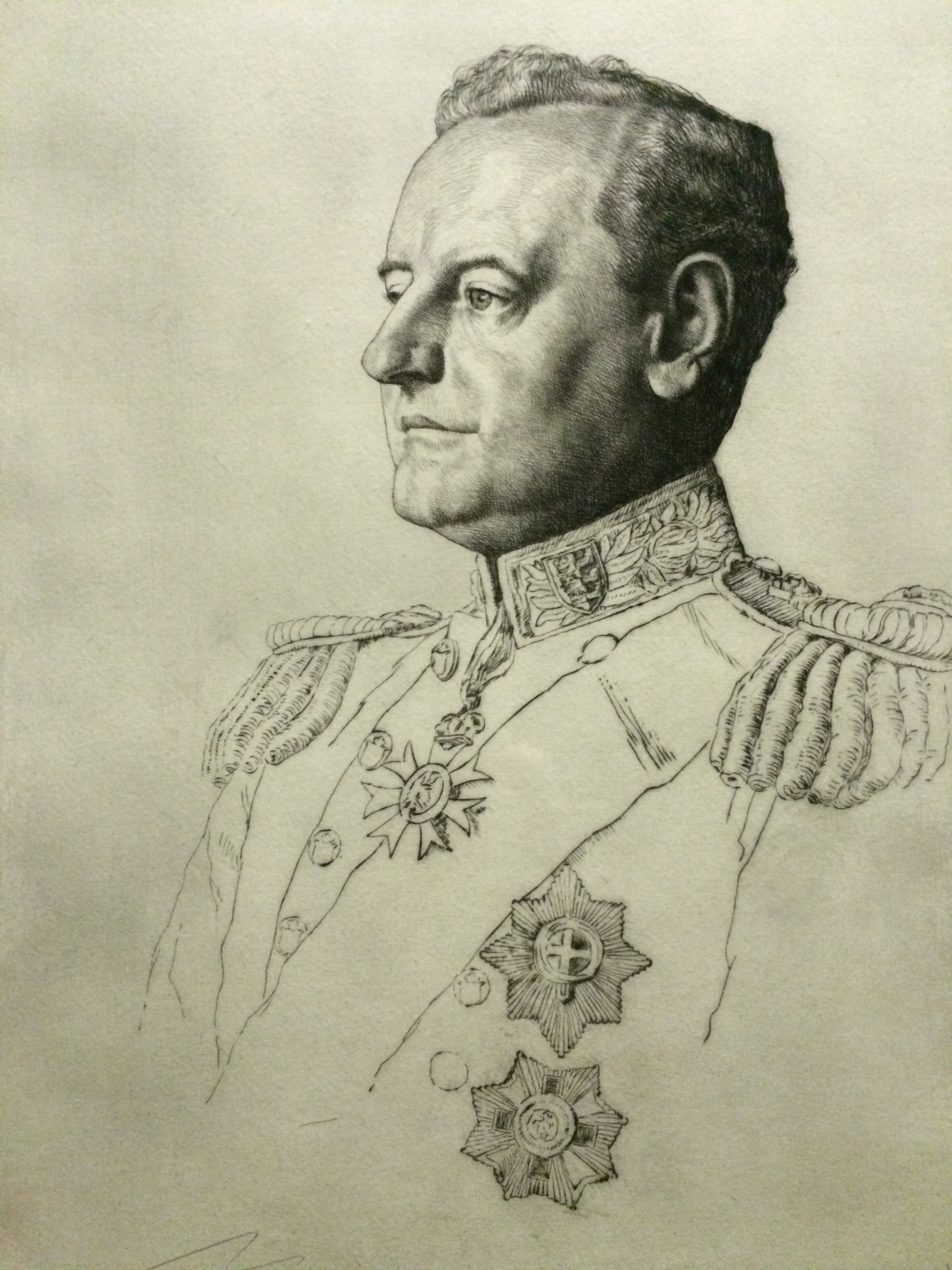
Beauchamp as Lord Warden of the Cinque Ports, 1920

Beauchamp was appointed Honorary Colonel of the 1st Worcestershire Royal Garrison Artillery (Volunteers) on 5 November 1902.

He was made Lord Lieutenant of Gloucestershire in 1911, carried the Sword of State at the coronation of King George V, was made Lord Warden of the Cinque Ports in 1913 and a Knight Companion of the Garter in 1914. He was also Chancellor of the University of London and a Six Master (Governor of RGS Worcester).

In June 1901, Beauchamp received an honorary Doctor of Laws (LLD) degree from the University of Glasgow.

== Sexuality and blackmail ==
In 1931, Lord Beauchamp was "outed" as a homosexual. Although Beauchamp's homosexuality (a trait shared with his late paternal uncle Henry Lygon, 5th Earl Beauchamp) was an open secret in parts of high society and one that his political opponents had refrained from using against him despite its illegality, Lady Beauchamp was oblivious to it and professed a confusion as to what homosexuality was when it was revealed. At one stage she thought her husband was being accused of being a bugler. He had numerous affairs at Madresfield Court and Walmer Castle, with his partners ranging from servants to socialites, including local men.

In 1930, while on a trip to Australia, it became common knowledge in London society that one of the men escorting him, Robert Bernays, a member of the Liberal Party, was a lover.

It was reported to King George V and Queen Mary by Beauchamp's Tory brother-in-law, the Duke of Westminster, who privately disliked Beauchamp and hoped to ruin both him and the Liberal Party through Beauchamp's downfall. Homosexual practice was a criminal offence at the time, and the King was horrified; he is rumoured to have said, "I thought men like that shot themselves".

The King had a personal interest in the case, for his sons the Duke of Gloucester and the Duke of Kent had visited Madresfield in the past. Kent was then in a relationship with Beauchamp's daughter Lady Mary Lygon, which was cut off after her father was outed.

After Westminster had gathered sufficient evidence, Beauchamp was made an offer to separate from his wife Lettice, retire on a pretence and then leave the country. Beauchamp accepted and left the country immediately in June 1931, living a nomadic life in the global homosexual hotspots of the time. Shortly afterwards, the Countess Beauchamp obtained a divorce. There was no public scandal, but Lord Beauchamp resigned all his offices, save the sinecure of Lord Warden of the Cinque Ports, which he retained until 1934. Following his departure for the continent, his brother-in-law sent him a note which read: "Dear Bugger-in-law, you got what you deserved. Yours, Westminster."

Lord Beauchamp's last partner was David Smyth (né Glory Smyth-Pigott: son of John Smyth-Pigott, second leader of the messianic sect the Agapemonites), to whom he left a Sydney mansion and share portfolio.

== Literary inspiration ==
Lord Beauchamp is generally supposed to have been the model for Lord Marchmain in Evelyn Waugh's novel Brideshead Revisited. They were both aristocrats in exile, though for different reasons. In his 1977 book Homosexuals in History, historian A. L. Rowse suggests that Beauchamp's failed appointment as Governor of New South Wales was the inspiration for Hilaire Belloc's satirical children's poem,"Lord Lundy", which has in its final lines a command to Lord Lundy from his aged grandfather: "But as it is!...My language fails! Go out and govern New South Wales!" Nevertheless, says Rowse, "Lord Lundy's chronic weakness was tears. This was not Lord Beauchamp's weakness: he enjoyed life, was always gay."

== Family ==
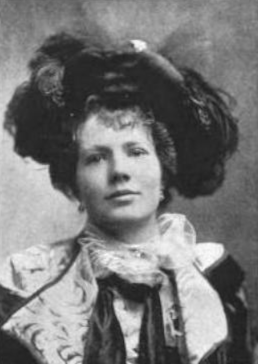
Lady Lettice Grosvenor in 1902

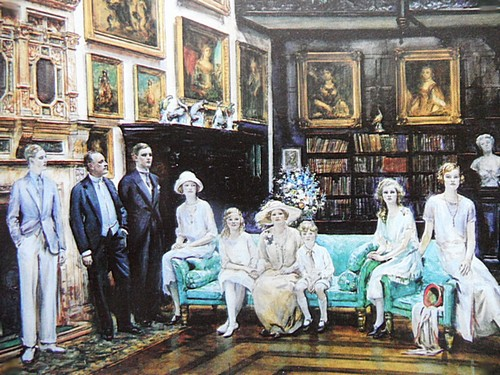
Earl and Countess Beauchamp with their family at Madresfield on the occasion of Viscount Elmley's coming of age, c. 1925

Lord Beauchamp married at Eccleston, Cheshire, on 26 July 1902 Lady Lettice Grosvenor, daughter of Victor Grosvenor, Earl Grosvenor, and Lady Sibell Lumley, and granddaughter of the 1st Duke of Westminster. They had three sons and four daughters:

- William Lygon, 8th Earl Beauchamp (3 July 1903 – 3 January 1979), the last Earl Beauchamp. His widow, Mona Dornonville de la Cour (née Schiwe), died in 1989.
- The Hon. Hugh Patrick Lygon (2 November 1904 – 19 August 1936, Rothenburg, Bavaria), said to be the model for Lord Sebastian Flyte in Brideshead Revisited.
- Lady Lettice Lygon (16 June 1906–1973), who married 1930 (div. 1958) Sir Richard Charles Geers Cotterell, 5th Bt. (1907–1978) and had children.
- Lady Sibell Lygon (10 October 1907 – 31 October 2005), who married 11 February 1939 (bigamously) and 1949 (legally) Michael Rowley (d. 19 September 1952), stepson of her maternal uncle, the 2nd Duke of Westminster.
- Lady Mary Lygon (12 February 1910 – 27 September 1982), who married 1937 (div.) HH Prince Vsevolod Ivanovich of Russia, and had no children.
- Lady Dorothy Lygon (22 February 1912 – 13 November 2001), who married 1985 (sep.) Robert Heber-Percy (d. 1987) of Faringdon, Berkshire.
- The Hon. Richard Edward Lygon (25 December 1916 – 1970), who married 1939 Patricia Janet Norman; their younger daughter Rosalind Lygon, now Lady Morrison (b. 1946), inherited Madresfield Court in 1979.

Lord Beauchamp died of cancer in New York in 1938, aged 66. He was succeeded in the earldom by his eldest son, William. The children never made peace with their mother for her role in the downfall of their father; Lady Beauchamp, "having always being disliked and now hated by her children", was evicted from Madresfield Court by her daughters and spent the remainder of her life at her brother's estate in Cheshire. Lady Beauchamp died in 1936, aged 59, estranged from all her children except her youngest child.

== Bibliography ==
- Bloch, Michael (2015). Closet Queens. Little, Brown. ISBN 1408704129 Chapter 1
- Dutton, David (Summer 1999). "William Lygon, 7th Earl Beauchamp (1872–1938)" (PDF). Journal of Liberal History (23). Archived from the original (PDF) on 10 March 2007.
- Hazlehurst, Cameron (1979). "Beauchamp, seventh Earl (1872–1938)". Australian Dictionary of Biography. 7. Melbourne University Press.
- Hobhouse, Charles (1971). David, Edward (ed.). Inside Asquith's Cabinet: The Political Diaries of Charles Hobhouse. London: John Murray. ISBN 0719533872.
- Jordaan, Peter (2023). A Secret Between Gentlemen: Suspects, Strays and Guests. Sydney: Alchemie Books. ISBN 9780645852745.
- Mulvagh, Jane (2009). Madresfield: The Real Brideshead. Oxford: ISIS. ISBN 9780753183380.
- Raina, Peter (2016). The Seventh Earl Beauchamp: A Victim of His Times. Lausanne: Peter Lang. ISBN 9781906165628.

Government offices
Preceded by The Viscount Hampden	Governor of New South Wales; 1899–1901	Succeeded by Sir Harry Rawson
Political offices
Preceded by The Lord Belper	Captain of the Gentlemen-at-Arms; 1905–1907	Succeeded by The Lord Denman
Preceded by The Earl of Liverpool	Lord Steward; 1907–1910	Succeeded by The Earl of Chesterfield
Preceded by The Viscount Wolverhampton	Lord President of the Council; 1910	Succeeded by The Viscount Morley of Blackburn
Preceded by Lewis Vernon Harcourt	First Commissioner of Works; 1910–1914	Succeeded by The Lord Emmott
Preceded by The Viscount Morley of Blackburn	Lord President of the Council; 1914–1915	Succeeded by The Marquess of Crewe
Party political offices
Preceded by The Viscount Grey of Fallodon	Leader of the Liberals in the House of Lords; 1924–1931	Succeeded by The Marquess of Reading
Academic offices
Preceded by The Earl of Rosebery	Chancellor of the University of London; 1929–1931	Succeeded by The Earl of Athlone
Honorary titles
Preceded by The Earl of Ducie	Lord Lieutenant of Gloucestershire; 1911–1931	Succeeded by The Duke of Beaufort
Preceded by The Earl Brassey	Lord Warden of the Cinque Ports; 1913–1934	Succeeded by The Marquess of Reading
Peerage of the United Kingdom
Preceded by Frederick Lygon	Earl Beauchamp; 1891–1938	Succeeded by William Lygon
