= Lord Lieutenant of Herefordshire =

Civil post in Herefordshire, England

This is a list of people who have served as Lord Lieutenant of Herefordshire. Before the English Civil War, the lieutenancy of Herefordshire was always held by the Lord Lieutenant of Wales, but after the Restoration, its lieutenants were appointed separately. Since 1714, all the Lord Lieutenants have also been Custos Rotulorum of Herefordshire.

== Lord Lieutenants of Herefordshire until 1974 ==
- see Lord Lieutenant of Wales for pre-English Civil War lieutenants
- Robert Devereux, 3rd Earl of Essex (appointed by Parliament) 1642 - 14 September 1646
- Interregnum
- Henry Somerset, 1st Duke of Beaufort 30 July 1660 – 22 March 1689
- Charles Gerard, 1st Earl of Macclesfield 22 March 1689 – 31 May 1694
- Charles Talbot, 1st Duke of Shrewsbury 31 May 1694 – 15 June 1704
- Henry Grey, 1st Duke of Kent 15 June 1704 – 18 November 1714
- Thomas Coningsby, 1st Earl Coningsby 18 November 1714 – 11 September 1721
- James Brydges, 1st Duke of Chandos 11 September 1721 – 16 July 1741
- Charles Hanbury Williams 16 July 1741 – 5 June 1747
- John Bateman, 2nd Viscount Bateman 5 June 1747 – 2 March 1802
- George Capell-Coningsby, 5th Earl of Essex 20 March 1802 – 28 October 1817
- John Somers Cocks, 1st Earl Somers 28 October 1817 – 5 January 1841
- William Bateman, 1st Baron Bateman 29 January 1841 – 22 July 1845
- John Somers Somers-Cocks, 2nd Earl Somers 6 August 1845 – 5 October 1852
- William Bateman Bateman-Hanbury, 2nd Baron Bateman 11 November 1852 – 30 November 1901
- John Hungerford Arkwright 27 January 1902 – 5 December 1904
- Sir John Cotterell, 4th Baronet 5 December 1904 – 27 July 1933
- Arthur Somers-Cocks, 6th Baron Somers 27 July 1933 – 14 July 1944
- Sir Richard Cotterell, 5th Baronet 28 February 1945 – 12 July 1957
- James Thomas, 1st Viscount Cilcennin 9 September 1957 – 13 July 1960
- John Francis Maclean 18 October 1960 – 31 March 1974 †

On 31 March 1974 most of Worcestershire merged with Herefordshire to form the new county of Hereford and Worcester (see Lord Lieutenant of Hereford and Worcester). After the abolition of Hereford and Worcester in 1998 after only 24 years, the two counties again became two separate administrative counties as well as two separate lieutenancy areas.

† Became Lord Lieutenant of Hereford and Worcester on 1 April 1974.

== Lord Lieutenants of Herefordshire 1998–present ==
- Sir Thomas Dunne 1 April 1998 – 24 October 2008
- Susan Bligh, Countess of Darnley 24 October 2008 - 2020
- Edward Mortimer Harley 15 April 2020

== Deputy lieutenants ==
A deputy lieutenant of Herefordshire is commissioned by the Lord Lieutenant of Herefordshire. Deputy lieutenants support the work of the lord-lieutenant. There can be several deputy lieutenants at any time, depending on the population of the county. Their appointment does not terminate with the changing of the lord-lieutenant, but they usually retire at age 75.

=== 19th Century ===
- 21 July 1803: William Hanbury
- 21 July 1803: Major William Bateman-Hanbury, 1st Baron Bateman
- 21 July 1803: Captain Thomas Foley, 3rd Baron Foley
- 21 July 1803: Sir Thomas Winnington, 4th Baronet
- 21 July 1803: Captain R. Bowyear
- 21 July 1803: William Parry
- 21 July 1803: Francis Edwards
- 21 July 1803: John Ireland,
- 6 March 1846: Sir Velters Cornevall
- 6 March 1846: Admiral Sir Thomas Hastings
- 6 March 1846: George Strong
- 6 March 1846: James Davies
- 6 March 1846: John Hopton
- 6 March 1846: Joseph Stinton
- 6 March 1846: William Henry Cooke
- 6 March 1846: Benjamin Boddington
- 6 March 1846: Thomas Evans
- 6 March 1846: John Heming St. John, Clerk
- 6 March 1846: Archer Clive, Clerk
- 6 March 1846: William Parsons Hopton, Clerk
- 6 March 1846: Edward Higgins, Clerk
- 6 March 1846: William Edwards, Clerk
