= Halsey Ricardo =

English architect and designer (1854–1928)

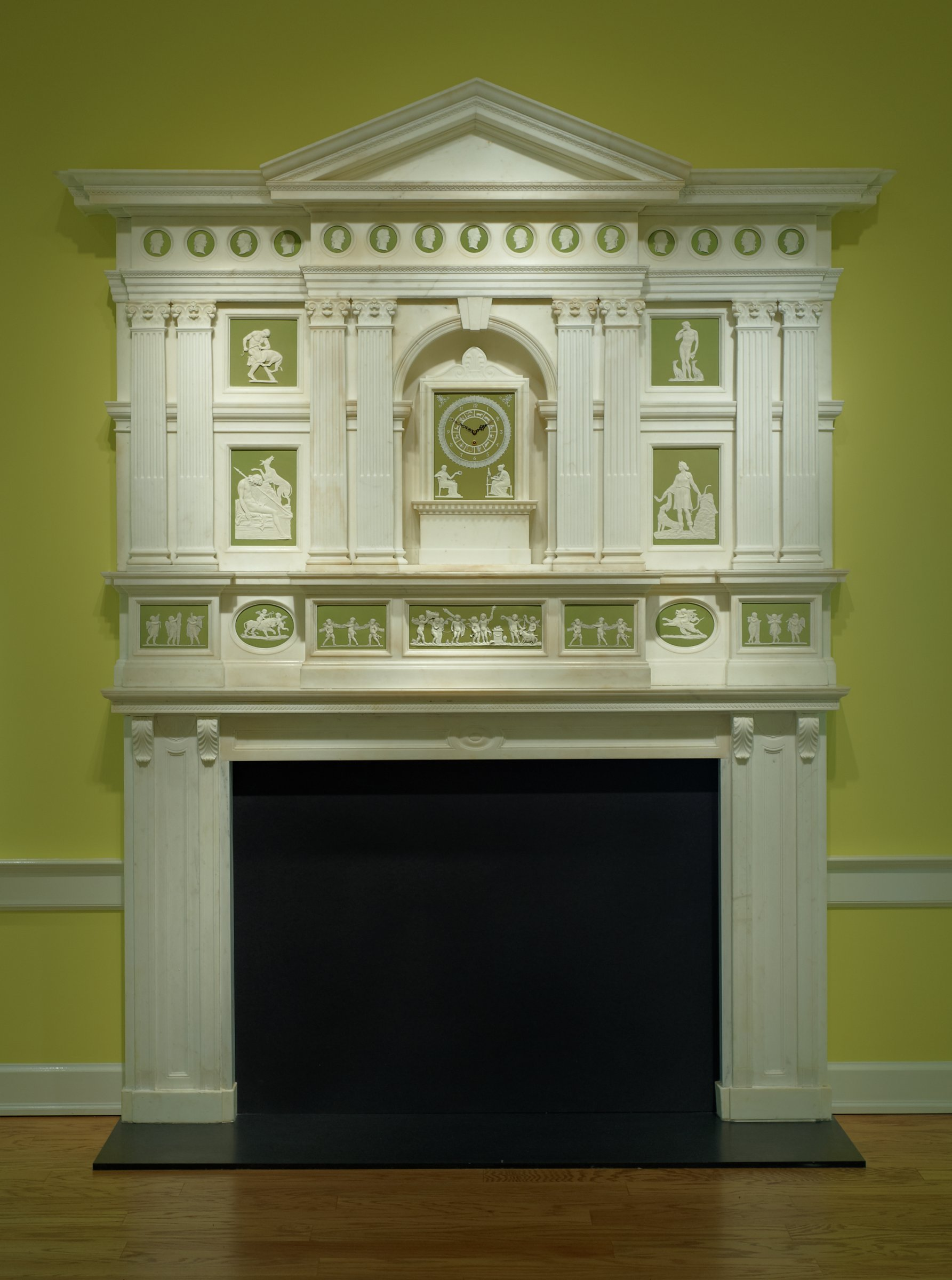
Created in the Neoclassical style, the jasperware plaques, medallions, and clock are made from 18th century moulds. Held at the Birmingham Museum of Art.

Halsey Ralph Ricardo (6 August 1854 – 15 February 1928) was an English architect and designer.

== Family history ==
Ricardo was born in Bath, Somerset on 6 August 1854. He was a son of banker Harry Ralph Ricardo (1822–1860), who founded the Bath and County Club in 1858, and Anna Halsey (a daughter of Henry Halsey). He was a brother of Percy Ralph Ricardo, Arthur Ralph Ricardo of Stony Yarrows, Mayford, Harry William Ralph Ricardo and Mary Caroline Ricardo.

His paternal grandfather, Raphael "Ralph" Ricardo, was a brother of the prominent political economist David Ricardo, a Sephardi Jew of Portuguese origin who had relocated from the Dutch Republic. Through his uncle, stockbroker Percy Ricardo of Bramley Park, he was a first cousin of Amy Gordon-Lennox, Countess of March (wife of Charles Gordon-Lennox, 7th Duke of Richmond, before he inherited the dukedom), Ellen Maud Ricard (wife of Sir Hervey Bruce, 4th Baronet), Col. Horace Ricardo, and Col. F. C. Ricardo.

== Career ==
He established his practice in 1878, and for 10 years worked in partnership with William De Morgan (1839–1917), for whom he designed tiles, vases, and other artefacts. He advocated the use of glazed materials to resist the polluted atmosphere of nineteenth century London. In this, he anticipated the designs of Otto Wagner in Vienna, who used coloured tiles set in the same planes as walls and piers to suggest architectural features.

He designed several buildings, of which the best were the Howrah Station, gateway to Calcutta, situated in the twin city Howrah, district Howrah, West Bengal, India (1901; with a glowing exterior of brick and coloured tiles), and Debenham House in Holland Park (1905–08), completely faced with impervious glazed materials, even the roof-tiles. He was an Arts-and-Crafts architect, whose work was extraordinarily sensitive, imaginative, and original. Among his works his own house, ‘Woodside’, Graffham, near Petworth, Sussex (1905), deserves note. In 1910, Ricardo was elected as the Master of the Art Workers' Guild.

In 1882, Halsey designed a mantelpiece for the house at Buckminster Park, then the seat for the Earls of Dysart. It was part of a larger plan for the dining room of the house. The green used was mixed by Ricardo and then copied by Wedgwood as a new jasperware colour. Originally called "peach green," it is now known as "Dysart green," from the original owners of the house.

In 1914-15, he designed a house in Chelsea, London, as a wedding gift for his daughter, Anna.

== Personal life ==
Ricard was married to Catharine Jane Rendel, a daughter of civil engineer Sir Alexander Meadows Rendel. Together, they were the parents of:

- Harry Ricardo (1885–1974), who contributed to the development of the internal combustion engine.
- Anna Catherine Ricardo (1889–1959), who married Charles Maresco Pearce.
- Esther Mary Ricardo (1893–1962), who married Walter Goldie Howarth.

Ricardo died on 15 February 1928 in Graffham, Sussex.
