= Alexander Gordon-Lennox (Royal Navy officer) =

Royal Navy Rear Admiral (1911–1987)

Rear-Admiral Sir Alexander Gordon-Lennox KCVO CB DSO
- Sir Alexander Gordon-Lennox as Serjeant at Arms of the House of Commons
- Born: 9 April 1911; Chelsea, London
- Died: 4 July 1987 (aged 76)
- Military career
- Allegiance: United Kingdom
- Branch: Royal Navy
- Service years: 1924–1962
- Rank: Rear-Admiral
- Commands: 2nd Frigate Squadron; HMS Mercury; HMS Newcastle; Royal Naval College, Greenwich
- Conflicts: World War II; Malayan Emergency
- Awards: Knight Commander of the Royal Victorian Order; Companion of the Order of the Bath; Distinguished Service Order

Rear-Admiral Sir Alexander "Sandy" Henry Charles Gordon-Lennox KCVO CB DSO (9 April 1911 – 4 July 1987) was a British Royal Navy officer who became President of the Royal Naval College, Greenwich. He was Serjeant at Arms of the House of Commons from 1962–76.

== Early life and education ==
Gordon-Lennox was born in 1908 in Chelsea, London into an aristocratic family, the younger son of Major Lord Bernard Gordon-Lennox, and his wife, Hon. Evelyn Loch. His grandfathers were Charles Gordon-Lennox, 7th Duke of Richmond and Henry Loch, 1st Baron Loch. His elder brother was Lieutenant-General Sir George "Geordie" Gordon-Lennox (1908–1988). His father was killed in 1914 at the First Battle of Ypres.

He was educated at Heatherdown School in Berkshire.

== Naval career ==
Gordon-Lennox joined the Royal Navy in 1924 as a cadet at Britannia Royal Naval College. He served in the Middle East, in East Coast convoys and in Arctic convoys during the Second World War. He became Commanding Officer of the sloop HMS Mermaid as well as Captain of the 2nd Frigate Squadron in 1954. He went on to become Commander of the signal school HMS Mercury in 1955, Flag Captain commanding the cruiser HMS Newcastle during the Malayan Emergency in 1957 and Deputy Chief of Supplies and Transport at the Admiralty in 1959.

His last appointment was as President of the Royal Naval College, Greenwich in 1961 before retiring in 1962. He was admitted a Companion of the Order of the Bath (CB) in the 1962 New Year Honours.

== Serjeant-at-arms ==
In August 1962, Queen Elizabeth II appointed Gordon-Lennox to serve as Serjeant at Arms of the House of Commons, a largely ceremonial role in the chamber but nevertheless a key leadership position in the administration of parliament. The appointment created reignited an ongoing controversy among the members, who felt they should be consulted in the selection of their serjeant-at-arms. The issue had last been brought up in the 1950s. Gordon-Lennox's aristocratic background and the fact that his uncle Lord Esmé Gordon-Lennox had served in a similar position in the House of Lords (as Yeoman Usher of the Black Rod from 1929–46) were viewed by some as influencing factors in the appointment.

Additionally, Gordon-Lennox, who was known to have a "salty" sense of humour, allegedly made a remark to Labour MP Charles Pannell that caused him offense. Pannell signed a motion challenging the appointment, which was signed by 60 other Labour members, requesting a committee be formed on the matter. Prime Minister Harold Macmillan discussed the procedure with the Queen and reached a compromise, deciding that she would make her appointment after consultation with the Speaker of the House of Commons on the selection. This new procedure was adopted and Gordon-Lennox was the first serjeant-at-arms since the 16th century to be selected by the House of Commons.

He served in the role from November 1962 until his retirement in 1976. The years he served as serjeant at arms saw an evolving Commons' administration, including demands for better facilities, a larger staff, and stricter security measures because of terrorist threats. In 1970, a member of the public threw tear gas bombs into the chamber. As MPs fled, Gordon-Lennox raced in to remove the ceremonial mace – that dates to the time of Charles II – from the speaker's table. Conservative MP Bill Deedes remarked that, "It was rather like going back for a treasure in the middle of battle."

In 1976, he was forced to intervene when Conservative MP Michael Heseltine seized the mace from the table and held it above his head in response to all of the member of the Labour Party breaking into song (their anthem "The Red Flag") during a heated debate.

He was appointed a Knight Commander of the Royal Victorian Order (KCVO) in the 1972 New Year Honours.

== Marriage and family ==
Admiral Gordon-Lennox married Barbara Steele in 1936, daughter of Brig.-Gen. Julian Steele. They had two sons who both followed Royal Navy careers:

- Capt. Michael Gordon-Lennox OBE (1938–2024), Naval officer and chairman of Blind Veterans UK. He was married to Dame Jennifer Gordon-Lennox (née Gibbs), a lady-in-waiting to the Queen Mother and later to Queen Elizabeth II.
- Andrew Gordon-Lennox (born 1948) became a Commander RN before serving as a Defence and Naval Attaché. He married Julia Morrison.

Military offices
Preceded by Earl Cairns	President, Royal Naval College, Greenwich; 1961–1962	Succeeded by Morgan Morgan-Giles
Government offices
Preceded by Sir Ivor Hughes	Serjeant-at-Arms of the House of Commons; 1962–1976	Succeeded by Sir Peter Thorne
