= Gordon Castle =

Castle in Moray, Scotland

Coordinates: 57.62135°N 3.08918°W

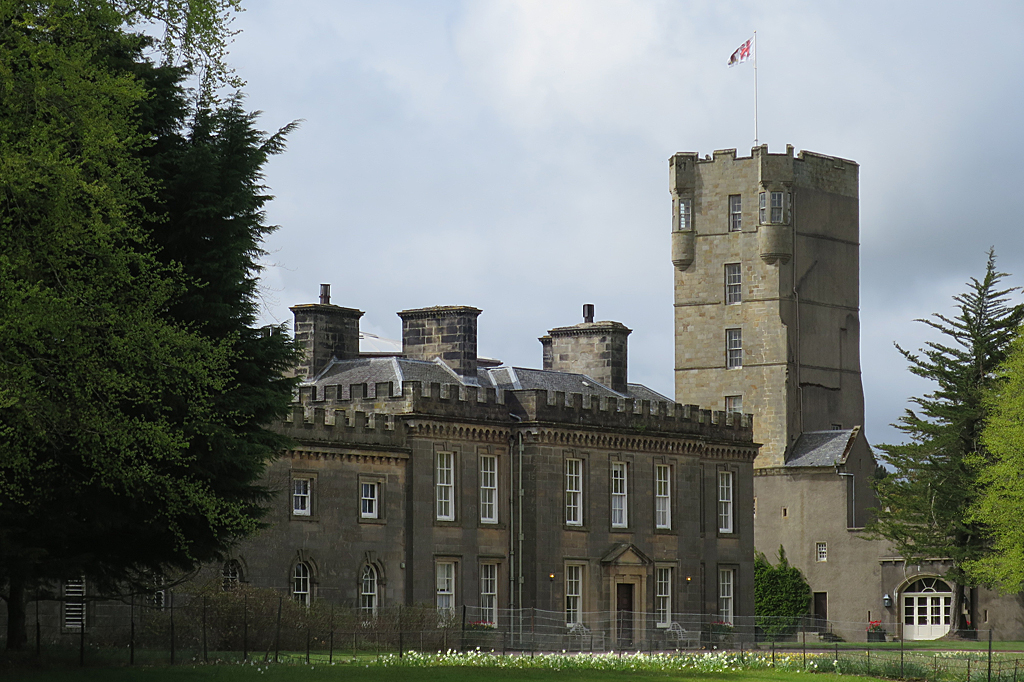
Gordon Castle with the Bog o’ Gight

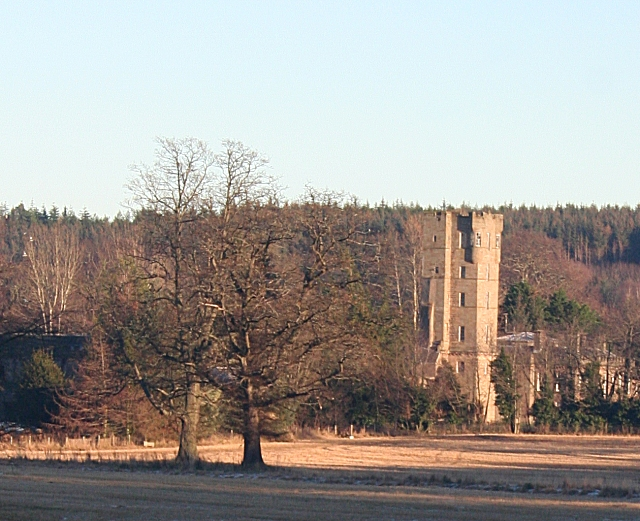
Gordon Castle from a distance

Gordon Castle is a historic country house and former ducal seat near Fochabers in the parish of Bellie in Moray, Scotland. Originally built in the 1470s by George Gordon, 2nd Earl of Huntly, as a fortified tower known as the Bog o’ Gight, it evolved over the centuries into one of the largest and most distinguished houses in Scotland. Rebuilt on a monumental Neoclassical scale in the late 18th century by Alexander Gordon, 4th Duke of Gordon, the castle served as the principal residence of the Dukes of Gordon and later of the Gordon-Lennox family, Dukes of Richmond and Gordon.

At its height, Gordon Castle was celebrated for its vast façade—over 170 metres long—and for its social prominence under Jane, Duchess of Gordon, who made it a centre of political and cultural life in the Highlands. Much of the house was demolished in the 1954 after wartime deterioration, but the surviving east wing and medieval tower remain as part of a private residence owned by the Gordon-Lennox family. The surrounding Walled Garden, among the largest in Britain, has been restored as a major heritage and horticultural attraction.

== History ==
=== Origins and early development ===
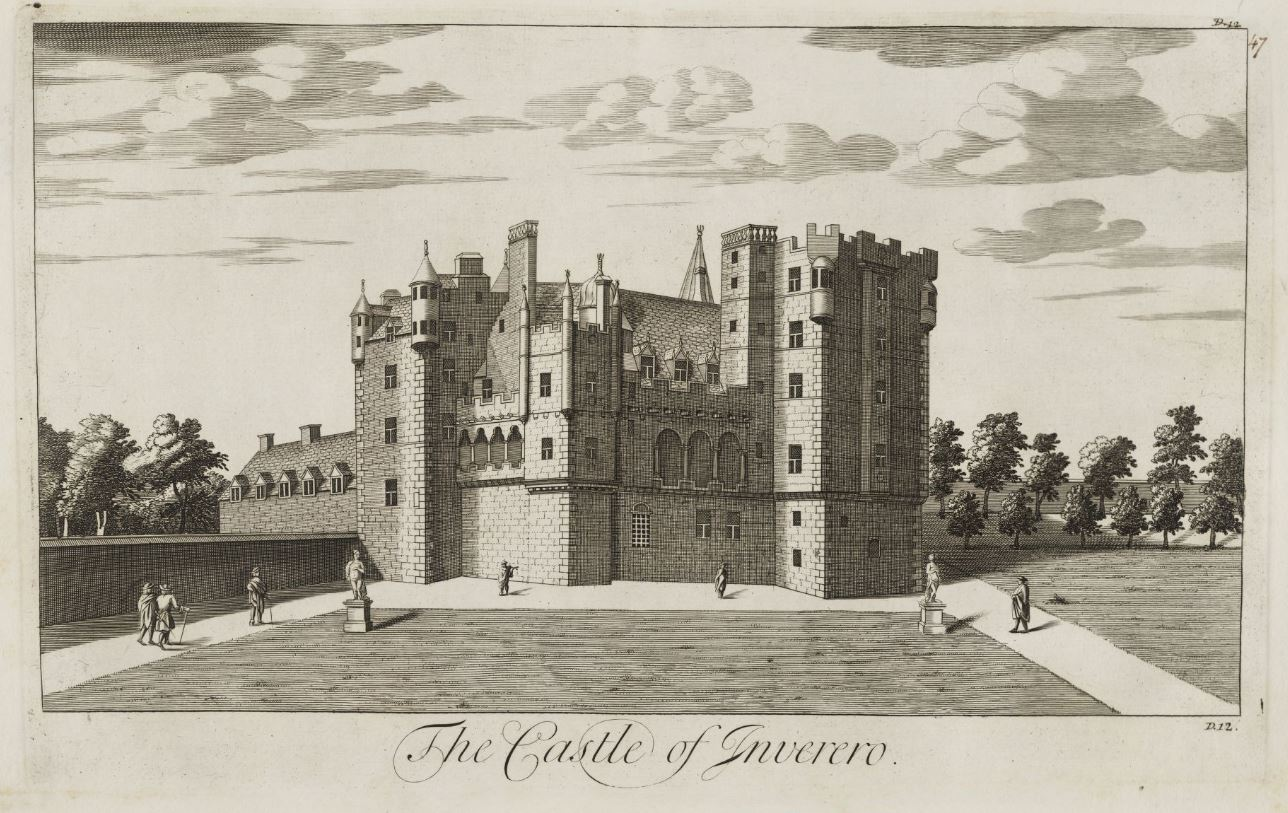
Engraving of the castle by John Slezer in Theatrum Scotiae published 1719

The origins of Gordon Castle reach back to the 12th century, when the Gordon family took its name from lands near Kelso in the Scottish Borders. By 1296, Sir Adam Gordon had gained royal favour under Robert the Bruce, who granted him extensive territories in Aberdeenshire, Banffshire, and Moray—including the Forest of Enzie and the old castle of Strathbogie at Huntly. His descendants rose to become Lords of Gordon, then Earls of Huntly, one of the most powerful families in northern Scotland.

In 1479, George Gordon, 2nd Earl of Huntly, began building a new stronghold in the Forest of Enzie known as Bog o’ Gight (or “Windy Bog”), the site that would later evolve into Gordon Castle. Over time, this six-storey tower house became the family’s northern seat and symbol of their growing dominance. George Gordon, 4th Earl of Huntly remodelled it into a Renaissance Z-plan mansion, celebrated by contemporary engravings such as John Slezer’s 1672 view and praised by Richard Franck for its “lofty and majestic towers and turrets that storm the air and seemingly make dents in the very clouds.” An inventory of the contents from November 1648 mentions lavish beds and a "hen house", a parrot cage in the long gallery.

Through the 16th and 17th centuries the Gordons' fortunes were intertwined with Scotland’s turbulent politics. They remained one of the few great families loyal to the Roman Catholic faith during the Reformation. The Jesuit Father James Gordon was at the castle of Bog of Gight on 5 August 1594, and receipted payments from the Papal treasury to the rebel Catholic Earls of Huntly, Errol, and Angus. The Gordon family supported the House of Stuart during the Jacobite uprisings. George Gordon, 4th Marquess of Huntly (1649–1716) was elevated to 1st Duke of Gordon by Charles II and became a prominent Jacobite after the Glorious Revolution of 1688. Under his descendants, the family gradually aligned with the Protestant Crown, particularly after the Jacobite rising of 1745, when the widowed Henrietta Mordaunt, Duchess of Gordon, publicly brought her children to the parish church, marking the family’s reconciliation with Hanoverian rule.

=== Georgian rebuilding ===
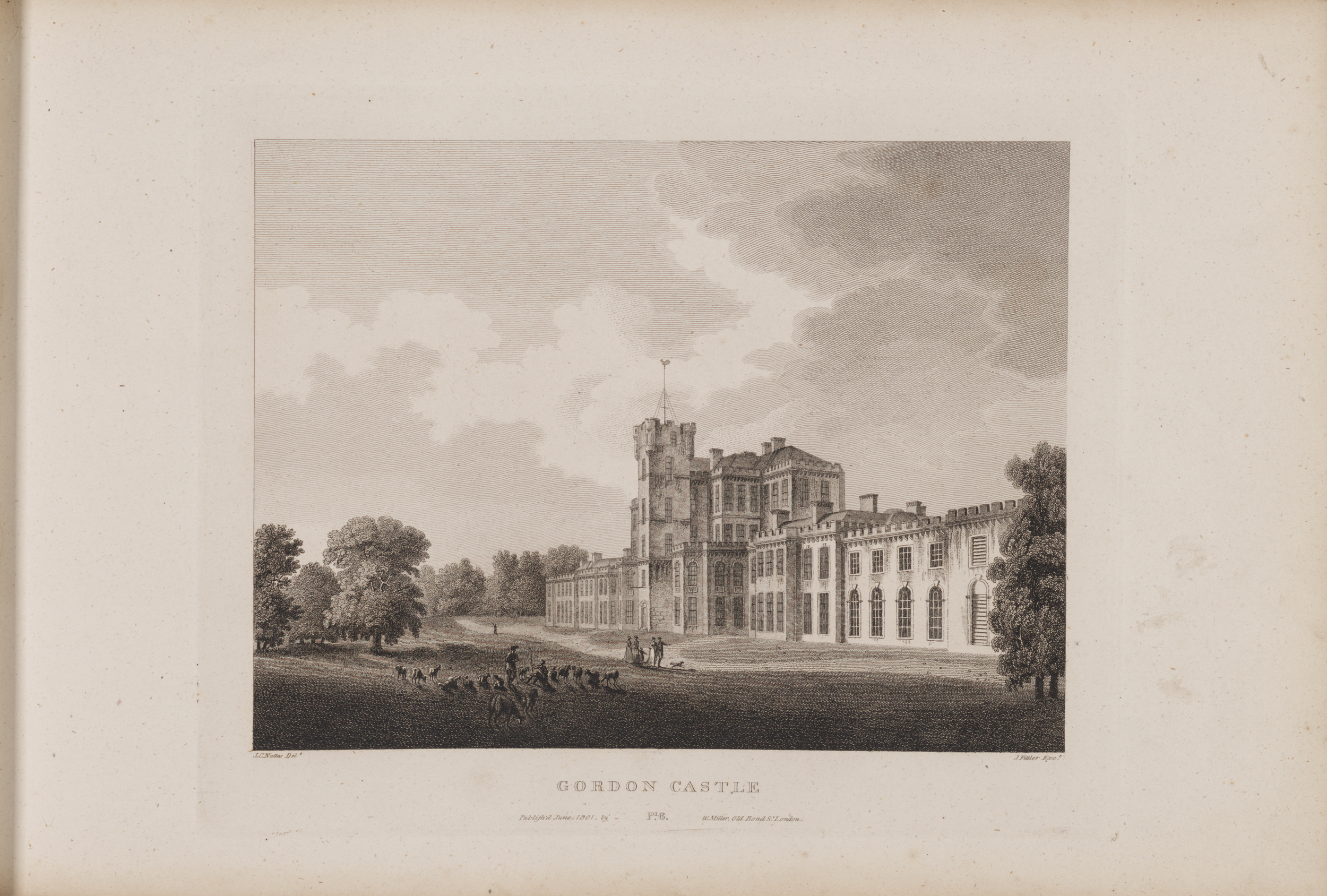
Engraving of the castle by James Fittler in Scotia Depicta published 1804

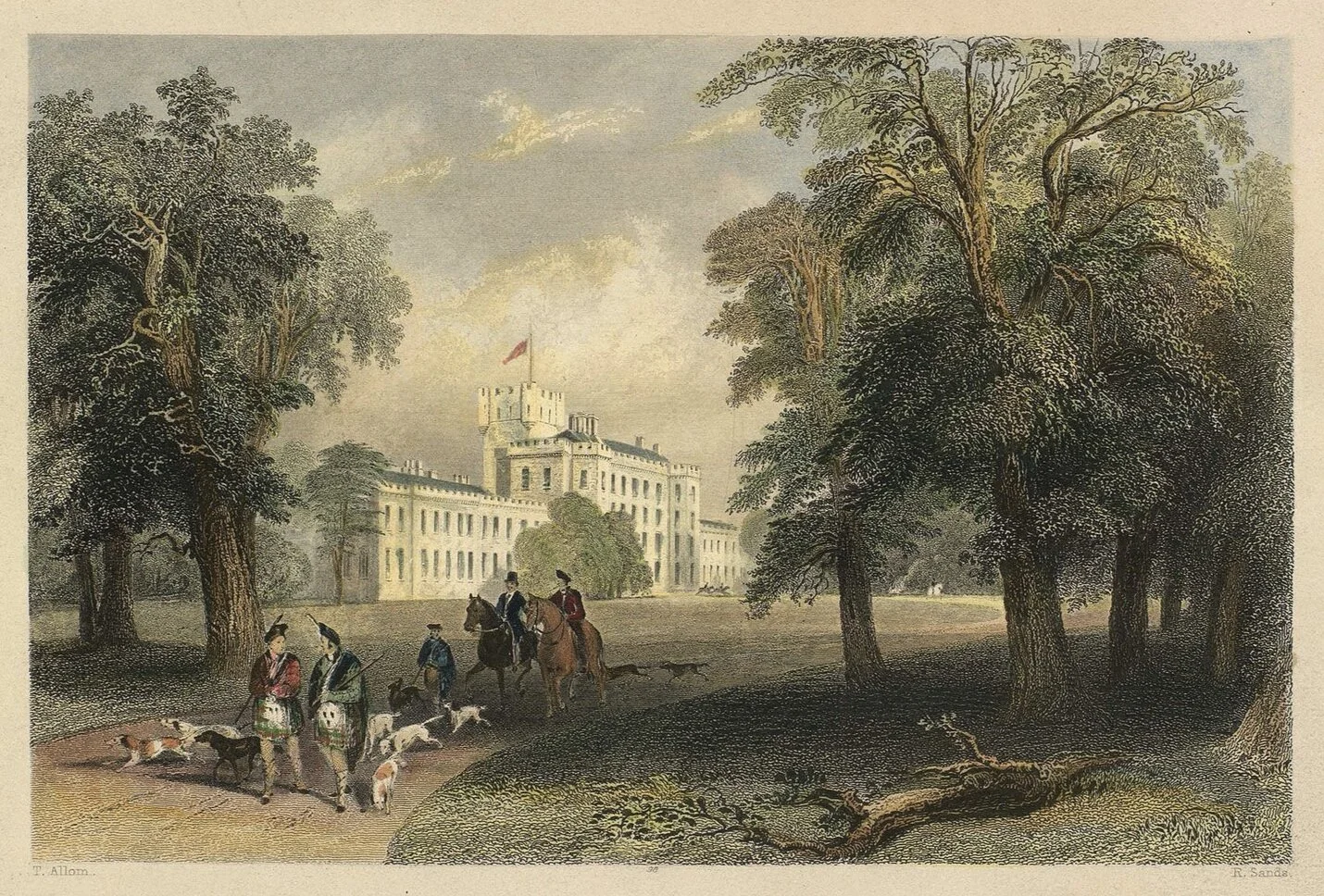
Engraving of the castle by Thomas Allen (1840s)

By the early 18th century, Gordon Castle and Fochabers had become the family’s principal seat. The Dukes of Gordon—often styled the Gudeman o’ the Bog or more grandly the Cock o’ the North—were among Scotland’s foremost magnates. The first major phase of expansion was undertaken in the 1720s by Alexander Gordon, 2nd Duke of Gordon, who greatly enlarged the footprint of the original medieval tower house. Alexander Gordon, 4th Duke of Gordon (1743–1827), who held the title for seventy-five years, transformed both the estate and its surroundings. He rebuilt the castle on a monumental scale, laid out the new planned village of Fochabers, and established the great Walled Garden that survives today.

His marriage to Jane Maxwell brought glamour and political influence. Their union was stormy—ending in estrangement—but during their years together they turned Gordon Castle into a centre of Highland culture and fashionable society. Among the guests was Robert Burns, who composed the poem “Castle Gordon” in gratitude for their hospitality.

Architect John Adam was commissioned, alongside the exiled Huguenot (French) architect Abraham Roumieu, to redesign the castle in 1764, but this did not come to fruition. Eventually the commission fell to the lesser-known Edinburgh architect, John Baxter, who started to rebuild the castle in 1769. He incorporated the six-storey medieval tower called the Bog o’ Gight into central four-storey block, which was flanked by a pair of two-storey wings. As a result, an immense classical mansion was created —the south façade alone extending nearly 173 metres (568 feet). The principal reception rooms, including the Drawing Room and Dining Room, occupied the first floor of the central block, while a chapel and conservatory filled the east wing. In 1827 the Aberdeen architect Archibald Simpson was commissioned to redesign the east wing after it was destroyed by fire.

The 4th Duke’s son, George Gordon, 5th Duke of Gordon, inherited the estate and furthered his father’s ambitions. He raised the regiment that became the Gordon Highlanders. Also, he is credited, with his father, for legalising whisky production for their tenant George Smith of Glenlivet, paving the way for the modern Glenlivet distillery. George’s marriage to Elizabeth Brodie produced no heirs, and on his death in 1836 the Dukedom became extinct.

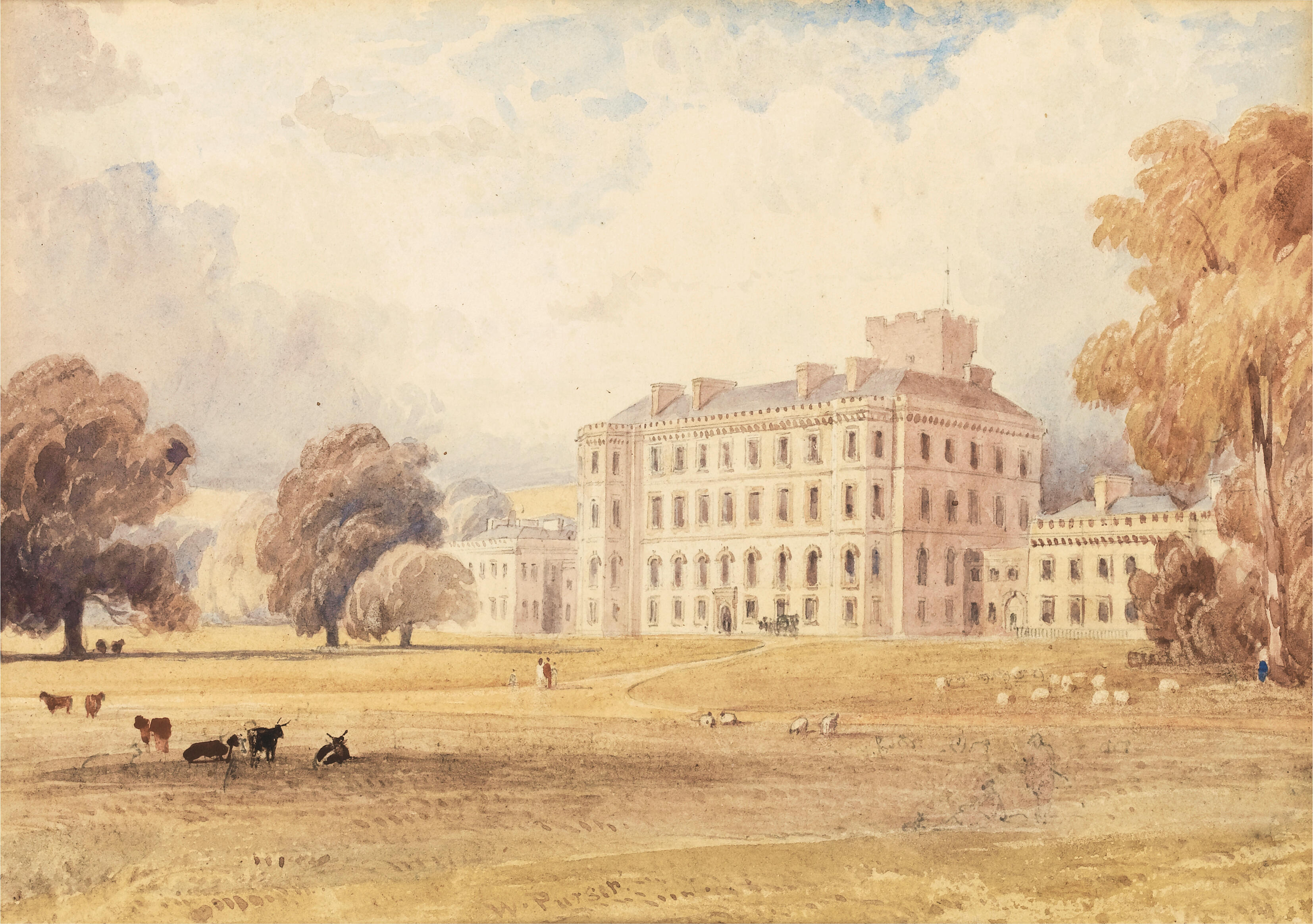
The north facade by William Purser

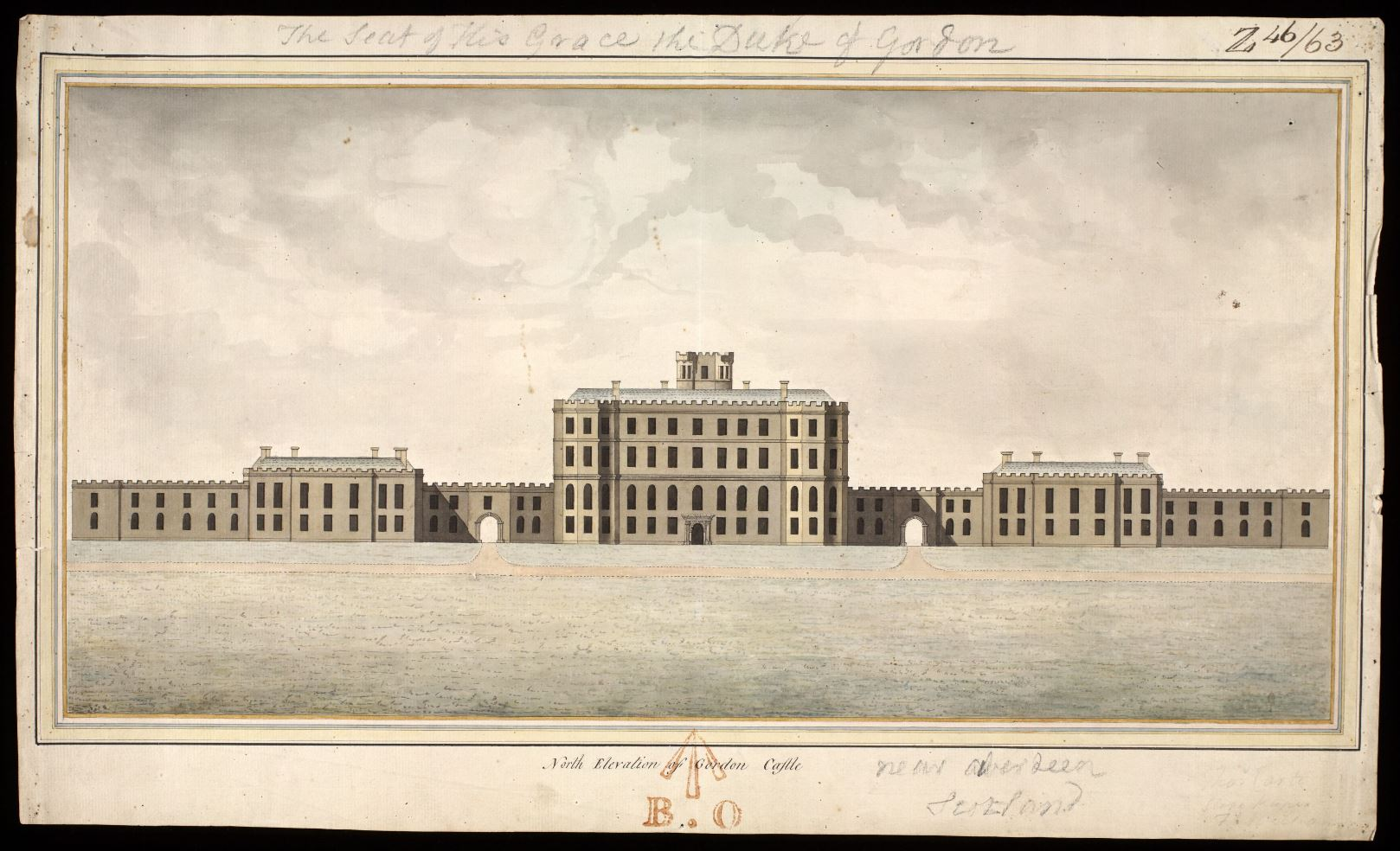
The north elevation

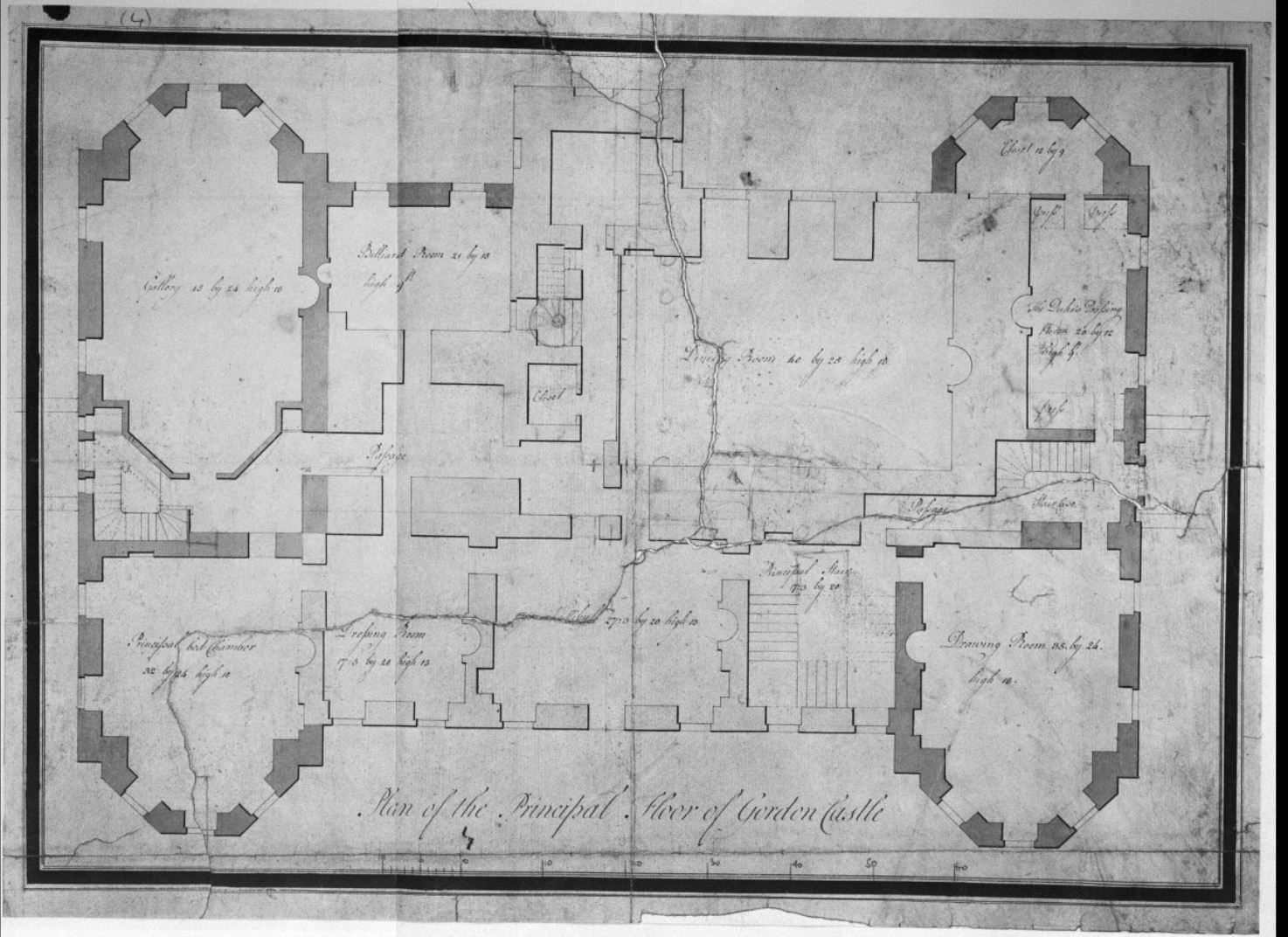
The principal floor of Gordon Castle

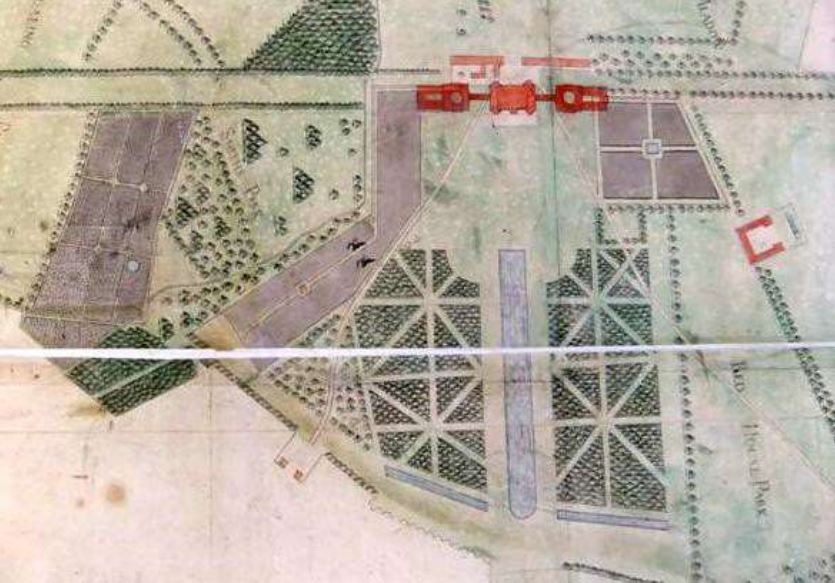
Garden plan (1768)

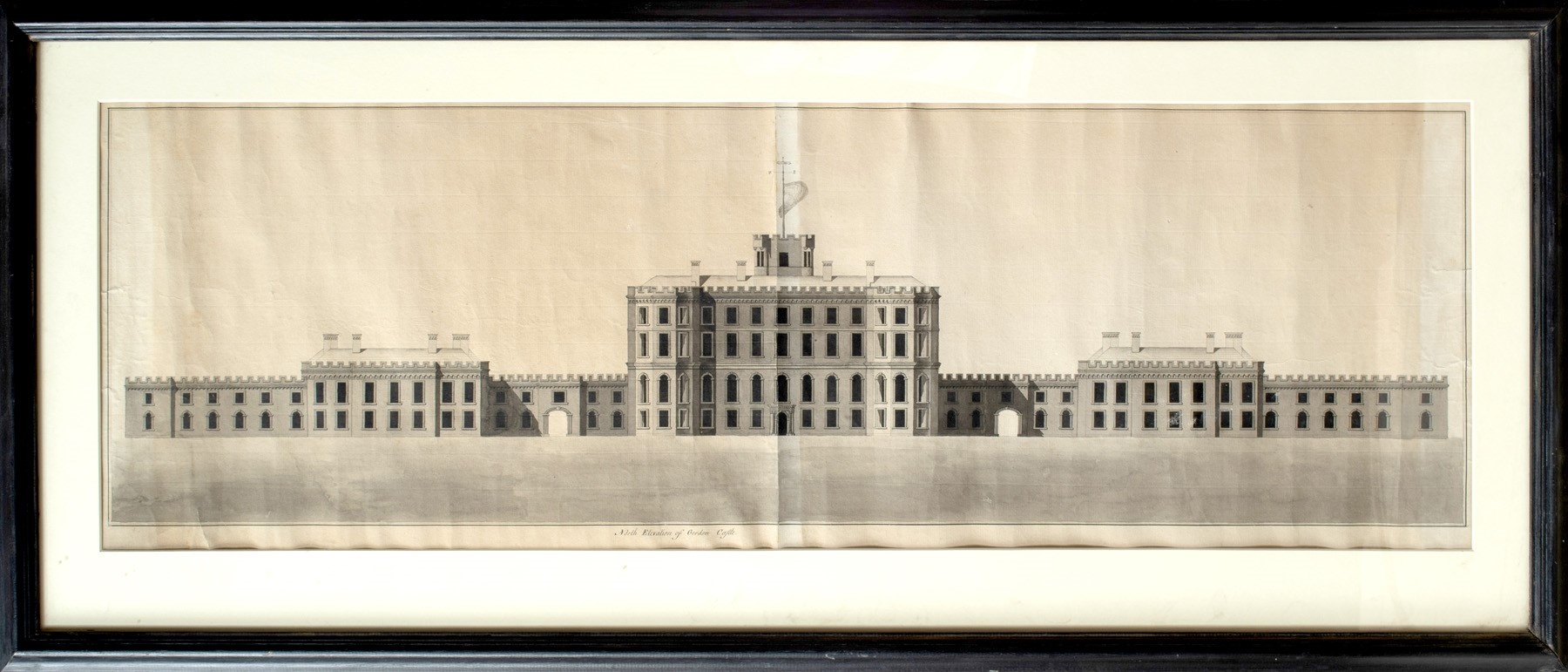
North elevation by John Baxter (1769)

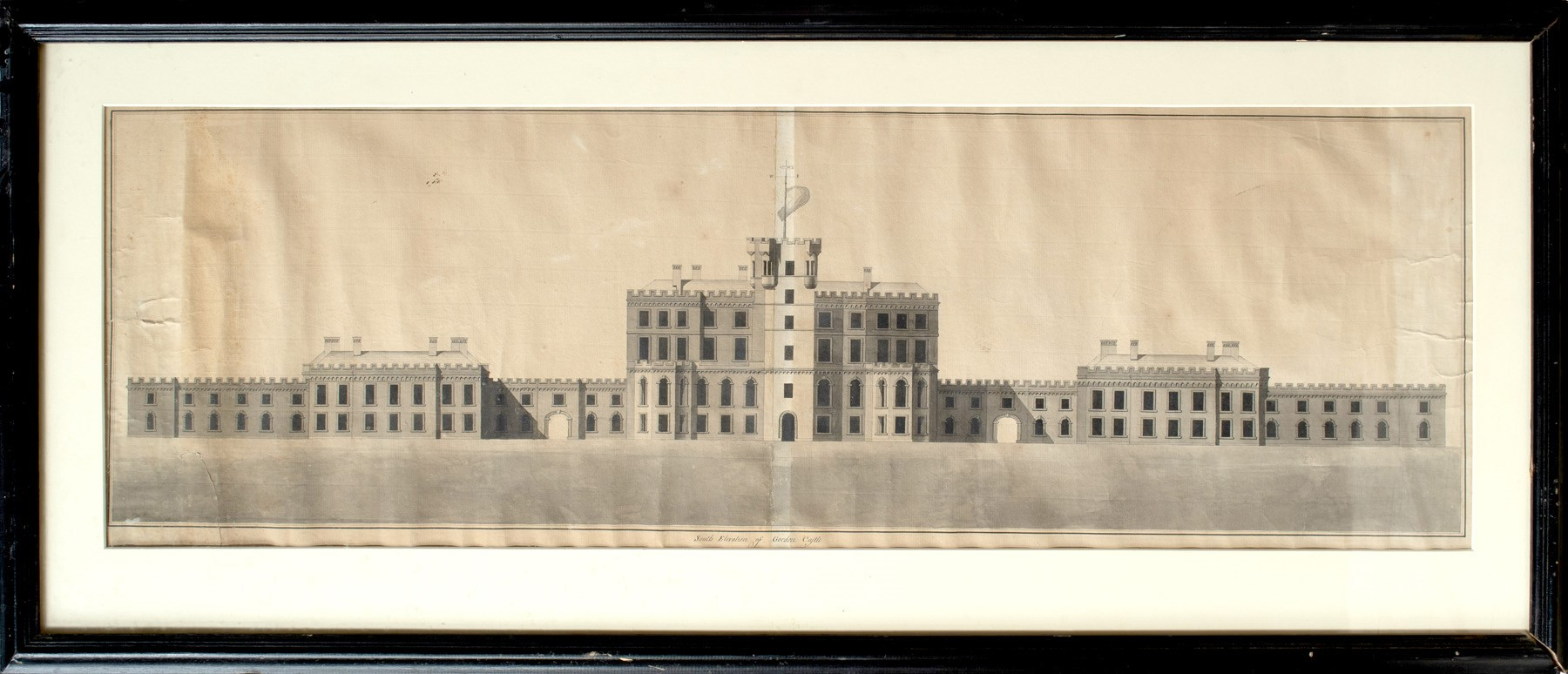
South elevation by John Baxter (1769)

=== Victorian and Edwardian splendour ===
The castle and estates passed to his nephew Charles Lennox, 5th Duke of Richmond, whose principal seat was Goodwood House in Sussex. To reflect the inheritance, he added the name Gordon to his own, founding the Gordon-Lennox line. Under his successors, the castle entered a period of extraordinary splendour.

The 6th and 7th Dukes of Richmond and Gordon presided over the estate from 1860 to 1928. During their tenure, Gordon Castle became a centre of late-Victorian and Edwardian society; the Prince of Wales (later King George V) was a frequent guest, and the family hosted the Gordon Castle Highland Games, drawing crowds of up to thirty thousand. The 7th Duke of Richmond also encouraged local industry, assisting William Baxter in establishing what became the Baxters of Speyside food company.

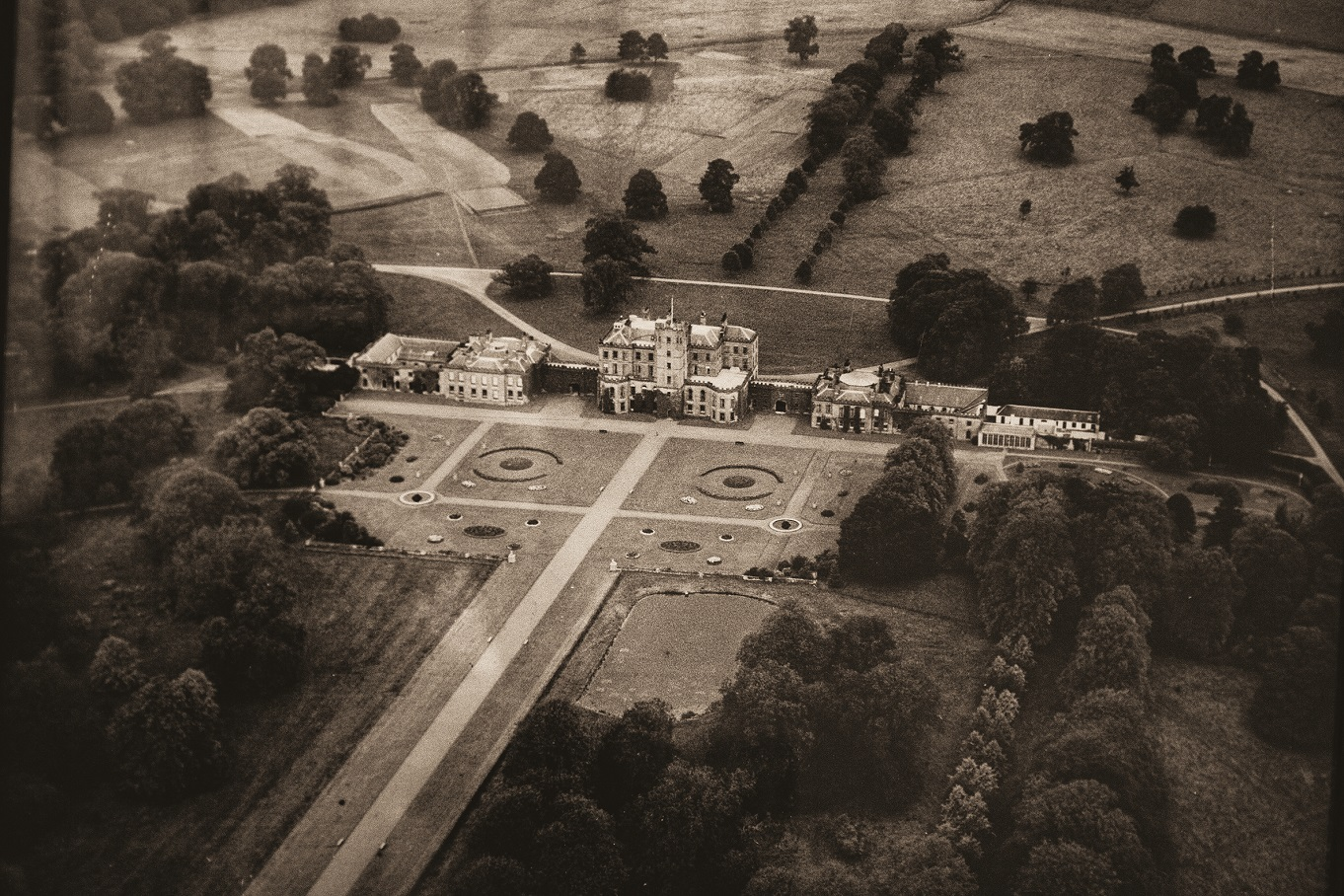
Gordon Castle from the air

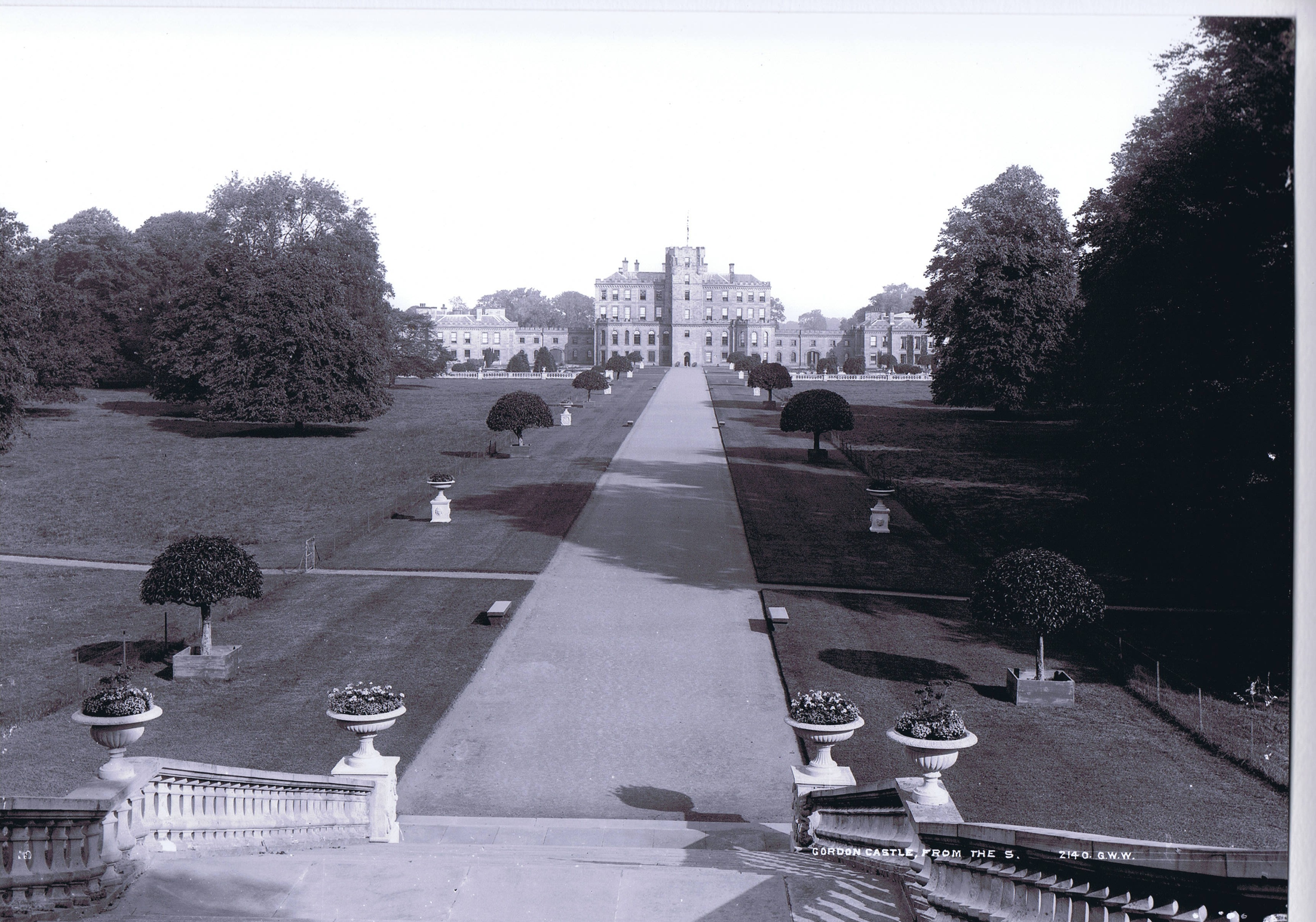
Gordon Castle and the Broad Walk

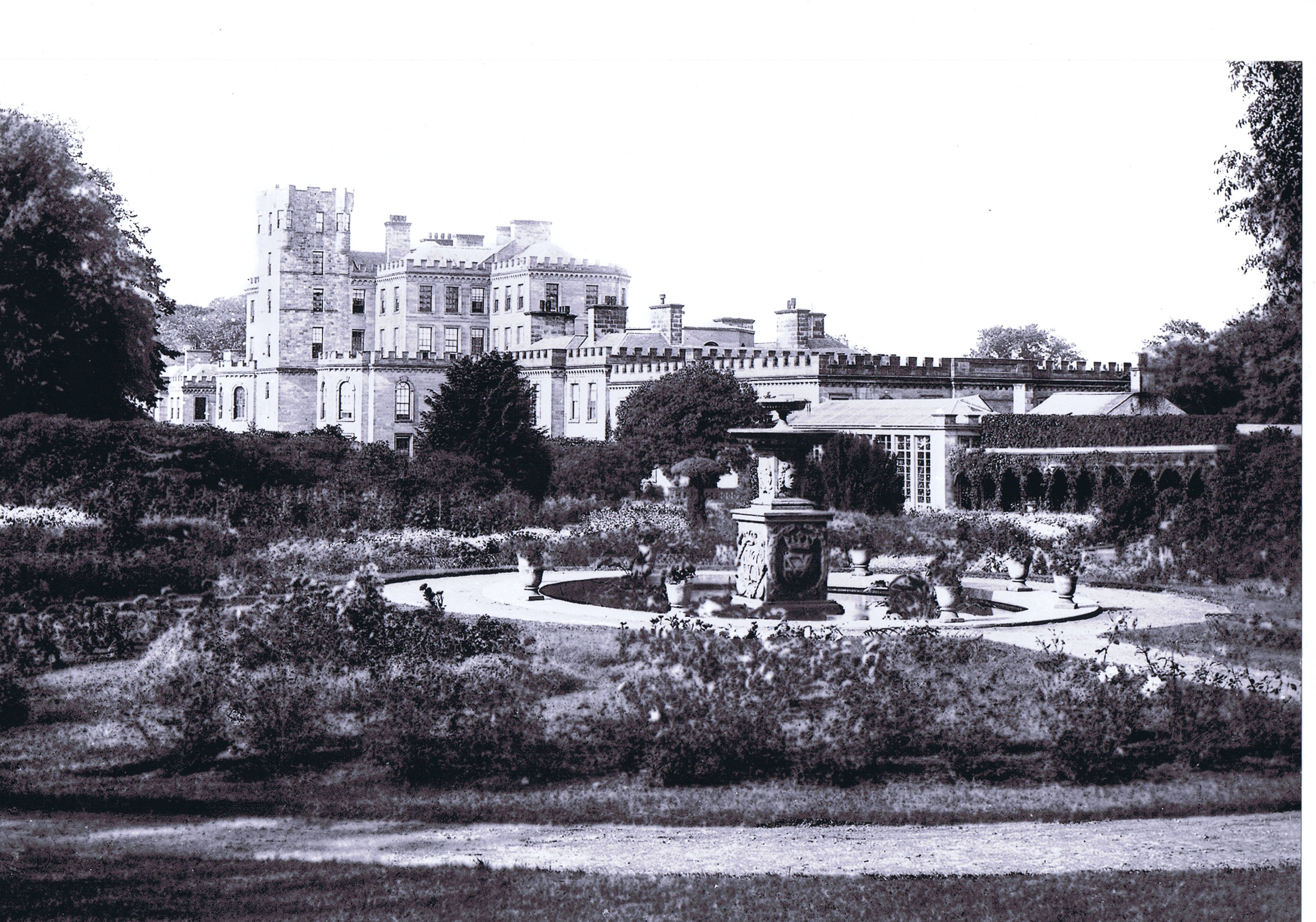
Gordon Castle and its formal gardens (1911)

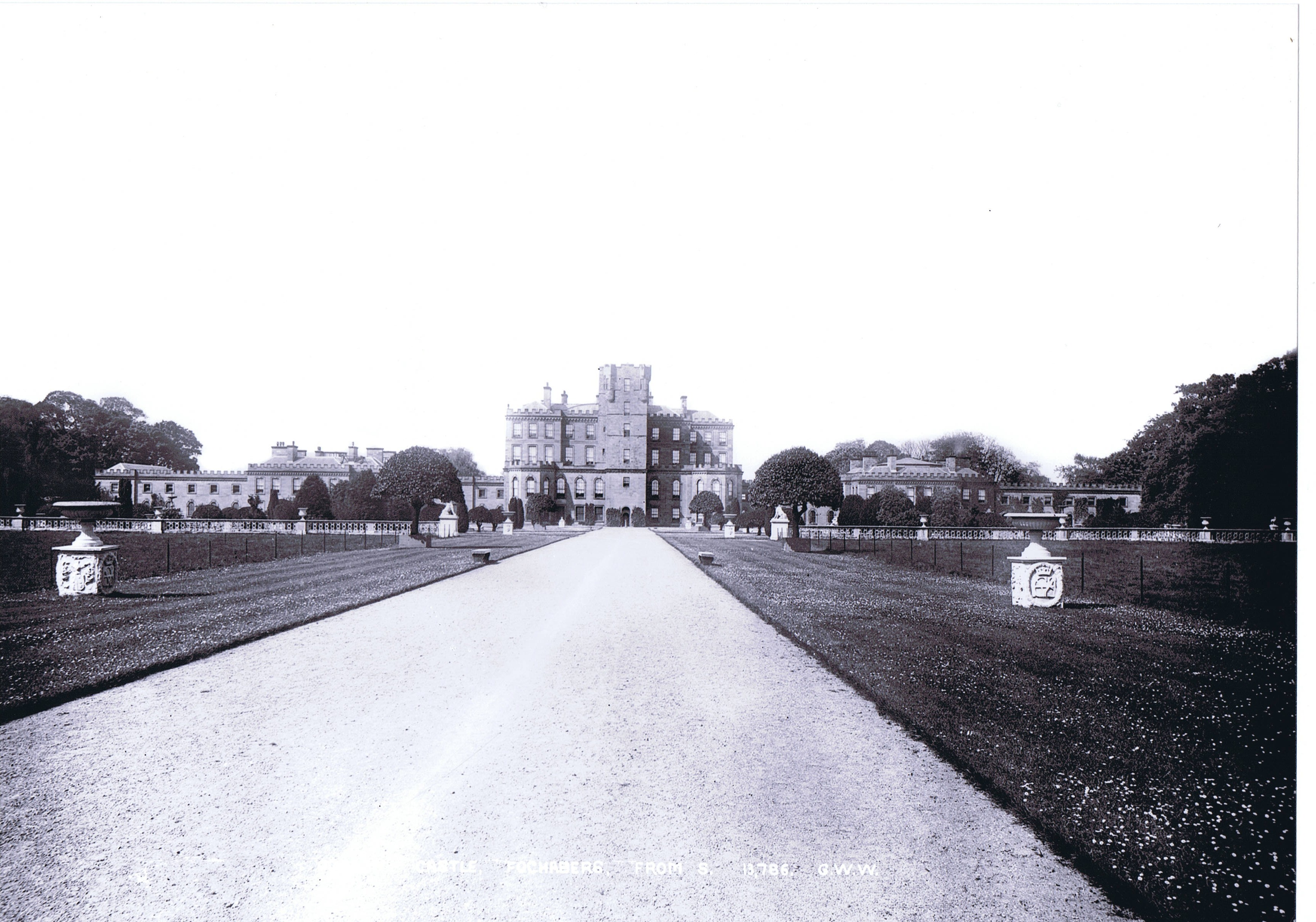
The south front

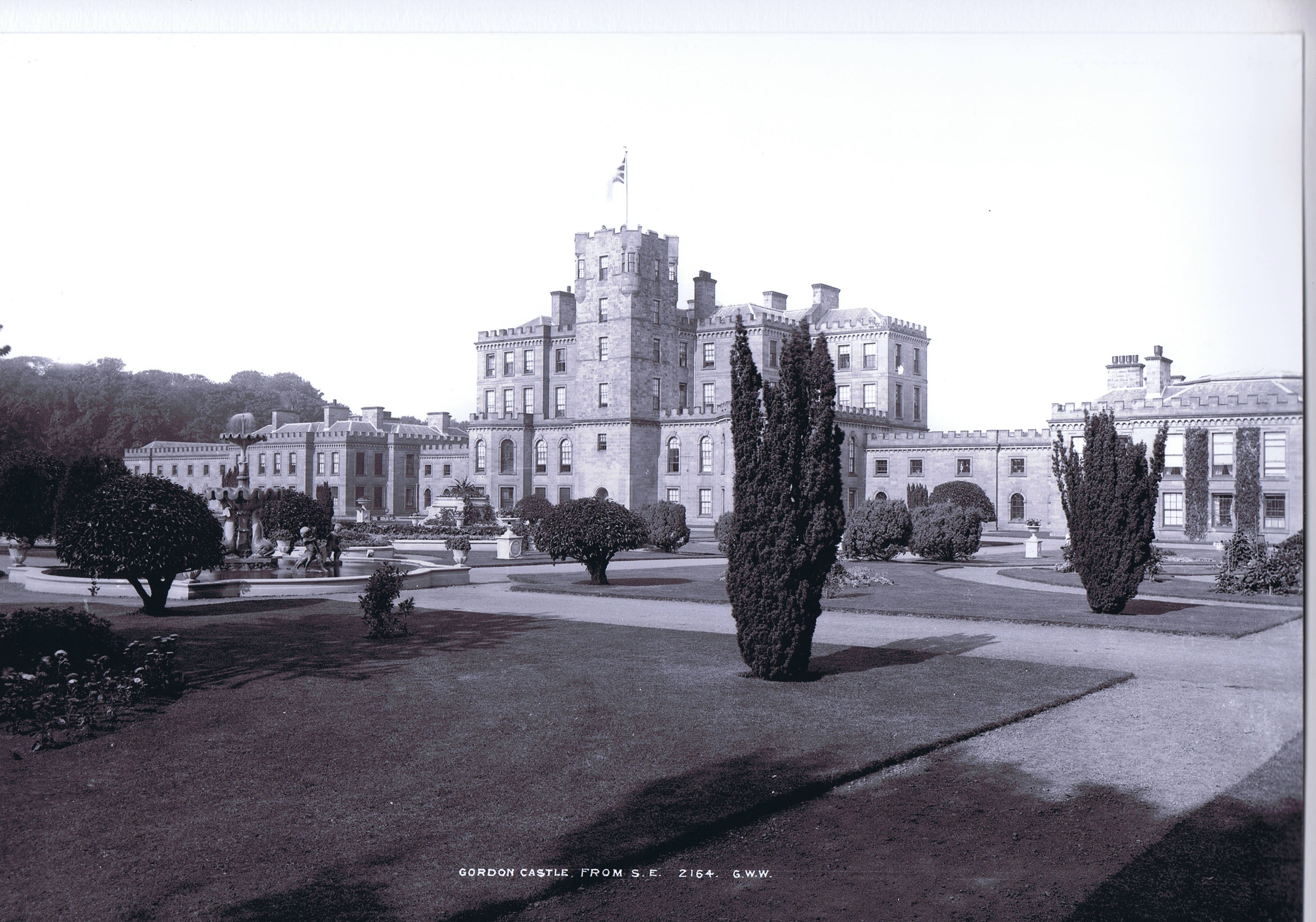
The Castle seen from the south east

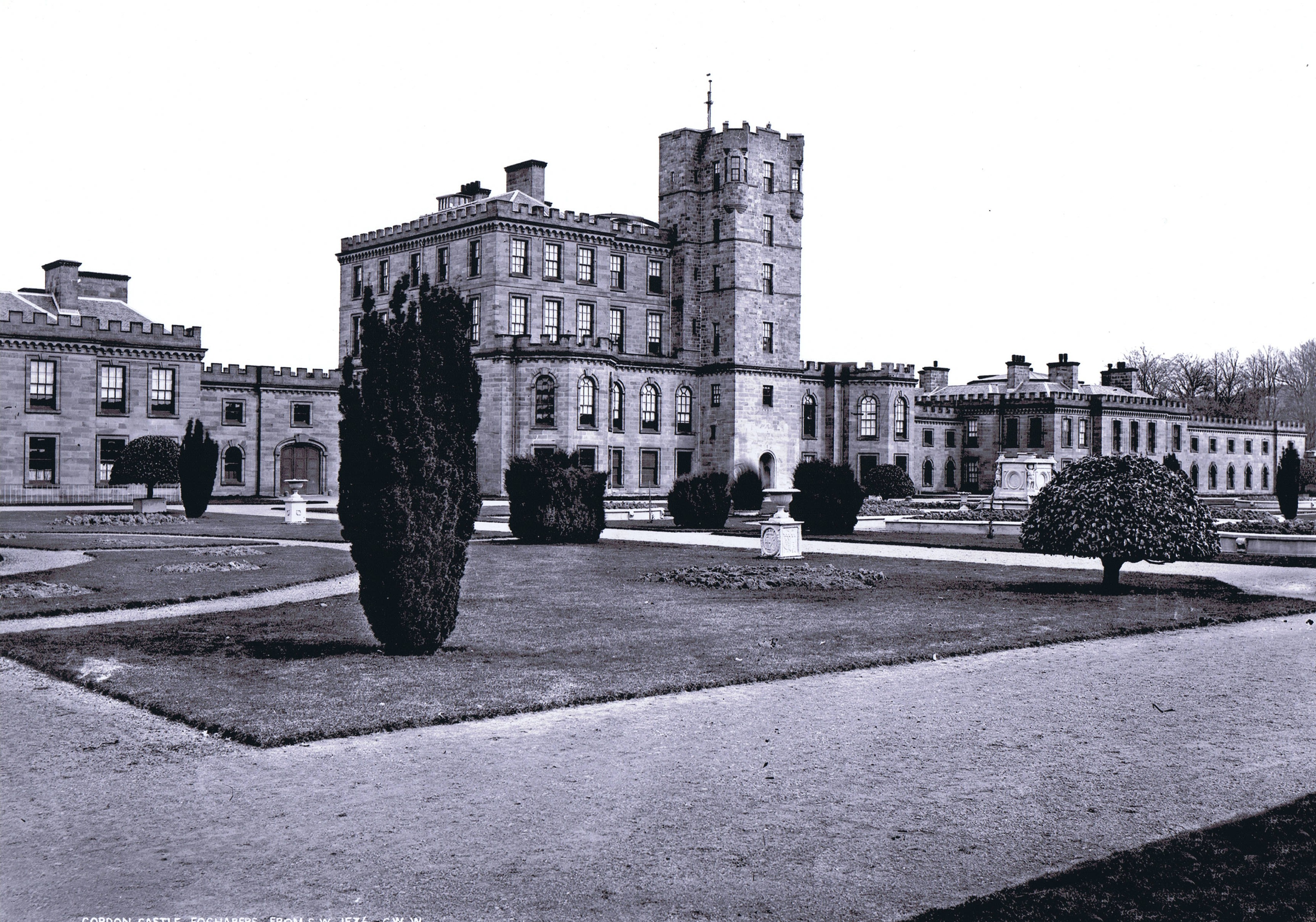
The Castle seen from the south west

=== War, decline and demolition (1914–1950s) ===
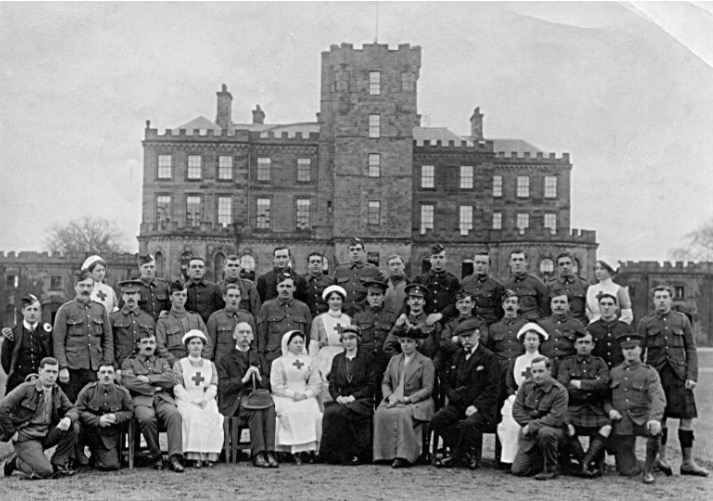
During the First World War the castle was used as a military hospital

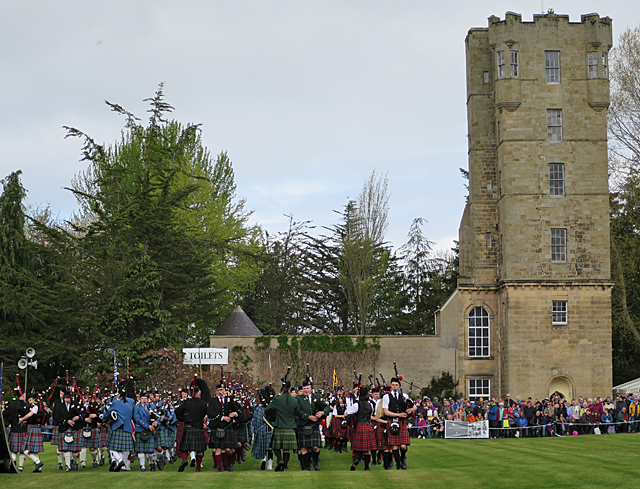
Gordon Castle during the 2016 Gordon Castle Highland Games

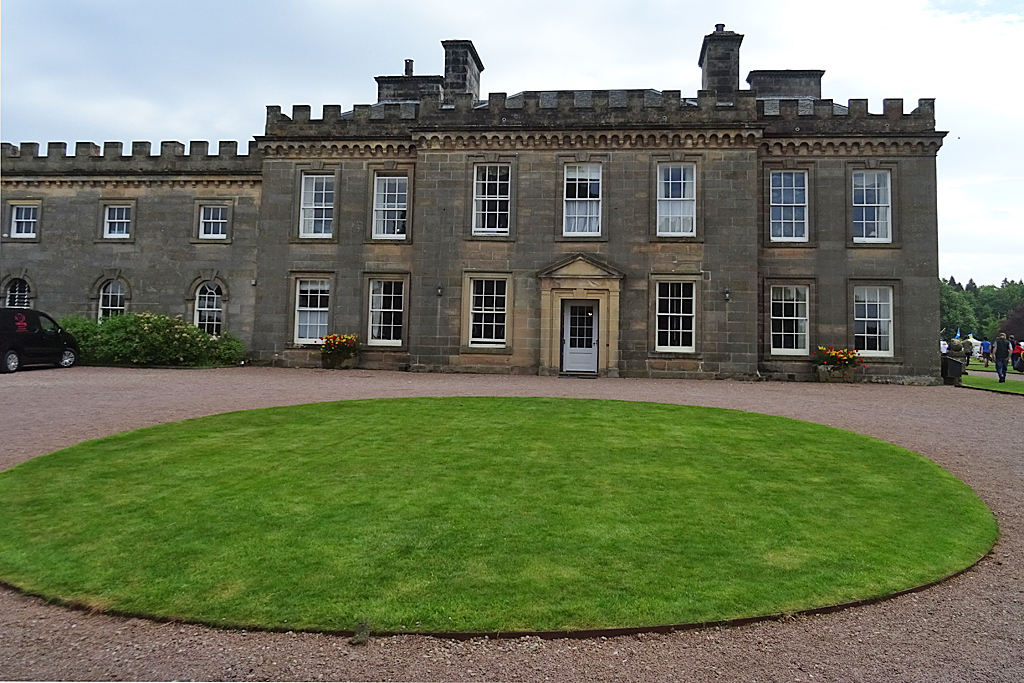
The remaining east wing of Gordon Castle (2022)

The First World War brought both service and loss. Gordon Castle was converted into a military hospital, treating many wounded Gordon Highlanders. The 7th Duke’s son, Lord Bernard Gordon-Lennox, was killed in action during the First Battle of Ypres in November 1914, aged 36, and his grandson, Lord Settrington, died in action in Russia in 1919, during the North Russia intervention. Though the family continued traditional gatherings such as the Highland Games, the social world of the pre-war estate never fully returned.

Charles Gordon-Lennox, 8th Duke of Richmond and Gordon (1928–1935) attempted to modernise the estate, but his premature death and double death duties forced his heir, Frederick, 9th Duke of Richmond and Gordon, to surrender Gordon Castle and its grounds to the Crown Estate in 1938. The majority of the contents of the castle were sold in 1937, although some family portraits and furniture were removed to Goodwood House.

During the Second World War, the castle was occupied by troops; the years of military use and harsh winters left the main structure gravely decayed. By the late 1940s, the central block suffered from dry rot and damp. In the early 1950s, Sir George (“Geordie”) Gordon-Lennox, son of Lord Bernard, repurchased the property from the Crown. He and his wife Nan made the painful decision to demolish the ruined central block, converting the east wing and medieval tower into a family home.

In the decades that followed, the family restored the link between castle and lineage. Sir George’s descendants—Major-General Bernard Gordon Lennox and later Angus and Zara Gordon Lennox—have continued the legacy, reviving the estate as a living enterprise centred on heritage, conservation, and the remarkable Walled Garden that once again forms the heart of Gordon Castle.

== Walled garden ==
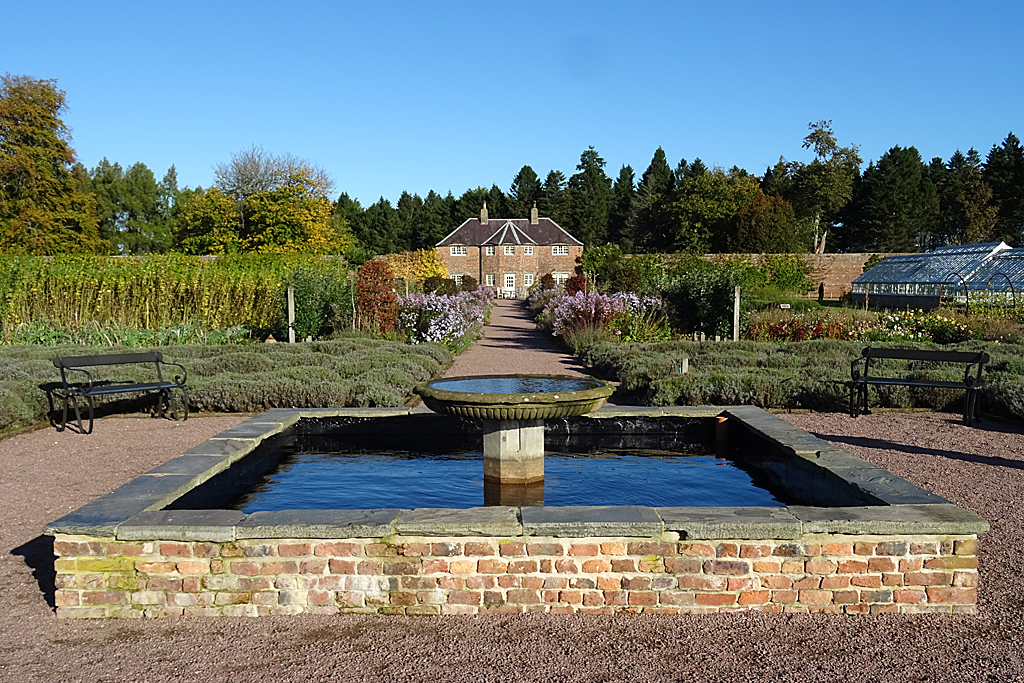
The Walled Garden in 2021

Designations

Inventory of Gardens and Designed Landscapes in Scotland
- Official name: Gordon Castle (Bog of Gight)
- Designated: 30 June 1987
- Reference no.: GDL00198

A walled garden has existed for centuries at Gordon Castle. The current one, built 1803–1804, replaced the old village of Fochabers, which was relocated southwards to open up the castle’s parkland. Built of stone brought from Burghead, it became one of the largest walled gardens in Scotland.

In the 19th century, under head gardeners John and Charles Webster, the garden achieved national fame for its orchards, espaliers, soft fruits, and flowers. A 1903 Gardeners' Magazine article praised its abundance and "skilful management". The Websters introduced varieties like The Gordon Castle Plum, Warner’s King, and Beauty of Moray, while glasshouses from Mackenzie & Moncur of Edinburgh produced exotic fruits.

After 1937, under Crown ownership, the garden was used for raspberry farming, then as low-maintenance grounds. When Sir George Gordon Lennox bought back the estate, he and his wife Nan continued market gardening until the 1980s.

Since 2008, Angus and Zara Gordon Lennox have led a major restoration with designer Arne Maynard, turning the garden into a productive and educational visitor attraction. It now combines heritage planting with contemporary design—vegetable and herb beds, fruit tunnels, children’s play areas, and a café—reviving its role as the heart of the estate. Produce from the garden now features in the estate’s restaurant and luxury product line, including Gordon Castle Gin. Red squirrels can at times be seen in the garden.

== A tour of Gordon Castle ==
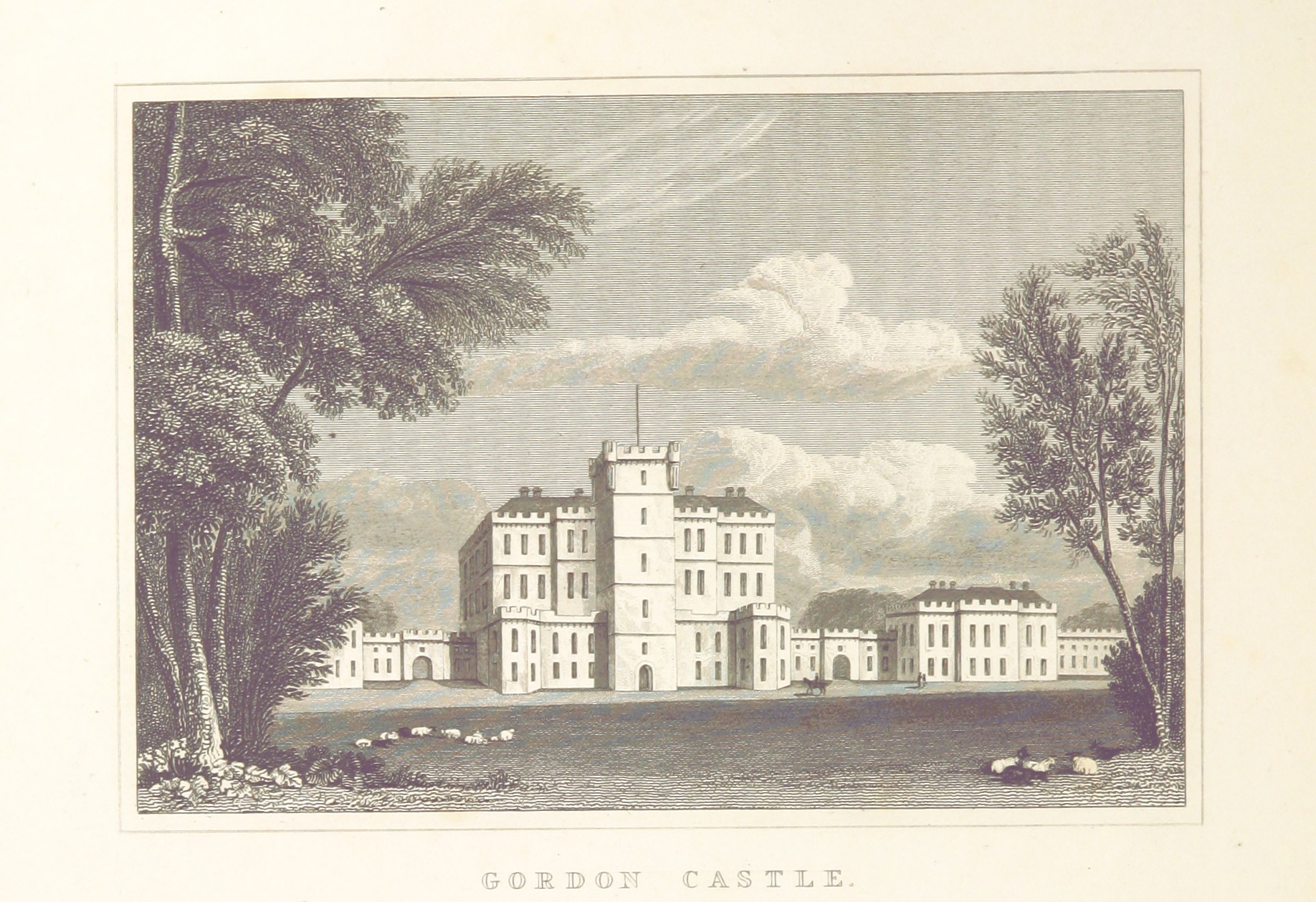
Gordon Castle as depicted in the Seats of Noblemen and Gentlemen

The description in the Views of the Seats of Noblemen and Gentlemen in England, Wales, Scotland and Ireland written by John Preston Neale in 1823 gives an impression how Gordon Castle looked from the inside in its heyday:

On the banks of the Spey, near Fochabers, surrounded by beautiful plantations, stands Gordon Castle, the magnificent residence of the Duke of Gordon. The castle was originally built by George, second Earl of Huntly, and altered and enlarged in every succeeding age. It has, of late years, been almost rebuilt by the present duke, in all the elegant magnificence of modern architecture. It extends in front to the length of 568 feet, from east to west; being, however, of different depth, the breaks make a variety of light and shade, which takes off the appearance of excess in uniformity.

The body of the building is of four stories, and in its southern front stands the tower entire of the original castle, by much ingenuity making a part of the modern mansion, and rising many feet above it. The wings are magnificent pavilions of two lofty stories, connected by galleries of two lower stories; and beyond the pavilions buildings are extended equally to either hand, of one floor and an attic story. The whole of this vast edifice, externally, is of white free stone, cut in the most elegant manner, and finished all around by a rich cornice and a handsome battlement.

The hall is embellished by a copy of the Apollo Belvidere, and of the Venus de Medicis, beautifully executed, of statuary marble, by Harwood. Here also, by the same ingenious statuary, are busts of Homer, Caracalla, M. Aurelius, Faustina, and a Vestal. At the bottom of the great staircase are busts of Julius Cæsar, Cicero, and Seneca, on marble pedestals. With these last stands a bust of Cosmo, the Third Duke of Tuscany, connected with the family of Gordon.

The first floor contains the dining room, drawing room, breakfast room, the state bed-chamber and dressing room, and several other elegant apartments. The sideboard is within the recess of the dining room, separated by lofty Corinthian columns of Scagliola, in imitation of verd antique marble. In this room are copies, by Angelica Kauffman, of Venus and Adonis, and of Danae by Titian; of Abraham and Hagar, of Joseph and Potiphar’s Wife by Guercino; of Dido and St Cecilia by Domenichino; besides several portraits.

In the drawing room is a portrait of the Duke of Gordon, by Raeburn, and of the Duchess, by Sir J. Reynolds, and some beautiful screens executed by the ladies. In the breakfast room is a copy, by A. Kauffman, of the celebrated St Peter and St Paul, the masterpiece of Guido Reni, esteemed the most valuable in the Lampiori Palace at Bologna, and one of the best paintings in the world.

The library is in the third, and the music room in the fourth floor, both directly over the dining room, and of the same dimensions. The library contains several thousand volumes, and is furnished with geographical and astronomical instruments. There is a folio manuscript of the Vulgate Bible, and two MS. Missals, elegantly illuminated. There is also a MS. of Bernard Gordon’s Lillium Medicinæ, with the date 1319, and the names of the copiers at the end.

The most remarkable pictures at Gordon Castle are a full length of James the Sixth, by Mytens. At the time of the Revolution the mob had taken it out of Holyrood House, and were kicking it about the streets, when the Chancellor, the Earl of Finlater, happening to pass by, redeemed it out of their hands. A portrait of James, Duke of Hamilton, beheaded in 1649, in a large black cloak with a star, by Vandyck; a half length of his brother, killed at the battle of Worcester, by the same artist; William, Duke of Hamilton, President of the Revolution Parliament, by Kneller; old Lord Banff, aged ninety, with a long white square beard.

On the highway between Fochabers and the Spey is the gate which leads to Gordon Castle, consisting of a lofty arch between two domes, elegantly finished. It is embellished by a handsome battlement within the gate. There is, besides this, another approach from the east, sweeping for several miles through the varied scenery of the park, which is nearly twelve square miles.

== Bibliography ==
- Neale, John Preston (1823). Views of the Seats of Noblemen and Gentlemen in England, Wales, Scotland and Ireland. Vol. 6. London.
- Gow, Ian (2006). "Gordon Castle Morayshire Once one of the Greatests Houses in the north of Scotland". Scotland's Lost Houses. London: Aurum Press. ISBN 9781845130510.
