= George Gordon-Lennox =

British Army general (1908–1988)

Lieutenant-General Sir George Gordon-Lennox KBE CB CVO DSO
- Born: George Charles Gordon-Lennox; 29 May 1908; Belgravia, London
- Died: 11 May 1988 (aged 79); Fochabers, Moray, Scotland
- Military career
- Allegiance: United Kingdom
- Branch: British Army
- Service years: 1928–1966
- Rank: Lieutenant-General
- Nickname: Geordie
- Service number: 39276
- Unit: Grenadier Guards
- Commands: Grenadier Guards; 1st Guards Brigade; 3rd Division; Royal Military College, Sandhurst; Scottish Command
- Conflicts: Second World War
- Awards: Knight Commander of the Order of the British Empire; Companion of the Order of the Bath; Commander of the Royal Victorian Order; Distinguished Service Order; Military Cross

Lieutenant-General Sir George "Geordie" Charles Gordon-Lennox KBE CB CVO DSO (29 May 1908 – 11 May 1988) was a senior British Army officer who served during the Second World War.

== Military career ==
Gordon-Lennox was born at 30 Wilton Crescent, Belgravia, the eldest son of Lord Bernard Gordon-Lennox and a grandson of the 7th Duke of Richmond. His mother was Hon. Evelyn Loch, daughter of Henry Loch, 1st Baron Loch. His younger brother was Rear-Admiral Sir Sandy Gordon-Lennox. Their father was killed at the Second Battle of Ypres in 1914.

He was educated at Eton and was a Page of Honour to George V from 1921–1924.

After Eton, he trained at Sandhurst and was commissioned into the Grenadier Guards in 1928.

He fought with the Grenadier Guards in the Second World War, in which he was wounded at the Battle of Anzio in 1944. He was awarded the DSO and mentioned in despatches.

In 1951, Gordon-Lennox was appointed commanding officer of the Grenadier Guards and in the 1952 Birthday Honours he was appointed a CVO. In 1952, he also became Commander of 1st Guards Brigade. He went on to be general officer commanding 3rd Division in 1959. He was appointed a Companion of the Order of the Bath (CB) in the 1959 New Year Honours. In 1960 he became Commandant of the Royal Military Academy Sandhurst and then Director-General of Military Training at the War Office in 1963. A year later, he was knighted (KCB) in the 1964 New Year Honours and transferred to Scotland where he was general officer commanding-in-chief of the Scottish Command and Governor of Edinburgh Castle until 1966.

In 1965, he became colonel of the Gordon Highlanders and his last post was in retirement, as King of Arms of the Order of the British Empire from 1968 until 1983.

== Family ==
Gordon-Lennox married Nancy Brenda Darell, daughter of Sir Lionel Darell, 6th Baronet, and they went on together to have two sons (the elder was Major-General Bernard Gordon Lennox).

Court offices
Preceded by Guy Dugdale	Page of Honour; 1921–1924	Succeeded by Edward Legge-Bourke
Military offices
Preceded by John Churcher	GOC 3rd Division; 1957–1959	Succeeded by Charles Harington
Preceded by Ronald Urquhart	Commandant of the Royal Military Academy Sandhurst; 1960–1963	Succeeded by John Mogg
Preceded by Sir William Turner	GOC-in-C Scottish Command; 1964–1966	Succeeded by Sir Derek Lang
Heraldic offices
Preceded by Sir Roderick Carr	King of Arms of the Order of the British Empire; 1968–1983	Succeeded by Sir Anthony Morton
