= Lord Esmé Gordon-Lennox =

Scottish aristocrat and British Army officer (1875–1949)

Brigadier-General Lord Esmé Gordon-Lennox KCVO CMG DSO DL
- Major Lord Esmé Gordon-Lennox, 1915
- Born: Hon. Esmé Charles Gordon-Lennox; 10 February 1875; Belgravia, London, England
- Died: 4 May 1949 (aged 74); Albury, Surrey, England
- Relatives: Charles Gordon-Lennox, 8th Duke of Richmond (brother); Lord Bernard Gordon-Lennox (brother); Helen Percy, Duchess of Northumberland (sister); Ewen Fergusson (son-in-law)
- Military career
- Allegiance: United Kingdom
- Branch: British Army
- Service years: 1896–1920
- Rank: Brigadier-General
- Unit: Scots Guards
- Conflicts: Second Boer War; World War I
- Awards: Royal Victorian Order; Distinguished Service Order; Order of St Michael and St George; Order of Saints Maurice and Lazarus

Brigadier-General Lord Esmé Charles Gordon-Lennox KCVO CMG DSO DL (10 February 1875 – 4 May 1949) was a British Army officer and public official.

== Early life and education ==
Hon. Esmé Gordon-Lennox was born at 3 Grosvenor Crescent, Belgravia into an ancient Scottish family, the second son of Charles, Earl of March and Amy Gordon-Lennox, Countess of March, daughter of Percy Ricardo, of Bramley Park, Guildford, Surrey.

Charles Gordon-Lennox, Lord Settrington (1870–1935) and Major Lord Bernard Gordon-Lennox (1878–1914) were his brothers. He also had two sisters, Lady Evelyn Amy Gordon-Lennox (1872–1922) and Lady Violet Mary Gordon-Lennox (1874–1946). His mother died in 1879 after a long illness.

In 1882, his father remarried to Isabel Sophie Craven and had two more daughters, Lady Muriel Beatrice Gordon-Lennox (1884–1969) and Lady Helen Magdalen Gordon-Lennox (1886–1965). His stepmother died in 1887, aged 24, and his father, who succeeded as 7th Duke of Richmond in 1903, never remarried.

He was educated at Eton College.

== Military career ==
Gordon-Lennox joined the British Army where he was commissioned a second lieutenant in the Scots Guards on 16 December 1896, and was promoted to lieutenant on 13 April 1898. He was seconded for service on the staff in March 1900, to serve as a staff officer in the Transvaal and the Orange River Colony during the Second Boer War, followed by service in Southern Nigeria. He was promoted from supernumary captain to captain in February 1904 and appointed a Member of the Royal Victorian Order (MVO) in 1907. He was promoted to major in May 1910.

Following the start of the First World War in August 1914, he rejoined his regiment and went to France with the British Expeditionary Force. His younger brother, Lord Bernard Gordon-Lennox, was killed early in the war at the Second Battle of Ypres. Lord Esmé was badly wounded and sent back to England in 1915 to recover.

Following a long convalescence, he returned to the front to command a brigade and was mentioned in dispatches. He was wounded again in 1917. He was awarded the D.S.O. in the 1918 New Year Honours and appointed a Commander of the Order of Saints Maurice and Lazarus. He was appointed a Companion of the Order of St Michael and St George in the 1919 New Year Honours.

In 1919, he was appointed head of the Scots Guards in London and lived in Eaton Square. He retired from the Army in 1920 with the honorary rank of brigadier-general.

== Public service ==
His Scottish residence was at Gordon Castle in Moray. In 1922, he was appointed Deputy Lieutenant of Banffshire.

In 1929, Lord Esmé began his role as Yeoman Usher of the Black Rod and secretary to three successive Lords Great Chamberlain: Viscount Lewisham (1929–1936), Marquess of Cholmondeley (1936), and the Earl of Ancaster. In 1946, he was forced to retire due to poor health and entered a nursing home.

He was appointed a Knight Commander of the Royal Victorian Order (KCVO) in the 1939 New Year Honours in recognition of his services to Parliament.

== Marriage and family ==
In 1909, Lord Esmé married the Hon. Hermione Frances Caroline Fellowes, third daughter of the 2nd Baron de Ramsey and his wife, Lady Rosamond Spencer-Churchill, daughter of the 7th Duke of Marlborough and aunt of Winston Churchill. They had one son:

- Captain Reginald Arthur Charles Gordon-Lennox (13 May 1910 – 30 August 1965), died in Salisbury, Rhodesia (now Zimbabwe). He had three children: Pamela, James, and Clare.

Following his first injury during the war, Lord Esmé drifted away from his wife and by 1919 was involved with someone else. In 1923, his wife sued him for divorce in an Edinburgh court on charges of desertion. She testified that in 1916:

...she noticed a distinct coldness in his manner, but attributed that to the war and his not being well. In 1917, while she and her husband were at Monte Carlo, he said he did not wish to live with her any more, and that they were very unsuited to each other. Later in that year he was again seriously wounded. When the witness saw him at the hospital he always contrived to have a member of his family there, and she never saw him alone. When he was convalescent they discussed the future, but he refused to entertain the idea of resuming their family life together.... he said he liked somebody else. He stated that he was not going back to [her], and the thing must end.

— The Times, 28 May 1923

Colonel North Dalrymple-Hamilton, who served with Lord Esmé in the Scots Guards, testified to the extent of his injuries. He explained that Lord Esmé "was fond of sport, but that since he was so badly wounded in the war there were not many sports open to him. He could just manage to fish, and that was almost all that was left to him." He did not respond to her petition. Lord Ashmore granted her the divorce and custody of their son.

They both remarried in January 1924. She married Olof Rudolf Cederström, Baron Cederström, the Swedish widower of Italian opera singer Adelina Patti, and he married Rosamund Lorys Palmer, daughter of Vice-Admiral Norman Craig Palmer.

They had two children:

- Norman Charles Gordon-Lennox (11 April 1927 – 12 April 1927), died in infancy
- Sara Carolyn Gordon-Lennox (born 12 May 1933), baptised in the crypt of the Palace of Westminster, married Sir Ewen Fergusson. They were the parents of Ewen Alexander Nicholas Fergusson.

He died at his home at Weston Lea, Albury, Surrey. The Scots Guard band played at his memorial service at Guards' Chapel, Wellington Barracks.

His widow died in 1961.
