= Amy Gordon-Lennox, Countess of March =

The Right Honourable The Countess of March
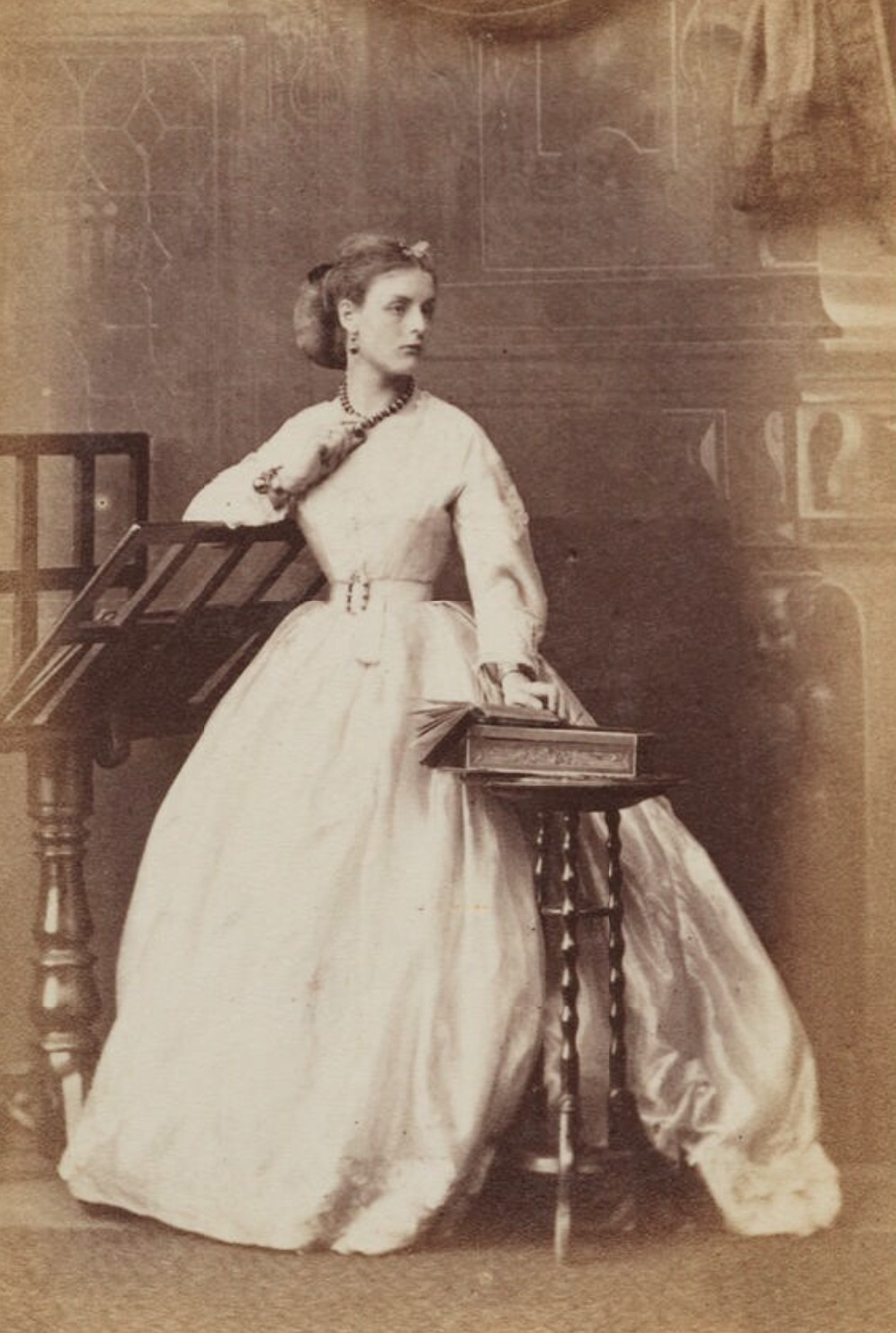
- Amy Ricardo, 1866, by Camille Silvy
- Born: Amy Mary Ricardo; 24 June 1847; Paddington, London
- Died: 23 August 1879 (aged 32); Belgravia, London
- Spouse: Charles Gordon-Lennox, Earl of March (m. 1868)
- Children: Charles Gordon-Lennox, 8th Duke of Richmond; Lady Evelyn Cotterell; Violet Brassey, Baroness Brassey; Lord Esmé Gordon-Lennox; Lord Bernard Gordon-Lennox
- Parent(s): Percy Ricardo; Matilda Mawdesley Hensley
- Relatives: Horace Ricardo (brother); F. C. Ricardo (brother)

Amy Mary Gordon-Lennox, Countess of March (née Ricardo; 24 June 1847 – 23 August 1879) was an English peeress from the Ricardo family. She was the first wife of Charles Gordon-Lennox, 7th Duke of Richmond, and the mother of Charles Gordon-Lennox, 8th Duke of Richmond. She died before her husband inherited the dukedom.

== Early life ==
Amy was born at 5 Westbourne Crescent in Tyburnia, Paddington, the daughter of stockbroker Percy Ricardo (1820–1892) of Bramley Park, Guildford, Surrey, and his wife, the former Matilda Mawdesley Hensley (1826–1880), herself the daughter of John Isaac Hensley of Holborn in Middlesex. Among her siblings were sister Ellen Maud Ricardo (wife of Sir Hervey Bruce, 4th Baronet) and brothers Colonel Horace Ricardo and Colonel F. C. Ricardo.

== Personal life ==
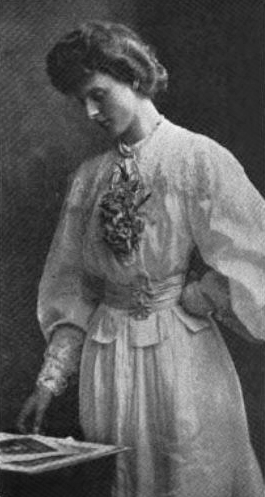
Portrait of her eldest daughter, Lady Evelyn Gordon-Lennox, from The Sketch, Vol. XLIII, No. 549, 5 August 1903

On 10 November 1868, Amy married Charles Gordon-Lennox, the future duke, who then went by his courtesy title Earl of March. He was the eldest son of Charles Henry Gordon-Lennox, 6th Duke of Richmond and former Frances Harriett Greville. They had five children before her death in 1879:

- Charles Gordon-Lennox, 8th Duke of Richmond (1870–1935), who married Hilda Madeline Brassey, eldest surviving daughter of Henry Arthur Brassey, MP, of Preston Hall, and had children.
- Lady Evelyn Amy Gordon-Lennox (1872–1922), who married Sir John Richard Geers Cotterell, 4th Baronet, and had children.
- Lady Violet Mary Gordon-Lennox (1874–1946), who married Major Henry Brassey, 1st Baron Brassey of Apethorpe, and had children
- Brigadier-General Lord Esmé Gordon-Lennox (1875–1949), who married, first, the Hon. Hermione Frances Caroline Fellowes, and second, Rosamond Lorys Palmer, and had children from both marriages
- Major Lord Bernard Gordon-Lennox (1878–1914), who married Hon. Evelyn Loch, second daughter of Henry Loch, 1st Baron Loch, and had children; he was killed in action during the First World War.

In August 1879, following a "lingering and painful illness" Lady March died at the family's Belgravia home at 3 Grosvenor Crescent.

Her husband remarried Isabel Sophie Craven in 1882, and had further children. Isabel died in November 1887, and the duke thereafter remained a widower until his death in 1928.

=== Published works ===
In 1877, the countess compiled and published a catalogue of the artworks held at the family homes, Goodwood House and Gordon Castle.
