= F. C. Ricardo =

British Army officer

Colonel F. C. Ricardo CVO CBE
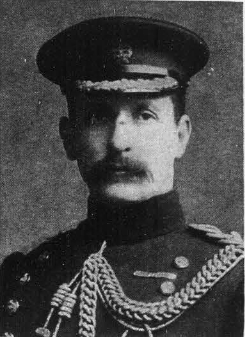
- Ricardo in 1909
- Born: Francis Cecil Ricardo; 3 July 1852; Bramley Park, Guildford, Surrey, England
- Died: 17 June 1924 (aged 71); Lullebrook Manor, Odney Island, Cookham, Berkshire, England
- Education: Eton College
- Occupation: British Army officer
- Spouse: Marie Annie Littlefield (m. 1894; died 1907)
- Parent(s): Percy Ricardo; Matilda Mawdesley Hensley
- Relatives: Amy Gordon-Lennox, Countess of March (sister); Horace Ricardo (brother)

Colonel Francis Cecil Ricardo, CVO, CBE (3 July 1852 – 17 June 1924) was a British Army officer, police officer, and philanthropist.

== Early life ==
Ricardo was born at Bramley Park at Guildford in Surrey, the son of Percy Ricardo (1820–1892) and his wife, Matilda Mawdesley Hensley (1826–1880), the daughter of John Isaac Hensley of Holborn in Middlesex. He was the brother of both Col. Horace Ricardo and of Amy Gordon-Lennox, Countess of March (wife of Charles Gordon-Lennox before he became the 7th Duke of Richmond). He was educated at Eton College and followed his older brother, Horace, into the Grenadier Guards as a sub-lieutenant in September 1872.

== Career ==
He was promoted to captain on 8 June 1884, to major on 10 December 1890, and to lieutenant-colonel on 10 February 1897. In January 1900, he received a staff appointment as an assistant adjutant-general for the Home District, with the temporary rank of colonel whilst so employed. He was promoted to the substantive rank of colonel on 1 January 1903.

While serving in the Home District, he was involved with organising troops during the Coronation of King Edward VII and Queen Alexandra in August 1902. For this service, Ricardo (who was already a Member of the Royal Victorian Order (MVO)) was invested as Commander of the Royal Victorian Order (CVO) by King Edward VII two days after the ceremony, on 11 August 1902.

He was later aide-de-camp to the Lord Lieutenant of Ireland, and retired from the Army in 1909.

In 1899 he became honorary secretary of the Naval and Military Tournament and held the post until 1910, when he resigned following a disagreement with the Army Council over some of the content. In 1909 he was one of the founders of Temple Links, a golf course in Berkshire.

In 1910, Ricardo became honorary colonel of the First Aid Nursing Yeomanry following the resignation of its founder, Edward Baker.

He served as High Sheriff of Berkshire twice, in 1894 and 1913.

During the First World War he served as acting chief constable of Berkshire County Constabulary.

He was appointed Commander of the Order of the British Empire (CBE) for his police work in the 1920 civilian war honours.

He was a great philanthropist and set up a reading in room in the village of Cookham in 1911, by purchasing the old Wesleyan Chapel, when a new larger one was built. He named it the King's Hall after George V. On his death in 1924, he left a legacy of £814 2s 0d to pay for the maintenance of the Hall.

In 1963, the hall was taken over by the Stanley Spencer Gallery.

== Personal life ==
In 1894 Ricardo married Marie Annie Littlefield, a daughter of T. Littlefield. She died in 1907.

He collapsed and died suddenly on 17 June 1924 while walking with his niece in the garden of his house, Lullebrook Manor on Odney Island at Cookham in Berkshire.

=== Legacy ===
Ricardo was said to have been Kenneth Grahame's inspiration for Toad of Toad Hall in the 1908 children's book The Wind in the Willows, as he drove round the village in a yellow Rolls-Royce and would offer lifts to any residents he saw.
