= Lord Bernard Gordon-Lennox =

British Army officer (1878–1914)

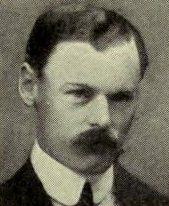
- Born: 1 May 1878; Belgravia, London, England
- Died: 10 November 1914 (aged 36); Ypres, Belgium
- Relatives: Sir George Gordon-Lennox (son); Sir Alexander Gordon-Lennox (son)
- Military career
- Allegiance: United Kingdom
- Branch: British Army
- Service years: 1898–1914
- Rank: Major
- Unit: Grenadier Guards
- Conflicts: Second Boer War; World War I

Major Lord Bernard Charles Gordon-Lennox (1 May 1878 – 10 November 1914), was a British Army officer who was killed in the First World War.

== Early life ==
Gordon-Lennox was born at 3 Grosvenor Crescent, Belgravia, the third son of Charles Gordon-Lennox, 7th Duke of Richmond, by his first wife Amy Mary Ricardo, daughter of Percy Ricardo, of Bramley Park, Guildford, Surrey. Charles Gordon-Lennox, 8th Duke of Richmond and Brigadier-General Lord Esmé Gordon-Lennox were his elder brothers. He was educated at Eton and the Royal Military College, Sandhurst.

== Career ==
Gordon-Lennox was a major in the Grenadier Guards and served in the Second Boer War, in China, and in World War I, where he was killed in action during the First Battle of Ypres in November 1914, aged 36. He was buried in Zillebeke Churchyard Commonwealth War Graves Commission Cemetery.

Gordon-Lennox appeared in a single first-class cricket match for Middlesex against Gloucestershire in the 1903 County Championship.

== Personal life ==
Gordon-Lennox married Hon. Evelyn, daughter of Henry Loch, 1st Baron Loch, in 1907. They had two sons:.

- Lieutenant-General Sir George "Geordie" Gordon-Lennox
- Rear-Admiral Sir Alexander "Sandy" Gordon-Lennox

Lady Bernard Gordon-Lennox remained a widow until her death in June 1944, during the Second World War, aged 67, when a V-1 flying bomb hit the Guards' Chapel, Wellington Barracks.

=== Memorial windows ===
There is are stained-glass windows dedicated to him at the Gordon Chapel in Fochabers, Scotland and Boxgrove Priory church, West Sussex, England.

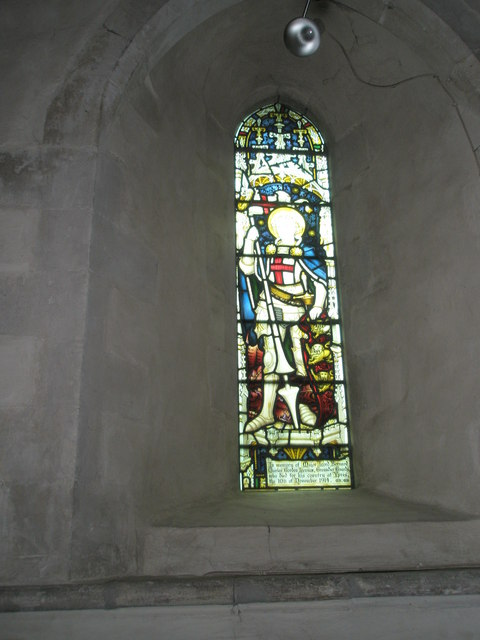
Maj B. C. Gordon-Lennox memorial window, Boxgrove Priory

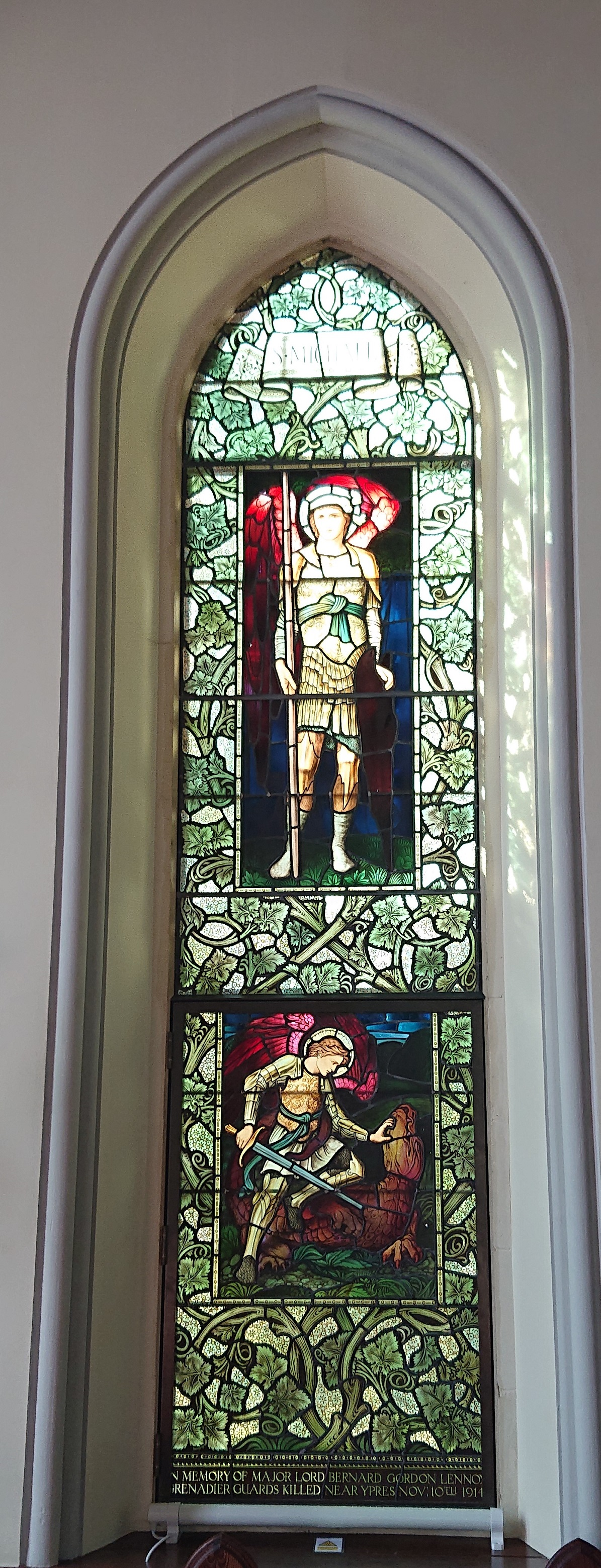
Memorial window, Gordon Chapel
