= Horace Ricardo =

Colonel Horace Ricardo CVO
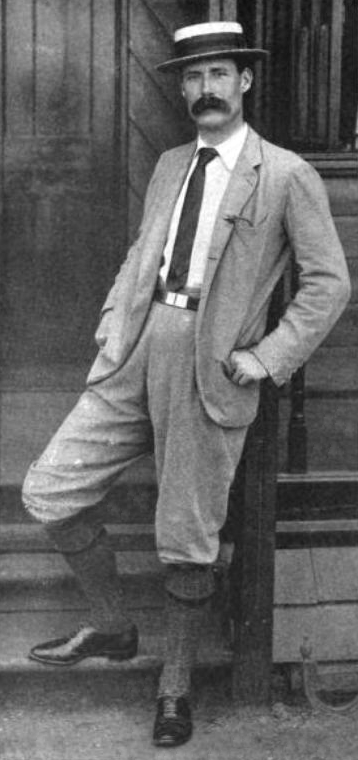
- In The Sketch, 18 February 1903
- Born: 28 September 1850; London
- Died: 11 April 1935 (aged 84); Guildford
- Education: Eton College
- Spouse: Henrietta Goulburn
- Children: 3
- Relatives: Percy Ricardo and Matilda Mawdesley Hensley
- Military career
- Branch: British Army
- Rank: Colonel
- Unit: Grenadier Guards
- Conflicts: Suakin Expedition
- Awards: Commander of the Royal Victorian Order

Colonel Horace Ricardo, CVO (28 September 1850 – 11 April 1935) was a British Army officer and land owner.

== Biography ==
Ricardo was born London, the son of Percy Ricardo (1820–1892) and his wife, Matilda Mawdesley Hensley (1826–1880), daughter of John Isaac Hensley of Holborn in Middlesex. He was the brother of Colonel Francis Ricardo (1852–1924), Amy Gordon-Lennox, Countess of March (1847–1879) and Ellen Maud, Lady Bruce, of Downhill (1848–1924). He was educated at Eton College.

Ricardo was commissioned into the Grenadier Guards as an ensign and lieutenant (by purchase) on 17 April 1869, and was promoted to captain on 17 May 1871. He served as adjutant of the 3rd battalion from 11 March 1874 to 1877. Promoted to lieutenant-colonel on 24 May 1879, he served in the Suakin Expedition in Sudan in 1885, for which he received the medal and Khedive's star. He received the rank of colonel on 29 January 1888. From 1894 to 1898 he was commanding officer of the 2nd battalion. After a brief period on half-pay, he was on 8 November 1899 appointed Colonel in Command of the Grenadier Guards and the regimental district, and served as such until 1904. These years saw the death of Queen Victoria and the accession of her son King Edward VII. Ricardo was Field Officer in Waiting during the funeral of the Queen in February 1901, and took part in the coronation of the new king in August 1902. He was placed on half-pay on 8 November 1904, and resigned from the army on 28 September 1907.

He was appointed a Commander of the Royal Victorian Order (CVO) by King Edward VII in March 1901, following his recent accession.

He owned Bramley Park in Guildford, Surrey, was a Justice of the peace for the county, and was appointed a Deputy Lieutenant for the county on 15 June 1906.

He died at Bramley Park on 11 April 1935.

== Family ==
Ricardo married in 1877 Henrietta Goulburn, daughter of Colonel E. Goulburn, also of the Grenadier Guards. They had three daughters, including Winifred Maud Ricardo who married in 1904 Major-General Sir Charles Edward Corkran (1872–1939).
