= Charles Gordon-Lennox, 7th Duke of Richmond =

British politician and peer (1845–1928)

His Grace The Duke of Richmond KG GCVO CB
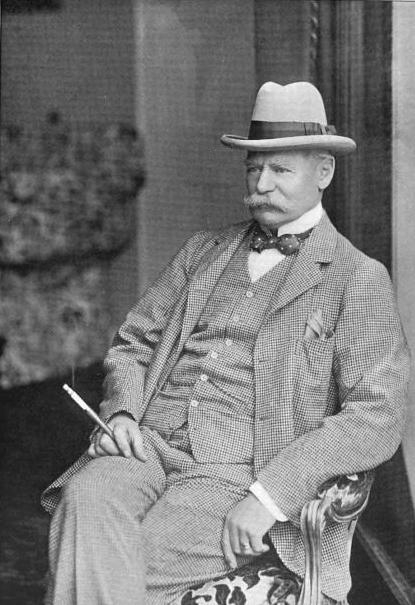
- Photograph of Lord Richmond, 1907

Member of Parliament for Chichester
- In office 1885–1889
- Preceded by: Lord Henry Lennox; John Abel Smith
- Succeeded by: Lord Walter Gordon-Lennox

Member of Parliament for West Sussex
- In office 1869–1885 Serving with Sir Walter Barttelot, Bt
- Preceded by: Hon. Henry Wyndham; Sir Walter Barttelot, Bt
- Succeeded by: Constituency divided

Personal details
- Born: Charles Henry Gordon-Lennox; 27 December 1845 Portland Place, London
- Died: 18 January 1928 (aged 82) London
- Spouses: Amy Mary Ricardo (m. 1868; died 1879) Isabel Sophie Craven (m. 1882; died 1887)
- Children: 7, including Charles, Esmé, and Bernard
- Parent(s): Charles Gordon-Lennox, 6th Duke of Richmond; Frances Harriett
- Education: Eton College

Military service
- Branch/service: Grenadier Guards; Royal Sussex Light Infantry Militia; Royal Sussex Regiment
- Rank: Lt-Col Commandant
- Battles/wars: Second Boer War

Charles Henry Gordon-Lennox, 7th Duke of Richmond, 2nd Duke of Gordon (27 December 1845 – 18 January 1928), styled Lord Settrington until 1860 and Earl of March between 1860 and 1903, was a British politician and peer.

== Early life ==
Styled Lord Settrington from birth, he was born at Portland Place, London, on 27 December 1845. He was the eldest son of Charles Henry Gordon-Lennox, 6th Duke of Richmond and Frances Harriett Greville (1824–1887). His elder sister, Lady Caroline Gordon-Lennox, who never married, acted as chatelaine of Goodwood after their mother's death in 1887. His younger siblings were Lord Algernon Gordon-Lennox (who married Blanche Maynard and was the father of Ivy Cavendish-Bentinck, Duchess of Portland), Capt. Lord Francis Gordon-Lennox (who died unmarried), Lady Florence Gordon-Lennox (who died unmarried), and Lord Walter Gordon-Lennox (who married Alice Ogilvie-Grant).

His paternal grandparents were Charles Gordon-Lennox, 5th Duke of Richmond, and Lady Caroline Paget (eldest daughter of Henry Paget, 1st Marquess of Anglesey, and Lady Caroline Elizabeth Villiers, a daughter of George Villiers, 4th Earl of Jersey). His maternal grandparents were Algernon Greville (second son of Captain Charles Greville and Lady Charlotte Cavendish-Bentinck, eldest daughter of William Cavendish-Bentinck, 3rd Duke of Portland) and the former Charlotte Cox (a daughter of Richard Henry Cox, of Hillingdon).

In his youth, he visited America on a hunting trip to the Rocky Mountains, spending the winter in a log cabin. He was educated at Eton between 1859 and 1863. In 1860 he became known as the Earl of March after his father succeeded to the dukedom.

== Career ==
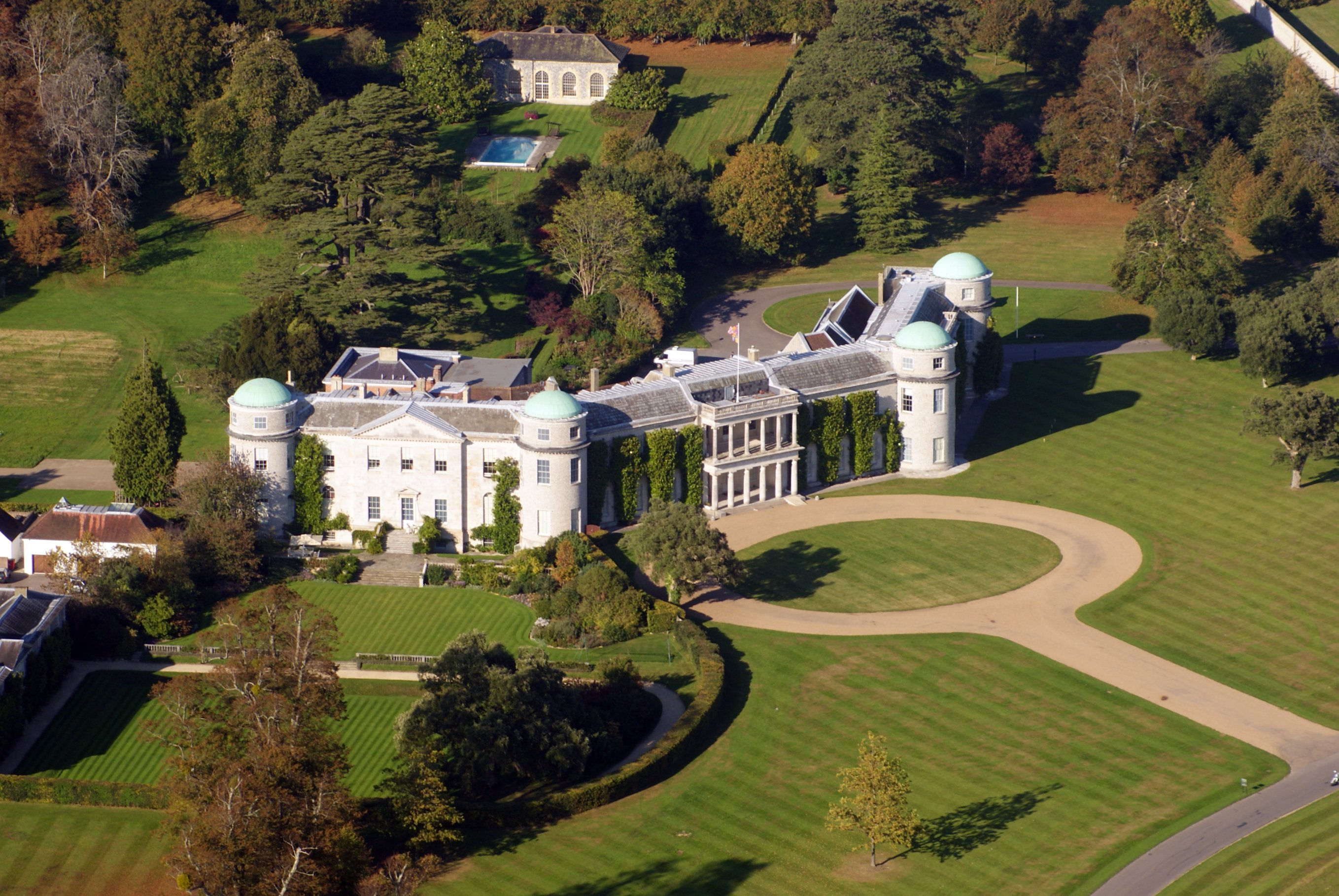
Grand house in the South Downs, the main home of the Dukes, in a few square kilometres of land. Both remain in the family, see Goodwood House.

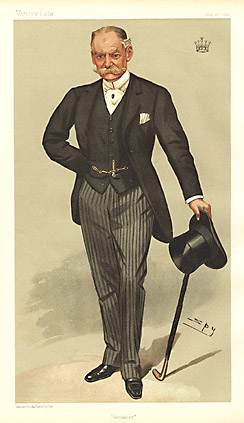
"Goodwood". Caricature by Spy published in Vanity Fair in 1896

Lord March joined the Grenadier Guards two years later, although he retired in 1869 after he was elected Member of Parliament for West Sussex. He represented that constituency until it was abolished for the 1885 general election, when he was returned to the House of Commons for the Chichester constituency. He held his seat until 1889. Around this time, he was appointed as an Ecclesiastical Commissioner, a position he occupied until 1903.

He served in the part-time Royal Sussex Light Infantry Militia, being promoted to lieutenant-colonel in command of its 2nd Battalion on 28 June 1876. The regiment became the 3rd (Militia) Battalion of the Royal Sussex Regiment in 1881, and March was appointed its Lt-Col Commandant on 9 July 1887. March and his brother, Lord Algernon Gordon-Lennox, both served in the Second Boer War, with March commanding his battalion in South Africa from its arrival in March 1901 until its return to England in June 1902 following the Peace of Vereeniging. For his service in the war, he was appointed a Companion of the Order of the Bath (CB) in the October 1902 South African Honours list.

Lord March was appointed Lord Lieutenant of Elginshire on 27 August 1902, and also served as Lord Lieutenant of Banffshire from November 1903, after his father's death.

On 27 September 1903, Gordon-Lennox succeeded his father as 7th Duke of Richmond and Lennox and 2nd Duke of Gordon (2nd creation) as well as the dukedom of Aubigny, which had been conferred on his ancestor Louise de Kérouaille, Duchess of Portsmouth, by French King Louis XIV. In 1904, King Edward VII made him a Knight Grand Cross of the Royal Victorian Order (GCVO) and a Knight Companion of the Order of the Garter (KG). He was Grand Master of the Sussex branch of the Freemasons from 1902. After his retirement from the militia, he was appointed honorary colonel of his battalion on 27 May 1906.

== Personal life ==
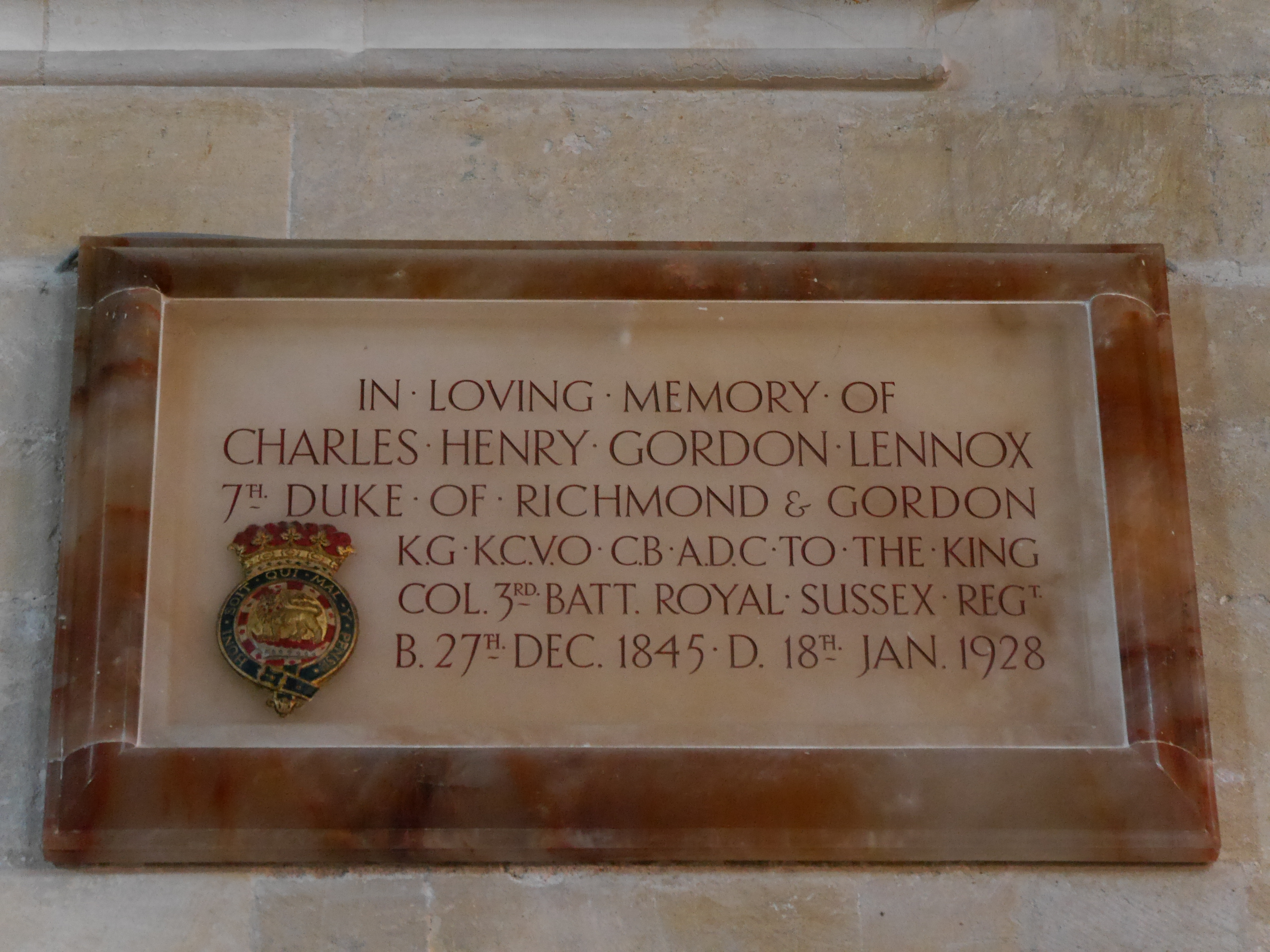
Memorial, Chichester Cathedral

The Duke of Richmond was twice married. His first marriage was on 10 November 1868 to Amy Mary Ricardo (1847–1879), daughter of Percy Ricardo, Esq. of Bramley Park, Surrey. She was the sister of Col. Horace Ricardo and of Col. Francis Ricardo. Before her death on 23 August 1879, aged 32, they had three sons and two daughters:

- Charles Henry Gordon-Lennox, 8th Duke of Richmond (1870–1935), who married Hilda Madeline Brassey, eldest surviving daughter of Henry Brassey, MP, of Preston Hall, in 1893.
- Lady Evelyn Amy Gordon-Lennox (1872–1922), who married Sir John Cotterell, 4th Baronet, in 1896. They were the parents of Sir Richard Cotterell, 5th Baronet.
- Lady Violet Mary Gordon-Lennox (1874–1946), who married Henry Brassey, 1st Baron Brassey of Apethorpe, in 1894.
- Lord Esmé Charles Gordon-Lennox (1875–1949), a brigadier-general in the British Army who was Yeoman Usher of the Black Rod and Secretary to the Lord Great Chamberlain; he married Hon. Hermione Frances Caroline Fellowes, third daughter of William Fellowes, 2nd Baron de Ramsey, in 1909. They divorced in 1923 and he married Rosamond Lorys Palmer, daughter of Vice Admiral Norman Craig Palmer, in 1923.
- Lord Bernard Charles Gordon-Lennox (1878–1914), a major in the British Army who married Hon. Evelyn Loch, second daughter of Henry Loch, 1st Baron Loch, in 1907.

On 3 July 1882, he married Isabel Sophie Craven, second daughter of William George Craven (a grandson of William Craven, 1st Earl of Craven) and Lady Mary Yorke (second daughter of Charles Yorke, 4th Earl of Hardwicke). They had two daughters:

- Lady Muriel Beatrice Gordon-Lennox (3 October 1884 – 13 April 1969), who married Major William Malebisse Beckwith, only son of Captain Henry John Beckwith, of Millichope Park, in 1904. They divorced in 1933 and she married, on 2 August 1933, Commander Lewis Derek Jones, of Newton House, eldest son of Major-General Lewis Jones, of Stoke Lodge, Stoke Poges, in 1933.
- Lady Helen Magdalen Gordon-Lennox (1886–1965), Mistress of the Robes to Queen Elizabeth The Queen Mother; she married Alan Percy, 8th Duke of Northumberland, in 1911.

The Duchess of Richmond died in November 1887, aged 24. The duke remained a widower until his death in London on 18 January 1928, aged 82. He was buried in Chichester Cathedral and was succeeded in the dukedom by his eldest son, Charles.

=== Estate ===
The duke died with assets excluding family-entrusted land such as at Goodwood House where he lived (and as his forebears was a parochial and district patron). These were probated at £310,380 (equivalent to £16,859,000 in 2025). His interests in the family-entrusted lands were proved at £1731 in 1929. In 1930, the 8th Duke was forced to sell "a considerable number of pictures and books from Goodwood House and Gordon Castle, his Scottish seat near Fochabers" due to the "heavy succession duties and increasing taxation".

== Ancestry ==
Ancestors of Charles Gordon-Lennox, 7th Duke of Richmond

8. Charles Lennox, 4th Duke of Richmond
4. Charles Lennox, 5th Duke of Richmond
9. Lady Charlotte Gordon
2. Charles Gordon-Lennox, 6th Duke of Richmond
10. Henry Paget, 1st Marquess of Anglesey
5. Lady Caroline Paget
11. Lady Caroline Villiers
1. Charles Gordon-Lennox, 7th Duke of Richmond
12. Charles Greville
6. Algernon Greville
13. Lady Charlotte Cavendish-Bentinck
3. Frances Greville
14. Richard Cox
7. Charlotte Cox
15. Charlotte Fitzhugh

Parliament of the United Kingdom
Preceded by Hon. Henry Wyndham; Sir Walter Barttelot	Member of Parliament for West Sussex; 1869–1885; With: Sir Walter Barttelot	Constituency divided
Preceded by Lord Henry Lennox; John Abel Smith	Member of Parliament for Chichester; 1885–1889	Succeeded by Lord Walter Gordon-Lennox
Academic offices
Preceded by The Earl of Elgin and Kincardine	Chancellor of the University of Aberdeen; 1917–1928	Succeeded by The Lord Meston
Honorary titles
Preceded by The Duke of Fife	Lord Lieutenant of Elginshire; 1902–1928	Succeeded by The Duke of Richmond
Preceded by The Duke of Richmond	Lord Lieutenant of Banffshire; 1903–1928	Succeeded by Sir John Findlay
Peerage of England
Preceded by Charles Gordon-Lennox	Duke of Richmond; 3rd creation 1903–1928	Succeeded by Charles Gordon-Lennox
Peerage of Scotland
Preceded by Charles Gordon-Lennox	Duke of Lennox; 2nd creation 1903–1928	Succeeded by Charles Gordon-Lennox
Peerage of the United Kingdom
Preceded by Charles Gordon-Lennox	Duke of Gordon; 2nd creation 1903–1928	Succeeded by Charles Gordon-Lennox
French nobility
Preceded by Charles Gordon-Lennox	Duke of Aubigny; 1903–1928	Succeeded by Charles Gordon-Lennox
