= Victor Gordon-Lennox =

British soldier and journalist (1897–1968)

- Born: Victor Charles Hugh Gordon-Lennox; 10 September 1897; Chelsea, London
- Died: 25 January 1968 (aged 70); Sinnington, Yorkshire
- Other name: V. C. H. Gordon-Lennox
- Education: Trinity College, Cambridge
- Occupation: Journalist
- Notable work: The Whitehall Letter
- Spouse(s): Ann Dorothy Bridge (m. 1923; div. 1928) Diana Kingsmill (m. 1932; div. 1940) Norah Schofield (m. 1958)
- Military career
- Allegiance: United Kingdom
- Branch: British Army
- Service years: 1915–1922
- Rank: Captain
- Unit: Grenadier Guards
- Conflicts: World War I

Capt. Victor Charles Hugh Gordon-Lennox (10 September 1897 – 25 January 1968) was a British Army soldier and journalist who was a diplomatic correspondent for The Daily Mail and The Daily Telegraph. In the lead-up to the Second World War, he was an editor of the influential conservative newsletter The Whitehall Letter.

== Early life and education ==
Gordon-Lennox was born at 23 Lower Sloane St., Chelsea, London, into the Scottish aristocracy, the only child of politician Lord Walter Gordon-Lennox and his wife, Alice Ogilvy-Grant. His father was the youngest son of the 6th Duke of Richmond; his mother was the daughter of the Hon. George Henry Ogilvy-Grant and granddaughter of Francis Ogilvy-Grant, 6th Earl of Seafield.

He was educated privately and at Trinity College, Cambridge.

== Career ==
=== Military ===
In 1915, during First World War, Gordon-Lennox left Cambridge and enlisted in the 5th (Reserve) Battalion of the Grenadier Guards, and later served with the 1st Battalion. His uncle Major Lord Bernard Gordon-Lennox was killed in 1914 while serving in the same regiment. On 20 November 1916, two days after the Battle of the Somme ended, he was injured in the trenches east of Gueudecourt while his battalion was awaiting relief from the 59th Battalion. He then returned to action. In 1917, he served as aide-de-camp to Anthony Gustav de Rothschild of the Buckinghamshire Yeomanry and later to Lieutenant-General Sir John Du Cane.

After the war, he was military secretary to Lieutenant-General Sir Richard Haking at Danzig. He retired in 1922.

=== Journalism ===
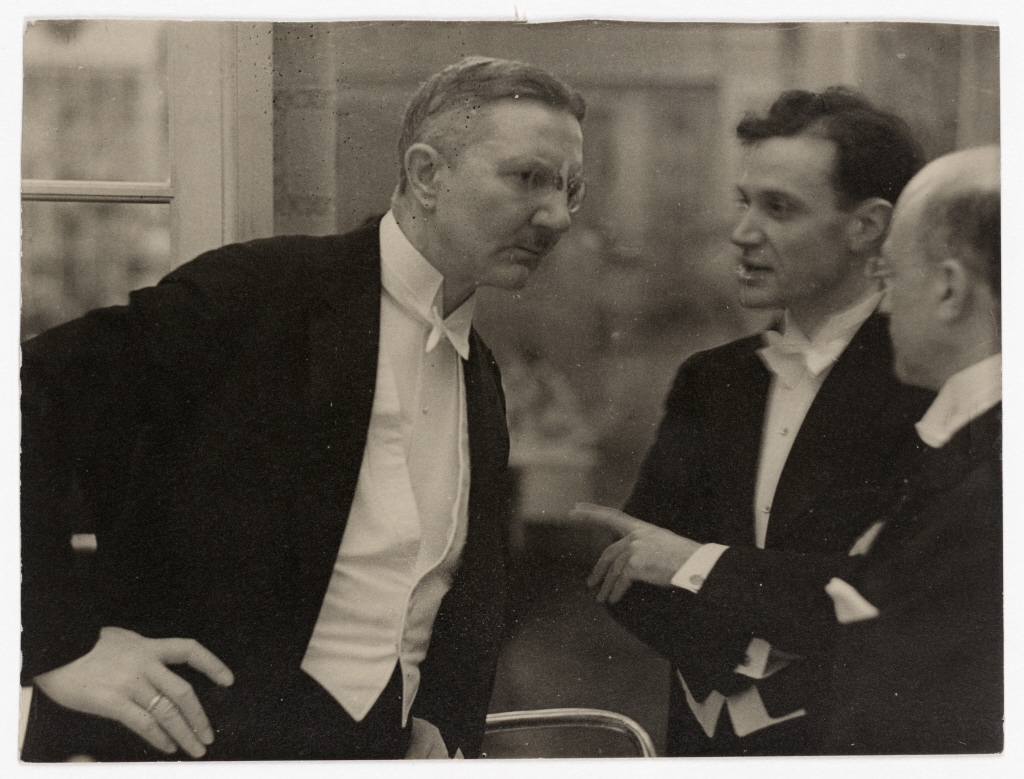
Hjalmar Schacht and Gordon-Lennox at the 80th birthday celebration of historian Hans Delbrück in Berlin, November 1928.

From 1923–9, Gordon-Lennox was The Daily Mail's political correspondent. From 1930–4, he was the diplomatic correspondent of The Daily Telegraph, for which he wrote a "London Day by Day" column under the pseudonym Peterborough. In the 1930s, he, Graham Hutton, and American Helen Kirkpatrick edited a weekly anonymous newsletter The Whitehall Letter, which The Times called "one of the best informed of 'behind the scenes' information sheets" in politics. Critical of Prime Minister Neville Chamberlain's policy of appeasement toward Nazi Germany, The Whitehall Letter offered an alternative to establishment media's unwavering support of Chamberlain. It was regularly read by future Prime Ministers Winston Churchill and Anthony Eden; King Gustaf V of Sweden was also a subscriber.

According to The Times's obituary, he possessed "a knack of getting hold of something that others had missed. Gordon-Lennox was a well-liked character not only in what used to be loosely called "club-land" but in many countries. His distinguished appearance, the width of his contacts, his immense personal charm, made him stand out among journalists of his period."

== Personal life ==
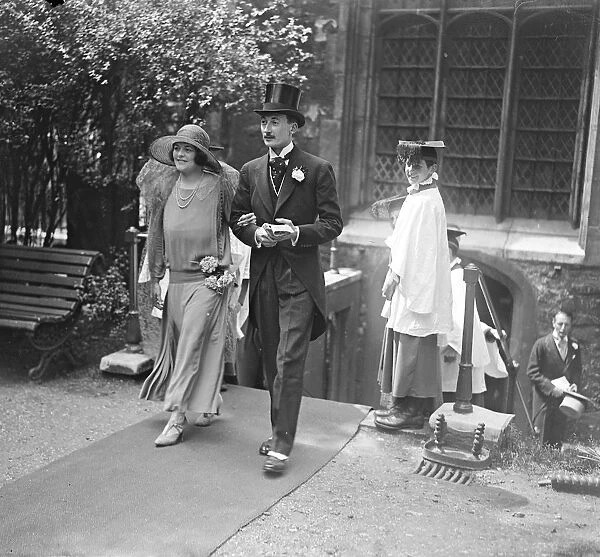
Victor Gordon-Lennox and Mrs Dorothy Bridge following their marriage at the Savoy Chapel, July 1923

Gordon-Lennox married three times. From 1923–28, he was married to Ann Dorothy Bridge (née Browne). In 1928, she remarried to Sir George Edward Leon, 2nd Baronet.

In December 1932, he married Canadian athlete and journalist Diana Kingsmill, daughter of Admiral Sir Charles Kingsmill, in Rockcliffe Park, Ottawa. They met in Ottawa that summer while he was reporting on the British Empire Economic Conference for The Telegraph. They had a son, Henry George Charles Gordon-Lennox (born 1934), an official with the UNHCR. They were divorced in 1940. She remarried J. F. C. Wright.

In 1958, he married Norah Schofield, daughter of newspaper editor Guy Schofield.

An avid motorist, Gordon-Lennox owned one of the few Bentley 8 Litres produced. In the 1930s, he purchased the 1927 Bentley 3 Litre belonging to his friend David Niven, which gave Niven the funds he needed to leave the army and become an actor.

He died in 1968 in Sinnington, Yorkshire.
