= Charles Kingsmill =

Canadian Royal Navy and Royal Canadian Navy Admiral (1855–1935)

Admiral Sir Charles Kingsmill CMG
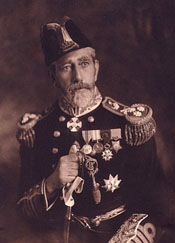
- Born: Charles Edmund Kingsmill; 7 July 1855; Guelph, Canada West (now Ontario)
- Died: 15 July 1935 (aged 80); Portland, Ontario, Canada
- Military career
- Allegiance: United Kingdom (1870–1908); Canada (1909–1921)
- Branch: Royal Navy; Royal Canadian Navy
- Service years: 1870–1921
- Rank: Admiral
- Commands: HMS Cormorant; HMS Goldfinch; HMS Blenheim; HMS Archer; HMS Mildura; HMS Scylla; HMS Majestic; HMS Dominion; HMS Repulse
- Conflicts: Anglo-Sudanese War; Somaliland Campaign; First World War: U-boat Campaign
- Awards: Knight Bachelor; Companion of the Order of St Michael and St George; Officer of the Legion of Honour (France); Grand Officer of the Order of the Crown of Italy

Admiral Sir Charles Edmund Kingsmill, CMG (7 July 1855 – 15 July 1935) was a Canadian-born naval officer and the first director of the Department of the Naval Service of Canada. After retiring from a career in the Royal Navy, he played a prominent role in the establishment of the Canadian Naval Service in 1910. Along with Rear-Admiral Walter Hose, he is considered the father of the Royal Canadian Navy.

== Early life an education ==
Kingsmill was born at Guelph, Canada West (now Ontario) in 1855. He was the son of John Juchereau Kingsmill, Crown Attorney for Wellington County, and Ellen Diana Grange. He was educated at Upper Canada College in Toronto.

== Royal Navy career ==
In 1870, at age 14, Kingsmill joined the Royal Navy as a midshipman. He was promoted sub-lieutenant in 1875, lieutenant in 1877, commander in 1891, and captain in 1898. During his career in the Royal Navy, he commanded HM Ships Goldfinch (1890–1891), Blenheim (1895), Archer (1895–1898), Gibraltar (1900), Mildura (1900–1903), Resolution, Majestic (1905–1906), and Dominion.

Mildura served on the Australia Station in these years. During Kingsmill's command of the ship, she was part of the naval escort for the visit of the Duke and Duchess of Cornwall and York (later King George V and Queen Mary) to New Zealand aboard the chartered Royal liner HMS Ophir during 1901. The following year, he was with HMS Royal Arthur (flagship) and HMS Pylades, visiting Norfolk Island in July, Suva, Fiji in August, and Tonga in September.

Kingsmill was given command of the battleship Dominion after her launching in 1905. Dominion ran aground in Chaleur Bay on 16 or 19 August 1906, while on a good-will tour of the Canadian Atlantic coast. In his March 1907 court-martial, Kingsmill was severely reprimanded for "grave neglect of duty" (not being on the bridge at the time) and given command of the older battleship HMS Repulse.

== Royal Canadian Navy ==
In 1908, Kingsmill retired from the Royal Navy and returned to Canada. He was appointed honorary aide-de-camp to His Excellency the Governor-General in 1909. At the behest of then prime minister Wilfrid Laurier, he accepted the post of director of the Marine Service in the Department of Marine and Fisheries under then Minister of Marine and Fisheries Louis-Philippe Brodeur. The appointment predetermined his eventual appointment as rear-admiral and director of the Naval Service of Canada upon the formation of The Canadian Naval Service on 4 May 1910. King George V designated Canada's naval forces as the Royal Canadian Navy (RCN) on August 29, 1911.By 1914, at the beginning of World War I, the new navy's fleet consisted of two old cruisers and a collection of converted civilian and commercial vessels.

In 1913, he was promoted on the British Royal Navy’s retired list to vice-admiral,then to full admiral in 1917. He was made a knight bachelor in 1918. He was awarded for outstanding services as the Director of Naval Services of Canada 1910–1921.

Kingsmill retired on 31 December 1921. He maintained a summer home on Grindstone Island, in Big Rideau Lake, near Portland, Ontario, where he loved to sail. His guests included the Duke of Devonshire, Governor General of Canada from 1916 to 1921; Sir William MacKenzie, railway entrepreneur; and Neville Chamberlain, later Prime Minister of the United Kingdom from 1937–1940. When he died at Grindstone Island on 15 July 1935, a "huge flotilla of boats brought him in from the island"

Kingsmill is buried in the Anglican cemetery in Portland, where an Ontario Heritage Trust plaque commemorates his contribution to Canadian naval history.

== Family ==
Kingsmill and his wife, Constance, were prominent figures in Ottawa's social life. She was active in various causes, including as a supporter of birth control. They lived in a large stone house which they named "Ballybeg" on Crescent Road in Rockcliffe, which was designed for them during World War I by Montreal architect H. C. Stone. When the house was built, Rockcliffe was outside city limits, and raising chickens and cattle was permitted. Since 1970, the house has been occupied by Tunisia's ambassadors to Canada.

Kingsmill's cousin, Colonel Walter Bernard Kingsmill, the son of Admiral Kingsmill's uncle, Nicol Kingsmill, was head of the 10th Royal Grenadiers and led the 123rd Battalion on the front lines in France during the First World War.

Kingsmill's daughter Diana was an Olympic athlete and journalist, who married historian J. F. C. Wright.

== Legacy ==
Kingsmill House is named for him. The junior officer quarters building at Venture NOTC, the Canadian Naval Officer Training Centre, is named after him.

== Footnotes ==
Military offices
New title	Director of the Naval Service; 1910–1921	Succeeded by Walter Hose
