= Gordon-Lennox =

Gordon-Lennox is a Scottish aristocratic family descended from Charles Gordon-Lennox, 5th Duke of Richmond. It may refer to:

- Lord Alexander Gordon-Lennox (1825–1892), British politician
- Alexander Gordon-Lennox (Royal Navy officer), Royal Navy officer
- Lord Algernon Gordon-Lennox (1847–1921), British Army officer
- Augusta Katherine Gordon-Lennox (1827–1904), British aristocrat
- Bernard Gordon Lennox (1932–2017), British Army officer
- Lord Bernard Gordon-Lennox (1878–1914), British Army officer
- Charles Gordon-Lennox, multiple people
- Cosmo Gordon-Lennox (1869–1921), British actor
- Lord Esmé Gordon-Lennox (1875–1949), British Army officer and public official
- Frederick Gordon-Lennox, 9th Duke of Richmond (1904–1989)
- Lord George Gordon-Lennox (1829–1877), British politician
- George Gordon-Lennox (1908–1988), British Army officer
- Lord Henry Gordon-Lennox (1821–1886), British politician
- Hilda Gordon-Lennox, Duchess of Richmond (1872–1971), British aristocrat
- Ivy Gordon-Lennox (1887–1982), Duchess of Portland
- Lord Nicholas Gordon-Lennox (1931–2004), British diplomat
- Nimmy March (born Lady Naomi Gordon-Lennox, 1962), English actress
- Victor Gordon-Lennox (1897–1968), British journalist
- Lord Walter Gordon-Lennox (1865–1922), British politician

== See also ==
- Gordon (surname)
- Lennox (surname)
