= HMS Pylades (1884) =

Sloop of the Royal Navy

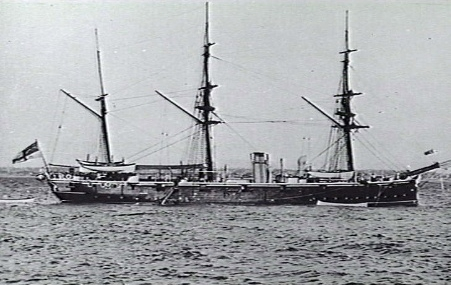
- HMS Pylades anchored at Hobsons Bay, Port Phillip c. 1895.

History

United Kingdom
- Name: HMS Pylades
- Namesake: Pylades
- Builder: Sheerness Dockyard
- Laid down: 1 January 1883
- Launched: 5 November 1884
- Commissioned: 17 November 1884
- Fate: Sold on 3 April 1906 for breaking up

General characteristics
- Class & type: Satellite-class sloop
- Displacement: 1,420 tons
- Length: 200 ft (61 m) pp
- Beam: 38 ft (12 m)
- Draught: 15 ft 9 in (4.80 m)
- Installed power: 1,470 ihp (1,096 kW)
- Propulsion: Single horizontal compound-expansion steam engine; Single screw
- Sail plan: Barque-rigged
- Range: Approximately 6,000 nmi (11,000 km) at 10 kn (19 km/h)
- Complement: 170–200
- Armament: Eight BL 6-inch/100-pounder (81cwt) Mk II guns; One light gun; Four machine guns
- Armour: Internal steel deck over machinery and magazines

HMS Pylades was a Satellite-class composite screw sloop of the Royal Navy, built at Sheerness Dockyard and launched on 5 November 1884. She was later reclassified as a corvette and was the last corvette built for the Royal Navy until the Second World War.

== Service history ==
Initially on service with the North America and West Indies Station, she commenced service on the Australia Station in November 1894. From 30 May to 10 August 1896, she toured through the Solomon Islands with Charles Morris Woodford, who had been appointed the Resident Commissioner of the Solomon Islands under the jurisdiction of the Western Pacific High Commission.

Commander Robert Hornby was appointed in command in September 1901. In the same month Pylades was despatched to Ocean Island to annex the island as a British protectorate. The following year she was with HMS Royal Arthur (flagship) and HMS Mildura when she visited Norfolk Island in July, and Suva, Fiji in August, then paid a visit to Gilbert Islands on her own. Commander Herbert Charles da Costa was appointed in command from 3 January 1903. She left the Australia Station on 29 January 1905. She was sold to Cohen of Felixstowe for breaking on 3 April 1906.

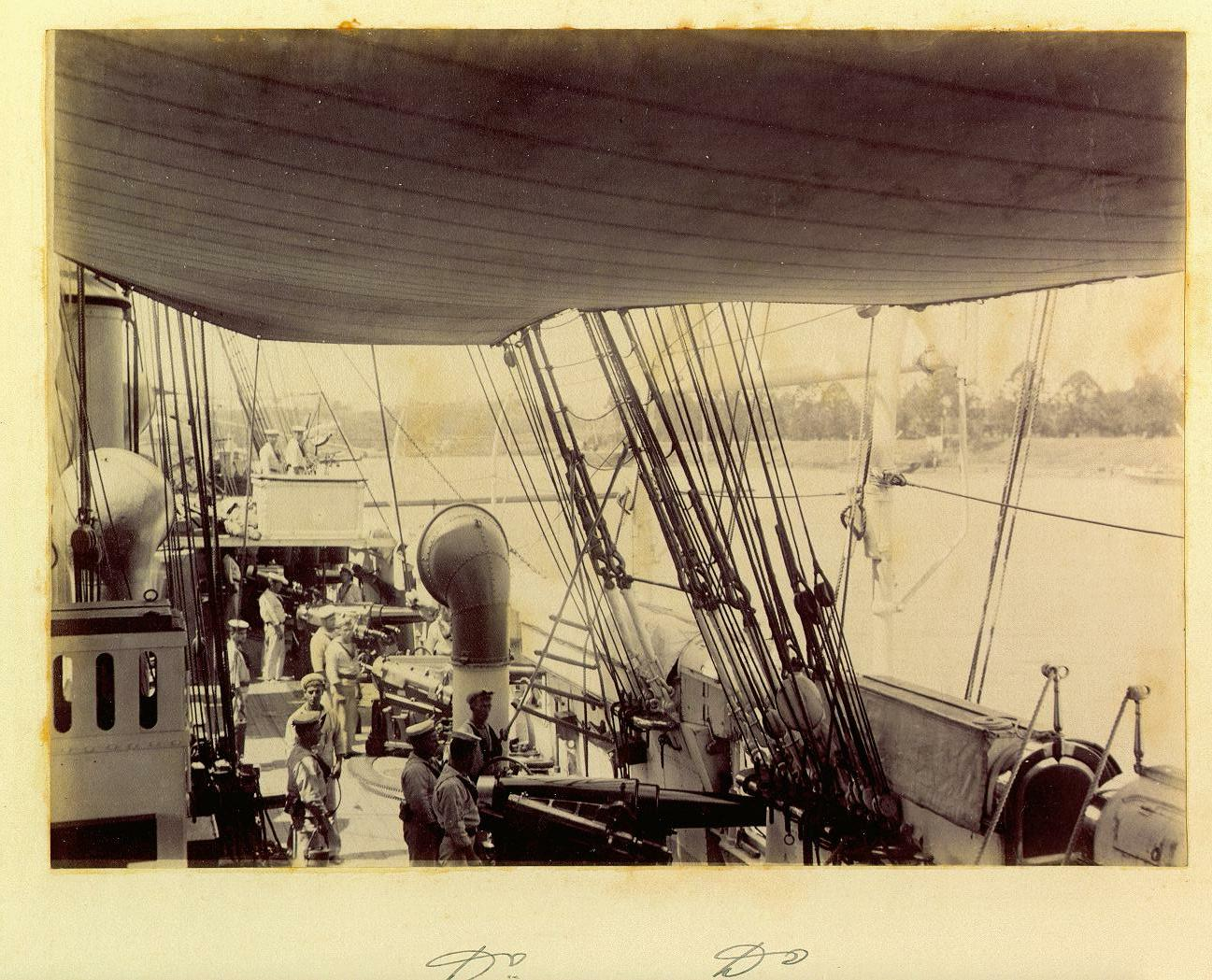
Crew on HMS Pylades at Brisbane in June 1896

Pylades is what is known as "composite" built. Soon after the building of ships with iron was commenced, this composite system of construction was adopted in the British merchant service, and some very fast and celebrated vessels were thus constructed. The iron framing, with wooden skin planking, admitted of considerable strength being obtained, and the possibility of sheathing the bottom with metal in order to avoid fouling, appeared to be another advantage in favor of the composite system. Soon, however, it was shown that the galvanic action set up between the copper on the "yellow metal" sheathing, and the iron frames tended to rapidly deteriorate the ironwork, and perhaps, sooner or later, hasten the loss of the vessel. So rapid, indeed, was this wasting of the frame found to be, that for some time past the composite system has been, so far as regards merchantmen, quite abandoned. Some ships, however, are still built "composite" for the Royal Navy, especially such craft as are intended for use on foreign stations, and whose duties would render frequent docking impossible. Such vessels are built with frames of steel, then sheathed with wood, and coppered.
