= Admiral Hornby (disambiguation) =

Geoffrey Hornby (1825–1895) was a British Royal Navy Admiral of the Fleet. Admiral Hornby may also refer to:

- Phipps Hornby (1785–1867), British Royal Navy admiral
- Robert Hornby (Royal Navy officer) (1866–1956), British Royal Navy admiral
