= Robert Hornby (Royal Navy officer) =

Royal Navy Admiral (1866–1956)

Admiral Robert Hornby CMG
- Born: 9 July 1866
- Died: 13 August 1956 (aged 90)
- Military career
- Allegiance: United Kingdom
- Branch: Royal Navy
- Service years: 1879–1922
- Rank: Admiral
- Commands: North America and West Indies Station; HMS Monarch; HMS Inflexible; HMS Vernon; HMS Glory; HMS Diana
- Conflicts: Anglo-Egyptian War; First World War
- Awards: Companion of the Order of St Michael and St George

Admiral Robert Stewart Phipps Hornby, CMG (9 July 1866 – 13 August 1956) was a Royal Navy officer who briefly served as Commander-in-Chief, North America and West Indies Station in 1915.

== Naval career ==
Born the son of Admiral of the Fleet Sir Geoffrey Hornby, Hornby joined the Royal Navy in 1879 and took part in the bombardment of Alexandria in July 1882 during the Anglo-Egyptian War. In September 1901, he was appointed in command of the corvette HMS Pylades, serving on the Australia Station. The following year she was with HMS Royal Arthur (flagship) and HMS Mildura when she visited Norfolk Island in July, and Suva, Fiji in August, then paid a visit to Gilbert Islands on her own. He was promoted to captain on 1 January 1903.

Hornby became involved in resolving the Sinai boundary dispute in 1906 and served in the First World War, initially commanding Light Cruiser Squadrons. In August 1914 he commanded the 11th Cruiser Squadron and then became Commander-in-Chief, North America and West Indies Station in February 1915 before reverting to second in command of that station in March 1915. He retired in 1922.

Military offices
Preceded by Vacant (last held by Sir Day Bosanquet)	Commander-in-Chief, North America and West Indies Station; February–March 1915	Succeeded by Sir George Patey
