= Point Pleasant Park =

Park in Halifax, Nova Scotia

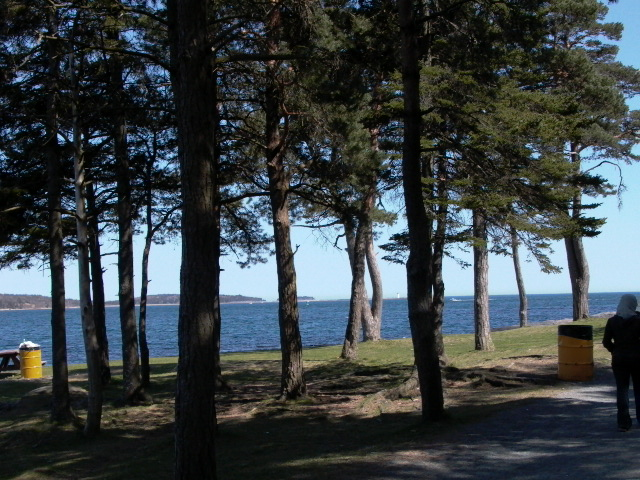
- Point Pleasant Park
- Interactive map of Point Pleasant Park
- Type: Public park
- Location: Halifax, Nova Scotia
- Coordinates: 44°37′22″N 63°34′9″W
- Area: 75 ha (190 acres)
- Created: 1866
- Operator: Halifax Regional Municipality (Land under lease from Government of Canada)

Point Pleasant Park is a large, mainly forested municipal park at the southern tip of the Halifax peninsula. It once hosted several artillery batteries, and still contains the Prince of Wales Tower - the oldest Martello tower in North America (1796). The park is a popular recreational spot for Haligonians, as it hosts forest walks and affords views across the harbour and out toward the Atlantic.

Plays are performed in the park every summer by a professional theatre company called Shakespeare by the Sea. The performances take place at Cambridge Battery, and include both Shakespearean productions and original musicals based on classic fairy tales for audiences of all ages. The company also operates the 80-seat Park Place Theatre in the lower parking lot of the park, which is used as a rain venue during the summer, and for fall/winter indoor productions.

Point Pleasant Park originally was owned by the British government and was leased to the City of Halifax for a ceremonial 1 shilling per year. The original lease for the land was negotiated by Sir William Young in 1866. The park is now owned by the Government of Canada and is leased to the Halifax Regional Municipality. The lease for the park is administered on behalf of the Government of Canada by the Parks Canada Agency.

== History ==
=== 18th-19th century ===
==== St. Aspinquid Chapel ====
St. Aspinquid's Chapel was established by a French missionary, Louis-Pierre Thury, at Chebucto (present day Halifax, Nova Scotia) in the late 17th century. The chapel is a natural stone amphitheatre located by Chain Rock Battery on the Northwest Arm at Point Pleasant Park. There are numerous notable people who were interred in the burial grounds around the chapel. The chapel was also the location of the Mi’kmaq celebration the Feast of St. Aspinquid (St. Aspinquid's Day), which was conducted through much of the 18th century. The Chapel is also the site of a battle during the French and Indian War between two Mi'kmaq chiefs (1760).

==== Establishing Halifax ====
In 1749, Edward Cornwallis arrived under instruction of the British Government to create a sizeable military and civilian settlement of 4000 in Halifax which sparked Father Le Loutre's War. He first settled Point Pleasant Park but then, being too exposed to the elements, moved the settlement below Citadel Hill. Halifax was to become a strategic settlement for the British and fortifications were primarily intended to prevent enemy ships from getting into the Halifax Harbour. Fortifications began to be constructed at present-day Point Pleasant Park toward the end of the French and Indian War.

There were a total of seven fortifications constructed: Chain Rock, Chain Battery, Point Pleasant Battery, Northwest Arm Battery, Fort Ogilvie, Prince of Wales Tower and Cambridge Battery. Most were rebuilt or modified four or five times over the subsequent 200 years.

==== French and Indian War ====
There were four defences that were constructed during the French and Indian War: Chain Battery, Chain Rock, Point Pleasant Battery and Northwest Arm Battery. The defences were built of logs, earth, and stone. They were built with wood-burning fireplaces, and furnaces were later added for smelting cannon shot. Chain Battery and Chain Rock were basic fortifications built on the natural terrain to protect the Northwest Arm. Unlike most of the other fortifications, the battery here was not rebuilt in the 19th century, so it retains its original 1762 layout. Because it was abandoned so early, the area has been reforested for most of the historic period. Point Pleasant Battery is one of the oldest fortification batteries. Though Point Pleasant Battery was first constructed in 1762, what is visible today dates mostly from the early 20th century. The fourth battery - the Northwest Arm Battery - was built during the war, just west of Point Pleasant, was damaged in 1895 and was falling into the sea. It was moved further along the Northwest Arm shore. Northwest Arm Battery was first built in 1762 and disused after the 1860s. Archeological remains associated with its barracks include a summer house built for the Park in the 1880s. The battery here retains its early 19th century configuration.

==== French Revolutionary Wars ====
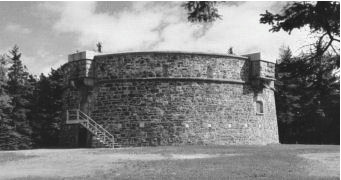
Prince of Wales Tower - oldest Martello Tower in North America (1796), Point Pleasant Park Halifax Nova Scotia

In 1792, during the French Revolutionary Wars, the threat of an immediate French attack alerted the British military in Halifax to the possibility of a landing in the harbour and batteries were upgraded and improved. Fort Ogilvie was built at this time and is located in the eastern part of Point Pleasant Park. It was built by the order of General Ogilvie, then commander of the Halifax garrison. Ogilvie named the battery after himself.

In 1796-97, a battery was built on high ground behind the point at a location capable of defending the point batteries. A few years later, the battery was converted to a large round stone tower known as the Prince of Wales Tower, similar to the Martello Towers built in large numbers elsewhere by the British military. The Prince of Wales Tower is 26 feet high and is 72 feet in diameter. The exposed material is ironstone rubble masonry, with 8-foot-thick (2.4 m) walls. The original construction permitted six mounted guns on the roof and four guns on the second storey.

Further modifications were made over the next seventy years. By 1813, the Tower mounted four 6-pound guns on garrison carriages on its barrack level, two 24-pound guns on traversing platforms and six 24-pound carronades on traversing slides on top. After 1864, the Tower was used as a self-defensible depot magazine.

The park was the site of several small farms during the early settlement of Halifax. A rock outcropping at Black Rock Beach was used to gibbet the bodies of executed criminal such as the pirate Edward Jordan in 1809.

Cambridge Battery is situated back from the Point Pleasant and Northwest Arm batteries along the shore. It was approved in 1862 and completed in 1868. The battery was named in honour of the Duke of Cambridge, who was the head of the military during much of Queen Victoria's reign.

=== 20th century ===
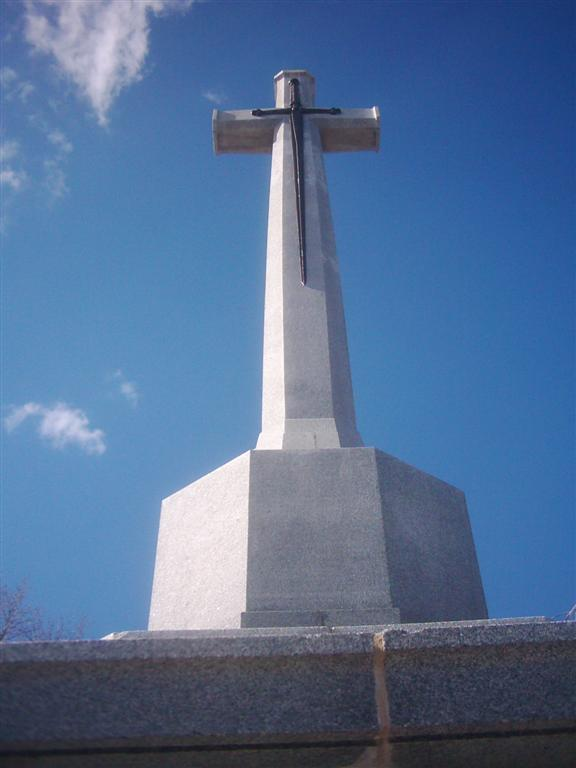
Cross of Sacrifice on The Halifax Memorial, which commemorates Canadian servicemen and women who died at sea during both World Wars. It includes the Royal Canadian Navy, Canadian Merchant Navy, and Canadian Army

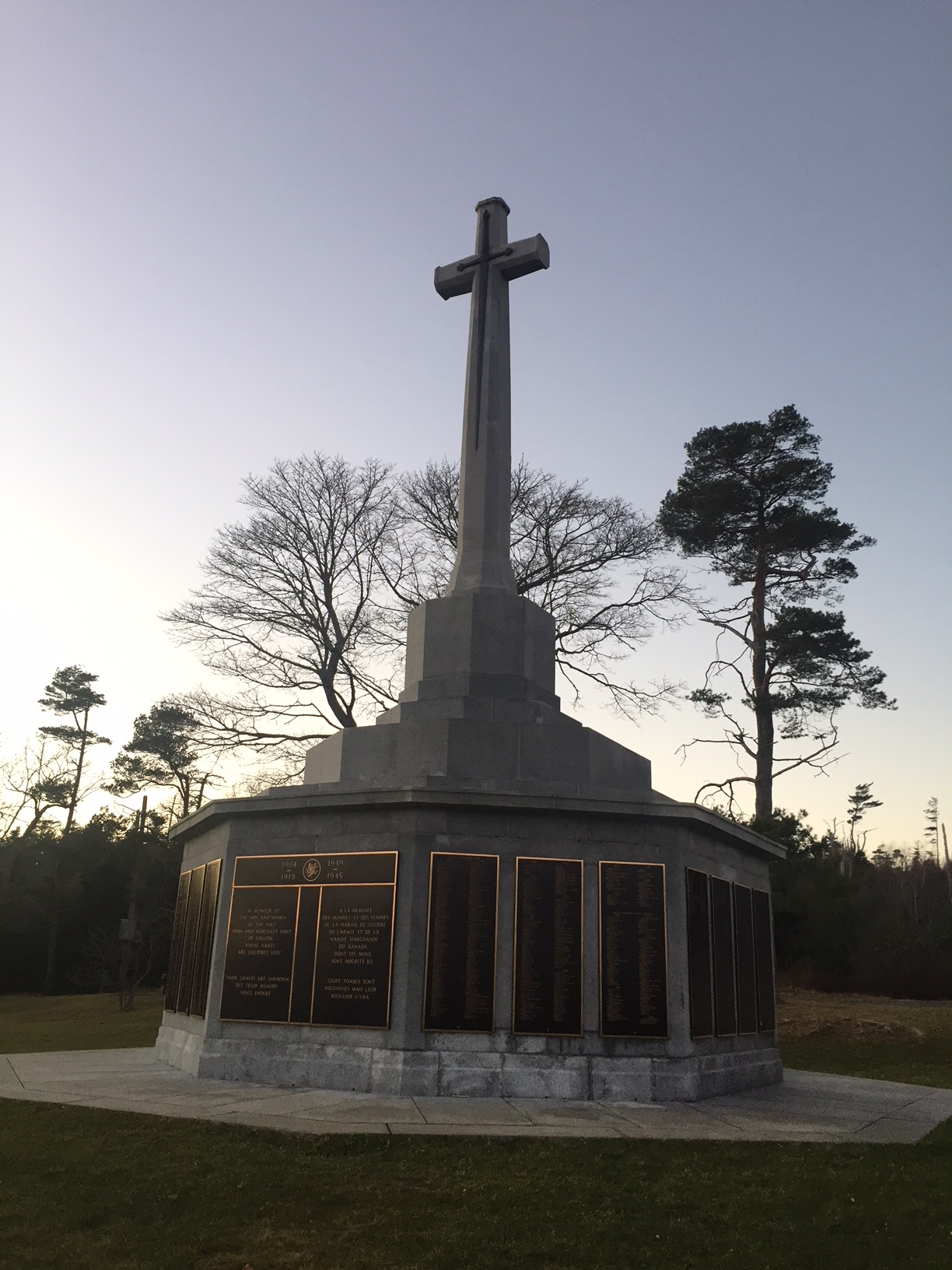
Halifax Memorial

The Cambridge Battery was abandoned by the time of the First World War.

In 1929, the military temporarily vacated the park before returning in 1938 during the Second World War. Although the Martello tower ceased to be important for military purposes in the late 19th century, some of the other fortifications in the Park continued to be used by the military until the close of the Second World War. Fort Ogilvie and Cambridge Battery were upgraded with modern weapons during the Second World War. A gun from this era is still visible at Fort Ogilvie.

Small amounts of stone were quarried in the park in the 19th century, the small quarries today forming a pond near the park entrance. In the 1920s, the Halifax streetcar line was extended into the park as far as the Prince of Wales Tower but the route was abandoned in the 1940s.

The park was the target of a "group" calling itself "Loki 7" in 1994, when they planted a pipe bomb in a garbage bin. Nobody was injured.

In 1943 a Canadian steamship, SS Point Pleasant Park, was named after the park. The mayor of Halifax presented the ship's captain with a framed picture of the Yonge Street gate which was displayed in the dining room aboard the ship until it was torpedoed in 1945.

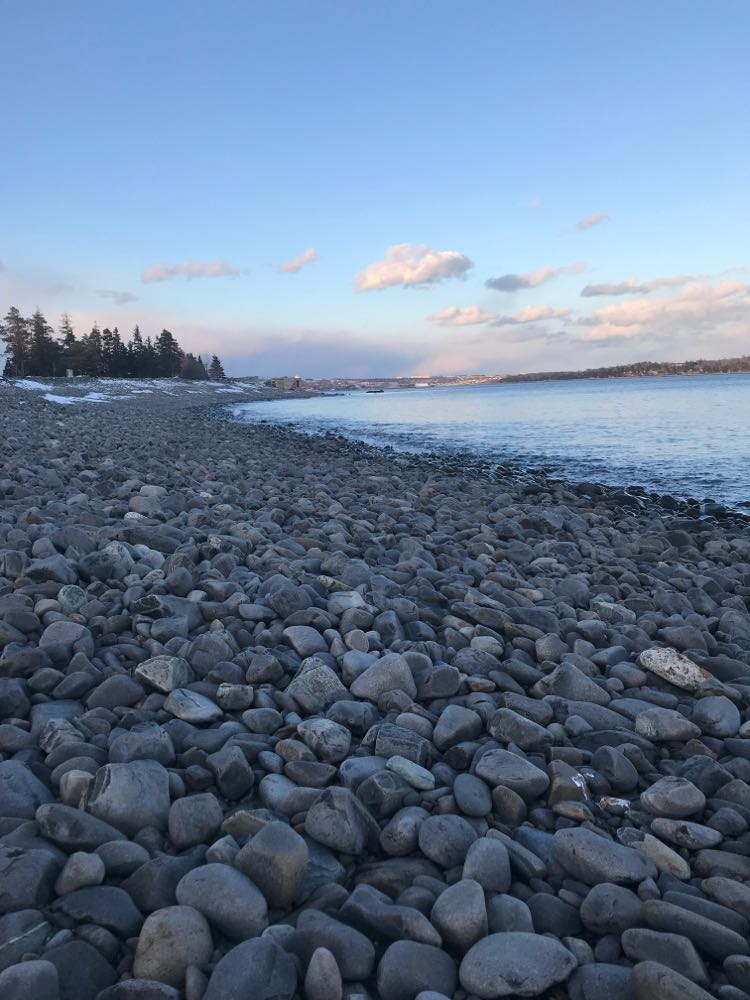
Point Pleasant Park in winter

In 2000 the Canadian Food Inspection Agency planned to cut 10,000 trees to halt an outbreak of brown spruce longhorn beetles (Tetropium fuscum). This plan was challenged by the Friends of Pt. Pleasant Park in the courts, which resulted in a temporary injunction stopping the cutting. The injunction was later removed but there was a reduction in tree cutting to less than 2000.

=== 21st century ===
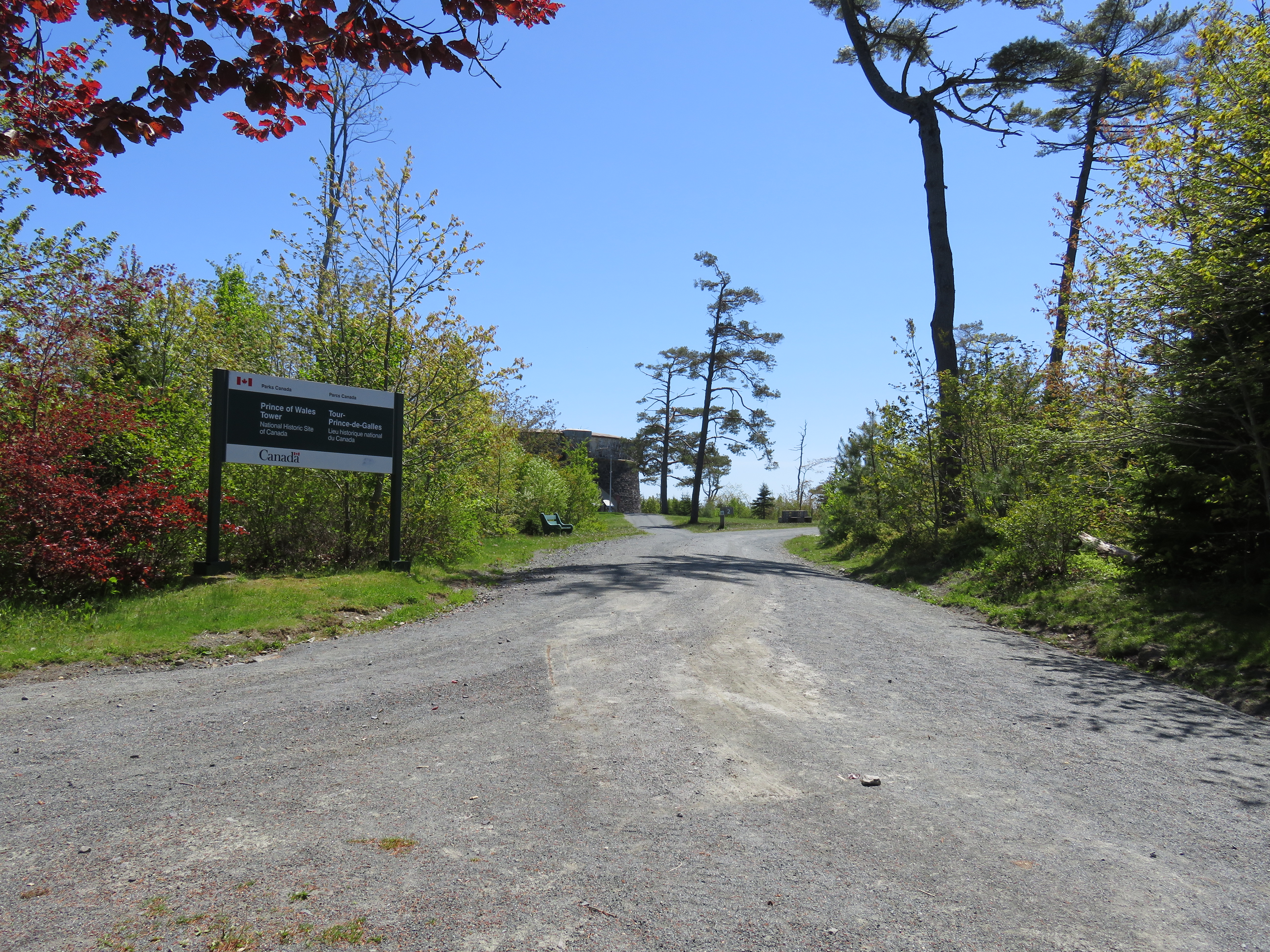
Entrance to Prince of Wales Tower, June 2016, showing only partial reforestation. Prior to Hurricane Juan in 2003 it was covered by a dense canopy of trees - see identical image before hurricane and also the same view after the hurricane

In September 2003, Point Pleasant Park was devastated by Hurricane Juan. Nearly three quarters of the park's trees were knocked down and the park remained closed until June 2004. While there were still trees remaining, the park now had a very thin canopy.

Assistance from the Canadian federal government allowed Halifax Regional Municipality to make significant progress in the recovery and renewal of the park. As of June 2008 over 70,000 Acadian forest trees had been planted in the park, surpassing the number of trees lost to Hurricane Juan.

The comprehensive plan for Point Pleasant Park proposed long-term care for the park's forest based on Canada's national standard for sustainable forest management. The process of Adaptive Management would be used to guide the renewal and care of Point Pleasant, one of Canada's oldest urban parks.

== Military monuments ==
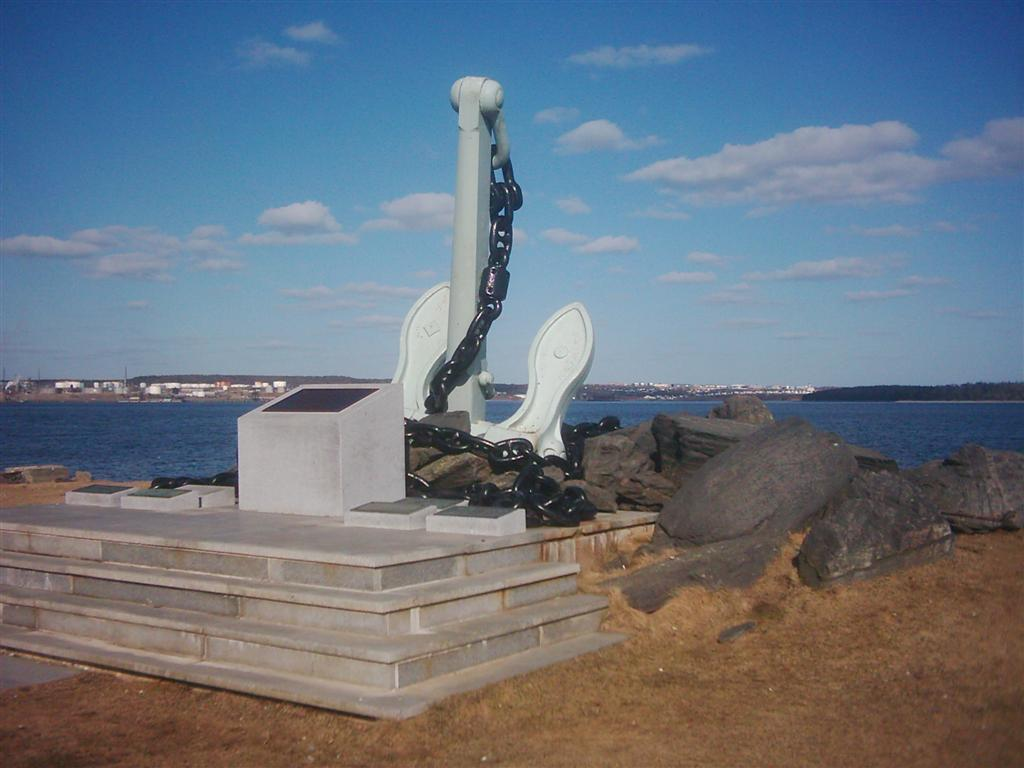
HMCS Bonaventure's anchor monument

Point Pleasant is the location to numerous monuments associated with the heritage of Halifax and the sea. The largest is the Halifax Monument, better known as the Sailor's Memorial, which commemorates members of the Royal Canadian Navy, the Canadian Merchant Navy and Canadian Army who were lost at sea. It was first erected in 1924 in a headland near the park but moved to Citadel Hill in 1954 when names from World War II were added. However the cross on Citadel Hill had decayed by 1966 so it was replaced in 1967 by the present monument in Point Pleasant. The current memorial consists of a Cross of Sacrifice inscribed with the names of 3257 Canadian men and women who were buried at sea as a result of the World Wars. The most well-known casualties listed on the monument are the nursing sisters who died on the HMHS Llandovery Castle during World War 1. (415 Canadians from naval and merchant ships who died in the Atlantic Ocean during World War I.) The original monument has been replaced by two later monuments.

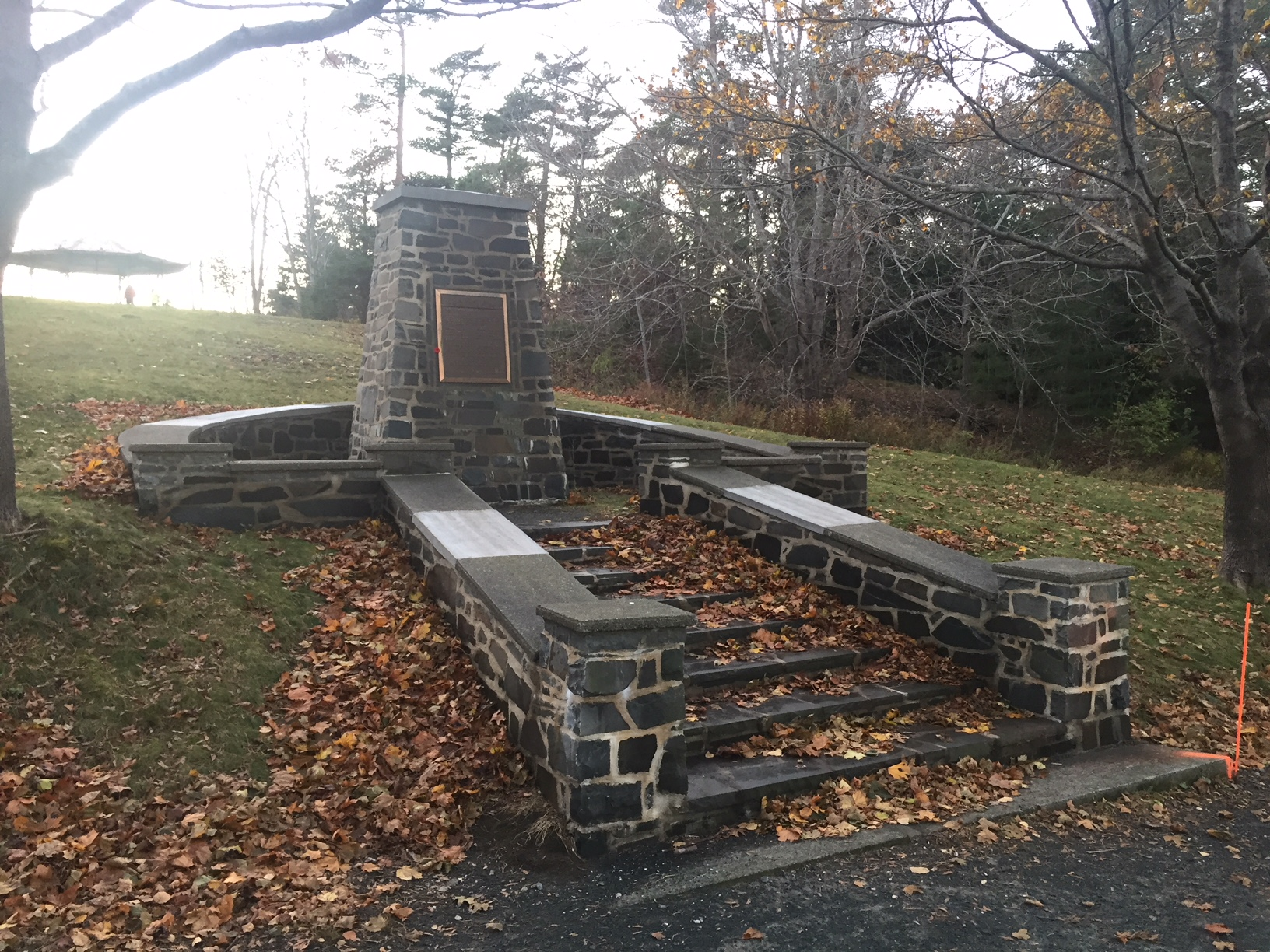
SS Point Pleasant Park Monument, Point Pleasant Park, Halifax, Nova Scotia, Canada

The ship's anchor from the aircraft carrier HMCS Bonaventure is a monument to the men and women who died while serving the Canadian Navy during Peacetime. A cairn marks the men killed in the sinking of the Canadian Merchant Navy ship Point Pleasant Park in 1945. A monument facing the Northwest Arm honour Walter Hose, a naval commander who helped build the Royal Canadian Navy while another honours the families who ran the Northwest Arm ferry and performed many rescues. National Historic Site plaques in the park commemorate the role of Halifax as Naval Port and the Battle between HMS Shannon and USS Chesapeake in 1813.

== Flora ==
Trees include:

- Acer saccharum - Sugar maple
- Acer rubrum - Red maple
- Abies balsamea - balsam fir
- Betula papyrifera - White birch
- Malus domestica - Apple
- Picea rubens - Red spruce
- Pinus resinosa - Red pine
- Pinus strobus - White pine
- Prunus pensylvanica - Pin Cherry
- Quercus rubra - Red oak
- Sorbus americana - Mountain ash
- Tsuga canadensis - Hemlock tree

Shrubs include:

- Amelanchier canadensis - Shadbush
- Aralia hispida - Bristly sarsaparilla
- Aralia nudicaulis - Wild sarsaparilla
- Comptonia peregrina - Sweet-fern
- Cornus canadensis - Bunchberry
- Diervilla lonicera - Northern Bush Honeysuckle
- Epigaea repens - Mayflower
- Ilex mucronata - Mountain holly, formerly Nemopanthus
- Kalmia angustifolia - Sheep laurel
- Mitchella repens Two-eyed berry
- Prunus pensylvanica Pin Cherry
- Rubus - Berries
- Vaccinium angustifolium - Blueberry
- Vaccinium vitis-idaea - Partridgeberry
- Viburnum cassinoides - Witherod
- Viburnum nudum - Northern Wild Raisin

Ferns and mosses include:

- Lycopodium - Club mosses
- Equisetum arvense - horsetail
- Pteridium aquilinum - Bracken fern

Wildflowers include:

- Aster - Michaelmas daisies
- Barbarea vulgaris - wintercress
- Clintonia borealis - yellow clintonia
- Coptis groenlandica - Goldthread
- Gaultheria procumbens - Wintergreen
- Houstonia caerulea - Bluets
- Maianthemum canadense - Wild lily of the valley
- Potentilla simplex - Common cinquefoil
- Sisyrinchium montanum - blue-eyed grass
- Solidago - Goldenrod
- Trientalis borealis - Starflower
- Tussilago farfara - Coltsfoot
- Viola cucullata - Marsh blue violet
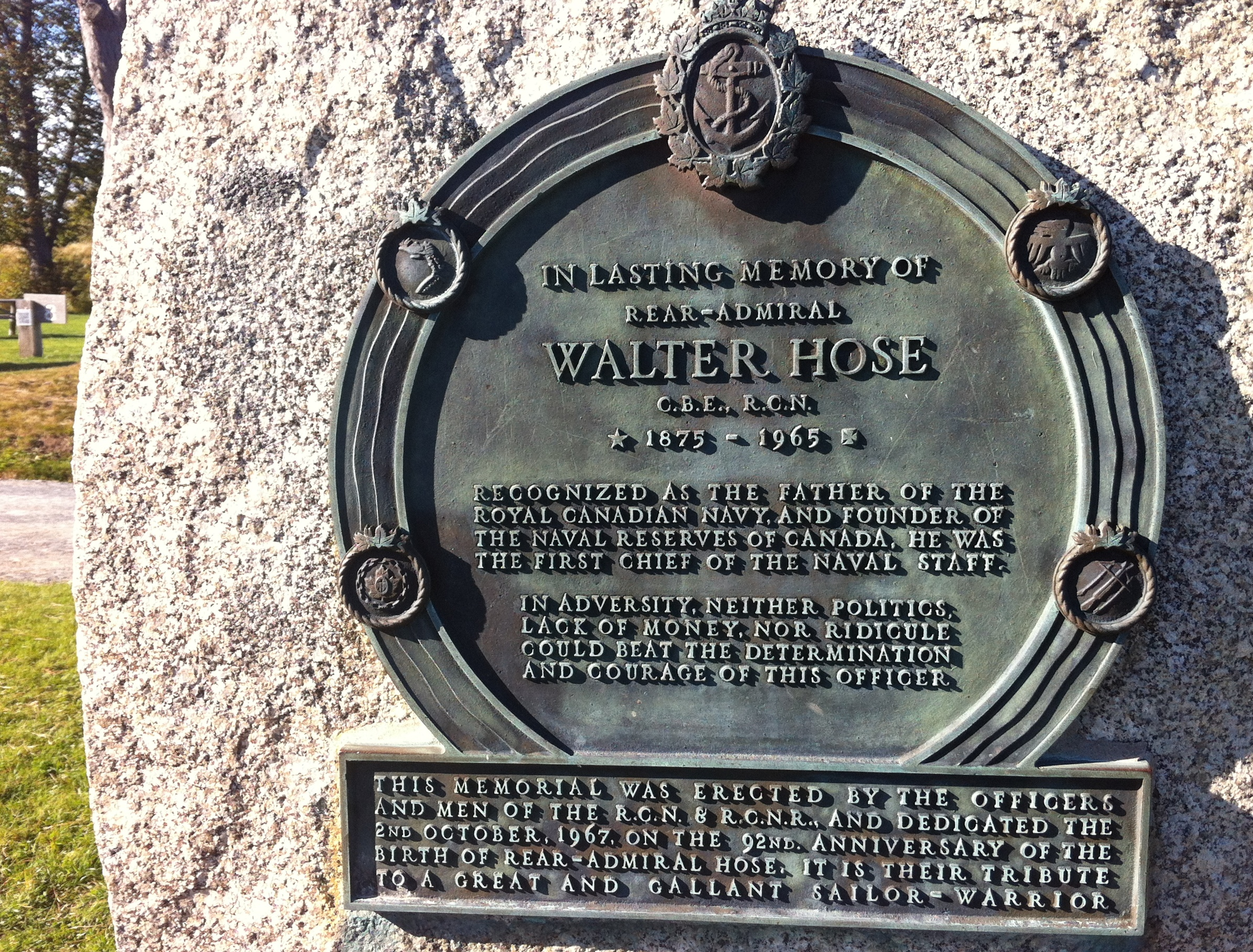
Walter Hose Monument

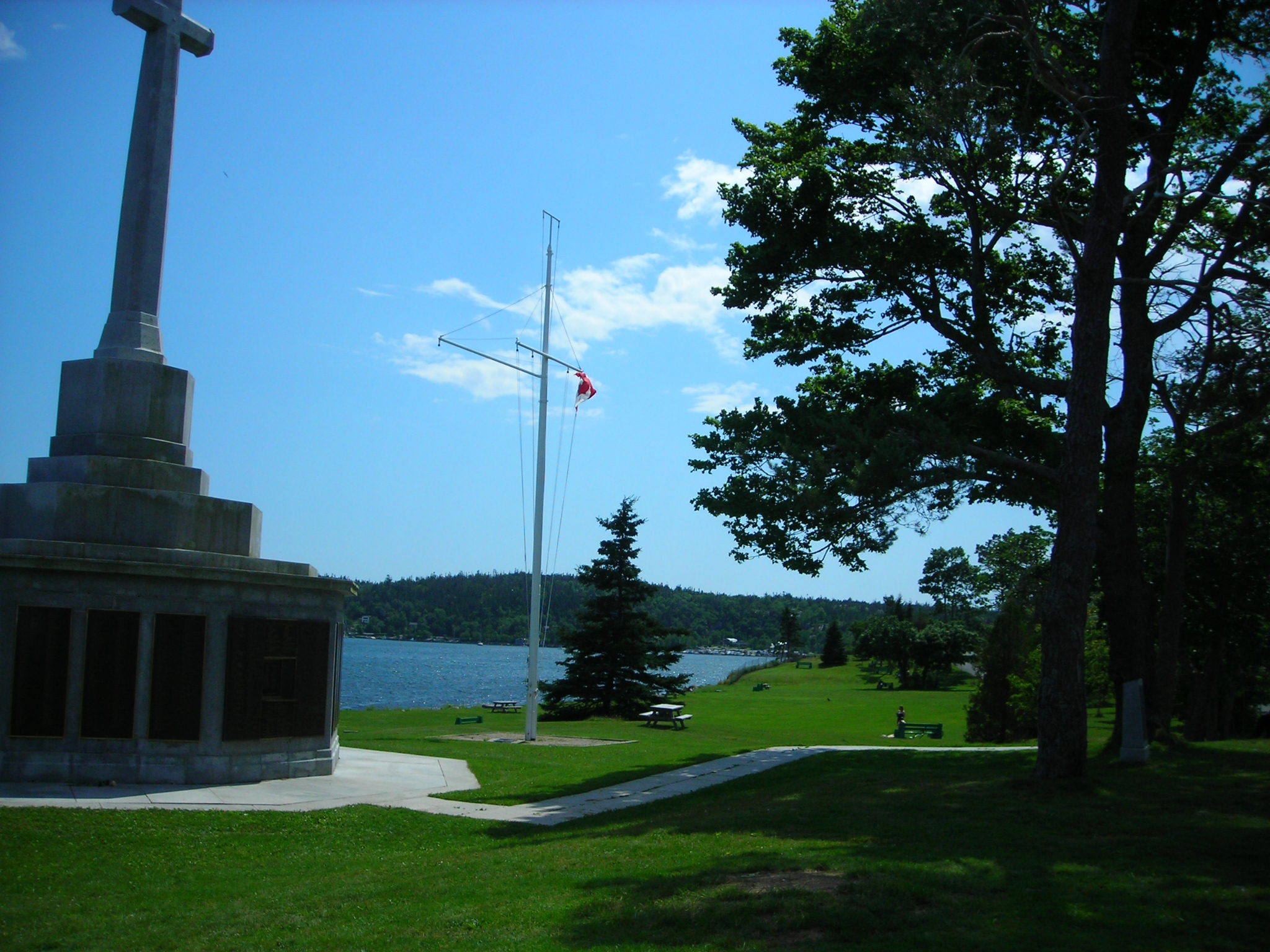
Point Pleasant Park South Side

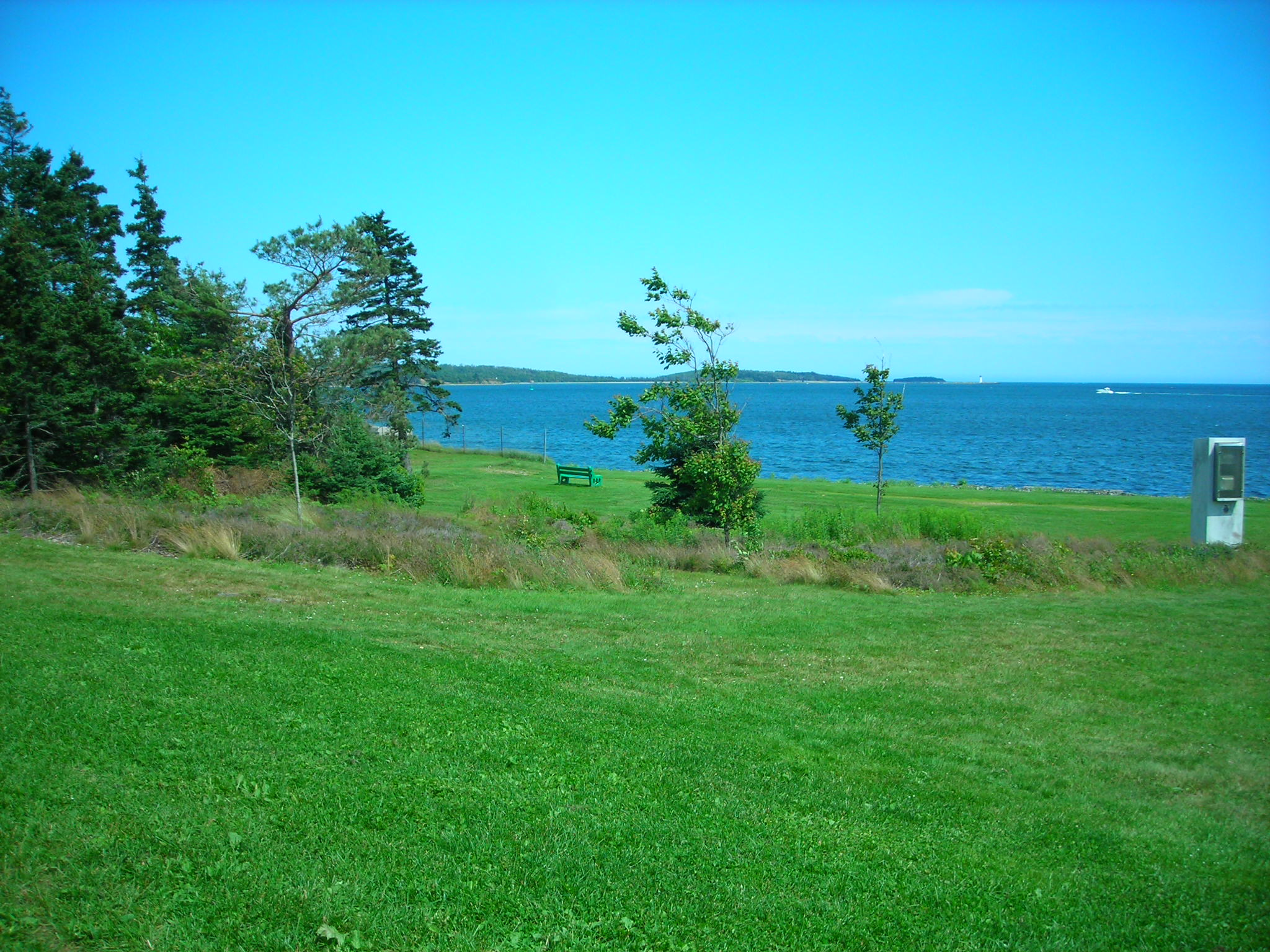
Point Pleasant Park South Side View to McNabs Island

Map of park at main entrance, July 2005

== Transportation ==
Point Pleasant Park is served by Halifax Transit's route "29 Barrington", which terminates at a turning loop at the Tower Road entrance of the park.

== See also ==
- Military history of Nova Scotia

== Bibliography ==
- Kitz, Janet, and Gary Castle, Point Pleasant Park: An Illustrated History, 1999, Pleasant Point Publishing, Halifax.
- Directors of Point Pleasant Park, Point Pleasant Park brochure, undated.
- Don Awalt.The Mi’kmaq and Point Pleasant Park. 2004
- "Point Pleasant Park". Halifax Regional Municipality. 2011. Archived from the original on 13 March 2016.
- Robertson, Stephanie. "Point Pleasant Park: A History". Friends of Point Pleasant Park.
- How Halifax sealed deal to rent Point Pleasant Park for shilling a year. 'Shilling ceremony' taking place to celebrate the historic park lease that's in effect until 2865Katy Parsons, May 28 2017. CBC

=== Flora ===
- Schmidt, Allison; Beauchamp, Christine (2011). "Forest Ecology: Point Pleasant Park Field Project". Tested Studies for Laboratory Teaching; Proceedings of the Association for Biology Laboratory Education. 32: 127–134.
- "Wild Flora and Habitat in Nova Scotia". Nova Scotia Wild Flora Society. 2016. Archived from the original on 2016-04-28.
- "Trees of the Acadian Forest" (PDF). Department of Natural Resources, Government of Nova Scotia. 2012.
- Tate, Brenda Levy (2011). "Nova Scotia Nature".
- Landry, Peter (2011). "Wild Flowers of Nova Scotia".
- LaPaix, Rich; Patriquin, David (11 May 2012). "Provisional List of Vascular Plant Species in Point Pleasant Park, Nova Scotia" (PDF).
- "Atlantic Canada Conservation Data Centre". 2016.
- Nehring, William A.; Olmstead, Nancy C. (1979). The Audubon Society field guide to North American wildflowers: Eastern Region. New York: Knopf. ISBN 0-394-50432-1.
- Pam Berman. New invasive rose at Point Pleasant Park on the rise: Community council asks Halifax staff for strategy to remove multiflora rose. CBC Nova Scotia 1 July 2016
- Invasive Species. Halifax Regional Municipality 2016

=== Images ===
- "Entrance to Prince of Wales Tower before Hurricane Juan". Saint Mary's University (Halifax), School of the Environment (Photograph).
- "Entrance to Prince of Wales Tower after Hurricane Juan". Saint Mary's University (Halifax), School of the Environment (Photograph).
