= Diana Kingsmill Wright =

Canadian athlete, journalist and activist

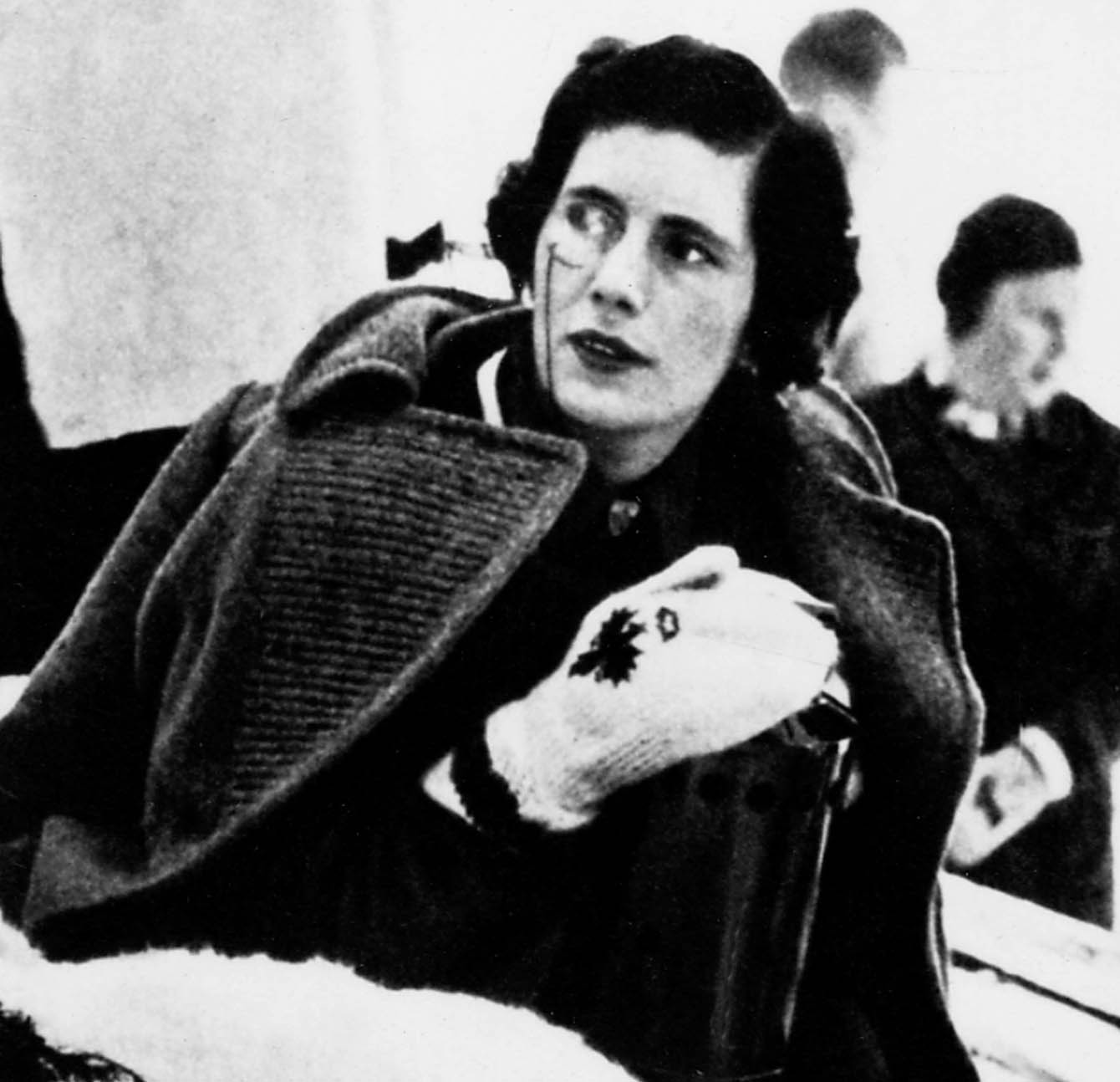
- Born: Diana Kingsmill; 24 December 1908; Ottawa, Ontario
- Died: 24 January 1982 (aged 73)
- Occupations: athlete, journalist, environmentalist
- Spouse(s): Victor Gordon-Lennox (1932–1940); J. F. C. Wright (1944–1970)
- Writing career
- Period: 1920s-1970s

Diana Kingsmill Wright (24 December 1908 – 24 January 1982) was a Canadian athlete, journalist and activist.

== Biography ==
Diana Kingsmill Wright was born in Ottawa, Ontario, on 24 December 1908. She was the daughter of Naval Service of Canada admiral Sir Charles Kingsmill, She was raised and educated in Canada and England.

In her youth, she was a competitive figure skater, who was a winner of the Devonshire Cup. She was later a member of the Canadian alpine skiing team at the 1936 Winter Olympics, and competed despite having suffered a broken hand.

She married Victor Gordon-Lennox, the son of British politician Lord Walter Gordon-Lennox, in 1932. In this era she was a friend of actor David Niven, who wrote about her in his autobiography The Moon Is a Balloon.

She returned to Ottawa in 1940 after separating from Gordon-Lennox. She remarried historian J. F. C. Wright in 1944, in the Parliament Hill office of J. S. Woodsworth, and moved with Wright to Saskatoon, Saskatchewan. Active in the Saskatchewan chapter of the Cooperative Commonwealth Federation, the Wrights became co-editors of Union Farmer, the newspaper of the Saskatchewan Farmers' Union, in 1950. Wright died by suicide in 1970.

In the 1960s, she was active in Voice of Women. She leased the Kingsmill family summer home on Grindstone Island to the Society of Friends to serve as a Quaker retreat centre and an institution for peace studies. She later served as editor of Environment Probe, and served on an advisory committee to the Canadian Broadcasting Corporation on its coverage of agriculture and farming issues.
