= Prince of Wales Tower =

Martello tower in Nova Scotia, Canada

Coordinates: 44°37′18″N 63°34′11″W

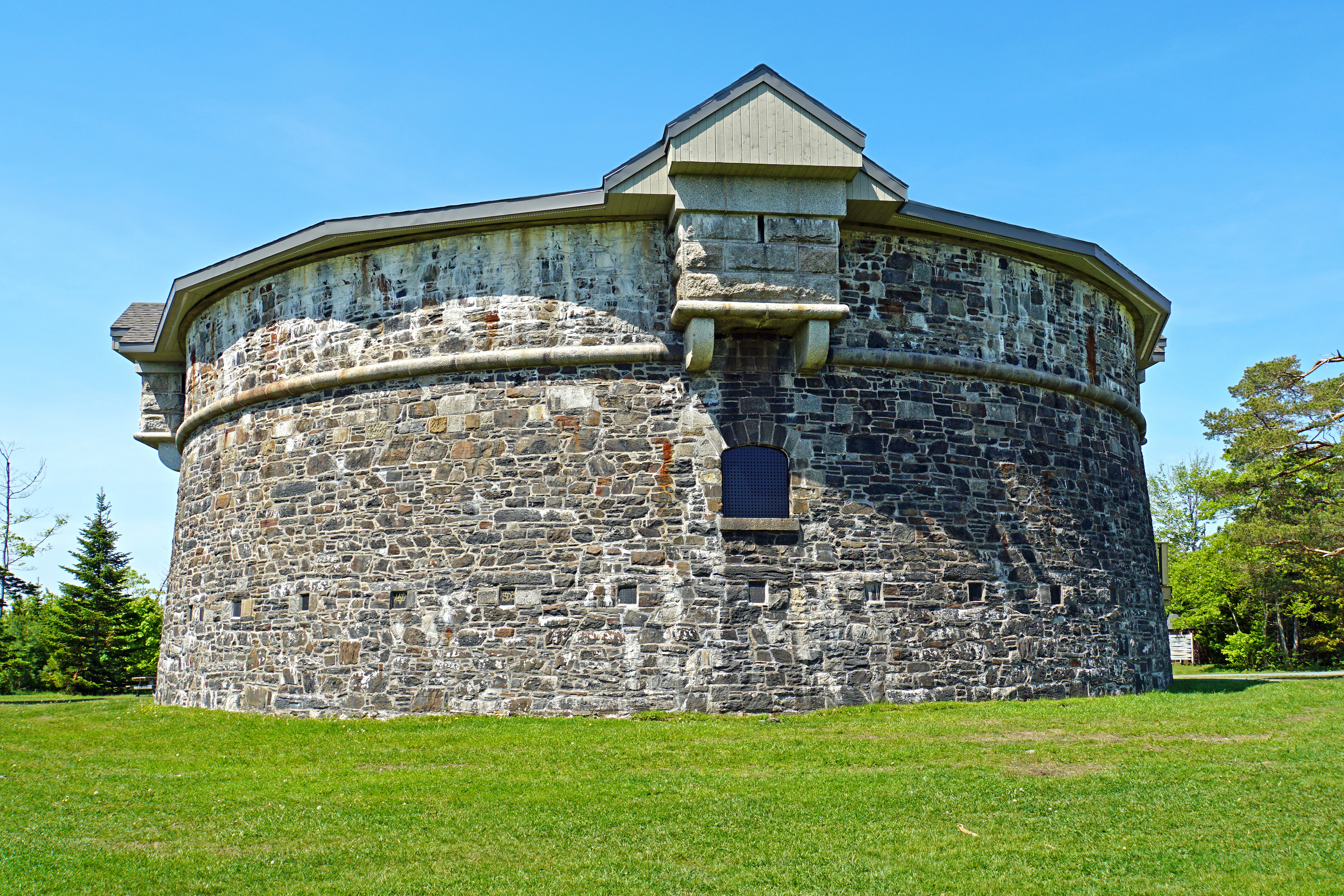
Oldest Martello Tower in North America

Location map of the Prince of Wales Tower

The Prince of Wales Tower is the oldest martello tower in North America and is located in Point Pleasant Park, Halifax Regional Municipality, Nova Scotia, Canada. It was built in 1796 by Captain James Straton and was used as a redoubt and a powder magazine. Restored, it was designated a National Historic Site of Canada in 1943.

== History ==
In 1796-97, Edward, Duke of Kent had a battery built to defend the point batteries. A few years later, the battery was converted to a large round stone tower known as the Prince of Wales Tower, similar to the Martello Towers built in large numbers elsewhere by the British military. The Prince of Wales Tower is named after Edward's eldest brother, the future George IV of the United Kingdom.

There were five Martello Towers built in Halifax, the Prince of Wales Tower being the last remaining Tower.

== Structure ==
The Prince of Wales Tower is 26 feet (7.9 m) high and is 72 feet (22 m) in diameter. The exposed material is ironstone rubble masonry, with 8-foot-thick (2.4 m) walls. The tower is a squat, round structure built of stone, almost three times as wide as it is high. The original construction allowed for six mounted guns on the roof and four guns on the second storey. The second storey was intended for barrack use and the ground floor for storage. The tower could accommodate 200 soldiers.

Further modifications were made over the next seventy years. By 1813, the Tower mounted four 6-pound guns on garrison carriages on its barrack level, two 24-pound guns on traversing platforms and six 24-pound cannonades on traversing slides on top. After 1864, the Tower was used as a self-defensible depot magazine. The roof was replaced in 2016.

== Gallery ==
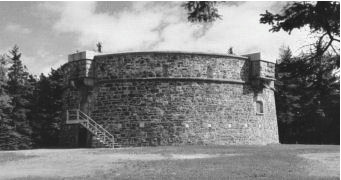
Prince of Wales Tower

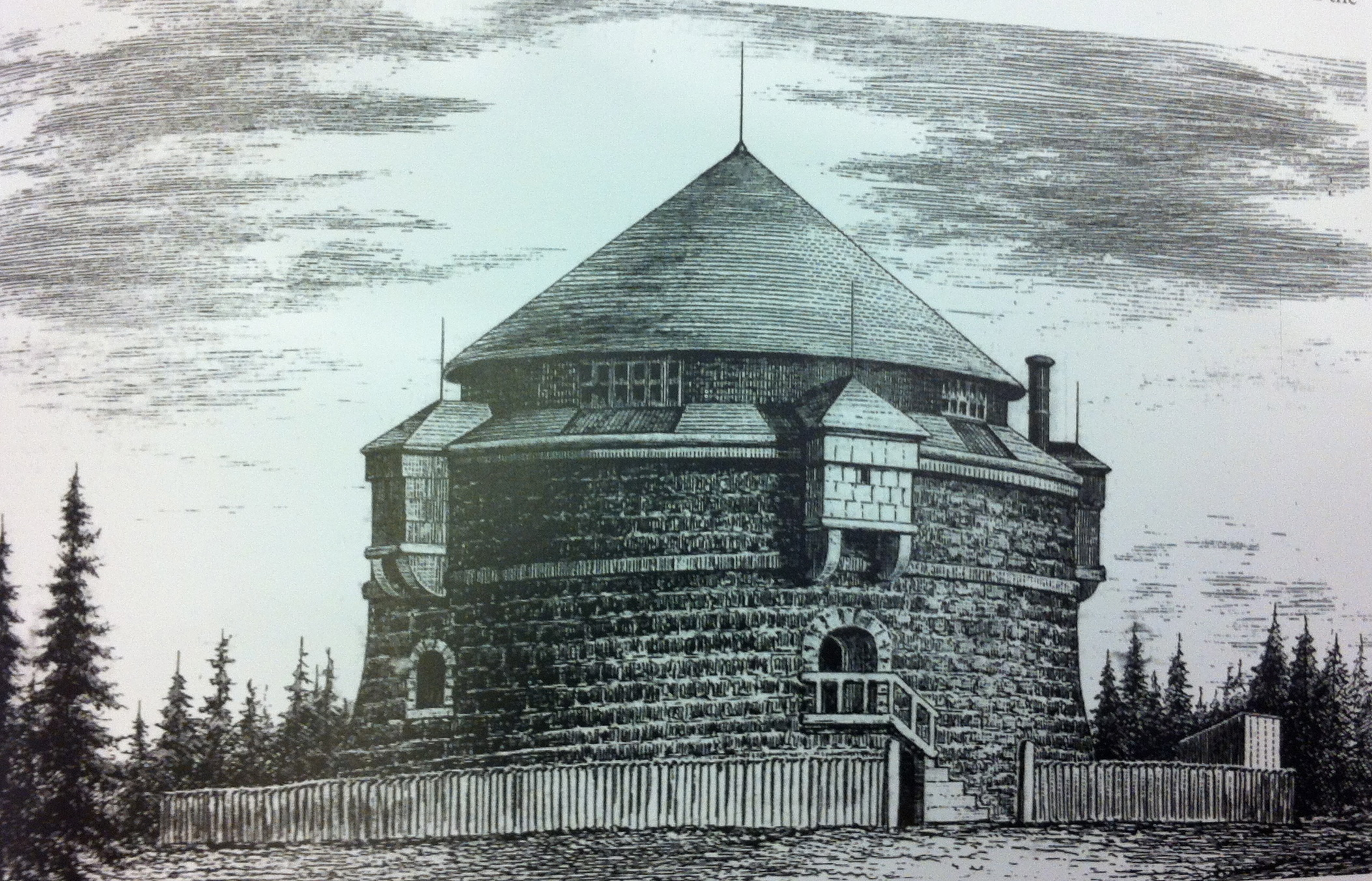
The Tower c. 1800

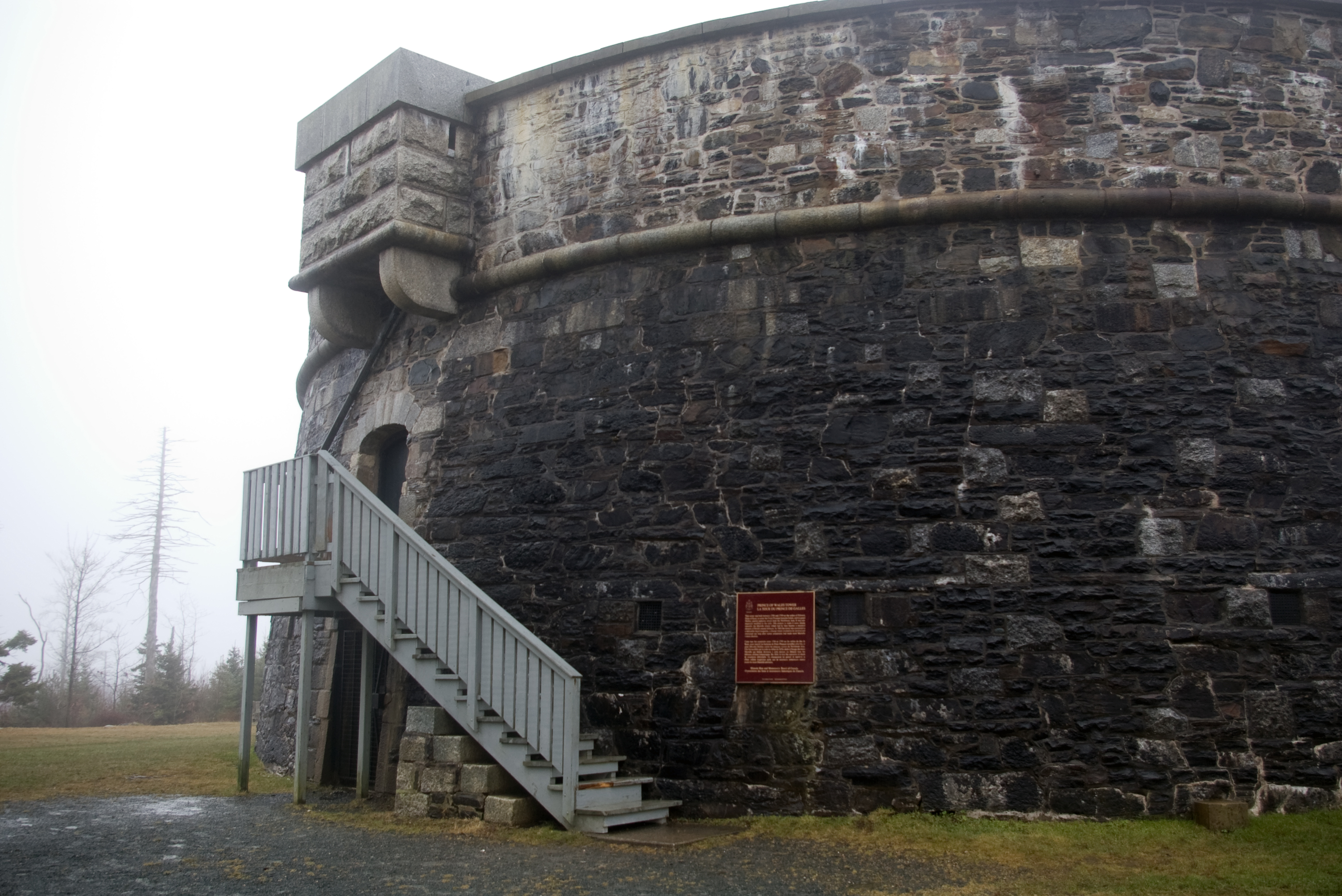
Staircase to the Tower

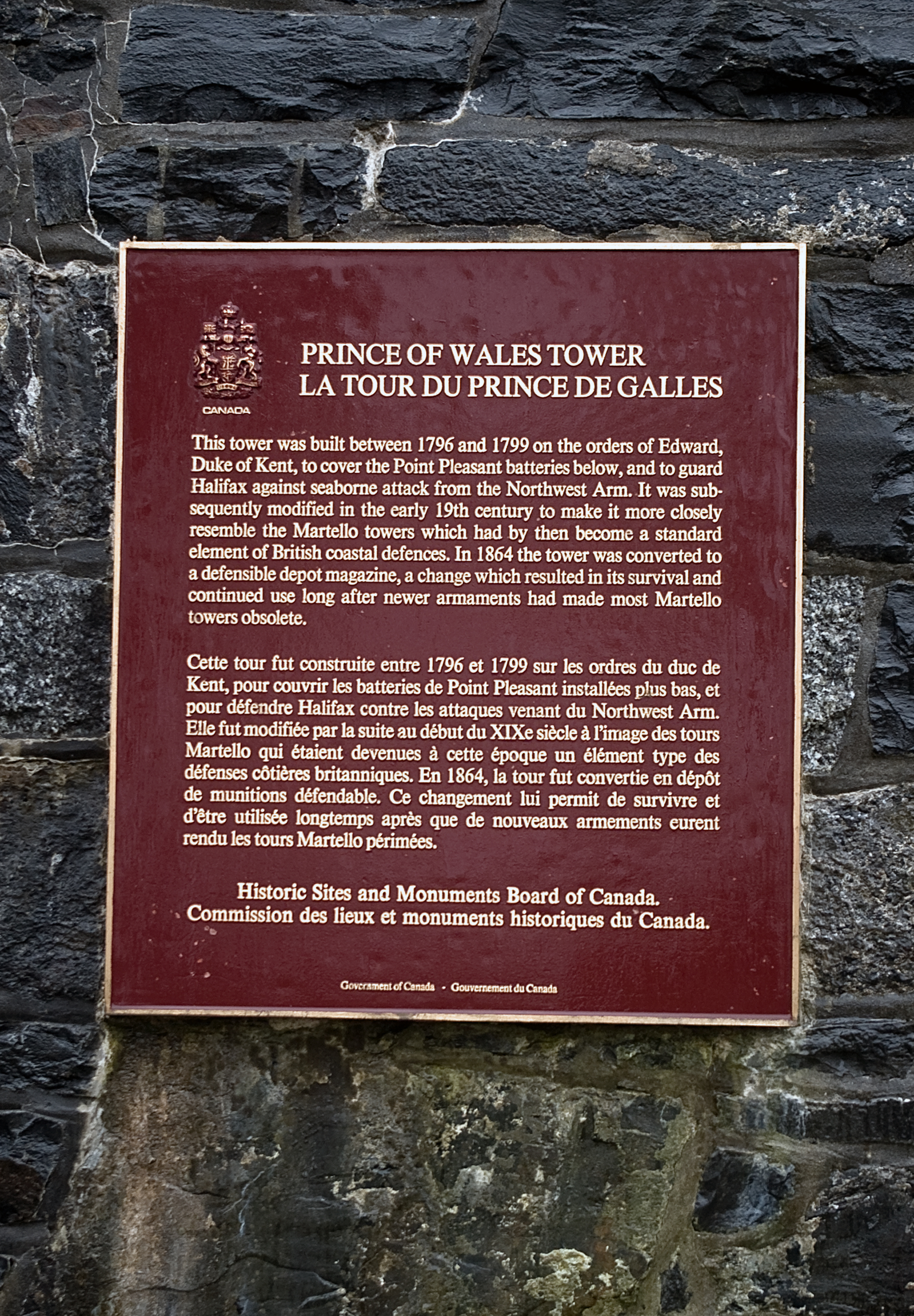
Plaque

== Legacy ==
- namesake of Tower Road, Halifax, Nova Scotia

== See also ==
- Military history of Nova Scotia
- List of oldest buildings and structures in Halifax, Nova Scotia
- History of the Halifax Regional Municipality
- Royal eponyms in Canada

== Bibliography ==
- Prince of Wales Tower - National Historic Site Archived February 10, 2013, at the Wayback Machine
- Clements, W.H. (1999). Towers of strength: the story of the Martello towers. Barnsley, South Yorkshire: Leo Cooper. ISBN 9780850526844.
- Sutcliffe, Sheila (1973). Martello towers. Cranbury, N. J.: Fairleigh Dickinson Univ. Press. ISBN 9780838613139.
