= Ocean Island =

Ocean Island may refer to:

- Banaba Island, Kiribati (renamed in the 1970s?)
- Kure Atoll, Hawaii, United States (renamed in 1924)
- Ocean Island Inn, a historic building in Victoria, British Columbia, Canada
- Ocean Island, in Port Ross harbour, Auckland Islands, New Zealand
- An alternative name for Tito v Waddell (No 2), a leading English trusts case

== See also ==
- Oceanic island, a type of island
