= HMS Mildura =

Pearl-class cruiser of the Royal Navy

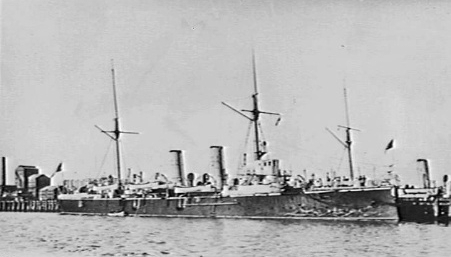
- HMS Mildura at Port Melbourne, May 1901

History

United Kingdom
- Name: Pelorus
- Namesake: Pelorus; Mildura, Victoria
- Builder: Armstrong Whitworth, Elswick, Tyne and Wear
- Laid down: 15 August 1888
- Launched: 27 November 1889
- Completed: 20 December 1890
- Renamed: Mildura, April 1890
- Fate: Sold for scrap, 3 April 1906

General characteristics
- Class & type: Pearl-class cruiser
- Displacement: 2,575 tons
- Length: 278 ft (84.7 m) (oa); 265 ft (80.8 m) (pp)
- Beam: 41 ft (12 m)
- Draught: 15 ft 6 in (4.7 m)
- Installed power: 7,500 shp (5,600 kW); 4 × boilers
- Propulsion: 2 × screws; 2 × 3-cylinder triple-expansion steam engines
- Speed: 19 knots (35 km/h; 22 mph)
- Complement: 210
- Armament: 8 × QF 4.7 inch (120 mm) guns; 8 × 3-pounder guns; 4 × 14-inch (356 mm) torpedo tubes
- Armour: Deck: 1–2 inches (25–51 mm); Gun shields: 2 inches; Conning tower: 3 inches (76 mm)

HMS Mildura was a Pearl-class cruiser built for the Royal Navy in the late 1880s. Originally named HMS Pelorus, she was renamed after an Australian town in April 1890. Per the Imperial Defense Act of 1887, she served primarily in Australian waters.

Captain Henry Leah was in command from April 1897 until April 1900, when Captain Henry C. A. Baynes arrived in Australia on board HMS Diana to take command of the ship. He was succeeded by Captain Charles Kingsmill in September 1900. She was part of the naval escort for the visit of the Duke and Duchess of Cornwall and York (later King George V and Queen Mary) to New Zealand aboard the chartered Royal liner HMS Ophir during 1901. With HMS Royal Arthur (flagship) and HMS Pylades, she visited Norfolk Island in July 1902, Suva, Fiji the following month, and Tonga in September.

She was sold to Garnham, London for scrap in 1906 for £7,200.
