= Walter Hose =

Canadian Royal Navy officer (1875–1965)

Rear-Admiral Walter Hose CBE
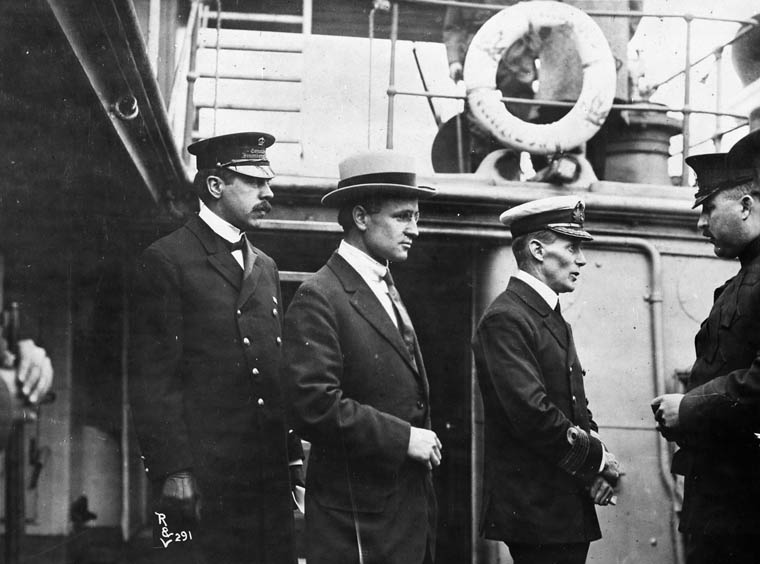
- Walter Hose (third from left) aboard SS Komagata Maru
- Born: 2 October 1875; P&O steamer Surat, Indian Ocean
- Died: 22 June 1965 (aged 89); Windsor, Ontario
- Military career
- Allegiance: United Kingdom; Canada
- Branch: Royal Navy (1889–12); Royal Canadian Navy (1912–34)
- Service years: 1889–1934
- Rank: Rear Admiral
- Commands: Chief of the Naval Staff; HMCS Rainbow
- Conflicts: Boxer Rebellion; First World War: U-boat Campaign
- Awards: Commander of the Order of the British Empire

Rear-Admiral Walter Hose, CBE (2 October 1875 – 22 June 1965) was an officer of the Royal Navy (RN), the Royal Canadian Navy (RCN) and founder of the Royal Canadian Naval Volunteer Reserve (RCNVR). Along with Admiral Sir Charles Kingsmill, Hose is known as the "Father of the Royal Canadian Navy".

== Early life and Royal Navy service ==
Rear Admiral Hose was the son of Anglican bishop George Frederick Hose, brother of Edward Shaw Hose and first cousin of Charles Hose. He was born on a ship in the Indian Ocean and joined the Royal Navy when he was 14. Assigned to HMS Britannia upon entering the service, Hose rose through the ranks and was promoted lieutenant on 31 December 1897 and commander on 31 December 1908.

During these years he held six commands, including commanding gunboats in Asia and a torpedo gunboat with the Royal Navy Home Fleet. He also served in Canadian waters, including when in November 1902 he was appointed to HMS Charybdis, for training men of the Newfoundland R.N.R.

He reached his pinnacle appointment in the Royal Navy as executive officer aboard HMS Cochrane in 1909; however finding advancement too slow he looked into joining the infant Canadian navy.

== Royal Canadian Navy ==
=== HMCS Rainbow and the First World War ===
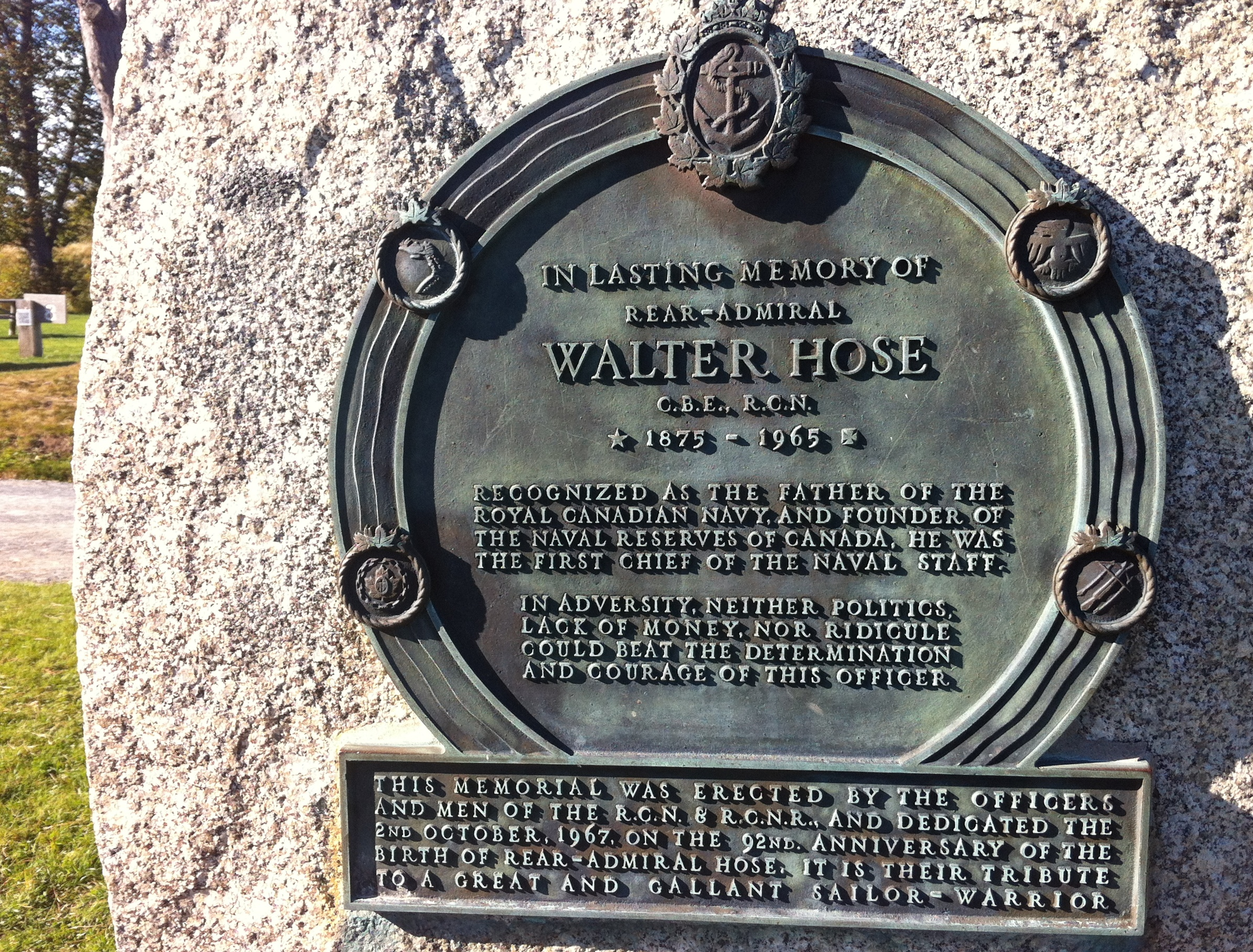
Walter Hose Monument, Point Pleasant Park, Halifax, Nova Scotia

Loaned to the fledgling Royal Canadian Navy as the Captain of HMCS Rainbow in 1911, Hose resigned his commission in 1912 and formally transferred to the RCN. He retained command of HMCS Rainbow and remained stationed at the naval base at Esquimalt where he would play an instrumental role in the creation of Canada's volunteer reserve leading up to the Great War.

In 1912, Hose recommended to Rear Admiral Kingsmill, then Director of the Naval Service, that for the RCN to survive, Canada would require a volunteer citizen navy stationed at naval reserve units across the country. With this advice falling on deaf ears, in 1913 together with a group of businessmen and yachtsmen from Victoria, Hose defiantly created a "Company of Volunteers" who he allowed to use the naval base facilities and instructors under his command. When war was declared in 1914, these unofficial naval volunteers became the core of an 8,000-man Royal Canadian Naval Volunteer Reserve.

With the lack of Royal Navy ships along the northwest Pacific coast, Hose and the Rainbow were ordered to protect shipping from German raiders including the cruisers Leipzig and Nürnberg. After the threat had passed, Commander Hose focused his efforts on preventing German vessels from leaving port and even taking two prizes. He was then named Captain of Patrols by Admiral Kingsmill. As captain of patrols he commanded over fifty vessels to fight the U-boat threat. It was the position he would hold until the end of the war.

=== Interwar service ===
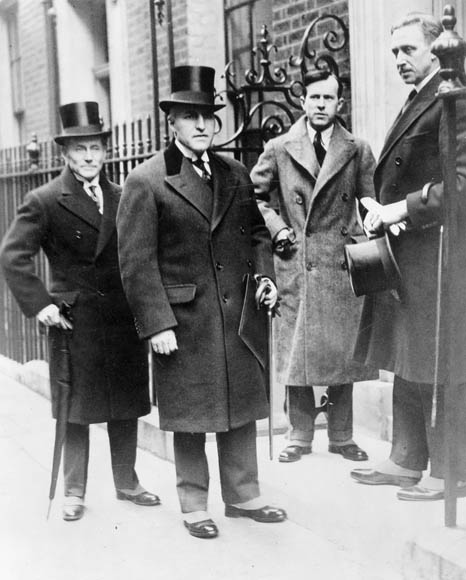
Canadian delegation, Disarmament Conference, London, England. Left to right: Walter Hose, R.C.N., James Ralston, Lester B. Pearson, Maj. H. W. Brown in 1930.

After the retirement of Admiral Kingsmill, Hose was appointed acting Director of the Naval Service in 1921 and Director of the Naval Service in 1922. During his time as commander Hose decommissioned the majority of the navy, and shut the Royal Naval College of Canada and the Youth Training Establishment in Halifax. He took the money saved by doing this and formally created the Royal Canadian Naval Volunteer Reserve.

In 1922 government cuts in the armed services of Canada were put in place and there was an effort by the government of the day to integrate the services under one commander-in-chief. Hose argued against this, demanding to continue to have access to the minister. Aided by the deputy minister George Desbarats, he prevented the navy from falling under the command of the position of the Chief of Staff. The position of Director was renamed as Chief of the Naval Staff in 1928 and he served in this position until his retirement in 1934.

Hose died in Windsor, Ontario, in 1965 and received a full military funeral with six Reserve Petty Officer pallbearers from HMCS Hunter – one of the Naval Reserve units Hose he had created in 1923. A monument at Point Pleasant Park in Halifax, Nova Scotia, honours his work saving and building the Royal Canadian Navy during the difficult years after the First World War and in the Great Depression.

On 22 June 2019, as part of the government of Canada's 'Hometown Heroes' programme, Hose was commemorated at Heavenly Rest Catholic Cemetery in Windsor, Ontario, in a ceremony which referred to him as the "father" of Canada's naval reserve. In the presence of Terry Leahey, Hose's grandson, Vice-Admiral Art McDonald, the commander of the Royal Canadian Navy, spoke of the role he played in Canada's naval history.

== Awards and decorations ==
Hose's personal awards and decorations include the following:

Ribbon	Description	Notes
	Order of the British Empire (CBE)	Decoration awarded 23 April 1920. Awarded as per London Gazette (no Canada Gazette).; Commander level
	China War Medal (1900)	10 June-31 Dec 1900
	1914–15 Star	WWI 1914-1918
	British War Medal	WWI 1914-1918
	Victory Medal (United Kingdom)	WWI 1914-1918
	Order of the Sacred Treasure, 3rd class	Decoration awarded on 28 August 1917; (Japan) Japanese award

== Footnotes ==
Military offices
Preceded by Himself; As Director of the Naval Service	Chief of the Naval Staff; 1928–1934	Succeeded by Percy Nelles
Preceded by Charles Kingsmill	Director of the Naval Service; 1921–1928	Succeeded by Himself; As Chief of the Naval Staff
