= Ocean Island Inn =

Hotel in Victoria. British Columbia, Canada

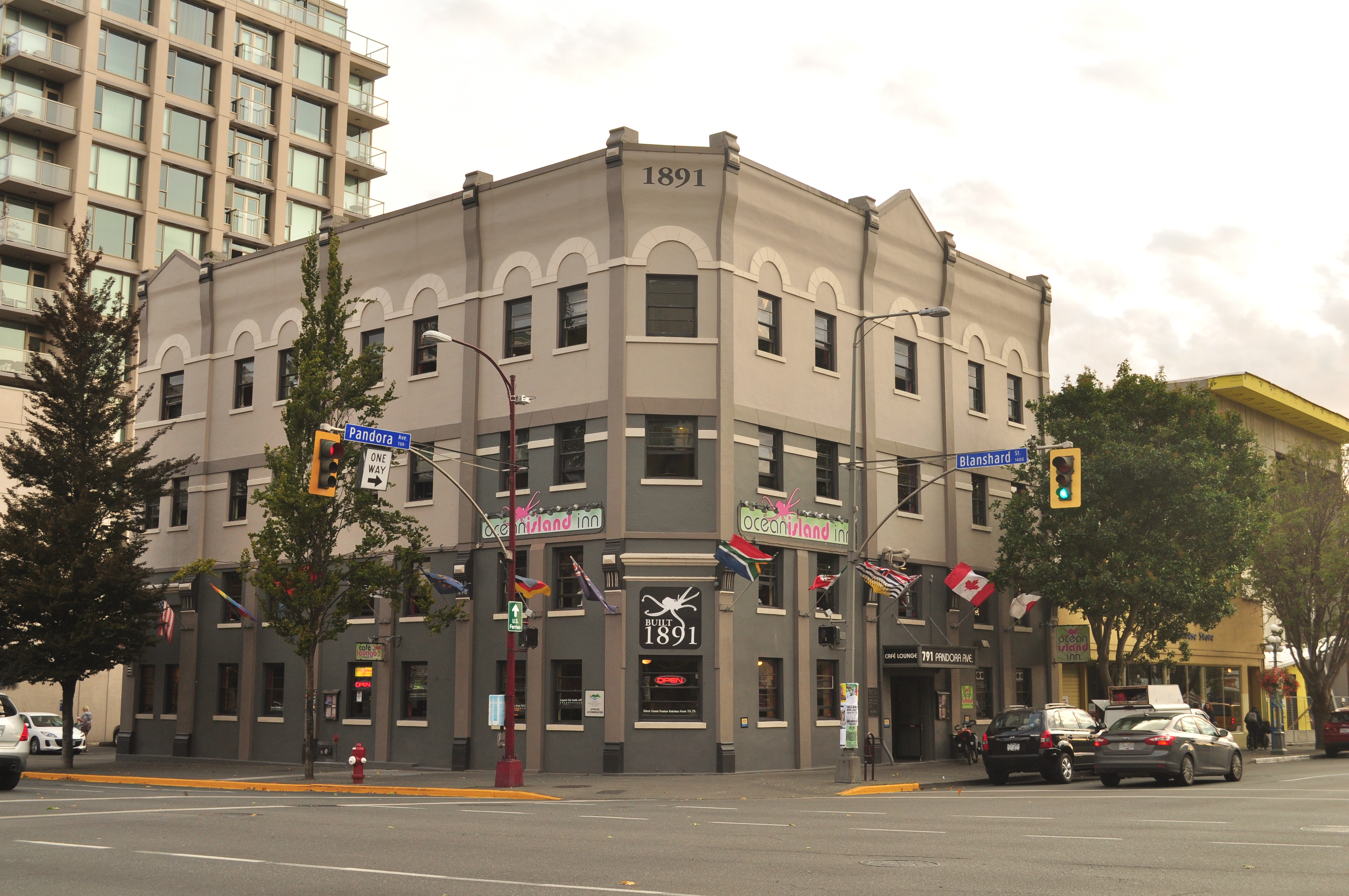
- The Main building

General information
- Location: 791 Pandora Avenue; Victoria, British Columbia; V8W 1N9
- Coordinates: 48.42756°N 123.36202°W
- Opening: 1891

Technical details
- Floor count: 4

Other information
- Number of rooms: 70
- Number of restaurants: 1
- Number of bars: 1
- Parking: Yes

Website
- www.oceanisland.com

Ocean Island Inn is a historic building in Victoria, British Columbia, Canada; it is Vancouver Island's largest backpackers' inn.

Located at 791 Pandora Avenue in downtown Victoria, it is a four-storey heritage building, readily distinguishable by its Italianate architectural form and massing, and by its distinctive beveled corner.

== History ==
Ocean Island Inn is one of the oldest large-scale commercial buildings of its era to survive in this part of Victoria’s downtown. Constructed in 1891 for Carlo Bossi, a prominent pioneer developer and landowner, it is important to the city's heritage because it is representative of the development patterns of the late nineteenth century, which saw the expansion of the City away from the commercial core and the waterfront. Designed as a hotel with commercial spaces at street level, it is significant that it has retained an element of its original function through a major 1944 renovation which converted it to war-time housing, and through to its present-day use as a backpacker's hostel.

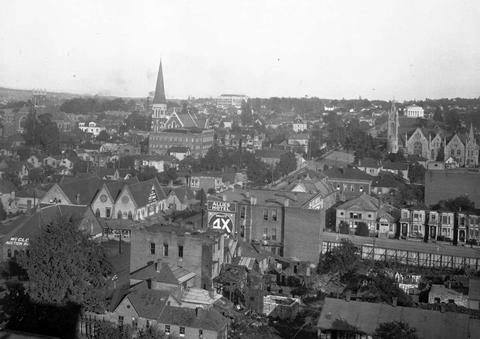

Since 1891, it has been variously known as Osborne House, Pandora Hotel, Allies Hotel, Alexander Apartments, Solomon Apartments and Ocean Island Inn Backpackers Suites. It was called the Alexander Apartments during the 1980s and was purchased by Max Josephson and David and Howie Siegel around 1990 by their company, Yentel Properties and renamed the Solomon Apartments. David thought of commissioning the "Honeymooners" mural that graces the south side of the building. Subsequently, it became, and remains today, the Ocean Island Inn Backpackers Suites.

This building is on a corner lot and has entrances on both Blanshard St (Blanchard St prior to 1906) and Pandora Avenue. The street addresses have changed over time. After 1944 the building only has a Pandora address.

From British Columbia city directories archives, a brief history of the occupants: 1892 - #86 Blanchard is "Bossi Block" - 3-story building constructed.

1893 to 1908: Osborne House Hotel, addressed as 82 or 86 Blanchard Street. Osborne Saloon entrance at 71 Pandora.

1906 - Victoria changes street addresses to new system.

1908 - Osborne Hotel now listed as 1426 Blanshard, and Bishop & Dodge Cleaners are tenants at 1424 Blanshard Street.

1909 - Pandora Hotel opens at 1424 Blanshard Street.

1910 - Pandora Hotel now numbered 1420 Blanshard Street, 765 Pandora opens as the Pandora Saloon.

1912 - Plumber John T Braden occupies ground floor at 1424 Blanshard, stays until 1944.

1917 - Saloon at 765 Pandora now vacant and hotel closed.

1919 or 1920 - Hotel reopens as Allies Hotel, 765 Pandora (1420 Blanshard listed as Mrs. Lillian Walker)

1925 - Allies Hotel closed, building now owned by Mulholland J.

1935 - Building primarily used as furniture/hardware store.

1944/1945 - Building is renovated and becomes a four-story apartment block.

1945 - #789-#795 Pandora is now "Alexander Apartments".

1946 - #791 Pandora - Alexander Apartments with four floors of tenants listed.

1990- Max Josephson, David Siegel and Howie Siegel (Yentel Properties) purchase building at 791 Pandora and rename it the Solomon Apartments.

early 2000s - building becomes the Ocean Island Backpackers' Inn.

== Mural ==
Mural at the rear of the building

The south side of the building has a Trompe-l'œil of "The Honeymooners" – depicting two characters from the television show The Honeymooners – and a Pacific Northwest temperate rainforest mural painted by Robert Scott Dobie, a Vancouver Island-born artist. The mural is 40' wide x 65' tall and is painted with acrylic resin on stucco.

== See also ==
- Hostel
- Adventure travel
- Backpacking (Canada)
- Tourism in Canada
