= Lord Walter Gordon-Lennox =

British Conservative Party politician

The Right Honourable Lord Walter Gordon-Lennox PC
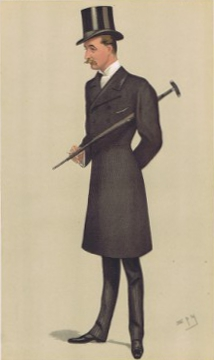
- "Treasurer of the Household". Gordon-Lennox as caricatured by "Spy" in Vanity Fair, February 1892

Treasurer of the Household
- In office 20 November 1891 – 11 August 1892
- Monarch: Victoria
- Prime Minister: The Marquess of Salisbury
- Preceded by: The Earl of Radnor
- Succeeded by: The Earl of Chesterfield

Personal details
- Born: Lord Walter Charles Gordon-Lennox; 29 July 1865 Belgravia, London, England
- Died: 21 October 1922 (aged 57) Bayswater, London, England
- Party: Conservative
- Spouse: Alice Ogilvie-Grant (m. 1889)
- Children: Victor Gordon-Lennox
- Parent(s): Charles Gordon-Lennox, 6th Duke of Richmond; Frances Harriett Greville

Lord Walter Charles Gordon-Lennox, PC (29 July 1865 – 21 October 1922) was a British Conservative politician. He served as Treasurer of the Household from 1891–2 under Lord Salisbury.

== Background ==
Lord Walter Gordon-Lennox was born at 49 Belgrave Square, Belgravia, the youngest of the four sons of Charles Gordon-Lennox, 6th Duke of Richmond, by his wife Frances Harriett Greville, daughter of Algernon Greville. He was educated at Eton and Christ Church, Oxford.

== Political career ==
Lord Walter entered Parliament in 1888 as Member of Parliament for Chichester, a seat he held until 1894. In 1891 he was sworn of the Privy Council and appointed Treasurer of the Household under Lord Salisbury, a post he retained until the government fell the following year.

== Family ==
Lord Walter married Alice Ogilvy-Grant, daughter of the Hon. George Henry Ogilvy-Grant and granddaughter of Francis Ogilvy-Grant, 6th Earl of Seafield, on 6 July 1889. They had at one child, journalist Victor Charles Hugh Gordon-Lennox (1897–1968), who married three times. His second wife was Canadian Diana Kingsmill.

On 23 September 1922, he underwent emergency surgery for acute appendicitis. He appeared to be recovering well but four weeks later suffered a fatal heart attack at his home, 19 Palace Court, Bayswater, aged 57.

Lady Walter Gordon-Lennox died in March 1946, aged 90.

Parliament of the United Kingdom
Preceded by Earl of March	Member of Parliament for Chichester; 1888 – 1894	Succeeded by Lord Edmund Talbot
Political offices
Preceded by The Earl of Radnor	Treasurer of the Household; 1891–1892	Succeeded by The Earl of Chesterfield
