= J. F. C. Wright =

Canadian journalist and historian

- Born: 1904; Wiltshire, England
- Died: 1970 (aged 65–66)
- Occupations: journalist, historian
- Spouse: Diana Kingsmill Wright
- Writing career
- Period: 1940s-1960s
- Notable works: Slava Bohu, Saskatchewan: The History of a Province

James Frederick Church Wright (1904–1970) was a Canadian journalist and historian, who won the Governor General's Award for English-language non-fiction at the 1940 Governor General's Awards for Slava Bohu^{a}, a historical account of Canada's Doukhobor community.

Born in Wiltshire, England in 1904 to Canadian parents who were travelling there, he was raised in Minnedosa, Manitoba. He held a variety of jobs before joining the Saskatoon Star-Phoenix as a journalist, remaining there for seven years. At the time of his Governor General's Award win, he was working in Ottawa, Ontario as a fireman, but later took a scriptwriting job with the National Film Board. He married Diana Kingsmill in 1944 while living in Ottawa, and the couple later moved back to Saskatoon.

Active in the Saskatchewan chapter of the Cooperative Commonwealth Federation, the Wrights became co-editors of Union Farmer, the newspaper of the Saskatchewan Farmers' Union, in 1950.

Wright's later books included All Clear, Canada! (1944), Co-operative Farming in Saskatchewan (1949), Saskatchewan's North (1953), Saskatchewan: The History of a Province (1955), Prairie Progress: Consumer Co-operation in Saskatchewan (1956) and The Louise Lucas Story: This Time Tomorrow (1965).

He committed suicide in 1970.

== Notes ==
a. The non-standard Russian phrase "Slava Bohu" appears about 72 times in the text body. It should be Slava Bogu (Слава Богу : Praise be to God). On page v (Introduction), Wright did not explain that the Canadian Dukhobor dialect is adapted from southern Russian dialects which use the voiced velar fricative. Therefore, the word Bogu (Богу) is pronounced Bohu in Doukhoborese.
