= HMS Royal Arthur (1891) =

Cruiser of the Royal Navy

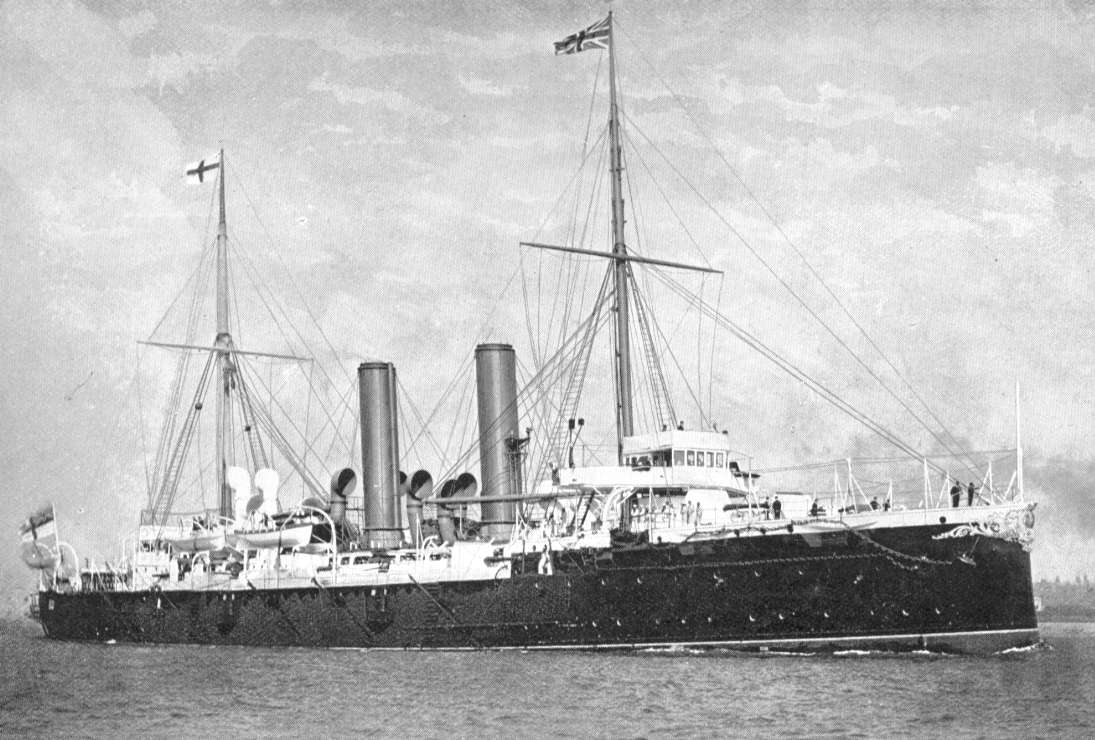

History

United Kingdom
- Name: HMS Royal Arthur
- Builder: Portsmouth Dockyard
- Laid down: 20 January 1890
- Launched: 26 February 1891
- Fate: Sold for breaking up August 1921

General characteristics
- Class & type: Edgar-class cruiser
- Displacement: 7,700 tons
- Length: 387.5 ft (118.1 m)
- Beam: 60.75 ft (18.52 m)
- Armament: 1 × BL 9.2-inch (234 mm) Mk VI gun; 12 × QF 6-inch (152 mm) guns; 12 × 6-pounder (57 mm) guns

HMS Royal Arthur was a first class protected cruiser of the Edgar class, previously named Centaur, but renamed in 1890 prior to launching. She served on the Australia Station and briefly on the North America and West Indies Station before returning to the Home Fleet in 1906. She was paid off after the First World War.

== Service history ==
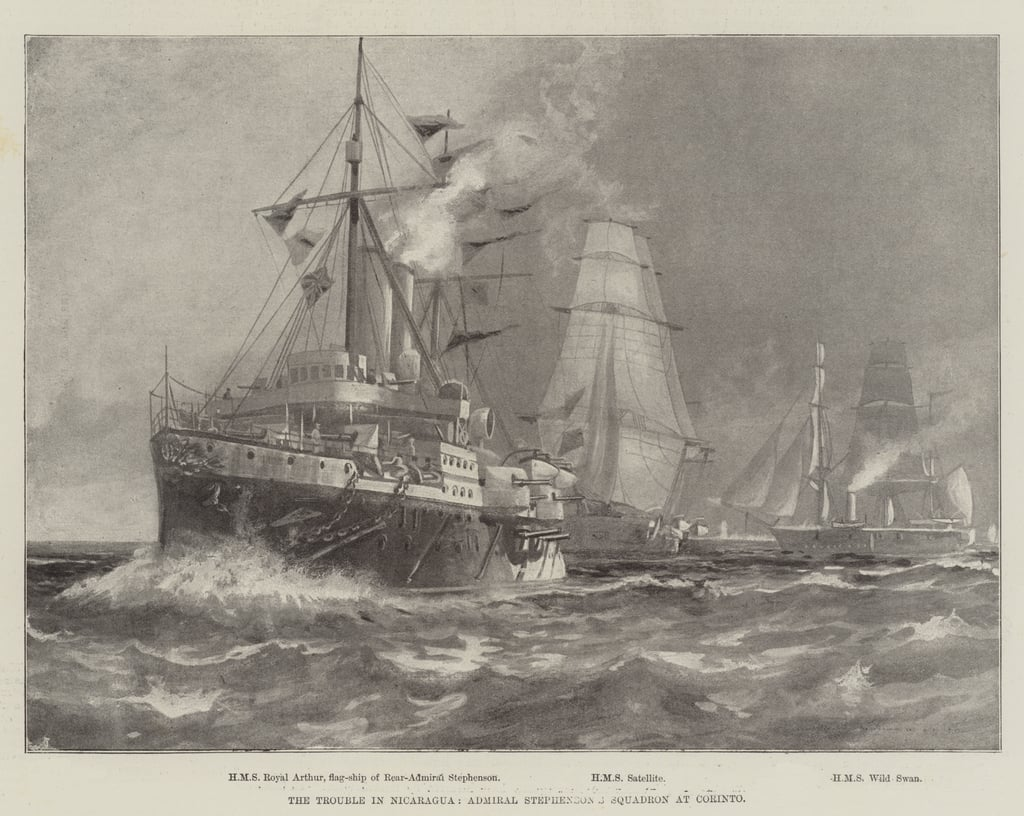
The Trouble in Nicaragua, Admiral Stephenson's Squadron at Corinto. Illustration for The Illustrated London News, 4 May 1895.

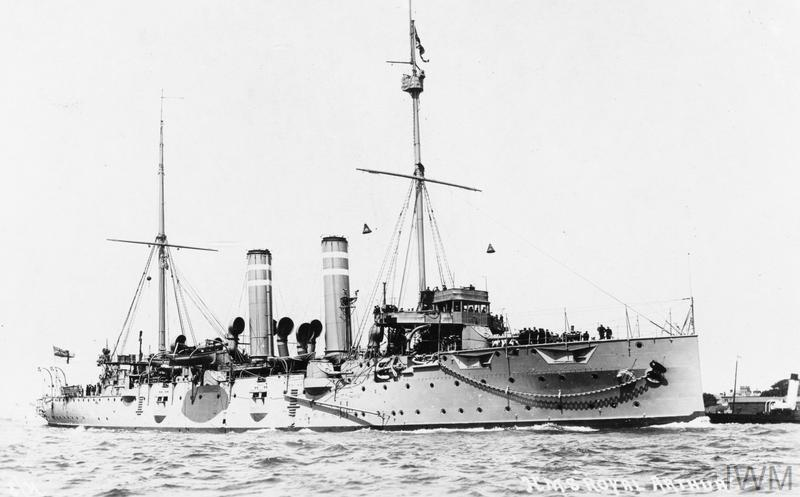
Protected cruiser HMS Royal Arthur

Royal Arthur, and her sister ship Crescent, were built to a slightly modified design and are sometimes considered a separate class. She was built at Portsmouth and launched on 26 February 1891. It was on Nicaragua Crisis of 1894–1895 captained by Henry Frederick Stephenson.

She first was the flagship of the Pacific Station from 1893 to 1896, before being refitted at Portsmouth in 1897. She then served as the flagship of the Australian Station from 1897 to 1904. In that role she provided escort for the royal yacht Ophir carrying the Duke and Duchess of Cornwall and York (the future King George V and Queen Mary) to Australia to open the new Federal Parliament in 1901. She visited Norfolk Island in July 1902, and Suva, Fiji the following month. In January 1903 Vice Admiral Arthur Dalrymple Fanshawe took command of the Australia Station and hoisted his flag on the ship. The following month she visited Russell, Auckland and Wellington in New Zealand. She left the Australia Station on 6 April 1904 and was paid off and refitted at Portsmouth.

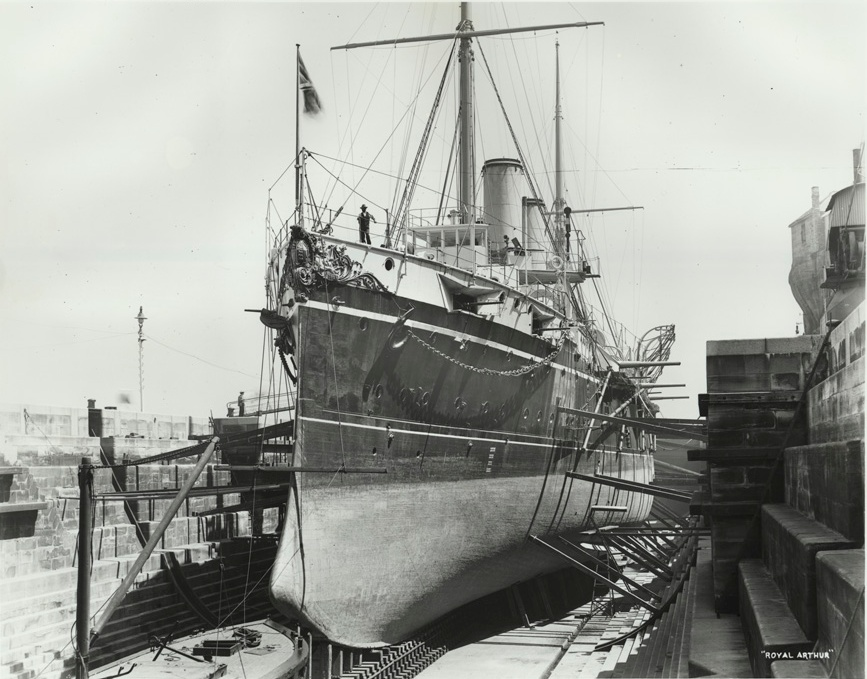
The bow of HMS Royal Arthur while drydocked in Sydney.

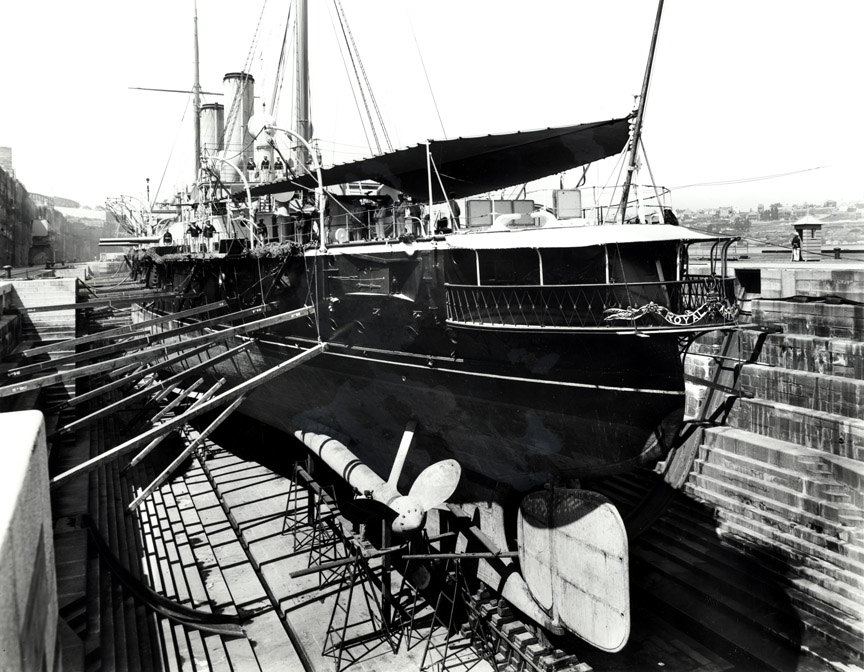
The stern of HMS Royal Arthur while drydocked in Sydney.

She recommissioned in 1905 and served on the North America and West Indies Station before returning to England in 1906. Laid up in reserve for three years, she served as part of the Home Fleet and later Queenstown Training Squadron. She was a guardship at Scapa Flow during the early part of the First World War and later as a submarine depot ship.

In the small hours of September 9th 1914, HMS Royal Arthur collided with the swedish ship s/s Tua. The ship suffered catastrophic damage and started to sink. Lines were cast from the cruiser to help save the crew and all but one crew member, 54 year old machinist Erik Gustav Sjölin, were saved. His body was never found.

== Fate ==
She was paid off in 1920 and sold in August 1921 for breaking up in Germany.

== Sources ==
- Bastock, John (1988), Ships on the Australia Station, Child & Associates Publishing Pty Ltd; Frenchs Forest, Australia. ISBN 0-86777-348-0
- Colledge, J. J.; Warlow, Ben (2006) [1969]. Ships of the Royal Navy: The Complete Record of All Fighting Ships of the Royal Navy from the 15th Century to the Present (3rd Rev ed.). London: Chatham Publishing. ISBN 978-1-86176-281-8. OCLC 67375475.
- Roger Chesneau and Eugene M. Kolesnik, ed., Conway's All the World's Fighting Ships 1860–1905, (Conway Maritime Press, London, 1979), ISBN 0-85177-133-5
