= Edmund Lamb =

English landowner, colliery proprietor and radical Liberal politician

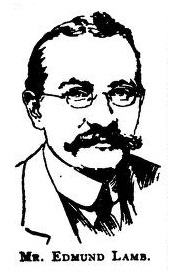

Edmund George Lamb MA FCS FRGS (8 July 1863 – 3 January 1925) was an English landowner, colliery proprietor, and radical Liberal Party politician.

== Background ==
He was the son of Richard Westbrook Lamb JP DL of West Denton, Northumberland and Georgiana Eaton of Ketton Hall, Rutland. He was educated at Oratory School, Edgbaston and Merton College, Oxford where he received a Master of Arts and finally University College, London. In 1893 he married Mabel Winkworth (1862–1941), daughter of a Manchester cotton mill owner. They had one child, Winifred Lamb (1894–1963). She was a classical archaeologist, and author of several works on ancient Greece.

== Professional career ==
Lamb was a colliery proprietor in Northumberland, and a landowner in Northumberland and Sussex. He was a Fellow of the Chemical Society. He was a Fellow of the Royal Geographical Society.

== Political career ==
He was elected at the 1906 general election as the Liberal Member of Parliament (MP) for the Leominster division of Herefordshire, unseating the sitting Conservative MP Sir James Rankin.

In parliament he was an advocate of the abolition of the House of Lords.

He was defeated at the January 1910 election by the Conservative candidate Sir James Rankin, who he had ousted. This was despite polling more votes than when he had won in 1906. He did not contest the December 1910 general election or the Leominster by-election in 1912 when no Liberal stood. Leominster Liberals wanted him to run in 1912 but he declined. He retained involvement with the local Liberal association, being elected as its President.

He decided to fight the post-war general election of December 1918 at Leominster in an attempt to regain his old seat. He was the official candidate of Leominster Liberal Association, though some records describe him as an 'Independent Radical'. His task had been made difficult firstly when the Lloyd George led Coalition Government chose to endorse his Unionist opponent. It was further handicapped by the intervention of another Liberal standing as an 'Agriculture' candidate, backed by the Herefordshire Farmers Union who advocated support for Lloyd George. Unsurprisingly the Unionists held the seat.

He did not stand for parliament again.

=== Election results ===
General election January 1906: Leominster
Party	Candidate	Votes	%	±%
Liberal	Edmund George Lamb	3,892	50.2	
Conservative	Sir James Rankin	3,864	49.8	
Majority		28	0.4	
Turnout			83.1	
Liberal gain from Conservative		Swing		

General election January 1910: Leominster
Party	Candidate	Votes	%	±%
Conservative	Sir James Rankin	4,822	54.7	
Liberal	Edmund George Lamb	3,991	45.3	
Majority		831	9.4	
Turnout			91.0	+7.9
Conservative gain from Liberal		Swing		

General election 1918: Leominster
Party	Candidate	Votes	%	±%
Unionist	Maj. Charles Lionel Atkins Ward-Jackson	8,308	50.5	
Liberal	Edmund George Lamb	5,291	32.1	
Agriculture	Ernest Wilfred Langford	2,870	17.4	n/a
Majority		3,017	18.4	
Turnout			62.9	
Unionist hold		Swing		

== Publications ==
In 1926 he had published a family history Some Annals of the Lambs, a Border Family. He retired to West Sussex where he was elected a member of the County Council.

Parliament of the United Kingdom
Preceded by Sir James Rankin	Member of Parliament for Leominster; 1906 – January 1910	Succeeded by Sir James Rankin
