= Hugh Rankin =

Hugh Rankin may refer to:

- Hugh Doak Rankin (1878–1956), American artist
- Sir Hugh Rankin, 3rd Baronet (1899–1988), British eccentric
