= Rankin baronets of Bryngwyn (1898) =

Escutcheon of the Rankin baronets of Bryngwyn

The Rankin baronetcy, of Bryngwyn in Much Dewchurch in the County of Hereford, was created in the Baronetage of the United Kingdom on 20 June 1898 for the politician James Rankin, Member of Parliament for Leominster from 1880 to 1885, and for North Herefordshire from 1886 to 1906, and from 1910 to 1912.

The 2nd Baronet was a soldier, war correspondent and writer on history and travel. The 3rd Baronet was a noted eccentric. He assumed by deed poll the additional surname of Stewart in 1932 but discontinued it by deed poll in 1946. He also assumed the forename of Hugh in lieu of Hubert.

The 4th Baronet was the nephew of the 3rd Baronet. His eldest son became the 5th Baronet on his death in 2020.

== Rankin baronets, of Bryngwyn (1898) ==
- Sir James Rankin, 1st Baronet (1842–1915)
- Sir (James) Reginald Lea Rankin, 2nd Baronet (1871–1931)
- Sir Hugh Charles Rhys Rankin, 3rd Baronet (1899–1988)
- Sir Ian Niall Rankin, 4th Baronet (1932–2020)
- Sir Gavin Niall Rankin, 5th Baronet (born 1962)

The heir apparent to the baronetcy is the current holder's elder son, Tassilo Laurence Rankin (born 1998).

== Notes ==
Baronetage of the United Kingdom
Preceded by Dundas baronets	Rankin baronets of Bryngwyn; 20 June 1898	Succeeded by Tate baronets
