= Tate baronets =

Baronetcy in the Baronetage of the United Kingdom

Escutcheon of the Tate baronets of Park Hill

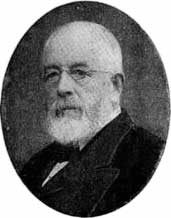
Sir Henry Tate, 1st Baronet

The Tate Baronetcy, of Park Hill in Streatham in the County of London, is a title in the baronetage of the United Kingdom. It was created on 27 June 1898 for the sugar magnate and philanthropist Henry Tate, founding donor of the Tate Gallery, which opened in London in 1897.

The 2nd Baronet was High Sheriff of Lancashire in 1907, and the 4th Baronet served as High Sheriff of Rutland in 1949. The 5th Baronet served as managing director of the family company Tate & Lyle. He was later chairman of the London Commodity Exchange.

== Tate baronets, of Park Hill (1898) ==
- Sir Henry Tate, 1st Baronet (1819–1899)
- Sir William Henry Tate, 2nd Baronet (1842–1921)
- Sir Ernest William Tate, 3rd Baronet (1867–1939)
- Sir Henry Tate, 4th Baronet (1902–1994)
- Sir (Henry) Saxon Tate, 5th Baronet (1931–2012)
- Sir Edward Nicholas Tate, 6th Baronet (born 1966)

The heir presumptive is the present holder's brother Duncan Saxon Tate (born 1968).

== Extended family ==
Mavis Tate married in 1925 Henry Burton Tate, grandson of the 1st Baronet, this being the second marriage of each.

Baronetage of the United Kingdom
Preceded by Rankin baronets	Tate baronets of Park Hill; 27 June 1898	Succeeded by Thompson baronets
