= 52 Cadogan Square =

House in Knightsbridge, London, England

Coordinates: 51°29′43″N 0°09′41″W

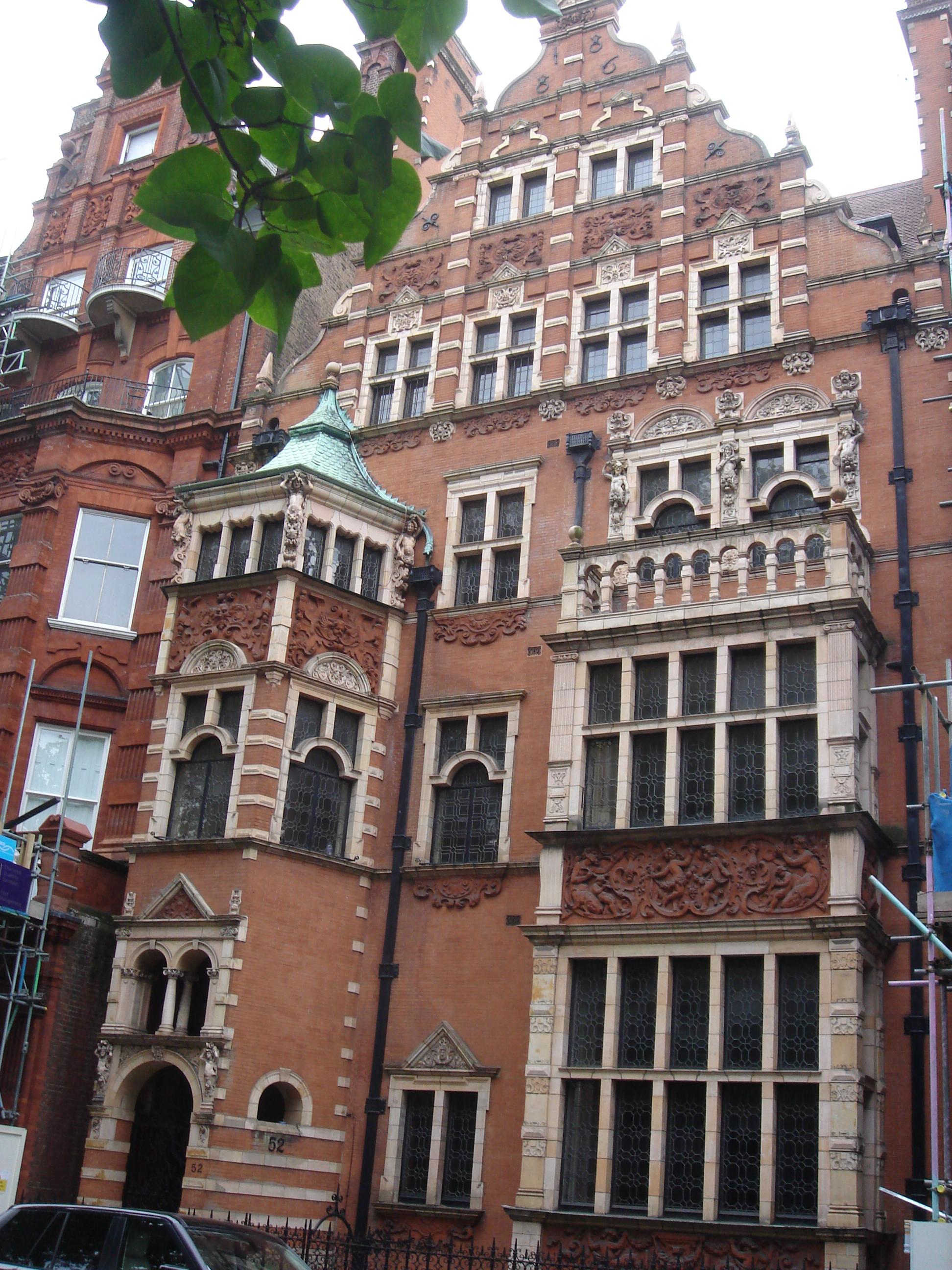
52 Cadogan Square

52 Cadogan Square is a Grade II* listed house on Cadogan Square in the Chelsea area of London, England.

The house was built in 1886–87, and the architect was Sir Ernest George. It was constructed for Sir Thomas Andros de la Rue, 1st Baronet, who was the chairman of security printers De La Rue. He died at 52 Cadogan Square on 10 April 1911 and was buried at Golders Green.
