= 140 Corps Engineer Regiment, Royal Engineers =

140 Corps Engineer Regiment, RE
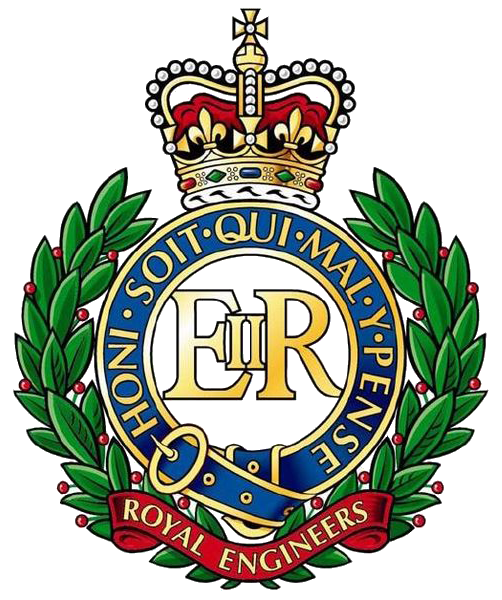
- Cap badge of the Corps of Royal Engineers
- Active: 1 May 1961–1 April 1967
- Country: United Kingdom
- Branch: Territorial Army (United Kingdom)
- Role: Corps Engineers
- Size: Regiment
- Part of: Royal Engineers
- Garrison/HQ: Nottingham

140 Corps Engineer Regiment was a short-lived Territorial Army (TA) unit of the Royal Engineers based in the North Midlands of England during the 1960s.

== Organisation ==
The regiment was formed on 1 May 1961 from individual batteries of TA Royal Artillery regiments that were being broken up. Three of these batteries were transferred to the Royal Engineers (RE) and redesignated as squadrons, giving the regiment the following composition:

140 Corps Engineer Regiment

- Regimental Headquarters at Nottingham
- 438 (Derbyshire Artillery) Field Squadron at Derby – former P (North Midland) Battery from 438 Light Anti-Aircraft Regiment, continuing the traditions of 4th North Midland Brigade, Royal Field Artillery
- 575 (Sherwood Foresters) Field Squadron at Chesterfield – former 575 (Sherwood Foresters) Light Anti-Aircraft Regiment, continuing the traditions of 6th Battalion, Sherwood Foresters
- 115 (Leicestershire) Field Park Squadron at Leicester – former R Battery from 350 (The Robin Hood Foresters) Light Regiment, continuing the traditions of the Leicestershire Royal Horse Artillery

== Disbandment ==
140 Corps Engineer Rgt was disbanded in 1967 when the TA was reduced to the Territorial and Army Volunteer Reserve. RHQ was converted into RHQ for 73 Engineer Rgt at Nottingham, while elements of 438 and 575 Sqns went as infantry to the Derbyshire Battalion, Sherwood Foresters and 115 Sqn to the TAVR III contingent of the Leicestershire Regiment. In 1969 the Derbyshire Battalion was reduced to a cadre (later C (Derbyshire Foresters) Company in 3rd (Volunteer) Bn Worcestershire and Sherwood Foresters Regiment) and 575 (The Sherwood Foresters) Fd Sqn at Chesterfield and Derby was reformed in 73 Engineer Regiment.

575 Field Squadron was withdrawn from the army's order of battle under the 2020 Army Reserve structure changes and was disbanded in 2014, two troops and the Chesterfield TA Centre (Wallis Barracks) being transferred to 350 (Sherwood Foresters) Fd Sqn in 33 Engineer Regiment (EOD).

== External sources ==
- British Army units from 1945 on
- Land Forces of Britain, the Empire and Commonwealth – Regiments.org (archive site)
