= Dundas baronets of Arniston (1898) =

Escutcheon of the Dundas baronets of Arniston

The Dundas baronetcy, of Arniston in the County of Midlothian, was created in the Baronetage of the United Kingdom on 18 June 1898 for Robert Dundas, Chairman of the Midlothian County Council. The title became extinct on the death of the 7th Baronet in 1970.

== Dundas baronets, of Arniston (1898) ==
- Sir Robert Dundas, 1st Baronet (1823–1909)
- Sir Robert Dundas, 2nd Baronet (1857–1910)
- Sir Henry Herbert Philip Dundas, 3rd Baronet (1866–1930)
- Sir Philip Dundas, 4th Baronet (1899–1952)
- Sir Henry Matthew Dundas, 5th Baronet (1937–1963)
- Sir James Durham Dundas, 6th Baronet (1905–1967)
- Sir Thomas Calderwood Dundas, 7th Baronet (1906–1970). He left no heir.

== Notes ==
Baronetage of the United Kingdom
Preceded by de La Rue baronets	Dundas baronets of Arniston; 18 June 1898	Succeeded by Rankin baronets
