= Leicester Town Rifles =

Volunteer unit of the British Army (1859–1967)

Leicester Town Rifles 4th Battalion Leicestershire Regiment 44th Searchlight Regiment, RA 121st Light AA Regiment, RA
- Active: 31 August 1859
- Country: United Kingdom
- Branch: Territorial Army
- Role: Infantry; Air Defence
- Garrison/HQ: Leicester
- Engagements: WWI: Hohenzollern Redoubt; Lens; 3rd Ypres; Cambrai; German spring offensive St Quentin Canal; WWII: Blitz; North West Europe

Commanders
- Notable commanders: Sir Henry St John Halford, Bt

The Leicester Town Rifles was an early unit of the British Volunteer Force raised in 1859. It went on to become the parent unit of the Territorial Army battalions of the Leicestershire Regiment, which served on the Western Front during World War I. Their successor unit served in the air defence role during and after World War II.

== Origin ==
The enthusiasm for the Volunteer movement following an invasion scare in 1859 saw the creation of many Rifle Volunteer Corps (RVCs) composed of part-time soldiers eager to supplement the Regular British Army in time of need. One such unit was the Leicester Town Rifles, formed in the East Midlands town (later city) of Leicester. Mansfield Turner was appointed captain of the new unit; his commission dated 31 August 1859 was considered to be the founding date of the company, which was designated the 1st Leicestershire RVC.

On 10 July 1860, all ten RVCs that had been raised in Leicestershire were consolidated into a single administrative battalion:

1st Administrative Battalion Leicestershire RVC

- 1st (1st Leicester Town Rifles) Leicestershire RVC
- 2nd (Duke of Rutland's Belvoir Rifles) Leicestershire RVC
- 3rd (Melton Company) Leicestershire RVC
- 4th (2nd Leicester Town Rifles) Leicestershire RVC
- 5th (3rd Leicester Town Rifles) Leicestershire RVC
- 6th (Loughborough) Leicestershire RVC
- 7th (Lutterworth) Leicestershire RVC (disbanded in 1873)
- 8th (Ashby-de-la-Zouch) Leicestershire RVC
- 9th (Leicester Town) Leicestershire RVC
- 10th (Hinckley) Leicestershire RVC

Turner was promoted to Lieutenant-colonel to command the battalion on 10 July 1860; he was succeeded in command of the 1st Corps by Sir Henry St John Halford, Bt. Halford in turn succeeded Turner as Lt-Col in 1863 and was in command for most of the next three decades.

In 1880, the Administrative Battalion was consolidated as the 1st Leicestershire RVC, of two battalions, and on 1 July the following year, as part of the Childers reforms, it became the Volunteer Battalion of the Leicestershire Regiment, changing its title in February 1883 to 1st Volunteer Battalion, Leicestershire Regiment. An additional company had been formed at Market Harborough in 1882, and in 1900 four more were added at Leicester (two), Wigston and Mountsorrel, after which it operated as a double-battalion unit.

The battalion provided detachments of volunteers to serve alongside the Regulars during the Second Boer War, earning the Battle honour South Africa 1900–1902.

== Territorial Force ==
When the Volunteer Force was subsumed into the Territorial Force in 1908 as part of the Haldane Reforms, the double-battalion 1st Volunteer Bn formed both the 4th and 5th Battalions of the Leicestershire Regiment. The 5th Battalion had the companies from the country towns, while the 4th Battalion was recruited entirely from Leicester itself, with the exception of detachments at Anstey and Syston in Charnwood, and H Company at Wigston on the south side of the city. The headquarters of the 4th Battalion was at the Magazine in Oxford Street, Leicester, which it shared with the Leicestershire Yeomanry and the Leicestershire Royal Horse Artillery. The 4th and 5th Battalions both formed part of the Lincoln & Leicester Brigade of the North Midland Division of the TF.

== World War I ==
=== Mobilisation ===
On the outbreak of war in August 1914, the battalion mobilised at the Magazine (enlisting many old soldiers from the National Reserve) and on 12 August entrained for the war station of the Lincoln & Leicester Brigade at Belper. The battalion was seen off by its Honorary Colonel, the Duke of Rutland, whose son and heir, the Marquess of Granby was a subaltern in the battalion.

While at Belper, the battalion was invited to volunteer for foreign service. This was accepted by the majority of the men. During September, a 2nd-Line TF battalion designated the 2/4th was formed at Leicester from the Home Service men and new recruits, the original battalion becoming the 1/4th. Later, a 3/4th or Reserve Battalion was formed to provide drafts to the battalions serving overseas.

=== 1/4th Battalion ===
The Lincoln & Leicester Bde only stayed a few days at Belper before moving to Luton, where the Division was concentrating. It later moved to Bishop's Stortford to train for deployment overseas with the British Expeditionary Force (BEF). The 1/4th Bn embarked from Southampton and landed at Le Havre in France on 3 March 1915. By 8 March, the North Midland Division had completed its concentration – the first complete TF formation to arrive on the Western Front. It was numbered the 46th (North Midland) Division in May, when the Lincoln & Leicester Brigade was numbered 138th (Lincoln and Leicester) Brigade.

Beginning on 26 March, a company at a time of the battalion went into the trenches under the instruction of the 1st Bn King's Own and 2nd Bn Essex Regiment, and on 4 April, facing Spanbroekmolen on the Messines Ridge, the complete battalion took over its own sector of the line for the first time. Thereafter, it participated in the round of reliefs, rotating trench-holding with fatigues, in the Sanctuary Wood and Hill 60 sectors in the Ypres Salient. The battalion suffered a steady trickle of casualties, but was not engaged in any serious fighting.

==== Hohenzollern Redoubt ====
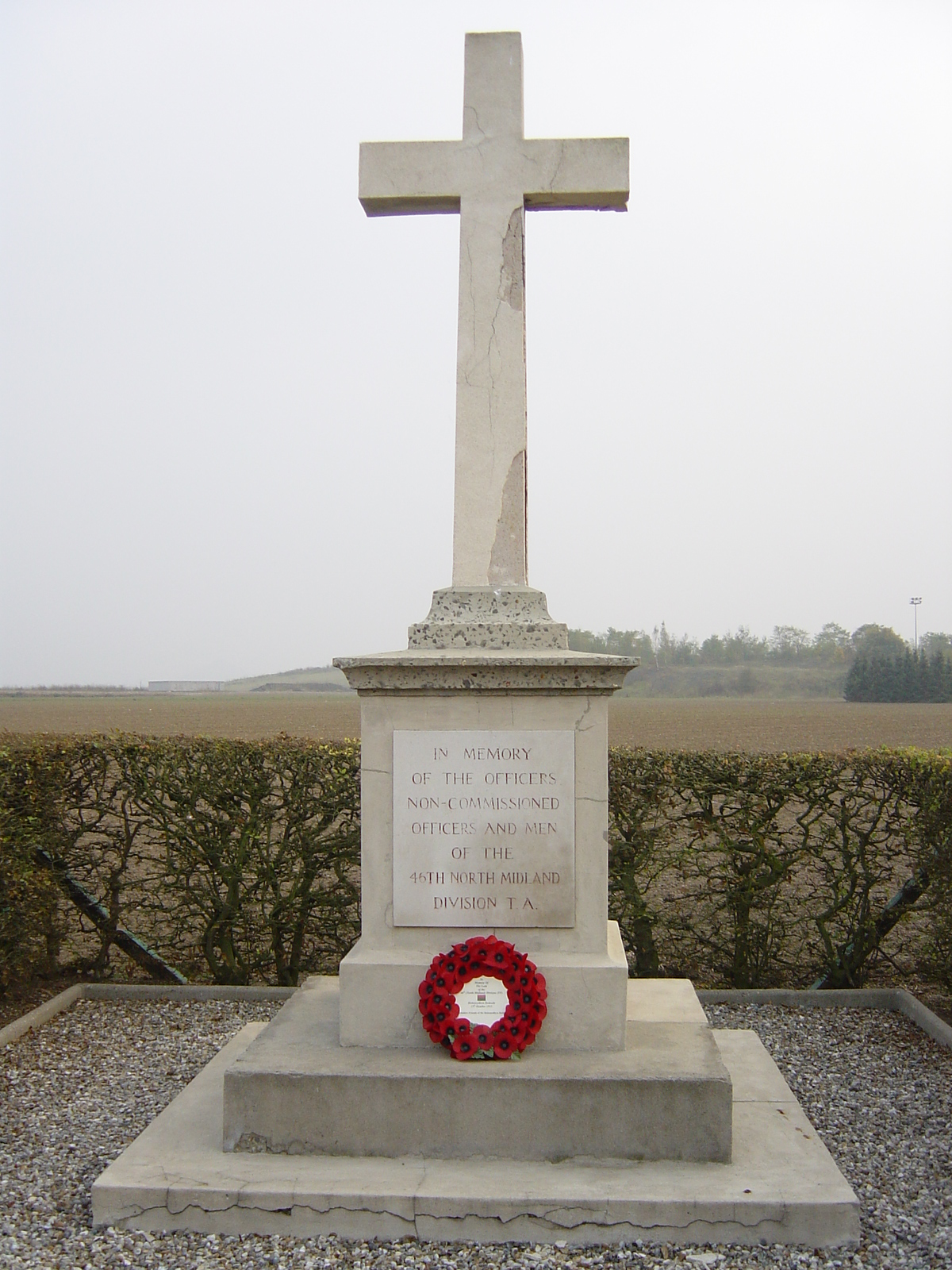
46th Division memorial at Vermelles, starting point for the division's attack on 13 October 1915

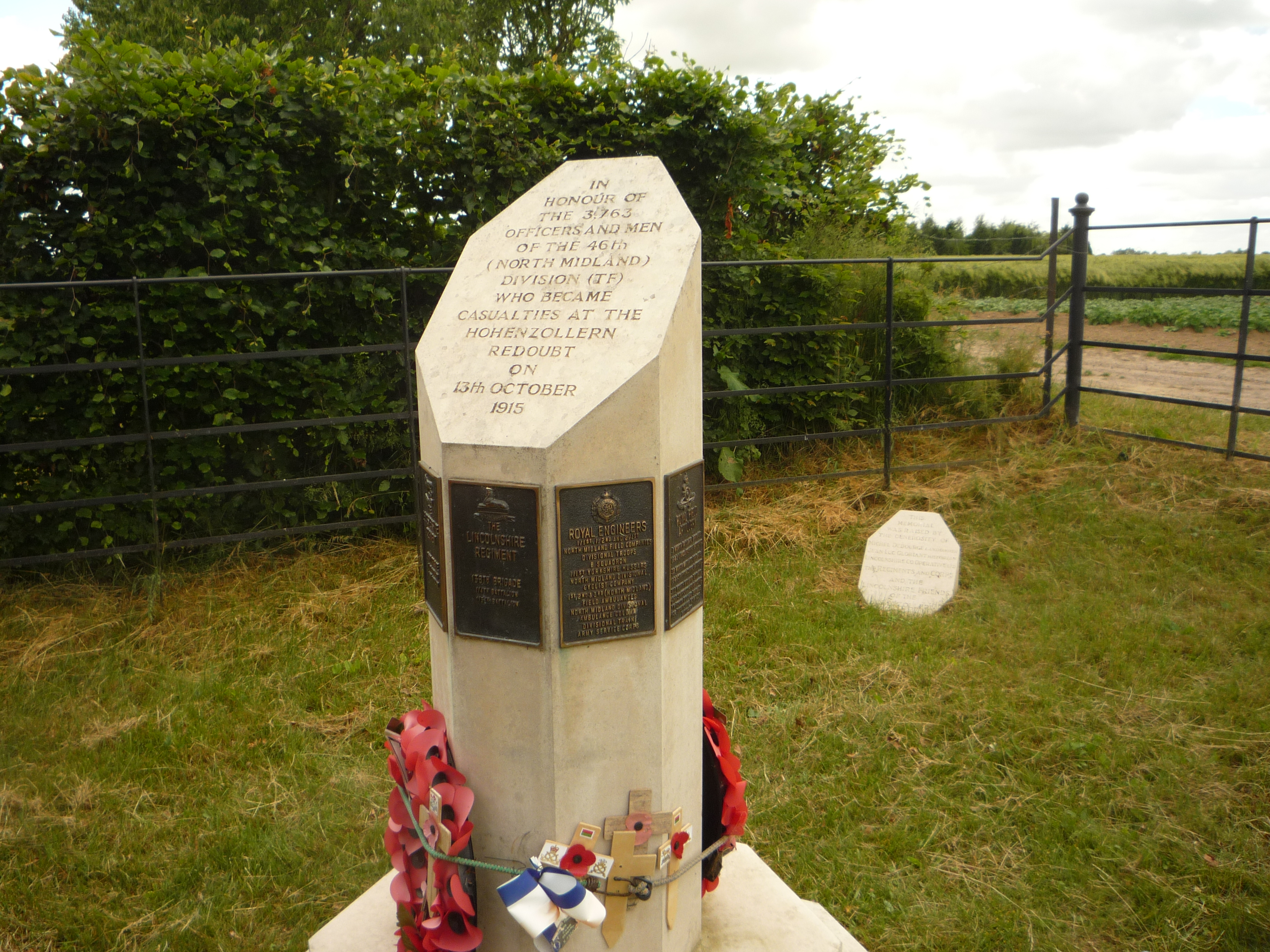
46th (North Midland) Division's memorial at Cité de Madagascar, site of the Hohenzollern Redoubt

In October 1915, 1/4th Leicesters left Ypres and moved to Loos, where the 46th Division was to attack the German strongpoint known as the Hohenzollern Redoubt, briefly captured during the recent Battle of Loos but subsequently lost. The attack went in at 14.00 on 13 October behind a bombardment and gas cloud, with the 1/4th Leicesters aiming for the point of the salient formed by the strongpoint. The battalion went forward in four waves, each of which was caught by machine gun and artillery fire; few of the men got into the German line, and they were unable to maintain their position. The battalion's casualties were 20 officers and 453 other ranks; only 188 NCOs and men returned to the jumping-off trench and answered rollcall that evening.

After receiving drafts of reinforcements from the 3/4th Bn, the 1/4th Bn entrained for Marseille, where on 21 January 1916 it boarded HM Transport Andania bound for Egypt. However, the movement was immediately cancelled, and the troops disembarked next day. Most of the division that had already departed had to be brought back from Egypt.

==== Gommecourt ====
In March and April 1916, 1/4th Bn held trenches in the Vimy Ridge sector and then went into reserve before moving into the line opposite Gommecourt in late May to prepare for the forthcoming Somme Offensive.

The 1/4th Leicesters was designated as the reserve battalion of the reserve brigade, and did not go into the attack, where the Staffordshire Brigade and Sherwood Foresters lost very heavily. The battalion finally captured Gommecourt in February 1917 when the Germans began their withdrawal to the Hindenburg Line.

==== Lens and Hill 70 ====
In April 1917, the division moved to the Lens area and became involved in 10 weeks' bloody fighting round Hill 70, during which the battalion suffered many casualties. The division handed over the line to the 2nd Canadian Division in early July, having secured the jumping-off positions from which the Canadian Corps launched the successful Battle of Hill 70 in August.

46th (North Midland) Division was not used offensively again until September 1918, spending its time in tours of duty holding the front line in quiet sectors. The reorganisation of the BEF in January 1918 led to the disbandment of the 2/5th Leicesters, a draft of whom were sent to reinforce the 1/4th Bn. After the 2/4th Bn was disbanded in June (see below) the 1/4th was simply referred to as the 4th Bn.

==== St Quentin Canal ====
The division was given the most difficult task in the Battle of the St. Quentin Canal on 29 September 1918: it had to cross the canal itself, where it constituted part of the Hindenburg Line. 4th Leicesters had the task of making a preliminary attack on Pike Wood and Peg Copse on the night of 27 September, supported by the guns of an Australian field artillery brigade. Unlike the rest of the carefully planned battle, this attack was hastily arranged. At sunset, A and B Companies supported by C and D advanced over 700 yards (650 m) of No man's land towards the German positions, following the creeping barrage. The barrage kept the Germans in their dugouts and the attack took them by surprise, A Company reaching their objective without a shot being fired, and only one platoon met resistance, while B Company reached their objective with just three casualties. Pike Wood was put in a state of defence and was intermittently attacked during the night, with German bombing parties trying to work their way back up trenches into the position. 4th Leicesters suffered serious casualties before they handed the position over next morning to the battalions of the Staffordshire Brigade who were to make the main attack.

For the main attack on 29 September, 138th (Lincoln & Leicester) Brigade was in the second phase. Before Zero Hour the battalion moved up through the morning fog, under gas shelling that caused significant casualties (No 4 Platoon losing 22 men out of 26). B Company led, with the role of mopping up after the advancing Staffords, during which they took many prisoners. The rest of the battalion passed through, crossed the canal, and reached the Brown Line. Although the battalion's CO (Lt-Col F.W. Foster) and adjutant (Capt D.W. Howarth) were both wounded, the battalion attacked towards its final objective, the Yellow Line, 1000 yards (900 m) beyond the Brown Line. There was little enemy resistance and the battalion had taken all its objectives by noon. The rest of the brigade subsequently passed through to take the next two objectives.

==== The pursuit ====
138th Brigade was once again in support during the Battle of Ramicourt (3 October), taking up the attack during the afternoon, with 4th Leicesters passing through Ramicourt itself and then advancing over open ground to reach a sunken road at Montbrehain occupied by the Sherwood Foresters and a variety of other detachments. The battalion took up position along the railway embarkment from Ramicourt to Montbrehain and held it through the night under attack by German aircraft using parachute flares.

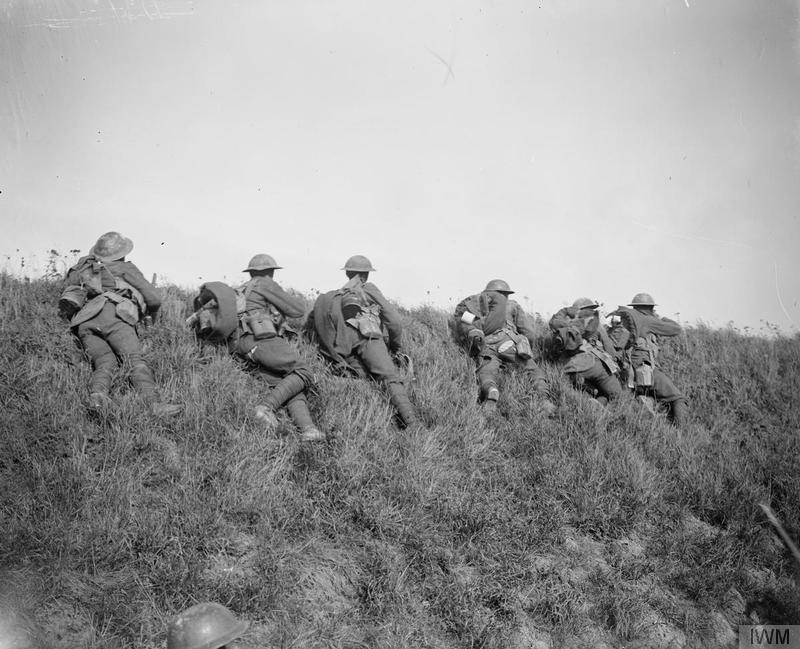
Men of 4th Leicesters firing at German snipers and machine gunners on the edge of Riqueval Wood near Bohain, 10 October 1918

On 10 October, patrols of 4th Leicesters, advancing cautiously along the Bohain–Aisonville road, were met by heavy machine-gun fire from the fringes of Riqueval Wood, and all attempts to enter it were repulsed. the battalion suffering considerable casualties. The wood held the division up for nearly a week.

As part of the Battle of Andigny, 4th Leicesters attacked again at dawn on 17 October, round the flank of Riqueval Wood, uphill towards the Bohain–Wassigny road and Vaux-Andigny, behind a barrage awkwardly fired from a flank, which caused some casualties from friendly fire. The battalion took its objectives, which consisted of hastily dug trenches and rifle pits, and mopped-up the machine-gun nests left behind by the retreating Germans. The battalion was relieved in the evening by the 5th Leicesters and went back to rest billets at Fresnoy-le-Grand. The battalion left again on 1 November, and marched in the pursuit until the Armistice of 11 November 1918 came into effect.

46th Division moved to the Le Cateau in January 1919 where demobilisation began. The last cadres returned to England in June, the 4th Leicesters was disembodied on 2 July, and the division began reforming in 1920.

=== 2/4th Battalion ===
The 2nd Line battalion was formed in September 1914 at Leicester from men who had not volunteered for overseas service, together with the many new recruits under training. Mirroring its 1st Line parent, the battalion formed part of 2nd Lincoln & Leicester Brigade in 2nd North Midland Division; these were later numbered 177th (2/1st Lincoln and Leicester) Brigade and 59th (2nd North Midland) Division respectively. Training was carried out at Luton and later St Albans. When the 59th Division began training for overseas service, the Home Service details of 2/4th Leicesters and other battalions of the 2nd Lincoln & Leicester Brigade went to the 28th Provisional Battalion, later the 13th Bn Lincolnshire Regiment, a home defence unit disbanded in October 1917.

==== Ireland ====
In April 1916, the 2/4th battalion was sent to Dublin to help quell disturbances following the Easter Rising – the troops of the 59th Division were the first TF units to serve in Ireland. After the suppression of the trouble, the division moved to Curragh Camp and resumed training. It returned to England in January 1917 and began final battle training at Fovant, where there was a large purpose-built camp on the edge of the Salisbury Plain training area, before beginning to embark for France on 17 February. 2/4th Leicesters landed on 24 February.

==== 3rd Ypres ====
The 59th Division took part in following the German Retreat to Hindenburg Line in March and April, but it was not until September that it was engaged in its first full-scale action, the phase of the 3rd Ypres Offensive known as the Battle of the Menin Road Ridge. 177th Brigade was in support for this successful assault. This was a carefully prepared assault with massive artillery preparation, and most of the objectives were taken easily. The next phase, the Battle of Polygon Wood (26 September), when 177th Bde was in support, was equally successful.

==== Bourlon Wood ====
59th Division was next moved south to join in the Battle of Cambrai. The division entered the recently captured line between Cantaing and Bourlon Wood on 28 November. Fierce German counter-attacks began on 30 November, and 177th Brigade was ordered to prepare the village of Flesquières for all-round defence By 4 December, the decision had been made to withdraw from the Bourlon Salient to the Flesquières Line, and 59th Division with 177th Bde in front held covering positions while this was carried out. At 14.30 on 6 December a hostile barrage came down on 59th Division's positions and an hour later German infantry advanced, the defenders in Flesquières inflicting heavy casualties on them before withdrawing as planned at 17.30. By 7 December the British were back on the line that they would hold for the coming winter.

==== German Offensive ====
When the German spring offensive opened on 21 March 1918, (the Battle of St Quentin), 59th Division was holding the line of the Bullecourt Salient. The German attack followed a hurricane bombardment and was covered by morning mist, and quickly overran the defences of the division's Forward Zone. 2/4th Leicesters had only just come out of the line after 24 hours of continuous trench duty. It was sent straight back up to assist in the defence of Ecoust, but the leading company found that the village had already fallen, and was unable to do more than cover the retreat of the gunners of a field battery which had removed the breechblocks of their guns before being overrun. The battalion could get no further forward than the rear of the Battle Zone. Here the 'line' was no more than a yet-to-be-dug trench marked out with the turf removed and no barbed wire. The men extended along the line but were completely exposed in the open. An officer stood in the Écoust road, stopping stragglers and directing them to join the Leicesters. Under the inspiring leadership of their CO, Lt-Col Sir Iain Colquhoun, 7th Baronet, and Regimental Sergeant-Major 'African Joe' Withers, the battalion held off the Germans for the rest of the day, with modest casualties of 12 killed and 18 wounded.

During the night of 21/22 March, 40th Division took over 59th Division's front, but 177th Bde remained in the line under its command. Over the next few days the composite force was slowly pushed from one fallback position to another, making local counter-attacks, until it was relieved in turn by 42nd (East Lancashire) Division, brought up in buses on 25 March.

What remained of 59th Division was sent north to recuperate, but there the survivors were caught up in the second phase of the Spring Offensive, the Battles of Bailleul (14–15 April) and Kemmel Ridge (17–18 April) forming part of the larger Battles of the Lys. In May 1918 the shattered 59th Division was temporarily disbanded and its battalions reduced to training cadres, the surplus men being drafted to other units.

=== 14th Battalion ===
On 8 May 1918, the cadre of 2/4th Bn was transferred to 47th Bde of 16th Division, (formerly the Irish Division, also smashed up in the Spring Offensive), which went back to England in June. 2/4th Bn was sent to Aldeburgh, where it was merged into the 14th Bn Leicesters, a newly formed service battalion. The 14th Leicesters then moved to Aldershot, where the 16th Division was reforming as an English division. It returned to France on 30 July and 14th Leicesters served with the 16th Division during the final advance of the war.

=== 3/4th Battalion ===
The 3/4th Battalion was formed at Leicester on 12 May 1915 and moved to Belton Park near Grantham and later to Nottingham. It was redesignated the 4th Reserve Bn on 8 April 1916 and on 1 September it absorbed the 5th Reserve (formerly 3/5th) Bn and joined the North Midland Reserve Brigade. It later served at Catterick, North Coates and Louth, where it was disbanded on 17 April 1919.

== Interwar ==
The 4th Leicesters reformed at Leicester on 7 February 1920 in the TF (renamed the Territorial Army (TA) the following year). Once again it formed part of 138th (Lincolnshire & Leicestershire) Bde in 46th (North Midland) Division.

In December 1936, the 46th (North Midland) Division was disbanded and its headquarters was reconstituted as 2nd Anti-Aircraft Division to control the increasing number of anti-aircraft (AA) units being created north of London. At the same time, several of its infantry battalions were converted into searchlight battalions of the Royal Engineers (RE). The 4th Leicesters was one of these, becoming 44th (The Leicestershire Regiment) Anti-Aircraft Battalion, RE (TA), with HQ and 374–377 Anti-Aircraft Companies at Leicester. It formed part of 32nd (Midland) Anti-Aircraft Group in 2nd AA Division (the group was redesignated 32nd AA Brigade in November 1938).

== World War II ==
=== Mobilisation ===
The TA's AA units were mobilised on 23 September 1938 during the Munich Crisis, with units manning their emergency positions within 24 hours, even though many did not yet have their full complement of men or equipment. The emergency lasted three weeks, and they were stood down on 13 October. In February 1939 the existing AA defences came under the control of a new Anti-Aircraft Command. In June a partial mobilisation of TA units was begun in a process known as 'couverture', whereby each AA unit in rotation did a month's tour of duty at selected AA and searchlight positions. On 24 August, ahead of the declaration of war, AA Command was fully mobilised at its war stations.

2nd AA Division's defence responsibilities covered Yorkshire, Humberside and the North Midlands, together with the airfields of No. 12 Group RAF. On mobilisation, Bn HQ with 374 and 377 AA Cos deployed as part of 39 AA Bde, which covered the area between the Humber Estuary and Sheffield.

=== 44th Searchlight Regiment ===
On 1 August 1940, the AA battalions of the RE were transferred to the Royal Artillery (RA), the 44th being designated 44th (The Leicestershire Regiment) Searchlight Regiment, RA. By now, its HQ was at Woodhall Spa in Lincolnshire.

==== Blitz ====
During the Battle of Britain in the summer of 1940, and more especially during the night-bombing Blitz that followed, the units of 32nd AA Bde defended the industrial towns and airfields of the East Midlands. In 1941, the searchlight layout over the Midlands was reorganised, so that any hostile raid approaching the Gun Defended Areas (GDA) around the towns had to cross multiple cross multiple searchlight belts, and then within the GDAs the concentration of lights was increased.

=== 121st Light Anti-Aircraft Regiment ===
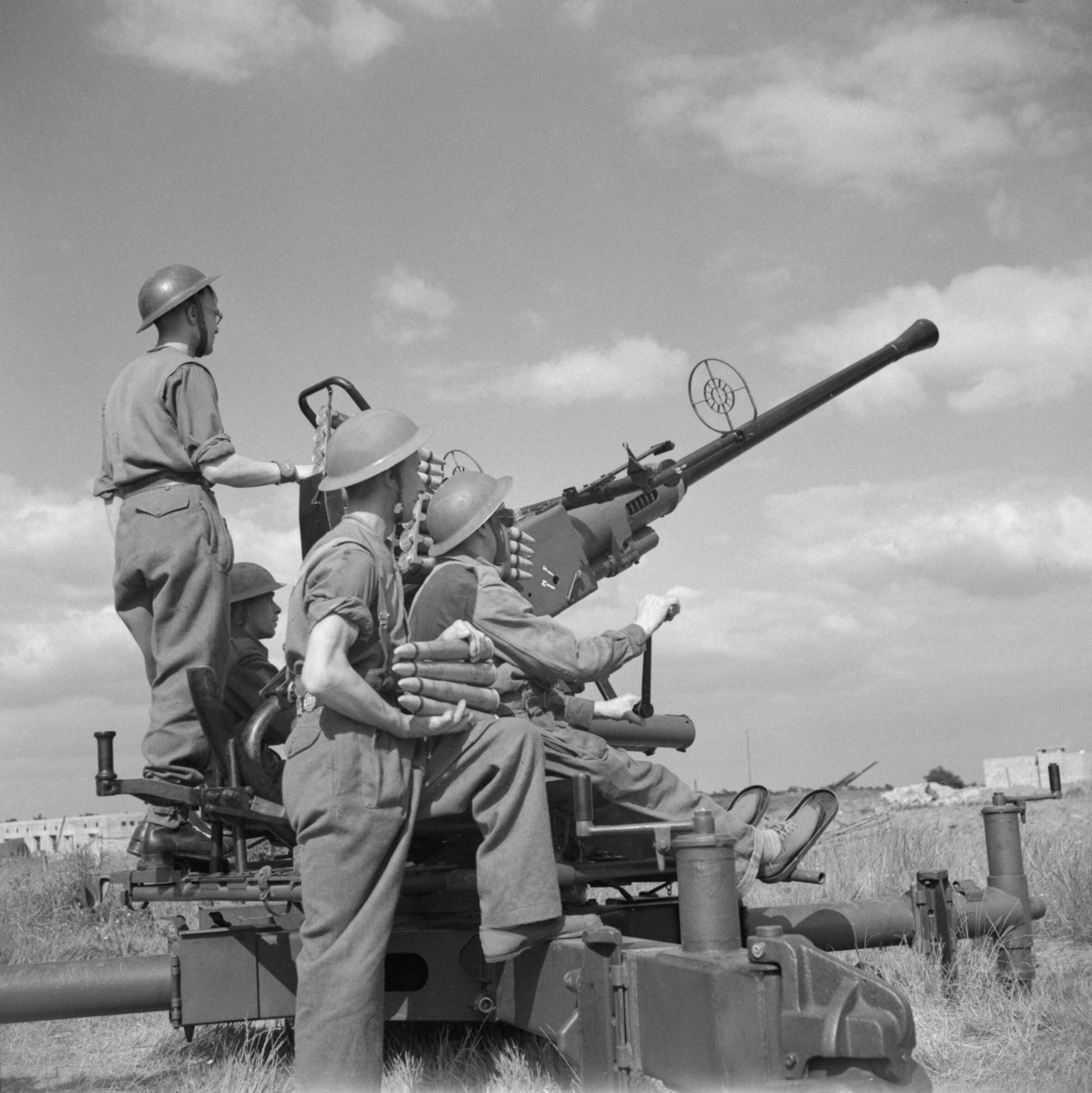
Bofors gun and crew, summer 1944

On 26 January 1942, the regiment changed role again, becoming 121st (The Leicestershire Regiment) Light Anti-Aircraft Regiment, RA (TA), equipped with Bofors 40 mm light anti-aircraft (LAA) guns and organised into four batteries (396–399). It was now in 62 AA Bde in 10th AA Division defending Yorkshire and Humberside. However, it was unbrigaded by March, before rejoining 39 AA Bde in May. On 3 October 1942 398 Bty left to join the newly formed 142nd LAA Rgt at Newton Kyme, near Tadcaster.

In early 1943, the regiment became unbrigaded again, then in May it left AA Command and rejoined 39 AA Bde, which had just been converted into 103 AA Bde to become part of the field force, although loaned to AA Command. The brigade now had responsibility for Great Yarmouth and Lowestoft, and immediately after arrival the regiment was in action against daylight attacks by German Focke-Wulf Fw 190 fighter-bombers, which caused numerous casualties to civilians and AA personnel. The regiment's batteries claimed some 'kills' during these attacks. The brigade remained part of Home Forces until March 1944 when it joined Second Army in preparation for the invasion of Normandy (Operation Overlord).

==== North West Europe ====
The regiment's role in the Overlord plan was to act as a corps LAA regiment under the Corps Commander RA (CCRA) of VIII Corps. VIII Corps was a follow-up formation and first went into action in Operation Epsom on 26 June. For Operation Bluecoat on 30 July, 121st LAA (less one battery) was attached to 8th Army Group Royal Artillery. After the heavy fighting in Normandy, VIII Corps was 'grounded' during the breakout and pursuit, and then had to rush forwards 300 miles to play a supporting role during Operation Market Garden. VIII Corps had the lead in Operation Constellation, the capture of Venray and Blerick on the Maas.

During the fighting in the Klever Reichswald (Operation Veritable) in early 1945, 100th AA Bde was assigned to protect VIII Corps, which had taken Venlo. 121 LAA Regiment reverted to the direct control of the CCRA during the Rhine crossings (Operation Plunder (23–30 March)), when the corps was in Second Army Reserve and 100 AA Bde was protecting the bridgehead.

Once the Allies were across the Rhine, VIII Corps spearheaded Second Army's drive into Germany. Beyond the River Weser, VIII Corps met weaker opposition and pushed rapidly across Luneburg Heath. Its last major task was the crossing of the Elbe, (Operation Enterprise), timed for 29 April, for which it had 100 AA Bde (including two batteries of 121 LAA Regt from the Corps) providing AA cover. This coincided with the last peak of Luftwaffe activity, with 100 AA Bde reporting about 60 attacks by Messerschmitt Bf 109 and Focke-Wulf Fw 190 fighter-bombers against the bridgeheads. With the attackers coming in at heights up to 3000 feet it was mainly an LAA battle: four attackers were shot down. Despite the deterrent effect of the LAA batteries around the bridges, the Luftwaffe did succeed in putting one Class 40 bridge out of action on 1 May; it was repaired the same day. Four days later the German surrender at Lüneburg Heath ended the war in Europe. 121 LAA Regiment was placed in suspended animation on 1 February 1946.

== Postwar ==
=== Artillery ===
When the TA was reconstituted on 1 January 1947, the regiment was reformed at Leicester as 579 (The Royal Leicestershire Regiment) Light Anti-Aircraft Regiment, RA, forming part of 76 AA Bde (the former 50 Light AA Bde) at Leicester. In 1950, the regiment absorbed the Leicester-based 527 LAA/SL Regiment (as R Battery) without change of title. Anti-Aircraft Command was disbanded on 10 March 1955 and there were considerable reductions in the TA's AA units, as a result of which 579 LAA Regiment merged with 262nd (North Midland) Heavy AA Regiment from Derby, and 585th (The Northamptonshire Regiment) LAA/SL Regiment, into a new 438th Light Anti-Aircraft Regiment, RA with the following organisation:

- RHQ at Leicester – ex 579 Rgt
- P (North Midland) Battery – ex 262 Rgt
- Q (Royal Leicestershire Regiment) Battery – ex 579 Rgt
- R (Northamptonshire Regiment) Battery – ex 585 Rgt

=== Infantry ===
In 1961, there were further reorganisations, and 438 Rgt was broken up again. P Battery became 438th (Derbyshire Artillery) Field Squadron in 140 Corps Engineer Regiment, Royal Engineers, and R Battery merged with 5th Bn Northamptons to form 4/5th Bn of that regiment. Similarly, RHQ and Q Battery merged with 5th Bn of the Leicesters to form 4/5th Battalion, Royal Leicestershire Regiment bringing together all of the pre-1908 volunteer units of the regiment and reverting to infantry for the first time since 1936.

When the TA was converted into the Territorial and Army Volunteer Reserve (TAVR) in 1967, 4/5th Battalion provided two elements:

- 4th (Leicestershire) Company, 5th (Volunteer) Battalion, Royal Anglian Regiment in TAVR II (units with a NATO role)
- The Royal Leicestershire Regiment (Territorials) in TAVR III
  - HQ Company at Leicester
  - A Company at Leicester
  - B Company at Loughborough
  - C Company at Hinckley

The Territorial regiment also incorporated 115 (Leicestershire) Corps Field Park Squadron, RE The regiment was reduced to a cadre in 1969 and reconstituted in 1971 as B (Royal Leicestershire) Company, 7th (Volunteer) Battalion, Royal Anglian Regiment.

In 1978, 4th Coy 5th Bn and B Coy 7th Bn were amalgamated to form HQ (The Royal Leicestershire) Company of 7th Bn Royal Anglians (except the Hinckley detachment which became part of 3 (Leicestershire and Derbyshire Yeomanry) Company of 5th Bn). A further reduction in the TA in 1999 saw HQ and C (Northamptonshire Regiment) Companies merged to form C (Leicestershire and Northamptonshire) Company of the East of England Regiment, which was redesignated 3rd Bn Royal Anglian regiment in 2006. Under the 2020 plans for the Army Reserve, C Company at Leicester will absorb B (Lincolnshire) Company by the end of 2016.

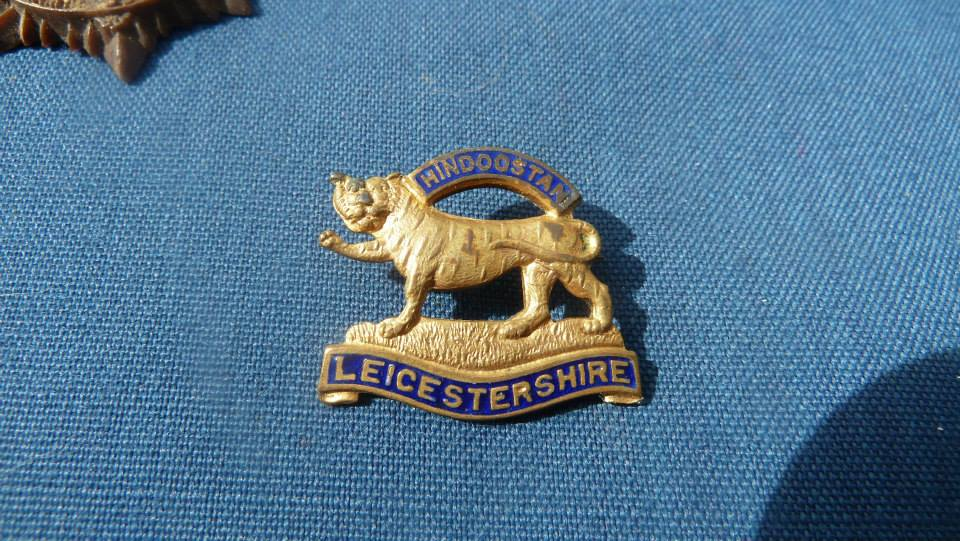
Leicestershire Regiment cap badge

== Insignia ==
After conversion to the RE and then the RA, 44th S/L Rgt continued to wear Leicester Regiment buttons and cap badge bearing the 'Royal Hindoostan Tiger'. After World War II, 579 LAA Rgt wore an embroidered arm badge consisting of the tiger in green on a black rectangle.

== Honorary Colonels ==
The following officers served as Honorary Colonel of the 1st Leicester RVC and its successor units:

- Major-General Edwyn Burnaby, MP, of Baggrave Hall, appointed 23 March 1878 (1st Leicester RVC).
- Henry Manners, 8th Duke of Rutland, KG, TD (styled Marquess of Granby until 1906), appointed 12 October 1897 (1st Volunteer Bn).
- Col J.E. Sarson, CB, OBE, VD, TD, appointed 14 November 1925 (4th Bn).
- Lt-Col Sir Charles Frederick Oliver, TD, appointed 26 July 1937 (4th Bn).
- Col Claude Danolds Oliver, OBE, TD, appointed 1 April 1967 (Royal Leicestershire (T)).
- Lt-Col Gerald Laycock Aspell, TD, DL, appointed 1 April 1972 (Deputy Hon Col, Royal Anglians).
- Lt-Col Michael Moore, MC, TD, appointed 1 April 1979 (Deputy Hon Col, Royal Anglians).
- Col Geoffrey Wilkes, OBE, TD, appointed 29 September 1981 (Deputy Hon Col, Royal Anglians).
- Lr-Col W.G. Dawson, TD (Deputy Hon Col, Royal Anglians).
- Lt-Col J.C.D. Heggs, appointed 1 February 1996 (Deputy Hon Col, Royal Anglians).

== Prominent members ==
- Sir Iain Colquhoun, 7th Baronet, Distinguished Service Order and Bar, from the Scots Guards, was Commanding Officer of 2/4th Battalion in 1918.
- Sir Henry St John Halford, Bt was Commanding Officer of the 1st Administrative Brigade 1862-8 and 1870–91. He shot for England and was captain of the British shooting team that went to America in 1877 and 1882. He was also a member of several War Office small arms committees.
- Henry Rawdon-Hastings, 4th Marquess of Hastings, simultaneously an officer in the Leicestershire Yeomanry, was commissioned as Captain Commandant of the 8th (Ashby-de-la-Zouch) Leicester RVC on 17 March 1863.
- John Manners, Marquess of Granby, later 9th Duke of Rutland, was commissioned into the battalion as a 2nd Lieutenant in 1910. He resigned in July 1914 but withdrew his resignation on the outbreak of war and was promoted to Lieutenant. He was seconded as an aide-de-camp in March 1916 and reached the rank of Captain by the end of the war.

== External sources ==
- British Army units from 1945 on.
- British Military History.
- The Drill Hall Project.
- The Long, Long Trail
- Orders of Battle at Patriot Files.
- Land Forces of Britain, the Empire and Commonwealth – Regiments.org (archive site)
- Army 2020 Reserve Structure and Basing Changes at British Army site
- The Royal Artillery 1939–45
- Graham Watson, The Territorial Army 1947
