= 4th North Midland Brigade, Royal Field Artillery =

British Territorial Army unit

IV North Midland Brigade, RFA 62nd (North Midland) Field Brigade, RA 68th (North Midland) HAA Regiment, RA 262 (North Midland) HAA Regiment, RA 438 (Derbyshire Artillery) Field Squadron, RE
- Cap Badge of the Royal Artillery (pre-1953)
- Active: 1908–1967
- Country: United Kingdom
- Branch: Territorial Army
- Role: Field artillery Anti-aircraft artillery Field engineers
- Part of: 46th (North Midland) Division; 59th (2nd North Midland) Division; Anti-Aircraft Command; Eighth Army
- Garrison/HQ: Derby
- Nickname: 'Derbyshire Howitzers'
- Engagements: First World War: Hooge; Hohenzollern Redoubt; Gommecourt; Messines; 3rd Ypres; German spring offensive; Hundred Days Offensive; Second World War: Siege of Malta; Fall of Tobruk

The 4th North Midland Brigade, sometimes known as the 'Derbyshire Howitzers', was a part-time unit of Britain's Royal Field Artillery created in 1908 as part of the Territorial Force. It served on the Western Front in the First World War. Reorganised between the wars, it was later converted to the anti-aircraft (AA) role. During the Second World War, part of the regiment served in the Siege of Malta but the rest was captured at the Fall of Tobruk. The reconstituted regiment served on in Anti-Aircraft Command until 1955 and as a unit of the Royal Engineers until 1967.

== Origin ==
When the Territorial Force (TF) was created from the former Volunteer Force by the Haldane Reforms in 1908, it was organised into regional infantry divisions, each with a full establishment of Royal Field Artillery (RFA) brigades. Where there were no suitable artillery volunteer units in the region, these brigades had to be created from scratch. This was the case for the North Midland Division, for which a new Howitzer brigade was raised in Derbyshire with the following composition:

IV North Midland (Howitzer) Brigade, RFA

- 1st (Derby and West Hallam) Howitzer Battery
- 2nd (Derby) Howitzer Battery
- IV North Midland (Howitzer) Ammunition Column

The new brigade established its headquarters (HQ) at 91 Siddals Road in Derby, which it shared with C and D Squadrons of the Derbyshire Imperial Yeomanry. The first Commanding Officer (CO), appointed on 1 April was Lieutenant-Colonel Harry Chandos-Pole-Gell of Hopton Hall, previously a Major in the Derbyshire Imperial Yeomanry. Most of the other officers were appointed on 6 August: the Officer Commanding (OC) of 1st Derby Bty was Major Lionel Guy Gisborne of Allestree Hall, who had seen service in the Second Boer War as a captain in the Derbyshire Imperial Yeomanry. Among the officers appointed to 1st Derby Bty were three Derbyshire County Cricket Club players: George Walkden, Guy Wilson and Henry FitzHerbert Wright. Wright, who later became an MP, was commissioned as a captain, the other two as 2nd lieutenants. The OC of 2nd Derby Bty was William Drury Drury-Lowe, a former Captain in the Grenadier Guards.

Lieutenant-Colonel Chandos-Pole-Gell retired in 1913 and was appointed Honorary Colonel of the brigade; Major Gisborne was promoted to succeed him, and was in command on the outbreak of the First World War.

== First World War ==
=== Mobilisation ===
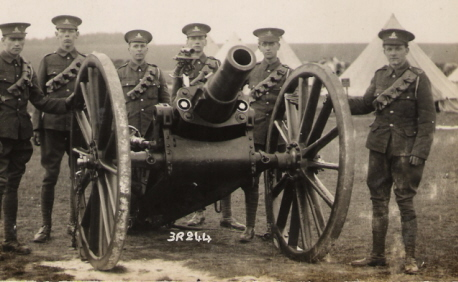
Territorial gunners training with a 5-inch howitzer before the First World War

The order to mobilise was received on 4 August 1914. Shortly afterwards, the men were invited to volunteer for overseas service, and the majority having accepted this liability, the North Midland Division concentrated at Luton. In November, it moved to the area round Bishop's Stortford where it completed its war training. At the time of mobilisation, the two batteries of IV North Midland (H) Bde were each equipped with four BL 5-inch howitzers.

On 15 August 1914, the War Office issued instructions to separate those men who had signed up for Home Service only, and form these into reserve units. On 31 August, the formation of a reserve or 2nd Line unit was authorised for each 1st Line unit where 60 per cent or more of the men had volunteered for Overseas Service. The titles of these 2nd Line units would be the same as the original, but distinguished by a '2/' prefix. In this way, duplicate battalions, brigades and divisions were created, mirroring those TF formations being sent overseas. The floods of recruits coming forward were enrolled in these 2nd Line units. Lieutenant-Colonel Chandos-Pole-Gell was brought out of retirement to command the 2/1st Staffordshire Infantry Brigade during its first weeks of training.

=== 1/IV North Midland Brigade ===
The North Midland Division began embarking for France on 25 February 1915, and by 8 March had completed its concentration at Ploegsteert in Belgium – the first complete TF division to deploy to the Western Front with the British Expeditionary Force (BEF). It was numbered the 46th (North Midland) Division shortly afterwards.

==== Hooge ====
Over the following months, the artillery supported the infantry in routine trench warfare in the Ypres Salient. On 19 July, the Royal Engineers exploded a mine under the German positions at Hooge, but the infantry of 3rd Division tasked with seizing the crater had not been given a supporting artillery fireplan. As the infantry were being driven out by German artillery, counter-battery fire from 46th Division's guns and other neighbouring artillery helped to rectify the situation. When the Germans attacked the Hooge crater with flamethrowers on 30 July, 139th (Sherwood Foresters) Brigade of 46th Division was able to stabilise the line with the help of the divisional artillery.

==== Hohenzollern Redoubt ====
46th Division's first offensive operation was the Battle of the Hohenzollern Redoubt. This was an attempt to restart the failed Battle of Loos, and the division was moved down from Ypres on 1 October for the purpose. The Germans recaptured the Hohenzollern trench system on 3 October, and the new attack was aimed at this point. The artillery bombardment (by the field guns of 46th and 28th Division, backed by heavy batteries) began at 12.00 on 13 October and the infantry went in at 14.00 behind a gas cloud. The attack was a disaster, most of the leading waves being cut down by machine gun and shell fire from German positions that had not been suppressed by the bombardment.

On 23 December, the 46th (NM) Division was ordered to embark for Egypt. It entrained for Marseille, and some of the infantry had actually reached Egypt before the order was rescinded on 21 January 1916. The artillery returned from Marseille and the whole division reassembled on the Western Front near Amiens by 14 February.

==== Reorganisation ====
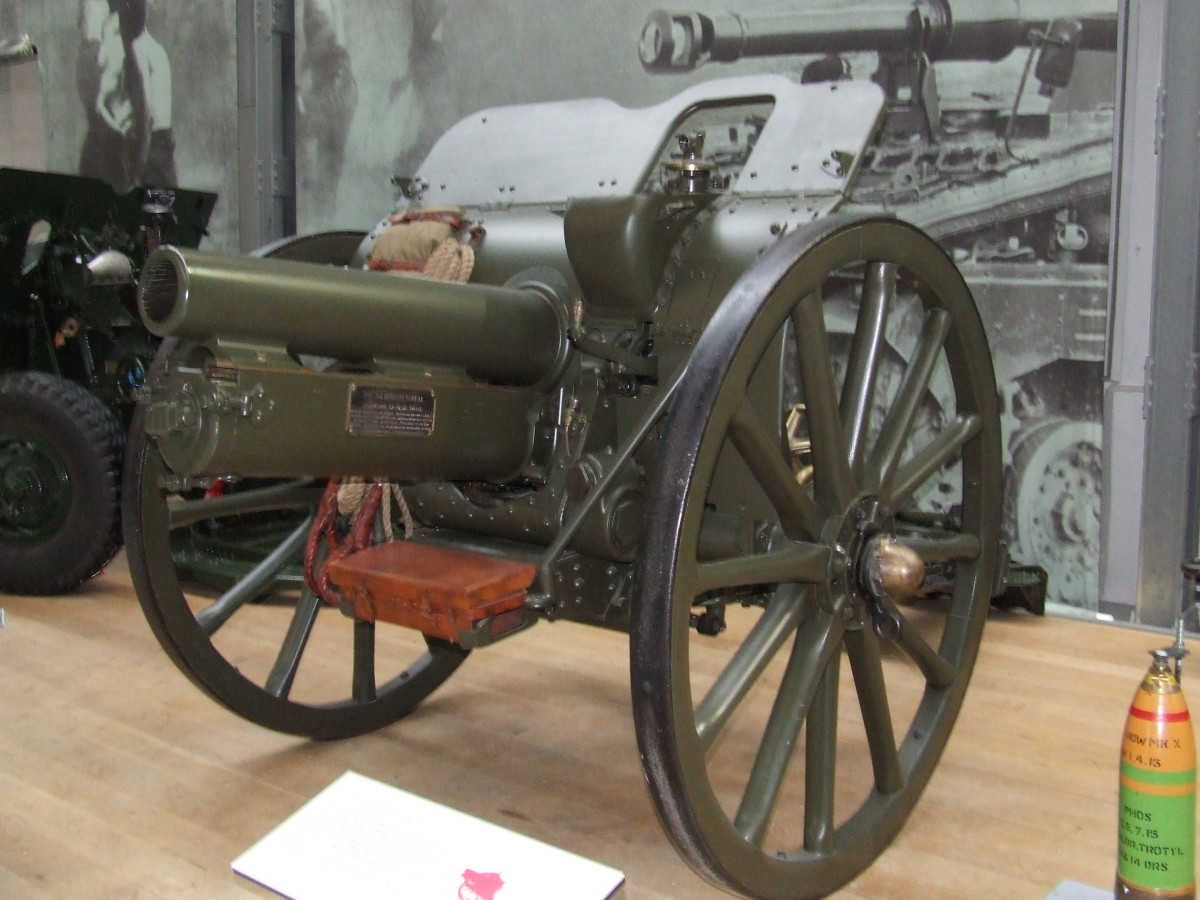
4.5-inch howitzer preserved at the Royal Artillery Museum.

1/IV (NM) Brigade rearmed with 4.5-inch howitzers on 16 December 1915. A (H) Battery from CLIV (Empire) Howitzer Bde, a Kitchener's Army unit recruited from Croydon, joined the brigade from 36th (Ulster) Division on 28 February 1916, and was designated R (H) Bty on 8 March. On 1 May, the division was ordered into the line facing Gommecourt in preparation for the forthcoming Somme Offensive. Over the first 10 days of the month, the divisional artillery took over the existing battery positions along this front and began digging additional gun pits, observation posts (OPs) and dugouts to new designs.

While preparing for the offensive, the divisional artillery were subjected to a thorough reorganisation that was affecting all the field artillery in the BEF. First the TF brigades were assigned numbers, 1/IV North Midland becoming CCXXXIII (233), and the 1st and 2nd Derby Howitzer Btys becoming A (H) and B (H) Btys on 13 May. The other three North Midland brigades, now numbered CCXXX, CCXXXI and CCXXXII (230–2), each formed an additional D battery. On 23 May, CCXXXIII (H) Bde transferred A (H), R (H) and B (H) Btys to the other three brigades, and in exchange received each of the other brigades' D Btys equipped with 18-pounder field guns. As a result, CCXXX, CCXXXI, and CCXXXII brigades now had three 18-pounder batteries and one 4.5-inch howitzer battery, but CCXXXIII (despite being the original howitzer brigade) had three newly formed 18-pounder batteries (A from Lincolnshire, B and C from Staffordshire) but no howitzers. In addition, the brigade ammunition columns (BACs) were abolished and merged into 46th Divisional Ammunition Column (DAC).

In June, Lt-Col Gisborne was awarded a CB and Major (acting Lt-Col) Drury-Lowe, commanding 2nd Derby Bty, received a DSO, but in July Drury-Lowe returned to the Grenadier Guards and reverted to his former rank of captain. He was killed in action in September 1916.

==== Gommecourt ====
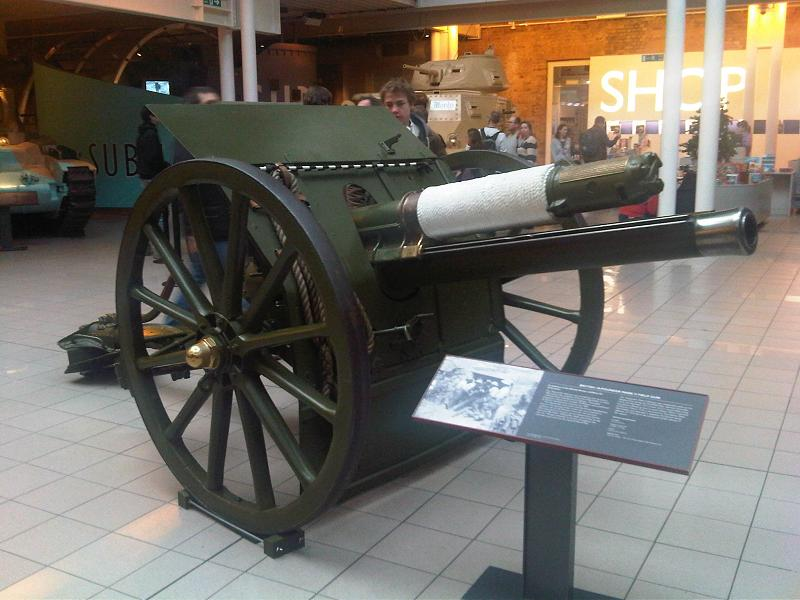
18-pounder preserved at the Imperial War Museum.

Preparations were under way for the 46th and 56th (1st London) Divisions to carry out an Attack on the Gommecourt Salient as a diversion from the main offensive further south. 46th Division would attack from the north west, converging with 56th from the south west. On 18 June, 46th Divisional artillery was allocated its tasks for wire-cutting and registration of targets ahead of the attack. It was divided into two groups: CCXXXIII Bde was grouped with CCXXX Bde on the right under the latter's CO, while Lt-Col Gisborne was Right Group's liaison officer at 137th (Staffordshire) Brigade, which was to make the division's right attack towards Gommecourt Wood. Right Group had its batteries dug in west and south west of Gommecourt with a concentration of three batteries around Chateau de la Haye and three others scattered around Sailly-au-Bois and Foncquevillers intermixed with 56th Division's batteries. C/CCXXXIII Battery at the end was lined up with Left Group's guns just west of Foncquevillers. Right Group's responsibility was the German line from the westernmost tip of Gommecourt Park to a point just north of the Gommecourt–Foncquevillers road.

46th Division used a high proportion of its 18-pounder ammunition to bombard enemy trenches and lines of communication, and a smaller proportion (about 27 per cent) of shrapnel shells to cut German barbed wire. However, on the right of the attack, the ground sloped away from the trajectory of the guns, making it difficult to judge Fuze-settings for wire-cutting. A/CCXXXIII and C/CCXXXIII batteries were assigned to wire-cutting on 137th Bde's front.

Apart from the wire-cutting batteries, the divisional artillery was under the direction of VII Corps during the preliminary bombardment, which began on 24 June, but at zero hour it reverted to divisional control. Once the infantry went 'over the top' the field guns were to make a series of short 'lifts', almost amounting to a 'creeping barrage'.

A final 'whirlwind' bombardment by all the guns began at 06.25 on 1 July and at zero hour (07.30) 137th Brigade made its attack with 1/6th Battalion South Staffordshire Regiment and 1/6th Bn North Staffordshire Regiment in the lead. Patrols had already established that the German wire was not adequately cut: there were four partially cut lanes on the South Staffs' front and five areas of weakened wire in front of the North Staffs. In addition, German casualties during the bombardment had been few because of their deep dugouts, and when the attack went in their men emerged to receive the attack with heavy machine-gun and rifle fire from their trenches and from Gommecourt Wood. Held up by uncut wire in dead ground and by enemy fire, the brigade's leading two waves only reached the German first line and were forced to take cover in shell holes where they exchanged Grenade attacks with the Germans. The third wave was stopped by machine gun fire 100 yards (91 m) short of the first line. The British infantry were unable to keep up with the covering barrage of the 18-pounders, which was lifted onto each enemy trench line to a strict timetable: artillery observation during the attack was difficult due to the smoke and confusion. Meanwhile, the supporting waves were held up in the jumping-off trenches or in No man's land by enemy shellfire. The whole attack had halted in bloody failure by 08.00.

Lieutenant-Colonel Gisborne and the commander of 137th Bde attempted to bring the barrage back so that a second attack could be launched by the supporting battalions (1/5th South Staffs and 1/5th North Staffs). At about 08.45 VII Corps ordered a renewed bombardment on Gommecourt Wood in which A and B/CCXXXIII Btys participated. But the support units were already inextricably held up by mud and shellfire in their own trenches and the attack was postponed several times. It was not until 15.30 that 137th Bde was ready to attack again. However, the neighbouring brigade never began the advance, and 137th Bde's officers called off the attack at the last minute.

==== Disbandment ====
The Gommecourt attack was a diversion, and it was not renewed after the first day's disaster. 46th Division remained in position while the Somme offensive continued further south throughout the summer and autumn. There was further reorganisation amongst divisional artillery, resulting in CCXXXIII Brigade being broken up on 29 August 1916 and distributed by sections so that the rest of the divisional artillery had 6-gun batteries. The two original Derbyshire Howitzer batteries, much reorganised, continued to serve as (D (H)/CCXXX Bty in 46th Divisional Artillery and D (H)/CCXXXII Bty in an Army Field Brigade) until the Armistice.

=== 2/IV North Midland Brigade ===
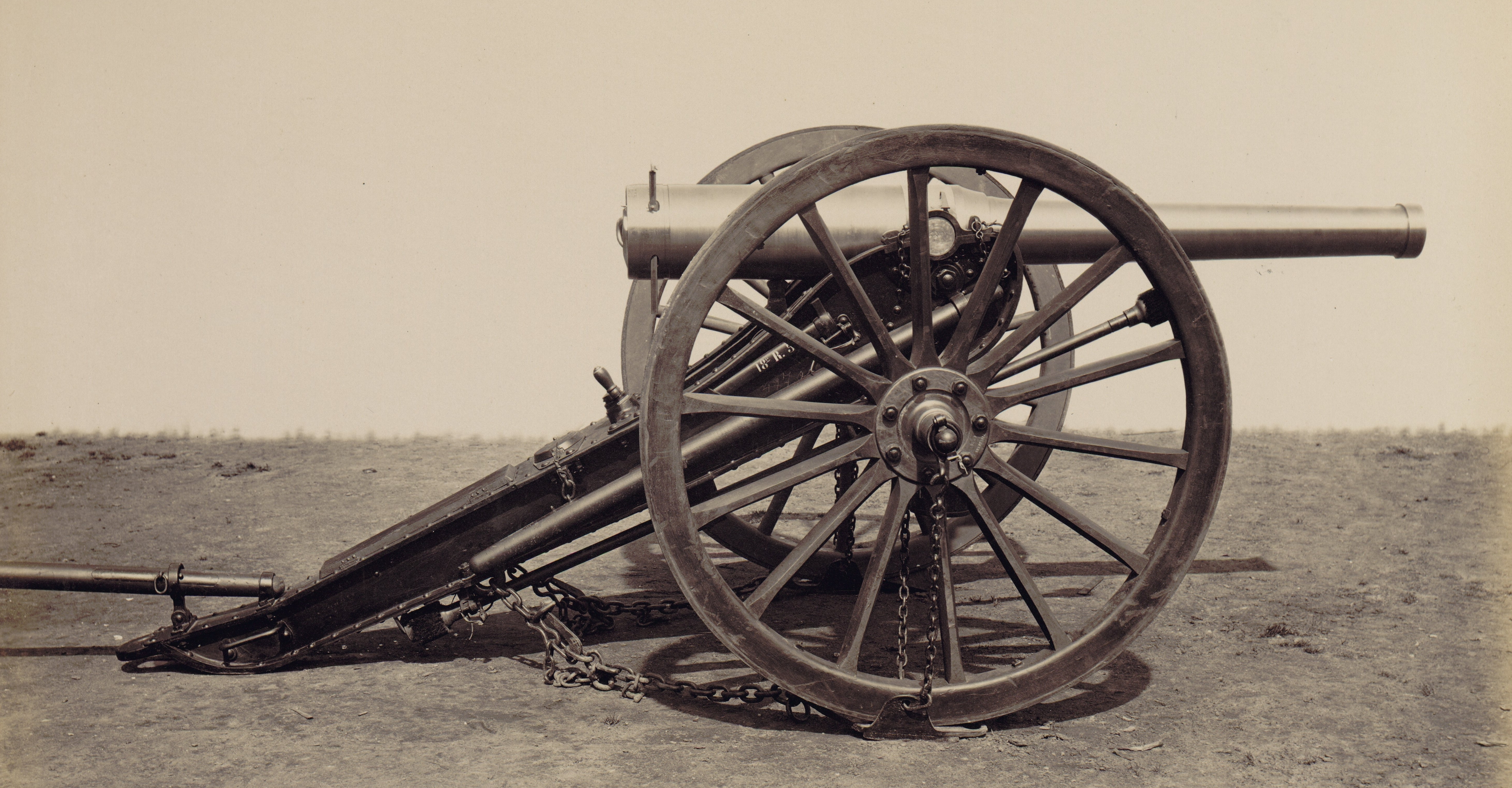
De Bange 90 mm cannon issued to 2nd Line TF units.

Meanwhile, the men who had not volunteered for foreign service, together with the recruits who were coming forward, remained to form the 2/I North Midland Brigade, RFA, in the 2nd North Midland Division (59th (2nd North Midland) Division from August 1915), which concentrated round Luton in January 1915. At first the 2nd Line recruits had to parade in civilian clothes and train with 'Quaker' guns – logs of wood mounted on cart wheels – but these shortages were slowly made up. Uniforms arrived in November 1914, but it was not until March 1915 that a few 90 mm French guns arrived for training. The division took over the requisitioned transport and second-hand horse harness when 46th Division was re-equipped and left for France. The divisional artillery were joined at Luton by the 1st Line 4th Home Counties (Howitzer) Brigade, RFA, and Wessex Heavy Bty, RGA, which were fully equipped and could lend guns for training. Later, the brigade took over some 5-inch howitzers. In July the division moved out of overcrowded Luton, the artillery moving to Hemel Hempstead, where they spent the winter of 1915–16. In early 1916 the batteries were finally brought up to establishment in horses, and 4.5-inch howitzers replaced the 5-inch howitzers.

==== Ireland ====
In April 1916, the 59th Division was the mobile division of Central Force in England, and it was ordered to Ireland when the Easter Rising occurred, the divisional artillery landing at Kingstown on 28 April. The artillery moved up to Ballsbridge to support the infantry but was not engaged, and once the trouble in Dublin had been suppressed, the troops moved out to The Curragh to continue training. As was the case with the RFA units in the BEF, the brigade went through major reorganisation at this time. On 29 April 1916, the batteries were designated A (H) and B (H), and later the brigade was numbered CCXCVIII (298). At the end of May the brigade was joined by 3 (H) Bty from LIX Bde, a Kitchener's Army unit with 11th (Northern) Division, which became C (H) Bty. On 10 July, all three batteries were exchanged for 2/1st Hampshire Royal Horse Artillery (RHA), 2/1st Essex RHA, and 2/1st Glamorganshire RHA, which had recently joined the other three RFA brigades of 59th Division (CCXCV, CCXCVI and CCXCVII Bdes respectively). These RHA batteries were each equipped with four 18-pounder field guns rather than horse artillery guns, and the brigade lost its Howitzer designation. In July, the BAC was merged into the 59th DAC.

==== Western Front ====
In January 1917, the 59th Division was relieved in Ireland and returned to the UK, concentrating at the Fovant training area on the edge of Salisbury Plain preparatory to embarking for France. Before leaving Ireland, 2/1st Glamorgan RHA was split between the other two batteries to bring them up to six guns each. A new C (H) Bty was formed, but quickly broken up, to be replaced by D (H)/CCXCVII (the former 3 (H)/LIX). 59th Division began crossing to France on 17 February 1917 and concentrated around Méricourt. The last unit battery of CCXCVIII Bde arrived at Le Havre on 17 March, the day the Germans began their retreat to the Hindenburg Line (Operation Alberich). The brigade immediately took part in following this retreat in March and April.

On 4 April 1917, CCXCVIII Bde left 59th Division to become an Army Field Brigade. At the same time, C (H) Bty was transferred away to Fourth Army, to be replaced on 12 April by A/CCCXXXII Bty (originally 2/18th Lancashire Bty) from 66th (2nd East Lancashire) Division. Finally, D (H) Bty joined from Fourth Army Artillery on 1 August 1917 to complete the brigade to the organisation it kept for the remainder of the war:

- A (2/1 Hampshire) Bty
- B (2/1 Essex) Bty
- C (2/18 Lancashire) Bty
- D (H) Bty

==== Messines ====
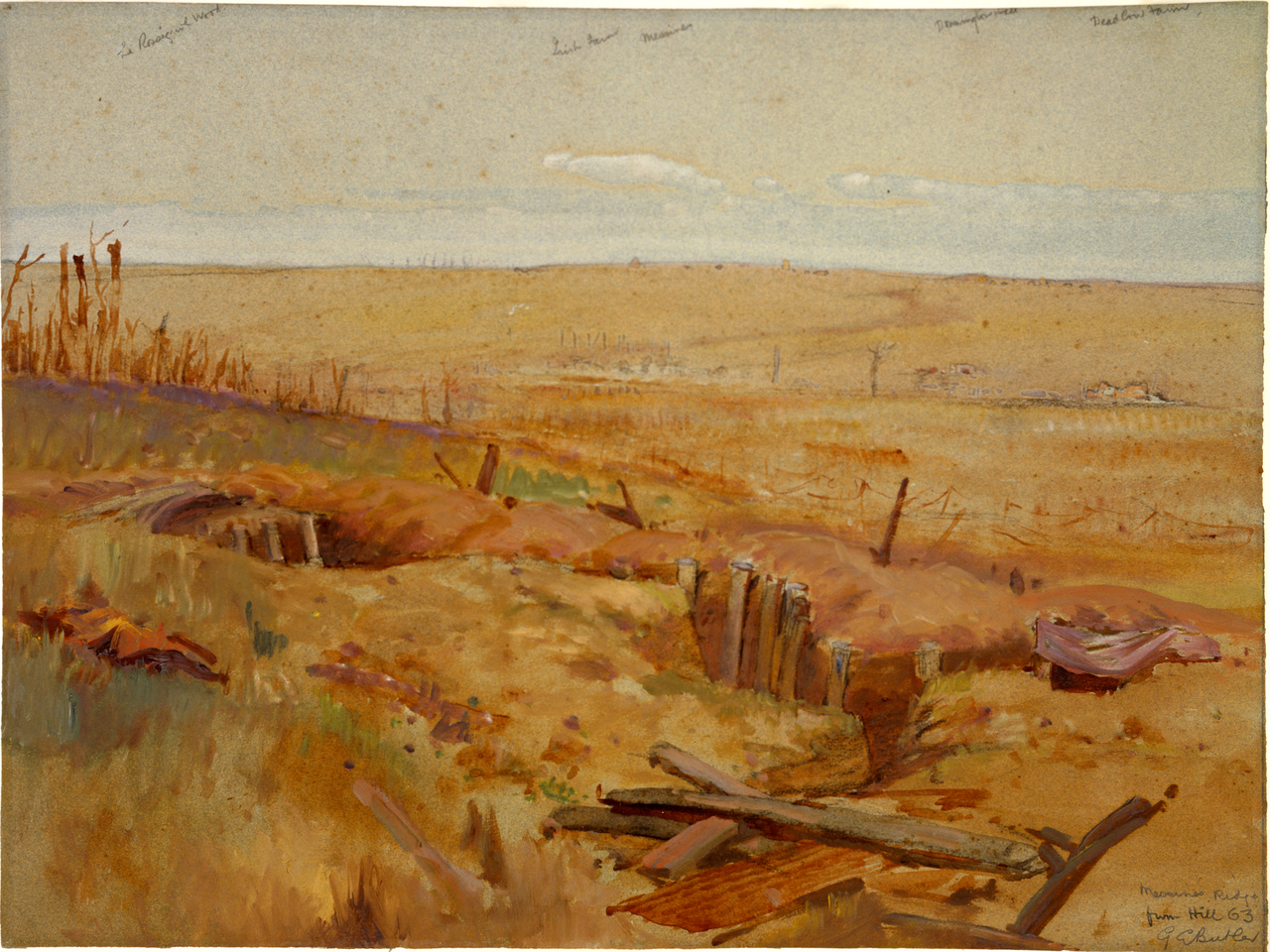
Messines Ridge from Hill 63 by George Edmund Butler.

The role of an Army Field Artillery (AFA) brigade was to reinforce sectors of the front as required, without breaking up divisional artilleries. After a period of rest, CCXCVIII Bde joined VIII Corps in a quiet area on 21 April before moving to 23rd Division in X Corps on 24 May as it was preparing for the Battle of Messines. The AFA brigades were moved into the area in secrecy, a battery at a time. Ammunition dumps had been formed containing 1000 rounds for each 18-pounder and 750 for each 4.5-inch howitzer, together with thousands of rounds of gas and smoke shells. The preparatory bombardment began on 26 May and the creeping barrage was practised on 3 and 5 June, inducing the Germans to reveal many of their own batteries, which were then bombarded. The guns ceased fire at 02.40 on 7 June and then the attack was launched at 03.10 with the firing of a series of massive mines under the Messines Ridge. The infantry advanced behind a creeping barrage (about two-thirds of the 18-pounders) protected by a standing barrage (the 4.5-inch howitzers and remaining 18-pounders) 700 yards (640 m) in front. Once the infantry reached their objectives, the creeping barrage became a protective barrage 150–300 yards ahead of them while they consolidated their positions. The plan worked to perfection, and there was scarcely any opposition to the initial attack from the stunned defenders. Some field batteries then moved forward into the old no-man's land to extend the protective barrage. This smashed the first German counter-attack launched at 14.00, and the British second phase attack was launched in the afternoon, taking its objectives.

==== Third Ypres ====
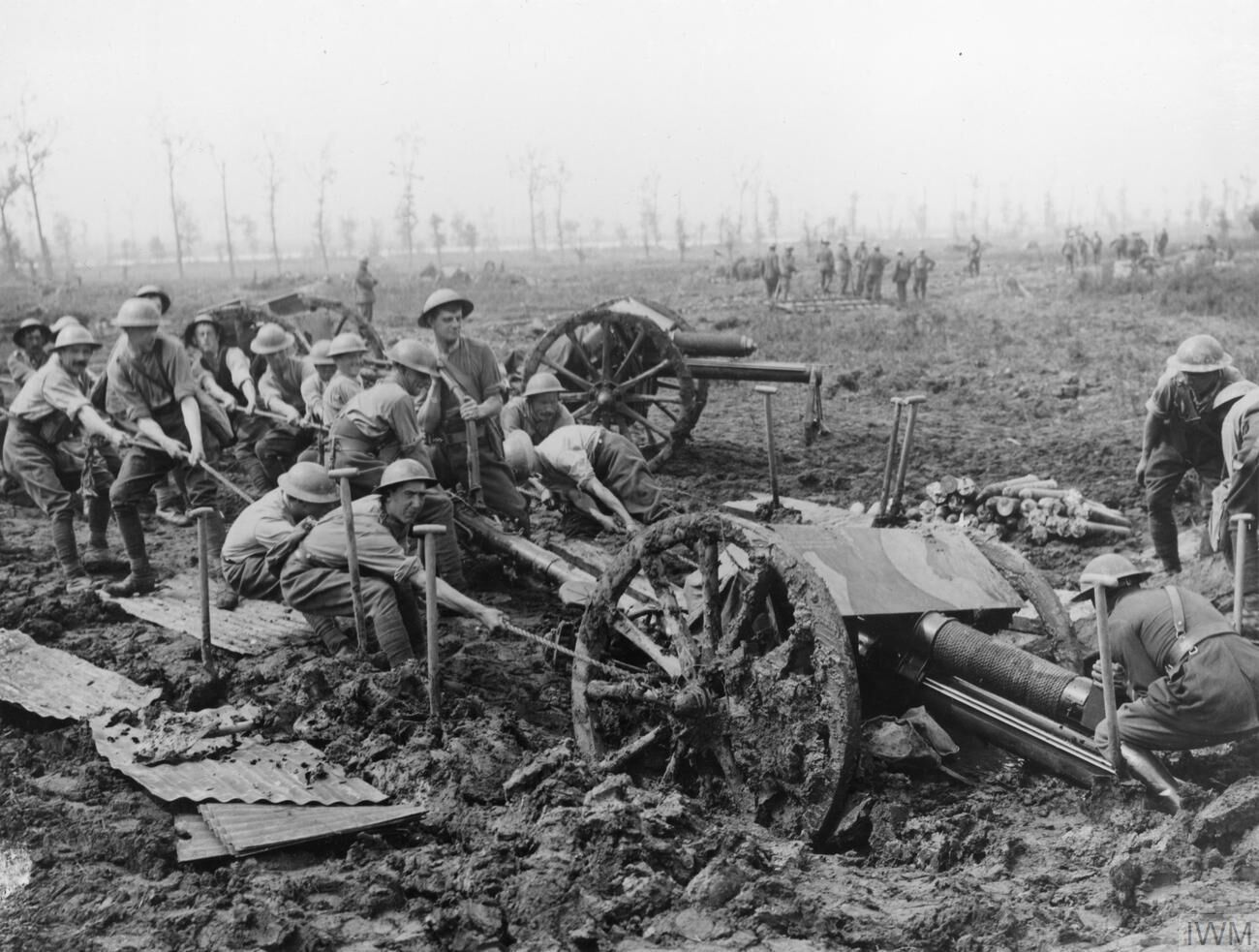
18-pounder in mud during the Third Ypres offensive, 1917

The brigade continued supporting 23rd and 24th Divisions in X Corps until 4 July when Fifth Army's II Corps took over that sector of the front. It supported 24th Division during the early phases of the Third Ypres Offensive, which opened with the Battle of Pilckem Ridge on 31 July. Once again the field guns supplied the creeping barrage and standing barrage. Attacking towards 'Shrewsbury Forest', 24th Division got held up and left behind as the barrage advanced to timetable. The rest of the attack was a partial success, but II Corps' failure led to the development of a dangerous salient. Casualties among the gunners rose over the following days as they struggled amongst the mud to bombard the German line for a second attack (the Battle of Langemarck, 16–18 August).

24th Division and CCXCVIII AFA Bde reverted to X Corps in Second Army on 28 August, and the gunners were rested from 8 to 17 September. The brigade was assigned to XVIII Corps in Fifth Army for the Battle of the Menin Road Ridge (20–25 September) in which it supported 58th (2/1st London) Division. New artillery tactics involved five belts of fire, the first two fired by 18-pounders, the third by 4.5-inch howitzers, moving at a slow pace with frequent pauses to allow the infantry to keep up. Batteries also had the task of swinging off to engage targets of opportunity, and had spare detachments to avoid exhaustion of the gunners. The barrage was described as 'magnificent both in accuracy and volume', German counterattacks were broken up by shellfire, and the attack was a resounding success.

CCXCVIII AFA Brigade supported XVIII Corps' divisions through the following phases of the offensive, the battles of Polygon Wood (26 September–3 October), Broodseinde (4 October), Poelcappelle (9 October), 1st Passchendaele (12 October) and 2nd Passchendaele (26 October), where the conditions became increasingly impossible and the quality of artillery support diminished. The brigade was withdrawn for rest on 28 October before the fighting was over.

==== Spring Offensive ====
In November, the brigade reverted to II Corps, and then moved in December to V Corps, where it supported 63rd (Royal Naval) Division from 21 December to 11 January 1918, including the action at Welch Ridge (30–31 December). It next joined III Corps, but was rested until 28 February when it was assigned to 14th (Light) Division. This formation was thinly spread along a stretch of line recently taken over from the French army, and quickly crumbled when it was attacked on the first day of the German spring offensive (21 March 1918). The divisional field artillery lost all their guns but the divisional artillery commander kept a composite force, including CCXCVIII AFA Bde and various heavy artillery batteries, in action until 29 March supporting 'Reynolds's Force' even after 14th Division had been withdrawn.

==== Hundred Days Offensive ====
After the 'Great Retreat' of March 1918, CCXCVIII AFA Bde spent 31 March to 9 April 1918 refitting, before returning to the line with 58th Division in time for the fighting round Villers-Bretonneux. During this battle the brigade transferred to the neighbouring 5th Australian Division, and went with that formation to the Australian Corps. It remained with the Australians in Fourth Army throughout the summer of 1918, supporting different Australian divisions or acting as mobile Corps reserve during the Battle of Amiens (8 August) and the Second Battle of the Somme (21 August–2 September). The keynote of these attacks was thorough preparation and execution of the artillery fireplan, and then rapid movement of the field batteries behind the advancing infantry.

On 13 September 1918, the brigade transferred to IX Corps, which had been reconstituted in Fourth Army to take a leading role in the continuing Hundred Days Offensive. IX Corps assigned it to 1st Division for the Battle of Épehy (18 September), the attack on The Quadrilateral and Fresnoy (24 September), the Battle of St Quentin Canal (29 September–2 October) and the Battle of the Beaurevoir Line (3–5 October). It was rested for a while, then went back into the line supporting 1st and 32nd Divisions in the Battle of the Selle (16–20 October). After another short rest, it caught up with 46th (North Midland) Division in time for the Battle of the Sambre (4–8 November), when the division advanced on 7 November to seize the Avesnes road. As 138th (Lincoln & Leicester) Bde advanced up the road, CCXXXI (2nd North Midland) and then CCXCVIII AFA Bdes put down concentrations of fire on the main points of resistance and the Germans began to withdraw.

Most of IX Corps, including CCXCVIII AFA Bde, halted for rest on 9 November having advanced more than 50 miles since it came into the line in September. It was still resting when the Armistice with Germany came into effect on 11 November.

== Interwar ==
When the TF was reformed in 1920, RFA brigades standardised on an establishment of three field and one howitzer battery: 3rd and 4th North Midland Bdes were combined into a single unit consisting of the two Derbyshire batteries from the 4th and the 5th and 6th Staffordshire Batteries from the 3rd. Although the unit was briefly referred to as the 3rd North Midland Bde, its HQ was at Siddal's Road, Derby, and continued the lineage of the old 4th; it remained part of 46th (North Midland) Division. When the TF was reorganised as the Territorial Army (TA) in 1921, the brigade was redesignated as 62nd (North Midland) Brigade with the following organisation:

- 245 (Derby) Bty
- 246 (Derby) Bty (Howitzers)
- 247 (Wolverhampton) Bty
- 248 (West Bromwich) Bty

In 1924, the RFA was subsumed into the Royal Artillery (RA) and its brigades were redesignated 'Field Brigades'.

TA units each had a Regular Army adjutant; 62nd (NM) Fd Bde's adjutant during the early 1930s was Brevet Major William Revell-Smith, MC, who went on to become Major General, AA, in 21st Army Group during the Second World War.

=== Anti-aircraft conversion ===
During the 1930s, the increasing need for anti-aircraft (AA) defence for Britain's cities was addressed by converting a number of TA units and formations to the AA role. 46th (North Midland) Division became 2nd AA Division in 1936 and many of its infantry battalions and artillery brigades were subsequently converted to AA gun or searchlight roles. 62nd Field Brigade was converted on 10 December 1936: Regimental HQ (RHQ) and the two Derby batteries reorganised as 68th (North Midland) AA Regiment (the RA adopted the designation 'regiment' instead of 'brigade' for a lieutenant-colonel's command on 1 January 1939) while the two Staffordshire batteries left to form the basis of 73rd AA Regiment at Wolverhampton. The new regiment had the following organisation:

68th (North Midland) AA Regiment

- RHQ at Siddall's Road, Derby
- 200 (Derby) AA Bty at Derby
- 222 (Derby) AA Bty at Derby
- 270 (Wentworth) AA Bty at Rotherham, formed 1 November 1938

However, this organisation was short-lived: on 7 March 1939, 270 Bty left to be part of a new 92nd AA Regiment forming at Pontefract and Rotherham, but this regiment was never completed and instead the Bty joined 91st AA Rgt. Meanwhile, 68th (NM) AA Rgt was completed by two new batteries, 276 and 277, raised in Nottingham on 1 April 1939.

The regiment formed part of 32nd (Midland) Anti-Aircraft Brigade based in Derby, which came under the command of 2nd AA Division.

== Second World War ==
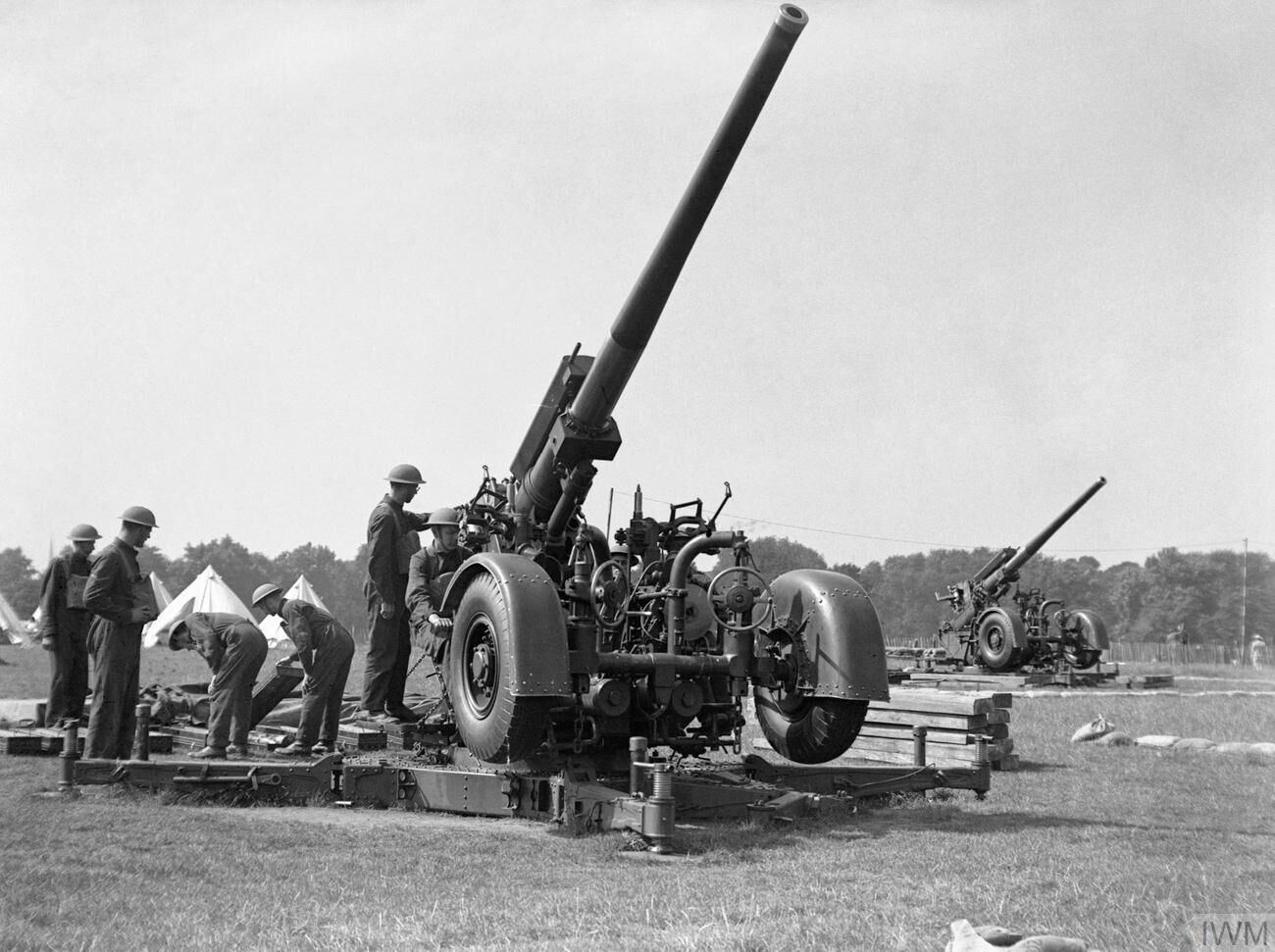
Mobile 3.7-inch gun in 1939.

=== Mobilisation ===
The TA's AA units were mobilised on 23 September 1938 during the Munich Crisis, with units manning their emergency positions within 24 hours, even though many did not yet have their full complement of men or equipment. The emergency lasted three weeks, and they were stood down on 13 October. In February 1939, the existing AA defences came under the control of a new Anti-Aircraft Command. In June a partial mobilisation of TA units was begun in a process known as 'couverture', whereby each AA unit did a month's tour of duty in rotation to man selected AA and searchlight positions. On 24 August, ahead of the declaration of war, AA Command was fully mobilised at its war stations. 200 (Derby) AA Battery joined 69th (Royal Warwickshire Regiment) AA Rgt soon after the outbreak of war.

=== Battle of Britain ===
At the time of mobilisation, 2 AA Division only had six heavy AA guns ready for action at Derby and another six at Nottingham, but, by 11 July 1940, at the start of the Battle of Britain, this had risen to 40 at Derby and 16 at Nottingham. A new 50 Light AA Bde had taken over responsibility for these two Gun Defended Areas (GDAs) and 68th AA Rgt had been joined by detachments from 78th AA Rgt to man some of the guns.

At the same time, at the height of invasion fears after the Dunkirk evacuation, AA Brigades were required to form mobile columns available to combat enemy paratroopers. 50th LAA Bde's column called 'Macduff' consisted of one battery from 68th AA Rgt and one searchlight company to operate directly under 2 AA Division. In addition, Brigade HQ ordered all AA units to cooperate with field forces or the Local Defence Volunteers (LDVs, later called the Home Guard) by providing fighting patrols and guards when they could not perform their primary AA role. 68th AA Regiment was provided with 60 riflemen from training regiments to supplement its own spare men for these fighting patrols, who were instructed to 'meet guile with guile' to 'ruthlessly hunt down' highly trained German paratroopers. In the event there were no landings and the patrols were soon stood down.

On 1 June 1940, along with other AA units equipped with 3-inch, 3.7-inch or larger guns, the 68th was designated a Heavy AA (HAA) Regiment, to distinguish it from the new Light AA (LAA) units being formed.

The Midlands were barely affected during the Battle of Britain, though the Derby Barrage fired for the first time on 19 August 1940, and a series of night raids on Liverpool late in the month passed overhead.

68th HAA Regiment did not remain in its home area during the night-bombing Blitz that followed the Luftwaffe's defeat in the Battle of Britain. It had been rostered for overseas service and left AA Command. As the war establishment for HAA regiments overseas was three batteries, 222 HAA Bty was detached and sent on as an independent battery to Malta, while the rest of the regiment went to Egypt soon afterwards. In December, the newly formed 113th HAA Rgt arrived to take over the Nottingham guns.

=== Siege of Malta ===
Malta had been under air attack since the day Italy entered the war (11 June 1940) and urgently needed AA reinforcements. As part of Operation Coat a convoy sailed from Liverpool on 30 October carrying two independent HAA batteries: 222 and 191 (which had similarly been detached from 69th (Warwickshire) HAA Rgt), one LAA battery (59 from 19th LAA Rgt), and spare AA guns and gun barrels. At Gibraltar, the convoy collected RHQ of 10th HAA Rgt, which had been formed in that garrison in December 1939. The convoy sailed on from Gibraltar on 7 November and the troops disembarked in Malta on 10 November and joined the garrison. 10th HAA Regiment took over command of 199 and 222 HAA Btys. The rest of 69th HAA Rgt mobilised for overseas service in November, but the order was rescinded, and only 190 HAA Bty sailed, reaching Malta in January and joining 10th HAA Rgt.

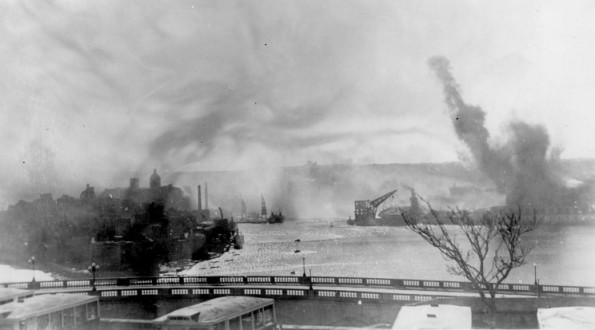
HMS Illustrious (right of crane) under attack.

By January 1941, theLuftwaffe had joined the Regia Aeronautica in attacks on Malta. On 11 January the damaged aircraft carrier HMS Illustrious came into Grand Harbour for repairs. The Luftwaffe laid on a major air raid (possibly 50 Junkers Ju 88 and 20 Junkers Ju 87 Stuka 's) on 16 January to finish off the carrier, but the AA guns on the island had been re-sited to defend the ship alongside Parlotorio Wharf with a 'box' barrage, and the raiders suffered heavily. A second raid made two days later was also disrupted by the defences. Only one bomb hit the ship, but the adjacent towns were badly hit, and nearby ships and AA positions suffered casualties. On 19 January, the Luftwaffe tried again, with a diversionary raid on Luqa airfield, but Illustrious made her way to Alexandria under her own steam on 23 January.

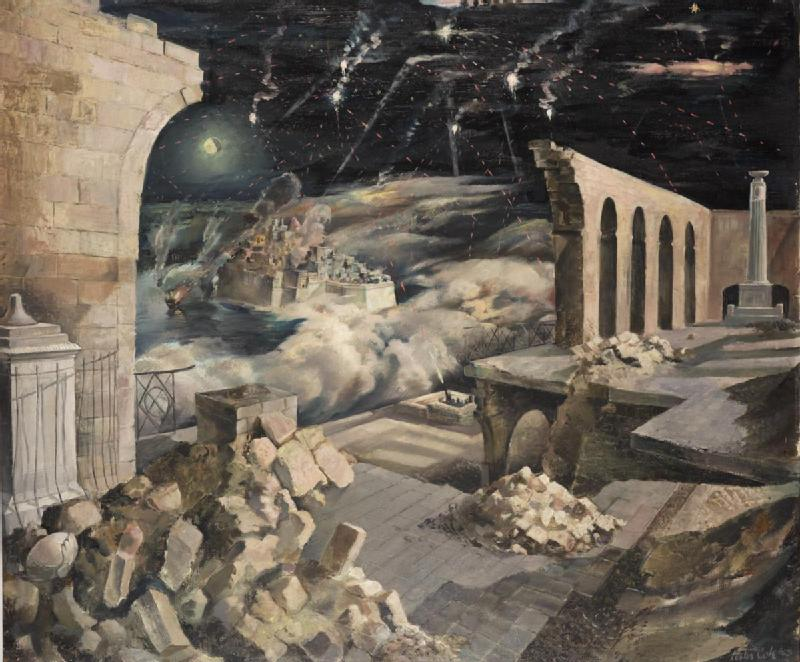
Malta – the Harbour Barrage from the Upper Barracca, by Leslie Cole; depicting an AA gun (in the centre of the composition) firing during a night air raid.

In February, the Luftwaffe 's Fliegerkorps X was ordered to neutralise Malta, and it began a series of heavy bombing raids, mainly at night, accompanied by mine-dropping in and around the harbour, and daylight sweeps by Messerschmitt Bf 109 single-engined fighters. In March, there was dive-bombing against the RAF airfields, and attacks on a supply convoy on 23 March. The HAA guns were engaged almost every day, taking a steady toll of the bombers. By the beginning of June, the depleted Fliegerkorps X handed responsibility back to the Italians.

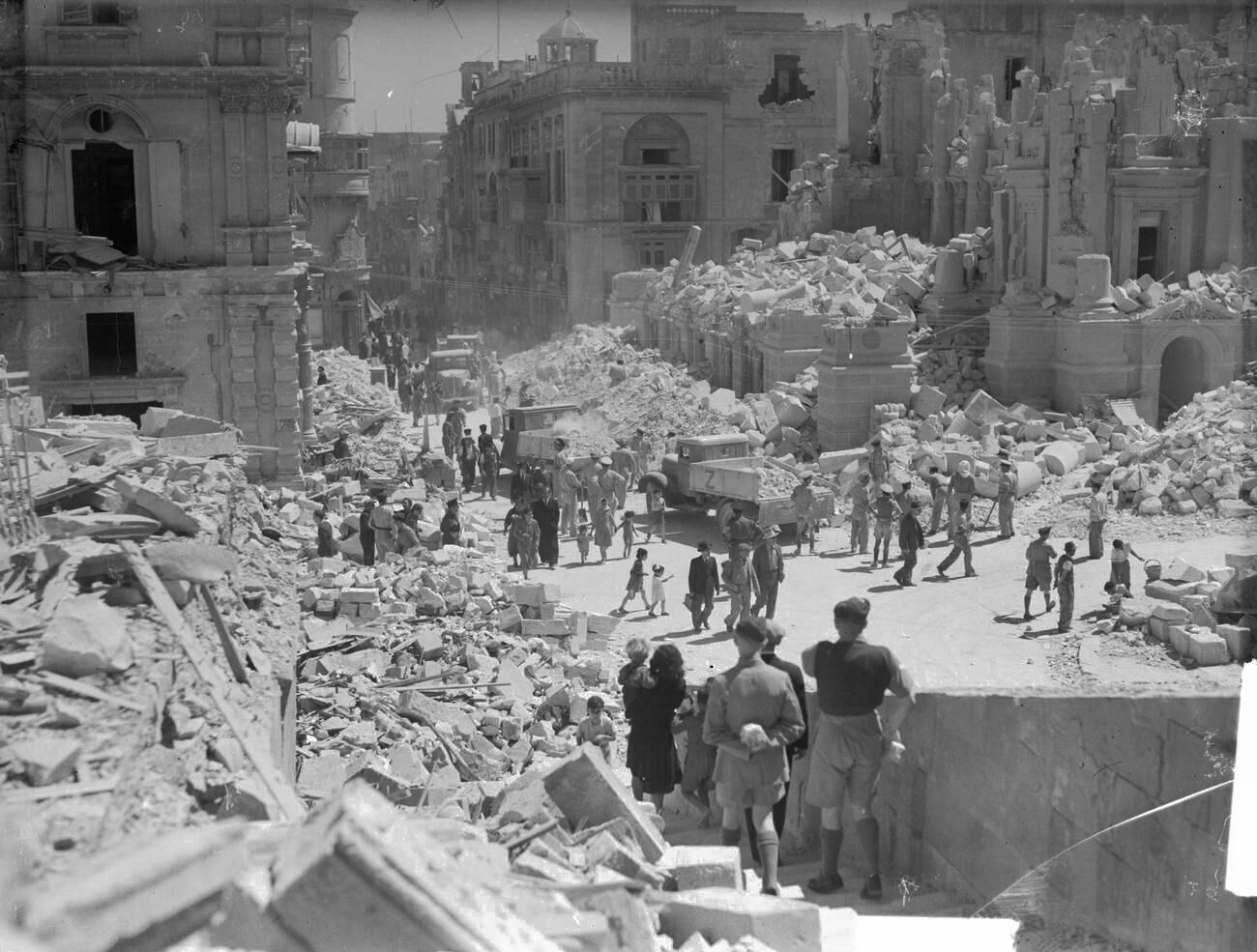
Service personnel and civilians clear up debris on a heavily bomb-damaged street in Valletta, Malta, on 1 May 1942.

From April 1941, the regiment, together with 7th HAA Rgt and the Royal Malta Artillery HAA, came under 7 AA Brigade covering the south half of the island, while 10 AA Brigade took the north. This arrangement was found not to work, and soon 7 AA Bde took over all the LAA and S/L defences, and 10th AA Bde commanded the HAA guns, including 10th HAA Rgt, which defended the RAF airfields. New guns and GL Mk. I gun-laying radar also arrived on the island.

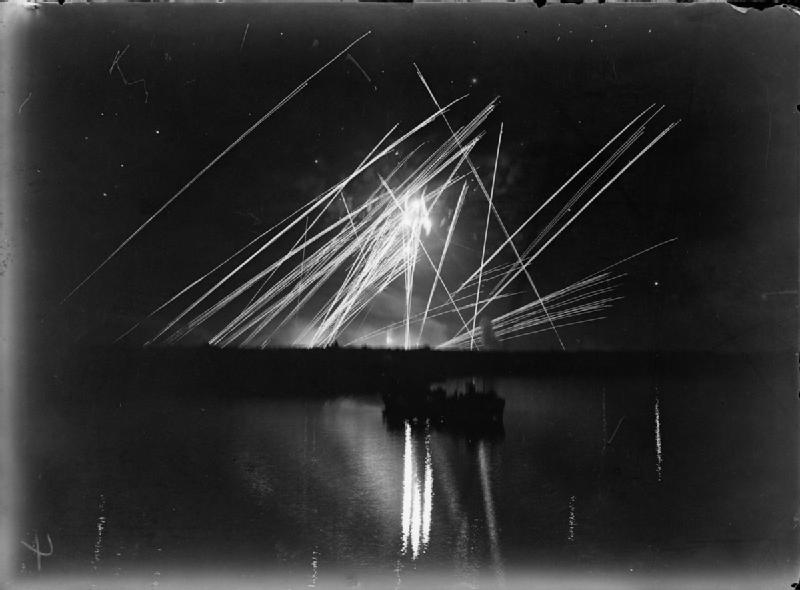
Tracer fire and shellbursts over Grand Harbour during a night air raid.

Malta was largely left alone during the summer of 1941, but attacks resumed in November 1941 after Fliegerkorps II arrived in Sicily. Air raids were increasingly common during November and December, and rations and supplies began to run short. At the turn of the year, 10 HAA Bde instituted a policy of rotating its units to maintain freshness. 10th HAA Rgt exchanged with 7th HAA Rgt and took responsibility for defending Fort Manoel and Grand Harbour. At this point, it manned 4 x 4.5-inch guns, 16 x 3.7-inch and 4 x 3-inch guns.

The Luftwaffe continued to pound the island, concentrating on the harbour and airfields, usually with raids of 15 Ju 88s escorted by 50 or more fighters. By now the RAF fighter strength had been reduced to a handful of aircraft, and the AA guns were the main defence. March and April 1942 were the period of the heaviest air raids on Malta, with well over 250 sorties a day on occasions. In April 1942, the Luftwaffe switched tactics to Flak suppression, with particular attention being paid to the HAA gunsites. On the last day of April the Regia Aeronautica rejoined the attack – which the AA gunners took as a sign that the Luftwaffe was suffering badly. By now each HAA regiment on Malta was rationed to 300 rounds per day and replacement gun barrels were scarce. When the fast minelayer HMS Welshman ran in ammunition supplies on 10 May (part of Operation Bowery), the most intense AA barrage yet fired was provided to protect her while unloading. After that, Axis air raids tailed off during the summer, apart from a flare-up in July.

By October, the Luftwaffe had reinforced Fliegerkorps II, and a new round of heavy raids began, using new low-level tactics. However, these attacks also lost heavily to the AA guns and RAF fighters, despite the increasing shortages of food and supplies on the island. At last, in November Welshman and her sister ship HMS Manxman appeared, followed by a supply convoy. With the Axis defeat at Alamein and the Allied North Africa landings the same month, the siege of Malta was ended. The only enemy air activity for the rest of the year was occasional high-flying reconnaissances and one raid on Luqa in December.

=== Tobruk ===
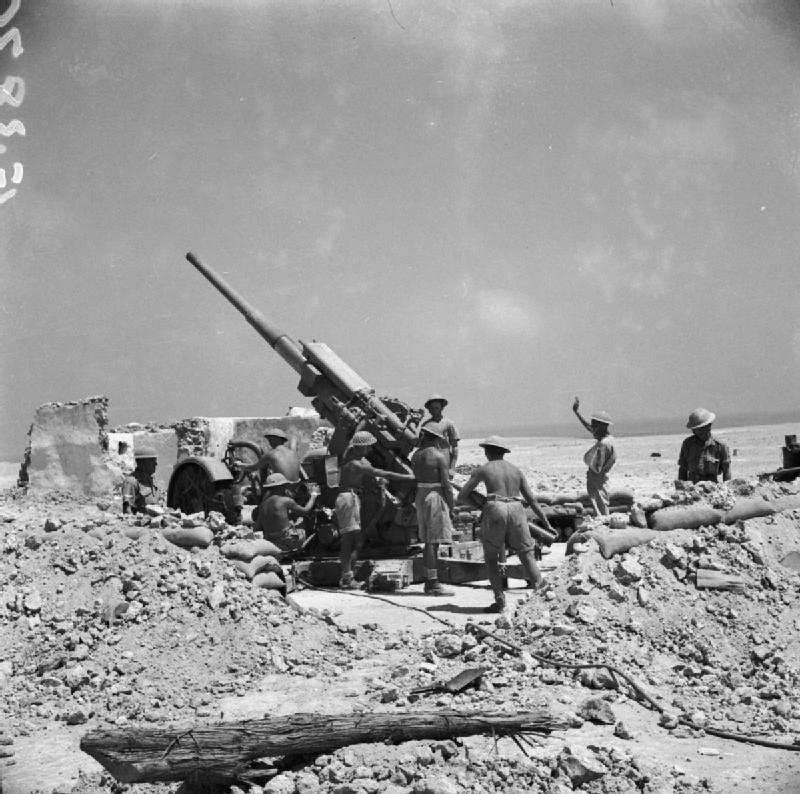
A 3.7-inch HAA gun in the Western Desert.

The rest of 68th (NM) HAA Rgt disembarked at Port Said in Egypt on 22 April 1941 with 200, 276 and 277 HAA Btys, under the command of Lt-Col F. Horlingham. It joined 2 AA Bde defending the Suez Canal and the harbours of Port Said and Port Suez at either end, which were vital to the flow of supplies and reinforcements to the army in the Western Desert. By October 1941, the Suez Canal defences had absorbed 72 HAA guns, while another 40 (including the eight 3.7-inch guns of 277 HAA Bty) were defending the port of Alexandria.

At the end of 1941, the regiment joined Eighth Army for its new offensive in the Western Desert (Operation Crusader), which began in November and succeeded in ending the Siege of Tobruk. 68th HAA Regiment was moved up to defend the captured port of Benghazi. The first phase of 'Crusader' lasted until January 1942, when General Erwin Rommel counter-attacked. Benghazi was lost again on 29 January and Eighth Army fell back and dug in along the Gazala Line.

There was then a lull in the fighting until May, while both sides reorganised. By 12 May 1942, RHQ 68 HAA Rgt and 277 HAA Bty were defending the port of Tobruk under 4 AA Bde, 276 HAA Bty was with 12 AA Bde defending fighter landing grounds for the Desert Air Force, and 200 HAA Bty was at the army's railhead at Fort Capuzzo. On 22 May, the regiment was joined in Tobruk by 107 LAA Bty from 27th LAA Rgt, which formed the sole LAA defence of the harbour.

The Battle of Gazala began on 26 May, and Rommel's Axis forces quickly broke into the British position and began attacking the defensive 'boxes'. After bitter fighting in the Gazala Line and the 'Cauldron', Eighth Army was forced to retreat. The British hoped to defend Tobruk as in the previous siege, but the Axis forces reached it before the defences were ready.

The attack on Tobruk began on 20 June. After the preliminary air bombardment, Axis tanks made rapid progress through the perimeter defences. The 3.7-inch HAA guns had been deeply dug in for protection against dive-bombing, but a four-gun troop of 277 HAA Bty found themselves faced with action at short notice against Panzer III and Panzer IV tanks of 21st Panzer Division driving down the escarpment from 'King's Cross' towards the harbour. The gunners stripped down the walls of their emplacements to permit low-angle fire and engaged the tanks with armour-piercing and high explosive rounds. Together with some South African field guns and medium guns, the position held up a Panzer battalion for four hours and knocked out four tanks, but the outcome was inevitable and the AA positions were 'overrun by swarms of enemy infantry'. Rommel himself referred to the 'extraordinary tenacity' of the strongpoint.

Tobruk surrendered the following day, and around 33,000 Allied troops were captured. 68th HAA Regiment lost its HQ, 277 HAA Bty, and its attached detachments of the Royal Corps of Signals, the Royal Army Service Corps, and workshop section of the Royal Army Ordnance Corps.

After the fall of Tobruk, the Eighth Army retreated in confusion beyond Fort Capuzzo and the Egyptian frontier, with artillery of all sorts involved in rearguard actions. The Axis advance was finally halted at El Alamein. It is not clear how much of 68th HAA Rgt's detached batteries survived the retreat, though 200 HAA Bty joined 69th (Royal Warwickshire Regiment) HAA Rgt for the rest of the war. On 21 September 1942, the remnants of the regiment were officially reduced to a cadre.

=== Reformed ===
After the Tobruk disaster, 222 HAA Bty stationed on Malta as part of 10th HAA Rgt was deemed 'to carry on the honour title, traditions and plate' of 68th (NM) HAA Rgt. On 17 June 1943, RHQ 10th HAA Rgt was officially disbanded and reformed as RHQ 68th (NM) HAA Rgt, with the same batteries: 222 from Derby, 190 and 191 from Birmingham.

At the time, the regiment was manning 15 x 3.7-inch and 6 x 4.5-inch guns and formed part of a large AA concentration protecting the build-up of forces in Malta for the Allied invasion of Sicily (Operation Husky):

- 190 HAA Bty
  - XHE25 (Fleur-de-Lys or 'Flurry') – 3 x static 4.5-inch Mk I, GL Mk II radar
  - XHE26 (Tal-Qroqq) -– 4 x static 3.7-inch Mk II
- 191 HAA Bty
  - XHD17M (Ta Ġiorni, St Julian's) – 3 x static 3.7-inch Mk II
  - XHE28 (Spinola Battery) – 3 x static 4.5-inch Mk I, GL Mk I radar
- 222 HAA Bty:
  - XHE27 (Naxxar) – 4 x static 3.7-inch Mk II
  - XHE33 (Tal-Balal) – 4 x mobile 3.7-inch Mk IA, GL Mk II radar

Although the AA defences of Malta were progressively run down as units returned home or joined the campaigns in Sicily and later in mainland Italy, 68th HAA Rgt remained part of the permanent garrison of the island until the end of the war and beyond. The regiment was placed in suspended animation in Malta in December 1946 so that it could be officially reformed in the TA in the UK on 1 January 1947. (The personnel remaining in Malta became 36 HAA Rgt in the Regular RA.)

== Postwar ==
The regiment was reconstituted at Derby (with many of its Malta veterans returning) as 262 (North Midland) Heavy Anti-Aircraft Regiment, forming part of 58 AA Bde (the former 32 (Midland) AA Bde). The term '(Mixed)' was added to the designation on 1 July 1951, indicating that members of the Women's Royal Army Corps were integrated into the unit.

On 1 January 1954, without changing its title, the regiment absorbed 526 LAA Rgt, another unit based in Derby.

This lasted until the disbandment of AA Command in March 1955 when there were wholesale mergers among TA units. 262 (NM) HAA Regiment was amalgamated with 579 (Royal Leicestershire Regiment) LAA Rgt and 585 (Northamptonshire Regiment) LAA/Searchlight Rgt to form 438 LAA Rgt. The new unit was organised as follows:

- RHQ at Leicester
- P (North Midland) Bty at Derby
- Q (Royal Leicestershire Regiment) at Leicester
- R (Northamptonshire Regiment) Bty at Northampton

The new regiment was relatively short-lived, being broken up on 1 May 1961, when the Royal Leicestershire and Northamptonshire batteries rejoined their parent infantry regiments. P Battery was converted to the Royal Engineers, becoming 438 (Derbyshire Artillery) Field Squadron in a newly formed 140 Corps Engineer Regiment, Royal Engineers based in Nottingham.

140 Corps Engineer Rgt was disbanded in 1967 when the TA was reduced to the Territorial and Army Volunteer Reserve, but elements contributed to the formation of the Derbyshire Battalion of the Sherwood Foresters.

== Insignia ==
While stationed on Malta, 222 HAA Bty adopted an embroidered arm badge consisting of a white Maltese cross on a shield divided vertically in the Royal Artillery colours of red (left) and blue (right). This badge was subsequently adopted after the war by 262 HAA Rgt and continued in use with P Bty of 438 LAA Rgt.

== Honorary Colonel ==
The following officers served as Honorary Colonel of the unit:

- Brig H.A. Chandos-Gell, former CO, appointed 1 May 1913
- Hon Col C.C. Leveson-Gower, CMG, OBE, former CO of 3rd North Midland Bde
- Bt Col W.J. Beddows, MC, former CO
- Bt Col H.G. Hetherington, former CO, appointed 6 April 1938

== Memorials ==
There are two memorials to the 46th (North Midland) Division on the battlefield of the Hohenzollern Redoubt: one on the road between Vermelles and Hulluch, marking the jumping-off point of the attack, and one on the site of the redoubt itself, which lists all the units of the division.

In 1927, bronze memorial plaques to the men of the 59th (2nd North Midland) Division who died in the First World War were erected in the parish churches of the towns and cities most closely connected with the division, including All Saints' Church, Derby (which became Derby Cathedral that year), and Chesterfield Parish Church in Derbyshire. These tablets list all the units of the division.

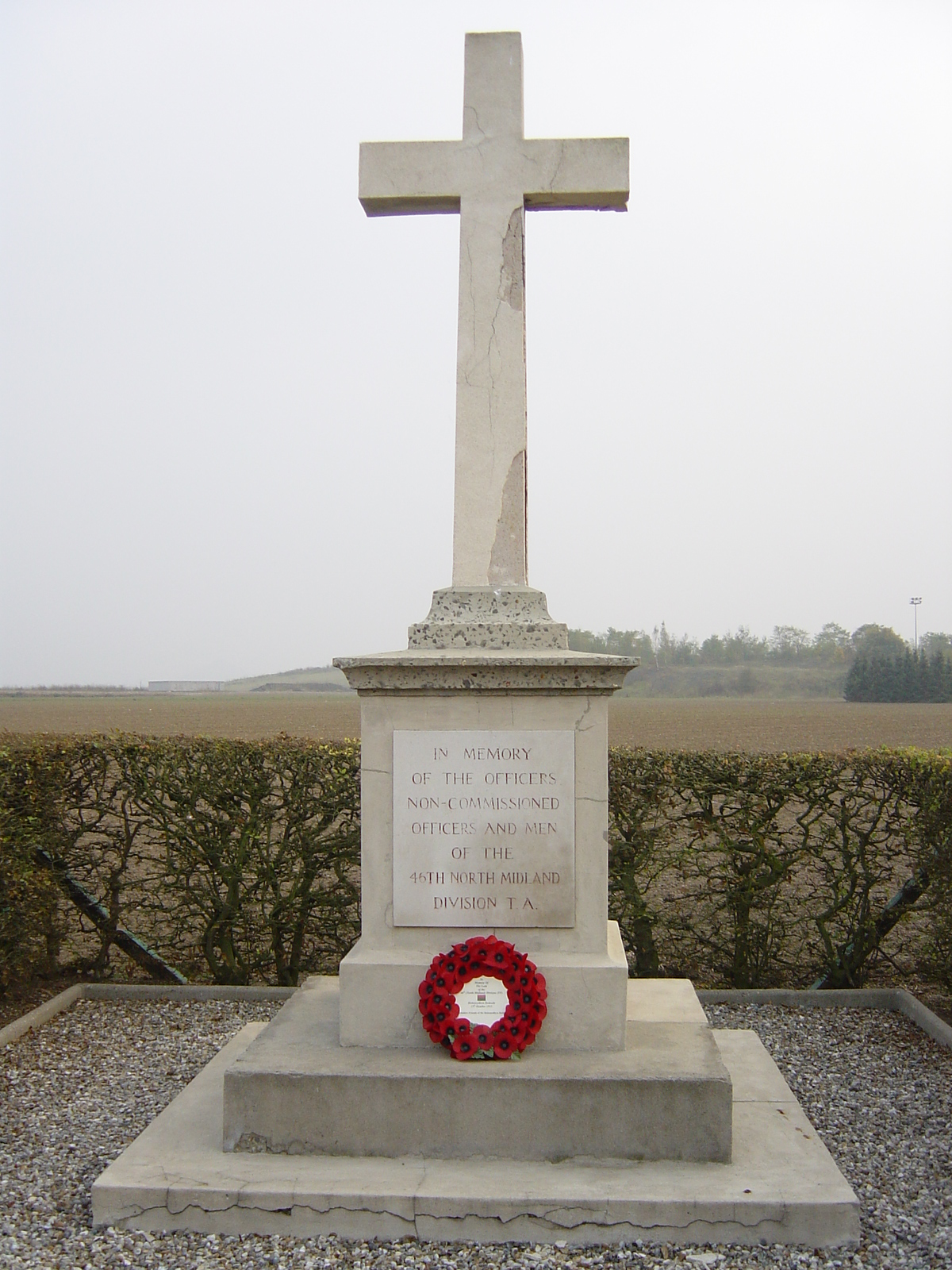
The 46th (North Midland) Division memorial on the road between Vermelles and Hulluch

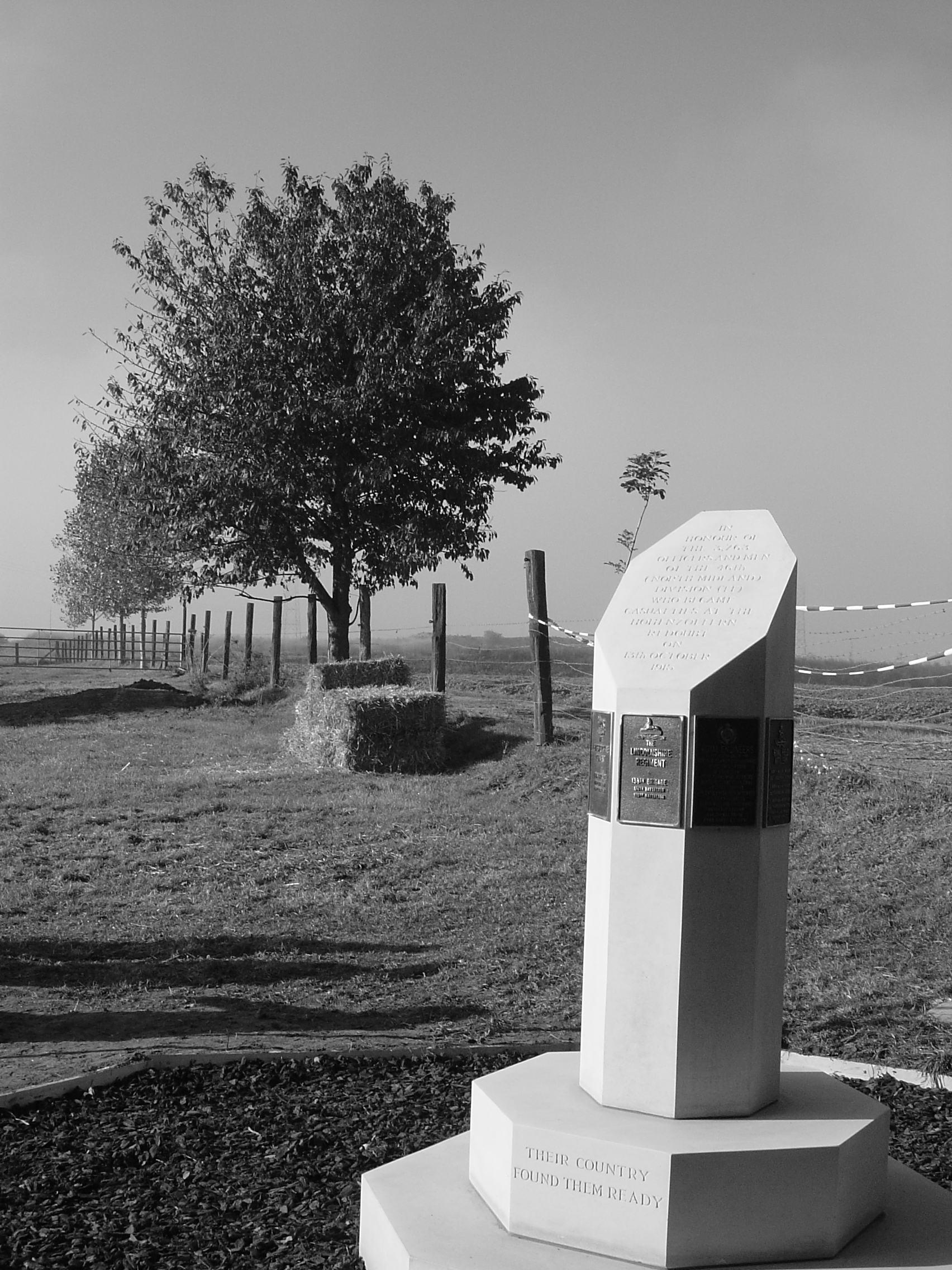
The memorial honouring the casualties of the 46th Division at the Hohenzollern Redoubt
