= H. FitzHerbert Wright =

English cricketer, lawyer, and politician

Henry FitzHerbert Wright (9 October 1870 – 23 February 1947) was an English cricketer, lawyer and Conservative politician. He was active in local government in Derbyshire and sat in the House of Commons from 1912 to 1918.

Wright was the eldest son of FitzHerbert Wright of the Hayes, Alfreton, Derbyshire and his wife Louise Charlotte Rudolphine von Beckmann, daughter of E C Frederick von Beckmann. His paternal grandparents were Francis Wright of Osmaston, proprietor of the Butterley Company, and his wife Selena FitzHerbert, daughter of Sir Henry FitzHerbert 3rd Bt. of Tissington Hall. He was educated at Eton where he was a proficient cricketer and at Trinity College, Cambridge. In the 1891 season he played two games for Derbyshire, making his debut against Marylebone Cricket Club (MCC). He played one game for Derbyshire against Essex in the 1892 season and spent the following winter touring in Ceylon and India with Lord Hawke's XI.

Wright suspended his first-class cricket career and was called to the bar at Inner Temple in 1895. He was on the Midland Circuit and was an alderman of the Derbyshire County Council. He returned to first-class cricket in the 1904 season when he played two games for Derbyshire. In the 1905 season managed he seven games and ended his cricket career. Wright was a right hand batsman who played 22 matches in 13 first-class games with an average of 19.38 and a top score of 55. He was a right-arm medium pace bowler.

Wright was commissioned as a Territorial Force captain in the 1st Derbyshire Howitzer Battery of the Royal Field Artillery in 1908. He served in Derbyshire as a justice of the peace and vice chair of the County Council.

Wright was elected as Member of Parliament (MP) for the Leominster constituency at an unopposed by-election in 1912, following the retirement of the incumbent. He also saw service with the Royal Artillery during World War I from 1914 to 1917. He held his parliamentary seat until the general election of 1918.

Wright was High Sheriff of Derbyshire in 1927, and chairman of the River Trent Catchment Board from 1931 to 1937. He was also a governor of Repton School.

Wright died at his home near Ashbourne, Derbyshire at the age of 76.

Wright married Muriel Harriet Fletcher. Among his children were Muriel Wright, who had a wartime affair with Ian Fleming and is commonly thought to have been the inspiration for the first Bond girl; and Margaret Wright who married Prince Michael Bagration-Imeretinsky, son of the head of the royal house of Georgia. He is also the maternal great-grandfather of Sarah Ferguson, through her mother Susan Barrantes.

Parliament of the United Kingdom
| Preceded by Sir James Rankin | Member of Parliament for Leominster; 1912–1918 | Succeeded by Charles Ward-Jackson |
Honorary titles
| Preceded by George Buckston | High Sheriff of Derbyshire; 1927–1928 | Succeeded by John Drury-Lowe |
