= De La Rue baronets =

Baronetcy in the Baronetage of the United Kingdom

Escutcheon of the de la Rue baronets of Cadogan Square

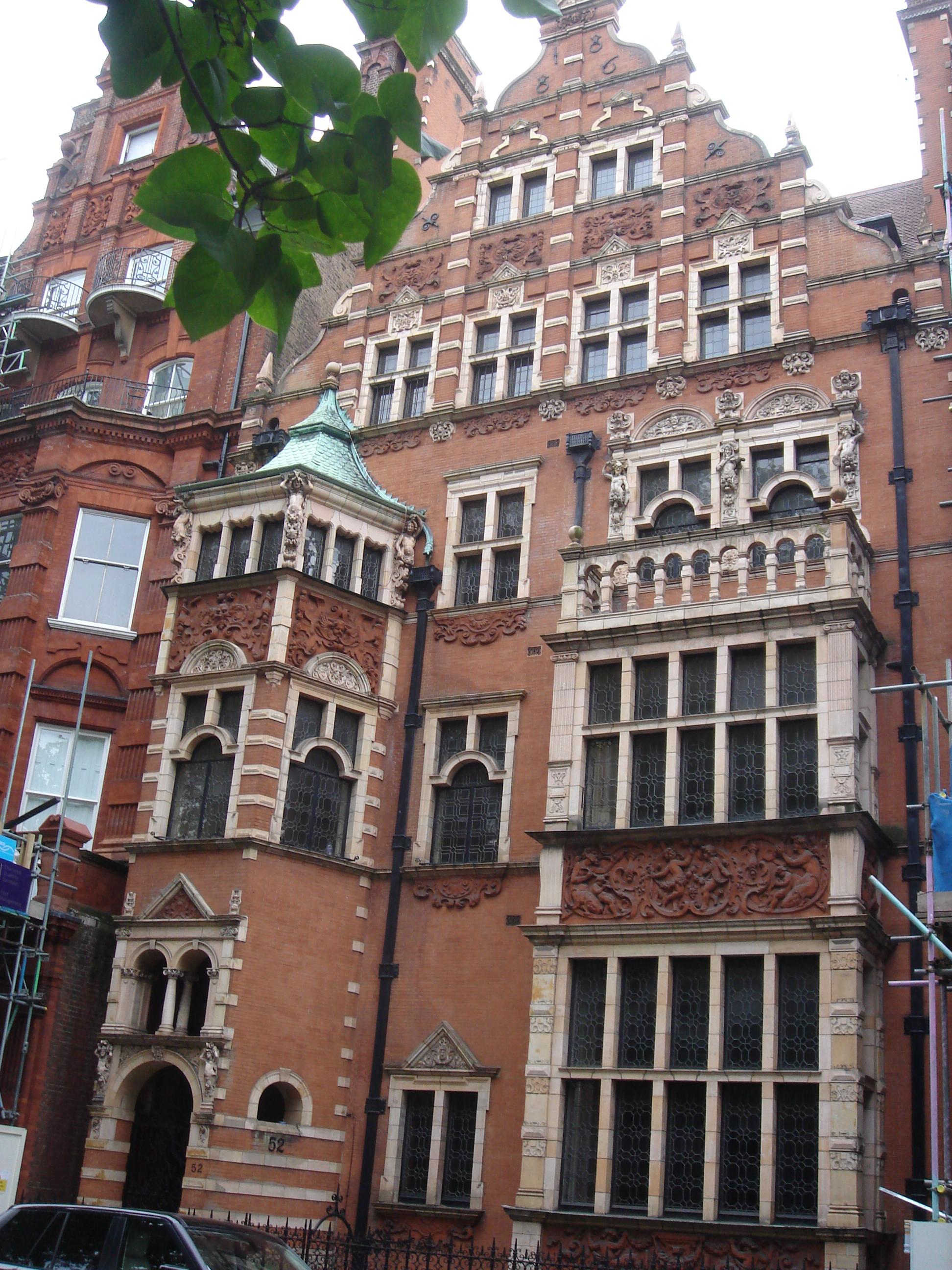
52 Cadogan Square, built for Sir Thomas Andros de la Rue, 1st Baronet

The de la Rue Baronetcy, of Cadogan Square in Chelsea in the County of London, is a title in the Baronetage of the United Kingdom. It was created on 17 June 1898 for Thomas de la Rue, Chairman of Thomas de la Rue and Co.

== de la Rue baronets, of Cadogan Square (1898) ==
- Sir Thomas Andros de la Rue, 1st Baronet (1849–1911)
- Sir Evelyn Andros de la Rue, 2nd Baronet (1879–1950)
- Sir Eric Vincent de la Rue, 3rd Baronet (1906–1989)
- Sir Andrew George Ilay de la Rue, 4th Baronet (1946–2020)
- Sir Edward Walter Henry de la Rue, 5th Baronet (born 1986)

The heir presumptive is the present holder's brother Harry William John de la Rue (born 1989).

== Notes ==
Baronetage of the United Kingdom
Preceded by Maclure baronets	de La Rue baronets of Cadogan Square; 17 June 1898	Succeeded by Dundas baronets
