= Sir James Rankin, 1st Baronet =

British politician (1842–1915)

The Right Honourable Sir James Rankin, Bt JP DL
- Rankin in 1895

Member of Parliament for Leominster
- In office 1910–1912
- Preceded by: Edmund Lamb
- Succeeded by: H. FitzHerbert Wright
- In office 1886–1906
- Preceded by: Thomas Duckham
- Succeeded by: Edmund Lamb
- In office 1880–1885
- Preceded by: Thomas Blake
- Succeeded by: Thomas Duckham

Personal details
- Born: James Rankin; 25 December 1842 Liverpool, England
- Died: 17 April 1915 (aged 72)
- Party: Conservative
- Spouse: Annie Laura Bushell (after 1865)
- Parent(s): Robert Rankin; Ann Strang
- Education: Trinity College, Cambridge

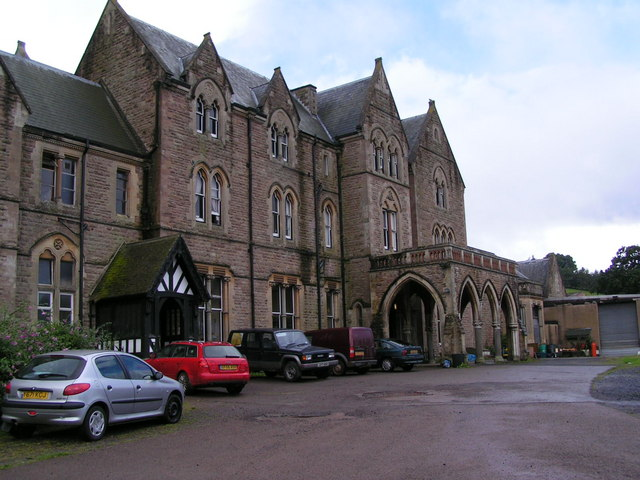
Bryngwyn Manor, the seat commissioned and built by Sir James Rankin 1868–70

Sir James Rankin, 1st Baronet JP DL (25 December 1842 – 17 April 1915) was a Conservative Party politician in the United Kingdom.

== Early life ==
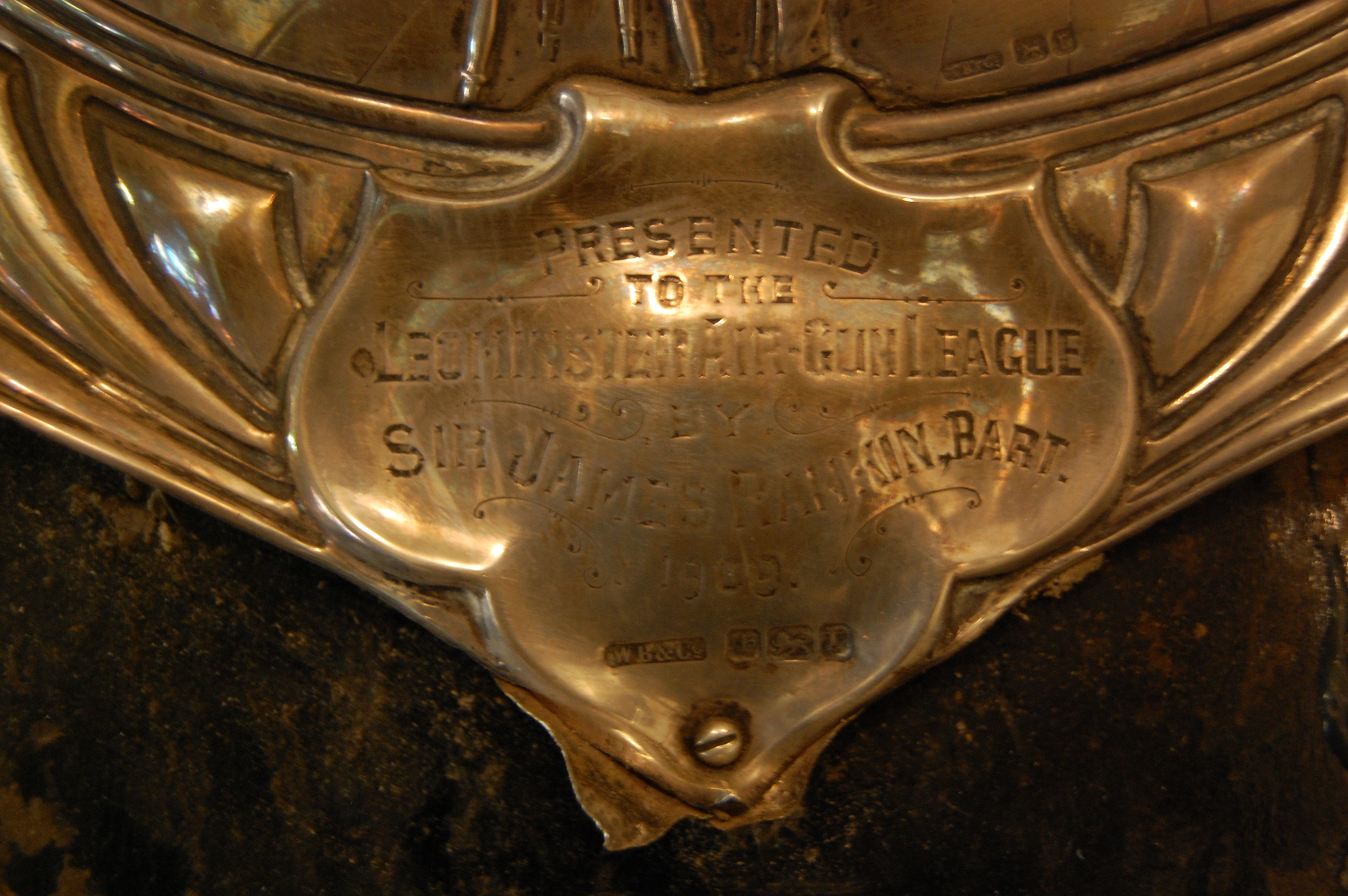
Close up of a trophy, presented by Rankin to the Leominster Air-Gun League in 1909, and now in Leominster Museum

Rankin was born on 25 December 1842 at Liverpool, England. He was the eldest son of Robert Rankin (1801–1870), a timber merchant and shipowner, and his wife Ann (née Strang) Ranking (1812–1875). His sister, Ann Rankin, was the first wife of David MacIver, MP.

His paternal grandparents were James Rankin and Helen (née Ferguson) Rankin. His uncle, Alexander Rankin, was a Scottish timber merchant and shipowner. His maternal grandfather was John Strang, a prominent Scottish merchant of St. Andrews, New Brunswick. Through his aunt Agnes Strang (wife of Allan Gilmour), he was a first cousin of Sir John Gilmour, 1st Baronet.

He earned a first-class degree in the Natural Science Tripos at Trinity College, Cambridge.

== Career ==
He was Member of Parliament for Leominster from 1880 to 1885, and from 1886 until the general election of 1906, losing the seat by only 28 votes to the Liberal candidate. He regained the seat in January 1910 and resigned in March 1912. He served as a Justice of the Peace and Deputy Lieutenant for Herefordshire. He was made a Baronet on 20 June 1898, of Bryngwyn (Bryngwyn Manor, near Wormelow Tump), Herefordshire.

He was a senior partner of the family timber and shipbuilding company, Pollok, Gilmour and Company, founded by his great-uncles, John Pollok and Arthur Pollok. The Rankin Constitutional Club, in Corn Square, Leominster, is named after him.

== Personal life ==
On 12 January 1865, he married Annie Laura Bushell (c. 1843–1920), the daughter Christopher Bushell JP (1810–1886) and Margaret (née Easton) Bushell of Hinderton Hall, Cheshire. Together, they had four sons and four daughters, including:

- Annie Beatrice Rankin (1866–1943), who married Claude Arthur Cuthbert, son of William Cuthbert, in 1887.
- Margaret Ethel Rankin (d. 1949), who married Capt. Thomas Raymond Symons in 1888.
- Sir James Reginald Lea Rankin, 2nd Baronet (1871–1931), a Lt Col who married Hon. Nest Rice, daughter of Arthur Rice, 6th Baron Dynevor, in 1896.
- Mary Sybil Rankin (1875–1956), who married Maj. Charles Francis Kynaston Mainwaring, son of Salusbury Kynaston Mainwaring, in 1903.
- Charles Herbert Rankin (1873–1946), a Brig.-Gen. who married Enid Maud Williams, daughter of Judge Gwylim Williams, in 1908.
- Edwyn Christopher Rankin (1879–1925), who married Helena Mabel Galloway, daughter of Charles John Galloway, in 1914.
- Veronica Rankin (1881–1960), who married John Ellison Otto in 1909.
- Robert Rankin (1883–1945), a barrister who was a Captain in the Irish Guards.

Sir James died on 17 April 1915 and was succeeded by his eldest son, Reginald.

== See also ==
- Rankin baronets

Parliament of the United Kingdom
Preceded by Thomas Blake	Member of Parliament for Leominster; 1880–1885	Succeeded by Thomas Duckham
Preceded by Thomas Duckham	Member of Parliament for Leominster; 1886–1906	Succeeded by Edmund Lamb
Preceded by Edmund Lamb	Member of Parliament for Leominster; Jan. 1910–1912	Succeeded by H. FitzHerbert Wright
Party political offices
Preceded by Sir Henry Northcote	Chairman of the National Union of Conservative and Constitutional Associations; 1894	Succeeded by Howard Vincent
Baronetage of the United Kingdom
New creation	Baronet (of Bryngwyn, Hereford); 1898–1915	Succeeded by Reginald Rankin
