= 1912 Leominster by-election =

UK parliamentary by-election

A 1912 by-election was held for the British House of Commons constituency of Leominster on 18 March 1912. The seat had become vacant on the resignation of the Conservative Member of Parliament Sir James Rankin, 1st Baronet, who had held the seat since the January 1910 general election, with a majority of 831, increased to 1,169 in the second general election of November that year.

The Conservative candidate, Captain Henry FitzHerbert Wright, won unopposed.

== See also ==
- Leominster (UK Parliament constituency)
- List of United Kingdom by-elections
