= Sir Hugh Rankin, 3rd Baronet =

British baronet (1899–1988)

Sir Hugh Charles Rhys Rankin, 3rd Baronet (1899 – 25 April 1988) was a soldier and sheep farmer and noted eccentric, who was the President of the British Muslim Society in 1935 for a short period.

The son of Lt-Col Sir (James) Reginald Lea Rankin, 2nd Baronet, a big game hunter, Rankin was born 'Hubert', but changed his first name to Hugh; he would later be known as 'Omar', 'Sammy Parks', and 'Rankin Stewart' (having adopted the surname of Stewart by deed poll in 1932, retaining it until 1946).

Rankin was born in the Tunisian desert, and educated at Harrow; he ran away and worked in a Belfast shipyard, then enlisted in the army. As a soldier with the 1st Royal Dragoons, he became a broadsword champion in 1921, but suffered an injury through a sniper's attack that ended his military career. At the time he inherited his father's baronetcy, Rankin was working as a sheep farmer in Western Australia. It was his subsequent travels in the Middle East that led to his meeting Lord Headley (known as Shaikh Rahmatullah al-Farooq), who persuaded Rankin to convert to Islam. He adopted the name Omar, and in 1935 took the position of President of the British Muslim Society. Finding a lack of fellowship with other members, however, he resigned after a few weeks, and turned to Buddhism. Sir Hugh served as a Captain during the Second World War; this led him to believe in the value of a future revolution, and by the time he was elected to Perthshire County Council in 1950, he described himself as 'a... red militant communist'. He was the first President of the Rough-Stuff Fellowship, a cross-country cycling enthusiasts' organisation, and a Fellow of the Society of Antiquaries of Scotland.

Sir Hugh was married twice; firstly, in 1932, to Helen Margaret, daughter of Sir Charles John Stewart (and a grand-daughter of the 3rd Earl of Norbury) and secondly, in 1946, to Robina Kelly. He was survived by his second wife, Lady Robina, and his baronetcy was inherited by his nephew, Sir Ian Niall Rankin, 4th Baronet.

Baronetage of the United Kingdom
Preceded by Reginald Rankin	Baronet (of Bryngwyn); 1931–1988	Succeeded by Ian Rankin
