= Rankin baronets =

Set index for Rankin baronets

There have been two baronetcies created for persons with the surname Rankin, both in the Baronetage of the United Kingdom. As of 2026 one creation is extant.

- Rankin baronets of Bryngwyn (1898)
- Rankin baronets of Broughton Tower (1937): see Sir Robert Rankin, 1st Baronet (1877–1960)
