= John Hood =

John Hood may refer to:

== People ==
- John Hood (MP, fl.1393–99), English politician, MP for Leominster
- John Hood (MP, fl.1421–29), English politician, MP for Leominster
- John Hood (inventor) (1720–c.1783), Irish surveyor and inventor
- John Hood (Australian politician) (c. 1817–1877), member of the Victorian Legislative Council, and later, the Victorian Legislative Assembly
- John Bell Hood (1831–1879), Confederate general during American Civil War
- John Hood (painter) (c.1839–1924), South Australian painter
- John Mifflin Hood (1843–1906), American railroad executive
- John Hood (naval officer) (1859–1919), rear admiral of the United States Navy during World War I
- John Hood (diplomat) (1904–1991), Australian diplomat
- John Linsley Hood (1925–2004), British electronics designer
- John Hood (Georgia politician), state representative for Atlanta who served in the 128th Georgia General Assembly
- John Hood (university administrator) (born 1952), New Zealand businessman and university administrator, vice chancellor of the University of Oxford (2004–09)

== Ship ==
- USS John Hood (DD-655), a Fletcher-class destroyer of the United States Navy

== See also ==
- Hood (surname)
- John Cockburn-Hood (1844–1902), English cricketer
