= Bossom =

Bossom is a surname. Notable people with the surname include:

- Alfred Bossom, Baron Bossom FRIBA (1881–1965), English architect active in the United States
- Clive Bossom FRSA, FRGS (1918–2017), British Conservative Party politician and Member of Parliament
- Bossom baronets, of Maidstone in the County of Kent, a title in the Baronetage of the United Kingdom
