= Peter Cook (MP) =

English politician

Peter Cook (fl. 1390–1391), of Leominster, Herefordshire, was an English politician.

He was a Member (MP) of the Parliament of England for Leominster in January 1390 and 1391.

Parliament of England
Preceded by John Aston; Walter Aston	Member of Parliament for Leominster; 1390; With: Hugh Aston	Succeeded by ? ?
Parliament of England
Preceded by ? ?	Member of Parliament for Leominster; 1391; With: John Bradford	Succeeded by Roger Loutwardin; John Hood
