= Hugh Aston (disambiguation) =

Hugh Aston, variously spelled Hugh Ashton, Hugo Asseton, or Hugh Haston, may refer to:

- Hugh Aston (c. 1485–1558), English composer and MP
- Hugh Aston (fl. 1390), Member of Parliament (MP) for Leominster
- Hugh Ashton (died 1522), English churchman
- Hugh C. S. Ashton, British polo champion in the 1920s
