= Edmund Morris (MP for Leominster) =

English politician

Edmund Morris (fl. 1410), of Kingsland, Herefordshire, was an English politician.

His son, John Morris, was also an MP.

He was a Member (MP) of the Parliament of England for Leominster in 1410.

Parliament of England
Preceded by William Taverner; William Tiler	Member of Parliament for Leominster; 1410; With: Walter Borgate	Succeeded by ? ?
