= Hakluyt =

Hakluyt may refer to:

- Richard Hakluyt (died 1616), English writer
- Richard Hakluyt (barrister) (died 1591)
- Thomas Hakluyt, Member of the Parliament of England
- Hakluyt and Company
- Hakluyt Island, in Baffin Bay, Greenland
- Hakluyt Society
