= William Tyler =

William Tyler may refer to:

- William Seymour Tyler (1810–1897), historian
- William Tyler (rugby), rugby player active c. 1907–08
- William R. Tyler (1910–2003), American diplomat
- William Tyler (musician) (born 1979), American musician
- William Tyler (bishop) (1806–1849), American Roman Catholic bishop of Hartford
- William Tyler (architect) (1728–1801), English sculptor, landscaper, and architect, and a founding member of the Royal Academy
- William Tyler (footballer), English footballer
- William Tyler (baseball) (1905–1970), American Negro leagues baseball player
- William Tyler (MP) for Northumberland (UK Parliament constituency)

== See also ==
- William Tiler, MP for Leominster, 1406–1410
