= Edward Croft =

Edward Croft may refer to:

- Eddie Croft (Edward Lee Croft), boxer
- Edward Croft (MP) (died 1601), English politician
