= Thomas Coningsby (disambiguation) =

Thomas Coningsby was an English soldier and MP for Herefordshire.

Thomas Coningsby may also refer to:

- Thomas Coningsby (MP for Middlesex), see Middlesex
- Thomas Coningsby I (fl. 1559), MP for Leominster
- Thomas Coningsby II (died 1616), MP for Leominster
- Thomas Coningsby, 1st Earl Coningsby (1656–1729), English politician
