= Thomas Reynold (MP) =

English politician

Thomas Reynold (fl. 1395–1397), of Leominster, Herefordshire, was an English politician.

He was a Member (MP) of the Parliament of England for Leominster in 1395 and January 1397.

Parliament of England
Preceded by ? ?	Member of Parliament for Leominster; 1395; With: Thomas Barber	Succeeded by Thomas Reynold; William Colle
Parliament of England
Preceded by Thomas Barber; Thomas Reynold	Member of Parliament for Leominster; Jan. 1397; With: William Colle	Succeeded by William Taverner; John Romayn
