= Thomas White (MP for Leominster) =

English politician

Thomas White (fl. 1399), of Leominster, Herefordshire, was an English politician.

He was a Member (MP) of the Parliament of England for Leominster in 1399.

Parliament of England
Preceded by William Taverner; John Romayn	Member of Parliament for Leominster; 1399; With: John Hood	Succeeded by ? ?
