= Coningsby (disambiguation) =

Coningsby is in Lincolnshire, England.

Coningsby may also refer to:

- Coningsby (novel)
- Royal Air Force Station Coningsby, near to and named for the town
- Fitzwilliam Coningsby (c.1600-1666) Royalist
- Humphrey Coningsby (judge) (1459-1535) English judge
- Humphrey Coningsby (died 1559) MP for Herefordshire
- Humphrey Coningsby (died 1601) MP for St Albans
- Humphrey Coningsby (born ca 1623) MP and Royalist
- Richard Coningsby (died 1620) MP and Black Rod
- Thomas Coningsby (disambiguation)
- William Coningsby (1483-1540) MP and bencher

== See also ==
- George Capel-Coningsby, 5th Earl of Essex (1757- 1839)
