= Robert Caldebrook =

Member of the Parliament of England

Robert Caldebrook (fl. 1386–1388), of Leominster, Herefordshire, was an English Member of Parliament.

He was a Member (MP) of the Parliament of England for Leominster in 1386 and February 1388.

Parliament of England
Preceded by ? ?	Member of Parliament for Leominster; 1386; With: Walter Aston	Succeeded by Robert Caldebrook; John Montgomery
Preceded by Robert Caldebrook; Walter Aston	Member of Parliament for Leominster; Feb. 1388; With: John Montgomery	Succeeded by John Aston; Walter Aston
