= Grenville Jones =

Thomas Grenville Jones (23 July 1922 – 2 February 2000), was a Welsh political consultant and Liberal Party politician.

== Background ==
He was educated at Llandrindod Wells, Tonbridge School and St. Catharine's College, Cambridge. In 1966 he married Jill Pound-Corner.

== Professional career ==
Jones served as a wireless operator/air gunner in the war. After completing his law exams in 1950 he was admitted into the Middle Temple. He worked as a journalist. He worked on the Crossbencher column of the Sunday Express. He became a senior partner in a firm of commercial advisers.

== Political career ==
Jones was President of Cambridge University Liberal Club in 1949. He was Liberal candidate for the Isle of Ely division of Cambridgeshire at the 1950 General Election. He was Liberal candidate for the Leominster division of Herefordshire at the 1959 General Election. He was Liberal candidate for the Tavistock division of Devon at the 1964 General Election. He did not stand for parliament again.

=== Electoral record ===
General Election 1950: Isle of Ely
Party	Candidate	Votes	%	±%
Conservative	Harry Legge-Bourke	21,528	45.0	+4.4
Labour	Alfred Francis Colenso Gray	16,565	34.6	+0.1
Liberal	Grenville Jones	9,733	20.4	−4.5
Majority		4,963	10.4	+4.3
Turnout		47,826	79.6	+11.8
Conservative hold		Swing	+2.1	

General Election 1959: Leominster
Party	Candidate	Votes	%	±%
Conservative	Clive Bossom	16,642	55.4	−9.9
Liberal	Grenville Jones	6,905	23.0	n/a
Labour	Frederick W Bowerman	6,475	21.6	−13.1
Majority		9,737	32.4	+1.4
Turnout			76.4	
Conservative hold		Swing	n/a	

General Election 1964: Tavistock
Party	Candidate	Votes	%	±%
Conservative	Henry Studholme	19,493	47.8	−5.9
Liberal	Greville Jones	14,093	34.5	+10.0
Labour	John A Elswood	7,226	17.7	−4.1
Majority		5,400	13.2	−16.1
Turnout		40,812		
Conservative hold		Swing	-7.9	
