= John Montgomery (Leominster MP) =

English politician

John Montgomery (fl. 1388) was an English politician.

He was a Member (MP) of the Parliament of England for Leominster in February 1388. He is unidentified.

Parliament of England
Preceded by Robert Caldebrook; Walter Aston	Member of Parliament for Leominster; Feb. 1388; With: Robert Caldebrook	Succeeded by John Aston; Walter Aston
