= John Hood (14th-century MP) =

English politician

John Hood (fl. 1393–1399), of Leominster, Herefordshire, was an English politician.

His sons were also MPs: John and Thomas Hood.

He was a Member (MP) of the Parliament of England for Leominster in 1393 and 1399.

Parliament of England
Preceded by Peter Cook; John Bradford	Member of Parliament for Leominster; 1393; With: Roger Loutwardin	Succeeded by ? ?
Parliament of England
Preceded by William Taverner; John Romayn	Member of Parliament for Leominster; 1399; With: Thomas White	Succeeded by ? ?
