= John Bond (MP for Leominster) =

English politician

John Bond (fl. 1402) was an English politician.

He was a Member (MP) of the Parliament of England for Leominster in 1402. Nothing further on him has been found to have been recorded.

Parliament of England
Preceded by ? ?	Member of Parliament for Leominster; 1402; With: William Taverner	Succeeded by ? ?
