= Thomas Hood (disambiguation) =

Thomas Hood (1799–1845) was an English poet, author and humorist.

Thomas Hood may also refer to:

- Thomas Hood Hood, member of the New South Wales Legislative Council
- Thomas Hood (mathematician) (1556–1620), first lecturer in mathematics appointed in England
- Thomas Hood (mayor) (died 1702), mayor of New York 1701–1702
- Thomas Hood (Leominster MP), English politician
- Thomas Hood (American politician) (1816–1883), American politician
- Tom Hood (1835–1874), writer
