= Thomas Barber (fl. 1395) =

English politician

Thomas Barber (fl. 1395), born in Ireland and then settled in Leominster, Herefordshire, was an English politician.

He was a Member (MP) of the Parliament of England for Leominster in 1395.

Parliament of England
Preceded by ? ?	Member of Parliament for Leominster; 1395; With: Thomas Reynold	Succeeded by Thomas Reynold; William Colle
