= Richard Cupper =

16th-century English politician

Richard Cupper or Couper (by 1519 – 1583/84), of London; Powick and Worcester, Worcestershire, was an English politician.

He was a Member (MP) of the Parliament of England for Leominster in 1547, for Old Sarum in April 1554 and for Lichfield in 1558.
