= Bossom baronets =

Baronetcy in the Baronetage of the United Kingdom

The Bossom Baronetcy, of Maidstone in the County of Kent, is a title in the Baronetage of the United Kingdom. It was created on 4 July 1953 for the architect and Conservative Member of Parliament for Maidstone, Alfred Bossom. In 1960 he was further honoured when he was created a life peer as Baron Bossom, of Maidstone in the County of Kent. The life peerage became extinct on his death in 1965 while he was succeeded in the baronetcy by his second but only surviving son, the second holder of the baronetcy. He was a former Conservative Member of Parliament for Leominster.

== Bossom baronets, of Maidstone (1953) ==
- Sir Alfred Charles Bossom, 1st Baronet (1881–1965) (created Baron Bossom in 1960)
- Sir Clive Bossom, 2nd Baronet (1918–2017)
- Sir Bruce Bossom, 3rd Baronet (born 1952)

The heir apparent to the baronetcy is his son George Edward Martin Bossom (born 1992).
