= John George Phillimore =

John George Phillimore (1808–1865) was an English barrister, known as a jurist and Liberal Party politician.

== Life ==
The eldest son of Joseph Phillimore, he was born on 5 January 1808, and was educated at Westminster School. On 28 May 1824 he matriculated at Christ Church, Oxford, of which he was faculty student, and graduated B.A. in 1828, having taken a second class in the classical schools; he proceeded M.A. in 1831.

From 1827 to 1832 Phillimore held a clerkship in the Board of Control for India, and on 23 November 1832 was called to the bar at Lincoln's Inn, where he was elected a bencher in 1851. In 1850 Phillimore was appointed reader in civil law and jurisprudence at the Middle Temple. In 1851 he took silk, and in the following year he was appointed reader in constitutional law and legal history to the Inns of Court.

Phillimore represented Leominster as a Liberal in the Parliament of 1852–1857. He spoke on free trade, legal reform, and the secret ballot. He died on 27 April 1865 at his residence, Shiplake House, Oxfordshire.

== Works ==
Phillimore's writings, all published at London, were:

- Letter to the Lord Chancellor on the Reform of the Law, 1846.
- Thoughts on Law Reform, 1847.
- Introduction to the Study and History of the Roman Law, 1848.
- An Inaugural Lecture on Jurisprudence, and a Lecture on Canon Law, 1851.
- Principles and Maxims of Jurisprudence, 1856.
- Influence of the Canon Law (in Oxford Essays), 1858.
- Private Law among the Romans, 1863.
- History of England during the Reign of George the Third (one volume only), 1863.

== Family ==
By his wife Rosalind Margaret, younger daughter of Sir James Lewis Knight-Bruce, he had issue an only son Egerton Grenville Bagot Phillimore, known as an antiquarian of Welsh language and history.

== Notes ==
Attribution

This article incorporates text from a publication now in the public domain: Lee, Sidney, ed. (1896). "Phillimore, John George". Dictionary of National Biography. Vol. 45. London: Smith, Elder & Co.

Parliament of the United Kingdom
Preceded by Frederick Peel; George Arkwright	Member of Parliament for Leominster; 1852 – 1857; With: George Arkwright to 1856; Gathorne Hardy from 1856	Succeeded by Gathorne Hardy; John Willoughby
