= Bill Wiggin =

British Conservative politician

Sir Bill Wiggin
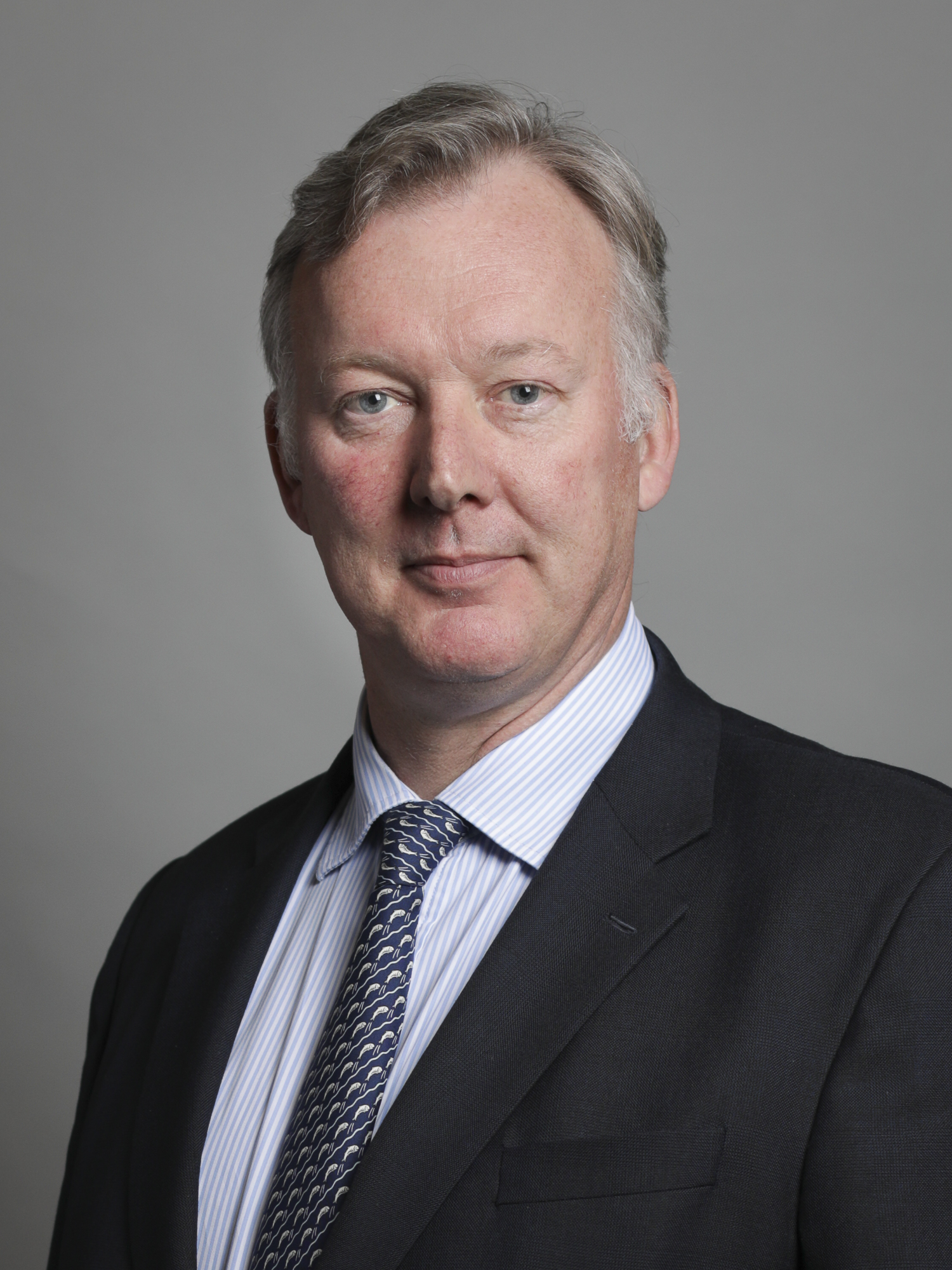
- Official portrait, 2020

Chair of the Committee of Selection
- In office 24 June 2015 – 7 July 2024
- Preceded by: Geoffrey Clifton-Brown
- Succeeded by: Jessica Morden

Shadow Secretary of State for Wales
- In office 11 November 2003 – 8 December 2005
- Leader: Michael Howard
- Preceded by: Nigel Evans
- Succeeded by: Cheryl Gillan

Member of Parliament for North Herefordshire Leominster (2001–2010)
- In office 7 June 2001 – 30 May 2024
- Preceded by: Peter Temple-Morris
- Succeeded by: Ellie Chowns

Personal details
- Born: 4 June 1966 (age 60) London, England
- Party: Conservative
- Spouse: Milly Wiggin
- Children: 3
- Education: Bangor University
- Website: billwiggin.com

Military service
- Allegiance: United Kingdom
- Branch/service: Royal Welch Fusiliers

Sir William David Wiggin (born 4 June 1966) is a former British Conservative Party politician who was the Member of Parliament (MP) for North Herefordshire, previously Leominster, from 2001 to 2024.

== Early life and career ==
Bill Wiggin was born on 4 June 1966 in London. He attended Eton College, where he was an older contemporary of David Cameron, and later read Economics at Bangor University, gaining a Bachelor of Arts degree in 1988. He also served in the Royal Welch Fusiliers in the Territorial Army, being a platoon commander for Holyhead, Bangor and Caernarfon.

Following this, Wiggin worked as a Trader in Foreign Exchange Options for UBS from 1991 to 1993, then was an Associate Director of Kleinwort Benson from 1994 to 1998, then as a manager in the Foreign Exchange department of Commerzbank from 1998.

== Parliamentary career ==
Wiggin stood as the Conservative candidate for Burnley at the 1997 general election, coming second with 20.2% of the vote behind the incumbent Labour MP Peter Pike.

At the 2001 general election, Wiggin was elected to Parliament as MP for Leominster with 49% of the vote and a majority of 10,367.

Initially a backbencher, he became a member of the Environment, Food and Rural Affairs select committee in 2002. During 2003, Michael Howard appointed him to the position of Shadow Minister for Environment, Food and Rural Affairs and Shadow Secretary of State for Wales.

Wiggin was re-elected as MP for Leominster at the 2005 general election with an increased vote share of 52.1% and an increased majority of 13,187.

During his time Shadow Secretary of State for Wales the Conservatives won three seats in Wales at the 2005 general election, the first time Conservatives had been elected as MPs for Wales since the party had lost all its MPs in Wales at the 1997 election. Wiggin welcomed the gains, saying that "Never again will Wales be a Conservative-free zone", although he admitted that while the wins were "a good start" he would have liked the Conservatives to have gained more Welsh seats. Wiggin also expressed regret at Howard's decision to stand down as Conservative leader after the election, adding that he thought Howard had "done a tremendous job" and was "a fantastic example to young Conservative MPs like myself". Despite Wiggin's previous declaration, Wales has again been left without any Conservative MPs after the 2024 general election.

During parish council elections in Leominster during September 2009, Wiggin complained to the returning officer about the leaflets of a candidate who was standing to protest at Wiggin's parliamentary expenses. The candidate, Jim Miller, was disqualified by the returning officer, who was also the chief executive of the Conservative-run Herefordshire County Council. This left the Conservative candidate unopposed. According to The Daily Telegraph, Miller was disqualified over a technicality that the council previously told him had been resolved. The Mayor of Leominster expressed his astonishment at Wiggin's intervention. "I was just stunned that Wiggin contacted the returning officer. It's not totally blatant, but what in god's name is an MP doing poking his nose into a little parish election? I can't understand what he thinks he's up to".

Prior to the 2010 general election, Wiggin's constituency of Leominster was abolished, and replaced with North Herefordshire. At the election, Wiggin was elected to Parliament as MP for North Herefordshire with 51.8% of the vote and a majority of 9,887.

In June 2013, Wiggin spoke in debate in favour of the badger cull, saying he supported the Government policy to "combat" bovine tuberculosis.

In May 2014, Wiggin met with Dafydd Evans, Environment Agency Area Manager for the West Midlands, to press for action to enhance local flood defences.

Wiggin renewed his call for more beds at Hereford County Hospital following a visit in September 2014, during which he toured one of the Canadian hutted units.

In December 2014, Wiggin questioned the Prime Minister David Cameron during PMQs about Hereford County Hospital and sought his support for increasing the hospital's capacity. Following Wiggin's question, the Prime Minister informed him that he would send a Minister to look at the Hospital. In February 2015 Health Secretary Jeremy Hunt paid a visit.

At the 2015 general election, Wiggin was re-elected as MP for North Herefordshire with an increased vote share of 55.8% and an increased majority of 19,996. Following the election, Wiggin was initially set to contest the Chairmanship of the Environment, Food & Rural Affairs Select Committee against eventual chair Neil Parish. Instead Wiggin was subsequently appointed as Chair of the Committee of Selection.

Wiggin was again re-elected at the snap 2017 general election with an increased vote share of 62% and an increased majority of 21,602.

He is a member of the European Research Group and signed a letter to Prime Minister Theresa May on 16 February 2018 regarding Brexit negotiations.

At the 2019 general election, Wiggin was again re-elected with an increased vote share of 63% and an increased majority of 24,856.

In January 2020, Wiggin has described the trend away from eating meat as "a disaster for British agriculture." He has also advised MPs "not to be fooled" by arguments against chlorinated chicken.

He was knighted in the 2022 New Year Honours for political and public service.

In March 2022, Wiggin questioned Boris Johnson over his immigration record in the liaison committee and called on the prime minister to stop letting refugees ‘in rubber boats’ into the country ahead of Ukrainians and Qataris.

Wiggin was one of just two MPs, along with Christopher Chope, to oppose a Bill which proposed to ban the import of Hunting Trophies to the UK from Africa, calling it a "racist" and "neocolonial" piece of legislation which actually does not protect animals.

In March 2024, Wiggin was re-selected as the Conservative candidate for North Herefordshire at the 2024 general election. He lost the election to the Green Party candidate, Dr Ellie Chowns, at 31.5% of the vote to Dr Chowns's 43.2%.

=== Expenses claims ===
During the parliamentary expenses scandal the Daily Telegraph reported that Wiggin had wrongly claimed more than £11,000 mortgage payments on his Herefordshire property. This property had no mortgage and Wiggin who had made 23 declarations that it was his main home said the expenses were claimed in error. The Committee found that Wiggin's mortgage claims were the result of "an unfortunate and unintended muddle" which should have been picked up much more quickly, though no cost to the public purse resulted because Wiggin was entitled to claim for the mortgage payments on his London home. The committee expressed disappointment that Wiggin had not been cooperative with the enquiry as required by the Code of Conduct.

His claims for household bills were also investigated following a complaint. Wiggin had routinely claimed £240 a month for household bills and whilst the Standards and Privileges Committee confirmed that he could claim up to £250 a month without a receipt, this was to cover costs actually incurred.

Wiggin "chose not to" take up the committee's invitation to check his expenses with his bank and service providers and, on balance of probability they found he overclaimed expenses for council tax, telephone and workmen's bills.

In October 2010, Wiggin apologised to the House and was ordered to repay £4,009 utility expenses.

== Post-parliamentary career ==
Following his defeat at the 2024 UK General Election, Wiggin was appointed as Managing Director for Apex Group Ltd.

== Personal life ==
Wiggin is the son of the late Sir Jerry Wiggin, MP for Weston-super-Mare. He lives in Upton Bishop in South Herefordshire, with his wife Milly. She was previously the girlfriend of David Cameron. They have three children.

In addition to acting as a Trustee of the Eveson Charitable Trust, which assigns funding to support medical research and the disadvantaged, Wiggin is patron to several local charities. His interests include motorbikes, DIY, shooting, fishing and Hereford cattle.

== Bibliography ==
- A Better Agenda for the Environment published by Exposure Publishing, an imprint of Diggory Press ISBN 1-84685-067-3

Parliament of the United Kingdom
Preceded by Peter Temple-Morris	Member of Parliament for Leominster; 2001–2010	Constituency abolished
New constituency	Member of Parliament for North Herefordshire; 2010–2024	Succeeded by Ellie Chowns
Political offices
Preceded by Nigel Evans	Shadow Secretary of State for Wales; 2003–2005	Succeeded by Cheryl Gillan
