= Archer Baldwin =

British politician (1883–1966)

Sir Archer Baldwin
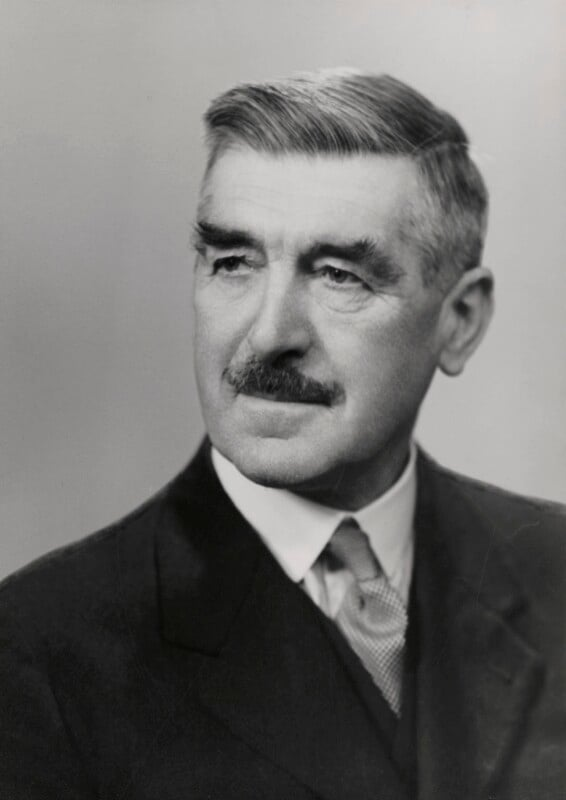
- Baldwin in 1949

Member of Parliament for Leominster
- In office 5 July 1945 – 18 September 1959
- Preceded by: Ernest Shepperson
- Succeeded by: Clive Bossom

Personal details
- Born: Archer Ernest Baldwin; 30 December 1883 Rugby, Tennessee, U.S.
- Died: 27 March 1966 (aged 82) Tenbury Wells, Worcestershire, England
- Party: Conservative

Sir Archer Ernest Baldwin MC (30 December 1883 – 27 March 1966) was a farmer and British Conservative Party member of parliament (MP).

Baldwin was born in a log cabin near Rugby, Tennessee, United States, to where his parents had emigrated. Upon their return to England, he was sent to Lucton School, Herefordshire, and then entered the family business as a cattle and sheep breeder, as well as becoming an auctioneer and land agent.

He married in 1911 and served in the Royal Horse Artillery in the First World War, being awarded the Military Cross for bravery during a 1918 attack on the Hindenburg Line.

Baldwin was active in the National Farmers Union and after being elected as a Conservative MP in 1945, he became a Conservative spokesman on Agriculture, and was knighted in the 1958 Birthday Honours. Baldwin served as the Member of Parliament for Leominster from 1945 to 1959. From 1960 he was a Deputy Lieutenant of Herefordshire. He died at his home in Tenbury Wells, Worcestershire, aged 82.

Parliament of the United Kingdom
Preceded by Sir Ernest Shepperson	Member of Parliament for Leominster; 1945–1959	Succeeded by Clive Bossom
