= Thomas Wykes (MP for Leominster) =

16th-century English politician

Thomas Wykes (fl. 1554), of Moreton Jeffries, Herefordshire, was an English politician.

He was a member (MP) of the parliament of England for Leominster in November 1554.
