= John Bell (Leominster MP) =

16th-century English politician

John Bell (by 1508 – 1533/44), of Leominster, Herefordshire, was an English politician.

He was a Member (MP) of the Parliament of England for Leominster in 1529.

Parliament of England
Preceded by ? ?	Member of Parliament for Leominster; With: John Hillesley	Succeeded by ? ?
