= Joyce Rose =

British magistrate (1929–2013)

Joyce Dora Hester Rose CBE DL (née Woolf; 14 August 1929 – 3 November 2013) was a British magistrate and Liberal Party official.

Born to a Jewish family in North London, Rose was educated at King Alfred School in Hampstead, Queen's College on Harley Street, and in the United States.

In 1963, Rose became a magistrate in Watford, and also became active in the Liberal Party. In 1969, the Liberal Assembly passed a motion she moved, criticising increased levels of illicit drug use and violence on television. She was elected as president of the Women's Liberal Federation in 1972, serving a single term, and was President of the Liberal Party 1979–1980. In 1982, she became the chair of the party, serving for two years.

Rose remained active in the Liberal Party's successor, the Liberal Democrats, but in 1990 was elected as chair of the Magistrates' Association and focused much of her time on the role. She also served as vice-chair of the UK branch of Unicef, and was made a Commander of the Order of the British Empire in the 1981 Birthday Honours.

Party political offices
Preceded by Penelope Jessel	President of the Women's Liberal Federation; 1972–1973	Succeeded by Baroness Seear
Preceded by Roger Pincham	Chair of the Liberal Party; 1982–1984	Succeeded by Paul Tyler
