= USS Hawk (IX-14) =

Patrol vessel of the United States Navy

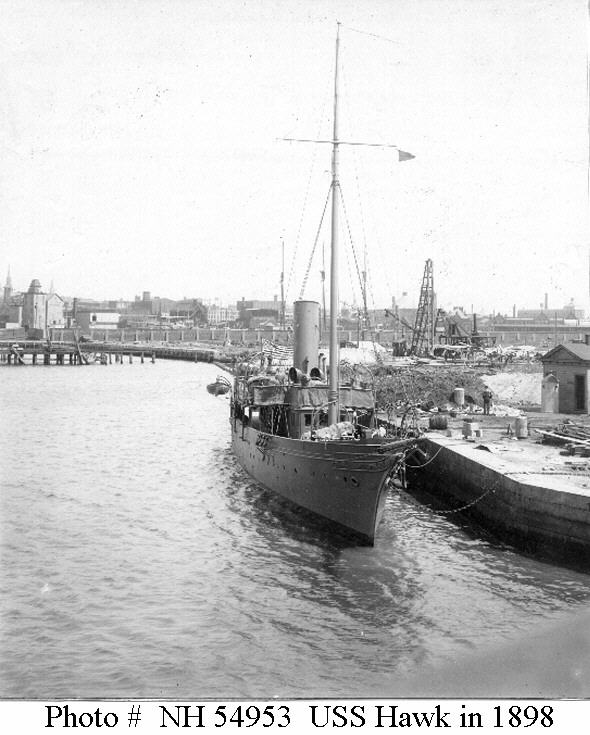

History

United States
- Name: USS Hawk
- Builder: Fleming & Ferguson, Paisley, Scotland
- Launched: 1891
- Acquired: 2 April 1898
- Commissioned: 5 April 1898
- Decommissioned: 14 September 1898
- Recommissioned: 1900
- Decommissioned: 21 May 1919
- Reclassified: PY-2 (Patrol Yacht), 1920; IX-14 (Unclassified Miscellaneous Auxiliary), 1 July 1921
- Recommissioned: 16 April 1922
- Decommissioned: 14 February 1940
- Fate: Sold for scrap, 25 February 1940

General characteristics
- Displacement: 545 long tons (554 t)
- Length: 145 ft (44 m)
- Beam: 22 ft (6.7 m)
- Draft: 11 ft (3.4 m)
- Speed: 14 knots (26 km/h; 16 mph)
- Complement: 47 officers and enlisted
- Armament: 1 × 3-pounder gun; 2 × 1-pounder guns

USS Hawk (PY-2/IX-14) was the converted British-built civilian yacht Hermione of 1891, acquired for service as a patrol yacht in the Spanish–American War. She later served in the Ohio and New York naval militias and on the Great Lakes until decommissioned in 1940.

== Civilian yacht ==
The steam yacht Hermione was designed by Glasgow naval architect George L. Watson and built by Fleming & Ferguson, Paisley, Scotland, in 1891 for James and Richard Allan of the Allen Line, Glasgow. In June 1895 she was chartered to the American businessman Robert Goelet. The yacht was later sold to the American politician and manufacturer, Henry L. Pierce.

== Spanish–American War ==
Hermione was purchased by the United States Navy on 2 April 1898, renamed Hawk, and commissioned three days later, Lt. John Hood in command. She sailed from Key West in late April 1898 to join the North Atlantic Squadron in blockading Cuba during the Spanish–American War. On 23 May she accompanied Admiral Sampson's flagship New York (ACR-2) out from Key West. Two weeks later she attacked and destroyed enemy ship Alphonso XII, which carried cargo for Cuba. In late summer she departed for Norfolk where she decommissioned on 14 September 1898.

== Naval militia service ==
Recommissioned in 1900, she was loaned to the Ohio Naval Militia where she served for nine years. On 3 August 1909 Hawk was transferred to the Naval Militia of New York, and served for 10 years in the Buffalo area. She decommissioned on 21 May 1919 and joined the Reserve Fleet. After World War I, she was reclassified as PY-2, and again redesignated IX-14 on 1 July 1921.

== Great Lakes ==
Hawk once again recommissioned on 16 April 1922 and was assigned to the 9th Naval District. She operated in the Great Lakes area for the duration of her service. She decommissioned on 14 February 1940 and was sold on 25 February to the Indiana Salvage Co., Michigan City, Indiana.

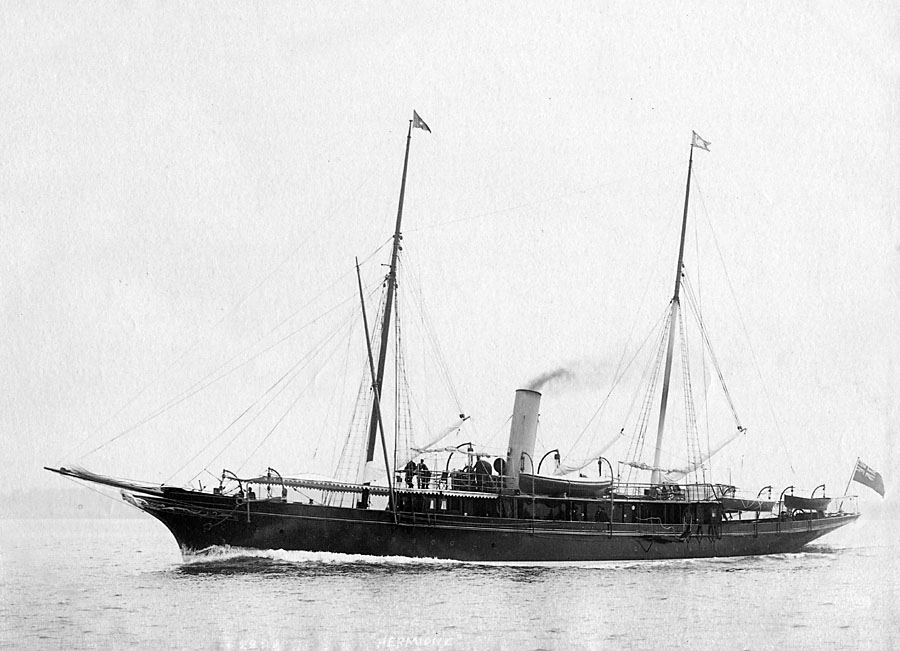
The yacht Hermione, later renamed the USS Hawk, as she appeared in 1895. Photograph by John S. Johnston.
