= Amir-Hossein Khozeimé Alam =

Last ruling Amir of Qaenat and Sistan

Amir Hossein Khozeimé-Alam (c. 1919 – 2002) was the eldest son of Amir Ma'soum Khan Khozeiméh (Hessamodolleh III), the last ruling Amir of Qaenat and Sistan, in what is now south-eastern Iran. He was a cousin of Amir Asadollah Alam and was married to Fatemé Alam, the eldest daughter of Amir Ebrahim Alam (Shokat ol-molk II), who was also his great-uncle.

Subsequently, he became Under-secretary for Agriculture in Tehran. Hussein and Fateme had two sons and two daughters, of whom the eldest is married to the British politician Lord Temple-Morris. After the Iranian revolution, Khozeimé-Alam fled into exile in London where he was a leading figure in the Iranian community.
