= Alban Birch =

16th-century English politician

Alban Birch (by 1526–1599?), of Leominster, Herefordshire, was an English politician.

He was a member (MP) of the parliament of England for Leominster in 1558.
