= Nancy Seear, Baroness Seear =

British politician (1913–1997)

The Right Honourable The Baroness Seear PC
- Seear in Parliament in 1985

Leader of the Liberal Party in the House of Lords
- In office 1984–1988
- Preceded by: The Lord Byers
- Succeeded by: Office abolished

Personal details
- Born: 7 August 1913
- Died: 23 April 1997 (aged 83)

Beatrice Nancy Seear, Baroness Seear PC (7 August 1913 – 23 April 1997) was a British social scientist and politician. She was leader of the Liberal Party in the House of Lords from 1984 to 1988, and Deputy Leader of the Liberal Democrats in the House of Lords from 1988 to 1997. She was also appointed a Privy Counsellor in 1985.

== Career ==
Born in Epsom, Surrey, Seear was educated at Croydon High School, Newnham College, Cambridge, and the London School of Economics. She became Personnel Officer at C & J Clark Ltd in 1935, staying until 1946. During this period she was seconded as a part-time member of staff at the Production Efficiency Board for the Ministry of Aircraft Production, a post she held from 1943 to 1945.

In 1946, she became a teacher of, and reader in, Personnel Management at the London School of Economics, where she would remain until 1978.

As a member of the Liberal Party, Seear contested every UK general election from 1950 to 1970, coming third behind the Conservative and Labour candidates on each occasion. She initially stood for Hornchurch in 1950 and 1951, before attempting Truro in 1955 and 1959. In 1964, she stood for Epping, and tried constituencies in northern England at the following two general elections – Rochdale, in 1966, and Wakefield in 1970. The latter would be her last candidature at a general election, although she stood as the Liberal candidate for Wight and Hampshire East in the 1979 European Parliament election, coming second to the Conservative candidate.

Seear was President of the Liberal Party from 1964 to 1965, and of the Fawcett Society from 1970 to 1985. From 1971 to 1984, she sat on the Top Salaries Review Board. She was created a Life Peer on 18 May 1971 as Baroness Seear, of Paddington in the City of Westminster.

Following her elevation to the House of Lords, she was a Member of the Council at the Industrial Society from 1972 to 1984, and President of the British Standards Institution from 1974 to 1977. She was also President of the Women's Liberal Federation in 1974. From 1975 to 1976, Seear was on the Hansard Social Commission for Electoral Reform, before becoming president at the Institute of Personnel Management, a role she held from 1977 to 1979.

In 1980, she became visiting professor of Personnel Management at City University, London, continuing until 1987. Meanwhile, Seear was Leader of the Liberal Party in the House of Lords from 1984 to 1988 – the year in which the Liberals merged with the Social Democratic Party to form the Liberal Democrats. Seear duly became Deputy Leader of the new Liberal Democrats in the House of Lords, holding this office from 1988 to 1997. From 1991 to 1997, she was also Honorary President of the National Postgraduate Committee.

== Carers champion ==
Baroness Seear was also remembered as a pioneer for carers and women's rights. In 1963, as a Reader in Personnel Management at the LSE, she was approached by the Rev. Mary Webster, who had given up her work as a Minister to care for her aged parents, and hit the UK headlines with her highly effective campaigning work. Seear said that within five minutes of meeting Mary Webster, "I knew that she was someone quite exceptional".

Seear became one of twelve founder members of the NCSWD – the National Council for Single Woman and Her Dependants – on 15 December 1965; another prominent member was Sir Keith Joseph. She continued working for the movement and eventually became a Patron of the Carers National Association, when it was formed by a merger with the Association of Carers on 14 May 1988.

== Personal life ==
Seear was a Christian. She was unmarried, and stated herself to be a republican. She died from cancer in London on 23 April 1997, aged 83.

== Archives ==
- Papers of Baroness Beatrice Nancy Seear are held at The Women's Library at the Library of the London School of Economics, ref 7BNS
- Catalogue of the papers of Baroness Seear held at LSE Archives

== Publications ==
- A career for women in industry (Oliver and Boyd, Edinburgh, 1964);
- Policies for incomes (Liberal Publication Department, London, 1967);
- Training: the fulcrum of change (British Association for Commercial and Industrial Education, London, 1976);
- Interdependence and survival: population policies and environmental control (Wyndham Place Trust, London, 1976);
- Women in the penal system (Report for the Howard League for Penal Reform, 1986);
- Education: a quantum leap? (Hebden Royd Publications, Hebden Bridge, 1988).

Party political offices
Preceded by Roger Fulford	President of the Liberal Party; 1965–1966	Succeeded by The Lord Eden
Preceded by Joyce Rose	President of the Women's Liberal Federation; 1974–1977	Succeeded by Nelia Penman
Preceded by The Lord Byers	Leader of the Liberals in the House of Lords; 1984–1988	Succeeded by Roy Jenkins; Leader of the Social and Liberal Democrats
