= Roger Pincham =

Roger James Pincham CBE (born 28 October 1935) is a former British Liberal Party politician.

Pincham studied at Wimbledon Park School and Kingston Grammar School before becoming a stockbroker. He stood as the Liberal Party candidate for Leominster at each election from 1970 to 1983, coming only 579 votes, less than 2%, away from victory in October 1974. Leominster has otherwise been a safe Conservative seat with no other Liberal candidate since 1906 polling within 10% of the Tory vote. In a 2001 article in Liberator Roger Pincham is included in an informal shortlist of four most compelling Liberal orators of the latter decades of the 20th century.

In 1973, Pincham founded the Gladstone Club which meets at the National Liberal Club and continues to enjoy an active membership. In connection with this he contributed the biography of William Ewart Gladstone for the Liberal Democrat History Group site. From 1975 until 2007, he was Chair of the Board of Governors of St James Independent Schools, which are closely linked with the School of Economic Science.

Pincham served as Chairman of the Liberal Party from 1979 to 1982. He was appointed a Commander of the Order of the British Empire (CBE) in the 1982 Birthday Honours for political service. In 1985, he became Chairman of the Lloyd George Society. A classical liberal in the Gladstonian tradition, Pincham is generally on the right of his party; he has long been an advocate of a land value tax to mitigate other forms of taxation.

Although less politically active, he continues to support the Liberal Democrats, successors of the Liberal Party. In retirement he lives in Snape, Suffolk.

Party political offices
Preceded by Geoff Tordoff	Chairman of the Liberal Party; 1979–1983	Succeeded by Joyce Rose
