= Charles Ward-Jackson =

British politician

Major Charles Lionel Atkins Ward-Jackson (1869 – 28 April 1930) was an early 20th century British Conservative Party member of parliament.

== Early life ==
Ward-Jackson was born in 1869, the son of a Church of England clergyman. He received his formal education at Eton College.

== Military career ==
Ward-Jackson served in the 3rd Yorkshire Regiment from 1891, and was appointed a lieutenant in the Yorkshire Hussars (a Yeomanry regiment) on 26 May 1897. Following the outbreak of the Second Boer War in late 1899, he volunteered for active service and was seconded to the Imperial Yeomanry on 24 February 1900, where he was appointed a lieutenant in the 66th Company of the 16th Battalion. The company left for South Africa in the middle of March 1900. He was twice mentioned in dispatches. He relinquished his commission in the Imperial Yeomanry in late August 1901, and was granted the honorary rank of captain in the army. Following his return to the United Kingdom, he was on 21 May 1902 appointed captain in the Yorkshire Hussars. He resigned from the British Army in 1907 with the intention of entering the House of Commons as a Member of Parliament, but having failed to be elected after contesting Manchester South as a Unionist in 1910 General Election, he rejoined the army in 1914 on the outbreak of World War I, and served with the Yorkshire Hussars in France, and as a General Staff Officer.

== Political career ==
In the 1918 General Election he was elected as a coalition Conservative candidate for the Leominster, and held the seat until the 1922 election, when he transferred to the Harrow in Middlesex, where he stood as the official Conservative candidate. The former Conservative Member of Parliament, Sir Oswald Mosley, Bt., ran as an Independent, defeating Ward-Jackson for the seat. During the campaign, Ward-Jackson denounced Mosley's criticisms of the actions of British forces in Ireland policing against the paramilitary activities of Republican revolutionaries, and also accused him of inciting Indian students in Cambridge University to rebel against the existence of the British Raj. Mosley sued Ward-Jackson for defamation, winning a retraction as well as his legal costs of £200.

Parliament of the United Kingdom
| Preceded by H. FitzHerbert Wright | Member of Parliament for Leominster; 1918–1922 | Succeeded by Sir Ernest Shepperson |
