= Ernest Shepperson =

British politician (1874–1949)

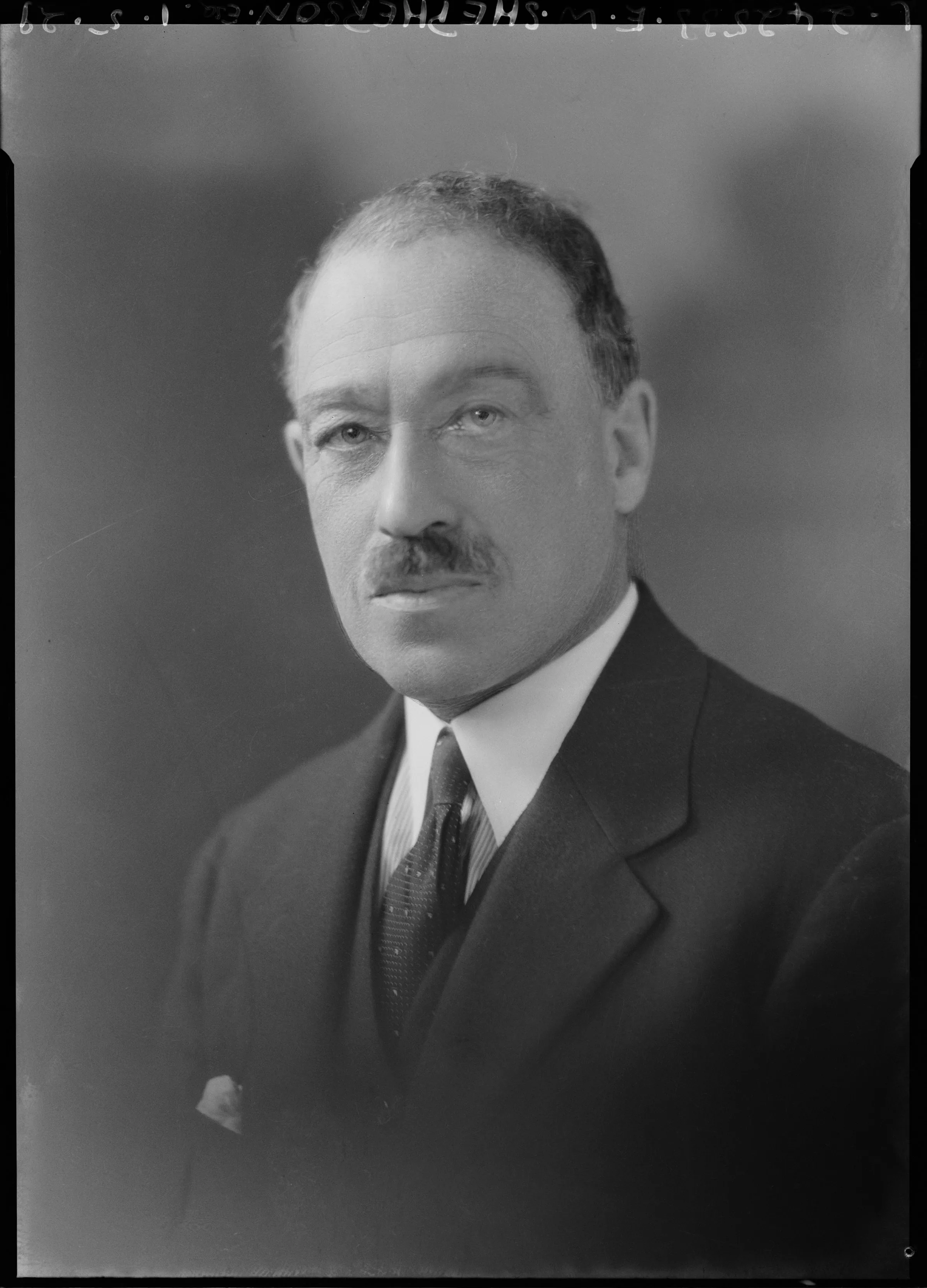
Shepperson in 1929

Sir Ernest Whittome Shepperson, 1st Baronet (4 October 1874 – 22 August 1949) was a Conservative Party politician who was Member of Parliament (MP) for Leominster from 1922 to 1945.

== Early life and career ==
Shepperson was born in Ramsey, Huntingdonshire, and grew up in the village of Benwick in the Isle of Ely. He entered Christ's College, Cambridge in 1898, graduating with a BA with honours in 1901 and an LLB in 1902. He proceeded to the MA degree in 1909. While at Cambridge, Shepperson participated in experiments applying science to agriculture, helping to develop new varieties of wheat, potatoes and other crops. He was secretary of the Cambridge University Speed Skating Club from 1899 to 1901 and finished second in the English Amateur Skating Championship.

Called to the bar at Gray's Inn in 1908, he thereafter served on the South Eastern Circuit. His legal practice principally concerned agricultural cases. In 1910 he was made a Justice of the Peace for the Isle of Ely. By 1910, he was a Middle Level Commissioner, clerk to the White Fen District Commissioners, and a member of Benwick's parish council and school managers. Shepperson became a member of Isle of Ely County Council in 1914. He was also the honorary secretary of the Benwick branch of the Unionist Association and gave lectures on tariff reform in North Cambridgeshire.

Shepperson was involved with the National Farmers' Union by January 1914, when he addressed the first annual meeting and dinner of its March branch on the relationship between politics and farming.

During the First World War, Shepperson volunteered for service on 5 October 1914. He was not accepted for combatant military service, but was appointed an honorary recruiting officer and military representative for the Eastern Area, with the rank of captain. On 9 January 1917, he was commissioned as a temporary second lieutenant in the 3rd Battalion, Cambridgeshire Volunteer Regiment. Shepperson had previously served for five years in the Buckinghamshire Yeomanry under Lord Chesham.

In 1939, Shepperson was appointed chairman of the Isle of Ely Quarter Sessions, succeeding Judge Farrant after serving as deputy chairman for several years.

== Parliamentary career ==
In June 1921, Shepperson was selected as the prospective Conservative candidate for Leominster. At that time, he lived at Keyworth House, Benwick, and farmed more than 1,000 acres. Shepperson was elected Member of Parliament (MP) for Leominster in the 1922 general election as a member of the Conservative Party. By the time of his election, Shepperson was serving on the council of the National Farmers' Union, which officially supported his candidacy. A contemporary report identified him as the first member of the union's council elected to the House of Commons. Addressing the council after his election, he stated that his principal parliamentary aim would be to represent agricultural interests. After entering Parliament, he gave up his legal practice while continuing to farm.

Agriculture was a principal focus of his parliamentary work. In January 1930, Shepperson supported additional expenditure on the sugar-beet subsidy, arguing that it had saved arable farmers from financial ruin during a period of low crop prices. During debates on the Import Duties Act 1932, he argued that imported meat should be taxed "in the interests of agriculture".

In February 1936, Shepperson supported the Unemployment Insurance (Agriculture) Bill, but called for a larger State contribution and lower contributions from employers and employees. He also sought more favourable treatment for permanently employed labourers, expressing concern that their contributions would subsidise casual workers whom he described as earning higher wages when employed.

In November 1938, he urged the Government to extend the Wheat Act's system of guaranteed prices, financed through a levy and subsidy, to other agricultural commodities.

In July 1943, Shepperson advocated retaining the Ministry of Food after the war to purchase British agricultural produce at agreed prices and pool it with imports for sale to consumers. Acknowledging his previous opposition to such policies, he nevertheless argued that state involvement should preserve farmers' initiative and independence in managing their land.

In a letter dated 9 February 1942, Shepperson announced that he would not seek re-election at the next general election, stating that responsibility for post-war reconstruction should pass to a younger generation. He retired from Parliament in 1945.

== Personal life and honours ==
Shepperson was knighted as part of the 1929 Dissolution Honours. He was made a baronet in the 1945 Dissolution Honours. The title became extinct on his death.

In 1916, he married Doris Ambrose, daughter of Cole Ambrose of Stuntney Hall, near Ely. They had two daughters. By 1942, he had moved to Upwood House and was farming more than 3,000 acres.

Shepperson died on 22 August 1949 at his home in Upwood, Huntingdonshire.

Parliament of the United Kingdom
Preceded by Charles Ward-Jackson	Member of Parliament for Leominster; 1922–1945	Succeeded by Archer Baldwin
Baronetage of the United Kingdom
New creation	Baronet (of Upwood); 1945–1949	Extinct
