= Lloyd George Society =

The Lloyd George Society is an organisation connected with, but not formally affiliated to, the Liberal Democrats. It is named after David Lloyd George, the Welsh Liberal politician who was British prime minister from 1916–1922.

The society was founded in the late 1950s by Liberals in Wales when it was known as the Welsh Liberal Weekend Schools. It met, usually at a hotel in Mid Wales, once a year to discuss topical political and social questions both domestic and foreign, with invited specialist guest speakers. A favourite location has been the Abernant Lake Hotel at Llanwrtyd Wells because this was one of the Spa towns at which Lloyd George used to spend time. Its main purpose at that time was to provide Liberal parliamentary candidates with an environment in which they could learn about the issues of the day, debate them with experts and so gain in experience and self-assurance better to equip them for the pressures of fighting general elections.

By the mid-1980s, with the development of the Liberal-SDP Alliance, the name Welsh Liberal Weekend Schools was discarded and the group became known as the Lloyd George Society. The founding members included Emlyn Hooson who was Liberal MP for Montgomeryshire from 1962–1979 and Tom Ellis of the SDP. The first chairman was Roger Pincham, former chairman of the Liberal Party. It has continued to meet annually in Wales with expert speakers invited to talk on topical issues but over the years it has stopped being a training school for Liberal candidates and has now opened its doors to an audience who have an interest in Welsh affairs, society and culture as well as the wider British political scene. The society also promotes an interest in the life, career and family of David Lloyd George.

At the meeting of the society in Llandrindod Wells in February 2009, Jennifer Longford, the daughter of Frances Stevenson, Lloyd George's longtime mistress and his second wife, was elected as a vice-president of the society.

== See also ==
- Politics of the United Kingdom
