= Hugh Aston (fl. 1390) =

English politician (fl. 1390)

Hugh Aston of Leominster, Herefordshire was an English politician. He sat as MP for Leominster in January 1390.

Before September 1384, he married Alice.

He was related to John Aston and Walter Aston. In 1384, Hugh and his wife conveyed a toft, 45 acres of arable land and two acres of meadow in Conhope to Robert Vykers of Aymestrey.
