= North Herefordshire =

UK Parliament constituency (since 2010)

Coordinates: 52.2°N 2.7°W

- County constituency for the House of Commons
- Boundaries since 2024
- Boundary of North Herefordshire in West Midlands region
- County: Herefordshire
- Electorate: 70,894 (2023)
- Major settlements: Bromyard, Kington, Ledbury and Leominster

Current constituency
- Created: 2010
- Member of Parliament: Ellie Chowns (Greens)
- Seats: One
- Created from: Leominster

North Herefordshire is a constituency (Note: A county constituency (for the purposes of election expenses and type of returning officer)) represented in the House of Commons of the UK Parliament since 2024 by Ellie Chowns of the Green Party of England and Wales. (Note: As with all constituencies, the constituency elects one Member of Parliament (MP) by the first past the post system of election at least every five years.) It is the first Green seat in the West Midlands region.

== Constituency profile ==
North Herefordshire is a constituency in Herefordshire in the West Midlands region of England. Its largest town is Leominster, which has a population of around 11,000. Other settlements include the towns of Ledbury, Bromyard and Kington, the villages of Credenhill and Colwall and the Hereford suburb of Holmer.

North Herefordshire is a large, rural and sparsely-populated constituency. Fruit and cider production are important local industries and the constituency contains many historic market towns and small villages. There is some deprivation in Leominster and the rural villages, whilst Ledbury and the areas close to Hereford are affluent, giving the constituency an overall average level of wealth. House prices here are generally similar to the national average and higher than the rest of the West Midlands.

North Herefordshire has a large retired population and a low proportion of young adults; 30% of residents are over the age of 65. In general, residents have average levels of education, above-average rates of homeownership and are more likely to be religious compared to the rest of the country. Average household income and the child poverty rate are in line with nationwide figures. A high proportion of residents work in the agriculture, manufacturing an retail sectors and the percentage claiming unemployment benefits is low. White people made up 98% of the population at the 2021 census.

At the local county council, most of the constituency is represented by Conservatives with some Green Party councillors in Leominster and Ledbury. An estimated 57% of voters in North Herefordshire supported leaving the European Union in the 2016 referendum, higher than the UK-wide figure of 52%.

== Boundaries ==
=== 2010–2024 ===
This constituency contains a northern and central part of Herefordshire, including the towns of Bromyard, Kington, Ledbury and Leominster.

The constituency was defined as comprising the following electoral wards:

- Backbury, Bircher, Bringsty, Bromyard, Burghill, Holmer and Lyde, Castle, Credenhill, Frome, Golden Cross with Weobley, Hagley, Hampton Court, Hope End, Kington Town, Ledbury, Leominster North, Leominster South, Mortimer, Old Gore, Pembridge and Lyonshall with Titley, Sutton Walls, Upton, Wormsley Ridge.

=== 2024–present ===
Further to the 2023 Periodic Review of Westminster constituencies which came into effect for the 2024 general election, the constituency is composed of the following:

- The District of Herefordshire wards of: Arrow; Backbury; Bircher; Bishops Frome & Cradley; Bromyard Bringsty; Bromyard West; Castle; Credenhill; Hagley; Hampton; Holmer; Hope End; Kington; Ledbury North; Ledbury South; Ledbury West; Leominster East; Leominster North & Rural; Leominster South; Leominster West; Mortimer; Old Gore; Queenswood; Sutton Walls; Three Crosses; Weobley.

The seat was unchanged, except to align the boundaries with those of revised local authority wards.

The seat includes the village of Weobley, a former borough constituency that was abolished as a 'rotten borough' in 1832.

== Members of Parliament ==
Leominster prior to 2010

Election	Member	Party
2010	Bill Wiggin	Conservative
2024	Ellie Chowns	Green

== History ==
Parliament accepted the Boundary Commission's Fifth Periodic Review of Westminster constituencies which slightly altered this constituency for the 2010 general election to exclude those areas of the former county of Hereford and Worcester which are now in Worcestershire. This meant North Herefordshire being at its core a successor to Leominster constituency. The remainder of the county is covered by the Hereford and South Herefordshire seat.

In the 2024 United Kingdom general election, issues included the NHS, immigration and pollution in the River Wye. The seat was a target for the Greens, who ended up winning the seat.

== Elections ==
=== Elections in the 2020s ===
The 2024 election marked the first time that the Greens had gained a Parliamentary seat directly from the Conservatives.

General election 2024: North Herefordshire
Party	Candidate	Votes	%	±%
Green	Ellie Chowns	21,736	43.2	+34.4
Conservative	Bill Wiggin	15,842	31.5	−31.0
Reform	Andrew Dye	8,048	16.0	N/A
Labour	Jon Browning	3,205	6.4	−8.8
Liberal Democrats	Cat Hornsey	1,436	2.9	−10.6
SDP	Michael Guest	95	0.2	N/A
Majority		5,894	11.7	N/A
Turnout		50,362	71.7	−0.9
Green gain from Conservative		Swing	+32.7	

=== Elections in the 2010s ===
General election 2019: North Herefordshire
Party	Candidate	Votes	%	±%
Conservative	Bill Wiggin	32,158	63.0	+1.0
Liberal Democrats	Phillip Howells	7,302	14.3	+2.6
Labour	Joe Wood	6,804	13.3	−5.6
Green	Ellie Chowns	4,769	9.3	+3.8
Majority		24,856	48.7	+5.6
Turnout		51,033	72.6	−1.5
Conservative hold		Swing	-0.8	

General election 2017: North Herefordshire
Party	Candidate	Votes	%	±%
Conservative	Bill Wiggin	31,097	62.0	+6.4
Labour	Roger Page	9,495	18.9	+7.5
Liberal Democrats	Jeanie Falconer	5,874	11.7	−0.3
Green	Ellie Chowns	2,771	5.5	−1.5
Independent	Sasha Norris	577	1.1	N/A
Independent	Arthur Devine	363	0.7	N/A
Majority		21,602	43.1	+1.5
Turnout		50,177	74.1	+2.1
Conservative hold		Swing	-0.6	

General election 2015: North Herefordshire
Party	Candidate	Votes	%	±%
Conservative	Bill Wiggin	26,716	55.6	−3.8
UKIP	Jonathan Oakton	6,720	14.0	+8.3
Liberal Democrats	Jeanie Falconer	5,768	12.0	−19.0
Labour	Sally Prentice	5,478	11.4	+4.3
Green	Daisy Blench	3,341	7.0	+3.8
Majority		19,996	41.6	+20.8
Turnout		42,545	72.0	+0.5
Conservative hold		Swing		

General election 2010: North Herefordshire
Party	Candidate	Votes	%
Conservative	Bill Wiggin	24,631	51.8
Liberal Democrats	Lucy Hurds	14,744	31.0
Labour	Neil Sabharwal	3,373	7.1
UKIP	Jonathan Oakton	2,701	5.7
Green	Felicity Norman	1,533	3.2
Independent	John King	586	1.2
Majority		9,887	20.8
Turnout		47,568	71.5
Conservative win (new seat)			

== See also ==
- List of parliamentary constituencies in Herefordshire and Worcestershire
- List of parliamentary constituencies in West Midlands (region)
