= Great Southwest Building =

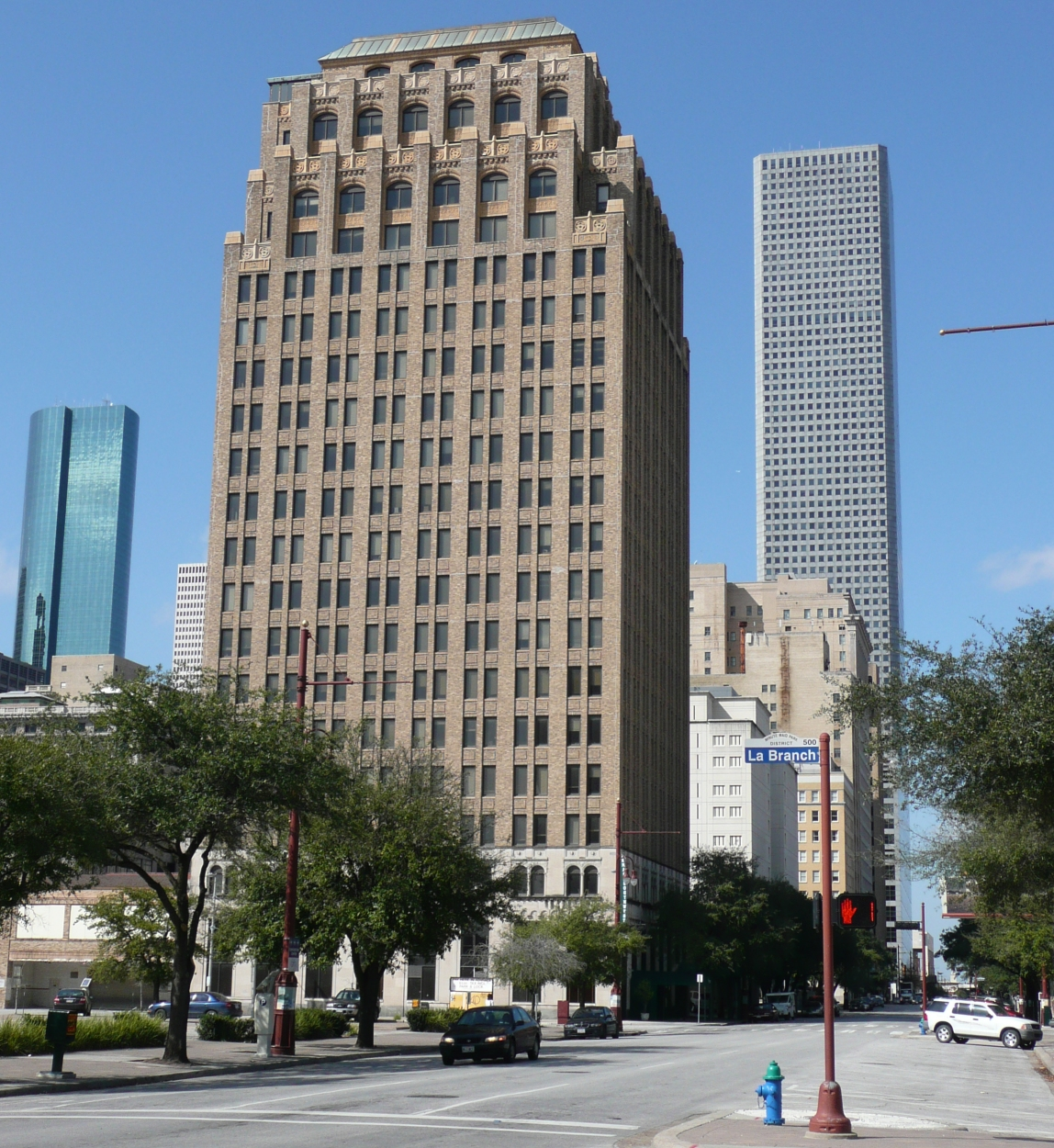
- Great Southwest Building in 2008
- Interactive map of the Great Southwest Building area

General information
- Status: Completed
- Type: Office
- Architectural style: Art Deco
- Location: 1314 Texas Avenue; Houston, Texas, United States
- Coordinates: 29.7584396°N 95.3682630°W
- Completed: 1926; 100 years ago
- Opening: 1927; 99 years ago

Height
- Roof: 291 ft (89 m)

Technical details
- Floor count: 22
- Floor area: 188,240 ft^{2} (17,490 m^{2})

Design and construction
- Architects: Alfred C. Bossom, Maurice J. Sullivan, and Briscoe & Dixon
- Developer: Joseph S. Cullinan founder of The Texas Company
- Petroleum Building
- U.S. National Register of Historic Places
- NRHP reference No.: 100004250
- Added to NRHP: August 8, 2019

The Great Southwest Building, formerly the Petroleum Building and the Great Southwest Life Building, is a historic commercial skyscraper located at 1314 Texas Avenue in Downtown Houston, Texas, United States. Originally built in 1927 as an office space for The Texas Company (now Texaco), the building is now the site of the Cambria Hotel Houston Downtown Convention Center. It was listed on the National Register of Historic Places on August 8, 2019, for its historical and architectural significance.

== History ==
The structure was originally commissioned by Joseph S. Cullinan, founder of The Texas Company. As a result of the Texas oil boom, Cullinan envisioned a single skyscraper that would house offices for booming oil and gas companies across Texas, which would operate under one name as the American Republics Corporation. On May 25, 1925, he established the Petroleum Building Company, a holding company overseen by oil businessman and founder of Fidelity Securities Company Thomas Peter Lee. Construction was completed in 1927.

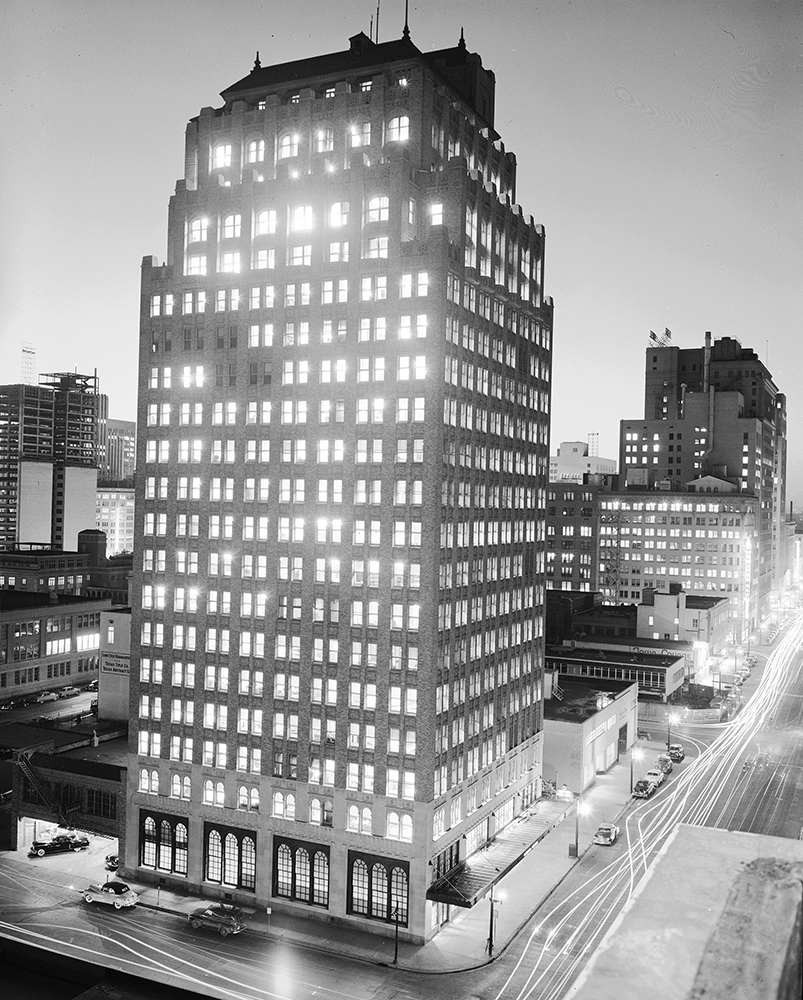
The Petroleum Building in 1951

The Petroleum Building also became a hub of social life for the oil and business magnates and their families. From 1929 until 1973, the Tejas Club hosted meetings on the top floor, which had originally been a cafeteria for The Texas Company. The club capped itself at 50 members, required a join and membership fee, and heralded itself as pursuing "the maintenance of comfortable quarters for the association of mutually agreeable personnel; the pursuit and furtherance of... literary and artistic undertakings... and the study and preservation of the historic traditions of Texas."

After Texaco relocated to larger offices, the building continued to serve smaller oil and gas companies on upper floors and retail outlets on the ground floor. In 1980, the Great Southwest Life Insurance Company became the new tenants of the building and subsequently changed its name.

== Tenants ==
In the first decades of the building, several companies--mostly oil and gas or financial companies--had offices inside the building. These included:

- American Republics Corporation, a holding firm that consolidated American Petroleum Company, Intracoastal Towing and Transportation Company, Federal Petroleum Company, Fidelity Securities Company, Galena-Signal Oil Company, Papoose Oil Company, Petroleum Coal and Iron Company, Pennsylvania Car Company, Pennsylvania Petroleum Company, Pennsylvania Shipyards, Pennsylvania Tank Line, Petroleum Iron Works Company, Pueblo Oil Company, and Republic Production Company
- Fidelity Trust Company (1927-1951)
- Halliburton
- Houston Natural Gas

In 2015, a Dallas-based developer, Todd Interests, purchased the structure with plans to renovate the building and create 150 luxury apartment units. The project was slated to receive a 15,000 tax credit per unit from the Houston Downtown Living Initiative, a program designed to encourage residential development in the city center. However, in 2016, the building was sold to Choice Hotels International. The building reopened as the Cambria Hotel Houston Downtown Convention Center on August 1, 2019.

== Architecture ==
Designed by New York City-based architect Alfred Bossom with associate Houston architects Maurice J. Sullivan and Briscoe & Dixon, the building features Art Deco styling with unusual Maya architecture and Spanish Colonial Revival touches. Bossom had taken a trip to Central America just prior to beginning work on the Petroleum Building and had been specifically inspired by the pyramids at Tikal, Guatemala. These feature include decorative reliefs, most of which occur at the base and cornice, and a stepped-back style on the upper floors to mimic a Mayan pyramid. Additionally, this stepped-back shape, as Cullinan saw it, was the answer to questions about how to join the skyscraper and its surrounding landscape and how to increase natural light at street level. His design—as well as at least one other stepped-back skyscraper being built contemporarily in New York City, the Barclay–Vesey Building—influenced several other buildings in downtown Houston, such as the JPMorgan Chase Building and the Niels Esperson Building. This Mayan-influenced design would be re-imagined 50 years later with the similarly-styled Heritage Plaza building finished in 1987.

The building itself occupies a square footprint and spans 21 floors. Its facade is brick cladding set over a concrete-clad steel frame, on top of a granite and limestone base. The inclusion of a two-story parking garage made the Petroleum Building the first known skyscraper to incorporate built-in above-ground parking into its original construction.

== See also ==
- Heritage Plaza
