= George Arkwright =

English politician (1807–1856)

George Arkwright (20 August 1807 – 5 February 1856) was an English Conservative Party politician. He was a Member of Parliament (MP) for Leominster from 1842 until his death in 1856.

Arkwright was born in Bakewell, Derbyshire, the great-grandson of Sir Richard Arkwright. He was educated at Eton and Trinity College, Cambridge, receiving his B.A. in 1830 and his M.A. in 1833. He was called to the bar from Lincoln's Inn in 1833. At the 1837 general election Arkwright stood unsuccessfully for a seat in Parliament from Northern Derbyshire, but he was elected unopposed in Leominster at a by-election in February 1842. He died aged 48 in Piccadilly.

== Sources ==
- Gentleman's Magazine obituary

Parliament of the United Kingdom
| Preceded by James Wigram; Charles Greenaway | Member of Parliament for Leominster; 1842–1856; With: Charles Greenaway to 1845; Sir Henry Barkly 1845–1849; Frederick Peel 1849–1852; John George Phillimore from 1842 | Succeeded by Gathorne Gathorne-Hardy; John George Phillimore |
