= Virginia Mutual Building =

Historic commercial building in Virginia, United States

- U.S. National Register of Historic Places
- Virginia Landmarks Register
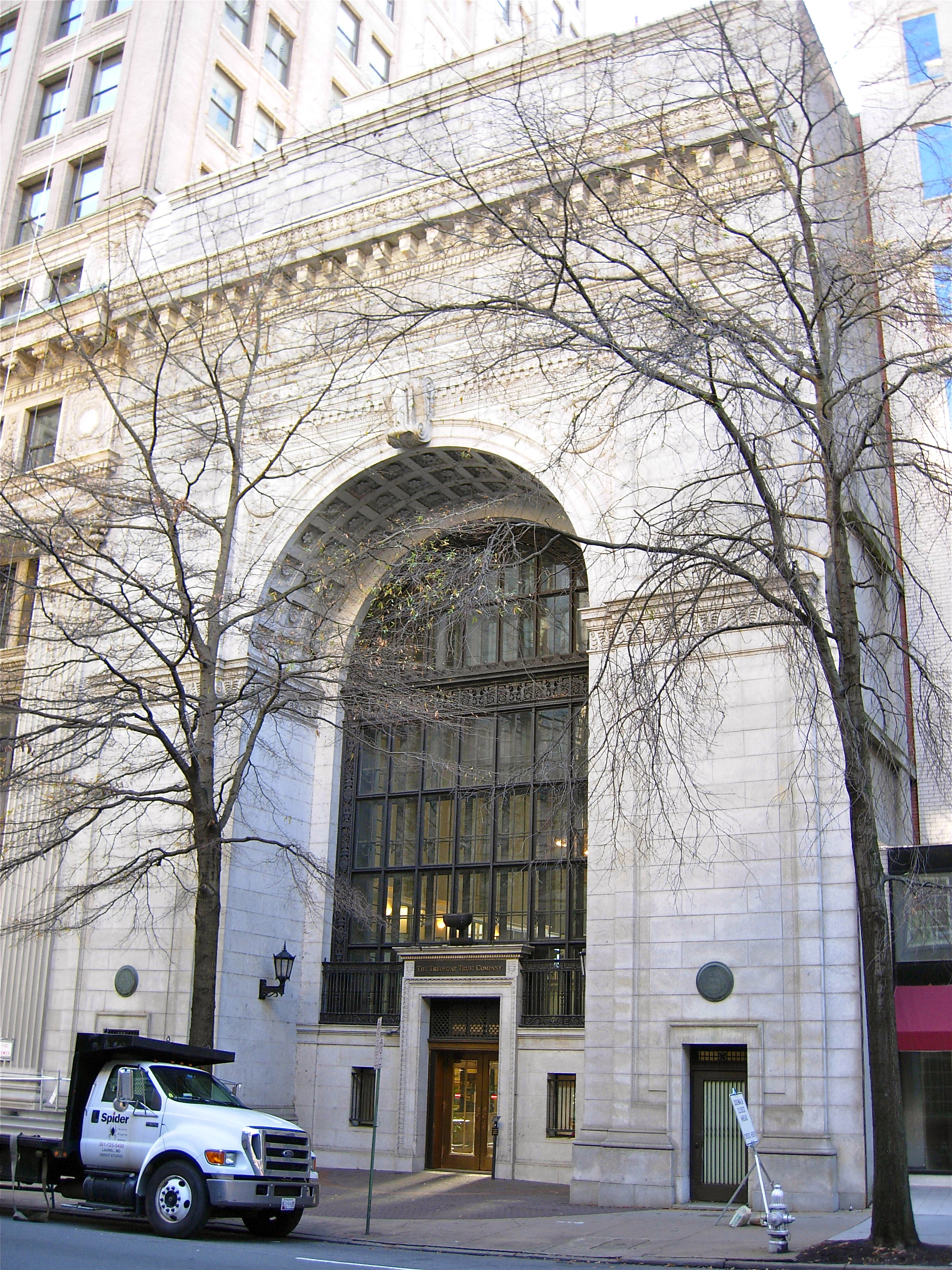
- Virginia Mutual Building, January 2012

- Location within Virginia Location within the United States
- Location: 821 E. Main St., Richmond, Virginia
- Coordinates: 37°32′17″N 77°26′13″W
- Area: less than one acre
- Built: 1920-1921
- Architect: Bossom, Alfred Charles
- Architectural style: Classical Revival
- NRHP reference No.: 77001537
- VLR No.: 127-0249

Significant dates
- Added to NRHP: November 7, 1977
- Designated VLR: February 15, 1977

Virginia Mutual Building, also known as the Virginia Trust Company Building, is a historic bank building located in Richmond, Virginia. It was designed by architect Alfred Bossom and built in 1920–1921. It is a six level, Classical Revival style building constructed of white granite with terra cotta ornament. The front facade is in the form of a Roman triumphal arch, reminiscent of the Arch of Titus, with an overall height of 91 feet. The building is occupied by the Tredegar Trust Company.

It was listed on the National Register of Historic Places in 1977.
