= John Creswell (MP) =

English politician

John Creswell (fl. 1597) was an English politician.

He was the deputy Recorder for the town of Leominster in Herefordshire. In 1597 he was elected member (MP) of the parliament of England for the borough.
