= John Morgan (MP for Leominster) =

English politician

John Moore (died by 28 January 1572) was an English politician.

He was a member (MP) of the parliament of England for Leominster in 1563.
