= Peter Temple-Morris =

British politician

The Right Honourable The Lord Temple-Morris

Member of the House of Lords
- Lord Temporal
- Life peerage 22 June 2001 – 1 May 2018

Member of Parliament for Leominster
- In office 28 February 1974 – 14 May 2001
- Preceded by: Sir Clive Bossom
- Succeeded by: Bill Wiggin

Personal details
- Born: 12 February 1938 Cardiff, Wales
- Died: 1 May 2018 (aged 80) London, England
- Party: Conservative (until 1997); Independent (1997–1998); Labour (from 1998)
- Spouse: Taheré Khozeimé-Alam (m. 1964)
- Relations: Owen Temple-Morris (father)
- Children: 4
- Education: St Catharine's College, Cambridge

Peter Temple-Morris, Baron Temple-Morris (12 February 1938 – 1 May 2018) was a British politician. He was elected as the Conservative Member of Parliament (MP) for Leominster in 1974; he stood down in 2001 after changing parties. He sat in the House of Lords as a Labour peer.

== Early life ==
Born in Cardiff, Temple-Morris attended Llandaff Cathedral School and Hillstone School (Malvern College's preparatory school) in Malvern, then Malvern College. He went to St Catharine's College, Cambridge, gaining a BA in Law in 1958. He became a barrister, like his father, from 1962 at the Inner Temple, practising until 1989. His family home was in Cardiff, as his father Sir Owen Temple-Morris was MP for Cardiff East.

== Parliamentary career ==
Temple-Morris was selected as the Conservative candidate for Newport (Monmouthshire) in 1964 and 1966 and Norwood in 1970. In February 1974, he was elected for Leominster, having been selected for the seat in March 1973. That same year, he was appointed vice-chairman, Commonwealth Parliamentary Association (UK Branch). In 1979, he was appointed Parliamentary Private Secretary to the Minister of Transport, Norman Fowler, Executive Member, Inter-Parliamentary Union (British Group) and Founding Co-Chairman, British-Irish Inter-Parliamentary Body. He was a member of the Select Committees on Agriculture (1982–83) and on Foreign Affairs (1987–90). Temple-Morris was a strong supporter of Michael Heseltine.

=== Crossing the floor ===
Temple-Morris resigned after he was suspended from the Conservative Party in 1997 because Tory officials said he had "repeatedly and publicly questioned his continued commitment to the Conservative Party." Speaking after his resignation, the MP told BBC Radio 5 Live: "I'm not surprised in all the circumstances and not a little bit relieved in view of the unhappy state of politics of the Conservative Party for some years now."

The BBC reported that Conservative leader William Hague's action would be seen as an attempt to deflect attention from disappointing by-election results in Winchester and in Beckenham. As for Temple-Morris, his disaffection toward his old party grew due to their hard-line stance on the euro.

From 1997 to 1998, Temple-Morris sat on the government Labour benches, but did not take the whip, instead sitting as a one-man 'Independent One-Nation Conservative' group. However, on Saturday 20 June 1998 he joined the Labour Party but stood down as an MP at the 2001 general election. He is the only person ever to serve as a Labour MP representing Herefordshire, though he was never elected as a member of that party.

=== House of Lords ===
Temple-Morris was made a life peer on 22 June 2001 as Baron Temple-Morris, of Llandaff in the County of South Glamorgan and of Leominster in the County of Herefordshire. He sat in the House of Lords as a Labour peer.

Outside politics, Temple-Morris was appointed Chairman of the Macleod Group, an association of left-of-centre Conservative MPs, in 1979. In 1995, he became President of the British-Iranian Business Association Society.

Temple-Morris contributed to the book What next for Labour? Ideas for a new generation in September 2011, his piece being entitled "Labour: Progressive Politics".

== Personal life ==
Temple-Morris's father, Owen Temple-Morris, was also a Conservative MP. His son, Eddy Temple-Morris, is a DJ, Virgin Radio presenter, record producer and former MTV presenter.

Temple-Morris married Taheré Khozeimé-Alam (the daughter of Amir-Hossein Khozeimé Alam of Dezashib, Tehran, who fled to London from Iran in 1979) in 1964 in London. The couple had two sons and two daughters. Lady Temple-Morris died in 2025, aged 86.

When he was an MP, Temple-Morris was known for his love of shooting, wine and food.

Temple-Morris died from cancer in London on 1 May 2018, at the age of 80.

Coat of arms of Peter Temple-Morris

Crest
In front of a Representation of Aitoff's Projection of the Globe a Mullet as in the Arms
Escutcheon
Argent in front of Representation of Aitoff's Projection of the Globe Azure the Land Masses Argent a Mullet of four points gyronny of eight Argent and Sable the fesswise points extended on a Chief Argent four Workmen hauling on a rope Argent
Supporters
Dexter: a Surveyor supporting by the exterior hand a Theodolite; Sinister: a Carpenter holding in the exterior hand a Tenon Saw, each wearing a Safety Helmet all proper
Motto
Conjuncti Laboramus

Parliament of the United Kingdom
Preceded by Sir Clive Bossom	Member of Parliament for Leominster; February 1974–2001	Succeeded by Bill Wiggin
