= John Hillesley =

16th-century English politician

John Hillesley (by 1508 – 1566?), of Beenham, Berkshire and Leominster, Herefordshire, was an English politician.

He was a member (MP) of the Parliament of England for Leominster in 1529.

Parliament of England
Preceded by ? ?	Member of Parliament for Leominster; 1529; With: John Bell	Succeeded by ? ?
