= William Colle =

English politician (fl.1397–1414)

William Colle (fl. 1397–1414) of Leominster, Herefordshire, was an English politician.

Colle was a Member of Parliament for the borough of Leominster, first elected in January 1397 with Thomas Reynold. He served until September of that year and was re-elected in November 1414, together with John Salisbury. He was no longer serving by 1416.
