= Edward Croft (MP) =

16th-century English politician

Edward Croft (died 1601), of Croft Castle, Herefordshire, was an English politician.

Croft was the eldest son of Sir James Croft and Alice, daughter of Richard Warnecombe and widow of William Wigmore. He was admitted to the Middle Temple in 1561.

He was a Member (MP) of the Parliament of England for Leominster in 1571, 1584 and 1586. In 1584 and 1586 the other Leominster MP was his half-brother Thomas Wigmore. In 1588, blaming the Earl of Leicester for his father's arrest, Croft was charged with contriving the earl's death through the medium of a London conjuror, but there is no record of any subsequent trial.

He married Anne (d.1575), only daughter and heiress of Thomas Browne of Attleborough, Norfolk. In 1583 the family estates in Herefordshire had been transferred to trustees, suggesting that Croft was considered unreliable. In 1591 he was imprisoned for debt and on his release fled to the Netherlands, where he remarried and settled for the remainder of his life. In 1594 the Croft estates were settled on Herbert.
