= Alfred Bossom =

English-born American architect (1881–1965)

The Right Honourable The Lord Bossom FRIBA
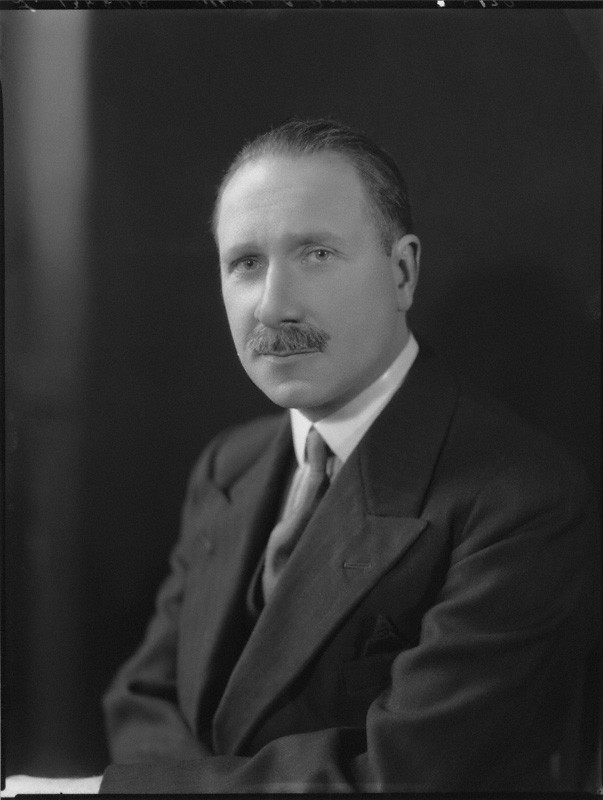
- Bossom in 1929

Member of Parliament for Maidstone
- In office 27 October 1931 – 18 September 1959
- Preceded by: Carlyon Bellairs
- Succeeded by: John Wells

Personal details
- Born: Alfred Charles Bossom; 6 October 1881 Islington, London, England
- Died: 4 September 1965 (aged 83)
- Party: Conservative
- Spouse(s): Emily Bayne (m. 1910; died 1932) Elinor Dittenhofer (m. 1934; div. 1947)
- Children: 3, including Clive
- Education: University of Westminster; Royal Academy of Arts

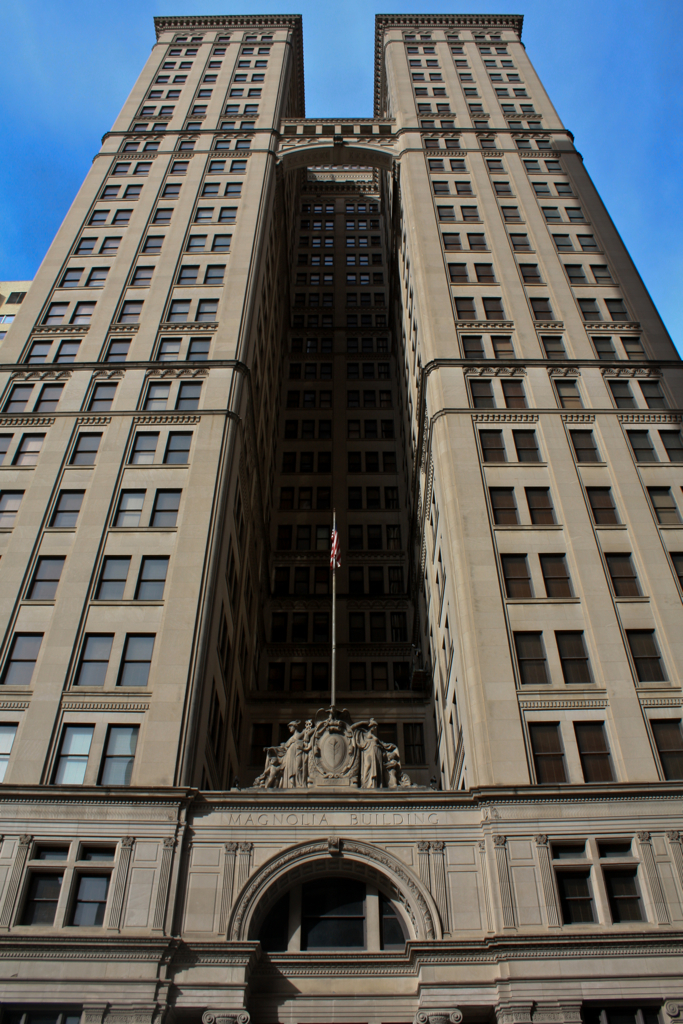
Magnolia Hotel, Dallas, Texas, 1922

Alfred Charles Bossom, Baron Bossom (6 October 1881 – 4 September 1965), was an architect in the United States who returned to his native England and became a Conservative Party politician. He also wrote books on architecture.

== Architectural career ==
Bossom was born in Islington, London, to Alfred Henry Bossom, a stationer, and his wife Amelia Jane, née Hammond. He was educated at St. Thomas's Charterhouse School, in the City, and studied architecture at the Regent Street Polytechnic and the Royal Academy of Arts. In 1904 he left for the United States to work for Carnegie Steel in Pittsburgh, Pennsylvania. He worked on the restoration of Fort Ticonderoga from 1908.

In 1910, he married Emily, daughter of New York City banker, Samuel Bayne, and they had three sons. As an architect with offices at 680 Fifth Avenue, Manhattan, Bossom specialized in the efficient construction of skyscrapers. While based in New York City he designed a number of major works in Texas, including the American Exchange National Bank (1918). Bossom's Dallas work on the Maple Terrace Apartments (1924–1925), and the expansion and renovation of the Adolphus Hotel, were done with local architects Thomson and Swaine. After traveling into Mexico, Bossom became a proponent of Mayan Revival architecture, clearly reflected in the stepped-back tower and ornament of his 1927 Petroleum Building in Houston.

Bossom also designed a number of large houses. Examples include the Henry Devereux Whiton house in Hewlett, New York, additions to the Joseph Wright Harriman house in Brookville, New York, and the remarkable Edward Howland Robinson Green estate in Round Hill, Massachusetts.

He also invented a device for protecting people from suffocating if they accidentally got locked in a bank vault.

A number of architects began their careers in his offices. Samuel Juster and Anthony DePace met in these offices, later founding the firm of DePace and Juster; DePace went from Bossom's skyscraper work to become project manager at Cass Gilbert's offices, project managing the New York Life Building.

== Return to England ==
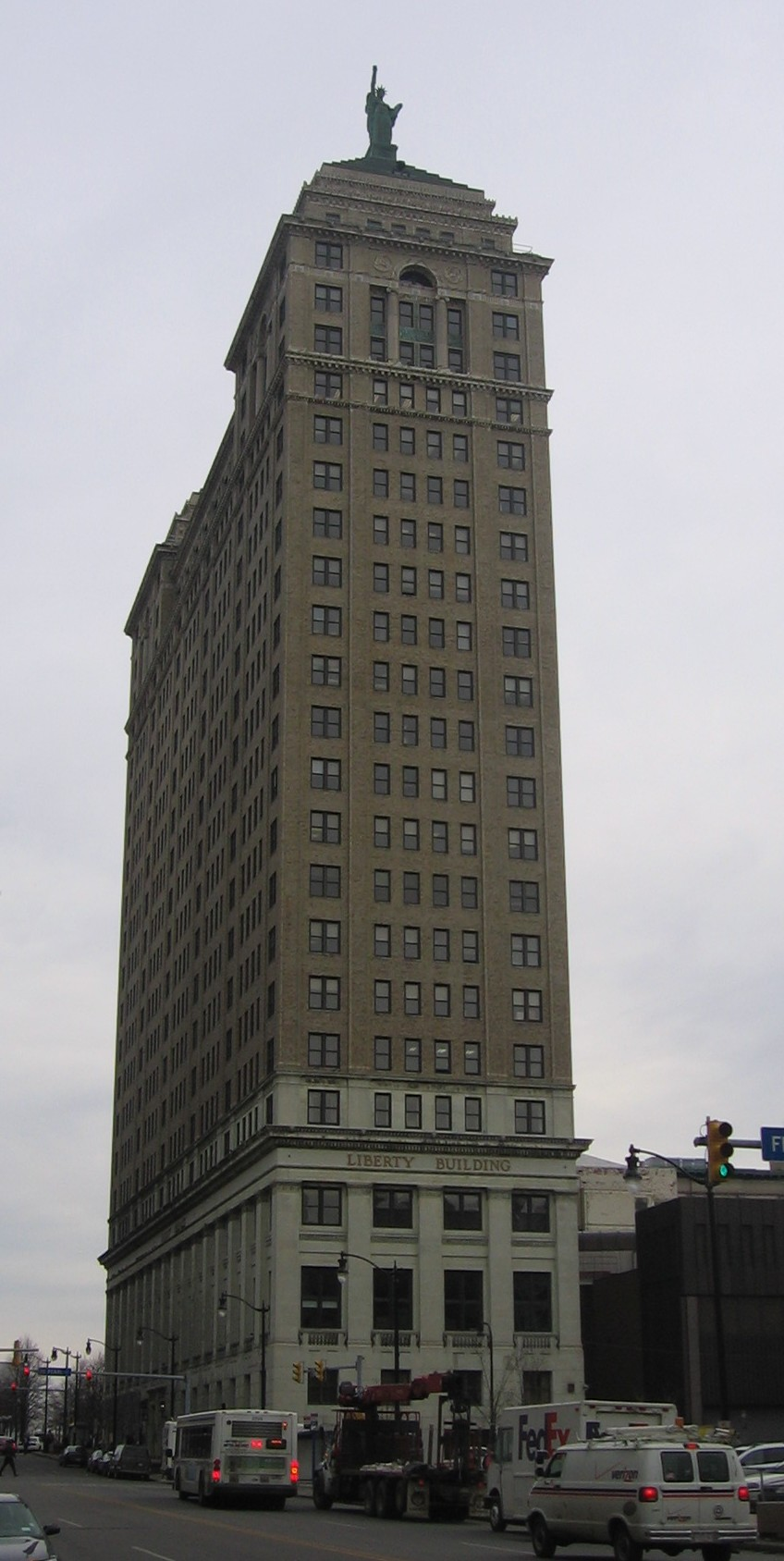
Liberty Building, Buffalo, New York

At the height of his career in 1926, Bossom returned to England with his family, determined that his children should be educated there. Entirely detached from his architectural career, he began a new life of public service and was elected as member of Parliament (MP) for Maidstone at the 1931 general election. He held the seat until he retired from the House of Commons at the 1959 general election, having taken time out during World War II to serve in the British Home Guard. In 1931, Bossom and Mansfield Forbes bought Bourn Windmill, Cambridgeshire. They had the mill repaired, and presented it to the Cambridge Preservation Society in 1932. Later that year, Bossom's wife had died in an aircrash, and he was remarried to another American, Elinor Dittenhofer in 1934, but they were divorced in 1947.

In 1951 he held the reception of Margaret Roberts after her marriage to Denis Thatcher at his Chelsea home; later she became Britain's first female prime minister (1979–1990).

In 1952, he was made an honorary Doctor of Law by the University of Pittsburgh. On 4 July 1953, he was created a baronet, of Maidstone in the County of Kent. On 30 January 1960, he was created a life peer as Baron Bossom, of Maidstone in the County of Kent. In 1965, Bossom died in London, and as his title was a life peerage, it became extinct upon his death, although his hereditary baronetcy passed to his only surviving child, Clive (his eldest and youngest sons had died in 1932 and 1959 respectively).

Bossom was also president of the Anglo-Baltic Society. Winston Churchill joked of him, "Bossom, Bossom, that's an odd name! Neither one thing nor the other", in reference to the words "bosom" and "bottom".

== Architectural designs ==
- Fort Ticonderoga, architect of the first stages of the reconstruction of the French fortress for Col. Robert M Thompson and Mr & Mrs Stephen HP Pell, 1908-1909
- Covington Saving Bank Building, 1910
- First National Bank Building, as designer for Clinton and Russell, Richmond, Virginia, 1912-1913
- American Exchange National Bank (1918)
- Virginia Mutual Building, with local architects Carneal and Johnston, Richmond, Virginia, 1919
- Virginia Trust Company Building in Richmond
- Lynchburg National Bank and Trust at Ninth and Main in Lynchburg
- Edward Howland Robinson Green Mansion, Round Hill, Massachusetts, 1921
- Magnolia Hotel, with local architects Lang & Witchell, Dallas, Texas, 1922
- Maple Terrace Apartments (Dallas, Texas) (1924–25),
- United States National Bank, Galveston, Texas, 1924
- Liberty Building, Buffalo, New York, 1925
- Petroleum Building, Houston, Texas, 1925–26
- Federal-American National Bank, Washington, D.C., 1925–1926
- First National Bank Building, Jersey City, New Jersey, 1920
- Prestwould Apartments, Richmond, Virginia 1929

== Selected works ==
He authored books on architecture including:

- An Architectural Pilgrimage in Old Mexico, Charles Scribner's, 1924.
- Building to the Skies: The Romance of the Skyscraper, 1934.

== Notes ==
Parliament of the United Kingdom
Preceded by Carlyon Bellairs	Member of Parliament for Maidstone; 1931 – 1959	Succeeded by John Wells
Baronetage of the United Kingdom
New creation	Baronet (of Maidstone); 1953 – 1965	Succeeded by Clive Bossom
