= John Hood (inventor) =

John Hood (1720–c.1783) was an Irish surveyor and inventor, born in Moyle, County Donegal.

== Works ==
In 1772 was published in Dublin Hood's Tables of Difference of Latitude and Departure for Navigators, Land Surveyors. In it he recommended that in surveying the bearing of objects should be taken from the meridian of the place. The tables printed in the book are the natural sines of all the angles, in degrees and quarter degrees, to different radii, the latter ranging from 1 to 100, as being best adapted to Gunter's chain.

Hood also gave an account of the diurnal variation of the magnetic needle and its correction, and a description of a new surveying instrument. This invention was elsewhere called Hood's compass theodolite, and is described as the basis of theodolites later used in Britain and America. He is also said to have anticipated the invention of Hadley's quadrant, but took out no patents.
