= Thomas Hakluyt =

16th-century English politician

Thomas Hakluyt (fl. 1559) was an English politician.

He was a member (MP) of the parliament of England for Leominster in 1559.
