= John Hood (15th-century MP) =

English politician

John Hood (fl. 1421–1429), of Leominster, Herefordshire, was an English politician.

He may have been the son of John Hood, MP for Leominster in 1393–1399.

He was a member (MP) of the Parliament of England for Leominster in May 1421 and 1429.
