= William Tiler =

English politician

William Tiler (fl. 1406–1407), of Leominster, Herefordshire, was an English politician.

He was a Member (MP) of the Parliament of England for Leominster in 1406 and 1407.

Parliament of England
Preceded by ? ?	Member of Parliament for Leominster; 1406; With: William Taverner	Succeeded by William Taverner; William Tiler
Parliament of England
Preceded by William Tiler; William Taverner	Member of Parliament for Leominster; 1407; With: William Taverner	Succeeded by Edmund Morris; Walter Borgate
