= John Hood (naval officer) =

United States Navy Admiral (1859–1919)

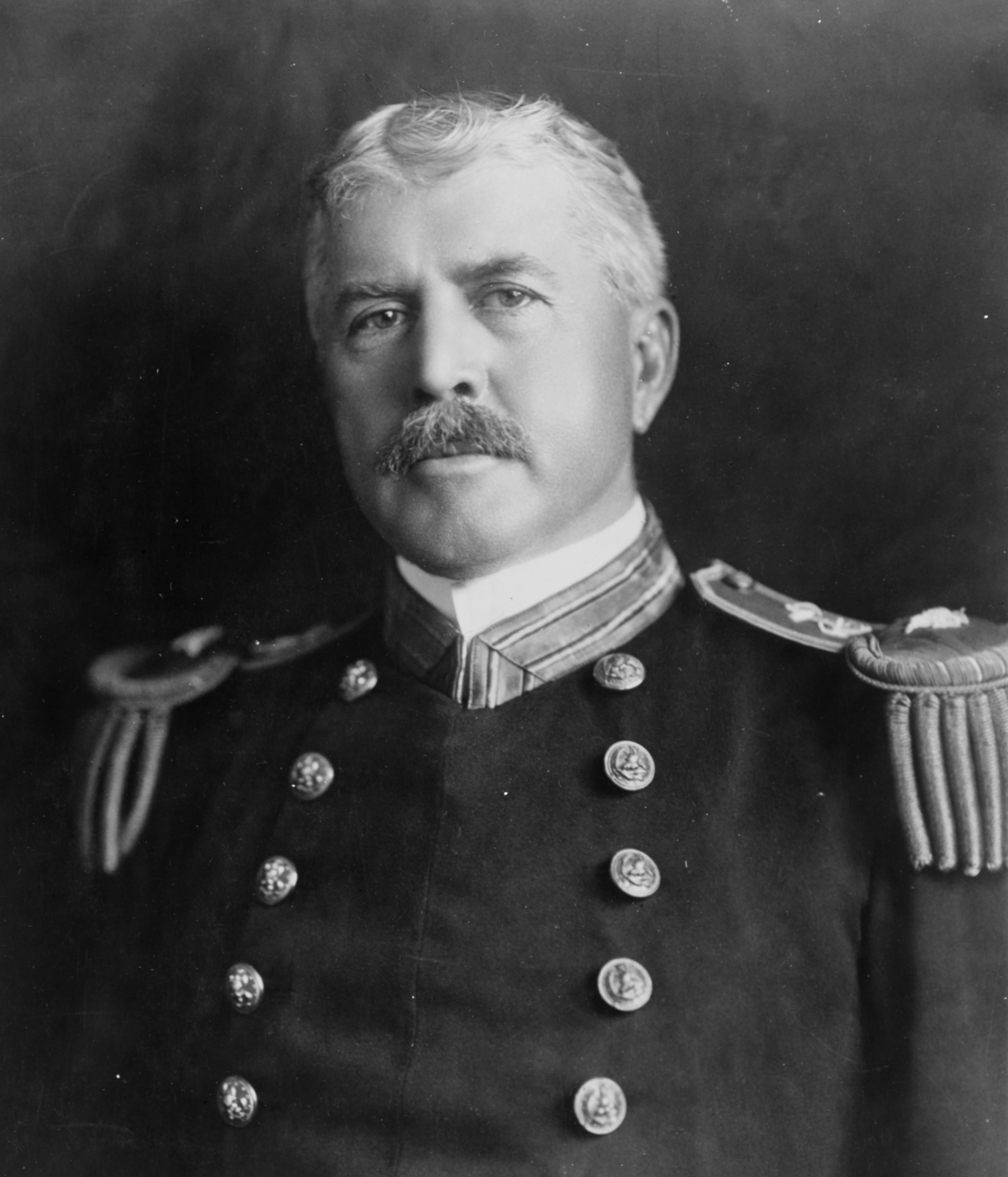
- Born: December 3, 1859; Florence, Alabama
- Died: February 11, 1919 (aged 59); Annapolis, Maryland
- Burial place: U. S. Naval Academy Cemetery
- Military career
- Allegiance: United States of America
- Branch: United States Navy
- Service years: 1875–1918
- Rank: Rear Admiral
- Commands: USS Hawk; USS Elcano; USS Tacoma; USS Rhode Island; USS Texas
- Conflicts: Spanish–American War; World War I

John Hood (3 December 1859 – 11 February 1919) was a rear admiral of the United States Navy during World War I. He was also a veteran of the Spanish–American War.

== Biography ==
Hood was born in Florence, Alabama, on 3 December 1859. He was appointed to the United States Naval Academy in 1875, and graduated from the Naval Academy, second in his class, with only Randolph H. Miner having a higher order of merits. His first cruise after graduation took him to the South Atlantic in the sloop-of-war Shenandoah, and he later sailed in the Wachusett, Brooklyn, Vandalia, Mohican, Jamestown, Constellation, Bancroft and Kearsarge. Hood was wrecked with Kearsarge on 21 February 1894 near Roncador Cay off Central America in the Pacific. He was a lieutenant in the battleship Maine when she was blown up at Havana on 15 February 1898.

Hood commanded the gunboat Hawk during the Spanish–American War, and carried information of the arrival of the Spanish Caribbean Squadron off Santiago, Cuba, to Commodore Winfield S. Schley, the commander of the Flying Squadron at Cienfuegos, and delivered orders for him to proceed to Santiago on 23 May 1898. He also served in the collier Nero during the war. Hood surveyed the Pacific in 1899–1900 to prepare data and charts by which the Pacific telegraph cable was laid.

Hood commanded the gunboat Elcano in Chinese waters during the Russo-Japanese War from 1903 to 1905, and the protected cruiser Tacoma from 1907 to 1909, during Haitian and Central American revolutions and elections. He was in charge of the ships at the Naval Academy in 1909 and 1910. He commanded the battleship Rhode Island of the Atlantic Fleet in 1910–11. Under him in 1911–12, Delaware won the battle efficiency pennant. From 1912 to 1915 he was a member of the General Board of the Navy. In 1915–16 he commanded the battleship Texas which won the "Red E" for excellence in engineering efficiency.

He was promoted to rear admiral on 29 August 1916, and retired on 18 March 1918. Admiral Hood died of Bright's disease at the Naval Hospital, Annapolis, Maryland, on 11 February 1919 and is buried at the U. S. Naval Academy Cemetery there.

== Namesake ==
In 1943, the destroyer USS John Hood (DD-655) was named in his honor.
