= Richard Hakluyt (barrister) =

16th-century English barrister and politician

Richard Hakluyt (born by 1531 – died 1591), of the Middle Temple, London and Eyton in Leominster, Herefordshire, was an English barrister, a cousin of his more famous namesake.

In 1558 Hakluyt was briefly a Member of the Parliament of England for Leominster. In 1571 he was appointed Commissioner for Customs and became a bencher of the Middle Temple in May 1585. His Will was proved in 1591.
