= Thomas Hood (Leominster MP) =

English politician

Thomas Hood (fl. 1419–1423) of Leominster, Herefordshire, was an English politician.

His sons were also MPs: William and Walter Hood. His father was John Hood, also an MP for Leominster.

He was a Member (MP) of the Parliament of England for Leominster in 1419, 1420, December 1421 and 1423.
