= Thomas Coningsby II =

English politician

Thomas Coningsby II (died 1616), of Hampton Wafer, Herefordshire was an English politician.

Coningsby was the 3rd son of Thomas Coningsby I of Leominster, Herefordshire.

Coningsby was a Clerk of the Petty Bag from 1607 to 1609.

Coningsby was a member (MP) of the parliament of England for Leominster 1601, 1604 and 1614.
