= Thomas Coningsby I =

16th-century English politician

Thomas Coningsby I (fl. 1559), of Leominster, was an English politician.

Coningsby was a member (MP) of the parliament of England for Leominster in 1559.

Coningsby's son was Thomas Coningsby II (died 1616), also an MP.
