= USS John Hood =

Fletcher-class destroyer

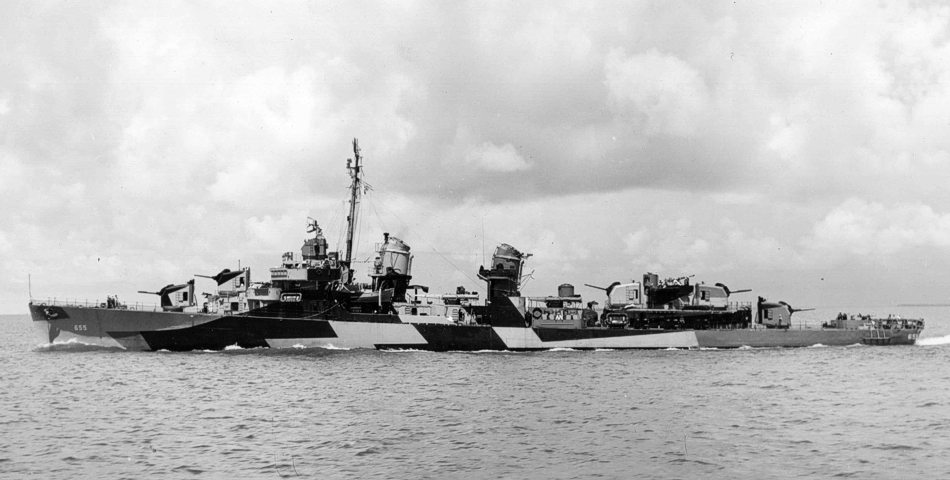
- USS John Hood (DD-655) in Mobile Bay 1944

History

United States
- Namesake: John Hood
- Builder: Gulf Shipbuilding Corp., Chickasaw, Alabama
- Laid down: 12 October 1942
- Launched: 25 October 1943
- Commissioned: 7 June 1944
- Decommissioned: 30 June 1964
- Stricken: 1 December 1974
- Fate: Sold for scrap, 12 April 1976

General characteristics
- Class & type: Fletcher-class destroyer
- Displacement: 2,050 tons
- Length: 376 ft 6 in (114.7 m)
- Beam: 39 ft 8 in (12.1 m)
- Draft: 17 ft 9 in (5.4 m)
- Propulsion: 60,000 shp (45 MW); 2 propellers
- Speed: 35 knots (65 km/h; 40 mph)
- Range: 6500 nmi. (12,000 km); at 15 kt
- Complement: 319
- Armament: 5 × 5 in (130 mm), 4 × 40 mm AA guns, 4 × 20 mm AA guns, 10 × 21 inch (533 mm) torpedo tubes, 6 × depth charge projectors, 2 × depth charge tracks

USS John Hood (DD-655) was a Fletcher-class destroyer of the United States Navy, named for Rear Admiral John Hood (1859–1919).

John Hood was laid down 12 October 1942 by Gulf Shipbuilding Corp., Chickasaw, Ala.; launched 25 October 1943, sponsored by Miss Amelia O'Neal; and commissioned 7 June 1944.

== World War II ==
After shakedown in the Caribbean, the new destroyer departed for the Pacific 21 August 1944, arriving Mare Island Naval Shipyard 6 September. She sailed on to the Aleutian Islands for duty with the North Pacific Forces, arriving Adak, Alaska 18 September. John Hood joined Destroyer Squadron 57 (DesRon 57) of Rear Admiral John L. McCrea's Task Force 92 (TF 92) and served her entire war career in the stormy waters of the North Pacific. The principal offensive missions were to harass and threaten the enemy outposts in the Kuril Islands, more than 600 miles (1,100 km) westward of Attu. In carrying out this mission, the Task Force made nine sorties against the Kurils and five offensive sweeps in the Sea of Okhotsk, hampered by bad weather, and well beyond the range of friendly air cover. John Hood was the only ship of the task force which participated in every sortie from reporting through the end of the war.

In November she engaged in the bombardment of the Japanese base on Matsuwa, causing considerable damage to the installation. She continued sorties and patrol operations in the Kurils through the winter and spring of 1945. While patrolling in the Sea of Okhotsk 25 June 1945, John Hood encountered an enemy convoy attempting last minute reinforcements to the badly battered Japanese garrisons. The destroyer assisted in sinking one cargo ship and probable sinking of another. On 11 August her task group conducted one of the final naval operations of the war by destroying another enemy convoy.

Following the cessation of hostilities, she steamed to Adak to prepare for occupation duties. John Hood departed Adak 31 August with a large force headed for Northern Japan. The battle tested destroyer remained in Northern Japanese waters with the occupations forces until she turned homeward 18 November. She arrived Charleston, S.C., 22 December and remained there until she decommissioned 3 July 1946 and entered the Atlantic Reserve Fleet.

== 1951 – 1964 ==
John Hood recommissioned 3 August 1951. Following commissioning she received major modifications to enable her to assume a place in the modern fleet.

John Hood departed Norfolk 29 June for an around-world cruise, including peace-keeping patrols with the 7th Fleet off the coast of Korea. She returned to Norfolk 6 February 1954 for repairs and coastal training operations before sailing 5 November 1955 for Mediterranean duty with the 6th Fleet. Upon returning to Norfolk 26 February 1956, the destroyer received repairs to her storm-damaged mast and then trained midshipmen in the summer. During the tense Suez Crisis in the fall she sailed with Task Force 26 to Lisbon to be ready for action if needed and returned to the Virginia Capes in December.

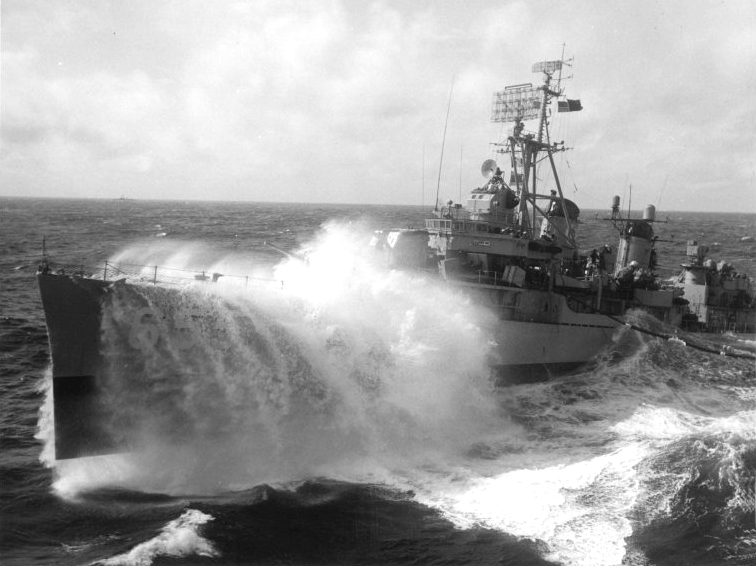
John Hood being refueled in heavy seas, 1962.

Following training exercises along the Atlantic coast, and another 6th Fleet cruise 1957 in the still turbulent Mideastern waters, John Hood commenced training cruises in early 1958. She operated with Fleet Sonar School and engaged in antisubmarine warfare (ASW) exercises before being transferred to the Reserve Destroyer Squadron at New York 1 October 1959. She continued training reservists until 1 August 1961, when President John F. Kennedy ordered a callup of reservists to bolster the nation's military strength during the Berlin crisis. The American answer to the Communist challenge prevented a major conflict; and, as the crisis subsided, John Hood resumed duties as a reserve training destroyer at New York in August 1962.

The warship decommissioned on 30 June 1964, remaining in reserve until stricken from the Navy List on 1 December 1974. She was sold for scrap to Luria Bros. & Co., Inc., Cleveland, Ohio, on 12 April 1976 and removed from Navy custody by the end of that month.

John Hood received one battle star for World War II service.
