= John Bradford (MP) =

English politician

John Bradford (fl. 1377–1391), of Leominster, Herefordshire, was an English politician.

He was a Member (MP) of the Parliament of England for Leominster in January 1377, January 1380, 1385 and 1391.
