= Clive Bossom =

British politician

Sir Clive Bossom Bt FRSA FRGS

Member of Parliament for Leominster
- In office 8 October 1959 – 8 February 1974
- Preceded by: Archer Baldwin
- Succeeded by: Peter Temple-Morris

Personal details
- Born: 4 February 1918 New York City, U.S.
- Died: 8 March 2017 (aged 99)
- Party: Conservative
- Spouse: Barbara Joan North (m. 1951)
- Children: 4
- Education: Eton College

Sir Clive Bossom, 2nd Baronet, FRSA, FRGS (4 February 1918 – 8 March 2017) was a British Conservative politician and Member of Parliament (MP).

== Early life and political career ==
Bossom was the second but only surviving son of Alfred Charles Bossom (also an MP, later ennobled as Lord Bossom) and his first wife Emily Bayne. Born in New York City, he was educated at Eton. As a regular soldier he served throughout the Second World War in The Buffs (Royal East Kent Regiment) in Europe and the Far East rising to the rank of major. He resigned his commission in 1948.

His political career began in 1949 when he became a County Councillor in Kent until 1951 and he was subsequently Conservative Member of Parliament for Leominster from 1959 to 1974. During this time he was also Parliamentary Private Secretary to the Minister of Pensions and National Insurance from 1960 to 1961, to the Secretary of State for Air from 1962 to 1964, to the Minister of Defence (RAF) in 1964 and to the Home Secretary from 1970 to 1972. Bossom succeeded to the baronetcy as Sir Clive Bossom on 4 September 1965.

== Other interests ==
Outside politics he was a director of Vosper from 1973 to 1988, chairman of Europ Assistance Ltd (1972–88), chairman of the Anglo-Eastern Bank, director of the Northern Star Insurance Co, chairman of the Royal Automobile Club, the British Motor Sports Council (1975–82), vice-chairman of the British Roads Federation (1975–82), vice-president (d'honneur) of the Fédération Internationale de l'Automobile, president of IFPA (1969–81), and Master of the Worshipful Company of Grocers (1979–80). Bossom was also active in international relations. He was president of the Anglo-Netherlands Society (1978–89), Anglo-Belgian Society (1983–85) and the Iran Society. He received several awards from these countries.

In the social fields, he was international president of the International Social Service for Refugees (1984–89), chairman of the Ex-Servicemens War Disabled Help Committee (1973–88) and vice-chairman Joint Committee of the Red Cross and St John (1987–92). He was Almoner of the Order of St. John of Jerusalem between 1987 and 1993. Bossom was a patron of the charity Children and Families Across Borders (CFAB).

== Personal life ==
Bossom married Lady Barbara Joan North (a sister of the 9th Earl of Guilford) on 28 September 1951; the couple had four children.

== Awards and decorations ==
- Knight, Most Venerable Order of the Hospital of St. John of Jerusalem (1961)
- Knight Commander of the Order of Homayoun (Iran)
- Knight Commander of the Order of Orange-Nassau (Netherlands)
- Commander of the Order of Leopold II (Belgium)
- Commander of the Order of the Crown (Belgium)
- Fellow, Royal Geographical Society
- Fellow, Royal Society of Arts

Parliament of the United Kingdom
Preceded by Sir Archer Baldwin	Member of Parliament for Leominster; 1959 – February 1974	Succeeded by Peter Temple-Morris
Baronetage of the United Kingdom
Preceded by Alfred Bossom	Baronet (of Maidstone); 1965–2017	Succeeded by Bruce Charles Bossom
