= Leominster (constituency) =

Parliamentary constituency in the United Kingdom, 1868–2010

Coordinates: 52.22°N 2.70°W

- Former county constituency for the House of Commons
- Boundary of Leominster in Herefordshire for the 2005 general election

- Location of Herefordshire within England
- County: Herefordshire

1885–2010
- Seats: One
- Created from: Herefordshire and Leominster
- Replaced by: North Herefordshire

1295–1885
- Seats: 1295–1868: Two; 1868–1885: One
- Type of constituency: Borough constituency
- Replaced by: Leominster

Leominster was a parliamentary constituency represented until 1707 in the House of Commons of England, then until 1801 in that of Great Britain, and finally until 2010, when it disappeared in boundary changes, in the Parliament of the United Kingdom.

From 1295 to 1885, Leominster was a parliamentary borough which until 1868 elected two Members of Parliament by the bloc vote system of election. Under the Reform Act 1867 its representation was reduced to one Member, elected by the first past the post system. The parliamentary borough was abolished under the Redistribution of Seats Act 1885, and the name was transferred to a new county constituency.

== History ==
Aside from two brief periods of Liberal representation, Leominster was a mostly safe Conservative seat from 1910, although sometimes by narrow majorities over the Liberal Party. The Labour Party did not put up a candidate in the constituency until 1950, and it was traditionally one of their weakest seats in the country, though the party were represented for the only time in the seat for three years in the government of Tony Blair when Conservative MP Peter Temple-Morris defected to Labour in 1998.

=== Abolition ===
Following the review by the Boundary Commission for England of parliamentary representation in Herefordshire, no longer connected for such reasons with Worcestershire, two parliamentary constituencies have been allocated to the county. Most of the Leominster seat has been replaced by the North Herefordshire seat, while the remainder of the county is covered by the Hereford and South Herefordshire seat.

=== Boundaries ===
1885–1918: The Municipal Borough of Leominster, and the Sessional Divisions of Bredwardine, Bromyard, Kingston, Leominster, Weobley, and Wigmore.

1918–1950: The Municipal Borough of Leominster, the Urban Districts of Bromyard and Kington, the Rural Districts of Bredwardine, Bromyard, Kington, Leominster, Weobley, and Wigmore, and parts of the Rural Districts of Hereford and Ledbury.

1950–1974: The Municipal Borough of Leominster, the Urban Districts of Bromyard, Kington, and Ledbury, the Rural Districts of Bromyard, Kington, Ledbury, Leominster, and Weobley and Wigmore, and part of the Rural District of Hereford.

1974–1983: The Municipal Borough of Leominster, the Urban District of Kington, the Rural Districts of Bromyard, Kington, Ledbury, Leominster, and Weobley and Wigmore, and part of the Rural District of Hereford.

1983–1997: The District of Leominster, the District of Malvern Hills wards of Baldwin, Bringsty, Broadheath, Bromyard, Butterley, Cradley, Frome, Frome Vale, Hallow, Hegdon, Hope End, Laugherne Hill, Leadon Vale, Ledbury, Leigh and Bransford, Marcle Ridge, Martley, Temeside, and Woodbury, and the District of South Herefordshire wards of Burghill, Burmarsh, Dinmore Hill, Hagley, Magna, Munstone, Swainshill, and Thinghill.

1997–2010: The District of Leominster, the District of Malvern Hills wards of Bringsty, Bromyard, Butterley, Cradley, Frome, Frome Vale, Hegdon, Hope End, Leadon Vale, Ledbury, and Marcle Ridge, the District of South Herefordshire wards of Backbury, Burghill, Burmarsh, Credenhill, Dinmore Hill, Hagley, Munstone, Swainshill, and Thinghill, and the District of Wyre Forest ward of Rock and Ribbesford.

In its final form, the constituency consisted of northern Herefordshire and a small part of north-west Worcestershire, the boundaries having been specified when the two were joined as the single county of Hereford and Worcester. In Herefordshire it included the towns of Bromyard, Kington and Ledbury as well as Leominster, while the largest settlement of Worcestershire it included was Tenbury Wells.

== Members of Parliament ==
=== To 1660 ===
Parliament	First member	Second member
1386	Robert Caldebrook	Walter Aston
1388 (Feb)	Robert Caldebrook	John Montgomery
1388 (Sep)	John Aston	Walter Aston
1390 (Jan)	Hugh Aston	Peter Cook
1390 (Nov)		
1391	Peter Cook	John Bradford
1393	Roger Loutwardin	John Hood
1394		
1395	Thomas Barber	Thomas Reynold
1397 (Jan)	Thomas Reynold	William Colle
1397 (Sep)	William Taverner	John Romayn
1399	John Hood	Thomas White
1401		
1402	William Taverner	John Bond
1404 (Jan)		
1404 (Oct)		
1406	William Taverner	William Tiler
1407	William Taverner	William Tiler
1410	Edmund Morris	Walter Borgate
1411		
1413 (Feb)		
1413 (May)	John Salisbury	John Romayn
1414 (Apr)		
1414 (Nov)	William Colle	John Salisbury
1415		
1416 (Mar)	John Salisbury	Reynold Smith
1416 (Oct)		
1417	John Salisbury	John Braas
1419	Thomas Hood	Reynold Smith
1420	Thomas Hood	William Raves
1421 (May)	William Stokes	John Hood
1421 (Dec)	Thomas Hood	William Raves
1510-1523	No names known	
1529	John Bell	John Hillesley
1536	?	
1539	?	
1542	?	
1545	?	
1547	William Crowche	Richard Cupper
1553 (Mar)	?	
1553 (Oct)	William Strete	John Polle
1554 (Apr)	Lewis Jones	John Evans
1554 (Nov)	Nicholas Depden	Thomas Wykes
1555	James Warnecombe	Thomas Kerry
1558	Alban Birch	Richard Hakluyt
1559	Thomas Hakluyt	Thomas Coningsby I
1562–3	Thomas Dallowe	John Morgan
1571	Edward Croft	Nicholas Depden
1572	Nicholas Depden	Fabian Phillips
1584	Thomas Wigmore	Edward Croft
1586	Edward Croft	Thomas Wigmore
1588	Thomas Shoter	Humphrey Wall
1593	Sir Francis Vere	Richard Coningsby
1597	Thomas Crompton	John Creswell
1601	Thomas Coningsby	John Warnecombe
1604	Thomas Coningsby	John Powle
1614	Sir Humphrey Baskerville	Thomas Coningsby
1621-1622	Francis Smallman	William Beecher
1624	James Tomkins	Sir William Beecher
1625	James Tomkins	Edward Littleton
1626	James Tomkins	Edward Littleton
1628	James Tomkins	Edward Littleton, sat for Caernarvon and replaced by Thomas Lyttleton
1629–1640	No Parliaments summoned	
1640 (Apr)	William Smallman	Walter Kyrle
1640 (Nov)	Sampson Eure disabled 22 January 1644	Walter Kyrle
1645	Walter Kyrle excluded in 1648	John Birch excluded in 1648
1653	Leominster not represented in Barebones Parliament	
1654	John Birch	(One member only)
1656	John Birch	(One member only)
1659	John Birch	Edward Freeman

==== Members 1660-1868 (two) ====
Election	First member	First party	Second member	Second party
1660	Colonel John Birch		Edward Pytts	
1661	Ranald Grahme		Humphrey Cornewall	
Feb 1679	James Pytts		John Dutton Colt	
Sep 1679	Thomas Coningsby, Lord Coningsby from 1691		John Dutton Colt	
1685	Thomas Coningsby, Lord Coningsby from 1691		Robert Cornewall	
1689	Thomas Coningsby, Lord Coningsby from 1691		John Dutton Colt	
1698	Thomas Coningsby, Lord Coningsby from 1691		Edward Harley	
Jan 1701	Thomas Coningsby, Lord Coningsby from 1691		John Dutton Colt	
Apr 1701	Thomas Coningsby, Lord Coningsby from 1691		Edward Harley	
1710	Edward Bangham		Edward Harley	
1713	Henry Gorges		Edward Harley	
1715	The Lord Coningsby		Edward Harley	
1717	George Caswall (expelled)		Edward Harley	
1721	William Bateman		Edward Harley	
1722	Sir Archer Croft		Sir George Caswall	
1727	The Viscount Bateman		Sir George Caswall	
1734	Robert Harley		Sir George Caswall	
1741	John Caswall		Capel Hanbury	
1742	Robert Harley		Capel Hanbury	
1747	Sir Robert de Cornwall		James Peachey	
1754	Sir Charles Hanbury-Williams	Whig	Richard Gorges	
1759	Chase Price		Richard Gorges	
1761	Chase Price		Jenison Shafto	
1767	Edward Willes		Jenison Shafto	
Feb 1768	John Carnac		Jenison Shafto	
Mar 1768	John Carnac		The Viscount Bateman	Tory
1774	Thomas Hill	Tory	The Viscount Bateman	Tory
1776	Frederick Cornewall	Tory	The Viscount Bateman	Tory
1780	Richard Payne Knight	Whig	The Viscount Bateman	Tory
1784	John Hunter	Tory	Penn Assheton Curzon	Tory
1790	John Hunter	Tory	John Sawyer	Tory
1791	John Hunter	Tory	Richard Beckford	Whig
1796	John Hunter	Tory	George Augustus Pollen	Tory
1797	William Taylor	Whig	George Augustus Pollen	Tory
1802	John Lubbock	Whig	Charles Kinnaird	Whig
Jan 1806	John Lubbock	Whig	William Lamb	Whig
Nov 1806	John Lubbock	Tory	Henry Bonham	Tory
1812	John Lubbock	Tory	John Harcourt	Whig
1818	John Lubbock	Tory	Sir William Cuningham-Fairlie	Tory
1819	John Lubbock	Tory	John Harcourt	Whig
1820	The Lord Hotham	Tory	Sir William Cuningham-Fairlie	Tory
1826	The Lord Hotham	Tory	Thomas Bish	Whig
1827	The Lord Hotham	Tory	Rowland Stephenson	Tory
Feb 1830	The Lord Hotham	Tory	John Ward	Whig
Aug 1830	The Lord Hotham	Tory	William Marshall	Whig
May 1831	William Bertram Evans	Whig	Thomas Brayen	Whig
Dec 1831	William Bertram Evans	Whig	The Lord Hotham	Tory
1832	Thomas Bish	Whig	The Lord Hotham	Tory
1834	Thomas Bish	Whig	The Lord Hotham	Conservative
1837	Charles Greenaway	Whig	The Lord Hotham	Conservative
1841	Charles Greenaway	Whig	James Wigram	Conservative
1842 by-election	Charles Greenaway	Whig	George Arkwright	Conservative
1845 by-election	Sir Henry Barkly	Conservative	George Arkwright	Conservative
1849 by-election	Frederick Peel	Conservative	George Arkwright	Conservative
1852	John George Phillimore	Whig	George Arkwright	Conservative
1856 by-election	John George Phillimore	Whig	Gathorne Gathorne-Hardy	Conservative
1857	John Willoughby	Conservative	Gathorne Gathorne-Hardy	Conservative
1858 by-election	Charles Bateman-Hanbury	Conservative	Gathorne Gathorne-Hardy	Conservative
1865	Arthur Walsh	Conservative	Gathorne Gathorne-Hardy	Conservative
1866 by-election	Arthur Walsh	Conservative	Richard Arkwright	Conservative
1868 by-election	Arthur Stanhope	Conservative	Richard Arkwright	Conservative
1868	representation reduced from two Members to one			

==== Members 1868–1885 (one) ====
Election	Member	Party
1868	Richard Arkwright	Conservative
1876 by-election	Thomas Blake	Liberal
1880	James Rankin	Conservative
1885	Parliamentary borough abolished, name transferred to county constituency	

=== Leominster county constituency ===
==== Members 1885–2010 ====
Year	Member	Party
1885	Thomas Duckham	Liberal
1886	Sir James Rankin	Conservative
1906	Edmund Lamb	Liberal
1910	Sir James Rankin	Conservative
1912	H. FitzHerbert Wright	Unionist
1918	Charles Ward-Jackson	Unionist
1922	Ernest Shepperson	Unionist
1945	Archer Baldwin	Conservative
1959	Clive Bossom	Conservative
1974	Peter Temple-Morris	Conservative
1997	Peter Temple-Morris	Independent Conservative
1998	Peter Temple-Morris	Labour
2001	Bill Wiggin	Conservative
2010	Constituency abolished	

== Elections ==
=== Elections in the 1830s ===
Stephenson was declared bankrupt and unseated, causing a by-election.

By-election, 11 February 1830: Leominster
Party	Candidate	Votes	%
Whig	John Ward	Unopposed	
Whig gain from Tory			

General election 1830: Leominster
Party	Candidate	Votes	%
Tory	Beaumont Hotham	Unopposed	
Whig	William Marshall	Unopposed	
Registered electors		c. 740	
Tory hold			
Whig hold			

General election 1831: Leominster
Party	Candidate	Votes	%
Whig	William Bertram Evans	563	41.5
Whig	Thomas Brayen	433	31.9
Tory	Beaumont Hotham	362	26.7
Majority		71	5.2
Turnout		702	94.9
Registered electors		c. 740	
Whig hold			
Whig gain from Tory			

Brayen resigned, causing a by-election.

By-election, 22 December 1831: Leominster
Party	Candidate	Votes	%	±%
Tory	Beaumont Hotham	346	51.5	
Whig	William Fraser	326	48.5	
Majority		20	3.0	N/A
Turnout		672	c. 90.8	
Registered electors		c. 740		
Tory gain from Whig		Swing		

General election 1832: Leominster
Party	Candidate	Votes	%
Whig	Thomas Bish	Unopposed	
Tory	Beaumont Hotham	Unopposed	
Registered electors		779	
Whig hold			
Tory gain from Whig			

General election 1835: Leominster
Party	Candidate	Votes	%
Whig	Thomas Bish	Unopposed	
Conservative	Beaumont Hotham	Unopposed	
Registered electors		694	
Whig hold			
Conservative hold			

General election 1837: Leominster
Party	Candidate	Votes	%
Conservative	Beaumont Hotham	395	38.5
Whig	Charles Greenaway	364	35.5
Conservative	James Wigram	266	26.0
Turnout		579	86.3
Registered electors		671	
Majority		31	3.0
Conservative hold			
Majority		98	9.5
Whig hold			

=== Elections in the 1840s ===
General election 1841: Leominster
Party	Candidate	Votes	%	±%
Conservative	James Wigram	Unopposed		
Whig	Charles Greenaway	Unopposed		
Registered electors		619		
Conservative hold				
Whig hold				

Wigram resigned after being appointed as a Vice-Chancellor, causing a by-election.

By-election, 8 February 1842: Leominster
Party	Candidate	Votes	%	±%
Conservative	George Arkwright	Unopposed		
Conservative gain from Whig				

Greenaway resigned by accepting the office of Steward of the Chiltern Hundreds, causing a by-election.

By-election, 26 April 1845: Leominster
Party	Candidate	Votes	%	±%
Conservative	Henry Barkly	Unopposed		
Conservative hold				

General election 1847: Leominster
Party	Candidate	Votes	%	±%
Conservative	George Arkwright	Unopposed		
Conservative	Henry Barkly	Unopposed		
Registered electors		631		
Conservative hold				
Conservative gain from Whig				

Barkly resigned after being appointed Governor of British Guiana, causing a by-election.

By-election, 6 February 1849: Leominster
Party	Candidate	Votes	%	±%
Conservative	Frederick Peel	Unopposed		
Conservative hold				

=== Elections in the 1850s ===
General election 1852: Leominster
Party	Candidate	Votes	%	±%
Conservative	George Arkwright	260	39.6	N/A
Whig	John George Phillimore	206	31.4	New
Conservative	John Willoughby	190	29.0	N/A
Turnout		328 (est)	59.5 (est)	N/A
Registered electors		551		
Majority		54	8.2	N/A
Conservative hold		Swing	N/A	
Majority		16	2.4	N/A
Whig gain from Conservative		Swing	N/A	

Arkwright's death caused a by-election.

By-election, 19 February 1856: Leominster
Party	Candidate	Votes	%	±%
Conservative	Gathorne Hardy	179	63.9	−4.7
Whig	James Campbell	101	36.1	+4.7
Majority		78	27.8	+19.6
Turnout		280	72.4	+12.9
Registered electors		387		
Conservative hold		Swing	−4.7	

General election 1857: Leominster
Party	Candidate	Votes	%	±%
Conservative	Gathorne Hardy	Unopposed		
Conservative	John Willoughby	Unopposed		
Registered electors		370		
Conservative hold				
Conservative gain from Whig				

Willoughby resigned after being appointed as a Member of the Council of India, causing a by-election.

By-election, 22 October 1858: Leominster
Party	Candidate	Votes	%	±%
Conservative	Charles Bateman-Hanbury	Unopposed		
Conservative hold				

General election 1859: Leominster
Party	Candidate	Votes	%	±%
Conservative	Gathorne Hardy	Unopposed		
Conservative	Charles Bateman-Hanbury	Unopposed		
Registered electors		392		
Conservative hold				
Conservative hold				

=== Elections in the 1860s ===
General election 1865: Leominster
Party	Candidate	Votes	%	±%
Conservative	Arthur Walsh	214	38.3	N/A
Conservative	Gathorne Hardy	208	37.2	N/A
Liberal	William Mathewson Hindmarch	137	24.5	New
Majority		71	12.7	N/A
Turnout		348	94.8	N/A
Registered electors		367		
Conservative hold				
Conservative hold				

Hardy was also elected MP for Oxford University and opted to sit there, causing a by-election.

By-election, 26 February 1866: Leominster
Party	Candidate	Votes	%	±%
Conservative	Richard Arkwright	Unopposed		
Conservative hold				

Walsh resigned in order to contest a by-election in Radnorshire, causing a by-election.

By-election, 27 April 1868: Leominster
Party	Candidate	Votes	%	±%
Conservative	Arthur Stanhope	Unopposed		
Conservative hold				

Seat reduced to one member

General election 1868: Leominster
Party	Candidate	Votes	%	±%
Conservative	Richard Arkwright	432	71.3	−4.2
Liberal	Thomas Spinks	174	28.7	+4.2
Majority		258	42.6	+29.9
Turnout		606	68.7	−26.1
Registered electors		882		
Conservative hold		Swing	−4.2	

=== Elections in the 1870s ===
General election 1874: Leominster
Party	Candidate	Votes	%	±%
Conservative	Richard Arkwright	Unopposed		
Registered electors		905		
Conservative hold				

Arkwright resigned, causing a by-election.

By-election, 16 Feb 1876: Leominster
Party	Candidate	Votes	%	±%
Liberal	Thomas Blake	434	55.4	New
Conservative	Charles Bateman-Hanbury-Kincaid-Lennox	349	44.6	N/A
Majority		85	10.8	N/A
Turnout		783	84.5	N/A
Registered electors		927		
Liberal gain from Conservative		Swing	N/A	

=== Elections in the 1880s ===
General election 1880: Leominster
Party	Candidate	Votes	%	±%
Conservative	James Rankin	457	56.3	N/A
Liberal	Thomas Blake	355	43.7	N/A
Majority		102	12.6	N/A
Turnout		812	90.2	N/A
Registered electors		900		
Conservative hold		Swing	N/A	

General election 1885: Leominster
Party	Candidate	Votes	%	±%
Liberal	Thomas Duckham	3,871	50.8	+7.1
Conservative	James Rankin	3,750	49.2	−7.1
Majority		121	1.6	N/A
Turnout		7,621	81.8	−8.4
Registered electors		9,314		
Liberal gain from Conservative		Swing	+7.1	

James Rankin

General election 1886: Leominster
Party	Candidate	Votes	%	±%
Conservative	James Rankin	4,287	64.2	+15.0
Liberal	Edward Scudamore Lucas	2,394	35.8	−15.0
Majority		1,893	28.4	N/A
Turnout		6,681	71.7	−10.1
Registered electors		9,314		
Conservative gain from Liberal		Swing	+15.0	

=== Elections in the 1890s ===
General election 1892: Leominster
Party	Candidate	Votes	%	±%
Conservative	James Rankin	4,318	59.7	−4.5
Liberal	James Tertius Southall	2,918	40.3	+4.5
Majority		1,400	19.4	−9.0
Turnout		7,236	74.0	+2.3
Registered electors		9,778		
Conservative hold		Swing	−4.5	

General election 1895: Leominster
Party	Candidate	Votes	%	±%
Conservative	James Rankin	Unopposed		
Conservative hold				

=== Elections in the 1900s ===
General election 1900: Leominster
Party	Candidate	Votes	%	±%
Conservative	James Rankin	Unopposed		
Conservative hold				

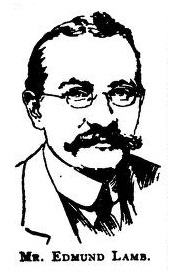

General election January 1906: Leominster
Party	Candidate	Votes	%	±%
Liberal	Edmund Lamb	3,892	50.2	New
Conservative	James Rankin	3,864	49.8	N/A
Majority		28	0.4	N/A
Turnout		7,756	83.1	N/A
Registered electors		9,328		
Liberal gain from Conservative		Swing	N/A	

=== Elections in the 1910s ===
General election January 1910: Leominster
Party	Candidate	Votes	%	±%
Conservative	James Rankin	4,822	54.7	+4.9
Liberal	Edmund Lamb	3,991	45.3	−4.9
Majority		831	9.4	N/A
Turnout		8,813	91.0	+7.9
Registered electors		9,689		
Conservative gain from Liberal		Swing	+4.9	

General election December 1910: Leominster
Party	Candidate	Votes	%	±%
Conservative	James Rankin	4,600	57.3	+2.6
Liberal	Wyatt Wyatt-Paine	3,431	42.7	−2.6
Majority		1,169	14.6	+5.2
Turnout		8,031	82.9	−8.1
Registered electors		9,689		
Conservative hold		Swing	+2.6	

By-election, 1912: Leominster
Party	Candidate	Votes	%	±%
Unionist	Henry Wright	Unopposed		
Unionist hold				

General election 1918: Leominster
Party		Candidate	Votes	%	±%
C	Unionist	Charles Ward-Jackson	8,308	50.5	−6.8
	Liberal	Edmund Lamb	5,291	32.1	−10.6
	National Farmers Union	Ernest Wilfred Langford	2,870	17.4	New
Majority			3,017	18.4	+3.8
Turnout			16,469	62.9	−20.0
Registered electors			26,184		
	Unionist hold		Swing	+1.9	
C indicates candidate endorsed by the coalition government.

- Some records describe Lamb as an Independent Radical.
- Langford was also a Liberal.

=== Elections in the 1920s ===
General election 1922: Leominster
Party	Candidate	Votes	%	±%
Unionist	Ernest Shepperson	10,978	53.1	+2.6
Liberal	Geoffrey Mander	9,698	46.9	+14.8
Majority		1,280	6.2	−12.2
Turnout		20,676	79.0	+16.1
Registered electors		26,182		
Unionist hold		Swing	−6.1	

General election 1923: Leominster
Party	Candidate	Votes	%	±%
Unionist	Ernest Shepperson	11,582	57.3	+4.2
Liberal	James Dockett	8,614	42.7	−4.2
Majority		2,968	14.6	+8.4
Turnout		20,196	75.8	−3.2
Registered electors		26,658		
Unionist hold		Swing	+4.2	

General election 1924: Leominster
Party	Candidate	Votes	%	±%
Unionist	Ernest Shepperson	12,470	64.4	+7.1
Liberal	George Adolphus Edinger	6,897	35.6	−7.1
Majority		5,573	28.8	+14.2
Turnout		19,367	71.6	−4.2
Registered electors		27,033		
Unionist hold		Swing	+7.1	

General election 1929: Leominster
Party	Candidate	Votes	%	±%
Unionist	Ernest Shepperson	13,237	52.5	−11.9
Liberal	George Adolphus Edinger	11,990	47.5	+11.9
Majority		1,247	5.0	−23.8
Turnout		25,227	76.3	+4.7
Registered electors		33,046		
Unionist hold		Swing	−11.9	

=== Elections in the 1930s ===
General election 1931: Leominster
Party	Candidate	Votes	%	±%
Conservative	Ernest Shepperson	16,916	63.3	+10.8
Liberal	George Adolphus Edinger	9,803	36.7	−10.8
Majority		7,113	26.6	+21.6
Turnout		26,719	79.9	+3.6
Conservative hold		Swing	10.8	

General election 1935: Leominster
Party	Candidate	Votes	%	±%
Conservative	Ernest Shepperson	14,180	53.2	−10.1
Liberal	Albert Edward Farr	12,465	46.8	+10.1
Majority		1,715	6.4	−20.2
Turnout		26,645	78.2	−1.7
Conservative hold		Swing	−10.1	

=== Elections in the 1940s ===
General Election 1939–40

Another General Election was required to take place before the end of 1940. The political parties had been making preparations for an election to take place from 1939 and by the end of this year, the following candidates had been selected;

- Conservative: Ernest Shepperson
- Liberal: Albert Edward Farr

General election 1945: Leominster
Party	Candidate	Votes	%	±%
Conservative	Archer Baldwin	14,224	51.1	−2.1
Liberal	Albert Edward Farr	13,586	48.9	+2.1
Majority		638	2.2	−4.2
Turnout		27,810	74.4	−3.8
Conservative hold		Swing	−2.1	

=== Elections in the 1950s ===
General election 1950: Leominster
Party	Candidate	Votes	%	±%
Conservative	Archer Baldwin	18,036	55.86	
Labour	Edmund JM Jones	8,402	26.02	New
Liberal	George Morgan-Harris	5,850	18.12	
Majority		9,634	29.84	
Turnout		32,288	80.85	
Conservative hold		Swing		

General election 1951: Leominster
Party	Candidate	Votes	%	±%
Conservative	Archer Baldwin	19,952	66.75	
Labour	Edmund JM Jones	9,939	33.25	
Majority		10,013	33.50	
Turnout		29,891	74.16	
Conservative hold		Swing		

General election 1955: Leominster
Party	Candidate	Votes	%	±%
Conservative	Archer Baldwin	18,487	65.49	
Labour	Alfred Evans	9,740	34.51	
Majority		8,747	30.98	
Turnout		28,227	70.40	
Conservative hold		Swing		

General election 1959: Leominster
Party	Candidate	Votes	%	±%
Conservative	Clive Bossom	16,642	55.43	
Liberal	Grenville Jones	6,905	23.00	New
Labour	Frederick W Bowerman	6,475	21.57	
Majority		9,737	32.43	
Turnout		30,022	76.38	
Conservative hold		Swing		

=== Elections in the 1960s ===
General election 1964: Leominster
Party	Candidate	Votes	%	±%
Conservative	Clive Bossom	15,238	50.91	
Liberal	Edward Paul Cadbury	8,941	29.87	
Labour	Kenneth A Gulleford	5,750	19.21	
Majority		6,297	21.04	
Turnout		29,929	77.13	
Conservative hold		Swing		

General election 1966: Leominster
Party	Candidate	Votes	%	±%
Conservative	Clive Bossom	15,045	51.47	
Liberal	Edward Paul Cadbury	7,647	26.16	
Labour	K Roy Simmons	6,536	22.36	
Majority		7,398	25.31	
Turnout		29,228	75.17	
Conservative hold		Swing		

=== Elections in the 1970s ===
General election 1970: Leominster
Party	Candidate	Votes	%	±%
Conservative	Clive Bossom	17,630	57.97	
Liberal	Roger Pincham	6,462	21.25	
Labour	Martyn Sloman	6,321	20.78	
Majority		11,168	36.72	
Turnout		30,413	72.84	
Conservative hold		Swing		

General election February 1974: Leominster
Party	Candidate	Votes	%	±%
Conservative	Peter Temple-Morris	16,221	46.35	
Liberal	Roger Pincham	14,602	41.73	
Labour	Clive Lindley	4,172	11.92	
Majority		1,619	4.62	
Turnout		34,995	80.07	
Conservative hold		Swing		

General election October 1974: Leominster
Party	Candidate	Votes	%	±%
Conservative	Peter Temple-Morris	15,741	46.07	
Liberal	Roger Pincham	15,162	44.38	
Labour	S Allen	3,264	9.55	
Majority		579	1.69	
Turnout		34,167	77.56	
Conservative hold		Swing		

General election 1979: Leominster
Party	Candidate	Votes	%	±%
Conservative	Peter Temple-Morris	21,126	53.50	
Liberal	Roger Pincham	16,261	41.18	
Labour	PJ Dobbs	2,099	5.32	
Majority		4,865	12.32	
Turnout		39,486	81.90	
Conservative hold		Swing		

=== Elections in the 1980s ===
General election 1983: Leominster
Party	Candidate	Votes	%	±%
Conservative	Peter Temple-Morris	29,276	56.99	
Liberal	Roger Pincham	19,490	37.94	
Labour	Donald Wilcox	1,932	3.76	
Ecology	Felicity Norman	668	1.30	New
Majority		9,786	19.05	
Turnout		51,366	77.49	
Conservative hold		Swing		

General election 1987: Leominster
Party	Candidate	Votes	%	±%
Conservative	Peter Temple-Morris	31,396	57.86	
Liberal	Stephen Morris	17,321	31.92	
Labour	Arthur Chappell	4,444	8.19	
Green	Felicity Norman	1,102	2.00	
Majority		14,075	25.94	
Turnout		54,263	77.54	
Conservative hold		Swing		

=== Elections in the 1990s ===
General election 1992: Leominster
Party	Candidate	Votes	%	±%
Conservative	Peter Temple-Morris	32,783	56.6	−1.1
Liberal Democrats	DC Short	16,103	27.8	−4.1
Labour	Chris Chappell	6,874	11.9	+3.7
Green	Felicity Norman	1,503	2.6	+0.6
Anti-Federalist League	EP Carlisle	640	1.1	New
Majority		16,680	28.8	+2.9
Turnout		57,903	81.7	+3.2
Conservative hold		Swing	+1.4	

General election 1997: Leominster
Party	Candidate	Votes	%	±%
Conservative	Peter Temple-Morris	22,888	45.3	
Liberal Democrats	Terry James	14,053	27.8	
Labour	Richard Westwood	8,831	17.5	
Referendum	Anthony Parkin	2,815	5.6	New
Green	Felicity Norman	1,086	2.1	
UKIP	Richard Chamings	588	1.2	New
BNP	John Haycock	292	0.6	New
Majority		8,835	17.5	
Turnout		50,553	76.6	
Conservative hold		Swing		

=== Elections in the 2000s ===
General election 2001: Leominster
Party	Candidate	Votes	%	±%
Conservative	Bill Wiggin	22,879	49.0	+3.7
Liberal Democrats	Celia Downie	12,512	26.8	−1.0
Labour	Stephen Hart	7,872	16.8	−0.7
Green	Pippa Bennett	1,690	3.6	+1.5
UKIP	Christopher Kingsley	1,590	3.4	+2.2
Independent	John Haycock	186	0.4	New
Majority		10,367	22.2	+4.7
Turnout		46,729	69.4	−7.2
Conservative hold		Swing	+2.4	

General election 2005: Leominster
Party	Candidate	Votes	%	±%
Conservative	Bill Wiggin	25,407	52.1	+3.1
Liberal Democrats	Caroline Williams	12,220	25.0	−1.8
Labour	Paul Bell	7,424	15.2	−1.6
Green	Felicity Norman	2,191	4.5	+0.9
UKIP	Peter Whyte-Venables	1,551	3.2	−0.2
Majority		13,187	27.1	+4.9
Turnout		48,793	77.3	+7.9
Conservative hold		Swing	+2.4	

== See also ==
- List of parliamentary constituencies in Herefordshire and Worcestershire
