= Walter Aston (14th-century MP) =

English politician

Walter Aston was an English politician. He sat as MP for Leominster in 1386 and September 1388.

Nothing is known about the MP other than the fact that he was related to Hugh and John Aston, with the latter he represented Leominster in 1388.
