= William Taverner (fl. 1397–1407) =

English politician

William Taverner (fl. 1397–1407), of Leominster, was an English politician.

He was a member (MP) of the parliament of England for Leominster in September 1397, 1402, 1406 and 1407.
