= The Temple of Fame =

18th-century poem by Alexander Pope

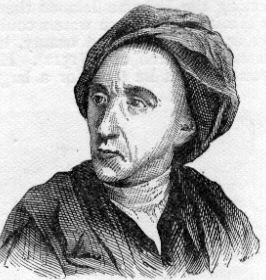
Alexander Pope, author of The Temple of Fame.

The Temple of Fame: A Vision is an eighteenth-century poem by Alexander Pope, directly inspired by Geoffrey Chaucer's fourteenth-century poem The House of Fame (Hous of Fame in the original spelling). First published in 1715, the poem comprises 524 lines which, like Chaucer's original version, take the form of a dream vision. The poem's precise date of composition is ambiguous, but Pope asserted that it was composed in 1711 even though its initial publication was implied by a letter from Pope to Martha Blount, written in 1714, in which he referred to the poem as ‘just out.’ Eventually the work was classified by the poet himself as a ‘juvenile poem’ among his earlier translations and imitations.
