= Windsor Forest (disambiguation) =

Windsor Forest usually refers to Windsor Great Park. It may also refer to:

- Windsor Forest, Guyana, a village in Guyana
- Windsor-Forest, a 1713 poem by Alexander Pope
