= Windsor-Forest =

1713 poem by Alexander Pope

- by Alexander Pope
- Title page of the fourth edition, 1720
- Rhyme scheme: Heroic couplet
- Publication date: 1713
- Metre: Iambic pentameter

Full text
- Windsor Forest (4th edition)/Windsor Forest at Wikisource

Windsor-Forest is a narrative poem in heroic couplets by Alexander Pope, published in 1713. It is distinct from the eight-line poem entitled "Lines Written in Windsor Forest".

== Windsor-Forest ==
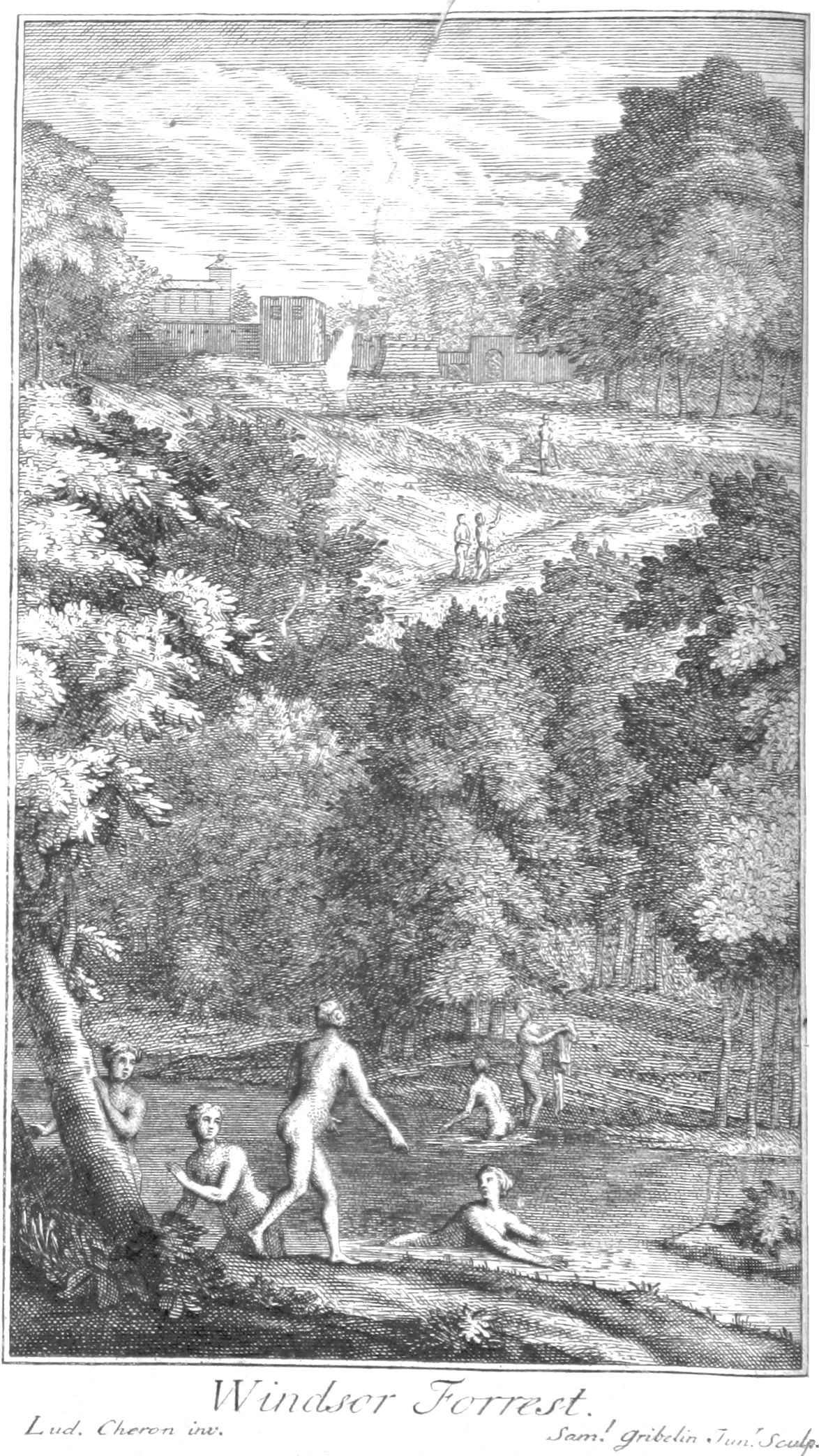
Windsor Forrest, 1720

The work appeared before 9 March 1713, on which day Pope's friend Jonathan Swift wrote to "Stella", "Mr. Pope has published a fine poem, called Windsor Forest. Read it." In his manuscript Pope says, "It was first printed in folio in ——. Again in folio the same year, and in octavo the next." It was included in the quarto of 1717, in the second edition of Lintot's Miscellany in 1714, and in the four succeeding editions of 1720, 1722, 1727 and 1732.

Pope writes, "This poem was written at two different times. The first part of it, which relates to the country, in the year 1704, at the same time with the Pastorals. The latter part was not added till the year 1713, in which it was published."

Although Pope published Windsor Forest In 1713, some part of the poem was, as he relates, written at sixteen, about the same time as his Pastorals; and the latter part was added afterwards: where the addition begins he does not say. The lines relating to the "Peace" refer to the Treaty of Utrecht of 1713. The poem is dedicated to Lord Lansdowne, who was then in high reputation and influence among the Tories.

Johnson remarks that this poem was written after the model of Denham's Cooper's Hill, with, perhaps, an eye on Waller's poem On St. James's Park.

== "Lines Written in Windsor Forest" ==
"Lines Written in Windsor Forest" was sent in an undated letter to Martha Blount. Pope to Martha Blount: "I arrived in the forest by Tuesday noon. I passed the rest of the day in those woods, where I have so often enjoyed a book and a friend; I made a hymn as I passed through, which ended with a sigh, that I will not tell you the meaning of."

All hail, once pleasing, once inspiring shade!
Scene of my youthful loves and happier hours!
Where the kind Muses met me as I stray'd,
And gently press'd my hand, and said "Be ours!—
Take all thou e'er shalt have, a constant Muse:
At Court thou may'st be liked, but nothing gain:
Stock thou may'st buy and sell, but always lose,
And love the brightest eyes, but love in vain."

== Sources ==
- Boynton, Henry W., ed. (1903). The Complete Poetical Works of Alexander Pope. Boston, New York: Houghton, Mifflin & Co. pp. 28–34, 130.
- Carruthers, Robert, ed. (1853). The Poetical Works of Alexander Pope. Vol 1. London: Ingram, Cooke, and Co. pp. 13, 67.
- Carruthers, Robert, ed. (1853). The Poetical Works of Alexander Pope. Vol 2. London: Nathaniel Cooke. pp. 121–138.
- Carruthers, Robert, ed. (1854). The Poetical Works of Alexander Pope. Vol 4. London: Nathaniel Cooke. p. 273.

Attribution:

- Croker, John Wilson; Elwin, Whitwell, eds. (1871). The Works of Alexander Pope. New ed. Vol. 1. London: John Murray. pp. 320–368.
