= John Kyrle =

English philanthropist (1637–1724)

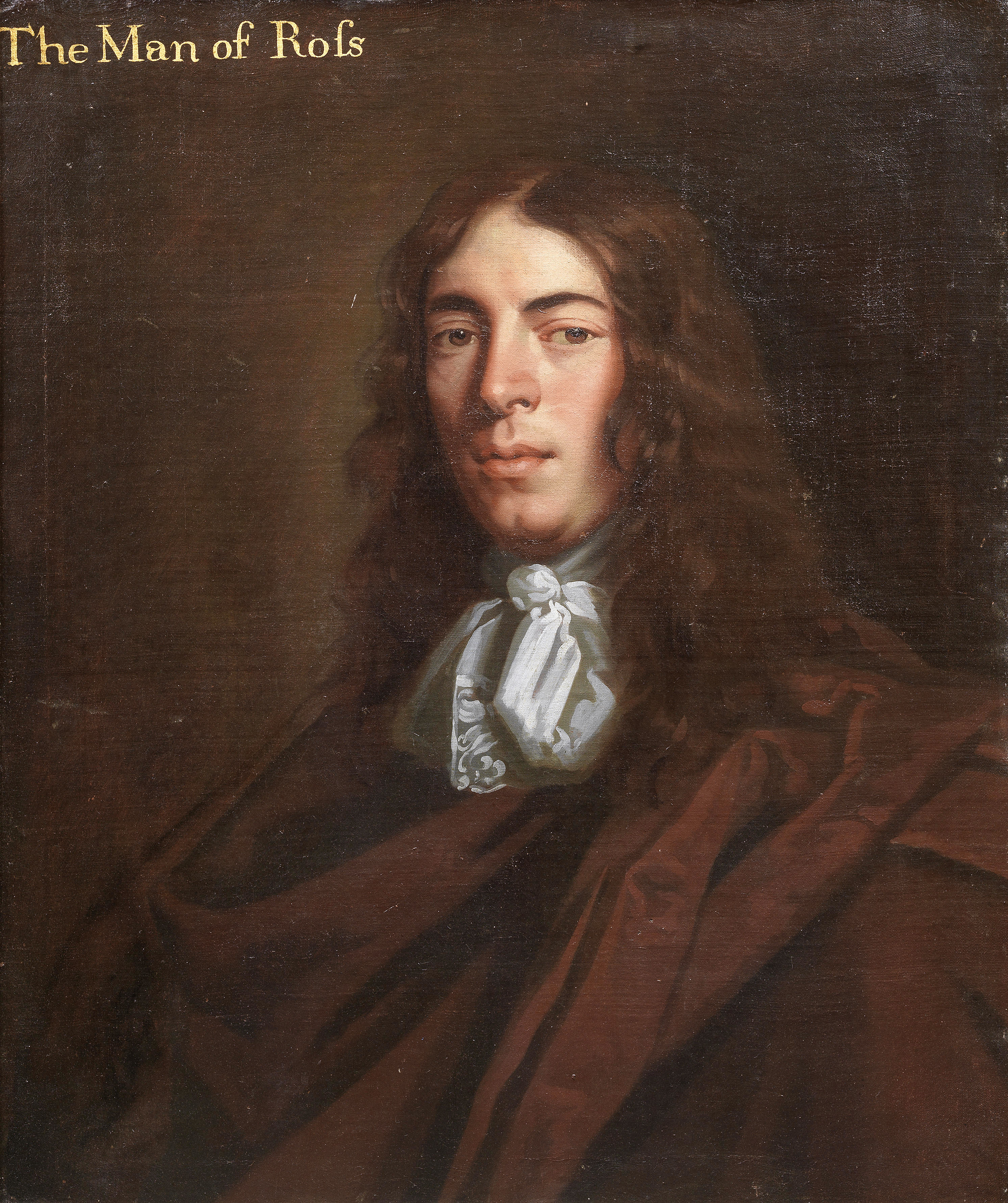
- John Kyrle, the Man of Ross by circle of Lely
- Born: 22 May 1637; The White House, Dymock, Gloucestershire, England
- Died: 7 November 1724 (aged 87); Ross-on-Wye, Herefordshire, England
- Other names: Man of Ross

John Kyrle (22 May 1637 – 7 November 1724), known as "the Man of Ross", was an English philanthropist, remembered for his time in Ross-on-Wye in Herefordshire.

== Education and legal background ==
Born in the parish of Dymock, Gloucestershire, he was the son of Walter Kyrle, a barrister and MP. The family had lived at Ross for many generations. His grandfather, James Kyrle of Walford Court, had been High Sheriff of Herefordshire and whose father, Walter, had spelled the surname Crull which had been a common surname among the Norman aristocracy that had dominated England and a name which gradually disappeared with the Anglo-French aristocracy's anglicisation. James Kyrle's wife, Ann, was the sister of the poet Edmund Waller and her maternal uncle was the statesman John Hampden.

John Kyrle was educated at Balliol College, Oxford, matriculating in 1654. He then entered to study law at the Middle Temple in 1657, but was not called to the bar. He inherited the family estate including a house overlooking the market at Ross, where he lived, following his father's death in 1650.

== Philanthropy in Ross ==
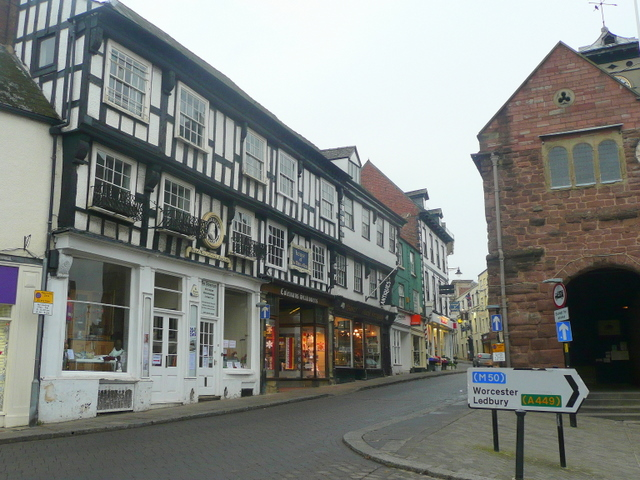
The Man of Ross House overlooking Ross Market House

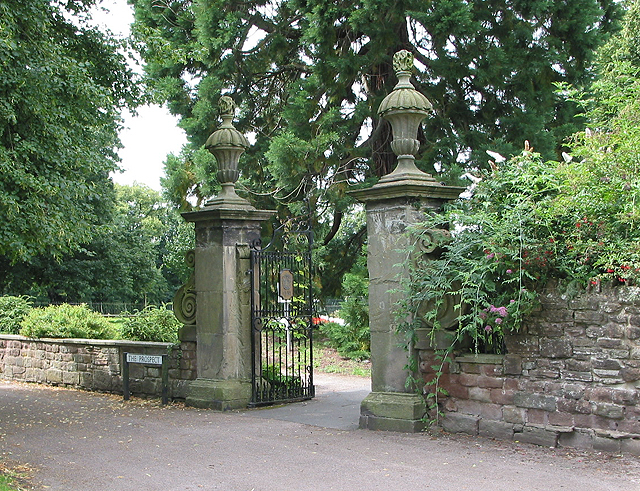
Entrance to The Prospect

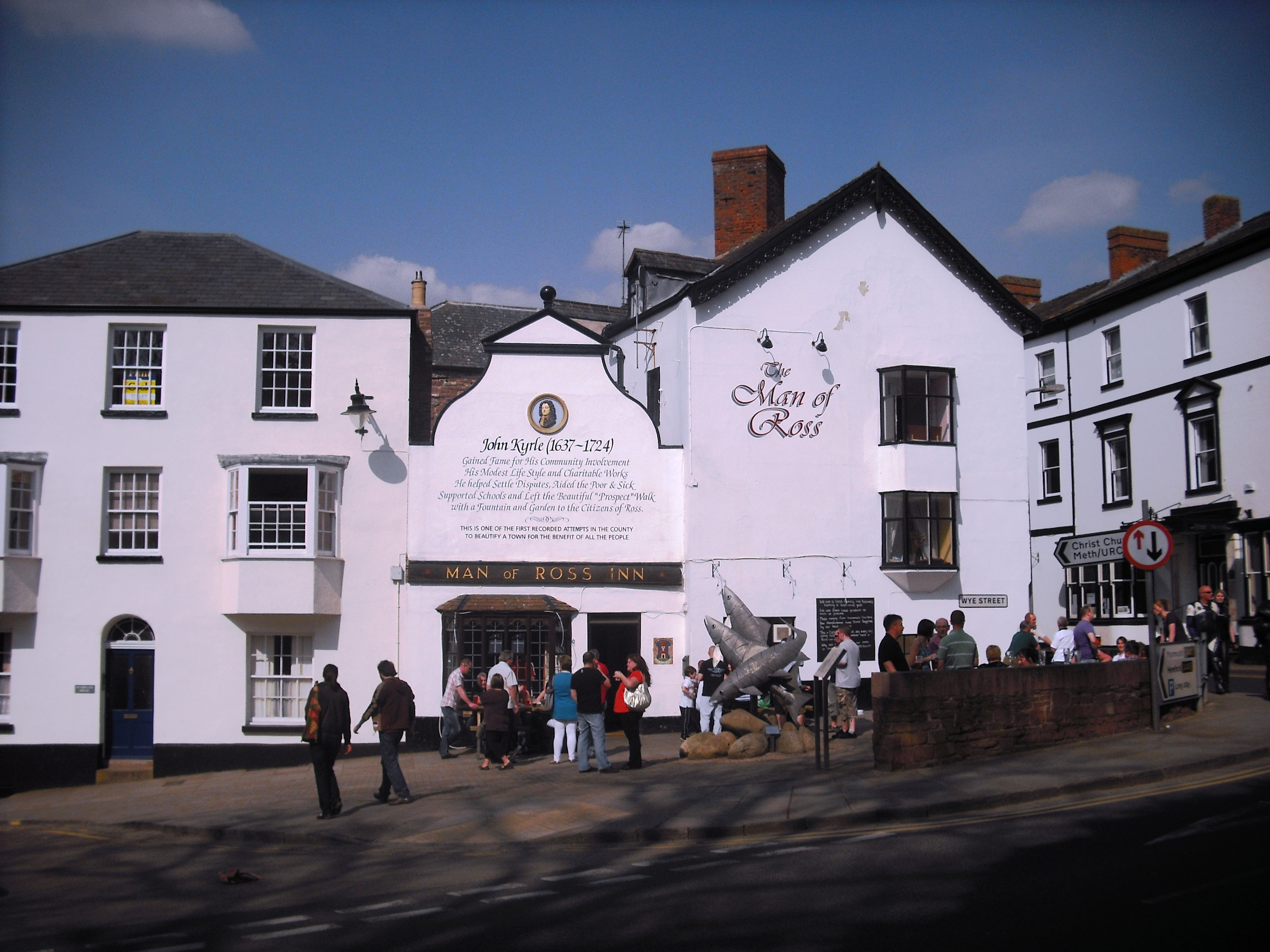
Man of Ross Inn

From his early twenties he adopted a frugal lifestyle and instead of utilising his wealth for himself, he sought to invest in the greater good of his locality and community that lived there.

In everything that concerned the welfare of the small town of Ross in which he lived he took a lively interest; in the education of the children and in improving and embellishing the town. He planted trees in and around the town, with two or three workmen to assist with the manual work. He delighted in mediating between those who had quarrelled and in preventing costly lawsuits between prominent townspeople. He was generous to the poor and spent all he had in good works.

He was behind the establishment of 'The Prospect' in Ross in 1700. The public garden on the hilltop just above Ross town centre was laid out with a viewpoint, walkways and a public fountain to provide clean water for town residents. This piece of land was rented off the Marquess of Bath in 1696 and turned into a garden and walking area. The park is still there, alongside the churchyard of St Mary's , with ornate stone gates and mature trees interspersed with benches and a walk.

Kyrle lived a great deal in the open air, working with the labourers on his farm and taking exercise to stay healthy. He died on 7 November 1724, having lived to the age of 87, and was buried in the chancel of Ross Church. His name is commemorated throughout Ross-on-Wye, not only in The Prospect but in the 'Man of Ross' public house on Wye Street and his market square townhouse. The town's secondary school carries his name.

His memory was also preserved by the Kyrle Society, founded in 1876 by Miranda and Octavia Hill, to better the life of working people, by laying out parks, encouraging house decoration, window gardening and flower growing. The Society was one of the first civic amenity bodies and a progenitor of the National Trust.

== Commemorated in verse ==
Ross and John Kyrle were eulogised by Alexander Pope in the third of his Moral Essays "Of the Use of Riches" (1734);

Who taught that heav’n directed Spire to rise?
The Man of Ross, each lisping babe replies.
Behold the Market-place with poor o'erspread!
He feeds yon Alms-house, neat, but void of state,
Where Age and Want sit smiling at the gate;
Him portion’d maids, apprentic’d orphans blest,
The young who labour, and the old who rest.
Is any sick? the Man of Ross relieves,
Prescribes, attends, the med’cine makes, and gives,
Is there a variance? enter but his door,
Balk’d are the Courts, and contest is no more.
Despairing Quacks with curses fled the place,
And vile Attornies, now a useless race.

and by Coleridge in an early poem of 1794. Pope's lines on Kyrle are referred to briefly by Henry Fielding in Joseph Andrews, in a discussion of charity.

== Bibliography ==
- Erskine-Hill, Howard (1975). Private Country Gentleman': John Kyrle Esq. The Social Milieu of Alexander Pope
- Hurley, Jon (2013). In Search of John Kyrle The Man of Ross. Ross-on-Wye: Fineleaf.
- Lawrence and Fowler (1912). Brief Memoir of John Kyrle, Esq.
- Whitehead, David (2004). John Kyrle, philanthropist and landscape designer. Oxford Dictionary of National Biography.
- Kyrle (1918). "Kyrle's relics at Brockhampton Court". Transactions of the Woolhope Field Naturalists Club.
