= Moral Essays =

Series of poems written by Alexander Pope

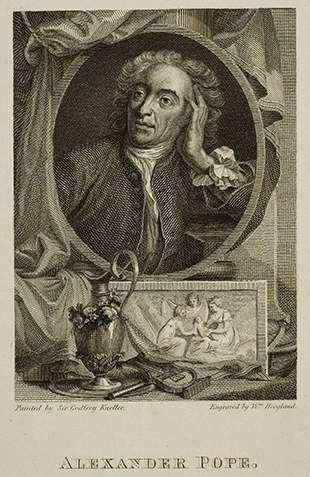
Alexander Pope's Moral Essays were published between 1731 and 1735.

Moral Essays (also known as Epistles to Several Persons) is a series of four poems on ethical subjects by Alexander Pope, published between 1731 and 1735.

== The Individual Poems ==
The four poems were first published under the name Moral Essays by William Warburton (Pope’s literary executor) in 1751, not in the chronological order in which they were first written, but in the order:

1. Epistle to Cobham (1734, addressed to Sir Richard Temple, Lord Cobham), "Of the Knowledge and Characters of Men"
2. Epistle to a Lady (1735, addressed to Martha Blount), "Of the Characters of Women"
3. Epistle to Bathurst (1733 (indicated as 1732), addressed to Allen, Lord Bathurst), "Of the Use of Riches"
4. Epistle to Burlington (1731, addressed to Richard Boyle, Earl of Burlington), "Of False Taste"

Along with An Essay on Man, which was written during the same period, they were inspired by Pope’s affection for Bolingbroke, and it seems (from what Pope told his friend Jonathan Swift) that he intended the entire work to be part of his ‘opus magnum’, a ‘system of ethics in the Horatian way’. It was Pope himself who described them as Epistles to Several Persons.

== Epistle to Burlington ==
The subtitle of this poem, initially Of False Taste, was changed to Of the Use of Riches. It covers the subject of the use of wealth in both a tasteless and a proper manner, and particularly deals with landscaping, gardens and architecture, specific interests of Lord Burlington, who had been a friend of Pope since about 1715.

The key to good taste when designing an estate, Pope says, is to ‘Consult the Genius of the Place in all’ (l. 57), a precept followed by Bathurst and others, but not by the superficial, ostentatious landowner identified as ‘Timon’. Although his description of Timon’s villa is a synthesis of details from different sites, it was soon widely criticised as an attack on the Berkshire estate of the Duke of Chandos, damaging Pope’s own reputation and career. This also put an end to any relationship between him and Sir Robert Walpole, Bolingbroke’s main political opponent.

== Epistle to Bathurst ==
Like Burlington, this epistle is subtitled Of the Use of Riches. It deals with the use of money, arguing that both greedy and wasteful people misapply it, and so derive no happiness from it, though its target is more the rising commercial class, rather than the ruling aristocracy as in Burlington. Pope presents a series of satirical portraits of wasteful or parsimonious characters, but in particular he describes ‘The Man of Ross’ (John Kyrle), who was generous with his wealth, and ‘Sir Balaam’, whose riches lead him into penury.

The Man of Ross had given generously to the town of Ross-on-Wye, though Pope may have exaggerated his benevolence. After suggesting that Bathurst might ask what vast means he had to achieve all this, the poet replies: ‘Of debts and taxes, wife and children clear, This man possest – five hundred pounds a year.’ (ll. 275-80) Though this is disclosed as if some remarkable achievement, that amount might be well into six figures in current terms, and at a time when workmen’s wages were very meagre. Nonetheless, the point was made.

Sir Balaam, by contrast, is a religious, sober (but parsimonious) tradesman of the City of London where ‘London’s column, pointing at the skies Like a tall bully, lifts its head and lies’. (ll. 339-40) - Pope’s famous attack on the blame falsely cast on Catholics for starting the Great Fire of London by the inscription on The Monument.

Balaam in the Bible was corrupted from his pious conduct by bribery, as Pope’s readers would have known, and so Sir Balaam, having risen to great wealth and success, subsequently overreaches himself, commits various offences and crimes, and is eventually hanged. The poem’s conclusion requires no moral additional to: ‘The Devil and the King divide the prize, And sad Sir Balaam curses God and dies.’ (ll. 401-2)

== Epistle to Cobham ==
Addressing this poem to Viscount Cobham, Pope considers the knowledge and personality of various people, discussing the difficulty in reading the character of men. He visited Cobham’s house at Stowe in the summer of 1733, shortly after its owner had been dismissed by Walpole for writing a protest about Government policy. He then produced the poem, praising independence of mind as a fine public virtue.

Pope points out that books do not assist in reading character, while observation is misled, and our judgements are influenced by our own prejudices and tastes. Even a person’s actions may derive from something other than actual intention. He concludes that the best way to assess character is by discovering a ‘ruling passion’ (an idea previously found in An Essay on Man), which may appear most significantly at a person’s death, and which ‘clue once found unravels all the rest’ (l. 178). The ideal of this is, predictably, the recipient of the poem: ‘And you! Brave COBHAM, to the latest breath Shall feel your ruling Passion strong in death:’ (ll. 262-3)

== Epistle to a Lady ==
Martha Blount was one of two sisters who had been friends of Pope since 1707. Like him, she was from a Catholic background, and over the years he had visited the family frequently. His poem looks into the characters of women, in particular by describing four, supposedly pseudonymous, portraits. In three cases, however, the identity was fairly clear. Philomodé was Henrietta, Duchess of Marlborough, and Atossa was either Henrietta’s mother, Duchess Sarah, or else Catherine, Duchess of Buckingham, the illegitimate daughter of James II, while Cloe was the Countess of Suffolk, George II’s mistress.

The poem starts by apparently quoting Martha Blount: ‘Nothing so true as what you once let fall, “Most Women have no characters at all.”’ (ll. 1-2)

In fact, that view is disputed, first by reference to different portraits painted of ladies, and more importantly by varied aspects of female personality: ‘Ladies like variegated Tulips show; ‘Tis to their Changes half their charms we owe.’ (ll. 41-2) Philomedé talks of romance, but does not act it out. Atossa is angry and violent, but is eventually: ‘Sick of herself thro’ very selfishness!’ (l. 146) Cloe is the converse of this, a woman who ‘wants a Heart’, and hides in the formal social code, ‘Content to dwell in Decencies forever.’ (l. 164)

Martha herself, in contrast, is of a finer character altogether. God, he concludes, has given her ‘Sense, Good-humour, and a Poet’ (l. 292) to immortalise her.

It was not until 1744, when Pope died, that the portrait of Atossa was included in the published epistle, and it was alleged by Bolingbroke that Sarah, Duchess of Marlborough, had sought to suppress it, paying Pope £1,000 (perhaps £250,000 in current value).
