= Sampson Eure =

English lawyer and politician

Sir Sampson Eure (died 1659) was an English lawyer and politician who sat in the House of Commons at various times between 1621 and 1643. He supported the Royalist cause in the English Civil War.

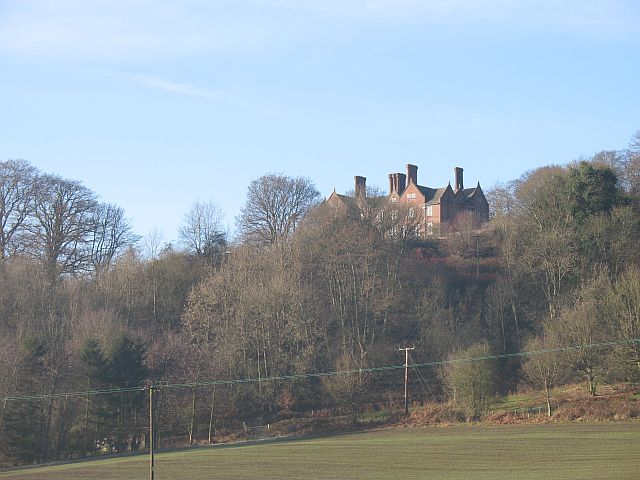
Gatley Park house

Eure was the son of Sir Francis Eure of Upper Heyford, Oxfordshire, and his first wife, Elizabeth. He was admitted at Gray's Inn on 10 August 1610 and called to the bar in 1617.

In 1621, Eure was elected member of parliament for Beaumaris. He was made Kings Attorney for Wales for life on 11 April 1622 and, together with Ralph Goodwin, was granted the office of Examiner in the Court of the Marches of Wales on 19 November 1625 . In 1638 he became a Bencher of his Inn and in 1640 was elevated to Serjeant-at-law and then King's Serjeant.

In November 1640, Eure was elected MP for Leominster in the Long Parliament. and was knighted on 7 August 1641.

When the Civil War was taking shape he made his way to join King Charles at Oxford and was created DCL (Doctor of Civil Law) there on 7 February 1643. He was also made Speaker of the King's Parliament in Oxford (as distinct from the de facto Parliament in Westminster). In consequence he was disabled from sitting in the House of Commons on 22 January 1644 and made to suffer, although not excessively, for his support of the King's cause.

Eure died at his home at Gatley Park, Herefordshire in 1659. He had married in 1633 Martha, the daughter of Anthony Cage of Longstow, Cambridgeshire and had one son, who predeceased him. He had bought Gatley Park in 1632 and built a new house there, which he left to his widow.

Parliament of England
Preceded by William Jones	Member of Parliament for Beaumaris; 1621–1622	Succeeded by Charles Jones
Preceded by William Smallman; Walter Kyrle	Member of Parliament for Leominster; 1640–1644; With: Walter Kyrle	Succeeded by Walter Kyrle; John Birch
