= An Essay on Man =

Poem by Alexander Pope

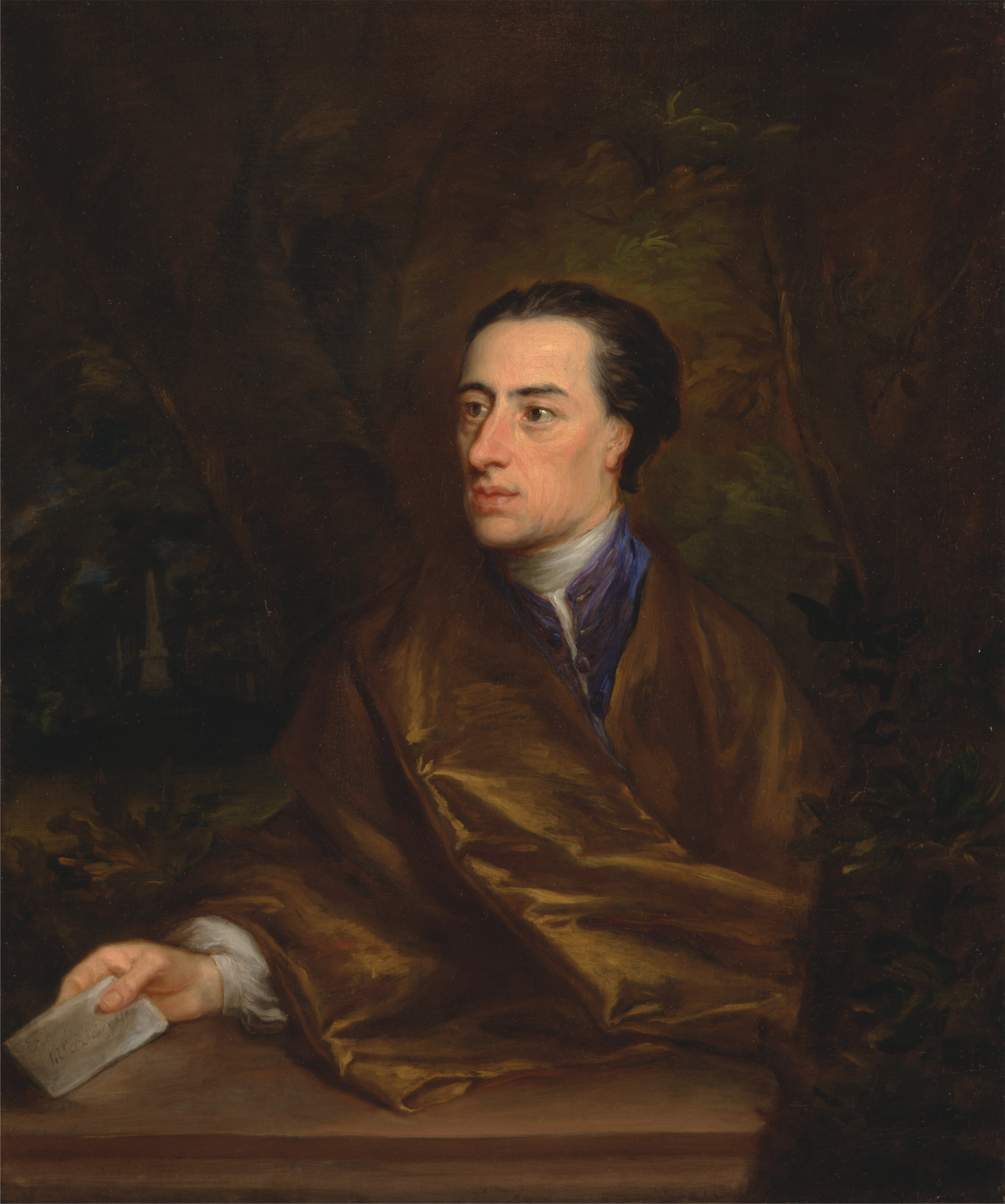
Alexander Pope in 1738. Portrait by Jonathan Richardson.

"An Essay on Man" is a poem published by Alexander Pope in 1733–1734. It is an effort to rationalize or rather "vindicate the ways of God to man" (l.16), a variation of John Milton's claim in the opening lines of Paradise Lost, that he will "justifie the wayes of God to men" (1.26). It is concerned with the natural order God has decreed for man. Because man cannot know God's purposes, he cannot complain about his position in the great chain of being (ll.33–34) and must accept that "Whatever is, is right" (l.292). More than any other work, it popularized optimistic philosophy throughout England and the rest of Europe.

== Structure and composition ==
The essay, written in heroic couplets, comprises four epistles. Pope began work on it in 1729, and had finished the first three by 1731. They appeared in early 1733, with the fourth epistle published the following year. The poem was originally published anonymously; Pope did not admit authorship until 1735.

The work was dedicated to Pope's friend Henry St John, 1st Viscount Bolingbroke, hence the opening line: "Awake, my St John..."

Pope's Essay on Man and his four poems Moral Essays were designed to be the parts of a system of ethics which he wanted to express in poetry, but never completed. Pope reveals in his introductory statement, "The Design", that An Essay on Man was originally conceived as part of a longer philosophical poem which would have been expanded on through four separate books.

According to his friend and editor, William Warburton, Pope intended to structure the work as follows: The four epistles which had already been published would constitute the first book. The second book was to contain another set of epistles which, in contrast to the first book, would focus on subjects such as human reason, the practical and impractical aspects of varied arts and sciences, human talent, the use of learning, the science of the world, and wit, together with "a satire against the misapplication" of those same disciplines. The third book would discuss politics and religion, while the fourth book was concerned with "private ethics" or "practical morality".

== Excerpt ==
The following passage, taken from the first two paragraphs of the opening verse of the second epistle, is often quoted by those familiar with Pope's work, as it neatly summarizes some of the religious and humanistic tenets of the poem:

Know then thyself, presume not God to scan;
The proper study of Mankind is Man.
Plac'd on this isthmus of a middle state,
A being darkly wise, and rudely great:
With too much knowledge for the Sceptic side,
With too much weakness for the Stoic's pride,
He hangs between; in doubt to act, or rest,
In doubt to deem himself a God, or Beast;
In doubt his Mind or Body to prefer,
Born but to die, and reas'ning but to err;
Alike in ignorance, his reason such,
Whether he thinks too little, or too much:
Chaos of Thought and Passion, all confus'd;
Still by himself, abus'd, or disabus'd;
Created half to rise, and half to fall;
Great lord of all things, yet a prey to all;
Sole judge of Truth, in endless Error hurl'd:
The glory, jest, and riddle of the world!
Go, wond'rous creature! mount where Science guides,
Go, measure earth, weigh air, and state the tides;
Instruct the planets in what orbs to run,
Correct old Time, and regulate the Sun;
Go, soar with Plato to th' empyreal sphere,
To the first good, first perfect, and first fair;
Or tread the mazy round his follow'rs trod,
And quitting sense call imitating God;
As Eastern priests in giddy circles run,
And turn their heads to imitate the Sun.
Go, teach Eternal Wisdom how to rule—
Then drop into thyself, and be a fool!

— Epistle II, lines 1–30

Pope's thesis here is that man has learnt about nature and God's creation through science; consequently, science has given man power, but having become intoxicated by this power, man has begun to think that he is "imitating God". In response, Pope declares the species of man to be a "fool", absent of knowledge and plagued by "ignorance" in spite of all the progress achieved through science. Pope argues that humanity should make a study of itself, and not debase the spiritual essence of the world with earthly science, since the two are diametrically opposed to one another: man should "presume not God to scan".

== Reactions and parodies ==
On its publication, An Essay on Man received great admiration throughout Europe. Voltaire called it "the most beautiful, the most useful, the most sublime didactic poem ever written in any language". In 1756, Rousseau wrote to Voltaire admiring the poem and saying that it "softens my ills and brings me patience". Kant was fond of the poem and would recite long passages from it to his students.

Later, however, Voltaire renounced his admiration for Pope's and Leibniz's optimism and even wrote a novel, Candide (1759), as a satire on their philosophy of ethics. Rousseau also critiqued the work, questioning "Pope's uncritical assumption that there must be an unbroken chain of being all the way from inanimate matter up to God".

The obscene poem An Essay on Woman was dedicated to the courtesan Fanny Murray and was a parody on Pope's poem. It was likely written in the 1750s by John Wilkes or his friend Thomas Potter and caused a scandal when it surfaced in 1763, leading to the downfall of Wilkes.

=== References in other works ===
The phrase "the hope that springs eternal" is used in the second stanza of "Casey at the Bat", a mock-heroic poem by Ernest Thayer, in order to humorously make the poem sound pretentious. It refers to the line "Hope springs eternal in the human breast" in the third stanza of the first epistle of An Essay on Man.
