= Ode on Solitude =

Poem by Alexander Pope

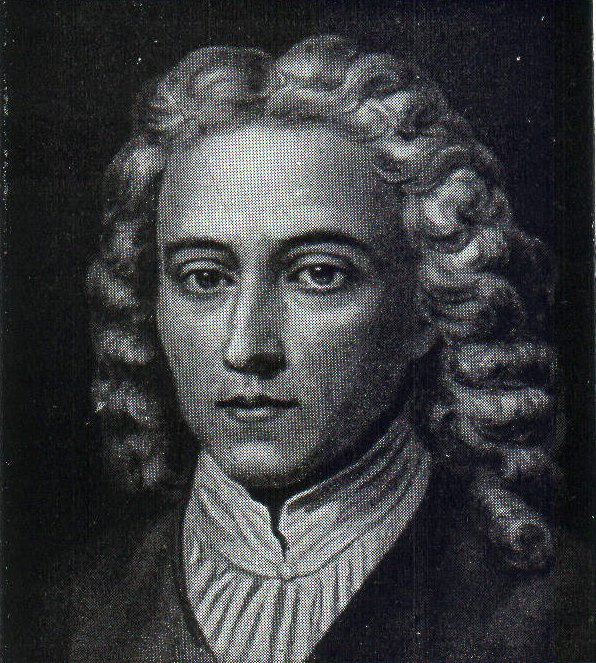
Alexander Pope wrote "Ode on Solitude" when he was twelve years old.

Ode on Solitude is a poem by Alexander Pope, written when he was twelve years old, and widely included in anthologies.

The title of this poem was also used by other poets, such as Joseph Warton.

== Poem ==
Happy the man, whose wish and care
A few paternal acres bound,
Content to breathe his native air,
In his own ground.

Whose herds with milk, whose fields with bread,
Whose flocks supply him with attire,
Whose trees in summer yield him shade,
In winter fire.

Blest! who can unconcern'dly find
Hours, days, and years slide soft away,
In health of body, peace of mind,
Quiet by day,

Sound sleep by night; study and ease
Together mix'd; sweet recreation,
And innocence, which most does please,
With meditation.

Thus let me live, unseen, unknown;
Thus unlamented let me die;
Steal from the world, and not a stone
Tell where I lie.
