= Characters and Observations =

Characters and Observations is an anonymous 18th-century manuscript that was discovered and published in 1930. The American edition was published by Frederick A. Stokes Company. According to the foreword by Lord Gorell, the handwritten manuscript was discovered in a piece of furniture by one John Murray in 1919, and ten years later shown to the editors of The Daily Mail, who suggested having it published. It was almost certainly owned by Alexander Pope, and is possibly his work. The title page of the manuscript had "A Pope. Twikeam." written on it.

The work consists of aphorisms, wisecracks, and longer-form descriptions of general subjects and personality types. The contents are arranged by subject, as follows:

- Benefits
- Gratitude
- Praise
- Censure
- Time
- Party
- The Pulpit and the Bar
- Alderman
- School-Master
- Physician
- Physician and Patient
- Law
- Books
- Knowledge and Learning
- Virtue
- Religion
- Offices
- Greatness
- Folly
- Pride
- Covetuousness (sic)
- Revenge
- Flattery
- Friendship
- Merit
- Youth and Old Age
- Sons and Daughters
- Courtship
- Woman
- Beauty
- Love
- Marriage
- Poverty
- Riches
- Heirs
- Family
- Kings
- Passions
- Meat and Drink
- Trade
- Compliments
- Custom
- Opinion
- Conversation
- Virtue
- Miscellaneous Thoughts

Several of the aphorisms were selected by John Gross for inclusion in his 1981 book The Oxford Book of Aphorisms.
