= Walter Kyrle =

English lawyer and politician

Walter Kyrle (c. 1600 – 10 February 1650) was an English lawyer and politician who sat in the House of Commons between 1640 and 1648.

Kyrle was the son of Robert Kyrle of Walford, Herefordshire. He matriculated at Oriel College, Oxford on 11 April 1617, aged 17. He was called to the bar at Middle Temple in 1625.

In April 1640, Kyrle was elected Member of Parliament for Leominster in the Short Parliament. He was re-elected MP for Leominster for the Long Parliament in November 1640 and sat until 1648 when he was excluded under Pride's Purge.

Kyrle lived at Ross-on-Wye, Herefordshire and died at the age of 50. He had married Alice, the daughter of John Mallett of Berkeley, Gloucestershire and had two sons, John Kyrle, known as "The Man of Ross", and Walter.

Parliament of England
Parliament suspended since 1629	Member of Parliament for Leominster; 1640; With: William Smallman 1640; Sampson Eure 1640–1643; John Birch 1646–1648	Succeeded by John Birch
