= Teresa Blount =

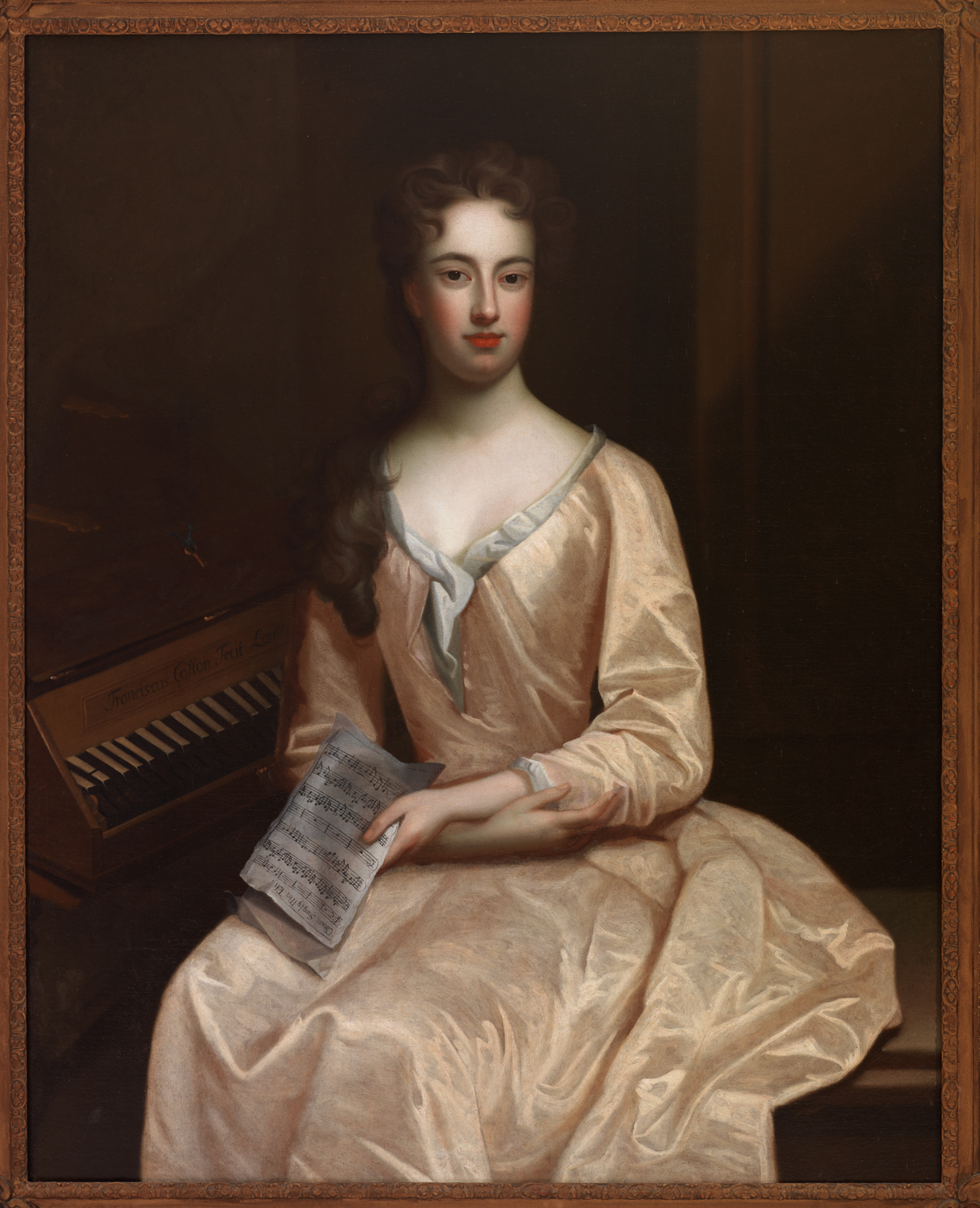
- Born: 15 October 1688; Paris
- Died: 7 October 1759 (aged 70)
- Occupation: gentlewoman
- Known for: muse to Alexander Pope

Teresa Blount (15 October 1688 – 7 October 1759) was an English Roman Catholic gentlewoman. She and her sister Martha Blount were friends with Alexander Pope. Martha was Pope's long-term friend but Teresa fell out with him in 1720.

== Life ==
Blount was born in Paris in 1688. Her family's seat was at Mapledurham House in Oxfordshire. Her parents were Martha (born Englefield) and Lister Blount. She and her elder sister were educated at the English Benedictine convent in Paris. Her family had long been of the highest position among Roman Catholic gentry, however the finances were poor and this became obvious when her father died. The family's ambitions were reduced and the first priority was to arrange a marriage for their younger brother. She and her sisters could have also married well but there was no money to support this idea.

She and her sister met Alexander Pope via an introduction by their mother's father, Anthony Englefield, in 1707. She was the more forward of the sisters and Pope wrote in her honour in 1710 in his "Epistle to Miss Blount, on her Leaving the Town, after the Coronation". This certainly addressed to Teresa as her sister had missed the coronation due to illness and it is likely that he also wrote You Know Where in the same year for her.

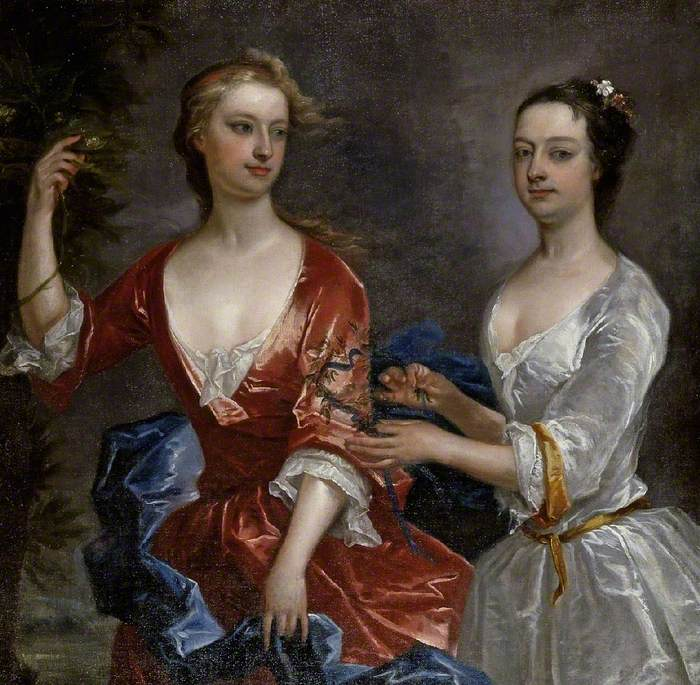
Martha and Teresa Blount aka "Pope's Favorites"

Her portrait was painted by Charles Jervas in a red dress sitting by a spinet or harpsichord holding the music for Climene by Mrs Toft. Jervas was a friend of Pope's and they exchanged letters about his paintings and "Sister Arts". Jervas also completed a painting of her cousin, Arabella Fermor, her sister and another of the two sisters together. The last painting was said to be of "Pope's Favorites".

By 1715 their brother was married and they moved out of Mapledurham House to live in London.

In 1718 Pope wrote Verses Sent to Mrs. T. B. with his Works. Pope made financial provisions for Teresa giving her a £40 annuity and she was annoyed by this. Pope continued his friendship with her sister but Pope and Teresa fell out in 1720.

== Death and legacy ==
She died after a long illness and she was buried in a traditional area for Catholics in "Old St Pancras" in London. Her sister died four years later and she was buried beside her. Teresa's will was seen to by her nephew Michael.
