= William Smallman =

English politician (c. 1615–1643)

William Smallman (c. 1615 – 1643) of Kinnersley Castle, Herefordshire was an English politician who sat in the House of Commons in 1640.

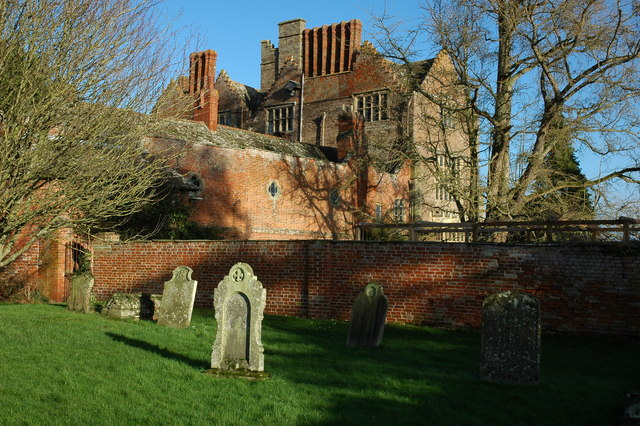
Kinnersley Castle, Herefordshire

Smallman was the son of Francis Smallman and his wife Susan Clarke, widow of John Clarke of London, and daughter of Fabian of Essex. His father was a lawyer who acquired Kinnersley Castle.

In April 1640, Smallman was elected Member of Parliament for Leominster in the Short Parliament. Smallman was one of the "Nine Worthies" – nine justices who formed the royalist leadership in Herefordshire in the summer of 1642. The other "worthies" were Sir William Croft, Wallop Brabazon, Thomas Wigmore of Shobden, Thomas Price of Wisterdon, Fitzwilliam Conningsby, Henry Lingen, William Rudhall and John Scudamore. Smallman died in 1643.

Smallman married Lucy Whitney daughter of Sir Robert Whitney on 29 September 1631 at St. Giles Cripplegate. They had two daughters: Constance, and Lucy who married James Pytts of Kyre Hall and inherited Kinnersley. Smallman's widow remarried in about 1648, to John Booth, son of John and Margery (Waiden) Booth of Durham.

Parliament of England
| Parliament suspended since 1629 | Member of Parliament for Leominster; 1640; With: Walter Kyrle | Succeeded by Sampson Eure; Walter Kyrle |
