= Cibber =

Cibber is a surname. Notable people with the surname include:

- Caius Gabriel Cibber (1630–1700), Danish sculptor; father of Colley Cibber
- Charlotte Cibber (1713–1760), English actress, playwright, novelist, autobiographer, and noted transvestite
- Catherine Cibber (1669–1734), British singer and actor
- Colley Cibber (1671–1757), British actor, playwright, and Poet Laureate; father of Charlotte and Theophilus Cibber
- Jane Cibber (1704/1706–1733), British actress
- Susannah Maria Cibber (1714–1766), English singer and actress; wife of Theophilus Cibber
- Theophilus Cibber (1703–1758), English actor, playwright and author
