= Pastorals (Pope) =

1709 poem written by Alexander Pope

- by Alexander Pope
- Rhyme scheme: Heroic couplet
- Metre: Iambic pentameter

Full text
- Pastorals (Pope) at Wikisource

Pastorals were some of the first poetical works of Alexander Pope to appear in print, when they were published in the sixth part of Jacob Tonson's Poetical Miscellanies on 2 May 1709. However, the Pastorals had been written earlier, in 1704, when the author was sixteen.

== Sources ==
- Gordon, Ian (11 March 2003). "Pastorals". The Literary Encyclopedia. Retrieved 30 March 2023.
- "Pastorals | work by Pope". Encyclopædia Britannica. Retrieved 30 March 2023.
