= Martha Blount =

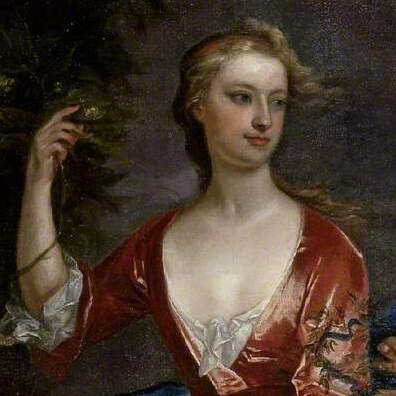
- Born: 15 October 1690
- Died: 12 July 1763 (aged 72)

Martha Blount (1690–1763) was an English woman, a friend of many English literary figures, especially Alexander Pope.

== Early life ==
Martha Blount was born on 15 June 1690 at the family seat, Mapledurham House at Mapledurham in Oxfordshire. Her parents were Martha (born Englefield) and Lister Blount. She and her elder sister Teresa were educated at the English Benedictine convent in Paris. Her family had long been of the highest position among Roman Catholic gentry.

== Pope and literary society ==
She and Teresa met Pope via an introduction by their mother's father, Anthony Englefield, in 1707.

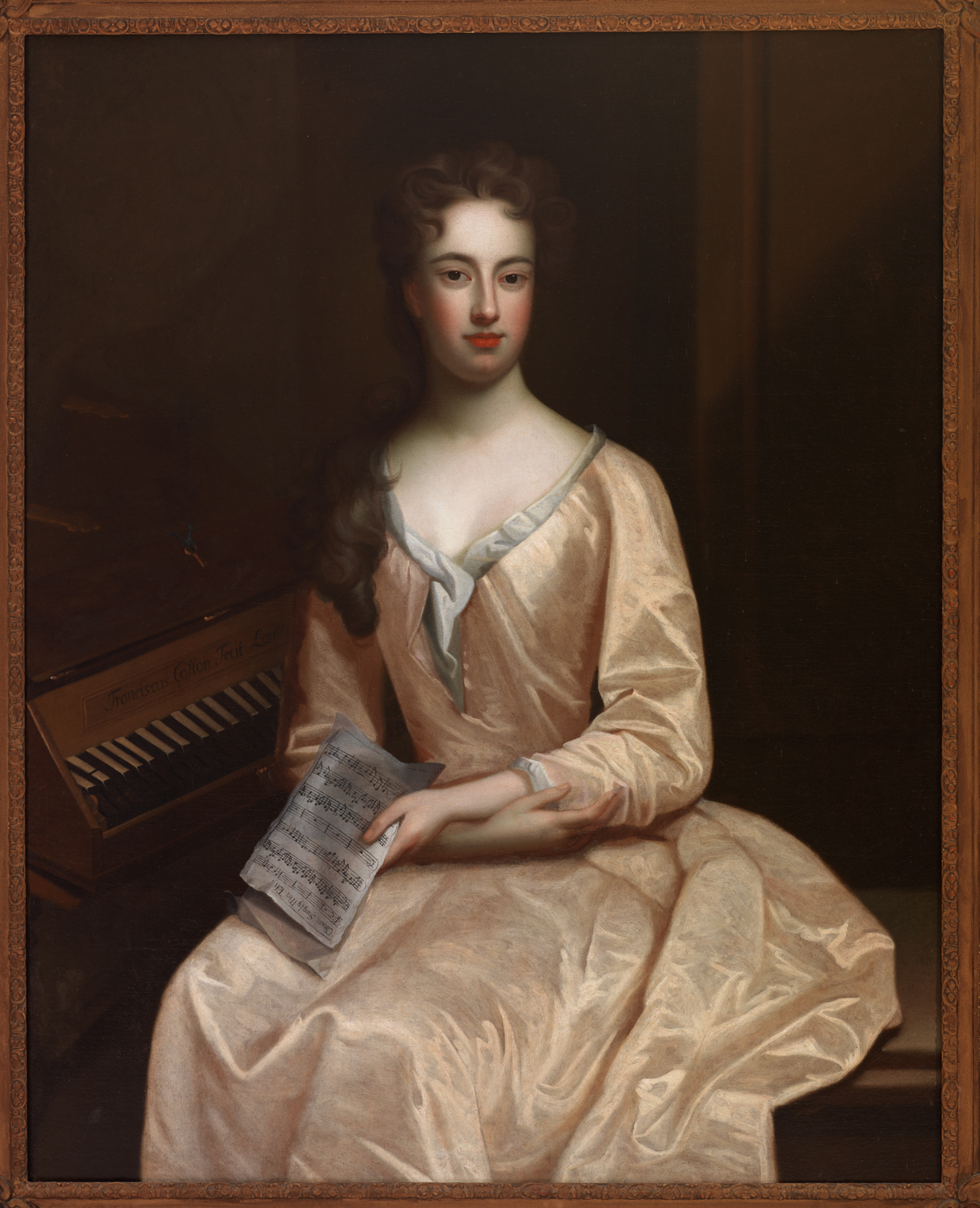
Teresa Blount, portrait by Charles Jervas

From 1710 to 1715 she continued to live at Mapledurham with her widowed mother, her brother Michael, and Teresa. During this period she and Teresa were prominent figures in the fashionable world. In 1712 Pope sent them his 'Rape of the Lock' and his ‘Miscellany’ (Carruthers, p. 79); in 1713 the sisters were corresponding with James Moore Smythe, author of the comedy The Rival Modes, he as Alexis, Teresa as Zephalinda, and Martha as Parthenissa; in 1714 Pope wrote to Martha from Bath that if she would come she would be the best mermaid in Christendom; in 1715 he had two fans painted for the sisters. John Gay called them "two lovely sisters" (Gay to Pope, Welcome from Greece), Pope spoke of their "endless smiles" (Epistle to Jervas, line 61) and of Martha's "resistless charms" (his Epistle to her with Voiture's works, line 59). In their portraits, still at Mapledurham, where they appear arm in arm, they both look very charming.

If Michael had died unmarried, Mapledurham would have become her property. However, in 1715, he married Mary Agnes, eldest daughter and coheiress of Sir Henry Joseph Tichborne, 4th Baronet, so Martha with her mother and sister thenceforth had a country residence at Petersham, costing £20 a year, and a town house, at one time in Bolton Street, at another in Welbeck Street (Pope to Caryll, 6 May 1733). The change in her fortunes called out Pope's warm pity. He had reason, too, to think that her mother, sister, and brother treated her unkindly; and though at first he was the friend of both sisters, having even settled 40l. a year on Teresa in 1717 for six years (Carruthers, p. 75), he quarrelled with the latter lady before long, and showed so much preference and partisanship for Martha, that it was the cause of rumours which seriously affected her honour. His ‘Birthday Poem’ to her in 1723 strengthened these rumours; his letters, however, vehemently declared them to be false (to Caryll, Christmas Day, 1725, &c.), and he attributed the scandal to Teresa. Pope, indeed, advised Martha to leave her mother and Teresa altogether when this calumny was abroad, but she refused the advice.

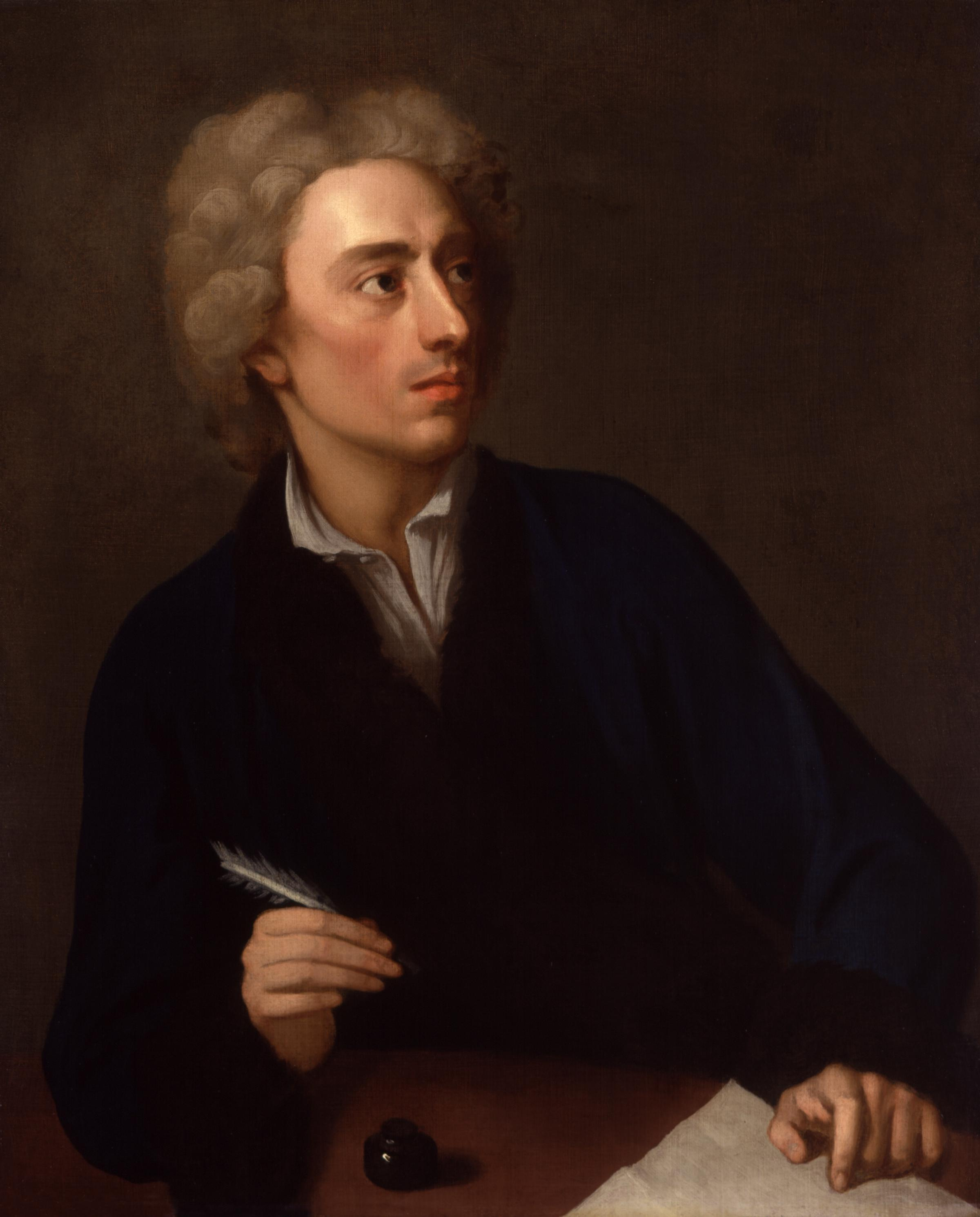
Alexander Pope

In 1732 Martha seems to have been seriously ill, under Dr. John Arbuthnot's care. In 1733 Pope's mother died, to whom Martha had always shown affectionate attention. In 1735 Pope dedicated his 'Epistle on Women' to her, telling her she had "sense, good humour, and a poet". In 1739 her brother died, leaving children to whom she was much attached. In 1743, after the death of her mother, she paid a memorable visit to the Allens at Prior Park, where Pope was staying. Ruffhead says she behaved during the visit in an arrogant and unbecoming manner; Warburton and Warton say she ‘took the huff’ because the Allens, as Protestants, refused to let their carriage take her to a Roman Catholic chapel; she says (Mapledurham MSS., Carruthers, p. 378): ‘They talk to one another without putting me at all into the conversation. . . . I'll get out of it as soon as I can.’ Pope defended her; called Mrs. Allen ‘a minx, and an impertinent one,’ and, after his own departure, advised her to ‘leave them without a word.’ Pope was seized with his last illness a few weeks after this unhappy episode. Ralph Allen went to see him, to find him still eager in Martha's defense.

Samuel Johnson related that during Pope's last illness "he was one day sitting in the air with Lord Bolingbroke and Lord Marchmont, [when] he saw his favourite Martha Blount at the bottom of the terrace, and asked Lord Bolingbroke to go and hand her up. Bolingbroke, not liking his errand, crossed his legs, and sat still; but Lord Marchmont, who was younger and less captious, waited on the Lady; who, when he came to her, asked, What, is he not dead yet?" Maynard Mack, Pope's definitive biographer, noted, "It is impossible to be sure whence Johnson had this story, so obviously intended to discredit Martha," and adds that "It would come quite plausibly . . . from any source close to Warburton, who hated Bolingbroke" and "did not care for Martha Blount." Mack takes a more sympathetic interpretation of Martha in this story, stating that, "To be sure, Martha may have made the remark in question and perhaps in these very words. One would still, before judging her, need to know how close in tone she came to 'What, is he not yet out of his pain?' —which is to say, 'Am I not out of mine?'"

Pope bequeathed her £1000, 60 of his books, his household goods, chattels, and plate, the furniture of his grotto, the urns in his garden, and the residue after all legacies were paid.

== Post Pope life ==
Miss Blount retained her place in the fashionable world after Pope's death. She lived at last in Berkeley Row, by Hanover Square, and there Henry Swinburne the traveller, her relative, visited her (Roscoe, i. 581 note). He found her a little, neat, fair, prim old woman, easy and gay in her manners. By her will she left the residue of her property to her "dear nephew," Michael Blount, of Mapledurham. She died 12 July 1763, aged 73. A pleasing portrait is in Ayre's Pope, vol. ii. facing page 17.

== Sources ==
Rumbold, Valerie (2004). "Blount, Martha (1690–1763)". Oxford Dictionary of National Biography. Oxford University Press.
