= Shobdon Court =

Country house in Herefordshire, England

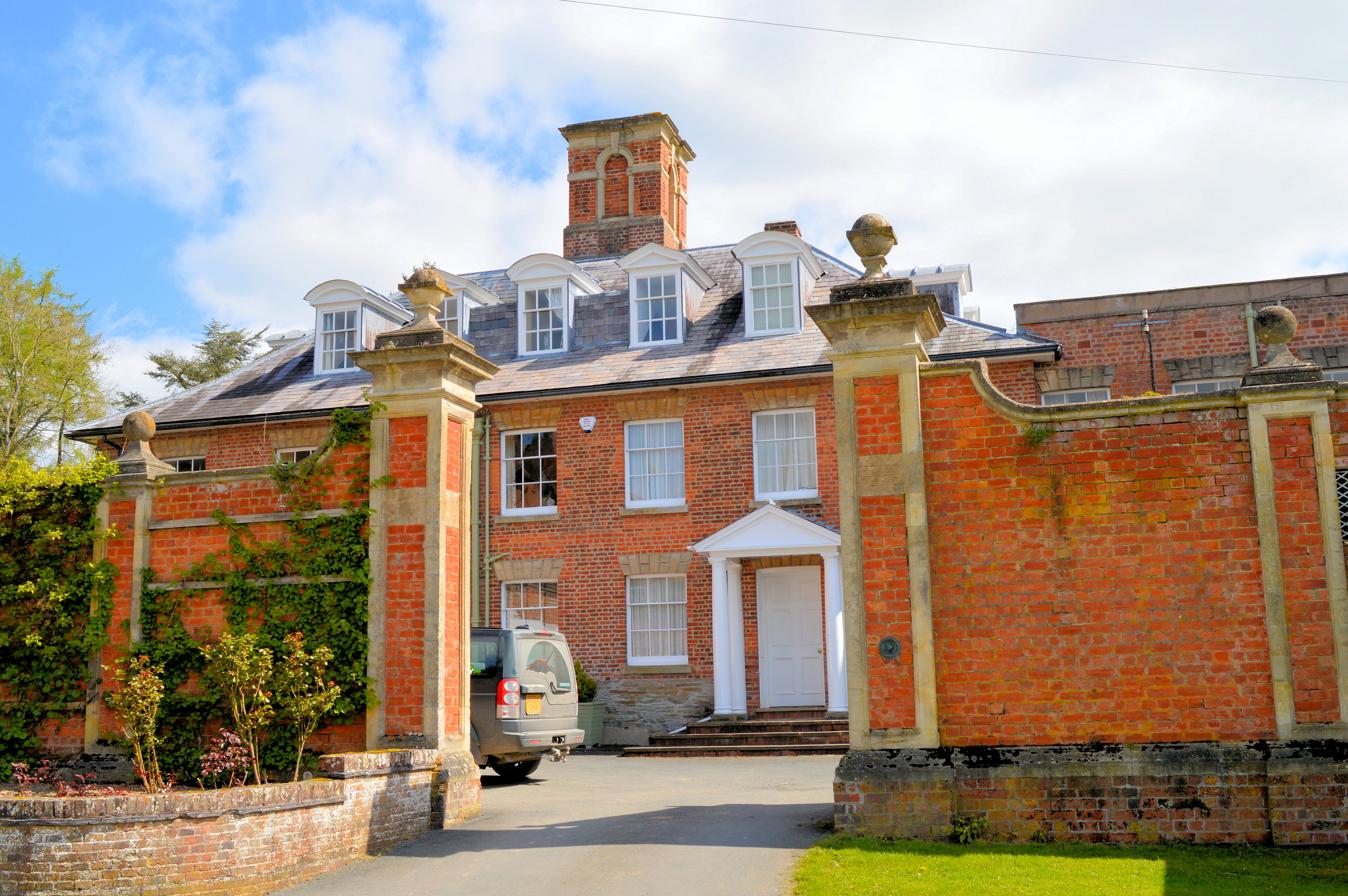
- Shobdon Court former service block

- Location within Herefordshire

General information
- Type: Country house
- Architectural style: Palladian
- Location: Shobdon, Herefordshire, England
- Coordinates: 52.2598°N 2.8788°W
- Completed: Early 18th century
- Renovated: Mid 19th century
- Owner: Bateman family (1705–1931)

Technical details
- Material: Brick

Shobdon Court was an 18th-century English country house in the village of Shobdon, near Leominster, Herefordshire. Although the main house has since been demolished, the service wing and the stable block have been converted to residential use.

Shobdon Court was rectangular in plan and sat in parkland on the side of a hill. Built of brick, it was similar in appearance to Clarendon House in London. It was substantially remodelled in the mid 1800s.

== History ==
The Shobdon estate was bought in 1705 by Sir James Bateman, Lord Mayor of London and Governor of the Bank of England, who replaced the Jacobean house with a new Palladian style building. On his death in 1718, it passed to his son William Bateman, 1st Viscount Bateman, and was inherited in turn by the latter's son, John Bateman, 2nd Viscount Bateman, who put it in the care of his brother Richard. When John died in 1802 the Viscountcy became extinct, and Shobdon Court passed to a relative, William Hanbury, who was ennobled as Baron Bateman in 1837 after having changed his name to Bateman-Hanbury.

The estate was passed down through the Bateman-Hanbury family until the 3rd Lord Bateman died in 1931. On his death, the Baronetage also became extinct, and the estate was sold. The Shobdon Court house was demolished in 1933, but the service and stable blocks were converted to apartments. Both the service block and the stable block are now Grade II listed buildings.

== World War II ==
During the Second World War, the remaining court buildings we requisitioned and formed the officers quarters for the then RAF Shobdon. One of the legacies of this was the construction of an on-site squash court, which still exists today.

== Church and arches ==
The estate's church, St John's, was completely rebuilt between 1749 and 1752 for John Bateman, 2nd Viscount Bateman, in a Rococo style. Simon Jenkins, in his book England's Thousand Best Churches, considers the interior "a complete masterpiece [of] English Rococo". It is a Grade I listed building.

Early 12th century arches from the interior of the original church were removed when it was rebuilt and used to form an eye-catcher in the grounds of the Court. They are a fine example of the Herefordshire School of carving.. The font, of the same period and school, was also removed to become a garden ornament but was later restored to the church and is the only Romanesque feature remaining there.
