= William Bateman-Hanbury =

William Bateman-Hanbury may refer to:

- William Bateman-Hanbury, 1st Baron Bateman (1780–1845)
- William Bateman-Hanbury, 2nd Baron Bateman (1826–1901)
- William Spencer Bateman-Hanbury, 3rd Baron Bateman (1856–1931), Baron Bateman

== See also ==
- William Bateman (disambiguation)
- Baron Bateman
