= John Bateman, 2nd Viscount Bateman =

British politician

The Right Honourable The Viscount Bateman

Viscount Bateman Baron Culmore
- Reign: 1744–1802
- Predecessor: William Bateman
- Born: April 1721
- Died: 2 March 1802 (aged 80)
- Noble family: Bateman
- Spouse: Elizabeth Sambroke
- Father: William Bateman, 1st Viscount Bateman
- Mother: Lady Anne Spencer

John Bateman, 2nd Viscount Bateman (April 1721 – 2 March 1802) was a British politician who sat in the House of Commons from 1746 to 1784.

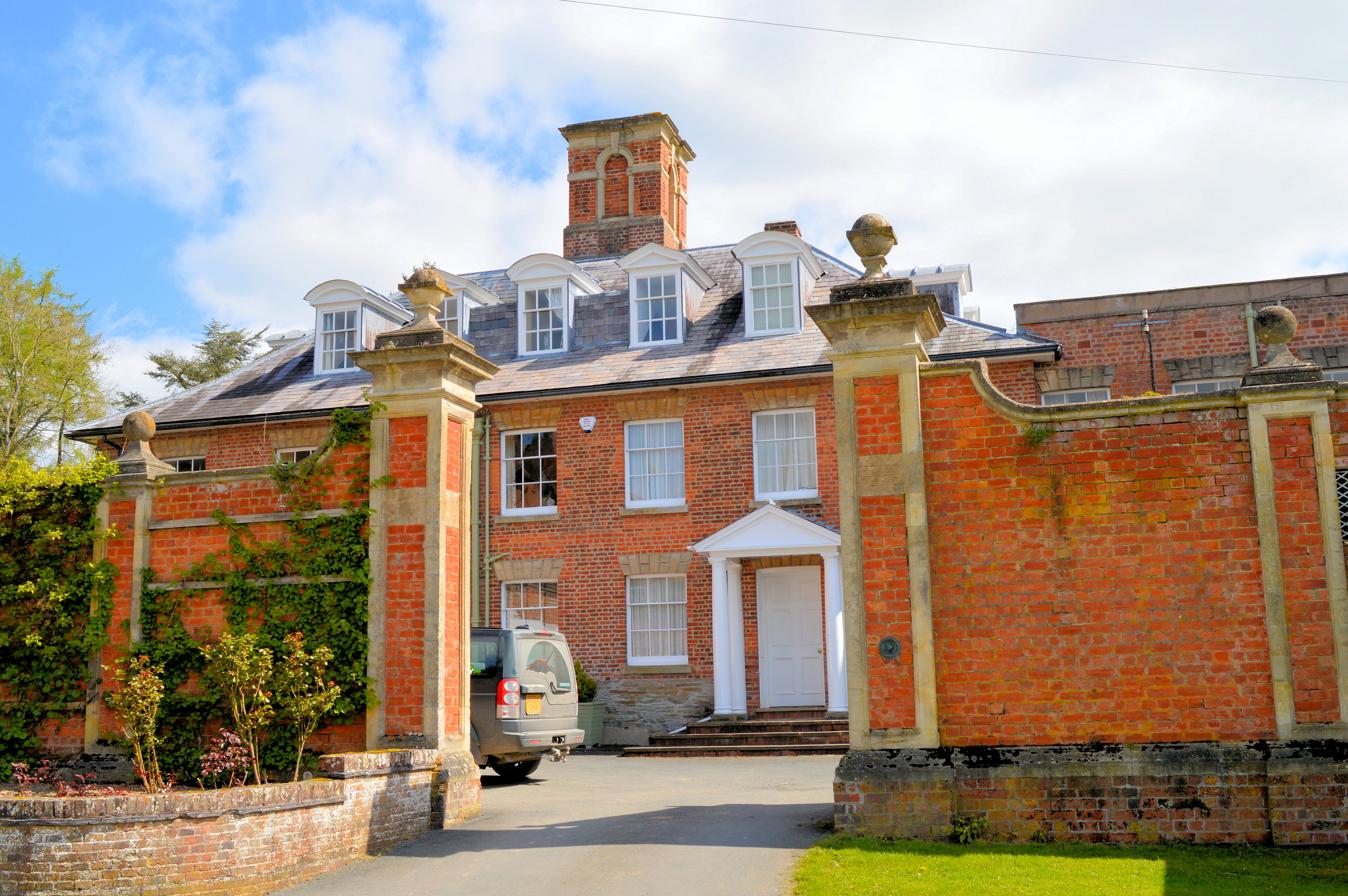
Shobdon Court service block

Bateman was the eldest son of William Bateman, 1st Viscount Bateman MP and his wife Lady Anne Spencer, daughter of Charles Spencer, 3rd Earl of Sunderland, and granddaughter of John Churchill, 1st Duke of Marlborough. He was commissioned an ensign in the 2nd Regiment of Foot Guards on 16 November 1740, retiring from the Army on 10 February 1741/2. In December 1744 on the death of his father, he succeeded as second Viscount Bateman. He married Elizabeth Sambroke, daughter of John Sambroke, MP on 2 July 1748.

The property Bateman inherited from his father (Shobdon Court, Herefordshire) gave him a parliamentary interest at Leominster and he was connected with the Marlborough, Bedford, and Pelham families through his mother. As the viscountcy was in the Peerage of Ireland, it did not disqualify him for election to the House of Commons of Great Britain. Lord Bateman was returned unopposed on the Treasury interest as Member of Parliament for Orford at a by-election on 31 January 1746. At the 1747 general election he was returned unopposed as MP for Woodstock on the interest of his uncle Charles, Duke of Marlborough.

Bateman was re-elected at Woodstock in 1754 and became Lord of the Admiralty in 1755 until 1756 when he was appointed Treasurer of the Household. He was appointed to the Privy Council on 19 November 1756. In 1761 he was again returned to Parliament for Woodstock. At the 1768 general election, the seat at Woodstock was required for Lord Robert Spencer, so instead, Bateman stood on his own interest at Leominster where he was returned unopposed. He was returned unopposed for Leominster again in 1774 and 1780. He stood down at the 1784 general election.

Lord Bateman was made Lord Lieutenant of Herefordshire in 1747, holding the post until his death. He was Master of the Buckhounds from 1757 to March 1782 and High steward of Leominster from 1759 to his death. Resident at Shobdon Court he was responsible for the complete rebuilding of St John's Church between 1749 and 1752.

On his death in 1802 at the age of eighty, the viscountcy became extinct. Shobdon Court passed to a relative, William Hanbury, who was created Baron Bateman in 1837 and adopted the surname of Bateman-Hanbury.

== Sources ==
- Brooks, Alan; Pevsner, Nikolaus (2012). Herefordshire. The Buildings of England. Yale University Press. ISBN 978-0-300-12575-7.

Parliament of Great Britain
Preceded by Lord Glenorchy; Henry Bilson-Legge	Member of Parliament for Orford; 1746–1747; With: Henry Bilson-Legge	Succeeded by Henry Bilson-Legge; Hon. John Waldegrave
Preceded by James Dawkins; Hon. John Trevor	Member of Parliament for Woodstock; 1747–1768; With: Hon. John Trevor to 1753; Anthony Keck 1753–67; William Gordon from 1767	Succeeded by William Gordon; Lord Robert Spencer
Preceded by Jenison Shafto; John Carnac	Member of Parliament for Leominster; 1768–1784; With: John Carnac to 1774; Thomas Hill 1774–76; Frederick Cornewall 1776–80; Richard Payne Knight 1780–84	Succeeded by John Hunter; Penn Assheton Curzon
Peerage of Ireland
Preceded by William Bateman	Viscount Bateman; 1744–1802	Extinct
