= William Bateman =

William or Bill Bateman may refer to:

- William Bateman (bishop) (c. 1298–1355), medieval bishop of Norwich
- William Bateman, 1st Viscount Bateman (1695–1744), British politician
- William H. Bateman, 19th-century Sandy Hook pilot boat
- Bill Bateman (cricketer) (1866–1935), Australian cricketer and businessman
- Bill Bateman (drummer) (born 1951), American drummer

== See also ==
- William Bateman-Hanbury (disambiguation)
