= Viscount Bateman =

Irish Peerage title

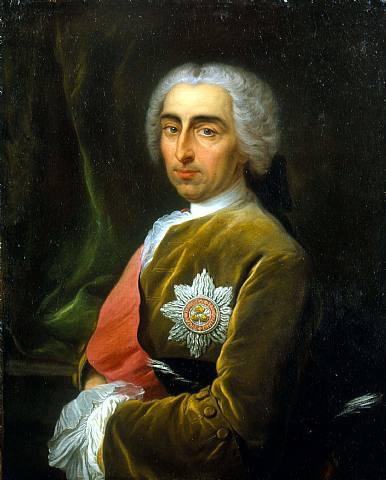
A possible portrait of William Bateman, 1st Viscount Bateman by Charles-André van Loo

Viscount Bateman was a title in the Peerage of Ireland. It was created on 12 July 1725 for William Bateman, previously Member of Parliament for Leominster and the son of Sir James Bateman, Lord Mayor of London from 1716 to 1717. He was made Baron Culmore, in the County of Londonderry, at the same time, also in the Peerage of Ireland. He was succeeded by his son, the second Viscount. He was also a politician and notably served as Treasurer of the Household between 1756 and 1757 and as Master of the Buckhounds between 1757 and 1782. He was childless and the titles became extinct on his death in 1802. As both the barony and viscountcy were Irish peerages, the holders sat in the House of Commons while holding the title.

The family estates were inherited by William Hanbury. He was the son of William Hanbury and Sarah, daughter of William Western and Anne, sister of the first Viscount Bateman. In 1837 he assumed by Royal licence the additional surname of Bateman and the same year the Bateman title was revived when he was raised to the peerage as Baron Bateman. See this title for more information.

The family seat was Shobdon Court, Shobdon, Herefordshire. The 2nd Viscount built Somerset House, in Park Lane.

The Barony of Culmore should not be confused with the earlier Irish Barony of Docwra of Culmore, created in 1621 for Sir Henry Docwra, 1st Baron Docwra of Culmore.

== Viscounts Bateman (1725) ==
- William Bateman, 1st Viscount Bateman (c. 1695–1744)
- John Bateman, 2nd Viscount Bateman (1721–1802)

== See also ==
- Baron Bateman
