= Baron Bateman =

Extinct barony in the Peerage of the United Kingdom

Baron Bateman, of Shobdon in the County of Hereford, was a title in the Peerage of the United Kingdom. It was created on 30 January 1837 for William Bateman, previously member of Parliament for Northampton. Born William Hanbury, he was the grandson of William Hanbury and Sarah, daughter of William Western and Anne, sister of William Bateman, 1st Viscount Bateman (a title which became extinct in 1802). Lord Bateman was succeeded by his eldest son, the second Baron. He held minor political office and served as Lord-Lieutenant of Herefordshire for many years. The title became extinct on the death of his childless son, the third Baron, in 1931.

Charles Bateman-Hanbury-Kincaid-Lennox, younger son of the first Baron, was a politician.

== Barons Bateman (1837) ==
- William Hanbury Bateman, 1st Baron Bateman (1780–1845)
- William Bateman Bateman-Hanbury, 2nd Baron Bateman (1826–1901)
- William Spencer Bateman-Hanbury, 3rd Baron Bateman (1856–1931)

== Arms ==
Coat of arms of Baron Bateman
Crest 1st out of a mural crown Sable a demi-lion Or holding in the dexter paw a battleaxe Sable helved Gold (Hanbury). 2nd a duck's head and neck between two wings Proper (Bateman). Escutcheon Quarterly 1st & 4th Or on a bend engrailed Vert plain cottised Sable in chief a crescent on a crescent for difference (Hanbury) 2nd & 3rd Or on a fess Sable between three Muscovy ducks Proper a rose of the field (Bateman). Supporters Two lions Argent gorged with plain collars each charged with a rose between two fleurs-de-lis Or and chains of the latter affixed to each collar and reflexed over the back. Motto Nec Prece Nec Pretio

== See also ==
- Viscount Bateman
