= Sir Archer Croft, 2nd Baronet =

British politician

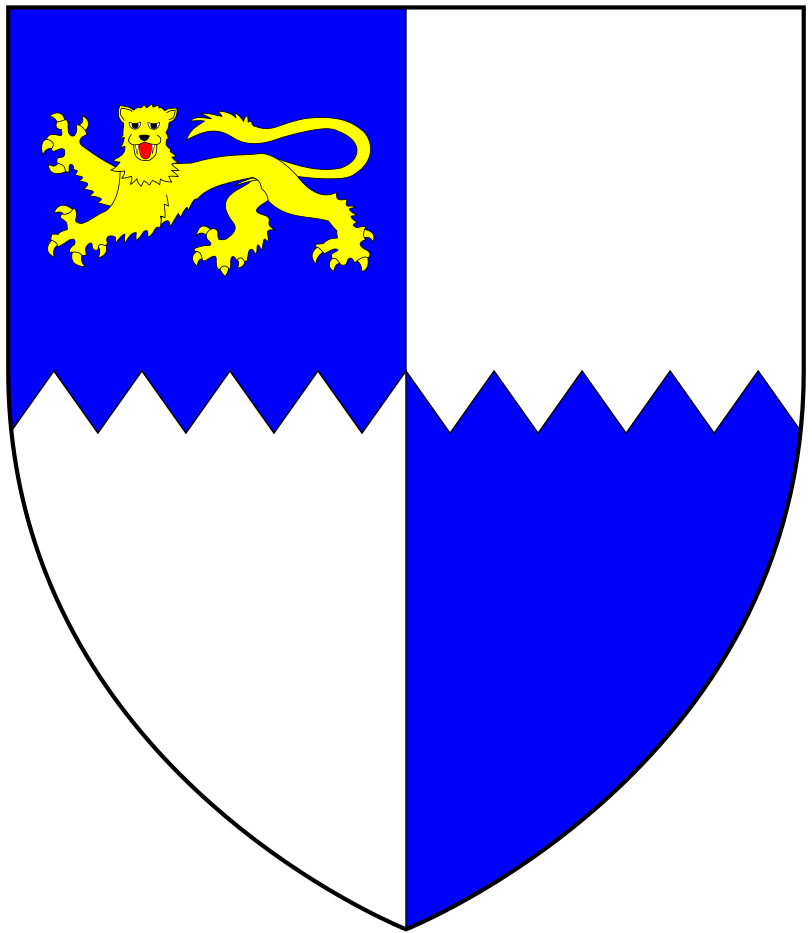
Arms of Croft, of Croft Castle, Herefordshire: Quarterly per fess indented azure and argent, in the 1st quarter a lion passant guardant or

Sir Archer Croft, 2nd Baronet (c. 2 March 1683 – 10 December 1753), of Croft Castle, near Leominster, Herefordshire, was a British politician who sat in the House of Commons from 1722 to 1734.

== Early life ==
Croft was the eldest son of Sir Herbert Croft, 1st Baronet and his wife Elizabeth Archer, daughter of Thomas Archer, MP of Umberslade, Warwickshire. He matriculated at New College, Oxford on 15 April 1702. In 1720 he succeeded to the baronetcy on the death of his father on 3 November. He married Frances Waring, daughter of Brigadier-General Richard Waring of Dunston Park, Berkshire on 10 January 1723.

== Career ==
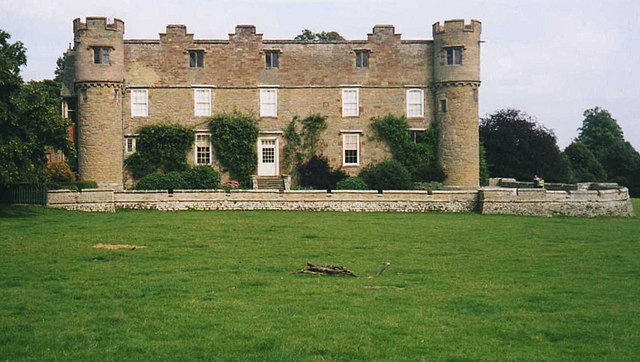
Croft Castle

Croft stood unsuccessfully for Leominster at the 1713 British general election. He was returned as Member of Parliament for Leominster at the top of the poll at the 1722 British general election. On the death of King George I in 1727 he expected Walpole to be ousted by Sir Spencer Compton whom he backed. On Walpole's continuance in office Croft wrote an apology and begged for a post in the Treasury. However he was defeated at the 1727 British general election although returned on the Treasury interest for Winchelsea at a by-election in 1728. He was also returned as MP for Bere Alston on the Drake interest at a by-election on 2 March 1728 and chose to sit at Bere Alston. He then applied for posts through Mrs Clayton, the Queen's favourite, but was unsuccessful. In Parliament, he made a number of speeches for the government and was rewarded with a post as Lord of Trade in 1730. At the 1734 general election, he was unable to find a seat. However he was allowed to retain his post as Lord of Trade until the fall of Walpole in 1742 when he resigned with a pension of £1,000 a year.

== Death and legacy ==
Croft died on 10 December 1753, having had three sons and a daughter. He was succeeded in the baronetcy by his son Archer Croft.

Parliament of Great Britain
Preceded by Edward Harley; William Bateman	Member of Parliament for Leominster; 1722–1727; With: Sir George Caswall	Succeeded by The Viscount Bateman; Sir George Caswall
Preceded by Robert Bristow; John Scrope	Member of Parliament for Winchelsea; 1728; With: Robert Bristow	Succeeded by Robert Bristow; Peter Walter
Preceded by Sir John Hobart, Bt; Sir Francis Drake, Bt	Member of Parliament for Bere Alston; 1728–1734; With: Lord Howard de Walden	Succeeded by William Morden; Lord Howard de Walden
Baronetage of England
Preceded by Herbert Croft	Baronet (of Croft Castle); 1720–1753	Succeeded by Archer Croft
