= Earl Coningsby =

Earldom in the Peerage of Great Britain

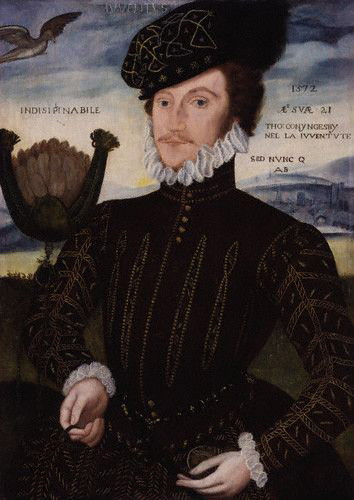
Sir Thomas Coningsby, ancestor of the Coningsby family.

Earl Coningsby was a title in the Peerage of Great Britain. It was created in 1719 for Thomas Coningsby, 1st Baron Coningsby, with remainder to his eldest daughter (by his second wife Lady Frances Jones), Margaret Newton, 1st Viscountess Coningsby, and the heirs male of her body. He was the great-grandson of the soldier and politician Sir Thomas Coningsby. Coningsby had already been created Baron Coningsby, of Clanbrassil, in the Peerage of Ireland in 1693, with normal remainder to heirs male, and Baron Coningsby in the Peerage of Great Britain in 1716, with the similar remainder as for the earldom. On Lord Coningsby's death in 1729 he was succeeded in the Irish barony of 1692 by his grandson Richard Coningsby, the second Baron, the son of one of Coningsby's sons from his first marriage to Barbara Georges. However, Richard died already the same year, when the barony became extinct. Lord Coningsby was succeeded in the English barony and the earldom according to the special remainder by his daughter Margaret Newton, 1st Viscountess Coningsby. She had already in 1716 been made Baroness Coningsby, of Hampton Court in the County of Hereford, and Viscountess Coningsby in her own right. Both titles were in the Peerage of Great Britain. Lady Coningsby was the wife of Sir Michael Newton, 4th Baronet, of Barrs Court and Culverthorpe Hall, Lincolnshire (see Newton Baronets). She had no surviving male issue and the titles became extinct on her death in 1761.

Lady Frances Coningsby, younger daughter of the first Earl by his second marriage, married Sir Charles Hanbury Williams. Their daughter Frances Williams married William Capel, 4th Earl of Essex. Their son George Capel-Coningsby, 5th Earl of Essex, assumed the additional surname of Coningsby on succeeding to the estates of his great-aunt, the Countess Coningsby.

The seat of the Coningsby family was Hampton Court, Herefordshire.

== Barons Coningsby (1692) ==
- Thomas Coningsby, 1st Baron Coningsby (1656–1729) (created Earl Coningsby in 1719)
- Richard Coningsby, 2nd Baron Coningsby (d. 1729)

== Earls Coningsby (1719) ==
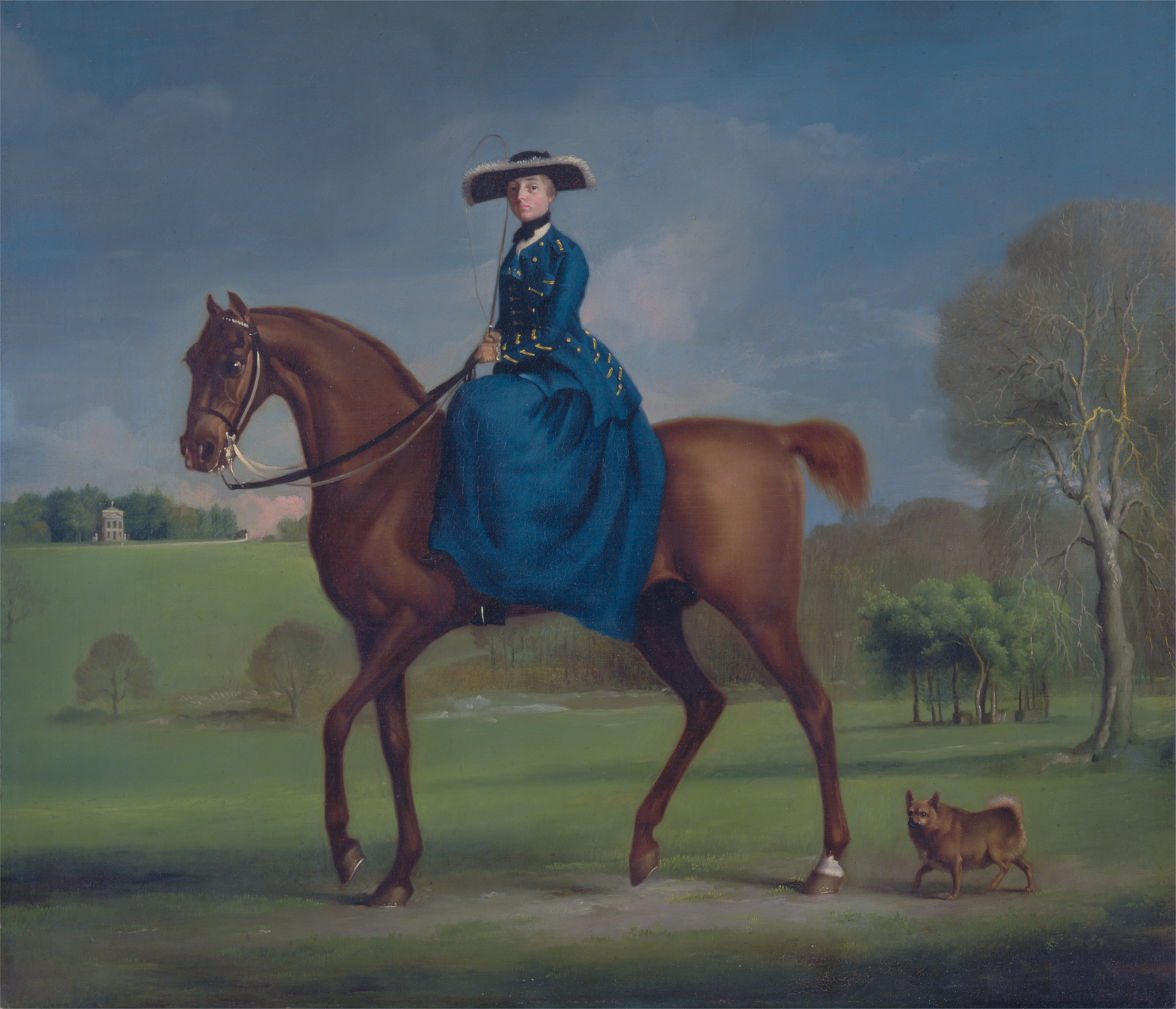
The Countess of Coningsby in the costume of the Charlton Hunt (George Stubbs, ca. 1760)

- Thomas Coningsby, 1st Earl Coningsby (1656–1729)
- Margaret Newton, 2nd Countess Coningsby (1709–1761)
  - John Newton (d. before 1732)

== In fiction ==
The character of Lady Jane Coningsby in the children's mystery novels, the Lady Grace Mysteries, is probably based on Jane, the daughter of Humphrey Coningsby (1516-1559) of Hampton Court in Herefordshire and his wife, Anne, sister of Sir Francis Englefield of Englefield House in Berkshire; and eventual wife of William Boughton (1543-1596) of Little Lawford at Newbold-on-Avon in Warwickshire. She appears as a maid of honour to Queen Elizabeth I and friend to the main character, Lady Grace Cavendish.

== See also ==
- Newton Baronets
- Earl of Essex
