= John Carnac =

British officer

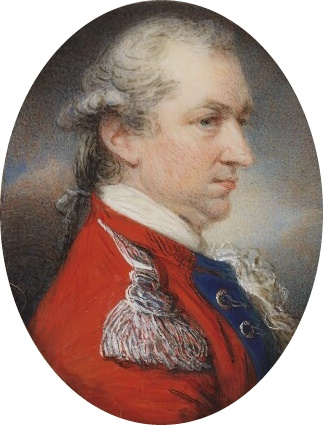
- Miniature of John Carnac (1786) by Ozias Humphry
- Born: c. 1721
- Died: 29 November 1800; Mangalore, Kingdom of Mysore
- Military career
- Allegiance: Kingdom of Great Britain
- Branch: British Army
- Rank: Brigadier General
- Commands: Indian Army

Brigadier-General John Carnac (c. 1721 – 29 November 1800) was a British officer who served three times as Commander-in-Chief of India.

== Early life ==
John Carnac was baptised in London on 12 April 1721. He was the son of Captain Peter Carnac (1665–1756), and Andrienne, née Lelonte (died c. 1762). His parents were French Huguenot immigrants. He had brothers called Pierre (Peter), Isaac and Scipio. The family moved to Dublin, where John studied at Trinity College, receiving his Bachelor of Arts degree in 1740. Later in his life, Carnac still corresponded with his family and their friends in French.

== Military career ==
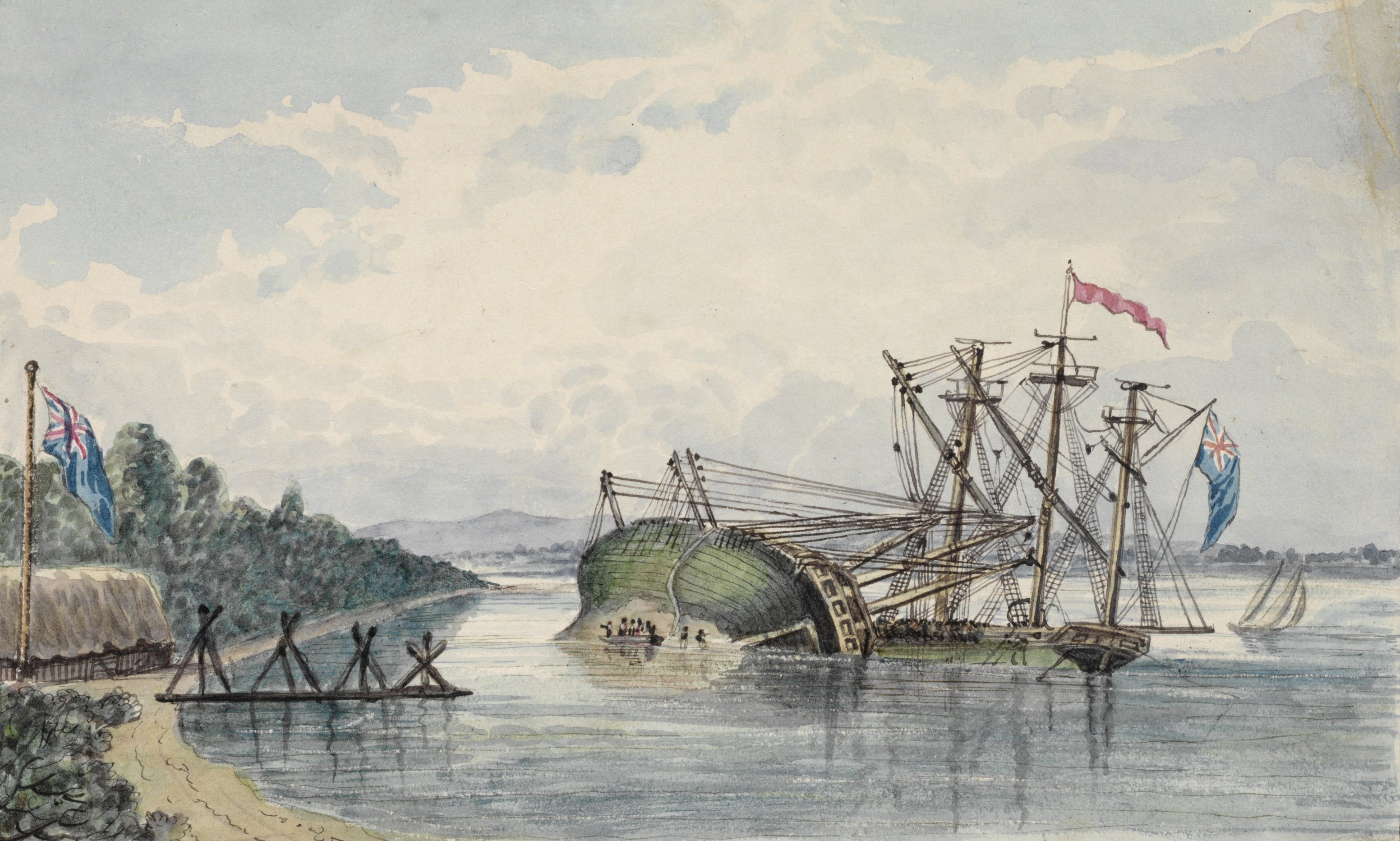
Success undergoing repairs after running aground on Carnac Reef, 1829-30

John Carnac voyaged to India as a lieutenant in the 39th Regiment in 1754 and served at Madras as secretary and aide-de-camp to the colonel of the regiment, John Adlercron. He joined the service of the East India Company as Captain in 1758 after transferring from the 39th foot. After his arrival in Bengal he became secretary and aide-de-camp to Robert Clive, governor of Bengal, and joined him in an expedition against the Prince Ali Gauhar, son of the Mughal emperor Alamgir II.

In 1761 he engaged with and defeated Shah Alam II. He became Brigadier-General in 1764 and participated with Clive in the negotiations with Shuja-ud-Daula and the Mughal emperor Shah Alam II in 1765.

In 1767, Carnac resigned from the company's service in January and returned to England. He purchased an estate near Ringwood in Hampshire and also participated in a largely unsuccessful housing development in Southampton. From 1768 to 1773 he served as M.P. for Leominster. In 1772 he was elected a Fellow of the Royal Society.

By 1773 Carnac was short of money and he returned to India as a member of the Council at Bombay. He was dismissed from the East India Company for his involvement in the Convention of Wadgaon in 1779 and died at Mangalore in November 1800.

== Family ==
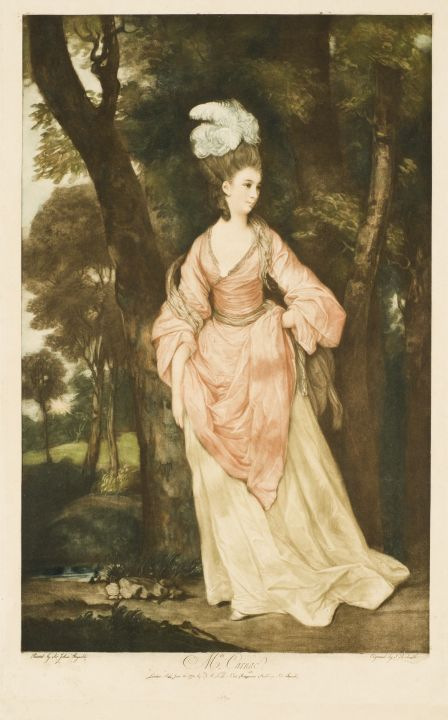
Illustration of the wife of John Carnac

In 1765 John Carnac married Elizabeth Woollaston. Then in 1769 he married Elizabeth Catherine Rivett (1751–80), daughter of Thomas Rivett (1713–63), who had been an MP and Mayor of Derby. A 1775–76 portrait of Mrs. Carnac by Sir Joshua Reynolds hangs in the Wallace Collection in London; a 1778 mezzotint engraving by John Raphael Smith after Reynolds' painting is at the Art Museum of Estonia, with a proof impression at the British Museum.

John Carnac's last will and testament made his brother-in-law James Rivett his heir, provided that he assumed the additional name of Carnac, which he did in 1801. Two of James's sons became famous: Sir James Rivett-Carnac, 1st Bt, became a Governor of Bombay Presidency, while Admiral John Rivett-Carnac became an early explorer of Australia, where Carnac Island was named in his honor by Captain James Stirling when Rivett-Carnac was first lieutenant on HMS Success on the Swan River expedition of 1827.

Parliament of Great Britain
Preceded by Edward Willes; Jenison Shafto	Member of Parliament for Leominster; 1768–1774; With: Jenison Shafto to March 1768; The Viscount Bateman from March 1768	Succeeded by The Viscount Bateman; Thomas Hill
