= George Caswall =

British banker and politician

Sir George Caswall (died 1742) of Muddiford Court, Fenchurch Street, London was a British banker and politician who sat in the House of Commons between 1717 and 1741.

Religiously a Baptist, Caswall was the eldest son of James Caswall of Leominster, Herefordshire. He married Mary Brassey, daughter of John Brassey, a banker of Lombard Street, London. He became a partner in the firm Turner, Sawbridge and Caswall, bankers, operating as the Sword Blade Company of which he was a Director in 1701. The Sword Blade Company were bankers to the South Sea Company of which he became a Director in 1711.

Caswall was elected as Whig Member of Parliament for Leominster, at a by-election on 19 March 1717. The election was declared void on 30 May on account of Caswall's bribery, but Caswall was returned again at the rerun on 17 June 1717. He was knighted on 10 February 1718. He lost his Directorship of the South Sea Company in 1718, but was Sheriff of London from 1720 to 1721.

The South Sea Company collapsed in 1720 and Caswall as a representative of the bank, was deemed to have played a significant part in running the scheme which led to collapse. A Parliamentary committee was set up in 1721 to investigate, and his specific offence was the acquisition – free of charge – of £50,000 of stock in the company while its formation was before parliament. Caswall was one of seven members expelled from the House of Commons and in addition a bill was introduced requiring Turner, Caswall & Co to make a restitution of £250,000. This bill, which would have broken Caswall, passed initial parliamentary stages but lapsed after parliament was prorogued. In the aftermath of the scandal, Caswall was involved in protracted legal proceedings against Henry Bentinck, 1st Duke of Portland. Despite being expelled, Caswall was elected again for the seat of Leominster at the 1722 general election. He was re-elected in 1727 and 1734. He stood down at the 1741 general election in favour of his son John. He was a director of the Royal African Company in 1742.

Caswall's wife died on 8 August 1721, and he married secondly, before 1731, Mary Brassey, widow of Thomas Brassey. He left two sons by his first wife.

Parliament of Great Britain
Preceded by Edward Harley; Lord Coningsby	Member of Parliament for Leominster; 1717–1721; With: Edward Harley	Succeeded by Edward Harley; William Bateman
Preceded by Edward Harley; William Bateman	Member of Parliament for Leominster; 1722–1741; With: Sir Archer Croft 1722–1727; William Bateman 1727–1734; Robert Harley 1734–1741	Succeeded by Robert Harley; John Caswall
