= Thomas Coningsby, 1st Earl Coningsby =

English politician (1656–1729)

Thomas Coningsby, 1st Earl Coningsby PC
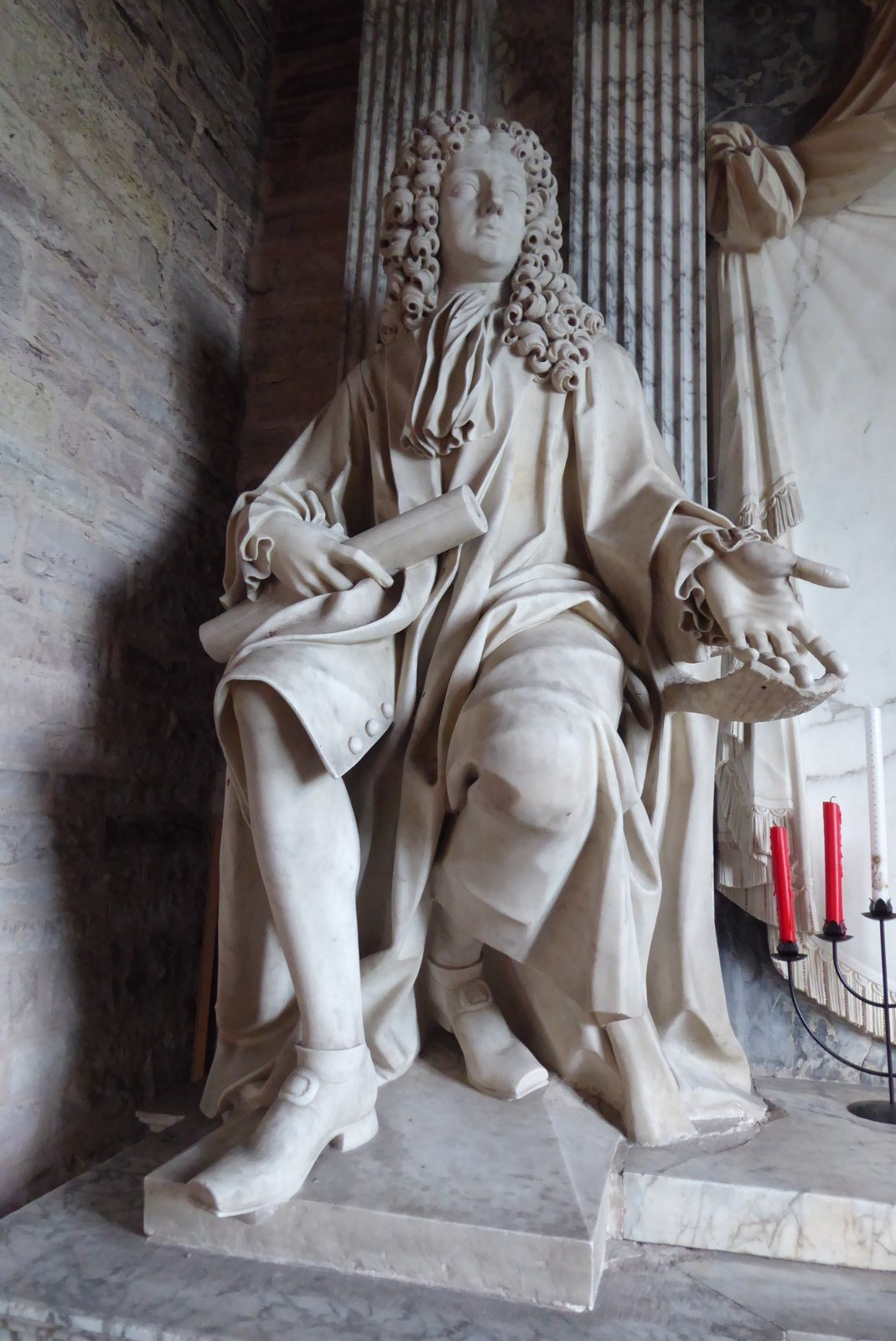
- Effigy in St Mary's church, Hope under Dinmore

Member of the English Parliament for Leominster
- In office 1679–1707 Serving with: John Dutton Colt 1679–1685, 1689–1698, 1701; Robert Cornewall 1685–1689; Edward Harley 1698–1701, 1701–1707
- Preceded by: James Pytts; John Dutton Colt
- Succeeded by: Parliament of Great Britain

Member of the Great Britain Parliament for Leominster
- In office 1707–1710 Serving with Edward Harley
- Preceded by: Parliament of England
- Succeeded by: Edward Bangham; Edward Harley

Member of the Great Britain Parliament for Leominster
- In office 1715–1717 Serving with Edward Harley
- Preceded by: Henry Gorges; Edward Harley
- Succeeded by: George Caswall; Edward Harley

Personal details
- Born: 2 November 1656
- Died: 1 May 1729 (aged 72) Hampton Court Castle, Herefordshire, England
- Resting place: Hope under Dinmore church
- Parent: Humphrey Coningsby (father)

Thomas Coningsby, 1st Earl Coningsby PC (2 November 1656 – 1 May 1729) of Hampton Court Castle, Herefordshire, was an English politician who sat in the House of Commons at various times from 1679 until 1716 when he was created a peer and sat in the House of Lords

== Early life ==
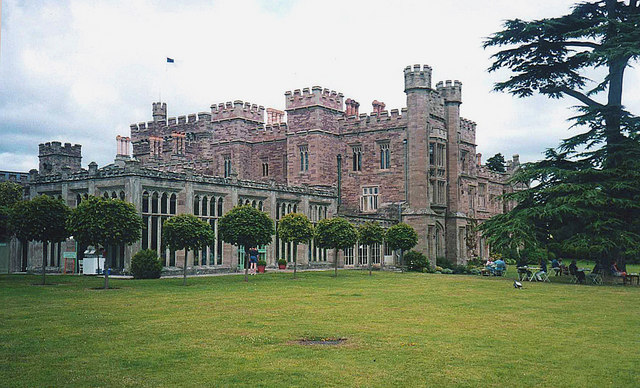
Hampton Court, Herefordshire

Coningsby was the son of Humphrey Coningsby of Hampton Court, and his wife Lettice Loftus, eldest daughter of Sir Arthur Loftus of Rathfarnham, Ireland. He was the great-grandson of Sir Thomas Coningsby.

In 1679, Coningsby was elected Member of Parliament for Leominster. He represented the constituency continuously until 1710, He was re-elected in 1715 and sat until his elevation to the British peerage.

== Royal allegiance ==
=== William III ===
Coningsby was an ardent supporter of the revolution of 1688, and opposed the Jacobite faction. Coningsby accompanied William III to Ireland, and was present at the battle of the Boyne where the King was injured. He was appointed joint receiver and Paymaster General of the forces employed in the reduction of Ireland, and from 1690 to 1692 he acted as the junior of the three Lord Justices. He established a network of friends and allies in Ireland, notably Sir John Hely, the Chief Baron of the Irish Exchequer, who had married his sister-in-law Meliora Gorges. It is said that he helped arrange the treaty of Limerick. His political opponents accused him of having used his position for profiteering by the embezzlement of stores, the appropriation of the estates of rebels, the sale of pardons, and dealings in illicit trade. However, the most serious charge was that he had illegally ordered the summary execution by hanging of a man named Gaffney. Gaffney was an embarrassment to Coningsby because he had witnessed a murder, the perpetrator of which had obtained an acquittal by bribing the administration.

Such charges were of slight moment so long as the royal influence was at Coningsby's back. King William created him Baron Coningsby of Clanbrassil in Ireland on 17 April 1692, and promoted him to privy councillor on 13 April 1693. King William also indicated that he would grant Coningsby a pardon under the Great Seal of Ireland for any transgressions which he might have committed while in office in Ireland.

Despite this his opponents, particularly the Earl of Bellomont and James Hamilton, sought to impeach him in the Westminster parliament in December 1693, along with his ally Sir Charles Porter. This and a similar motion in the Lords were defeated and in May 1694 he received the Royal pardon promised the previous year.

From 1695 to his death he held the office of chief steward of the city of Hereford, an appointment which involved him in a duel with Lord Chandos, another claimant of the post, "but no mischief was done". In April 1697 he received a grant under the Privy Seal of several of the crown manors in England, and in October 1698 he was again created the vice-treasurer and paymaster of the forces in Ireland.

=== Anne ===
During Queen Anne's reign he acted consistently with the whigs, but his services received slight acknowledgement even when his friends were in office. Godolphin only wrote an occasional civil letter complimenting Lord Coningsby on 'his judgment and experience' in parliamentary affairs, and it was not until October 1708 that Coningsby was sworn of Anne's privy council. He was one of the managers of Henry Sacheverell's trial, and, like most of the prominent whigs, he lost his seat in parliament as a result of the ensuing tory reaction.

=== George I ===
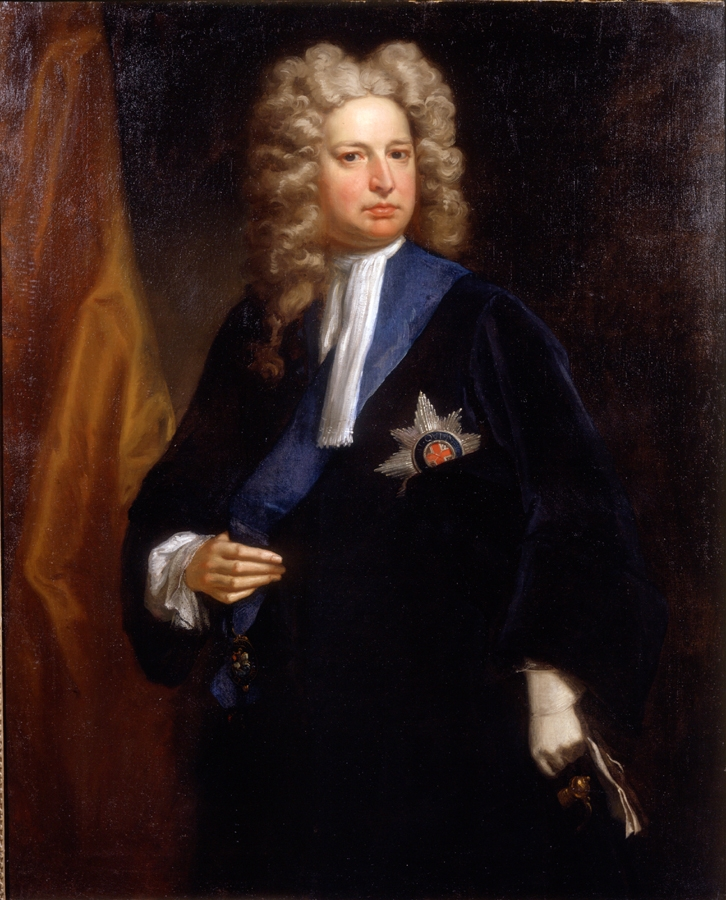
Former first minister Robert Harley circa 1710. Coningsby moved the motion for his impeachment and strongly advocated for his conviction. The two families had a long-standing rivalry in Herefordshire politics.

When George I acceded to the throne, Coningsby resumed his old position in public life, and enjoyed court favour. He was included in the select committee of twenty-one appointed to inquire into the negotiations for the treaty of Utrecht, and, according to Prior, was one of the three most inquisitive members of that body.

As a result of their investigations, the impeachment of Bolingbroke was moved by Robert Walpole and that of Harley by Coningsby – a family feud had long existed between the two Herefordshire families of Harley and Coningsby – and Ormonde's by Stanhope. Coningsby was a staunch advocate of prosecuting Harley for High Treason, and carried news of the Commons' resolution to the House of Lords where he forcefully laid out the charges against Harley.

Two years later Harley was unanimously discharged, but this concord of opinion was only obtained by Coningsby and some others withdrawing from the proceedings. He was well rewarded for his zeal on behalf of the Hanoverian succession. He became Lord Lieutenant of Herefordshire in November 1714, and Lord Lieutenant of Radnorshire in the following month.

Coningsby was granted a barony in the English peerage on 18 June 1716, and he was raised to a higher rank as Earl Coningsby on 30 April 1719.

== Legal difficulties and death ==
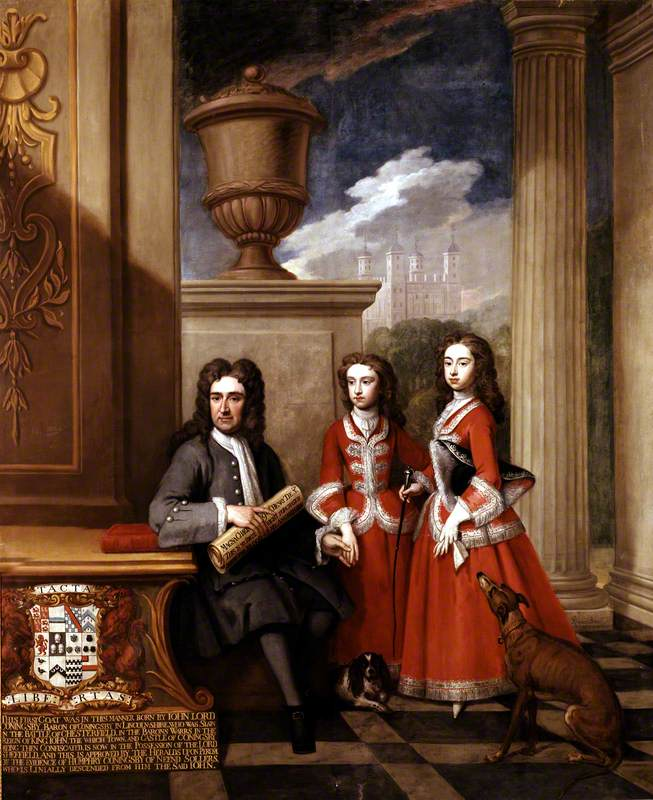
Coningsby in 1722 with two of his daughters

In the later years of his life, Coningsby suffered many difficulties. He was a widower, without any male heir, and subject to innumerable lawsuits. For some severe reflections on Lord Harcourt, the Lord Chancellor, in connection with these legal worries, he was, as Swift notes in his diary, committed to the Tower of London on 27 February 1720. Coningsby's troubles in law arose from his purchase of the manors of Leominster and Marden. After elaborate investigations, he convinced himself that the lord's rights had in many instances been trespassed upon by the copyhold tenants. He caused ejectments to be brought against many persons for being in possession of estates as freehold which he claimed to be copyhold, and as these claims were resisted by the persons in possession, his last days were embittered by constant strife. His collections concerning Marden were printed in 1722–1727 in a bulky tome, without any title page, and with pagination of great irregularity, but were never published. When his right to the Marden property was disputed, all the copies of this work but a few were destroyed. Through his sharpness of temper, he was exposed to the caustic sallies of Atterbury in the House of Lords, and to the satires of Swift and Pope in their writings.

After having been in ill health for some time, Coningsby died at Hampton on 1 May 1729. and was buried at Hope-under-Dinmore church in 1729, under a marble monument, on which the child's death is depicted in striking realism.

== Family ==
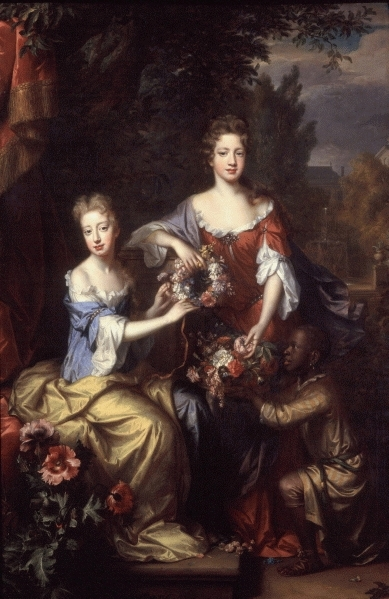
Coningsby's second wife, Lady Frances Jones, and her twin sister Lady Catherine Jones by Willem Wissing, 1687

Coningsby married Barbara Gorges, daughter of Ferdinando Gorges, of Eye Manor in Herefordshire, who had been a merchant in Barbados, and his wife Meliora Hilliard. The marriage licence was applied for to the vicar-general of the Archbishop of Canterbury on 18 February 1674/5, when Coningsby was described as aged about nineteen, and Barbara Gorges was stated to be about eighteen years old. Gorges, though he claimed to have made a fortune in Barbados, was considered by his son-in-law to be a financial schemer who had contrived to marry off his eldest daughter to him (Coningsby) to secure for himself some of the Coningsby estates. Coningsby claimed that Gorges' financial scheming caused him ruinous loss, from which he never recovered. Despite the ill-feeling Coningsby felt towards the Gorges family, he and Barbara had four daughters and three sons. His grandson by this marriage succeeded to the Irish barony, but died without issue on 18 December 1729.

Barbara died in November 1697. Coningsby's second wife, whom he married in April 1698, was Lady Frances Jones, daughter of Richard Jones, 1st Earl of Ranelagh, by whom he had one son, Richard, who died at Hampton on 2 April 1708 when two years old, choked by a cherrystone; and two daughters, Margaret and Frances. The second countess was buried at Hope-under-Dinmore on 23 February 1715, aged 42.

The grant of his earldom contained a remainder for the eldest daughter of his second marriage. Her issue male, John, the only child of this daughter, Margaret Newton, 2nd Countess Coningsby, by her husband Sir Michael Newton, died an infant, the victim of an accidental fall, said to have been caused through the fright of its nurse at seeing an ape, and on the mother's death in 1761 the title became extinct. Frances, the younger daughter of Lord Coningsby married Sir Charles Hanbury Williams, a well-known satirical poet, and was buried in the chapel of St. Erasmus, Westminster Abbey, in December 1781.

Hampton Court Castle passed via the younger daughter Frances to his great-grandson George Capell-Coningsby, 5th Earl of Essex.

== Bibliography ==
- Rogers, Pat. The Life and Times of Thomas, Lord Coningsby: The Whig Hangman and his Victims. A&C Black, 2011.

Parliament of England
Preceded by James Pytts; John Dutton Colt	Member of Parliament for Leominster; 1679–1707; With: John Dutton Colt 1679–1685, 1689–1698, 1701; Robert Cornewall 1685–1689; Edward Harley 1698–1701, 1701–1707	Succeeded by Parliament of Great Britain
Parliament of Great Britain
Preceded by Parliament of England	Member of Parliament for Leominster; 1707–1710; With: Edward Harley	Succeeded by Edward Bangham; Edward Harley
Preceded by Henry Gorges; Edward Harley	Member of Parliament for Leominster; 1715–1717; With: Edward Harley	Succeeded by George Caswall; Edward Harley
Honorary titles
Preceded by The Duke of Kent	Lord Lieutenant of Herefordshire; 1714–1721	Succeeded by The Duke of Chandos
Preceded by The Earl of Oxford and Mortimer	Custos Rotulorum of Radnorshire; 1714–1721	Succeeded by The Duke of Chandos
Preceded by The Earl of Pembroke	Lord Lieutenant of Radnorshire; 1715–1721	Succeeded by The Duke of Chandos
Peerage of Great Britain
New creation	Earl Coningsby; 1719–1729	Succeeded by Margaret Newton
New creation	Baron Coningsby; 1716–1729	Succeeded by Margaret Newton
Peerage of Ireland
New creation	Baron Coningsby; 1692–1729	Richard Coningsby
