= Frederick Cornewall (1752–1783) =

English lawyer and politician

Frederick Walker Cornewall (13 April 1752 – 28 April 1783) was an English lawyer and politician who sat in the House of Commons between from 1776 to 1783.

Cornewall was born in Ludlow on 13 April 1752, the eldest surviving son of Captain Frederick Cornewall and his wife Mary Herbert, and went to school at Eton College. In 1770, aged 18, he was admitted as a Pensioner on 17 May and as a Fellow-commoner on 21 October to St John's College, Cambridge. He did not graduate, but was admitted to Lincoln's Inn on 19 May 1773 and called to the bar in 1788.

Cornewall was returned unopposed as a Tory Member of Parliament for Leominster at a by-election on 26 September 1776. He may have had the patronage of Lord Powis. In the 1780 general election, he was elected to represent Ludlow. He also became Bailiff of Ludlow in the same year.

When Francis Walker of Ferney Hall (a cousin of Frederick's mother) died without a direct heir, he left the bulk of his estate to Cornewall on condition that he add the name of Walker to his own. This he did, becoming Frederick Walker Cornewall on 21 July 1781. However he died before coming into possession of his new estates, so the inheritance passed to his younger brother, who became Folliott Herbert Walker Cornewall. The subject and his heir inherited the manuscripts of Edward Herbert of Cherbury whose descendants later sold them to Bernard Quaritch.

Cornewall died, unmarried, on 28 April 1783 (aged 31). He is buried in the family tomb in Diddlebury.

Parliament of Great Britain
Preceded by Thomas Hill; The Viscount Bateman	Member of Parliament for Leominster; 1776–1780; With: The Viscount Bateman	Succeeded by Richard Payne Knight; The Viscount Bateman
Preceded by Viscount Villiers; The Lord Clive	Member of Parliament for Ludlow; 1780–1783; With: The Lord Clive	Succeeded by Somerset Davies; The Lord Clive
