= St John's Church, Shobdon =

Coordinates: 52.2605°N 2.8788°W

- Church of St John the Evangelist, Shobdon
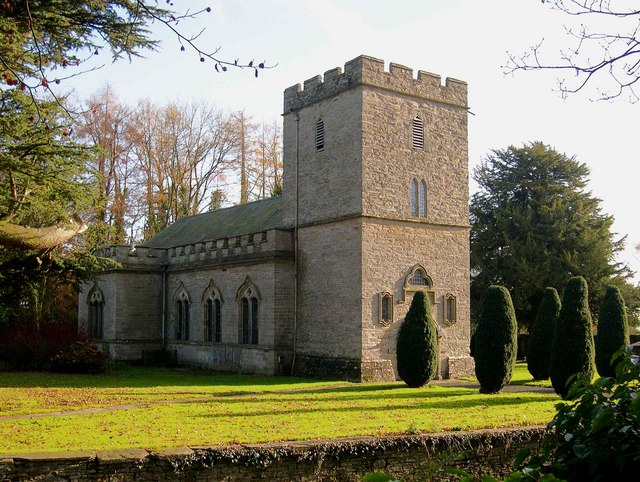
- Church of St John, Shobdon

- Location in Hereford
- OS grid reference: SO 40114 62847
- Location: Shobdon, Herefordshire
- Country: England
- Denomination: Anglican

History
- Status: Parish church

Architecture
- Functional status: Active
- Heritage designation: Grade I
- Designated: 11 June 1959
- Architectural type: Church

Administration
- Diocese: Diocese of Hereford
- Parish: Shobdon

Clergy
- Vicar: Revd Prebendary Steve Hollinghurst

The Church of St John is a Church of England parish church at Shobdon in the English county of Herefordshire. Of medieval origins, the church was completely rebuilt between 1749 and 1752 for John Bateman, 2nd Viscount Bateman, in a Rococo style under the supervision of Bateman's uncle, The Honourable Richard Bateman, a close friend of Horace Walpole, and a member of his Committee of Taste. Simon Jenkins, in his book England's Thousand Best Churches, considers the interior "a complete masterpiece (of) English Rococo," while Brooks and Pevsner describe it as "the finest 18th century church in Herefordshire." It is a Grade I listed building.

== History ==
Historic England states that the rebuilt church is "probably C14" whilst also referring to C12 elements removed in the rebuilding. Other sources detail the architectural and documentary evidence for the 12th century. Brooks and Pevsner, in the Herefordshire volume in the Buildings of England series, revised and reissued in 2012, record the building's origin as an Augustinian priory, established in around 1135. The Corpus of Romanesque Sculpture in Britain and Ireland also gives an establishment date of the 1130s. Between 1749 and 1752, John Bateman undertook a complete rebuilding in the Gothic Revival style. The architect is unknown. Bateman's uncle was a friend of Horace Walpole and many members of their circle have been suggested as possible designers, including William Kent, Daniel Garrett, Stephen Wright, John Vardy, Richard Bentley, William Robinson and Henry Flitcroft. Jenkins himself favours Richard Bentley. The style is clearly influenced by the contemporary Strawberry Hill House and the works of Batty Langley.

Arches from the interior of the original church were removed at the time of rebuilding to form an eye-catcher in the grounds of Shobdon Court, the Bateman family home.

The church remains an active parish church, part of the Arrowvale Group of churches. The Parochial Church Council is supported by The Shobdon Church Preservation Trust, established to ensure; "The preservation and upkeep of St John the Evangelist Parish Church, Shobdon, a Grade I listed building, and the education of the public in the history and architecture of the church."

== Description ==
=== Exterior ===
The exterior is of "coursed rubble with a slate roof." and with a standard arrangement of nave, transepts and chancel. Ogee arches for windows and door cases proliferate. The short tower contains a belfry.

=== Interior ===
The exterior does not anticipate the "icing-sugar whiteness" of the interior, with "Gothick, Rococo even Chinoiserie flourishes."

=== Shobdon Arches ===
The Shobdon Arches is an eyecatcher created in the park at the time of the reconstruction of the church. They include material from the original church, notably the chancel arch. The Shobdon Arches have subsequently "weathered disastrously." The Arches is a Grade II listed building and a scheduled monument.

== Gallery ==
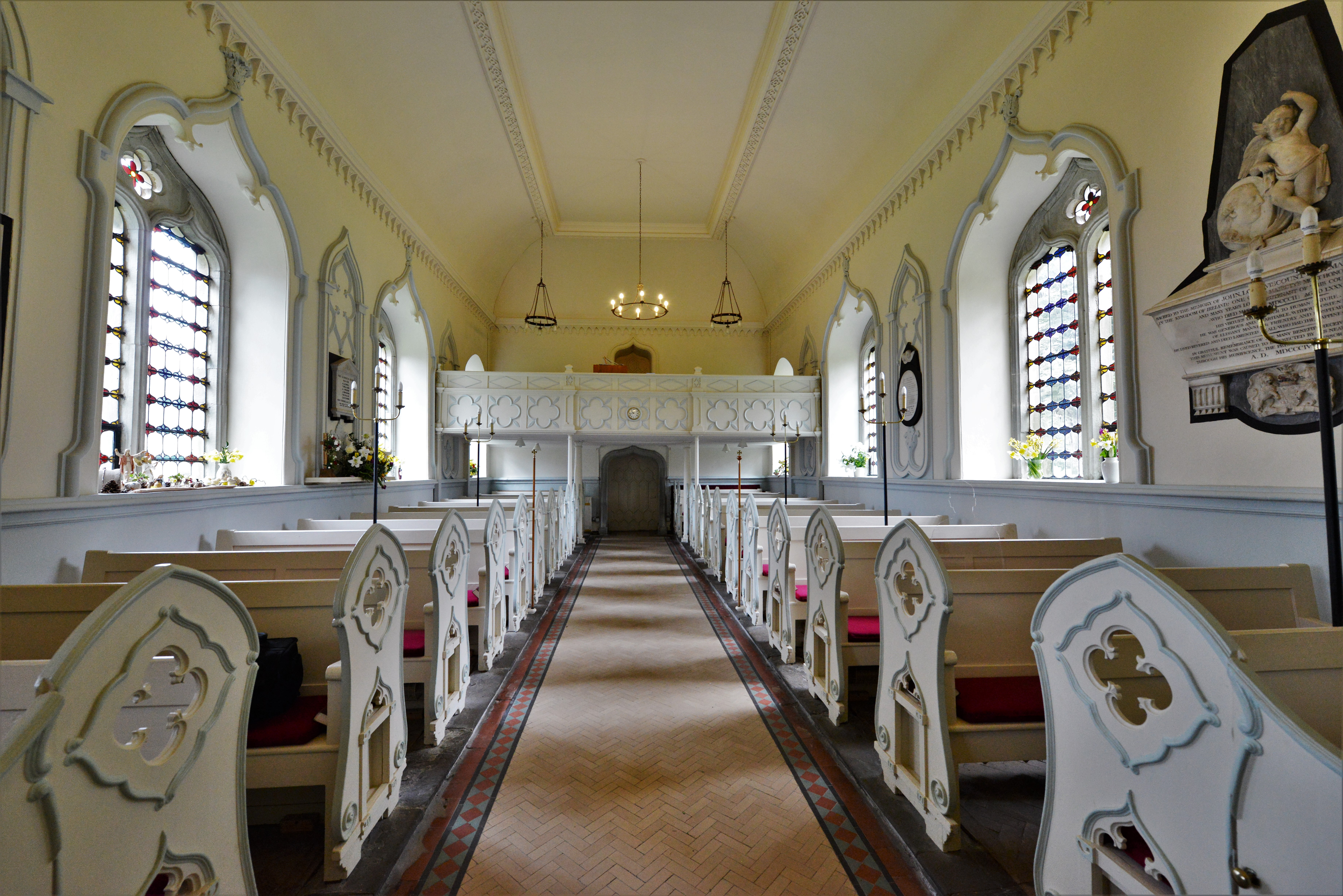
The Interior - "a masterpiece of English Rococo"

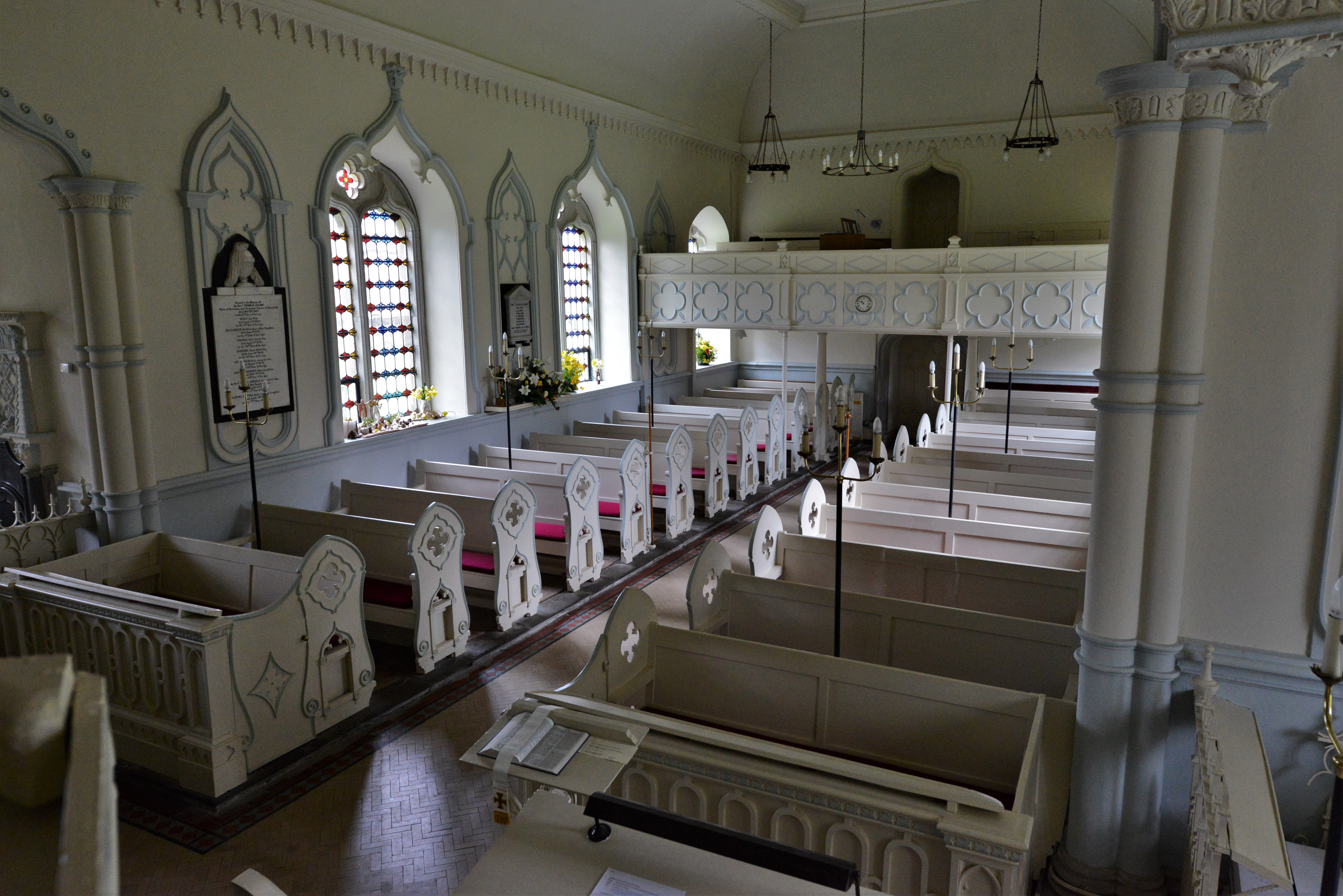
Another interior view

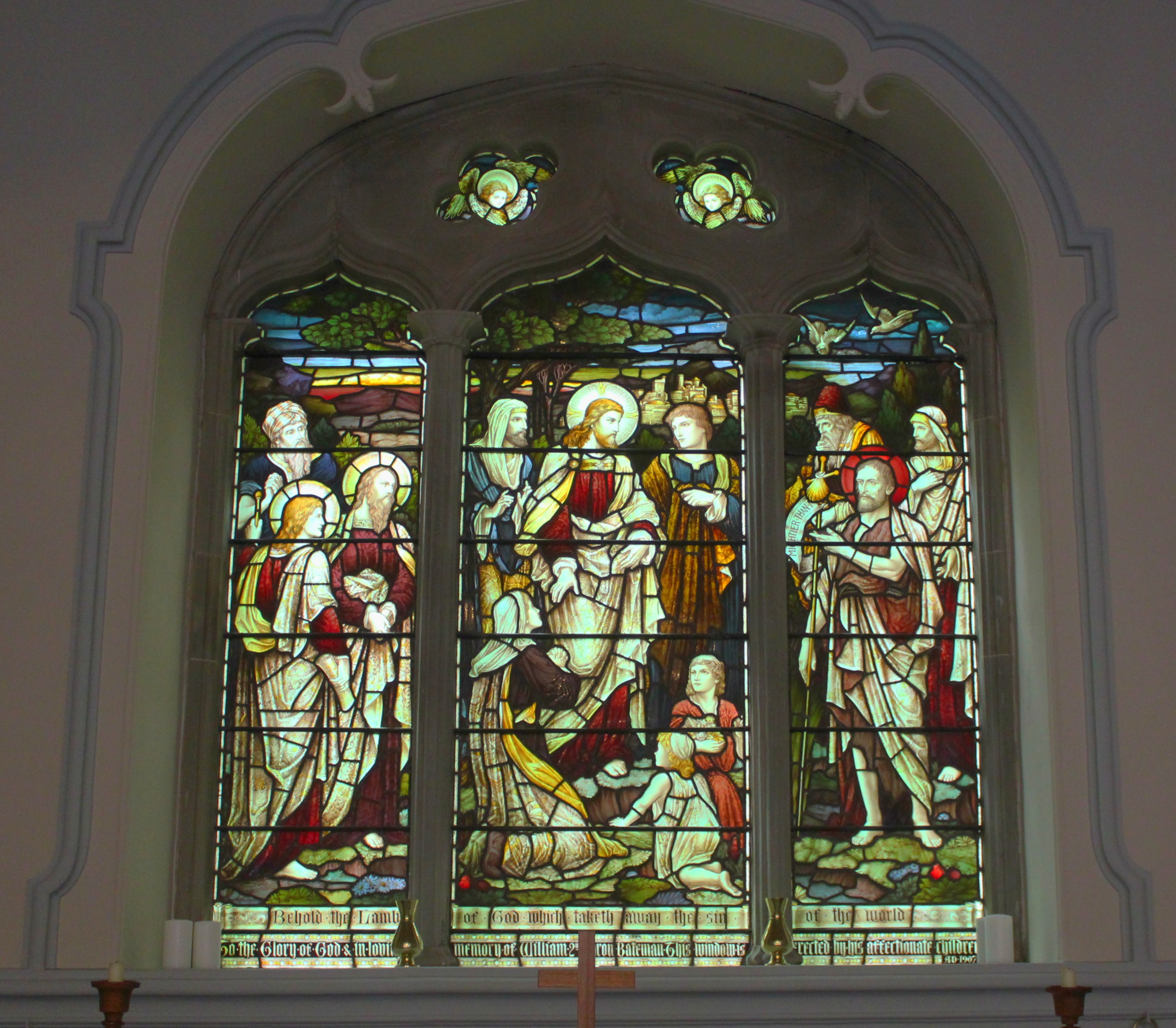
The East window

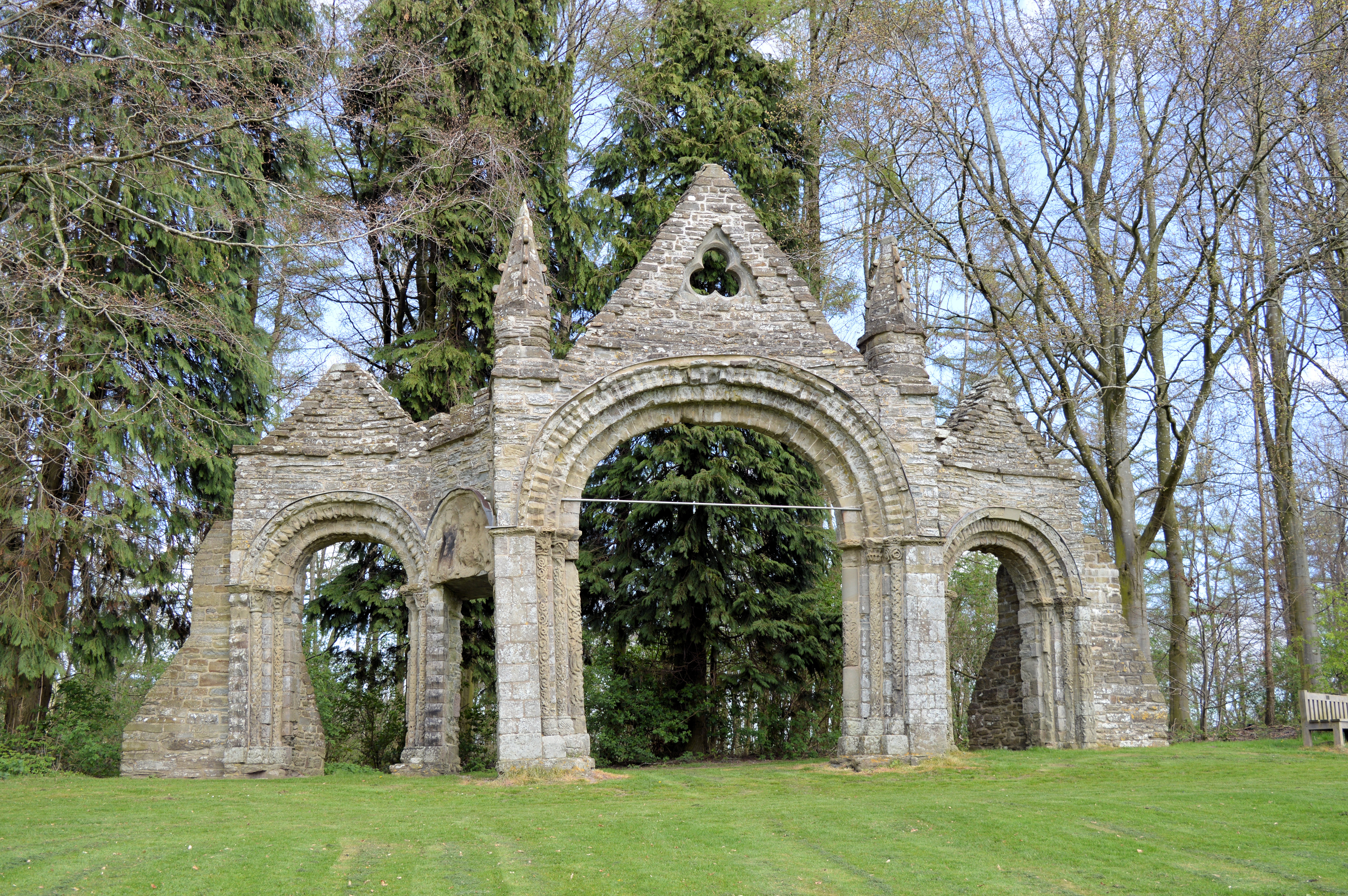
The Shobdon Arches eyecatcher incorporates material from the church

== Sources ==
- Brooks, Alan; Pevsner, Nikolaus (2012). Herefordshire. The Buildings of England. Yale University Press. ISBN 978-0-300-12575-7.
- Jenkins, Simon (1999). England's Thousand Best Churches. Penguin. ISBN 0-713-99281-6.
