= Thomas Hill (Leominster MP) =

Thomas Hill (baptised 28 September 1721 – 23 August 1776) was a British politician who sat in the House of Commons from 1774 to 1776.

Hill was the only son of Thomas Hill of Court of Hill, Shropshire, and his wife Martha Hammond, daughter of Edward Hammond, and was baptized on 28 September 1721. His father died on 14 October 1724 when he was three. In 1755, he was admitted to study law at the Middle Temple. He married Lucy Roche, daughter of Francis Roche of Whitton on 29 December 1757, by whom he had two daughters.

Hill was returned unopposed as Member of Parliament for Leominster at the 1774 general election, although how this came about is unknown. He does not appear to have voted or spoken in Parliament before his death.

Hill died at the age of 54 on 23 August 1776.

Parliament of Great Britain
| Preceded by John Carnac; The Viscount Bateman | Member of Parliament for Leominster; 1774–1776; With: The Viscount Bateman | Succeeded by Frederick Cornewall; The Viscount Bateman |
