= Edward Harley (1664–1735) =

British Tory politician (1664–1735)

Member of Parliament for Droitwich
- In office 1695–1698 Serving with Charles Cocks
- Preceded by: The Lord Coote; Philip Foley
- Succeeded by: Charles Cocks; Thomas Foley

Member of Parliament for Leominster
- In office 1698–1701 Serving with The Lord Coningsby
- Preceded by: The Lord Coningsby; John Dutton Colt
- Succeeded by: The Lord Coningsby; John Dutton Colt

Member of Parliament for Leominster
- In office 1701–1707 Serving with The Lord Coningsby
- Preceded by: The Lord Coningsby; John Dutton Colt
- Succeeded by: Parliament of Great Britain

Member of Parliament for Leominster
- In office 1707–1722 Serving with The Lord Coningsby (1707–1710); Edward Bangham (1710–1713); Henry Gorges (1713–1715); The Lord Coningsby (1715–1717); George Caswall (1717–1721); William Bateman (1721–1722)
- Preceded by: Parliament of England
- Succeeded by: Sir Archer Croft, Bt; Sir George Caswall

Auditor of the imprests
- In office 1703–1735 Serving with The Lord Coningsby
- Preceded by: Brook Bridges; Thomas Done
- Succeeded by: William Benson; Thomas Foley

Personal details
- Born: 7 June 1664; Herefordshire, England
- Died: 30 August 1735 (aged 71); Herefordshire, England
- Political party: Tory
- Spouse: Sarah Foley
- Parent: Edward Harley (father)
- Relatives: Edward Harley (son); Robert Harley (brother); Edward Harley (brother); Robert Harley (son); Thomas Foley (father-in-law)
- Education: Westminster School

Edward Harley (7 June 1664 – 30 August 1735) was a British Tory politician. He sat as Member of Parliament for twenty seven years supporting the group led by his brother, Robert Harley. He was also Auditor of the Imprests. Because of this, and to distinguish him from other family members of the same name, is frequently known as Auditor Harley.

== Career ==
He was second son of Edward Harley of Brampton Bryan, Herefordshire and the younger brother of Robert Harley, 1st Earl of Oxford and Earl Mortimer. He was educated at Westminster School and the Middle Temple (1681), where he was called to the bar in 1688.

He represented Droitwich in Parliament from 1695 to 1698, after which he was a member for Leominster, almost continuously until 1722. He was appointed Recorder of Leominster for 1692-1732 and joint Auditor of the Imprests for life in 1702. He was a solid supporter of his brother's government from 1710 to 1714. He strongly opposed the 1715 measure in the Commons to have Harley impeached, but this was unsuccessful and his brother was imprisoned in the Tower of London for two years.

He purchased the Eywood estate at Titley, Herefordshire and there around 1705 built a new house, which was demolished in 1958.

== Family ==
He married Sarah Foley, third daughter of Thomas Foley. Their eldest son (Edward) succeeded as 3rd Earl of Oxford on the death of his brother Robert's son Edward, the 2nd earl, without male issue. Their second son Robert died in infancy, after which came a daughter named Abigail and finally another son Robert Harley, Recorder of Leominster and twice Member of Parliament for that town.

== Sources ==
- thepeerage.com
- Leigh Rayment's Peerage Pages
- Burke's Peerage (1851 edition).
- Sarah Harley funerary monument, Brampton Bryan church, Herefordshire.

== Bibliography ==
- Rogers, Pat. The Life and Times of Thomas, Lord Coningsby: The Whig Hangman and his Victims. A&C Black, 2011.

Political offices
Preceded by Brook Bridges; Thomas Done	Auditor of the imprests 1703–1735; With: Brook Bridges (1703–1705); Arthur Mainwaring (1705–1712); Thomas Foley (1713–1735)	Succeeded by William Benson; Thomas Foley
Parliament of England
Preceded by The Lord Coote; Philip Foley	Member of Parliament for Droitwich; 1695–1698; With: Charles Cocks	Succeeded by Charles Cocks; Thomas Foley
Preceded by The Lord Coningsby; John Dutton Colt	Member of Parliament for Leominster; 1698–1701; With: The Lord Coningsby	Succeeded by The Lord Coningsby; John Dutton Colt
Preceded by The Lord Coningsby; John Dutton Colt	Member of Parliament for Leominster; 1701–1707; With: The Lord Coningsby	Succeeded by Parliament of Great Britain
Parliament of Great Britain
Preceded by Parliament of England	Member of Parliament for Leominster; 1707–1722; With: The Lord Coningsby 1707–1710; Edward Bangham 1710–1713; Henry Gorges 1713–1715; The Lord Coningsby 1715–1717; George Caswall 1717–1721; William Bateman 1721–1722	Succeeded by Sir Archer Croft, Bt; Sir George Caswall
