= Shobdon Airfield =

Airport in Herefordshire, England

- IATA: QKS; ICAO: EGBS

Summary
- Airport type: Private
- Operator: Herefordshire Aero Club Ltd
- Location: Shobdon
- Elevation AMSL: 317 ft (97 m)
- Coordinates: 52°14′30″N 002°52′52″W
- Website: https://www.shobdonairfield.co.uk/

Map
- Location in Herefordshire

Runways
Direction	Length		Surface
Direction	m	ft	Surface
08/26	836	2,743	Tarmac
08/26; Unlicensed	940	3,084	Grass
08/26; Unlicensed	308	1,010	Grass
- Sources: UK AIP at NATS

Shobdon Airfield (IATA: QKS, ICAO: EGBS) is an airport 6 NM (11 km; 6.9 mi) south of Shobdon village, and west of Leominster, Herefordshire, England.

== RAF Shobdon ==
Shobdon started as a British Army camp. It acted as a reception point for casualties received from Southampton being distributed to local hospitals. With a depot railway station developed on the Leominster and Kington Railway, its first casualties arrived after the Battle of Dunkirk.

The camp was developed further by the United States Army from 1943, to act as a distribution point for two locally developed general hospitals. They also added a runway in co-operation with the Royal Air Force, but due to the marshy land only one runway was developed.

In 1943, RAF No. 1 Glider Training School moved from RAF Thame to Shobdon, enabling an increase in training of glider pilots in preparation for Normandy and Arnhem landings.

The RAF Gliding School closed in 1953, when the site was handed to Herefordshire County Council.

== Today ==
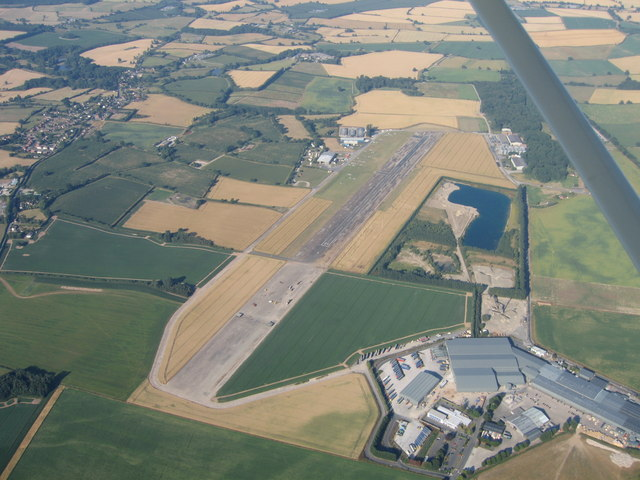
Shobdon Airfield

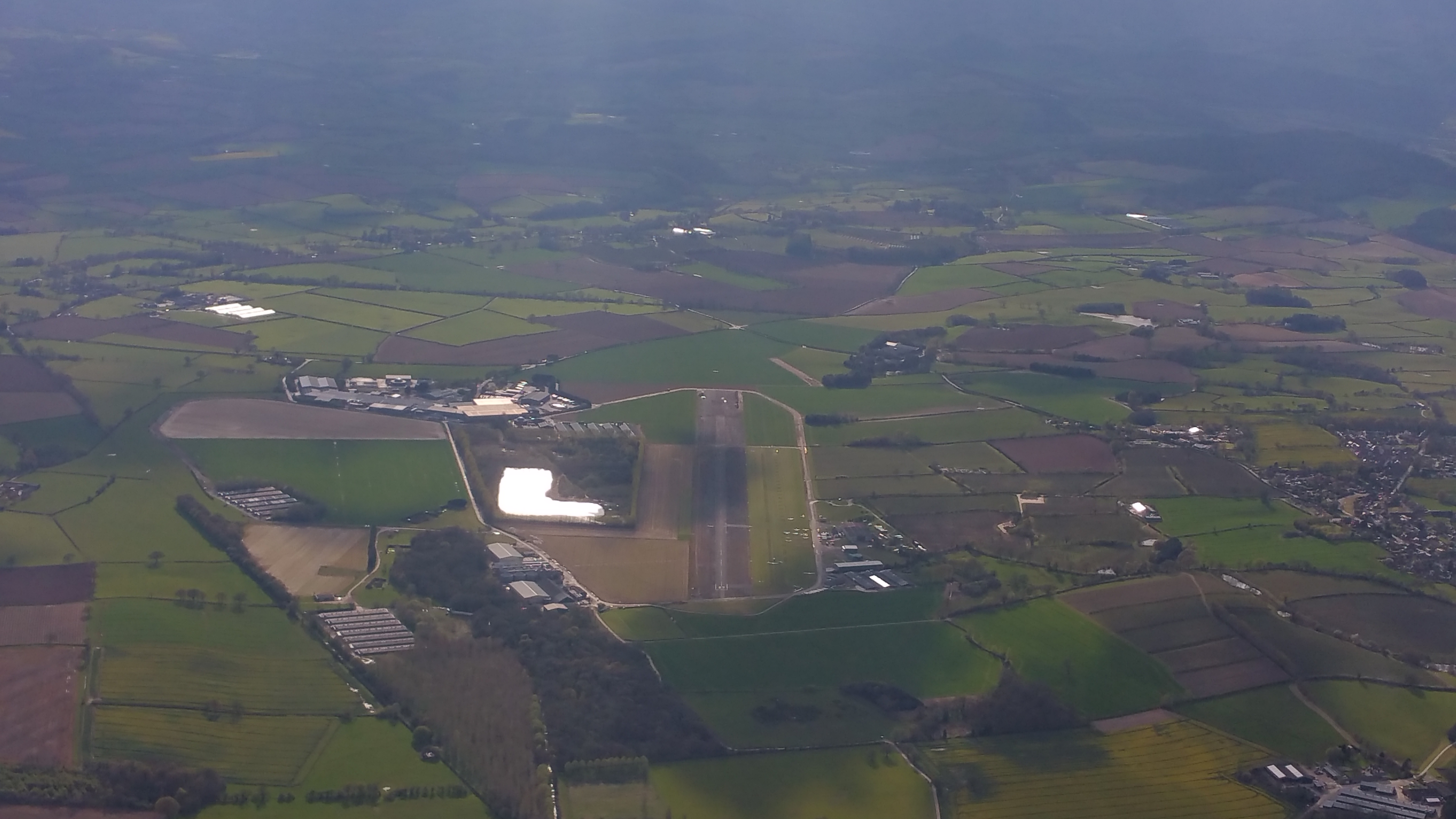
Shobdon Airfield from the East. Taken from a glider.

Shobdon Airfield has a Civil Aviation Authority (CAA) Ordinary Licence (Number P779) that allows flights for the public transport of passengers or for flying instruction as authorised by the licensee (Herefordshire Aero Club Limited).

It is operated by Herefordshire Aero Club who provide light aircraft flight training together with aircraft storage.

Other air sports facilities based at Shobdon Airfield are:

- Shobdon LAA Strut a kit-build group hold monthly social evenings
- Tiger Helicopters offer helicopter flight training and maintenance.
- Swift Light Flight microlight club and training school.
- Herefordshire Gliding Club and training school.

From 1963 to 1990 Herefordshire Parachute Club was very active but now parachuting is no longer available at the airfield.
