= William Bateman, 1st Viscount Bateman =

British politician (1695-1744)

The Right Honourable The Viscount Bateman
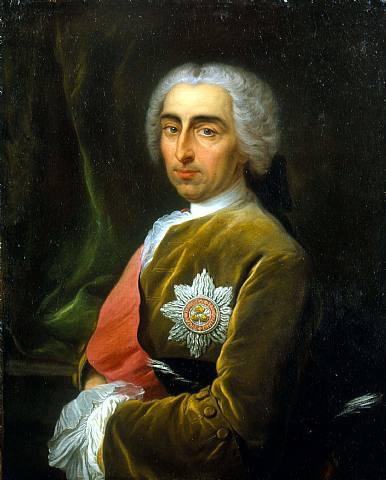
- Possible portrait by Charles-André van Loo

Viscount Bateman Baron Culmore
- Reign: 12 July 1725 – December 1744 (19 years)
- Predecessor: The first viscount
- Successor: John Bateman
- Born: William Bateman; 1695
- Died: December 1744 (1744 (aged 48–49)
- Noble family: Bateman
- Spouse: Lady Anne Spencer (m. 1700)
- Issue: John Bateman, 2nd Viscount Bateman; Captain Hon. William Bateman
- Father: James Bateman of Shobdon Court
- Mother: Esther Searle

William Bateman, 1st Viscount Bateman KB, FRS (1695 – December 1744) was a British Whig politician who represented Leominster in the House of Commons of Great Britain from 1721 to 1734..

== Biography ==
Bateman was the son of Sir James Bateman, of Shobdon Court, Shobdon, Lord Mayor of London and Governor of the Bank of England, by his wife Esther Searle, daughter of John Searle, of Finchley, Middlesex.

Bateman was returned as Member of Parliament for Leominster at a by-election in 1721 but did not stand at the 1722 general election. In 1725 he was raised to the Peerage of Ireland as Baron of Culmore, in the County of Londonderry, and Viscount Bateman. At the 1727 general election he was again elected to represent Leominster. In 1734 he was a candidate at Radnor, but was defeated and never stood for Parliament again. He was made a Knight Companion of the Order of the Bath in 1732 and elected a Fellow of the Royal Society in 1733.

Lord Bateman married Lady Anne Spencer, daughter of Charles Spencer, 3rd Earl of Sunderland and Lady Anne Churchill, daughter of John Churchill, 1st Duke of Marlborough, in 1720. He died in Paris in December 1744 and was succeeded in the viscountcy by his son, John. Lady Bateman died in February 1769.

Parliament of Great Britain
Preceded by Edward Harley; George Caswall	Member of Parliament for Leominster; 1721–1722; With: Edward Harley	Succeeded by Sir Archer Croft, Bt; Sir George Caswall
Preceded by Sir George Caswall; Sir Archer Croft, Bt	Member of Parliament for Leominster; 1727–1734; With: Sir George Caswall	Succeeded by Sir George Caswall; Robert Harley
Peerage of Ireland
New creation	Viscount Bateman; 1725–1744	Succeeded by John Bateman
