= William Bateman-Hanbury, 2nd Baron Bateman =

British politician and peer (1826–1901)

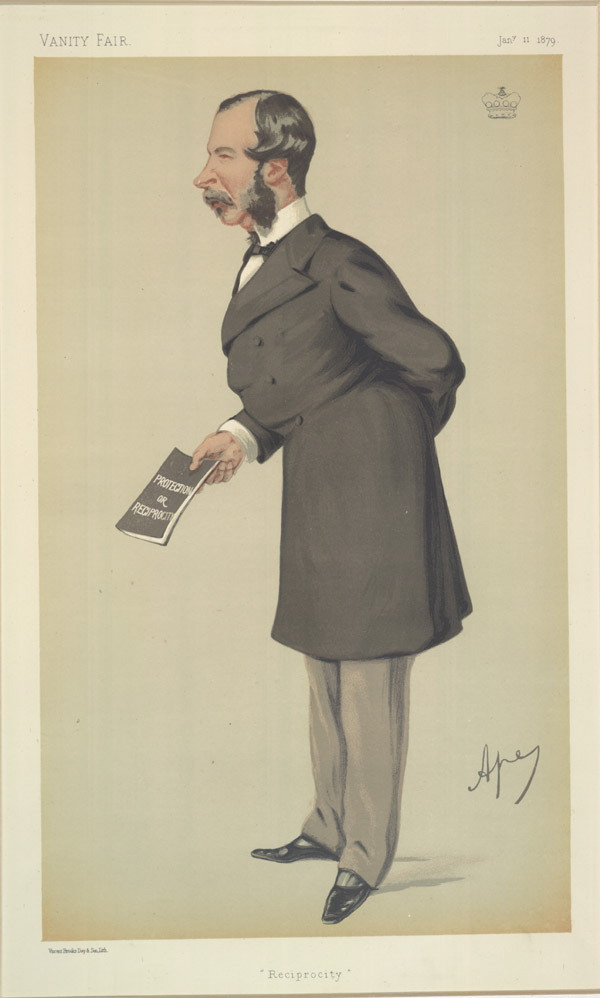
"Reciprocity" Lord Bateman as caricatured by Ape (Carlo Pellegrini) in Vanity Fair, January 1879

William Bateman Bateman-Hanbury, 2nd Baron Bateman (28 July 1826 – 30 November 1901), styled The Honourable from 1837 until 1845, was a British peer and Conservative politician.

== Background and education ==
Born William Hanbury at Kelmarsh, he was the son of William Bateman-Hanbury, 1st Baron Bateman and his wife Elizabeth, daughter of Lord Spencer Chichester, son of Arthur Chichester, 1st Marquess of Donegall. He was educated at Eton College and then Trinity College, Cambridge, of which he was MA. In 1837 he assumed by Royal licence the additional surname of Bateman.

== Career ==
He succeeded his father in the barony in 1845 and took his seat on the Conservative benches in the House of Lords. Bateman-Hanbury joined the Leicestershire Yeomanry Cavalry as a cornet in 1847. Between 1858 and 1859 he served as a Lord-in-waiting (government whip in the House of Lords) in the Conservative administration of the Earl of Derby. In 1852, having been previously a Deputy Lieutenant, he was appointed Lord Lieutenant of Herefordshire, a post he held for almost fifty years until his death in 1901. He was also Honorary Colonel of the Herefordshire Militia (later the 4th (Hereford Militia) Battalion, King's Shropshire Light Infantry) from 19 May 1864 until his death.

== Family ==
Lord Bateman married Agnes Kerrison, youngest daughter of General Sir Edward Kerrison, 1st Baronet, on 13 May 1854. They had four sons and six daughters. He died 30 November 1901, aged 75, and was succeeded in the barony by his son William. Lady Bateman died in 1918.

== Publications ==
- Lord Bateman's plea for limited protection or for reciprocity in free trade with a preface by the author. A letter printed by The Times of 12 November 1877. 1878, London: William Ridgway, & Philadelphia: Henry Carey Baird & Co.

== Arms ==
Coat of arms of William Bateman-Hanbury, 2nd Baron Bateman
Crest 1st out of a mural crown Sable a demi-lion Or holding in the dexter paw a battleaxe Sable helved Gold (Hanbury). 2nd a duck's head and neck between two wings Proper (Bateman). Escutcheon Quarterly 1st & 4th Or on a bend engrailed Vert plain cottised Sable in chief a crescent on a crescent for difference (Hanbury) 2nd & 3rd Or on a fess Sable between three Muscovy ducks Proper a rose of the field (Bateman). Supporters Two lions Argent gorged with plain collars each charged with a rose between two fleurs-de-lis Or and chains of the latter affixed to each collar and reflexed over the back. Motto Nec Prece Nec Pretio

Honorary titles
Preceded by The Earl Somers	Lord Lieutenant of Herefordshire; 1852–1901	Succeeded by John Hungerford Arkwright
Peerage of the United Kingdom
Preceded by William Bateman-Hanbury	Baron Bateman; 1845–1901	Succeeded by William Bateman-Hanbury
