= Eyecatcher (landscape) =

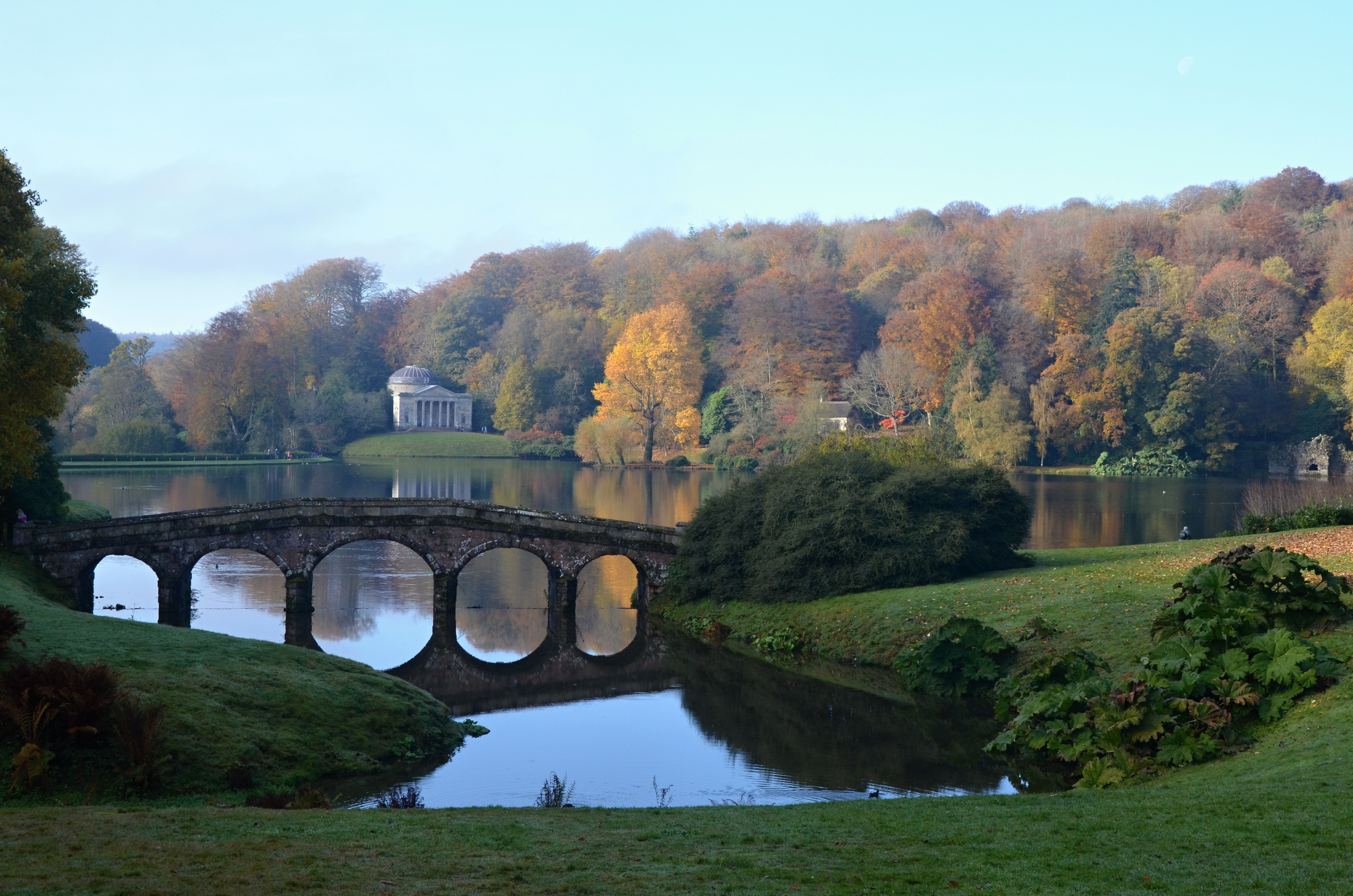
Palladian bridge and Pantheon eyecathers at Stourhead estate

Gloriette in the Schönbrunn Palace garden

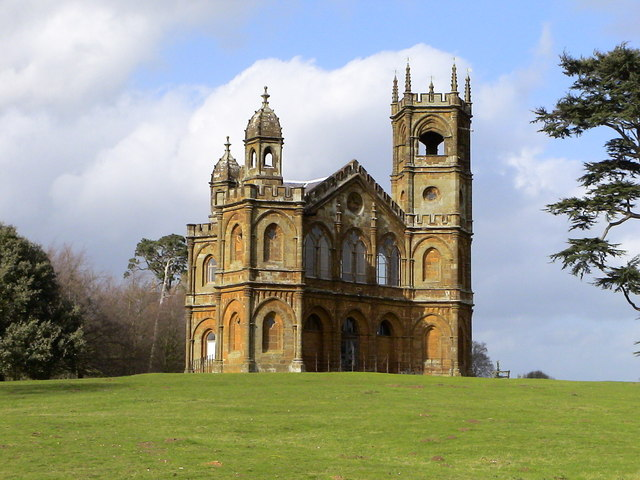
The Gothic temple, a folly at Stowe House gardens

An eyecatcher is something artificial that has been placed in the landscape as a focal point to "catch the eye" or gain a viewer's attention. It is used to decorate or ornament landscapes for aesthetic reasons, and are typically found in gardens, parks and the grounds of stately homes. Many of these can be found in various forms.

== Devices or objects ==
These can be anything but typically they tend to be

- boulders
- rockery
- trees

Or on a grander scale they can be structures such as a

- bridge over a river, a stream or lake as an ornamental feature
- conservatory - glasshouses, orangeries, vineries
- exedra
- folly
- gloriettes
- grottoes
  - shell grottos
- mausoleums
- monopteros
- monuments (whether they commemorate anything or just for decoration)
- nymphaea
- pavilions
- reflecting pools
- shooting/hunting lodge
- summer houses
- temples (ornamental or not, as they may sometimes have more than aesthetic use)

== See also ==
- List of garden features
