= William Bateman-Hanbury, 1st Baron Bateman =

British politician and peer (1780–1845)

William Bateman-Hanbury, 1st Baron Bateman (24 June 1780 – 22 July 1845) was a Member of Parliament and later a Baron in the Peerage of the United Kingdom.

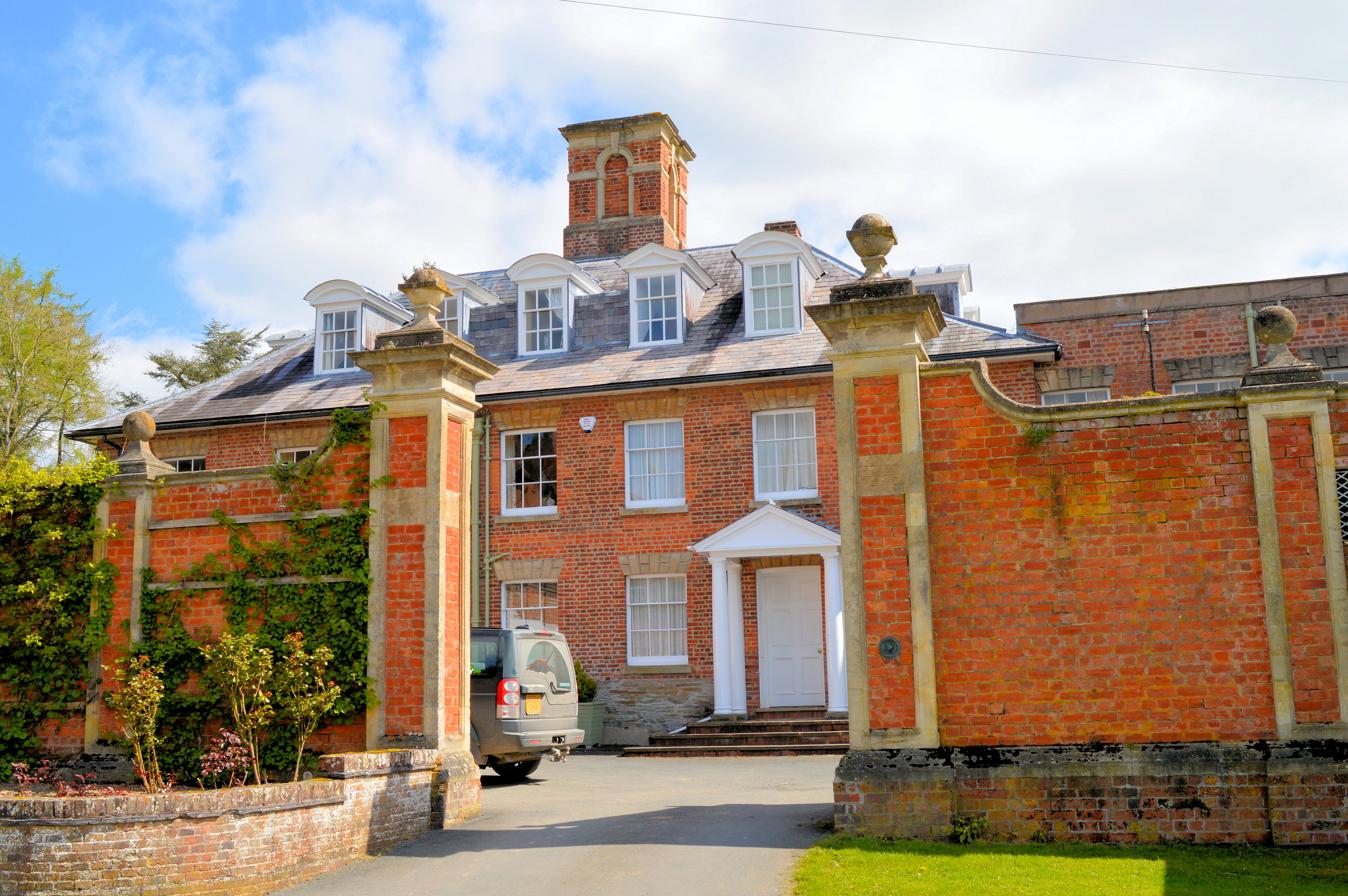
Shobdon Court service block

At birth his name was William Hanbury, although he was a distant descendant of Sir James Bateman who had been Lord Mayor of London and was his 2nd great-grandfather. Hanbury studied at Eton College and then Christ Church, Oxford graduating from the later in 1798. In 1802 he inherited Shobdon Court, near Leominster, Herefordshire from John Bateman, 2nd Viscount Bateman.

He served as a Whig MP from Northampton from 1810 to 1818. From 1819 to 1820 he was High Sheriff of Herefordshire. In 1835 Hanbury made an unsuccessful run for Parliament as a liberal.

In January 1837 Hanbury became the first Baron Bateman of Shobdon. In February he had his name legally changed to William Bateman-Hanbury. In 1822 he had married Elizabeth Chichester, the granddaughter of Arthur Chichester, 1st Marquess of Donegall. They had four sons and four daughters. He was succeeded by his eldest son William Bateman-Hanbury, 2nd Baron Bateman.

== Arms ==
Coat of arms of William Bateman-Hanbury, 1st Baron Bateman
Crest 1st out of a mural crown Sable a demi-lion Or holding in the dexter paw a battleaxe Sable helved Gold (Hanbury). 2nd a duck's head and neck between two wings Proper (Bateman). Escutcheon Quarterly 1st & 4th Or on a bend engrailed Vert plain cottised Sable in chief a crescent on a crescent for difference (Hanbury) 2nd & 3rd Or on a fess Sable between three Muscovy ducks Proper a rose of the field (Bateman). Supporters Two lions Argent gorged with plain collars each charged with a rose between two fleurs-de-lis Or and chains of the latter affixed to each collar and reflexed over the back. Motto Nec Prece Nec Pretio

Parliament of the United Kingdom
Preceded by Edward Bouverie; Spencer Perceval	Member of Parliament for Northampton; 1810–1818; With: Spencer Perceval to 1812; Earl Compton from 1812	Succeeded by Sir Edward Kerrison, Bt; Earl Compton
Peerage of the United Kingdom
New creation	Baron Bateman; 1837–1845	Succeeded by William Bateman-Hanbury
