= Shobdon =

Village in Herefordshire, England

Coordinates: 52.25°N 2.88°W

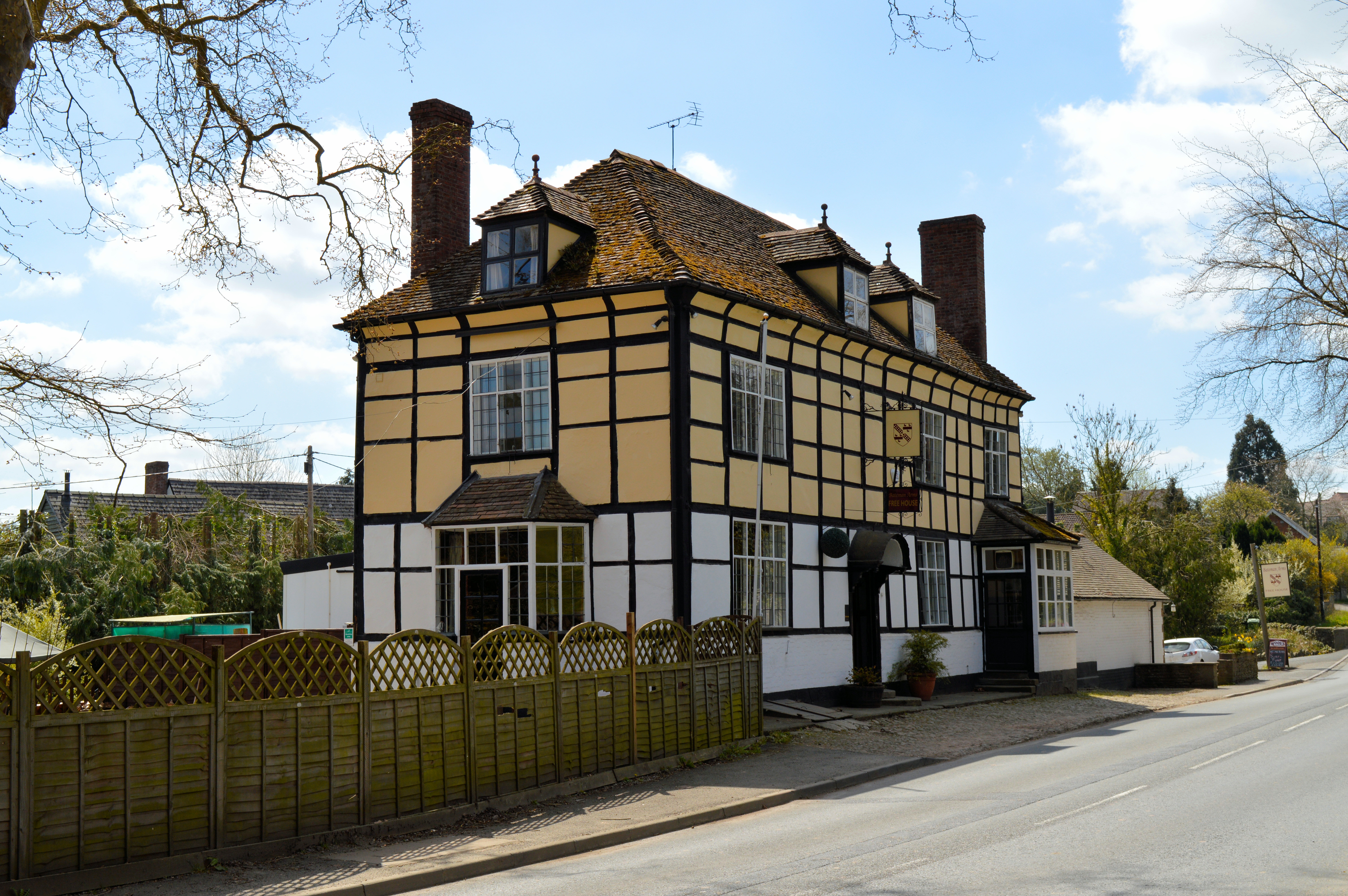
- The Bateman Arms public house

- Location within Herefordshire
- Population: 816
- Unitary authority: Herefordshire
- Ceremonial county: Herefordshire
- Region: West Midlands
- Country: England
- Sovereign state: United Kingdom
- Post town: LEOMINSTER
- Postcode district: HR6
- Dialling code: 01568
- Police: West Mercia
- Fire: Hereford and Worcester
- Ambulance: West Midlands
- UK Parliament: North Herefordshire

Shobdon is a village and civil parish in Herefordshire, England, about 15 miles north of Hereford, six miles west of Leominster, and 2 miles southwest of the Mortimer's Cross. According to the 2001 census, the parish population was 769, consisting of 386 males and 383 females. The population had increased to 816 by the time of the 2011 census.

The parish includes the hamlets of Hanbury Green, Uphampton, Easthampton and Ledicot.

== History ==
In the 17th century the manor of Shobdon was owned by the Bateman family, who lived at Shobdon Court, constructed c1710 and remodelled in 1861. The Bateman Arms pub is named after them.

Shobdon church is St John the Evangelist, north of the village. It has a direct connection to Horace Walpole's Strawberry Hill in Twickenham and the members of the "Committee of Taste" which strongly influenced its design. Its intact interior and matching furniture are the sole example of this Walpolean Gothick style of Georgian church architecture and furnishing. On 4 November 2013 was culminated 12 years and £1.25 million of repairs to restore this "Strawberry Hill Gothic" Church. Shobdon Church is an important work of architecture.

Nearby is the Shobdon Arches folly, which are the original interior arches of the church that were removed in 1756, being placed at the top of the adjacent hill as a folly where they still stand. The Shobdon Arches consist of a central chancel arch and two Norman doorways. The weathered carvings are the work of the Herefordshire School of sculpture, which dominated in the western counties during the mid-12th Century. Tympana were once probably part of the original doorways.

== Amenities ==
The village has a primary school with approximately 82 children attending. When the children leave Shobdon Primary they mostly progress to Wigmore High School, although some go to either Weobley High School or Lady Hawkins' School. Co-located with the Primary School is Shobdon Village Hall which consists of a community room and kitchen, and shared access to the school hall. Occasional fundraising activities are undertaken by the village hall committee. The biggest user of the village hall is Shobdon Arches Preschool.

At the western end of the village is Pearl Lake caravan park, which has a number of permanent caravans as well as access for tourers. This is adjacent to Pearl Lake, the largest natural body of water in Herefordshire.

To the south is Shobdon Aerodrome, formerly a Second World War RAF glider training facility, now used for commercial and recreational helicopter flying, fixed wing power flying and glider flying. Shobdon Aerodrome was constructed in 1942 and used as a glider training base. Pilots who trained here took part in both the Normandy landings and Operation Market Garden at Arnhem in the Netherlands.

== Shobdon Festival ==
Every third year Shobdon church hosted a flower festival. This was expanded into an annual food, drink, flower and flying festival which is held on the last weekend in June. The eleventh anniversary Festival was held at Shobdon Airfield on the weekend of 27–28 June 2015.

== Climate ==
The temperature is usually between −0.3 °C (31.5 °F) and 23.2 °C (73.8 °F).

Climate data for Shobdon Airfield (1991–2020)
Month	Jan	Feb	Mar	Apr	May	Jun	Jul	Aug	Sep	Oct	Nov	Dec	Year
Record high °C (°F)	14.9 (58.8)	17.2 (63.0)	22.3 (72.1)	24.6 (76.3)	31.2 (88.2)	30.8 (87.4)	35.0 (95.0)	33.1 (91.6)	29.5 (85.1)	27.2 (81.0)	18.0 (64.4)	15.2 (59.4)	35.0 (95.0)
Mean daily maximum °C (°F)	7.6 (45.7)	8.2 (46.8)	10.6 (51.1)	13.5 (56.3)	16.7 (62.1)	19.6 (67.3)	21.7 (71.1)	21.3 (70.3)	18.6 (65.5)	14.4 (57.9)	10.5 (50.9)	7.9 (46.2)	14.2 (57.6)
Daily mean °C (°F)	4.5 (40.1)	4.8 (40.6)	6.6 (43.9)	8.8 (47.8)	11.7 (53.1)	14.5 (58.1)	16.4 (61.5)	16.1 (61.0)	13.8 (56.8)	10.5 (50.9)	7.0 (44.6)	4.6 (40.3)	10.0 (50.0)
Mean daily minimum °C (°F)	1.3 (34.3)	1.4 (34.5)	2.5 (36.5)	4.1 (39.4)	6.7 (44.1)	9.4 (48.9)	11.1 (52.0)	11.0 (51.8)	8.9 (48.0)	6.6 (43.9)	3.5 (38.3)	1.4 (34.5)	5.7 (42.3)
Record low °C (°F)	−12.2 (10.0)	−9.5 (14.9)	−7.8 (18.0)	−4.9 (23.2)	−2.3 (27.9)	0.2 (32.4)	2.6 (36.7)	2.4 (36.3)	−0.7 (30.7)	−5.6 (21.9)	−9.5 (14.9)	−16.9 (1.6)	−16.9 (1.6)
Average precipitation mm (inches)	77.2 (3.04)	60.1 (2.37)	55.5 (2.19)	58.6 (2.31)	56.4 (2.22)	58.3 (2.30)	55.5 (2.19)	64.2 (2.53)	58.8 (2.31)	84.5 (3.33)	81.9 (3.22)	86.4 (3.40)	797.3 (31.39)
Average precipitation days (≥ 1.0 mm)	13.9	11.0	10.5	10.1	10.0	9.3	9.2	10.2	9.3	12.2	13.4	13.7	132.9
Mean monthly sunshine hours	55.0	83.9	118.8	165.7	213.5	195.1	214.9	168.1	149.1	103.4	68.6	56.3	1,592.4
Source 1: Met Office
Source 2: Starlings Roost Weather
