= Wylie (surname) =

Wylie is a surname. Notable people with the surname include:

== A ==
- Adam Wylie (born 1984), American actor, singer and performer
- Alexander Wylie (missionary) (1815–1887), British Christian missionary in China.
- Alexander Wylie, Lord Kinclaven, Scottish judge
- Alexander Wylie (politician) (1838–1921), British MP for Dunbartonshire, 1895–1906
- Alex Wylie (footballer) (1872–1902), Scottish footballer for St Mirren
- Alex Wylie (cricketer) (born 1973), English cricketer
- Alison Wylie (born 1954), Canadian feminist philosopher of science
- Andrew Wylie (American football) (born 1994), American football player
- Andrew Wylie (college president), (1789–1851), American academic and theologian
- Andrew Wylie (footballer), British football manager
- Andrew Wylie (literary agent) (born 1947), American literary agent
- Andrew Wylie (judge) (1814–1905), US federal judge
- Andrew Wylie (cricketer) (born 1971), South African cricketer
- Andrew Wylie (skier) (born 1961), British Olympic skier
- Ann Wylie (1922–2024), New Zealand botanist
- Austin Wylie (1893–1954), American jazz bandleader

== B ==
- Barbara Wylie (1861–1954), British suffragette
- Ben Wylie, Irish cricketer
- Betty Jane Wylie (born 1931), Canadian writer and playwright
- Bill Wylie (1928–1983), Canadian ice hockey player
- Bill Wylie (footballer) (1891–1974), Australian rules footballer
- Bill Wylie-Kellermann, American Methodist pastor, activist and author
- Bob Wylie (born 1954), American football coach in Canada

== C ==
- Cathy Wylie, New Zealand academic
- Chalmers Wylie (1920–1998), American politician and lawyer
- Charles Wylie (British Army officer) (1919–2007), British army officer and mountaineer
- Charles Doughty-Wylie (1868–1915), British Army officer
- Charles Wylie (astronomer) (1886–1976)
- Christopher Wylie (born 1989), British-Canadian data consultant
- Cody Wylie, American businessman and politician

== D ==
- David Wylie (author) (born 1929), American writer, attorney and local politician
- David Wylie (footballer) (born 1966), former Scottish football goalkeeper
- David James Wylie (1859–1932), English-born civil engineer, farmer, rancher and political figure in Saskatchewan
- David Stewart Wylie (1771–1856), Scottish Baptist minister
- Devon Wylie (1988–2023), American football player
- Dirk Wylie (1920–1948), American science-fiction author and literary agent
- Donovan Wylie (born 1971), photographer from Northern Ireland
- Drew Wylie, Irish Gaelic footballer
- Duane Wylie (born 1950), Canadian ice hockey player

== E ==
- Elinor Wylie (1885–1928), American poet and novelist

== F ==
- Fannie Wylie (1894–1971), American politician from Nebraska
- Sir Francis Wylie (1865–1952), British academic literary critic
- Sir Francis Verner Wylie (1891–1970), British civil servant in India

== G ==
- George Wylie (politician) (1848–1926), Scottish-American farmer and politician
- George Wyllie (British Army soldier) (1908–1987), Royal Engineer awarded the George Cross
- Gill Wylie (born 1964/5), Northern Irish football coach
- Gordon Wylie, Scottish amateur footballer
- Graham Wylie (born 1959), British businessman, a founder of the Sage Group

== H ==
- Harry Wylie (1878–1951), Canadian competitive sailor
- Harvey Wylie (1933–2019), former defensive back who played nine seasons in the Canadian Football League for the Calgary Stampeders
- Henry Wylie (1844–1918), British army officer, administrator and diplomat

== I ==
- Ian Martin Wylie (born 1955), British medical administrator
- I. A. R. Wylie (1885–1959), Australian/British/American writer

== J ==
- Jackie Wylie, Scottish cultural event organizer
- Sir James Wylie, 1st Baronet (1768–1854), Scottish physician
- James Aitken Wylie (1808–1890), Scottish historian
- James Hamilton Wylie (1844–1914), British historian
- James Owens Wylie (1845–1935), Irish lawyer and judge
- Jim Wylie (1887–1956), New Zealand rugby union player
- J. B. Wylie (1855–1932), American politician from Arizona
- J.C. Wylie (1911–1993), American strategic theorist
- Jennifer Wylie (born 1984), Canadian curler
- Jenny Wylie (born 1957), American swimmer
- Joe Wylie (born 1968), American basketball player
- John Wylie (actor) (1925–2004), American actor
- John Wylie (footballer, born 1854) (1854–1924), English amateur footballer
- John Wylie (footballer, born 1936) (1936–2013), British footballer
- John Wylie (businessman) (born 1961), Australian investment banker
- John Wylie (surgeon) (1790–1852), Scottish military surgeon
- Jordan Wylie (born 1983), British adventurer
- Julian Wylie (1878–1934), British theatrical agent and producer

== K ==
- Keith Wylie (1945–1999), English croquet player
- Keith Wylie (rugby league), Australian rugby league footballer
- Kevin Wylie (born 1968), American soccer player
- Kevin Wylie (Australian footballer) (1933–2023), Australian rules footballer

== L ==
- Laura Johnson Wylie (1855–1932), American college professor and suffragist
- Lauri Wylie (1880–1951), British author
- Lesley Wylie (1887–1959), Australian rugby league footballer
- Lollie Belle Wylie (1858–1923), American poet and composer

== M ==
- Margaret Wylie (born 1870), Western Australian author and educator
- Matthew Wylie (born 1996), British swimmer
- Mike Wylie, Australian rugby league footballer
- Mina Wylie (1891–1984), Australian swimmer

== N ==
- Norman Wylie, Lord Wylie (1923–2005), Scottish politician

== P ==
- Paul Wylie (born 1964), American figure skater
- Pete Wylie (born 1958), English singer-songwriter and guitarist
- Philip Wylie (1902–1971), American writer
- Phyllis Wylie (1911–2012), English amateur golfer

== R ==
- Ren Wylie (1861–1951), American baseball player
- Richard "Popcorn" Wylie (1939–2008), American R&B pianist, songwriter and record producer
- Robert Wylie (artist) (1839–1877), American artist
- Robert Wylie (cricketer) (1948–2015), New Zealand cricketer
- Rod Wylie, Queensland corporate figure
- Ron Wylie (1933–2020), Scottish football player, coach and manager
- Rose Wylie (born 1934), British painter
- Ross Wylie (born 1991), Scottish racing driver
- Ruth Shaw Wylie (1916–1989), U.S.-born composer and music educator
- Ryan Wylie (born 1994), Irish Gaelic footballer

== S ==
- Samuel Brown Wylie (1773–1852), Irish oriental and classical scholar
- Samuel J. Wylie (1918–1974), American Episcopalian bishop
- Sandy Wylie, Lord Kinclaven (born 1951), Scottish judge
- Sarah Wylie (born 1989), Canadian writer of young adult novels
- Sharon Wylie (born 1949), American politician of the Democratic Party
- Shaun Wylie (1913–2009), British mathematician
- Simon Beresford-Wylie (born 1958), British technology executive
- Sofia Wylie (born 2004), American actress and dancer
- Steve Wylie (1911–1993), American baseball pitcher

== T ==
- Theophilus Adam Wylie (1810–1895), American Presbyterian minister and academic
- Thomas Wylie (1841–1915), Canadian physician and political figure
- Tom Wylie (footballer, born 1896) (1896–?), Scottish footballer (Blackburn Rovers)
- Tom Wylie (footballer, born 1907) (1907–?), Scottish footballer (Sunderland)
- Trish Wylie, Irish author of romance novels
- Turrell V. Wylie (1927–1984), American Tibetologist and sinologist

== W ==
- Wendell L. Wylie (1913–1966), American orthodontist
- Willard Otis Wylie (1862–1944), American philatelic editor and writer
- William Campbell Wylie (1905–1992), New Zealand-born colonial judge
- William Duncan Wylie (1900–1981), Canadian farmer, public servant and politician
- William Howie Wylie (1833–1891), Scottish journalist and Baptist minister
- W. Derek Wylie (1918–1998) was a British academic
- William M. Wylie (1928–2006), American politician, farmer, and businessman
- Wylie (Australian explorer) (born c. 1825), Indigenous Australian

== See also ==
- Wyllie
- Wiley (disambiguation)
- Wylie (disambiguation)
- Wyly
- Wyle (disambiguation)
