= Wylie =

Wylie is an English name meaning "well-watered meadow", and may also refer to:

== People ==
- Christopher Wylie (born 1989), British-Canadian data consultant and whistleblower
- Wylie (surname)
- Wylie (Australian explorer), Aboriginal companion of Edward John Eyre during his crossing of the Nullarbor Plain in Australia
- Wylie Breckenridge (1903–1991), rugby union player who represented Australia
- Wylie Gelber (born 1988), American bassist and guitar maker, founding member of the band Dawes
- Wylie Gibbs (1922–2026), Australian politician
- Wylie Cameron Grant (1879–1968), American tennis champion
- Wylie Human (born 1979), South African rugby union winger
- Wylie Stateman, American supervising sound editor
- Wylie Sypher (1905–1987), American non-fiction writer and professor
- Wylie Watson (1889–1966), British actor
- Wylie G. Woodruff (1866–1930), American football player and coach

== Fictional characters ==
- Wile E. Coyote, a cartoon character whose name sounds similar to "Wily"
- Wylie Burp, a character from the film An American Tail: Fievel Goes West
- Wylie Endal, a character from Keeper Of The Lost Cities by Shannon Messenger

== Places ==
=== United States ===
- Lake Wylie, South Carolina
- Wylie Township, Minnesota
- Wylie, Texas, a city located primarily within Collin County
- Wylie, Taylor County, Texas, an unincorporated community largely in the city limits of Abilene
- Wylie Island, a bar island on the New River in Summers County, West Virginia
- Lake Wylie, a reservoir, or man-made lake in the U.S. states of both South Carolina and North Carolina

=== Elsewhere ===
- Wylie Bay, a bay 4 nautical miles (7 km) wide, lying between Cape Monaco and Norsel Point on the southwest coast of Anvers Island, in the Palmer Archipelago, a group of islands off the northwestern coast of the Antarctic Peninsula
- Wylie Ridge, a ridge that extends westward from Meier Peak in the Admiralty Mountains, Victoria Land, Antarctica
- Wylie, Ontario, a municipality in Eastern Ontario, Canada, on the Ottawa River in Renfrew County

== Other ==
- Wylie transliteration for Tibetan script
- Wylie House Museum a historic house museum of Indiana University's first president Andrew Wylie, in Bloomington, IN
- Wylie Mansion, an American mansion which once stood at 10 Thomas Circle in Washington, D.C
- Wylie School, a historic school building at Ekonk Hill Road and Wylie School Road in Voluntown, Connecticut

== See also ==
- Wiley (disambiguation)
- Whiley
- Wily (disambiguation)
- Wylie (disambiguation)
- Wyllie
- Willey (disambiguation)
- Wylye (disambiguation)
- Wyle (disambiguation)
- Wyly
- Alexander Wylie (disambiguation)
- Andrew Wylie (disambiguation)
- John Wylie (disambiguation)
- Wylie High School (disambiguation)
- David Wylie (disambiguation)
- George Wylie (disambiguation)
