= John Wylie =

John Wylie may refer to:

- John Wylie (actor) (1925–2004), American actor
- John Wylie (businessman) (born 1961), Australian investment banker
- John Wylie (footballer, born 1854) (1854–1924), English amateur footballer
- John Wylie (footballer, born 1914) (1914-?), Scottish footballer, see List of Bury F.C. players (1–24 appearances)
- John Wylie (footballer, born 1936) (1936–2013), English footballer
- John Wylie (musician) (born 1974), hardcore musician from Florida
- John Wyllie (politician) (1835–1870), British member of parliament for Hereford
- John Wylie (surgeon) (1790–1852), Scottish military surgeon
- John Wylie, character on British soap opera Emmerdale

== See also ==
- John Wiley (disambiguation)
- John Wyllie (disambiguation)
- John Wyly (died 1400), member of the Parliament of England for Marlborough
