= 1869 Hereford by-election =

UK parliamentary by-election

The 1869 Hereford by-election was fought on 30 March 1869. The by-election was fought due to the Void election of both the incumbent MPs of the Liberal Party George Clive and John Wyllie. It was won by the Liberal candidates Edward Clive and Chandos Wren-Hoskyns.
