= Whiley =

Whiley is a surname. Notable people with the surname include:

- Manning Whiley (1915–1975), British actor
- Richard Whiley (born 1935), English cricketer
- Jo Whiley (born 1965), English DJ
- Matthew Whiley (born 1980), English cricketer
- Jordanne Whiley (born 1992), British wheelchair tennis player
- Mark Whiley (born 1992), Australian rules footballer

== See also ==
- Whiley (programming language)
- Wiley (disambiguation)
- Wily (disambiguation)
- Wylie (disambiguation)
- Wyllie
- Willey (disambiguation)
- Wylye (disambiguation)
- Wyle (disambiguation)
- Wyly
- Wile E. Coyote, a cartoon character whose name sounds similar to "Wily"
