= Alexander Wylie =

Alexander or Alex Wylie may refer to:

- Alexander Wylie (missionary) (1815–1887), British Christian missionary in China.
- Alexander Wylie, Lord Kinclaven, Scottish judge
- Alexander Wylie (politician) (1838–1921), British MP for Dunbartonshire, 1895–1906
- Alex Wylie (footballer) (1872–1902), Scottish footballer for St Mirren
- Alex Wylie (cricketer), English cricketer

== See also ==
- Alexander Wiley, U.S. senator for Wisconsin
- Alex Wyllie, New Zealand rugby union coach
