= John Wyllie =

John Wyllie may refer to:

- John Wyllie (footballer), Scottish footballer
- John Wyllie (politician) (1835–1870), British politician
- John Wyllie (author), Canadian mystery writer

== See also ==
- John Wiley (disambiguation)
- John Wylie (disambiguation)
- John Wyly (died 1400), member of the Parliament of England for Marlborough
