= Lingguang Temple =

Lingguang Temple (simplified Chinese: 灵光寺; traditional Chinese: 靈光寺; pinyin: Língguāng Sì; lit. 'Temple of Divine Light'), may refer to:

- Lingguang Temple (Beijing), in Shijingshan District of Beijing, China
- Lingguang Temple (Meizhou), in Meixian District of Meizhou, Guangdong, China
