= Wyllie =

Wyllie is a surname. Notable people with the surname include:

- Adrian Wyllie (born 1970), American political activist, radio personality, and investigative journalist
- Alex Wyllie (born 1944), New Zealand rugby union player and coach
- Andrew Wyllie (engineer) (born 1962), Scottish civil engineer
- Andrew Wyllie (pathologist) (1944–2022), Scottish pathologist
- Anne Wyllie (born 1985), New Zealand microbiologist
- Bill Wyllie (c.1932–2006), Australian businessman
- Bob Wyllie (1929–1981), Scottish footballer
- Curzon Wyllie (1848–1909), Indian army officer
- Daniel Wyllie (born 1970), American actor
- Douglas Wyllie (born 1963), Scottish rugby player and coach
- Edward Wyllie (1848–1911), British-American medium
- Elaine Wyllie (born 1953), American neurologist
- Ella Wyllie (born 2002), New Zealand racing cyclist
- George Wyllie (1921–2012), Scottish artist
- George Wyllie (British Army soldier) (1908–1987), British Army soldier and recipient of the George Cross
- Georgia Wyllie (born 2002), Australian cricketer
- Hamish Daud Wyllie (born 1980), Indonesian actor, id:Hamish Daud
- Hugh Wyllie (born 1934), Moderator of the Church of Scotland
- Irvin G. Wyllie (1920–1974), American historian
- James Wyllie (1818–1899), Scottish draughts player
- Jimmy Wyllie (1927–1992), Scottish footballer
- John Wyllie (footballer) (1884–1940), Scottish footballer
- John Wyllie (politician) (1835–1870), British politician
- Kate Wyllie (1840s−1913), New Zealand tribal leader
- Marcus Wyllie (born 1999), English footballer
- Meg Wyllie (1917–2002), American actress
- Peter John Wyllie (born 1930), British petrologist and academic
- Robert Crichton Wyllie (1798–1865), Scottish physician and businessman
- Ross D. Wyllie (born 1944), Australian singer and television presenter
- Teague Wyllie (born 2004), Australian cricketer
- Thomas Wyllie (1872–1943), Scottish football player
- Tony Wyllie (born 1967), American NFL executive
- Tu Wyllie (born 1954), New Zealand politician and rugby player
- William Morrison Wyllie (c. 1820–1895), English painter of coastal and maritime themes
- William Lionel Wyllie (1851–1931), English painter of maritime themes, son of William Morrison Wyllie
- William Wyllie (British Army officer) (1802–1891), Indian Army officer

== See also ==
- Wiley (disambiguation)
- Wily (disambiguation)
- Wylie (disambiguation)
- Wylye (disambiguation)
- Wyle (disambiguation)
- Willey (disambiguation)
- Wyle (disambiguation)
- Wyly
