= Lingguang =

Lingguang may refer to:

== Software ==
- free Vibe Coding App from Ant Group

== Temples ==
- Lingguang Temple (Beijing), in Shijingshan District of Beijing, China
- Lingguang Temple (Meizhou), in Meixian District of Meizhou, Guangdong, China

== People ==
- Ding Lingguang (丁令光), a concubine of Emperor Wu of Liang (484–526)
- Liang Lingguang (1916–2006), a Chinese Communist revolutionary and politician
- Shui Lingguang (水靈光), a character in the Hong Kong novel Banner Hero (大旗英雄傳) by Gu Long
- Ling Guang, a Chinese basketball player

== See also ==
- Linguang (disambiguation)
