= General Clive =

General Clive may refer to:

- Edward Clive (British Army general) (1837–1916), British Army general
- Robert Clive (1725–1774), East India Company Bengal Army major general
- Sidney Clive (1874–1959), British Army lieutenant general
