= Willey =

Willey may refer to:

== Places ==
=== United Kingdom ===
- Willey, Herefordshire, a civil parish of Herefordshire
- Willey, Shropshire, a village in Shropshire
- Willey, Warwickshire, a village and civil parish of Warwickshire
- Hundred of Willey, a hundred of Bedfordshire

=== United States ===
- Mount Willey, a mountain in New Hampshire
- Willey, Iowa, a city
- Willey house (disambiguation), several notable houses

== Other uses ==
- Willey (surname) (including a list of persons with the name)
- Willey Glover Denis (1879–1929, American biochemist and psychologist
- Willey Reveley (1760–1799), English architect
- Willey (textile machine)

== See also ==
- Willy (disambiguation)
- Wiley (disambiguation)
- Whiley
- Wily (disambiguation)
- Wylie (disambiguation)
- Wyllie
- Wylye (disambiguation)
- Wyle (disambiguation)
- Wyly
- Wile E. Coyote and Road Runner, a cartoon character
