= Wildey (surname) =

Wildey is a surname. Notable people with the surname include:

- Doug Wildey (1922–1994), American cartoonist and comic book artist
- Edna Wildey (1882–1970), American tennis player
- Thomas Wildey (1782–1861), British-born American civic leader

== See also ==
- Willey (surname)
