= Thomas Wylie (disambiguation) =

Thomas Wylie (1841–1915) was an Ontario physician and political figure.

Thomas Wylie may also refer to:

- Thomas Wyllie (1870–1943), Scottish footballer (Liverpool)
- Tom Wylie (footballer, born 1896) (1896–?), Scottish footballer (Blackburn Rovers)
- Tom Wylie (footballer, born 1907) (1907–?), Scottish footballer (Sunderland)
