= Andrew Wyllie =

Andrew Wyllie may refer to:

- Andrew Wyllie (pathologist) (1944–2022), Scottish pathologist
- Andrew Wyllie (engineer) (born 1962), Scottish civil engineer

== See also ==
- Andrew Wylie (disambiguation)
