= Willsey =

Willsey is a surname. Notable people with the surname include:

- Jay Wilsey (1896–1961), American film actor
- John Willsey, Canadian curler
- Ray Willsey (1928–2013), American gridiron football player and coach

== See also ==
- Willey (surname)
