= Linguang =

Linguang may refer to:

- Linguang metro station, a station on the Brown Line of the Taipei Metro
- L. G. Tang (Linguang Tang), a professor of physics at the School of Science at the Hampton University, Hampton, Virginia

== See also ==
- Lingguang (disambiguation)
