= General Creagh =

General Creagh may refer to:

- Michael O'Moore Creagh (1892–1970), British Army major general
- O'Moore Creagh (1848–1923), British Army general

== See also ==
- Charles Creagh-Osborne (1823–1892), British Army lieutenant general
- Steven A. Cray (born 1964), U.S. Air Force major general
