= Robert Davies (British Army officer) =

British Royal Engineer awarded the George Cross (1900–1975)

Robert John Davies
- Born: 3 October 1900; Newlyn, England
- Died: 27 September 1975 (aged 74); Sydney, Australia
- Military career
- Allegiance: Canada; United Kingdom
- Branch: Canadian Army; British Army
- Service years: c. 1918; 1940–1942
- Rank: Lieutenant
- Nickname: "Jock"
- Unit: Royal Engineers
- Conflicts: First World War; Second World War: The Blitz
- Awards: George Cross

Robert John Davies, GC (3 October 1900 – 27 September 1975) was a Royal Engineers officer who was awarded the George Cross (GC) for the heroism he displayed in defusing a bomb which threatened to destroy St Paul's Cathedral on 12 September 1940.

== Early life ==
Davies was born in Newlyn, Cornwall, the son of John Sampson Davies of St Erth and Annie Vingoe. Davies had emigrated to Canada and joined the Canadian Army in 1918. He returned to Cornwall in the 1930s, and on 6 March 1940 was commissioned as a second lieutenant in the Royal Engineers, serving as a bomb disposal officer during the Blitz.

== George Cross ==
On the night 8/9 September 1940, a Luftwaffe air raid on the city of London resulted in an unexploded bomb landing very close to St Paul's Cathedral. The bomb was lodged 27 feet deep in Deans Yard (close to the west end of the cathedral) and took three days to dig out. It was placed on two lorries (joined in tandem) and Davies drove it through deserted streets to Hackney Marshes where it was safely destroyed.

=== Citation ===
The citation from a supplement to the London Gazette of 27 September 1940 (dated 30 September 1940) reads:

The King has been graciously pleased to approve the award of the George Cross to the undermentioned:—

Temporary Lieutenant Robert Davies, Royal Engineers.
Lieutenant Davies was the officer in charge of the party detailed to recover the bomb which fell in the vicinity of St. Paul's Cathedral.
So conscious was this officer of the imminent danger to the Cathedral that regardless of personal risk he spared neither himself nor his men in their efforts to locate the bomb. After unremitting effort, during which all ranks knew that an explosion might occur at any moment, the bomb was successfully extricated.

In order to shield his men from further danger, Lieutenant Davies himself drove the vehicle in which the bomb was removed and personally carried out its disposal.

Sapper George Cameron Wylie was also awarded the George Cross for his part in the same action.

Sergeant James Wilson and Lance-Corporal Herbert Leigh were awarded the British Empire Medal (for meritorious service) (BEM) for their part in the action.

== Later war career ==
After defusing the St Paul's bomb, Davies then served in the Middle East, but returned to the United Kingdom for an investiture at Buckingham Palace in February 1942.

=== Court-martial ===
In May 1942, Davies was court-martialled and convicted of eight charges of fraud, obtaining money dishonestly, and theft. He also pleaded guilty to 13 further charges of issuing cheques without ensuring he had sufficient funds to draw on. He was cashiered on 1 June 1942, and sentenced to two years' imprisonment, reduced to 18 months following review by the General Officer Commanding, London District.

He afterwards migrated to Australia. In 1955 he was appointed by the Chief Engineer (EPC Hughes) of the Portland (Victoria) Harbour Trust, then under construction as Construction Engineer overseeing all work being performed in quarries, on the two breakwaters and wharves. His appointment was unannounced and resented by some of the existing technical staff who openly raised questions about his background, experience and qualifications. No verifiable information was made public. He lived with his wife and daughter in a Harbour Trust housing community and is believed to have continued this role until the completion of the Harbour construction in the late 1950s.

After Portland he moved to and lived with his family in Kogarah, Sydney. Nothing is known of this period of his life

The Times of 1 October 1970 reported that his medal had been sold for a then record £2,100. It is now on display at the Imperial War Museum. Upon his death on 27 September 1975 he was cremated and his remains interred at the Northern Suburbs Crematorium, Sydney. His interment niche is located in the "OT" wall, niche 175.

== See also ==
- George Wyllie (GC)
