= Lord Kinclaven =

Lord Kinclaven may refer to

- John Stewart, Earl of Carrick, created a peer as Lord Kinclaven in 1607; title extinct on his death c. 1645
- Sandy Wylie, Lord Kinclaven (born 1951), appointed a judge with the title Lord Kinclaven in 2005
