= Wyly =

Wyly is a surname. Notable people with the surname include:

- Charles Wyly (1933–2011), American businessman
- L. D. Wyly (1916–2004), American scientist
- Michael Wyly (born c. 1939), American Marines colonel
- Sam Wyly (born 1934), American businessman

== See also ==
- Dee and Charles Wyly Theatre, in Dallas, Texas
- Wiley (disambiguation)
- Whiley
- Wily (disambiguation)
- Wylie (disambiguation)
- Wyllie
- Willey (disambiguation)
- Wylye (disambiguation)
- Wyle (disambiguation)
