= 1871 Hereford by-election =

UK Parliamentary by-election

The 1871 Hereford by-election was held on 28 February 1871. It was caused by the resignation of the incumbent MP of the Liberal Party, Edward Henry Clive. It was won by the Conservative candidate George Arbuthnot.
