= Andrew Wylie =

Andrew Wylie may refer to:

- Andrew Wylie (footballer), manager of Reading Football Club, England between 1926 and 1931
- Andrew Wylie (college president) (1789–1851), first president of Indiana University
- Andrew Wylie (judge) (1814–1905), US federal judge
- Andrew Wylie (literary agent) (born 1947), agent for high-profile authors including Martin Amis, Salman Rushdie and Philip Roth
- Andrew Wylie (American football) (born 1994), American football offensive tackle
- Andrew Wylie (cricketer) (born 1971), South African cricketer
- Andrew Wylie (skier) (born 1961), British Olympic skier
- Sir Andrew Wylie, fictional protagonist of the novel Sir Andrew Wylie, of that Ilk (1822) by the novelist John Galt
- Sir Andrew Graham Wylie (born 1959), British businessman

== See also ==
- Andrew Wyllie (disambiguation)
- Wylie (surname)
