= David Wylie =

David Wylie may refer to:

- David Wylie (footballer) (born 1966), former Scottish football goalkeeper
- David Wylie (author) (born 1929), author of the book City, Save Thyself! - Nuclear Terror and the Urban Ballot
- David James Wylie (1859–1932), English-born civil engineer, farmer, rancher and political figure in Saskatchewan
