= Archer Clive =

British Army officer (1903–1995)

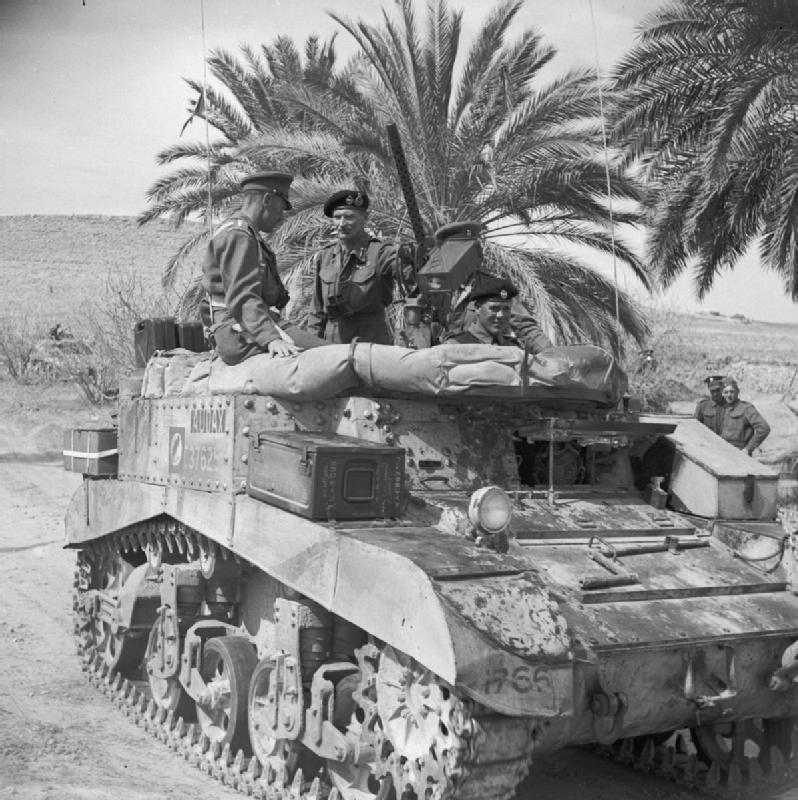
- General Sir Bernard Montgomery with Lieutenant Colonel A. F. C. Clive, CO of the 6th Battalion, Grenadier Guards, in a turretless Stuart command tank, 8 March 1943.
- Born: 24 June 1903; London, England
- Died: March 1995 (aged 91); Ross-on-Wye, Herefordshire, England
- Relatives: Sir George Clive (father); Gerald Berkeley Portman, 7th Viscount Portman (father-in-law)
- Military career
- Allegiance: United Kingdom
- Branch: British Army
- Service years: 1923–1947
- Rank: Brigadier
- Service number: 23788
- Unit: Grenadier Guards
- Commands: 6th Battalion, Grenadier Guards; 24th Guards Brigade
- Conflicts: World War II
- Awards: Distinguished Service Order and bar Military Cross
- Other work: Justice of the Peace; Deputy Lieutenant of Herefordshire

Brigadier Archer Francis Lawrence Clive, DSO and bar, MC KStJ (24 June 1903, in London – March 1995, in Ross-on-Wye, Herefordshire) was a British Army officer who served during World War II.

== Family ==
Clive was the son of Lieutenant-General Sir George Sidney Clive and Madeline Buxton. He was educated at New Beacon School, Sevenoaks, Harrow School (January 1917-?) and the Royal Military College, Sandhurst.

He was married twice; firstly on 8 February 1934 to the Honourable Penelope Isobel Portman (daughter of Gerald Berkeley Portman, 7th Viscount Portman). The couple had two children (a son and a daughter); they were divorced in 1949. His second marriage was to Olivia Mary Beatrice Stanley, on 3 October 1950.

== Military career ==
After graduating from Sandhurst, Clive was commissioned as a second lieutenant into the Grenadier Guards on 1 February 1923. Promoted on 1 February 1925 to lieutenant, from May 1928 to August 1930, he was attached to the Sudan Defence Force (SDF). Returning to England, from 1938 to 1939 he attended the Staff College, Camberley.

From September 1939 until July 1940, he served with the British Expeditionary Force (BEF), first as a General Staff Officer, 3rd grade (GSO3), then from March 1940 as a brigade major. He was awarded the Military Cross in July 1940 for his services with the BEF. Clive then served at the War Office as a General Staff Officer, 2nd grade (GSO2), until 15 February 1941, when, promoted to the acting rank of lieutenant colonel, he was appointed Commanding Officer (CO) of the 6th Battalion, Grenadier Guards. The battalion was a war-raised unit composed mainly of civilian soldiers who had volunteered for the army, along with a few Regulars. After training in England the battalion was sent overseas in June 1942, arriving in Syria where, in October, it was assigned to Brigadier Julian Gascoigne's 201st Guards Brigade. Together with the rest of the brigade, Clive's battalion was sent to Tunisia to become part of the British Eighth Army, where it was engaged in the final stages of the Tunisian Campaign, notably at the Battle of the Mareth Line in mid-March, where the battalion suffered heavily. For his service with the Grenadiers in North Africa, he received his first Distinguished Service Order.

For six months between 12 August 1943 and 13 February 1944, Clive performed staff officer (GS01) roles with 203 Military Mission and then with the 21st Army Group. After this, he became commander of the 24th Guards Brigade, as a temporary brigadier, in Italy until the end of October 1944. For his service in Italy, he was awarded a bar to his DSO. Clive was a member of the Military Mission to South Africa between 1945 and 1946.

Clive retired from active service, with the honorary rank of brigadier, late of the Grenadier Guards, on 9 December 1947, being listed in the Regular Army Reserve of Officers until 24 September 1958. He was appointed a Justice of the Peace in 1953 and Deputy Lieutenant for Herefordshire on 24 May 1960.

== Awards and decorations ==
- Distinguished Service Order and bar
- Military Cross (11 July 1940)
- Knight of the Order of St John (July 1985, previously Commander (January 1971) and Officer (September 1966) of the Order)
