= Ed V. Hungerford III =

American particle physicist

- Citizenship: United States
- Education: Georgia Institute of Technology (BS); Georgia Institute of Technology (PhD)
- Known for: Hypernuclear Physics; Hypernuclear Spectroscopy
- Scientific career
- Fields: Physics
- Workplaces: University of Houston; Rice University
- Thesis: Transverse Polarization of Beta Particles.. (1967)
- Doctoral advisor: L. D. Wyly
- Doctoral students: L. G. Tang

Ed Vernon Hungerford III is an American experimental particle and nuclear physicist and one of the prominent international particle physicists working in known for his work in hypernuclear physics. He is Professor Emeritus of Physics at the University of Houston, where he held the M.D. Anderson Professorship until his retirement. Hungerford is recognized for contributions to hypernuclear spectroscopy, medium-energy nuclear physics, and collaborative dark matter research, including work on the DarkSide-50 experiment.

He is Professor Emeritus of Physics at the University of Houston, where he held the M.D. Anderson Professorship until his retirement. Hungerford is recognized for contributions to hypernuclear spectroscopy, medium-energy nuclear physics, and collaborative dark matter research, including work on the DarkSide-50 experiment. Since 2011, he was MD Anderson Professor of Physics at the Department of Physics, University of Houston, where he has been leading his research group (Medium-Energy Nuclear and Particle Physics group). He is known for his significant contributions to the field of hypernuclear physics and hypernuclear spectroscopy, with more than hundred important research papers, multiple grants and more than twenty successful PhD students advised during his highly-productive career.

== Education and Early Career ==
Hungerford received both his B.S. and Ph.D. in physics from the Georgia Institute of Technology. His doctoral thesis, completed in 1967, focused on transverse polarization in beta decay. He began his research career at Oak Ridge National Laboratory and served as an assistant professor of physics at Rice University.

== Career ==
Hungerford joined the University of Houston faculty in the early 1970s, where he taught and led experimental research programs in nuclear and particle physics for over four decades. From 2011 until his retirement, he held the M.D. Anderson Professorship in Physics and led the Medium-Energy Nuclear and Particle Physics group at UH.

He has conducted experiments at Fermilab, Brookhaven National Laboratory, US Thomas Jefferson National Laboratory and Oak Ridge National Laboratory, focusing on hypernuclear formation and spectroscopy. His work contributed to the development of instrumentation and methods for medium-energy physics studies.

Later in his career, Hungerford joined international dark matter collaborations, including MAX and DarkSide-50, which uses a liquid argon time projection chamber to search for weakly interacting massive particles (WIMPs). He continued publishing research as part of these collaborations into the 2020s, after attaining emeritus status.

He previously served as chair of the Department of Physics at the University of Houston, and participated in multiple academic and national scientific committees. His teaching has been recognized by awards such as “Outstanding Educator of America,” “Top Professor,” and “Outstanding Professor of the Year,” as elected by students at the University of Houston.

Hungerford joined the University of Houston faculty in the early 1970s, where he taught and led experimental research programs in nuclear and particle physics for over four decades. From 2011 until his retirement, he held the M.D. Anderson Professorship in Physics. He was also the head of the Medium-Energy Nuclear and Particle Physics group at UH.

Hungerford is a fellow of the American Physical Society and the American Association for Advancement of Science. He is a member of the American Association of Physics Teachers.

== Personal life ==
Hungerford was married to Mary Dennard Hungerford for 58 years, until her death in April 2020 from complications related to COVID-19 and Alzheimer's disease. They had two children. Their son serves as a Foreign Service officer with the U.S. State Department. Their daughter, Dr. Catherine Hungerford Scott, is a dyslexia therapist and teacher educator who serves as Chief Academic Officer at the Neuhaus Education Center in Houston.
