= James Dunlop (footballer) =

Scottish footballer

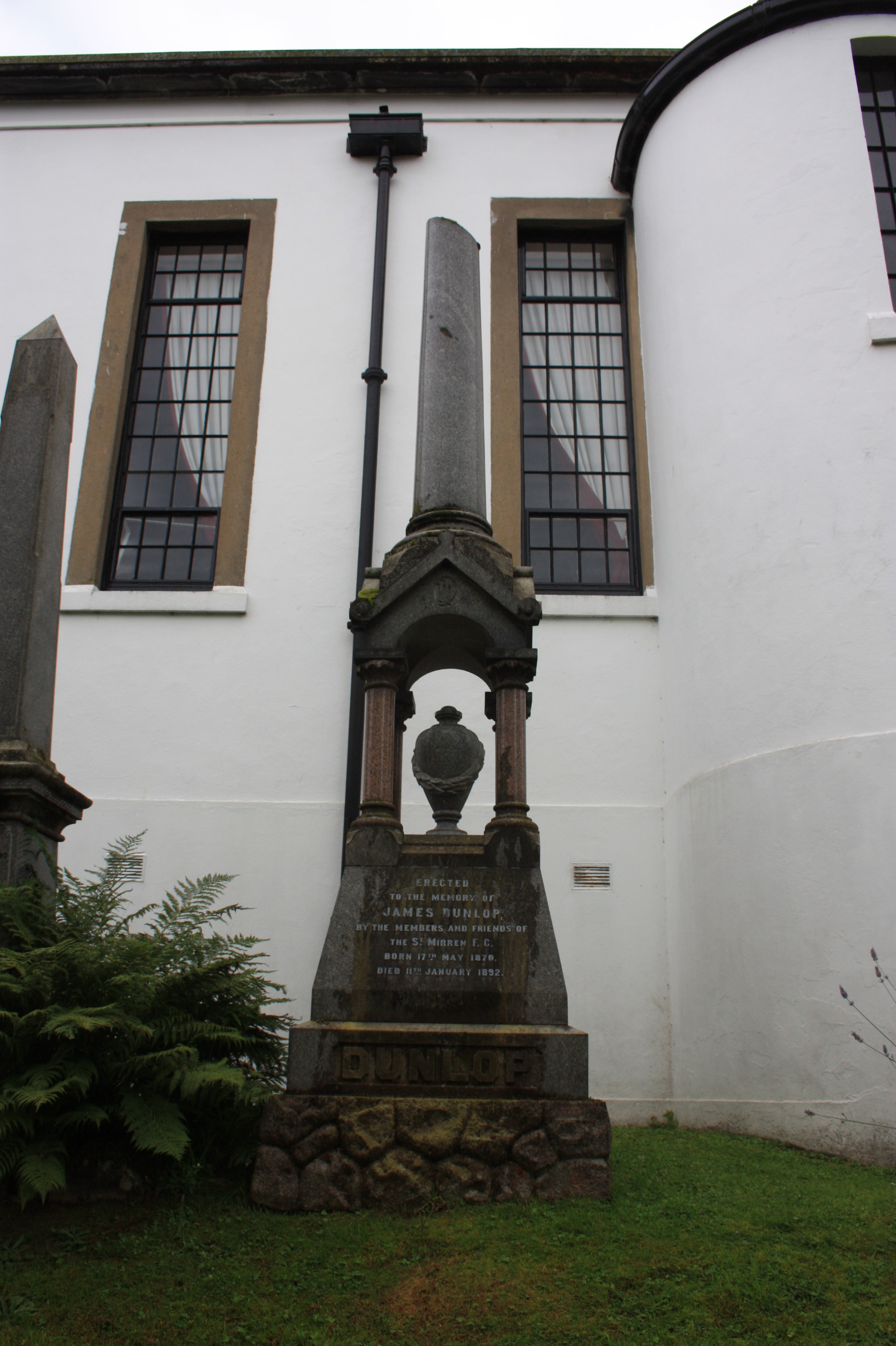
- The grave of James Dunlop – Woodside Cemetery, Paisley

Personal information
- Date of birth: 17 May 1870
- Place of birth: Gourock, Scotland
- Date of death: 11 January 1892 (aged 21)
- Place of death: Paisley, Scotland
- Position: Inside left

Youth career
- Underwood Strollers

Senior career*
Years	Team	Apps	(Gls)
1888–1892	St Mirren	33	(10)

International career
1890	Scotland	1	(0)
- * Club domestic league appearances and goals

James Dunlop (17 May 1870 – 11 January 1892) was a Scottish footballer who played for St Mirren and Scotland. Dunlop cut his knee while playing for St Mirren (where he had risen to the position of club captain) and subsequently died due to a tetanus infection, aged 21.

He is buried in Woodside Cemetery in western Paisley. The grave stands at the top of the hill against the north side of the crematorium.

== See also ==
- List of association footballers who died while playing
