= Evan Pateshall =

British politician (1817–1885)

Evan Pateshall MP

Member of Parliament for Hereford
- In office 3 February 1874 – 14 March 1878 Serving with George Clive
- Preceded by: George Arbuthnot; Chandos Wren-Hoskyns
- Succeeded by: George Arbuthnot; George Clive

Personal details
- Born: Evan Thomas; December 1817
- Died: April 9, 1885 (aged 67)
- Party: Conservative
- Spouse: Anne Elizabeth Pateshall (m. 1842)
- Education: King's College London

Evan Pateshall (born Evan Thomas; December 1817 – 9 April 1885) was a Conservative Party politician.

== Personal life ==
Pateshall was born as Evan Thomas in December 1817 to David Thomas of Radnorshire. He was educated at Shrewsbury School and King's College London. He married Anne Elizabeth Pateshall, only child of William Pateshall, in 1842 and changed his surname to Pateshall in 1855. He lived at Allensmore Court in Allensmore, Herefordshire.

== Political career ==
Pateshall was Mayor of Hereford in 1863, before being elected Conservative MP for Hereford constituency in 1874. He then resigned after four years in 1878.

== Other activities ==
During his life, Pateshall was a Justice of the Peace, a Deputy Lieutenant for each of Herefordshire, Brecon and Radnor, and commanded one of the companies of the Hereford Rifle Volunteers.

Parliament of the United Kingdom
Preceded by George Arbuthnot and Chandos Wren-Hoskyns	Member of Parliament for Hereford; 1874 – 1878; With: George Clive	Succeeded by George Arbuthnot and George Clive
