= George Arbuthnot (politician) =

British politician

Colonel George Arbuthnot JP DL

Member of Parliament for Hereford
- In office 1878–1880 Serving with Evan Pateshall
- Preceded by: Evan Pateshall; George Clive
- Succeeded by: Joseph Pulley; Robert Reid
- In office 1871–1874 Serving with Chandos Wren-Hoskyns
- Preceded by: Edward Clive; Chandos Wren-Hoskyns
- Succeeded by: Evan Pateshall; George Clive

Personal details
- Born: George John Alves Arbuthnot; 9 January 1836 Madras, Madras Presidency, British India
- Died: 26 December 1912 (aged 76)
- Spouse: Caroline Emma Nepean Aitchison (m. 1870; died 1912)
- Children: 6
- Parent(s): John Alves Arbuthnot; Mary Arbuthnot

George Arbuthnot of Norton Court (9 January 1836 – 26 December 1912) was a British politician.

== Life ==
Arbuthnot was born on 9 January 1836 in Madras, British India. He was the son of John Alves Arbuthnot of Coworth Park, Old Windsor, Sunningdale, Berkshire, and wife and cousin Mary Arbuthnot. His father was a co-founder of Arbuthnot Latham, a private bank.

== Career ==
Arbuthnot was Member of Parliament for Hereford from 1871 to 1874 and from 1878 to 1880. He served in the Royal Horse Artillery, reaching the rank of colonel, and was Justice of Peace of Herefordshire and Gloucestershire, and Deputy Lieutenant for Herefordshire.

== Personal life ==
On 12 October 1870, he married Caroline Emma Nepean Aitchison (1848–1927), daughter of Capt. Andrew Nepean Aitchison, of the 13th Natal Infantry, Honorable East India Company Service, and Frances Matilda Farish (a daughter of James Farish, acting Governor of Bombay). Her paternal grandfather was Major General Andrew Aitchison of Ryde, Isle of Wight. Together, they had six children:

- Frances Muriel Arbuthnot (1871–1933), who married Stephen Karl J. Brichta, son of Philip Brichta, in 1910. After his death in 1929, she married Gilbert Amos Reeve of the Indian Police, in 1929.
- John Bernard Arbuthnot (1875–1950), who married Olive Blake, the only daughter of Sir Henry Arthur Blake and Edith Bernal Osborne (sister of the Duchess of St Albans).
- Dorothy Gertrude Arbuthnot (1878–1957), who married Brig.-Gen. Hugh Frederick Bateman-Champain in 1904.
- Mary Christobel Arbuthnot (b. 1879), who married George Archibald Wallace Young, son of Archibald Young of Wellington House, Lancashire, in 1907. After his death, she married Capt. Alexander Gifford Ludford-Astley of the 14th King's Hussars, son of The Rev. Benjamin Buckler Gifford Ludford-Astley, in 1914. After he was killed in action in Mesopotamia during World War I in 1917, she married Col. Edgar James Brydges, Colonel of the 14th King's Hussars, son of John Henry Brydges of The Court, Eastbourne, Sussex, and of Fedderate, Aberdeenshire, in 1922.
- Hugh Archibald Arbuthnot (1885–1950), who married Mabel Eleanor Jackson, daughter of Henry Jackson, in 1917. They divorced in 1928 and he married Margaret Anne Reid, daughter of comedian Andrew Reid, in 1928.
- Ronald George Urquhart Arbuthnot (1891–1918), a Lieutenant of the 16th Lancers and in the Royal Air Force who was killed while flying on active service in the First World War.

Arbuthnot died on 26 December 1912. His widow died on 16 March 1927 and was buried with him at Holy Trinity Churchyard, Sunningdale, Berkshire.

=== Descendants ===
Through his daughter Mary, he was a grandfather of Peter Leslie Young, who married Pamela Clare Gaitskell, Doreen Duff, and Joan Laing (formerly Barnes and Richardson), and was the great-grandfather of Michael Arbuthnot Young (b. 1930), who married Susanna Elizabeth Barclay (daughter of Theodore David Barclay, Chairman of Barclays Bank).

Parliament of the United Kingdom
Preceded by Edward Clive; Chandos Wren-Hoskyns	Member of Parliament for Hereford; 1871–1874; With: Chandos Wren-Hoskyns	Succeeded by Evan Pateshall; George Clive
Preceded by Evan Pateshall; George Clive	Member of Parliament for Hereford; 1878–1880; With: Evan Pateshall	Succeeded by Joseph Pulley; Robert Reid
