= Duntocher Harp F.C. =

Association football club in Dunbartonshire, Scotland

Duntocher Harp
- Full name: Duntocher Harp Football Club
- Nickname: the Harp
- Founded: 1888
- Dissolved: 1897
- Ground: St Helena Park
- Secretary: J. Gallagher
Home colours

Duntocher Harp Football Club was an association football club based in the village of Duntocher, in West Dunbartonshire, which entered the Scottish Cup in the late 19th century.

== History ==
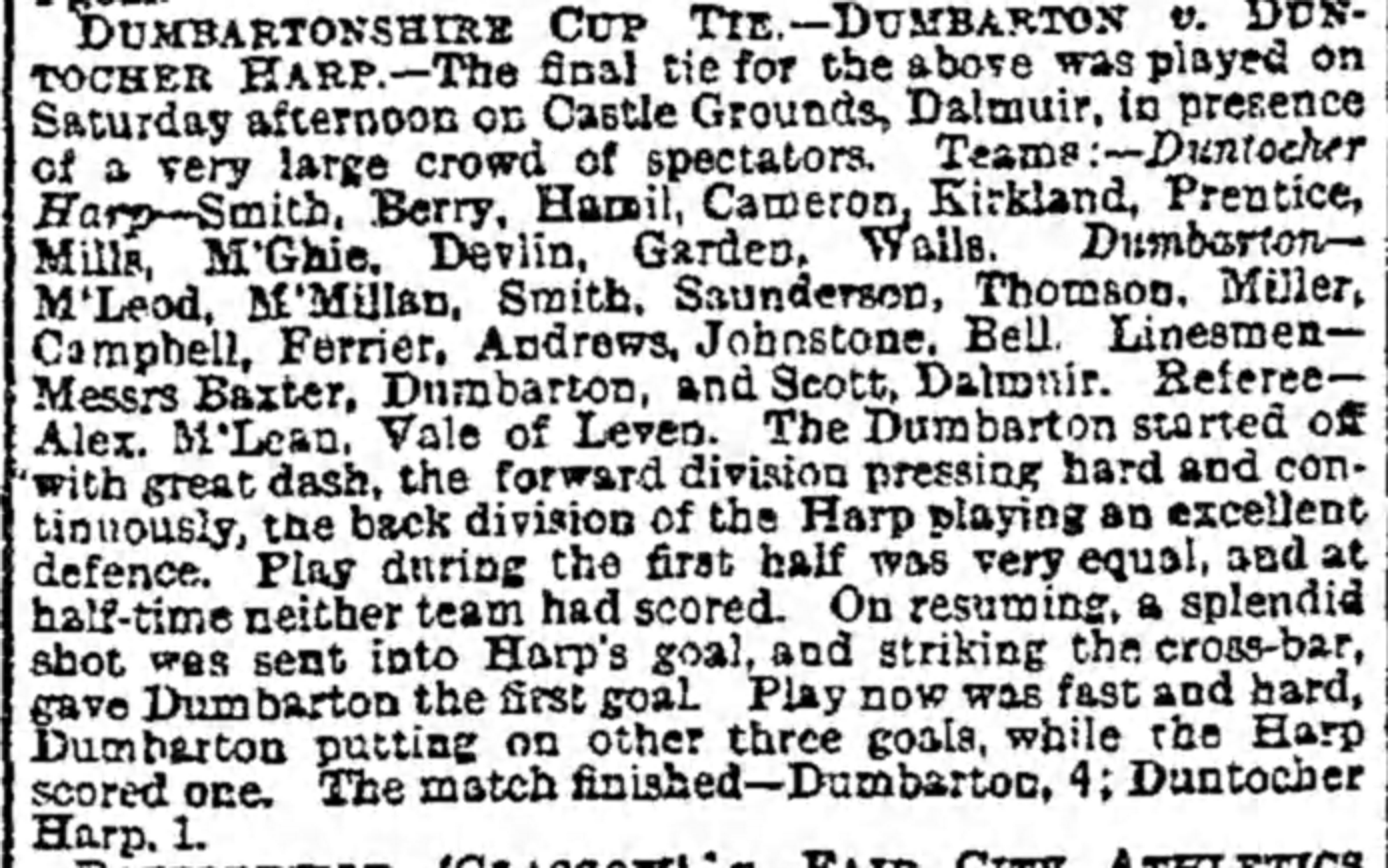
1893–94 Dumbartonshire Cup Final, Dumbarton 4–1 Duntocher Harp, Glasgow Herald, 23 April 1894

The first references to the club are from the 1888–89 season, when the club was playing Junior-level football; the season's highlight was winning the Buchanan Charity Cup, played for by clubs from Old and New Kilpatrick. The club won the competition twice more, in 1890–91 and 1891–92, after which the cup was retired.

After winning the competition for the first time, the club joined the Scottish Football Association, and entered the 1889–90 Scottish Cup. The Harp was drawn at home to Smithstone Hibs and enjoyed an easy 5–0 win. In the second round, the club was drawn at home to Vale of Leven Wanderers, who had reached the quarter-final the previous season, and Wanderers won 4–3; the Harp had taken a 3–1 half-time lead, but the Wanderers had the benefit of the wind and slope in the second half.

The club did not renew its subscription to the Scottish FA in 1890, but rejoined in 1891; by this time, the Scottish FA had introduced qualifying rounds for the Cup, and Harp never qualified for the first round proper.

The Harp entered the Dumbartonshire Cup for the first time in 1889–90, but did not win a tie in it until 1893–94, when it beat the junior side Radnor Park 9–0, the club's record competitive victory. The Harp won twice more in the competition that season to reach the final for the only time, but lost 4–1 to Dumbarton, which, by this time, had joined the Scottish League, along with other county sides Renton and Vale of Leven. This had decimated the smaller clubs in the county and by the time the Harp was dissolved, there was only one senior side left in Dumbartonshire outside the League.

The final competitive matches for the Harp were in the Scottish Qualifying Cup in 1896–97. The club beat Helensburgh Union 6–0 in a first preliminary round replay - the original tie ending 4–4, but Harp, in an indication of the club's problems, having to play out the entire tie with 9 men - but lost 8–2 at Royal Albert in the second. The club was formally struck off the Scottish FA roll in August 1897.

== Colours ==
The club's colours were consistently green jerseys and hose, but the knickers changed in 1891 from navy blue to black, and in 1894 to white.

== Ground ==
The club started out at St Helena Park in Duntocher. In 1894 it moved to Fore Park.

== Notable players ==
- Pat Smith, goalkeeper, who left for Partick Thistle in 1894–95, but, because he had played for the Harp in a pre-season 5-a-side tournament, was declared ineligible for other Cup competitions that year, resulting in the overturning of a Partick win over Rangers
