= 1878 Hereford by-election =

UK Parliamentary by-election

The 1878 Hereford by-election was fought on 14 March 1878. The by-election was fought due to the resignation of the incumbent Conservative MP, Evan Pateshall. It was won by the Conservative candidate George Arbuthnot.
