= Willey house =

Willey house may refer to:

- Malcolm Willey House, a historic house designed by Frank Lloyd Wright in 1934 located in Minneapolis, Minnesota
- Waitman T. Willey House, a historic home dating to 1839–40 located in Morgantown, West Virginia
- Willey House (New Hampshire), the site of notable landslide in 1826 that resulted in nine deaths

== See also ==
- Willey (disambiguation)
