= Wyle =

Wyle or WYLE may refer to:

- WYLE (FM), a radio station (95.1 FM) licensed to serve Grove City, Pennsylvania, United States
- WYLE (TV), commercial television station in Florence, Alabama
- Wyle Laboratories, provider of specialized engineering, scientific and technical services

People

- Florence Wyle (1881–1968), American-born Canadian sculptor and designer
- George Wyle (1916–2003), American orchestra leader and composer
- Noah Wyle (born 1971), American actor
- Walter de la Wyle, Bishop of Salisbury from 1263 to 1271

== See also ==
- Wiley (disambiguation)
- John Wiley (disambiguation)
- Whiley
- Wily (disambiguation)
- Wylie (disambiguation)
- Wyllie
- Willey (disambiguation)
- Wylye (disambiguation)
- Wyly
