= John Wiley =

John Wiley may refer to:

- Wiley (publisher), formerly John Wiley & Sons
- John A. Wiley (1843–1909), Pennsylvania businessman, National Guard and Civil War soldier
- John Cooper Wiley (1893–1967), US foreign service officer and ambassador
- John D. Wiley (born 1942), former Chancellor of the University of Wisconsin–Madison
- John F. Wiley (1920–2013), American football player and coach
- John M. Wiley (1841–1912), U.S. Representative from New York
- John Wiley Bryant (born 1947), Texas politician
- John Wiley (politician) (1927–1987), South African cricketer and politician

== See also ==
- John W. Willey (1797–1841), American politician and first mayor of Cleveland, Ohio, 1836–1837
- John Wyly (died 1400), MP for Marlborough
- John Wylie (disambiguation)
- John Wyllie (disambiguation)
