= Willey (surname) =

Willey is a surname of British origin. It may refer to:

- Alan Willey (actor) (1909–1961), Australian-American actor; later stage name Alan Marshal
- Alan Willey (footballer, born 1941) (1941–2017), English forward
- Alan Willey (footballer, born 1956), English striker and American soccer player
- Arthur Willey (1867–1942), British zoologist
- Arthur Wellesley Willey (1868–1923), English solicitor and M.P.
- Basil Willey (1897–1978), British historian and literary critic
- Calvin Willey (1776–1858), American politician
- Carl Willey (1931–2009), American baseball player
- Dave Willey (born 1963), American experimental musician and composer
- David Willey (cricketer) (born 1990), British cricketer
- David Willey (physicist) (born 1947), American physicist
- Edward E. Willey (1910–1986), American politician
- Frederick Willey (1910–1987), British politician
- Gordon Willey (1913–2002), American archaeologist
- Henry Willey (1824–1907), American lichenologist and newspaper editor
- Hubert James Willey (1897–1948), British soldier
- James Willey (born 1939), American composer
- Kathleen Willey (born 1946), American political aide
- N. B. Willey (1838–1921), American politician
- Neil Willey (born 1976), British swimmer
- Norm Willey (1927–2011), American football player
- Peter Willey (born 1949), British cricketer
- Ron Willey (1929–2004), Australian rugby league player and coach
- Dr. Samuel H. Willey (1821–1914), co-founder of College of California
- Vernon Willey (1884–1982), British politician
- Waitman T. Willey (1811–1900), American politician
- Walt Willey (born 1951), American actor

== See also ==
- Willey (disambiguation)
- Wiley (disambiguation)
- Willy (disambiguation)
