= George Clive (Liberal politician) =

British barrister, magistrate and politician

George Clive MP, DL, JP
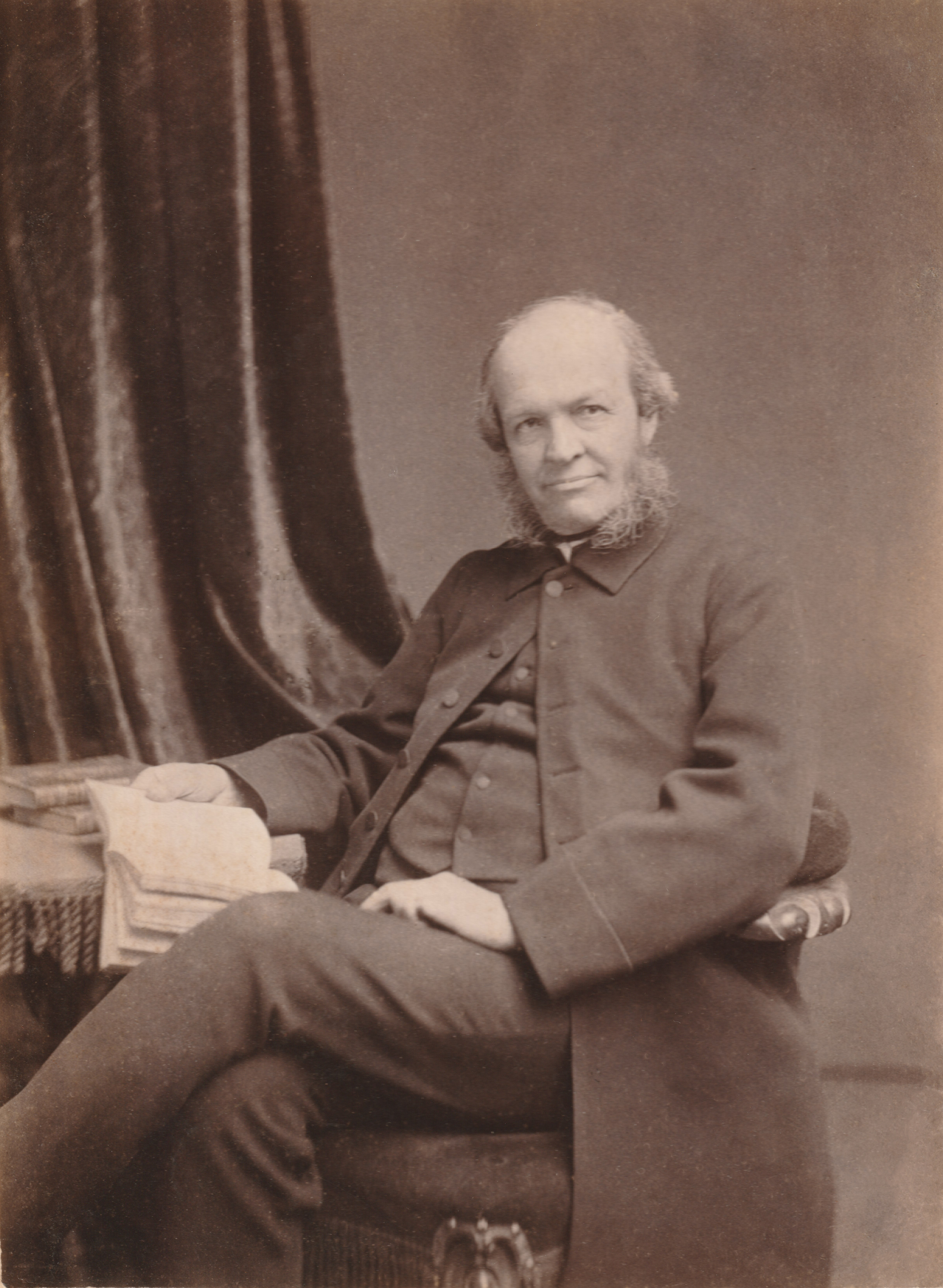

Under-Secretary of State for the Home Department
- In office 18 June 1859 – 14 November 1862
- Monarch: Victoria
- Prime Minister: The Viscount Palmerston
- Preceded by: Gathorne Hardy
- Succeeded by: Henry Bruce

Personal details
- Born: 22 October 1805 Verdun, Meuse, France
- Died: 8 June 1880 (aged 74)
- Party: Liberal
- Spouse: Ann Farquhar (d. 1907)
- Children: Edward Clive (son); Mary Kathleen (daughter)
- Education: Brasenose College, Oxford

George Clive DL JP (22 October 1805 – 8 June 1880) was a British barrister, magistrate and Liberal politician.

== Background and education ==
A member of the Clive (now Herbert) family headed by the Earl of Powis, George Clive was a younger son of Edward Clive and great-grandson of Reverend Benjamin Clive, uncle of Robert Clive, 1st Baron Clive ("Clive of India"). His mother was the Hon. Harriett, daughter of Andrew Archer, 2nd Baron Archer. He was educated at Harrow and Brasenose College, Oxford, and was called to the Bar, Lincoln's Inn, in 1830.

== Legal career ==
Clive was appointed a Revising Barrister for Droitwich before 1837 and became a Police Magistrate of London between 1839 and 1847. Between 1847 and 1857 he was a County Court Judge for Southwark. From 1857 to 1870 he was a Recorder of Wokingham.

== Political career ==
Clive entered Parliament for Hereford in 1857, a seat he held until 1868 and again between 1874 and 1880. He served under Lord Palmerston as Under-Secretary of State for the Home Department from 1859 to 1862.

== Family ==
Clive married Ann Sybella Martha, daughter of Sir Thomas Harvie Farquhar, 2nd Baronet, in 1835. They had several children, including General Edward Clive, father of Sir Sidney Clive, and Kathleen Mary. He died on 8 June 1880, aged 74. His wife remained a widow until her death in February 1907.

Parliament of the United Kingdom
Preceded by Sir Robert Price, Bt; Henry Morgan-Clifford	Member of Parliament for Hereford; 1857–1869; With: Henry Morgan-Clifford 1857–1865; Richard Baggallay 1865–1868; John Wyllie 1868–1869	Succeeded by Edward Clive; Chandos Wren-Hoskyns
Preceded by Chandos Wren-Hoskyns; George Arbuthnot	Member of Parliament for Hereford; 1874–1880; With: Evan Pateshall 1874–1878; George Arbuthnot 1878–1880	Succeeded by Joseph Pulley; Robert Reid
Political offices
Preceded by Gathorne Hardy	Under-Secretary of State for the Home Department; 1859–1862	Succeeded by Henry Bruce
