= Alex Wylie (footballer) =

Scottish footballer

Personal information
- Full name: Alexander Wylie
- Date of birth: 4 November 1872
- Place of birth: Crosslee, Scotland
- Date of death: 21 April 1902 (aged 29)
- Place of death: Paisley, Scotland
- Position: Inside left

Youth career
- Blackstoun Rangers

Senior career*
Years	Team	Apps	(Gls)
1890–1901	St Mirren	162	(54)
Total		162	(54)

International career
1893	Scottish League XI	1	(0)
- * Club domestic league appearances and goals

Alexander Wylie (4 November 1872 – 21 April 1902) was a Scottish footballer who played mainly as an inside left.

== Career ==
His only club at the professional level was St Mirren, where he spent eleven seasons (all in the Scottish Football League's top division), making 190 appearances for the Buddies in the two major competitions and scoring 73 goals. He is known to have won the regional Renfrewshire Cup at least twice, scoring in the finals of 1891 and 1894, and been a losing finalist in 1892.

Wylie was selected once for the Scottish Football League XI against the Irish League XI in April 1893; in the absence of any Rangers or Celtic players who were excused due to their involvement in a pivotal league fixture on the same day, the understrength Scottish team lost 3–2. Wylie had to leave the field in the first half due to injury, with clubmate Andrew Brown allowed to replace him as a substitute (which had to be approved by the host body). Although St Mirren were also in contention for the SFL title, Brown and Wylie were accompanied by Edward McBain for the match in Belfast, and their club met Third Lanark without them, losing 6–1.

== Personal life ==
Wylie was born in the village of Crosslee in Renfrewshire; his father died in 1875 and the family moved within the county, first to Lochwinnoch then to Paisley. Having found a trade as an engineer in a paper mill, he was forced to retire from playing football in 1901 due to suffering from tuberculosis – he was unable to recover from the illness and died in April 1902, aged 29. A friendly match between St Mirren and Rangers a month later had already been planned with the intention of the proceeds going to him; instead they were given to his mother and family.
