= Samuel Brown Wylie =

Ireland-born oriental and classical scholar

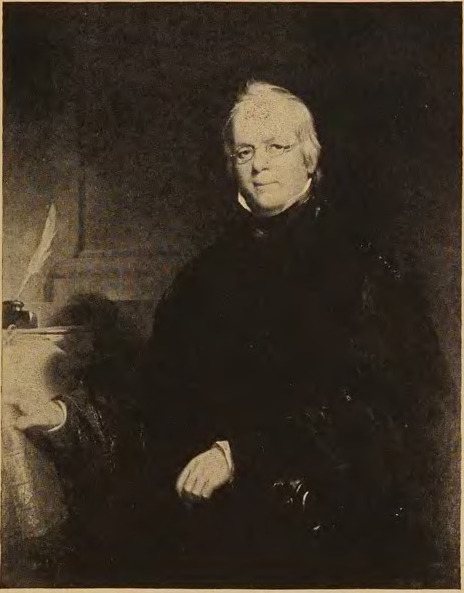
- Portrait of Wylie by John Neagle
- Born: 21 May 1773; Ballymena, Ireland
- Died: 14 October 1852 (aged 79); Philadelphia, United States

Samuel Brown Wylie (21 May 1773 – 14 October 1852) was an Ireland-born oriental and classical scholar.

Wylie was born near Ballymena, on 21 May 1773. He was educated at Glasgow and removed to Philadelphia in 1797, where he became Professor of Theology in the Reformed Presbyterian Church, a position he held for more than forty years. He was Professor of Ancient Languages in the University of Philadelphia from 1838 to 1845. Besides some works of a theological character, he wrote a Greek Grammar (1838) and a Life of Rev. Alexander McLeod. He was for fifty-one years pastor of the First Reformed Church in Philadelphia, where he died on 14 October 1852, aged 79.
