= Hubert James Willey =

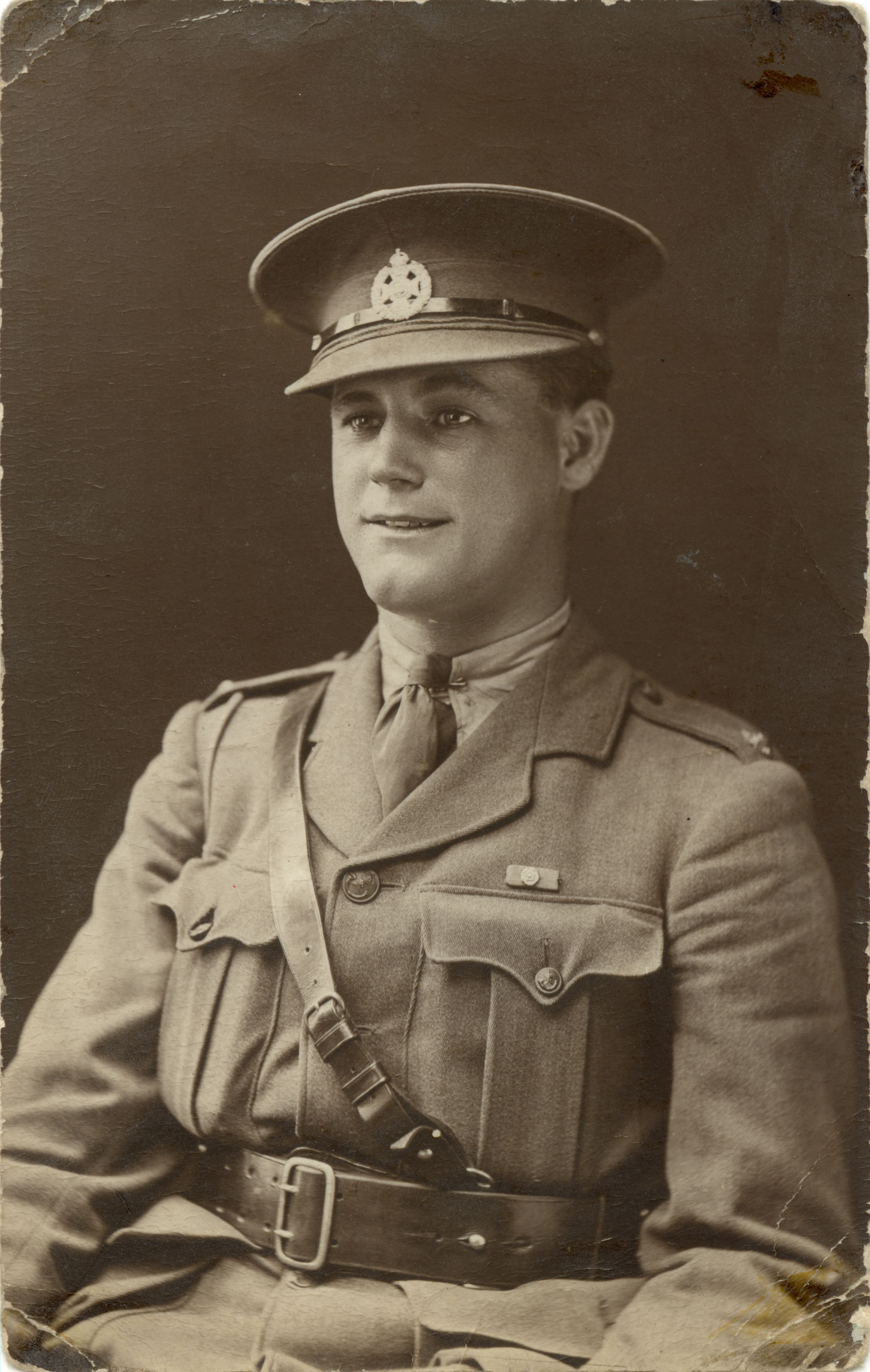
- 2/Lt H J Willey DCM The Rifle Brigade 1918
- Born: 11 July 1897; Dublin
- Died: 6 September 1948 (aged 51); London
- Spouse: Lillian May Brocklebank
- Military career
- Allegiance: United Kingdom
- Branch: Army
- Service years: 1914–1920
- Rank: Captain
- Unit: Rifle Brigade
- Conflicts: World War I
- Awards: Distinguished Conduct Medal & Bar, King's Commendation for Brave Conduct in Civil Defence
- Other work: Metropolitan Police

Hubert James Willey, DCM & Bar (11 July 1897 – 6 September 1948) was twice awarded the Distinguished Conduct Medal, then the second highest British gallantry award, for his service on the Western Front, during the First World War.

Born in Dublin, the second son of James Willey and Emily Maud Bannister, he joined the Rifle Brigade soon after the outbreak of war.

Willey was first awarded the DCM for an action in 1915, just over a month after his eighteenth birthday. He was serving with 9th Battalion The Rifle Brigade (part of 14th (Light) Division) in the Ypres Salient. As part of the British offensive at Loos a number of subsidiary attacks were organised. The 14th and 3rd Divisions were ordered to attack the strong German positions at Bellewaarde Farm, near Hooge, that overlooked the British line. These positions were held by several battalions of the Königlich Wörttembergisches Reserve-Infantrie-Regiment Nr 248. The Rifle Brigade's regimental history describes the attack as a 'costly fiasco'. Some battalions were hardly able to advance at all, others including 9/RB, ended up beyond their objectives. The battalion was then in a highly exposed and unsupported position, taking very heavy casualties, eventually losing all but four officers and one hundred and forty men. In his own account of the action, the commanding officer, Lt Col Villiers-Stuart, (Note: Brigadier-General W. D. Villiers-Stuart, CBE, DSO) gave the number of casualties as 1,116 of all ranks – a casualty rate of in excess of 85%.

Col Villiers-Stuart's diary relates:

A very young sergeant of D Coy, Will[e]y by name, had done specially well in the disastrous fight and was the first of the New Army to be made a CSM. (Note: Company Serjeant Major) I tried to get him and many others DCMs etc but the Corps Staff just crossed out all the 14th Division names as a matter of course. I may some day meet Keir and Lord Loch (Note: There was a history of hostility between Villiers-Stuart on the one side and the VI Corps commander General Sir John Keir (together with his Chief of Staff Lord Loch) on the other. In his diary Villiers-Stuart gives the background to this and describes some of the consequences. He compares him unfavourably to General Allenby who was also at odds with General Keir, and it was this latter enmity that was to eventually to result in Keir being sent home from France – an event commented on with some satisfaction by Villiers-Stuart.) unless they are dead – I hope I do.

Despite this, 3 DCMs were in fact awarded to 9/RB. The recipients were Willey together with Riflemen H. Hill and C.G. Roberts.

The citation published in the London Gazette of 16 November 1915 reads:

B/2391 Serjeant H.J.Willey, 9th Battalion, Rifle Brigade.

For conspicuous gallantry and ability on the 25th September, 1915, on Bellewaarde Ridge. During the action Serjeant Willey passed continually backwards and forwards trying to establish communication with the Battalion on his right, and later, when all his Officers had been killed, he rallied and organised the men of his own and other Companies, and captured a position in the German second line trenches, which he held against all counter attacks. During the day he was under incessant machine gun and shell fire. He also took six prisoners, and made them carry back the wounded of his party. He exhibited the greatest bravery and devotion to duty. (Note: Further accounts of 9/RB's attack at Hooge, including Willey's role in it, are given in Mumby and extensively Butterworth. Butterworth includes material from German accounts of the action.)

Such actions, including Willey's, were widely reported in the British press at the time as examples of how men in junior ranks had exercised initiative and leadership after their units had suffered high casualties amongst their officers – for example an article entitled Gallant Deeds Rewarded – Leaders in the Ranks published by The Buckingham Advertiser and North Bucks Free Press in November 1915.

During the battle of Delville Wood (part of the Battle of the Somme) in the summer of 1916, Willey suffered serious gun-shot wounds and was evacuated to the Huddersfield War Hospital at Royds Hall, Huddersfield. He remained there until at least mid-March 1917, as he was decorated with his D.C.M by the Commanding Officer of the hospital, Lt Col W.L.W. Marshall, R.A.M.C. on 16 March 1917.

Later in 1917 Willey returned to 9th Battalion of the Rifle Brigade, who were now again serving near Ypres. During the Third Battle of Ypres the 14th Division was ordered to attack German positions in two woods (known to the British Army as Glencorse Wood and Inverness Copse) on either side of the Ypres – Menin road, on 22 August 1917. Initially, the attack achieved most of its objectives but the attacking troops were then the subject of strong German counter-attacks. Held in reserve, 9/RB was then ordered, on 24 August, to relieve 8th Battalion King's Royal Rifle Corps (Note: referred to by Seymour by its traditional name of the 60th [Regiment of Foot]) and reinforce 6th Battalion Somerset Light Infantry. In his subsequent report, the commanding officer of 9/RB, Lt Col F.A.U. Pickering DSO related:

About this time, under orders from the OC 6th Bn K.O.Y.L.I., (Note: Officer Commanding the 6th battalion of the King's Own Yorkshire Light Infantry) my reserve platoons were sent to reinforce the 6th Bn. Somerset L.I.; one platoon on the right of the old front line and one platoon forward – well into the heart of Inverness Copse; this platoon, which went in over thirty-six strong, never left Inverness Copse though it was reduced to a serjeant and four men. This serjeant, Willey by name, collected a few stragglers of other battalions and held a post at the north end of the copse, but south of the Menin Road, until relieved.

Willey was awarded a bar to his DCM for this action, gazetted 22 October 1917

B/2391 Sjt H.J.Willey, Rif. Bde. (Stoke Newington).

For conspicuous gallantry and devotion to duty. He led his platoon through a heavy barrage to reinforce another unit which was being strongly counter-attacked. He rallied men who had been driven back and led them forward. Though counter-attacked again and losing heavily, he held on to his position, which was one of the greatest importance, until relieved. He set a splendid example to all.

Willey was commissioned as a Second Lieutenant in the Rifle Brigade in May 1918, and posted to the 13th Battalion of the Rifle Brigade (111th Brigade, 37th Division). In late August 1918 the battalion took part in the attack on Ablainzevelle and Favreuil, part of the Second Battle of Bapaume. Between 21 and 26 August, the brigade advanced some 8 miles, but during this time Willey was wounded – the overall battalion casualties in this action were 50 killed and 259 wounded.

Willey was promoted to Lieutenant in 1919 and again to A/Captain in 1920, leaving the Army that year.

Later in 1920 he joined the Metropolitan Police in London. On 9 December 1922 he married Lillian May Brocklebank and together they had a daughter and a son. During much of the 1920s and '30s, Willey served as a detective in Special Branch, earning several commendations for arrests in firearms and other cases. In 1921 Willey was serving in the short-lived Home Office Directorate of Intelligence under Sir Basil Thomson. In 1931 Willey arrested and gave evidence at the trial of William Shepherd who was subsequently convicted with George Allison of inciting mutiny in the Fleet at Portsmouth in the wake of the Invergordon Mutiny. During the Second World War Willey was awarded the King's Commendation for Brave Conduct for his actions during the London Blitz.

Willey died in 1948, while still serving with the Metropolitan Police, commanding the Wimbledon sub-division of V Division, in the rank of Sub-Divisional Inspector (a now abolished rank equivalent to the modern Superintendent). He was survived by his wife and children.
