= Andrew Brown (footballer, born 1865) =

Scottish footballer

Andrew Campbell Brown (2 September 1865 – 26 September 1904) was a Scottish footballer who played mainly as a centre half for St Mirren and Scotland.

One of the most important players in the early history of St Mirren, he was a Paisley native who initially played as a forward and had a good scoring rate in regional competitions such as the Renfrewshire Cup (success boosting their popularity locally), then also performed strongly later in his career after moving into a defensive role, as the Buddies were invited to take part in the inaugural seasons of the Scottish Football League from 1890. He died aged 39 from tuberculosis.
