= Jimmy Wyllie =

Scottish footballer

Personal information
- Date of birth: 15 October 1927
- Place of birth: Saltcoats, Scotland
- Date of death: 27 June 1992 (aged 64)
- Place of death: Southport, Merseyside, England
- Position: Inside forward

Youth career
- Riccarton Bluebell

Senior career*
Years	Team	Apps	(Gls)
1949–1950	Kilmarnock	1	(0)
1950	Southport	15	(1)
1950–1951	Wrexham	20	(4)
- Kidderminster Harriers
- * Club domestic league appearances and goals

James Wyllie (15 October 1927 – 27 June 1992) was a Scottish footballer who played in the Scottish league for Kilmarnock, and made English football league appearances with Southport and Wrexham.

== Career ==
Wyllie started out his professional career with Kilmarnock, however only made one appearance for the club in the 1949–1950 season.

He would then move to Southport on a free transfer. He made 15 appearances for the Merseyside-based club.

His performances earned him a move to Wrexham in December 1950, the club paying a four-figure fee for Wyllie. However, he would only make 20 appearances there before moving to Kidderminster Harriers.

== Death ==
Wyllie died in Southport on 27 June 1992.
