= Edward McBain =

Scottish footballer

Edward McBain was a Scottish footballer, who played for St Mirren and Scotland.
