= Ian Martin Wylie =

British doctor (born 1955)

Ian Martin Wylie FRSM
- Born: 22 October 1955
- Education: Bedford Modern School
- Alma mater: St Peter's College, Oxford
- Known for: Chief Executive of the Royal College of Obstetricians and Gynaecologists

Ian Martin Wylie FRSM (born 22 October 1955) is the former Chief Executive of the Royal College of Obstetricians and Gynaecologists, holding this position from 2010 to 2019. He was previously a director of the King's Fund, Chief Executive of the British Dental Association between 2001 and 2005, an Associate Professor in the Faculty of Social Science at the Chinese University of Hong Kong, head of clinical planning for the Hospital Authority in Hong Kong and Chief Executive of TreeHouse, a national charity for autism education.

In addition to his executive positions, Wylie is an authority on Samuel Taylor Coleridge with particular reference to the impact of natural philosophy on the poet's work, explored by Wylie in his book Young Coleridge and the Philosophers of Nature. He has also served as chairman of the Thames Vale Youth Orchestra (2003–05) and the Autism Educational Trust (2007–08). He has been a trustee of the Crouch End Festival Chorus (2009–10) and has been trustee of the Faculty of Medical Leadership and Management since 2013.

== Early life ==
Ian Martin Wylie was born on 22 October 1955, the son of Charles Ronald Wylie and Margaret (née Catanach). He was educated at Bedford Modern School and St Peter's College, Oxford (MA Hons). In 1985 Wylie earned a doctorate in English Literature from the University of Oxford.

== Career ==
Wylie began his career in the NHS, specialising in primary care development and hospital organisation in inner London. During the 1990s he was involved in the development of GP Fundholding and NHS Commissioning. Between 1994 and 2000, he served as a Director of the King's Fund.

In 2001, Wylie was appointed Chief Executive of the British Dental Association, a position he held until 2005. In 2006 he was made an Associate Professor in the Faculty of Social Science at the Chinese University of Hong Kong and between 2009 and 2010 he was head of clinical planning for the Hospital Authority in Hong Kong. In Hong Kong he was responsible for developing clinical service strategies for mental health, elderly people, and cardiac services.

In 2010 Wylie was appointed Chief Executive of the Royal College of Obstetricians and Gynaecologists.

== Personal life ==
Wylie married Siân Meryl Griffiths in 1987. He has one son by Griffiths and two step daughters. His recreations are writing, opera and family.

Wylie has a doctorate in English Literature from the University of Oxford and is an authority on Samuel Taylor Coleridge with particular reference to the impact of natural philosophy on the poet's work; this was explored by Wylie in his book, Young Coleridge and the Philosophers of Nature. Wylie has served as chairman of the Thames Vale Youth Orchestra (2003–05) and the Autism Educational Trust (2007–08). He has been a trustee of the Crouch End Festival Chorus (2009–10) and of the Faculty of Medical Leadership and Management since 2013.

Wylie is a member of the Garrick.

== Publications ==
- Patient Power by Ian Wylie and Sarah Harvey. Published by Simon & Schuster, New York, 1999
- Young Coleridge and the Philosophers of Nature. Published by Oxford University Press, London and New York, 1989
- The influence of natural philosophy on the early thought of Coleridge, with particular reference to Religious musings. Published by the University of Oxford, 1984
