= Wiley =

Wiley may refer to:

== Locations ==
- Wiley, Colorado, a U.S. town
- Wiley, Georgia, a U.S. unincorporated community
- Wiley, Pleasants County, West Virginia, U.S.
- Wiley-Kaserne, a district of the city of Neu-Ulm, Germany

== People ==
- Wiley (musician), British grime MC, rapper, and producer

== Other uses ==
- Wiley (publisher), a publishing company also known as John Wiley & Sons
  - Wiley-Blackwell, an imprint of the publisher
- Wiley College, Texas, U.S.
- Wiley Rein, a U.S. law firm
- USS Wiley (DD-597), a U.S. warship

== See also ==
- Whiley
- Wile E. Coyote and the Road Runner; the cartoon coyote character's name and "Wily" are homophones
- Willey (disambiguation)
- Wily (disambiguation)
- Wyle (disambiguation)
- Wylie (disambiguation)
- Wyllie
- Wyly
- Wylye (disambiguation)
