= Charles Creagh-Osborne =

British Army general (1823–1892)

Lieutenant-General Charles Creagh-Osborne CB
- Born: 20 December 1823
- Died: 17 August 1892 (aged 68)
- Military career
- Allegiance: United Kingdom
- Branch: British Army
- Rank: Lieutenant-General
- Commands: Staff College, Sandhurst
- Conflicts: Indian Mutiny
- Awards: Companion of the Order of the Bath

Lieutenant-General Charles Osborne Creagh-Osborne CB (20 December 1823 – 17 August 1892) was a British Army officer who became Commandant of the Staff College, Sandhurst.

== Military career ==
Creagh-Osborne was commissioned as an ensign into the 6th Regiment of Foot in 1841. He served with the Scinde Camel Corps during Sir Charles Napier's campaign in India in 1842. He also took part in the response to Indian Mutiny of 1857 being present at the assault on Jagdispur. He became Superintendent of Garrison Instructors in India in 1873 and Commandant of the Staff College, Sandhurst in 1878. There is a memorial to him in Boldre Churchyard.

== Family ==
In 1866 he married Harriet Frances Crozier; they had three sons and three daughters.

Military offices
| Preceded by Archibald Alison | Commandant of the Staff College, Sandhurst; 1878–1885 | Succeeded by Edward Clive |
