= Wylie School =

- U.S. National Register of Historic Places
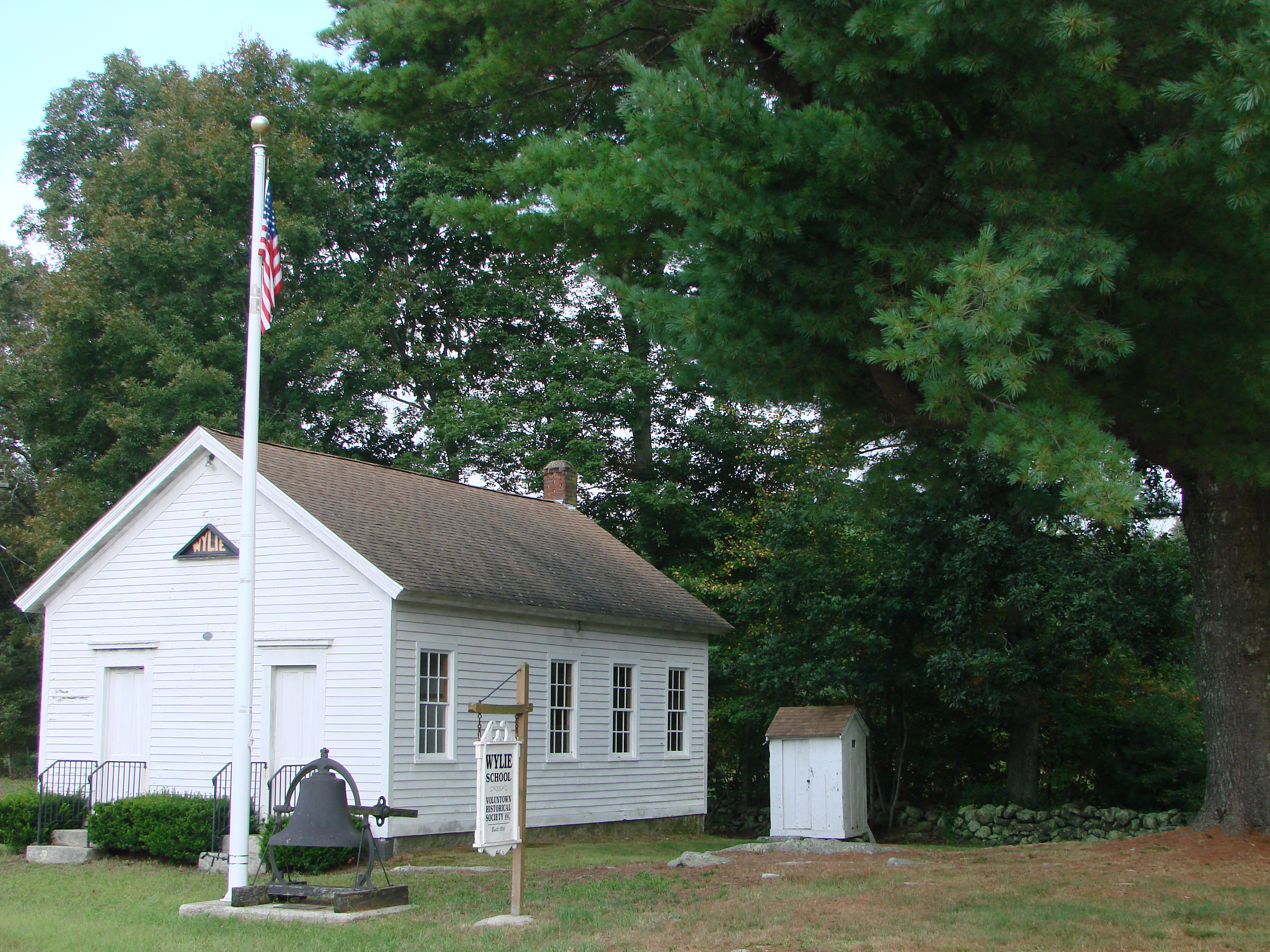

- Location within Connecticut Location within the United States
- Location: Junction of Ekonk Hill and Wylie School Roads, Voluntown, Connecticut
- Coordinates: 41°36′34″N 71°50′38″W
- Area: 0.3 acres (0.12 ha)
- Built: 1856
- NRHP reference No.: 91001742
- Added to NRHP: December 19, 1991

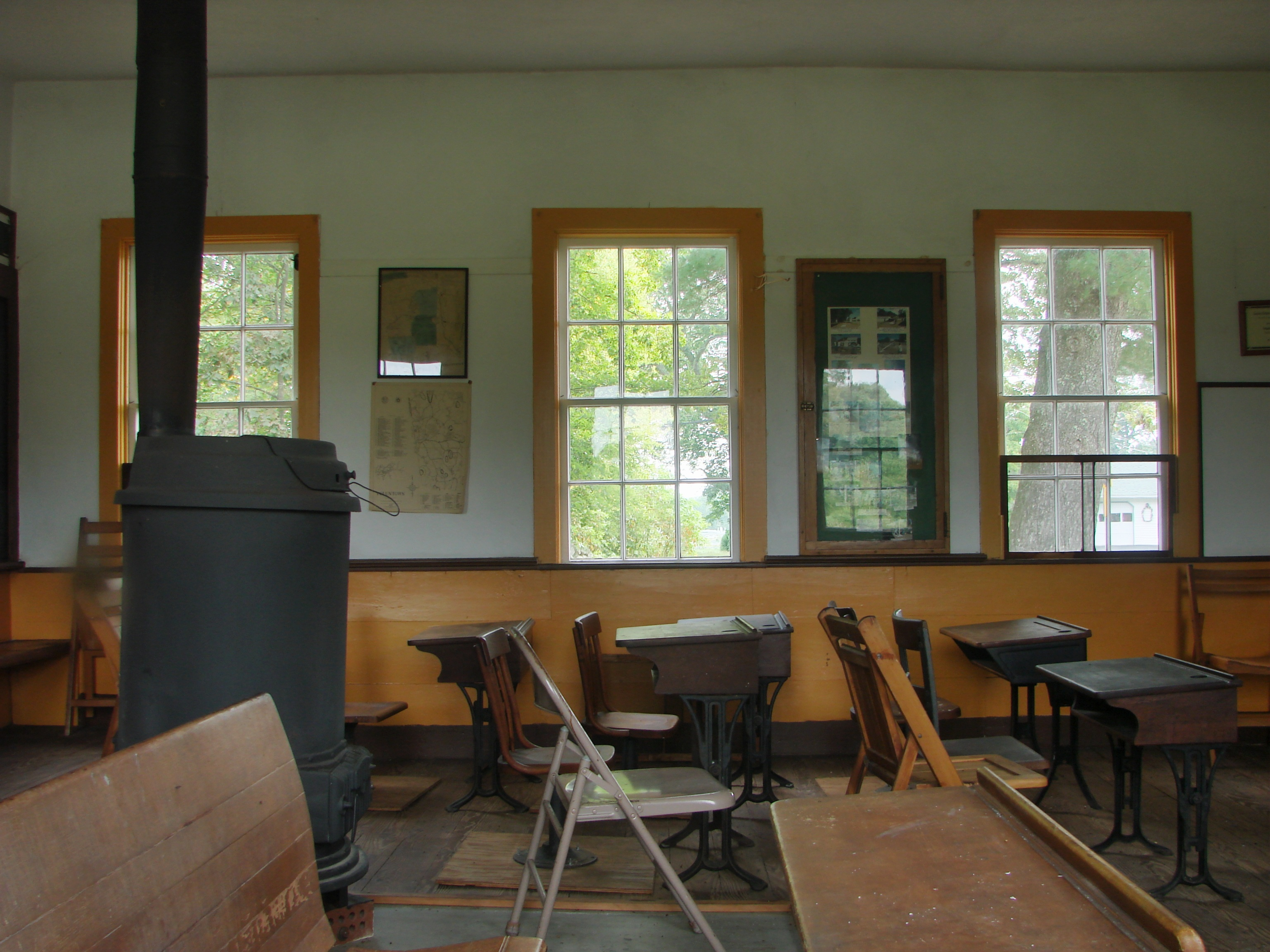
Interior

The Wylie School is a historic school building at Ekonk Hill Road and Wylie School Road in Voluntown, Connecticut.Built in 1856, this school was used by the town until 1939, and is its only surviving district school building. It is now used as a meeting space and museum by the local historical society. The building was listed on the National Register of Historic Places on December 19, 1991.

== Description and history ==
The Wylie School is located in a rural setting, at the northern corner of Ekonk Hill Road (Connecticut Route 49) and Sandhill Road. It is a small single-story wood-frame structure with a gable roof and clapboarded exterior. Its main facade has two matching entrances, framed by simple molding and topped by a cornice. The interior has two vestibules with closets between them, leading into a single large schoolroom with a raised section at the back. The building's utilitarian appearance, which is largely devoid of period stylistic embellishments, was probably more typical of Connecticut's 19th-century district schools. The interior has been furnished to give the appearance it might have had in the 19th century, although the fixtures are not original. The property includes a period privy.

The school was built around 1855, on land given for the purpose by Henry Wylie, a local farmer. The school served the northern part of Voluntown until its closure at the end of the school year in 1939. From 1909, its teacher was Margaret Tanner, a teacher who served forty years in the school system, teaching several generations of children.

== See also ==
- National Register of Historic Places listings in New London County, Connecticut
