= Sarah Wylie =

Canadian writer of young adult novels (born 1989)

- Born: 1989 (age 36–37)
- Writing career
- Genre: Young-adult literature
- Notable awards: TriState Young Adult Review Committee Books of Note 2013
- Website: www.sarahwyliebooks.com

Sarah Wylie (born 1989) is a Canadian writer of young adult novels. Her first novel, All These Lives, was published in 2012.

== Biography ==
Sarah Wylie lived in Africa and Australia as a child. She graduated from college in 2011 with a degree in Neuroscience. She currently resides in Alberta, Canada.

Wylie's debut novel, All These Lives (Farrar, Straus and Giroux (BYR); June 5, 2012), received starred reviews from The Bulletin of the Center for Children's Books and Library Media Connection, which calls it "a truly original and refreshing novel" with "deft prose [that] makes each page a treasure to read." Canadian Children's Book News, in a glowing review, calls it "a beautifully written and powerful novel" that "sensitively explores how a family copes with a serious illness." In positive reviews, Kirkus and School Library Journal write, respectively, that All These Lives is "a tight, even gripping chronicle of the way one girl grapples with domestic catastrophe" that "will speak to teens who may be going through similar tough family situations." Her next novel, another stand-alone contemporary young adult novel, will be published in 2014.

== Recognition ==
All These Lives was a TriState Young Adult Review Committee Books of Note 2013.
