= L. D. Wyly =

Lemuel David Wyly, Jr. (August 9, 1916 – September 5, 2004) was an American physicist and professor of nuclear physics at the Georgia Institute of Technology. He worked on important nuclear physics experiments at the Oak Ridge National Laboratory. He did his graduate studies from UNC Chapel Hill and PhD from Yale University. His work includes a number of notable research papers on nuclear physics and a book written with two co-authors. His famous students include Ed V. Hungerford III.

Wyly retired from Georgia Tech and lived in Atlanta till his death, leaving his wife Estelle Estelle Bruggemann Wyly and two children. Wyly died on September 5, 2004, at the age of 88. His wife died in 2009.
