= Chandos Wren-Hoskyns =

English landowner and agricultural writer

Chandos Wren-Hoskyns BA, JP, DL (15 February 1812 – 28 November 1876) was an English landowner, agriculturist, politician and author.

== Family ==
Born Chandos Hoskyns, as the second son of Sir Hungerford Hoskyns, 7th Baronet of Harewood Park, Herefordshire, he was descended from the poet John Hoskins. In 1837 he married Theodosia Wren – descended from Christopher Wren and a daughter and heiress of Christopher Roberts Wren of Wroxall Abbey, Warwickshire – and changed his surname to Wren-Hoskyns. They had a daughter, Catherine. After his first wife's death in 1842, he married in 1846 Anna Fane, daughter of Charles Milner Ricketts. They had a son and two daughters.

== Public life ==
Educated at Shrewsbury, followed by Balliol College, Oxford, Wren-Hoskyns was called to the Bar at Inner Temple in 1838. He served as High Sheriff of Warwickshire in 1855 and was appointed Deputy Lieutenant of the county in 1860. He was a Member of Parliament (MP) for Hereford from 1869 to 1874, but spoke little apart from a few remarks on agriculture.

== Writings ==
As an author, Wren-Hoskyns wrote frequently for the Agricultural Gazette from its establishment in 1844, and for the Journal of the Royal Agricultural Society of England in 1855–1858. Writing in the preface to A Short Enquiry into the History of Agriculture in Ancient Medieval and Modern Times (1849), he noted pertinently: "English publishers say, despondingly, that agriculturists are not a reading class. What have they ever had to make them so?'

Not all his views are generally shared in the 21st century: he described hedgerows as "hideous and useless strongholds of roots, weeds, birds and vermin." His main interest latterly was reform of land tenure, specifically, obstacles to the purchase and sale of land, such as primogeniture and entail.

== Bibliography ==
Wren-Hoskyns's works include:

- A Short Inquiry into the History of Agriculture in Mediæval and Modern Times (1849)
- Talpa or the Chronicles of a Clay Farm. An Agricultural Fragment (1852)
- Agricultural Statistics (1857)
- Occasional Essays (1866)
- Land in England, Land in Ireland, and Land in other Lands (1869)
- The Land Laws of England: Systems of Land Tenure in Various Countries (1870)
- A Catechism on the English Land System (1873)

Parliament of the United Kingdom
| Preceded by George Clive; John Wyllie | Member of Parliament for Hereford with Edward Clive 1869–1871; George Arbuthnot 1871–1874; 1869–1874 | Succeeded by Evan Pateshall; George Clive |
Honorary titles
| Preceded by William Charles Alston | High Sheriff of Warwickshire; 1855 | Succeeded by Sir Peter Van Notten-Pole |
