= Rod Wylie =

Rodney Wylie OBE (C) is an accountant and Queensland corporate figure, who over the last 50 years has held the position of either company director or chairman of several Queensland companies, including national and international organisations. Some of these include Peat Marwick Mitchell, the Institute of Chartered Accountants, QUF Industries (later Pauls), Theiss, Leightons, AMP Society, Queensland Alumina, Markwell Fisheries, Australian United Foods Pioneer Sugar Mills, the Bank of Queensland; and several not-for-profit groups.

He held leadership positions such as inaugural Chairman of the Queensland Competition Authority; Chairman of the Brisbane Cricket Ground Trust; Queensland Enterprise Group; the Red Shield Appeal; Institute of Company Directors and President of the Institute of Public Affairs (Queensland).

Wylie was appointed an Officer of the British Empire - (Civil Division) for "services to the accountancy profession and the community" in the 1988 New Year Honours. In 2017 he was inducted into the Queensland Business Leaders Hall of Fame.

Wylie is the father of businessman John Wylie.
