= L. G. Tang =

Linguang Tang is a Professor of Physics at the School of Science at the Hampton University, Hampton, Virginia, holding a joint position as faculty at Hampton and as Staff Scientist at the Thomas Jefferson National Accelerator Facility. He completed his B.A. in 1977 from Beijing Polytechnic University, Beijing, China, M.S. 1981, from the Institute of High Energy Physics, the Chinese Academy of Science and Technology, Beijing, China, and PhD in 1987, from the University of Houston, Houston, TX, with Prof. Ed V. Hungerford III. His research group is one of the leading groups in the nation in the area of experimental Hypernuclear physics, with mostly retaining leadership (Spokesperson/co-Spokesperson) roles on virtually all hypernuclear experiments (eg E89-009, E01-011, E02-017, E05-115/E08-002) at the Hall C or (E08-012/PR10-001) to be conducted in Hall A at the CEBAF accelerator.

== Selected publications ==
- L. Tang, New Era: Study Light Hypernuclei via Two Body Decay Pion Spectroscopy using CEBAF Beam, proceedings of the Sendai International Symposium, Strangeness in Nuclear and Hadronic Systems (SENDAI08), Sendai, Japan, December 14–18, 2008, World Scientific, Edited by K. Maeda, S.N. Nakamura, H. Tamura and O. Hashimoto, Page 346.
- L. Tang, et al., The HKS experiment on L-hypernuclear spectroscopy via electroproduction at Jlab, Nuclear Physics A, Vol. 790, 9 June 15, 2007, Page 679c-682c.
- M. Ukai, et al., Observation of the 7MeV excited spin-flip and non-spin-flip partners in 16LO by g-ray spectroscopy, The European Physical Journal A - Hadrons and Nuclei, Vol. 33, No. 3, 247-250 (2007)
- L. Yuan, et al., Hypernuclear spectroscopy using the (e,e'K+) reaction, Phys. Rev. C, Vol. 73, 044607 (2006)
- M. Ukai, et al., Cascade g decay in the 7LLi hypernucleus, Phys. Rev. C, Vol. 73, 012501(R), 2006
- L. Tang, High precision spectroscopy of L-hypernuclei beyond p-shell using electromagnetic probes at JLAB, selected papers presented at the 2nd Intgernational Conference on Nuclear and Particle Physics with CEBAF at Jefferson Lab, Dubrovnik, Croatia, 26–31 May 2003, edited by, published by the Croatian Physics Society, special issue: Fizika B (Zagreb) Volume 13, No. 1, 2004
- J. Sasao, et al. 7LLi ground-state spin determined by the yield of ? rays subsequent to weak decay, Phys. Lett. B579 (2004) 258-264
- T. Miyoshi, et al. High Resolution Spectroscopy of the 12LB Hpernucleus Produced by the (e,e'K+) Reaction, Phys. Rev. Lett. Vol.90 , No.23, 232502, 2003
- L. Tang, First Experiment to Produce Λ-hypernuclei Using Electron Beam At JLAB, World Scientific, Modern Physics Letters A, Vol. 18, Nos. 2-6 (2003) 112-115
- T. Miyoshi, et al., A silicon strip detector used as a high rate focal plane sensor for electrons in a magnetic spectrometer, Nucl. Instr. and Meth., A496 (2003) 362-372
- J.K. Ahn, et al., Production of ΛΛ4H Hypernuclei, Phys. Rev. Lett. Vol.87, No.13 (2001).
- S. Ajimura, et al., Observation of Spin-orbit Splitting in L Single-particle States, Phys. Rev. Lett. Vol.86, No.19 (2001)4255-4258
