= Wiley, Pleasants County, West Virginia =

Wiley
- Unincorporated community
- Location within the state of West Virginia Wiley (the United States)
- Coordinates: 39°19′49″N 81°7′31″W
- Country: United States
- State: West Virginia
- County: Pleasants
- Elevation: 856 ft (261 m)
- Time zone: UTC-5 (Eastern (EST))
  - Summer (DST): UTC-4 (EDT)
- GNIS ID: 1555986

Wiley is an unincorporated community in Pleasants County, West Virginia, United States.
