= Lingguang Temple (Meizhou) =

Buddhist temple in Guangdong, China

- 灵光寺
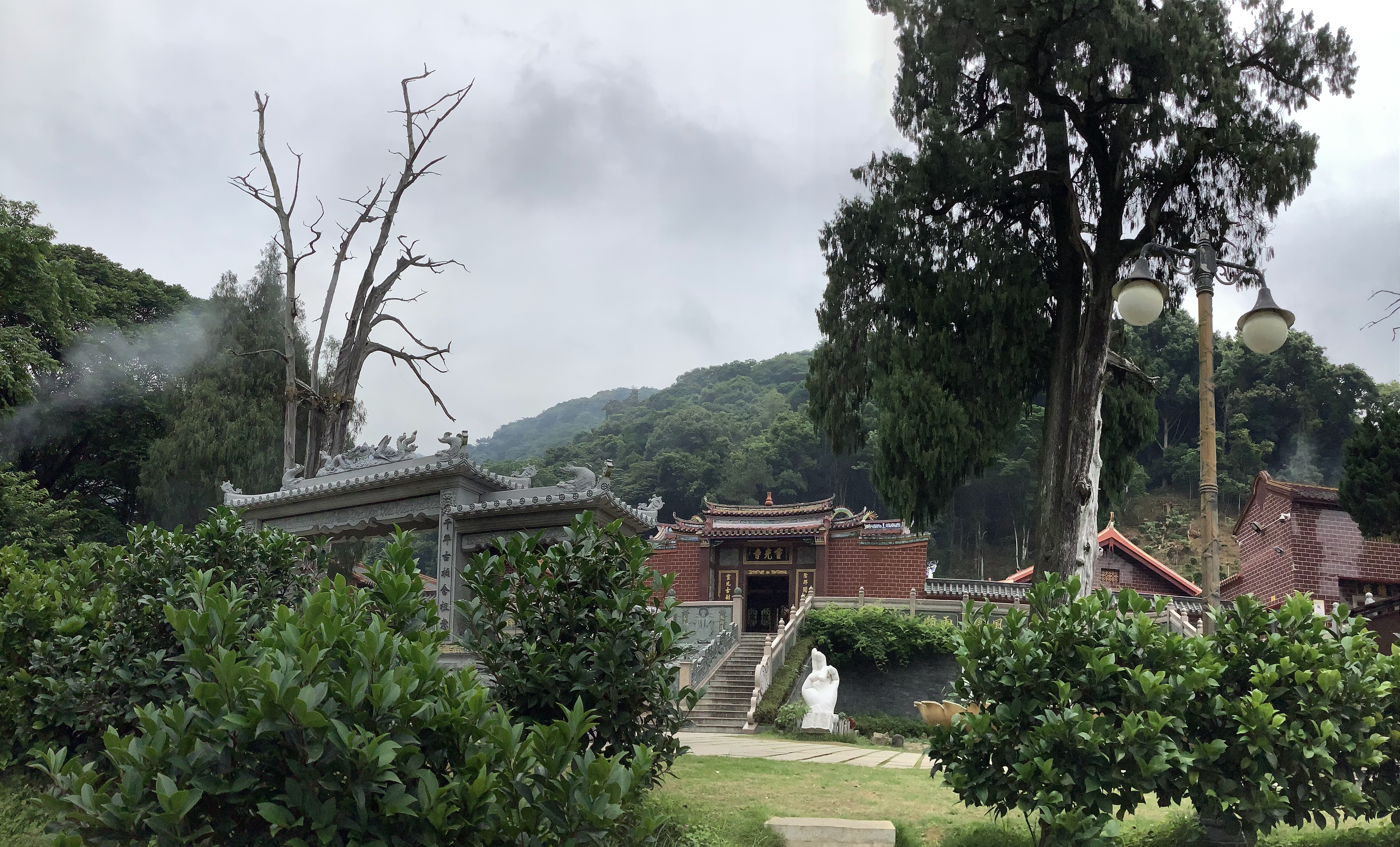

- Location within Guangdong

Religion
- Affiliation: Buddhism
- Deity: Chan Buddhism

Location
- Location: Meixian District, Meizhou, Guangdong
- Country: China
- Coordinates: 24°24′10″N 116°24′06″E

Architecture
- Style: Chinese architecture
- Founder: Pan Liaoquan (潘了拳)
- Established: 860–874
- Completed: 1385 (reconstruction)
- Materials: Brick and wood

Lingguang Temple (simplified Chinese: 灵光寺; traditional Chinese: 靈光寺; pinyin: Língguāng Sì; lit. 'Temple of Divine Light') is a Buddhist temple located in Meixian District of Meizhou, Guangdong, China.

== History ==
The temple traces its origins to the former "Shengshou Temple" (圣寿寺), founded by master Pan Liaoquan (潘了拳) in the Xiantong period (860–874) of the Tang dynasty (618–907), and would later become "Lingguang Temple" in 1385 during the reign of Hongwu Emperor (1368–1398) at the dawn of Ming dynasty (1368–1644).

== Architecture ==
The complex include the following halls: Mahavira Hall, Hall of Four Heavenly Kings (Shanmen), Zhutian Hall (诸天殿), Bell tower, Drum tower, Hall of Guru, Dharma Hall, Meditation Hall, Dining Room, etc.

=== Hall of Four Heavenly Kings ===
Maitreya is enshrined in the Hall of Four Heavenly Kings and at the back of his statue is a statue of Skanda. Statues of Four Heavenly Kings are enshrined in the left and right sides.

=== Mahavira Hall ===
The Mahavira Hall is 14.52 metres (47.6 ft) wide and 14.75 metres (48.4 ft) deep with the architectural style of the Tang dynasty. Statue of Pan Liaoquan (潘了拳) is enshrined in front of the hall. In the middle are statues of Thousand Armed and Eyed Guanyin, Ksitigarbha and Mulian. Statue of Guanyin is placed at the back of the hall.

=== Zhutian Hall ===
The Zhutian Hall (诸天殿) enshrining the Twenty-four Heavenlies

== National Treasure ==
The Bell tower houses a bronze bell which was cast in 1485, in the reign of Chenghua Emperor of the Ming dynasty weighing 1,000 kilograms (2,200 lb). It is 1.8 metres (5 ft 11 in) high and its bore is 1.5 metres (4 ft 11 in). A Chinese couple are carved in the outside.
