= Tom Wylie (footballer, born 1907) =

Scottish footballer

Personal information
- Full name: Thomas Wylie
- Date of birth: 10 November 1907
- Place of birth: Linwood, Scotland
- Height: 5 ft 7 in (1.70 m)
- Position: Forward

Senior career*
Years	Team	Apps	(Gls)
1930–1931	Benburb		
1931–1936	Motherwell	30	(19)
1936–1937	Sunderland	7	(3)
1937–1938	Queen of the South	7	(1)
1938–1939	Peebles Rovers		
- * Club domestic league appearances and goals

Thomas Wylie (born 10 November 1907, date of death unknown) was a Scottish professional footballer who played as a forward in the English Football League for Sunderland, and in the Scottish Football League for Motherwell and Queen of the South.
