= David Wylie (author) =

American activist (born 1929)

David A. Wylie (born November 30, 1929) is an American writer, attorney, and former local politician in Boston, Massachusetts.

== Career ==
Wylie served as an officer in the United States Coast Guard at the Houston Port Security Station. Later, he worked on several political campaigns, once as an advance man in a presidential run. He went on to become a public servant serving the city of Cambridge, Massachusetts for fourteen years, first on the Cambridge School Committee and eventually on City Council. As a city councilor, Wylie brought to light the inadequacy of the evacuation plan recommended by the Commonwealth of Massachusetts should Cambridge become a target of nuclear attack. This resulted in hearings on the topic and eventually the publication of a pamphlet titled "Cambridge and nuclear weapons: Is there a place to hide?" The pamphlet was well received by people in Cambridge and communities across the state and country requested copies leading to a reprint being ordered. Wylie was also instrumental in the establishment of the Cambridge Peace Commission through a city ordinance. His book is the product of these experiences plus decades of research and advocacy on the topics of nuclear disarmament, citizen activism, and global democracy. He has contributed to Massachusetts newspapers like as the Cambridge Chronicle.

In his book, City, Save Thyself! - Nuclear Terror and the Urban Ballot (Trueblood Publishing, 2009), Wylie calls on the citizenry to act locally to build the global democracy needed to keep international peace. He says the nuclear threat is difficult to make personal because most people feel that they are unable to effect change individually. According to Wylie, tremendous power lies in our cities and towns; the trick is being heard. The book was a finalist in the 2010 Next Generation Indie Book Awards in the categories of Current Events and Social Change.

Former US Senator Bill Bradley said of the book "Wylie offers a powerful message: If you want to fix America, begin at the local level, but think globally and in the process revive our democracy."

== See also ==
- List of peace activists
