= Alex Wylie (cricketer) =

English cricketer (born 1973)

Personal information
- Born: 20 February 1973 (age 53); Tamworth, Staffordshire
- Batting: Left-handed
- Bowling: Right arm fast

Career statistics
Competition	First-class
Matches	3
Runs scored	14
Batting average	3.50
100s/50s	0/0
Top score	7
Balls bowled	342
Wickets	2
Bowling average	108.00
5 wickets in innings	0
10 wickets in match	0
Best bowling	1/50
Catches/stumpings	0/–
- Source: CricketArchive, 3 May 2022

Alex Wylie (born 20 February 1973) is a former English cricketer, who played first-class cricket for Worcestershire in the 1990s. He was born in Tamworth.

Wylie made three first-class appearances before he became injured. He picked up two wickets in his brief first-team career: the first, on his debut against Nottinghamshire in 1993 having Bruce French dismissed hit wicket. Two years later he had Middlesex's John Emburey caught by David Leatherdale.

He had played for Worcestershire's Second XI as early as 1989, and joined the staff in 1991. However, injury blighted his chances and it was not until 1993 that a feature in The Guardian listed him as Worcestershire's "one to watch", noting his "extremely rapid" bowling. Wylie had a good career based on the other classes of cricket he played, however his extreme potential to be one of the best English bowlers was cut short due to injury.

Wylie also played club cricket for Droitwich Spa in the Midland Combined Counties League.
