= John Wylie (footballer, born 1936) =

English footballer

Personal information
- Full name: John Edward Wylie
- Date of birth: 26 September 1936
- Place of birth: Newcastle upon Tyne, England
- Date of death: 18 September 2013 (aged 76)
- Place of death: Doncaster, England
- Position: Right half

Youth career
- Newcastle Boys

Senior career*
Years	Team	Apps	(Gls)
1954–1957	Huddersfield Town	0	(0)
1957–1962	Preston North End	91	(1)
1962–1964	Stockport County	69	(2)
1964–1968	Doncaster Rovers	124	(2)
1968–19??	Scarborough		
- * Club domestic league appearances and goals

John Edward Wylie (26 September 1936 – 18 September 2013) was a footballer who played as a right half for Preston North End, Stockport County, and Doncaster Rovers.

== Senior club career ==
=== Huddersfield Town ===
Joining Division One side Huddersfield Town from school, Wylie never made a first team appearance in his three seasons there.

=== Preston North End ===
Division One, Preston North End signed him in May 1957 on a free transfer. On Boxing Day 1960 he captained the team. He went on to make 110 League and cup appearances for the club.

=== Stockport County ===
He was signed by Fourth Division team Stockport County for £3,500 in November 1962.

=== Doncaster Rovers ===
Wylie was signed by fellow Fourth Division side Doncaster Rovers in August 1964, his debut being in a 1–0 home victory against Aldershot on 29 August 1964. He would have started in the first two games of the season but for serving a suspension from being sent off for striking an opponent in the previous season. He went on to play in every league and cup game for the remainder of that season and the following season, one small blight with him being substituted against Barnsley in May 1966. He missed some games the following season, with him getting to an unbroken sequence of 101 League appearances, and 118 in total including the FA and League Cup games.

He was ever present in the 1965–66 Fourth Division title winning side.

His last game for Rovers was in September 1967 against Wrexham where he was substituted by Graham Ricketts. After the 1967–68 season at Doncaster, he moved to play for Scarborough.

== Honours ==
Doncaster Rovers

Fourth Division

- Winner 1965–66
