= Andrew Wyllie (engineer) =

Scottish civil engineer

Andrew Wyllie CBE FREng (born December 1962) is a Scottish civil engineer who was chief executive of the UK-based Costain Group from 2005 until stepping down on 7 May 2019. In November 2018, he became the 154th president of the Institution of Civil Engineers.

== Career ==
Wyllie grew up in Scotland, being educated at Dunfermline High School and the University of Strathclyde, graduating in 1984 with a BSc in civil engineering.

Wyllie began his construction career as a graduate engineer at Taylor Woodrow in 1984, working in Saudi Arabia, Ghana and the Falkland Islands, and gained an MBA from the London Business School in 1993. After a three-year spell in business development at Taylor Woodrow, he became operations director of the firm's Africa division in 1996. In 1999, he was appointed a director of Taylor Woodrow Construction, of which he became managing director, aged 38, in July 2001. After four years in that role, he was appointed chief executive of the Costain Group in 2005, taking office in early 2006.

He helped stabilise the then financially struggling business, which finished 2006 by issuing profits warnings and cancelling dividends. It finished 2006 with a pre-tax loss of £61.7m, by which time Wyllie was refocussing Costain on larger clients and pushing through a rights issue in 2007. In March 2019, Costain announced Wyllie would be stepping down as CEO on 7 May 2019, to be succeeded by Alex Vaughan.

In December 2017 it was confirmed Wyllie would succeed Robert Mair as president of the Institution of Civil Engineers, and in November 2018, he became the ICE's 154th president.

A fellow of the ICE, Wyllie is also a fellow of the Royal Academy of Engineering (elected 2009), the Institute of Directors and the British-American Project. He is a member of the Infrastructure Board of the Confederation of British Industry and a companion of the Chartered Management Institute.

From April 2009 to March 2017 Wyllie was a non-executive director of Scottish Water, and, since September 2017 has been a non-executive director of Yorkshire Water.

== Honours ==
Wyllie was appointed a CBE for services to construction and engineering in the 2015 New Year Honours.

Professional and academic associations
Preceded by Robert Mair, Baron Mair	President of the Institution of Civil Engineers; November 2018 – November 2019	Succeeded by Paul Sheffield
