= Lingguang Temple (Beijing) =

Buddhist temple in Beijing, China

- 灵光寺
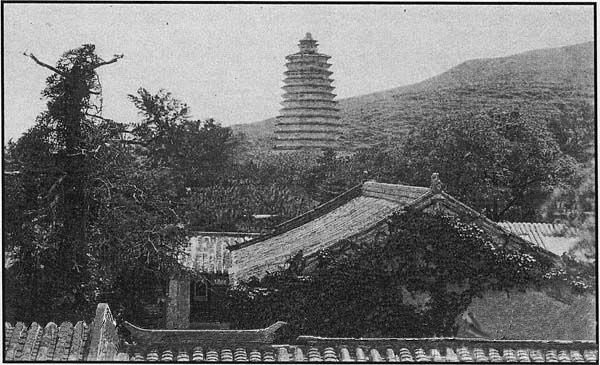
- Lingguang Temple before 1900.

- Location within Beijing

Religion
- Affiliation: Buddhism
- Leadership: Shi Changzang (释常藏); Shi Shenghui (释圣辉)

Location
- Location: Shijingshan District, Beijing
- Country: China
- Interactive map of Lingguang Temple
- Coordinates: 39°57′47″N 116°11′24″E

Architecture
- Style: Chinese architecture
- Established: 766–779

Lingguang Temple (simplified Chinese: 灵光寺; traditional Chinese: 靈光寺; pinyin: Língguāng Sì; lit. 'Temple of Divine Light') is a Buddhist temple located on the east hillside of Mount Cuiwei (翠微山), in the Shijingshan District of Beijing. The temple is renowned for its collection of the tooth relic of the Buddha.

== History ==
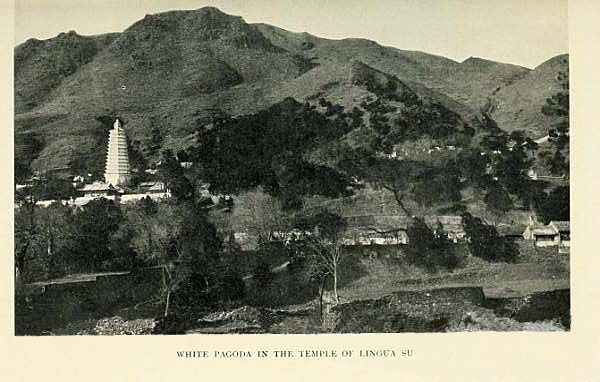
Zhaoxian Pagoda at Lingguang Temple before 1900.

=== Tang dynasty ===
The temple was originally built between 766 and 779 in the Dali period (766–779) of the Tang dynasty (618–907), and was initially called "Longquan Temple" (龙泉寺).

=== Liao dynasty ===
In 1071, in the Xianyong era (1065–1074) of the Liao dynasty (907–1211), Lady Zheng, the mother of the then prime minister Yelü Renxian, elected the Zhaoxian Pagoda to worship the tooth relic of the Buddha.

=== Jin dynasty ===
Lingguang Temple was refurbished in 1162, in the 2nd year of the Dading period (1161–1189) of the Jin dynasty (1115–1234), and was renamed "Jueshan Temple" (觉山寺).

=== Ming dynasty ===
The temple was largely expanded in the reign of Emperor Yingzong (1457–1464) of the Ming dynasty (1368–1644), and the name was changed into "Lingguang Temple" (灵光寺), which is still in use now.

=== Qing dynasty ===
Lingguang Temple was badly damaged in 1900 during the invasion of China by the Eight-Nation Alliance. While monk Sheng'an (圣安) supervised the reconstruction of the temple, he founded a stone box in the ruins which preserved the tooth relic of the Buddha.

=== Republic of China ===
The modern temple was rebuilt in the 1920s.

=== People's Republic of China ===
After the establishment of the Communist State in 1956, the Beijing Municipal Government listed the temple as among the first batch of the municipal cultural preservation unit.

In 1955, the tooth relic of the Buddha was transferred to Guangji Temple.

Construction of the Stupa of the tooth relic of the Buddha commenced in 1959 and was completed in 1964.

During the ten-year Cultural Revolution, the religious activities were discontinued.

Lingguang Temple was designated as a National Key Buddhist Temple in Han Chinese Area by the State Council of China in 1983.

== Architecture ==
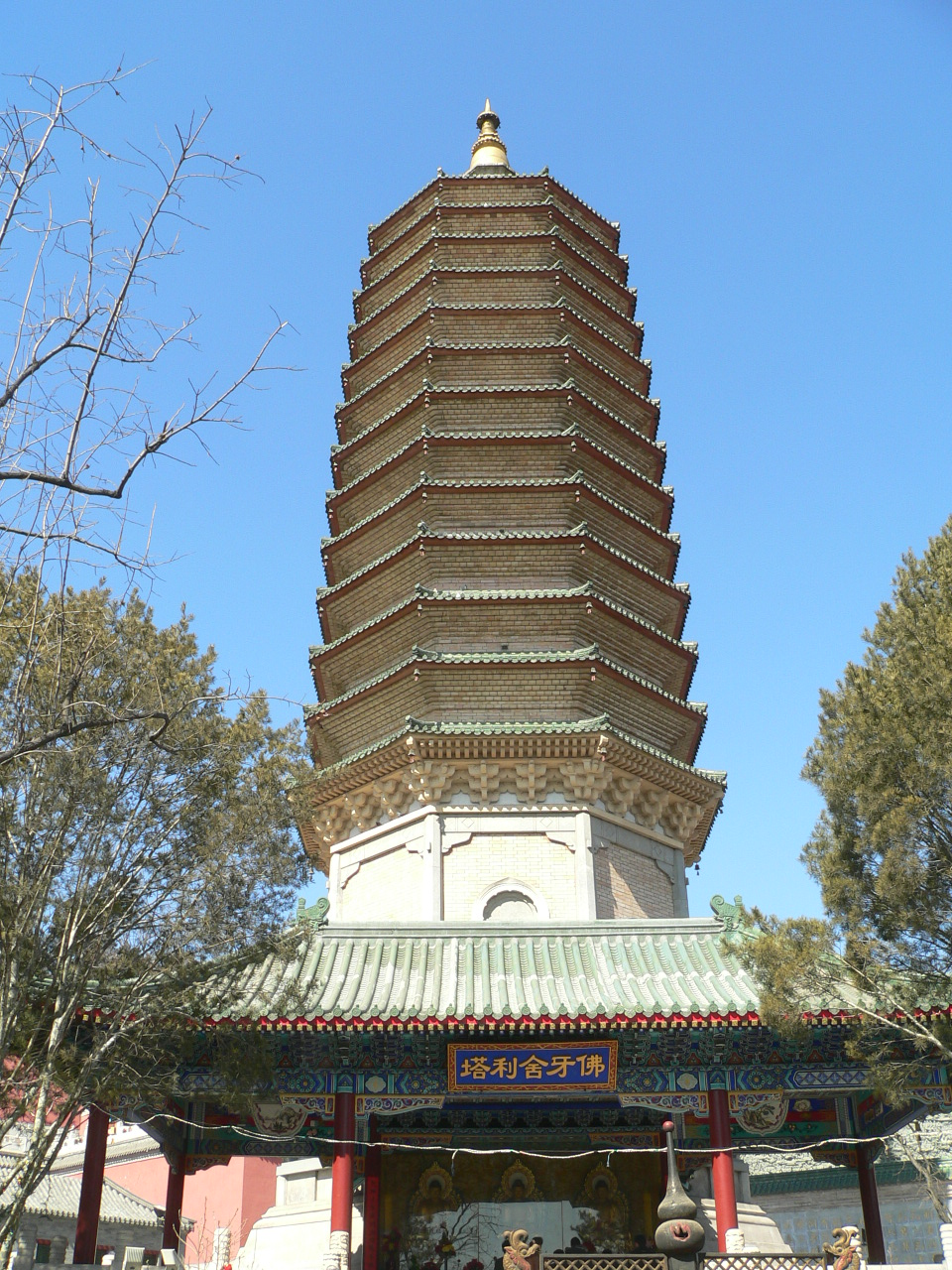
The Stupa of the tooth relic of the Buddha.

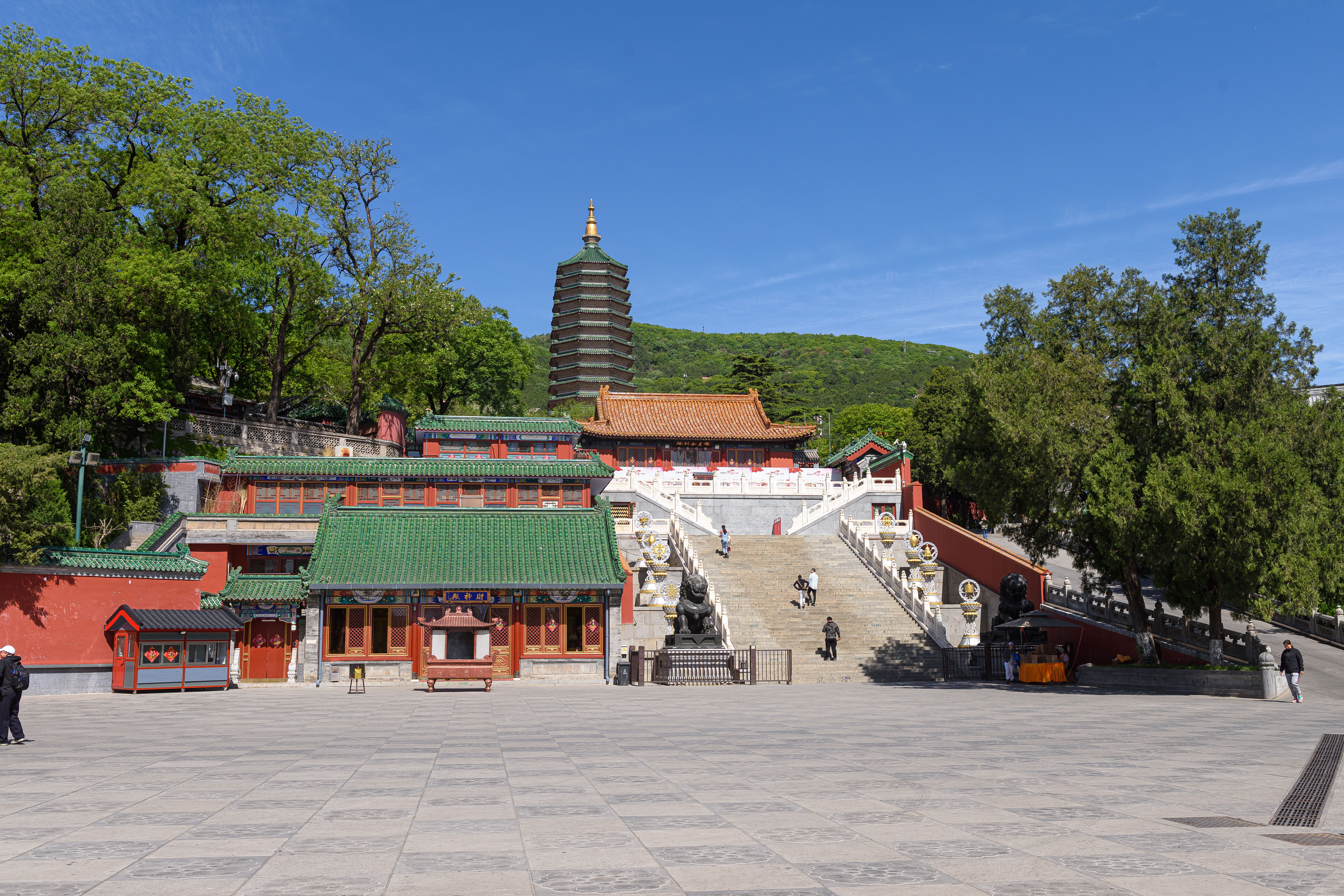
Overview of Lingguang Temple in April 2025

=== Shanmen ===
A gilded statue of Sakyamuni is enshrined in the Shanmen. It was presented by the Supreme Patriarch of Thailand in July 1989. Statues of Guan Yu and Skanda are enshrined on the west and east sides.

=== Stupa ===
The stupa was built in 1957, with the support of the Beijing Municipal Government. The stupa is a multi-eaves style brick pagoda with 13 stories. It stands at a height of about 51 metres (167 ft), built on a 2.7-metre (8 ft 10 in) high stone foundation. The tooth relic of the Buddha is preserved in the stupa. It was consecrated by exceptional monks on June 25, 1964.

=== Zhaoxian Pagoda ===
The Zhaoxian Pagoda (招仙塔) was built in 1071 during the Liao dynasty. It was known as the "Thousand Buddha Pagoda" due to more than one thousand exquisite niches with small statues of Buddha which were carved on the body of the pagoda. The pagoda was completely destroyed by the Eight-Nation Alliance in 1900 with only the stone foundation remaining.

=== Jade Buddha Hall ===
The Jade Buddha Hall was established in 2000 by the Buddhist Association of China. The hall enshrines the Three Life Buddha, namely, Sakyamuni, Amitabha, and Bhaisajyaguru. The statue of Bhaisajyaguru was presented by Than Shwe, chairman of State Peace and Development Council.

=== Reclining Buddha Hall ===
In the middle of the Reclining Buddha Hall is placed the statue of Maitreya, with the statue of Reclining Buddha at his back.

=== Hall of Dragon King ===
The Hall of Dragon King enshrines the statue of the Dragon King.

=== Great Compassion Temple ===
The Great Compassion Temple (大悲院) is divided into three halls: the Shanmen, the Hall of Thousand Armed and Eyed Guanyin, and the Reclining Buddha Hall.

A wood carving statue of the Thousand Armed and Eyed Guanyin is enshrined in the middle of the hall and at the back of Guanyin's statue is a statue of Guan Yu.

The Reclining Buddha Hall enshrines a wood carving statue of the Reclining Buddha, which was carved by Ito Shinjo (伊藤真乘), the founder of Japanese Buddhism Shinnyo-en.
