= Sidney Clive =

British Army general (1874–1959)

Lieutenant-General Sir Sidney Clive GCVO KCB CMG DSO DL JP
- Born: 16 July 1874
- Died: 7 October 1959 (aged 85)
- Military career
- Allegiance: United Kingdom
- Branch: British Army
- Service years: 1893–1934
- Rank: Lieutenant-General
- Unit: Grenadier Guards
- Conflicts: Mahdist War; Second Boer War; First World War
- Awards: Knight Grand Cross of the Royal Victorian Order; Knight Commander of the Order of the Bath; Companion of the Order of St Michael and St George; Distinguished Service Order; Grand Officer of the Legion of Honour

Lieutenant-General Sir George Sidney Clive GCVO KCB CMG DSO DL JP (16 July 1874 – 7 October 1959) was a British Army officer who served as military secretary.

== Background and education ==
Clive was the son of General Edward Clive and Isabel Webb and he was educated at Harrow School and the Royal Military College, Sandhurst.

== Military career ==
Clive was commissioned into the Grenadier Guards in October 1893, and promoted to lieutenant on 26 October 1897. He took part in the military expedition to the Sudan in 1898, and was promoted to captain on 28 January 1900, during a temporary appointment as adjutant of the 3rd battalion (19 January – 24 March 1900). He fought in the Second Boer War between 1900 and 1902; he was part of a detachment sent to South Africa on the SS "Umbria "in late March 1900 to reinforce the 3rd battalion. For his service in the war he was awarded the Distinguished Service Order (DSO).

He attended the Staff College, Camberley, in 1903, and became a general staff officer at the War Office in 1905. On 18 June 1908 he was appointed as a GSO3. In July 1909 he was promoted to major.

He served in the First World War as head of the British mission at the French Army headquarters from 1915 to the end of the War, for which he was promoted to temporary lieutenant colonel whilst employed in that role. He was also invested as a Companion of the Order of the Bath. He was also appointed a Companion of the Order of St Michael and St George. Clive, who in January 1917 became a brevet colonel, also received several decorations from France, Belgium and Russia.

After the War, in 1919, Clive was appointed military governor of Cologne and from 1919 to 1920, he was commander of the 1st Infantry Brigade at Aldershot (as a temporary brigadier). He was appointed British Military Representative to the Armaments Commission of the League of Nations in Geneva in 1921 and, after being promoted on 1 January 1924 to major general, was military attaché in Paris later that same year. He was appointed director of personal services at the War Office on 19 May 1928 and military secretary in 1930. He was promoted to lieutenant general on 15 January 1932 and was invested as a Knight Commander of the Order of the Bath (KCB) in 1933.

Clive retired from the army in 1934, as a lieutenant general, and served as Marshal of the Diplomatic Corps between 1934 and 1946 and as High Sheriff of Herefordshire in 1939. He was invested as a Knight Grand Cross of the Royal Victorian Order (GCVO) in 1937. Clive was a justice of the peace and the deputy lieutenant of Herefordshire.

He died on 7 October 1959 in a disastrous fire at the family home, Perrystone Court, near Ross-on-Wye.

== Family ==
On 26 March 1901 Clive married Madeline Buxton, and the couple had three sons (including Archer Clive, who fought with distinction in World War II) and two daughters.

== Awards and decorations ==
His awards and decorations were as follows:

- Knight Grand Cross of the Royal Victorian Order (1937)
- Knight Commander, Order of the Bath (1933)
- Companion of the Order of St. Michael and St. George (1919)
- Distinguished Service Order
- Croix de Guerre (France)
- Grand Officer of the Legion of Honour (France)
- Commander of the Order of the Crown (Belgium)
- Croix de Guerre (Belgium)
- Order of St. Stanislaus with swords (Russia)

Military offices
Preceded by Sir Gerald Boyd	Military Secretary; 1930–1934	Succeeded by Sir Charles Deedes
