= John Wylie (businessman) =

Australian investment banker

John Malcolm Rodney Wylie AC (born 1961) is an Australian investment banker. He was previously managing director and Head of Corporate Advisory of Lazard, Chair of the Melbourne Cricket Ground Trust and Chair of the Australian Sports Commission. He was President of the State Library of Victoria Board until 2021.

== Personal ==
Wylie was born in Brisbane, Queensland in 1961. His parents are Rodney and Nerida Wylie. He is married to Monaco born Myriam Boisbouvier and they have four sons. In 2011, his wife was appointed France's honorary consul in Victoria. He attended Brisbane Boys College. He holds a Bachelor of Commerce with first class honours from University of Queensland. In 1983, he was a Rhodes Scholar and completed a Master of Philosophy at Balliol College, Oxford University.

== Business ==
After completing his Rhodes Scholarship, he took up a position with First Boston in New York. He moved to Melbourne in 1991 with First Boston that later became Credit Suisse First Boston / Credit Suisse. He was managing director of Credit Suisse First Boston between 1994 and 1999. Major financial projects that he worked on included the privatisation of Qantas and Victorian Government's sell down of its power industry between 1993 and 1999. It has been stated that that power industry sale project made his career as it resulted in $14 billion more than initial revenue projections.

In 2000, Wylie with Mark Carnegie, formed Carnegie Wylie. In 2007, the business was acquired by Lazard. In 2013, he was the managing director of Lazard in Australia. Wylie's advice has been sought by significant companies including BHP, Telstra, Coles Myer, Transurban and Toll Holdings. He stepped down as head of Lazard Advisory in Australia at the end of 2014.

== Sport ==
Wylie was Chairman of the Melbourne Cricket Ground Trust from 1998 to March 2013. In 1999, he negotiated a deal where MCG received $5 million a year from the Australian Football League for 30 years. From 2001 to 2006, as chairman, he oversaw the Ground's $465 million redevelopment for the Melbourne 2006 Commonwealth Games

In September 2012, he was appointed Chairman of the Australian Sports Commission (ASC) taking over from Warwick Smith. He announced a new elite sport strategy for Australian sport called Winning Edge 2012–2022. His term as Chair finished in November 2020.

Wylie's passion for sport also includes playing cricket and marathon running, accredited cricket coach, coaching his sons' cricket team, attending Caulfield Bears junior football club games, Chairman of the Victorian Olympic Council Foundation Committee and Deputy President of Melbourne Stars. He is a Collingwood Football Club supporter.

In 2022, Wylie was awarded the Paralympic Medal by Paralympics Australia.

== Community ==
Besides his sport appointments, he was Honorary Treasurer of the Florey Neurosciences Institutes between 2007 and 2009. In May 2012, he replaced John Cain as President of the Library Board of Victoria. He is a Trustee Emeritus of the Global Rhodes Trust.

In 2006, Wylie walked the Kokoda Trail with a group called "Once Were Warriors". Members of the group included prominent Australians Simon Crean, Ron Barassi, Paul Little and John Bertrand.

In 2007, he was awarded Member of the Order of Australia (AM) for services to the investment banking and financial services industry, and to the community through sporting and medical organisations. Wylie was promoted to Companion (AC) in the 2022 Australia Day Honours for "eminent service to the community through leadership in the sporting, cultural, philanthropic and business sectors".

In January 2015, it was announced that Wylie and his wife had donated $5 million to the University of Melbourne to establish a professorship of Australian literature.
