= John Wylie (surgeon) =

Scottish military surgeon (1790-1852)

Surgeon General John Wylie CB FRSE FRCS (1790–1852) was a 19th-century Scottish military surgeon.

== Life ==
He was born in Glasgow on 20 May 1790 the son of George Wylie. He trained as a surgeon and in 1812 entered the Madras Army of the East India Company as an Assistant Surgeon. He saw active service during the Third Maratha War 1817/18 and was mentioned in dispatches for his actions at the Battle of Corygaum (January 1818).

In 1825 he was promoted full Surgeon and gradually rose through the ranks to be firstly Inspector General of all Indian Hospitals in 1846 then Surgeon General of India in 1851. In 1844 he was one of 29 officers in the Indian Medical Service who was elected a Fellow of the Royal College of Surgeons.

In 1850 he was created a Commander of the Order of the Bath (CB) by Queen Victoria, and was the first medical officer to receive this honour.

In 1852 he was elected a Fellow of the Royal Society of Edinburgh. His proposer was Andrew Douglas Maclagan.

He died suddenly at his home, Arndean, south of Dollar, Clackmannanshire, on 16 June 1852.

Arndean passed to George Wylie, who was either a son or a nephew. The gardens of Arndean are now open to the public under the Scotland's Gardens Scheme.
