= Wylye (disambiguation) =

Wylye is a village and civil parish in Wiltshire, England.

Wylye may also refer to:

- Wylye railway station, serving the village
- River Wylye, Wiltshire, England

== See also ==
- Wiley (disambiguation)
- Wily (disambiguation)
- Wylie (disambiguation)
- Wyllie
- Wyle (disambiguation)
- Wyly
