= George Wyllie (British Army soldier) =

Recipient of the George Cross

- Born: 25 December 1908; Hurlford, Scotland
- Died: 1 February 1987 (aged 78); Tower Hamlets, England
- Military career
- Allegiance: United Kingdom
- Branch: British Army
- Service years: 1939–1943
- Rank: Sapper
- Unit: Royal Engineers
- Conflicts: Second World War
- Awards: George Cross

George Cameron Wyllie, GC (25 December 1908 – 1 February 1987) of the Royal Engineers was awarded the George Cross for the heroism he displayed on 12 September 1940 when a 1,000-kilogram (2,200 lb) bomb fell near St Paul's Cathedral in Deans Yard. It took three days to dig the bomb out of soft soil, work made even more dangerous by a fire at a fractured gas main. Wylie and his team placed the recovered bomb on a lorry, which was driven to Hackney Marshes, where the bomb was detonated, leaving a crater 100 feet (30 m) wide.

The citation from a supplement to The London Gazette of 27 September 1940 (dated 30 September 1940) reads:

CENTRAL CHANCERY OF THE ORDERS OF KNIGHTHOOD.

St. James's Palace, S.W.1, 30th September, 1940.

The KING has been graciously pleased to approve the award of the GEORGE CROSS to the undermentioned:—

[...]

No. 1942531 Sapper George Cameron Wylie, Royal Engineers.

Sapper Wylie was a member of the Bomb Disposal Section engaged upon the recovery of the bomb which fell in the neighbourhood of St. Paul's Cathedral.

The actual discovery and removal of the bomb fell to him. Sapper Wylie's untiring energy, courage, and disregard for danger were an outstanding example to his comrades.
