= Sandy Wylie, Lord Kinclaven =

Scottish advocate and judge

The Honourable Lord Kinclaven OBE

Senator of the College of Justice
- In office 2005–2020
- Nominated by: Jack McConnell; As First Minister
- Monarch: Elizabeth II

Personal details
- Born: Alexander Featherstonhaugh Wylie; 2 June 1951 (age 75)
- Education: University of Edinburgh
- Profession: Advocate

Alexander Featherstonhaugh Wylie, Lord Kinclaven OBE (/ˈwaɪli ... kɪnˈklævən/; born 2 June 1951) was a Senator of the College of Justice, a judge of the Supreme Courts of Scotland.

== Early life ==
Wylie was educated at Perth Academy, Aberdeen Grammar School and the independent Kelvinside Academy, Glasgow, studied at the School of Law of the University of Edinburgh and qualified as a solicitor in 1976. He was admitted to the Faculty of Advocates in 1978.

== Legal career ==
Wylie served as Standing Junior Counsel to the Accountant of Court from 1986 to 1989, and as an Advocate Depute from 1989 to 1992. He was called to the Bar in England and Wales in 1990 at Lincoln's Inn, and took silk in Scotland in 1991. He was appointed a part-time Sheriff and a member of the Scottish Council of Law Reporting in 2000, part-time Chairman of the Police Appeals Tribunal in 2001, and a member of the Scottish Criminal Cases Review Commission in 2004, remaining in all these positions until his appointment to the Bench in 2005.

Wylie was appointed a Senator of the College of Justice in 2005, a judge of the Court of Session and High Court of Justiciary, with the judicial title, Lord Kinclaven. Kinclaven is a civil parish in Perthshire. He retired in 2020.

Lord Kinclaven was appointed Officer of the Order of the British Empire (OBE) in the 2017 New Year Honours for services to the introduction of the Scottish legal system in schools (pertaining to the mini trials competition for senior pupils).
