= John Wyly =

Member of the Parliament of England

John Wyly (1367–1400) was a verderer and the member of the Parliament of England for Marlborough for the parliaments of February and September 1388.
