= Wily =

Wily or WILY could refer to:

== Computing and technology ==
- Wily (text editor), a text editor for Unix computer systems
- Wily Technology, American software company
- Ubuntu 15.10, the version of Ubuntu released in October 2015 with code name Wily Werewolf

== Arts, entertainment, and media ==
- WILY, a radio station (1210 AM) licensed to Centralia, Illinois, United States
- Dr. Wily, a video game character and the main antagonist of the Mega Man franchise
- WWNL, a radio station (1080 AM) licensed to Pittsburgh, Pennsylvania, United States, known as WILY 1947 to 1957

== People ==
- Wily Mo Peña (born 1982), Dominican baseball player
- Wily Peralta (born 1989), Dominican baseball player

== See also ==
- Willy (disambiguation)
- Wiley (disambiguation)
- Wyle (disambiguation)
- Wylie (disambiguation)
- Wyllie
- Wylye (disambiguation)
