= John Wyllie (politician) =

British politician and civil servant

John Wyllie CSI MP

Member of Parliament for Hereford
- In office 17 November 1868 – 15 March 1869 Serving with George Clive
- Preceded by: George Clive; Richard Baggallay
- Succeeded by: Edward Clive; Chandos Wren-Hoskyns

Personal details
- Born: 6 October 1835 Poona, Bombay Presidency
- Died: 15 March 1870 (aged 34) Paris, France
- Resting place: Kensal Green Cemetery, London
- Party: Liberal
- Parent(s): William Wyllie; Amelia Hutt
- Education: Trinity College, Oxford

John William Shaw Wyllie, CSI MP, (6 October 1835 – 15 March 1870) was a British Liberal Party politician and British Indian civil servant.

== Early life ==
Wyllie was the son of British Army officer Sir William Wyllie and Amelia (née Hutt), and was born while his father was on tour in Poona, under the Bombay presidency. He returned to Britain with his mother in 1841, and was then educated by a private tutor at Edinburgh Academy, and then, between 1849 and 1853, at Cheltenham College with his brother Frank.

Intended by his father to join the Indian Civil Service, Wyllie obtained a nomination by his uncle William Hutt to attend the University of Oxford, ultimately winning an open scholarship at Trinity College in 1854, and resigning another he had gained at Lincoln College in 1853. He graduated in 1855 with a first class in moderations, and then passed the examination for the Indian Civil Service.

On furlough from 1864 to 1865, he returned to Trinity College to sit his examinations, receiving a Bachelor of Arts in 1864, and a Master of Arts in 1868.

== Indian civil service ==
Wyllie followed in his father's footsteps, joining the Bombay Presidency, and a 'competition-wallah', moving to India in November 1856. He then became, in January 1858, a third assistant political agent in Kathiawar, before in June, nearly dying of Gujarat fever, which permanently impaired his health.

During this period, Wyllie translated Colonel Lang's Mulk Sherista into English and also served as an assistant commissioner in Barabanki district and Lucknow. He then became an assistant secretary to Sir George Yule in 1862, also acting as chief commissioner of the province, and in May 1862 became Calcutta Secretariat upon the recommendation of Sir Henry Marion Durand.

In 1866, he was made an under-secretary to the foreign department, becoming an exponent of foreign policy in an article, The foreign policy of Lord Lawrence, which extolled the governor-general's policy. When published in the Edinburgh Review in January 1867, he influenced public opinion, bringing the phrase 'masterly inactivity' into the common lexicon.

In his final days in India, Wyllie arranged the grand durbar at Agra in November 1866.

== Return to Britain ==
A deterioration in health, caused by his earlier Gujarat fever, forced Wyllie to return home in 1867 and, upon persuasion by his uncle, Sir William Hutt, he gave up his Indian career to enter home politics.

He was elected MP for Hereford in 1868, standing on a platform of Irish disestablishment and secular education. During the election, he resigned from the Indian service, worrying he would be disqualified for holding an office of profit under the crown.

However, Wyllie was shortly after unseated in March 1869, after the Conservative rivals had alleged bribery and treating. Indeed, the election was declared void on petition, after the Liberal agent was found to have "given breakfast to Liberal electors", and therefore was guilty of treating.

Wyllie did no re-stand in the resulting by-election, lamenting that "he had foresaken the Indian service for a career that now sunk under him; he had burned his ships and could not return".

== Later life and death ==
Wyllie continued to write after his failed election, including Masterly inactivity, published by The Fortnightly Review in December 1869, defending Lawrence's non-interventionist policy towards Afghanistan and opposing occupation of Quetta, Pakistan; and Mischievous activity, published also The Fortnightly Review in March 1870, criticising Lord Mayo's more interventionist external policy.

Wyllie also contributed to the Cornhill Magazine, the Edinburgh Review, and the Calcutta Review, and wrote letters for The Times and publications focused on central Asia.

On 2 June 1869, he was made a Companion of the Order of the Star of India (CSI) for Indian Services and, in January 1870, he moved to Paris to improve his French and study French politics. While there, he suffered from a cold, then inflammation of the lungs and recurred malarial fever, before dying aged 34 at the Hôtel Vouillemont on 15 March 1870. He was temporarily interred at Montmartre, before his remains were moved to Kensal Green Cemetery.

Parliament of the United Kingdom
Preceded by George Clive; Richard Baggallay	Member of Parliament for Hereford; 1868–1869; With: George Clive	Succeeded by Edward Clive; Chandos Wren-Hoskyns
