= Edward Clive (British Army officer) =

British Army general (1837–1916)

General Edward Clive DL JP
- Born: 23 September 1837
- Died: 1 March 1916 (aged 78)
- Military career
- Allegiance: United Kingdom
- Branch: British Army
- Service years: 1854–1898
- Rank: General
- Commands: Staff College, Sandhurst; Royal Military College, Sandhurst

General Edward Henry Clive, DL, JP (23 September 1837 – 1 March 1916) was a British soldier and Liberal politician, the son of George Clive and Ann Sybella Martha, daughter of Sir Thomas Farquhar, 2nd Baronet.

== Military career ==
Educated at Harrow, Clive was commissioned as an ensign in the Rifle Brigade on 18 August 1854 and then transferred to the Grenadier Guards as ensign and lieutenant on 8 December that year. He served in the Eastern campaign from 1855 to 1856, after the fall of Sevastopol; this was his only war service. He was appointed an Instructor of Musketry in his regiment on 30 April 1857 and purchased his promotion to lieutenant and captain on 17 July. He was promoted to captain and lieutenant-colonel, again by purchase, on 8 March 1864, and on completion of the qualifying period of service was granted brevet rank as colonel on 4 March 1876. He became major in the Grenadier Guards on 11 October 1879 and lieutenant-colonel on 7 August 1880, and commanded the regiment from 1880 until he was placed on half-pay, 27 July 1885, and granted local rank as a brigadier-general while commanding the Brigade of Guards in Cyprus.

Clive was appointed Commandant at the Staff College, Sandhurst, on 21 December 1885 and was promoted to major-general on 26 December. He became Governor and Commandant of the Royal Military College, Sandhurst on 12 August 1888, remaining in that post until 1893. He was promoted lieutenant-general on 1 April 1892 and general on 12 January 1898, and retired on 19 December 1898. On 30 December 1906 he was made colonel of the King's (Liverpool Regiment).

== Political career ==
Clive succeeded his father (who had been unseated on petition) as Member of Parliament for Hereford in 1869, but only held the seat until 1871, when he resigned through appointment as Steward of the Chiltern Hundreds. He never returned to the House of Commons. He was also a Deputy Lieutenant of Herefordshire and County Mayo, and Justice of the Peace for Herefordshire and County Mayo.

== Family ==
Clive married in 1867 Isabel Webb, daughter of Daniel Hale Webb. They had five sons and four daughters:

- Sybil Mary Clive (1869–1961), who married in 1896 Captain Clifton Charles Orby Gascoigne (1870–1940)
- Kathleen Isabel Clive (1873–1961)
- Lieutenant-General Sir George Sidney Clive (1874–1959)
- Laura Cicely Clive (1876–1954), who married in 1902 Brigadier-General Sir Ernest Frederick Orby Gascoigne (1873–1944), Grenadier Guards. Bamber Gascoigne is their grandson.
- Captain Edward Archer Bolton Clive (1878–1928)
- Arthur Chaloner Clive (1879–1880)
- Judith Evelyn Clive (1880–1960), who married in 1911 Reverend Nixon Chetwode Ram (d.1952)
- Richard Alfred Clive (1882–1964)
- Henry Ambrose Clive (1885–1960)

Clive lived at 25 Ennismore Gardens, SW; at Perrystone Court, Ross; and at Ballycroy, County Mayo. He was a member of the United Service Club and the Travellers' Club. He died in March 1916, aged 78. His wife survived him by six years and died in April 1922.

Parliament of the United Kingdom
Preceded by George Clive; John Wyllie	Member of Parliament for Hereford; 1869–1871; With: Chandos Wren-Hoskyns	Succeeded by Chandos Wren-Hoskyns; George Arbuthnot
Military offices
Preceded by Charles Creagh-Osborne	Commandant of the Staff College, Sandhurst; 1885–1888	Succeeded by Francis Clery
Preceded by David Anderson (Governor); Aylmer Cameron (Commandant)	Governor and Commandant of the Royal Military College Sandhurst; 1888–1893	Succeeded by Sir Cecil East
Honorary titles
Preceded by George Edward Baynes	Colonel of the King's (Liverpool Regiment); 1906–1916	Succeeded by Sir Henry Mackinnon
