= Richard Weaver (MP) =

English politician

Arms of Weaver, adopted c.1370: Quarterly, 1&4: Or on a fess Azure cotised Gules two garbs Or. 2: Azure on a bend cotised Argent three escallops Gules (Bohun). 3: Sable a lion rampant double-queued Argent (Wastneys)

Richard Weaver (1575 – 16 May 1642) was an English politician who sat in the House of Commons variously between 1621 and 1642.

Weaver was the son of Edmund Weaver of Stapleton, Llanandrad, Herefordshire and his wife Margery Burhope.

In 1621, Weaver was elected Member of Parliament for Hereford and was re-elected until 1626. In 1627 he was elected Mayor of Hereford.

In April 1640, Weaver was elected again MP for Hereford in the Short Parliament and in November 1640 for the Long Parliament. He held the seat until his death in 1642. Weaver died at the Above Eigne, Hereford, aged 66 and was buried in Hereford Cathedral.

Weaver married Katherine Fox. Their son Edmund Weaver was also MP for Hereford.

Parliament of England
Preceded by John Hoskyns; John Warden	Member of Parliament for Hereford; 1621–1626; With: James Rodd 1621–1622; Sir James Clerk 1624–1626	Succeeded by Sir John Scudamore; John Hoskyns
Vacant Parliament suspended since 1629	Member of Parliament for Hereford; 1640–1642; With: Richard Seaborne	Succeeded by James Scudamore; Richard Seaborne
