= Chief Bailiff of Hereford =

Magistrate in Hereford before 1383

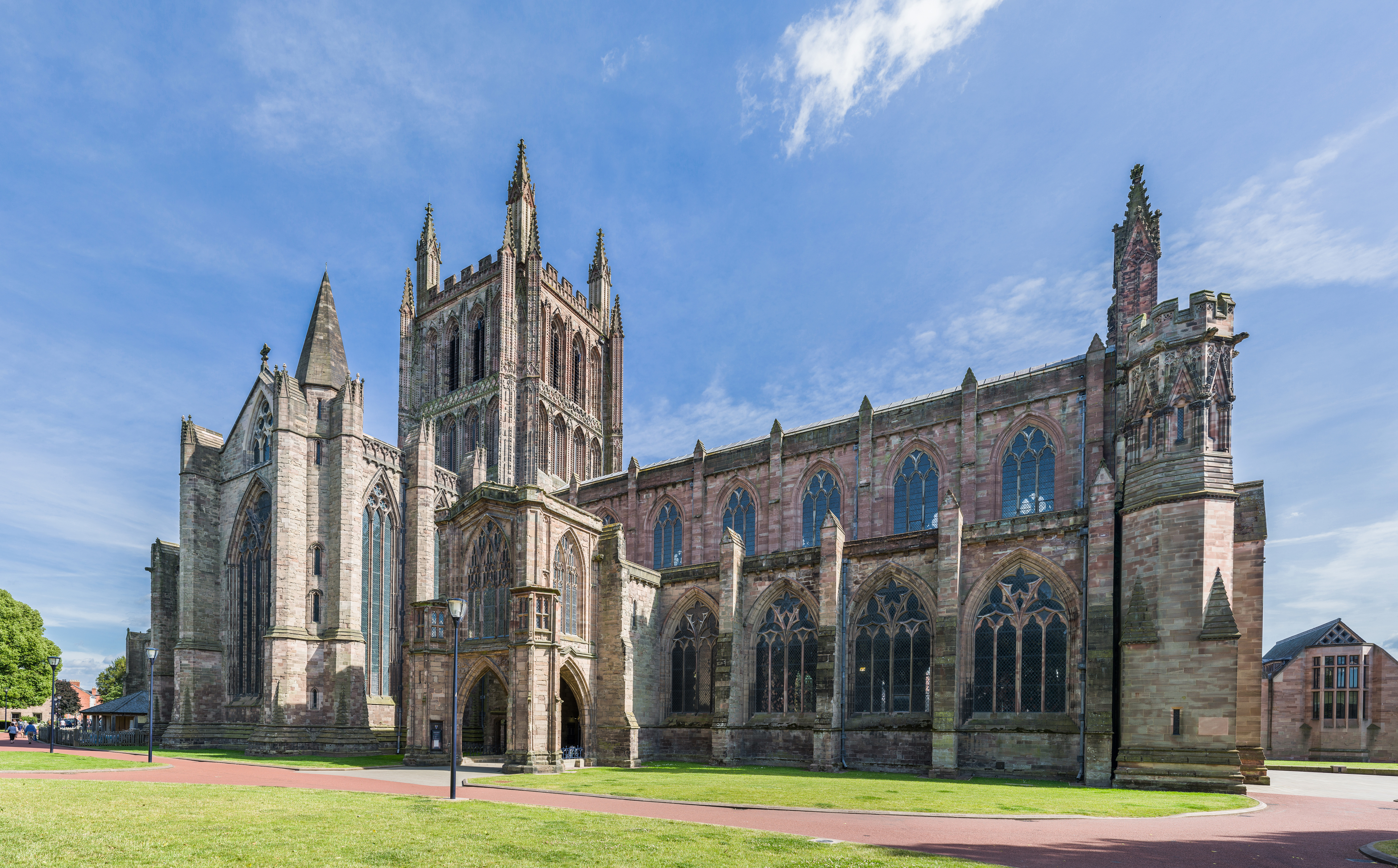
Hereford Cathedral

The chief bailiff of Hereford was the most senior secular magistrate in the city of Hereford, England, elected by the citizens of the city annually. The role was equivalent to that of a mayor, and was superseded by that title by letters patent issued by Richard II, King of England, on 15 November, 1383. One of the King's knights, Sir John Burley, had petitioned him for this change. There were typically also two under-bailiffs.

== List of chief bailiffs of Hereford ==
Richard Johnson's The Ancient Customs of the City of Hereford (1882) is the only source of a complete list of bailiffs of Hereford. The complete list does not appear on any contemporary documents, and it is unclear where Johnson got his information from. Not all the names survive on court rolls.

Date	Name
1268	Richard Bisse
1269	Adam Swain
1270	Adam Swain
1271	Walter le Wanter
1272	John Seym (Note: John Seym was probably the father of William Seym, MP for Hereford in 1305, 1306, and 1311, who received a pardon on 20 June 1293 "for the death of Giles de Burgillun".)
1273	Hugo Seward
1274	Reginald Moniword (Note: The Moniword family were the best known wool merchants in the county. John was MP in 1311, 1318 and 1322, Richard in 1326, and a different John in 1384.)
1275	Richard Moniword
1276	Richard Moniword
1277	John de Pyon
1278	Thomas de Pyon
1279	John Werrour
1280	John Catchpol (Note: Henry Catchpole (Bailiff in 1350 and 1354) was MP for Hereford in 1348, 1351, 1355 and 1357. He had been a wool trader, and died before August 1360. A different Henry Catchpole (Bailiff in 1369 and 1375) was MP for Hereford in 1361, 1366, 1369, 1371, 1378, 1383 and 1386, and Mayor of Hereford between 1384 and 1386. A third Henry Catchpole was MP in 1390.)
1281	John le Gaunter
1282	Hugo Doreward
1283	John le Suton
1284	John le Gaunter
1285	William Franklyn
1286	William Goudry
1287	John le Gaunter
1288	John le Gaunter
1289	William Framelyn
1290	John le Gaunter
1291	John le Gaunter
1292	Robert de Dyke
1293	Robert de Dyke
1294	Hugo Froue/Troue
1295	John Suton
1296	John Moniword
1297	Hugo Grovey
1298	William Vomaller
1299	John de Stretton
1300	William de Smey
1301	William de Smey
1302	Nicholas Iwayn
1303	Richard Moniword
1304	Hugh Froue/Troue
1307	Richard Moniword
1308	Richard Moniword
1309	Richard Moniword
1310	Richard Moniword
1311	Henry de Orleton (Note: Related to Richard de Orleton, MP for Hereford in 1306, and Adam Orleton, Bishop of Hereford, Worcester, and Winchester. William was MP for Hereford in 1322, 1324.)
1312	Richard de Cruse
1313	Thomas Tope
1314	William de Orleton
1315	Richard Thurgin
1316	Richard Thurgin
1317	Thomas Tope
1318	Richard Moniword
1319	Philip de Werrour
1320	Richard Moniword
1321	Philip de Werrour
1322	William de Orleton
1323	William de Staunton
1324	William de Orleton
1325	John de Lansale
1326	William Horeman

Date	Name
1327	Thomas Cope
1328	Robert de Hompton
1329	Robert de Hompton
1330	Robert de Hompton
1331	Robert de Hompton
1332	Robert de Hompton
1333	Robert de Hompton
1334	John de la Barre
1335	Thomas Thorpe
1336	Walter le Catchpole
1337	Roger Colling
1338	Walter le Catchpole
1339	Walter de la Barre
1340	Walter de la Barre
1341	Robert de Hompton
1342	Robert de Hompton
1343	Nicholas de Bromyard
1344	Richard Aubrey
1345	Richard Aubrey
1346	Nicholas de Bromyard
1347	Nicholas de Bromyard
1348	Nicholas de Bromyard
1349	Richard de Bromyard
1350	Richard de Bromyard
1351	Richard Hamond
1352	Henry Catchpole
1353	John le Bailiff
1354	John le Bailiff
1355	John Field
1356	Bartholomew le Clerk
1357	Henry Catchpole
1358	John le Clerk
1359	Walter de Ailmeston
1360	John Field
1361	Bartholomew le Clerk
1362	Walter Ailmeston
1363	Thomas Don
1364	Walter de Ailmeston
1365	Richard Elliot
1366	John Bailiff
1367	John Blod
1368	William Colling
1369	Henry Catchpole
1370	Richard Elliot
1371	John Blod
1372	Richard Elliot
1373	William Colling
1373	John Goldsmith
1375	Henry Catchpole
1376	William Delamere
1377	Richard Falke
1378	Hugh Osborne
1379	Richard Falke
1380	Richard Palmer
1381	Richard Falke
1382	Richard Falke
1383	Thomas Benger
1384–	Mayors of Hereford
