= John Abrahall =

15th-century English politician

- Died: 1443
- Occupation: politician

John Abrahall (died 1443) was an English politician.

He was born of Richard Abrahall, esquire, and Elizabeth Pichard. By September 1413, he entered the service of John, Lord Furnival (afterwards Lord Talbot and Earl of Shrewsbury). During his service "before his first return to Parliament in 1419, he had been implicated in two murders". But these violations didn't spoil his further service in 1417 as royal escheator of Herefordshire and the adjacent marches of Wales. After his first term at Parliament he returned to his land by September 1420 but didn't consent to come to terms with the new Lord Talbot, John, whom he had served before. They began quarrellings with Talbort because of lands possessions. There he again was in charge for murder of two local men and in 1427 he came before "the King’s bench but was dismissed for lack of impartial evidence".

Abrahall was appointed to the Herefordshire bench in 1437, and in 1439 he obtained the office of steward of the castle and town of Bronllys. Both positions were held by him till his death.

He served as Member of Parliament for Hereford in 1419, and for Herefordshire from 1437 to 1442. He was also justice of the peace in Herefordshire from 5 March 1437 to February 1443.

Parliament of England
Preceded by John Orchard	Member of Parliament for Hereford; 1419; With: Richard Strange	Succeeded by John Falk
Unknown	Member of Parliament for Herefordshire; 1437–1442; With: Unknown	Unknown
