= Thomas Chippenham =

Thomas Chippenham may refer to:

- Thomas Chippenham (priest), archdeacon of York and of Totnes
- Thomas Chippenham (fl. 1388–1402), MP for Hereford
- Thomas Chippenham (fl. 1420–1431), MP for Hereford
