= Pulsford =

Pulsford is a surname. Notable people with this surname include:

- Edward Pulsford (1844–1919), English-Australian politician
- Robert Pulsford (1814–1888), British politician
- William Pulsford (1772–1833), British merchant and plantation owner
