= Warnecombe =

Warnecombe is a surname. Notable people with the surname include:

- James Warnecombe (by 1523–1581), English politician
- Richard Warnecombe (by 1494–1547), English politician
