= Catchpole =

Catchpole is a surname and type of tax collector in medieval England. It is a combination of Old English (cace-, catch) and medieval Latin (pullus, a chick) and derives from the idea that people who owed tax were as difficult to catch as farmyard hens. The Catchpole name is from Dorset, southern England.

At that time, tax-gathering was contracted out in a system called tax farming. The catchpole paid a lump sum for authority to collect taxes from a given area or population, and was then able to keep whatever he could, using almost any method. Later, his duties were those of a legal official, working for the bailiff. He was mainly responsible for collecting debts, using methods hardly more restrained than those of his tax gathering forebears.

== Notable bearers ==
- Brent Catchpole, New Zealand politician
- Hugh Catchpole, academician and administrator
- George Catchpole (born 1994), British rugby player
- Heather Catchpole, Australian science communicator
- Henry Catchpole (disambiguation), multiple people
- James Morrison Catchpole, birth name of English singer-songwriter James Morrison
- Jordan Catchpole (born 1999), British Paralympic swimmer
- Judith Catchpole, colonial American maidservant
- Ken Catchpole (1939–2017), Australian rugby player
- Kylie Catchpole, Australian solar energy researcher
- Margaret Catchpole, British deportee to Australia

== In fiction ==
- Eric Catchpole, character in the British series Lovejoy
