= John Orchard (disambiguation) =

John Orchard (1928–1995) was an English actor.

John Orchard may also refer to:

- John Orchard (Australian politician) (1906–1995)
- John Orchard (MP) for Hereford (fl. 1417), English politician
- John Bernard Orchard (1910–2006), monk, teacher and theologian
- John Orchard (doctor) (born 1967), Australian sport and exercise medicine physician
