= John Falk (disambiguation) =

John Falk was a politician.

John Falk or Faulk may also refer to:

- John H. Falk (born 1948), professor at Oregon State University
- John Falk (racing driver) in 2002 Bathurst 24 Hour
- John Falk, screenwriter of Shot Through the Heart
- John Faulk (Texas politician) in United States House of Representatives elections in Texas, 2010
- John Henry Faulk, radio host
