= Gregory Price (politician) =

The Honourable Gregory Price JP DL
- Born: 6 August 1535; London
- Died: 19 March 1600 (aged 64)
- Resting place: Hereford Cathedral; 52.0542°N 2.716°W
- Occupation: Politician
- Spouses: Mary Coningsby (m. 1559) Grissel Roberts (m. 1598)
- Children: with Mary: John Price; with Grissel: Mary Price
- Parents: Sir John Price (father); Joan Williamson (mother)

Gregory Price (6 August 1535 – 19 March 1600) of Hereford, was an English politician. He served as member of parliament (MP) for Herefordshire and Hereford seven times between 1558 and 1597.

== Life ==
He was born in London on 6 August 1535, the eldest son of Sir John Price, of Brecon and Thomas Cromwell's niece, Joan (b. c. 1515/6), daughter of John Williamson, of Southwark.

Price was a justice of the peace (JP) for Herefordshire in 1564, quarter sessions by 1573/74 to 1600, and for Brecknockshire from 1591 to 1600.

He served as Sheriff of Herefordshire from 1566–67, 1575–76, 1595–96 and Sheriff of Brecknockshire from February to December 1587, and from 1594–95. He was Mayor of Hereford from 1573–74, 1576–77, 1597–98, and deputy lieutenant for Brecknockshire in 1587.

=== Family ===
He married firstly, by 1559, Mary, daughter of Humphrey Coningsby (d. 1558) of Hampton Court, Herefordshire, by whom he had a son:

- John Price

He married secondly, by 1598, Grissel (d. 1648), daughter of Walter Roberts of Glassenbury, Kent, widow of Gervase Gebons, by whom he had a daughter:

- Mary Price, married John Price (c. 1603–1669), son of Thomas Price (d, 1654) of Brecon and Anne, daughter of William Rudhale (Rudhall) of Rudhall.

He died on 19 March 1600. In his will, dated 13 March, he asked to be buried in Hereford Cathedral. He was survived by his wife, his daughter, Mary, and 2 illegitimate sons. His widow subsequently married, in June 1600, as his 4th wife, Sir John Poyntz of Iron Acton, Gloucestershire. She died in 1648.

Parliament of England
Preceded by John Baskerville; Stephen Parry	Member of Parliament for Herefordshire; 1558; With: John Pateshall	Succeeded by Robert Whitney; Humphrey Coningsby
Preceded by James Warnecombe; Thomas Church	Member of Parliament for Hereford; 1572–1598; With: James Warnecombe 1572–1583; James Boyle 1584–1585; Thomas Jones October 1586–1587; Nicholas Garnons 1589; Thomas Mallard 1593; Anthony Pembridge 1597–1598	Succeeded by Walter Hurdman; Thomas Jones
