= John Prophet (disambiguation) =

John Prophet (died 1416), was Dean of Hereford and York.

John Prophet may also refer to:

- John Prophet (MP died 1416), see City of London (elections to the Parliament of England)
- John Prophet (MP died c.1399), MP for Hereford
- John the Prophet, known also as Venerable John
