= John Scudamore, 1st Viscount Scudamore =

English diplomat and politician

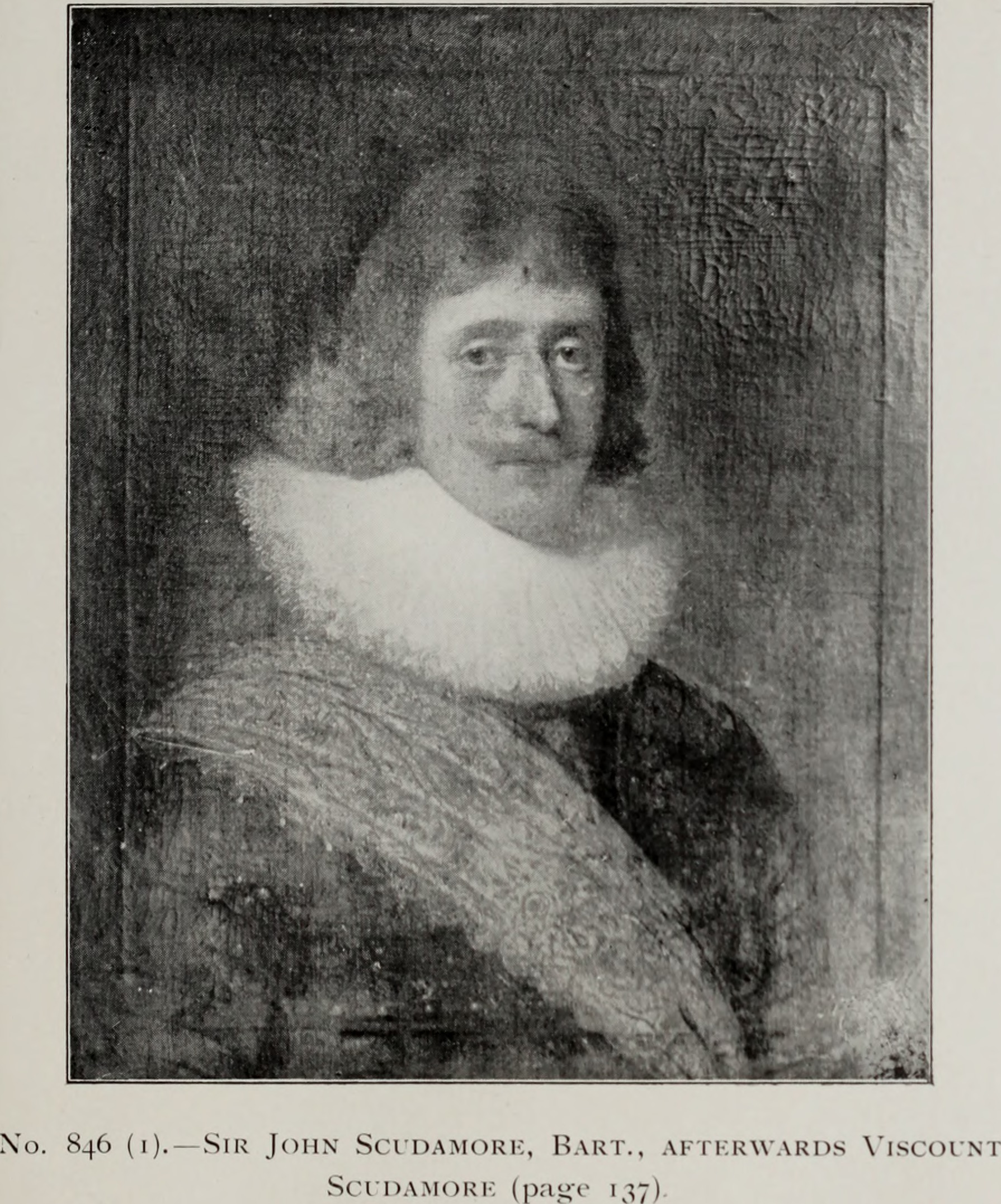
John Scudamore, 1st Viscount Scudamore

John Scudamore, 1st Viscount Scudamore (22 March 1601 – 19 May 1671) was an English diplomat and politician who sat in the House of Commons at various times between 1621 and 1629. In 1628 he was created Viscount Scudamore in the Irish peerage.

== Early life ==
Scudamore was the eldest son of Sir James Scudamore, of Holme Lacy, Herefordshire, and Mary Scudamore, daughter of Sir Thomas Throckmorton. He matriculated at Magdalen College, Oxford, on 8 November 1616 and was admitted to the Middle Temple in 1617. From November 1618, he travelled in France, and returned the following year after the death of his father. His grandfather Sir John Scudamore obtained a baronetcy for him on 1 June 1620, giving him precedence locally three years.

His younger brother was Barnabas Scudamore, the Civil War commander who led Royalist forces in the successful defence of Hereford in 1645.

== Career ==
In 1621, Scudamore was elected Member of Parliament for Herefordshire. He was appointed a Justice of the Peace in 1622. By 1622, he had a warm friendship with William Laud (later Archbishop of Canterbury), and followed his religious views. One aspect of this was his restoration of the church of Abbey Dore, the church of the former Cistercian abbey, whose estates had come to his family at the dissolution. He did this in full Laudian style. He also did work on other churches, and endowed some with impropriate tithes. Scudamore succeeded his grandfather in the family estate in 1623. He was one of the Council of the Marches on 25 August 1623. In 1624, he was re-elected MP for Herefordshire. He was created Baron Dromore and Viscount Scudamore in the peerage of Ireland on 1 July 1628. Also in 1628, he was elected MP for Hereford and sat until 1629, when King Charles decided to rule without parliament for eleven years.

From 1635 to 1639, Scudamore was ambassador to France, and caused controversy by adorning the embassy chapel in Laudian style. However, the Earl of Leicester who was staunchly Protestant was appointed as extraordinary ambassador over his head, with the result that they two could not agree on policy.

Scudamore was not particularly active on his return to England and his early participation in the English Civil War was limited. He was one of the "Nine Worthies" – nine justices who formed the royalist leadership in Herefordshire in the summer of 1642. The other "worthies" were Sir William Croft, Wallop Brabazon, Thomas Wigmore of Shobden, Thomas Price of Wisterdon, William Smallman, Henry Lingen, William Rudhall and Fitzwilliam Coningsby. Partly as a result of his rivalry with Coningsby for control of Herefordshire, Hereford was surrendered to a small Parliamentarian force in 1643. Scudamore was sent to London as a delinquent and remained there under house arrest until 1647. After the English Restoration, he resumed various local offices.

== Legacy ==
In 1615, Scudamore married Elizabeth Porter, daughter of Sir Arthur Porter of Llanthony Secunda, Gloucester, and his wife Ann Danvers, daughter of John Danvers, of Dauntsey, Wiltshire. A painting by Marcus Gheeraerts the younger was commissioned to commemorate this.

Scudamore died at the age of 70. His son, James Scudamore (died 1668), predeceased him. He was succeeded in his titles by his grandson, John Scudamore.

Parliament of England
Preceded by Sir James Scudamore; Sir Herbert Croft	Member of Parliament for Herefordshire; 1621–1624; With: Fitzwilliam Coningsby; Sir Robert Harley	Succeeded by John Rudhale; Giles Brydges
Preceded by Sir James Clerke; Richard Weaver	Member of Parliament for Hereford; 1628–1629; With: John Hoskins	Parliament suspended until 1640
Peerage of Ireland
New creation	Viscount Scudamore; 1628–1671	Succeeded by John Scudamore
Baronetage of England
New creation	Baronet (of Holme Lacy); 1620–1671	Succeeded by John Scudamore
