= Valiant Hearts =

Valiant Hearts may refer to:

- Valiant Hearts: The Great War, 2014 puzzle adventure video game
- Cœurs Vaillants ("Brave Hearts"), 1929–1981 Catholic French language weekly newspaper for French children
- "O Valiant Hearts", hymn often used in Remembrance services
- Valiant Hearts (film), a 2021 French-Belgian film by Mona Achache
