= James Clerke =

English lawyer and politician

Sir James Clerke (born c. 1584) was an English lawyer and politician who sat in the House of Commons between 1624 and 1626.

Clerke was of Herefordshire. He matriculated at Brasenose College, Oxford on 19 April 1599, aged 15 and was possibly awarded BA from Hart Hall, Oxford. He was called to the bar at Inner Temple in 1610. In 1624, he was elected Member of Parliament for Hereford and was re-elected in 1625 and 1626.

Parliament of England
Preceded by Richard Weaver; John Rodd	Member of Parliament for Hereford; 1624–1626; With: Richard Weaver	Succeeded by The Viscount Scudamore; John Hoskins
