= Henry Catchpole =

Henry Catchpole may refer to:

- Henry Catchpole (fl. 1361–1386), MP for Hereford 1361–1386
- Henry Catchpole (fl. 1390), MP for Hereford in 1390, son of the above
