= Richard Ash =

Richard Ash may refer to:

- Richard Ash (MP) (died 1394/1395), or Nash, English politician
- Richard Ash (American football) (born 1992), American football defensive tackle

== See also ==
- Richard Ashe (disambiguation)
