= Thomas Bromwich =

Thomas Bromwich may refer to:

- Thomas John I'Anson Bromwich (1875–1929), English mathematician
- Thomas Bromwich (MP), English politician
