= Frank Owen (politician) =

British journalist, writer and politician (1905–1979)

Frank Owen OBE
- Photo of Owen published in 1929

Member of Parliament for Hereford
- In office 30 May 1929 – 7 October 1931
- Preceded by: Samuel Roberts
- Succeeded by: James Thomas

Personal details
- Born: 4 November 1905 Hereford, Herefordshire, England
- Died: 23 January 1979 (aged 73)
- Party: Liberal
- Spouse: Grace Stewart McGillivray (m. 1939; died 1968)
- Education: Monmouth School
- Alma mater: Sidney Sussex College, Cambridge

Humphrey Frank Owen OBE (4 November 1905 – 23 January 1979) was a British journalist, writer, and radical Liberal Member of Parliament. He was Liberal MP for Hereford between 1929 and 1931. He was an editor of the Evening Standard and the Daily Mail. He was awarded the OBE in 1946.

== Background ==
Frank Owen was born in Hereford on 4 November 1905, the son of innkeeper Thomas Humphrey Owen and Cicely Hannah Green. He was educated at Monmouth School and Sidney Sussex College, Cambridge. He graduated from Cambridge with honours in history. He married Grace Stewart McGillivray of Boston, USA in 1939. She died in 1968.

== Journalism and books ==
He worked as a journalist on the South Wales Argus (1928–29), the Daily Express (1931–37) and was editor of the Evening Standard (1938–41). He was strongly anti-Nazi, and during the years of appeasement he made a feature of rewriting Mein Kampf week after week to sound the alarm. In 1940, along with Michael Foot and Peter Howard he was one of the authors of Guilty Men, a denunciation of appeasement and an attack on Neville Chamberlain and Lord Halifax, amongst others.

During the Second World War, he served with the Royal Tank Regiment (1942–43) and was commissioned in September 1943. He served with South East Asia Command (1944–46); editing SEAC, the services newspaper of South East Asia Command, at the request of Louis Mountbatten. For his services in South East Asia Lt-Col Owen was made an OBE. He was editor of the Daily Mail from 1947–50.

Apart from Guilty Men, his other books include: The Three Dictators: Mussolini, Stalin, Hitler (1941), The Fall of Singapore, The Campaign in Burma (1946), The Eddie Chapman Story (with Eddie Chapman, 1953), and Tempestuous Journey: Lloyd George His Life and Times (1954).

== Political career ==
In 1929 he volunteered to assist Liberal Party headquarters in London with election propaganda. At the eleventh hour he was selected as Liberal candidate for his home constituency of Hereford at the 1929 General Election. It was a supposedly safe Unionist seat that the Liberals had not won since 1892.

General election 30 May 1929: Hereford Electorate 36,984
Party	Candidate	Votes	%	±%
Liberal	Frank Owen	14,208	48.7	
Unionist	Frederic Carnegie Romilly	13,087	44.8	
Labour	Henry Cooper	1,901	6.5	
Majority		1,121	3.9	
Turnout			78.9	
Liberal gain from Unionist		Swing		

He was elected at the age of 23 years, 245 days. Upon taking his seat in the House of Commons he became the Baby of the House (the youngest member of the House of Commons). In 1931, when Liberal Party leader David Lloyd George decided to leave the National Government, Owen was the only Liberal MP who was not related to Lloyd George to remain loyal to his leader. Owen fought the 1931 General Election therefore as an official Liberal candidate opposed to the National government. He was comfortably defeated;

General election 27 October 1931: Hereford Electorate: 38,033
Party	Candidate	Votes	%	±%
Conservative	James Thomas	19,418	60.9	+12.2
Liberal	Frank Owen	12,465	39.1	−5.7
Majority		6,953	21.8	
Turnout			83.8	+4.9
Conservative gain from Liberal		Swing	+9.0	

He stepped away from politics to concentrate on his journalistic career. He wrote a sympathetic biography of his former leader Lloyd George, Tempestuous Journey: Lloyd George His Life and Times (Hutchinson of London; 1954). After a break of 24 years he again fought the Hereford seat in 1955. The Liberal party was very weak at the time, but he managed to achieve one of their better results, significantly pushing Labour into third place;

General election 1955: Hereford Electorate: 44,242
Party	Candidate	Votes	%	±%
Conservative	James Thomas	18,058	51.8	−9.5
Liberal	Frank Owen	8,658	24.8	n/a
Labour	E.L.P. Seers	8,154	23.4	−15.3
Majority		9,400	27.0	
Turnout		34,870	78.8	+1.2
Conservative hold		Swing	n/a	

His Conservative opponent was then elevated to the House of Lords causing a vacancy. Owen was chosen again as Liberal candidate for the 1956 Hereford by-election. The Liberal campaign was able to present him as the main challenger, having won second place in 1955. This helped him increase his vote and come to within 2,000 votes of the Tory candidate;

1956 Hereford by-election
Party	Candidate	Votes	%	±%
Conservative	David Gibson-Watt	12,129	44.3	−7.5
Liberal	Frank Owen	9,979	36.4	+11.6
Labour	Bryan Stanley	5,277	19.3	−4.1
Majority		2,150	17.9	
Turnout		27,385		
Conservative hold		Swing		

After this attempt he declined to stand for parliament again. He was replaced as Hereford Liberal candidate by Robin Day.

He was once asked whether it were true that he had been a Member of Parliament. "Yes," he said, "I was elected by the highly intelligent, far-sighted people of the constituency of Hereford in 1929 – and thrown out by the same besotted mob two years later." This is often misquoted.

In 1993 a biography Firebrand, the Frank Owen Story by Gron Williams was published by Square One Publications.

Parliament of the United Kingdom
Preceded by Samuel Roberts	Member of Parliament for Hereford; 1929–1931	Succeeded by James Thomas
Media offices
Preceded by Percy Cudlipp	Editor of the Evening Standard; 1938–1941	Succeeded by Michael Foot
Preceded by Sidney Horniblow	Editor of the Daily Mail; 1947–1950	Succeeded by Guy Schofield
