= Thomas Chippenham (fl. 1388–1402) =

English politician

Thomas Chippenham, of Hereford (fl. 1388–1402), was an English politician.

He was a member (MP) of the parliament of England for Hereford in February 1388 and 1402. He was made Mayor of Hereford for 1391–92 and 1398–1401.

Chippenham had three sons who were all MPs, Henry, Nicholas and Thomas.
