= Jonet =

Jonet is a surname. Notable people with the surname include:

- William Jonet (fl. 1381–1388), MP
- Marie Jonet Dugès (1730–1797), French midwife
