= William Speed =

English politician

William Speed (fl. 1384–1395) was an English politician.

He was a member (MP) of the parliament of England for Hereford in November 1384, 1385 and 1395.
