= Robert Reid, 1st Earl Loreburn =

British jurist and politician (1846–1923)

The Right Honourable The Earl Loreburn GCMG PC
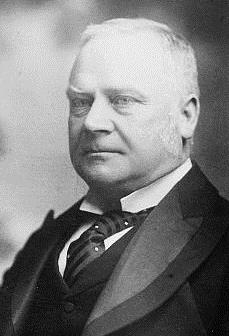
- Loreburn in 1908

Lord Chancellor
- In office 10 December 1905 – 10 June 1912
- Monarchs: Edward VII; George V
- Prime Minister: Sir Henry Campbell-Bannerman; H. H. Asquith
- Preceded by: The Earl of Halsbury
- Succeeded by: The Viscount Haldane

Personal details
- Born: 3 April 1846 Corfu Town, Corfu, United States of the Ionian Islands
- Died: 30 November 1923 (aged 77) Walmer, Kent
- Party: Liberal
- Spouse(s): (1) Emily Fleming (d. 1904) (2) Violet Hicks-Beach
- Education: Balliol College, Oxford

Robert Threshie Reid, 1st Earl Loreburn, GCMG, PC (3 April 1846 – 30 November 1923) was a British lawyer, judge and Liberal politician. A supporter of progressive social legislation, he served as Lord High Chancellor of Great Britain between 1905 and 1912.

== Background and education ==
Born in Corfu, the largest city on the island of the same name, Loreburn was the son of Sir James John Reid, Chief Justice of the Ionian Islands, at the time a British protectorate. His mother was Mary, daughter of Robert Threshie, formerly married to William Denholm Dalzell. Loreburn was educated at Cheltenham College and Balliol College, Oxford. While at Oxford, he represented the Oxford University Cricket Club in fifteen first-class matches as a wicket-keeper, spanning from 1865 to 1868. He remained involved in cricket for many years after, with appearances for the Marylebone Cricket Club (MCC) and Herefordshire at lower levels of the sport, amongst other sides.

== Political career ==
Loreburn's national political career began in 1880, when he was elected to the House of Commons as Member of Parliament for Hereford. He stayed there until 1885, when he ran unsuccessfully in Dunbartonshire, but returned to the Commons in 1886 for Dumfries Burghs. He remained in the House of Commons until 1905; during this time period, he was appointed to the offices of Solicitor General and knighted (1894) and Attorney General (1894–1895). He was appointed a Knight Grand Cross of the Order of St Michael and St George (GCMG) in 1899 for services in connection with the Venezuela Boundary Arbitration Commission. He left the House of Commons in 1905, though, and became Lord Chancellor under Sir Henry Campbell-Bannerman. On his appointment he was raised to the peerage as Baron Loreburn, of Dumfries in the County of Dumfries. (The Loreburn was a stream which historically ran close to Dumfries, and which was the source of the town's motto and rallying cry, "A Lore Burne".) Alternative explanations include the name coming from Dumfries’ motto ‘A Lore burne’, based on the war-cry ‘To the Lower Burn’.

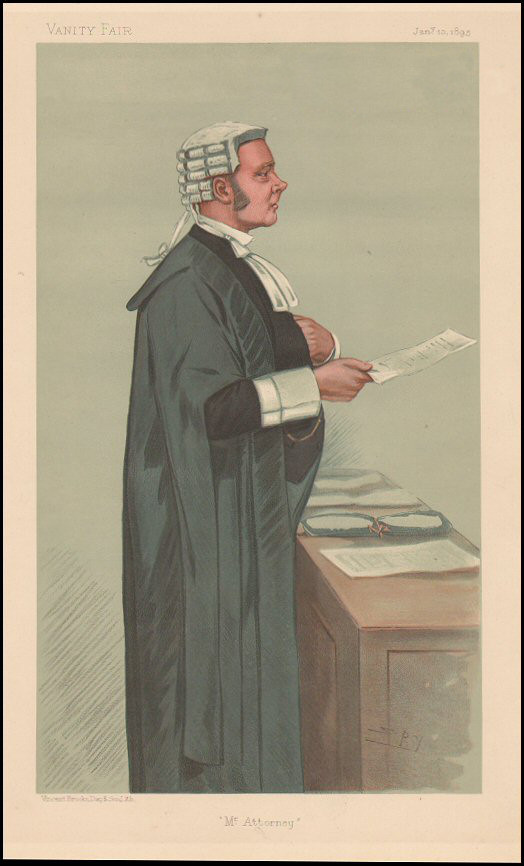
Caricature by Spy in Vanity Fair, 1895

During the 1900s and 1910s, many Liberal politicians took up the ideology of Liberal Imperialism, led by the Chancellor of the Exchequer (H. H. Asquith), the Secretary of State for War (Richard Haldane) and the Secretary of State for Foreign Affairs (Sir Edward Grey). This triumvirate of politicians was strongly in favour of an entente with France, along with the creation of a British Expeditionary Force, in the event of a war between France and Germany. These three politicians made their views known, and when Campbell-Bannerman appointed his cabinet, he appointed Loreburn Lord Chancellor as a counter to the Liberal Imperialists. Winston Churchill referred to him as belonging to the "radical element" within the Liberal Party.

In 1908, Asquith became prime minister. Lord Loreburn's disagreements with Haldane, Grey, Asquith, and eventually David Lloyd George became more prominent. Asquith, Lloyd George, Grey, Churchill, and Haldane met secretly on 23 August 1911, and when certain Cabinet members found out, they were furious. Reginald McKenna had recently been deprived of his position as First Lord of the Admiralty for refusing to provide military aid to the French, and he led the majority (whose members included Loreburn, McKenna, Colonial Secretary Lewis Vernon Harcourt, and Chancellor of the Duchy of Lancaster Jack Pease) in "a strong line about Cabinet supremacy over all other bodies in the matter of sea and land defence". Lord Esher wrote, "There has been a serious crisis. Fifteen members of the Cabinet against five. The Entente is decidedly imperilled."

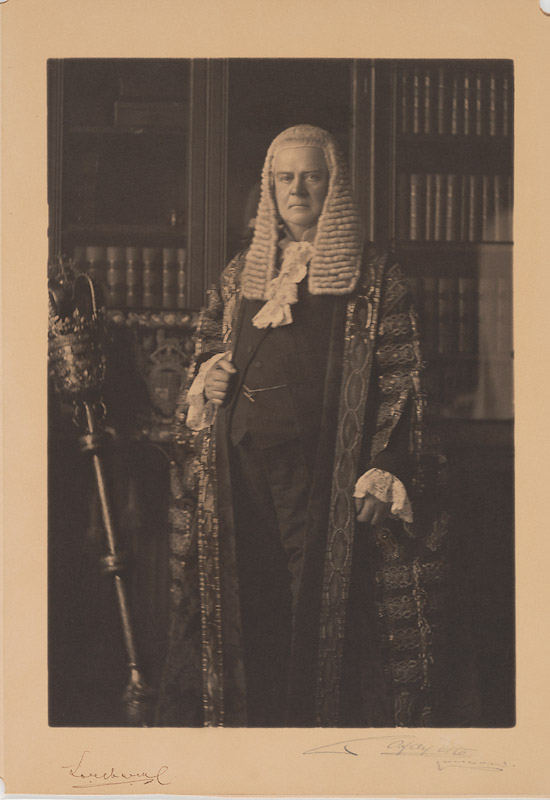
Earl Loreburn

He was created Earl Loreburn on 4 July 1911. Unfortunately, Lord Loreburn's health began declining, and in the summer of 1912, he resigned his Lord Chancellorship. In a parting, "valedictory" letter to Lord Haldane, he wrote:

My differences with you have always been this, you have been an Imperialist "au fond" and always in my opinion it is quite impossible to reconcile Imperialism with the Liberal creed which we professed, and on the force of which we received the support of the country. In this way we became hopelessly estranged on the greatest of all issues.

During the July Crisis Loreburn opposed British intervention in the impending continental war. On 31 July 1914 the Manchester Guardian, to his delight, attacked the way in which Britain appeared to have been secretly committed to the side of France and Russia.

In January 1918, the House of Lords came to consider the Bill which went on to become the Representation of the People Act 1918, for the first time introducing a limited women's suffrage. Loreburn moved an amendment to delete from the Bill the sections which would give the vote to women, but the Lords were not persuaded and on a division the amendment was lost by 134 votes against to 71 in favour.

He continued to serve as a Law Lord in the House of Lords.

== Personal life ==
Lord Loreburn married firstly Emily, daughter of A. C. Fleming, in 1871. After her death in August 1904 he married secondly Violet Elizabeth, daughter of William Frederick Hicks-Beach, in 1907. There were no children from either marriage. Lord Loreburn died on 30 November 1923, aged 77, at which his titles became extinct.

== Arms ==
Coat of arms of Robert Reid, 1st Earl Loreburn
Crest A cubit arm holding a book leaves expanded Proper. Escutcheon Azure a lion rampant Argent on a chief engrailed Or a book expanded Proper between two keys in saltire Gules and two swords in saltire of the last. Supporters On either side a collie dog Proper. Motto Pro Virtute

Parliament of the United Kingdom
Preceded by George Arbuthnot; Evan Pateshall	Member of Parliament for Hereford; 2-seat constituency until 1885; 1880–1885; With: Joseph Pulley	Succeeded by Joseph Pulley
Preceded by Ernest Noel	Member of Parliament for Dumfries Burghs; 1886–1905	Succeeded by John Gulland
Legal offices
Preceded by Sir John Rigby	Solicitor General; 1894	Succeeded by Sir Frank Lockwood
Preceded by Sir John Rigby	Attorney General; 1894–1895	Succeeded by Sir Richard Webster
Political offices
Preceded by The Earl of Halsbury	Lord High Chancellor of Great Britain; 1905–1912	Succeeded by The Lord Haldane
Peerage of the United Kingdom
New creation	Earl Loreburn; 1911–1923	Extinct
New creation	Baron Loreburn; 1906–1923	Extinct
