= John Wilton (MP) =

English politician

John Wilton (fl. 1414–1417) of Hereford was an English politician.

He was a member (MP) of the parliament of England for Hereford in April 1414 and 1417.
