= Joseph Pulley =

English politician

Member of Parliament for Hereford
- In office 1880-1886 Serving with Robert Reid

Personal details
- Born: 8 September 1822
- Died: 5 August 1901
- Party: Liberal
- Spouse: Mary Jane Burgess (m. 1860)

Escutcheon of the Pulley baronets

Sir Joseph Pulley, 1st Baronet, DL (8 September 1822 – 5 August 1901), was an English Liberal politician.

== Biography ==
Pulley was the son of Joseph Pulley of Bayswater and his wife Fanny Oldaker. He was a J. P. and Deputy Lieutenant for Herefordshire.

Pulley stood unsuccessfully for parliament at Hereford in 1874 and 1878 and was elected Member of Parliament for the constituency in 1880. He held the seat until 1886.

Pulley was created baronet of Lower Eaton, Hereford, on 4 July 1893. He died at the age of 78 without issue and the baronetcy became extinct.

He married Mary Jane Burgess in 1860, but they had no children. Pulley's sister Letitia married Thomas A. Oldaker, an estate agent, and in 1902 their daughter Emma Maud Oldaker married Captain William Davies, with many descendants.

Parliament of the United Kingdom
| Preceded by George Arbuthnot; George Clive | Member of Parliament for Hereford; 1880–1886; With: Robert Reid | Succeeded by Sir Joseph Bailey |
Baronetage of the United Kingdom
| New creation | Baronet (of Lower Eaton and Piccadilly); 1893–1901 | Extinct |
| Preceded by Joicey baronets | Pulley baronets of Lower Eaton and Piccadilly; 4 July 1893 | Succeeded by Hart baronets |
