= Edmund Weaver (MP) =

English politician

Arms of Weaver, adopted c. 1370: Quarterly, 1&4: Or on a fess Azure cotised Gules two garbs Or. 2: Azure on a bend cotised Argent three escallops Gules (Bohun). 3: Sable a lion rampant double-queued Argent (Wastneys)

Edmund Weaver (2 February 1610 – March 1672) was an English politician who sat in the House of Commons at various times between 1646 and 1660.

Weaver was the son of Richard Weaver (MP) of the Above Eign, Hereford and his wife Katherine Fox. He matriculated at Oriel College, Oxford on 20 June 1628 aged 17. He was then a student at the Inner Temple and qualified as a barrister in 1637. His father died in 1642.

In 1646, Weaver was elected Member of Parliament for Hereford as a recruiter to the Long Parliament. He withdrew in the aftermath of Pride's Purge in 1648, refusing to take part in the Rump Parliament. He returned to the Restored Rump Parliament in December 1659.

Weaver died in 1672 at the age of 62.

Weaver married Mary Elton in 1633. His daughter Margaret married Griffith Jones, MP for Radnor.
