= Thomas Buryton =

14th-century English politician

Thomas Buryton (fl. 1383–1399) of Hereford, was an English politician.

He was a member (MP) of the parliament of England for Hereford in February 1383, 1391, 1393, September 1397 and 1399.
