= 1956 Hereford by-election =

UK Parliamentary by-election

The 1956 Hereford by-election of 14 February 1956 was held after the resignation of Conservative Member of Parliament (MP) Jim Thomas.

The seat was safe, having been won by Thomas at the 1955 United Kingdom general election albeit with a reduced majority of over 2,000 votes. The Liberals, who had already polled nearly one-quarter of the vote in 1955, increased their share to 36.4%.

== Candidates ==
- David Gibson-Watt was the Conservative candidate to hold the seat. He had served in the Welsh Guards and was a former local councillor.
- Frank Owen: A local man who had served in his youth as the Liberal MP for Hereford between 1929 and 1931. At the 1955 general election, he had contested the seat for the first time since losing it in 1931, and polled a good second place.
- Labour candidate Bryan Stanley was, at the time, a technical engineer and member of the Labour National Executive Committee.

== Result of the previous general election ==
General election 1955: Hereford
Party	Candidate	Votes	%	±%
Conservative	James Thomas	18,058	51.79	
Liberal	Frank Owen	8,658	24.83	
Labour	E.L.P. Seers	8,154	23.38	
Majority		9,400	26.96	
Turnout		34,870		
Conservative hold		Swing		

== Result of the by-election ==
The Conservative Party held the seat with a reduced majority.

Hereford by-election, 14 February 1956
Party	Candidate	Votes	%	±%
Conservative	David Gibson-Watt	12,129	44.29	−7.50
Liberal	Frank Owen	9,979	36.44	+11.61
Labour	Bryan Stanley	5,277	19.27	−4.11
Majority		2,150	7.85	−19.11
Turnout		27,385		
Conservative hold		Swing		
