= John Wych =

English politician

John Wych (fl. 1384–1393) of Hereford was an English politician.

== Family ==
He was married and had two sons.

== Career ==
He was a member (MP) of the parliament of England for Hereford in November 1384, 1385, 1386, January 1390 and 1393.
