= William Pulsford =

British merchant and landowner

William Pulsford (1772–1833), the elder, was a London merchant and a plantation owner in Jamaica. He became a landowner in several English counties.

== Career ==
He was in business with his father, Robert Pulsford the elder (died 1835). In the 1790s they became partners with Thomas Latham (1744–1818). The Pulsford family firm, trading as R. & W. Pulsford, were wine merchants, of Great St Helens, London. As Latham & Pulsford, they became slave-owning West India merchants. They connected to American dealings with Caribbean plantations through David Lenox (1753–1828) of Philadelphia.

== Later life ==
In 1821, Pulsford bought the manor of Linslade in Buckinghamshire. He died on 17 December 1833, leaving £250,000.

== Family ==
Pulsford married in 1805 Martha Hobson, daughter of William Hobson of Tottenham. Their children included:

- Anne (1807–1889), married in 1832 Sir William Hayter, 1st Baronet, and was the mother of Arthur Hayter, 1st Baron Haversham.
- Frances, married Alfred Latham
- Elizabeth
- William (1813–1879), joint owner of the Aleppo estate in Jamaica. He bought the manor of Greatworth, Northamptonshire, from William Montague Higginson, holding also Linslade.
- Robert (1814–1888), Member of Parliament for Hereford
