= John Prophet (MP died c. 1399) =

English politician

John Prophet (died c. 1399), of Hereford, was a medieval merchant and mayor, whose real identity is uncertain.

John Prophet was a clothier in Hereford. Circa 1377 he was one of twenty-five citizens appointed by Richard II as Custodians of the city with full powers as Commissioners of Array to marshall the town's defences. From 1385 onwards he was regularly employed to witness deeds. He was entitled to amortize messuages by royal licence to sponsor a chapel chantry for the Holy Rood in All Saints Church in the centre of the city to pray for the souls of their ancestors.

What is confusing is that the King's Secretary was also Master John Prophet, Dean of Hereford, so that on his appointment there arose a conflict of interest with the civic offices of the town's alnagers. This may explain the dean's mugging in church lane, and possibly Master Prophet's decision to seek preferment elsewhere. Permission had to be obtained both from the king and the bishop, which was not completed until June 1391. It seems that in 1391 he travelled to the west midlands with seven other deputies on behalf of the chief alnager of England, William Hervy, and was holding the office of an alnager when returned a burgess Member of the Parliament of England for Hereford in 1391.

Then he was made Mayor of Hereford for 1392–93. There is apparently a brass monumental inscription over a south transept door reading "here lies John Prophet, once a Mayor of Hereford". Although it is clear that he was probably different man from the Dean, it is uncertain if he was ever made mayor in 1391, but was an MP.
