= William Breinton =

English politician

William Breinton (died 1403/4), of Hereford, was an English politician.

== Family ==
Breinton married a woman named Joan, and they had at least one child, the MP, George Breinton.

== Career ==
He was a member (MP) of the parliament of England for Hereford in October 1382 and September 1388.
