= Paul Keetch =

British politician (1961–2017)

- Official portrait, 2005

Member of Parliament for Hereford
- In office 1 May 1997 – 12 April 2010
- Preceded by: Sir Colin Shepherd
- Succeeded by: Jesse Norman^{[nb]}

Personal details
- Born: Paul Stuart Keetch; 21 May 1961 Hereford, England
- Died: 24 May 2017 (aged 56) London, England
- Party: Liberal Democrats (after 1988); Liberal (before 1988)
- Spouse: Claire Elizabeth Baker (m. 1991; div. 2011)
- Children: 1
- Education: Hereford Sixth Form College
- Profession: Lobbyist
- Website: Official website
- n.b. for Hereford and South Herefordshire

Paul Stuart Keetch (21 May 1961 – 24 May 2017) was a British Liberal Democrat politician and lobbyist who served as Member of Parliament (MP) for Hereford from 1997 to 2010.

== Early life ==
He went to Hereford High School for Boys (now Aylestone Business and Enterprise College), followed by Hereford Sixth Form College. Keetch joined the Liberal Party while still at school, and chaired the Hereford Young Liberals and the West Midlands Region Young Liberals, as well as being the election agent for the Liberals in Hereford in 1983. He was elected to Hereford City Council in 1983 at the age of 21, making him the then-youngest city councillor in the UK, and served two years before resigning to move to London. His first jobs were in banking and financial services, before moving to the water hygiene industry and Franklin Hodge self-assembly water tanks. He moved to London for Hodge in 1985, but soon left to become a self-employed public affairs consultant.

== Political career ==
Keetch was selected as Lib Dem candidate for Hereford in 1994 and was elected to be the city's MP at the 1997 general election. He was a junior Liberal Democrat spokesman for Foreign Affairs from 1999 to 2001, a frontbench spokesman on Defence from October 1999 until the May 2005 general election, and a junior party Whip until 2010.

In July 2005, Keetch succeeded Sharon Bowles MEP as Chair of the Liberal International British Group. He also sat on the Foreign Affairs Select Committee. He founded the Cider All-Party Parliamentary Group. He served for a year as an honorary lieutenant commander in the Royal Navy as part of the Armed Forces Parliamentary Scheme and on the NATO Parliamentary Assembly for five years.

Keetch had comfortably captured his traditionally marginal seat by 6,648 votes when he gained it from the Conservatives in 1997, but his majority dropped to 968 votes when he was re-elected in 2001, and when he won a third term in 2005 it was by 962 votes. Keetch did not stand for re-election at the 2010 general election.

== Expenses and rule breaches ==
In 2008, The Daily Telegraph stated that Keetch "never knowingly underspent", and it mocked his "expense-fuelled forays to John Lewis", including "such indispensable items as a cheese grater, three large bottle stoppers and a white pudding basin." During the 2009 United Kingdom parliamentary expenses scandal, the Hereford Times noted that in the past year he had claimed £142,385, including £87,000 on staffing costs (part of which would have gone to his wife, who worked for him), and £23,351.74 in second home allowances (the maximum permitted at the time). Keetch missed 9 out of 10 parliamentary votes on MPs' expenses. The Daily Telegraph recorded that his "mortgage jumped from £145,000 to £300,000 when he sold a flat in Stockwell in London last year and moved around the corner. The new flat was furnished with a sofa-bed costing £690 and a wardrobe at £624."

In March 2010, a BBC investigation showed that Keetch had breached House of Commons rules relating to declaring outside interests. In 2005, he twice visited Gibraltar, firstly paid for by the Liberal Party of Gibraltar and secondly paid for by the Gibraltar government, yet when he asked two parliamentary questions and signed three Early Day Motions relating to Gibraltar, he failed to declare either of these interests. Similarly, he visited South Korea in 2006 paid for by the government, but failed to declare this when he subsequently signed an Early Day Motion on North Korea.

== Personal life ==
Keetch married Claire Elizabeth Baker on 21 December 1991 and they had one son. She worked for her husband as a constituency case worker. They divorced in 2011.

On 8 July 2007, he was taken seriously ill whilst travelling to the United States on a flight. The pilot turned the aeroplane back to London and he was admitted to London Chest Hospital. Doctors eventually diagnosed him with idiopathic ventricular fibrillation and fitted an implantable cardioverter-defibrillator.

On 13 November 2009, The Sun printed front-page photos of the married MP kissing the estranged wife of SAS soldier and author Cameron Spence, with the pair staying overnight in Keetch's flat and subsequently emerging at 10:30am the next day, 11 November. Keetch's first wife divorced him just over a year later.

== Post-parliamentary career ==
After leaving parliament in 2010, Keetch resumed work as a lobbyist, initially working alone. In 2011 he became a founding partner in Wellington Street Partners with retired Conservative MP Sir Sydney Chapman and expelled Labour MP Phil Woolas. Keetch resigned from the partnership in 2013 and resumed independent practice.

On 7 March 2016, Keetch announced he would be campaigning to leave the European Union in the 23 June EU referendum. He fronted the "Liberal Leave" organisation and was the most prominent Liberal Democrat to endorse a Leave vote.

After a short illness, Keetch died on 24 May 2017, at the age of 56.

Parliament of the United Kingdom
Preceded by Sir Colin Shepherd	Member of Parliament for Hereford; 1997–2010	Succeeded by Jesse Norman
