= John Kerry (MP) =

English politician (floruit 1550s)

John Kerry (fl. 1550s) was an English politician.

He was a member (MP) of the parliament of England for Hereford in 1559. He was Mayor of Hereford in 1555–56.
