= James Thomas, 1st Viscount Cilcennin =

British Conservative politician

The Right Honourable The Viscount Cilcennin KStJ PC
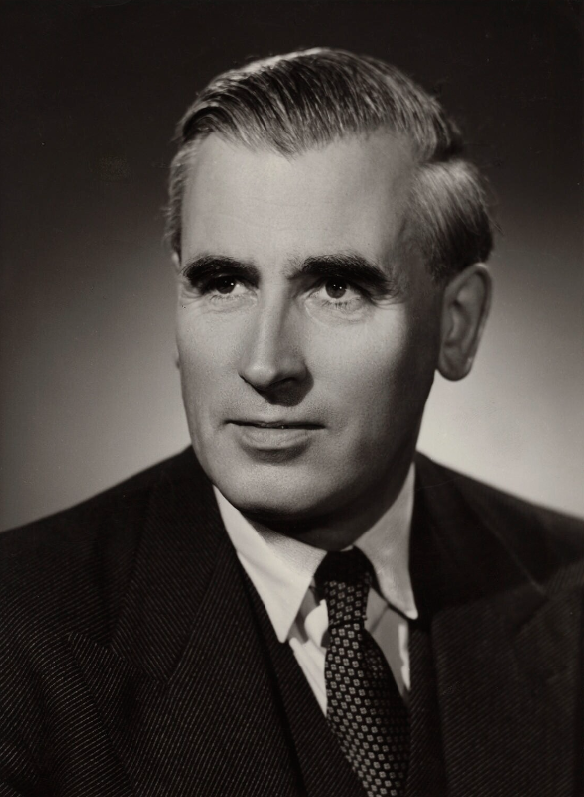
- Thomas in 1949

First Lord of the Admiralty
- In office 31 October 1951 – 2 September 1956
- Monarchs: George VI; Elizabeth II
- Prime Minister: Winston Churchill; Sir Anthony Eden
- Preceded by: The Lord Pakenham
- Succeeded by: The Viscount Hailsham

Personal details
- Born: 13 October 1903
- Died: 13 July 1960 (aged 56)
- Party: Conservative
- Education: Oriel College, Oxford

James Purdon Lewes Thomas, 1st Viscount Cilcennin, KStJ, PC (pronounced "Kilkennin"; 13 October 1903 – 13 July 1960), sometimes known as Jim Thomas, was a British Conservative politician. He served as First Lord of the Admiralty between 1951 and 1956.

== Background and education ==
James Purdon Lewes Thomas was the son of John Lewes Thomas, JP, of Cae-glas, Llandeilo, Carmarthenshire, and Anne Louisa, daughter of Commander George Purdon RN of Tinerana House, County Clare and Anne Caulfield. He was educated at Rugby and Oriel College, Oxford, where he was awarded an aegrotat degree in French in 1926 (indicating that he was unable to sit the final examinations due to ill-health).

== Political career ==
Thomas was private secretary to Stanley Baldwin, the leader of the Conservative Party, between 1929 and 1931. In the 1929 general election he stood for election as Member of Parliament for Llanelly (now Llanelli), but was unsuccessful. In the 1931 general election he was elected as Member of Parliament for Hereford, which he held until 1955. He was Parliamentary Private Secretary (PPS) to the Dominions Secretary, James Henry Thomas, between 1932 and 1935, to the Colonial Secretary, Thomas and from 1936 William Ormsby-Gore, between 1935 and 1937, and to the Foreign Secretary, Anthony Eden, between 1937 and Eden's resignation in 1938.

Thomas volunteered for military service at the outbreak of the Second World War in 1939, but was rejected due to a permanent knee injury. From 1940 to 1943 he was a government whip. In 1943 Churchill appointed Thomas Financial Secretary to the Admiralty, which he remained until 1945.

After the 1945 general election Thomas was the opposition spokesman on naval affairs and deputy chairman of the Conservative Party, where he was responsible for recommending parliamentary candidates.

When Churchill returned as Prime Minister following the 1951 general election, Thomas was sworn of the Privy Council and appointed First Lord of the Admiralty. He left the House of Commons in 1955 and was raised to the peerage as Viscount Cilcennin, of Hereford in the County of Hereford, in early 1956 (the title was pronounced "Kilkennin"). He continued as First Lord of the Admiralty until September 1956, when he resigned.

After resigning as First Lord of the Admiralty, Lord Cilcennin accompanied the Duke of Edinburgh on a world tour in 1956 and 1957, during which the duke opened the 1956 Summer Olympics in Melbourne.

In 1957 he was appointed Lord-Lieutenant of Herefordshire, a post he held until his death three years later. In 1958 he was appointed a knight of the Order of Saint John (KStJ).

In retirement, he served on the boards of several companies and as chairman of Television Wales and the West (TWW), the commercial television contractor for South Wales and the West of England.

== Personal life ==
Lord Cilcennin never married. He died in July 1960, aged 56, when the title became extinct. He suffered from arthritis of the hip in later life.

Three months after his death his book Admiralty House, Whitehall was published, about Admiralty House which had been his official residence as First Lord of the Admiralty.

According to Chris Bryant he was gay and was a member of the Glamour Boys.

== Arms ==
Coat of arms of James Thomas, 1st Viscount Cilcennin
Crest Upon a chapeau Gules turned up Ermine an eagle displayed Azure in the beak a snake Or. Escutcheon Azure a dolphin naiant between three anchors Or. Supporters On the dexter a Hereford Bull Proper and on the sinister a dragon Gules the wings semee of portcullises chained Or. Motto Pro Aris Et Focis

Parliament of the United Kingdom
Preceded by Frank Owen	Member of Parliament for Hereford; 1931–1955	Succeeded by David Gibson-Watt
Political offices
Preceded by George Hall	Financial Secretary to the Admiralty; 1943–1945	Succeeded by John Dugdale (as Parliamentary and Financial Secretary to the Admiralty)
Preceded by The Lord Pakenham	First Lord of the Admiralty; 1951–1956	Succeeded by The Viscount Hailsham
Honorary titles
Preceded by Sir Richard Cotterell, Bt	Lord-Lieutenant of Herefordshire; 1957–1960	Succeeded by John Francis Maclean
Peerage of the United Kingdom
New title	Viscount Cilcennin; 1955–1960	Extinct
