= Roger Bosworth =

English physician and politician

Roger Bosworth also Robert (ca. 1607 – 1660) was an English physician and politician who sat in the House of Commons from 1659 to 1660.

Bosworth was from a lesser gentry family of Woolhope, Herefordshire. He studied medicine at Brasenose College, Oxford and was made Doctor Regio Beneficio on 31 January 1643 and created D.Med. on 4 March. 1643. He practiced medicine in Hereford.

In 1659, Bosworth was elected member of parliament for Hereford in the Third Protectorate Parliament. He was re-elected MP for Hereford in April 1660 for the Convention Parliament.
