= Thomas Whitefield =

English politician

Thomas Whitefield (fl. 1378–1401) was an English politician.

He was Mayor of Hereford in the period November 1383 – October 1384 and in 1393–1395. He was elected a member (MP) of the parliament of England for Hereford in 1378 and 1401.
