= Colin Shepherd =

British politician (1938–2024)

Sir Colin Shepherd

Member of Parliament for Hereford
- In office 10 October 1974 – 8 April 1997
- Preceded by: David Gibson-Watt
- Succeeded by: Paul Keetch

Personal details
- Born: 13 January 1938 Hale, Cheshire, England
- Died: 17 January 2024 (aged 86) Ganarew, Herefordshire, England
- Party: Conservative

Sir Colin Ryley Shepherd (13 January 1938 – 17 January 2024) was a British Conservative Party politician. He was MP for Hereford from October 1974 until his defeat by Liberal Democrat Paul Keetch in 1997. He took a special interest in rural issues and the Commonwealth.

== Background ==
Shepherd was born in Hale, Cheshire in 1938. He was head boy at the prestigious Oundle School and after performing his national service with the Royal Navy, he attended Gonville and Caius College, Cambridge, and McGill University in Montreal, where he served in the Royal Canadian Navy.

== Career ==
Shepherd worked for his family's company in Ross-on-Wye, where he continued to work for at least one day a week through his political career in unison with his two younger brothers

In 1974, Shepherd was elected to parliament in Hereford. He was described by The Daily Telegraph as a "generally loyal" Conservative, who took a strong interest in rural issues. He was vice chairman of the agricultural committee on two occasions.

After his defeat in 1997, he continued to work in business until 2010. He also helped consult governments in Africa and helped to elect his successor MP but one, Jesse Norman.

== Personal life ==
Shepherd was knighted in the 1996 New Year Honours and lived at Ganarew Manor, Herefordshire. He married Lady Louise Cleveland in 1966, and they had three boys.

He died at home on 17 January 2024, four days after his 86th birthday which he spent celebrating with his close family at his home in Ganarew.

== Notes ==
Parliament of the United Kingdom
Preceded by David Gibson-Watt	Member of Parliament for Hereford; 1974–1997	Succeeded by Paul Keetch
