= Richard Warnecombe =

Member of the Parliament of England

Richard Warnecombe or Warmecombe (by 1494 – 1547), of Ivington, Lugwardine and Hereford was a Member of Parliament for Hereford in 1529 and 1542 and Mayor of Hereford in 1525–6 and 1540–1.
