= Robert Biddulph (MP) =

British politician

Robert Biddulph DL JP (3 March 1801 – 28 February 1864) was a British Whig Member of Parliament.

== Family ==
Biddulph was the son of John Biddulph, of Ledbury, Herefordshire, and his wife Augusta (née Roberts). He married Elizabeth, daughter of George Palmer, of Nazeing Park, Essex, in 1830.

- Their elder son, Michael, was a banker and politician and was elevated to the peerage as Baron Biddulph in 1903.
- Second son, Sir Robert, became a General in the Army.
- Third son, Colonel John Biddulph, served in India and published several works.
- Fifth and youngest son, George Tournay Biddulph (25 May 1844 – 1929), also worked for the family banking firm; Cocks Biddulph & Co. and between 1867 and 1907 was treasurer to the House of Charity, Soho, and organiser and then treasurer of Church House, Westminster.

On 3 October 1883 George married his second cousin, Lady Sarah Wilfreda Palmer, daughter of Earl Selbourne and they lived at Douglas House, Petersham.

== Career ==
Robert Biddulph sat as Member of Parliament for Hereford between 1832 and 1837 and also served as a justice of the peace and deputy lieutenant of Herefordshire.

== Later life ==
Robert Biddulph died in February 1864, aged 62. His wife survived him by 35 years died in January 1899.

Parliament of the United Kingdom
Preceded by Viscount Eastnor; Edward Bolton Clive	Member of Parliament for Hereford; 1832–1837; With: Edward Bolton Clive	Succeeded by Edward Bolton Clive; Daniel Higford Davall Burr
