= William Hewins =

British economist and Conservative politician

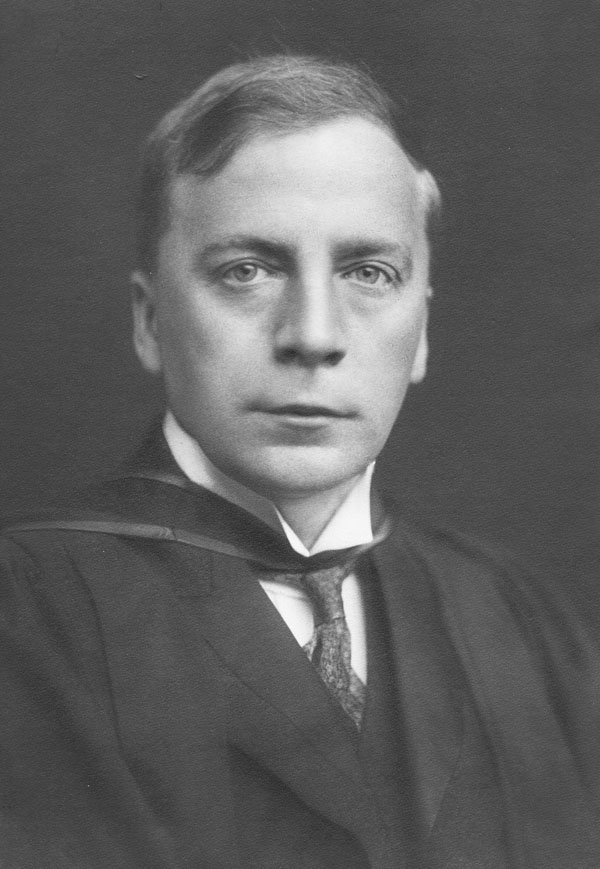
- William Hewins circa 1900
- Born: 11 May 1865
- Died: 17 November 1931 (aged 66)

Academic work
- Discipline: Economics

William Albert Samuel Hewins (11 May 1865 – 17 November 1931) was a British economist and Conservative politician. In 1895, he was appointed by Sidney Webb as the first Director of the London School of Economics, a post he held until 1903.

== Family and education ==
Hewins was the son of Samuel Hewins, an iron merchant. He was educated at Wolverhampton Grammar School and Pembroke College, University of Oxford. He graduated with a degree in mathematics and later worked as a university extension lecturer.

== Politics ==
Hewins resigned from teaching to work for Joseph Chamberlain and his campaign for tariff reform. He unsuccessfully contested Shipley in 1910 and Middleton in 1912 but was successfully returned to Parliament for Hereford in a 1912 by-election as a Liberal Unionist. He served in the coalition government of David Lloyd George as Under-Secretary of State for the Colonies from 1917 to 1919. He retired from the House of Commons before the 1918 general election.

He was invited to represent Tory opinions as a member of the Coefficients dining club of social reformers, formed by Sidney and Beatrice Webb in 1902.

In later life Hewins wrote articles for the Encyclopædia Britannica and the Dictionary of National Biography. He also published among other works Trade in Balance (1924), Empire Restored (1927), and the Apologia of an Imperialist (1929).

He died on 17 November 1931, at age 66.

== Private life ==
He married Margaret Slater in 1892 and they had three children. Their daughter was Nancy Hewins who was a theatre director. She founded the first British all-woman set of players.

Educational offices
| New office | Director of the London School of Economics; 1895–1903 | Succeeded by Halford Mackinder |
Parliament of the United Kingdom
| Preceded by John Arkwright | Member of Parliament for Hereford; 1912–1918 | Succeeded by Charles Pulley |
Political offices
| Preceded by Arthur Steel-Maitland | Under-Secretary of State for the Colonies; 1917–1919 | Succeeded by Leo Amery |
