= Henry William Hobhouse =

British Whig politician

Member of Parliament for Hereford
- In office 1 July 1841 – 5 October 1841 Serving with Edward Clive
- Preceded by: Edward Clive; Daniel Higford Davall Burr
- Succeeded by: Edward Clive; Robert Pulsford

Personal details
- Born: 8 August 1791
- Died: 22 May 1868 (aged 76)
- Party: Whig
- Spouse: Mary Anne Palmer (m. 1841)
- Children: Two, including Sir Charles Parry Hobhouse, 3rd Baronet
- Parent(s): Benjamin Hobhouse; Charlotte Cam

Henry William Hobhouse (8 August 1791 – 22 May 1868) was a British Whig politician.

Hobhouse was the son of Benjamin Hobhouse and Charlottee née Cam, daughter of Samuel Cam; and he was also a brother of John Hobhouse, 1st Baron Broughton. In 1814, he married Mary Anne Palmer, daughter of John Palmer, and they had at least two children: John Byron Hobhouse (1817–1842); and Sir Charles Parry Hobhouse, 3rd Baronet (1825–1916).

After unsuccessfully contesting Finsbury in 1835, Hobhouse was elected a Whig Member of Parliament for Hereford at the general election in May 1841 but resigned five months later by accepting the office of Steward of the Chiltern Hundreds.

He was also in the Honourable East India Company Service.

Parliament of the United Kingdom
| Preceded by Edward Clive; Daniel Higford Davall Burr | Member of Parliament for Hereford; Jul. 1841–Oct. 1841; With: Edward Clive | Succeeded by Edward Clive; Robert Pulsford |
