= Richard Ashe =

Richard Ashe may refer to:

- Richard Ashe (American football) (born 1967), American football player
- Richard Ashe, director of Track of the Moon Beast
- Richard Ashe (MP) for Trim (Parliament of Ireland constituency)

== See also ==
- Richard Ash (disambiguation)
