= John Arkwright (politician) =

British politician

John Stanhope Arkwright
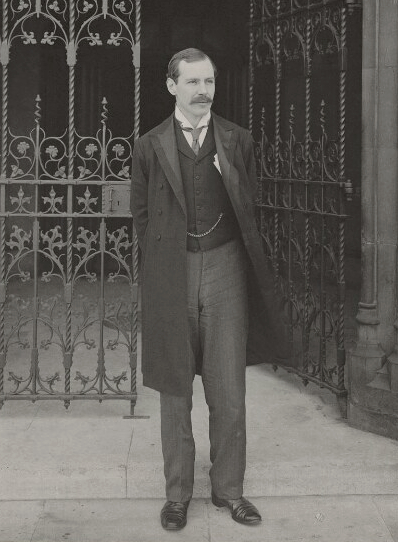
- Portrait of Arkwright in 1902
- Born: 10 July 1872
- Died: 19 September 1954 (aged 82)
- Occupation: politician

Sir John Stanhope Arkwright (10 July 1872 – 19 September 1954) was a British Conservative Party politician.

== Family life ==
Born in London, he was the great-great-grandson of the cotton-spinning industrialist Sir Richard Arkwright and the son of John Hungerford Arkwright. His uncle, Richard Arkwright, was member of parliament (MP) for Leominster. In 1910, he sold his family home, Hampton Court, near Leominster and purchased Kinsham Court.

== Career ==
At the 1900 general election he was elected as MP for Hereford, a position he served in until his resignation in 1912. In April 1902 he was appointed private secretary (unpaid) to Gerald Balfour, President of the Board of Trade.

He was the author of the hymn 'O Valiant Hearts' written to honour the war dead of World War I.

In the 1934 New Years Honours List he was knighted and in the same year was made an Honorary Freeman of the City of Hereford.

== Sources ==
- The Oxford Dictionary of National Biography (includes photo)

Parliament of the United Kingdom
Preceded by Charles Cooke	Member of Parliament for Hereford; 1900 – 1912	Succeeded by William Hewins
