= Edward Clive (died 1845) =

British politician

Edward Bolton Clive (c. 1765 – 22 July 1845) was a British Whig politician.

== Background ==
Clive was the son of George Clive and Sidney, daughter of Thomas Bolton.

== Political career ==
Clive was High Sheriff of Herefordshire in 1802 and then sat as Member of Parliament for Hereford between 1826 and 1845.

== Family ==
Clive married the Hon. Harriet, daughter of Andrew Archer, 2nd Baron Archer, in 1790. They had several children, including George Clive and Reverend Archer Clive, grandfather of Sir Robert Clive. Clive died in July 1845.

== Bibliography ==
- Leigh Rayment's Historical List of MPs

Parliament of the United Kingdom
Preceded by Viscount Eastnor; Richard Philip Scudamore	Member of Parliament for Hereford; 1826–1845; With: Viscount Eastnor 1826–1832; Robert Biddulph 1832–1837; Daniel Higford Davall Burr 1837–1841; Henry William Hobhouse 1841; Robert Pulsford 1841–1845	Succeeded by Robert Pulsford; Sir Robert Price, Bt
