= 1912 Hereford by-election =

UK Parliamentary by-election

The 1912 Hereford by-election was held on 8 March 1912. The by-election was held due to the resignation of the incumbent Conservative MP, John Arkwright. It was won by the Liberal Unionist candidate William Hewins, who was unopposed.
