= James Eyre (physician) =

Sir James Eyre M.D. (1792–1857), was an English physician and Mayor of Hereford.

In October 1811, Eyre commenced his medical education at St. Bartholomew's Hospital, where he was a pupil of John Abernethy. In 1813, seventy-five students subscribed to give the great silver cup with cover to Abernethy which is now used as a loving-cup at the annual dinner of the teachers of the medical school of St. Bartholomew's, and Eyre was chosen to present the piece of plate.

In 1814 he became a member of the College of Surgeons, and began practice in Hereford, where he attained some local celebrity; in 1830 Eyre was elected mayor (or in 1929), and was knighted in that year on the accession of William IV. George Drinkwater, mayor of Liverpool, was the only other mayor knighted, and a remark of Abernethy to a patient on these honours preserves the correct pronunciation of Eyre's name. "Go away," said Abernethy, "and have always in your thoughts the names of the mayors who have just been knighted, Eyre and Drinkwater, and you will soon recover your wind, and your shape too, I promise you."

Soon after his being knighted, Eyre decided to become a physician. After studying in Paris for a year, Eyre graduated at Edinburgh in 1834, became a member of the College of Physicians of London in 1836, and set up in practice in Lower Brook Street, London. In 1845, he published "Practical Remarks on some Exhausting Diseases, particularly those incident to Women"; and in 1852 "The Stomach and its Difficulties". Both books advocate the use of oxide of silver as a remedy for several gastric disorders. They are addressed to patients rather than to physicians, contain many trivial anecdotes, and no scientific observations.

After practicing with no great success for several years, Eyre retired to Brompton, and died suddenly while visiting a friend at Clapham on 19 June 1857. He was buried at West Norwood Cemetery.
