= John Troney =

English politician

John Troney (fl. 1396–1402) was an English politician.

He was Mayor of Hereford in 1396–1398 and elected a member (MP) of the parliament of England for Hereford in 1402.
