= Henry Morgan-Clifford =

British politician

Henry Morgan-Clifford (1806 – 12 February 1884) was a British Liberal Party politician.

He was elected unopposed at the 1847 general election as one of the two Member of Parliament (MPs) for the city of Hereford. He was re-elected in three further general elections (unopposed in 1857 and 1859), but was defeated at the 1865 general election.

At the 1868 general election he stood in the two-seat Monmouthshire county constituency, a county where owned he a large house called Llantilio Court, at Llantilio Crossenny, near Abergavenny, having inherited it in 1847 from a cousin. However, Monmouthshire had been a solidly Conservative seat since 1841, and in the constituency's first contested election since the Reform Act 1832, Morgan-Clifford came a poor third behind the two Conservative candidates.

Morgan-Clifford's heir and only surviving child was his daughter Marion, who married James Fitzwalter Butler (1839–1899), the 15th and 25th Baron Dunboyne. In 1860 they changed their surname by royal licence to Clifford-Butler.

== Works ==
- Reminiscences of His Life by Colonel Morgan-clifford, 1806-1863. ISBN 978-0-559-55169-7

Parliament of the United Kingdom
Preceded by Robert Pulsford; Sir Robert Price, Bt	Member of Parliament for Hereford; 1847 – 1865; With: Sir Robert Price, Bt to 1857; George Clive from 1857	Succeeded by Richard Baggallay; George Clive
