= George Breinton =

English politician

George Breinton (fl. 1413–1425) was an English politician.

== Family ==
George Breinton was the son of the MP, William Breinton. He married a woman named Agnes at some point before November 1424. It is thought that the MP Thomas Breinton, was their son.

== Career ==
He was Mayor of Hereford in 1430–4. He was a member (MP) of the parliament of England for Hereford in May 1413, November 1414, March 1416, 1422, 1423 and 1425.
