= O Valiant Hearts =

Christian hymn on World War I

- Genre: Hymn
- Written: 1925
- Text: John Stanhope Arkwright
- Meter: 10.10.10.10
- Melody: "Harris/The Supreme Sacrifice" by Charles Harris, "Birmingham" by Francis Cunningham, "Farley Castle" by Henry Lawes, "Valour" arranged by Ralph Vaughan Williams, "Valiant Hearts" by Gustav Holst

O Valiant Hearts to the tune

"O Valiant Hearts" is a hymn remembering the fallen of the First World War. It often features prominently in annual Remembrance Day services in the United Kingdom and the British Commonwealth.

Words were taken from a poem by Sir John Stanhope Arkwright (1872–1954), published in The Supreme Sacrifice, and other Poems in Time of War (1919).

It was set to music by Charles Harris (1865–1936) who was vicar of Colwall, Herefordshire between 1909 and 1929. It is to his tune, referred to as Harris or sometimes The Supreme Sacrifice that the hymn is now almost always sung.

== Other tunes ==
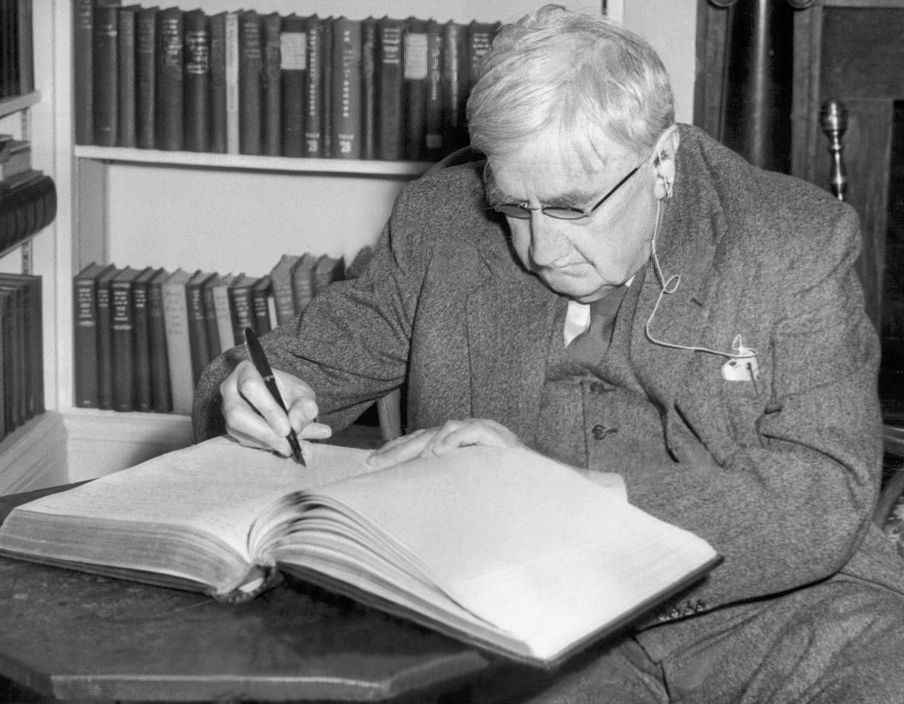
Ralph Vaughan Williams, 1954

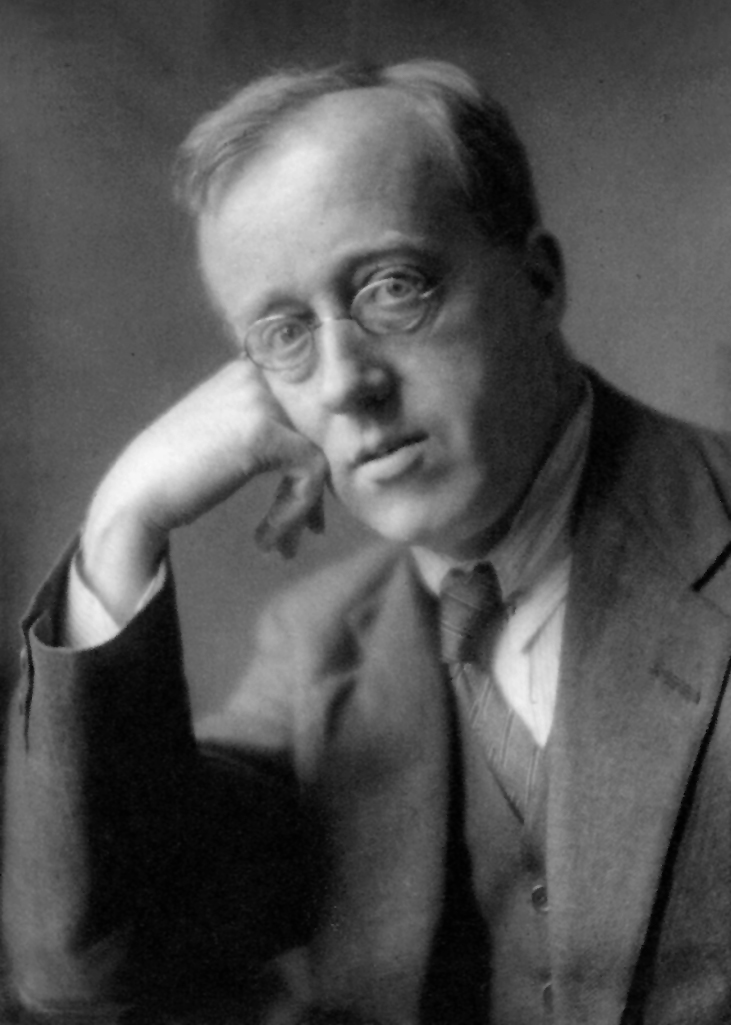
Gustav Holst

Existing tunes used for the hymn include "Birmingham", a Victorian tune by Francis Cunningham and Farley Castle by Henry Lawes (1596–1662).

The poem was later included as a hymn in both editions of the hymn book Songs of Praise. For the first edition, published in 1925, the music was set to a traditional tune, 'Valour', arranged by Ralph Vaughan Williams. In the second, larger edition of Songs of Praise, published in 1931, Gustav Holst composed the tune 'Valiant Hearts' especially for the hymn.

In Songs of Praise Discussed, Valiant Hearts is described as 'a good bold tune, in triple time, with a suggestion of bell-chimes in the repeated first phrase, an effect which is enhanced by the nature of the accompaniment to the alternative unison version'. The alternative unison version referred to is written for verses 3 and 7.

== Lyrics ==
O valiant hearts who to your glory came
Through dust of conflict and through battle flame;
Tranquil you lie, your knightly virtue proved,
Your memory hallowed in the land you loved.

Proudly you gathered, rank on rank, to war
As who had heard God’s message from afar;
All you had hoped for, all you had, you gave,
To save mankind—yourselves you scorned to save.

Splendid you passed, the great surrender made;
Into the light that nevermore shall fade;
Deep your contentment in that blest abode,
Who wait the last clear trumpet call of God.

Long years ago, as earth lay dark and still,
Rose a loud cry upon a lonely hill,
While in the frailty of our human clay,
Christ, our Redeemer, passed the self same way.

Still stands His Cross from that dread hour to this,
Like some bright star above the dark abyss;
Still, through the veil, the Victor’s pitying eyes
Look down to bless our lesser Calvaries.

These were His servants, in His steps they trod,
Following through death the martyred Son of God:
Victor, He rose; victorious too shall rise
They who have drunk His cup of sacrifice.

O risen Lord, O Shepherd of our dead,
Whose cross has bought them and Whose staff has led,
In glorious hope their proud and sorrowing land
Commits her children to Thy gracious hand.
