= William Jonet =

English politician

William Jonet (fl. 1381–1388), of Hereford and 'Hulle' near Clifford, Herefordshire, was an English politician.

He was a member (MP) of the parliament of England for Hereford in 1381, February 1388 and September 1388.
