= John Warden (MP) =

English politician

John Warden (died 1628), of Widemarsh Street, Hereford, was an English politician and Member of Parliament.

== Life ==
In c. 1580 he inherited his father's estate, and took on the obligation to pay an annuity of £10 to his mother in lieu of a jointure. by c. 1620, he claimed to have a net worth of £3,000.

He was Mayor of Hereford between 1604 and 1605. He was returned (elected) as MP for Hereford at a by-election in 1610 during the final session of the first Jacobean Parliament and re-elected in 1614. On neither occasion did he participate either as a committeeman or debater. He was named as an alderman in 1619, and as an ex-officio magistrate in 1620. He served as a commissioner for the Forced Loan in 1626–27 as part of his civic office. He died shortly before June 1628. His widow survived him by 20 years.
