= David Gibson-Watt, Baron Gibson-Watt =

British politician

The Right Honourable The Lord Gibson-Watt MC & Two Bars PC

Member of Parliament for Hereford
- In office 14 February 1956 – 10 October 1974
- Preceded by: James Thomas
- Succeeded by: Colin Shepherd

Member of the House of Lords
- Lord Temporal
- Life peerage 7 September 1979 – 7 February 2002

Personal details
- Born: 11 September 1918
- Died: 7 February 2002 (aged 83)
- Party: Conservative
- Relations: Charles Jocelyn Hambro (father-in-law); Patricia Hewitt (daughter-in-law)

James David Gibson-Watt, Baron Gibson-Watt MC & Two Bars PC (11 September 1918 – 7 February 2002) was a British Conservative Party politician.

Educated at Eton College and Trinity College, Cambridge, Gibson-Watt served in the Welsh Guards from 1939 to 1946, seeing action in the North African campaign and the Italian campaign. He was awarded the Military Cross in 1943, later gaining two bars. A farmer and forester, he served as a Radnor County Councillor and chairman of the Livestock Export Council.

He was an unsuccessful parliamentary candidate for the Brecon and Radnor constituency in 1950 and 1951, before being elected as Member of Parliament for Hereford in February 1956. He held this seat until September 1974, when he stood down. He held office as a Lord Commissioner of the Treasury from 1959 to 1961, as an opposition spokesman on communications and broadcasting from 1965 and as Minister of State at the Welsh Office from 1970 to 1974. He was appointed a Privy Counsellor in 1974.

Gibson-Watt later held public office as a Forestry Commissioner from 1976 to 1986, as Chairman of the Council on Tribunals, 1980–86, and as a Member of the Historic Buildings Council, Wales, 1975–79. He was also Chairman of Timber Growers United Kingdom, 1987–90 (Honorary President, 1993–98), a Fellow of the Royal Agricultural Society, and President of the Royal Welsh Agricultural Society, 1976 (chairman of the council, 1976–94).

In 1979 he was created a life peer as Baron Gibson-Watt, of the Wye in the District of Radnor.

Gibson-Watt married Diana Hambro (born 1922), daughter of Sir Charles Hambro, in 1942, and their second son David Julian Gibson-Watt married Patricia Hewitt, a member of the Labour Party, who after their subsequent divorce was elected as an MP.

Parliament of the United Kingdom
Preceded by James Thomas	Member of Parliament for Hereford; 1956 – October 1974	Succeeded by Colin Shepherd
