= James Scudamore (died 1668) =

English politician

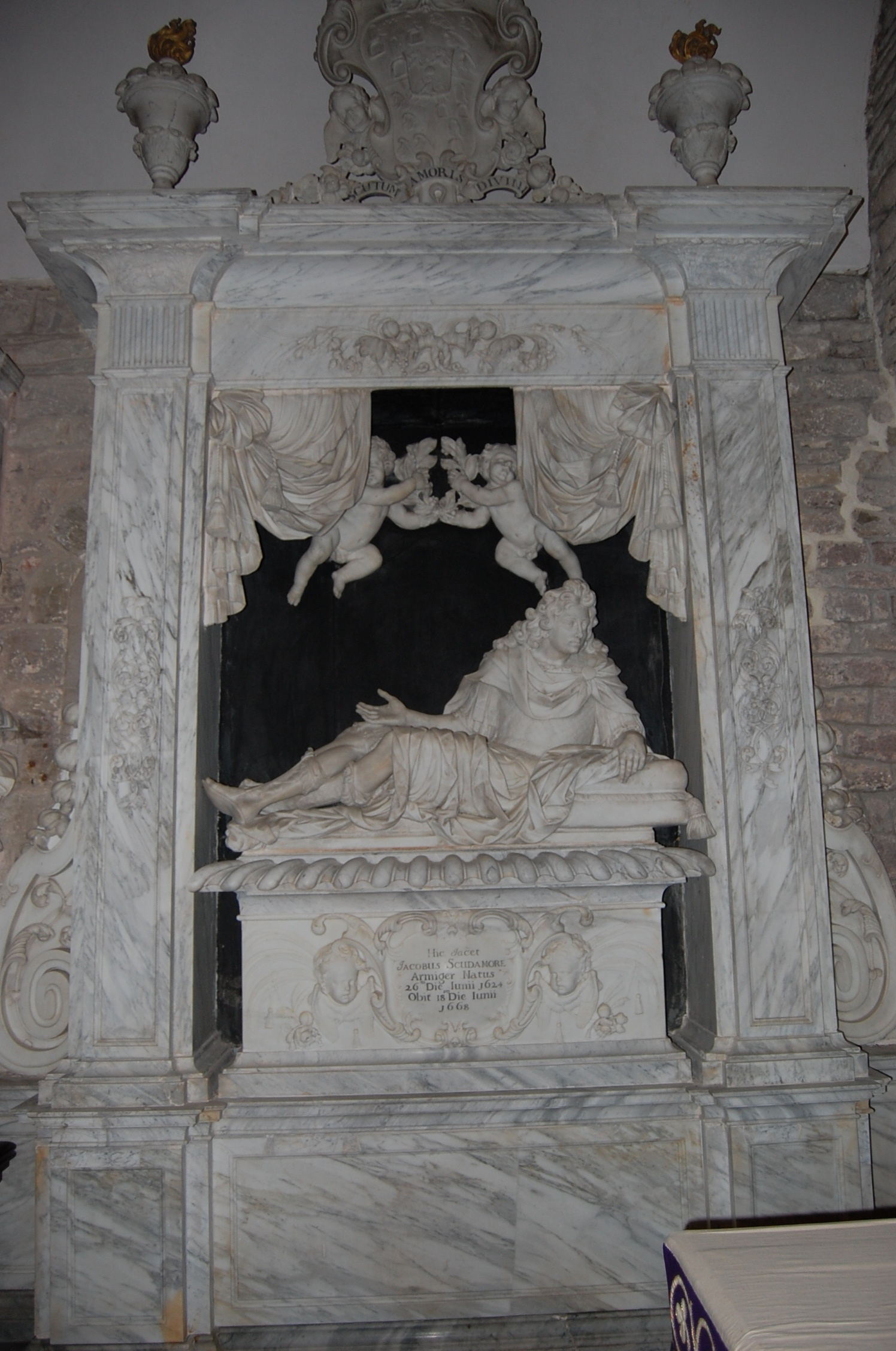
Memorial to James Scudamore (1624–1668), St Cuthbert's Church, Holme Lacy

James Scudamore (26 June 1624 – 18 June 1668) was an English politician who sat in the House of Commons at various times between 1642 and 1668.

Scudamore was the son of John Scudamore, 1st Viscount Scudamore of Holme Lacy, Herefordshire and his wife Elizabeth Porter, daughter of Sir Arthur Porter of Llanthony Abbey, Gloucestershire. He was baptised on 4 July 1624. His father was the ambassador to Paris from 1635 to 1639 and James Scudamore accompanied him there some time. Scudamore matriculated at St John's College, Oxford on 20 March 1640, aged 17 and remained there to 1642. In 1642 he was elected Member of Parliament for Hereford in a by-election to the Long Parliament and sat until he was disabled for supporting the King in 1643. He then went abroad for several years because of his gambling and other debts.

In 1661 Scudamore was elected MP Herefordshire in the Cavalier Parliament. He appears to have been a friend of John Evelyn. To him has been wrongly attributed a parody in verse entitled ‘Homer à la Mode’ (1664), which was the work of his distant kinsman, James Scudamore of Christ Church, Oxford (son of John Scudamore of Kentchurch, 1603–1669), who was drowned on 12 July 1666.

Scudamore died in his father's lifetime, in 1668, at the age of forty-four and was buried at Holme Lacy.

Scudamore married on 14 September 1648, Jane Bennet, daughter of Richard Bennet of Kew, Surrey. They had two sons and a daughter and his son John Scudamore (1650–1697) succeeded to the peerage on the death of his grandfather.
