= List of mayors of Hereford =

The office of Mayor of Hereford, a city in the west midlands of England, is now a primarily ceremonial, non-political post. As the city's First Citizen, the mayor serves as the civic representative at a wide range of functions and events throughout the local authority area.

The office of Mayor of Hereford was created by Letters Patent on 15 November 1383 by King Richard II to replace the previous office of Chief Bailiff. The Mayor's full title is "The Right Worshipful the Mayor of Hereford". The mayor is traditionally addressed as "Your worship", as a court formality.

The following have been notable mayors of Hereford:

- 1383–84 and 1393–95: Thomas Whitefield, MP for Hereford, 1378 and 1401
- 1391–92: Thomas Chippenham, MP for Hereford, 1388 and 1402
- 1396–98: John Troney
- 1398–1401:Thomas Chippenham
- 1400–04, 1412–13, 1421–23: John Falk, MP for Hereford, 1420
- 1430–34: George Breinton
- 1436–37, 1443–44: Henry Chippenham, MP for Hereford six times between 1406 and 1422
- 1543–44: William Berkeley, MP for Hereford, 1547
- 1555–56: John Kerry
- 1571–72: James Warnecombe
- 1573–74, 1576–77: Gregory Price, MP for Herefordshire and Hereford (6 times)
- 1604-5: John Warden
- 1616–17: James Rodd, MP for Hereford, 1621
- 1627–28: Richard Weaver, MP for Hereford six times between 1621 and 1640
- 1683–84: Herbert Westfaling, MP for Hereford, 1660, 1661
- 1829: James Eyre
- 1901–02: Colonel Scobie
- 1902–03: J. R. Symonds (Conservative)

== 21st century ==
- 2000–01: Richard Thomas
- 2001–02: Susan Andrews
- 2002–03: Alan Williams
- 2003–04: Wynifred Ursula Attfield
- 2004–05: Polly Andrews
- 2005–06: Marcelle Lloyd-Hayes
- 2006–07: Robert Preece
- 2007–08: Arthur Christopher Richard Chappell
- 2008–09: Kevin Wargen
- 2009–10: Sylvia P A Daniels
- 2010–11: Anna Toon
- 2011–12: Julie Woodward
- 2012–13: Brian Wilcox
- 2013–14: Phil Edwards
- 2014–15: Len Tawn
- 2015–16: Charles Nicholls
- 2016–17: Jim Kenyon
- 2017–18: Sharon Michaels
- 2018–19: Sue Boulter
- 2019–21: Katherine Dallimore-Hey
- 2021-22: Paul Stevens
- 2022-23: Mark Dykes
- 2023-24: Jacqui Carwardine
- 2024-25: Kevin Tillett
- 2025-26: Daniel Powell
