= Thomas Bromwich (MP) =

16th-century English politician

Thomas Bromwich (by 1523 – 1557 or later) was the Member of Parliament for Hereford, England, in the parliament of April 1554.
