= Richard Nash (MP) =

English politician

Richard Nash or Ash (died 1394/95), of Hereford, was an English politician.

He was a member (MP) of the parliament of England for Hereford in January 1377, 1379, January 1380, 1381 and October 1383, and for Herefordshire in November 1384, February 1388 and November 1390.
