= Robert Pulsford =

British Whig politician

Member of Parliament for Hereford
- In office 5 October 1841 – 31 July 1847 Serving with Robert Price (1845–1847); Edward Clive (1841–1845)
- Preceded by: Edward Clive; Henry William Hobhouse
- Succeeded by: Robert Price; Henry Morgan-Clifford

Personal details
- Born: 1814
- Died: 3 June 1888 (aged 73–74) Hennock, Devon, England
- Party: Whig

Robert Pulsford (1814 – 3 June 1888) was a British Whig politician.

Baptised on 21 April 1815 at Church of St John-at-Hackney, Pulsford was the son of William Pulsford and Martha, daughter of William Hobson. He died in 1888 at Hennock, Devon, leaving £192,468 to three sons and five daughters.

Pulsford was elected a Whig Member of Parliament for Hereford at a by-election in 1841—caused by the resignation of Henry William Hobhouse—and held the seat until 1847 when he did not seek re-election.

Parliament of the United Kingdom
Preceded by Edward Clive; Henry William Hobhouse	Member of Parliament for Hereford; 1841–1847; With: Robert Price (1845–1847); Edward Clive (1841–1845)	Succeeded by Robert Price; Henry Morgan-Clifford
