= Henry Catchpole (fl. 1390) =

English politician

Henry Catchpole (fl. 1390) of Hereford, was an English politician.

== Career ==
Catchpole may have been the son of the earlier MP, Henry Catchpole.

== Career ==
Catchpole was a Member (MP) of the Parliament of England for Hereford in November 1390.
