= Kylie Catchpole =

Solar energy researcher

Kylie R. Catchpole FAA FTSE
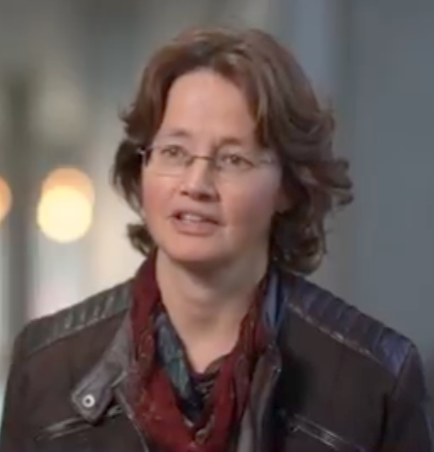
- Catchpole in 2025
- Education: Australian National University
- Occupation: Solar energy researcher
- Employer: Australian National University
- Known for: Photovoltaics
- Website: https://researchers.anu.edu.au/researchers/catchpole-kr

Kylie R. Catchpole is a solar energy researcher, who was elected a Fellow of the Australian Academy of Science in 2024. She is also a Fellow of the Australian Academy of Technological Sciences. She is a professor at the Australian National University.

== Education ==
Catchpole has an undergraduate degree in physics (hons) from ANU, and a PhD in engineering, also from ANU. She subsequently published much in physical chemistry journals, having worked at ANU since 2017 to present. In describing her early life and career path, she mentioned that:

"I have an undergraduate degree in physics. At the time I was not sure what I wanted to do with that. I thought maybe studying particle physics – I was very curious about the origins of the universe. At the same time, I wanted to do something to help the environment, but I didn’t have an idea of how I could use my interests and skills to do that. Then I discovered solar cell research. It was a perfect fit of my analytical bent and curiosity to a research field that could really make a difference to the world."

== Career ==
Catchpole is a researcher in the field of solar energy. Her work on the mechanisms of nanoscale interaction between light and semiconductors contributed to new approaches to improve light absorption in solar cells. She was involved in the development of perovskite solar cells and tandem solar cells with notable efficiencies, focusing on how ions, electrons, and device structure affect solar cell performance. She has also been involved in the creation of solar hydrogen technology, which has been recognized for its efficiency in hydrogen generation using low-cost materials.

Her work has shown that:

"include showing that the efficiency of thin solar cells can be improved using tiny metal particles, which act like antennas to direct light into the solar cell. This has opened up a range of new possibilities for reducing the cost of solar electricity."

Catchpole has many ARENA-funded projects on perovskite-silicon solar cells.

== Publications ==
Catchpole has an H number of 58, as at May 2024, and over 17,969 citations according to her Google Scholar page. Select publications are listed below:

- KR Catchpole, A Polman (2008) Plasmonic solar cells. Optics express 16 (26), 21793–21800.
- KR Catchpole, A Polman (2008) Design principles for particle plasmon enhanced solar cells. Applied Physics Letters 93 (19).

== Media ==
Catchpole has four articles published in The Conversation, on topics ranging from Net Zero, renewables, electricity costs, and solar roofs.

== Awards ==
- 2024 – Fellow of the Australian Academy of Science.
- 2022 – Fellow of the Australian Academy of Technological Sciences and Engineering.
- 2015 – John Booker Academy of Science prize for engineering.
- 2011 – Episode winner on ABC TV's New Inventors.
- 2010 – MIT Technological Review's '10 most important emerging technologies'
- 2009 – Tall Poppy – ACT.
