= Thomas Chippenham (fl. 1420–1431) =

English politician

Thomas Chippenham (fl. 1420–1431) of Hereford was an English politician.

He was Mayor of Hereford for 1420–21 and elected a member (MP) of the parliament of England for Hereford in 1420, 1426, 1429 and 1431.
