= Richard Strange (MP for Hereford) =

English dyer and politician

Richard Strange (fl. 1414–1421) was an English dyer and politician.

He was a Member (MP) of the Parliament of England for Hereford in April 1414, 1419 and May 1421.
