= James Warnecombe =

16th-century English politician

James Warnecombe or Warmecombe (by 1523 – 21 February 1581), of Ivington, Herefordshire, was an English politician.

== Family and Education ==
He was born the second son of Richard Warnecombe of Ivington, Lugwardine and Hereford and trained in law at the Inner Temple. He married twice: firstly Eleanor Hyett and secondly Mary, the daughter of John Cornwall of Burford, Shropshire. He had no legitimate children.

== Career ==
He was the Recorder for Ludlow from 1541 to 1563. He was a Member (MP) of the Parliament of England for Ludlow in November 1554, Leominster in 1555, Herefordshire in 1563, and Hereford in 1571 and 1572. He was Mayor of Hereford in 1571–72. He was appointed High Sheriff of Herefordshire for 1576–77. In 1571, Warnecombe helped defeat a bill which would have made it legal for burgesses to be elected to a constituency they did not reside in.
