= John Orchard (MP) =

English politician

John Orchard (fl. 1417) of Hereford was an English politician.

He was a member (MP) of the parliament of England for Hereford in 1417.
