= John Falk =

English politician

John Falk (died 1426), of Hereford, was an English politician.

He was born the son of cloth manufacturer Richard Falk of Hereford. He was three times Mayor of Hereford (1400–1404, 1412–13 and 1421–1423), serving as mayor for six years in all.

He was elected a member (MP) of the parliament of England for Hereford in 1420.

He was married to Katherine and had several sons, including his heir Nicholas.
