= Henry Chippenham =

English politician

Henry Chippenham (died 12 September 1451) was an English politician.

He was a grocer of Hereford, where he was made mayor for 1436–7 and 1443–4. He was the brother of Nicholas Chippenham, who was also an MP for Hereford.

He was elected a Member (MP) of the Parliament of England for Hereford in 1406, May 1413, November 1414, March 1416, December 1421 and 1422.
