= John Hoskins (poet) =

English poet and politician (1566–1638)

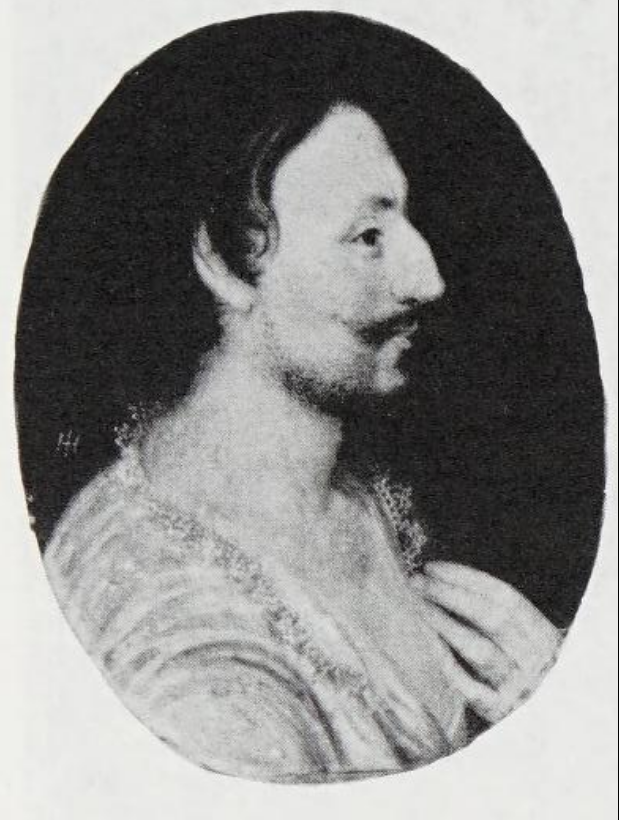
Hoskins, by the miniaturist of the same name, John Hoskins.

Serjeant John Hoskins or Hoskyns (1 March 1566 – 27 August 1638) was an English poet, scholar of Greek, lawyer, judge, and politician.

== Life ==
He was the son of John and Margery Hoskins born in Mownton-upon-Wye, Llanwarne, Herefordshire. His father, impressed by his memory and mental abilities, arranged for him to be taught Greek at the age of ten. He attended Westminster School for a year before going to Winchester College in 1579. From 1584 to 1588 he attended their sister foundation New College, Oxford, arriving alongside Henry Wotton.

Hoskins was expelled from Oxford University before he became Regent master: the authorities did not appreciate his biting satire. He became a teacher in Ilchester, Somerset, where he worked on a Greek lexicon which went as far as the letter M. Through a fortuitous meeting with Benedicta Moyle, who later became his first wife, he then gained entrance to the Middle Temple to study for the bar.

Hoskins by 1601 acquired a house in, and was elected to parliament for Hereford in 1604 and 1614. In 1614, in parliament, he spoke his mind about the Sicilian Vespers and consequently was imprisoned for a year in the Tower of London with Sir Charles Cornwallis. After his release he was elected Lent Reader in 1619, and became a Judge in 1623. He was re-elected MP for Hereford in 1628.

Hoskins was an intimate of John Selden, Sir Walter Raleigh and Ben Jonson. He fought a duel with Sir Benjamin Rudyard, but they subsequently became great friends. When he was a Serjeant-at-law, and was indicted for not keeping the pavement in front of his door in good repair, he successfully defended his case arguing that the charge did not specify how he was liable, whether he owned a property at that location, whether he lived there, or even whether he had a tenant who had legally assumed such responsibilities.

== Personal life ==
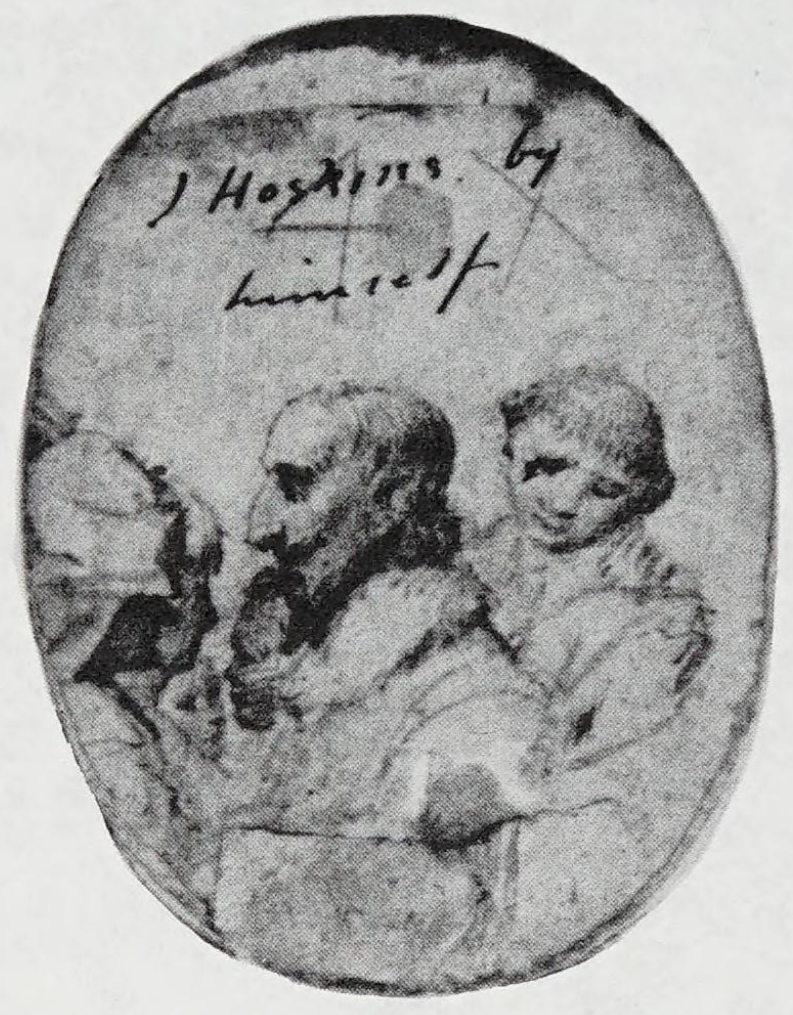
Self portrait of John Hoskins among his family, probably sketched late in July 1618. Depicted are himself, his step-son, step-daughter, and wife.

Hoskins was twice married. His first wife was Benedicta Moyle, daughter of John Moyle, of Buckwell, Kent. They met before he became a law student but did not marry until 1 August 1601, when she had in the meantime married Francis Bourne (a fellow barrister) of Sutton St Clere, Somerset, who had died in February 1601. The couple had three sons (two of whom predeceased him) and one daughter. Benedicta died on 6 October 1625. His second wife, whom he married on 10 December 1627, was Isabel, daughter of William Riseley of Chetwode, Buckinghamshire, and successively widow of Thomas Heath, of Shellswell, Oxfordshire, and of Devereux Barratt of Tenby, Pembrokeshire. The couple had no children.

== Death ==
Early in 1638, when attending assizes, "a massive country fellow trod on his toe"; gangrene set in but, despite an amputation, he died in August that year, aged 72. He is buried in Abbey Dore, Herefordshire.

His surviving son Bennet Hoskyns was created a Baronet in 1676.

== Works ==
The poem Absence, Hear thou my Protestation (Printed anonymously in Francis Davison's A poetical rhapsody containing diverse sonnets, odes, [etc.] (V. S. for J. Baily, 1602)) was at one time attributed to John Donne. Herbert Grierson has argued persuasively that it should be attributed to Hoskins.

Hoskins is noted for painting an image of The Trusty Servant as an emblem outside the kitchen of Winchester College in 1579. The emblem was accompanied by verse in both Latin and English providing a reading of the image.

== Bibliography ==
- Lee, Sidney, ed. (1891). "Hoskins, John (1566-1638)" . Dictionary of National Biography. Vol. 27. London: Smith, Elder & Co.
- "Selected Poetry of John Hoskyns (1566-1638)". Representative Poets Online. Archived from the original on 11 November 2007.
- Woolrych, Humphry William (1869). Lives of Eminent Serjeants-At-Law of the English Bar. Wm. H. Allen & Co.
