= Henry Catchpole (fl. 1361–1386) =

English politician

Henry Catchpole (fl. 1361–1386) was an English politician.

== Family ==
Catchpole was married to a woman named Margaret.

== Career ==
Catchpole was a member (MP) of the parliament of England for Hereford in 1361, 1366, 1369, 1371, 1378, October 1383 and 1386.
