= Hereford (constituency) =

Parliamentary constituency in the United Kingdom, 1885–2010

Coordinates: 52.0°N 2.7°W

- Former county constituency for the House of Commons
- Boundary of Hereford in Herefordshire

- Location of Herefordshire within England
- County: Herefordshire
- Major settlements: Hereford

1918–2010
- Seats: One
- Replaced by: Hereford and South Herefordshire, North Herefordshire

1295–1918
- Seats: 1295–1885: Two; 1885–1918: One
- Type of constituency: Borough constituency

Hereford was, until 2010, a constituency of the House of Commons of the Parliament of the United Kingdom. Since 1918, it had elected one Member of Parliament (MP) by the first-past-the-post voting system.

Previously, Hereford had been a parliamentary borough which from 1295 to 1885 had elected two MPs, using the bloc vote system in contested elections. Under the Redistribution of Seats Act 1885 the borough's representation had been reduced to one seat at the 1885 general election, and for the 1918 general election the borough was abolished and replaced with a county division which carried the same name but covered a wider geographical area.

== History ==
Hereford sent two representatives to Parliament from the beginning of the reign of Edward I. Although a county town, the early elections were always held at a different location from those of the shire, the former taking place at the Guildhall, the latter in the castle.

In 1885, representation was reduced to one Member.

Journalist Robin Day stood as the Liberal candidate in the 1959 general election.

From 1931 until 1997, Hereford was held by the Conservative Party, before being taken by Paul Keetch of the Liberal Democrats at the 1997 general election. Keetch served as the Liberal Democrats' spokesman for defence from October 1999 until May 2005, and announced on 17 November 2006 that he would not be standing at the next election.

Following the review by the Boundary Commission for England of parliamentary representation in Herefordshire, taking effect at the 2010 general election, two parliamentary constituencies were allocated to the county. The Hereford seat was abolished and replaced by the Hereford and South Herefordshire seat, while the remainder of the county is covered by the North Herefordshire seat.

=== Boundaries ===
1918–50: The Borough of Hereford, the Urban Districts of Ledbury and Ross-on-Wye, the Rural Districts of Dore, Ross, and Whitchurch, and parts of the Rural Districts of Hereford and Ledbury.

1950–83: The Borough of Hereford, the Urban District of Ross-on-Wye, the Rural Districts of Dore and Bredwardine, and Ross and Whitchurch, and part of the Rural District of Hereford.

1983–97: The City of Hereford, and the District of South Herefordshire wards of Backbury, Broad Oak, Dinedor Hill, Doward, Fownhope, Garron, Golden Valley, Gorsley, Gorsty, Harewood End, Hollington, Kingsthorne, Merbach, Olchon, Old Gore, Penyard, Pontrilas, Ross-on-Wye East, Ross-on-Wye West, Stoney Street, Tram Inn, Walford, Whitfield, and Wilton.

1997–2010: The City of Hereford, and the District of South Herefordshire wards of Broad Oak, Clehonger East, Clehonger West, Dinedor Hill, Doward, Fownhope, Garron, Golden Valley, Gorsley, Harewood End, Hollington, Kingsthorne, Merbach, Olchon, Old Gore, Penyard, Pontrilas, Ross-on-Wye East, Ross-on-Wye West, Stoney Street, Tram Inn, Walford, Whitfield, and Wilton.

In its final form, the Hereford constituency contained the city of Hereford and most of South Herefordshire, including Ross-on-Wye, but excluding Ledbury and Much Marcle, both of which were in the Leominster constituency.

== Members of Parliament ==
=== MPs 1295–1640 ===
Parliament	First member	Second member
Jan. 1377	Richard Nash	
1378	Thomas Whitefield	
1379	Richard Nash	
Jan.1380	Richard Nash	
1381	Richard Nash	
Oct. 1383	Richard Nash	
1386	John Wych	Henry Catchpole I
1388 (Feb)	William Jonet	Thomas Chippenham I
1388 (Sep)	William Jonet	William Breinton
1390 (Jan)	John Wych	James Nash
1390 (Nov)	Henry Catchpole II	James Nash
1391	Thomas Buryton	John Prophet
1393	Thomas Buryton	John Wych
1394		
1395	Hugh Wigan	William Speed
1397 (Jan)	Hugh Wigan	James Nash
1397 (Sep)	Hugh Wigan	Thomas Buryton
1399	James Nash	Thomas Buryton
1401	Hugh Wigan	Thomas Whitefield
1402	Thomas Chippenham I	John Troney
1404 (Jan)		
1404 (Oct)		
1406	Henry Chippenham	Hugh Wigan
1407	Hugh Wigan	Roger ...feld or Roger ...felde (Note: Roger ...felde: The first part of his surname is illegible in the surviving records. Nothing more is known of him, although he may have been related to Thomas Whitefield)
1410		
1411		
1413 (Feb)		
1413 (May)	Henry Chippenham	George Breinton
1414 (Apr)	John Wilton	Richard Strange
1414 (Nov)	Henry Chippenham	George Breinton
1415		
1416 (Mar)	Henry Chippenham	George Breinton
1416 (Oct)		
1417	John Wilton	John Orchard
1419	Richard Strange	John Abrahall
1420	Thomas Chippenham II	John Falk
1421 (May)	William Buryton	Richard Strange
1421 (Dec)	Henry Chippenham	Nicholas Chippenham
1426	Thomas Chippenham	
1429	Thomas Chippenham	William Buryton
1431	Thomas Chippenham	William Buryton
1432	William Buryton	
1437	William Buryton	
1510		
1512	Roland Brydges	Reginald Mynors
1515	Roland Brydges	Reginald Mynors
1523	?	
1529	Richard Warnecombe	Thomas Havard
1536	?	
1539	?	
1542	Richard Warnecombe	Thomas Havard
1545	?	
1547	Thomas Havard	William Berkeley, died and replaced Jan 1552 by John Warnecombe
1553 (Mar)	Hugh Welshe	?
1553 (Oct)	Sir John Price	Thomas Havard
1554 (Apr)	Thomas Havard	Thomas Bromwich
1554 (Nov)	William Smothye	Leonard Boldyng
1555	Hugh Gebons	Morgan Owgan
1558	Henry Dudeston	John Gibbs
1558–1559	John Kerry	Thomas Church
1562–1563	Thomas Webbe, died and replaced 1566 by John Hyde	Henry Green
1571	James Warnecombe	Thomas Church
1572 (Apr)	James Warnecombe	Gregory Price
1584	Gregory Price	James Boyle
1586 (Sep)	Gregory Price	Thomas Jones
1588	Gregory Price	Nicholas Garnons
1593	Gregory Price	Thomas Mallard
1597	Gregory Price	Anthony Pembridge
1601	Walter Hurdman	Thomas Jones
1604	Walter Hurdman	John Hoskins
1605	Anthony Pembrugge	John Hoskins
1610	John Warden	John Hoskins
1614	John Hoskins	John Warden
1621–1622	James Rodd	Richard Weaver
1624	Sir James Clerke	Richard Weaver
1625	Sir James Clerke	Richard Weaver
1626	Sir James Clerke	Richard Weaver
1628	The Viscount Scudamore	John Hoskins
1629–1640	No Parliaments summoned	

=== MPs 1640–1885 ===
Event	First member	First party	Second member	Second party
April 1640	Richard Weaver		Richard Seaborne	
November 1640	Richard Weaver	Parliamentarian	Richard Seaborne	Royalist
1642	James Scudamore	Royalist	Richard Seaborne	Royalist
May 1643	Scudamore disabled from sitting – seat vacant		Richard Seaborne	Royalist
January 1644	Scudamore disabled from sitting – seat vacant		Seaborne disabled from sitting – seat vacant	
1646	Bennet Hoskyns		Edmund Weaver	
December 1648	Hoskyns excluded in Pride's Purge – seat vacant		Edmund Weaver	
1653	Hereford was unrepresented in Barebone's Parliament			
1654	Bennet Hoskyns		Hereford had only one seat in the First and Second Parliaments of the Protectorate	
1656	Colonel Wroth Rogers		Hereford had only one seat in the First and Second Parliaments of the Protectorate	
January 1659	Nathan Rogers		Roger Bosworth	
May 1659	Not represented in the restored Rump			
April 1660	Herbert Westfaling		Roger Bosworth	
November 1660	Herbert Westfaling		Sir Henry Lingen	
April 1661	Sir Edward Hopton		Sir Henry Lingen	
September 1661	Herbert Westfaling		Sir Henry Lingen	
1662	Herbert Westfaling		Roger Vaughan	
1673	Herbert Westfaling		The Viscount Scudamore	
1679	Bridstock Harford		Paul Foley	Country Whig
1681	Herbert Aubrey		Paul Foley	Country Whig
1685	Herbert Aubrey		Thomas Geers	
January 1689	Sir William Gregory		Paul Foley	Country Whig
June 1689	Henry Cornewall		Paul Foley	Country Whig
1695	James Morgan		Paul Foley	Country Whig
1698	Hon. James Brydges		Paul Foley	Country Whig
1699	Hon. James Brydges		Samuel Pytts	
1701	Hon. James Brydges		Thomas Foley	
1715	The Viscount Scudamore		Thomas Foley	
1717	Herbert Rudhale Westfaling		Thomas Foley	
1722	Herbert Rudhale Westfaling		William Mayo	
1723	Herbert Rudhale Westfaling		James Wallwyn	
1727	Marquess of Carnarvon		Thomas Geers	
1734	Thomas Foley		Sir John Morgan	
1741	Edward Cope Hopton		Thomas Geers Winford	
1747	Lieutenant General Henry Cornewall		Daniel Leighton	
1754	Charles Fitzroy Scudamore		John Symons	Tory
1764	Charles Fitzroy Scudamore		John Scudamore	Whig
1768	(Sir) Richard Symons	Tory	John Scudamore	Whig
April 1784	Earl of Surrey	Whig	John Scudamore	Whig
July 1784	Robert Philipps	Whig	John Scudamore	Whig
1785	James Walwyn	Whig	John Scudamore	Whig
1796	James Walwyn	Whig	John Scudamore, junior	Whig
1800	Thomas Powell Symonds	Whig	John Scudamore, junior	Whig
1805	Thomas Powell Symonds	Whig	Richard Philip Scudamore	Whig
1818	Thomas Powell Symonds	Whig	Viscount Eastnor	Tory
1819	Richard Philip Scudamore	Whig	Viscount Eastnor	Tory
1826	Edward Clive	Whig	Viscount Eastnor	Tory
1832	Edward Clive	Whig	Robert Biddulph	Whig
1837	Edward Clive	Whig	Daniel Higford Davall Burr	Conservative
July 1841	Edward Clive	Whig	Henry William Hobhouse	Whig
October 1841	Edward Clive	Whig	Robert Pulsford	Whig
1845	Sir Robert Price, Bt	Whig	Robert Pulsford	Whig
1847	Sir Robert Price, Bt	Whig	Henry Morgan-Clifford	Whig
1857	George Clive	Whig	Henry Morgan-Clifford	Whig
1859	George Clive	Liberal	Henry Morgan-Clifford	Liberal
1865	George Clive	Liberal	Richard Baggallay	Conservative
1868	George Clive	Liberal	John Wyllie	Liberal
1869	Edward Clive	Liberal	Chandos Wren-Hoskyns	Liberal
1871	George Arbuthnot	Conservative	Chandos Wren-Hoskyns	Liberal
1874	Evan Pateshall	Conservative	George Clive	Liberal
1878	George Arbuthnot	Conservative	George Clive	Liberal
1880	Joseph Pulley	Liberal	Robert Reid	Liberal
1885	Representation reduced to one member			

=== MPs 1885–2010 ===
Year	Member	Party
1885	Joseph Pulley	Liberal
1886	Sir Joseph Bailey	Conservative
1892	William Grenfell	Liberal
1893	Charles Cooke	Conservative
1900	John Arkwright	Conservative
1912	William Hewins	Unionist
1918	Charles Pulley	Unionist
1921	Samuel Roberts	Unionist
1929	Frank Owen	Liberal
1931	James Thomas	Conservative
1956	David Gibson-Watt	Conservative
1974	Colin Shepherd	Conservative
1997	Paul Keetch	Liberal Democrat
2010	constituency abolished	

== Elections ==
=== Elections in the 1830s ===
General election 1830: Hereford
Party	Candidate	Votes	%
Whig	Edward Clive	Unopposed	
Tory	John Somers-Cocks	Unopposed	
Registered electors		c. 1,110	
Whig hold			
Tory hold			

General election 1831: Hereford
Party	Candidate	Votes	%
Whig	Edward Clive	Unopposed	
Tory	John Somers-Cocks	Unopposed	
Registered electors		c. 1,110	
Whig hold			
Tory hold			

General election 1832: Hereford
Party	Candidate	Votes	%
Whig	Edward Clive	392	38.5
Whig	Robert Biddulph	380	37.4
Tory	Richard Blakemore	245	24.1
Majority		135	13.3
Turnout		610	66.3
Registered electors		920	
Whig hold			
Whig gain from Tory			

General election 1835: Hereford
Party	Candidate	Votes	%	±%
Whig	Edward Clive	457	34.7	−3.8
Whig	Robert Biddulph	435	33.0	−4.4
Conservative	Richard Blakemore	426	32.3	+8.2
Majority		9	0.7	−12.6
Turnout		813	91.2	+24.9
Registered electors		891		
Whig hold		Swing	−4.0	
Whig hold		Swing	−4.3	

General election 1837: Hereford
Party	Candidate	Votes	%	±%
Whig	Edward Clive	444	34.3	−0.4
Conservative	Daniel Higford Davall Burr	430	33.2	+0.9
Whig	Robert Biddulph	420	32.5	−0.5
Turnout		816	89.8	−1.4
Registered electors		909		
Majority		14	1.1	+0.4
Whig hold		Swing	−0.4	
Majority		10	0.7	N/A
Conservative gain from Whig		Swing	+0.9	

=== Elections in the 1840s ===
General election 1841: Hereford
Party	Candidate	Votes	%	±%
Whig	Edward Clive	531	39.7	+5.4
Whig	Henry William Hobhouse	500	37.3	+4.8
Conservative	Daniel Higford Davall Burr	308	23.0	−10.2
Majority		192	14.3	+13.2
Turnout		787	81.9	−7.9
Registered electors		961		
Whig hold		Swing	+5.3	
Whig gain from Conservative		Swing	+5.0	

Hobhouse resigned by accepting the office of Steward of the Chiltern Hundreds, causing a by-election.

By-election, 5 October 1841: Hereford
Party	Candidate	Votes	%	±%
Whig	Robert Pulsford	442	59.8	▼17.2
Conservative	Edward Griffiths	297	40.2	▲17.2
Majority		145	19.6	▲5.3
Turnout		739	76.9	▼5.0
Registered electors		961		
Whig hold		Swing	▼17.2	

Clive's death caused a by-election.

By-election, 31 July 1845: Hereford
Party	Candidate	Votes	%	±%
Whig	Robert Price	Unopposed		
Whig hold				

General election 1847: Hereford
Party	Candidate	Votes	%	±%
Whig	Robert Price	Unopposed		
Whig	Henry Morgan-Clifford	Unopposed		
Registered electors		1,061		
Whig hold				
Whig hold				

=== Elections in the 1850s ===
General election 1852: Hereford
Party	Candidate	Votes	%	±%
Whig	Robert Price	458	38.1	N/A
Whig	Henry Morgan-Clifford	452	37.6	N/A
Conservative	Augustus William Henry Meyrick	292	24.3	New
Majority		160	13.3	N/A
Turnout		747 (est)	73.7 (est)	N/A
Registered electors		1,013		
Whig hold		Swing	N/A	
Whig hold		Swing	N/A	

Price resigned, causing a by-election.

By-election, 14 February 1857: Hereford
Party	Candidate	Votes	%	±%
Whig	George Clive	399	63.4	▼12.3
Conservative	William Kevill Davies	230	36.6	▲12.3
Majority		169	26.8	▲13.5
Turnout		629	75.6	▲1.9
Registered electors		832		
Whig hold		Swing	▼12.3	

General election 1857: Hereford
Party	Candidate	Votes	%	±%
Whig	George Clive	Unopposed		
Whig	Henry Morgan-Clifford	Unopposed		
Registered electors		832		
Whig hold				
Whig hold				

General election 1859: Hereford
Party	Candidate	Votes	%	±%
Liberal	George Clive	Unopposed		
Liberal	Henry Morgan-Clifford	Unopposed		
Registered electors		971		
Liberal hold				
Liberal hold				

=== Elections in the 1860s ===
General election 1865: Hereford
Party	Candidate	Votes	%	±%
Conservative	Richard Baggallay	510	34.2	New
Liberal	George Clive	499	33.4	N/A
Liberal	Henry Morgan-Clifford	483	32.4	N/A
Majority		11	0.8	N/A
Turnout		1,001 (est)	82.4 (est)	N/A
Registered electors		1,215		
Conservative gain from Liberal		Swing	N/A	
Liberal hold		Swing	N/A	

General election 1868: Hereford
Party	Candidate	Votes	%	±%
Liberal	George Clive	1,055	26.9	▼6.5
Liberal	John Wyllie	1,015	25.9	▼6.5
Conservative	Richard Baggallay	983	25.0	▲7.9
Conservative	George Arbuthnot	872	22.2	▲5.1
Majority		32	0.9	N/A
Turnout		1,963 (est)	82.5 (est)	▲0.1
Registered electors		2,380		
Liberal hold		Swing	▼5.8	
Liberal gain from Conservative		Swing	▼7.2	

The election was declared void on petition, after the Liberal agent was found to have "given breakfast to Liberal electors", and therefore was guilty of treating.

By-election, 30 March 1869: Hereford
Party	Candidate	Votes	%	±%
Liberal	Edward Clive	1,064	28.0	▲1.1
Liberal	Chandos Wren-Hoskyns	1,033	27.2	▲1.3
Conservative	Richard Baggallay	871	23.0	▼2.0
Conservative	George Arbuthnot	826	21.8	▼0.4
Majority		144	3.8	▲2.9
Turnout		1,897 (est)	79.7 (est)	▼2.8
Registered electors		2,380		
Liberal hold		Swing	▲1.6	
Liberal hold		Swing	▲0.9	

=== Elections in the 1870s ===
Clive resigned, causing a by-election.

By-election, 28 Feb 1871: Hereford
Party	Candidate	Votes	%	±%
Conservative	George Arbuthnot	946	58.3	▲11.1
Liberal	Arthur Hayter	678	41.7	▼11.1
Majority		268	16.6	N/A
Turnout		1,624	70.7	▼11.8
Registered electors		2,298		
Conservative gain from Liberal		Swing	▲11.1	

General election 1874: Hereford
Party	Candidate	Votes	%	±%
Conservative	Evan Pateshall	978	26.4	▲1.4
Liberal	George Clive	921	24.9	▼2.0
Conservative	George Arbuthnot	903	24.4	▲2.2
Liberal	Joseph Pulley	902	24.4	▼1.5
Turnout		1,852 (est)	79.1 (est)	▼3.4
Registered electors		2,340		
Majority		76	2.0	N/A
Conservative gain from Liberal		Swing	▲1.5	
Majority		18	0.5	▼0.4
Liberal hold		Swing	▼2.1	

Pateshall resigned, causing a by-election.

By-election, 14 Mar 1878: Hereford
Party	Candidate	Votes	%	±%
Conservative	George Arbuthnot	1,110	51.0	▲0.2
Liberal	Joseph Pulley	1,066	49.0	▼0.3
Majority		44	2.0	0.0
Turnout		2,176	82.7	▲3.6
Registered electors		2,631		
Conservative hold		Swing	▲0.2	

=== Elections in the 1880s ===
General election 1880: Hereford
Party	Candidate	Votes	%	±%
Liberal	Joseph Pulley	1,505	30.3	▲5.9
Liberal	Robert Reid	1,321	26.6	▲1.7
Conservative	George Arbuthnot	1,099	22.1	▼2.3
Conservative	Frederick Dixon-Hartland	1,041	21.0	▼5.4
Majority		222	4.5	▲4.0
Turnout		2,483 (est)	87.5 (est)	▲8.4
Registered electors		2,837		
Liberal hold		Swing	▲4.9	
Liberal gain from Conservative		Swing	▲2.8	

General election 1885: Hereford
Party	Candidate	Votes	%	±%
Liberal	Joseph Pulley	1,360	51.2	▼5.7
Conservative	William Henry Barneby	1,296	48.8	▲5.7
Majority		64	2.4	▼2.1
Turnout		2,656	88.5	▲1.0 (est)
Registered electors		3,002		
Liberal hold		Swing	▼5.7	

General election 1886: Hereford
Party	Candidate	Votes	%	±%
Conservative	Joseph Bailey	1,401	55.2	▲6.4
Liberal	Joseph Pulley	1,136	44.8	▼6.4
Majority		265	10.4	N/A
Turnout		2,537	84.5	▼4.0
Registered electors		3,002		
Conservative gain from Liberal		Swing	▲6.4	

=== Elections in the 1890s ===
General election 1892: Hereford
Party	Candidate	Votes	%	±%
Liberal	William Grenfell	1,507	52.2	▲7.4
Conservative	Joseph Bailey	1,380	47.8	▼7.4
Majority		127	4.4	N/A
Turnout		2,887	88.4	▲3.9
Registered electors		3,267		
Liberal gain from Conservative		Swing	▲7.4	

Grenfell resigned, causing a by-election.

1893 Hereford by-election
Party	Candidate	Votes	%	±%
Conservative	Charles Cooke	1,504	50.7	▲2.9
Liberal	Joseph Pulley	1,460	49.3	▼2.9
Majority		44	1.4	N/A
Turnout		2,964	86.8	▼1.6
Registered electors		3,415		
Conservative gain from Liberal		Swing	▲2.9	

General election 1895: Hereford
Party	Candidate	Votes	%	±%
Conservative	Charles Cooke	1,669	55.2	▲7.4
Liberal	Robert Pearce Edgcumbe	1,356	44.8	▼7.4
Majority		313	10.4	N/A
Turnout		3,025	90.9	▲2.5
Registered electors		3,328		
Conservative gain from Liberal		Swing	▲7.4	

=== Elections in the 1900s ===
General election 1900: Hereford
Party	Candidate	Votes	%	±%
Conservative	John Arkwright	Unopposed		
Conservative hold				

General election 1906: Hereford
Party	Candidate	Votes	%	±%
Conservative	John Arkwright	1,934	53.3	N/A
Liberal	Edward Lucas-Scudamore	1,692	46.7	New
Majority		242	6.6	N/A
Turnout		3,626	94.1	N/A
Registered electors		3,852		
Conservative hold		Swing	N/A	

=== Elections in the 1910s ===
General election January 1910: Hereford
Party	Candidate	Votes	%	±%
Conservative	John Arkwright	2,320	60.2	▲6.9
Liberal	Evan Lewis Thomas	1,533	39.8	▼6.9
Majority		787	20.4	▲13.8
Turnout		3,853	94.8	▲0.7
Registered electors		4,066		
Conservative hold		Swing	▲6.9	

Joseph Davies

General election December 1910: Hereford
Party	Candidate	Votes	%	±%
Conservative	John Arkwright	2,200	60.6	▲0.4
Liberal	Joseph Davies	1,430	39.4	▼0.4
Majority		770	21.2	▲0.8
Turnout		3,630	89.3	▼5.5
Registered electors		4,066		
Conservative hold		Swing	▲0.4	

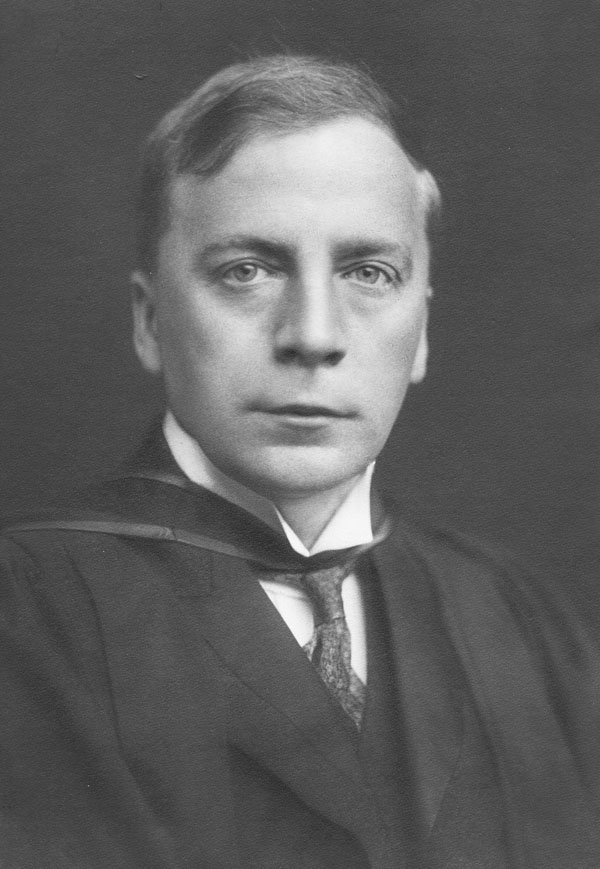
William Hewins

1912 Hereford by-election
Party	Candidate	Votes	%	±%
Liberal Unionist	William Hewins	Unopposed		
Liberal Unionist hold				

General Election 1914–15:

Another General Election was required to take place before the end of 1915. The political parties had been making preparations for an election to take place and by July 1914, the following candidates had been selected;

- Unionist: William Hewins
- Liberal:

General election 1918: Hereford
Party		Candidate	Votes	%	±%
C	Unionist	Charles Pulley	11,680	75.8	▲15.2
	Labour	Sidney Box	3,730	24.2	New
Majority			7,950	51.6	▲30.4
Turnout			15,410	54.6	▼24.7
Registered electors			28,246		
	Unionist hold		Swing		
C indicates candidate endorsed by the coalition government.

=== Elections in the 1920s ===
1921 Hereford by-election
Party		Candidate	Votes	%	±%
C	Unionist	Samuel Roberts	9,670	56.6	▼19.2
	Liberal	Ernest Wilfred Langford	7,411	43.4	New
Majority			2,259	13.2	▼38.4
Turnout			17,081	62.5	▲7.9
Registered electors			27,316		
	Unionist hold		Swing	▼19.2	
C indicates candidate endorsed by the coalition government.

General election 1922: Hereford
Party	Candidate	Votes	%	±%
Unionist	Samuel Roberts	13,138	76.2	▲0.4
Labour	James Jonas Dodd	4,094	23.8	▼0.4
Majority		9,044	52.4	▲0.8
Turnout		17,232	62.0	▲7.4
Registered electors		27,774		
Unionist hold		Swing	▲0.4	

General election 1923: Hereford
Party	Candidate	Votes	%	±%
Unionist	Samuel Roberts	11,448	55.3	▼20.9
Liberal	J. Howard Whitehouse	8,280	40.0	New
Labour	Sidney Box	981	4.7	▼19.1
Majority		3,168	15.3	▼37.1
Turnout		20,709	72.6	▲10.6
Registered electors		28,538		
Unionist hold		Swing	▼0.9	

General election 1924: Hereford
Party	Candidate	Votes	%	±%
Unionist	Samuel Roberts	13,210	60.6	▲5.3
Liberal	J. Howard Whitehouse	8,604	39.4	▼0.6
Majority		4,606	21.2	▲5.9
Turnout		21,814	75.0	▲2.4
Registered electors		29,083		
Unionist hold		Swing	▲3.0	

General election 30 May 1929: Hereford
Party	Candidate	Votes	%	±%
Liberal	Frank Owen	14,208	48.7	▲9.3
Unionist	Frederic Carnegie Romilly	13,087	44.8	▼15.8
Labour	Henry Cooper	1,901	6.5	New
Majority		1,121	3.9	N/A
Turnout		29,196	78.9	▲3.9
Registered electors		36,984		
Liberal gain from Unionist		Swing	▲12.6	

=== Elections in the 1930s ===
General election 27 October 1931: Hereford
Party	Candidate	Votes	%	±%
Conservative	James Thomas	19,418	60.90	
Liberal	Frank Owen	12,465	39.10	
Majority		6,953	21.80	N/A
Turnout		31,883	83.85	
Conservative gain from Liberal		Swing		

General election 14 November 1935: Hereford
Party	Candidate	Votes	%	±%
Conservative	James Thomas	18,234	61.84	
Liberal	Walter Dingley	8,853	30.03	
Labour	George Clarke	2,397	8.13	New
Majority		9,381	31.81	
Turnout		29,484	74.67	
Conservative hold		Swing		

=== Elections in the 1940s ===
General Election 1939–40:

Another General Election was required to take place before the end of 1940. The political parties had been making preparations for an election to take place from 1939 and by the end of this year, the following candidates had been selected;

- Conservative: James Thomas
- Liberal: Archie Marshall

General election 1945: Hereford
Party	Candidate	Votes	%	±%
Conservative	James Thomas	17,439	51.8	−10.0
Labour	William Pigott	8,359	24.8	+16.7
Liberal	Archie Marshall	7,871	23.4	−6.6
Majority		9,080	27.0	−4.8
Turnout		33,669	69.3	−5.3
Registered electors		48,574		
Conservative hold		Swing		

=== Elections in the 1950s ===
General election 1950: Hereford
Party	Candidate	Votes	%
Conservative	James Thomas	18,314	51.6
Labour	William Pigott	11,185	31.5
Liberal	Albert Edward Farr	5,965	16.8
Majority		7,129	20.1
Turnout		35,464	80.5
Registered electors		44,059	
Conservative win (new boundaries)			

General election 1951: Hereford
Party	Candidate	Votes	%	±%
Conservative	James Thomas	21,204	61.3	+9.7
Labour	William Pigott	13,396	38.7	+7.2
Majority		7,808	22.6	+2.5
Turnout		34,600	77.6	−2.9
Registered electors				
Conservative hold		Swing		

General election 1955: Hereford
Party	Candidate	Votes	%	±%
Conservative	James Thomas	18,058	51.8	−9.5
Liberal	Frank Owen	8,658	24.8	New
Labour	E.L. Patricia Seers	8,154	23.4	−15.3
Majority		9,400	27.0	+4.4
Turnout		34,870	78.8	+1.2
Conservative hold		Swing		

1956 Hereford by-election
Party	Candidate	Votes	%	±%
Conservative	David Gibson-Watt	12,129	44.3	▼7.5
Liberal	Frank Owen	9,979	36.4	▲11.6
Labour	Bryan Stanley	5,277	19.3	▼4.1
Majority		2,150	7.9	▼19.1
Turnout		27,385		
Conservative hold		Swing		

General election 1959: Hereford
Party	Candidate	Votes	%	±%
Conservative	David Gibson-Watt	17,763	49.3	+2.5
Liberal	Robin Day	10,185	28.3	+3.5
Labour	John W Wardle	8,097	22.4	−1.0
Majority		7,578	21.0	−6.0
Turnout		36,045	79.5	+0.7
Conservative hold		Swing		

=== Elections in the 1960s ===
General election 1964: Hereford
Party	Candidate	Votes	%	±%
Conservative	David Gibson-Watt	17,780	45.45	
Labour	Thomas J. H. Bishop	12,020	30.72	
Liberal	Kenneth Vaus	9,322	23.83	
Majority		5,760	14.73	
Turnout		39,122	79.10	
Conservative hold		Swing		

General election 1966: Hereford
Party	Candidate	Votes	%	±%
Conservative	David Gibson-Watt	17,529	44.60	
Labour	Michael Prendergast	14,782	37.61	
Liberal	Kenneth Vaus	6,996	17.80	
Majority		2,747	6.99	
Turnout		39,307	77.30	
Conservative hold		Swing		

=== Elections in the 1970s ===
General election 1970: Hereford
Party	Candidate	Votes	%	±%
Conservative	David Gibson-Watt	22,011	53.20	
Labour	Gerard D Purnell	14,410	34.83	
Liberal	Thomas R Crowther	4,953	11.97	
Majority		7,601	18.37	
Turnout		41,374	73.37	
Conservative hold		Swing		

General election February 1974: Hereford
Party	Candidate	Votes	%	±%
Conservative	David Gibson-Watt	18,676	41.31	
Liberal	Brian Tannant Nash	15,238	33.70	
Labour	IE Geffen	11,299	24.99	
Majority		3,438	7.61	
Turnout		45,213	78.89	
Conservative hold		Swing		

General election October 1974: Hereford
Party	Candidate	Votes	%	±%
Conservative	Colin Shepherd	17,060	38.9	−2.4
Liberal	Brian Tannant Nash	15,948	36.4	+2.7
Labour	Michael K Prendergast	10,820	24.7	−0.3
Majority		1,112	2.5	−5.1
Turnout		43,828	75.8	−3.1
Conservative hold		Swing		

General election 1979: Hereford
Party	Candidate	Votes	%	±%
Conservative	Colin Shepherd	23,012	47.7	+8.8
Liberal	Christopher Green	18,042	37.4	+1.0
Labour	IR Adshead	7,150	14.8	−9.9
Majority		4,970	10.3	+7.8
Turnout		48,204	78.5	+2.7
Conservative hold		Swing		

=== Elections in the 1980s ===
General election 1983: Hereford
Party	Candidate	Votes	%	±%
Conservative	Colin Shepherd	23,334	48.1	+0.4
Liberal	Christopher Green	21,057	43.4	+6.0
Labour	John Evans	3,690	7.6	−7.2
Ecology	Victoria Murray	463	1.0	New
Majority		2,277	4.7	−5.6
Turnout		48,544	75.8	−2.7
Conservative hold		Swing		

General election 1987: Hereford
Party	Candidate	Votes	%	±%
Conservative	Colin Shepherd	24,865	47.5	−0.6
Liberal	Christopher Green	23,452	44.8	+1.4
Labour	Vivian Woodell	4,031	7.7	+0.1
Majority		1,413	2.7	−2.0
Turnout		52,348	78.0	+2.2
Conservative hold		Swing		

=== Elections in the 1990s ===
General election 1992: Hereford
Party	Candidate	Votes	%	±%
Conservative	Colin Shepherd	26,727	47.2	▼0.3
Liberal Democrats	Gwynoro Jones	23,314	41.2	▼3.6
Labour	JE Kelly	6,005	10.6	▲2.9
Green	CT Mattingly	596	1.1	New
Majority		3,413	6.0	▲3.3
Turnout		56,642	81.3	▲3.3
Registered electors		69,676		
Conservative hold		Swing	▲1.7	

1992 notional result
Party	Vote	%
Conservative	26,217	47.0
Liberal Democrats	23,063	41.3
Labour	5,910	10.6
Others	587	1.1
Turnout	55,777	80.8
Electorate	69,057	

General election 1997: Hereford
Party	Candidate	Votes	%	±%
Liberal Democrats	Paul Keetch	25,198	47.9	▲6.6
Conservative	Colin Shepherd	18,550	35.3	▼11.7
Labour	Chris Chappell	6,596	12.6	▲2.0
Referendum	Clive Easton	2,209	4.2	New
Majority		6,648	12.7	N/A
Turnout		52,553	75.2	▼5.5
Registered electors		69,864		+807
Liberal Democrats gain from Conservative		Swing	▲9.2	

=== Elections in the 2000s ===
General election 2001: Hereford
Party	Candidate	Votes	%	±%
Liberal Democrats	Paul Keetch	18,244	40.9	▼7.0
Conservative	Virginia Taylor	17,276	38.7	▲3.4
Labour	David Hallam	6,739	15.1	▲2.5
UKIP	Clive Easton	1,184	2.7	New
Green	David Gillett	1,181	2.6	New
Majority		968	2.2	▼10.4
Turnout		44,624	63.6	▼11.6
Registered electors				
Liberal Democrats hold		Swing	▼5.2	

General election 2005: Hereford
Party	Candidate	Votes	%	±%
Liberal Democrats	Paul Keetch	20,285	43.3	▲2.4
Conservative	Virginia Taylor	19,323	41.2	▲2.5
Labour	Thomas Calver	4,800	10.2	▼4.9
Green	Brian Lunt	1,052	2.2	▼0.4
UKIP	Christopher Kingsley	1,030	2.2	▼0.5
Independent	Peter Morton	404	0.9	New
Majority		962	2.1	▼0.12
Turnout		46,894	66.2	▲2.6
Registered electors				
Liberal Democrats hold		Swing	▼0.06	

== See also ==
- Parliamentary constituencies in Herefordshire and Worcestershire

== Sources ==
- Robert Beatson, A Chronological Register of Both Houses of Parliament (London: Longman, Hurst, Res & Orme, 1807)
- D Brunton & D H Pennington, Members of the Long Parliament (London: George Allen & Unwin, 1954)
- Cobbett's Parliamentary history of England, from the Norman Conquest in 1066 to the year 1803 (London: Thomas Hansard, 1808)
- The Constitutional Year Book for 1913 (London: National Union of Conservative and Unionist Associations, 1913)
- F W S Craig, British Parliamentary Election Results 1832–1885 (2nd edition, Aldershot: Parliamentary Research Services, 1989)
- F W S Craig, British Parliamentary Election Results 1918–1949 (Glasgow: Political Reference Publications, 1969)
- Maija Jansson (ed.), Proceedings in Parliament, 1614 (House of Commons) (Philadelphia: American Philosophical Society, 1988)
- J E Neale, The Elizabethan House of Commons (London: Jonathan Cape, 1949)
