= Anne-Margaretta Burr =

English painter (1817–1892)

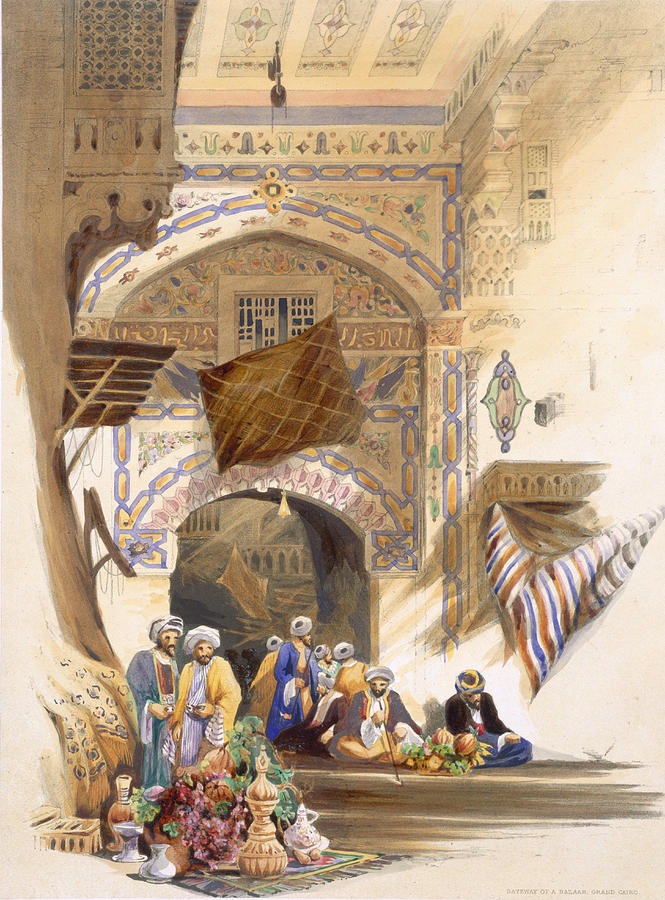
Gateway of a Bazaar, Grand Cairo watercolour by Anne-Margaretta Burr (1840)

Anne-Margaretta Burr (née Scobell, also known as Margaretta Higford Burr; 30 April 1817 – 22 January 1892) was an English watercolour painter.

== Biography ==
Burr was born at Poltair House in Poltair, Cornwall. She was the only daughter of Royal Navy Captain Edward Scobell. Scobell also owned a property in London's Dorset Square. Burr travelled widely for inspiration, and published Sketches in Spain, The Holy Land, Egypt, Turkey, and Greece in 1841. Burr later became a travelling companion of Austen Layard, and painted many watercolours on travels through Egypt and Turkey. Dante Gabriel Rossetti wrote descriptions of her tracings of threatened Italian mosaics in the mid-19th century.

On 18 September 1839, the then Anne-Margaretta Scobell married Daniel Higford Davall Burr at St Marylebone Parish Church. Over the next 15 years, the couple had three sons – Higford (born 20 July 1840), Edward (born 25 September 1842), and James-Scudamore (born 15 January 1854).

After her husband's death in 1885, Burr retired to Venice where she died on 22 January 1892. The couple's English property, Aldermaston Court, was inherited by Higford on his father's death. Higford, who also took the surname Higford (after an ancestor) and was known as Higford Higford, sold the estate to Charles Edward Keyser in 1893.

== Works ==
Burr's works include Interior of a Harem, in Cairo, Holy Sepulchre, in Jerusalem, The Missr Tcharsky, or Egyptian Market, in Constantinople, The Mosque of Sultan Hassan, Cairo (1846), Gateway of a Bazaar, Grand Cairo (1846), and Street Leading to El Azhar, Grand Cairo (1846).
