= Daniel Burr =

Member of Parliament and High Sheriff of Berkshire (1811–1885)

Daniel Burr MP JP DL
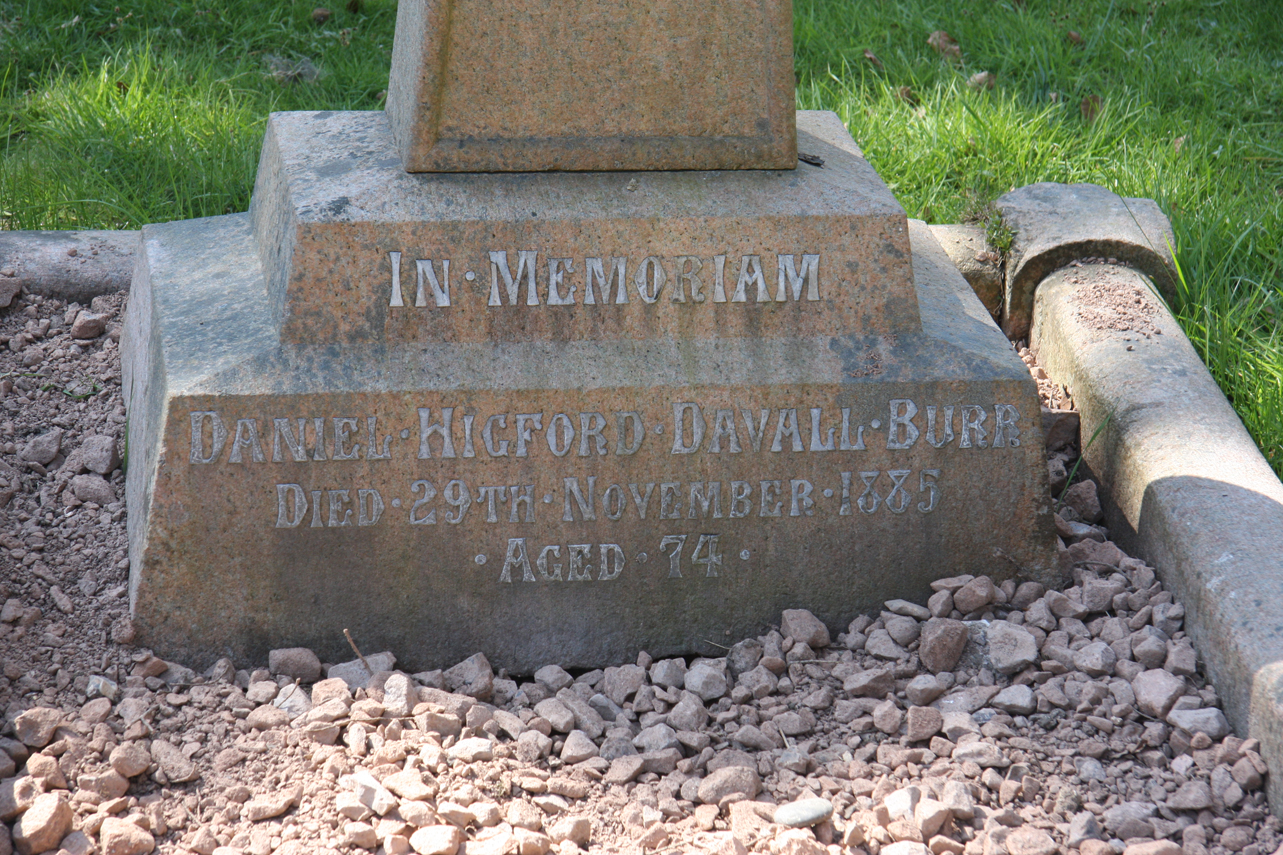
- Burr's grave at the Church of St Mary the Virgin, Aldermaston
- Born: Daniel Higford Davall Burr
- Died: 29 November 1885 (aged 74); Aldermaston, Berkshire
- Resting place: Church of St Mary the Virgin, Aldermaston
- Occupation: Member of Parliament
- Title: Lord of the Manor of Aldermaston
- Term: 1849–1885
- Predecessor: Daniel Higford Davall Burr
- Spouse: Anne-Margaretta Scobell
- Children: 3
- Parent(s): Daniel Burr and Mary Davis
- Relatives: James Davis (maternal grandfather); Charles Howard, 11th Duke of Norfolk (maternal great-grandfather)

Daniel Higford Davall Burr JP DL (24 March 1811 – 29 November 1885) was a British Member of Parliament and Justice of the Peace.

== Biography ==
Burr was born to Daniel Burr (a lieutenant colonel with the East India Company) and Mary Davis. His maternal grandfather was James Davis. His maternal lineage also included Charles Howard, 11th Duke of Norfolk. He was educated at Eton and Christ Church, Oxford.

On 1 February 1836, Burr's mother died and he inherited the estate of Alvington, Gloucestershire. The following year, he became Conservative Member of Parliament for Hereford, a position he held for four years. He was a member of the Carlton Club.

In 1849, Burr purchased Aldermaston Court, a country estate in Aldermaston, Berkshire, that had been destroyed by fire six years previously. He commissioned Philip Charles Hardwick to build a neoclassical mansion. Burr was an eccentric, and owned monkeys and snakes. His monkey was known to climb the maypole on the village green.

In 1851, Burr became High Sheriff of Berkshire.

== Landholdings ==
In 1883 John Bateman in his digest of the Return of Owners of Land, 1873, The Great Landowners of Great Britain and Ireland, listed Burr's lands as follows:

- Gloucestershire 1,200 acres worth 2,200 guineas per annum;
- Berkshire [Aldermaston] 2,778 acres worth 3,054 guineas per annum (with 51 acres in Hampshire worth 37 guineas per annum);
- Herefordshire 500 acres worth 750 guineas per annum;
- Monmouthshire 6 acres worth 12 guineas per annum.

- Total 4,535 acres, with a rental value of 6,053 guineas per annum.

== Personal life ==
Burr married Anne-Margaretta Scobell, an amateur watercolour artist, on 18 September 1839 at St Marylebone Parish Church. They had four sons – Higford (b. 20 July 1840), Edward (b. 25 September 1842), James Scudamore (b. 15 January 1854), and Arthur Scudamore (b. 21 June 1857).

Burr died on 29 November 1885. The Aldermaston estate was occupied by his son Higford for a short while, before he sold it to Charles Edward Keyser in 1893.

Burr's family's coat of arms included a golden rampant lion, with a crest inscribed with "Ternate" – the Indonesian Maluku Island captured by his father in 1801. The family's motto was versus veras honos – literally "virtue, truth, honour".

Parliament of the United Kingdom
| Preceded by Edward Clive; Robert Biddulph | Member of Parliament for Hereford; 1837–1841; With: Edward Clive | Succeeded by Edward Clive; Henry William Hobhouse |
Honorary titles
| Preceded by Robert Allfrey | High Sheriff of Berkshire; 1851 | Succeeded by John Samuel Bowles |
