= West's Meadow, Aldermaston =

Protected area in Berkshire, England

- Site of Special Scientific Interest
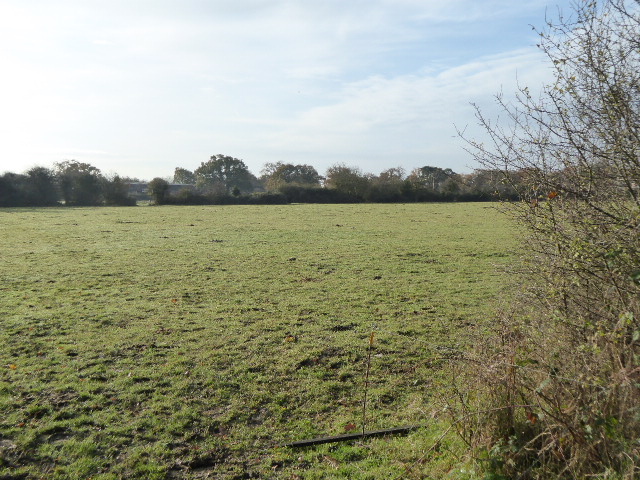

- Location within Berkshire
- Location of West's Meadow, Aldermaston.
- Area of search: Berkshire
- Grid reference: SU 597 626
- Coordinates: 51.359°N 1.144°W
- Interest: Biological
- Area: 1.2 hectares (3.0 acres)
- Notification date: 1986
- Location map: Magic Map

West's Meadow, Aldermaston is a 1.2-hectare (3.0-acre) biological Site of Special Scientific Interest south of Aldermaston in Berkshire.

The site consists of two fields bounded by hedgerows and a small stream. It has been managed by grazing since the 1950s.

The site is private land with no public access.

== Flora ==
The site has the following flora:

=== Trees ===
- Oak
- Crataegus
- holly
- Rowan
- Hazel
- Willow
- Ulmus procera
- Prunus avium
- Malus sylvestris
- Willow
- Ulmus procera

=== Plants ===
- Danthonia decumbens
- Vulpia bromoides
- Euphrasia nemorosa
- Polygala serpyllifolia
- Ononis spinosa
- Stachys officinalis
- Lathyrus montanus
- Dactylorhiza maculata
- Achillea ptarmica
- Succisa pratensis
- Lysimachia nummularia
- Pedicularis sylvatica
- Sanguisorba officinalis
- Cirsium dissectum
- Isolepis setacea
- Veronica scutellata
- Hydrocotyle vulgaris
- Lychnis flos-cuculi
- Cardamine pratensis
- Festuca rubra
- Holcus lanatus
- Ranunculus repens
- Dicranum bonjeanii
- water-starwort
- Ranunculus sceleratus
- Gorse
- Broom
