= Portland House, Aldermaston =

Portland House

General information
- Location: Aldermaston
- Town or city: Berkshire
- Country: United Kingdom
- Coordinates: 51.37991°N 1.14670°W
- Completed: Mid-1980s

Design and construction
- Architect(s): Richard Gilbert Scott

Portland House is an office building in Aldermaston, Berkshire, UK. It was designed by Richard Gilbert Scott (1923-2017), the architect son of Sir Giles Gilbert Scott. It was one of the buildings he was most proud of, and in his last years was distressed to learn it was under threat. After the Aldermaston estate was bought by Praxis in 2014, Scott's building was - without proper consultation - awarded a Certificate of Immunity from Listing. In June 2017 the Aldermaston estate was again for sale.

Built on the site of Associated Electrical Industries's MERLIN reactor, Portland House was built in the mid-1980s as a new international headquarters for Blue Circle Industries. It was opened by Prince Richard, Duke of Gloucester, and won an award in 1986 from The Concrete Society.

After Pioneer Concrete's acquisition of Blue Circle in 2001, the telecommunications company Acterna became tenants of the building.
