= Aldermaston Gravel Pits =

Chalk quarry in Berkshire, England

- Site of Special Scientific Interest
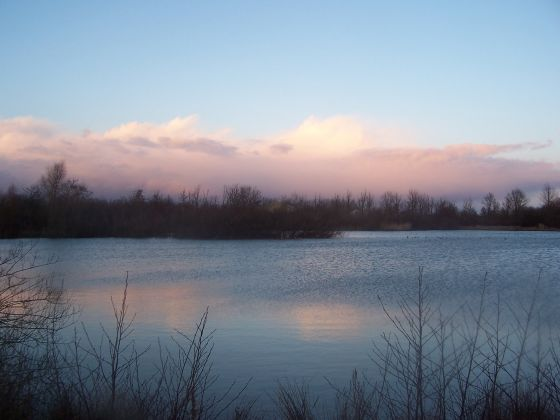

- Location within Berkshire
- Location of Aldermaston Gravel Pits.
- Area of search: Berkshire
- Grid reference: SU 596 668
- Coordinates: 51.39711°N 1.14470°W
- Interest: Biological
- Area: 24.6 hectares
- Notification date: 1983
- Location map: Magic Map

Aldermaston Gravel Pits is a 24.6-hectare (61-acre) biological Site of Special Scientific Interest north of Aldermaston in Berkshire. It was purchased by Natural England in 2003.

This site consists of mature flooded gravel workings surrounded by dense fringing vegetation, trees and scrub, affording a variety of habitats for breeding birds and a refuge for wildfowl. The irregular shoreline, with islands, promontories, sheltered eutrophic pools and narrow lagoons provides undisturbed habitat for many water birds including surface feeding ducks such as teal and shoveler. The surrounding marsh and scrub are important for numerous birds including nine breeding species of warblers, water rails, kingfishers and an important breeding colony of nightingales.
