= Aldermaston Court =

Country house and private park in Berkshire, England

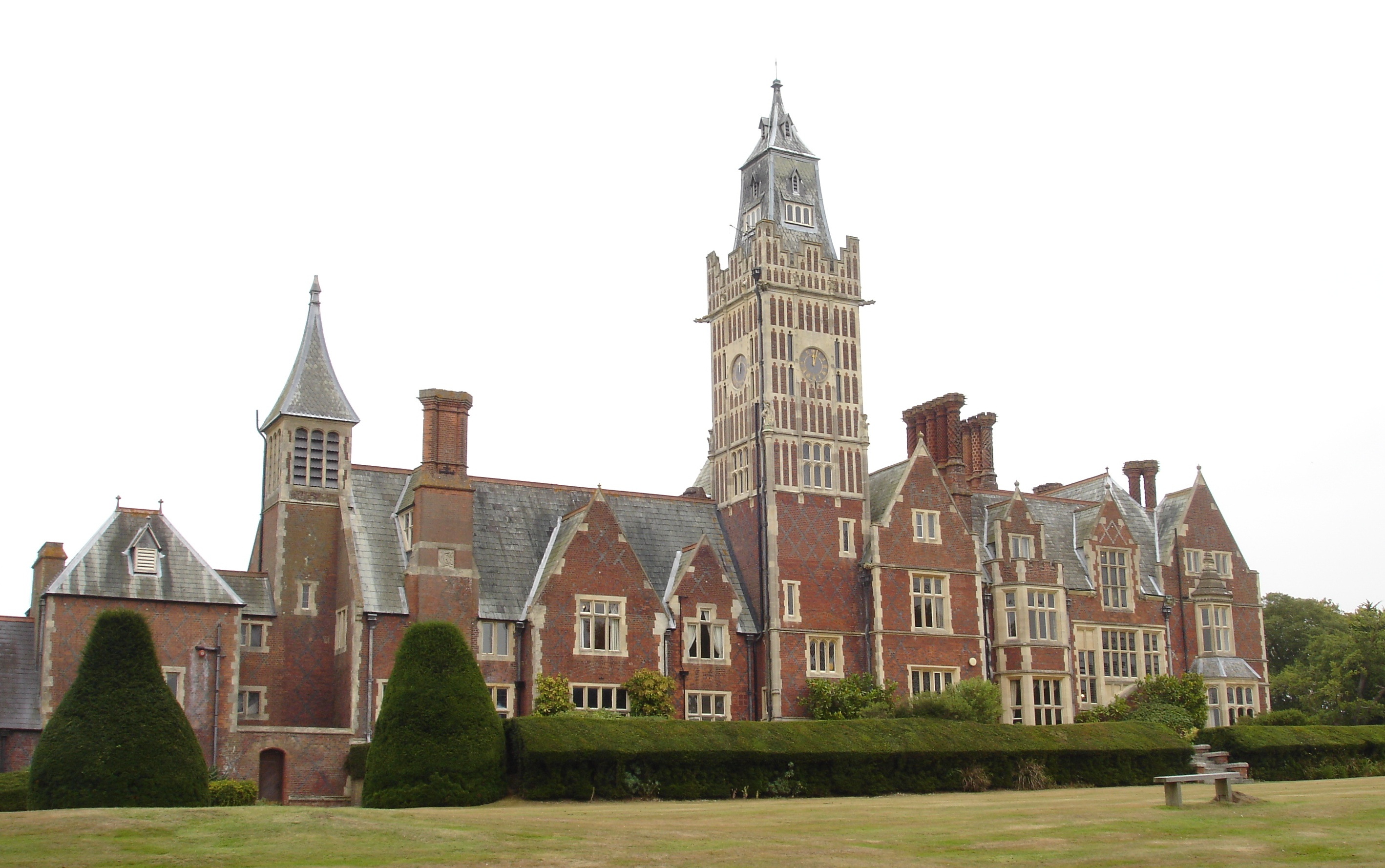
- Aldermaston Court in 2009

- Location within Berkshire

General information
- Architectural style: Neo-Elizabethan
- Location: Aldermaston, Berkshire, England
- Coordinates: 51°22′45″N 1°8′37″W
- Year built: 1636
- Renovated: 1848
- Client: Daniel Higford Davall Burr

Technical details
- Grounds: 780 acres (320 ha)

Listed Building – Grade II*
- Official name: Aldermaston Court
- Designated: 14 April 1967
- Reference no.: 1117317

National Register of Historic Parks and Gardens
- Official name: Aldermaston Court
- Designated: 30 September 1987
- Reference no.: 1000530

Aldermaston Court is a country house and private park built in the Victorian era for Daniel Higford Davall Burr with incorporations from a Stuart house. It is south-east of the village nucleus of Aldermaston in the English county of Berkshire. The predecessor manor house became a mansion from the wealth of its land and from assistance to Charles I during the English Civil War, under ownership of the Forster baronets of Aldermaston after which the estate has alternated between the names Aldermaston Park and Aldermaston Manor.

The estate became dominated by its neo-Elizabethan mansion after a fire of 1843 destroyed one third of the predecessor and various landscape features were added which have resulted in the building being Grade II* listed and the grounds Grade II listed. Between the turn of the 21st century and its closure in 2012, the estate has been a wedding venue, a conference centre, and a hotel. Aside from the manor house and its immediate surroundings, the park is home to office buildings and a lake.

== Architecture ==
The current house is situated approximately 50 metres (160 ft) south of the original manor house. Rebuilt by Daniel Burr in 1848 following a huge fire, the new manor was built in the Elizabethan style, and incorporated the figured wooden staircase, some stained glass, and the chimney stacks from the 1636 house, which was later demolished.

=== Park ===
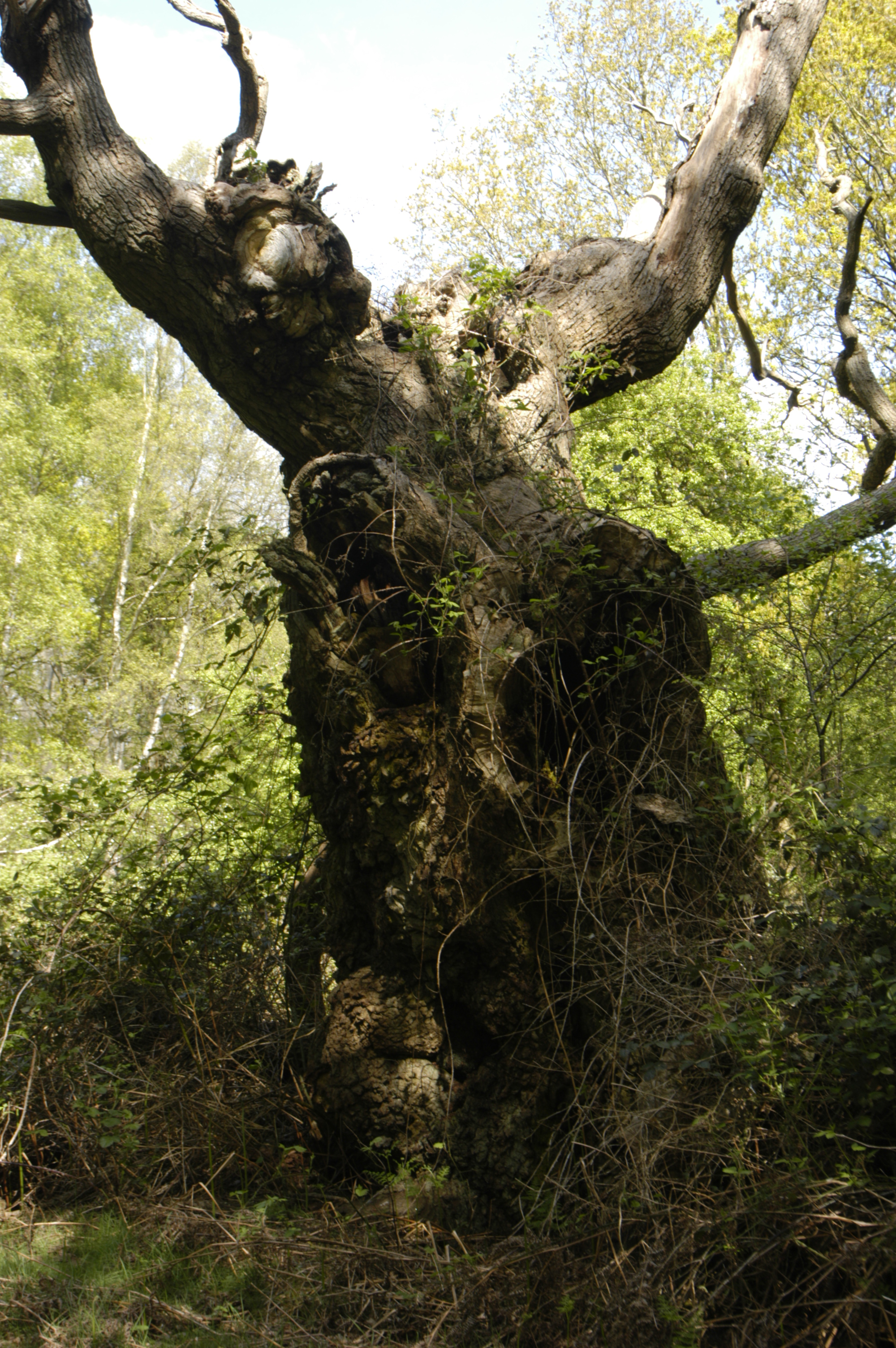
An ancient pollarded oak in Aldermaston Park

Aldermaston Park is an ancient and derelict wood pasture, featuring numerous examples of pollard oak and sweet chestnut. In the mid-16th century, the park was 286 acres (116 ha), by 1721 it was 436 acres (176 ha) and by 1860 it was considered 780 acres (320 ha).

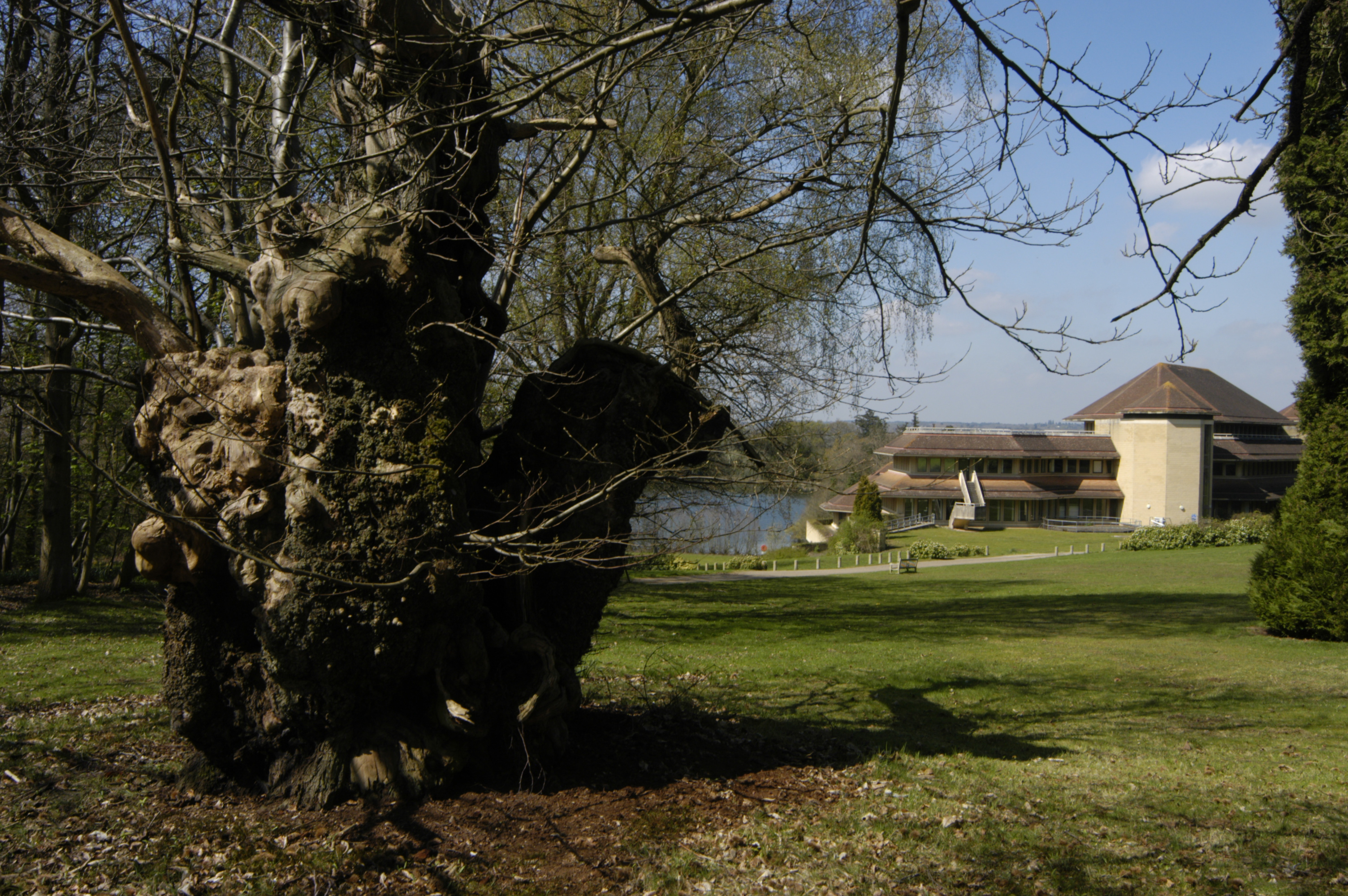
Vintage pollard sweet chestnut

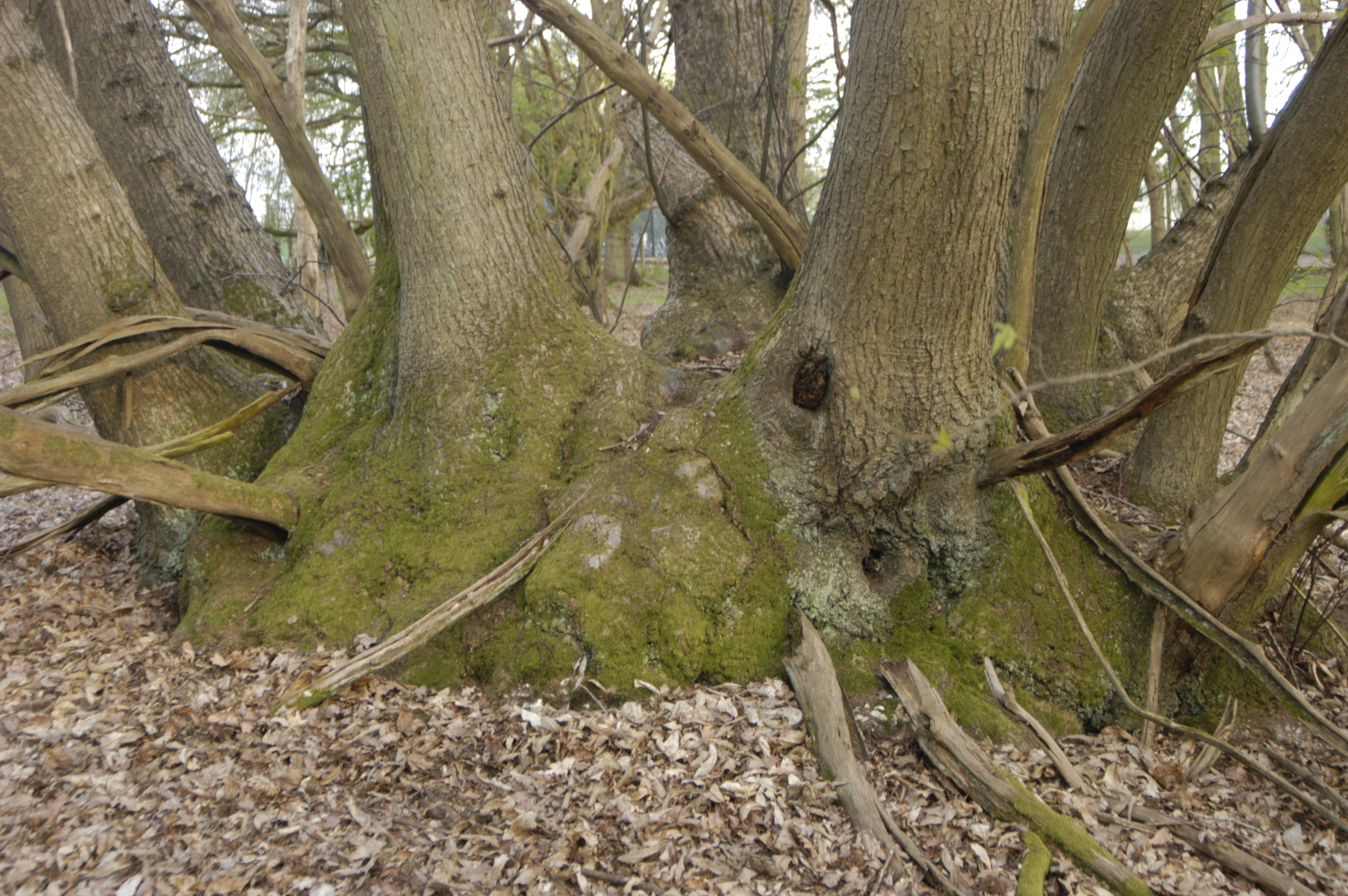
Sweet chestnut coppice stool

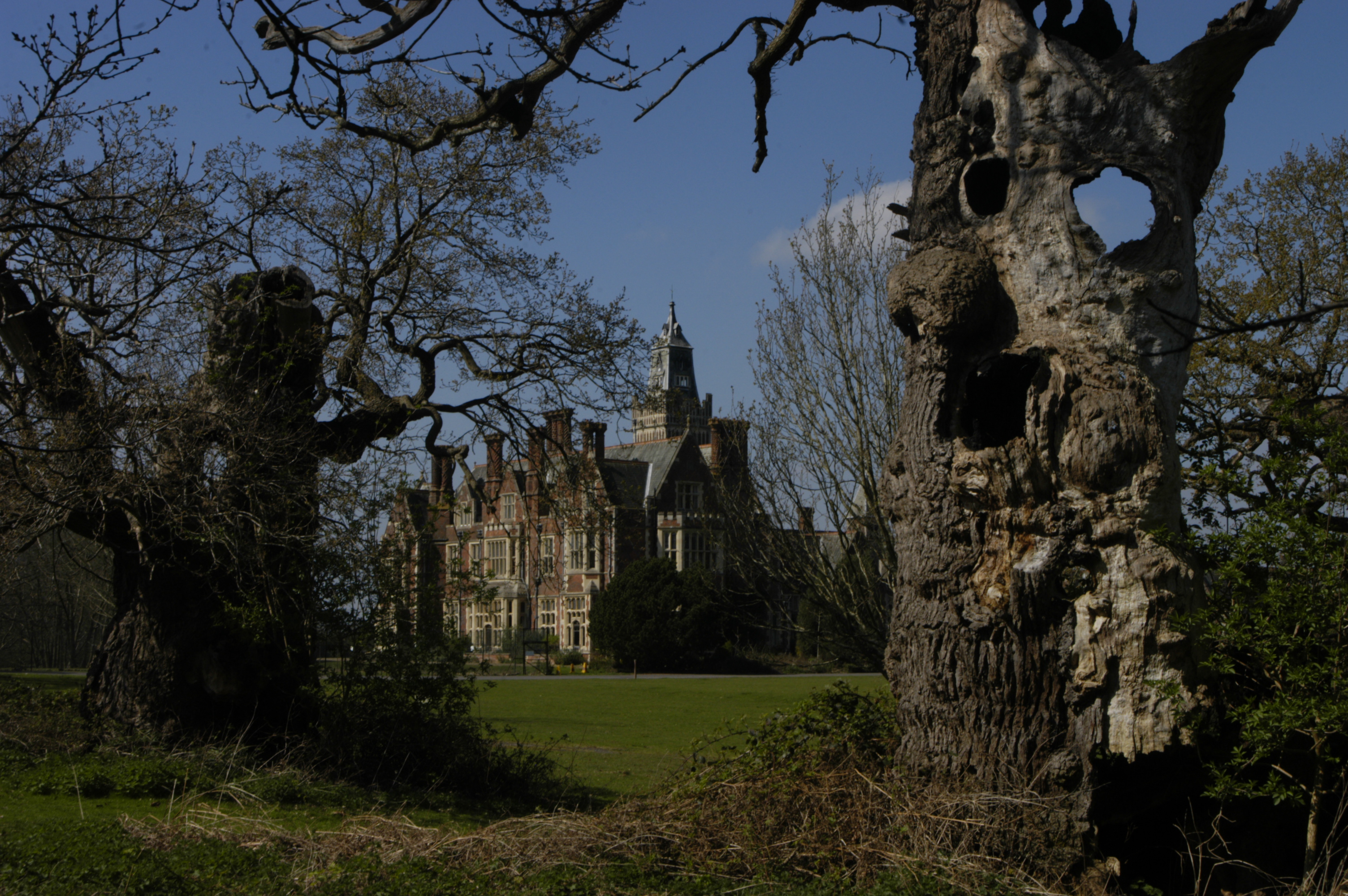
Vintage pollard oaks

== History of the estate ==
=== The Achard Family (11th century–1361) ===
The Achard coat of arms

Robert FitzAchard (1070–1161) was granted the Aldermaston estate in 1100 by Henry I of England; no records of the house at this time have survived. FitzAchard was a distinguished Norman soldier whose son built the north transept in the parish church. According to the Pipe Rolls of 1168, the name had become Aldermannestun. The Achard family hosted Henry III at the manor in 1227, but granted a long lease of the rectory and glebe to Priory of Monk Sherborne (Pamber Priory); the family are all buried at their secondary manor of Sparsholt. The estate descended to Peter Achard who died in 1361 with a female heir (daughter); it was inherited by Thomas de la Mare as his son-in-law.

=== De la Mare descendants (1361–1490) ===
The De la Mare coat of arms

De la Mare was from Somerset, and became the High Sheriff of Berkshire in 1370. His son was bestowed with this same position during Richard II's reign in the late 14th century. Robert de la Mare, Thomas's grandson, married into the Brocas family of Beaurepaire, near Bramley, and was made a Knight of the Shire by Henry V. Robert's son was the last of the de la Mare lineage, and a Knight of the Holy Sepulchre.

Elizabeth de la Mare, whose male relatives predeceased her, inherited Aldermaston. She married into the Forster baronets' family from Northumberland. Stephen Forster, an ancestor, had previously become the Lord Mayor of London in 1454.

=== Forster descendants (1490–1752) ===
The Forster coat of arms

Elizabeth's husband, George Forster, was the son of Sir Humphrey Forster I from Harpsden near Henley. When Elizabeth and George married, George became the owner of Aldermaston Manor along with other manors previously owned by the De la Mare family. He was knighted by Henry VII in 1501, becoming Sheriff of Berkshire and Oxford in 1517. He was made a Knight of the Bath in 1525. His assumed wealth meant that he was part of Henry VIII's entourage at the Field of the Cloth of Gold. George was succeeded by his son, Humphrey II, in 1533, a high sheriff.

During Humphrey II's lordship, he faced strong disputes with Francis Parkyns (alternatively spelled "Perkins"), who was the brother of the Squire of Ufton and tenant of nearby Padworth Manor. Parkyns was unhappy with Forster's "over-lordship" of Aldermaston, and Forster retaliated by breaking into Parkyns's house and severely assaulting him while he ate breakfast. Anne Parkyns, Francis's wife, begged for his life. Forster – along with an armed entourage – dragged Francis to Ufton, where the family of his brother Richard were breakfasting. More violence broke out, with Lady Marvyn – Richard's wife – also begging for Francis's life to be spared. Francis was eventually taken to Aldermaston where he was jailed in the lock-up behind the village pub.

Humphrey was later succeeded by his son, William (who married Jane, daughter of Anthony Hungerford).

Elizabeth I visited Aldermaston twice. Her first visit, in 1558, was during the lordship of William, and the second – in 1592 – during his son Humphrey III's tenure.

Humphrey III's son, William II, fathered a son – Humphrey IV – in 1595. He and his wife Anne began building a mansion house, known as Aldermaston House, in 1618 by laying a new cornerstone. The house was completed in 1636, and was dedicated with a short verse:

We live and build with one mind and
dedicated both our lives and this house to
God and to fortune.
In the year of our Lord 1636

— Sir Humphrey and Lady Anne Forster, on the completion of the predecessor mansion, Aldermaston House, in 1636

Aldermaston saw military stationing in the English Civil War. In 1643 after the First Battle of Newbury, Robert Devereux's Parliamentarians were attacked by Prince Rupert of the Rhine in Padworth Lane. The road is now known as Red Lane, having taken its name from the bloodshed.

Shield of Forster. Sable a cheveron engrailed between three arrows argent.

In October of the following year, a regiment of Parliamentary troops under the command Edward Montagu, 2nd Earl of Manchester camped in the Aldermaston area. They were defending the crossing at the River Kennet, an operation that came about due to Humphrey Forster's staunch Royalist support. All the estates were sequestered because of these affiliations during the English Commonwealth and returned on the restoration of 1660. Humphrey IV died in 1663. His grandson, an MP, Sir Humphrey Forster, 2nd Baronet (c. 1649 – December 1711), died at the age of about 62 when the baronetcy became extinct.

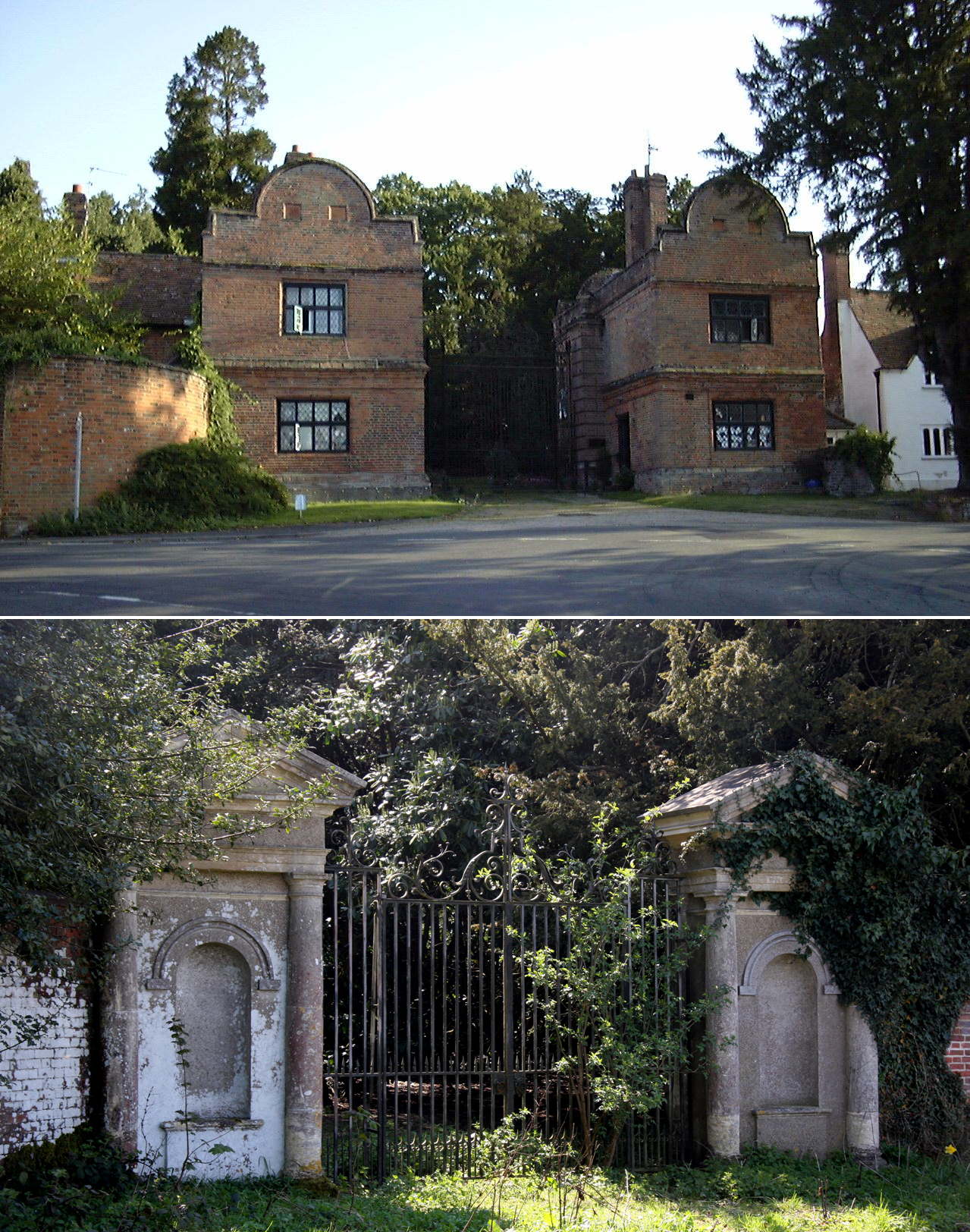
Above: The gatehouses and Eagle Gates at the north entrance to the estate. Below: The Charity Gates at the east side of the estate.

=== Congreve family inheritance (1752–1843) ===
The Congreve coat of arms

In 1752 Forster direct descendants died out and the estate passed to Ralph Congreve as third husband of Sir Humphrey Forster, 2nd Baronet's grand-niece and heir.

In 1780 the estate passed to his second cousin, William (a relation of the dramatist of the same name). Many changes to their estate occurred during William's ownership. The lake by the house was created by damming the stream. The wrought-iron Eagle Gates, at the north-west of the estate, were won at a game of cards so taken from Midgham. To install them, the estate's north-west lodge (a dower house) was dissected (removing the 60 square metres (650 sq ft) centre section). The estate's east gates are known as the Charity Gates; Congreve's daughters frequently sat by the gates and gave alms to the poor.

In approximately 1800, Congreve had a stable block built due west of the house; this is extant and until the site's vacancy was used as office space.

William Congreve's butler at Aldermaston House, John Manning, died on 31 August 1811. Congreve erected the headstone on his grave in the village churchyard.

On 13 January 1843, a serious fire destroyed more than a third of the manor house. William Congreve never recovered from the fire and died the same year. The Congreve name is retained in the name of a cul-de-sac in the village.

=== Burr family purchase and rebuilding (1849–1893) ===
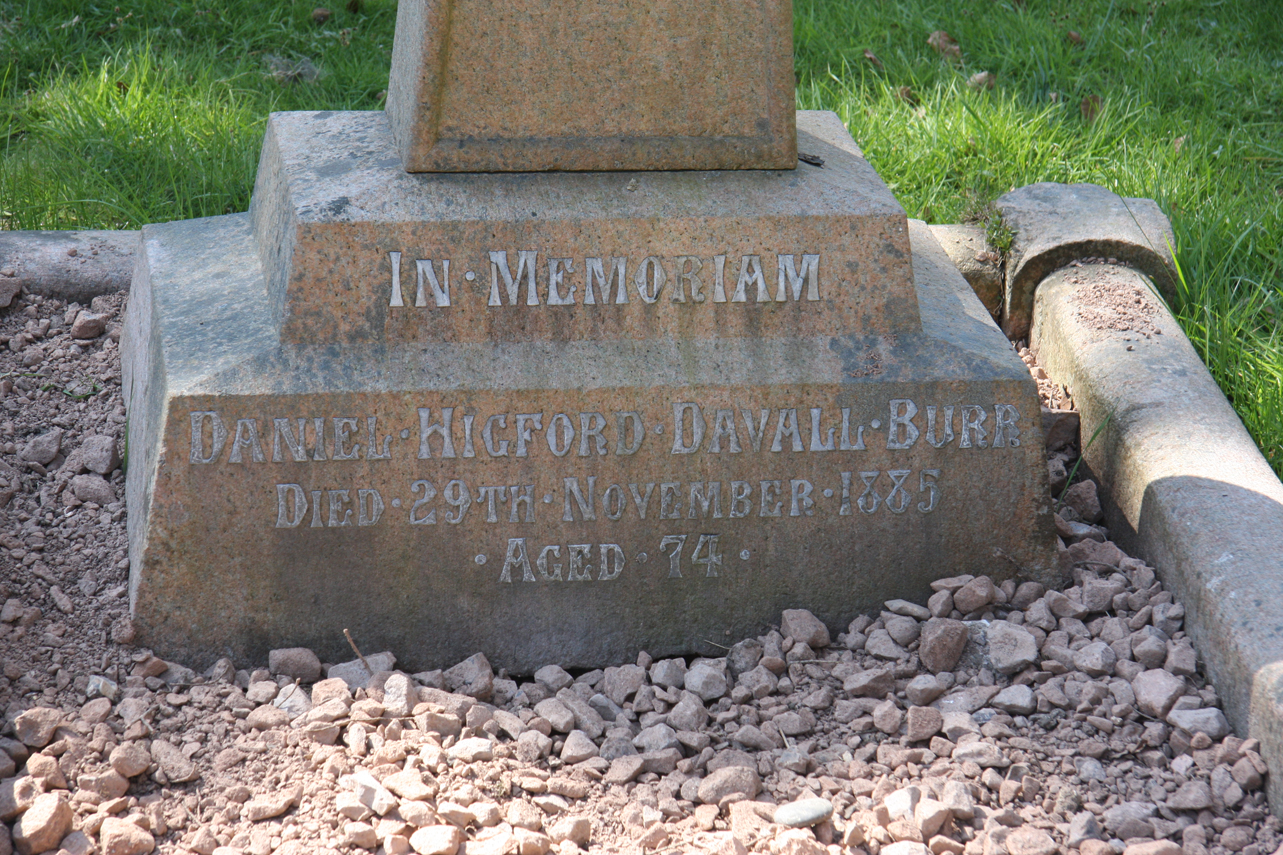
Daniel Burr's memorial outside the Church of St Mary the Virgin, Aldermaston

Aldermaston Manor (Note: Around this time, the village was occasionally recorded as Admiston.) passed into the Court of Chancery, and was eventually purchased in 1849 by Daniel Higford Davall Burr. Since 1836, Burr had owned the Alvington manor in Gloucestershire (having inherited it upon his mother's death). Her family, the Higford family, owned Alvington from the 17th century.

Burr was somewhat eccentric, keeping monkeys and snakes as pets. He commissioned Philip Charles Hardwick to build today's edifice in a Neoclassical style; the present mansion house was built using as much of the old material as possible that had been saved from the fire.

Burr died on 29 November 1885 at the age of 74, and the estate passed to his son, Higford Higford (who, rather than taking his father's surname, assumed the name of a distant ancestor). Higford only lived at Aldermaston for a few years before putting it up for sale. He sold Alvington in 1912.

=== Charles Keyser purchase (1893–1938) ===
The Keyser coat of arms

In 1893 the estate was bought for £160,000 (equivalent to £17,776,059 in 2025) by Charles Edward Keyser, a stockbroker and Fellow of the Society of Antiquaries. Keyser, who was born on 10 September 1847 and came from Hertfordshire had previously established a successful career in the City of London, having gained a Master's Degree in Law at Cambridge University. His accumulated wealth allowed him to specialise in his chosen area, and he became a distinguished figure in English church architecture, specialising in medieval churches.

Keyser's attention was drawn to Aldermaston by his sister Agnes, who said that the court reminded her of her stay at Sandringham House. Keyser seized the opportunity to buy the estate when it was put up for sale at the Hind's Head.

Keyser died in 1929, at the age of 81. His death certificate lists the place of death as Bucklebury. Keyser's estate was valued at £770,000, resulting in an Inheritance Tax of £150,000. The lessened agricultural income from the estate was then less than the cost of its maintenance in 1929. Keyser's wife, Mary died in 1938. Their son, Charles Norman, had no interest in running the estate and his heavy asthma led him to move to Adderbury, Oxfordshire. Muriel and Sybil, their daughters, had expensive taste with racehorses and ponies, and their brother sold the whole estate to a syndicate, Messrs Cribble, Booth and Shepherd, for £100,000 who auctioned it in lots at Reading Town Hall, beginning on 20 September 1939. Many of the lots were bought by their occupants. The house and its immediate grounds were bought by Associated Electrical Industries (AEI) for £16,000.

=== Airfield and opening of AWRE (1939–1965) ===
Despite the AEI purchase, the location was soon earmarked by the government for an airfield, RAF Aldermaston, to operate as a satellite field for RAF Andover. During World War II the land and house were requisitioned by the government as a barracks for the Women's Land Army, the USAAF HQ XIX Tactical Air Command was for some months stationed at the house and anti-aircraft batteries were located in the grounds. After the war, the airfield remained in use and was run by BOAC, who operated it as a pilot training academy then from 1947 to 1950 as a civilian airport. Air use was transferred to Blackbushe and Luton Airports.

After the closure of the airfield, the park was returned to AEI, which used it as a plasma research laboratory. They built the now demolished MERLIN reactor between the house and the lake – the first commercial scientific reactor in Britain, which was opened on 6 November 1959 by the monarch's husband, Prince Philip. The airfield became the UK's Atomic Weapons Research Establishment—later the Atomic Weapons Establishment (AWE)—for research, commissioning and de-commissioning of most such weapons. Periodic UK opposition to nuclear weapons was in the late 20th century was most prominently expressed in the Aldermaston Marches from London and High Wycombe, with its later marches organised in 1972 and 2004.

=== Commercial use (1965–2012) ===
Collier Macmillan Schools bought the north area of the park, including the manor house, in 1965. In 1967 the house became a Grade II* listed building; the parkland became Grade II listed in 1987. Blue Circle Industries bought the estate in the 1980s. They restored the house, and converted its usage into a hotel and conference centre. They also built the offices in the park, including Portland House, which won a Concrete Society award in 1986.

The house and grounds were purchased by Holaw (420) Ltd. in 1997, who under its former name, Aldermaston Manor, converted it to a hotel and conference centre. They appointed the Compass Group to operate these uses. The business was declared insolvent in 2012, and the house and office spaces were closed.

The estate is unoccupied and has been listed for sale since 2020; in 2025 the Victorian Society named Aldermaston Court as one of the UK's top ten endangered buildings.

As of February 2026 the land has been acquired by the Ministry of Defence for the nearby AWE to utilise.

== See also ==
- Grade II* listed buildings in Berkshire

== Notes and references ==
Notes
