= Aldermaston =

Village in Berkshire, England

Coordinates: 51.383°N 1.150°W

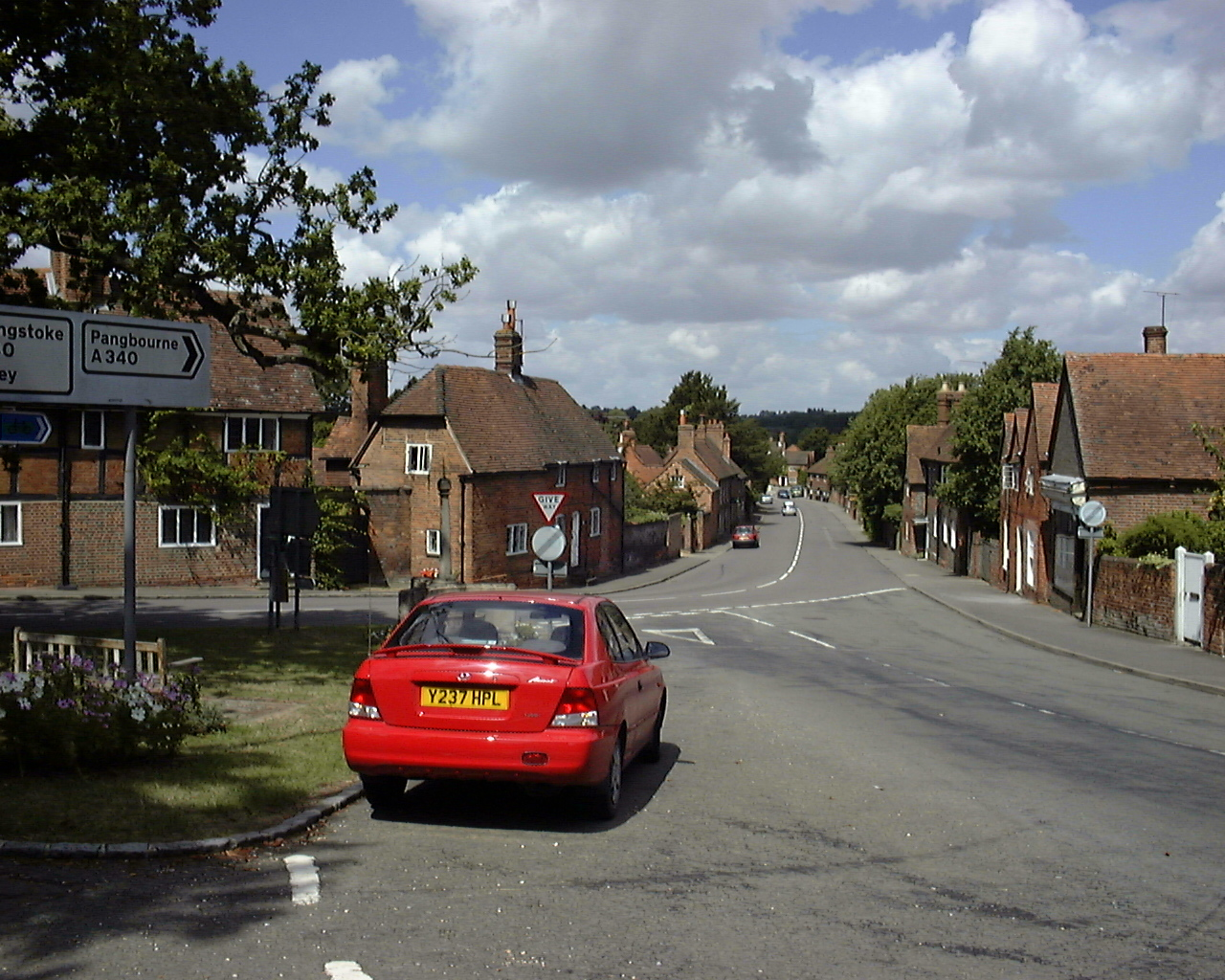
- The Street, Aldermaston

- Location within Berkshire
- Area: 13.4 km^{2} (5.2 sq mi)
- Population: 1,015 (2011 census)
  - Density: 76/km^{2} (200/sq mi)
- OS grid reference: SU5965
  - London: 46 miles (74 km)
- Civil parish: Aldermaston
- Unitary authority: West Berkshire
- Ceremonial county: Berkshire
- Region: South East
- Country: England
- Sovereign state: United Kingdom
- Post town: Reading
- Postcode district: RG7
- Dialling code: 0118
- Police: Thames Valley
- Fire: Royal Berkshire
- Ambulance: South Central
- UK Parliament: Reading West and Mid Berkshire

Aldermaston (UK: /ˈɔːldərmɑːstən/ AWL-dər-mah-stən) is a village and civil parish in Berkshire, England. In the 2011 census, the parish had a population of 1,015. The village is in the Kennet Valley and bounds Hampshire to the south. It is approximately 8 miles (13 km) from Newbury, Basingstoke, and Reading and is 46 miles (74 km) from London.

Aldermaston may have been inhabited as early as 1690 BCE; a number of postholes and remains of cereal grains have been found in the area. Written history of the village is traced back at least as far as the 9th century CE, when the Anglo-Saxon Chronicles showed that the Ealdorman of Berkshire had his country estate in the village. The manor of Aldermaston was established by the early 11th century, when the village was given to the Achard family by Henry I; the manor is documented in the Domesday Book of 1086. St Mary the Virgin Church was established in the 13th century, and some of the original Norman architecture remains in the building's structure. The last resident Lord of the manor, Charles Keyser, died in 1929. Aldermaston Court, the manor estate and house, was requisitioned for armed forces use during the Second World War.

The name "Aldermaston" is well known in connection with the UK's nuclear weapons programme, as well as the Campaign for Nuclear Disarmament. The Atomic Weapons Establishment (AWE), which develops, maintains, and disposes of the UK's nuclear weaponry is in the parish. Built on the site of the former RAF Aldermaston, the plant has been the destination of numerous Aldermaston Marches.

== Toponymy ==
The village of Aldermaston derives its name from Ældremanestone, Eldremanestune or Hedlremanestone, the Old English for "Ealdorman's Homestead". The Ealdorman—or Alderman—was a person of extreme importance, equating to the modern-day Lord-Lieutenant of the county. Although his country estate was in Aldermaston, he would have spent most of the time in the original county town of Wallingford. The Anglo-Saxon Chronicle states that the first known Ealdorman of Berkshire, Aethelwulf, fought the Danes with Ethelred of Wessex at the nearby Battle of Englefield in 871. Other documented names include Aldermaston ad Pontem (11th century), Aldremanneston (12th century), Aldremaneston (13th century), Aldermanston and Aldermanneston Achard (14th century), and Aldmerston (19th century).

== History ==
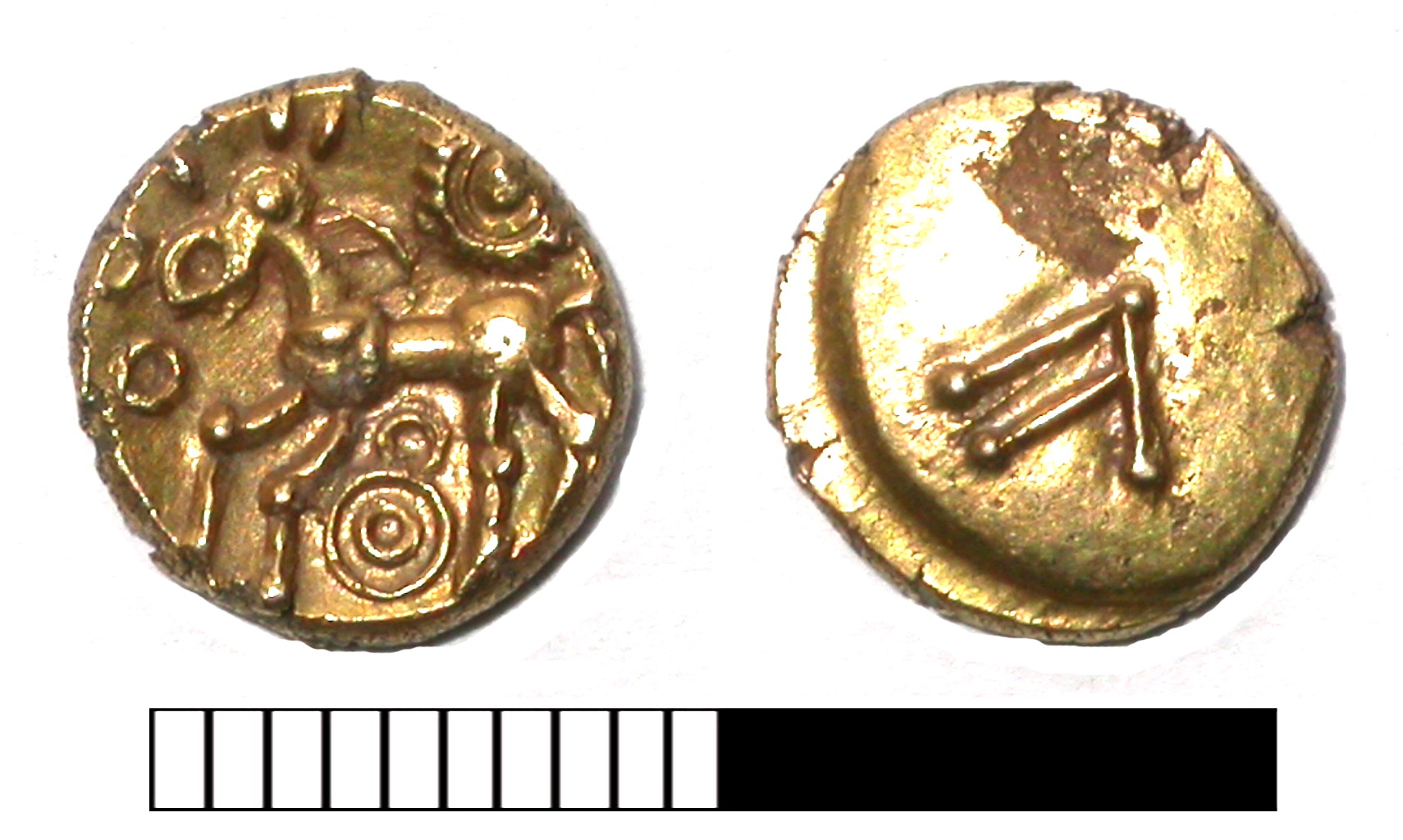
A gold Iron Age quarter stater coin from the reign of Commius, found in Aldermaston in 2013 and dated to c. 50 – c. 25 BCE

Evidence suggests that Aldermaston was inhabited in the 12th century CE, possibly extending back to 1690 BCE. Radiocarbon dating on postholes and pits in the area show activity from 1690 to 1390, 1319 to 1214, and 977 to 899 BCE. Wheat and barley grains have been found in these excavations. Tests show that most of the barley was dehulled, but that absence of such debris may mean that the cereal was brought in from other areas.

=== Middle Ages ===
Before the 1066 Norman Conquest, the land and properties of Aldermaston formed part of the estates of Harold Godwinson, the Earl of Wessex, who later became King Harold II of England. Harold's assessment of Aldermaston valued the village's 15 hides at £20 a year. As with much of the land seized by William the Conqueror after his arrival in England in 1066, Aldermaston was held in demesne. His Domesday Book of 1086 identified the existence of a mill, worth twenty shillings, and two fisheries, worth five shillings. During the rest of William's reign, and that of his son William Rufus, Aldermaston was owned by the Crown.

The history of the Lords of the Manor of Aldermaston Court can be traced to Achard D'Aldermaston, who was born in 1036. Six families have had lordship of the Aldermaston estate. In the 11th century, Henry I gave Aldermaston to Robert Achard (or Hachard) of Sparsholt. In the mid-12th century, the Achard family founded the church of St Mary the Virgin. In 1292, Edward I granted the right for the lord of the manor to hold a market in the village. Another charter was granted by Henry IV, with evidence that the market existed until approximately 1900. The Achards also established an annual fair to observe the feast of St. Thomas the Martyr on 7 July.

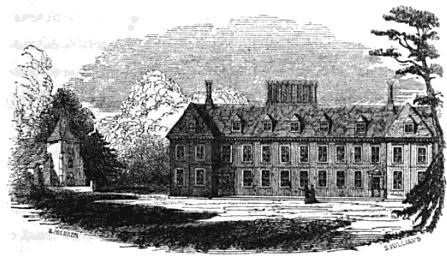
The 17th-century Aldermaston House, showing the building's proximity to the parish church

Aldermaston was held by the Achard family until the 14th century, when it passed through marriage to Thomas De La Mare of Nunney Castle, Somerset. The De La Mare family governed Aldermaston for approximately 120 years, until Elizabeth De La Mare whose male relatives predeceased her—married into the Forster family. In about 1636, the Forsters built a large manor house to the east of the church. The house incorporated parts of an earlier (15th century) house, including the chimney stacks. The Forsters' house was fronted by two porches, separated by a central section with seven bays. The porches had ornate Solomonic columns, similar to those at the University Church of St Mary the Virgin in Oxford.

The interior of the house featured a number of mythical statues, as well as artwork by Gaspard Dughet, portraits of William Congreve and Godfrey Kneller, and Tintoretto's Esther Before Ahasuerus. The house's Jacobean garden featured patterns of groves and avenues of oak, yew, Spanish chestnut and lime trees. In the early 18th century the Forsters oversaw the building of almshouses in Church Road. Built by R Dixon in 1706, the houses became known as "Dixon's Cottages". The manor passed through the Forster family until 1752, when the Forster lineage ended and the estate was inherited by Ralph Congreve, the husband of the last Forster's grand-niece. On Ralph's death a second-cousin of dramatist William Congreve inherited the manor. The Congreve Family owned the estate at the time of the 1830 Swing Riots. The rioters marched across Aldermaston, wrecking twenty-three agricultural machines. Workers were so frightened by the riots that they left their machinery in the open in an attempt to limit additional damage.

=== Victorian era ===
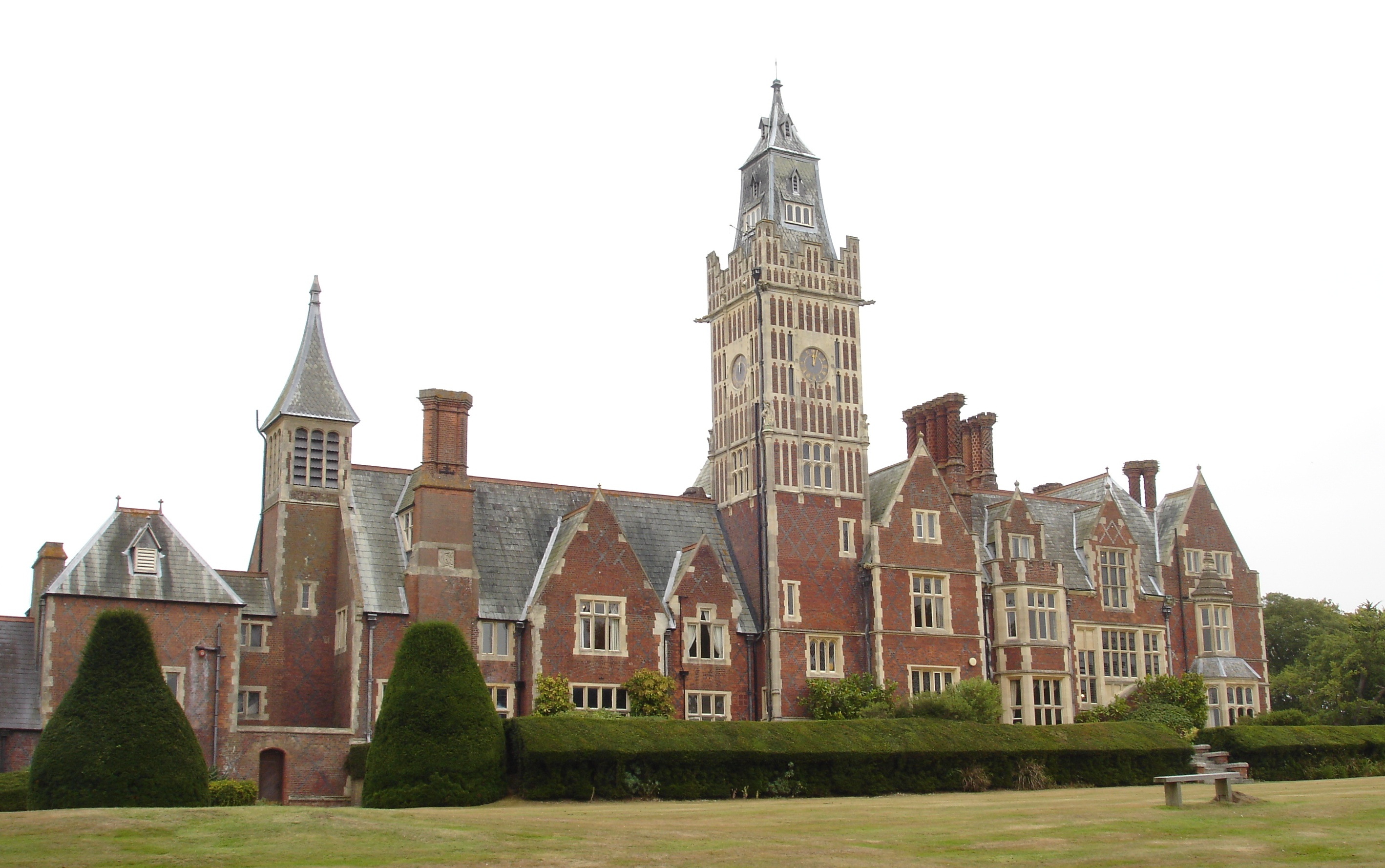
Aldermaston Manor was built in the 1840s

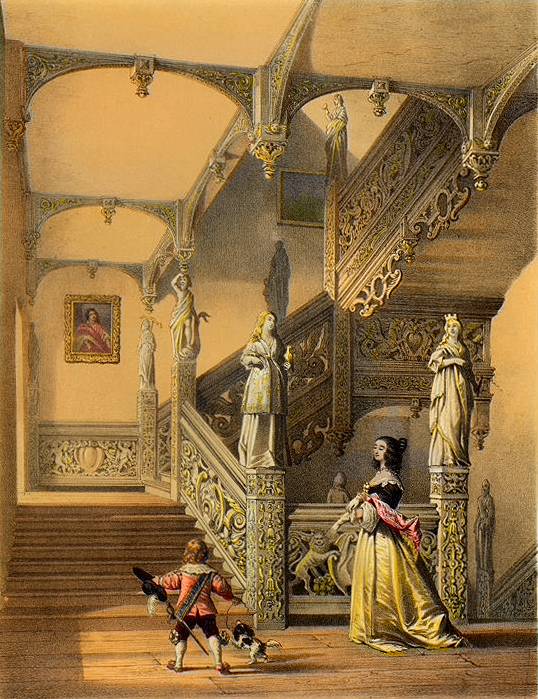
Joseph Nash's 1849 lithograph of the staircase at Aldermaston Manor

In 1843, the manor house was destroyed by fire, news of which was carried in The Illustrated London News. The estate passed into the Court of Chancery and was purchased by Daniel Higford Davall Burr. In 1848, Burr commissioned the building of a neoclassical mansion to the south west of the original building. Burr saved the 17th-century manor's wooden staircase, though all that remains of the building is a staircase to the cellar (which is now home to a colony of bats). By 1851 the new building was complete, costing £20,000 and having a Tudor-like appearance. Burr held the estate until his death 50 years later, when this was inherited by his son, who sold it in 1893.

The buyer was the wealthy stockbroker Charles Edward Keyser, who was preoccupied with the idea of keeping the village unchanged—or, as he described it, "unspoilt". He forbade advertisements, opposed all modernisation and refused to allow any expansion by the building of houses. He did, however, commission the building of a parish hall in 1897 and provided the village with a water supply, and the water fountain on the small village green was installed to commemorate Queen Victoria's Diamond Jubilee. Keyser oversaw the restoration of the village almshouses in 1906 and 1924, and defrayed the cost of a memorial oak tablet in memory of those killed in World War I. Of the 100 men from the village who served in the war, 22 were killed (the highest percentage of town population in the country). The tablet bears the name of each man lost in action.

During Keyser's lordship, John Marius Wilson's Imperial Gazetteer of England and Wales listed Adminston as a possible name for the village. On his death in 1929, his wife, Mary, continued to occupy the house until she died in 1938. The estate was auctioned off in September 1938, and many lots were purchased by their occupiers. The manor house was bought by Associated Electrical Industries (AEI) for £16,000. One of the houses in the village is recorded as having fetched £1,375. As AEI's chairman, Felix Pole became the de jure Lord of the manor upon their purchase of Aldermaston Court.

=== Post-World War II ===
During the 1940s RAF Aldermaston was created on the parkland at the southern end of the parish, with the Women's Land Army and the XIX Tactical Air Command stationed on the estate. After World War II, the manor was returned to AEI who built the MERLIN reactor on part of the land. The reactor was opened on 6 November 1959 by The Duke of Edinburgh. With the opening of the Atomic Weapons Research Establishment (AWRE) in 1950, Aldermaston became synonymous with a number of Campaign for Nuclear Disarmament (CND) marches.

In 1953, Pole stepped down as Lord of the manor and was succeeded by AEI's senior representative, Thomas Allibone. Allibone held the position for 32 years, until Blue Circle Industries acquired the estate in 1985. Allibone was succeeded by Tony Jackson, and the current Lord of the manor is Andy Hall. Blue Circle could not gain planning permission in the grounds of the court, so the MERLIN reactor was demolished to make way for Portland House. With a full redevelopment of Aldermaston Manor, the £14 million office development became Blue Circle's international headquarters and the complex was opened by Prince Richard, Duke of Gloucester.

== Governance ==
Historically, Aldermaston was a hundred, though for a period it was within the Theale hundred. By the 19th century, the hundreds had been superseded by other sub-divisions. From then on, Aldermaston was, at times, part of the Bradfield Poor Law Union and Sanitary District, and the registration sub-districts of Mortimer (late 19th century) and Bucklebury (early 20th century). It was at all times an ecclesiastical parish and acquired civil parish status in the 1890s.

The civil parish council, elected by local residents, is in the area of West Berkshire unitary authority. The electoral ward of Aldermaston includes the neighbouring parishes of Wasing, Brimpton, Midgham, and Woolhampton and is the smallest ward in West Berkshire by population. The ward's councillor is Dominic Boeck, who represents the Conservative Party. Aldermaston is under the catchment of Thames Valley Police and is covered by the Brimpton Neighbourhood Policing Team.

== Geography ==
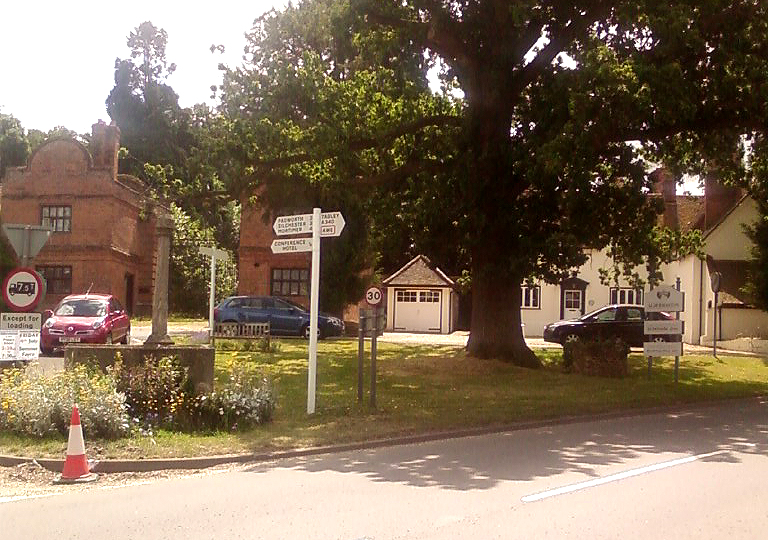
The Loosey with the fountain (left) and well (to the right of the oak tree) visible

Aldermaston is in West Berkshire, about 2 miles (3.2 km) from the Hampshire boundary. The village is 1 mile (1.6 km) south of the A4 road that links the parish with Newbury and Reading. The main road in Aldermaston, The Street, is part of the A340 road and links the village with Pangbourne and Basingstoke. The course of Ermin Way, the Roman road that linked Calleva Atrebatum (Silchester) with Glevum (Gloucester) via Corinium Dobunnorum (Cirencester) runs south of the village, but none of the road survives in the area.

At the southern end of The Street is a small triangular village green called The Loosey—possibly named after a "Lucy" who planted the oak tree which stands on the green. The Loosey is the site of a Roman well, discovered in 1940 by a cow that almost fell down it. The Loosey was previously home to the village maypole (which was often climbed by Daniel Burr's monkey) and a drinking fountain erected by Charles Keyser to celebrate the Diamond Jubilee of Queen Victoria.

The River Kennet and River Enborne flow through the parish, and their confluence is approximately 0.6 miles (0.97 km) north of the village. The Kennet and Avon Canal forms part of the parish's boundaries with Woolhampton and Padworth. Sections of Grim's Bank are in the parish. Part of the earthwork in the AWE complex survives at a height of 3.3 metres (11 ft) and with a ditch 0.9 metres (3.0 ft) deep. The village has a couple of Sites of Special Scientific Interest called West's Meadow and Aldermaston Gravel Pits.

=== Geology ===
The landscape of Aldermaston is influenced by Paices Hill and Rag Hill, which are extremities of the chalk formation the North Wessex Downs as part of the Thames Basin Heaths. The topography of the land in the parish generally slopes northward to the River Kennet. The soil in the parish is high in clay. Due to the parish's location within the Kennet Valley there is a high concentration of alluvium, with the content largely determined by the London Clay Formation, the Bagshot Formation, and the Bracklesham Beds.

=== Flooding ===
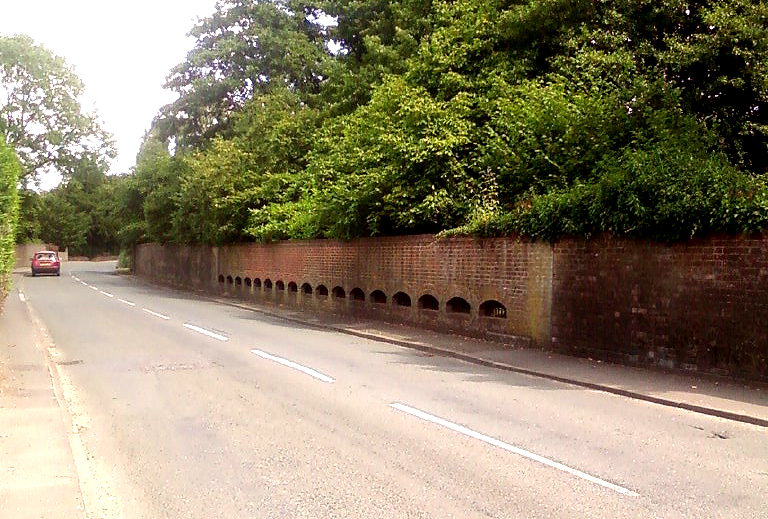
The flood grilles on Church Road (the rebuilt section of the wall is lighter than the older sections)

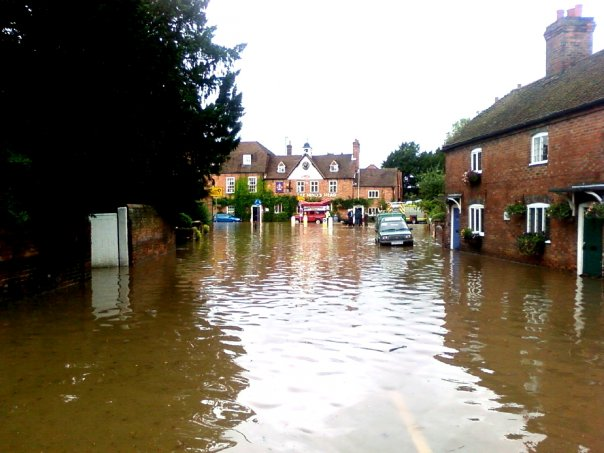
The 2007 floods affected the lower end of The Street

The quite flat low clay of Aldermaston's north has with exceptional rainfall led to flooding certain populous streets on three occasions—1971, 1989, and 2007. The flood in 1971 caused by torrential rain was exacerbated by the non-porous tarmac and buildings of the Atomic Weapons Establishment which managed for the first time to overwhelm its balancing ponds. This happened again in July 1989, when an average of 6 inches (150 mm) of rain was deposited across the parish in two hours; water rose 5 feet (1.5 m) above the ponds and broke through a brick wall. The destroyed wall was rebuilt with 17 grilles to avoid another build-up of water. A donation of £10,000 was given to the village by Blue Circle.

In July 2007, torrential rain flooded some of the traditional village centre and primary school. The storm coincided with the annual Glade Festival and jeopardised the event. The festival gates were temporarily closed while organisers assessed the flooding, which submerged one of the stages. The festival's car park was incapacitated, with thousands of revellers stranded in the village and surrounding lanes. The floods also hit the Church of England primary school, with the Royal Berkshire Fire and Rescue Service evacuating pupils and staff from the school in life rafts.

The evacuation used four rafts, rescuing pupils and teachers from the school through windows. The 165 people (140 pupils and 25 members of staff) were taken uphill to the parish hall, where blankets and sleeping bags had been provided. Thames Valley Police stated that the emergency services were "really stretched because of what happened over the county and the Glade event", that "the A340 road junction was two or three-foot under water", and predicted that "a lot of householders would be homeless."

== Demography ==
The 1831 census showed that 68% of the employed population of Aldermaston were working class or "labourers and servants". 20% were middle class ("middling sorts"), 10% were upper class ("employers and professionals") and 2% were unclassified. In 1887 the population of the parish was 528. By 1896, the population had grown to 585. The population fluctuated steadily around 550 until the 1950s and 1960s, when a population explosion resulted in the 1961 UK census reporting 2,186 residents in the parish. This coincides with the opening of the Atomic Weapons Establishment in the early 1950s, and the majority of this figure counts residents in the parts of Tadley within the parish of Aldermaston—between 1901 and 1961, 368 houses were built in the parish.

Historical population of Aldermaston
Year	1801	1811	1821	1831	1841	1851	1861	1871	1881	1891	1901
Population	672	678	653	636	662	783	585	?	528	655	482
Year	1911	1921	1931	1941	1951	1961	1971	1981	1991	2001	2011
Population	559	533	461	?	638	2,186	?	?	?	927	1,015
Census (1801–2001); Census 2011; Cassey's History, Gazetteer and Directory of Berkshire and Oxfordshire (1868)

A number of parish border changes occurred in the first half of the 20th century, including the net loss of 307 acres (124 ha) to Beenham and Woolhampton on 1 April 1934 alone. By 2001, the parish population had reduced to 927.

Population distribution in the parish (2005): Aldermaston Village Aldermaston Wharf Falcon Fields Ravenswing/Pinelands Raghill and other outlying areas

The 2001 United Kingdom Census identified that 99.3% of householders in the parish as white. In 2005 30% of parish residents lived in the village. Of the 70% outside the village, 30% lived at Aldermaston Wharf, 20% in the local mobile home parks, 10% in the Falcon Fields development and 10% in "other outlying areas". Falcon Fields is a housing development on the southern border of the parish, completed in the early 2000s. Ravenswing and Pinelands are mobile home parks near the Hampshire border. Raghill is an industrial area to the east of the parish, which has some light residential developments. The average age of residents in the parish is approximately 50 with 31.5% of residents in the 45–64 age group. The average age of residents of Aldermaston Wharf is 30.7, and in the mobile home parks the average age is 53.9. Of these, 53.3% were female. This is in contrast with the 2001 census data, which showed that 49.8% were female.

In 2005, 3% of the parish population were unemployed and 25% were retired. The retirement figure increased in the Pinelands and Ravenswing areas, with a statistic of 42%. Most residents' places of work are in surrounding towns, with their location in the parish largely dictating where to look for work. The 2005 survey identified that residents in the south of the parish (Falcon Fields and Ravenswing/Pinelands) travel towards Tadley and Basingstoke whereas those further north in the parish tend to find work in Reading, Newbury and London.

At this time, 52% of homes were owned outright, with 30% owned with a mortgage. Rented accommodation accounted for 12% of residences. The population at the 2011 census was 1,015, giving a population density of 78.37/km^{2} (202.99/sq mi).

== Economy ==
Historically, the main source of industry in Aldermaston has been agriculture. According to the 1831 census, approximately 66% of working men (aged 20 and over) were employed in some form of agriculture. The next highest industry by workers was "retail and handicrafts", which employed approximately 20%. Employment categories in the 1881 census were more discreet; just 20% of working men identified their employment as agriculture. 30% however, were listed as "general or unspecified commodities". In this census, women's employment was also documented. Of the 137 working women in the parish, 40 (slightly fewer than 30%) worked in domestic services, whereas 82 (approximately 60%) were of an unknown occupation.

=== Agriculture ===
In about 1797 a schoolmaster living in the village cultivated the Williams pear. The schoolmaster (either Mr Wheeler or his successor, John Stair) was the original cultivator, but the pear (a cultivar of the European Pear) was named after Richard Williams of Turnham Green, who grew several grafts of the original tree. On 5 December 1956, a plaque commemorating the tree was unveiled on the wall of the village school.

The Domesday survey records a mill in Aldermaston. Aldermaston Mill, previously called the "Kingsmill", supplied flour to Huntley & Palmers in Reading. The mill was owned by Wasing's Mount family throughout the 18th and 19th centuries. The family let the mill to Francis Webb (1797–1811), Mr Sherwood (1811–1820), Mr King (1820–1824), Mr Waldren (1824–1828), Mr Mathews (1828–1848), and William Gilchrist (1848–1856). Gilchrist (Mathews' business partner) bought the mill from William Mount in 1856 using money inherited from his brother's death the previous year. Owning it outright for approximately a year, he drowned in the River Kennet in 1857 after visiting the Angel public house in Woolhampton. Joseph Crockett purchased the mill in an auction the same year, before it was acquired by a Richard Sisling of Godalming in 1858. In approximately 1860, the mill was purchased by the Kersley family. Between then and 1885, it was operated by Anthony Kersley, a miller and maltster who employed "six men and a boy, a carter, several domestic servants and a governess". Kersley's son, also named Anthony, ran the mill until 1895. That year, Walter Parson bought the mill and operated it until approximately 1897. Charles Keyser subsequently oversaw the restoration on the mill building which "had been untenanted for upwards of three years". He let the mill out to a Mr Iremonger from 1901. Locally farmed wheat was milled at Aldermaston Mill until the 1920s. Iremonger used the mill until the late 1920s, shortly before Keyser's death. After Keyser had died and the Aldermaston estate had been divided and sold, his widow, Mary, approached Evelyn Arlott to run the mill as a tea room and guesthouse. The Arlott family purchased the mill in approximately 1939, after the death of Mary Keyser.

In 1939, there were seven farms on the Aldermaston estate—Forsters Farm, Village Farm, Church Farm, Upper Church Farm, Raghill Farm, Park Farm, and Soke Farm. These accounted for approximately 75% of the estate's land. Aside from these, there were six smallholdings within the parish but outside the land owned by the court. These were Springhill Farm, Court Farm, Strawberry Farm, Circus Farm, Ravenswing Farm, and Frouds Farm. Of these, Church Farm and Forster's Farm remain in operation. Upper Church Farm was originally known as Harry's Farm, after a William Harry who died in 1544.

=== Pubs and brewing ===
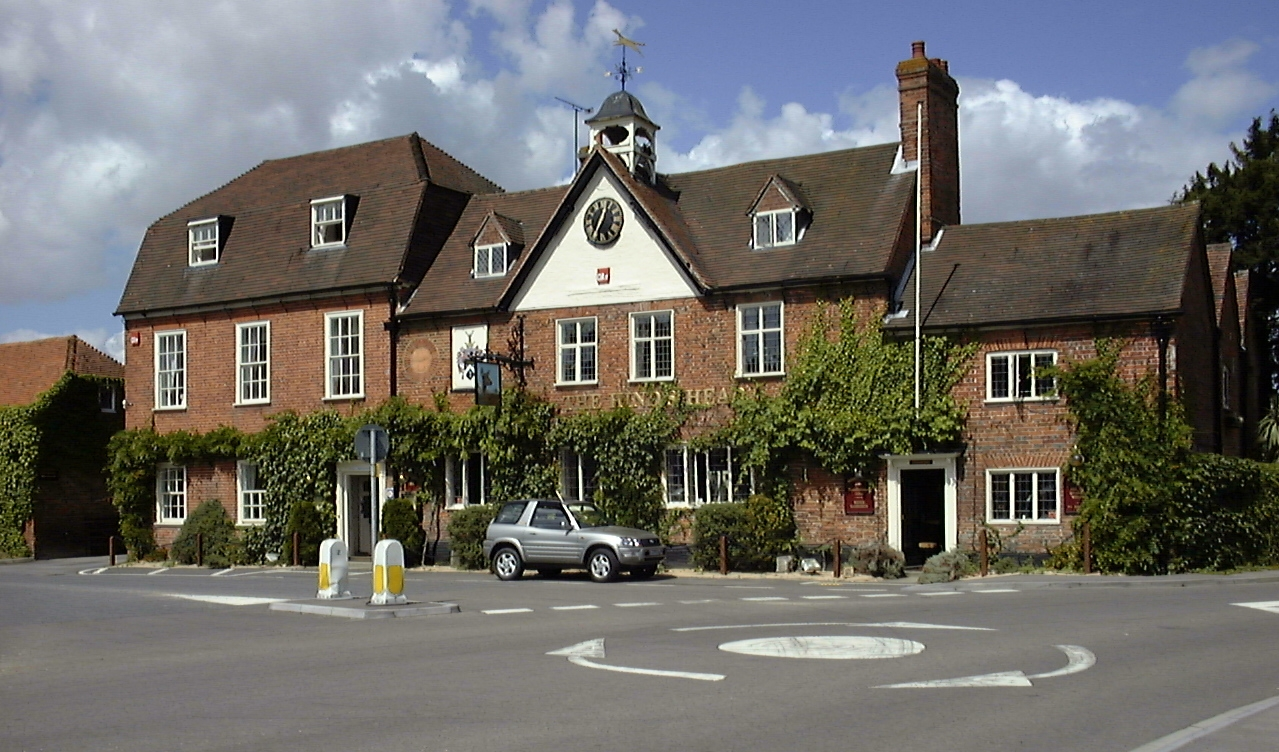
The Hind's Head Inn

The local pub is named The Hind's Head in honour of the Forster family crest. Built in the 17th century and originally operating as a coaching inn, the establishment was named The Pack Horse during the De La Mare and Forster lordships and The Congreve Arms throughout the Congreves' ownership. The building has a large black and gold clock set into the gable, and a small bell turret upon which is a gilt fox-shaped weather vane. The bell was intended to be rung as an air-raid siren during the Second World War. In the early 19th century the pub's signboard carried the arms of the Congreve family, as well as branding for a company named "Adams".

In the British Parliamentary Papers of 1817, the Committee on the State of the Police in the Metropolis reported evidence of a John Adams—a Reading-based distiller and hop merchant—who competed for business against H & G Simonds Brewery. By 1850, the pub brewed beer on-site; a brewery was built as an out-building behind the main pub building. John Knight produced beer at the pub for 40 years, selling it for 2d. The brewery building is still in existence, with the wooden louvres still operational. The building is now the pub's kitchen. In the 1970s, the pub was owned by Whitbread. In the mid-1990s the pub was taken over by Gales Brewery (having previously been a free house), later becoming tied to Fuller's Brewery on their acquisition of Gales in 2006. In the 1970s, the pub was home to the Kennet Folk Club.

At the rear of the pub is the village lock-up. Built out of red brick, the small single-storey building has a shallow domed roof. The inside of the lock-up measures approximately 7.5 feet (2.3 m) by 6 feet (1.8 m), and is enclosed by a studded door with a grille. It was last used in 1865 and its drunk inhabitant burnt himself to death trying to keep warm. The lock-up was designated as a Grade II listed building in April 1967. On 11 September 2010 the lock-up was opened to the public as part of the Heritage Open Days scheme. Another pub in the parish, The Butt Inn, is located approximately 1.25 miles (2.01 km) north-east of the village. The pub is named after the archery butts that were located in the fields opposite the pub. The Falcon Inn was on the southern border of the parish. The pub closed in 2009 and was demolished in 2011. The Aldermaston Brewery was established at Aldermaston Wharf in 1770, and was demolished in the 1950s. It was replaced with a cable factory, which was demolished in 1990.

=== Cricket bats ===
Old Village Farm (on Fishermans Lane) is the location of a wood yard, used since the 1930s to prepare local willow for the production of cricket bats. The trees are grown at Harbour Hill Copse, where 70 trees are felled annually for this purpose. There are approximately 1000 trees growing at any given time. The workers at the yard cut the wood into approximate bat shapes, then cure the wood in a kiln. The clefts of wood are then shipped to India, where the final manufacturing can be undertaken under moisture-controlled conditions. In the 1960s, Blue Peter aired a short documentary on the cricket bat production entitled "The Life of a Cricket Bat". It was presented by Christopher Trace.

The yard would take on three up-coming cricketers for the winter, in the hope that the hard work would "toughen them up" to get them picked for the England cricket team. One year the yard had help from Frank Tyson, Alan Moss, and Peter Loader. The following year they hosted three Davids—David Kaufman, David Spragbury, and David Gibson. The wood yard was featured on A Question of Sport, when cricketer Graham Gooch took part in the programme's "Mystery Guest" round. Gooch endorsed the bats made from Aldermaston willow, which were sold by Stuart Surridge. When he scored 333 runs against India at Lord's in the 1990 test season, the Turbo 333 bat, made from Aldermaston wood, was launched in his honour.

=== Pottery ===
In 1955, the Aldermaston Pottery was established on the main street by studio potters Alan Caiger-Smith and Geoffrey Eastop. The pottery was renowned for tin-glazed and porcelain wares, which used scrap wood from the Village Farm woodyard to fire the kiln. The pottery closed in 2006. It had previously scaled back its output in 1993 due to Caiger-Smith's partial retirement after the 1992 recession.

=== Atomic Weapons Establishment ===
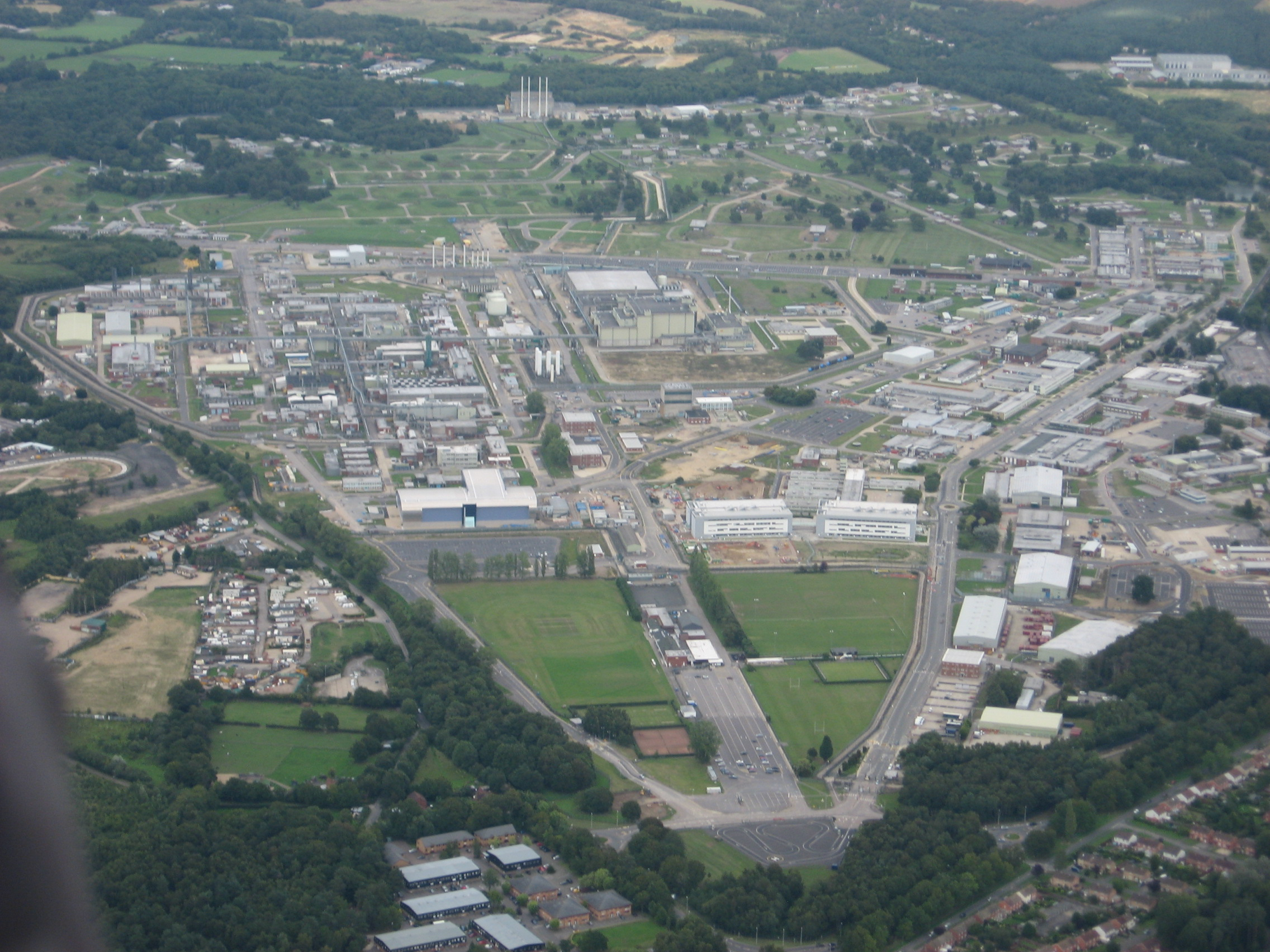
Aerial view of AWE

The Atomic Weapons Establishment (AWE), for which Aldermaston has become known, is less than 1 mile (1.6 km) south of the village. The establishment is where the United Kingdom designs and manufactures the warheads for its stock of Trident missiles, and where decommissioned and redundant nuclear warheads are dismantled. In April 1958, the first Aldermaston March was held. The march saw around 3,000 protesters march from London to Aldermaston over four days, with a total attendance of 12,000 at the establishment's gates.

The 50th anniversary of the event was marked on 24 March 2008 with the "Bomb Stops Here" protest, attended by Vivienne Westwood and Campaign for Nuclear Disarmament (CND) president Walter Wolfgang. The 2008 demonstration was the biggest protest staged by CND in ten years.

Until 2005, AWE discharged "pre-treated waste water" into the River Thames at Pangbourne via an 11.8-mile (19.0 km) pipeline which runs under roads and fields within the parish. A water processing facility was installed on-site in 2006, though the Pangbourne Pipeline remains in situ.

=== Other businesses ===
Lafarge Aggregates owns various sites in the parish. In 1974 the village won an appeal against Pioneer Concrete's application for gravel extraction near the village. Similar events took place in March 2003 when hundreds of local residents protested against an application of gravel extraction by Lafarge. Larfarge's initial appeal, in April 2003, was turned down by West Berkshire Council. A further application to extract aggregate at the Wasing Estate was due to be decided in 2010. One former extraction site, Butts Lake Quarry, is now a local nature reserve and the flooded lakes have been identified as a Site of Special Scientific Interest and is now operated by the Berkshire, Buckinghamshire and Oxfordshire Wildlife Trust (BBOWT). The reserve contains specimens of trees such as alder, cherry, hawthorn, oak, and willow. Examples of reeds present include typha latifolia, phragmites australis, mentha aquatica, and lythrum salicaria. Numerous species of bird nest in the reserve, including the common teal, shoveler, common kingfisher, water rail, and common nightingale.

Britain's first roadside petrol station was opened by The AA on the Bath Road near Aldermaston on 2 March 1919. The following year, one villager requested that a pump be installed by his house. "Chuffer" Ford, who lived in The Forge with his wife Olive, was told by Keyser that it must be "behind a wall and recessed". A hole was cut in the brick wall beside Ford's yard to house the Shell-branded pump. The location of this pump is marked by a square hole in the present wall. Ford's business offered other motoring services, with signage reading "vacuum, oil, and cycles". There is a number of small businesses in the village, including a florist and the village shop. In the 1970s the hairdressers was a music shop, which was opened by Terry Wogan. Before this it was a cooperative village stores started by Charles Keyser.

There are two business parks in the parish—Calleva Business Park (on the Berkshire/Hampshire border) and Youngs Industrial Estate on Paices Hill. The latter opened in the early 1980s, and is the location of Paices Wood Country Parkland, a wildlife project managed by BBOWT. In 2007 Aldermaston won the Business Category Award in the regional final of the Calor Village of the Year competition. The judges stated that the village "has a very successful business community" and that "local businesses are well-supported by villagers and in return these businesses support village activities". In addition to the business award, the village was announced as the Overall Winner of the "English Country Village of the Year" competition in 2006, as well as category winners in the "Building Community Life", "Business", "Young People" and "ICT" categories.

== Architecture ==
The majority of houses in the village were built between the 17th and late 19th centuries, including examples of Victorian Gothic architecture. Only one house has been built on the village's main street since the early 20th century. The parish hall, built in 1897, is predominantly flint and brick. Most of the houses in the village are Grade II listed buildings, and many were built using local red and blue bricks. In total, 51 structures in the parish are listed, including gatepiers, greenhouses, a tomb, railings and a wall, the village red telephone box (Note: Like other telephone kiosks in the UK, the one in Aldermaston no longer provides a public telephone but houses a small community library) and Aldermaston Lock.

== Culture ==
Since the early 1800s, Aldermaston has held a candle auction every three years. The open auction starts with a horseshoe nail driven through a tallow candle an inch below the wick and lit in the parish hall. The lot is the lease of Church Acre, a plot of 2 acres (0.81 ha) granted to the church in 1815 after the inclosure act, the Woolhampton Inclosure Act 1811 (51 Geo. 3. c. c). The proceedings are overseen by the vicar and churchwardens, who drink rum punch throughout the auction. Traditionally, the churchwardens smoked clay pipes during the event. The parish hall often holds other events, such as plays produced by the village's own amateur dramatics society. The society, known as The Aldermaston Players, have staged fundraising events in the village in 1996. In 1976, the parish hall hosted an episode of the BBC's Any Questions?.

The village, along with the neighbouring parish of Wasing, holds an annual produce show at The Old Mill. The show, which was previously held behind the Hind's Head pub, hosts produce competitions in approximately 100 classes. In the 1990s, a team of gardeners formed from the produce show entered the Chelsea Flower Show. They won a silver gilt in the Best Courtyard Garden Award in two consecutive years, for gardens named "Calma" and "Time Lords". The parish of Aldermaston forms a group with the local parishes of Wasing and Brimpton. The three share a monthly Parish Magazine featuring stories from churches, organisations, schools, businesses and various miscellany. Since 1957 there has been an annual performance of the York Nativity Play from the 15th century York Mystery Cycle. The play follows a script by E. Martin Browne with carols by William Byrd, Johannes Eccard, and Michael Praetorius. The performances are at the village church in early December, and the actors are local people who have appeared in the play for many years. In 1964, the play was recorded and broadcast by the BBC Home Service under the title of Star Over Aldermaston. One member of the production team was David Shute.

Aldermaston was mentioned in Plum Pie (1966) by P. G. Wodehouse—"Every now and then we march from Aldermaston, protesting like a ton of bricks... And then we sit a good deal." This was a reference to the demonstrations of the CND (the Aldermaston Marches) which took the form of marches from Aldermaston to London (apart from in 1958, when the march went from London to Aldermaston). This was an annual march from 1958 to 1963. Aldermaston was the original location of Glade Festival. The 2007 event was jeopardised by torrential rains and flooding but cautiously went ahead. In 2009, the festival moved from the area and was held near Winchester. Between 2006 and 2017, blues festival "Blues on the Meadow" was held in the village.

== Transport ==
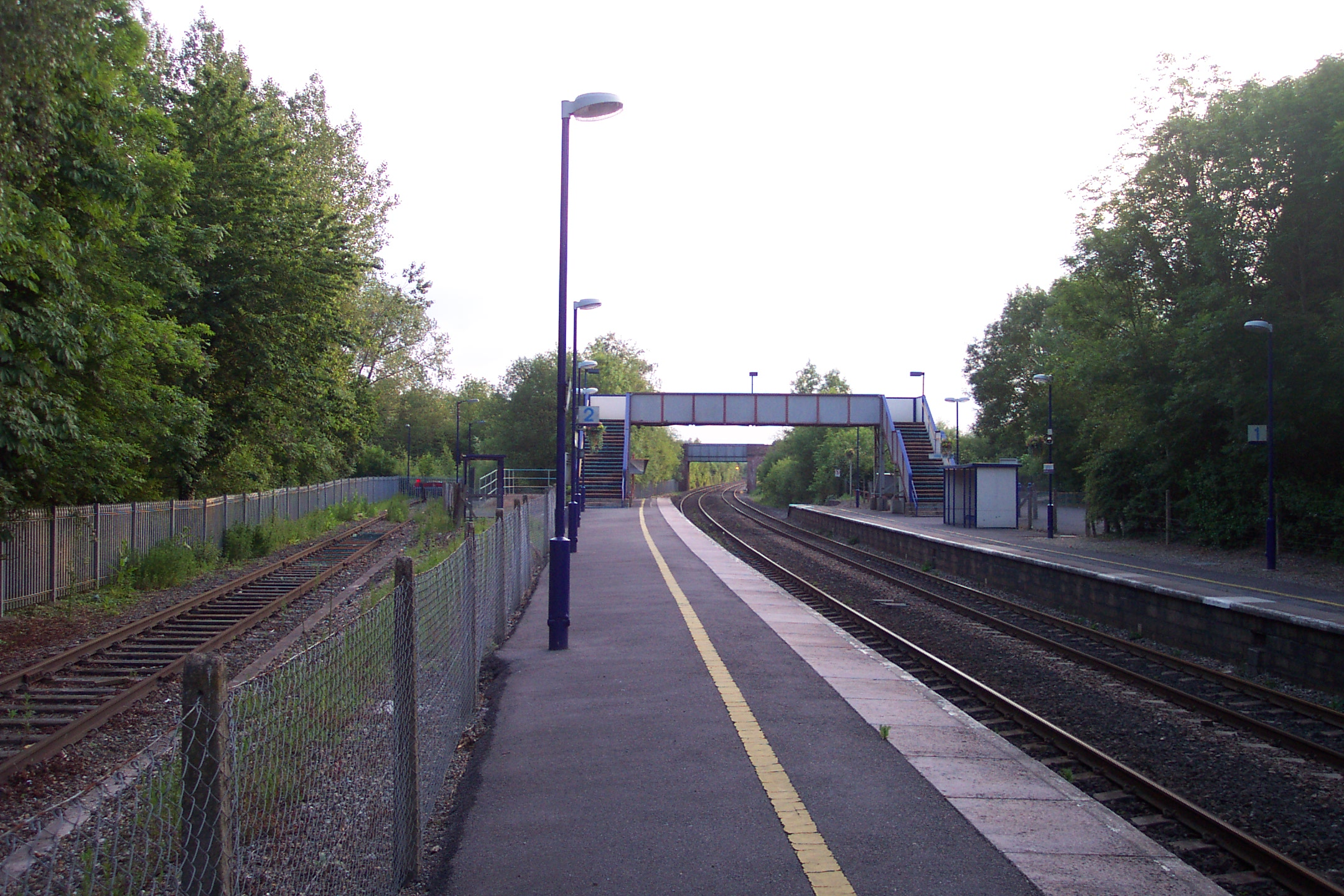
Aldermaston railway station, looking to the west

Aldermaston railway station is in Aldermaston Wharf, 1.5 miles (2.4 km) from the village itself. The station is managed by National Rail and served by Great Western Railway services between Reading and Newbury. The village is 1.5 miles (2.4 km) south-east of the Kennet and Avon Canal at Aldermaston Wharf, which provides waterway links to London (via the Thames) and Bristol (via the River Avon). The village is on the A340 road, and has nearby access to the A4 road and the M4 motorway.

A West Berkshire Council-run bus service, route 44, serves the village and provides a connection with Thatcham and Calcot The 2005 Parish Plan identified a need for a relief road near the village. A report was presented in 2009 evaluating the problems caused by HGV traffic through the village, and described solutions which included support from Newbury MP Richard Benyon. The nearest operating airstrip, Brimpton Airfield, is less than 1 mile (1.6 km) west of the village, within AWE's restricted airspace. RAF Aldermaston ceased to operate as a civilian airport in 1950.

== Education ==
The parish of Aldermaston has two primary schools. Aldermaston Primary School is a Local Authority-run Church of England school in Wasing Lane and has about 150 pupils. It was established in 1836 and originally located in Church Road, moving to the present site in 1988. The school uses the names of the manor's squires in its house system. Between 1992 and 2021, The Cedars (a private school) was located in original building of the Church of England school and had an enrolment of approximately 30. It reopened in 2022 as a day nursery. Alder Bridge Steiner School, although located in Aldermaston Wharf, is within the parish of Padworth. Padworth College is situated on the border of Aldermaston and Padworth parishes.

== Religious sites ==
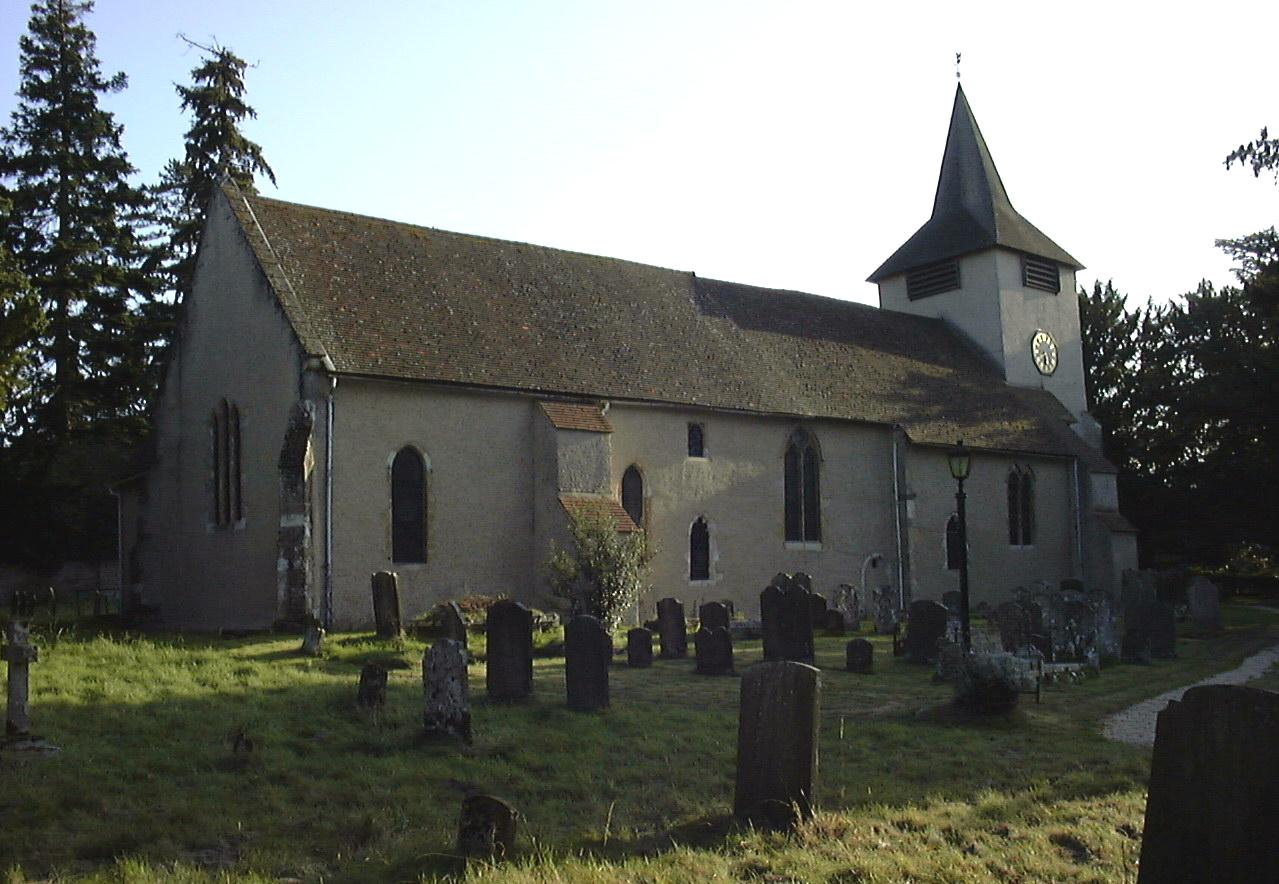
The Church of St Mary the Virgin is a 12th-century church with many alterations

The Church of England parish church of Saint Mary the Virgin was built in the mid-12th century. The Norman building was altered throughout the following millennium, particularly in 13th, 14th, 15th and 17th centuries. The 12th-century building now comprises the current nave, with additions seen in the Forster Chapel and chancel (13th century), the steeple (14th century), and vestry (17th century). The 17th-century Jacobean pulpit is an unusual heptagonal design. Various additions were made to the structure in the 14th and 15th centuries, primarily to the walls and ogee windows. A scratch dial was added to the south-west buttress in the 14th century.

The church features architecture by Edward Doran Webb and stained glass by Charles Eamer Kempe. The Forster Chapel, a lady chapel added to the south face in the 13th century, contains the alabaster effigial monument of Sir George Forster and his wife Elizabeth which was built in 1530. Evidence suggests that the chapel may originally have been a chantry dedicated to St Nicholas. The roundel windows in the north wall date from the 13th century and are the oldest glass in Berkshire. The tower has a peal of eight bells dating from 1681 to 1900. The current organ, which has 16 stops, was installed in 1880. Individuals buried in the churchyard include squires Charles Keyser (1847–1929) and Daniel Burr (c. 1811–1885), schoolmaster John Stair (c.1745–1820), and Maria Hale (1791–1879).

== Sport ==
Aldermaston has a number of sports teams. The village cricket team, Aldermaston Village CC, play at nearby Wasing Park. The club, which first played in 1786 as "The Gentlemen of Aldermaston", originally played at a pitch at Aldermaston Court. The ground was lost when the airfield was built. Sir William Mount, 2nd Baronet, the grandfather of British Prime Minister David Cameron, allowed a cricket pitch to be established on a portion of his Wasing estate. The original football club played next to the cricket pitch. The club's strip was sponsored by George L Heighton, the proprietor of the village shop. Aldermaston Rugby Club and A.F.C. Aldermaston both play their home games at the Recreational Society at AWE. Tadley RFC is in the parish, about 1.5 miles (2.4 km) from the village. Aldermaston Raceway, a banger racing and stock car venue, was located in the parish. A course for off-road 4x4 trials is close to the raceway.

== Notable people ==
- Thomas Allibone, Lord of the manor (1953–1985)
- Alan Caiger-Smith, the studio potter, founded Aldermaston Pottery
- Duncan Grant, painter, lived in the village with Paul Roche for the last few years of his life, and died in the village
- Felix Pole, Lord of the manor (1939–1953)
- Paul Roche, poet, lived in the village
