= Charles Edward Keyser =

British stockbroker and authority on English church architecture

Charles Keyser DL, FSA
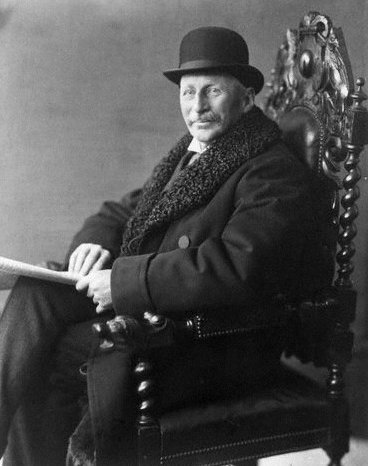
- Keyser in the 1910s
- Born: 10 September 1847
- Died: 23 May 1929 (aged 81); Aldermaston, Berkshire
- Resting place: Church of St Mary the Virgin, Aldermaston
- Education: Trinity College, Cambridge
- Occupation: Stockbroker
- Title: Lord of the manor of Aldermaston
- Term: 1893–1929
- Predecessor: Daniel Higford Davall Burr
- Spouse: Mary Emma Bagnall
- Children: 3
- Parent(s): Charles Keyser and Margaret Blore
- Relatives: Edward Blore (maternal grandfather); Agnes Keyser (sister)

Charles Edward Keyser DL FSA (10 September 1847 – 23 May 1929) was a British stockbroker and authority on English church architecture. In his later life, he became Lord of the manor of Aldermaston in the English county of Berkshire.

== Biography ==
Charles Keyser was born in Paddington, London, to financier Charles Keyser (d. 1892) and Margaret Blore (daughter of Edward Blore). Keyser attended Eton College, before studying law at Trinity College, Cambridge. He gained his B.A. in 1870 and his MA in 1873. Keyser joined Colne Valley Water, becoming the chairman. At this time, he lived at Warren House in Stanmore with his sister, Agnes.

Keyser Hall in Oxhey Village, named after its benefactor

Leaving Warren House in approximately 1890, Keyser bought Merry Hill House in Bushey. He purchased an old non-conformist chapel on Lower Paddock Road, in nearby Oxhey Village, to serve St. Matthew's parish. However, the location lacked popularity as a place of worship. He subsequently leased the building to the newly-founded Oxhey Conservative Club. When the building was extended in 1923, it was renamed Keyser Hall after its benefactor; Charles himself performed the opening ceremony.

While living in Hertfordshire, he captained the Hertfordshire County Cricket Club for eight years.

After his studies, Keyser worked in the City of London as a stockbroker, building great wealth.

In 1879, Keyser was appointed as a Fellow of the Society of Antiquaries due to his writings and lectures on English church architecture. In 1883, he wrote for the South Kensington Museum about buildings in Great Britain with mural paintings. He became president of the British Archaeological Association in 1906, a post he held until his death. In his obituary in the Association's Journal, he was credited with reviving the Association's fortunate and he was an extraordinarily active president, publishing many papers in the Association's Journal.

In 1893, Keyser purchased Aldermaston Court, a neoclassical mansion and estate in the Berkshire village of Aldermaston. The manor house was built in the mid-19th century by Philip Charles Hardwick, a student of Keyser's maternal grandfather. Keyser had been told of the estate's sale by his sister, Agnes, who said that it reminded her of her stay at Sandringham House. He was the benefactor of numerous projects in the village, including the renovation of the church, establishment of a water supply and drainage system, and building of a parish hall. While in Aldermaston, Keyser was involved with the South African Wars, establishing a convalescent home for wounded soldiers. He later equipped the parish hall for the same purpose if its use was necessary.

Keyser served as a justice of the peace in both Hertfordshire and Berkshire, and sat on both county councils. He was, at various times, deputy lieutenant and High Sheriff of Berkshire.

Keyser was a freemason and Knight Templar. He was initiated into Isaac Newton University Lodge, later rising to Grand Warden of England and Deputy Provincial Grand Master of Hertfordshire. He was also chairman of the Harrow and Reading divisions of the Conservative Association, and was treasurer of the west Hertfordshire association.

== Personal life ==
Keyser married Mary Emma Bagnall on 29 November 1871. They had one son, Charles Norman (1885–1964), and three daughters: Dorothy Margaret (1884–1963), Muriel Agnes (1886–1977) and Sybil Violet (1889–1966). In the 1891 census, all four Keyser children were listed as living at St George Hanover Square. In the following census, Keyser's daughters were recorded at 37 Portman Square.

== See also ==
- Aldermaston Court

== Sources ==
- Allinson, K (2008), Architects and Architecture of London, Oxford, Oxfordshire: Architectural Press, ISBN 978-0-7506-8337-1
- Anonymous (1913), Representative British Freemasons (REPRINT), London: Kessinger Publishing, ISBN 9780766135895
- Baker, T F T (1976), The Grove, Great Stanmore – Extracts from a History of the County of Middlesex, vol. 5, Provo, Utah: Ancestry.com
- Fawcett, J (1977), Seven Victorian Architects, University Park, Pennsylvania: Pennsylvania State University Press, ISBN 9780271005003
- Sermon, D (2005), Masonic Paintings in a Berkshire Church, London: Grand Lodge Publications, archived from the original on 18 June 2010
- Society of Antiquaries of London (1920), Proceedings of the Society of Antiquaries of London, London: The Society
- Stock, J; Stock, R (2011), Ancestors of the Kay, Star, Steel(e) and Stock Families, Milton Keynes, archived from the original on 2 April 2012

Honorary titles
Preceded by Henry Gold	High Sheriff of Berkshire; 1898–1899	Succeeded by Charles Thomas Daniell Crews
