= Paices Wood Country Parkland =

Country park in Berkshire, England

Coordinates: 51.371°N 1.160°W

Paices Wood Country Parkland is a country park on the edge of the village of Aldermaston in Berkshire, England. The parkland is under the management of the Berkshire, Buckinghamshire and Oxfordshire Wildlife Trust.

== Geography and site ==
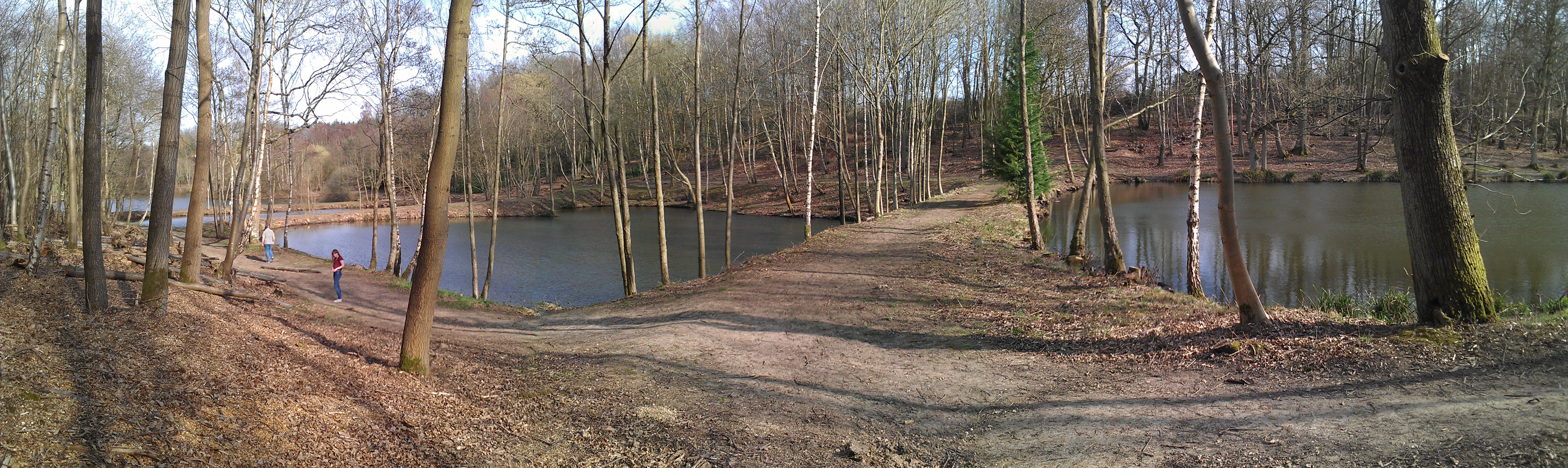
Lakes at Paices Wood Country Parkland

The site covers 35 hectares (86 acres). The parkland consists of woodland, grassland and several lakes located in a narrow valley. A medieval road borders the site to the north-west edge, creating a natural boundary with the neighbouring Wasing Estate.

There are seven lakes which vary in size from 0.4 acres up to 3.3 acres.

== History ==
Young Estates & Land Ltd bought what is now Youngs Industrial Estate and Paices Wood Country Parkland in 1961 from Turner & Hunter, a timber company. The land was purchased for the purpose of gravel extraction, with the lakes that are now on the site created for washing the gravel.

When gravel extraction finished in the early 1980s, the land was restored and became the site of the industrial estate and the rest of the site was developed into country parkland.

In 2014 the management of the parkland was transferred from West Berkshire Council to the Berkshire, Buckinghamshire and Oxfordshire Wildlife Trust.

== Fauna ==
The site has the following fauna:

=== Reptiles and amphibians ===
- Grass snake
- Slowworm
- Common frog
- Palmate newt
- Viviparous lizard

=== Invertebrates ===
- Grayling
- Purple emperor
- Common blue
- White admiral
- Silver-washed fritillary
- European peacock
- Drab looper
- Grizzled skipper
- Brimstones
- Comma
- Dingy skipper
- Small heath
- Treble-bar
- Lesser treble-bar

=== Birds ===
- Woodlark
- Northern lapwing
- Lesser spotted woodpecker
- Marsh tit

=== Fish ===
- Mirror carp
- Common carp
- Crucian carp
- European perch
- Common roach
- Northern pike
- Common rudd
- Tench

== Flora ==
The site has the following flora:

=== Trees ===
- Betula pubescens
- Castanea sativa
- Hazel
- Fraxinus excelsior
- Quercus robur
- Alder
- Prunus avium

=== Plants ===
- Hyacinthoides non-scripta
- Euphorbia amygdaloides
- Erica tetralix
- Erica cinerea

=== Fungi ===
- Laetiporus
