= James Davis (satirist) =

Welsh physician and satirist

James Davis (born 1706 or 1707 – 13 July 1755) was a Welsh physician and satirist.

== Life ==
Davis was born in Chepstow, Monmouthshire, Wales, and, on 18 February 1723 at the age of sixteen, he matriculated at Jesus College, Oxford. He obtained his Bachelor of Arts degree on 13 October 1726, advancing to Master of Arts on 9 July 1729. He then studied medicine, obtaining a Bachelor of Medicine degree on 7 December 1732. He then worked as a physician in Devizes, Wiltshire until his death there on 13 July 1755.

His work Origines Divisianae, or, The antiquities of the Devizes in some familiar letters to a friend wrote in the years 1750 and 1751 was published in 1754. It caricatured the antiquarian studies of William Stukeley (who pioneered the archeological investigation of Stonehenge) and his contemporaries, presenting various fancies as facts of local history. Some of these tricks deceived later writers.

Davis showed his sense of humour with turns of phrase such as:

An old woman, who shew'd Lord Bathurst's fine place by Cirencester, was ask'd by a Gentleman that came to see it—Pray what building is that?—Oh Sir, that is a ruin a thousand years old, which my Lord built last year; and he proposes to build one this year half as old again.

and finished his book by writing:

The foregoing papers were wrote by no man living,—for the Author dy'd some months ago. He long entertain'd a disrelish for the modern sort of scholarship and was not unwilling for these papers to go to the press to prevent many larger from going there.
