= Common eyebright =

Common eyebright is a common name for several plants in the genus Euphrasia and may refer to:

- Euphrasia nemorosa
- Euphrasia rostkoviana
