= MERLIN reactor =

Nuclear reactor in the United Kingdom

Coordinates: 51.3800°N 1.1461°W

MERLIN reactor was a 10MWt pool-type research reactor at Aldermaston Court, Aldermaston, Berkshire, England which operated from 6 November 1959 until 1962.

It was privately owned and operated by Associated Electrical Industries. It was opened by Prince Philip on 6 November 1959. The head of the reactor was Alan James Salmon, then aged 36 who had worked for AEI since leaving the RAF and had spent two years at the Atomic Energy Research Establishment studying reactor design before joining AEI Aldermaston.
