= Church of St Mary the Virgin, Aldermaston =

Church of St Mary the Virgin
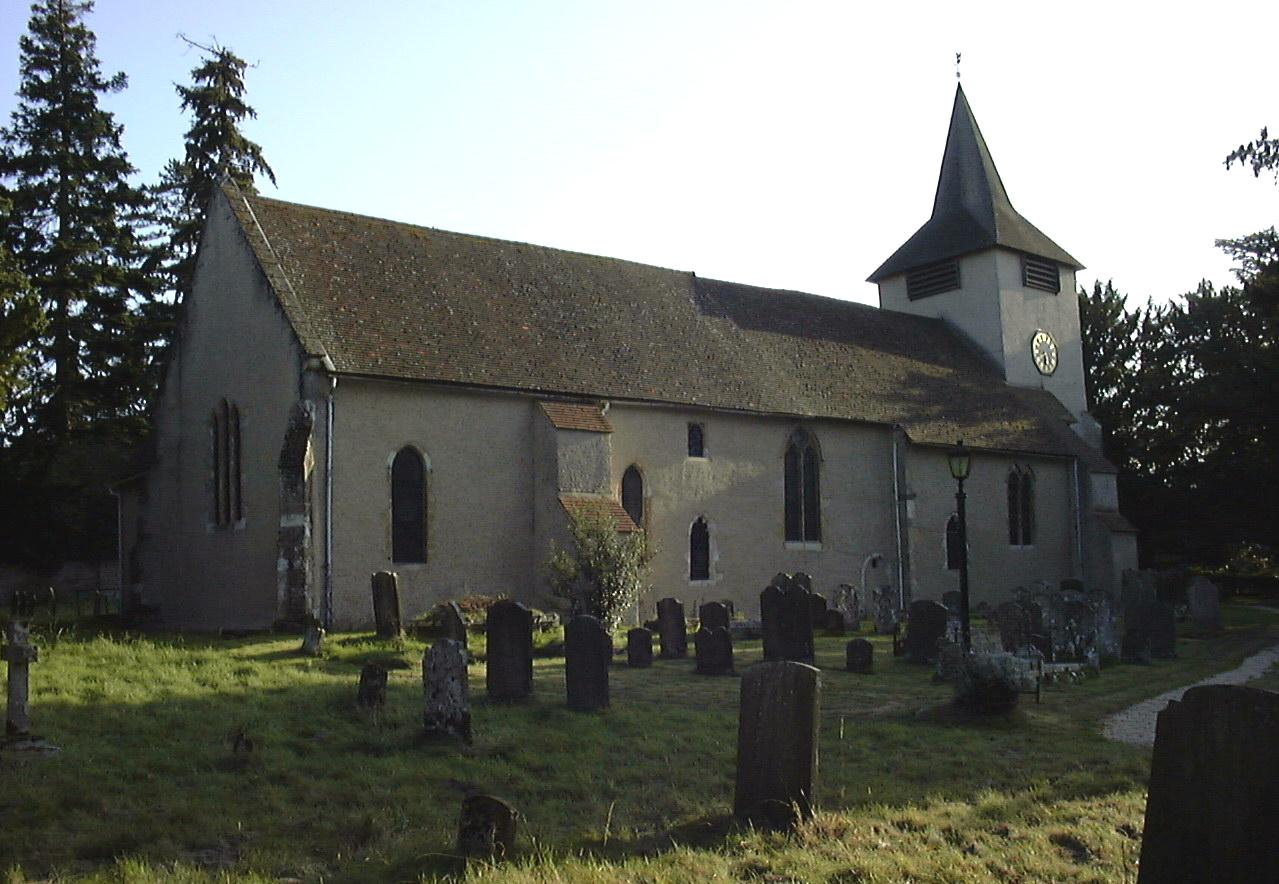
- A view of the church from the graveyard

- Location of the church within Berkshire
- 51.3807°N 1.1442°W
- OS grid reference: SU 59655 64975
- Location: Church Road, Aldermaston, Berkshire
- Country: England
- Denomination: Anglican

History
- Founded: Mid 12th century
- Dedication: St Mary the Virgin

Architecture
- Functional status: Active
- Heritage designation: Grade I
- Style: Norman

Administration
- Diocese: Oxford
- Archdeaconry: Berkshire
- Deanery: Bradfield
- Parish: Aldermaston

The Church of St Mary the Virgin, Aldermaston, is the Church of England parish church of Aldermaston in Berkshire. The church, which is dedicated to St Mary, dates from the mid-12th century and has examples of Norman and Jacobean architecture. The building has had a number of extensions, particularly in the 13th, 14th, 15th and 17th centuries.

== History ==
The Church of England parish church was built in the mid 12th century. The Norman building was altered throughout the following millennium. The 12th-century building now comprises the current nave, with additions seen in the Forster Chapel and chancel (13th century), the steeple (14th century), and vestry (17th century). The 17th-century Jacobean pulpit is an unusual heptagonal design. Various additions were made to the structure in the 14th and 15th centuries, primarily to the walls and ogee windows. A scratch dial was added to the south-west buttress in the 14th century.

St Mary's Church was established in the 12th century, and has seen numerous additions and increases in size

In 1896 Charles Keyser oversaw and funded the church's renovation, which was guided by Edward Doran Webb. Alongside the routine repairments to paving and roofing, the renovation uncovered evidence of an early water drainage system in the sill of a window. This was converted into a piscina. Also, the repairs to the walls of the nave showed that they were lined plaster upon a wooden framing – this was removed, and after repairs, the walls were decorated with tempera artwork. The stained glass in the chancel is the work of C.E. Kempe.

Further repair work to the roof and tower was undertaken in the 1950s, with surveying overseen by Frederick Ernest Briant Ravenscroft of Reading. Ravenscroft was in his 70s when the work began and died before the work was finished. The completion documents were signed off by his fellow architect George William Judd. The church font dates from the mid 19th century, and the lectern is a memorial to the Second World War.

On 11 September 2010, the church was opened to the public as part of the Heritage Open Days scheme. The current rector is Jane Manley.

== Forster Chapel ==
The south transept of the church was added in the 13th century. Now called the Forster Chapel, the lady chapel contains the alabaster effigial monument of Sir George Forster and his wife Elizabeth, which was built in 1530. Part of the effigy was damaged when part of the church's roof collapsed; George's face, however, remained undamaged. The chapel may originally have been a chantry dedicated to St Nicholas.

The two roundels in the north window portray the Annunciation the Coronation of the Virgin. These date from the 13th century and are the oldest glass in Berkshire.

== Bells ==
The church tower has a ring of eight bells. The oldest are the fourth and sixth bells, which were founded in 1681 by Henry Knight of Reading. The seventh dates from 1786 and was made by W & T Mears of the Whitechapel Bell Foundry. The third and fifth were cast by Mears in 1860. The second bell was cast by Warner in 1895, with the treble and tenor bells being cast five years later.

Between 1900 and 2005 the church rang 210 peals. In 1977, the church rang a quarter-peal (1260 changes) of Plain Bob Doubles for the Silver Jubilee of Elizabeth II. On 9 July 1979, a peal of Grandsire Triples was run to mark the Queen and the Duke of Edinburgh's visit to AWRE. A peal of Oxford Bob Triples was rung in on 15 November 1980 to commemorate the new vicar, Richard Millar. The peal lasted 2 hours and 47 minutes.

== Organ ==
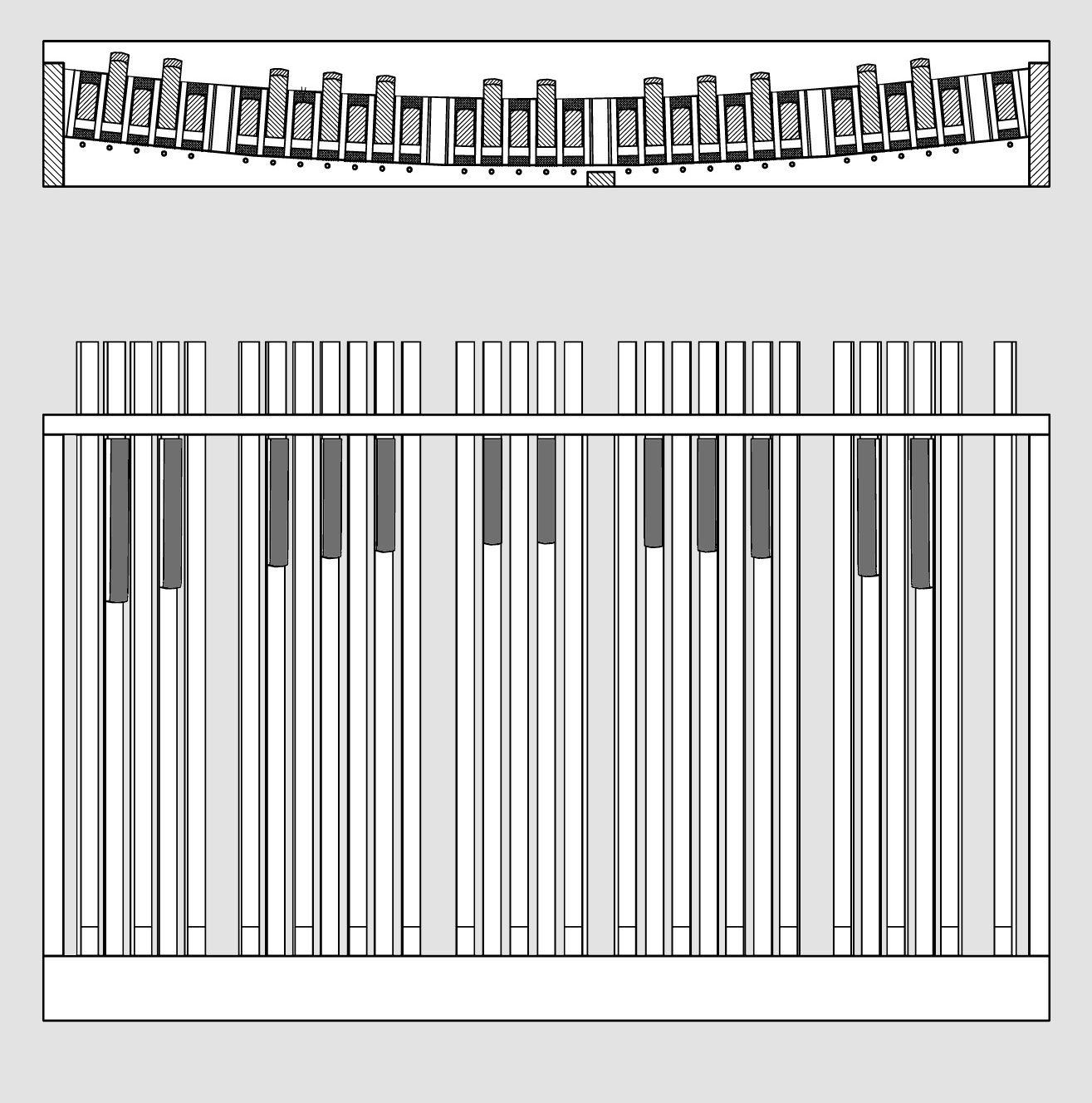
Diagram of a concave-parallel pedalboard layout, similar to the one in Aldermaston

The present organ at St Mary's church is located in the south chancel and was built in 1880 by Martin & Coate of Oxford. The organ has 9 stops, with pipes of spotted metal (an alloy of lead and tin):

Division	Stop	Length
Pedal	Bourdon	16'
Great	Open Diapason	8'
Great	Stopped Diapason	8'
Great	Dulciana	8'
Great	Principal	4'
Swell	Horn Diapason	8'
Swell	Gamba	8'
Swell	Lieblich Gedact	8'
Swell	Gemshorn	4'
Swell	Tremulant	

The organ has four couplers – swell to pedal, swell to great, swell octave to great, and great to pedal. The wind system uses a Discus electric blower. The pedal keyboard is laid out in a concave-parallel design.

In 1938, the tremulant was added to the swell division. In addition to this, the swell to great coupler was changed and detail to the console was added. In 1997, the organ was cleaned and renovated by Foster Waite of Newbury, but no changes were made.

== Notable burials ==
Maria Hale (occasionally written as Martha Hale) was born in 1791, and lived in Park Cottage on the edge of the court's parkland. It was rumoured that she was a witch, and would turn herself into a hare and sit outside the Falcon pub in Tadley to learn gossip. The hare was shot in the leg by the gamekeeper, and Hale reportedly had a limp thereafter. Other rumours suggest that she cursed villagers' gardens when they refused her request for flowers, and that she bestowed illness upon her son when he left home for Windsor so that he would return.

The United Kingdom Census of 1871 listed Hale as living in Mortimer. At that time the census divided the county into subdivisions, and Aldermaston was within the Mortimer division. She died 8 years later in 1879, and was buried south-west of the church's entrance beside a yew tree. Her coffin was supposedly weighed down with stones and bricks, and the gravediggers jumped on the grave to ensure that she would never rise. It is rumoured that placing a pin in the church door and running around the church three times will summon her ghost.

Charles Keyser, Daniel Burr, and John Stair are buried in the Aldermaston churchyard.

== Sources ==
- Aldermaston Parish Council (2007), Aldermaston – A Brief History (PDF), Aldermaston, Berkshire, archived from the original (PDF) on 9 January 2016
- British Institute of Organ Studies (2008), "Berkshire, Aldermaston; St. Mary the Virgin, Church Road", The National Pipe Organ Register, Birmingham
- Church of England (2010), "Bradfield Deanery (Oxford Diocese)", A Church Near You, London, archived from the original on 27 September 2012
- Church Plans Online (2006), ALDERMASTON, St. Mary the Virgin (1952–1953), Berkshire, London: Lambeth Palace Library, archived from the original on 28 September 2011
- Cox, B (1977), Souvenir Brochure of the Silver Jubilee of Her Majesty Queen Elizabeth the Second (PDF), Aldermaston, Berkshire: Silver Jubilee Committee
- Dibblee, Martha (2002), Organ Pipe Metallurgy (PDF), Portland, OR: American Chemical Society
- Ford, D N (2003), "Aldermaston St Mary's Church", Royal Berkshire History, Finchampstead, Berkshire: Nash Ford Publishing
- Ford, D N (2005), "Aldermaston", Royal Berkshire History, Finchampstead, Berkshire: Nash Ford Publishing
- FreeCEN (2009), "Coverage for Berkshire", 19th Century UK Census Transcription Project, archived from the original on 25 December 2010
- Genes Reunited (2010), Maria Hale in the 1871 Census, London: Friends Reunited
- Garvey, J (13 December 2010), Tradition continues in Aldermaston, Newbury, Berkshire: Newbury Weekly News, archived from the original on 17 December 2010
- Heritage Open Days (2010a), Village Lock-Up, London: English Heritage, archived from the original on 11 September 2010
- Martin, S A; Braithwaite, R; Jeffcoate, P; Girling, T; Moore, C (2005), Memories of Life in an English Country Village, Aldermaston, Berkshire: The Book Project, ISBN 0-9549636-0-1
- Page, W; Ditchfield, P H (1923), A History of the County of Berkshire, vol. 3, London: Victoria County History
- Reader's Digest Association (1990), Book of British Villages, London: Reader's Digest, ISBN 0-276-42018-7, OCLC 35330841
- Thatcham Methodist Church (2010). "Minutes of the Church Council Meeting Held on Tuesday 19th October 2010" (PDF). English Heritage (FTP). Thatcham, Berkshire. (To view documents see Help:FTP)
- Timmins, G (2000), Aldermaston: A Village History, Winchester, Hampshire: Hampshire County Council
- Whitechapel Bell Foundry (2004), Identifying Old Whitechapel Bells, London
