= Geoffrey Eastop =

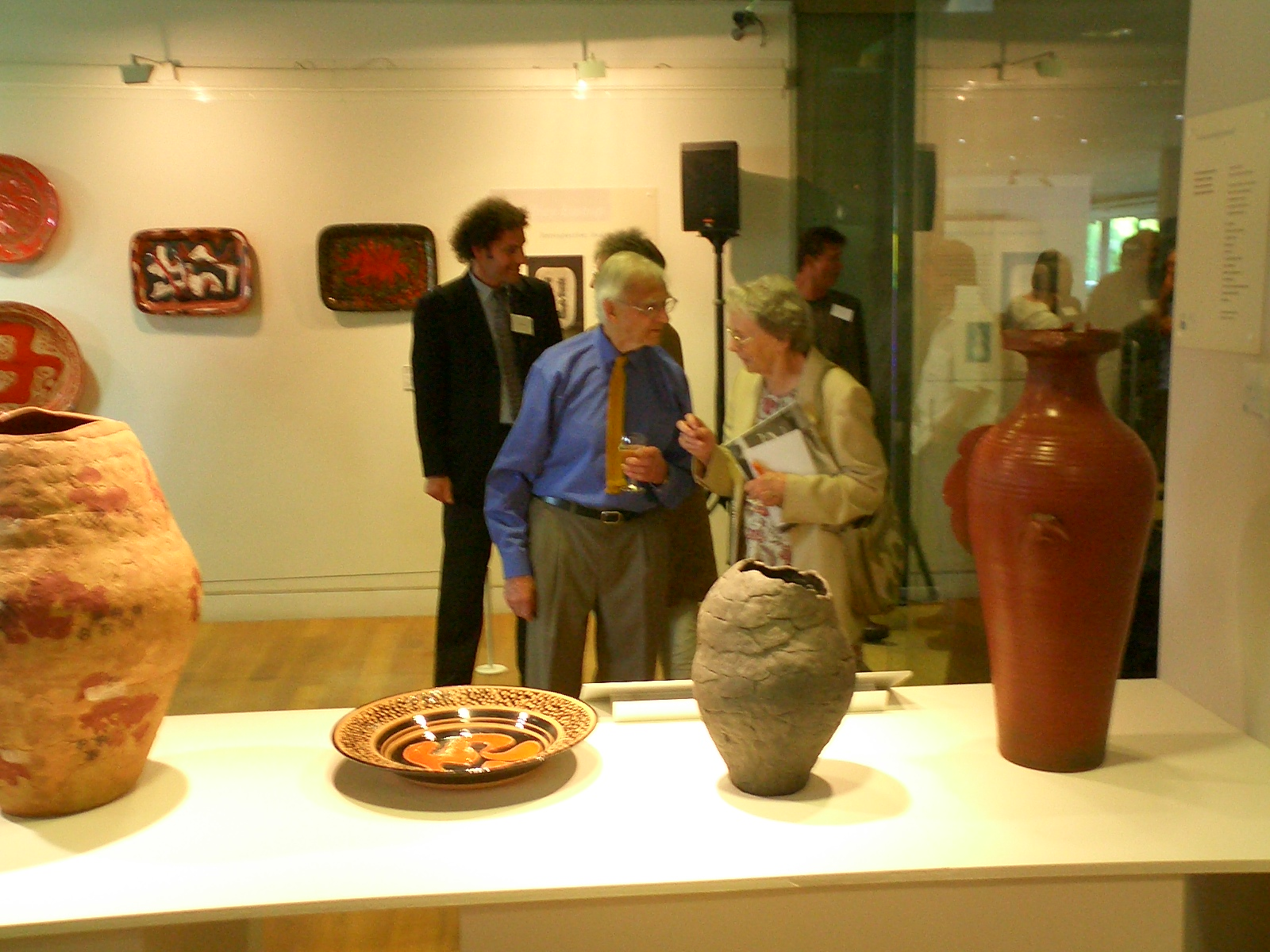
Geoffrey Eastop at an exhibition of his work at the River and Rowing Museum, Henley-on-Thames, England, in 2005.

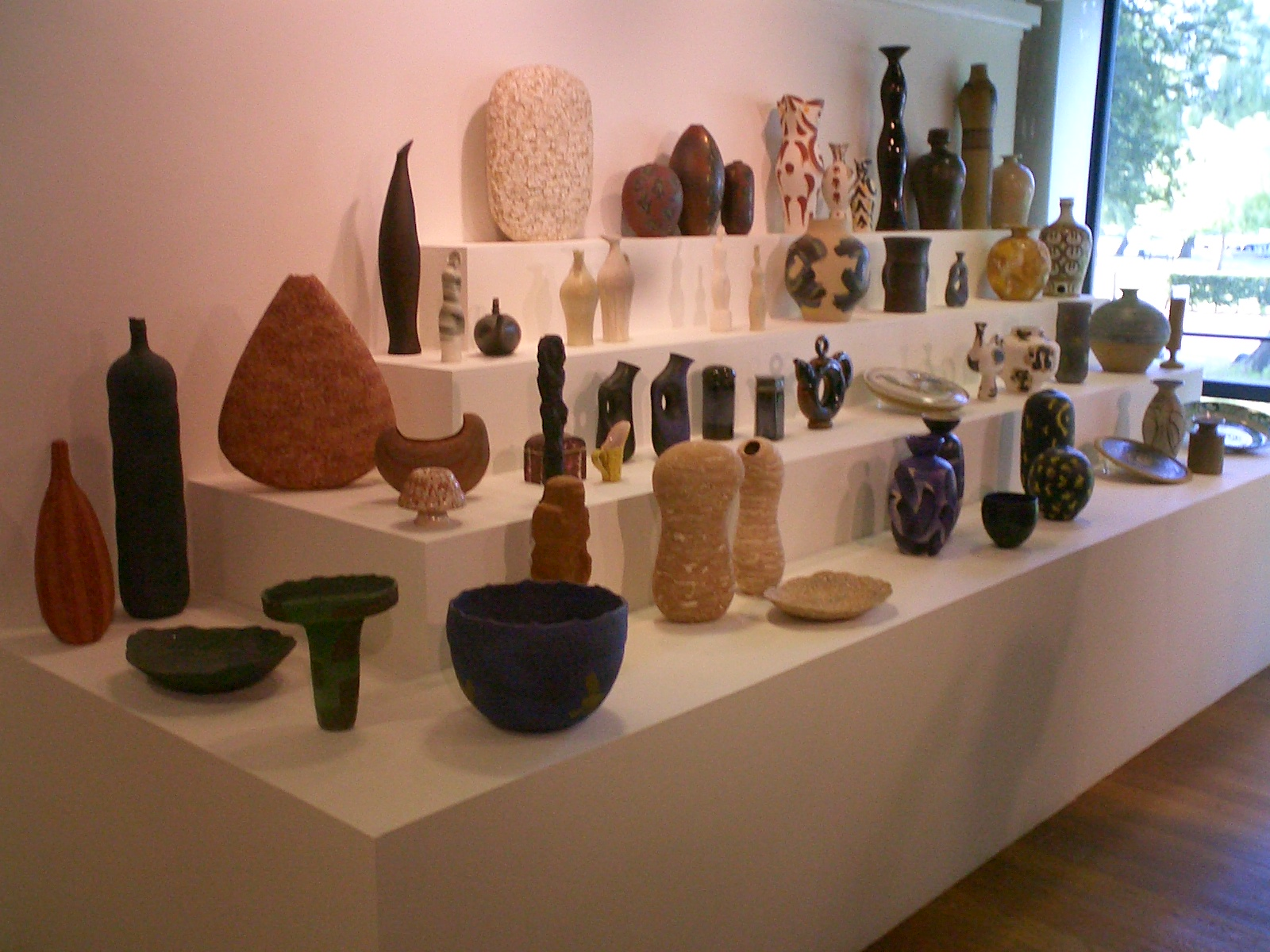
Pots by Geoffrey Eastop, part of an exhibition of his work at the River and Rowing Museum in 2005.

Geoffrey Eastop (16 January 1921 – 25 December 2014) was an English potter.

== Biography ==
Geoffrey Eastop was born on 16 January 1921, in London. He studied at the Croydon School of Art; Goldsmiths' College; and at the Académie Ranson in Paris.

During World War II, Eastop served as an officer in the Royal Artillery, seeing action in the Netherlands and being lucky to survive. After the war, he spent a year at the Odney Pottery in Cookham, Berkshire. From 1956, he collaborated with Alan Caiger-Smith during the early years of the Aldermaston Pottery (established in 1955) in the village of Aldermaston, staying there for six years. He then started his own pottery in Padworth. He remained in the same area around south Berkshire throughout his working life, finally being based near Newbury from 1985.

Eastop was a potter throughout his working life and collaborated with the artist John Piper, sometimes working at Piper's family home at Fawley Bottom in south Buckinghamshire. He first met Piper in 1968 and they started working together in 1969. Eastop set up a pottery at Piper's home in Fawley Bottom and the partnership lasted until 1985. Eastop made the pots and Piper decorated them. From 1985, Eastop established his own pottery in the village of Ecchinswell near Kingsclere, Hampshire.

Eastop's work has been exhibited at the Victoria and Albert Museum, London and the Fitzwilliam Museum, Cambridge. In 2005, he had a solo exhibition of his work at the River and Rowing Museum in Henley-on-Thames, Oxfordshire. Examples of his work are in the Ashmolean Museum (Oxford), Portsmouth City Museum, Reading Museum, and Southampton City Art Gallery.

Eastop lived at Ecchinswell near Kingsclere in Hampshire with his wife, Pat Eastop MBE (died 2014). They had three sons and one daughter. Eastop died at Oak Lodge, Oakley, on Christmas Day, 2014.
