= National Art Library =

Library in the Victoria and Albert Museum

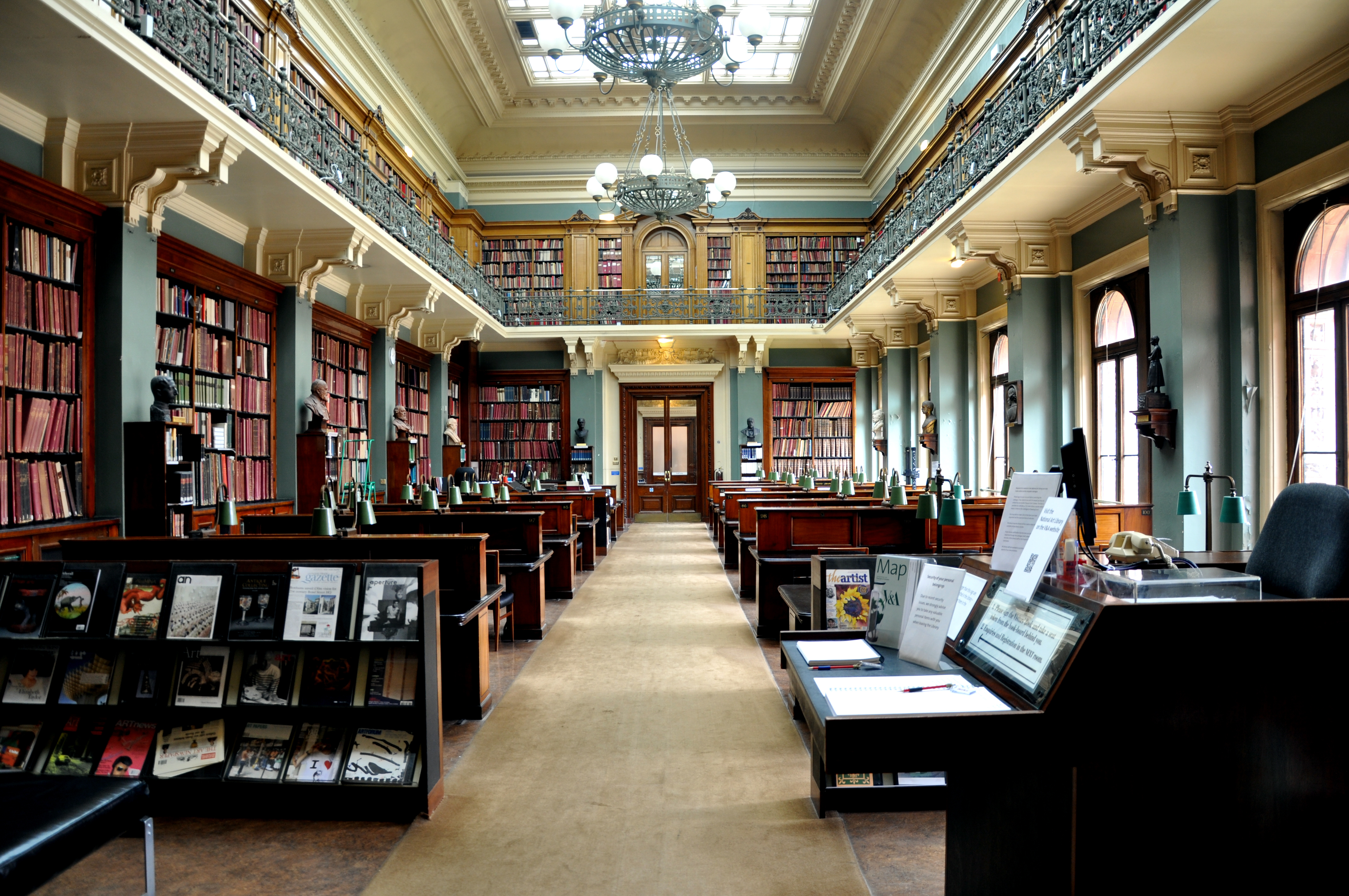
- 51°29′49″N 00°10′19″W
- Location: Victoria and Albert Museum; V&A East Storehouse (annex)

Other information
- Public transit access: South Kensington; Kensington Museums 360; Victoria & Albert Museum 14, 74, C1
- Website: vam.ac.uk/info/national-art-library

The National Art Library (NAL) is a major reference library, situated in the Victoria and Albert Museum (V&A), a museum of decorative arts in London. The NAL holds the UK's most comprehensive collection of both books as art and books about art, which includes many genres and time periods. The NAL is open to the public, and as a closed reference library, items must be requested through the staff and cannot be removed from the reading room. The collections cover a wide range of art and design topics, including books about artists and art techniques, and consists of many different collections materials, including archival materials, artist's books, and children's literature. The library also serves as the museum's curatorial department for book arts. As a reference library, the NAL also serves as a training library for students, curators and museum staff, and the public.

The current mission of the NAL includes making information about art history and practice widely available, and aims to serve both national and international communities.

== History ==
What is today the NAL was originally founded in 1837 as the library for the Government School of Design, where it primarily served as an educational tool for craftsmen to learn techniques and aesthetics. It later moved to the current V&A museum site in 1857. While the NAL remains part of the V&A, it was named the National Art Library in 1865 in part to establish its independence as an institution, which allows it to develop collections independently from the work of the museum. However, from 1908 to 1985 the NAL was most often called the V&A Museum Library. By 1852, the library was open to everyone, though patrons were charged a fee.

As the library for the design school, collections were focused on instruction and meant to serve as examples of good design. Early collections associated with the museum depended greatly on donations from artists and collectors. As the collections grew through the early 1900s, patronage consisted mostly of art historians, collectors, curators, and high-profile artists, though it remained focused on the needs of students and others learning about art. Starting in the 1970s and continuing today, students make up a large percentage of patrons visiting the NAL for educational and artistic purposes. Collection of particularly experimental and contemporary artist's books began in the 1980s with the work of Jan van der Wateren, who served as the Chief Librarian. In the early 2000s, the library was merged with the Prints, Paintings and Drawings department to form the Word and Image Department. The V&A undertook a major restructuring in 2021 and the NAL was brought together with the Museum's Research Institute (VARI).

The NAL is known for publishing the Universal Catalogue of Books on Art in the 1960s, which served as an international bibliography of art books. It was named after previous iterations of the same publication from the late 1800s that served the same purpose.

== Collections ==
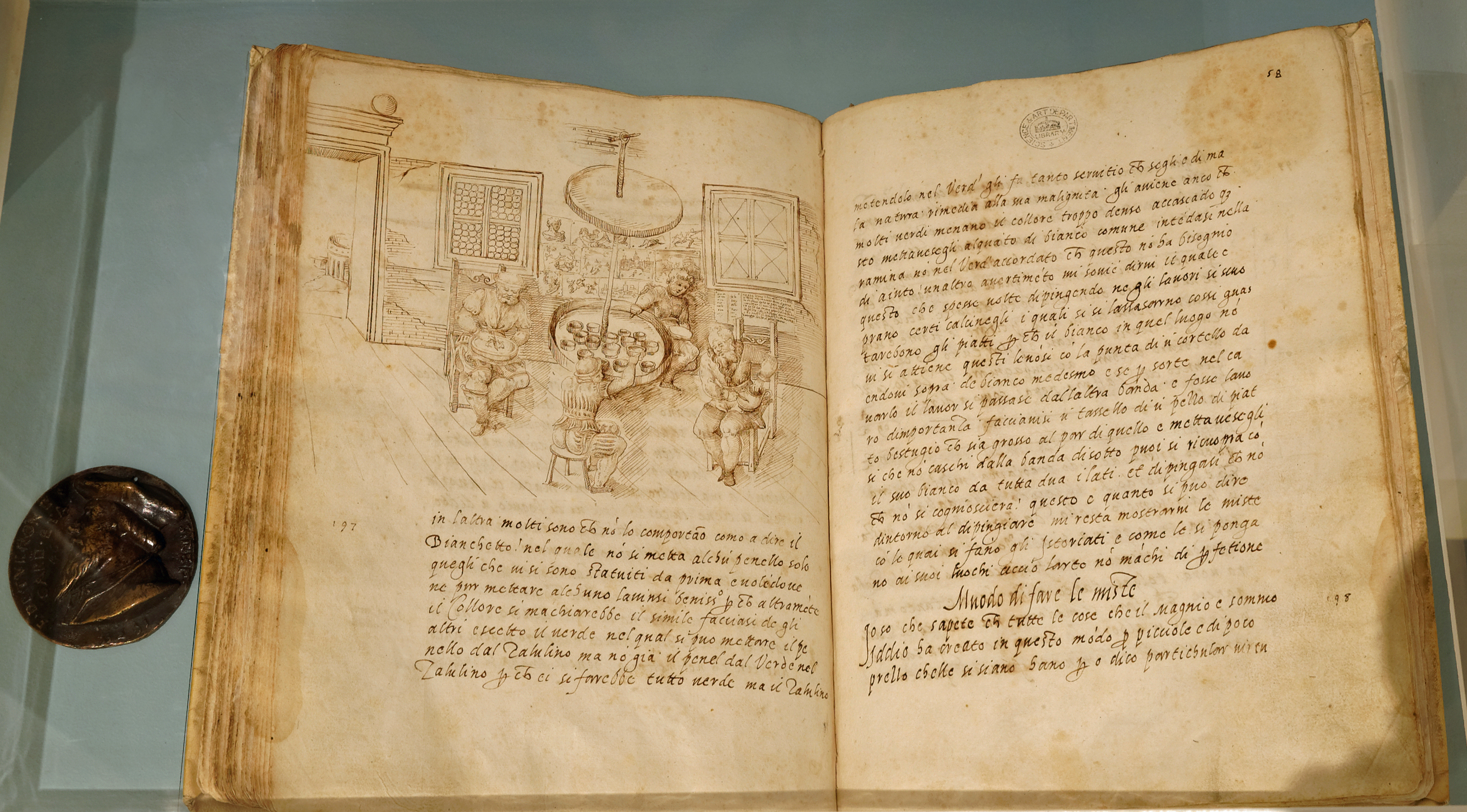
The library's unique manuscript of Li tre libri dell'arte del vasajo by Cipriano Piccolpasso (c. 1547), "widely accepted as the first comprehensive account of the manufacture of any kind of pottery ever produced in Europe".

The General Collection consists of materials whose subjects align with the work of the Museum, including books about various arts (such as painting, woodworking, and ceramics) with a special focus on art and design of the Far East, India, and Southeast Asia. The other main focus of the General Collection is the history of the design and artistry of books, including early printed books and children's books. Most of what can be found in the NAL collections is not available in public institutions.

As part of its work in collecting items and materials specific to the V&A's particular areas of research, the Library takes special care to catalog its collection. For example, the NAL cataloging methods include noting the number of illustrations in a given work, as well as detailing the physical elements of the books in its collections, due to the NAL's focus on the book as object and their value as resources for art history and the history of craft and design.

=== Special Collections ===
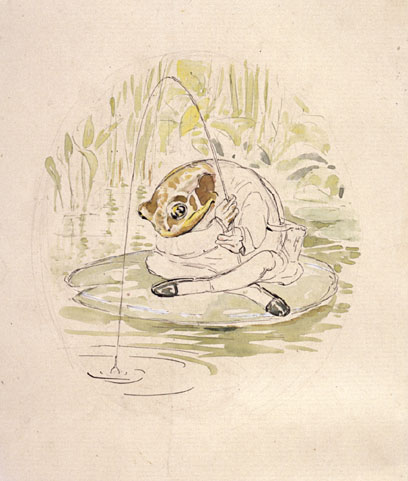
A preparatory drawing by Beatrix Potter for The Tale of Mr. Jeremy Fisher, 1906. This drawing is part of the V&A's Beatrix Potter collection, which includes manuscripts.

Special Collections at the NAL are generally more focused on books as objects of study, though they also contain archival materials, artists' letters, artists' manifestos, and manuscripts. Included in Special Collections are a number of Closed Collections, which are collections taken in from an independent collector. The Closed Collections include three collections of Beatrix Potter works.

=== Artists' books ===
Because the NAL has a focus on the book as art and object, it has a large collection of artist's books housed primarily in Special Collections. The collection contains items documenting the history of artist's books, including the early livres d'artistes as well as contemporary and experimental book objects. The NAL artists' book collection is one of its greatest strengths, and includes the first artists' book Ambroise Vollard published. The collection also contains books created by artists such as Sol Lewitt, Ed Ruscha, Édouard Manet, and David Hockney. This section of the collections experienced a boom in the 1980s and 1990s, when many contemporary works were collected by artists of various levels of popularity by former Chief Librarian Jan van der Wateren.

Although the collection of artist's books has slowed to allow funds to be used more broadly among the collections, there is still considerable collecting done of individual book objects. Artists represented in the collection also have information files in the library, which include ephemera and information about the artists and their works, even when individual works have not been collected, and some artists' information files have been created even when the library has not been able to collect any works by a particular artist.

=== Additional collection highlights ===
Among the NAL's other unique holdings are the Dyce & Forster collection, auction sale catalogues, calligraphy, chapbooks, children's books, comics, documentary manuscripts, early printed books, exhibition catalogues, fine bindings, illuminated manuscripts, and trade literature.

== Visitor access ==
=== Patron services ===
The reading room at the National Art Library in the V&A Museum, London, UK.

The NAL is a reference library, which means that its materials are available for viewing and use only within the library itself—materials are not available for checkout. Some reference books are out on open shelves, but otherwise, materials must be requested via staff at the reference desk.

The library's catalogue is also available on the web, and materials can be requested in advance of a visit.

=== Getting a library card ===
A National Art Library card is needed to place requests for library materials and access study rooms at the V&A. To get a library card, users must create an NAL account, which can be done online or in person at the Library. Upon creation of an NAL account, registration can be completed in-person at the library with a physical form of photographic ID.

=== Accessibility ===
The National Art Library offers the below services for patrons with disabilities:

- Materials delivery options
- Text magnification technology
- Advance book ordering
- Hearing induction loops for the hearing impaired
- Copying services

More information on accessibility to the V&A, NAL, and study rooms can be found on the V&A website, including a digital map of each floor of the museum.

== Sources ==
- Bettley, James, ed. The art of the book: from medieval manuscript to graphic novel. London: V&A Publications, 2001.
- National Art Library · V&A
