= Reading Foundation for Art =

- Housed at: Reading Museum
- Curators: Elaine Blake
- Funded by: Donation
- Website: rffa.org.uk

Reading Foundation for Art is an English charity registered in 1974. Its main purpose is to build an art collection for the people of Reading, Berkshire.

== History ==
The foundation was formed in 1974 following a donation by an anonymous benefactor. The first trustees registered it as a charity with the stated aim of purchasing works of art or other objects of archaeological, historical or scientific interest for the benefit of the public. These works are held in the permanent collection of Reading Borough Council in Reading Museum. The foundation also acquires works by donation and provides part funding for purchases made directly by the museum.

== Contents of the collection ==
The Foundation now owns over one hundred and twenty works of art including

- Paintings by Mary Fedden, Paul Nash and Julian Trevelyan
- Sculptures by Maggi Hambling and John Tweed
- Prints by Wilhelmina Barns-Graham, Sir Peter Blake, Sir Terry Frost and John Piper
- Ceramics and photographic collections
