= Cipriano Piccolpasso =

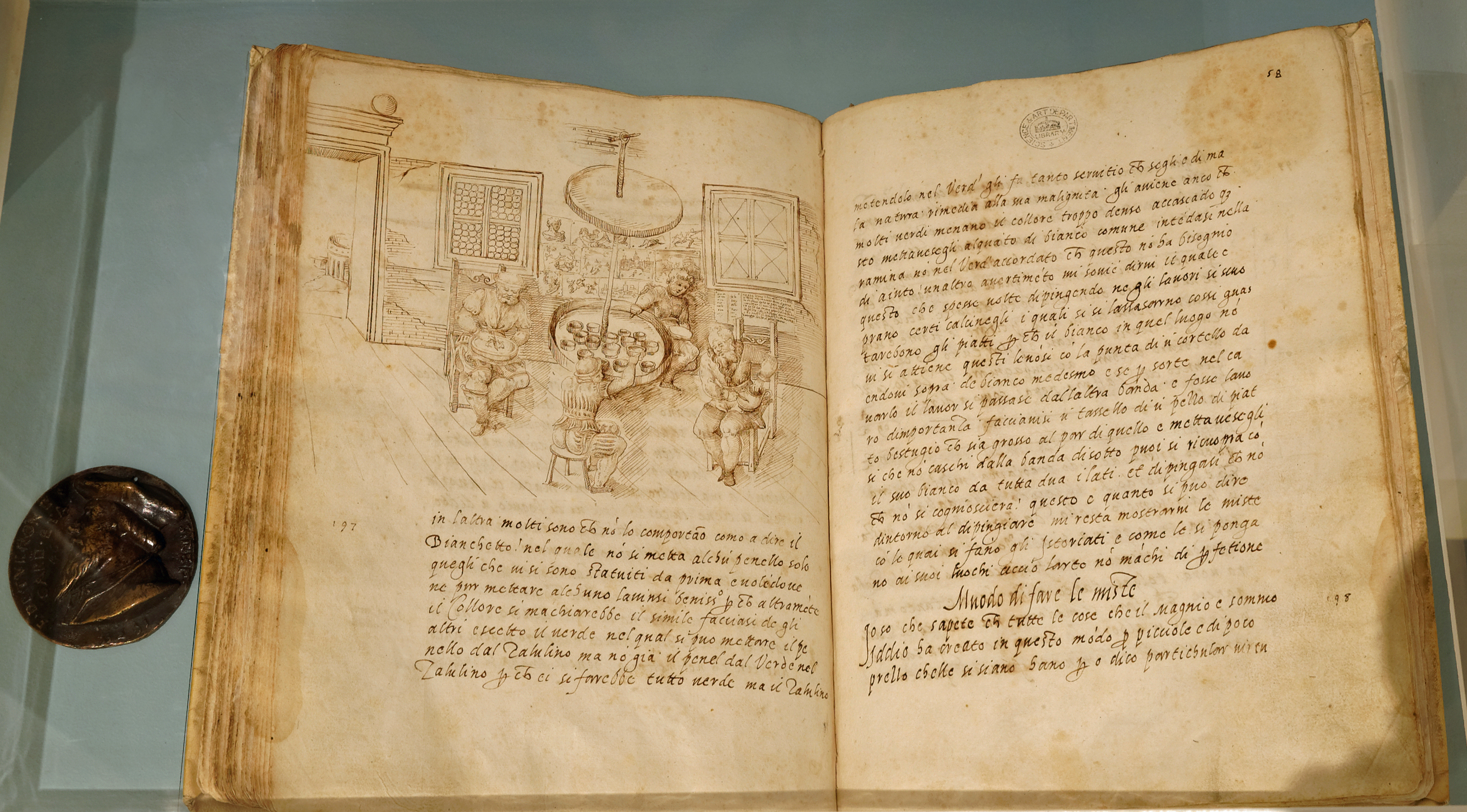
The Victoria and Albert Museum's manuscript of Li tre libri dell'arte del vasajo

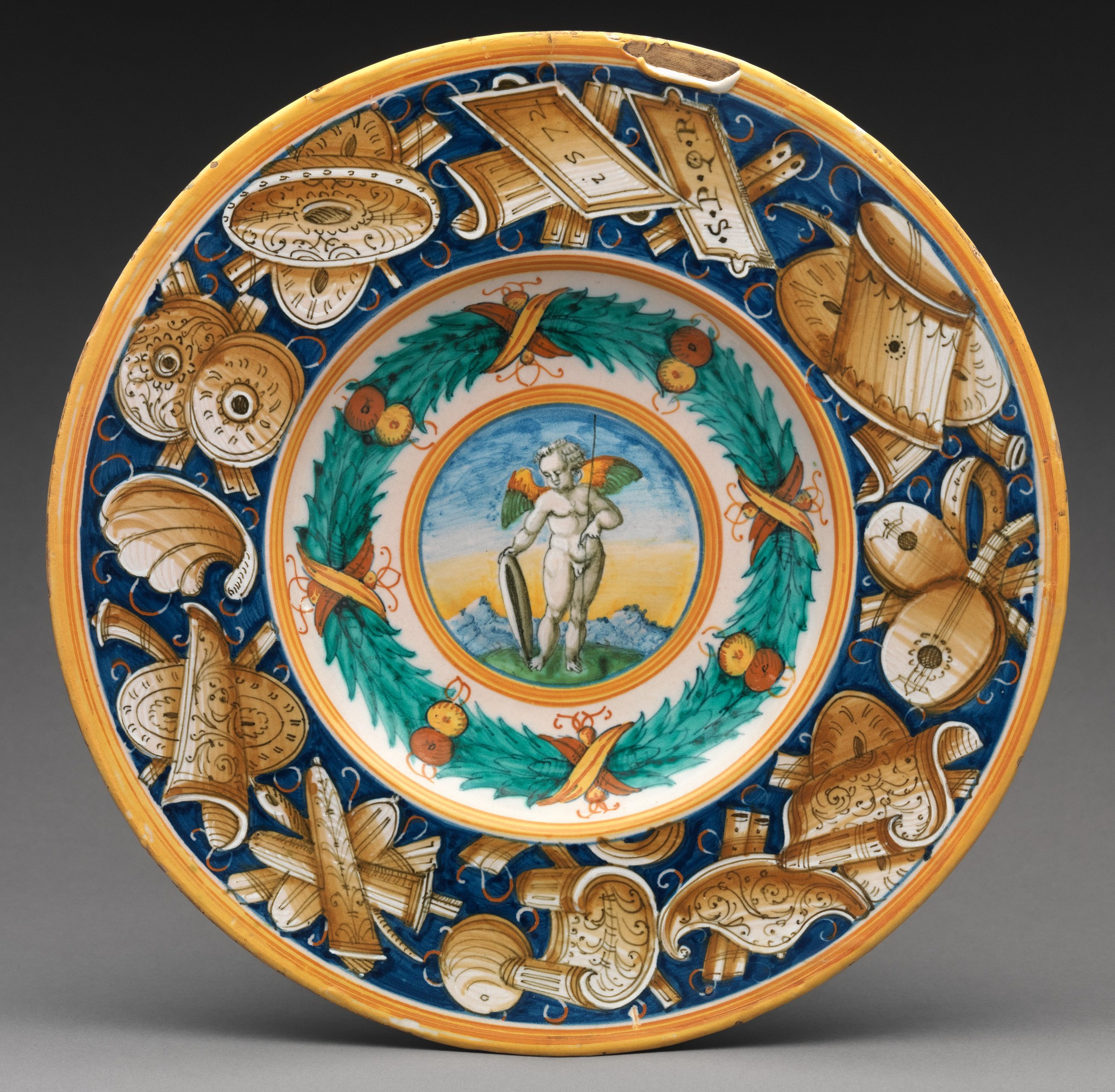
Maiolica dish using a design by Cipriano Piccolpasso, c. 1572

Cipriano di Michele Piccolpasso (1524 – 21 November 1579) was a member of an Italian patrician family of Bologna that had been settled since the mid-fifteenth century in Castel Durante, which was an important center for the manufacture of maiolica. Today he is remembered for writing Li tre libri dell'arte del vasajo ("The three books of the potter's art"), which are a storehouse of information on the techniques of maiolica from the choice of clays and their refinement, the shaping of the body, the composition of the glazes, to the preparation of the colors. The work "is now widely accepted as the first comprehensive account of the manufacture of any kind of pottery ever produced in Europe".

His brother operated a maiolica workshop, but it is not clear how much hands-on potting experience Cipriano himself had. He mentions that he had never used lustreware pigments, which might imply that he had used other types. His account of workshop techniques is in places unclear and hard to follow, either because he did not understand the process himself, or had difficulty forming a written description. The date of the book is uncertain, but most writers follow Bernard Rackham who suggested it (or at least the manuscript in the Victoria and Albert Museum) was written between around 1556 and 1559.

== Life ==
He had the humanist education of his station in life and was trained as a surveyor and civil and military engineer and draughtsman, which took him to Rimini, Ancona, Fano and Spoleto. Piccolpasso was also a poet, received a member of the literary Accademia degli Eccentrici in Perugia, where in 1573 he helped found the Accademia del Disegno, one of the earliest academies for Italian artists.

The tre libri treatise was written at the request of the Cardinal François de Tournon, "who spent a whole year there during the time when the French descended into Italy." and who may have had the improvement of French faience manufactures in mind.

He also wrote an illustrated topography of Umbria, Le piante ed I ritratti delle Città e Terre dell'Umbria sottoposte al governo di Perugia, which was commissioned by Pope Pius IV, by whom he was knighted, henceforth cavaliere. He was buried in the church of San Francesco, Castel Durante.

== Victoria and Albert Museum manuscript ==
What appears to be a fair copy manuscript, perhaps intended to be sent to printers, is enriched with his drawings of workshop processes and typical decorative motifs; it has 77 folios. This was bought for the library of the Victoria and Albert Museum and has been issued in photo facsimile with an introduction by Ronald Lightbown of the Victoria and Albert Museum and the potter Alan Caiger-Smith, an expert on the technical side of majolica ware. In fact the work was not published until 1857, but then had three different editions by 1879. Having become interested by the first publication, the museum bought the manuscript from Giuseppe Raffaelli (1785 – 1878) in 1861. Technically the manuscript was later passed to the National Art Library within the museum.
