= Aldermaston Pottery =

Pottery in Berkshire, England

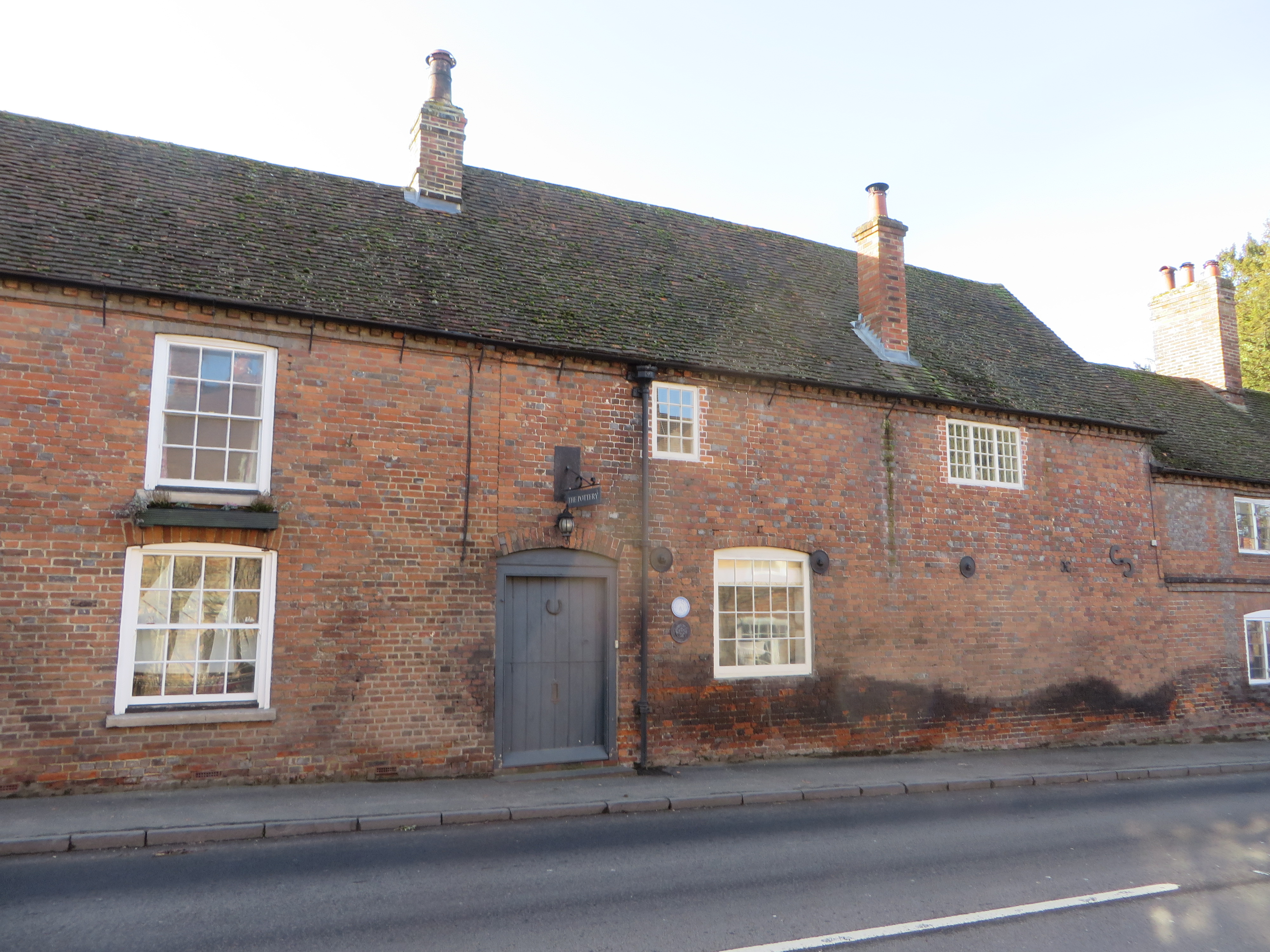
- Aldermaston Pottery building
- Type: Private
- Industry: Ceramics
- Genre: Studio pottery
- Founded: 1955
- Founder: Alan Caiger-Smith
- Defunct: 2006
- Fate: Dissolved
- Headquarters: Aldermaston, Berkshire, UK
- Key people: See #Potters
- Products: Tin-glazed earthenware

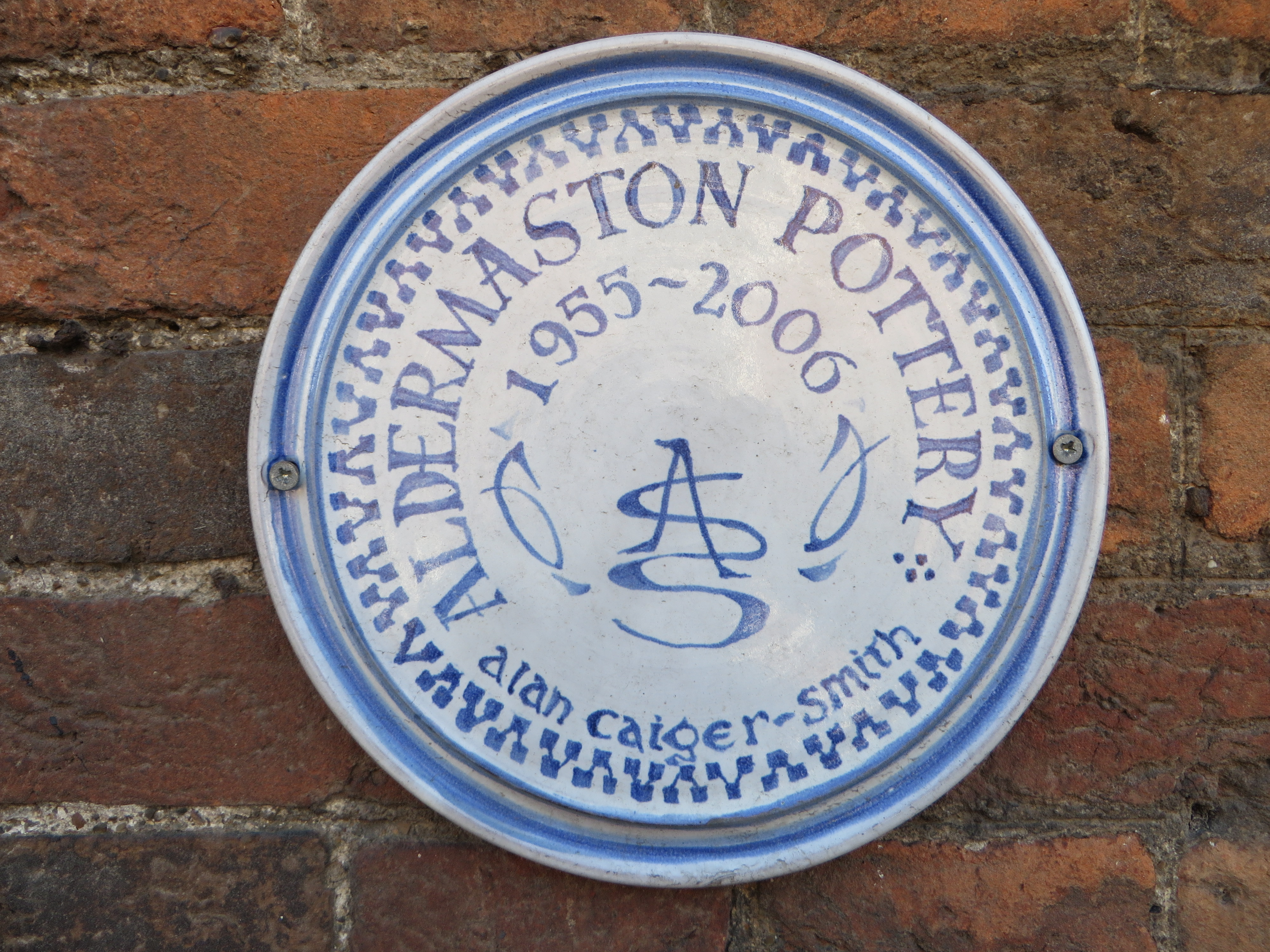
Aldermaston Pottery plaque.

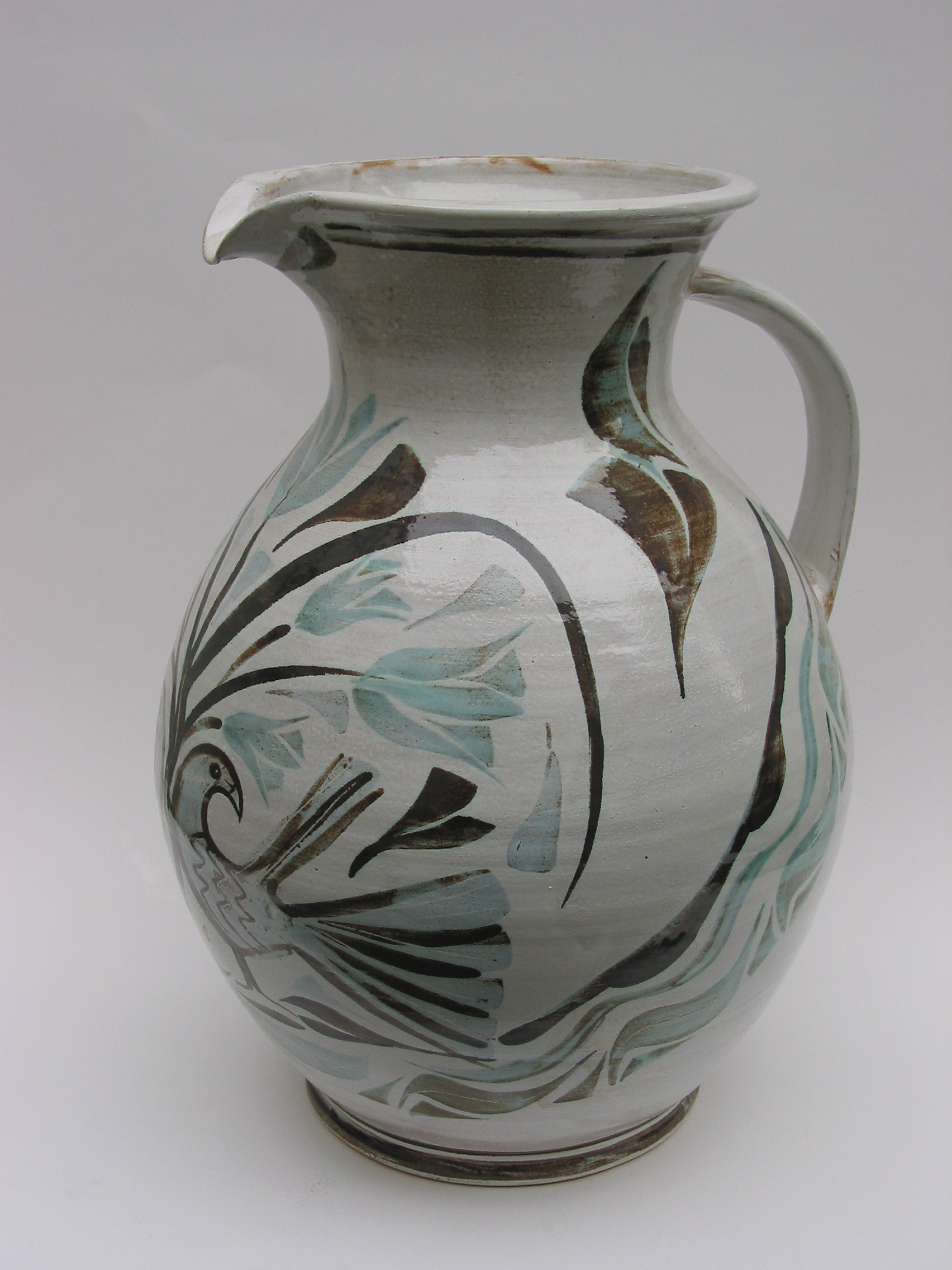
A vase by Andrew Hazelden.

Aldermaston Pottery was a pottery located in the Berkshire village of Aldermaston, England. It was founded in 1955 by Alan Caiger-Smith and was known for its tin-glaze pottery and particularly its lustre ware. His first assistant, Geoffrey Eastop, joined him in 1956, a year after the pottery started. They were joined in 1961 by David Tipler and Edgar Campden, who remained there until 1975 and 1993 respectively. Over a period of forty years, around sixty assistants worked at the pottery.

In 1965, the pottery was the subject of a television documentary produced by Michael Darlow.

The pottery scaled back its production in June 1993 when Caiger-Smith partially retired and stopped hiring assistants. It continued to be operated commercially until it was sold in 2006, and the building has now been converted into a private dwelling.

Reading Museum has an extensive collection of Aldermaston pottery displayed in its Atrium gallery. The pottery can also be seen on display at the Victoria & Albert Museum in London, the Allen Gallery in Alton, and the Ashmolean Museum in Oxford.

== Potters ==
- Alan Caiger-Smith
- Geoffrey Eastop
- David Tipler
- Julian Bellmont
- Edgar Campden
- Harriet Coleridge
- Mohamed Hamid
- Andrew Hazelden
- Myra McDonnell
- Laurence McGowan
- Simon Rich
