= Alan Caiger-Smith =

British potter (1930–2020)

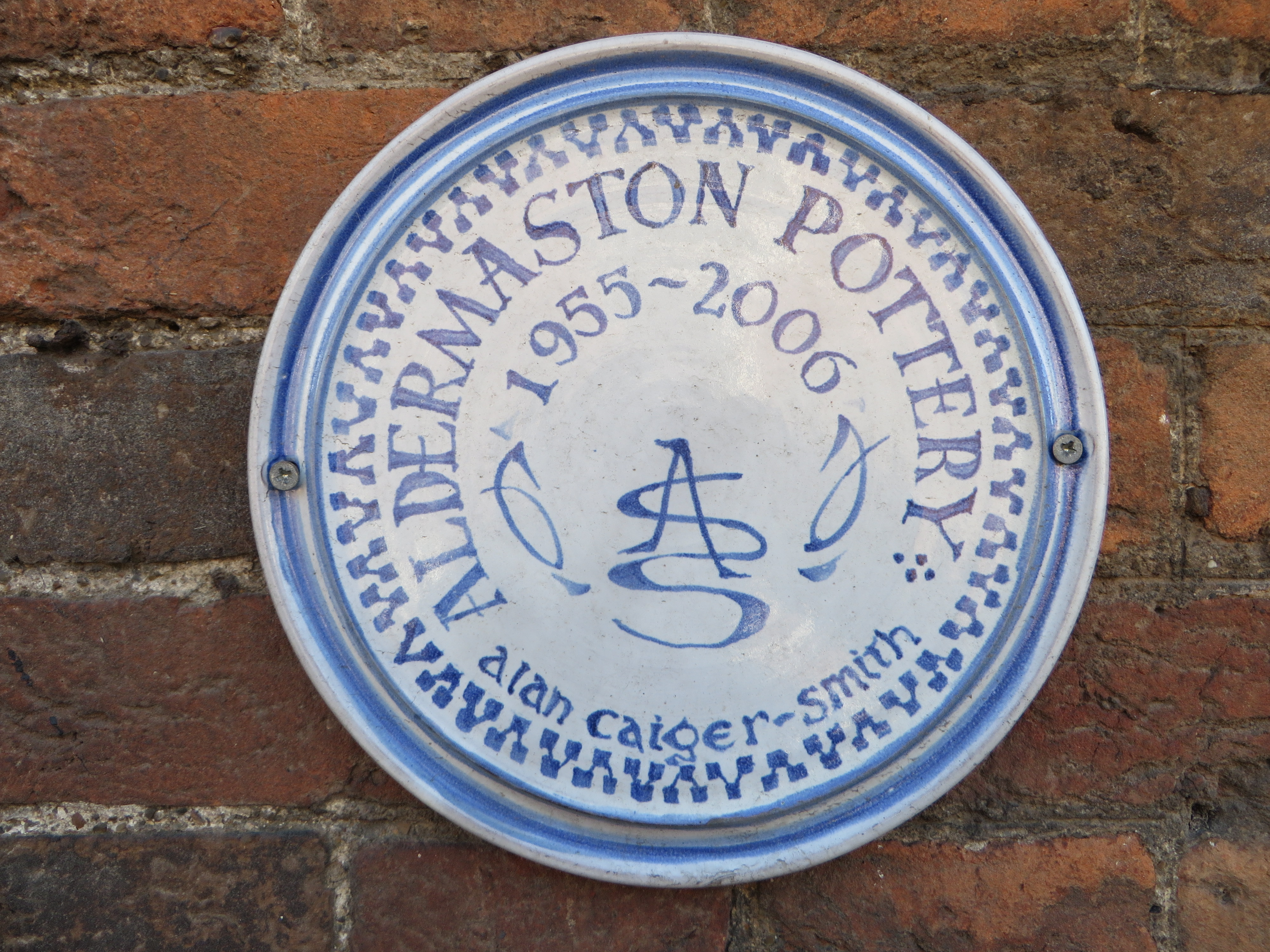
Plaque commemorating the Aldermaston Pottery, founded by Alan Caiger-Smith in 1955.

Alan Caiger-Smith MBE (8 February 1930 – 21 February 2020) was a British ceramicist, studio potter and writer on pottery.

== Life and work ==
Caiger-Smith was born in Buenos Aires, Argentina. He studied at the Camberwell School of Arts and Crafts and read history at King's College, Cambridge (1949-1952). He trained in pottery at the Central School of Art & Design in 1954 under Dora Billington.

According to Grove Art, Alan Caiger-Smith established the Aldermaston Pottery in 1955, "a cooperative workshop of about seven potters making functional domestic ware and tiles, as well as individual commissions and one-off pots. By trial and error he revived and perfected two virtually lost techniques: the use of tin glaze and painted pigments on red earthenware clay, and the firing of lustres on to tin glazes." However, "virtually lost" is questionable: in his Lustre Pottery, Caiger-Smith himself covers relatively recent revivals of lustreware by William De Morgan, Vilmos Zsolnay, Clément Massier and Pilkington's Royal Lancastrian Pottery. In particular his researches "reconstructed the medieval Islamic lustreware technique".

He was joined at Aldermaston Pottery by a number of other potters, including Geoffrey Eastop (1921–2014).

Alan Caiger-Smith's book on Tin-Glaze Pottery (1973) covers its history and much of its technique. He co-translated and annotated with R.W. Lightbown a detailed contemporary description of the materials and methods of Renaissance maiolica, Cipriano Piccolpasso's I Tre Libre Dell'Arte Del Vasaio (The Three Books of the Potter’s Art) (1980). His history of lustre ware, Lustre Pottery, was published in 1985.

Caiger-Smith was Chairman of the British Crafts Centre (1973–1978) and was awarded the MBE in 1988. He ceased employing assistants in 1993 to concentrate on personal work and in 2006 announced his decision to sell the Aldermaston Pottery.

== Bibliography ==
- Caiger-Smith, Alan, Tin-Glaze Pottery in Europe and the Islamic World: The Tradition of 1000 Years in Maiolica, Faience and Delftware (Faber and Faber, 1973). ISBN 0-571-09349-3.
- Caiger-Smith, Alan, Lustre Pottery: Technique, Tradition and Innovation in Islam and the Western World(Faber and Faber, 1985). ISBN 0-571-13507-2.
- Caiger-Smith, Alan, Pottery, People and Time: A Workshop in Action (Shepton Beauchamp: Richard Dennis, 1995). ISBN 0-903685-39-6.
- Piccolpasso, Cipriano, The Three Books of the Potter's Art (I Tre Libri del Arte Vasaiao) (trans. A. Caiger-Smith and R. Lightbown) (Scolar Press, 1980). ISBN 0-85967-452-5.
- Caiger-Smith, Alan, Said el Sadr 1909-1986. Potter, Painter, Sculptor, Teacher. (ACS Shalford Publications, 2010). ISBN 0956416608
- Caiger-Smith, Alan, Times and Seasons (I Tempi e le Stagioni) (Published 2012 in English and Italian). ISBN 9788897738244
- Caiger-Smith, Alan, English Medieval Mural Paintings (Oxford University Press, 1963).
- Wettlaufer, George and Nancy Wettlaufer. “England’s Alan Caiger-Smith.” 'Ceramics Monthly' 28, no. 1 (January 1980).
- White Jane, Alan Caiger-Smith and the Legacy of Aldermaston Pottery, Ashmolean Museum, Oxford, 2018 EAN 9781910807255

== See also ==
- Tin-glazed pottery
- Primavera Gallery in Cambridge
- Reading Museum has a large collection of Caiger-Smith's pottery
