= Reading Museum =

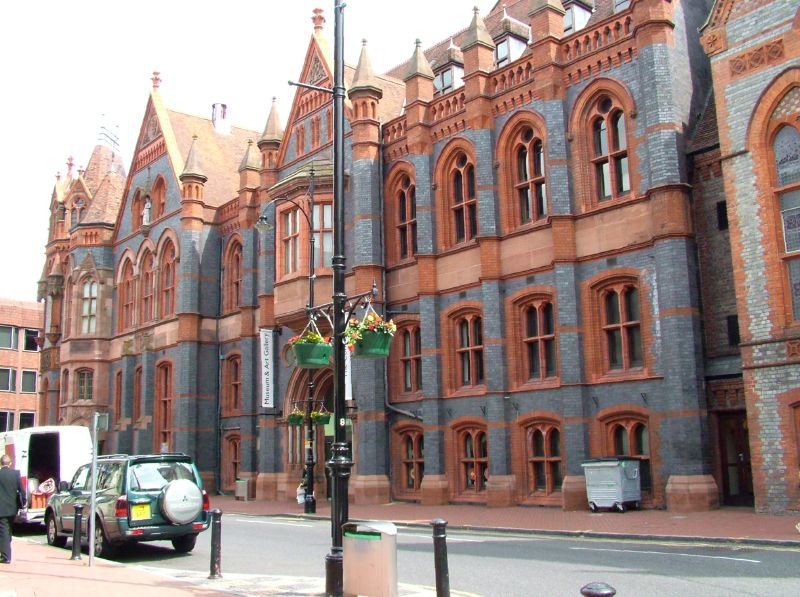
- The entrance to the Reading Museum within Reading Town Hall

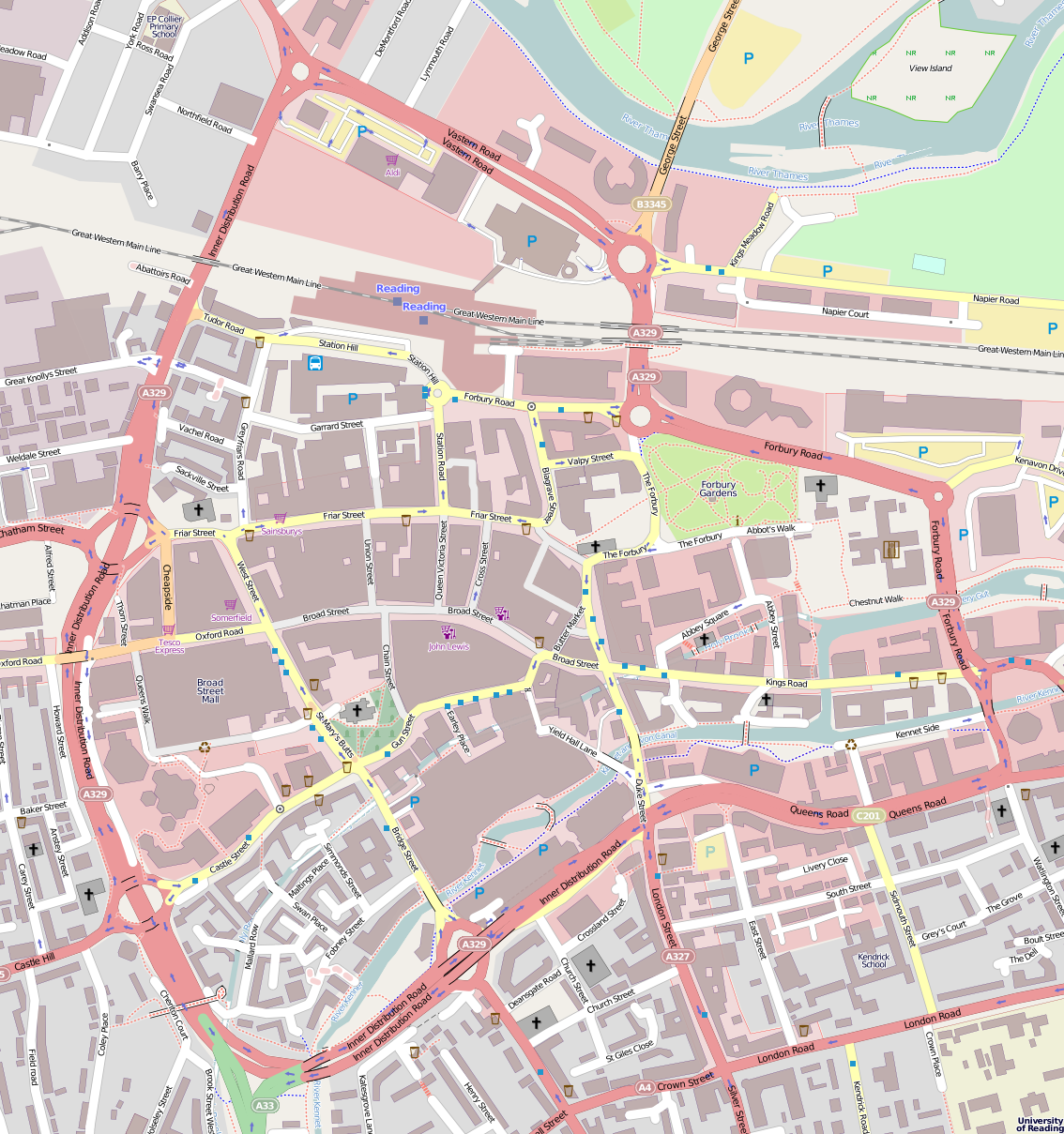
- Location within Reading Town Centre
- Established: 1883
- Location: Reading, Berkshire, UK
- Coordinates: 51.4572°N 0.9702°W
- Type: Local museum
- Public transit access: Reading railway station
- Website: readingmuseum.org.uk

Reading Museum (run by the Reading Museum Service) is a museum of the history of the town of Reading, in the English county of Berkshire, and the surrounding area. It is accommodated within Reading Town Hall, and contains galleries describing the history of Reading and its related industries, a gallery of artefacts discovered during the excavations of Calleva Atrebatum (Silchester Roman Town), a copy of the Bayeux Tapestry, finds relating to Reading Abbey and an art collection.

== History of the museum ==
Reading Town Hall was built in several phases between 1786 and 1897, although the principal facade was designed by Alfred Waterhouse in 1875. In 1879, the foundation stone was laid for a new wing containing a library and museum, and the museum duly opened in 1883. The museum displayed a large eclectic collection from the late Horatio Bland. Three art galleries were added in further extension in 1897.

In 1975, the civic offices moved out of the Town Hall to Reading Civic Centre. They were followed in 1985 by the Reading Central Library which left only the museum and the concert hall in use. After some debate, plans to demolish the Town Hall and replace it with a new cultural centre were abandoned, and in 1986 refurbishment of the building started. The museum was closed for renewal in 1989, reopening in stages from 1993 (the Reading: People & Place gallery) to 2000.

== Principal galleries ==
=== Story of Reading Gallery ===
This documents Reading's history, from its origins as a Saxon settlement in the 6th century up to today, with a mixture of oral history presentations, interactive displays and a mix of real objects from the period. There is an emphasis on Reading Abbey.

=== The Silchester Gallery ===
The gallery features many archaeological finds from the excavations conducted at the nearby Calleva Atrebatum (Silchester Roman Town) together with explanatory models and other information on life in the Roman town. This includes the bronze Silchester eagle that was immortalised by Rosemary Sutcliff in her children's book The Eagle of the Ninth, first published in 1954.

The Roman town of Calleva Atrebatum was excavated in the 1860s, unearthing a diversity of finds including jewellery, fine glass and pottery, sculpture, mosaics, iron tools and coins. Many items found during the excavation are displayed in the gallery. Items of particular note include the Silchester eagle, the Silchester Horse and the damaged head of Seraphis. A model of the Roman town is also on display.

=== Atrium ===
This space provides seating around a Roman pavement mosaic from the Silchester site, where a 4th-century Christian church is thought to have existed. On the wall are displays of two large mosaics from Silchester. The mosaics are juxtaposed with ceramics of Alan Caiger-Smith produced at his Aldermaston Pottery.

=== The Bayeux Gallery ===
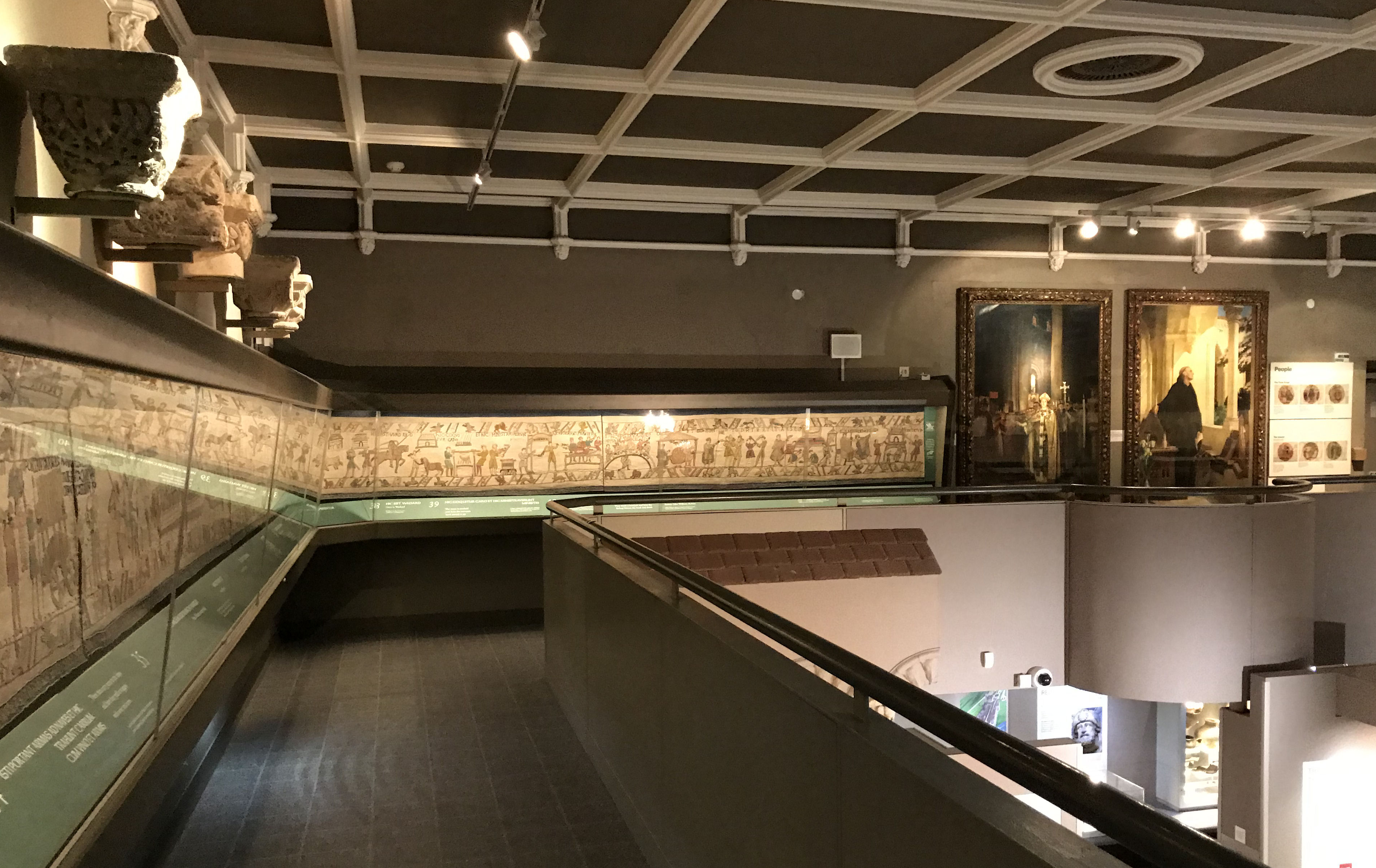
The Bayeux Tapestry Gallery

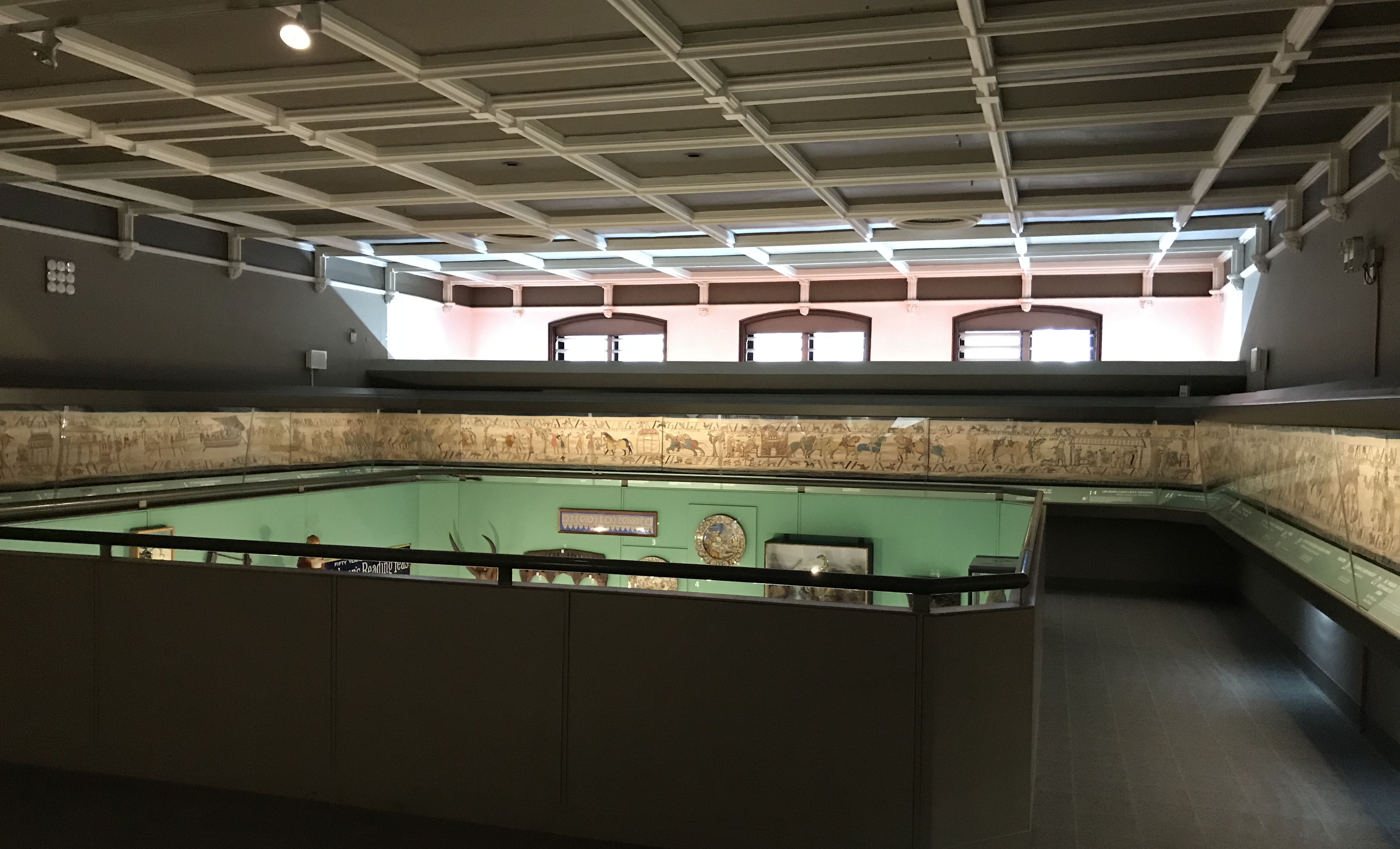
The Bayeux Tapestry Gallery

Reading Museum's Bayeux Tapestry Gallery exhibits an accurate replica of the Bayeux Tapestry, made by 35 women of the Leek Embroidery Society in 1885. The tapestry is the only known full size woven copy of the original tapestry in existence.

The tapestry is 70 metres long and depicts the events of the Norman Conquest of England by William, Duke of Normandy in 1066. This includes the preamble to conflict, followed by the preparations for war and decisive Norman victory in the Battle of Hastings. Information boards around the exhibit offer a translation of the original Medieval Latin, while providing the visitor with a historical description of the conquest. The final section of the Tapestry, which included William's coronation at Westminster Abbey, was lost before the copy was made. The events have a local significance to Reading, for King William's youngest son Henry I founded Reading Abbey in 1121 and was later buried there in 1136.

The exhibit is complemented by information on the history of Saxon migration and Viking raids in the local area.

=== The Green Space ===
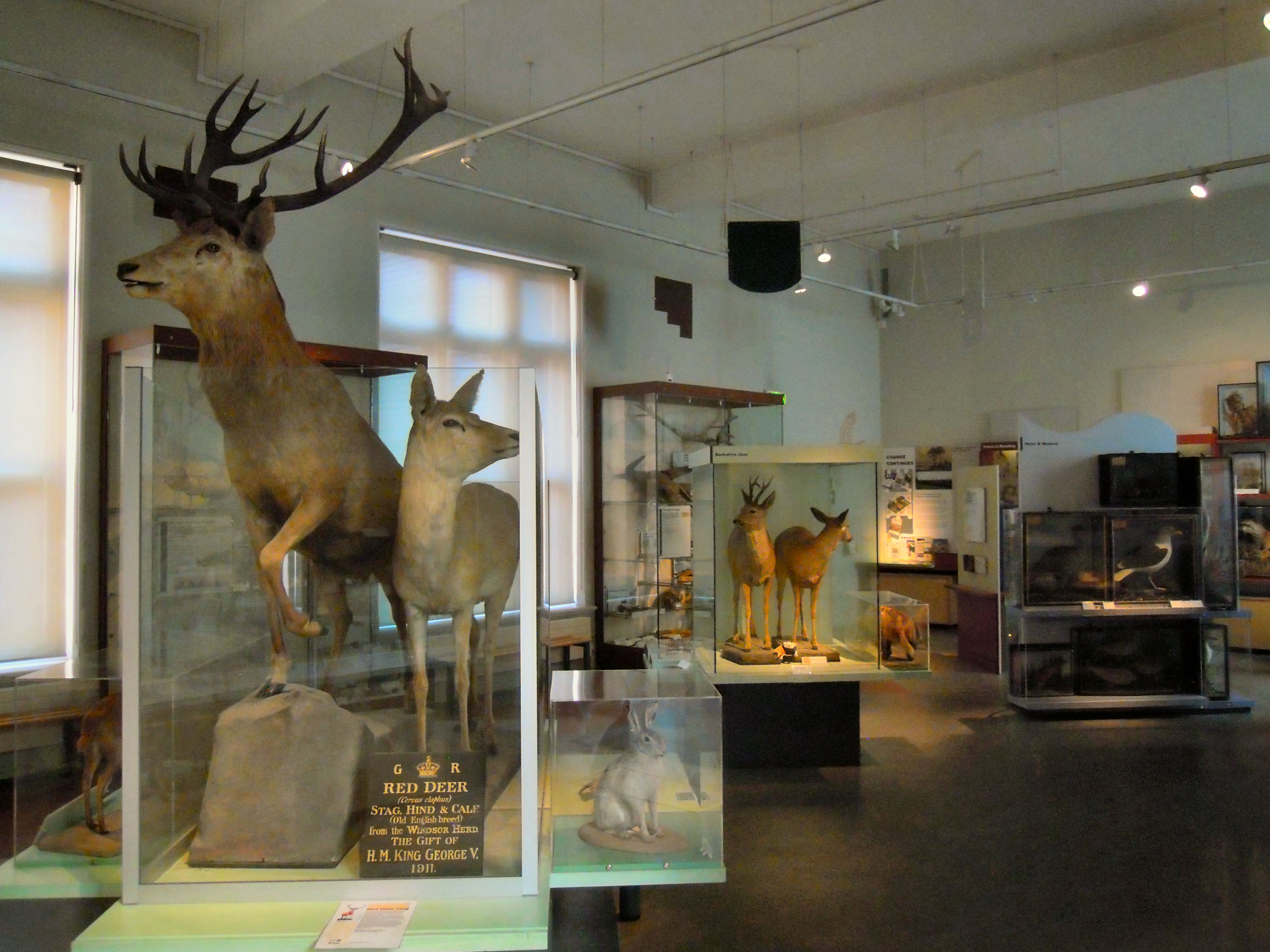
The Green Space Gallery

The Gallery explains the geology and natural history of the Reading area through a large display of specimens. Exploring the history of the Reading area from 400 million years ago to the present day, it explains what was in the area before people existed and how Reading's landscape and environment have developed and been influenced by human activity since the Stone Age.

The Gallery also shows the animals and plants living in the Reading area today. Highlights in the display include a complete Iron Age dog skeleton discovered and excavated at Blewburton hillfort; and a royal red deer stag which was donated to the museum by George V from the royal herd at Windsor Great Park.

=== Huntley & Palmers Gallery ===
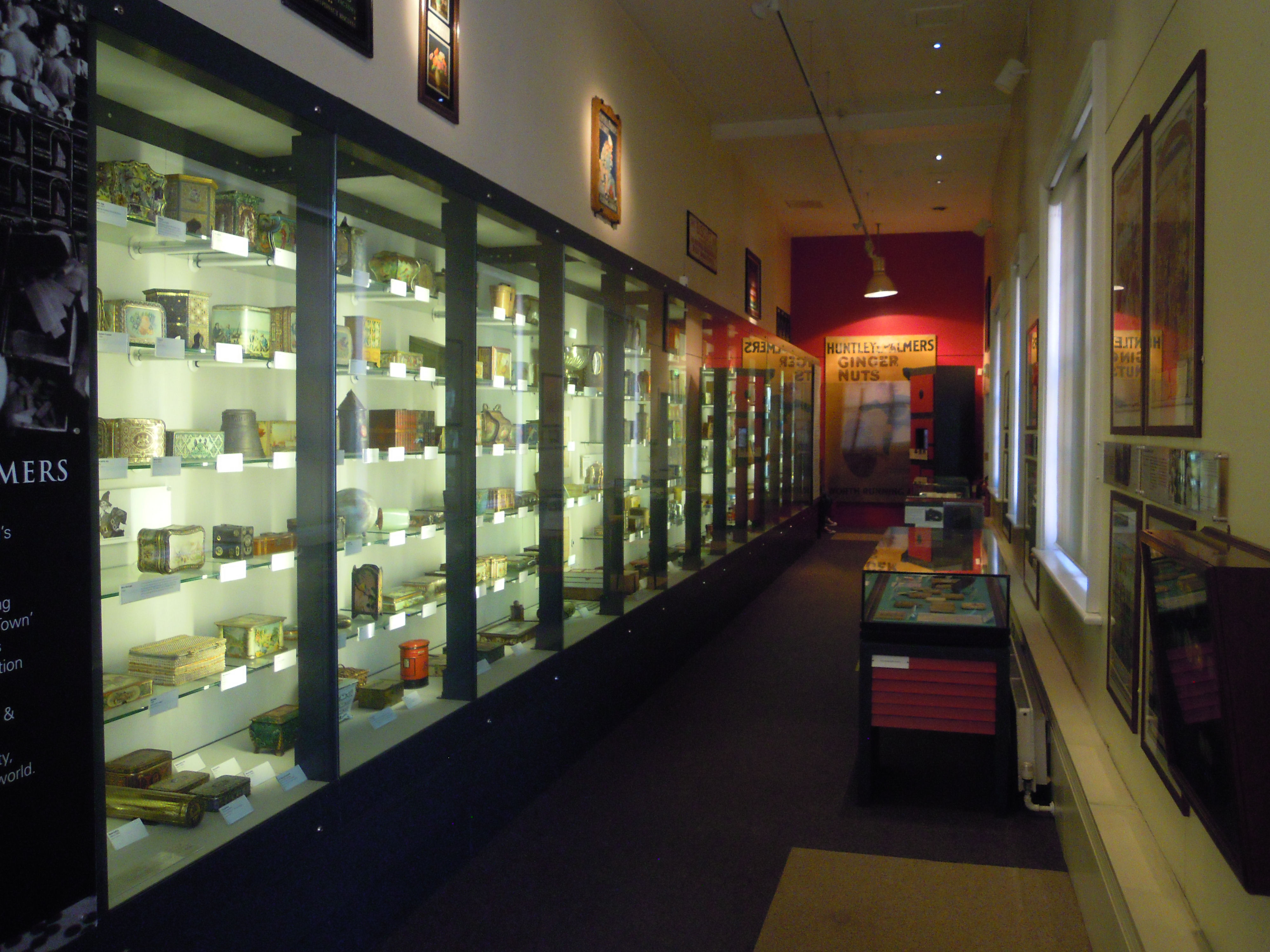
The Huntley & Palmers Gallery

This gallery reveals the history of the biscuit-making industry that was once one of the mainstays of the Reading economy, with special emphasis on the Huntley and Palmers company, Reading's world famous biscuit makers. The display charts how Huntley & Palmers pioneered the mass production of biscuits and explains why Reading became known as the 'Biscuit Town'.

The display shows what factory life was like for Huntley & Palmers' thousands of employees explained through oral recordings, photographs and historic film, including the earliest surviving film of a British factory in action. Highlights of the display include about 300 decorative biscuit tins as well as advertising material and other artefacts; an African thumb piano crafted from a Huntley & Palmers biscuit tin; a biscuit supplied to Captain Scott's final Antarctic expedition, and an example of the rude ‘Kate Greenaway’ biscuit tin that continues to embarrass the company today.

=== The Windows Gallery ===
This Gallery is named The Windows Gallery as it is a 'window' on the museum's wide collection of sculpture and decorative art, ranging from Romanesque stones from the 12th-century from Reading Abbey to modern pieces by Rodin and Epstein.

Originally, this section of the museum housed the Reading School of Art and as such was designed to be well-lit by natural daylight from the windows on either side. Highlights of the collection include: 12th century Romanesque capitals from Reading Abbey; sculpture by Rodin, Epstein and Gibbings, and Delftware plates and other ceramics.

=== The Sir John Madejski Art Gallery ===
This is a recreation of the museum's original Victorian era art gallery and houses changing exhibitions of artworks. It is named after John Madejski, the chairman of Reading F.C.

=== The Exhibition Gallery ===
This space is designed to house changing exhibitions, both from the museum's collection and external sources. As an example, in late 2004, the gallery contained an exhibition on the history of the Reading Festival.

== Access ==
The museum is free to visit. As of February 2020, it is open from 10:00 to 16:00 on Tuesday to Friday, 10.00 to 17.00 on Saturdays, and closed all day Monday and Sunday, with exceptions for holidays.

== Charitable ==
Reading Foundation for Art was set up in 1974 with the ambition of building an art collection to enrich the lives of the local residents and enhance the cultural fabric of Reading and the surrounding areas. It now has a collection of over 150 works on permanent loan to Reading Museum and is a registered charity.
