= 2015 New Year Honours =

British royal recognitions

The New Year Honours 2015 were appointments by some of the 16 Commonwealth realms to various orders and honours to recognise and reward good works by citizens of those countries. The New Year Honours are awarded as part of the New Year celebrations at the start of January.

The recipients of honours are displayed as they were styled before their new honour. They are arranged by the country (in order of precedence) whose ministers advised the Queen on the appointments, then by honour with grades, i.e. Knight/Dame Grand Cross, Knight/Dame Commander etc., and then by divisions, i.e. Civil, Diplomatic and Military as appropriate.

== United Kingdom ==
Below are the individuals appointed by Elizabeth II in her right as Queen of the United Kingdom with honours within her own gift and with the advice of the Government for other honours.

=== Member of the Order of the Companions of Honour (CH) ===
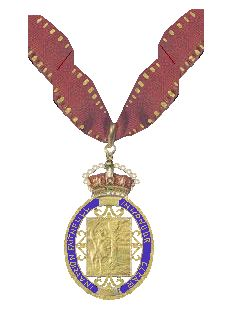
The riband and badge of a Member of the Order of the Companions of Honour

- The Right Honourable Jeremy John Durham, Baron Ashdown of Norton-sub-Hamdon, GCMG KBE PC. For public and political service.
- Sir (George) Adrian Hayhurst Cadbury DL. For services to Business and the community in the UK, particularly Birmingham.
- Dame Mary Elizabeth Peters DBE. For services to Sport and to the community in Northern Ireland.
- The Right Honourable David Ivor, Baron Young of Graffham DL. For public service.

=== Knight Bachelor ===
- Theodore Agnew, DL. For services to Education
- David Amess, MP, Member of Parliament for Southend West. For political and public service
- Matt Baggott, CBE, QPM, Formerly Chief constable, Police Service of Northern Ireland. For services to Policing in the United Kingdom
- Professor Richard Robert Barnett, Vice-Chancellor University of Ulster. For services to Higher Education and Business in Northern Ireland
- Professor Jonathan Bate, CBE, FBA, Literary Scholar and Provost, Worcester College, Oxford. For services to Literary Scholarship and Higher Education
- Hugh Nigel Edward Bayley, MP, Member of Parliament for York Central and President of the NATO Parliamentary Assembly. For services to Parliamentary engagement with the North Atlantic Treaty Organisation
- Dr. Simon Campbell, CBE, FRS, Drug Discoverer and Scientific Adviser. For services to Chemistry
- Dr. Sam Everington, OBE, Chair, NHS Tower Hamlets Clinical Commissioning Group. For services to Primary Care
- Professor Julian Ernest Michael Le Grand, FBA, Richard Titmuss Professor of Social Policy, London School of Economics. For services to Social Science and public service
- John Vincent Hurt, CBE, Actor. For services to Drama
- Peter Ashley Kendall. For services to the Agricultural Industry in England and Wales
- Andrew Valentine Morris, OBE, Chief Executive, Frimley Health NHS Foundation Trust. For services to the NHS
- Richard Leon Paniguian, CBE, Head, Defence and Security Organisation, UK Trade & Investment. For services to the UK Defence Industry
- Professor Martyn Poliakoff, CBE, FRS, Research Professor of Chemistry, University of Nottingham. For services to the Chemical Sciences
- Dickson Poon, CBE. For services to Business and to charity particularly Higher Education
- Dave Ramsden, CBE, Head, Government Economic Service. For services to Economic Policy Making
- Professor Nilesh Jayantilal Samani, DL, Professor of Cardiology, University of Leicester. For services to Medicine and Medical Research
- Professor Nigel Thrift, DL, FBA, Vice-Chancellor, University of Warwick. For services to Higher Education
- John Arthur Townsley, Executive Principal, The Gorse Academics Trust, Leeds. For services to Education
- David John Verey, CBE, Chair, The Art Fund. For services to Arts Philanthropy
- Professor Norman Stanley Williams, Past President, Royal College of Surgeons of England. For services to Surgery
- Tom Winsor, HM Chief Inspector of Constabulary. For public service

=== The Most Honourable Order of the Bath ===
==== Knight / Dame Commander of the Order of the Bath (KCB / DCB) ====
Military

- Lieutenant General Christopher Deverell MBE – Late of the Royal Tank Regiment
- Air Marshal Barry North OBE

Civil

- Paul Silk – Formerly Chair, Commission on Devolution in Wales. For services to the Parliaments of and Devolution in the UK

==== Companion of the Order of the Bath (CB) ====
Military

- Vice Admiral Peter Hudson CBE
- Major General Michael David Conway – Late Adjutant General's Corps (Army Legal Services Branch)
- Major General John Crackett TD – Late Royal Corps of Signals, Army Reserve
- Major General Dickie (Richard) Roderick Davis CBE – Late Corps of Royal Engineers
- Air Vice Marshal Stuart David Atha DSO

Civil

- Harold Mark Carter – Deputy Legal Adviser, Legal Advisers' Branch, Treasury Solicitors. For services to Government Legal Services and services to the community in Guildford, Surrey
- David Julian Cook – Second Parliamentary Counsel, Office of the Parliamentary Counsel. For services to the Preparation of Legislation
- Alison Cottrell – Director, HM Treasury. For services to Financial Services Consumers
- Jim (James) Harra – Director-General Business Tax, HM Revenue and Customs, London. For services to Tax Administration
- Dr. Andrew John McDonald – For services to Parliament and voluntary service to Disability Awareness
- Nicholas Christopher Shanahan – Director-General Operations, Department for Work and Pensions. For services to Welfare Reform
- Professor Christopher John MacRae Whitty – Chief Scientific Adviser, Department for International Development. For public and voluntary service to Tropical Medicine in the UK and Africa

=== The Most Distinguished Order of Saint Michael and Saint George ===
==== Knight / Dame Grand Cross of the Order of St Michael and St George (GCMG) ====
- The Baroness Ashton of Upholland PC – Formerly EU High Representative for Common Foreign and Security Policy and vice-president of the European Commission. For services to the European External Action Service.
- Sir John Sawers KCMG – Chief, Secret Intelligence Service. For services to British national security.

==== Knight / Dame Commander of the Order of St Michael and St George (KCMG / DCMG) ====
- Tim Barrow CMG LVO MBE – HM Ambassador, Russia. For services to British foreign policy and interests in Russia
- David John Bostock CMG – Member of the European Court of Auditors. For services to public administration and accountability
- Professor Anne Mills CBE FRS – Deputy director and Provost, London School of Hygiene and Tropical Medicine. For services to international health.

==== Companion of the Order of St Michael and St George (CMG) ====
- Graham Andrew – Technical Adviser to the Director-General of the International Atomic Energy Agency, Vienna, Austria. For services to international diplomacy
- Dr. Laurence Stanley Charles Bristow – Director, National Security, Foreign and Commonwealth Office. For services to British foreign policy interests and national security
- George Benedict Joseph Pascal Busby OBE – Counsellor, British High Commission, Islamabad, Pakistan. For services to international security
- James Jonathan Howard Morrison – Chief of Staff to the EU High Representative for Common Foreign and Security Police. For services to the European External Action Service
- Catherine Elizabeth Nettleton OBE – HM Ambassador, Venezuela. For services to British foreign policy and interests in Venezuela
- Dr. Robin Christian Howard Niblett – Director, Royal Institute of International Affairs. For services to promoting the UK as a global centre for foreign policy
- Philip John Parham – Formerly Ambassador and British Deputy Permanent Representative to the United Nations. For services to British multilateral foreign policy interests
- David Quarrey – Director, Middle East and North Africa, Foreign and Commonwealth Office. For services to British foreign policy in the Middle East and North Africa
- Richard David Spearman OBE – Counsellor, British Embassy, Washington, USA. For services to international security
- Raymond Peter James Upton – Country director, British Council, Pakistan. For services to UK-Pakistan cultural relations

=== The Royal Victorian Order ===
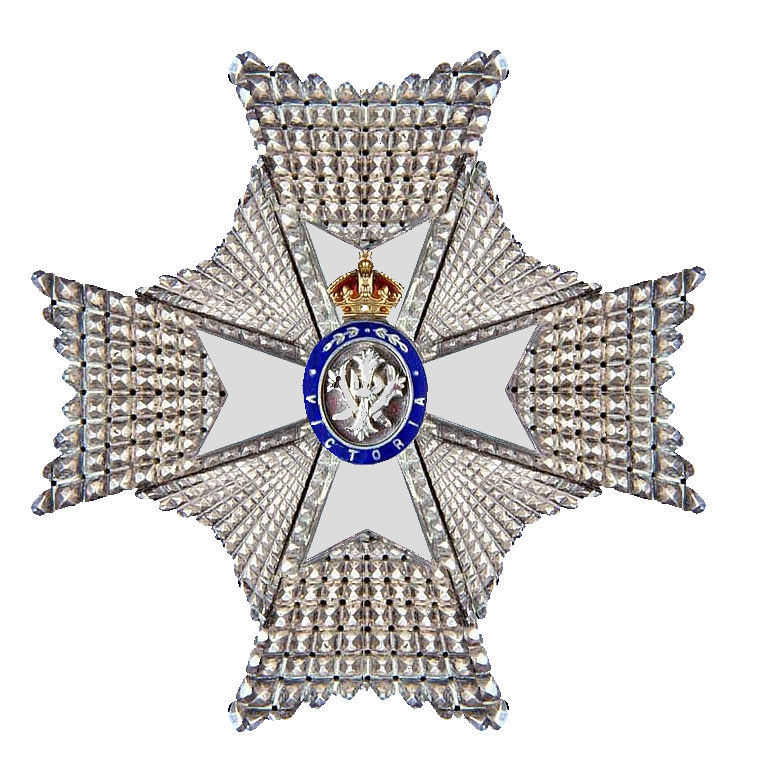
Insignia of a Knight / Dames Commander of the Royal Victorian Order

==== Knight / Dame Commander of the Royal Victorian Order (KCVO / DCVO) ====
- Shân Legge-Bourke LVO, Lord-Lieutenant of Powys.
- The Earl of Caledon, Lord-Lieutenant of County Armagh.
- Sir David Manning GCMG CVO, Adviser to the Duke and Duchess of Cambridge and Prince Harry.
- Lord Tollemache, formerly Lord-Lieutenant of Suffolk.

==== Commander of the Royal Victorian Order (CVO) ====
- The Hon. Mary Selina Bayliss, Lord-Lieutenant of Berkshire
- Sir David William Brewer CMG JP, Lord-Lieutenant of Greater London
- Michael Patrick Day, Chief Executive, Historic Royal Palaces
- Anthony James Longmore Worth, Lord-Lieutenant of Lincolnshire

==== Lieutenant of the Royal Victorian Order (LVO) ====
- Joy-Maria Camm – Assistant private secretary to The Duchess of Cornwall
- Dr. Martin David Clayton MVO – Head of Prints and Drawings, Royal Library, Windsor Castle
- Nicholas John Wingfield Digby – Veterinary Surgeon to the Royal Studs
- Stephanie Gail Greengross – Director Strategic Communications, Business in the Community
- Roger Francis Tollemache Halliday MVO – Formerly Land Steward, Western District, Duchy of Cornwall
- Jonathan David Hellewell – Formerly assistant private secretary to The Prince of Wales and The Duchess of Cornwall
- The Reverend Canon Denis Ratliffe Mulliner – Chaplain Chapel Royal, Hampton Court Palace
- William James Nye – Principal private secretary to The Prince of Wales and The Duchess of Cornwall
- Catherine Teresa O'Donnell MVO – Formerly Nursing Sister, Buckingham Palace
- Louise Mary Tait – Communications secretary for Scotland Royal Household

==== Member of the Royal Victorian Order (MVO) ====
- Catherine Mary Bland, Personal assistant to the Deputy Private Secretary to The Prince of Wales and The Duchess of Cornwall.
- Nicola Christine Brentnall, Director, The Queen's Trust.
- Jon Allison Brewer, Paintings Conservator, Royal Collection Trust.
- Michael John Brown, Volunteer Awards Assessor, The Prince's Trust.
- Deborah Clare Clarke, Senior Curator, Palace of Holyroodhouse.
- Inspector Clive Graham Cox, Metropolitan Police. For services to Royalty Protection.
- Paul Coxon, Operations Surveyor, Royal Household.
- Eric Kenneth James Crawford, Building and Civil Engineering Works Supervisor, Royal Household.
- Laura Jane Gibson, Head of Digital Engagement for Royal Communications Royal Household.
- Kenrick Steven Hanson, Systems Development Officer, Royal Household.
- Daniel James Harvey, RVM, Senior Engineer, Sandringham Estate.
- Susan Elizabeth Jubb, Senior Receptionist, Clarence House.
- Laura Claire France Kellard, Senior IT Training and Development Officer, Royal Household.
- Inspector Terence Christopher Leach, Metropolitan Police. For services to Royalty Protection.
- Mark Geoffrey Lisk, RVM, Household of the Duke of York.
- Susan Mary Pendry, Formerly Administrator, St. George's House, Windsor Castle.
- Christopher Thomas Perkins, Formerly Landing Site Officer, The Queen's Helicopter Flight.
- Dr. Edward William Perkins, Formerly Communications secretary to the Duke and Duchess of Cambridge and Prince Henry of Wales.
- Michael Dudley de Burgh Collins Persse. For services to the Prince of Wales.
- Douglas Hastings Precey, Formerly head of Secretariat, Private Secretary's Office Royal Household.
- Mary Squire, Lieutenancy Clerk, Mid-Glamorgan.
- Andrew Michael Tibble, Operations and Logistics Manager, Household of the Prince of Wales and the Duchess of Cornwall.
- Bernadette Tomas – Senior Management Accountant, Royal Household.
- Peter Barry Whorton, RVM, Deputy Yeoman of the Plate Pantry, Windsor Castle.
- Annwen Lloyd Williams, Senior Administrator, Aberdyfi Centre, Outward Bound Trust.

=== Royal Victorian Medal (RVM) ===
- Andrew John Brown – Forestry Foreman Sandringham Estate
- Lance Sergeant Stephen Centro Cassidy – formerly Household of the Duke of Kent
- Colin Alfred Childs – Formerly Electrician Royal Household
- Peter Thomas Charles Clayton – Head Gamekeeper Crown Estate, Windsor
- David Thomas Evans – Carriage Restorer/Cleaner Royal Mews
- David Charles Lambourn – Office and Travelling Yeoman Household of the Prince of Wales and the Duchess of Cornwall
- Jose Manuel Lazarczuk – Groundsman Crown Estate, Windsor
- Thomas Arnold Watt – Palace Attendant Palace of Holyroodhouse
- Jennifer Denise Whiter – Senior Housekeeping assistant, Windsor Castle

=== The Most Excellent Order of the British Empire ===
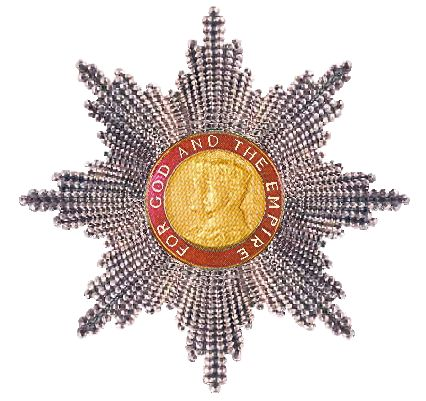
Star of a Knight Grand Cross of the Order of the British Empire

==== Knight / Dame Grand Cross of the Order of the British Empire (GBE) ====
Civil

- Professor Sir John Bell FRS – For services to Medicine Medical Research and the UK Life Science Industry

==== Knight / Dame Commander of the Order of the British Empire (KBE / DBE) ====
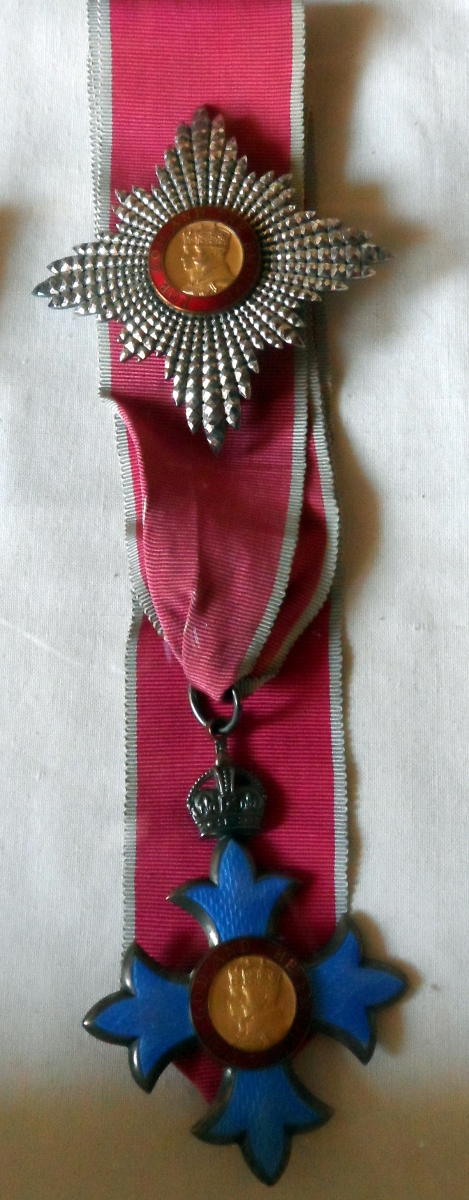
Insignia of a Knight Commander of the Order of the British Empire

Military

- Vice Admiral David Steel CBE DL
- Lieutenant General Gerald Berragan CB

Civil

- Susan Margaret Bruce, Chief Executive, City of Edinburgh Council. For services to Local Government in Scotland.
- Joan Henrietta Collins OBE, Philanthropist and charity campaigner. For services to charity
- Kate Dethridge, Principal, Churchend Primary School, Reading and National Leader of Education. For services to Education.
- Carol Ann Duffy CBE, Poet Laureate. For services to Poetry.
- Oremi Evans, Headteacher, The Brookfield School, Herefordshire. For services to Education.
- Mary Quant (Barbara Greene) OBE. For services to British Fashion.
- Fiona Marie Kendrick, Chair and chief executive officer, Nestlé UK and Ireland. For services to the Food and Drink Industry and to Skills Development.
- The Right Hon. Anne Catherine McGuire MP, Member of Parliament for Stirling. For parliamentary and political services.
- Joyce Evelyn Plotnikoff, Director, Lexicon Ltd. For services to Justice, particularly Vulnerable and Child Witnesses.
- Esther Louise Rantzen (Mrs. Desmond Wilcox) CBE. For services to Children and Older People through ChildLine and The Silver Line.
- Professor Teresa Lesley Rees CBE, Professor of Social Science, Cardiff University and lately Director for Wales, Leadership Foundation for Higher Education. For services to Social Sciences.
- Kristin Scott Thomas OBE, Actress. For services to Drama.
- Professor Eileen Sills CBE, Chief Nurse and Director of Patient Experience, Guy's and St Thomas' NHS Foundation Trust. For services to Nursing.
- Ila Dianne Thompson CBE, lately Group chief executive officer, Camelot. For services to the National Lottery and charitable services.
- Professor Marina Sarah Warner CBE FBA, Professor, School of Arts and Humanities, Birkbeck College, University of London and Fellow, All Souls College, Oxford. For services to Higher Education and Literary Scholarship.
- Catherine Fiona Woolf CBE, lately Lord Mayor of London. For services to the Legal Profession, Diversity and the City of London.

==== Commander of the Order of the British Empire (CBE) ====
Military

- Brigadier Mark William Dunham, OBE – Royal Marines.
- Rear Admiral Russell George Harding, OBE RN
- Rear Admiral Ian Michael Jess RN
- Captain Paul Marshall RN
- Brigadier Benjamin John Bathurst, OBE – Late Welsh Guards
- Brigadier William James Frank Bramble, OBE – Late Royal Regiment of Artillery
- Brigadier Alastair Scott Dickinson – Late Corps of Royal Engineers
- Colonel James Jefferson Learmont – Late Royal Regiment of Artillery
- Brigadier Timothy Patrick Robinson OBE – Late 9th/12th Royal Lancers
- Colonel Mark John Thornhill – Late Royal Regiment of Artillery
- Group Captain Gary Wayne Bunkell QVRM AE ADC – Royal Auxiliary Air Force
- Group Captain Stephen Franklyn Lushington
- Air Commodore Carl Morell Scott AFC

Civil

- Margaret Mary Aspinall – Chair, Hillsborough Family Support Group, Liverpool. For services to Bereaved Hillsborough Families.
- Vivian Inez Archibald – Deputy Governor, British Virgin Islands. For public service in the British Virgin Islands
- Peter Asher – Musician, manager and record producer. For services to the British music industry
- His Honour Judge Brian John Barker QC – Recorder of London. For services to the Administration of Justice and to charity.
- Professor Graeme William Walter Barker FBA – lately Disney Professor of Archaeology and director, McDonald Institute for Archaeological Research, University of Cambridge. For services to Archaeology.
- Trevor Graham Baylis OBE – Inventor and Founder, Trevor Baylis Brands plc. For services to Intellectual Property.
- Martin George Bean – Vice-Chancellor, The Open University. For services to Higher Education.
- Virginia Beardshaw – Chief Executive, I CAN Children's Charity. For services to Children with Special Needs and Disabilities.
- David John Bennett – Chief Executive, Sanctuary Housing Group. For services to Social Housing.
- John Douglas Bonney QFSM – Chief Officer, Hampshire Fire and Rescue Service. For services to Fire Safety
- Christopher Brinsmead – Life Science Champion. For services to UK Life Sciences.
- Professor Alistair Stanyer Burns – National Clinical Director for Dementia. For services to Health and Social Care, particularly Dementia Care.
- James Caan – Founder and chairman, Start Up Loan Company. For services to Entrepreneurship and charitable services through the James Caan Foundation.
- Victor Manuel Chavez – chief executive officer, Thales UK Ltd. For services to the Defence and Security Industry.
- Amanda Elizabeth Chessell – Software Engineer, IBM. For services to Engineering.
- Michael David Lincoln Chowen – Philanthropist. For charitable services.
- Tina Clapham – Ministry of Defence. For services to Defence.
- Margaret Anita Clark OBE – Chair, Hastoe Housing and Plunkett Foundation. For services to Rural Communities.
- Nicholas George Cooper – Chairman, Sterling Insurance Group Ltd. For services to Philanthropy in Higher Education and the Arts.
- Elizabeth Pauline Lucy Corley – CEO, Allianz Global Investors. For services to the Financial Sector.
- Stephen Cram MBE – lately Chair, English Institute of Sport. For services to Sport.
- Alan Davey – Chief Executive, Arts Council England. For services to the Arts.
- Sandra Dawe MBE – lately Chief Executive, VisitBritain. For services to the Tourism Industry.
- Cressida Rose Dick QPM – Assistant Commissioner, Metropolitan Police Service. For services to Policing.
- Dr. Michèle Dix – managing director, Planning, Transport for London. For services to the Transport Industry.
- Wilma Christina Jean Donnelly TD DL – Director of Nursing, Royal College of Nursing (Wales). For services to Nursing, the Armed Forces and Trade Unionism.
- Nigel Wallace Boyd Dunlop – For services to Business and the Economy in Northern Ireland.
- Alan Michael Eccles – chief executive officer and Public Guardian, Office of the Public Guardian. For services to the Administration of Justice and Vulnerable Adults.
- John David Emerson – Chief Executive, Association of Charitable Foundations. For services to Philanthropy and Charitable Giving.
- Keith Exford – Chief Executive, Affinity Sutton Group. For services to Housing in London.
- Professor Ruth Sarah Farwell – Vice-Chancellor, Buckinghamshire New University and lately Chair, GuildHE. For services to Higher Education.
- Professor Russell Foster FRS – Professor of Circadian Neurosciences, University of Oxford. For services to Science.
- Stephen Charles Fox – Chief Executive, BAM Nuttall. For services to Civil Engineering and Construction.
- Catherine Marie Garside – Headteacher, St. Ambrose Barlow Roman Catholic High School, Swinton, Salford. For services to Education.
- Shakuntala Michaela Ghosh – For services to Venture Philanthropy and the Voluntary Sector, especially Homeless and Disadvantaged Young People.
- Rodney Alan Rupert Green – Prior and Chairman of Trustees, Priory of England and the Islands. For voluntary service to the Order of St. John and St. John Ambulance.
- Gillian Guy – chief executive officer, Citizens Advice. For services to Consumers.
- Trevor Hicks – President, Hillsborough Family Support Group. For services to Bereaved Hillsborough Families.
- Brent Shawzin Hoberman – For services to Entrepreneurship.
- Peter Holbrook – For services to Social Enterprise.
- Jason Bruno Acker Holt – Chief Executive, Holts Group and Founder, Holts Academy. For services to the Jewellery Sector and Apprenticeships.
- Robert Eric Hough DL – Chair, Liverpool City Region Local Enterprise Partnership. For services to Business in the North West.
- The Right Hon. John Michael Jack – Chairman, Office of Tax Simplification. For services to Tax Policy.
- Frederick Frank Jarvis – For parliamentary and political services.
- Dr. Thomas Calderwood Johnstone – President and chief executive officer, AB SKF (Svenska Kullager Fabriken). For services to UK/Swedish industrial co-operation
- Richard Jones – Opera and Theatre Director. For services to Music.
- Professor Heather Evelyn Joshi OBE FBA – Emeritus Professor, Centre for Longitudinal Studies. For services to Longitudinal and Women's Studies.
- Judith Pamela Kelly OBE – Artistic Director, Southbank Centre. For services to the Arts.
- Councillor Erica Kemp – Lord Mayor of Liverpool. For public and political service.
- Kathryn Felice Lampard – Independent Overseer, Department of Health and NHS Investigation into Jimmy Savile. For services to the National Health Service and to the community.
- Dr. Ruth Jane Lea – For services to the Financial and Economic Sectors.
- Diane Elizabeth Lees – Director-General, Imperial War Museums. For services to Museums.
- Mary Stewart Macklin – chief executive officer of The Klin Group. For services to Economic Regeneration and Entrepreneurship in Scotland.
- Patrick Sean Maguire – Governing Governor, Maghaberry Prison, Department of Justice. For Public Service to the Northern Ireland Prison Service.
- Dr. Carolyn Makinson – lately Executive Director, International Rescue Committee UK. For services to Humanitarian Relief Programmes.
- Adeeba Malik MBE – Deputy Chief Executive, QED-UK. For services to Interfaith and Community Cohesion.
- Gordon Matheson – For services to Local Government and the community.
- Dr. Alice Mary Maynard – lately Chair, Scope. For services to People with Disabilities and their Families.
- Josephine Helen McArdle – Founder and chairman, Helen McArdle Care. For services to the Care Home Business and the community in the North East of England.
- Dr. Bridget Mary McConnell – Chief Executive, Culture and Sport Glasgow. For services to Culture.
- Uma Mehta – Chief Community Services Lawyer, London Borough of Islington. For services to Children.
- Professor Julienne Elizabeth Meyer – Professor of Nursing Care for Older People. For services to Nursing and Older People.
- David Fraser Middleton – Chief Executive, Transport Scotland. For services to the Civil Service and Transport in Scotland.
- Patricia Lewsley-Mooney – Commissioner for Children and Young People. For services to Children's Rights in Northern Ireland.
- Jonathan Moulds – Philanthropist. For services to the LSO (London Symphony Orchestra).
- Professor Fiona Elizabeth Murray – Professor of Entrepreneurship and Faculty Director, Massachusetts Institute of Technology. For services to entrepreneurship and innovation
- Denis Kevin Myers – Deputy Chief Executive, Health and Safety Executive. For services to Health and Safety.
- Tim Oates – Group Director of Assessment Research and Development, Cambridge Assessment. For services to Education.
- Professor Timothy Noel Palmer FRS – Professor in Climate Physics, University of Oxford. For services to Science.
- Nicholas Pascoe – Regional Manager H.M. Prison Service, Greater London. For services to the Criminal Justice System.
- Professor Sharon Peacock – Clinical Microbiologist, University of Cambridge. For services to Medical Microbiology.
- Joanne Lesley Perez – Co-Head, Policy and Markets Team, Debt Management Office. For services to UK Financial Management.
- Amanda Phillips – Executive Principal, Paradigm Trust, Tower Hamlets, London. For services to Education.
- Sonia Phippard – Director of Water and Flood Risk Management, Department for Environment, Food and Rural Affairs. For services to the Environment and Flood Risk Management.
- Stuart Polak – Director, Conservative Friends of Israel. For political service.
- Professor David Anthony Purser – Toxicologist. For services to Fire Safety.
- Stephen Quartermain – Chief Planner, Department for Communities and Local Government. For services to Planning Infrastructure.
- John Paul Randall – lately Independent Chair, Police Negotiating Board and Police Advisory Board of England and Wales. For services to Policing.
- Professor Peter Wynne Rees – lately City Planning Officer, City of London Corporation. For services to Architecture and Town Planning.
- Reginald Robert Rhoda – Attorney General, Gibraltar. For services to Gibraltar and the law
- Anne Helen Richards CVO – chief investment officer, Aberdeen Asset Management plc. For services to the Financial Services Industry and voluntary service.
- Professor Stephen Michael Richardson – Associate Provost (Institutional Affairs) and Professor of Chemical Engineering, Imperial College London. For services to Chemical Engineering Education.
- Dr. Vivecca Robinson – Chief Executive, National Centre for the 3Rs (NC3Rs). For services to Science and Animal Welfare.
- Professor Fiona Mary Ross— Professor of Primary Care Nursing and Director of Research, Leadership Foundation for Higher Education, Kingston University and St. George's. For services to Nursing.
- Professor Caroline Rush – Chief Executive, British Fashion Council. For services to the British Fashion Industry
- Judith Anne Salter – Headteacher, Glenwood Special School, Essex. For services to Education.
- Michael Paul Sheffield – lately Group chief executive officer, Kier Group plc. For services to Civil Engineering, Construction and Charitable Fundraising.
- Jane Elizabeth Shepherdson MBE – chief executive officer, Whistles. For services to UK Retail Business.
- Ali Smith – Writer. For services to Literature.
- Professor Rosalind Louise Smyth – Director, Institute of Child Health and Professor of Child Health, University College London. For services to Regulation of Medicines for Children.
- Barbara Spicer – lately Interim Chief Executive, Skills Funding Agency. For services to Education, Learning and Skills.
- Sarah Elizabeth Staniforth, Lady Porritt – lately Museums and Collections Director, National Trust. For services to National Heritage.
- Alasdair Glen Stirling – Head of Future Submarines, Ministry of Defence. For services to Defence.
- May Storrie – For services to Business and Philanthropy.
- Michele Sutton OBE – lately Principal and Chief Executive, Bradford College and President, Association of Colleges. For services to Further Education.
- Michael Anthony Sweeney – lately chairman, Henley Royal Regatta. For services to Rowing.
- Meera Syal MBE – Actress, and Author. For services to Drama and Literature.
- John Quinlan Terry – Architect. For services to Classical Architecture.
- Amanda Margaret Tincknell – Chief Executive, Cranfield Trust. For services to the charitable sector.
- Dr. Anna Danielle van der Gaag – Chair, Health and Care Professions Council. For services to Health and Care.
- Dawn Patricia Ward OBE – Principal and Chief Executive, Burton and South Derbyshire College. For services to Further Education.
- Janice Elizabeth Ward – Founder and chief executive officer, Corrotherm International Ltd. For services to Business.
- Thomas Raymond Watkins – lately Consultant in Dental Public Health, NHS Grampian. For services to Healthcare.
- Professor Paul Webley – Director, School of Oriental and African Studies, University of London. For services to Higher Education.
- Jane Melville Wernick – Jane Wernick Associates Ltd. For services to Structural and Civil Engineering.
- Professor Caroline Elizabeth Whalley – Founder, the Elliot Foundation and Trustee, SHINE. For services to Education.
- Michael Wheeler – non-executive director, Department of Health. For services to Healthcare.
- Professor Bill Whyte – Professor of Social Work Studies in Criminal and Youth Justice, University of Edinburgh. For services to Youth Justice in Scotland.
- Amanda Elizabeth Wills – For services to the British Travel Industry and to charity.
- Philip Richard Wood – Special Global Counsel, Allen & Overy. For services to English and Financial Law.
- Roger Wright – Chief Executive, Aldeburgh Music, and lately Director, BBC Proms and Controller, BBC Radio 3. For services to Music.
- Andrew Wyllie – Chief Executive, Costain Group. For services to Construction and Engineering.

==== Officer of the Order of the British Empire (OBE) ====
Military

- Captain Paul Richard Casson RN
- Lieutenant Colonel Simon Chapman – Royal Marines
- Captain Steven Holt RN
- Commander Ian Herbert Lynn RN
- Lieutenant Colonel James Patrick McLaren – Royal Marines
- Commander Stephen Mark Richard Moorhouse RN
- Captain Peter James Towell RN
- Lieutenant Colonel Timothy John Simon Allen – Royal Corps of Signals
- Lieutenant Colonel Robin Baker – Royal Regiment of Artillery
- Lieutenant Colonel Christopher Brendan Kevin Barry – The Royal Welsh
- Lieutenant Colonel Karen Graham – Adjutant General's Corps (Staff and Personnel Support Branch)
- Lieutenant Colonel Andrew Martin Hart – The Royal Irish Regiment
- Lieutenant Colonel Gregory Keith Mark Hughes – The Royal Logistic Corps
- Lieutenant Colonel Andrew David Moffat – The Royal Logistic Corps
- Lieutenant Colonel Dominic Charles Morgan – The Royal Logistic Corps
- Colonel Duncan Anthony Francis Harlidge Parkhouse. QHP – late Royal Army Medical Corps
- Colonel Simon Patrick Plummer, MBE – Late The Rifles
- Lieutenant Colonel Thomas Richard Trinick – Royal Army Medical Corps Army Reserve
- Wing Commander David Scott Arthurton
- Wing Commander Anthony James Baker
- Group Captain David Lucien Bruce, MBE
- Wing Commander Paul Andrew Cole
- Group Captain Mark Hunt
- Group Captain David Cyril McLoughlin
- Group Captain John Clayton Prescott

Civil

- William David Butler-Adams, Managing Director, Brompton Bicycle. For services to UK manufacturing.
- Anthony Olusola Ademola Ageh, Controller of Archive Development, BBC. For services to Digital Media.
- Dr. Mohinder Singh Ahluwalia. For services to interfaith and community cohesion.
- Gulfaraz Ahmed, Headteacher, Parkinson Lane Primary School, Halifax. For services to education.
- Lorraine Faith Allen, Principal, Whitley Academy, Coventry. For services to education.
- Elizabeth Armour, Inspector, Education and Training Inspectorate, Department of Education, Northern Ireland Executive. For services to education in Northern Ireland.
- William James Armstrong, Lately Senior Coroner for Norfolk. For services to the bereaved and to charity.
- Julie Anne Ashdown. For services to Equality and Diversity.
- Joanne Allison Ashworth, Director of Forensic Services of East Midlands Police Forces. For services to forensic science.
- Fergus Stephen Auld, Political Counsellor, British Embassy, Moscow, Russia. For services to British interests in Russia.
- Joan Baird, Board Member, Clanmil Housing Association Limited. For services to housing and the community in Northern Ireland.
- Tamsin Kate Baldwin, Executive Director and Trauma Care Worker, Imara. For services to child protection.
- Cecil Balmond, Architect. For services to architecture.
- Allan David Bantick, Lately Chairman, Scottish Wildlife Trust. For services to conservation in Scotland.
- Joan Dorothy Bartholomew. For charitable services.
- Brendon Batson, MBE. For services to football.
- Diana Carolyn Beattie, Director, Heritage of London Trust. For services to heritage in London.
- Rodney John Bennion, Lately Chair of Trustees, Construction Youth Trust. For services to Construction Training and the Community in the South East.
- Steven John Berry, Team Leader, Department for Transport. For services to local transport resilience.
- Elizabeth Anne Bingham. For services to equality in the workplace.
- Professor Diane Joan Birch, Professor of Law, University of Nottingham. For services to higher education.
- Jennifer Ann Christine Bishop. For services to the trans community.
- Helen Ruth Bond. For services to the Women's Institute and to the community in Cambridge.
- Colin Booth, Principal, Barnsley College. For services to further education.
- Dr. Helen Bowcock, Philanthropist. For services to community philanthropy.
- James Richard Wesley Boyce. For services to football in Northern Ireland.
- Adam Michael Bacher Boys, Chief Operating Officer, International Commission on Missing Persons. For services to conflict prevention and resolution, particularly in the Western Balkans.
- Professor Peter Riven Braude, Emeritus Professor of Obstetrics and Gynaecology, King's College London. For services to reproductive medicine.
- Susan Jean Stewart Brimelow, Chief Inspector, Healthcare Environment Inspectorate. For services to patient care and safety.
- Stephanie Brivio, Assistant Director, Child Protection, Safeguarding Group, Department for Education. For services to child protection and to the community in Medway.
- Charles Brice Brookson, Chairman, Network and Information Security Steering Group and formerly Chairman of Global System for Mobile Association Security Group. For services to telecommunications security.
- Sarah Broughton, First Secretary, British Embassy, The Hague, Netherlands. For services to British interests in the Organisation for the Prohibition of Chemical Weapons.
- Kenny Brown, Governor, H.M. Prison Wandsworth. For services to H.M. Prison Service.
- Professor Margaret Louise Brown. For services to mathematics education and to governance of schools in South London.
- Rebecca Catherine Bryant, Head of Crime and Disorder Directorate, Manchester City Council. For services to the community and victim support in Manchester.
- Professor Stewart Brymer, Honorary President and lately chairman, Dundee Heritage Trust. For voluntary service to culture and heritage in Dundee.
- Jennifer Mary Brzozowska, Head, Oil and Gas Exploration. For services to oil and gas infrastructure.
- Dr. Sarah Buck, Fellow, Institution of Structural Engineers and director, BSW Consulting, Exeter. For services to engineering and education.
- David Bull. For services to young people in the UK and Europe through the Scout movement.
- Professor David George Burnett, Professor of Anthropology, Sichuan Normal University, China. For services to education and interfaith relations in China.
- Elizabeth Kelly Cameron, Chief Executive, Scottish Chambers of Commerce. For services to business and commerce.
- Alastair John Wilson Campbell, Chairman, Campbell Lutyens and Co Ltd. For services to financial services and charitable fundraising.
- Michael Brian Cantlay, Chairman, VisitScotland. For services to the tourism and hospitality industry in Scotland.
- Elizabeth Anne Carriere, Head, South Sudan, Department for International Development. For services to development and leadership in South Sudan.
- Dr. Hilary Dawn Cass, President, Royal College of Paediatrics and Child Health. For services to child health.
- Raymond Cathline, Business Support Team, Digitalisation Programme, Department for Work and Pensions. For services to jobseekers, diversity and to the community in Enfield.
- William Mackenzie Cattanach, Head, Pilot Secretariat, Department of Energy and Climate Change. For services to oil and gas Infrastructure.
- Colonel Edward Paul Ronald Cautley, CMG, DL, Colonel Commandant, Royal Marines Cadets. For voluntary service to the cadet forces.
- Adam Vincent Stewart Chedburn, Headteacher, Whitley Bay High School, Tyne and Wear. For services to education.
- Philip John Chesworth, Lately Detective Sergeant, Police Scotland. For services to counter terrorism.
- Matthew Shackleton Chinn, Managing Director, Energy Sector, Siemens Plc. For services to the UK renewable energy industry.
- Anne Chisholm, Lately Chair, the Royal Society of Literature. For services to literature.
- Jerome Wilfrid Church, MBE, General Secretary, The British Limbless Ex-service Men's Association. For services to veterans.
- Robert Clegg. For services to the community in Rochdale.
- Ian Clinton, Lately Principal, Blackburn College. For services to further education.
- Dr. Beverly Jane Collett, Consultant in Pain Management, University Hospitals of Leicester NHS Trust. For services To Pain Management.
- Dr. David Gordon Collier, Chief Executive, England and Wales Cricket Board. For services to cricket.
- Professor Cyrus Cooper, Director, Medical Research Council Lifecourse Epidemiology Unit, Universities of Southampton and Oxford. For services to medical research.
- James Kimberly Corden, Actor. For services to drama.
- Arthur Cormack, Gaelic singer and Chief Executive, Fèisean nan Gàidheal. For services to Gaelic education.
- Henry Richard Geers Cotterell, Lately President, Country Landowners' Association. For services to the rural community and to charity.
- Janene Cox, President, Society of Chief Librarians. For services to libraries.
- Roy Frederick Cox, Chair, Sense Scotland. For services to the deafblind.
- Susan Mary Crowley, Chair, Institute for Learning. For services to Further Education and Teaching.
- Dr. Howard John Cummins, Counsellor, Foreign and Commonwealth Office. For services to British foreign policy interests.
- Judge John Joseph Curran. For services to the judiciary and the community in Northern Ireland.
- Dr. Lesley Sharon Curtis, Headteacher, Everton Nursery School and Family Centre of Liverpool. For services to education.
- Peter John Robert Dahlstrom, Headteacher, Hope Special School, Wigan. For services to education.
- James Christopher Meredith Davies, DL. For services to charity and the community in Merseyside.
- Michael John Davies, Head of Maritime Resilience, Planning and Consequence Management, Department for Transport. For services to maritime safety.
- Elizabeth Fiona Davis, Lately Director, Natural Resources Wales. For public service.
- Julie Deane, Co-owner and Founder, The Cambridge Satchel Company. For services to entrepreneurship.
- Harriet Logan Dempster. For services to child welfare in Scotland.
- Es Devlin, Stage and set designer. For services to stage and set design.
- Norman Dewis. For services to the motor industry.
- Jon Mark Doig, Chief Executive, Commonwealth Games Scotland. For services to sport.
- Christopher Martin Earnshaw. For services to engineering and technology.
- Professor Paul Ekins, Director and Professor of Resources and Environment Policy, UCL Institute for Sustainable Resources. services to environmental policy.
- Ian Elgy, Principal Armour Specialist. For services in support of military operations.
- David Etheridge, Chief Fire Officer, Oxfordshire County Council. For services to the community.
- Judith, Ms. Evans, lately Chair of the Governing Council, St George's, University of London. For services to higher education.
- Melville Stanley Evans, Lately Chair, Powys Teaching Health Board. For services to the NHS in Wales.
- Paul William Farmer, Managing Director, Wade Ceramics Ltd. for services to international trade and the ceramics industry in Stoke-on-Trent.
- Dr. John Damien Fay, Director, College of Agriculture, Food and Rural Enterprise, Northern Ireland Executive. For services to Agri-food Education.
- Alan Ferguson, Chairman and Chief Executive, Fergusons Transport Ltd. for services to business in the North East.
- Timothy Fisher, Ministry of Defence. For services To Defence.
- John Robert Flamson, DL, Director, Liverpool City Challenge. For services To Business and the Community in Liverpool.
- Paul Forman, Ministry of Defence. For services to defence.
- Peter William Foster, President, Air Astana, Kazakhstan. For services to British aviation in Kazakhstan.
- Alison Fryatt, Lately Head of Health and Safety Sponsorship Team. For public service.
- Dr. Bernadette Fuge, Chair, Age Cymru. For voluntary services to older people in Wales.
- Clara Leonara Gardiner, Permanent Secretary, Ministry of Border Control and Labour, Turks and Caicos Islands. For services to the immigration policy in the Overseas Territories.
- David Edmund Talbot Garman, Lately Chair, Mangar International. For services to the healthcare industry.
- Jane Susan Gates, Chief Executive, Sebastian's Actions Trust. For services to seriously ill children and their families in the South East.
- Barbara Gelb, Chief Executive Officer, Together for Short Lives, Bristol. For services to improving Care Services For Children.
- Colonel Robin Dewhurst Gibson, MBE, Chief Executive, Lowlands Reserve Forces' and Cadets' Association. For services to the armed forces.
- Edward William Gillespie, DL. For services to horse racing in Cheltenham, Gloucestershire.
- Dr. George Thompson Gillespie, Chief Executive Officer, Mira Ltd. For services to international trade.
- Jill Carolyn Gloster, Lately Chief Commissioner, Scoutswales. For services to the Scouting movement in Wales.
- Kathleen Ann Gore, DL. For services to charity and to the community in East Sussex, particularly to hospice care.
- Robert Terence Grace, Regional President, Jaguar Land Rover, China. For services to the Automotive industry and to promoting British trade in China.
- Archibald Graham, Deputy Leader, Glasgow City Council. For services to the Commonwealth Games 2014 and local government.
- Lynn Greenwold, Chief Executive Officer, Professional Association of Teachers of Students with specific learning difficulties. For services To special educational needs.
- Stuart Mark Griffiths, Chief Executive, Birmingham Hippodrome. For services to the arts in Birmingham.
- Charlotte Anne Grobien. For charitable services to Children and Young People in Wandsworth, Greater London and Surrey.
- David Boyd Guilfoyle, Chief Executive, Youth Council For Northern Ireland. For services to the Community, Particularly Young People in Belfast.
- Stephen Guyon, Lead For Rough Sleeping and Single Homelessness, Department for Communities and Local Government. For services to rough sleepers.
- Alexander Richard Hamilton. For services to maritime heritage.
- John Michael Hancock, Former President and Chairman, British American Business Council. For services to British commercial and economic interests in the USA.
- Dr. Robert Hardy, Chief Executive, Aesica Pharmaceuticals Ltd. For services to the pharmaceutical and chemical industry.
- Ian Hart, Department for Education Liaison Officer, National Network for Children in Employment and Entertainment. For services To Children.
- Sally Hawkridge, Ministry of Defence. For services to defence.
- Francis Xavier Hester, Founder and Chief Executive Officer of The Phoenix Partnership. For services To Healthcare.
- Professor Stephen Gilbert Hillier, Vice-Principal, International University of Edinburgh. For services to international higher education.
- Geoffrey Alan Hope, Stabilisation Adviser, Helmand Provincial Reconstruction Team, Department for International Development. For services to Stabilisation and Development in Afghanistan.
- Professor Geoffrey Hosking, Emeritus Professor of Russian History, School of Slavonic Studies, University College London and co-founder, Nightline. For services to higher education and students.
- Anne Catherine Houston, Lately Chief Executive, Children 1st. For services to children and young people.
- Pauline Jean Howie, Chief Executive, Scottish Ambulance Service. For services to NHS Scotland and to the Scottish Ambulance Service.
- David John Hudson, Executive Headteacher, Wickersley School and Sports College, Rawmarsh Community School and Clifton Community School, Rotherham. For services to education.
- Leslie Hughes. For services to the insurance industry and to the community in Northern Ireland.
- Joan Hunt, Honorary Professor, Cardiff Law School. For services to children.
- Nicholas Simon Hurn, Executive Headteacher, Cardinal Hume Catholic School, Gateshead and St. Robert of Newminster School, Sunderland. For services to education.
- Kevin Paul Hyland, lately Detective Inspector, Metropolitan Police Service. For services to combating human trafficking.
- Anthony Jennens, Chair, Gamcare. For charitable services in the Prevention And Treatment of Gambling Addiction.
- Susan Johnson. For services To ladies' golf.
- Dr. Jacqui Lunday Johnstone, Chief Health Professions Officer, Scottish Government. For services To Healthcare and the Health Care Professions.
- David Baden Jones, DL, Principal and Chief Executive, Coleg Cambria and lately principal and chief executive, Deeside College. For services to further education in North East Wales.
- Elizabeth Jones, Postgraduate Dental Dean, London. For services to dental education.
- Dr. Glynn Jones, DL. For services to the community in Sussex.
- Patricia Joyce Jones, Founder and Chief Executive Officer, Bristol Dyslexia Centre. For services to education.
- Dr. Gwen Parry-Jones, Safety and Assurance Director, Nuclear Generation, EDF Energy. For services to science and technology.
- Maud Kells, Nurse, WEC International. For services to people in the Democratic Republic of Congo.
- Wendy Kennedy, Head, Offshore Oil and Gas Environment and Decommissioning, Department of Energy and Climate Change. For services to the Oil And Gas Industry.
- Lynne Kilpatrick, Head of Video Games, Department For Culture, Media And Sport. For services to the Video Games Industry.
- Dr. John Kirkland, Executive Secretary, Commonwealth Scholarship Commission. For services to international Scholarships and Commonwealth Universities.
- Susan Langley. For services to Women in Business.
- Jeanetta Christine Laurence, Lately Associate Director, Royal Ballet. For services To Dance.
- Dr. William Lawler, Forensic Pathologist. For services To the Police And Criminal Justice System.
- Edmée Pistis Leventis. For services to Arts Philanthropy.
- Faith Liddell, Director, Festivals Edinburgh. For services to the Arts.
- Keith Loudon. For services to business and to the community in Leeds – West Yorkshire.
- Philip Lowthian, Head, Regional Benefits (disability), Department for Work and Pensions. For services to the unemployed in North West England And Manchester.
- John David Peter Lubbock. For services to the Orchestra of St. John's and people with autism and learning difficulties in the UK.
- Iain Andrew Lunt, First Secretary, British Embassy, Kyiv, Ukraine. For services to international affairs.
- Mary Louise Macdonald (Louise Halliday), Chief Executive Officer, Young Scot. For services to young people and the community in Scotland.
- James Patrick Ray Maddan, Neighbourhood Watch volunteer. For services to policing and community safety.
- Peter Madden, Lately Chief Executive Officer, Forum for the Future. For services to Environmental Protection And Sustainable Development.
- Séamus Magee, Head of Office, Electoral Commission in Northern Ireland. For services to democracy.
- Dr. Roshan Maini. For services to the life sciences industry.
- Dr. Graeme Peter Alexander Malcolm, Chief Executive Officer, M Squared Lasers. For services to science and innovation.
- Laura Elizabeth Marks, Founder, Mitzvah Day. For services to interfaith relations.
- Tom Martin, JP, DL. For services to business and the community in the East Riding of Yorkshire.
- Paul Anthony Mascarenas, formerly Chief Technical Officer and Vice-President, Ford Motor Company. For services to the automotive industry.
- Robert John Maskrey. For voluntary and charitable services to the Arts and the community in Wales and Herefordshire.
- Patricia McAuley, Lately Senior Director Scotland, Consumer Futures. For services to consumer affairs.
- Brigid McBride, Digital Director, London, H.M. Revenue and Customs. For services to UK digital transformation.
- Arlene McCarthy, Lately Member of the European Parliament for North West England. For parliamentary and political services.
- Mary Margaret Geraldine McGahey, Chief Executive, Larne Borough Council. For services To Local Government.
- Mark Gerard McGreevy. For services To Homeless People in the UK And Abroad.
- Maureen McKenna, Director of Education, Glasgow City Council. For services To Education in Scotland And Malawi.
- Robert Joseph McLoughlin. For services To Broadcasting in the North West.
- Anne Patricia McPhee. For political service in Scotland.
- Daniel McSorley, Chief Executive, Omagh District Council And Interim Chief Executive, Strabane District Council. For services To Local Government.
- Wendy Mead, Chairman, City's Health And Social Care Scrutiny Sub Committee. For civic And community services in London.
- Robert Carl Messenger, Deputy Director, Treasury Solicitor's Department. For services To Government Legal Services.
- Professor Robert Hamilton Millar, Emeritus Professor, Centre For Innovation And Research in Science Education, University of York. For services To Science Education.
- Jane Caroline Miller, Team Leader And Senior Health Adviser, Department For International Development. For services To Development in Africa, Particularly Female Genital Mutilation.
- Andrew Brett Milligan, Lately Board Member, Technology Strategy Board And Head of Global Strategy, Standard Life Investments. For services To Innovation and the Economy.
- Richard George Millington, Executive Principal, Chepping View Primary School, Buckinghamshire. For services To Education.
- Professor Ian Mark Mills, FRS, Emeritus Professor of Chemical Spectroscopy, University of Reading And Emeritus President, Comite Consultatif Des Unites. For Services To Chemistry And Metrology.
- Bruce Minto, Chairman, Board of Trustees, National Museums Scotland. For services To Culture.
- William John Clyde Mitchell, lately Country Director, British Council, Afghanistan. For services to UK/Afghanistan cultural relations.
- Jeremy Charles Moore, Liaison Officer For Road Policing, Association of Chief Police Officers. For services To Road Safety And Policing.
- Denise Ellen Moreton. For services to the Women's Institute Movement in Staffordshire.
- Carol Allison Morris, Work Services Director For London and the Home Counties. For services To Jobseekers.
- John Malcolm Morris, Headteacher, Ardleigh Green Junior School, Havering. For services To Education.
- Julie Morrow, Head, Appletree And Stoneygate Nursery Schools And Children's Centres, Lancashire. For services To Children And Families.
- Robin John Jennings Moseley, formerly Chief Executive Officer, Dyslexia Association of Singapore. For services to children with dyslexia and to education in Singapore.
- Sajda Mughal. For services To Community Cohesion And Interfaith Dialogue.
- Sidney Charles (Charlie) Mullins, Founder and Chief Executive, Pimlico Plumbers. For services to the Plumbing Industry.
- Graham John Mungeam, Non-Executive Chairman, Oasis Community Learning. For services To Children And Families.
- Heather Munro, Lately Chief Executive, London Probation Trust. For services To Probation, Rehabilitation And Criminal Justice.
- Dr. Anne Philomena Murray, Principal, Oakgrove Integrated Primary And Nursery School. For services To Education.
- Professor Venugopal Karunakaran Nair, Head of Avian Viral Diseases Programme, Pirbright Institute. For services To Science.
- Professor Dilip Nathwani, Director of Medical Education, NHS Scotland. For services To Treatment of Infectious Diseases.
- John Leslie Newbigin, Chair, Creative England. For services to the Creative Industries and the Arts.
- William Benedict Nicholson, Screenwriter And Author. For services To Drama And Literature.
- Francesca Osowska, Director, Commonwealth Games And Sport, Scottish Government. For services To Government and the Commonwealth Games.
- Robert Owen, Chief Executive Officer, St. Giles Trust. For services to the Rehabilitation of Offenders.
- Jean Palmer, Deputy Chief Executive And Corporate Director of Residents Services, Hillingdon Council. For services To Local Government.
- Ewart West Parkinson. For voluntary And charitable services in Cardiff.
- Arthur John Loftus Patterson, Chairman, British Business Group, Baku. For services to British commercial interests in Azerbaijan.
- Michael Brian Pears, Assistant Director, Academies Group, Ifd, Department For Education. For Services To Education And to the Community in Hounslow.
- David Philip Pearson. For charitable services.
- Professor Sarah Elizabeth Dorothy Perrett, Principal Investigator, Chinese Academy of Sciences Institute of Biophysics, Beijing, China. For services to UK/China relations in the scientific field.
- Jennifer Clare Preece–Bill, Principal Manager, Childcare, Special Educational Needs And Children's Strategy, Department For Education. For services To Children.
- Katharine Riddell Pugh, Chief Executive, The Heritage Alliance. For services To Heritage.
- Dr. David Alasdair Hornley Rae, FRSE, Lately Director of Horticulture And Learning, Royal Botanic Garden Edinburgh. For services To Horticulture And Education.
- Dr. Babu Mizanur Rahman, United National Assistance Mission in Somalia, Mogadishu, Somalia. For services to peace building and conflict prevention in Somalia.
- Dr. Ruth Louise Mallors-Ray, Lately Director of Aerospace And Defence, Knowledge Transfer Networks. For services To Science, Innovation And Knowledge Transfer.
- Maura Regan, Principal, Carmel College And Chief Executive, Carmel Education Trust. For services To Education.
- Paul Joseph Gordon Rennie, Head of Political and Bilateral Affairs, British High Commission, New Delhi, India. For services to UK/India relations.
- David Reynolds, DL, Farmer And Director, Camgrain. For services To Agriculture and the Community in the East Midlands.
- John Stuart Rhodes. For services to the Economy Planning and the Community.
- Eve Sarah Richardson, Lately Chief Executive, National Council For Palliative Care. For services To End of Life Care.
- Christopher Ridley, Lately Director of Financial Management, House of Commons. For services To Public Finances And Voluntary Service To Campanology.
- Dr. Timothy William Robson. For services to the Homeless in Hertfordshire.
- Lieutenant Colonel Peter Albert Roffey, DL. For services to the Community in Leicestershire.
- Barrie Thomas Rutter, Founder And Artistic Director, Northern Broadsides. For services To Drama.
- Colonel Christopher Sanderson, MBE, Director Government Support, Control Risks. For services to higher professional standards in the international private security industry.
- Mark Lindsay Sanderson, Lately Head of Major Events Team, Office For Security And Counter Terrorism, Home Office. For services To Counter Terrorism.
- Surat Singh Sangha, Managing Director, Asiana Ltd. For services To Entrepreneurship.
- Dr. John William Scadding, Consultant Neurology Adviser, Ministry of Defence. For services To Medical Research And Defence.
- Margrit Wendy Scott, President, Association for the Professional Development of Early Years Educators. For services To Education.
- Professor Kenneth Richard Seddon, Director, Queen's University Ionic Liquid Laboratories (quill), Queen's University Belfast. For services To Chemistry.
- Joseph Seelig, Founder, London International Mime Festival. For services To Theatre.
- Jatinder Kumar Sharma, Principal And Chief Executive, Walsall College. For services To Further Education.
- Ian Martin Shaw, Head, Management of Regional Development Agencies Residuary Assets And Liabilities Team, Department For Business, Innovation And Skills. For services To Business.
- Dasha Wendy Shenkman. For services To Philanthropy and the Arts.
- Dr. John Anthony Simmonds, Director of Policy, Research And Development, British Association For Adoption And Fostering. For services To Children And Families.
- Rosaleen Moriarty-Simmonds. For services to the Equality And Rights of Disabled People.
- Mark David Simmons, Director, Royal Bank of Scotland Group. For services to the financial services industry.
- Justine Mary Simons, Head of Cultural Policy, Mayor of London's Office. For services To Culture in London.
- Brian Simpson, Lately Member of the European Parliament For North West England. For Parliamentary And Political services.
- Professor Iram Siraj, Professor of Early Childhood Education, Institute of Education, University of London. For services To Education.
- Jeffrey Skidmore, Conductor And Artistic Director, Ex Cathedra. For services To Choral Music.
- Roy Mckinley Slater. For services To Business And Charity in Scotland.
- Eric Roger Smith, Director of People And Learning, British Red Cross. For services To First Aid.
- Frank Leslie Smith, Chair of Governing Body, Chesterfield College. For services To Further Education.
- Mardy Smith, Principal, New College, Worcester. For services To Education.
- Sheridan Smith, Actress. For services To Drama.
- Margaret Ann Souyave. For services To Hockey.
- Professor Nigel James Sparrow, Senior National GP Adviser, Care Quality Commission. For services To Primary Care.
- Charles Spencer, Chairman, The Spencer Group. For services To Business and the Economy in the Hull And Humber Region.
- Professor Sarah Katherine Spurgeon, Professor of Control Engineering, University of Kent. For services To Engineering.
- John Edward Stainton, Defence Counsellor, British Embassy, Kabul, Afghanistan. For services to British military interests in Afghanistan.
- Professor Gwyneth Mary Stallard, Professor of Pure Mathematics, The Open University. For services To Higher Education.
- Julie Mary Caroline Staun, lately President, Federation of Occupational Health Nurses in the European Union. For services to occupational health care in Denmark.
- David Purcell Stewart. For charitable services, especially to the Health And Housing Sector in London And Surrey.
- Jean Roberta, Lady Stoddart, DL. For services To Health And Charity in Merseyside.
- Heather Mary Suksem, Regional Chief Executive Officer, South Asia, South East Asia and Middle East, OCS ROH Limited. For services to British business interests in Thailand and to community and charitable interests in Thailand.
- Davina Louise Tanner, Chief Executive and Founder, Britannia Enterprises. For services to business and the community in East Anglia.
- William Robert Thomson, Finance Manager, Scottish Prison Service. For services to the criminal justice system.
- Joan Mary Tice, DL. For charitable services through the Bernard Sunley Charitable Foundation.
- Jenny Margaret Tooth, chief executive officer, UK Business Angels Association. For services to small businesses.
- Adrian Tranter, President, British Taekwondo. For services to martial arts.
- Peter Truesdale, Lately Councillor, Lambeth Council. For public and political services.
- Henry Campbell Tweedie, Chair, Northern Ireland Meat Exporters' Association. For services to the Red Meat Industry and the Community in Northern Ireland.
- Elizabeth Kathleen Tysoe, Lately Head of Healthcare Inspection, H.M. Inspectorate of Prisons. For services To Offender Health.
- Simon Robert Vincent, President, Europe, Middle East and Africa, Hilton Worldwide. For services to the hospitality industry.
- Martyn John Wade, Lately National Librarian and Chief Executive, National Library of Scotland. For services to culture in Scotland.
- Rachel Catherine Wakeman, Executive Director and Trauma Care Worker, Imara. For services to child protection.
- Charles Walker, Member of Parliament for Broxbourne. For political service.
- David John Ward, Route Managing Director, South East, Network Rail. For services to the rail industry.
- James Adam Robertson Ernest Ward, Crown Advocate, Crown Court Advocacy Unit, Crown Prosecution Service. For services to law and order in the South West and service to the community.
- Professor Valerie Wass, Head, School of Medicine, Keele University and Elected Member, Medical School Council Executive, London. For services To Medical Education.
- Emily Margaret Watson, Actress. For services to drama.
- Eion Watts, Leader, Bolsover District Council. For services to local government.
- Andrew James Webb, Senior Policy Adviser, Indirect Tax, London, H.M. Revenue and Customs. For services to tax.
- Tessa Mary Webb, Lately Chief Executive Hertfordshire Probation Trust. For services to probation.
- Ashton West, Chief Executive, Motor Insurers' Bureau. For services to road safety.
- Professor Christopher Allan Whatley, Lately Vice-Principal, University of Dundee. For services to Scottish history education.
- Sharon Mary White, Founding Member, School and Public Health Nurses Association. For services to public health nursing for school-aged children.
- Professor Alan Walter Whiteside, Former Executive Director, Health Economics and HIV/AIDS Research Division, University of KwaZulu-Natal, Durban, South Africa. For services to science and strategic interventions to curb HIV/AIDS.
- Roger Brian Whorrod, Member of Council, University of Bath. For services to philanthropy in higher education.
- Margaret Willcox, Commissioning Director for Adults, Gloucestershire County Council. For services to vulnerable people in the South West.
- Professor Hugh Godfrey Maturin Williamson, FBA, Lately Regius Professor of Hebrew, University of Oxford. For Services To Scholarship And Theology.
- Eric Arthur Windsor, lately Chairman, National Bench Chairmen's Forum. For services to the administration of justice.
- Colonel Edward Christopher York. For services to charity and the community in North Yorkshire.

==== Member of the Order of the British Empire (MBE) ====
Military

- Lieutenant Jack Bright, RN
- Warrant Office Class 2 (Communications Technician) Stephen Bullen – Royal Naval Reserve
- Chief Petty Officer Airman (Aircraft handler) John Campbell – Royal Naval Reserve
- Lieutenant Commander Shatadeep Chatterjee, RN
- Warrant Officer Class 1 (Physical Trainer) Darren Sean Childs
- Lieutenant Colonel Anthony Luciano De Reya – Royal Marines
- chief petty officer Engineering Technician (Marine Engineering Submarines) Colin Duguid
- Major Darren Hunt, MM – Royal Marines
- Paul Wilson McArthur – Royal Marines
- Lieutenant Commander Rachel Mary Singleton, RN
- Lieutenant (Acting Lieutenant Commander) Graham Thorley, RN
- Lieutenant Commander Peter James Whitehead, RN
- Warrant Officer Class 2 (Acting Warrant Officer Class 1) Air Engineering Technician Stephen Paul Wood
- Acting Colonel Markham Patrick Bryant – Army Cadet Force
- Lieutenant Colonel Brian Thomas Burke – Corps of Royal Electrical and Mechanical Engineers
- Lieutenant Colonel David Stewart Clouston – The Royal Logistic Corps
- Major Christopher Colin Elworthy – Corps of Royal Engineers
- Captain Timothy Mathew Fleming – The Parachute Regiment Army Reserve
- Major James Richard Hamilton Gayner – The Rifles
- Lieutenant Colonel Jonathan James Greaves – Corps of Royal Engineers
- Major Alec Ewart Harvey – Royal Regiment of Artillery
- Captain Darren David Hembery – Corps of Royal Engineers
- Warrant Officer Class 2 Mark Adrian Hill – The Yorkshire Regiment Army Reserve
- Major Benjamin Matthew David Ingham – Royal Regiment of Artillery
- Warrant Officer Class 1 Andrew Mark James – Adjutant General's Corps (Staff and Personnel Support Branch)
- Warrant Officer Class 1 Andrew George Johnson – Royal Corps of Signals
- Warrant Officer Class 2 Benn Laidler – Army Air Corps
- Major Brian David Lamont – Corps of Royal Electrical and Mechanical Engineers
- Major Andrew Mark Lewis – Royal Army Medical Corps
- Major Gerard Long – The Princess of Wales's Royal Regiment Army Reserve
- Lieutenant Colonel James Owen McCay Lyttle, TD. The Royal Irish Regiment, Army Reserve
- Major Norman MacKinnon – The Royal Regiment of Scotland
- Major Graham Alexander Martin – Adjutant General's Corps (Educational and Training Services Branch)
- Major Guy John Nathaniel Mason – The Royal Logistic Corps
- Warrant Officer Class 2 John McClelland – Intelligence Corps Army Reserve
- Major Victoria Ellen McNeill – Adjutant General's Corps (Royal Military Police)
- Acting Major Douglas Charles Muirhead – The Parachute Regiment
- Warrant Officer Class 2 Louise Victoria O'Connell – Adjutant General's Corps (Staff and Personnel Support Branch)
- Acting Lieutenant Colonel Alan Francis O'Flanagan – Army Cadet Force
- Major Colin Malcolm Oliver – The Rifles
- Lieutenant Colonel Melvin Pears – Irish Guards
- Major Karen Peek – Royal Regiment of Artillery
- Lieutenant Colonel Nicholas Mark Peek – Royal Regiment of Artillery
- Captain Euan Gordon Philbin – The Royal Regiment of Scotland
- Acting Colonel Trevor Ernest Richmond – Army Cadet Force
- Major David Rook – Royal Corps of Signals
- Warrant Officer Class 1 William Roy – The Royal Irish Regiment
- Lieutenant Colonel Ian Simpson – Royal Army Medical Corps
- Warrant Officer Class 2 Paul Benjamin Simpson – Corps of Royal Electrical and Mechanical Engineers
- Major William Stables – The Royal Logistic Corps
- Captain Steven Andrew Stewart – The Royal Dragoon Guards
- Major Hiroshi Thessalus Theodorakakis – The Royal Logistic Corps
- Acting Sergeant Peter Trickovic – The Royal Regiment of Scotland
- Major John Weetman – Army Air Corps
- Warrant Officer Class 2 Paul Julian Westcott – Royal Corps of Signals
- Captain Timothy Stephen Whiteway – Royal Regiment of Artillery
- Captain Lee Duncan Wildey – The Yorkshire Regiment
- Flight Sergeant Vincent Roy Bartlett
- Senior Air Craftman Adam John Bruerton
- Squadron Leader Robin Anthony Caine
- Squadron Leader Heather Ann Clarke
- Warrant Officer Sandra Flatt – Royal Air Force
- Squadron Leader Gary Antony Lane – Royal Air Force Volunteer Reserve
- Warrant Officer John Joseph Morgan – Royal Air Force
- Master Aircrew Nigel Stephen Painter
- Squadron Leader Andre Pelcot – Royal Air Force Reserve
- Warrant Officer Philip Andrew Rodd – Royal Air Force
- Squadron Leader Thomas Leslie Stevenson
- Squadron Leader James Howard Turner
- Squadron Leader Colin Welsh

Civil

- Shabana Iltaf Abasi, Head of Service, Cafcass Greater Manchester. For services to Children in Greater Manchester.
- Councillor Elizabeth Adger, Member, Ballymena Borough Council. For services to Local Government and Young People in Northern Ireland.
- Alderman William Alexander Fraser Agnew, Alderman, Newtownabbey Borough Council. For services to Local Government and Cross Border Relations.
- Elkhidir Daloum Mahmoud Ahmed, Former Regional Director for Latin American, Caribbean and Middle East, Save the Children. For services to the protection of children in Africa.
- Waqar Afzal Ahmed, Prevent Manager, Birmingham City Council. For services to challenging extremism and empowering communities.
- Shahnaz Akhtar, Foster Carer, Slough. For services to Children and Families.
- Margaret Aldwin, Founding Member and Trustee, Ichthyosis Support Group. For services to People with Genetic Disorders and their Families.
- Robert Thomson Allan, National Chairman, Royal British Legion Scotland. For voluntary service to Service Personnel and Veterans.
- Valerie Margaret Allen. For services to Business and to the community in Warrington and Halton, Cheshire.
- Robert Anderson, Chairman, South Lanarkshire Carers Network. For services to Carers in Lanarkshire.
- Fiona Jane Andrews, Director, Smokefree South West. For services to Public Health and Tobacco Control.
- Michael James Andrews, lately Foster Carer, Hampshire County Council. For services to Children and Families.
- Valerie Claire Andrews, lately Foster Carer, Hampshire County Council. For services to Children and Families.
- Jason Peter Anker, Director, Jason Anker Live Ltd. For services to Health and Safety in the Construction Industry.
- Graham Clive Apps, Manager, UK Missing Persons Bureau, National Crime Agency. For services to Law Enforcement in Safeguarding Vulnerable Persons.
- Professor Uduak Archibong, Professor of Diversity, University of Bradford. For services to Higher Education and Equality.
- Henry Anthony Armstrong, Engineering Technician, Department for Regional Development, Northern Ireland Executive. For services to Transport and charitable fundraising.
- David John Ashmore, lately Chief Executive, Greensquare Group and Member, Swindon and Wiltshire Local Enterprise Partnership. For services to Housing in the South West of England.
- Ulfat Shahin Ashraf, Muslim Chaplain, Birmingham. For services to Interfaith and Community Cohesion.
- Justine Assal, Entrepreneur. For services to British commercial interests, in particular UK/Central Florida tourism.
- Felicity Ann Dawn Aston, Antarctic Explorer. For services to Polar Exploration.
- Carole Margaret Louise Atkinson, Volunteer, Metropolitan Police Service. For voluntary service to the community in the London Borough of Richmond upon Thames.
- Sylvia Ruth Avgherinos, Executive Director of Joshua Orphan and Community Care Centre, Blantyre, Malawi. For services to charity and to the community in Malawi.
- Hasan Bakhshi, Director, Creative Economy in Policy and Research, Nesta. For services to the Creative Industries.
- Neil Dennis Baldwin. For services to the Nuclear Industry, particularly Civil Nuclear Engineering and Decommissioning.
- Antony John Banks, lately Chair, Cameron Price. For services to Engineering in the West Midlands.
- Mark Barber, Planning Director, Radio Advertising Bureau. For services to Commercial Radio.
- Guy Jeffrey Barker, Jazz Trumpeter and Composer. For services to Jazz.
- Ronald Barker. For services to the community in Rossendale, Lancashire.
- Patrick Gerard Barnes, Boxer. For services to Boxing and the community in Northern Ireland.
- Clare Barnfather, Director (Grade 6), Stakeholder and Engagement Team and No 10 Relationship Manager – Marketing, Department for Business Innovation and Skills.
- April Margaret Barrett. For services to Disability Sport.
- Frederick Thomas Barrett, Keeper of the Guard's Chapel. For services to the Army.
- Peter Mervyn Barrett, British Honorary Consul, Lesotho. For services to consular services and assistance to British nationals in Lesotho.
- Wendy Bartlett, Co-founder and Chief Executive, Bartlett Mitchell. For services to the Hospitality Industry.
- Ahmed Bashir, Head, Operations and Finance Business Partner, Marketing, UK Trade and Investment. For services to Equality in the Public Sector.
- Christopher John Bates, Representative of Tristan da Cunha. For services to Tristan da Cunha interests in the UK and worldwide.
- Kenneth Norman Batley. For services to the community in Chalgrove, Oxfordshire.
- Rosemary Margaret Baxter, Fundraiser, Leukaemia and Lymphoma NI. For services to Leukaemia Research.
- Thomas Baxter, Fundraiser, Leukaemia and Lymphoma NI. For services to Leukaemia Research.
- Derek Andrew Bearhop, Head of Games Delivery Team, Scottish Government. For services to Government and the Commonwealth Games.
- Professor Elizabeth Margaret Beaty, Emeritus Professor and lately Pro Vice-'Chancellor, University of Cumbria. For services to Higher Education.
- Dorothy Beeson BEM, Founder, the Swan Sanctuary. For services to the Rescue and Rehabilitation of Swans.
- Ann Bell. For services to the community in Exton, Rutland.
- Squadron Leader Robin Lindsay Blair Bell RAF (rtd.), Project Leader, Palm Tree Associates, Ometepe, Nicaragua. For services to underprivileged people, most recently in Nicaragua.
- Vivienne Bellos, Director of Music, North Western Reform Synagogue. For services to Music.
- Dr. Robert Dean Joseph Berkeley, lately Director, Runnymede Trust. For services to Equality.
- Dr. Pamela Oriri Scholastica Ayewoh-Bernard. For services to the African and Caribbean community in Bedford.
- Irene Janice Beschizza. For services to Young People through Guiding in Hither Green, Bexley and Sidcup, London.
- James Betmead. For services to Sport and the community in Fleetwood, Lancashire through Fleetwood Town Football Club.
- Dr. David Blackburn, Landscape Artist. For services to Art.
- Cynthia Ann Blake, Foster Carer, Hampshire County Council. For services to Children and Families.
- Kenneth Blake, Foster Carer, Hampshire County Council. For services to Children and Families.
- Andrew Richard Blundell, Volunteer, The Duke of Edinburgh Award Scheme, Kent. For services to Young People.
- Patricia Rose Bolton, Founder, Gateshead ADHD Support Group and the Parents in Power Parent-Carer Forum, Gateshead. For services to Children with Disabilities and their Families.
- Deborah Louise Bone, Mental Health Nurse, Hertfordshire Community NHS Trust. For services to Children and Young People.
- Michael Bowden, President, Camborne Agricultural Show and Trade Stand Manager, Royal Cornwall Agricultural Show. For services to Agriculture, Tourism and the community in Cornwall.
- Edward John Bowler, Chair, Crewe Alexandra Football Club. For services to Football.
- James Edward Bowyer, Senior Executive Officer, Ministry of Defence. For services to Defence.
- Dr. Alan Boyle. For services to Swimming and Water Polo.
- Ronald John Bradford. For services to the community in Thorpe on the Hill, Lincolnshire.
- Agnes Barbara Dunlop Brand, Foundation Stage Co-ordinator, Enniskillen Model Primary School. For services to Education and the community in Northern Ireland.
- Margaret Rose Brennand. For services to Girl Guiding and to the community in Skerne and Driffield, East Yorkshire.
- Pastor Gbolahan Ayorinde Bright, Volunteer Maths Teacher, Bright Maths Club, Dagenham Heathway Library. For services to Education in East London.
- Gerard Majella Broderick JP. For services to Justice and to the community in Northern Ireland.
- John Stewart Broomhall, committee member, Nantwich Agricultural Show. For services to Agriculture, the Rural Economy and the community in Nantwich, Cheshire.
- Jennifer Broughton, Founding Member FFLGM, (Families and Friends of Lesbians and Gay Men). For services to Sexual Equality and Families.
- Claire Bruce, Policy Adviser, Cabinet Office. For services to National Security, particularly Destruction of Chemical Weapons.
- Keith Granville Buckler. For services to the New English Orchestra and to Charity through Rotary in Grange-over-Sands, Cumbria.
- Nigel Bumstead, Ministry of Defence. For services to Defence.
- Councillor Janet Burgess, Councillor, London Borough of Islington. For services to Local Government and to the community in Islington.
- Richard George Hugh Burlend, Mechanical Engineer, Ministry of Defence. For services to Defence.
- Allan Robert Burns. For services to disabled people in Scotland and Overseas.
- Professor Janatha Hetherington Burns, Head of School of Psychology, Politics and Sociology, Canterbury Christ Church University. For services to People with an Intellectual Disability.
- Euan Burton, Athlete. For services to Judo.
- Bernard Buxton. For charitable services through the Liverpool Taxi Drivers Children in Care Outing Fund, Merseyside.
- Anthony Byrne. For services to Gymnastics in Northern Ireland.
- Andrew Graham Cameron. For services to Entertainment and Charity in Glasgow.
- Dr. Colin Deas Campbell. For services to the community in Waddesdon, Buckinghamshire.
- Peter Capener, Co-Founder and Chair, Bath and West Community Energy. For services to Sustainable Energy.
- Arthur Capstick. For services to Education and to the community in Staveley and Kendal, Cumbria.
- Lydia Helena Lopez Cardozo, Principal Designer, Cardozo Kindersley Workshop. For services to the Craft of Letter-cutting.
- Philip Carne, Founder, The Richard Carne Charitable Trust. For services to Philanthropy.
- Jack Andrew Carte, Team Leader, UK/Democratic People's Republic of Korea English Teaching and Training Project, Pyongyang. For services to English Language teacher training in the Democratic People's Republic of Korea.
- Ann Carter, Project Director, Imperial War Museums. For services to Museums.
- Bryan Robert Casbourne. For services to the community in Wigmore and Hereford, Herefordshire.
- Dr. Audrey Elizabeth Arlene Cassidy, Chief Executive, Autism NI. For services to People with Autism in Northern Ireland.
- Gladys Yvonne Chamberlain. For services to the community in Axbridge, Somerset.
- Keith George Chapman. For services to Arts and Culture in Hampshire.
- Roma Lynn Charlton, Chief Executive Officer, After Adoption. For services to Children and Families.
- Subhash Chander Chaudhary, Mammalian Cell Culture Venture Leader, Fujifilm Diosynth Biotechnologies. For services to Biotechnology Manufacture in North East England.
- Paul Cheeseman, Employment and Skills Co-ordinator, Great Yarmouth Borough Council. For services to Homeless People.
- Teresa Jane Chinn. For services to Nursing.
- Lynda Clapham, Lead Librarian, Sidney Stringer Academy, Coventry. For services to Education.
- Jennifer Mary Clark, Founder, Sussex Bat Hospital. For services to Bat Conservation in the UK.
- Rochelle Clark, Prop, England Women's Rugby Union Team. For services to Rugby.
- Raymond Coe, Special Educational Needs Co-ordinator, Royal Docks Community School, London Borough of Newham. For services to Education and the community in Newham.
- Gordon Arthur Hector Cole, Master Arrowsmith. For services to Heritage Crafts.
- Ian John Courtney, Chair, Executive Governing Body, Dartmoor Federation. For services to Education.
- Philippa Jane Crabtree, Teacher in Charge of Complementary Therapies, Royal National College for the Blind. For services to the Education of People with Visual Impairments.
- Marion Fenwick Crangle. For services to Foster Care in Renfrewshire.
- Andrea Dawn Crossfield, Chief Executive, Tobacco Free Futures. For services to Public Health and Tobacco Control in the North West.
- Mark Crowther, President, International Nuclear Services, Japan. For services to the British nuclear industry in Japan.
- Joseph Cuddy, lately Border Force Officer, Border Force, Gatwick. For services to Safeguarding of Children and Vulnerable Adults.
- Paul Cummins, Ceramic Artist. For services to Art and First World War Commemorations.
- Patricia Majella Cunningham, Leader, Dominican at Orana Preschool, Newry. For services to Preschool Education in Northern Ireland.
- Paul Cunningham, Ministry of Defence. For services to Defence.
- Denis Curran, Chairman, Loaves and Fishes. For services to Charity and the Homeless in Glasgow.
- Professor Quintin Ivor Cutts, Professor of Computer Science, Education, University of Glasgow. For services to Computing Science.
- Daksha Dabasia, Senior Project Manager, Business Improvement and Compliance Team, Crown Prosecution Service London. For services to Law and Order, particularly Digital Working.
- Christine Mary Davenport. For services to Girlguiding and to the community in Ashford, Middlesex.
- (Margaret) Jean Davidson DL. For services to the community in the City and County of Londonderry.
- Anne Mary Davies DL. For services to the Voluntary and Social Enterprise Sectors throughout Cheshire, especially in Ellesmere Port.
- Dr. Gillian Davies, Specialist in Dental Public Health, Greater Manchester and the Dental Observatory, Public Health England. For services to Dental Public Health.
- Stephen William Davies, Volunteer, RNLI. For services to Maritime Safety.
- Janice Davinson, lately Organiser, Cumbria Federation of Young Farmers Clubs. For services to Farming and Rural Communities in Cumbria.
- Henry William Davis. For charitable and voluntary services in London.
- Eileen Valerie Davison, Lead Scientist, West Midlands. For services to Genomic Technologies.
- Stephen Davison, Higher Executive Officer, Ministry of Defence. For services to Armed Forces Personnel.
- Dr. Robert Anthony Day, Chief Technology Officer, Jisc Technologies and Executive Director, Janet. For services to Information Technology.
- John Arnold Dennis. For services to the community in Barnsley and Grimethorpe, South Yorkshire.
- Ferris Herbert Dennison. For voluntary service to the Northern Ireland Kidney Research Fund.
- Stuart Devine, Operations Director, The Ashvale. For services to the Seafood Industry and Charity.
- Steven Dexter, Evidence Analyst, Department for Transport. For services to Improving Recreational Water Safety.
- Angela Jane Charlotte Dickson, Founder Trustee, the Brain Tumour Charity. For services to Brain Tumour Research and Support.
- Neil Alan Dickson, Chairman of Trustees, the Brain Tumour Charity. For services to Brain Tumour Research and Support.
- George Donaldson. For voluntary service in St. Andrews.
- Rebecca Donnelly, Chief Executive Officer, Fight 4 Change Foundation. For services to Community Sport.
- Sylvia Lesley Donnelly, Higher Officer, Border Force South East and Europe, Home Office. For services to Child Protection and voluntary service in Canterbury.
- Angela Doughty. For services to Children with Special Needs through the Wilby Riding for the Disabled Trust, Northamptonshire.
- Barbara Drummond, Holiday Camps Organiser, Derby Deaf Children's Society. For services to Children with Special Needs and Disabilities in Derbyshire and Lincolnshire.
- (Elizabeth) Lynne Duckworth, lately Director of Advancement, University of Central Lancashire. For services to Higher Education.
- Margaret Forbes Dunbar, lately Chief Executive, St. Columba's Hospice. For services to Palliative Care.
- James Stewart Dunlop. For services to the Stockport Canal Boat Trust and to the community in Disley, Cheshire.
- Geoffrey William James Dunn, Principal, Ballysally Primary School, Coleraine. For services to Education and the community in Northern Ireland.
- Jean Duprez, Senior Manager, K&M McLoughlin Decorating Ltd., and Ambassador, London Chamber of Commerce. For services to Skills Training.
- Heather Duxbury, Primary Headteacher, St. George's International School, Luxembourg. For services to British Education and to the British community in Luxembourg.
- Roy Brian Dyer, Founder, Essex Dog Training Centre and Founding Director, Essex Dog Display Team. For services to Dogs and the community in Essex.
- Ann Eden. For services to Scouting and to the community in Macclesfield, Cheshire.
- Jamal Edwards, Founder and Chief Executive Officer, SBTV. For services to Music.
- Dr. Heather Mary Elgood, Director, Postgraduate Diploma in Asian Arts, School of Oriental and African Studies, University of London. For services to Higher Education and the Arts.
- Councillor Carole Maxwell Ellis, Councillor, Bedford Borough Council. For services to Local Government and Charity. (Deceased: to be dated 2 December 2014.)
- Emma Josephine Elston, Co-founder and Director, UK Container Maintenance Ltd. For services to Manufacturing.
- Professor Barbara Ann English. For services to Heritage and to the community in Beverley, East Riding of Yorkshire.
- Mary Evans, board member, Dyslexia Scotland. For voluntary service to People with Dyslexia in Scotland.
- Margaret Eyden, Border Force, Home Office. For services to Border Safety in the UK, especially Northern Ireland.
- Carol Maud Falconer, President, Durham North County Guide Association. For services to Young People.
- Edward Barry Farwell, Co-Founder and Chief Executive Children's Hospice South West. For services to Children's Palliative Care.
- Alan James Fearon, Member and lately Chorus Master, Chorus of Royal Northern Sinfonia. For services to Music in the North East.
- Diana Kay Fergus, Senior Executive Officer, Affordable Housing Regulation and Investment, Department for Communities and Local Government. For services to Housing.
- Elizabeth McDougall Ferrier, Vice-President, Girlguiding Dunbartonshire. For services to Young People.
- Joseph Charles Fisher. For services to Charity, especially the British Polio Fellowship.
- Jasmine Alexis Flatters, Athletics Volunteer. For services to Triathlon.
- Susan Flohr, Manager, British Dyslexia Association National Helpline and Policy, Berkshire. For services to Dyslexic People.
- Dr. Mary Patricia Flynn, Head of Knowledge Transfer Partnerships and Business Networks, Queen's University Belfast. For services to Higher Education in Northern Ireland.
- Captain Hugh Francis Joseph Fogarty, Volunteer and Chairman, RNLI Staff Association. For services to Flood Rescue and Maritime Safety.
- Christopher Andrew Fonteyn JP. For services to the community in Stourbridge, West Midlands.
- Philippa Mary Ford, Public Affairs and Policy Manager, Chartered Society of Physiotherapy. For services to Physiotherapy.
- Brinsley Forde, Musician and Actor. For services to the Arts.
- Alice Jane Formby, Founding Trustee and Fundraiser, Princess Alice Hospice. For services to End of Life Care.
- Elizabeth Jane Formby, Team Leader, Children's Social Care, Department for Education and Trustee, Akamba Children's Education Fund. For services to Children and to Charity.
- Shirley Rose Davis-Fox, Chair, ISA Training, Bridgend. For services to the Hairdressing Industry.
- Andrew De Freitas. For services to Local Government and the community in North East Lincolnshire.
- Rodney Friend, Violinist. For services to Music.
- Rosalind Fulcher, Prison Officer, H.M. Prison Huntercombe. For services to H.M. Prison Service.
- Lisa Elizabeth Gagliani, lately Chief Executive, Bright Ideas Trust. For services to Young People and Small Business.
- James William Gair, Watch Manager (Retained) Northumberland Fire and Rescue Service. For services to the community in Morpeth, Northumberland.
- Professor Jennifer Elizabeth Gallagher, Professor of Oral Health Strategy, King's College London. For services to Oral Health.
- Ann Louise Avery Gardner, Charity Fundraiser. For services to the community in the British Virgin Islands.
- Caroline Rosemary Gardner JP DL. For services to Charity and to the community in Leyburn, North Yorkshire.
- Elizabeth Ann Garnham, Chair of Governors, Uffculme and Hamilton Special Schools and vice-chair, Parents' Views Count, Birmingham. For services to Education.
- Hazel Margaret Geach. For services to Young People through the Scouting Movement.
- Derek Ernest Gee. For services to Business, Charity and the community in Nottingham.
- David Robert Gerrard. For services to the Scout Movement and to Young People in Cardiff.
- Nicola Gewirtz, Founder, Lola Rose. For services to Jewellery Design.
- Jillian Frances Ghanouni. For voluntary service to the community in Rural India.
- Surinder Kaur Ghura. For services to Interfaith Understanding and to the community in Newcastle upon Tyne.
- Dianne Cynthia Gibbons, Journalist, The Sentinel. For services to Journalism in North Staffordshire.
- Hugh John Simpson Gibson. For political service to the Democratic Unionist Party and to the community in Northern Ireland.
- Professor Patrick Gill, Senior Fellow, Optical Frequency Standards and Metrology, National Physical Laboratory. For services to Science.
- Roisin Goodwin, Research and Development Budget and Compliance Manager, Invest NI. For services to Research and Development.
- Claire Louise Gott, Design Package Manager, WSP UK. For services to Civil Engineering and charitable services in Cameroon.
- Jean Frances Gough. For services to Children and Sport through the Sir Stanley Matthews Foundation in Staffordshire.
- Alison Forbes Graham, First Secretary, Foreign and Commonwealth Office. For services to British foreign policy interests.
- John Thomas Graham. For services to the Langdale Ambleside Mountain Rescue Team, Cumbria.
- Sheila Eileen Elizabeth Graham. For services to victims and witnesses of crime in Northern Ireland.
- Tammie Elizabeth Graham, Administrative Officer, Ministry of Defence. For services to Royal Marines Personnel and Families.
- Dr. Kate Miriam Granger, Trainee Doctor in Elderly Care Medicine, Health Education Yorkshire and the Humber. For services to the NHS and Improving Care.
- John Greener, Foster Carer, Foster Care Associates, Gateshead, Tyne and Wear. For services to Children and Families.
- Linda Greener, Foster Carer, Foster Care Associates, Gateshead, Tyne and Wear. For services to Children and Families.
- William James Greer, Head, Training Organisation, South Eastern Regional College. For services to Education in Northern Ireland.
- Mark Timothy Griffin, Founder and Chief Executive Officer, Play Rugby USA. For services to charitable causes and youth development in the USA.
- Alfred Grummett. For services to Homeless People through Haven Tyneside and to the community in Newcastle upon Tyne and Gateshead, Tyne and Wear.
- George Guest. For charitable services in West London.
- Gordon Stuart Guild. For voluntary political service.
- Dorothy Anne Gunnee. For services to Community Music and Young People in Glasgow.
- Raymond Guy, Practice Manager, Ellergreen Medical Centre, Liverpool. For services to Patient Care.
- John Maddison Hall, Chair of Trustees, Hollybank Trust, West Yorkshire. For services to Children and Adults with Special Needs and Disabilities.
- Professor Susan Hallam, Professor, Emerita, Institute of Education, University of London. For services to Music Education.
- Patrick Hallgate, Route Managing Director, Western, Network Rail. For services to the Economy in the South West.
- Dr. Barbara Hammond, Chief Executive, Low Carbon Hub. For services to Community Energy Development, particularly in Oxfordshire.
- Margaret Carol Ann Hannibal, Director of Operations, MOSAIC. For services to Bereaved Children and their Families in Dorset.
- Maria Hanson. For services to Children and Young People with Life Debilitating Conditions in the Midlands through Me and Dee.
- Helena Teresa Harper, Head of Teacher Development, Education Standards Directorate, Department for Education. For services to Education and to the community in Redbridge.
- Samuel Harris. For services to Recreational Sea Angling.
- Paul Edward Harrison. For services to Law Enforcement and the Public through the Metropolitan Police Service and St. John Ambulance.
- Alan James Harvey. For political service.
- Margaret Ann Hawkes, Foster Carer, Merseyside. For services to Children and Families.
- Derek John Hayward. For services to Sport and Young People in Shropshire.
- Kerry Hearsey, Chief Executive, The Princess Royal Trust for Carers in Hampshire. For services to Carers in Hampshire.
- Deric Armstrong Henderson, lately Editor, Press Association Ireland. For services to Journalism in Northern Ireland.
- Donna Frances Hendry, Team Leader, Dunfermline Station Scottish Ambulance Service. For services to Emergency Healthcare in Fife.
- Professor Martin Anthony Hendry, Head of the School of Physics and Astronomy, University of Glasgow. For services to Public Engagement in Science.
- Professor Katharine Heron, Professor of Architecture, University of Westminster. For services to Architecture and Higher Education.
- William Michael Hewitt, Operations Manager, Rock Lifeboat Station, RNLI. For services to Maritime Safety on the Camel Estuary.
- Frances Ina Hickox, Co-Founder, St. Endellion Music Festival. For services to Music in Cornwall.
- Andrew Patrick Hill. For humanitarian services in the Philippines.
- Norris Albert Hill. For services to the community in Wolverhampton.
- Stephen Hill, Deputy Headteacher, St. Joseph's Roman Catholic Primary School, Shaw, Oldham. For services to Education and Charity.
- The Reverend Dr. Richard Leslie Hills. For services to Industrial Heritage.
- Dr. Virginia Louise Helen Hobday, Doctor. For services to establishing Hospice Care in The Cayman Islands.
- Maryanne Hodgkinson, Head of Arts, Media and Business Administration, Derwen College. For services to Further Education for Adults with Learning Difficulties.
- Matthew Hodson, Consultant Nurse, Homerton Hospital, Homerton University Hospital NHS Foundation Trust. For services to Respiratory Care.
- Dennis Anthony Holland, Higher Executive Officer, Ministry of Defence. For services to Aviation Safety.
- Professor Peter Kenneth Holman, Music Director. For services to Early Music.
- Derek Royston Hopkins, Assistant Chief Officer, Special Constabulary, Essex Police. For services to the community in Essex.
- Helena Marie Hopkins, Head of the Garden Rooms, Prime Minister's Office. For public service.
- Susan Patricia Hopkins, Higher Executive Officer, Stratford Benefit Centre. For services to Customers and charitable services.
- Karen-Marie Horn, Higher Executive Officer, Ministry of Defence. For services to the Armed Forces and Service Families.
- David Malcolm Horsman, Chairman, Mid Yorkshire Chamber of Commerce. For services to Business and the Economy in Yorkshire.
- Keith Richard Hoskins, Hitchin Town Centre Manager. For services to the community in Hitchin.
- Maureen Hudson, Chair, Musgrove Leukaemic Group Somerset, South West. For charitable services to Healthcare.
- David Hughes, Chair, EMI Music Sound Foundation and EMI Archive Trust. For services to the UK Music Industry and Charity.
- Linda Ashbarry Hughes JP. For services to the community in South Devon.
- Alastair Hislop Hume. For services to Fisheries Management and Angling in North East Scotland.
- Tiffany Hunt. For services to Heritage in North West England.
- Sarah Alice Hunter, Vice-Captain, England Women's Rugby Union Team. For services to Rugby.
- Robin Timothy Hutchinson. For services to the Arts and to the community in Surbiton and Kingston upon Thames.
- Professor Elisabeth Ann Innes, Principal Scientist and Director of Communications, Moredun Research Institute. For services to Scientific Research and Communication.
- Paul Shanthakumar Jacob, lately Trustee, Christian Aid. For charitable and voluntary services.
- Sara Delano Jacson. For services to Young People in Shaftesbury and to the community in North Dorset.
- Dr. Stefan Maria Josef Stanislaus Janikiewicz, lately Clinical Director, Drug and Alcohol Services, Cheshire and Wirral Partnership NHS Foundation Trust. For services to Reducing Drug Misuse.
- Melvin Jehu, lately Chair, Cwm Taf Community Health Council. For services to Healthcare and to the community in South Wales.
- John Maurice Arthur Jenkins, President and Chair, SportsAble. For services to Disability Sport.
- Judyth Hilary Jenkins, Head of Nutrition and Dietetic Services, Cardiff and Vale University Health Board. For services to People's Health and Well Being in Wales.
- Sarah Wendy Jewell, Founder and Managing Director, SJA International, and chief executive officer, ALC Health. For services to Entrepreneurship in the Medical Health Industry.
- Elizabeth Caroline Johnson, Business Development Manager, Pure Energy Centre, Unst. For services to Renewable Energy and Charitable Fundraising in Shetland.
- Mark John Johnson, Social Entrepreneur. For services to Vulnerable People through User Voice.
- Brian Jones, lately Foster Carer, Worcestershire. For services to Children and Families.
- David John Jones, Lead Assessor, Parliamentary Assessment Boards, Conservative Party. For political service.
- Jillian Ivy Jones, lately Foster Carer, Worcestershire. For services to Children and Families.
- Dr. Kenneth David Jones, Holiday Camps Organiser, Derby Deaf Children's Society. For services to Children with Special Needs and Disabilities in Derbyshire and Lincolnshire.
- Lawrence Jones, Founder and Chief Executive Officer, UKFast. For services to the Digital Economy.
- Enid Valerie Jourdan, Founder, Action around Bethlehem Children with Disability, Palestinian Territories. For services to improving the lives of disabled children in the West Bank.
- Sonja Le Vay. For services to the community in East Sussex.
- Dr. Rosaleen Mary Llewellyn-Jones. For services to the British Association for Cemeteries in South Asia and to British Indian Studies.
- Dr. Michael John Jubb, Director, Research Information Network (RIN). For services to the Social Sciences.
- Gurmel Singh Kandola, Chief Executive, National Sikh Museum, Derby. For services to the community.
- Dr. Brian Douglas Keighley JP, lately Chair, British Medical Association Scottish Council. For services to Healthcare.
- Jacqueline Kelly, lately Chief Executive, Northern Devon Healthcare NHS Trust. For services to Healthcare.
- Dr. Paul Kerryson, Artistic Director, Curve Theatre. For services to Theatre in Leicestershire.
- Fiona Margaret Keyte. For services to Disadvantaged and Vulnerable People through Time Out in Canterbury, Kent.
- Abdul Razaq Khan, Foster Carer, Slough. For services to Children and Families.
- Surinder Pal Singh Khurana, Volunteer, Humberside Police. For services to the community in North East Lincolnshire.
- Dr. Jean King, lately Director of Tobacco Control, Cancer Research UK. For services to Cancer Prevention.
- Susan Kirk, Former Board Member, Macmillan Cancer Support. For services to Supporting People with Cancer.
- Susan Jane Kirkham, lately Curriculum and Assessment Specialist, Association for School and College Leaders. For services to Education.
- Helen Knights, Administrative Officer, Ministry of Defence. For services in support of Military Operations.
- Jennifer Anne Kretz. For services to North Dorset Home Start and to the community in North Dorset.
- Alva Guy Lambert. For services to the community, particularly the Afro-Caribbean community in Sheffield, South Yorkshire.
- Ann Lampard, Music Teacher. For services to Music Education in Skye and Lochalsh.
- Peter Alan Langard. For services to the Accountancy Profession and to Charity in Birmingham.
- Lieutenant Colonel David Edward Langford. For services to the community in the Isle of Wight.
- Brian Alan Leslie Larcombe, Senior Executive Officer, UK Hydrographic Office. For services to Industrial Relations.
- Susan Leach, Higher Officer, Border Force. For services to Safeguarding Children and Vulnerable Adults.
- Jane Slider Lee, Manager, Consolidated European Reporting System, Maritime and Coastguard Agency. For services to Ship Safety.
- Melvin Kenneth Lee, Senior Project Manager, Jankel Armouring Ltd. For services to the Armed Forces.
- Molly Irene Samuel-Leport. For services to Karate.
- Frank William Letch. For services to People with Disabilities and to the community in Crediton, Devon.
- Gordon Alan Lewis. For services to Young People and to the community in Skelmersdale, West Lancashire.
- Lynda Christine Lewis, lately Editorial Supervisor of the Vote, House of Commons. For parliamentary services.
- Ronald Edward Ley, Councillor, Ilfracombe Town Council. For services to the community in Ilfracombe, Devon.
- Helen Dorothy Lindsay, Staff Officer, Department for Employment and Learning, Northern Ireland Executive. For services to Freedom of Information and voluntary service in Belfast and abroad.
- Stephen Lindsay, lately Chair, Hertfordshire and Bedfordshire Development Committee, The Prince's Trust. For services to Young People.
- Rachel Littlewood. For services to Family Carers through Carers First in Kent and Medway and to People with Learning Disabilities in Gillingham, Kent.
- Professor Carole Margaret Longson, Director, Centre for Health Technology Evaluation, National Institute for Health and Care Excellence. For services to Healthcare.
- Peter Lovell, Chief Executive, North London Credit Union. For services to Access to Finance.
- Robert Sidney Ludditt, Senior Officer, Debt Pursuit, Chesterfield, H.M. Revenue and Customs. For services to Debt Collection.
- Joan Ada Rose Lythgoe, Chair and Holding Trustee, Business Opportunities for the Physically Handicapped. For services to disabled people on Canvey Island.
- Denis Stuart Macgregor. For services to The Boy's Brigade and to the community in Nottingham.
- Alistair John Alexander Maciver. For services to Crofting in the Highlands and Islands.
- Malcolm Dingwall Mackay. For services to Football in Glasgow.
- Gary Maguire, Manager, Cultural Services Team, Glasgow City Council. For services to the community in South West Glasgow.
- Carol Betsy Lees Dickson Main, Director, Live Music Now Scotland. For services to Music.
- Florence Mairs, Principal, Straid Primary School, Ballyclare. For services to Education and the community in County Antrim.
- David John Major, Regional Corporate Services Director, Central Europe Network, Foreign and Commonwealth Office. For services to British interests in Central Europe.
- Mary Elizabeth Male, Non-Executive Chair, TrustMark. For services to the Construction Industry and Consumer Protection.
- Pauline Veronica Manley, lately Project Manager, Women Making a Difference. For services to Empowering Women and Under-'represented Groups.
- Rabbi Barry Marcus. For services to Holocaust Education.
- Nicola Mark, Head of Norfolk Pension Fund, Norfolk County Council. For services to Local Government.
- David Timothy Marsh. Offender Outcomes Manager, H.M. Prison Barlinnie. For services to Training and Improvements.
- Margaret Isobel Marten. For services to the community in Chandlers Ford and to Winchester Prison Visitors' Tea Bar in Hampshire.
- David Martin, Operations Manager, Broughty Ferry and Peterhead Lifeboat Stations, RNLI. For services to Maritime Safety.
- Deborah Martyr, Programme Manager and Tiger Conservationist, Kerinci Seblat National Park and Fauna & Flora International. For services to Tiger Conservation.
- Atul Maru, Executive Officer, Border Force, Heathrow Airport, Home Office. For services to Law Enforcement.
- Jennifer Lynne McAllister, Education Officer, Scottish Seabird Centre. For services to Education.
- Alistair McArthur. For services to Humanitarian Aid.
- Beatrice Helen McBride, lately Director of Policy and Communications, British Heart Foundation. For services to cardiovascular healthcare.
- Celine McCartan, Deputy Director (Head of Corporate and Support Services) South West College. For services to Further Education in Northern Ireland.
- Pamela Joan McConnell. For services to the community in Chesterfield, Derbyshire and to Charity through the Association of Inner Wheel Clubs in Great Britain and Ireland.
- The Reverend Ronald McCracken. For Humanitarian services to Children and Young Adults Overseas.
- Brendan Joseph McCusker, Principal, St. Mary's Primary School, Maguiresbridge. For services to Education in Northern Ireland.
- Winston Anthony McDowell, Bank Staff Nurse, Broadmoor Hospital, West London Mental Health NHS Trust. For services to Mental Health.
- Florence Carole McFadden, Programme Manager, British Council. For services to British performing arts and promoting diversity overseas.
- Lesley Anne McIntosh, Asset Management Director, EA Technology and Founder and managing director, EA Technology Analytical Limited. For services to Manufacturing.
- David McKenzie. For services to Young People in the North East.
- Diane Jane McLafferty, Deputy Director, Commonwealth Games, Scottish Government. For services to Government and the Commonwealth Games.
- Councillor John McLaughlin, Member, Omagh District Council. For services to Local Government and to the community in Omagh, County Tyrone.
- Julie Ann McLean, Director, Work Based Learning and School Partnerships, City College Plymouth. For services to Education.
- Anne MacGregor McPherson. For services to Nursing.
- Margaret Vera Mead, lately Chairman, Croydon Health and Wellbeing Board, and Founder, Croydon Carers Support Centre. For Civic and Community Services.
- Geoffrey Reginald Meade, Journalist. For services to the British community in Belgium.
- Kathy Jane Mellor, Neonatal Nurse Practitioner, Family Care, and Founder, Birthlink. For services to neonatal nursing and charitable work to improve the survival of newborn babies in developing countries.
- Catherine Mary Meredith, Herefordshire Rural Hub Co-ordinator. For services to Rural Communities.
- Catherine Flint Millar, Secretary, The Burghead Headland Trust. For services to the community in Burghead, Morayshire.
- Alderman Maurice Turtle Mills, Member, Ballymena Borough Council. For services to Local Government.
- David Stuart Millward. For voluntary service to the Fire and Rescue Service in Argyll.
- Judith Kay Miln, Deputy Headteacher, Clapton Girls' Academy, Hackney. For services to Education.
- Claire Milne, Partner, Antelope Consulting. For services to the Telecommunications Sector.
- Margaret Rose-Whyte-Linton Mitchell, Stroke Liaison Team Leader, Westgate Health Centre. For services to Healthcare in Tayside.
- Doreen Jaen-Mooney, Community Worker, New Heights, Kingstanding. For services to the community in Birmingham.
- Jillian Margot Moore. For services to the community, particularly Children in Sheffield, South Yorkshire.
- Jennifer Ann Morgan, Senior Manager, Woodlands High Special School Cardiff. For services to Special Education and the community in Cardiff.
- Richard Moross, Chief Executive Officer and Founder, Moo.com. For services to Entrepreneurship.
- Valerie Anne Morris, President, Birmingham Branch and Divisional Vice-President, NSPCC. For services to Children.
- Dr. Patrick Alfred Morris, Volunteer, National Trust. For services to the Natural and Historic Environment.
- Marion Eleanor Morse. For services to the community in Norwich, Norfolk.
- Dr. Caron Morton, Accountable Officer, Clinical Commissioning Group, Shropshire. For services to Primary Care.
- Joyce Mouriki, Chair, Voices of Experience. For services to Mental Healthcare.
- Ellen Muir, Headteacher, Pilrig Park School, Edinburgh. For services to Education.
- Jean Mulford. For services to the community in St. Helens, Merseyside.
- Mary Lou Lockhart-Mummery, Founder Member, Independent Monitoring Board, Heathrow Airport. For services to Prisoners and Detainees.
- Bridget Bernadette Murphy, Volunteer, Samaritans, Bedford. For services to Vulnerable People.
- Alma Joan Murray, Vice-President, North Yorkshire, Royal British Legion Women's Section. For voluntary service to Service Personnel and Veterans.
- Maureen Murray, lately Programme Manager, the Children's Society, Solihull. For services to Disabled Children and their Families.
- Professor Nanette Mutrie, Chair, Physical Activity for Health, University of Edinburgh. For services to Physical Activity and Health in Schools.
- Annemarie Naylor. For services to Community Asset Ownership.
- Margaret Anne Mckinnon Neal, Secretary, Scotland Branch, Commonwealth Parliamentary Association. For services to the Scottish Parliament and International Relations.
- Dr. Alastair Lockington Noble. For services to Health, Social Care and Conservation in Nairnshire.
- Terrance Noel, Founder, Melodians Steel Orchestra. For services to Music.
- Deirdre Nutt, Chair, Dartmouth Caring. For services to Older People.
- Geoffrey Ogden, Volunteer, Humberside Police. For services to the community in the East Riding of Yorkshire.
- Mairi Christine O'Keefe, Chief Executive Officer, Leuchie House. For services to People with Disabilities.
- Katherine Elizabeth O'Neil. For services to Girlguiding.
- Elizabeth Ann Ottaway, Nurse, Nhkata Bay, Malawi. For services to improving health and education in Africa.
- Anne Owen, Founder, North Clwyd Animal Rescue Centre. For services to Animal Health and Welfare in North Wales.
- Marion Ruth Oxley. For services to the community in St. Albans and Wheathampstead, Hertfordshire.
- Albert Herbert Percy Palmer, Honorary Secretary, Chartered Institution of Civil Engineering Surveyors. For services to Construction.
- Andrew Edward Panter DL. For services to charity and to the community in Berkshire.
- Stephen Royston Parsons. For services to Education and the community in Bristol.
- Vanita Parti, Founder, Blink Brow Bar. For services to the Beauty Industry and to Street Children in India through Butterflies.
- Nicola Jean Passaportis, Welfare Co-ordinator, Zimbabwe. For services to ex-service men, women and widows in Zimbabwe.
- Ushma Patel, Diary Secretary, Department for Communities and Local Government. For services to Public Administration and to the community through the Dharmaj Society of London.
- Eleanor Margaret Paterson, Community Reparation Officer, Surrey Youth Justice. For services to Restorative Justice.
- Keith Russell Paterson. For services to Promoting Information Technology to Elderly People in the UK.
- William Patterson, Chair, Board of Governors, Dromore Central Primary and Dromore High Schools. For services to Education in Northern Ireland.
- Terry Pattinson, Senior Officer, National Crime Agency. For services to Law Enforcement in the Field of Kidnap and Extortion.
- Gerard Hilary Penfold, Performance Manager, Debt Management and Banking, London, H.M. Revenue and Customs. For services to Debt Collection.
- Roger Percival. For charitable services through Harrogate Rotary Club, North Yorkshire.
- Dr. Stephen Roger Perrin. For services to the Cinema Industry.
- Nicolette Elizabeth Perry. For services to Further Education and Training.
- Robert Gavin Pettigrew. For services to Mountaineering.
- Graeme James Phillips, Artistic Director, Unity Theatre. For services to the Arts in Liverpool.
- Jonathan Robert Pickles, Bradford Community Safety Inspector, West Yorkshire Police. For services to Policing and the community in Bradford.
- Ronald Vincent Pilkington, Group Scout Leader, 17th South West Leeds Scout Group. For services to Young People.
- Tom Piper, Theatre Designer. For services to Theatre and First World War Commemorations.
- Alexander James Pirie. For voluntary service in Livingston, West Lothian.
- Julian Martin Leigh-Pollitt. For services to the Steyning Area First Responders Group and to the community in Steyning, West Sussex.
- Marguerite Porter, Director, Yorkshire Ballet Summer School. For services to Ballet.
- Eric Powell. For services to Football and Charity.
- Katherine Mary Powley, County Network Coordinator and Streetworks Manager, Oxfordshire County Council. For services to the community in Oxfordshire.
- Councillor Francis Prendergast, Lord Mayor and Councillor, Liverpool City Council. For services to Local Government and to the community in Liverpool.
- Linvoy Stephen Primus. For services to Football and Charity in Portsmouth.
- Barrie Christopher Quinn, Officer, Personal Tax Operations Complaint Handler, H.M. Revenue and Customs. For services to Customers and voluntary service in Newcastle.
- Jennifer Margaret Rafferty, Research Accounts Manager, University of Kent. For services to Higher Education.
- Gail Ramsden, Senior Officer, IT Skills and Capability Manager, Valuation Office Agency. For services to Young People through the ICT Apprentice Scheme.
- Professor Richard Thomas Ramsden, lately Professor of Otolaryngology, Manchester Royal Infirmary and Honorary Professor, University of Manchester. For services to Otolaryngology.
- Carolyn Mary Randall, Area Manager, Crimestoppers Trust, Sussex. For services to Crime Prevention.
- Mohammad Aslam Rashud, Headteacher, John Summers High School, Flintshire. For services to Education in Wales.
- Nicolae Christopher Ratiu, Ratiu Family Foundation. For services to disadvantaged groups in Romania.
- Miguel Fragoso-Recio, lately Managing Director, Millbrook Proving Ground. For services to the UK Automotive Industry.
- John Peter Reece, Chair, Reece Group Ltd. For services to Engineering, Manufacturing and Innovation.
- David Robin Reeks, Volunteer, Edinburgh Direct Aid. For services to humanitarian aid to people afflicted in war in Bosnia, Croatia, Albania, Kosovo and the Palestinian Territories.
- Laila Remtulla, Managing Director, Laila's Fine Foods Ltd. For services to the Food and Drink Business.
- Kenneth Christopher Richards, Volunteer Coastguard, Port Isaac Coastguard Rescue Team. For services to Maritime Safety.
- Thomas Ridyard, Chairman, Bolton and District Branch, RNLI. For charitable services.
- Rene Fordyce Rigby, Development Officer, Scottish Care. For services to Mental Health Nursing.
- George Ritchie, lately Senior Vice-President, Sembcorp UK. For services to Apprenticeships in the Chemical and Process Industries.
- Anthony Bawden Robinson. For services to Mountain Rescue and to the community in Coniston, Cumbria.
- David John Robinson, Chief Executive Officer, PD Ports. For services to International Trade and the UK Economy.
- Fiona Marshall Robinson, Administrative Officer, Ministry of Defence. For services to the Army.
- Carol Rogers, Executive Director, Education and Visitors, National Museums Liverpool and Project Leader, House of Memories. For services to Museums.
- Celia Romain, Higher Executive Officer, Apprenticeships Unit, Department for Business, Innovation and Skills. For services to Public Administration.
- Kenneth Ian Ross DL. For public and voluntary service in High Wycombe, Buckinghamshire.
- Lynda Rowbotham, Head of Legal Advice, Royal Mencap Society. For services to people with Learning Disabilities and their Families.
- Anita Ruckledge, Lead Nurse for Dementia, The Mid Yorkshire Hospitals NHS Trust. For services to Nursing.
- Barry Michael Russell, Flood Risk Management Specialist, Environment Agency. For services to Flood Risk Management.
- Margaret Jean Rutledge, lately Strategic Lead for Catering and Cleanliness, Aneurin Bevan Health Board. For services to Catering and Nutrition in the NHS in South East Wales.
- Carolyn Mary, Countess de Salis, Chairman, Overlord Embroidery Trust. For services to Needlework and to Charity in Somerset.
- Professor John Joseph Scarisbrick, Founder, Baby Hospice and LIFE Fertility Care Programme, Warwickshire. For services to Vulnerable People.
- Anthony John Scott, Chief Examiner and Principal Moderator for GCSE Physical Education, Edexcel Exam Board. For services to Education.
- Carol Scott, Senior Executive Officer, Ministry of Defence. For services in support of Military Operations.
- Hugh Noel Aliceston Scudder, Director, Christian Response. For services to improving the lives of vulnerable communities in the Republic of Moldova.
- Zubeda Seedat, Policy Officer, Public Health, Department for Health. For services to Public Health.
- Alan Charles Sefton, Head, Arsenal in the Community. For services to Education and to Young People in the UK and Abroad.
- Fiona Margaret Sellar, Principal Music Teacher, Nairn Academy. For services to Education, Music and Charity in Nairn.
- Sheila Lesley Selwood, lately Director of Governance, West Herts College and Member, Association of College Governors Council. For services to Further Education.
- Heather Shepherd, Community and Flood Recovery Support, National Flood Forum. For services to the community, particularly those at Risk of Flooding.
- Geoffrey John Shore. For services to Business and the voluntary sector in Bristol.
- Sandra Simmons, Chair of Governors, Kilgarth School, Merseyside. For services to Education.
- Bryony Simpson, Chair, Royal College of Speech and Language Therapist. For services to Speech and Language.
- Sylvia Ruth Simpson. For services to the communities in Newlyn and Penzance, West Cornwall.
- Alison Jean Katherine Skene DL. For public service in Aberdeen.
- Wendy Sly. For services to Athletics.
- Ann-Marie Smale. For services to Education and Training in the Construction Sector in Wales.
- Sister Delia Marie Smith, Director of Proyecto Vida, Coatepeque, Guatemala. For services to the people with HIV/AIDS in Guatemala.
- Janet Smith, Principal, Northern School of Contemporary Dance. For services to Dance.
- Judith Mary Smith, Macmillan Nurse Consultant, Cancer and Palliative Care, Borders General Hospital. For services to Oncology in the Scottish Borders.
- Luana Wai Wai Smith. For services to the community in Hull, particularly the Chinese community.
- Peter Alan Smith, Project Coordinator, Tour de France, Leeds City Council. For services to Sports Development in Leeds and the Tour de France Grand D‚part.
- Ralph Antony Smith, Lawyer, Madrid. For services to the British Embassy and to the British community in Spain.
- Sally Ann Smith, Honorary Secretary, Conservative Agents Benevolent Fund. For political service.
- Andrew Lorrain Smith, lately Justice of the Peace. For public service in Lothian and Borders.
- Myra Mary Speirs, lately Member, Renfrewshire Children's Panel Advisory Committee. For services to the Children's Hearings System in Scotland.
- John Stewart Spence, Proprietor, Marcliffe Hotel, Pitfodels. For services to the Tourism Industry in Scotland.
- Jean Lillian Elizabeth Steer. For services to Age Concern and the community in Epsom and Ewell, Surrey.
- Dr. Jay Stewart, Co-founder and Director, Gendered Intelligence. For services to the Transgender community.
- Olive Joan Stoker. For services to the community in Birmingham, West Midlands.
- Lesley Strathie, Executive Officer, Finance Group, Department for Work and Pensions. For services to Public Administration and to Young People in North Yorkshire through Girlguiding.
- Nigel Morris Stratton. For services to the community in Tunbridge Wells, Kent.
- Charles Albert Stripp, Chief Executive, Mathematics in Education and Industry. For services to Education.
- Mizan Rahman Syed. For services to Government Digital Communication.
- Jeffrey John Taylor, First Secretary, Foreign and Commonwealth Office. For services to British foreign policy interests.
- Dr. Wendy Barbara Taylor, Councillor, Newcastle City Council. For public and political service in the North East.
- Kim Alison Tester, HR Manager, Wales Office. For services to the Public Sector and the community in Cardiff and Overseas.
- Janet Thethi, Divisional Vice-President, North East NSPCC. For services to Children.
- Anne Marsden Thomas, Head, Royal College of Organists Academy Organ School. For services to Organ Music.
- Michael Thomas Till, Operations Manager, Carbon Capture Pilot Plant, Ferrybridge. For services to the Energy Sector and to the community in Castleford.
- Dr. David Farquharson Troup, General Practitioner, Arrochar Surgery. For services to Healthcare in Argyll and Bute.
- Margaret Ann Tullett, lately Executive Officer, Strategy Disability Directorate. For services to People with Disabilities.
- Mary Greig Tulloch. For services to the community in Kinghorn, Fife.
- Robert James Twitchin, lately Chair, IT Can Help. For services to the Telecommunications Industry and People with Disabilities.
- Edwina Louise Tyler, Business and Community Engagement Manager, H.M. Prison The Mount, H.M. Prison Service. For services to Prisoners and Prison Volunteering.
- Sally Jane Tyler, Children's Epilepsy Specialist Nurse, Norfolk Community Health and Care NHS Trust. For services to Nursing.
- Imam Mohammed Kabir Uddin, Imam, H.M. Prison Wormwood Scrubs. For services to H.M. Prison Service.
- Jeffrey Utley, Committee Member, Institution of Engineering and Technology. For services to Engineering in Yorkshire.
- Joan Walker. For services to the community in Stony Stratford and Milton Keynes, Buckinghamshire.
- Robert Walker, lately Higher Officer, Border Force. For services to Border Security.
- Vincent Henry Walker, Prison Consultant, H.M. Prison Anguilla. For services to Anguilla and the UK Government.
- David John Waller. For services to Business and to the community in the West Midlands.
- Andrew Wallis, Curator – The Guards Museum. For services to the Commemoration of National Heritage and Charity.
- Kathrin Louise Richardson-Walsh, Captain – England and Great Britain Women's Hockey Teams. For services to Hockey.
- Alan Martin Walters. For services to the community in Beaconsfield, Buckinghamshire.
- Eunice Walters, Headteacher, Brynhyfryd Primary School, Briton Ferry. For services to Education and Young People in Neath Port Talbot.
- Judith Ann Walters, International Adviser, Girlguiding Ceredigion. For services to Young People.
- Janet Ivy Warin. For services to the Drive Alive Awareness Project and to the community in Pickering, North Yorkshire.
- Nigel George Warner. For services to the International Movement for Lesbian and Gay Rights.
- James Frame Warnock, Farmer, Sandilands Farm, Lanark. For services to Education and Agriculture in Scotland.
- Shaa Wasmund, Founder, Smarta. For services to Business and Entrepreneurship.
- Timothy John Henry Webber, Chair and Managing Director, Barnfield Group. For services to Business and the community in Lancashire.
- Dorothy Ann Weedon. For political service, particularly in Maidstone, Kent.
- Christopher Hayward Wells, Chair of Governors, Federated Schools of Gislingham and Palgrave, Suffolk. For services to Education.
- Colin William George Weston JP. For services to the Magistracy and to the Police Authority in Dorset.
- Christopher Westwood. For charitable services through the Chris Westwood Charity for Children with Physical Disabilities in the West Midlands.
- Michael James Whatton, Afghan Multi Activity Contract Manager, KBR UK. For services to the Armed Forces.
- Linda Barbara Wheeler, Senior Officer, Advisory Team, Bootle, H.M. Revenue and Customs. For services to Tax Collection and voluntary service to Education in Liverpool.
- Albert Whiting. For services to the community in North Tyneside and to charitable services in the UK and Abroad.
- Dawn Elizabeth Wiggins, Personal Secretary and Secretarial Head of Profession, Ministry of Defence. For services to Defence.
- Joyce Wiggins. For services to Girlguiding in Lancashire Borders.
- Susan Mary Wigglesworth. For services to the community in Polstead, Essex and South Suffolk.
- Sharon Elizabeth Willett, Customer Service Assistant, Newark Station. For services to Rail Passengers.
- Beverley Anne Williams, Founder, Social Worker of the Year Awards. For services to the Social Work Profession in England.
- Margaret Williams. For services to the Anglican Diocese of Bristol and to the community in Swindon, Wiltshire.
- Dr. Michael Vaughan Williams, Former Eminent Consultant Oncologist, Addenbrookes Hospital, Cambridge. For services to Oncology.
- Dr. Jane Rata Williamson. For services to the community, particularly Young People in South Cambridgeshire.
- Janette Williamson, Leader, 1st Chandlers Ford Guide Unit. For services to Young People.
- Emma Catherine Ramsay Willis, Founder and Owner, Emma Willis Ltd. For services to Entrepreneurship.
- Bryce Sutherland Wilson, Historian. For services to Culture in the Orkney Isles.
- Eleanor Wilson, Director, Outreach and Community Engagement, Glasgow Caledonian University. For services to Community Education in Glasgow.
- John Michael Wilson. For services to the community in Kingstanding, Birmingham.
- Maureen Wilson, Chair, Skegness Group of Friends. For charitable services to Cancer Care.
- Michael William Wilson. For services to the community in Eaton and Rushton, Cheshire.
- Peter John Winchester. For services to Swimming and to charity in Grimsby, North Lincolnshire.
- Rosemary Anne Winnall, Volunteer, Wyre Forest. For services to the Natural Environment.
- Deborah Jane Withers, lately Headteacher, Wren Spinney Special School Kettering. For services to Education.
- Mark James Wood, British Skeleton Coach. For services to coaching the British Skeleton team.
- Pearl Marion Woodburn, lately Principal of Strathfoyle Nursery School. For services to Primary Education and to the community in County Londonderry.
- John William Woodfield, First Secretary, Foreign and Commonwealth Office. For services to British foreign policy interests.
- John Woolf, Music Director and lately Head of Music, The Royal Shakespeare Company. For services to Music in the Theatre.
- Brian Spencer Worthington. For services to the Arts and to the community in Knebworth, Hertfordshire.
- Nicholas John Wright, Chairman, J. S. Wright & Sons Ltd. For services to the Manufacturing Industry.
- Christine Yau, Founder and Proprietor, Yming Restaurant. For services to the Hospitality Industry.
- Muhammad Zahur. For services to the Pakistani community in Sheffield.
- Lindsay Ann Ziehl, Manager, Shelter for Victims of Domestic Abuse, Port Elizabeth, South Africa. For services to vulnerable women and children in South Africa.

=== British Empire Medal (BEM) ===
- Margaret Mary Alford – For services to the community in Ashington, West Sussex.
- Sarah Allan – Honorary Secretary, Malden Golf Club Sub-'Committee. For services to Golf and Charity.
- Valerie Margaret Allen – For voluntary service to Rider and Equine Safety.
- Margaret Mary Amrar – lately Postmistress, Dyffryn Cellwen Post Office. For services to the Post Office and the Community.
- Jack Andow – Fundraiser, Royal Naval Association. For voluntary service to Royal Navy Veterans.
- Councillor James Gregory Andrews – Deputy Leader, Barnsley Metropolitan Council and chairman, South Yorkshire Fire and Rescue Authority. For services to Local Government.
- Marian Jean Andrews – For services to the community in Saxmundham, Suffolk.
- Nigel Paul Anstead – For services to Charity and to the community in Bedford.
- Susan Anstead – For services to Charity and to the community in Bedford.
- Audrey Jean Apperley – For services to Children and Young People in Tillington, Herefordshire.
- Paul William Armishaw – For services to the community in Uffington, Oxfordshire.
- John Stuart Atkinson – Rugby Volunteer. For services to Rugby in Hertfordshire.
- Dr. Leslie Atkinson – For services to the community in Manuden, Essex.
- Mark Harry Audley – Chair, White City Residents' Association. For services to the community in London.
- John Arthur Ayers – Special Constable, Metropolitan Police Service. For services to Community Policing.
- Rebecca Mary Roberta Baldwin – Co-founder, Women's Network, Department for Energy and Climate Change. For services to Gender Equality in the Workplace.
- Edward John Barker – For voluntary service to the community in Colwyn Bay, Conwy.
- Virginia Anne Barnacle – For services to Brighton Sailing Club and Brighton Surf Life Saving Club and to the community in Brighton, East Sussex.
- Anne Barratt – For services to Young People in Dunkeswell.
- James Barrow – For services to Hockey.
- Arthur John Biggs – Chair, Whitemoss Club for Young People. For services to the community in North Manchester.
- Howard Jeffrey Blatch – Food Services Manager, Multinational Force and Observers, Sinai, Egypt. For services to British servicemen as an international peacekeeper.
- Maureen Murrel Bond – For services to the Dereham Road and Chapel Fields Luncheon Clubs and the community in Swardeston, Norfolk.
- Barbara Jane Bonsor – For services to Young People in Lincolnshire.
- Bertram Frank Bonsor – For services to Young People in Lincolnshire.
- Michael David Booth – Parish Councillor, Sutton Bridge Parish Council. For services to the community.
- Franklin Christopher Boucher TD – Volunteer, Royal National Institute of Blind People, London and South East England. For services to the Blind and Partially Sighted.
- Colin Anthony Bowen – For services to Young People in Handsworth, Birmingham.
- Ruth Boyes – For services to the Pets As Therapy charity in North Yorkshire.
- Hazel Wendy Bradburn – For voluntary and charitable services to the community in Bolton.
- Eleanor Mary Ingram Bremner – Volunteer, Macmillan Cancer Support. For services to Charity in Glasgow.
- Liam Denis Broderick – For services to the community in Northern Ireland.
- Kenneth Frederick Brooke – For services to Charity and to the community in Leconfield, East Riding of Yorkshire.
- Joseph Kay Brown – For services to Community Sport in Trafford.
- June Ellen Brown – For services to the community in Bickington and Hennock, Devon.
- Patricia Anne Burns – Staff Governor, Appleby Grammar School, Cumbria. For services to Education.
- Shirley Callaghan – Manager and Head Coach, Ladywell Gymnastics Club. For services to Gymnastics.
- Emma Callan Counsellor – Waymark Counselling Trust and Arcadia Counselling Service. For services to the community in Canterbury and Herne Bay, Kent.
- Lesley Calvert – Manager, Funfishers Out of School Club and Playgroup, York. For services to Education.
- Peter John Camp – For services to the community in Alverstoke, Hampshire.
- Jane Campbell – For services to the community in Cullompton, particularly the Walronds Trust.
- Michael Thomas Campbell – For services to Charitable Fundraising.
- Patricia Lyn Carey – lately Health Care Assistant, Royal Glamorgan Hospital, Rhondda Cynon Taff. For services to the NHS.
- Karyl Carter – Stroke Association Co-ordinator, Bridgend. For services to Stroke Survivors.
- Valerie Margaret Chadwick – For services to the Rochdale Festival Choir and to the community in Rochdale.
- David Andrew Chaffey – ICT Operator, Aneurin Bevan University Health Board. For services to the NHS and for voluntary and charitable services.
- Ann Chalmers – President, Renfrew Division, Girls' Brigade Scotland. For services to the Girls' Brigade and voluntary service in Johnstone, Renfrewshire.
- Leonora Margaret Chiddicks – Office Manager, Office of the Parliamentary Security Director, House of Commons. For parliamentary service.
- Marion Clark – For services to the community in Felton and Thirston, Northumberland.
- Andrew Cornett Clint – Chairman, Armagh Police Voluntary Welfare Group. For services to the community in Armagh.
- Raymond Walter Cole – For services to the community in Letchworth, Hertfordshire.
- Robert Arthur Coles – Fleet Manager, Gloucestershire Fire and Rescue Service. For services to the Fire and Rescue Service and to the community.
- Donald Collins – Operations Field Team Leader, Environment Agency. For services to the community in Worcestershire.
- Maureen Kathleen Collins – Manager, New Park Day Centre, Islington. For services to the Care of Older People.
- Theresa Condick – Pupil Support Manager, Glyn Derw High School, Cardiff. For services to Education and to the community in Ely and Caerau, Cardiff.
- Joanna Jane Lankester Copsey – Town Pastor Volunteer. For services to Policing and Community Safety in Bury St. Edmunds, Suffolk.
- Margaret Mary Couchman – For services to the community in Belfast.
- Clive Cowell – For services to the community in Allerton Bywater, West Yorkshire.
- John Cowking – For services to Music in the Hodder Valley, Lancashire.
- Ronald Victor Cox – For services to Education and to the community in Holt and Kelsing, Norfolk.
- Simon James Cox – Head of Information Technology, Arab Insurance Group, Bahrain. For services to charitable interests in Bahrain.
- Peter Trevor Craddock – Founder, Havant Symphony Orchestra and Havant Chamber Orchestra. For services to Music.
- Ellison Elizabeth Craig – Chair, Stranmillis Residents' Association. For services to the community in Belfast.
- Lisa Crowley – Personal Assistant, Ministry of Defence. For services to Defence and for community service, particularly to Young People.
- Lance Serdiville Cruse – Border Force Officer, Maritime Targeting, Border Force, Felixstowe, Home Office. For services to the Protection of Endangered Species.
- Tracy Catherine Cullen – Business Manager, Queensbridge Primary School, London Borough of Hackney. For services to Education.
- David Curtis – For voluntary and charitable services to the community in Caerphilly.
- Graham Keith Dark – For services to the community in Spalding, Lincolnshire.
- June Davey – Volunteer Room Steward and Tour Guide, Clandon Park. For services to Heritage in Surrey.
- Janet Mary Davies – For services to the community in Great Totham, Essex.
- John Edward Davies – For services to Cricket in Bishops Cannings and to the community in Devizes, Wiltshire.
- Sheila Elizabeth Davies – School Crossing Patrol, Ysgol Y Traeth, Barmouth. For services to the community in Barmouth, Gwynedd.
- Rachael Davison – Centre Manager, Walkway Community Association. For services to the community in East Belfast, Northern Ireland.
- John Harvey Deane – For services to the community in Dudley, West Midlands.
- Robert Arthur Denton – For services to the community in Rothwell, Northamptonshire.
- Margaret Devaney – For voluntary service in Dunbartonshire.
- William Dickson – For services to the community in Northern Ireland.
- Elaine Mary Dixon – lately Day Nursery general manager, University of Essex. For services to Higher Education and charitable fundraising.
- Patricia Anne Dobbin – For services to the Riding for the Disabled Association, Hampshire and Surrey Borders.
- Jane Doherty – Manager, Ashford Family Nursery, Kent. For services to Children and Families.
- Henry Scott Douglas – For services to the community in Bonchester, Scottish Borders.
- Margaret Dykes – For services to Charity and to the community in Chalfont St. Giles, Buckinghamshire.
- Dr. Elizabeth Anne Edwards – Research Scientist, John Innes Centre and Volunteer, Norfolk Wildlife Trust. For services to the Environment and the Public Understanding of Science.
- Dorothy Muir Ellis – Volunteer, Save the Children. For charitable services.
- John Geraint Evans – Conductor and Musical Director, Aber Valley Male Voice Choir, Senghenydd. For services to Music and for charitable services.
- Paul William Evans – Curator, Internal Fire Museum of Power, Tanygroes, Ceredigion. For services to the Preservation and Promotion of British Industrial Heritage and Tourism.
- Rita Evans – For voluntary service to the community in Caerphilly.
- Melvyn Leslie Farrell – Clerk to the Parliament. For public service in Gibraltar.
- Douglas Faulconbridge – Parcel Hub Operative, Parcelforce Worldwide. For services to Royal Mail and the community.
- Mary-Rose Fawkes – For services to the community in Worcester.
- Tessa Eve Fineman – For services to the Arts in Ashford, Kent.
- Alexander James Firth – For voluntary service in Orkney.
- Elena Foley – For services to the community in Castleton, Lancashire.
- Raymond John Foster – Asset Performance Team Leader, Environment Agency. For services to the Environment and Flood Risk Management.
- Gillian Cecily Fowler – For services to the community, particularly the League of Friends of the Queen Victoria Memorial Hospital in Herne Bay, Kent.
- Ann Garner – Artistic Director, The Mission Theatre. For services to Theatre in Bath.
- Patricia Ann Gates – Secretary, National Association of Retired Police Officers, Bristol. For services to Policing.
- Doreen Patricia Gibbings – For services to the community in Shipton Moyne, Gloucestershire.
- Eleanor Mary Jane Gilbert – For services to the community in Great Ness and Little Ness, Shropshire.
- Sandra Gilbert – For services to the community in Chiddingfold and Haslemere, Surrey.
- Valerie Gill – For services to the community in Slyne and Hest Bank, Lancashire.
- Sylvia Gilson – For services to the Chulmleigh Old Fair, Devon.
- Anna Margaret Glass – For voluntary service to Ardstraw Parish Church and the community in Newtownstewart.
- Flora Glekin – For charitable services in Glasgow.
- Angela Catherine Warneken Gold – For services to Osteoporosis Research through the Osprey Charity and to the community in Hull, East Yorkshire.
- Judith Alison Goodall – For services to the community in Chilton, Oxfordshire.
- Judith Jean Gowen – For services to the Aldeburgh Carnival and to the community in East Suffolk.
- Robert Graham – Missionary, Belfast City Mission. For voluntary service to the community in Northern Ireland.
- Anne Helen Grant – Founder and lately chairman, Save the Children Ayr Branch Art Exhibition.
- Councillor Josephine Mary Graves – Councillor, Chipping Norton Town Council. For services to the community.
- Hilda Green – For services to the community in Wheatley Hills, Doncaster.
- Mary Greenlaw – Cleaner, Portsoy Primary School. For services to Education and to Charity in Banffshire. (Deceased. To be dated 2 December 2014.)
- Jean Eileen Greenwood – Lead Volunteer, Rushcliffe Neighbourhood Policing Team, Nottinghamshire Police. For services to the local community.
- Louise Sarah Ruth Greer – For services to Riding for the Disabled in Coleraine and Meningitis UK.
- Lance Gregg – Messenger, Department for International Development. For services to Public Administration.
- Jessica Gloria Gripton – For services to Sport in Cradley Heath, West Midlands.
- Margaret Gurney – For services to the community in Antrim and Ballymena, Northern Ireland.
- Patricia Wendy Halls Haddleton – For services to the community in Bollington, Cheshire.
- Christopher Hagan – For services to the community in Killyleagh, County Down.
- Mohammed Amal El-Hajji – Front of House Security Manager, Ministry of Justice Headquarters. For services to the Ministry of Justice.
- Alison Graham Hall – Chair, Dumfries and Galloway Branch, Stillbirth and Neonatal Death Charity. For services to charity in Dumfries and Galloway.
- Ashley Jayne Hall – Fundraiser and Volunteer, Rocklands Special School, Lichfield. For services to Education.
- Richard Philip Hall – For services to Adventure Therapy and Addiction Recovery through Sailaday OK in South West England.
- Mark Christian Harling – Physical Education Officer, H.M. Prison Humber. For services to H.M. Prison Service.
- Anthony Stuart Harris – For services to the community in Stogursey, Somerset.
- Elizabeth Ann Harris – For services to the community in Stogursey, Somerset.
- Dr. William Huw John Harrison – Organist and Director of Music, St. Mary's Church, Tenby. For services to Music in Tenby, Pembrokeshire.
- June Mary Heald – For services to the community in Selston, Nottinghamshire.
- Wilma Isobel Erskine-Heggarty – Club Secretary and Manager, Royal Portrush Golf Club. For services to Northern Ireland Tourism and to Golf.
- Marion Henderson – lately Sub-Postmistress, Little Brechin, Angus. For services to the Post Office and to the community in Brechin.
- Janice Hendrie – Senior Athletics Coach, Inverclyde Athletic Club. For services to Sport and Wellbeing in Inverclyde.
- Joyce Alice Hicks – For charitable services in Melksham, Wiltshire.
- Maureen Georgina Higham – Founder, Stay and Play Group, Warrington. For services to Children and to the community in Radley Common.
- Monica Susan Hill – Community Volunteer, Mothers and Toddlers Group, Hurstpierpoint, West Sussex. For services to Children and Families.
- Olga Jennifer Hirst – For services to Calderdale Help in Bereavement and to the community in Halifax, West Yorkshire.
- Anthony James Hoare – For services to the community in Chalfont St. Giles, Buckinghamshire.
- Maurice Hodgson. Watch Manager – Bolton-le-Sands Fire Stations, Lancashire. For services to Fire Safety.
- Pauline Holloway – For services to National Maritime Heritage.
- Paul John Howard – For services to Elderly People through the Minnie Bennett Sheltered Accommodation Home for the Elderly in Greenwich, South East London.
- Jeanette Howse – Founder, Didcot Christmas Street Fair. For services to Tourism in Didcot.
- John Hughes – Chairman, Newtownabbey Police Voluntary Welfare Group. For services to Police Welfare in Northern Ireland.
- William Hughes – For services to the Fishing Industry in the East Neuk of Fife.
- Maureen Raye Hume – For services to Charitable Fundraising and to the community in Northern Ireland.
- Margaret May Elizabeth (Pearl) Hutchinson – Chair, Kilrea Local History Group. For services to the community in Kilrea, Coleraine, Northern Ireland.
- Janet Inglis – Deputy Headteacher, Immanuel College, Bradford. For services to Education.
- James Jackson – Head Caretaker, Woodhouse College, London Borough of Barnet. For services to Education.
- Councillor Martha Glenys Dianne James – For voluntary service to the community in St. David's, Pembrokeshire.
- Rebecca Alexandra Jeffree – Co-founder, Women's Network, Department for Energy and Climate Change. For services to Gender Equality in the Workplace.
- Keith Jenkins – For voluntary service to the community, particularly to Young People, in Clydach Vale and in the Mid Rhondda Valley, Rhondda Cynon Taff.
- Zena Valerie Jenkins – For voluntary service to Llangunnor Primary School, Carmarthenshire and the Women's Institute.
- David Job – For services to the community in Down Ampney, Gloucestershire.
- Julia Job – For services to the community in Down Ampney, Gloucestershire.
- Paul Johnson – Chairman, Rotary Clubs of Cardiff and the Vale of Glamorgan Young Carers' Network. For services to Young Carers.
- Barbara Jones – Chair, Victoria Park Residents' Association. For voluntary service to the community and Community Cohesion in Wrexham.
- Gemma Louise Jordan – For services to Voluntary and Charitable Organisations.
- Effat Rahimi-Kaloujeh – SIMS Operational Manager (Inclusion), Westminster Academy, London. For services to Education.
- John Kelly – For voluntary service to Mountpottinger Methodist Church and to the community in East Belfast.
- Jessie Helena Elizabeth Kinna – Director, Furniture Plus. For services to Charity in Dunfermline, Fife.
- Henry Douglas Lamont – For voluntary service to Upperlands Community Development Ltd, Maghera.
- Michael Lawson – For services to Heritage and to the community in Chadderton, Greater Manchester.
- Mary Alice Leech – For voluntary service to the community in Newport.
- Alan Lemin – Head of Student Recruitment, Plymouth College of Art. For services to Further and Higher Education and to the community in Cornwall.
- Paula Lewis – Bereavement Officer, Royal Glamorgan Hospital, Rhondda Cynon Taff. For services to the NHS.
- Thomas William Golding Lewis – For services to Music and the community in Newport, South Wales.
- Maureen Sylvia Lewsey – Member, Kent County Priory Group. For voluntary service to St. John Ambulance.
- Vincent Lobley – Volunteer, Humberside Police. For services to the community in North East Lincolnshire.
- Elizabeth Alice Longhurst – Chair, Tring Squash Rackets Club. For services to Squash in Tring.
- Margaret Mary Lovett – For services to Guiding.
- Catriona Mackinnon Macaskill – For services to the Gaelic Language and Culture.
- Helen Grant Macdonald – For services to Older People in Stirling and Stirlingshire.
- Colin Alastair Mackie – Creator of the Directory of British Diplomats. For services to heritage and public history.
- Mary Ann Macleod – Convenor, The Lewis and Harris Breast Cancer Support Group. For services to the Treatment of Breast Cancer in Lewis and Harris.
- Robert Oliver Madine – For services to Swimming in Northern Ireland.
- Angela Magon – Higher Officer, Specialist Investigation, London, H.M. Revenue and Customs. For voluntary service to Young People through the National Mentoring Consortium.
- Betty Marsh – For services to the Humberston Hydrotherapy Pool and to the community in Cleethorpes, Lincolnshire.
- Nicholas Roy Martin – Co-founder and Fundraiser, Miracles To Believe in Charity, Leicestershire and Rutland. For services to Children and Families.
- Elaine June Mayaski – For services to Young People through the St. James' Church Girls' Brigade.
- Margaret Ann McCrimmon – Personal Secretary, Business Manager, Sheriffdom of Lothian and Borders, Scottish Government. For services to Law and Order and to Charity.
- Catherine McGuire – For services to the community in East Renfrewshire.
- William Blyth McKenna – For voluntary service to the NHS in North Wales and Stockport and to Blind Veterans UK.
- Joseph Edward McLaughlin – For services to Charity in Eglinton and Londonderry.
- Heather Budge McLean – For services to the community in Thurso, Caithness.
- Valerie McPherson – Chair, Regional Thames Valley Neighbourhood Watch Association. For services to Policing and Community Safety.
- (Ann) Eileen McMahon – Skin Camouflage Practitioner (Voluntary) In recognition of Services to the Community in Bedfordshire.
- Peter McQuade – For services to the community in Falkirk.
- David William Aaron McQuigg – Secretary and Director of Youth Football, Fivemiletown United Football Club. For services to Sport in Northern Ireland.
- Timothy Meynell – School Governor and Volunteer Music Teacher, Alconbury Church of England Primary School, Cambridgeshire. For services to Education.
- Colin Eagle Miles – Technical Manager, Faculty of Physical Sciences and Engineering, University of Southampton. For services to Laboratory Facilities.
- Richard William Thomas Miles – Community Engagement Officer, Northumbria Police. For services to the community.
- Jessie May Miller – For services to the community in Oswestry, Shropshire and to Women in Northern Ghana through Buttons for Africa.
- Evelyn Mills – Administrative Officer, Department for Environment, Food and Rural Affairs and Waterways Volunteer, Canal and River Trust. For services to Inland Waterways.
- Elaine Suzette Milne – For services to charity and to the community in Corbridge and Hexham, Northumberland.
- Catherine Ann Mitchell – Cleaner, Annan Police Station. For services to Dumfries and Galloway Division, Police Scotland.
- Mary Margaret Mitchell – Fundraising Volunteer and Divisional Vice-President, NSPCC NI.
- Michael David Mogridge – Secretary, Oxfordshire Branch, SSAFA. For voluntary service to SSAFA.
- David John Monaghan – company secretary and director, Fermanagh Community Transport. For services to Rural Transport in Northern Ireland.
- Angela Jean Money – Neighbourhood Watch Volunteer. For services to Policing and Community Safety in Newbury and Thatcham, Berkshire.
- Lawrence Spence Murphy – For services to Sport and to the community in Northern Ireland.
- Paul Edward Murphy – For services to Rugby Union.
- Richard Alexus Murphy – For services to the community in Northern Ireland.
- Dennis Stafford Nash – For services to the community and Charity in Newtownards, Northern Ireland.
- The Reverend Susan Mary Nutt – For services to the community in Barnham and Bury St. Edmonds, Suffolk.
- Doreen Rose Oatham – For services to the Girl Guide and Brownie Movement and to the community in Palmers Green, North London.
- Dorothy Maria Oliver – For services to Choral Music in Pontypridd, Rhondda Cynon Taff.
- Margaret O'Prey – Voluntary Nursery Assistant, Petts Wood Playgroup for Children with Special Needs, Kent. For services to Children and to the Community in Petts Wood.
- Elizabeth Sweetlove Orr – Manager, Fairhaven Residential Home. For services to the community in Belfast, Northern Ireland.
- Renee Ounsley – Secretary, Pollington Memorial Garden Committee. For voluntary service to Royal Air Force Veterans.
- James Owens – For services to Badminton in the West of Scotland.
- Alan Parish – Volunteer Archivist and Alumni Events Organiser, City University London. For services to Higher Education.
- Sonia Helen Hutcheson Crawford Ritchie-Park – Volunteer and Fundraiser, Swan Lodge Lifehouse. For services to Homeless People in Sunderland.
- Terence Henry Parker – For services to Disability Tennis in Gloucestershire.
- Roger Douglas Parmiter – lately Chair, Friends of Oystermouth Castle, Swansea. For services to Heritage and to the community in Swansea.
- Roy Pascoe – For services to the community in West Cornwall.
- Maureen Linda Patch – Officer, National Crime Agency. For public service.
- Leslie Roy Paterson – Scout Leader, 1st Maryculter Scouts. For services to the Scouting Movement and to the community in Maryculter, Aberdeen.
- Jenny Susan Pearce – For services to People with Visual Impairments.
- Mark Daniel Peers – For charitable services through the Alder Hey Children's Charity in Liverpool, Merseyside.
- Robert Charles Pegnall – For services to the community in Woodbridge, Suffolk.
- Isabel De Pelet – Founder, Guggleton Farm Arts Project. For services to Artists in Dorset.
- Anthony Richard Perry – Flood and Coastal Risk Manager, Environment Agency. For services to the Environment and Flood Risk Management and to the community.
- Deirdre Philips – Fire Emergency Support Co-ordinator, Humberside Fire and Rescue Service. For services to the community.
- Nanette Lynne Pullinger – lately Learning Support Assistant, Burford School, Marlow Bottom, Buckinghamshire. For services to Education.
- Alison Margaret Purkins – Guide Leader. For services to Guiding in Edinburgh.
- Shane Quinn – Organiser and Debate Chair, Northern Ireland Schools Debating Competition. For services to Young People in Northern Ireland.
- Yvonne Ramsey – Member, Kinsfolkcarers. For services to Kinship Care Families in Edinburgh.
- Trevor Llewellyn Richards – lately Capital Project Liaison Officer, School of Clinical Medicine, University of Cambridge. For services to for Biomedical Research and the Welfare of Animals in Research.
- John Richardson – For services to Charity in the North East of England.
- Barbara Elizabeth Roberts – Founder, Withington Hedgehog Care Trust. For services to the Rescue and Rehabilitation of Hedgehogs.
- Phyllis Roberts JP – For services to the community in Blaenavon, Torfaen.
- David Malcolm Robinson – For services to the community in Cleveland, North East England.
- Diana Elizabeth Robinson – School Volunteer and Chair, Old Girls' Association, Bury Girls' Grammar School. For services to Education.
- Sarah Elizabeth Rodgers – For services to the community in Cottingham.
- Suzanne Josephine Rowand – Personal Assistant, H.M. Treasury. For services to Public Administration and Disability Awareness.
- Michael Alan Rowling – For services to Athletics in Cornwall.
- Yvonne Rufus – For charitable services.
- Joan Sadler – For services to the community in York, North Yorkshire.
- Dr. Shazad Saleem – Dentist, Manchester. For services to Dentistry.
- Dorothea Helena Savi – For services to the Sight Impaired in Edinburgh.
- Archibald Frederick Shepherd – For services to Young People in Frimley and Camberley, Surrey.
- Wendy Ann Sherlock – Curriculum Co-ordinator for Further and Higher Learning, H.M. Prison The Mount. For services to Prison Education.
- Mary Elizabeth Shewry – Manager, Rutherford Appleton Laboratory. For services to UK Scientific Research.
- Leslie Alexander Shiels JP DL – For services to the Scout Movement and to the community in Northern Ireland.
- William Herbert Derek Short – For voluntary service to the community in Northern Ireland.
- Sarah Cockburn Simpson – For services to Amateur Dramatics in Edinburgh.
- Fauja Singh – Marathon Runner. For services to Sport and Charity.
- Margot Small – Volunteer, Failsworth Children's Centre, Burnley, Lancashire. For services to Children and Young People.
- David Smith – For services to the Heritage of Robert Burns.
- Pamela Jean Smith – Volunteer, Ivington Church of England Primary School, Hereford. For services to Education.
- Reginald Dennis Smith – For services to Matlock Water Polo Club.
- Elizabeth Ann Stuart Glendinning-Smith – Treasurer, Sunbury and Walton Unit. For voluntary service to the Sea Cadet Corps.
- Roisin Smyth – For services to the community in Fermanagh, Northern Ireland.
- Graham William Spencer – Neighbourhood Champion, Tattenhall. For services to the community in Tattenhall, Cheshire.
- Geoffrey Roy Spokes – lately Watch Manager, Long Buckby Fire Station. For services to the community in Long Buckby, Northamptonshire.
- Stephen Stamp – Operations Team Leader, Environment Agency. For services to the Environment and Flood Risk Management.
- Judith Ann Stephens – Tutor, University of the Third Age, Sutton Coldfield. For services to Adult Education.
- Susan Margaret Stephos – Honorary Treasurer, St. Paul's Church, Athens, Greece. For services to the Anglican Chaplaincy and community charities in Greece.
- David George Stone – lately Head Gardener, Mottisfont Abbey, National Trust. For services to Horticultural Heritage.
- Eileen Joy Stonebridge – Chairman, Old Friends of Sneed Park Nature Reserve. For services to Conservation in Bristol.
- Trevor Dennis Stratford QGM – Director of Operations, Devon and Somerset Fire and Rescue Service. For services to the Fire and Rescue Service.
- Michael Kidson Swales – President, Tristan da Cunha Association. For services to the community of Tristan da Cunha.
- Deryck Sutton – For services to Young People and to the community in Bollington, Cheshire.
- Susan Pyott Sturrock Forbes Swan – Deputy Commandant, St. Andrews Ambulance Association. For voluntary service in Central Scotland.
- James Stewart Donald Swanson – For services to Rugby in Peebles.
- Brenda Swithenbank – For services to Leeds South West Trefoil Guild and to the community in Tingley, West Yorkshire.
- Josephine Sykes D.L. – For services to Drama in Chester, particularly through the Chester Mystery Plays Production Committee.
- Jonathan Harry Taylor – Founder, English Civil War Society.
- John David Thomas – For voluntary service to the National Railway Museum and the community in Bolton Percy.
- Sharon Tinn – Learning in the Community Worker, Ellesmere Port, Cheshire. For services to Adult Education.
- Leonard Totton – Mail Room Porter, Queen's University, Belfast. For services to Higher Education in Northern Ireland.
- Elizabeth Rosemary Janet Traill – Lecturer, Bishop Barham University College, Kabale, Uganda. For education services in Uganda.
- Lesley Turner – For services to Young People through the St. James' Church Lads' and Church Girls' Brigade.
- Christine Tweedie – For services to the community in East Kilbride.
- Pamela Twitchell – Former chairman, Ludlow Conservative Association. For voluntary political service.
- Alan Paul Vaughton – For services to the community in Curdworth, West Midlands.
- Elizabeth Virgo – Volunteer, Metropolitan Police Service. For voluntary service in Westminster, London.
- Joyce Edith Vizard – For services to the community in Tytherington, Gloucestershire.
- Jonathan Vogler – Working Parties Leader, Friends of Roundhay Park.
- James William Waldron – For services to the community in Bishops Tawton and Barnstaple, North Devon.
- John Francis Wall – For services to the community, particularly Young People, through Sport in Tyneside.
- Brian Ernest John Walsingham – Retained Firefighter, Corby Glen Fire Station. For services to the community.
- John Barry Warburton – For services to Culture in Oxfordshire through the Wallingford Corn Exchange.
- Rosalynde Havard Ward – For services to People with Disabilities in Sevenoaks, Kent and to Charity in Romania.
- Maurice James Warsop – Storekeeper, Ministry of Defence. For services to Defence and for charitable services to the Royal British Legion.
- Dorothy Watson – Staff Nurse, Hairmyres Hospital, East Kilbride. For services to Healthcare and charity.
- Robert Earley Watson – Member, Lisburn Rugby Club. For services to Sport in Northern Ireland.
- Susan Watson – President, RNLI Flamborough Lifeboat Supporters. For services to the RNLI.
- David George Watton – Chairman, Elford Garden Restoration Project. For services to Conservation.
- Sandra Wevill – Manager, Broughton Astley Playgroup, Broughton Astley, Leicestershire. For services to Children and Families.
- Philomena Patricia White – For services to the community in Birmingham, West Midlands.
- Jeanne Dorothy Mary Wilde – For services to the community in Burley, Hampshire.
- Christopher James Willder – Grounds Person, Brooksby Melton College. For services to Horticulture and Land-Based Education.
- Anne Williams – lately Community Development Officer, Loughborough College; Borough Councillor, Charnwood. For services to Further Education and to the community in Leicestershire.
- Geoffrey Vernon Williams – For services to the Southport Talking Newspaper for the Blind in Southport, Merseyside.
- John Charles Williams – For services to the community in Hungerford, Berkshire.
- Sally Jennifer Williams – For services to Charity and to the community in Bourne End, Buckinghamshire.
- Michael Gordon Williamson – For services to Winscombe Rugby Club and to the community in Winscombe, North Somerset.
- Amy Innes Wilson – For services to the community in Drumoak and Durris, Aberdeenshire.
- Dr. Arthur James Winfield – Project Leader, Mither Kirk Project. For services to Heritage in Aberdeen.
- Mark Mclean Wylie – For services to Sport in the Shetland Isles and to Charity Abroad.
- Robert Stuart Wysome – For services to Music in Shropshire.

=== Royal Red Cross (RRC) ===
Ribbon bar of the Royal Red Cross and Associate

==== Associate Royal Red Cross (ARRC) ====
- Lieutenant Sarah Kay Thompson – Queen Alexandra's Royal Naval Nursing Service

=== Queen's Police Medal (QPM) ===
Ribbon bar of the Queen's Police Medal for Merit, as awarded for Distinguished Service

- Simon John Alcock – Constable, Suffolk Constabulary.
- Stephen Allen – Deputy Chief Constable, Police Service of Scotland.
- Graham John Alexander Cassidy – lately Chief Superintendent, South Yorkshire Police.
- Rebecca Cawsey – Detective Inspector, Avon and Somerset Constabulary.
- Simon Edens, Deputy Chief Constable, Leicestershire Constabulary.
- James Lawson Guy – Chief Superintendent, Eastern Sovereign Base Area, Cyprus.
- Steven Patrick Kershaw – lately Detective Chief Superintendent, Metropolitan Police Service.
- Paul Marshall – lately Deputy Chief Constable, Suffolk Constabulary.
- Janette Elise McCormick – Deputy Chief Constable, Cheshire Constabulary.
- Mark McLaren – Chief Superintendent, Police Service of Scotland.
- Simon McNee – Sergeant, Police Service of Northern Ireland.
- Stephanie Morgan – lately Temporary Deputy Chief Constable, Leicestershire Constabulary.
- Marshall Moyes – Special Constable, Police Service of Scotland.
- Gary Alwyne Parkin – Superintendent, Derbyshire Constabulary.
- Thomas Stevenson – Sergeant, Police Service of Northern Ireland.
- Helen Spooner – Detective Inspector, Cheshire Constabulary.
- Oliver Richard Tayler – Sergeant, Devon and Cornwall Constabulary.
- Peter Hugh Terry – Commander, Metropolitan Police Service.
- Jonathan Wilson Ward – Chief Superintendent, Merseyside Police.
- David Charles Wildbore – Chief Superintendent, British Transport Police.
- Stephen Wilson – Detective Inspector, Police Service of Northern Ireland.
- Giles Tristan York – Chief Constable, Sussex Police.

=== Queen's Fire Service Medal (QFSM) ===
Ribbon bar of the Queen's Fire Service Medal for Merit, as awarded for Distinguished Service

- David Goodhew – Assistant Chief Officer, Scottish Fire and Rescue Service.
- James Anthony Owen – Deputy County Fire Officer, Greater Manchester Fire and Rescue Service.
- William Paterson – Crew Manager, Scottish Fire and Rescue Service.
- Robert Ratcliffe – Assistant chief fire officer, Hampshire Fire and Rescue Service.
- Richard James Smith – lately chief fire officer, Mid and West Wales Fire and Rescue Service.
- Daniel John Stephens – chief fire officer, Merseyside Fire and Rescue Service.
- Desmond George Tidbury – chief fire officer and Director of Community Safety and Protection, Cornwall Fire and Rescue Service.

=== Queen's Ambulance Service Medal (QAM) ===
Ribbon bar of the Queen's Ambulance Service Medal for Merit, as awarded for Distinguished Service

- Derek Cartwright – Director of Operations, North West Ambulance Service NHS Trust.
- Kenneth McFadzean – Head of Service, Scottish Ambulance Service.
- Keith Thrower – Emergency Care Assistant, East Midlands Ambulance Service NHS Trust.

=== Queen's Volunteer Reserves Medal (QVRM) ===
Ribbon bar of the Queen's Volunteer Reserves Medal

- Warrant Officer Class 2 Brian Robert Jones – Royal Marines Reserve
- Lieutenant Colonel Bibek Banerjee – Royal Army Medical Corps Army Reserve
- Lieutenant Colonel Dominique Sara Cairns TD – Royal Corps of Signals, Army Reserve
- Warrant Officer Class 1 Michael Hancock – The Mercian Regiment Army Reserve
- Acting Brigadier Philip Rowland Mixer TD – Late Royal Army Medical Corps, Army Reserve
- Warrant Officer Class 2 Richard Edward Ruddom – The Royal Logistic Corps Army Reserve
- Corporal Alan Michael Hayman – Royal Auxiliary Air Force

=== Overseas Territories Police Medal (OTPM) ===
Ribbon bar of the Overseas Territories Police Medal for Merit, as awarded for Meritorious Service

- George Kiteos – Superintendent, Western Sovereign Base Area, Sovereign Base Areas Police.

== Crown Dependencies ==
=== The Most Excellent Order of the British Empire ===
==== Officer of the Order of the British Empire (OBE) ====
Civil
Guernsey

- Stephen Le Poidevin, for public service to law and community in Guernsey,

Jersey

- John Tibbo, for services to the Royal Court

Isle of Man

- Andrew Corlett, for services to the Manx economy

==== Member of the Order of the British Empire (MBE) ====
Guernsey

- Bill Luff, for service to the cattle industry

Jersey

- Robert Christensen, for services to charity
- John Farley, for services to the community

Isle of Man

- Stephen Bradley, for services to the Manx retailing sector
- Charles Fargher, for services to Manx charities and community

=== British Empire Medal (BEM) ===
Guernsey

- Roy Sarre, for service to the church and music

Jersey

- Ernie Mallet, for services to young people, particularly in music education.
- Pascaline Joseph, for services to the elderly (honorary)

Isle of Man

- Norman Rivers, for his services to Friends of Chernobyl's Children charity

== Cook Islands ==
Below are the individuals appointed by Elizabeth II in her right as Queen of New Zealand, on advice of the Cook Islands Government.

== Barbados ==
Below are the individuals appointed by Elizabeth II in her right as Queen of Barbados, on advice of the Barbadian Government.

=== Knight Bachelor ===
- Austin Llewellyn Sealy – For services to Sport Administration.

== Grenada ==
Below are the individuals appointed by Elizabeth II in her right as Queen of Grenada, on advice of the Grenadian Government.

=== The Most Excellent Order of the British Empire ===
==== Commander of the Order of the British Empire (CBE) ====
- Dr. Lawrence Albert Joseph – For public service.

==== Member of the Order of the British Empire (MBE) ====
- Rhoda Joan Henry – For services to the community

=== British Empire Medal (BEM) ===
Civil Division

- Lazarus Antoine – For services to culture.
- Albert A. Joseph – For services to sport and to the community.

== Solomon Islands ==
Below are the individuals appointed by Elizabeth II in her right as Queen of the Solomon Islands, on advice of the Solomon Islands Government.

=== The Most Excellent Order of the British Empire ===
==== Officer of the Order of the British Empire (OBE) ====
- Charles Kelly – For services to the Solomon Islands Red Cross Society.
- Loyley Ngira – For services to telecommunications in the Solomon Islands.
- Jacob Pitu – For services to local politics, governance and agriculture.

==== Member of the Order of the British Empire (MBE) ====
- Mathew Fakaia – For services to business, commerce, education and community development.

=== British Empire Medal (BEM) ===
Civil Division

- Sotere Ria – For services to Health Education, particularly in the Guadalcanal Province.

== Tuvalu ==
Below are the individuals appointed by Elizabeth II in her right as Queen of Tuvalu, on advice of the Tuvalu Government.

=== The Most Excellent Order of the British Empire ===
==== Officer of the Order of the British Empire (OBE) ====
- Vete Palakua Sakaio – For public and community service.

==== Member of the Order of the British Empire (MBE) ====
- Lutelu Faavae – For public and community service.
- Dr. Stephen Homasi – For public and community service.
- Polau Kofe – For public and community service.

=== British Empire Medal (BEM) ===
Civil Division

- Fuafanua Fapaologa – For public and community service.
- Amosa Soani – For public and community service.
- Eli Teuea – For public and community service.

== Belize ==
Below are the individuals appointed by Elizabeth II in her right as Queen of Belize, on advice of the Belizean Government.

=== The Most Excellent Order of the British Empire ===
==== Commander of the Order of the British Empire (CBE) ====
- Michael Clarence Edward Young – For services to the legal profession and to the community.

==== Officer of the Order of the British Empire (OBE) ====
- Esther Ayuso – For services to the community and to women's rights.
- Laura Tucker-Longsworth – For services to nursing and to the community.

==== Member of the Order of the British Empire (MBE) ====
- Bernadette Fernandez – For services to the community and to leadership.

== Antigua and Barbuda ==
Below are the individuals appointed by Elizabeth II in her right as Queen of Antigua and Barbuda, on advice of the Antiguan and Barbudan Government.

=== The Most Excellent Order of the British Empire ===
==== Officer of the Order of the British Empire (OBE) ====
- Samuel Robert Aymer – For public service

==== Member of the Order of the British Empire (MBE) ====
- Rendell O'Neal – For public service.
- Lorrain Cecilia Perry – For public service

== Saint Christopher and Nevis ==
Below are the individuals appointed by Elizabeth II in her right as Queen of Saint Kitts and Nevis, on advice of the Kittian and Nevisian Government.

=== The Most Distinguished Order of Saint Michael and Saint George ===
==== Knight Commander of the Order of St Michael and St George (KCMG) ====
- Kutayba Yusuf Alghanim CMG – For services to the development of St. Christopher and Nevis.

=== The Most Excellent Order of the British Empire ===
==== Officer of the Order of the British Empire (OBE) ====
- Wendell Everton Lawrence – For public service.

==== Member of the Order of the British Empire (MBE) ====
- Sylvia Viola Manning – For services to general nursing and nutrition.
- Lorna I. R. Richards – For public service.

== Collated lists ==
- United Kingdom:
  - HM Government (30 December 2014). "New Year's Honours lists 2015" (PDF). Honours Lists. Cabinet Office and Foreign Office.
