= Michael Chowen =

British businessman and philanthropist

Michael David Lincoln Chowen CBE DL is a British businessman and philanthropist.

Michael Chowen studied civil engineering at Birmingham University from 1958 to 1961. Chowen was the founder of Sussex Stationers. He has donated to a number of educational organisations including to the University of Brighton to set up a research project to reduce greenhouse gases. Chowen was awarded the honorary degree of Doctor of Science by the University of Brighton for his philanthropic activities in education. He was awarded the honorary degree of Doctor of the University by the University of Sussex. He was appointed a Commander of the Order of the British Empire (CBE) in the 2015 New Year Honours for charitable services. He is a Deputy Lieutenant of East Sussex for the Brighton and Hove area.
