= Weobley =

Village in Herefordshire, England

Coordinates: 52.159°N 2.873°W

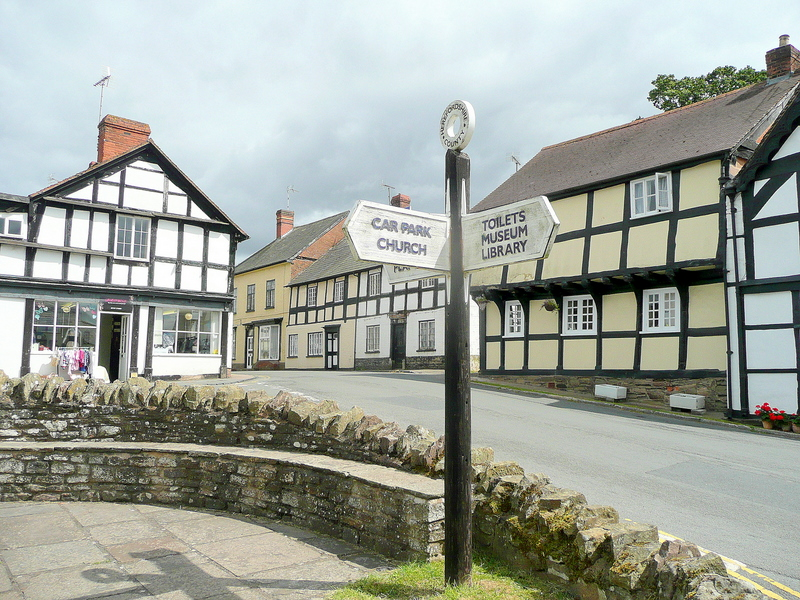
- Signpost in village centre

- Location within Herefordshire
- Population: 1,255 (2011)
- Civil parish: Weobley
- Unitary authority: Herefordshire
- Ceremonial county: Herefordshire
- Region: West Midlands
- Country: England
- Sovereign state: United Kingdom
- Post town: HEREFORD
- Postcode district: HR4
- Dialling code: 01544
- Police: West Mercia
- Fire: Hereford and Worcester
- Ambulance: West Midlands
- UK Parliament: North Herefordshire

Weobley (/ˈwɛbli/ WEB-lee) is an ancient settlement and civil parish in Herefordshire, England. Formerly a market town, the market is long defunct and the settlement is today promoted as one of the county's black and white villages owing to its abundance of old timber-framed buildings. Although it has the historical status of a town and is referred to as such in the sources, it nowadays refers to itself as a village.

== Topography ==
=== Landscape ===
Weobley is in an entirely rural location, 12 miles (19 km) north-west of Hereford and 8 miles (13 km) south-west of Leominster. It occupies the small shallow valley of the little Marl Brook in the northern lower dip slope of Burton Hill, overlooking the valley of the Newbridge Brook which is a sub-tributary of the River Arrow. The surrounding countryside is mostly farmland, with a few small named ancient woods. However, to the south the deer park of Garnstone Castle (formerly Garnstone Manor) separates the settlement from the wooded heights of Burton Hill. The “castle” was a castellated mansion, an important design by John Nash 1807, which was demolished in 1959. Ornamental plantings for it survive, notably a row of Sequoiadendron giganteum trees which includes a monumental specimen of 34 feet (10 m) girth.

Weobley Marsh is a separate hamlet to the east, grouped around an area of ancient common land and traditionally a haunt of witches.

To the west is the ancient farmstead of The Ley, with a Grade-I listed farmhouse dating to 1589.

The underlying geology comprises the Raglan Mudstone Formation of the Lower Old Red Sandstone. The soils are argillic brown earths, of high fertility.

=== Layout ===
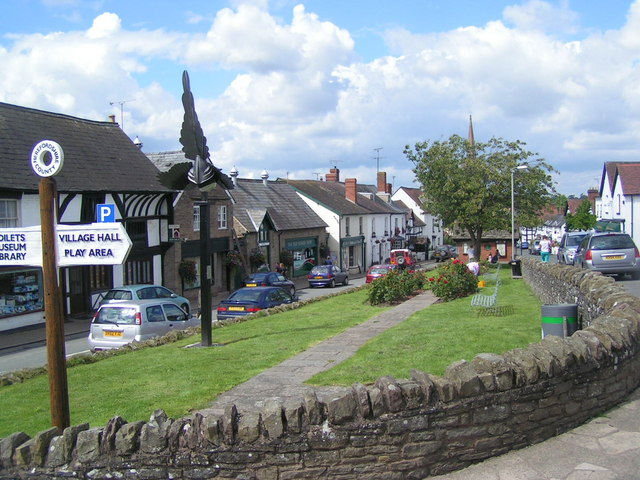
Weobley, former marketplace

The historical layout of the settlement, on which the majority of the old buildings stand, is in the form of an inverted T. The crossbar of the T is the High Street, and the stem is the funnel-shaped mediaeval marketplace comprising a triangular area abutting the High Street and extended to the north by the aptly-named Broad Street. The triangle used to have a row of infill buildings, but these were demolished in the mid 20th century and replaced by a small urban park called the Rose Garden. The west side of the former marketplace is called Portland Street, and the south side is Market Pitch.

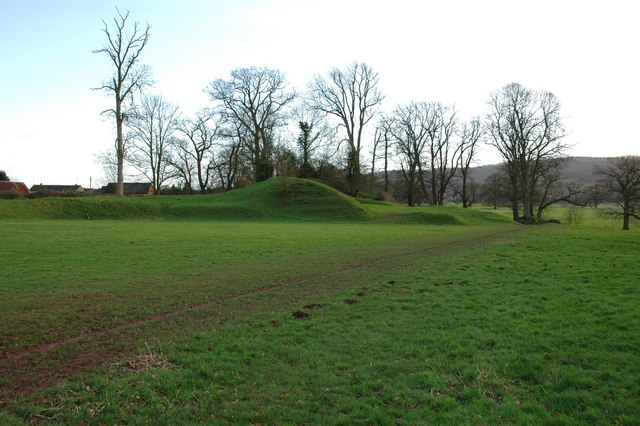
Earthworks of Weobley Castle

To the south of the High Street is the site of a mediaeval castle, but this has no civic presence. It abuts the Garnstone deer-park, and is described as a ring and bailey. The track leading to it from the High Street is flanked by an avenue of oaks planted in 1837 to mark the accession of Queen Victoria.

From towards the east end of the High Street, and running to the east of the castle, is the Hereford Road. This was originally a turnpike road to Hereford, but is now just a country lane.

At the north end of Broad Street, Bell Square runs to the west with more old buildings, then turns to the north-west as Meadow Street (B4230) to become the road to Kington. Bell Square is very wide for a street, and has been suggested as the core of the pre-13th century village arranged around an early marketplace or small village green.

The west end of the High Street turns south then west as Mill Bank, named after an impressive mid 19th century brick corn mill but formerly known as Chamber Walk, and this becomes the B4230 road to Hereford. The mill is Grade II listed.

The ancient parish church of SS Peter and Paul is oddly placed, away from the built-up area to the north and accessed by a country lane called Church Road which is a continuation of Broad Street. More unusually, this lane doubles back on itself after running round the churchyard and ends a short distance west of where it started, forming a dead-end hairpin loop. This has been suggested as the ghost of the pre-13th century village, arranged between the church and an early marketplace or small village green at Bell Square. A small grassy area is due south of the churchyard, and this used to be the town's bowling green.

The B4230 does not enter the old town centre, but runs directly from Mill Bank to Meadow Street via a little bypass called Back Lane which roughly parallels Broad Street to the west. This is an old thoroughfare; the name in other mediaeval boroughs is known to indicate an access route to the back ends of a set of thin land strips called burgage tenements. One of these would comprise a town house with a smallholding at its rear, usually with back access so that farm animals did not have to be taken through the house -hence Back Lane.

The historical core of the settlement is a conservation area.

Two housing estates of the latter half of the 20th century more than doubled the size of the settlement. They are Bearcroft, north of Gadbridge Road which is the eastern continuation of the High Street, and Burtonwood which is east of Hereford Road. A small industrial estate, the Whitehill Business Park, was set up on the Kington Road.

== History ==
=== Early days ===
A detailed archaeological survey of the site of the castle in 2002, using ground-penetrating radar, gave indications of an Iron Age settlement here.

There are a few Roman surface finds. A coin of Constantine the Great was found in the town in the 17th century. In 2001, two brooches and six coins were found close to The Ley.

=== Saxons ===
The settlement existed in Saxon times, as evidenced from its entry in the Domesday Book. In 1066, the village was owned by “Edwy the Noble’’ and had ten villagers, five smallholders, eleven slaves, one priest and two “other”. It was valued at £5, and was in the Hundred of Stretford.

In the Domesday Book the village name was transcribed as Wibelai. The name possibly derives from 'Wibba's Ley', a ley from the Old English for a field, and Wibba being a local Saxon landowner. It is still pronounced as "Web-ley" (the spelling being similar to nearby Leominster, the letter 'o' in whose name also is not pronounced).

Whether the Saxon settlement was nucleated and, if so, where it was located, are both uncertain although Bell Square is suggested and possible house platforms identified. Also uncertain is the location of the place of worship served by the priest mentioned in the Domesday Book, as the earliest extant fabric in the present church is Norman.

Two hints exist as regards the status of the Saxon place of worship. One is that the later church had the same dedication as the nearby great minster of Leominster, that of SS Peter and Paul. However, there is no documentation to support the claim that Weobley was a dependent chapel in the original area of the Leominster parochia according to the Minster hypothesis. The other is that the Domesday survey listed a priest but not the church or chapel; since the survey was of landholdings producing an income, this hints that the church had no independent revenue and so was not yet parochial.

=== Church ===
The parish church is the oldest surviving building in Weobley.

The Domesday book listed the Lord of the manor in 1086 as Roger de Lacy. The de Lacy family was to become very powerful. Hugh de Lacy became Lord of the manor in 1091, and he is credited with building the forerunner of the present church early in the next century -the Norman south doorway of this survives, albeit salvaged and re-set in a later wall.

Hugh gave his new church to his family's monastic foundation of Llanthony Priory, which established a cell (a small dependent monastery) here. However, it did not last long. The priory retained possession until the Dissolution.

The putative aisleless Norman church was re-built in an extended project which continued through most of the 13th century. This began at the start of this century, when a south aisle was added (the Norman doorway was preserved from the demolished wall, and re-used). The chancel was rebuilt about mid-century, and then the nave was reconstructed -this was only completed in the early 14th century. The work included the addition of a narrow north aisle and a clerestory; the latter involved the replacement of the south aisle arcade, only about seventy years old. The bell-tower was added to the north-west corner around 1330–40, with a spire that is the second-tallest in the county. This tower is at an angle, which is unusual, and is thought to have doubled up as a fortified peel tower against Welsh raids. Finally, the north aisle was widened in the mid 15th century in the Perpendicular style, and a large east window provided for the chancel.

=== Castle ===
The castle ruins comprise a ring and bailey – there is no motte, and no surviving stonework. However, the Garnstone deer-park contains a large flat-topped mound that has been identified as a motte -although there is doubt about this. If the identification is correct, then the first castle was not on the present site.

Weobley Castle is only first documented as existing during The Anarchy, when it was seized in person by King Stephen from Geoffrey Talbot in 1140, although it was still the property of the de Lacy family. Later, that family's involvement with the rebellion against King John by William de Braose, 4th Lord of Bramber led to the castle being in royal possession again from 1208 to 1213. A surviving depiction by Silas Taylor, executed in 1655, shows the ruin of a rectangular keep with round corner towers, and the style suggests that the castle was rebuilt by Walter II de Lacy after the de Lacy family regained ownership. However, there was no further active history and John Leland described it in 1535 as “a goodly castell, but somewhat in decay”.

A geophysical survey in 2003 revealed that the bailey had fallen out of use in the 12th century, when or soon after the stone keep had been built, and had been subdivided into burgage tenements as part of the town. However, all these had been replaced by ridge and furrow cultivation by the 17th century as the town underwent redevelopment and the smallholding portions of burgage tenements were hived off. The final removal of all stonework from the site is undocumented, but was thorough as even the foundations were dug out.

=== Mediaeval borough ===
The 2003 geophysical survey mentioned above demonstrated archaeologically that the town existed by the 13th century, and was experiencing growth. However, it never had a royal market charter which indicates that the market right was already of time immemorial in the Middle Ages. The first market was possibly at Bell Square, and if so was moved when Walter II de Lacy laid out Broad Street as a borough with flanking burgage tenements on both sides, also a single set of tenements on the west side of the present Hereford Road which took over the old castle bailey. The market day was Thursday. The new settlement was also provided with defences which were, at best, a timber palisade on a bank and ditch. This did not last long, and did not morph into a proper town wall.

Walter II did obtain a charter for an annual fair in 1231, but this was to transfer the date from the Feast of the Ascension to that of the Invention of the Holy Cross (3 May) so the origin of the fair is also unknown.

At this period there was a stack of two watermills exploiting the limited power of the little Marl Brook, one on the site of the 19th century steam mill and the other upstream. Later, windmill was built on a little hill now called “Windmill Knapp”, just west of Back Lane, by the start of the 15th century. The same location had been occupied by a pottery in the 13th century, and the site is now a Scheduled Ancient Monument.

The 1255 eyre roll for Herefordshire listed Weobley as having its own jury for legal trials at the circuit court.

There was a small Jewish community here in the late 13th century, which meant that the town was prospering commercially. It was noted for trade in particularly high-quality wool known as “Leominster Ore”. It also developed a fine leather glove industry, which was flourishing by the end of the 16th century. However, in the late Middle Ages the town was most famous for its ale -as distinct from beer, as it was not hopped. A local proverb, “Leominster bread and Weobley beer, none can come near” was first recorded in Camden's Britannia in 1610. The Welsh were very fond of ‘’cwrw Weble’’ or Weobley ale, and it features in late mediaeval Welsh poetry.

The triangular marketplace was infilled in the 14th century owing to building pressure, as the range of buildings that used to be in the surviving one between Broad Street and Portland Street (all now destroyed) allegedly contained some fabric of that age. However, the original infill consisted of two parallel rows separated by three narrow streets. The easternmost street and the eastern row were both lost in 17th century redevelopment, but the step in the eastern Broad Street frontage is the ghost of the latter. Six high-quality timber-framed buildings of the 14th century in the town survived to be listed in the 20th century.

=== Parliamentary borough ===
In 1295 the town first, briefly, became a parliamentary borough when King Edward I summoned two representatives to London, who attended parliaments until 1307. Then representation lapsed.

In 1628 Weobley was incorporated as a borough, sending two Members of Parliament to the House of Commons until the Reform Act 1832. The voting requirement specified that the “inhabitant householders” had the vote. The borough constables maintained a record of eligible voters, called the “lewn book”. Predictably the borough elections quickly became known for corruption, venality and arguments about validity, with some voters being persuaded by the supply of free drink -so that one candidate called Weobley “our liquid metropolis”.

The ancient parish of Weobley was divided into two townships, those of “Weobley Borough” and “Weobley Foreign”. There was no municipal corporation (town council), so the lord of the manor was in charge of the town and the annual court leet (as distinct from the circuit court, which was for more serious legal matters). At the court leet, two constables were elected for law enforcement purposes, and they also supervised parliamentary elections. There were no other town officials, so administratively the place was no better than a village.

In the contemporary village is “The Throne”, a large 400-year-old building - King Charles I spent the night here on 5 September 1645, after the Battle of Naseby during the English Civil War. Back then the edifice was the “Unicorn Inn”, but that business moved across the street to new premises later in the century and the former hostelry was renamed in honour of the visit.

The Market Hall (demolished in the 1860s) was a fine timber-framed building allegedly erected by John Abel (1578–1675), and located on the south-east corner of the marketplace infill. It had a large upper chamber over an open ground floor, supported by ornately carved timber posts. A drawing of it survives by Joseph Murray Ince 1839, which is now at the Rhode Island School of Design Museum in the USA. Also, paintings by William Pitt of the mid 19th century feature it.

William Crowther, a native who made his fortune as a haberdasher in London, left a legacy to found a Free Grammar School for local boys in 1653. A timber-framed edifice was provided on the west side of Hereford Street (now Hereford Road), and the school was opened in 1655. The building survives as the “Old Grammar School”. In the early 18th century a charity school for girls also existed.

John Birch, a soldier and politician who fought for the Parliamentarian cause in the First English Civil War, sat in the House of Commons at various times from 1646. He purchased the Garnstone estate and became the Lord of the manor, having himself elected as a Member of Parliament in 1679. He remained as such until his death in 1691, and has an impressive monument in the parish church. His nephew, also called John Birch, then became Lord of the manor and was also a borough MP when he died in 1735.

There are several surviving 17th century town buildings, evidence of prosperity. Also, the burgage tenements were being broken up, and many of their smallholdings were being hived off and consolidated as farm fields. This occurred on the castle site.

The confusion, venality and corruption occurring at elections (votes were being sold for £10-15 each; £2275-3300 in 2021 values) drew the attention of Parliament, and in 1736 it was resolved to restrict the franchise to occupiers (owners, or tenants having been resident for 40 days previously) of so-called “vote houses”. The annual rental value of such a property had to be £1 or over, and the occupier had to pay scot and lot which, in practice, meant the parish poor rate since there was no borough corporation. However, after this the Lord of the manor, Thomas Thynne, Viscount Weymouth (later first Marquess of Bath) instructed the constables not to register for the poor rate any resident who would not promise to vote for his candidates. This was disfranchisement, and the aggrieved voters took their case to the King's Bench. They lost, and thus Weobley became a pocket borough under the control of the Thynne family. To make sure of matters, Weymouth bought the vote houses that he did not already own.

In 1830, a House of Commons report gave the number of vote houses in 1821 as 93, but with only 81 occupiers. Allegedly the Marquess had been keeping vote houses empty until forty days before an election, when he would have temporary tenants installed who would vote obediently.

=== 19th century ===
The manufacture of gloves at Weobley received a boost at the start of the 19th century during the Napoleonic Wars, because imports of fine French gloves were stopped. At this time, the town was still famous for beer (“malt liquor”, so it was not hopped). Quarries of building stone and roadstone were in the vicinity”. There was a direct turnpike road to Hereford, the present Hereford Road. At this time, the ancient fair on 3 May had been replaced by one on Maundy Thursday for “horned cattle” (i.e. not calves) and horses, and also on the Thursday three weeks later for the same and “coarse linen cloth”.

In 1807 the castellated mansion of Garnstone Castle was built by John Nash.

The parliamentary borough was disfranchised by the Reform Act 1832. Since there was no town council, administratively the place became a village. Despite this it was chosen as the headquarters of the local poor law union, and a workhouse was opened at Whitehill on the road to Kington in 1837. A Roman Catholic church was opened in 1834, and a Primitive Methodist congregation gathered in 1839 and built a chapel in 1844 (the present structure opened in 1861). To supplement the old Grammar School, the National Society for Promoting Religious Education opened a National School in 1834.

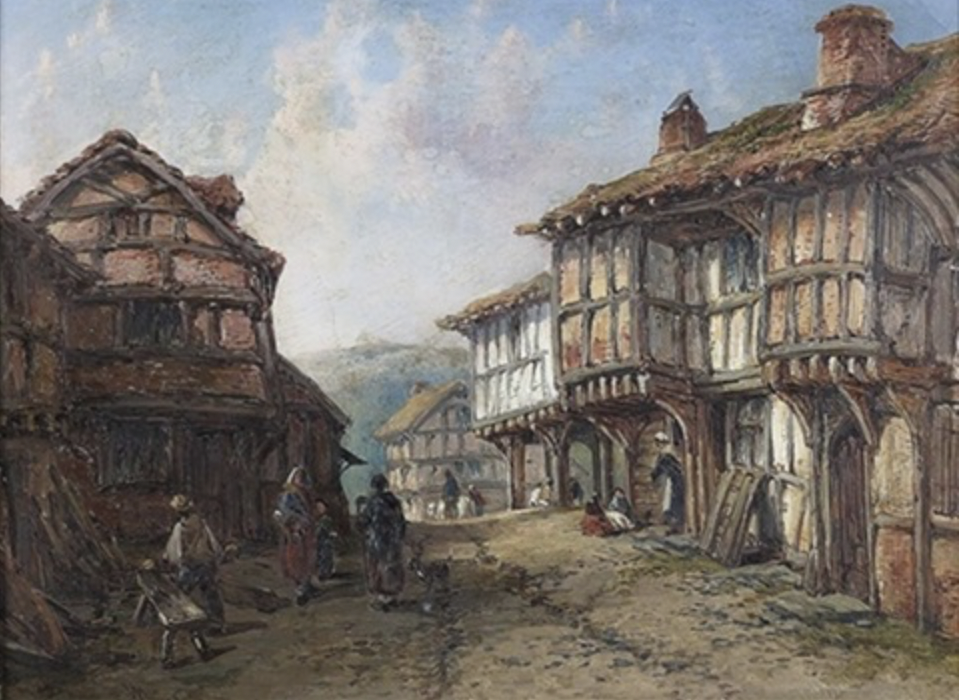
Broad Street, painted by William Pitt in 1867, showing Market Hall.

However, the town continued to morph into a village in the 1840s. John Thynne had become the fourth Marquess of Bath in 1837 aged only six, and his trustees of his estate decided to dispose of the “vote houses” by auction in 1844 and 1846. They also ordered the disposal of the Market Hall in 1848, which was the death-knell for the ancient market. The actual demolition of the Hall was in the 1860s. The old grammar school gave up, sold off its building and merged with the National School to create a co-educational school in new premises in Broad Street, later to move to an extant building in Portland Street in 1873. The population of the parish in 1841 was 907.

By 1858, the fair had been moved back near to its ancient date, on 8 May for cattle and entertainment -it was becoming a funfair. The industries producing gloves and beer had both gone, the latter being replaced by cider, and the only industry left was some malting (there was no mill yet). On the other hand, there was a new brick-built police station and courtroom in Back Lane and petty sessions were held every other Monday. A “van” (covered wagon) made the round trip to Hereford twice a week. The population in 1851 was 972.

The railways completely ignored Weobley. The nearest station, at Moorhampton, was opened on the Hereford, Hay and Brecon Railway in 1862 and was 3.5 miles (5.6 km) away.

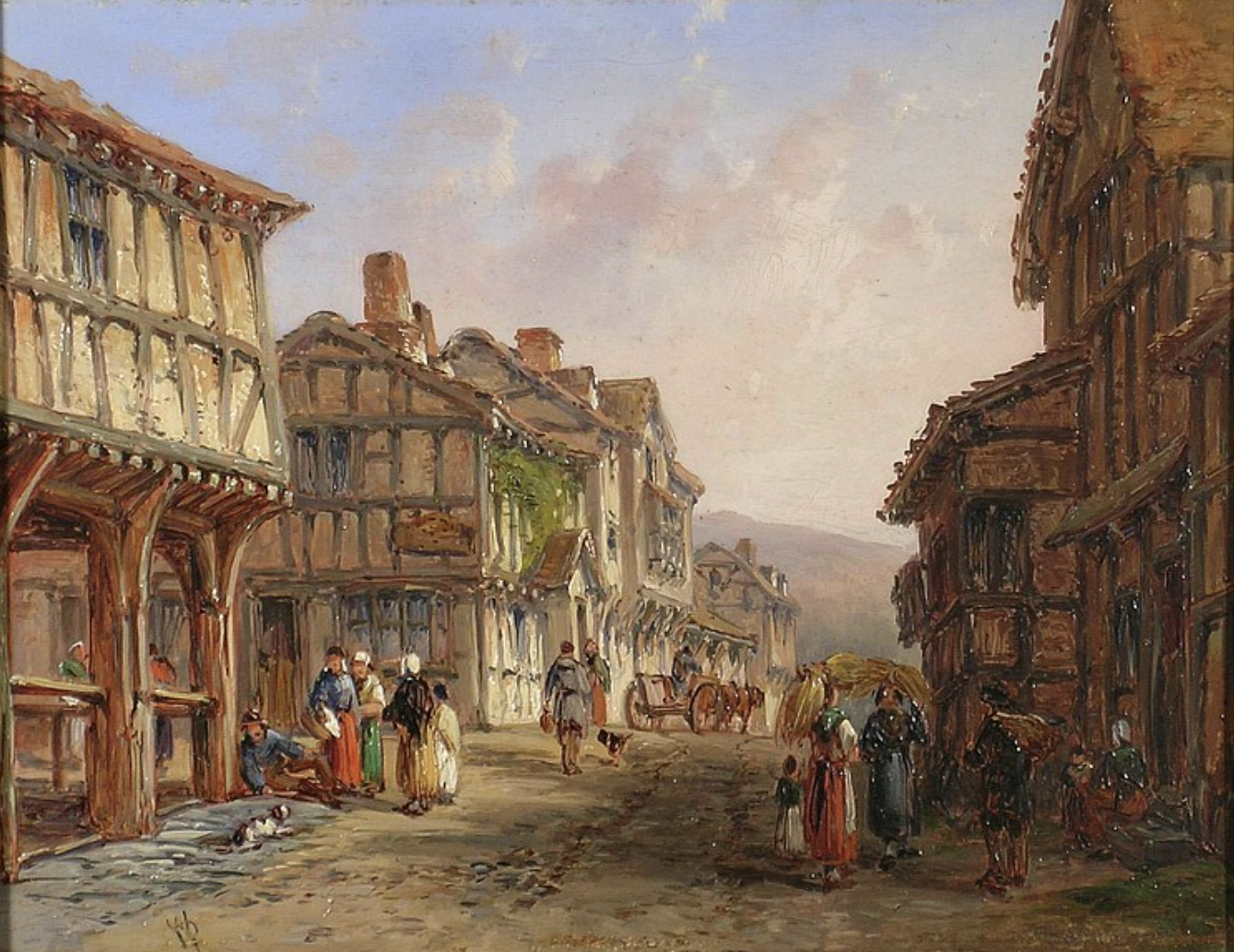
Weobley High Street by William Pitt 1853, with Market Hall on left.

The only 19th century industrial development was a corn mill powered by steam, completed in 1862. The parish church was restored in 1865, at a cost of £3 200 (2021: £416 000). In 1868, the market was “nearly obsolete”, but the place still regarded itself as a town and there was a town crier employed in 1877. A nail manufacturer was operating in the same year

The extinction of street trading meant a wave of houses being converted to shops, which are a feature of the village's architecture. Some merely had shop fronts inserted, while others suffered more radical remodelling.

Weobley Rural District Council was created in 1894, and had its offices in the Union Workhouse on the Kington road.

=== 20th century ===
In 1909 the population was 703, down from 907 in 1841. The cattle fair on 8 May was defunct (the funfair continued), and the nail manufacturer had gone. At a time when motor buses were already running in Hereford (the first was in 1908), the public cart was still clopping on the round trip to Hereford twice a week. Unusually the carter was a lady, Mrs Elizabeth Garbutt.

In that year, the decayed town had a police station, a solicitor who also acted as a bank agent and insurance broker (there was no bank here yet), another insurance broker, a “relieving officer” (in charge of poverty assistance) who was also a third such broker, a doctor, six grocers, three butchers, a baker, a chemist, a tobacconist, three inns (Unicorn, Salutation and Red Lion), three drapers (clothes and material shops), a tailor, three shoemakers, a cobbler (footwear repairer), a saddler who also dealt in bicycles and who ran the post office, two hauliers, a mason, three builders and a blacksmith. There was a set of “Recreation Rooms”. The newly established Army Reserve (then known as the Territorial Force) had a Drill Hall. Lloyds Bank later opened a branch in the village, on the corner of Broad Street and High Street.

The two world wars passed Weobley by, except that eighteen local men died in action in the first one. There were no casualties in the second.

In 1920, the Birmingham and Midland Omnibus Company, familiarly known as Midland Red, began a motor bus service to Hereford. The company and its successors (which kept the original nickname) operated until the depot in Hereford shut down in 2015.

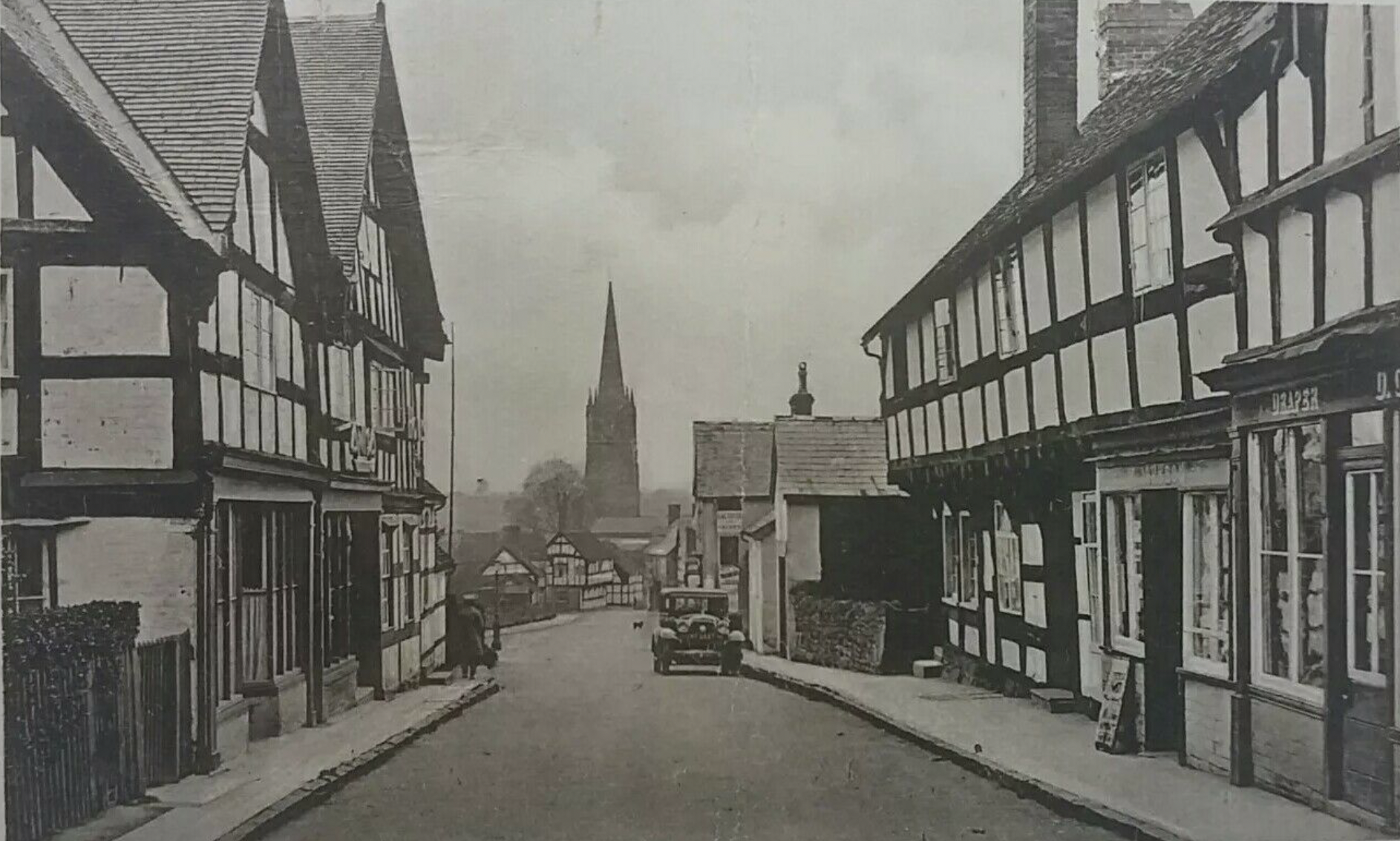
South end of Broad Street. The buildings on the left burned down in 1943.

In 1943 a serious fire in a bakery gutted the remaining old buildings of the marketplace infill, and these had to be demolished to create the little town park (the “Rose Garden”) there now. The lost timber-framed block of two houses had its origin in the late 15th century, with alterations in the following three centuries.

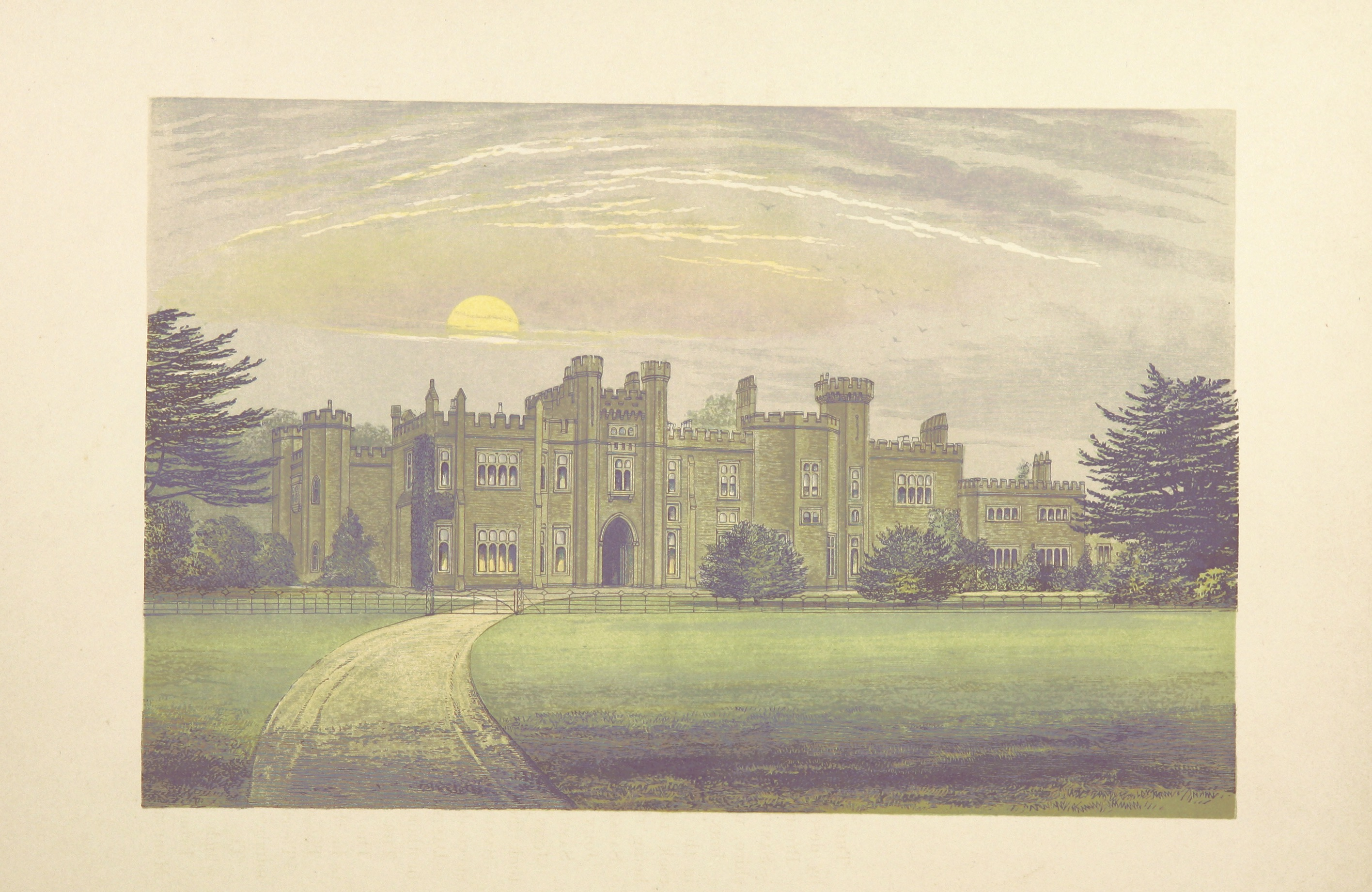
Garnstone Castle in 1867

Garnstone Castle by John Nash was demolished in 1959, the village's second major architectural loss of the 20th century.

In 1951, the population was 634 which was less than a century before. However, in 2001 the population had almost doubled to 1246 as a result of residential developments. These mostly involved the creation of the housing estates of Burtonwood and Bearcroft to the east of the historical area. The former is a council house estate built in the Fifties and early Sixties by Weobley Rural District Council, the latter was a private development from the early Seventies to the early Eighties.

=== 21st century ===
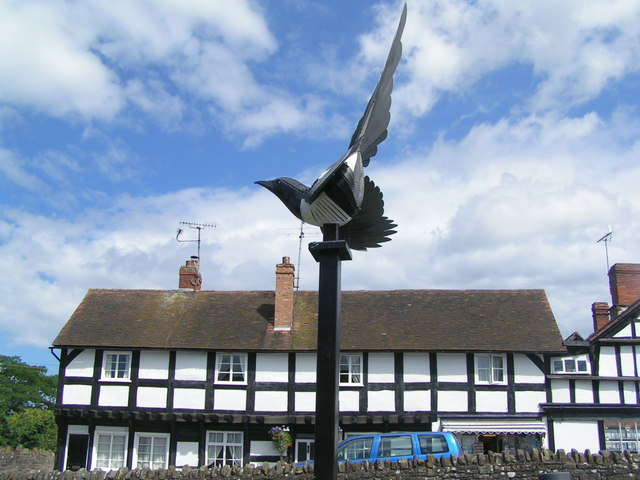
The magpie in Weobley

In 2001 the artist Walenty Pytel completed a metal sculpture of a magpie called Magnus for the village (a magpie is the village's emblem, because it is black-and-white like many of the old houses). The sculpture was commissioned after the village won the Calor Gas/Daily Telegraph Great Britain Village of the Year in 1999.

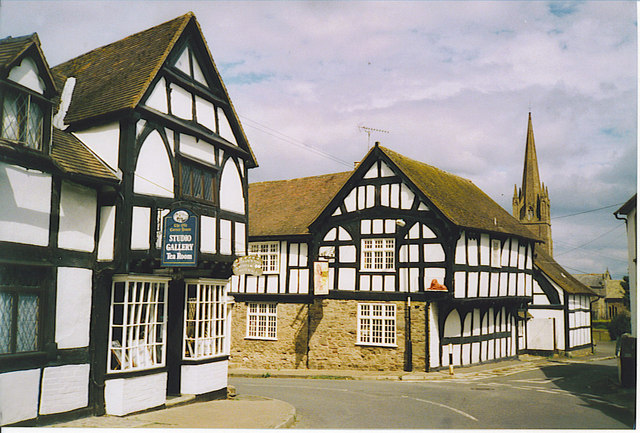
Weobley, Corner House and former Red Lion Inn

In 2015 one of Weobley's three ancient inns, the Red Lion, closed down and became an Indian restaurant.

On 3 August 2016, the BBC's The One Show was broadcast entirely from Weobley.

In 2017 the parish church was put on the Heritage at Risk Register compiled by Historic England, because the stonework of the tower and spire was rotting and there was no restoration proposal in place.

In 2019 the village's ancient brewing industry was revived when the Weobley Brewing Company set up a brewhouse in Portland Street.

In 2021 an endowment allowed the creation of a nature reserve, named the Weobley Wildlife Meadows and run by the Herefordshire Wildlife Trust.

== Governance ==
Weobley has never had a municipal corporation or town council. Before 1894, the parish vestry was in charge of routine civic administration, and the Lord of the manor was in charge of the annual manorial court leet which elected two constables for law enforcement purposes. This was the same as for any parochial village in England. Then the Local Government Act 1894 created Weobley Parish Council under Weobley Rural District Council, the latter in turn being subject to Herefordshire County Council.

Weobley Rural District Council was absorbed into Leominster District Council in 1974, which in turn was abolished in 1998 to leave Herefordshire Council as a unitary authority. The Parish Council has an advisory role, and is responsible for certain public amenities. The population of the civil parish in 2011 was 1,255.

For parliamentary elections, Weobley is part of the electoral ward called Golden Cross and Weobley. The population of this ward taken at the 2011 census was 2,985.

== Transport ==
=== Rail ===
Weobley has never had a railway. The nearest station at Moorhampton was closed in 1962. The railhead since then has been Hereford, connected by the 461 bus.

=== Road ===
Weobley's link to the wider world is the B4230, which runs from Whitehill on the A4112 through the village to Moorhampton on the A480 and then to Byrford Common on the A438. The old turnpike road direct to Hereford is a country lane. Gadbridge Road (the continuation eastwards of the High Street) and a street off Hereford Road called Burton Wood both exit the village eastwards to a network of narrow country lanes leading to Dilwyn, Stretford and King's Pyon as well as to the satellite hamlet of Weobley Marsh.

=== Buses ===
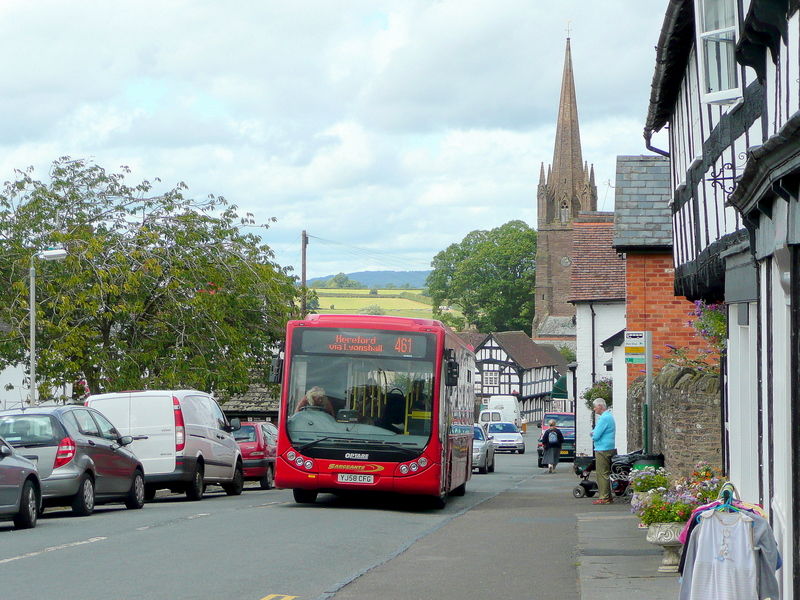
The Hereford bus at Weobley

The major bus route serving the village is the 461, operated by Sargents Brothers and with a daily service in 2021 of eleven buses each way from Hereford railway station to Kington. Some of these run through to Llandrindod Wells. The main bus stop in Weobley is in Broad Street. One each way of these buses is numbered 462, because it reaches Kington via Eardisley instead of directly.

The other route is the 507, operated by Lugg Valley Travel and giving a round trip to Leominster on Tuesdays and Fridays only. Unlike the 461, this serves Burtonwood as well as Broad Street.

== Places of worship ==
=== Anglican ===
==== Overview ====
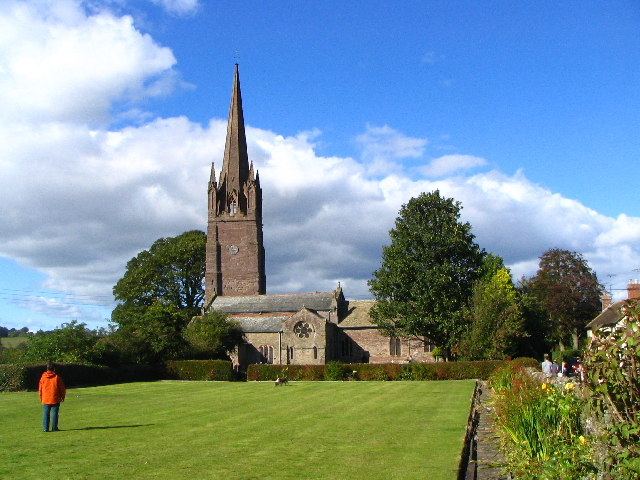
Church of SS Peter and Paul, Weobley

The village has an Anglican church, which is mostly 13th century but was restored in 1865: St Peter and St Paul's Church. This is now (2021) part of the “Weobley and Staunton Group of Parishes”, which is a team ministry including six other local churches and which is in the Diocese of Hereford.

==== Plan ====
The church has a nave with aisles of four bays, followed by a crossing with transepts. However, the transept arches are integral with the nave arcades and the nave roof is extended over the crossing. The nave, aisles, crossing and transepts form a unit which is almost square on the plan at 63 feet (19 metres) deep and 61.25 feet (18.67 metres) wide. There follows a very deep but unaisled chancel, almost as deep as the nave and crossing combined at 54 feet (16 metres). A vestry abuts this on the north side. The south aisle has an external porch. An oversized tower with spire is attached at an angle to the north-west corner of the north aisle, and intrudes into it.

==== Exterior ====
The present building replaced an earlier Norman one, and has a re-set Norman south doorway within the porch. It is not entirely certain that this came from a building on the same site; also, nothing is known of the small monastery of Augustinian canons from Llanthony Priory which briefly existed at the start of the 12th century. The extant fabric is otherwise mostly 13th century, and is made up of local sandstone ashlars and rubble. The north aisle walls and east window are, however, of the mid 15th century and are in the Perpendicular style. The roofing is partly in matching stone slabs, and partly in slate. The nave has a low clerestory, and before the 1865 restoration cat-slide roof pitches covered nave and aisles in single slopes so hiding the clerestory.

The west front of the nave is all in ashlar stonework, in contrast with the rubble used elsewhere, and dates to around 1300. The doorway is embellished with two orders of ball flower, and above is a large four-light window in the Decorated Gothic style flanked by a pair of empty statue niches. The smaller window in the end of the north aisle, to the left, is in the Perpendicular style of about 1450 and was installed inside-out by mistake.

There are four other large windows in the main body of the church, and the fenestration is otherwise simple and rather sparse. The south transept has a hexagonal rose window of seven lights. The east wall has a five-light Perpendicular window with simple tracery and a pair of portrait busts as hood moulding stops (these are of the 1865 restoration). The north transept has a two-light window topped by a trefoil, and the north aisle has a four-light Perpendicular window of more ornate design than the east window.

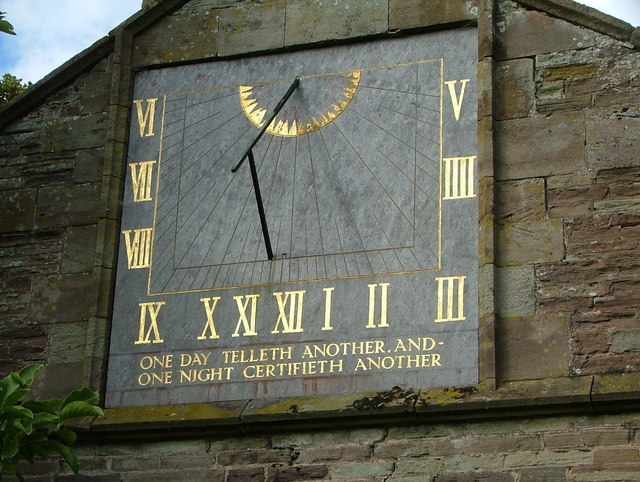
Weobley church sundial

The large south porch has a sundial over its portal. The actual door is decorated, and is dated 1712.

==== Tower ====
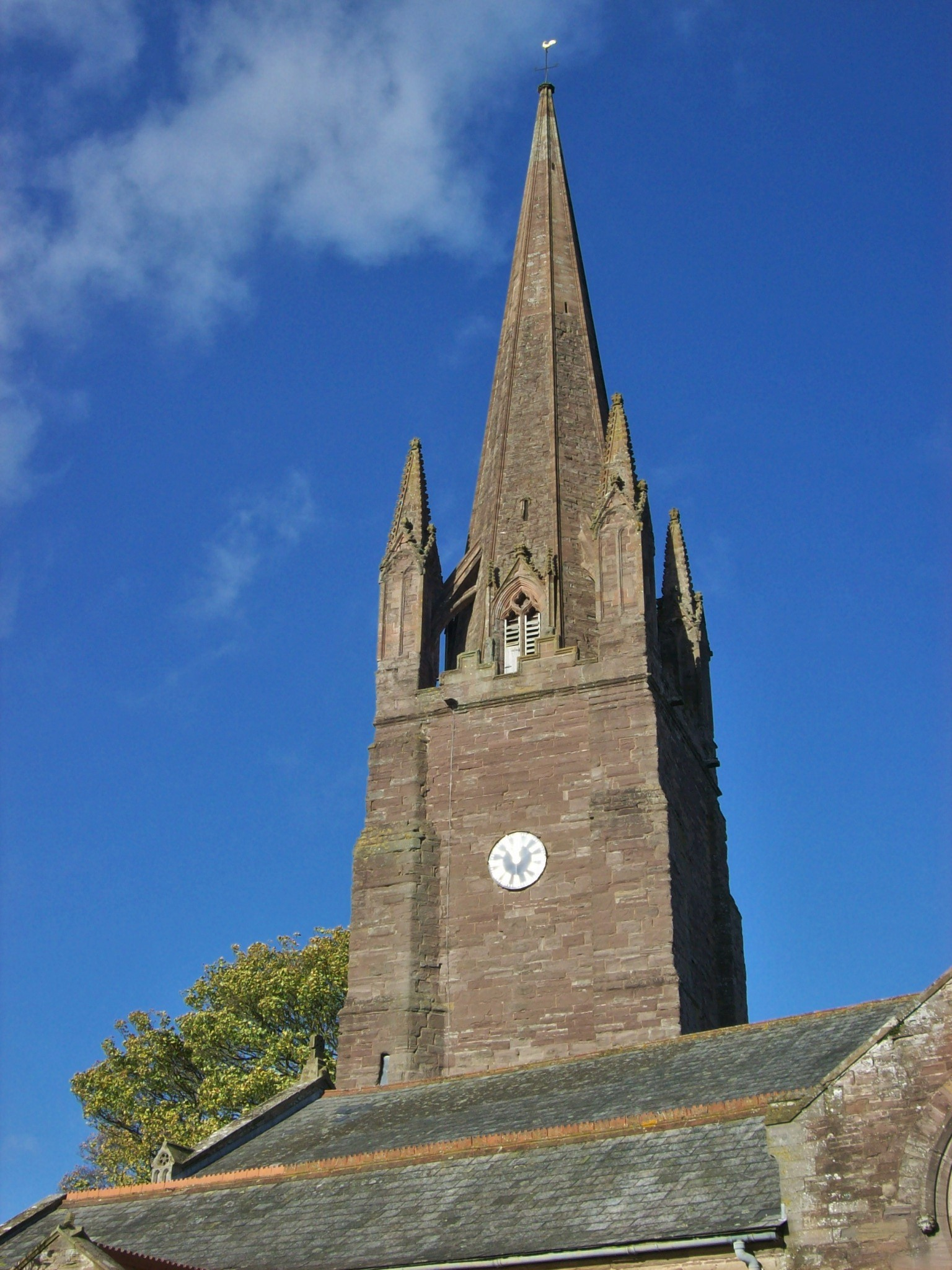
Weobley church tower

The oversized five-storey tower is very unusual. It was added to the north-west corner around 1330–40, with a spire that is the second-tallest in the county at 185 feet (56 metres). On the plan it is at an angle, which is odd and not easily explicable, and is thought to have doubled up as a fortified peel tower against Welsh raids. This is because the entrance doorway (off the north aisle) was fitted with a drawbar to enable people to barricade themselves inside.

The walls are blank, grim and virtually windowless, and each face is flanked with projecting wall strips meeting at diagonal stepped buttresses at the corners. The first storey has a recess containing blind three-light window tracery in its north, west and east walls -only the central light of these is glazed. The flanking lights used to contain small statues. The top of the tower has a set of four gabled and crocketed pinnacles apparently modelled on those of the tower of Hereford Cathedral. The south face has a clock.

The octagonal stone spire is not fully original, for it was struck by lightning in 1640 and rebuilt at a shorter height in 1675. It was only restored to its original form in 1898. It is supported by four flying buttresses, a feature unique in the country, and has the bell-chamber in its base which is also a singular feature.

==== Interior ====
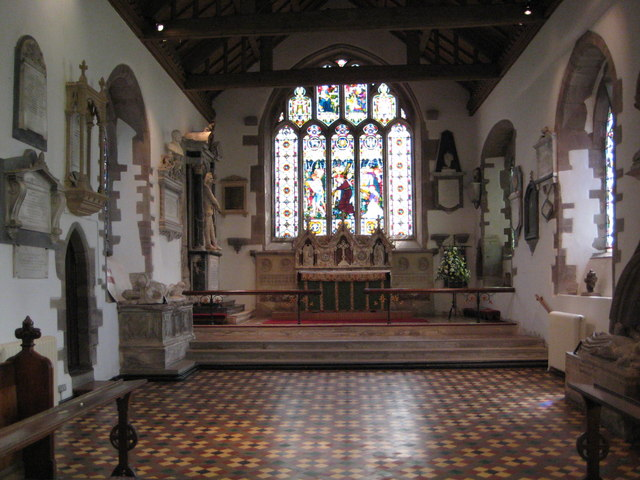
Weobley parish church, chancel

The mediaeval interior was vandalized by Puritan fanatics, who smashed the stained glass (some fragments survive), broke the piscina basins and mutilated the tomb effigies. The ambience mostly dates from the 1865 restoration, and has the whitewashed walls and octagonal arcade columns contrasting with the Victorian polychrome geometric tiled floor. The nave has a scissor truss roof. The Victorian stained glass is of good quality.

Some mediaeval sculptural work survives in the fabric. The south aisle at its west end has a row of corbels for a former 16th roof above the arcade, carved to depict a lion, an angel, an ape and a grotesque man. There is a late 13th century piscina in the chancel and one from earlier in that century in the south aisle; the latter is richly ornamented with dog-tooth.

The font is early 14th century, octagonal in limestone with window-tracery panels in shallow relief on each side of the bowl. The cover is c. 1700. Adjacent is one of the church's six bells, removed to here in 1983 because of worries about the tower's integrity. (These problems have become serious, leading to the church being put on the Heritage at Risk Register in 2017.) In the north transept is a fragment of the mediaeval wooden rood screen.

There are three mediaeval altar-tombs. That of Sir William Devereux (d. 1402) is against the south wall of the chancel, and has a badly defaced alabaster reclining effigy of him in armour c. 1430. He had married Agnes Crophull, heiress of Weobley Castle, and as a widow she married John Marbury (d. 1437). Their effigies, again in alabaster and mutilated with him in armour, are on their own tomb in an arched recess in the south side of the chancel, c. 1450. This tomb incorporates salvaged items from earlier work, notably two fragments of 13th century coffin lids with foliated crosses. In the north aisle is an anonymous tomb with no effigy, probably early 15th century.

In the south aisle is a tomb-slab is a tomb-slab carved with a foliated cross flaked by a mitre and crozier, with the inscription “Hic jacet Hugo Bssop”. This is a rebus, as the deceased was not a bishop but had the surname Bishop.

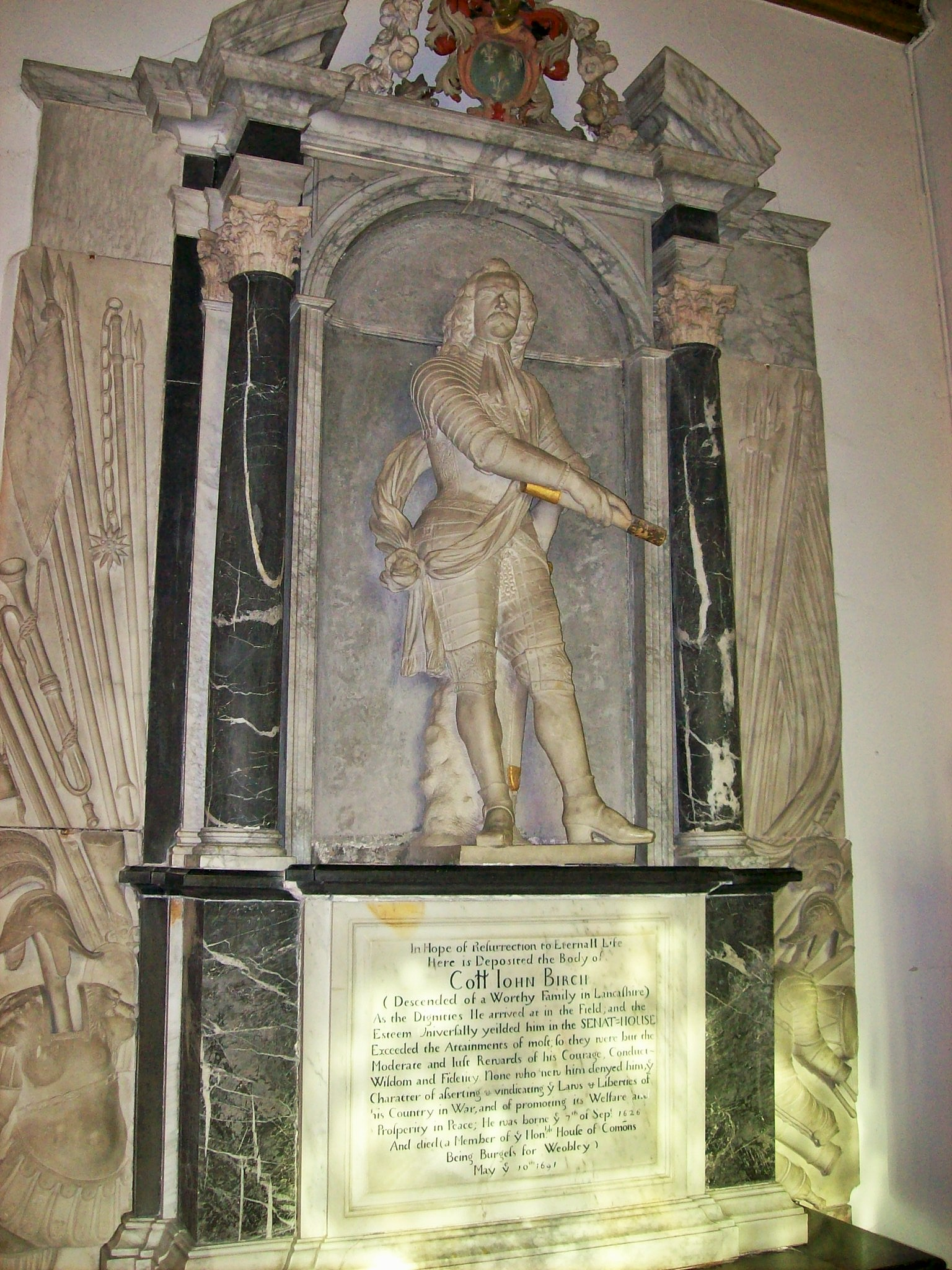
Colonel John Birch's tomb, St. Peter & St. Paul's Church, Weobley

On the chancel north wall is the spectacular Baroque monument commemorating Colonel John Birch (d. 1691). It has a pair of black marble Corinthian columns, standing on a high shallow plinth bearing his epitaph which is framed in the same marble. The columns support the ends of a broken segmental pediment, and in the gap of this is his heraldry carved in relief. The aedicule frames a statue of the deceased within a shallow round-headed niche in grey marble.

==== Churchyard cross ====
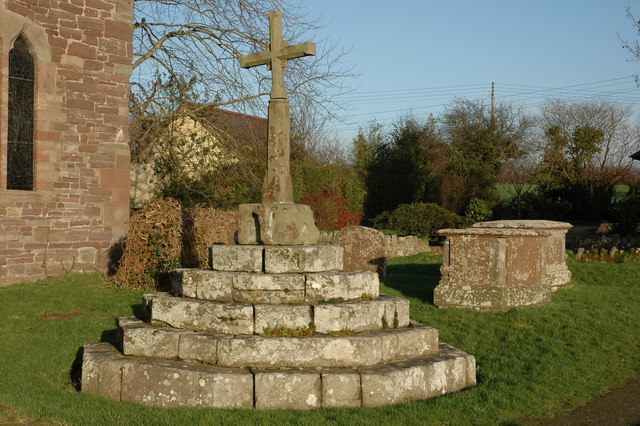
Weobley Churchyard Cross

In the churchyard just south of the chancel are the remains of a 14th-century churchyard cross, which comprise a scheduled monument. This has five octagonal steps, and a decorated socket stone. The shaft and cross-head are modern.

There is a legend that if you walk around the cross seven times at midnight while reciting the Lord's Prayer backwards, you will summon the Devil.

==== War memorial ====
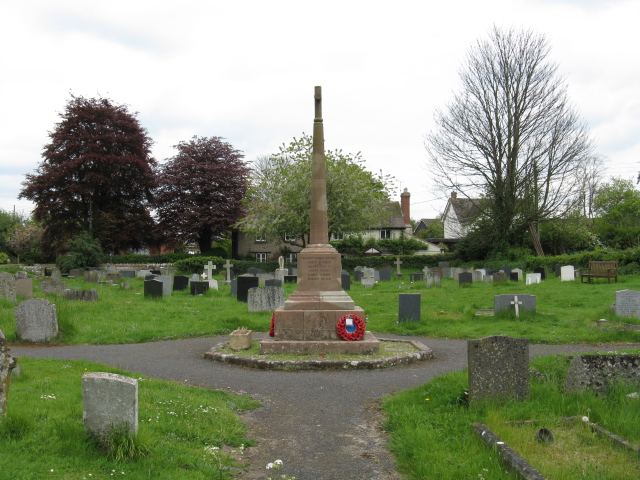
Weobley War Memorial

The village's war memorial is further south in the churchyard, and is a Grade II listed building. The material used is sandstone, and it was inaugurated in 1920. It is a cross with a tapering shaft, standing on a monolithic block with partly chamfered corners, itself standing on a stepped plinth. The names commemorated are carved into the block; there are eighteen from the First World War, and none from the Second World War because the village suffered no casualties – this is mentioned in the epigraph.

=== Roman Catholic ===
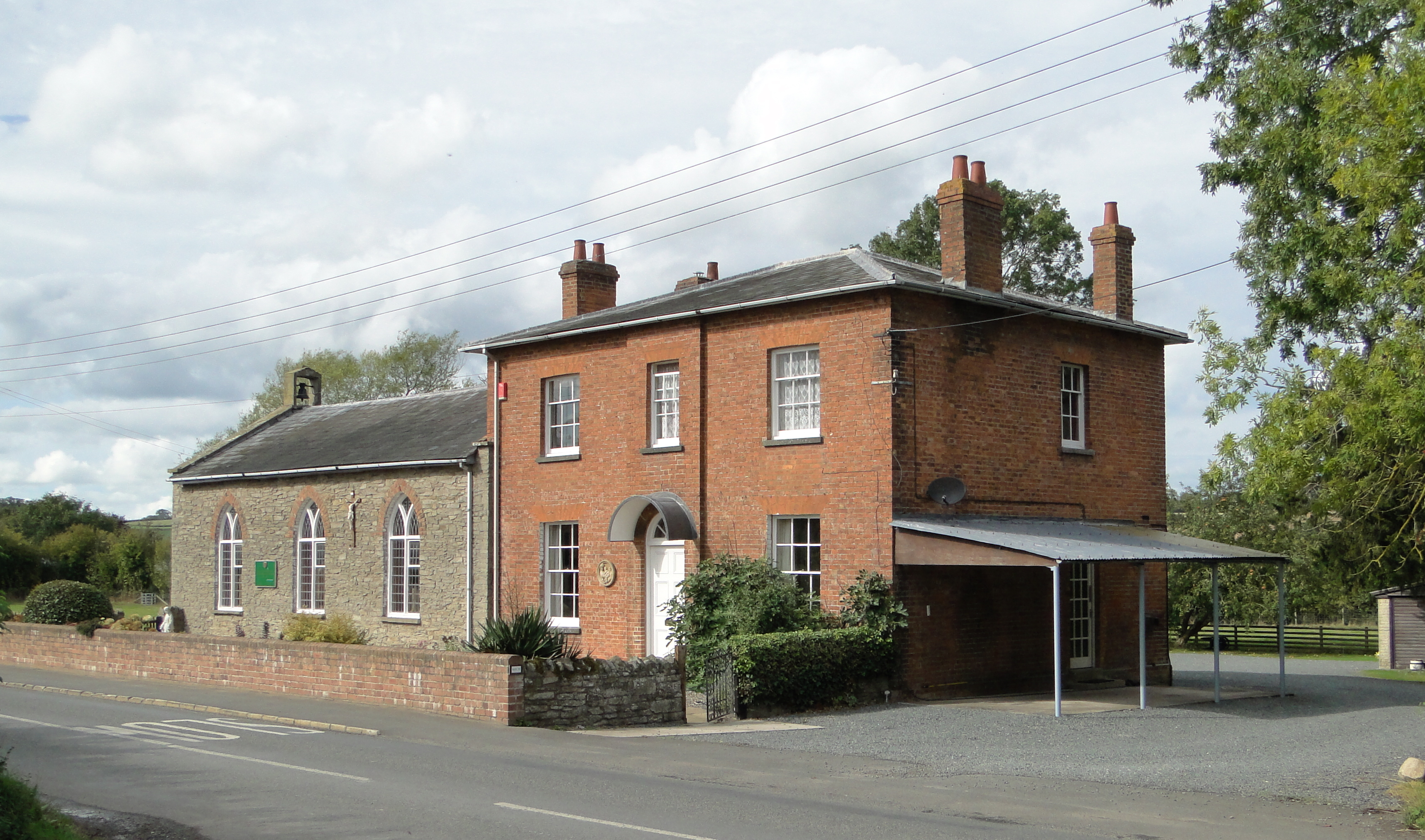
Weobley Catholic Church

Weobley's little Roman Catholic church is on the Kington Road outside the village, and is dedicated to St Thomas of Hereford.

When being a Catholic was illegal in England under the Penal Laws, Weobley was described as a “nest of Papists”. The recusant Monington family of Sarnesfield Court (demolished 1955) maintained a chapel in their house after the Reformation until Catholic emancipation in 1829, whereupon they decided to have a church built. It was erected in 1835, and is the oldest Roman Catholic church in Herefordshire as well as being a very early example of ecclesiastical Gothic Revival architecture.

The family put the church under the care of Downside Abbey, and several other local Catholic churches were founded from it. However, in 1923 the responsibility was transferred to the local Belmont Abbey, and in 1938 it was decided to consolidate the three churches at Weobley, Broxwood and Kington into the one parish of “Kington and Weobley”. Belmont Abbey is still in charge, and the parish priest resides at Weobley. The church of the Holy Family at Broxwood has been closed down and is now a private house; this was built in 1863, in an isolated and thinly populated location in the civil parish of Pembridge.

The church at Weobley is a very simple rectangular goth-box in sandstone rubble with a slate roof, having three bays and with a large two-light Gothic window for each bay in the south wall. These windows have brick headings, and wooden tracery. A similar but smaller west window is over the small gabled external porch (added in the 20th century), and on the roof gable above is a simple bell-cote. The north wall is windowless, and abuts a small red brick annexe which is now the sacristy but used to be a schoolroom. The east end of the church abuts the presbytery, which is an attractive two-storey Regency-style house (higher than the church) in bright red brick with a symmetrical frontage and a floating semi-cylindrical door canopy over a fanlight. The ensemble is Grade II listed, as one building.

The small interior has pink walls and a shallowly vaulted white plaster ceiling. The wooden altar, reredos and statues of the Sacred Heart and St Thomas of Hereford are by the Hereford woodcarver Charles Victor Gertner. The angels in front of the supports of the west gallery are salvage from Belmont Abbey church.

=== Methodist ===
A Primitive Methodist congregation gathered at Weobley in 1839, and built a chapel in 1844. This they rebuilt, and the present structure opened in 1861. The chapel is now (2021) part of the Shropshire and Marches Methodist Circuit.

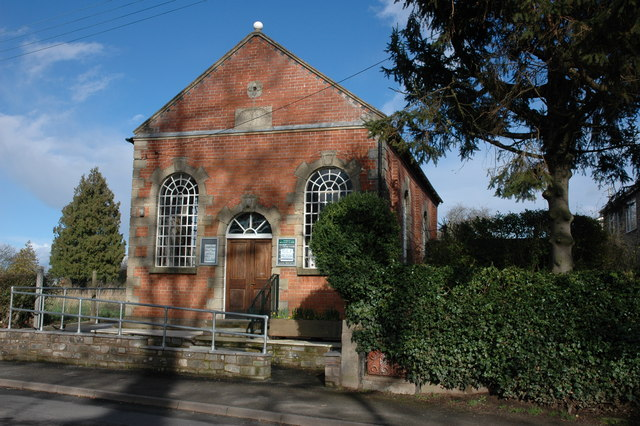
Methodist Chapel.

This is a small rectangular edifice in red brick, with two large round-headed windows in each side wall separated by shallow brick pilasters. Ancillary accommodation abuts the back. The façade has a pair of windows in the same style, flanking a round-headed doorway with fanlight. The windows and the doorway are lined with ashlar stone blocks in long-and-short work, and the building's corners are provided with rectangular quoins set so as to give the same effect. The keystones of the doorway and windows of the façade are each embellished with an axe-head motif in sunk relief. There is a stone string course creating a false pediment. A stone dedicatory tablet with a shallowly rounded top sits on this string course.

== Schools ==
The village has two schools, Weobley High School and Weobley Primary School. They are situated next to each other on the south side of the street called Burton Wood.

The primary school has its antecedents in a Free Grammar School for local boys in 1653, founded as a result of a legacy left by Willian Crowther in 1863. This existed in a surviving timber-framed building in Hereford Road until it merged with a National School founded for both sexes in 1834. The combined school established itself in premises in Portland Street in 1873, now the village's convenience store.

Weobley High School was built in response to the growth in the size of the village in the later 20th century, and opened in 1963 as Weobley County Secondary School. New premises were built for the primary school just to the east of this, and opened in 1998. These feature a pioneering “environmentally friendly” system of heating, powered by a boiler fuelled with wood chips and having wall insulation made from recycled newspapers. The system also serves the High School next door, with the latter's old oil-fired system being kept in reserve.

== Sport ==
=== Bowls ===
Bowls has a long history in Weobley. There was a bowling green on the site of the castle in 1824, but the present Weobley and District Bowling Club (which plays flat green) was founded in 1947. The first green was on Church Road, behind the (now closed down) Red Lion inn. The club moved to its present green on Hereford Road in 2010.

=== Football ===
Weobley Football Club was founded in 1990, and played in the Herefordshire Football League. It was wound up in September 2019 owing to the amateur playing squad having commitment issues.

=== Cricket ===
Weobley Cricket Club amalgamated with the Burghill and Tillington Cricket Club in 2016; the resultant Burghill, Tillington and Weobley Cricket Club play in the Worcestershire County Cricket League at their ground at Tillington.

== Public amenities ==
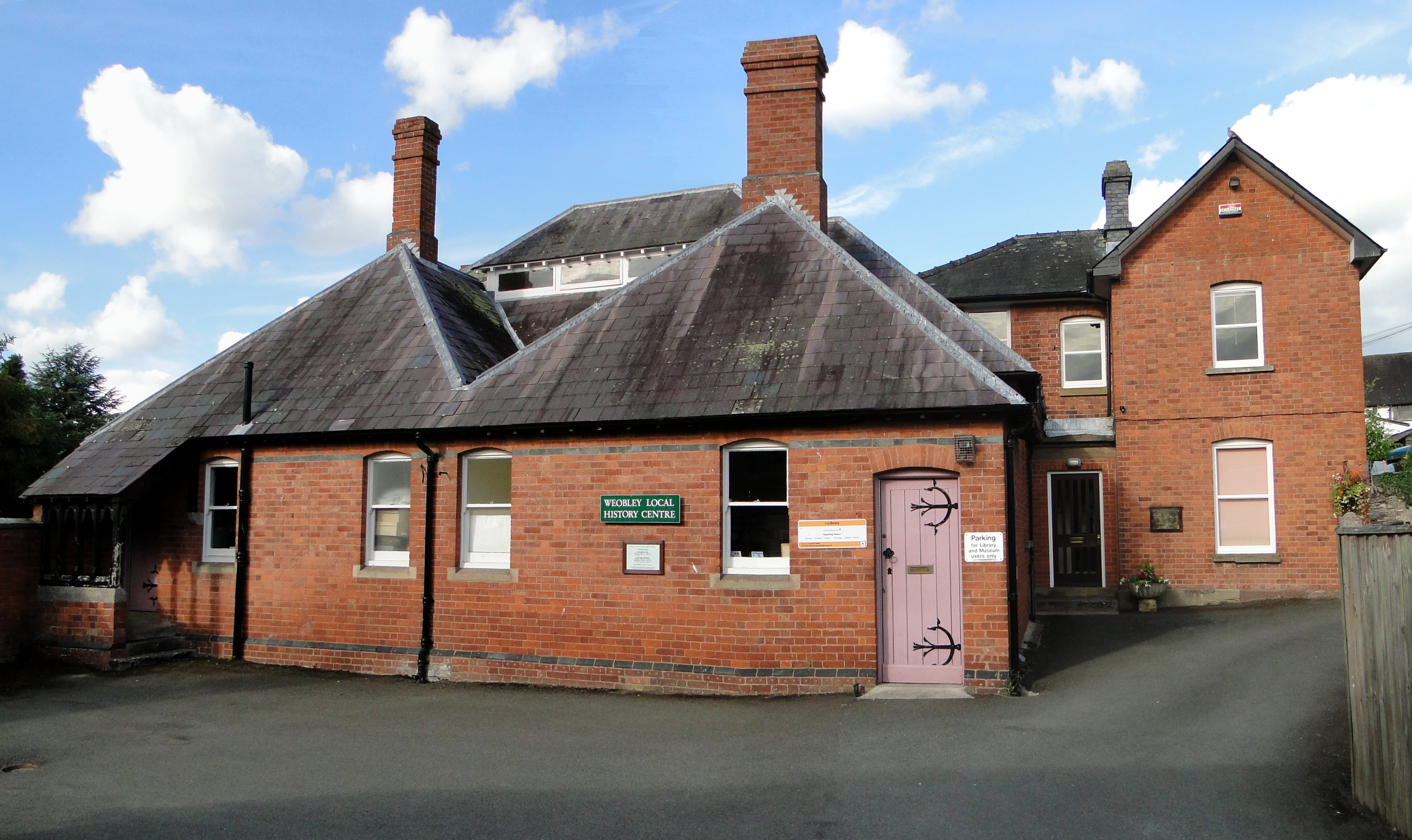
Weobley Museum

The village hall is on Gadbridge Road, and next to it is the play area, which has a skatepark. The Community Centre is a separate facility in Burton Gardens. The Weobley Museum and History Centre is in the former police station on Back Lane.

The village has a medical centre at the start of Gadbridge Road, comprising a GP surgery and a dental practice. The post office is on Portland Street. Lloyds Bank, on the corner of Broad Street and High Street, has closed down.

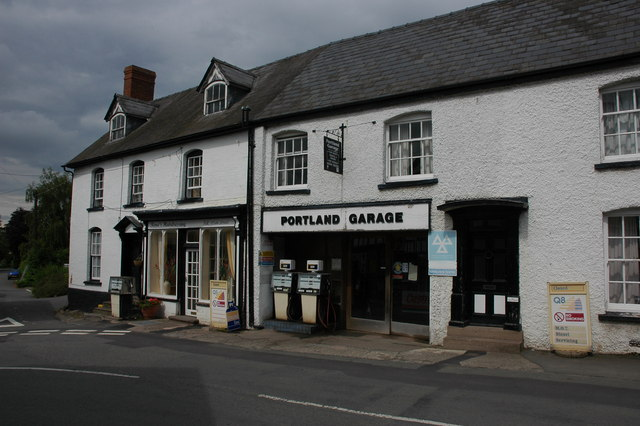
Portland Garage at Weobley

In 2021 there were also two long-established inns (The Unicorn and The Salutation), two restaurants (one used to be the former Red Lion inn), a tearoom, a convenience store (the Old School Shop, where the village school used to be ), a butcher's, a delicatessen with a café and a very small traditional filling station (Portland Garage).

A heritage trail has been laid out in the village, and there is also a Weobley Circular Walk which takes in the countryside to the south.

== Notable people ==
- Walter Devereux, 8th Baron Ferrers of Chartley (c. 1432–1485), nobleman and a loyal supporter of the House of York during the Wars of the Roses.
- Sir Thomas Tomkins (c. 1605–1674), politician, MP at various times between 1640 and 1674. He supported the Royalist cause
- Sir Herbert Perrott (c. 1617–1683), politician, MP at various times between 1659 and 1679.
- Richard Weston (1620–1681), judge, politician and MP for Weobley in 1660.
- Daniel Peploe Peploe (1829–1887), politician, MP for Herefordshire 1874 to 1880.
- Doris Turner (1908–1986), cricketer, bowler and umpire. She appeared in England's first four Women's Test cricket matches

== Listed buildings ==
=== Scheduled monuments ===
Weobley has three scheduled monuments: the castle earthworks, the mediaeval pottery on Windmill Knapp and the churchyard cross.

=== Grade I ===
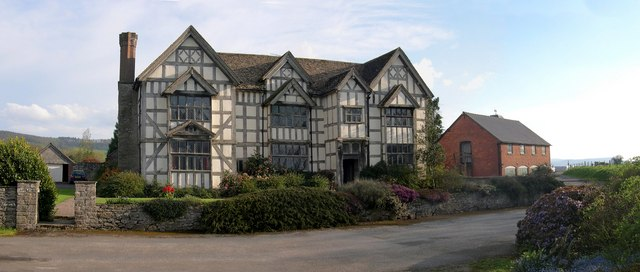
The Ley, Weobley

Weobley has two Grade I listed buildings: The parish church of SS Peter and Paul and The Ley. The latter is a farmhouse to the west of the village, and is a sumptuous two-storey timber-framed house on a H-plan, built in 1589 and little altered since.

=== Grade II* ===
Weobley has eleven buildings listed Grade II*; they are two-storey, and black-and-white timber box-framed, unless otherwise specified:

List of Grade II* Listed Buildings at Weobley
- 1 Bell Square (near junction with B4230). 15th century, L-shaped with hall-wing on street and cross-wing perpendicular to it with a jettied frontage. The former was given a brick extension in the 19th century, when two little shops were created here (long defunct).
- Marlbrook House, south end of Back Lane. 15th century, partly rebuilt 16th century, large and L-shaped; the cross-wing has a jetty, and the second storey of the hall-wing extends over a carriage portal.
- 4 Portland Street (listed as “Northern Half of Weobley Stores”, now called Queens Truss). 15th century fragment of a larger edifice. The frontage has two distinct zones, the left having a jetty but the right having a cavetto to the gutter with curved timbers. The former shop window has been replaced with cheap fenestration.
- Red Lion Inn (as was). 14th century, but the hall range on Bell Square was rebuilt in the 17th century and extended in the 18th. It has a sandstone rubble first storey frontage. The cross range on Church Road is original, and connects via a small 20th century link block to an outbuilding which has a cruck frame and which is a fragment of an originally larger structure. The ensemble is listed as one building, and in 2021 was occupied by a restaurant called Lal Bagh, meaning “Beloved Garden” (the original is in Bangalore).
- The Dairy Farm. On Meadow Street. 15th century with 17th century barn attached, L-shaped with a box-framed cross-wing having a jetty and a cruck-framed hall-wing. The chimney is modern.
- The Gables. Broad Street. 15th century gabled cross-wings; the central hall-wing was rebuilt in the 17th century and provided with a stone porch having columns in a vaguely Tuscan Doric style. The timbering is decoratively embellished.
- The Old Corner House. Corner of Broad Street and Bell Square, 15th century, L-shaped with a single-storey hall-range on the former and a jettied cross-range on the latter. The hall-range has a dormer window. In the 20th century was converted into a live-in shop (in 2021 a tea room), and for this the cross-range was extended by re-erecting a dismantled timber-framed barn from elsewhere.
- The Old Grammar School. Hereford Road. Purpose-built for Crowther's Grammar School, founded 1659. Symmetrical, with two large attic dormers and a bell-cote.
- The Old Manor, Bell Square (next to number 1). 14th century. Two tall jettied cross-wings of different widths, sandwiching a single-storey hall-wing.
- The Throne. Corner of Hereford Road and High Street, 16th century, main range on former extended in 18th century, cross-wing on latter extended in 17th century. King Charles II stayed here when it was the Unicorn Inn, hence the name.
- Unicorn House. High Street, adjacent to Unicorn Inn to west. 14th century. Complex frontage, partly jettied and partly with cavetto cornicing (some of this was removed to insert a window).

=== Grade II ===
Weobley has seventy-six buildings listed Grade II. Some of these are on farms outside the village:

List of Grade II Listed Buildings at Weobley
- 1&2 High Street. 17th century. Two semi-detached houses, timber box-framed with the first storey cased in whitewashed brick and the second in black-and-white.
- 2 Portland Street. Early 19th century, whitewashed brick with slate roof and a symmetrical frontage.
- 3 Broad Street. Early 17th century, timber box-frame, black-and-white, perpendicular to the street with a gabled frontage.
- 3 Hereford Road. Late 18th century, in whitewashed coursed sandstone rubble blocks (called Mayfield).
- 3 High Street. Early 18th century, in whitewashed brick. Altered for a shop in the early 19th century, hence the oriel window.
- 5 Broad Street. 17th century, timber box-frame, black-and-white (called April Cottage). Has a lean-to on left side. Abuts Little Croft (see below).
- Barn behind Unicorn Hotel. 16th century. Timber box-frame, weatherboarded, three bays with the eastern one 17th century.
- Barn at Brockaly. 17th century, timber box-frame clad in weatherboarding. This is on Riddox Lane which is north of Whitehill and some distance from the village, but is in the civil parish. Visible from lane.
- Barn at Fields End. Early 18th century, timber box-frame. Has threshing floor and possible horse gin. Farm is south of Garnstone Park, no public access.
- Barn behind The Gables, Broad Street. 17th century, timber box-frame, partly weatherboarded.
- Barn next to The Old Vicarage, Meadow Lane. 17th century, timber box-frame, black-and-white with some weatherboarding. Former “Recreation Rooms”, recently restored as dwelling (called Tithe Barn).
- Barn at Little Sarnesfield. 17th century, timber box-frame, corrugated roof. On north side of farmstead next to wood, visible from lane west of Whitehill off Kington Road.
- Barn next to 3 High Street. Early 18th century, in brick painted pale yellow on a sandstone rubble plinth.
- Bell House, Back Lane. 17th century, raised onto a rubble plinth early 19th century, timber box-frame with brick infill, black-and-white.
- Brockaly. 17th century, but altered and extended in 19th. Timber box-framed, black and white, three bays each with its own roof. This is a farm on Riddox Lane which is north of Whitehill and some distance from the village, but is in the civil parish. Barn also listed.
- Brook Cottage, Bell Square. Possibly 17th century, remodelled early 19th century. Brick faked up to look timber-framed in black-and-white. High rubble plinth with access ramp.
- Cart shed at Fields End. Mid 18th century. Coursed rubble with brick patching. Farm is south of Garnstone Park, no public access.
- Camberwell Cottage, Mill Bank (beyond the Corn Mill). 17th century. Timber box-framed, black and white, single storey but with two large gabled attic dormers which are mid 20th century.
- South Place, Castle Green Cottage and Stone Cottage. Hereford Road. 17th century, now three houses formed out of one timber box-framed edifice on a T-plan and clad in coursed sandstone rubble. Some black-and-white in north gable reveals hidden identity.
- Castle House, Hereford Road. Early 19th century, in high-quality coursed sandstone ashlar blocks. Windows have segmentally curved heads, and there is a wooden Tuscan Doric doorcase. Single-storey mid-19th century extension in matching style used to be the village's registry office.
- Castle View, Hereford Road. Around 1700. Timber box-framed, black-and-white. Perpendicular to the street; the facing gable end used to be jettied but had a first storey rubble wall inserted in the early 19th century.
- Catholic Church with presbytery. 1834.
- Churchyard Cross. Also listed as a Scheduled Ancient Monument, but the Grade II listing includes the shaft and cross-head which are 19th century.
- Corner House, Market Pitch. 16th century. Timber box-framed, black-and-“white” (actually pale yellow). Jettied, entrance in east gable end.
- Cowhouse at Field End. Early 18th century. Timber box-framed with weatherboarding. Farm is south of Garnstone Park, no public access.
- Dairy at Fields End. Early 19th century, brick with pyramidal slate roof having a louvre ditto. Two Gothic windows in frontage. Slate shelving inside. Farm is south of Garnstone Park, no public access.
- Fair Lawn, Hereford Road. Early 18th century, a large house in red brick and perpendicular to the road. The garden front has a pediment with a lunette window. The street frontage is blank, with a bricked-up window below a blind oculus containing a heraldic crest featuring two chickens (?).
- Fenhampton. 17th century. Grand farmhouse to south-west of village. Timber box-framed, black-and-white but partly clad in sandstone rubble. Public footpath access.
- Fenmore, Meadow Street. 17th century, re-roofed and extended late 20th century. Timber box-framed, black-and-white, entrance at side.
- Fields End. Mid 18th century. Farmhouse in coursed rubble. Outbuildings are separately listed. Farm is south of Garnstone Park, no public access.
- High House (listed as High Towers), Meadow Street. 17th century. Tall, timber box-framed, black-and-white, gable frontage has attic windows and an entrance lean-to occupying the entire width under a single-pitched roof.
- Holmleigh, High Street (near the surgery). 17th century. Timber-framed, but refaced in the 18th century and the framing is only visible in the right hand side. Single storey, but with two attic dormer windows flanking a central gable also with an attic window. The frontage is all in white.
- Homeleigh, Broad Street (west side). Late 17th century. Brick, roughly rendered in white. Has two attic dormers, and a wooden doorcase enclosing an overlight.
- The Green Bean (listed as Jeans Fashions), Broad Street. Late 17th century, timber box-framed, perpendicular to street. Black-and-white on north side. A separate parallel range was added on the south side in the 19th century, and the frontage re-done in whitewashed brick to provide two shops. One of these used to be the first premises of Lloyds Bank in the village.
- Jules Café, Portland Street. 17th century, timber box-framed but mostly re-cast in rough whitewashed brick in early 18th century; some black-and-white visible in back range.
- Little Croft, Broad Street. 17th century, timber box-framed partly in black-and-white but substantially altered in 19th century and had a garage inserted into a carriage entrance in the 20th. There are two bay windows running the full height, obvious additions.
- Little Sarnsfield. Farmhouse off A 4112, west of Whitehill. 14th century, remodelled in 17th and 18th centuries. Timber box-framed, mostly clad in brick. No public access.
- London House (listed as Lloyds Bank). Corner of High Street and Broad Street. Early 17th century, timber box-framed in black-and-white. Used to be the village's bank, in 2021 was a hairdressers'.
- Market Pitch Cottage. 16th century, with 17th century single-storey annexe slightly forward. Timber box-framed, black-and-white. The main range used to have a jetty, but the lower frontage was aligned with the upper in the 18th century.
- May Cottage and Ella's Cottage (listed as May Cottage), Bell Square. 17th century, extended to east in late 18th century. Timber box-framed, black-and-white. Two houses in one building; the extension has the first storey in whitewashed brick.
- Mayfield, Hereford Road (east side). 17th century, re-fronted in whitewashed brick in 18th century. Timber box-framed, as can be seen in tip of north gable.
- Meadow Cottage, Meadow Street. 17th century. Timber box-framed, black-and-white. A quirky little house, possibly a fragment of a larger edifice (see left hand gable end).
- Mellington House, Broad Street. Late 17th century, as is an outbuilding to the right which is connected by a mid-19th century brick block. Timber box-framed both. The symmetrical main frontage is stuccoed, with architectural details in pale yellow including a decorative blind arch above the central entrance. The four attic dormers are 19th century. Outbuilding has carriage portal.
- Mile post on B4230, at the first bend north of the A480 near Devereux Wootton. Early 19th century, triangular with sloped top in painted cast iron. The latter reads “Weobley Parish”; the two sides, “To Weobley 2 ½ miles”, “To Hereford 10 miles”.
- Mile-post on B4230, at Shoals Bank. Early 19th century, triangular with sloped top in painted cast iron. The top reads “Weobley Parish”; the two sides, “To Weobley 1 ½ miles”, “To Hereford 11 miles”.
- Mile-post on Hereford Road, opposite East Lodge of Garnstone Park. Early 19th century, triangular with sloped top in painted cast iron. The top reads “Weobley Parish”; the two sides, “To Weobley ½ mile”, “To Hereford 10 miles”. Has a maker's mark: “Hereford Georges & Son Foundry”.
- Mill Bank Cottages. Early 19th century. A terrace of four millworkers’ cottages, in red brick with segmental tops to windows and doors. The frontage has an oblique angle to fit into a bend in the road.
- 1 Broad Street (listed as Number 1). 16th century, re-fronted in 18th century and altered in the mid 19th century when it was turned into a shop. Timber box-framed, only black-and-white at north gable whereas the frontage is in whitewashed brick. The entrance has a wooden doorcase sporting a triangular pediment with a broken cornice. The original shopfront survives. There is an outbuilding at the back, comprising stables.
- Portland Garage, Broad Street (listed as Number 2). Possibly 17th century timber box-framed, but encased in rough brick in the early 19th century. Converted into a small filling station in the mid 20th century, and as such is a rare survival.
- Orchard Bank, Mill Bank (just beyond Corn Mill). 17th century. Timber box-framed, black-and-white, single-storey but has a large attic dormer window.
- Outbuilding north of Fenmore, Meadow Street. 17th century. Timber box-framed, black-and-white but first storey to west and north is in brick and the gable street frontage brick infill is left naked. Possibly stables originally.
- Parkfields, Church Road (beyond the church). 17th century. Timber box-framed, black-and-white.
- Post Office. 17th century, but re-fronted in mid-18th century in whitewashed brick with two large bay windows. Timber box-framed, evidence only visible at top of north gable. Has arched side-passage.
- Williams Butchers (listed as R. E. Williams and Sons), Portland Street. 16th century, but re-fronted as a shop in the early 19th century. Timber box-framed, frontage is in rough whitewashed brick. The shop front is original. Abuts Tudor Cottage, separately listed even though under the same roof.
- Salutation Inn. Three distinct elements; early 18th century perpendicular to street, 19th century parallel to street and set back forming an L-plan with the previous, and a 16th century range to the west. The latter is timber box-framed, black-and-“white” -actually pale yellow. The newer ranges are in brick, in the same colour. The 18th century gable sports 16th or 17th century carved bargeboards, salvaged from elsewhere.
- 3 Portland Street (listed as “Southern Half of Weobley Stores”). Possibly 17th century, re-fronted early 19th century to make a shop and remodelled again early 21st century after the shop was closed down and the shop window and entrance were replaced with windows matching those in the second storey. Number 4 next door was also part of Weobley Stores, it is Grade II* listed and shares an old slate roof. Number 2 on the other side is in the same style but is not listed.
- St Columba's Cottage. High Street (east end). On a T-plan, the small 16th century roadside range abuts a larger 17th century extension behind. The former has a deep jetty, supported by a timber corner pier. Abuts Throne View, separately listed.
- Stables and Cider House at Fields End. Mid 18th century range, in sandstone rubble with ashlar dressings. Farm is south of Garnstone Park, no public access.
- Stawne, Meadow Street. Late 16th century, timber box-framed “black-and-white” except actually silver-and-pink (the timbers were never tarred)! Late 17th century, L-shaped with a chimney stack in the north range which has a rubble first storey wall and which was extended recently. Gabled street frontage is jettied.
- Terrace North of London House, Broad Street (listed as Terrace North of Lloyds Bank). 15th century. A terrace of three houses, timber box-framed and black-and-white. Has a deep jetty, and a shop front was inserted into this to convert the southern house into a shop in the mid 19th century (what is there now is mid 20th).
- The Bear and Urso House, 9&10 Broad Street. Early 18th century semi-detached house in brick rendered white, the northern dwelling having a carriage portal which is now a garage. There are four box dormers.
- The Birches. Farmhouse off the lane to Broxwood, beyond Whitehill. 16th century. Timber box-framed, black-and-white with some brick cladding, on a T-plan. No public access.
- Spring Cottage, Hereford Road (listed as The Cottage). Early 19th century. Bright red brick, with a gabled entrance canopy on wall brackets. Oddly, the south gable wall is in timber framing, black-and-white.
- The Cwm, Meadow Street. Probably 15th century, thought to be the cross-wing of a larger house. Timber box-framed, and black-and-white. Gable end abuts road, but access is via quite a long driveway.
- The Forge, Mill Bank. On a T-plan; the cross-range is 18th century to the north-east and possibly 16th century to the south-west. It is timber box-framed, black-and-white. The stem range, with the gable facing the road, is also 18th century and is in whitewashed brick. There is a lean-to shop entrance lobby in the right hand internal angle on the plan. This used to be a tea-room with gift shop here called “The Old Forge”, but the business is defunct.
- The Mill, Mill Bank. Mid-19th century. A four-storey corn mill, originally powered by steam. In red brick, with polychrome brickwork relieving arches over the windows and doors. Has been converted into apartments.
- The Old Vicarage, Meadow Street. 16th century. Timber box-framed, black-and-“white” (actually pale yellow). A main range at the back is fronted by two short wings, close together and with gable frontages on street. A chimney in rubble is inserted between these.
- Throne View, High Street (east end). 16th century. Timber box-framed, black-and-white with a jetty. Abuts St Columba's Cottage, separately listed.
- Troisdorf, Hereford Road (east side). 17th century. Timber box-framed, but re-fronted in brick in the 18th century -this is painted in pale yellow. Has an outside cellar entrance. Named after the city of Troisdorf in Germany.
- Tudor Cottage. 15th century. Timber box-framed, but re-fronted in brick in the 19th century. This is painted pale green. Sports a plaque “AD 1530”, which seems misleading. Abuts Williams Butchers, but is separately listed.
- Unicorn Inn. Late 17th century. Timber box-framed, black-and-white, tall with regular chequerboard framing visible. Has three gabled attic dormers.
- War Memorial. 1920, at churchyard.
- West Lodge, Garnstone Park. Up a track, formerly the driveway to the demolished mansion of Garnstone Castle, off the B4230. About 1809, Gothic features, probably by John Nash who designed the mansion. There is an East Lodge on Hereford Road, not listed. The ruin of an outbuilding is at the mansion site.
- Weobley Union Workhouse (listed as Whitehill House), on Kington Road. 1837 In red brick, on a double H-plan. Very little altered, although it is now private residences.
- Willow Cottage, Back Lane. 17th century. Timber box-framed, and black-and-white. Small, one-storey with attic windows in gables. Has a mismatched 20th century extension. The Pottery, just to the south, is another little black-and-white edifice but is not listed.

== Popular culture ==
Weobley was the site of the fictitious St Agnes lunatic asylum in Tatters of the King, a scenario for Call of Cthulhu. Large parts of the film Hamnet were filmed in the village.
