= Westmoor Flag railway station =

Former railway station in Herefordshire, England

Westmoor Flag

General information
- Location: West of Mansel Lacy, Herefordshire; England
- Coordinates: 52.1033°N 2.8620°W
- Grid reference: SO410453
- Platforms: 1

Other information
- Status: Disused

History
- Original company: Hereford, Hay and Brecon Railway
- Pre-grouping: Midland Railway
- Post-grouping: London, Midland and Scottish Railway

Key dates
- 30 June 1863: Opened
- 31 December 1962: line closed
Location

Westmoor Flag railway station was a private station to the west of Mansel Lacy, Herefordshire, England. The station was opened in 1863 and may have closed prior to the line closure in 1962.

Preceding station	Historical railways	Following station
Moorhampton; Line and station closed	London, Midland and Scottish Railway; Hereford, Hay and Brecon Railway	Credenhill; Line and station closed
