= Weobley Castle =

Weobley Castle may refer to:

- Weobley Castle, Herefordshire
- Weobley Castle, Gower

== See also ==
- Weoley Castle
