= Kinnersley railway station =

Former railway station in Herefordshire, England

Kinnersley
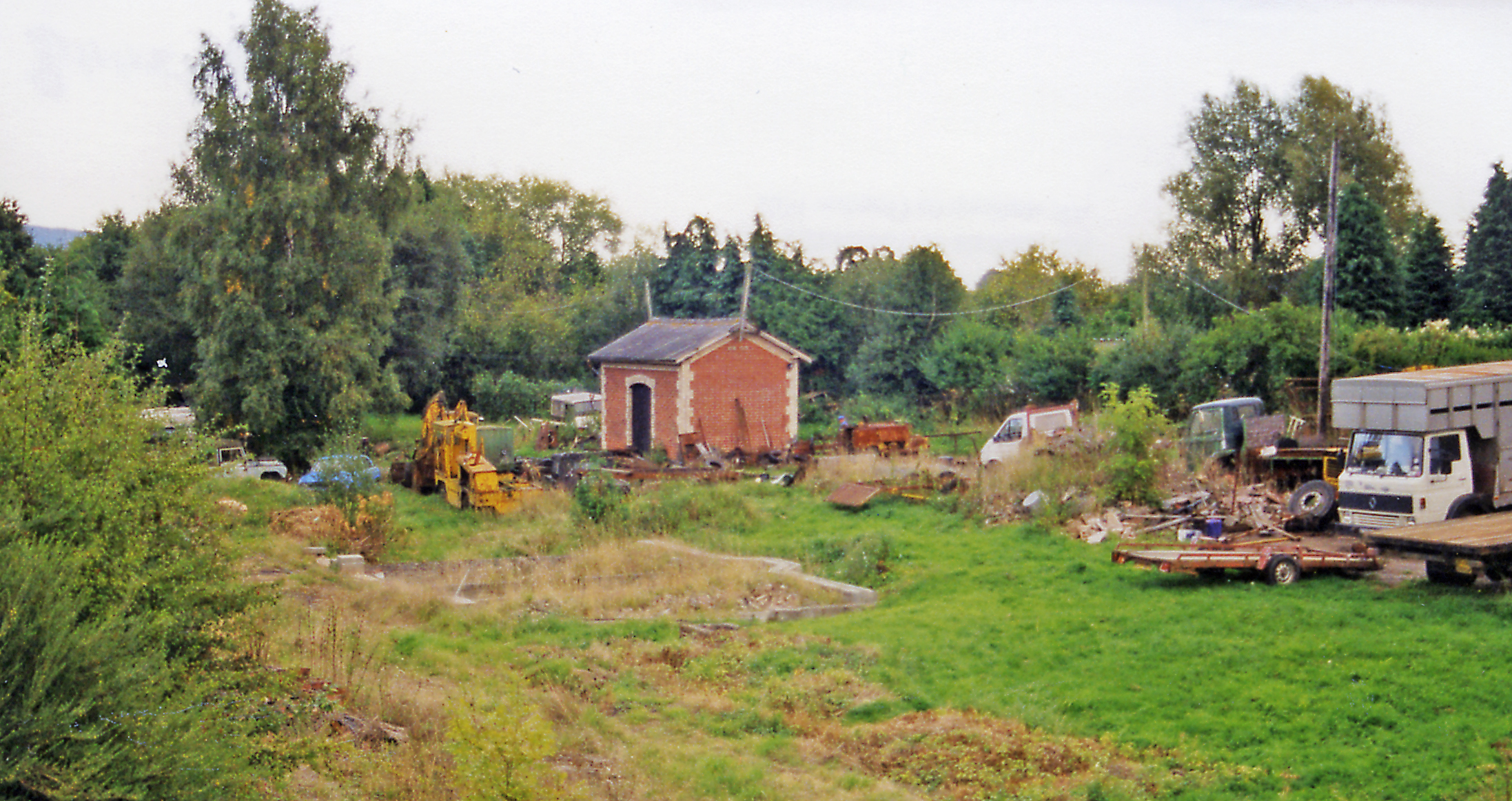
- Kinnersley station site in 1999

General information
- Location: Kinnersley, Herefordshire; England
- Coordinates: 52.1339°N 2.9638°W
- Grid reference: SO341488

Other information
- Status: Disused

History
- Original company: Hereford, Hay and Brecon Railway
- Pre-grouping: Midland Railway
- Post-grouping: London, Midland and Scottish Railway

Key dates
- 1 September 1863: Opened
- 31 December 1962: Closed
Location

Kinnersley railway station was a station in Kinnersley, Herefordshire, England. The station was opened in 1863 and closed in 1962. The station was located south of the village, next to the present day Kinnersley Arms public house.

Preceding station	Historical railways	Following station
Eardisley; Line and station closed	London, Midland and Scottish Railway; Hereford, Hay and Brecon Railway	Moorhampton; Line and station closed
