= Credenhill railway station =

Former railway station in Herefordshire, England

Credenhill
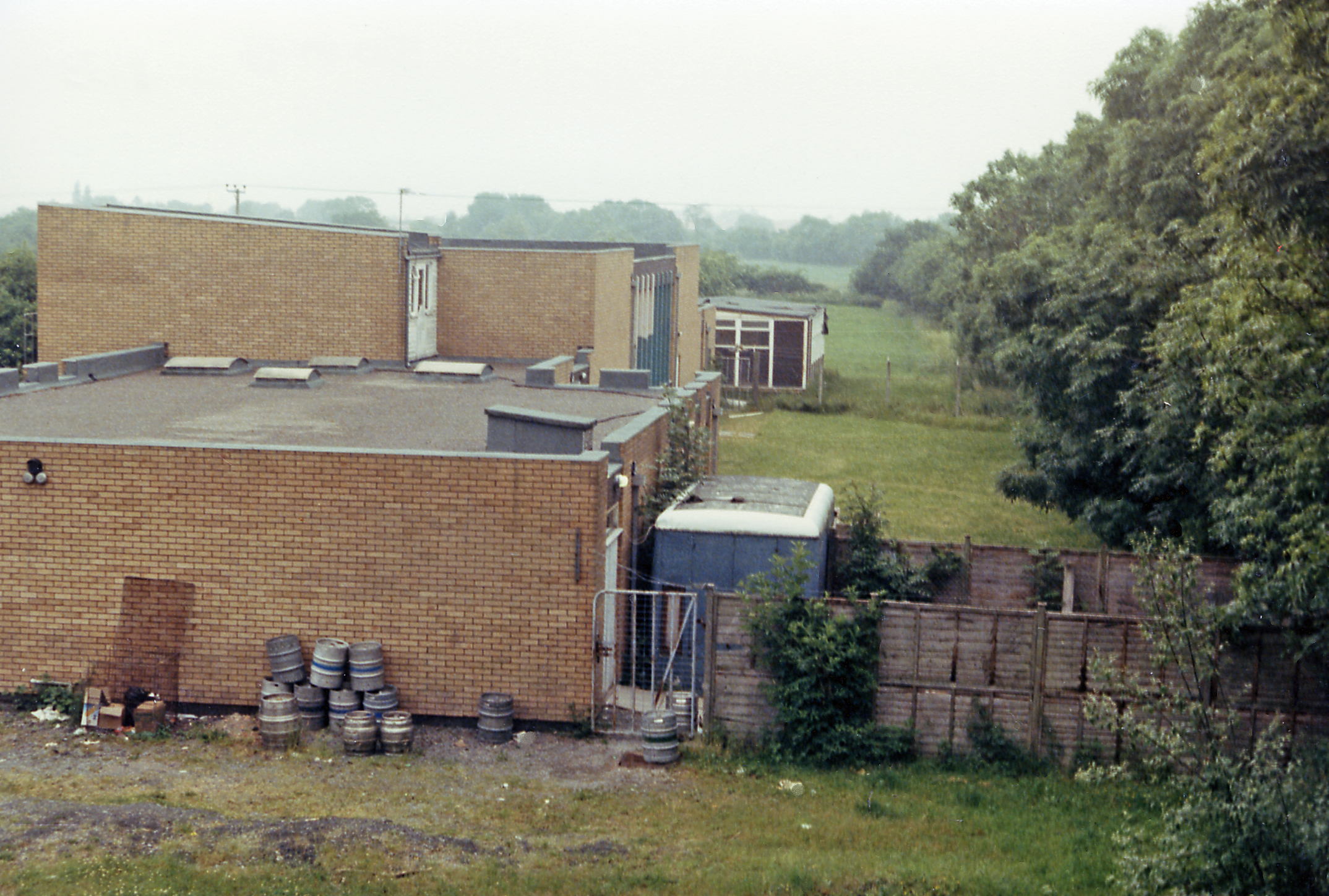
- Credenhill station site in 1986

General information
- Location: Credenhill, Herefordshire; England
- Coordinates: 52.0817°N 2.8102°W
- Grid reference: SO445428
- Platforms: 1

Other information
- Status: Disused

History
- Original company: Hereford, Hay and Brecon Railway
- Pre-grouping: Midland Railway
- Post-grouping: London, Midland and Scottish Railway

Key dates
- 30 June 1863: Opened
- 31 December 1962: Closed
Location

Credenhill railway station first opened on 30 June 1863 and finally closed by the Western Region of British Railways on 31 December 1962. The site is now used for Credenhill's Sports and Social Club, owned by the local council.

== Construction and early operations ==
The section of line between Hereford and Moorhampton opened for goods traffic on 24 October 1862, with the section to Eardisley following on 30 June 1863. Further extensions of the line reached Hay-on-Wye on 11 July 1864 and Three Cocks Junction on 1 September 1864. Passenger train service from the HH&BR's Moorfields station in Hereford to Eardisley commenced on 30 June 1863 and passenger traffic to Hay began on 11 July 1864. The line extension to Brecon was opened for goods traffic on 1 September 1864 and for passenger trains on 21 September 1864.

== Notes ==
Preceding station	Historical railways	Following station
Westmoor Flag; Line and station closed	London, Midland and Scottish Railway; Hereford, Hay and Brecon Railway	Hereford Barrs Court; Line closed, station open
Westmoor Flag; Line and station closed	London, Midland and Scottish Railway; Hereford, Hay and Brecon Railway	Hereford Moorfields; Line and station closed
