= Hereford Moorfields railway station =

Former railway station in Herefordshire, England

Hereford Moorfields

General information
- Location: Hereford, Herefordshire; England
- Coordinates: 52.058192°N 2.723967°W
- Grid reference: SO504402

Other information
- Status: Disused

History
- Original company: Hereford, Hay and Brecon Railway
- Pre-grouping: Midland Railway

Key dates
- 30 June 1863: Opened
- 1 April 1874: Closed
Location

Hereford Moorfields railway station was a railway station that served the Whitecross area of Hereford in Herefordshire, England. The station was opened in 1863 and closed in 1874. The station handled goods traffic from 1874 until 1979 and the Bulmer Railway Centre operated on the site from 1968 to the 1990s.

Preceding station	Historical railways	Following station
Credenhill; Line and station closed	London, Midland and Scottish Railway; Hereford, Hay and Brecon Railway	Hereford Barrs Court; Line closed
