= Mansel Lacy =

Village in Herefordshire, England

Coordinates: 52.095°N 2.840°W

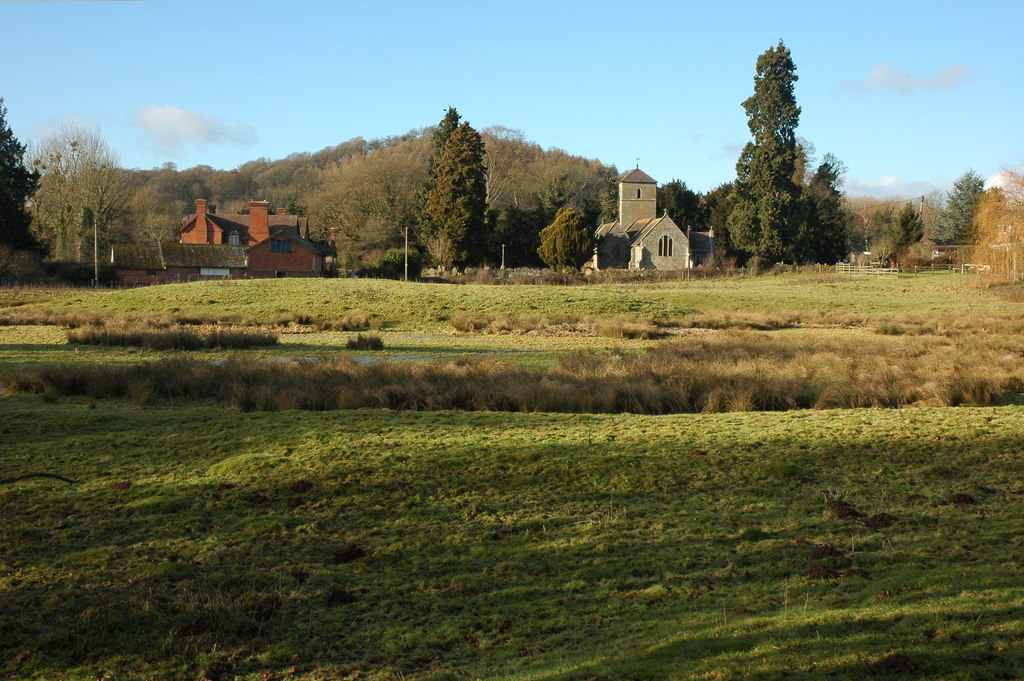
- From the east

- Location within Herefordshire
- Population: 139
- OS grid reference: SO425455
- Unitary authority: Herefordshire
- Ceremonial county: Herefordshire
- Region: West Midlands
- Country: England
- Sovereign state: United Kingdom
- Post town: HEREFORD
- Postcode district: HR4
- Dialling code: 01981
- Police: West Mercia
- Fire: Hereford and Worcester
- Ambulance: West Midlands
- UK Parliament: Hereford and South Herefordshire

Mansel Lacy (alternatively spelled Mansell Lacy) is a small village and civil parish in Herefordshire, England. It is 7 miles (11 km) north west of Hereford, close to the A480 road.

The population of the parish at the 2011 Census was 139.

Mansel Lacy was the overall winner of Herefordshire in the 2008 Calor Village of the Year competition.

== History ==
Mansel Lacy is mentioned in an Anglo-Saxon charter (Sawyer: 1469) from c. 1045, half a hide of which is bought as an estate. It appears as Mælueshylle, probably meaning 'hill on which the mallow grows' from Old English malu + hyll.

The village has two entries in the Domesday Book (1086) as Malveselle in the hundred of Stepleset. It is quite small with only 11 households yet is assessed for a relatively large amount of tax of 5 geld units.

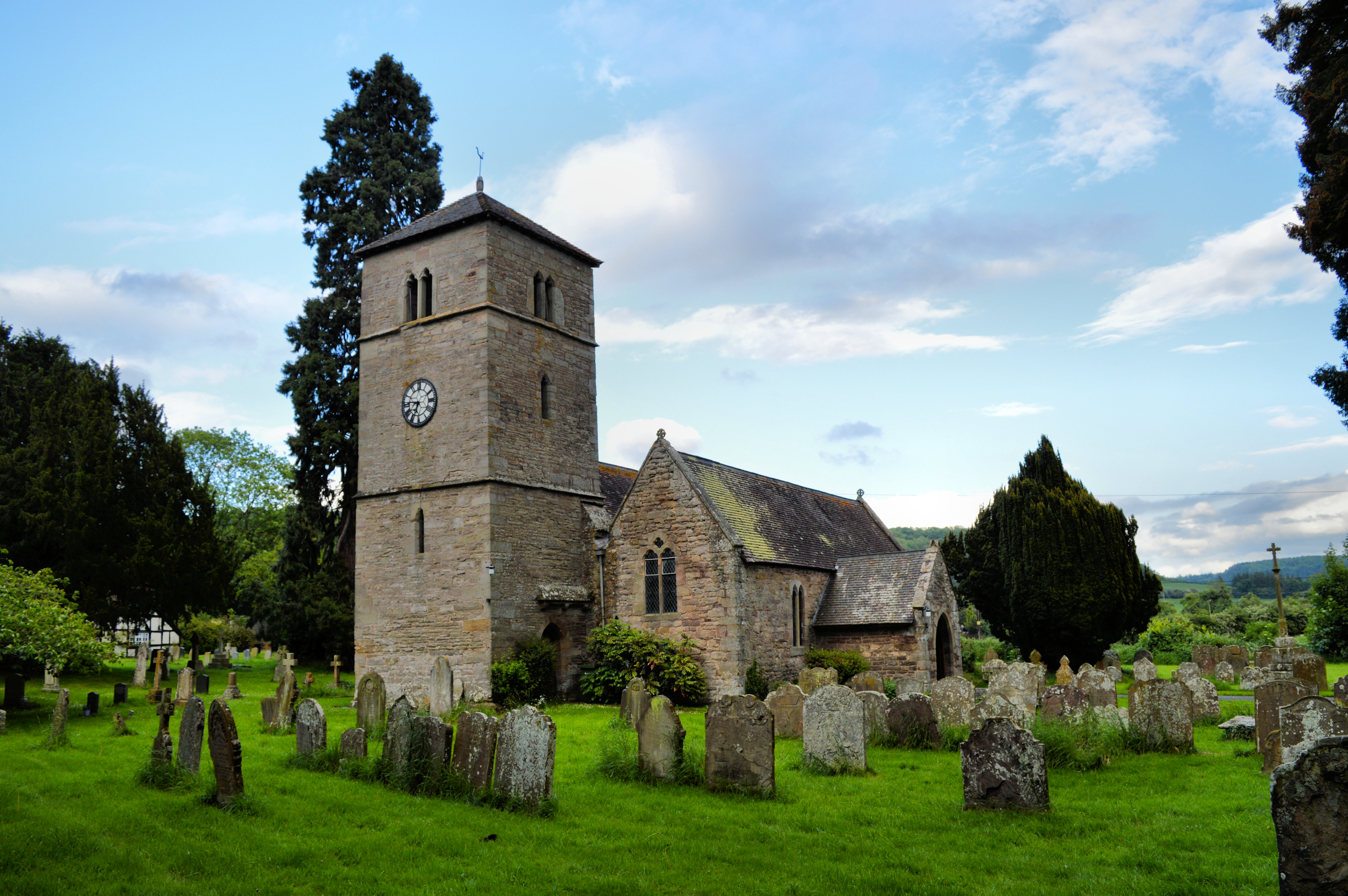
St Michael's

The church of St Michael and All Angels dates from between the 11th and 13th centuries.
