= Moorhampton railway station =

Former railway station in Herefordshire, England

Moorhampton
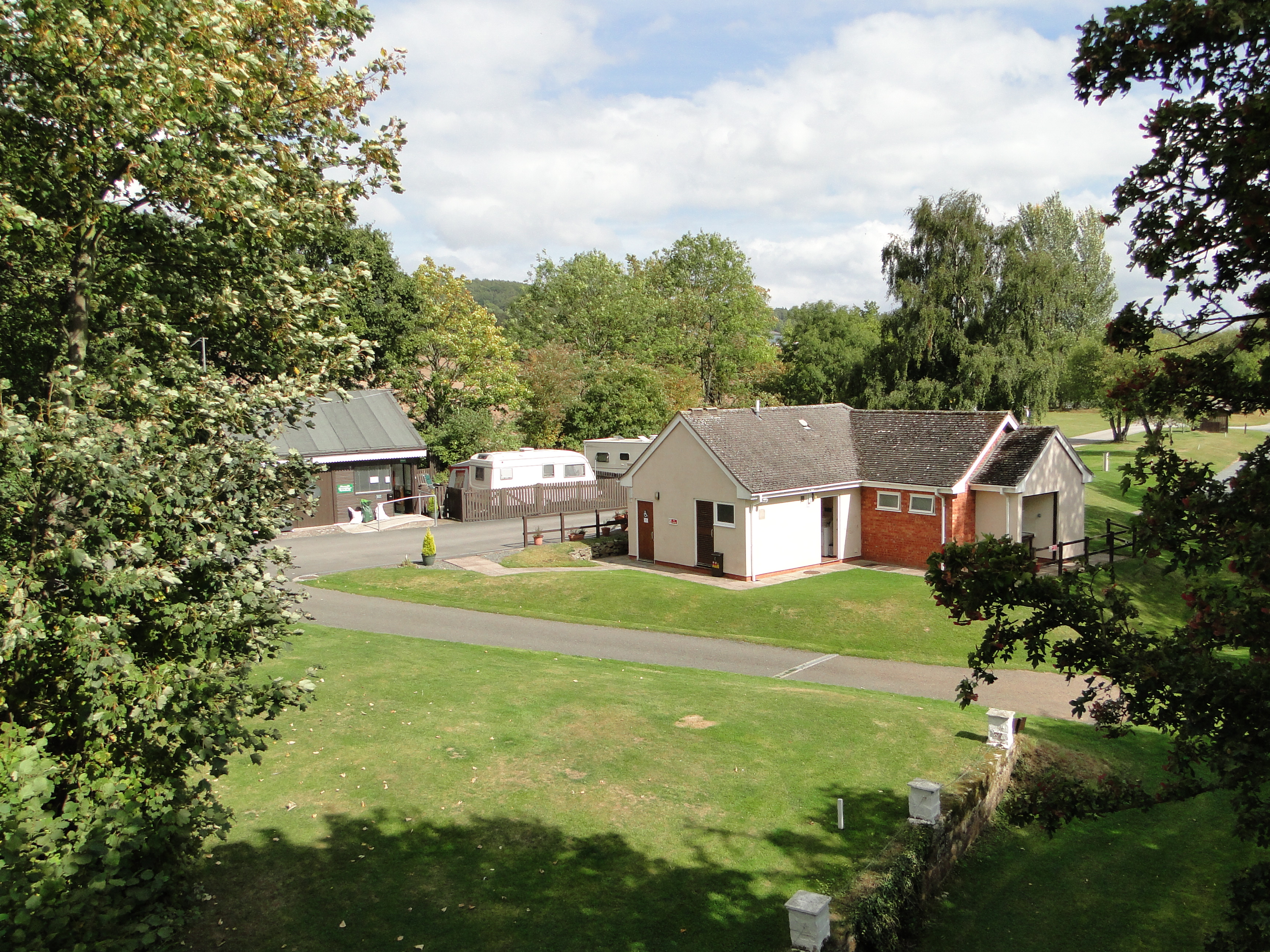
- The site of the station in 2011

General information
- Location: East of Norton Canon, Herefordshire; England
- Coordinates: 52.1169°N 2.8914°W
- Grid reference: SO390468

Other information
- Status: Disused

History
- Original company: Hereford, Hay and Brecon Railway
- Pre-grouping: Midland Railway
- Post-grouping: London, Midland and Scottish Railway

Key dates
- 24 October 1862: Opened for freight traffic
- 30 June 1863: opened for passengers
- 31 December 1962: Closed
Location

Moorhampton railway station was a station in the hamlet of Moorhampton, to the east of Norton Canon, Herefordshire, England. The station was opened for freight traffic on 24 October 1862 and closed on 31 December 1962. The station, now a caravan site, was on the B4230 Station Road.

| Preceding station | Historical railways | Following station |
|---|---|---|
| Kinnersley; Line and station closed | London, Midland and Scottish Railway; Hereford, Hay and Brecon Railway | Westmoor Flag; Line and station closed |
