= Hereford, Hay and Brecon Railway =

Railway in English

The Hereford, Hay and Brecon Railway (HH&BR) was a railway company that built a line between Hereford in England and a junction with the Mid-Wales Railway at Three Cocks Junction. It opened its line in stages from 1862 to 1864. It never had enough money to operate properly, but the Midland Railway saw it as a means of reaching Swansea, and from 1869 the Midland Railway was given exclusive running powers over the HH&BR. There was then a long-running dispute over whether the Midland inherited rights of access previously granted to the HH&BR.

Although the Midland used the route for goods access to and from Swansea, the line was never developed as a trunk route. As a rural line it failed to achieve commercial success and in 1962 the passenger service was withdrawn, followed by total closure in 1964.

== First a tramroad ==
Down to the end of the eighteenth century, the district around Hay-on-Wye (then simply referred to as Hay) relied for transport of goods, on the River Wye itself. Navigation was not easy, and unreliability of this means during dry spells or in midwinter made it unsatisfactory. The construction of the Brecknock and Abergavenny Canal provided an opportunity at Watton, some distance from Hay.

To reach it the Hay Railway was promoted, receiving its authorising act of Parliament, the Hay Railway Act 1811 (51 Geo. 3. c. cxxii), of 25 May 1811. A second act of Parliament, the Hay Railway Act 1812 (52 Geo. 3. c. cvi) of 20 May 1812, authorised a number of route changes. It was a plateway tramroad, to be worked by horses, and having L-section plates as the track on which plain wagon wheels could run; the gauge was 3 ft 6 in (1,067 mm) John Hodgkinson designed the route: in fact he proposed two alternatives, one of 26 miles without a tunnel, which would cost £50,375, and one of 24 miles with a tunnel, which would cost £52,744. The latter was selected. Its construction was completed from Brecon to Hay on 7 May 1816, and extended by stages to Eardisley by 1 December 1818.

== Now a railway ==
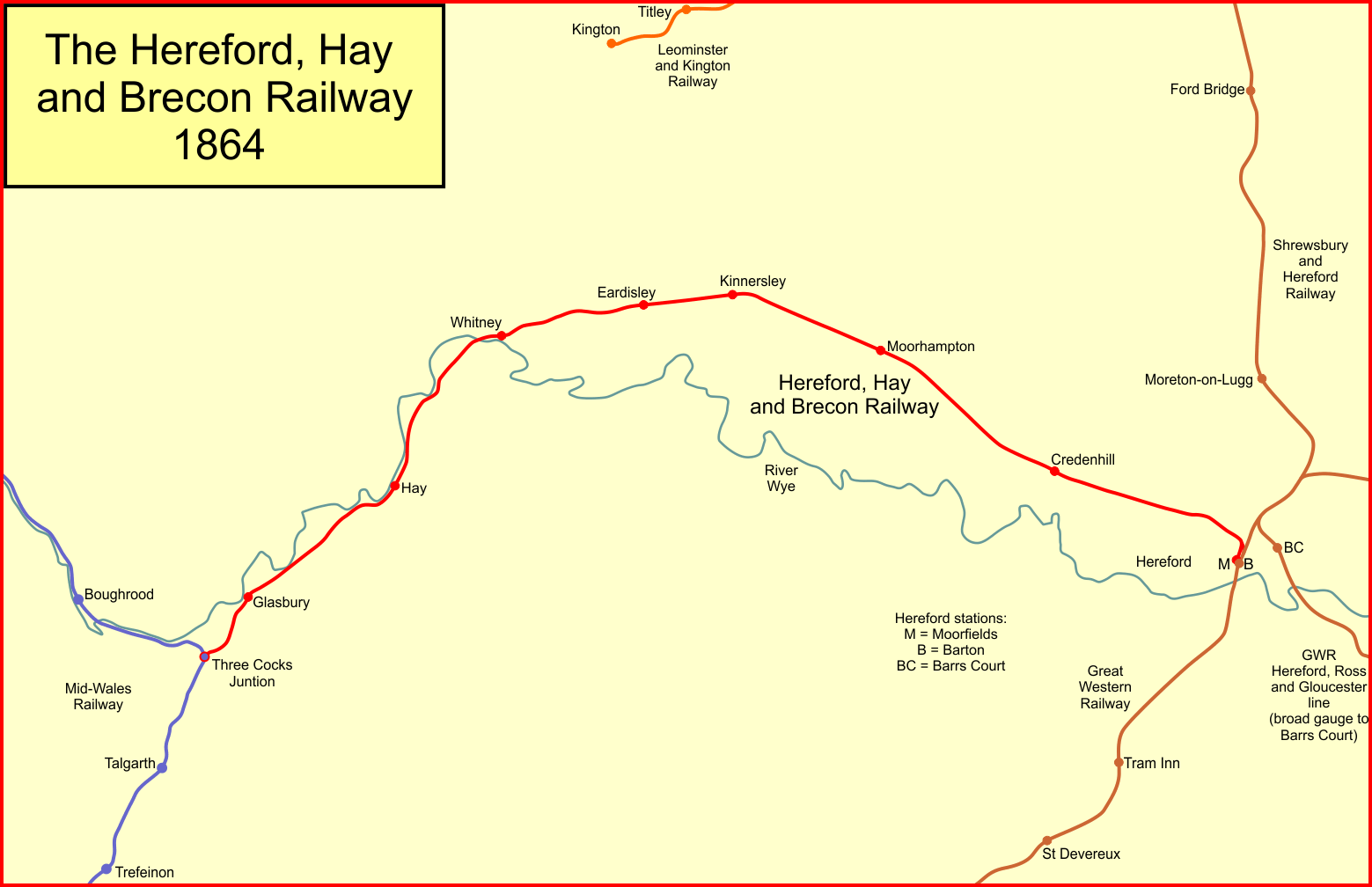
The Hereford, Hay and Brecon Railway in 1864

Notwithstanding the success of the tramroad, as railway technology developed it became apparent that towns served by a railway had an economic advantage over other places that were not so served. In August 1854 the Leominster, Hay and Brecon Railway was promoted, but it proved impossible to raise money for the scheme and it was dropped. Captain Walter Devereux returned to live at Tregoyd, near Glasbury. He found Breconshire backward, and at a public meeting in Hay on 12 November 1857 he launched the Hereford, Hay and Brecon Railway Company.

Hereford, Hay and Brecon Railway Act 1859
- Act of Parliament
- Parliament of the United Kingdom
- Long title: An Act for making a Railway from Brecon through Hay to the Line of the Shrewsbury and Hereford Railway Company at Hereford.
- Citation: 22 & 23 Vict. c. lxxxiv

Dates
- Royal assent: 8 August 1859

Devereux was keen to build a low-cost railway, but at another meeting in Brecon on 21 July 1858, those present adopted a proposed line via Bronllys terminating on the hillside north of Brecon. Devereux believed that his idea had been abandoned and he withdrew from the project. The Hereford, Hay and Brecon Railway received its act of incorporation, the Hereford, Hay and Brecon Railway Act 1859 (22 & 23 Vict. c. lxxxiv), on 8 August 1859; capital was to be £280,000 to build 34 miles 15 chains of railway.

A contract for the construction was let to M'Cormick and Holmes for £231,000, and a provisional working arrangement made with the Oxford, Worcester and Wolverhampton Railway and the Worcester and Hereford Railway to work the line for 45 per cent of gross receipts. The first sod was turned by Lady Tredegar near Brecon on 10 April 1860. However shareholders complained that too many of the directors were from London and were too distant. At a half-yearly meeting in February 1861, they refused to re-elect one of the London directors and substituted a local man. This resulted in serious disruption by the contractor who had close ties to the director, and the disruption was such that the company replaced the contractor by Thomas Savin.

Early in 1859 the HH&BR approached the Hay Railway, and agreement was reached on 6 November 1859, by which the Hay Railway would be purchased for £8,360. This was ratified by the Hay Railway Act 1860 (23 & 24 Vict. c. clxxix) on 6 August 1860, effective on 22 August 1860. At an early meeting of the shareholders, the line was described as being part of the shortest route from London to Milford Haven.

This gave the HH&BR a convenient way to get access to Brecon; the HH&BR, the Brecon and Merthyr Railway (B&MR) and the Neath and Brecon Railway were all interested, and they decided to buy it jointly and allocate it out in pieces among themselves. Thomas Savin actually made the purchase of the HH&BR part, receiving HH&BR shares for his outlay. The HH&BR went south as far as a location called Aberllynvy near Glasbury, and the junction station became known as Three Cocks Junction after an inn nearby. The end-on junction with the Mid-Wales Railway was 29 chains north of Three Cocks Junction station; the reason for this is that it was originally intended by the Mid-Wales to build a north curve, making a triangle at Three Cocks; the boundary between the two companies would have been at the north-east apex of the triangle.

The powers to build from Aberllynvy to Talyllyn were transferred to the Mid-Wales Railway, and the powers from there to Brecon were transferred to the Brecon and Merthyr Railway.

== Entry to Hereford ==
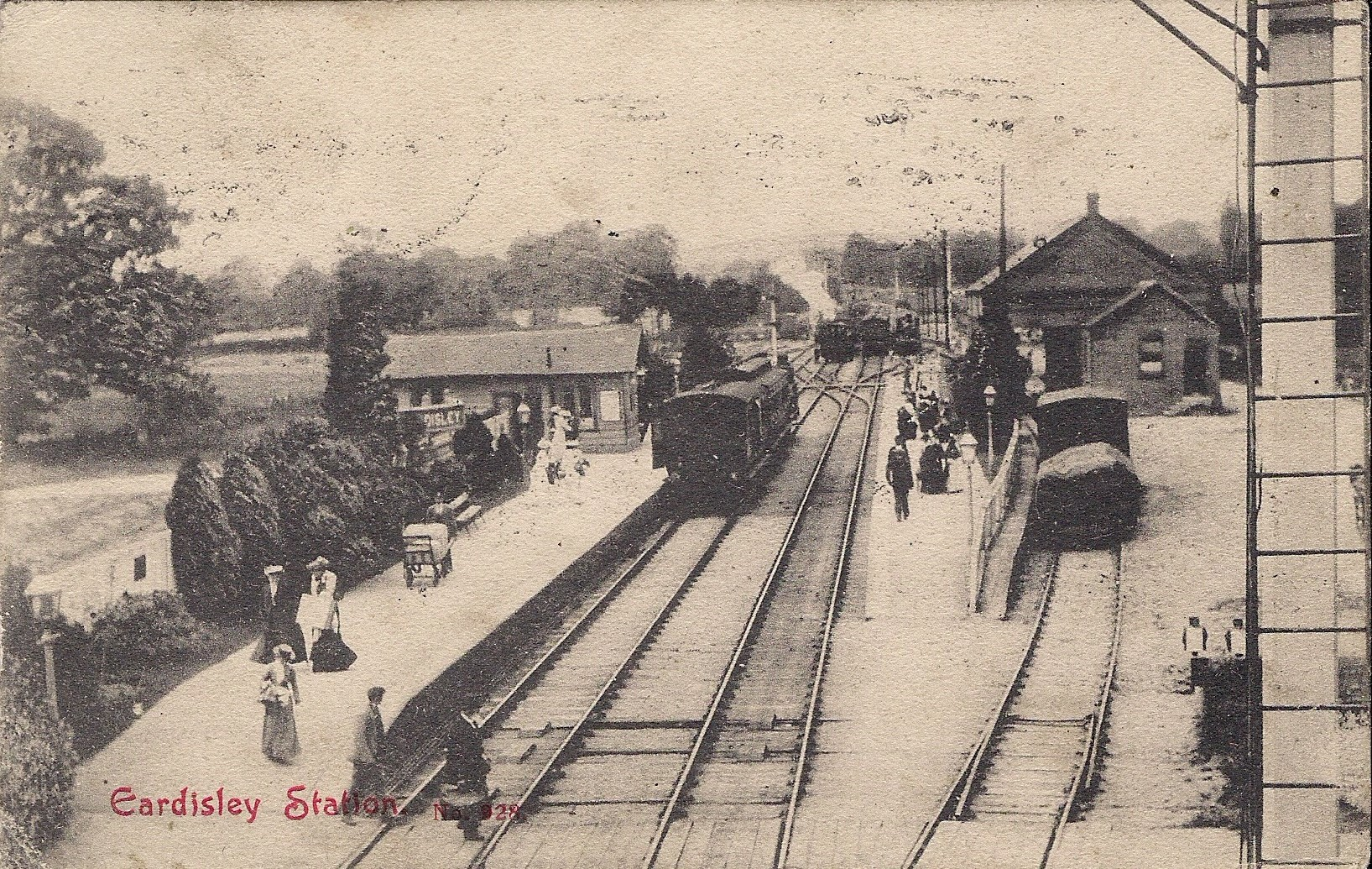
Eardisley railway station from an old postcard

The Hereford, Hay and Brecon Railway Act 1859 set out an entry to Hereford at Barrs Court Junction, facing north. The junction was where the Newport, Abergavenny and Hereford Railway (NA&HR), running via Barton station, converged with the Shrewsbury and Hereford Railway (S&HR), which ran from Barrs Court station, then a terminus, northwards. Barrs Court Junction would therefore have been a three-way convergence, and the junction was technically to be with the Shrewsbury and Hereford. Arriving HH&BR trains would reverse to either Barton or Barrs Court station, but there was to be a single-platform interchange station at the junction.

Hereford, Hay and Brecon Railway (Deviation) Act 1860
- Act of Parliament
- Parliament of the United Kingdom
- Long title: An Act to enable the Hereford, Hay, and Brecon Railway Company to relinquish the Junction of their Line with the Shrewsbury and Hereford Railway, and in substitution therefor to form a Junction with the Newport, Abergavenny, and Hereford Railway.
- Citation: 23 & 24 Vict. c. cxxvii

Dates
- Royal assent: 3 July 1860

This was obviously unsatisfactory and on 3 July 1860 the company was authorised by the Hereford, Hay and Brecon Railway (Deviation) Act 1860 (23 & 24 Vict. c. cxxvii) to abandon the S&HR connection, substituting a south-facing connection direct to Barton station of the NA&HR. The NA&HR, the Oxford, Worcester and Wolverhampton Railway and the Worcester and Hereford Railway amalgamated on 1 July 1860 to form the West Midland Railway. A new working arrangement was now made with the West Midland Railway: it would work the HH&BR line as soon as 20 miles of that line was completed and open. (Note: Clinker hints at a rift between the HH&BR and the S&HR at this time.)

== Opening ==
The first section to be opened was from Hereford to Moorhampton, opened for coal and lime traffic on 24 October 1862. An extension as far as Eardisley was opened on 30 June 1863, with a passenger service of four trains each way daily. The intention had been to use Barton as the Hereford terminus, and a connection into Barton had been used during the construction period by the contractor. However the Inspecting Officer of the Board of Trade declined to sanction the use of the contractor's connection for passengers, condemning it as "dangerous and almost impossible to work".

The line was further extended to Hay on 11 July 1864. Finally from 19 September 1864 the entire line was open and a train service of six passenger and two freight trains each way on weekdays between Hereford and Brecon was introduced, using running powers over the newly-opened Mid-Wales Railway between Three Cocks and Talyllyn, and from there the trains ran over the Brecon and Merthyr Railway to Brecon.

== Relations with the Great Western Railway ==
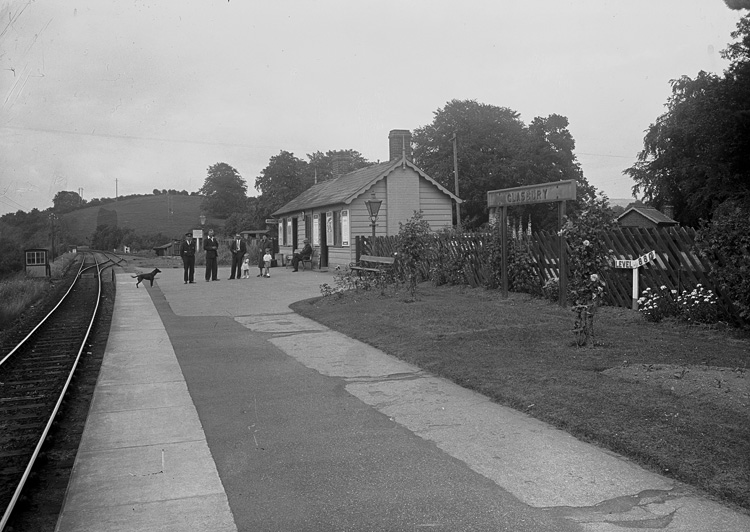
Glasbury railway station

At the time of the 1863 opening, it was obvious that the West Midland Railway was going to amalgamate with the Great Western Railway (GWR). It did so by the Great Western Railway (West Midland Amalgamation) Act 1863 (26 & 27 Vict. c. cxiii) of 1 August 1863. Hitherto the HH&BR had assumed that its partner companies at Hereford would have much to gain by using the HH&BR line for access to South Wales, but the considerable network of the GWR did not seem to offer that likelihood. A rapid cooling of relations followed immediately, with the issue of the junction at Barton unresolved.

In fact the GWR considered the HH&BR line worthy of developing as an ally, and the GWR General Manager, John Grierson, visited Hereford in November 1863 and agreed a compromise. A junction could be formed that did not directly cross the GWR (former NA&HR) line, but ran to the back (west side) of Barton station without making conflicting moves. An agreement was finalised on 24 August 1864, although many details were to be agreed later; nevertheless the first HH&BR train ran into Barton station on 1 October 1864. The agreement stipulated that the facilities granted to the HH&BR might be transferred to the Brecon and Merthyr Railway if required. The HH&BR and the B&MR were discussing an amalgamation at the time.

In 1864 the HH&BR deposited a parliamentary bill for curves at Barton; (Note: Wood refers to this as "the 1863 Bill" but he must mean "the Bill relating to the proposals, that was conceived in 1863".) one was to ease and regularise the curve to Barton itself; another was to curve to the north and run alongside the northward line to Barrs Court Junction; the curve was known as the Widemarsh Loop. At the same time the HH&BR petitioned against a GWR bill for the Hereford Loop, which would bring trains from Abergavenny across to the Barrs Court line in entering Hereford from the south. While these matters were in Parliament, the GWR, the London and North Western Railway (LNWR) (also interested in the Hereford Loop) and the HH&BR agreed that the LNWR and the GWR would construct a south curve, the Brecon Curve, near Barrs Court Junction, enabling through running from the Barton direction to Barrs Court without reversal. For its part the HH&BR would withdraw opposition to the Hereford Loop, and construct the Widemarsh Loop itself.

== Amalgamation with the Brecon and Merthyr Railway ==
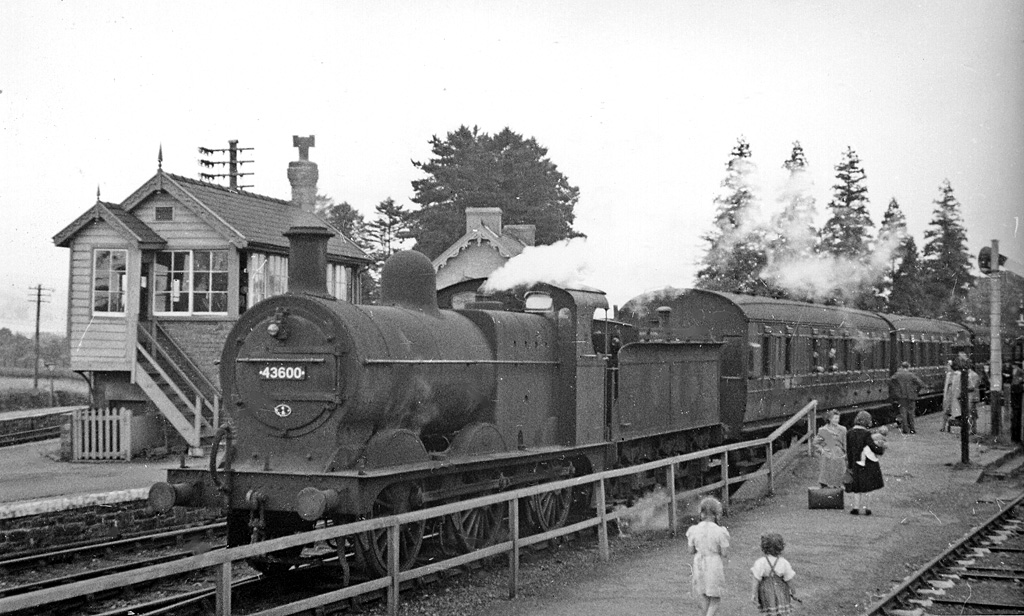
A train from Hereford at Three Cocks Junction in 1949

In 1865 the HH&BR decided to proceed with the amalgamation with the Brecon and Merthyr Railway, and this took effect from 25 August 1865, authorised by the Brecon and Merthyr Railway (Amalgamation) Act 1865 (28 & 29 Vict. c. cccxxiv) of 5 July 1865. The line had been worked from the outset by the contractor, Thomas Savin, who was also working the Brecon and Merthyr Railway; the suggestion that the Great Western Railway worked the line between 26 August 1865 and 5 February 1866 seems to be without foundation. With Savin's financial collapse, the Brecon and Merthyr Railway worked the line during the amalgamated period and up to 30 September 1868.

The combined company (also known as the Brecon and Merthyr Railway) was short of money. On 28 February 1867 the B&MR gave notice to the GWR that it would cease using the Barton station from 30 June 1867. This was a desperate attempt to save money: £620 a year as the toll for using the GWR station. The B&MR trains now only ran to Moorfields.

The Widemarsh Loop was laid in but not connected at the north (GWR) end, and the Brecon Curve was not started. The reasons are not definitively apparent, but the B&MR's extreme financial difficulty, no doubt known to the larger companies, must have played a part. The Brecon Curve was laid in just before expiry of the powers granted by the act of Parliament; a demonstration train ran on 5 May 1870, the day the powers expired, but the junction at the Barrs Court end was not made even then.

It emerged in 1867 that the amalgamation agreement had not been ratified by the Brecon and Merthyr preference shareholders, and in the Court of Chancery the amalgamation was declared void. The combined company then had to separate; this too required an authorising act, the Brecon and Merthyr Railway Arrangement Act 1868 (31 & 32 Vict. c. cxlii) of 13 July 1868. (Note: Jones and Dunstone call this the "B&M (Arrangement) Act of 1868"; Wood refers to this as the Brecon and Merthyr Railway Arrangement Act of 1865, but the date must be wrong.) By then the financial slump in the country had resulted in the combined company having been unable to meet debenture interest, so that the HH&BR resumed its independent existence in the hands of a receiver.

The Mid-Wales Railway arranged to run the now-independent HH&BR trains for twelve months from 1 October 1868, and the GWR allowed the Mid-Wales company to use Barton station for £450 annually.

Hereford, Hay and Brecon Railway Act 1869
- Act of Parliament
- Parliament of the United Kingdom
- Long title: An Act for the conversion of the Mortgages of the Hereford, Hay, and Brecon Railway Company into Debenture Stock; and for other purposes relating to the same Company.
- Citation: 32 & 33 Vict. c. cxl

Dates
- Royal assent: 26 July 1869

Text of statute as originally enacted

The Hereford, Hay and Brecon Railway Company emerged from receivership in 1869, but was still in a serious financial difficulty. A new act of Parliament, the Hereford, Hay and Brecon Railway Act 1869 (32 & 33 Vict. c. cxl) passed on 26 July 1869 authorised the Widemarsh Loop (again), an extension of the station at Moorfields, which looked as if it was going to be permanent, and some financial reconstruction, and running powers to Brecon.

== Amalgamation with the Midland Railway ==
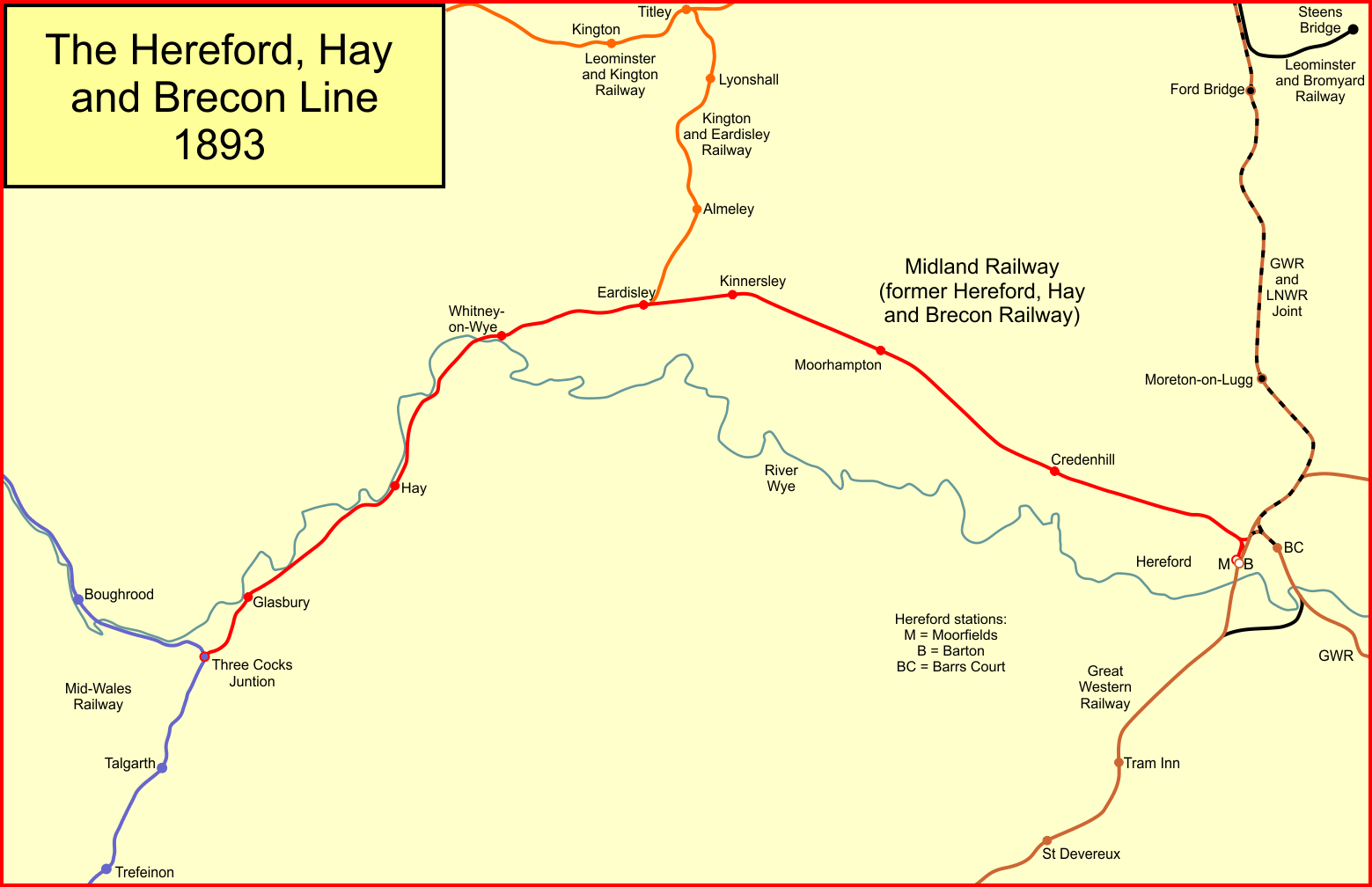
The former Hereford, Hay and Brecon lines in 1893

The Midland Railway wished to get access to South Wales by securing a base in the Swansea district, and the Midland opened negotiations with the HH&BR in July 1869. This quickly led to an agreement, confirmed on 2 August 1869. It gave the Midland Railway "exclusive running powers" over the HH&BR system. In effect this was a lease, and the form of words was no doubt intended to deceive the GWR. The arrangement came into force on 1 October 1869. The Midland had harboured reservations about the working arrangement lest creditors of the HH&BR seize the Midland rolling stock. The GWR were dismayed at this turn of events, for they had been conducting negotiations with the HH&BR themselves. When the Midland Railway tried to run a train into Barton, the GWR station at Hereford, the GWR blocked the junction with an engine and wagons, refusing to allow the Midland to get access.

The HH&BR sought a writ of mandamus in the High Court and succeeded in getting power to reinstate (if necessary) the junction at Barton, and to use the Barton station as before. However these powers did not extend to the Midland Railway, and for the time being the GWR continued to block access to that company's trains. The GWR now demanded payment from the HH&BR for the earlier works that gave access to the HH&BR into Barton. The HH&BR refused the claim, and the matter went to Bristol Assizes in August 1870, where at length the GWR was granted the sum of £1,255.

The Midland continued to clash in court battles with the GWR over the claimed right to run their trains into Barton, and eventually they won. Nevertheless it was not until 1 April 1874 that Brecon trains resumed using Barton. They continued to use it until 1893, reversing their trains there and running a shuttle for through Worcester carriages to and from Barrs Court.

Midland Railway (Hereford, Hay and Brecon Railway Lease) Act 1874
- Act of Parliament
- Parliament of the United Kingdom
- Long title: An Act to lease the Hereford, Hay, and Brecon Railway to the Midland Railway Company; and for other purposes.
- Citation: 37 & 38 Vict. c. clxii

Dates
- Royal assent: 30 July 1874

Text of statute as originally enacted

The Midland Railway Company took a full lease of the line by the Midland Railway (Hereford, Hay and Brecon Railway Lease) Act 1874 (37 & 38 Vict. c. clxii) of 30 July 1874 and finally absorbed the HH&BR in 1876.

== Transfer from Barton to Barrs Court ==
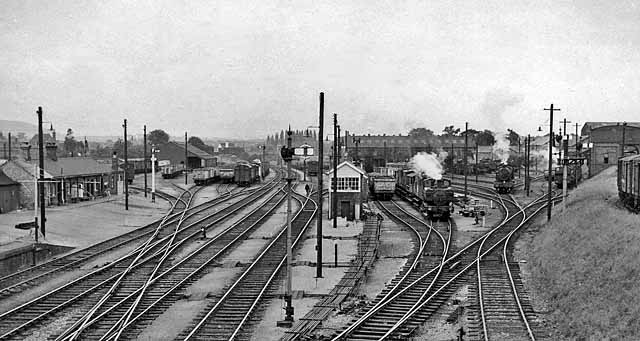
Barton engine shed and yards in 1963; the HH&BR line is behind the camera

Midland trains started to work through to Swansea over the Neath and Brecon Railway and the Swansea Vale Railway on 2 July 1877. The use of Barton at Hereford was never entirely convenient, because Barrs Court was used by through trains and connections there were desirable. Antagonism between the respective companies (Midland, GWR and LNWR) resulted in any agreement being much delayed until 21 May 1891. The Midland Railway would now construct the Widemarsh Loop (at last); the GWR would form the northern junction with it; the GWR and the LNWR would make and complete the Brecon curve; and the Midland would use Barrs Court station and vacate Barton.

Finally the Brecon Curve was opened from 2 January 1893, and HH&BR (Midland) trains started to use Barrs Court. Midland Railway through coaches between Birmingham and Brecon, later Swansea, started running from 8 July 1873; they continued running until 31 December 1916.

From 1 January 1893 Barton was reduced to the status of a goods station. Engines were turned on the triangle until 30 June 1894, when the South Curve was cut.

== After 1923 ==
Following the Railways Act 1921, most of the railways of Great Britain were "grouped" into one or other of four large companies, in the months preceding the beginning of 1923. The Midland Railway was a constituent of the new London, Midland and Scottish Railway (LMS) and the Great Western Railway joined with certain other railways and continued under the same name.

The LMS discontinued through passenger trains between Swansea and Hereford from 1 January 1931. The Midland Railway had never developed the line for through express passenger working; its purpose was simply the carriage of goods to and from Swansea, and local passenger traffic was run as an incidental activity.

Purely local passenger and goods business in a rural area was susceptible to road competition, and indeed income had always been weak. The line was closed to passengers on 31 December 1962, and to all traffic in 1964, from Talyllyn Junction to Eardisley on 4 May 1964, and throughout on 4 August 1964.

== Topography ==
There was a steady climb from Moorfields as far as Moorhampton, rising 160 feet in 8 miles. After milder gradients, the line rose again from Hay to Glasbury, at 1 in 80 and 84; the line then fell to Three Cocks Junction.

=== Station list ===
Location	Opened	Closed	Notes
Hereford Moorfields	30 June 1863	1 April 1874	
Credenhill	30 June 1863	31 December 1962	
Westmoor Flag	30 June 1863	uncertain	
Moorhampton	30 June 1863	31 December 1962	
Kinnersley	1 September 1863	31 December 1962	
Eardisley	30 June 1863	31 December 1962	convergence of the Kington and Eardisley Railway, 1874–1940
Whitney	11 July 1864	31 December 1962	renamed Whitney-on-the-Wye
Hay Junction			convergence of Golden Valley Railway, 1889–1950
Hay	11 July 1864	31 December 1962	renamed Hay-on-Wye 1955
Glasbury	19 September 1864	31 December 1962	renamed Glasbury-on-Wye 1894
			end-on junction with Mid-Wales Railway
Three Cocks Junction	13 September 1864	31 December 1962	convergence of Mid-Wales Railway line from Llanidloes
