= Weobley Castle, Herefordshire =

Weobley Castle
- Weobley, Herefordshire
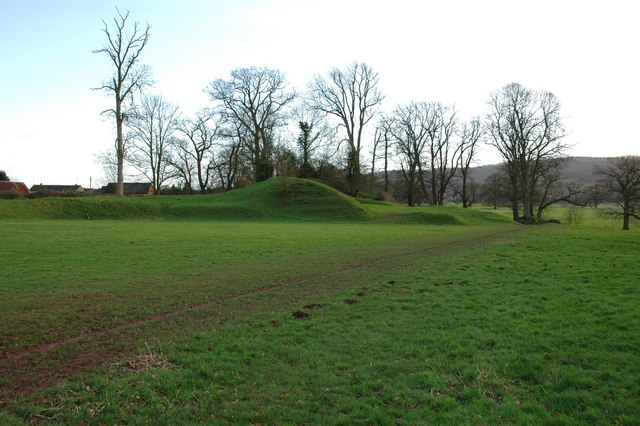
- Site of Weobley Castle

Location
- Coordinates: 52.1572°N 2.8731°W

Weobley Castle was a ringwork and bailey castle in the English county of Herefordshire (grid reference SO40365135). The castle belonged to the De Lacy family who also owned the castles of Ludlow and Ewyas Harold. Walter de Lacy, as Lord of Meath, was one of the most powerful magnates in Ireland. King John I of England doubted his loyalty and so took de Lacy's property into his possession. The estates were put under the custodianship of William de Braose, de Lacy's father-in-law. In 1208 de Braose used Weobley Castle to attack the king's property in Herefordshire. He fled to Ireland, seeking safety with Walter de Lacy in Trim Castle; John pursued him and punished the pair. Walter de Lacy, his brother Hugh, and William de Braose failed to appease the king and fled to France. As a result, all the de Lacy property was taken into the possession of the Crown. All that remains of the castle are severely damaged earthworks.
