= List of Old Uppinghamians =

Alumni of Uppingham School are known as Old Uppinghamians.

Uppingham School is a co-educational independent school situated in the small market town of Uppingham, in Rutland, England. The school was founded in 1584 by Robert Johnson, the Archdeacon of Leicester, who also established Oakham School.

Notable former pupils include:

== A ==
- Patrick Abercrombie, architect and town planner
- William Mitchell Acworth, British railway economist, barrister and politician
- Robert Adley, Member of Parliament for Bristol North East and Christchurch
- Crispin Agnew, Rothesay Herald and former explorer and mountaineer.
- Jonathan Agnew, England, Leicestershire cricketer and chief cricket correspondent for BBC Radio (The Lodge)
- John Aldam Aizlewood, Major-General, British Army officer in World War I and World War II
- John Aldridge, Royal Academician
- Anthony Armstrong, author, essayist, dramatist
- Anthony Nightingale, Taipan

== B ==
- Tristan Ballance, cricketer
- Hagan Bayley, Prof. of Chemical Biology, Oxford University and inventor
- Adrian Bell, author of Corduroy
- Robin Blaze, countertenor
- Brian Boobbyer, England rugby player and evangelist for Moral Re-Armament
- Thomas George Bonney, geologist
- Ernle Bradford, historian and writer
- Katie Breathwick, broadcaster, Classic FM
- Edward Brittain, younger brother of Vera Brittain, whose stories are told in her autobiography Testament of Youth (The Lodge)

== C ==
- Everard Calthrop, railway engineer and inventor
- Donald Campbell, World Land and Water Speed record holder, killed on Coniston Water in Bluebird (West Deyne)
- Sir Malcolm Campbell, holder of World Land and Water Speed records in 1920s and 1930s (West Deyne)
- Archie Cochrane, medic, researcher and pioneer of evidence-based medicine
- Holden Chow, solicitor and politician, vice-chairman of the Democratic Alliance of the Betterment and Progress of Hong Kong (DAB).

== D ==
- Johnny Dawes, rock climber
- Adrian Dixon, Master of Peterhouse, Cambridge University
- Eric Dorman-Smith, British Army officer and Irish nationalist
- Stephen Dorrell, Health Secretary 1995–97
- Norman Douglas, novelist and travel writer
- Charles Dunstone, co-founder of Carphone Warehouse (Lorne House)

== E ==
- John H. Edwards, geneticist, and his brother A. W. F. Edwards, statistician
- Dan Everard, British inventor, engineer and author

== F ==
- William Fawcett, writer on horses, hunting and racing
- Ronald Firbank, novelist
- Pat Fish, songwriter and musician
- James Elroy Flecker, poet and dramatist
- Thomas Fowler, cricketer
- Richard Francis, broadcaster
- Nick Freeman, "Mr Loophole", celebrity lawyer
- Edward Fowler, cricketer
- Stephen Fry, actor, comedian (Blackadder) and writer (Fircroft), expelled in 1972

== G ==
- Christopher Gabbitas, baritone for The King's Singers
- William Garforth, cricketer and soldier
- Andrew Gimson, political journalist (West Bank)
- Piers Gough, architect (West Bank)

== H ==
- John Hare, cricketer
- Walter Abel Heurtley, classical archaeologist
- Johnny Hon, entrepreneur and founder of The Global Group
- Mark Haddon, author of The Curious Incident of the Dog in the Night-Time
- Russell Harmer, Olympic gold medalist
- George Harris, cricketer
- Oliver Hill, architect (Hall)
- E. W. Hornung, author
- Danny Hipkiss, professional rugby player, Leicester Tigers and England
- Brian Horrocks, British Army general, corps commander in the Second World War
- Henry Hughes, cricketer
- Balfour Oliphant Hutchison, Lieutenant-General, British Army officer in World War I and World War II

== I ==
- George Ivatt, mechanical engineer

== J ==
- Christian Jessen, doctor and television presenter (Fircroft)
- Harry Judd, musician and member of McFly (Fircroft)

== K ==
- Boris Karloff, actor
- Dominic Keating, actor
- Andrew Kennedy, tenor (Winner of Rosenblatt Song Prize at Cardiff Singer of the World 2005) (Fircroft)
- Patrick Kinmonth, opera director, stage designer, writer
- Norman Knight, cricketer and colonial administrator

== L ==
- Edward Thurlow Leeds, archaeologist, keeper of the Ashmolean Museum 1928–1945
- John Lees, cricketer
- David Li, current chairman and chief executive of the Bank of East Asia in Hong Kong
- Roland Leighton, fiancé of Vera Brittain, whose stories are told in her autobiography Testament of Youth (The Lodge)
- John O. Lyle, chairman and president of Tate & Lyle, businessman

== M ==
- Claude Maxwell Macdonald, soldier-diplomat
- Gregor MacGregor, England, Scotland, Cambridge University, Middlesex cricketer and rugby player
- Charles Mallam, cricketer
- Lionel Martineau, cricketer
- William Arnold Mathews, Anglican priest and writer
- John McIver, Scottish cricketer
- Tim McMullan, actor (School House)
- Roger Miller, cricketer
- Sir Dermot Milman, 8th Baronet, rugby union international and first-class cricketer
- Ed Minton and Alex Davies, members of rock band Elliot Minor (School House)
- Ernest John Moeran, composer
- Cecil Moon, cricketer
- Godfrey Morgan, cricketer
- Oscar Murton, Baron Murton of Lindisfarne, politician

== N ==
- Richard Lewis Nettleship, philosopher
- C. R. W. Nevinson, war artist in both world wars
- Ernest Newton, architect, president RIBA
- Anthony Nightingale, Taipan, Jardine Matheson & Co., Hongkong.

== P ==
- William Pershke, cricketer
- Dickson Poon, businessman and non-executive Chairman of Harvey Nichols
- Peter Powell, Radio One disc jockey
- William Henry Pratt, who achieved fame under his stage name, Boris Karloff
- James Purves, cricketer

== R ==
- Charles E. Raven, Vice-Chancellor of Cambridge University, theologian, intellectual, preacher
- Hardwicke Rawnsley, co-founder of the National Trust
- Mark Redhead, Producer
- Victor Richardson, associate of Vera Brittain, whose stories are told in her autobiography Testament of Youth (The Lodge)
- Edward Riddell, cricketer
- Thomas Ridley, cricketer, barrister and clergyman
- Sam Riley, actor
- David Ross, co-founder of Carphone Warehouse (Constables)
- Alan Rotherham, (left in 1881), former England rugby union international, captain of England, and inductee into the IRB Hall of Fame
- Guy Rowlands, historian (The Lodge)

== S ==
- Reginald Savory, British Indian Army Officer in World War I and World War II
- John Schlesinger, film director
- Cecil Sharp, musician, collector and populariser of English folk song and dance
- Charlie Simpson, musician in Busted (2002–2005, 2015–present), Fightstar (2003–present) and as a solo artist (2011–present) (Meadhurst)
- Arthur Somervell, composer
- Toby Spence, tenor
- Phil Spencer, property expert, Channel 4 television (The Lodge)
- Ed Stafford, explorer, walking the length of the Amazon River
- Rick Stein, chef and restaurateur (West Deyne)
- George Martin Stephen, former High Master of St Paul's School
- John Suchet, journalist and broadcaster (Farleigh)

== T ==
- Shiv Thakor, cricketer
- Richard Thorp, actor ('Emergency Ward 10'; 7 years, 'Emmerdale'; 30 years), writer
- Robert Thorogood, actor (Cambridge Footlights), writer Death in Paradise (Fircroft)
- Richard Tice, Reform UK Member of Parliament for Boston and Skegness
- Edward Timpson Conservative Member of Parliament for Crewe and Nantwich
- Edward Titley, cricketer
- Arthur Treacher, film and stage actor
- Edward Beadon Turner (1854–1931), physician and England rugby union international.
- Sir George Robertson Turner (1855–1941), surgeon and England rugby union international
- Charles Tolhurst, Unemployed (West Bank)

== V ==
- Johnny Vaughan, television and radio presenter

== W ==
- Anthony Way, former chorister, St Paul's Cathedral (School House)
- James Whitaker, Leicestershire and England cricketer (The Lodge)
- Jenny Willott, Member of Parliament for Cardiff Central
- Charles Plumpton Wilson (1859–1938), England footballer

== Y ==
- William Yates, former member of both British and Australian Parliaments

== See also ==
- Category:People educated at Uppingham School
