= Public school (United Kingdom) =

Fee-charging schools in England and Wales

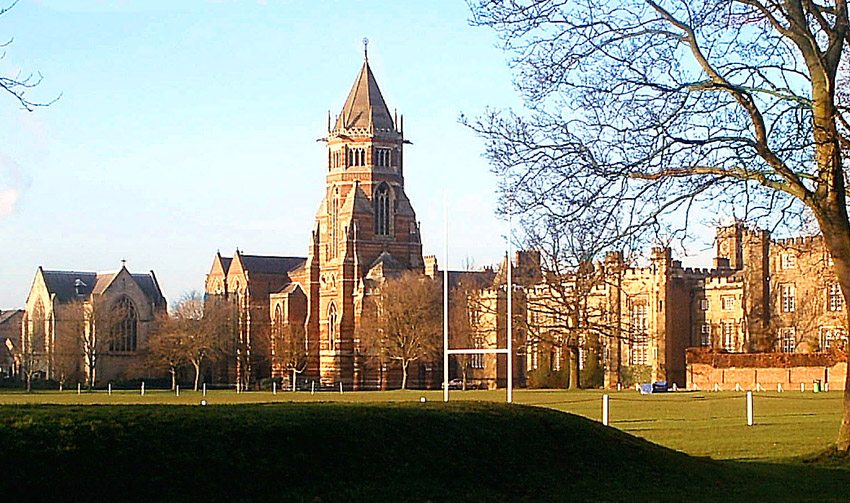
The playing fields of Rugby School, 1567, reestablished 1828. The rules of rugby football were codified here in 1845.

A public school in England and Wales is a type of fee-charging private school originally for older boys. The schools are "public" from a historical schooling context in the sense of being open to pupils irrespective of locality, (Christian) denomination, paternal trade or profession, or family affiliation with governing or military service, and also not being run for the profit of a private owner.

Although the term "public school" has been in use since at least the 12th century, its usage was formalised by the Public Schools Act 1868 (31 & 32 Vict. c. 118), (Note: The Public Schools Act 1868 does not define "public school"; as made clear in its preamble, it is "An Act to make further Provision for the good Government and Extension of certain Public Schools in England.") which put into law most recommendations of the 1864 Clarendon Report. Nine prestigious schools were investigated by Clarendon (including two day schools, Merchant Taylors' and St Paul's) and seven subsequently reformed by the Act: Eton, Shrewsbury, Harrow, Winchester, Rugby, Westminster, and Charterhouse. Team and competitive sports became an important part of the curriculum, which contributed to establishing the rules and propagating the growth of many different sports.

Though most public schools were originally founded under true charitable purposes for poor pupils, by the modern age conversely they have become elite institutions and are associated with the ruling class. Historically, public schools produced many of the military officers and administrators of the British Empire.

The term is rarely used in Scotland, where "public school" has been used since the early 18th century to refer to publicly funded schools, and was defined by the Education (Scotland) Act 1872 as including those managed by the school board of a parish, or of a burgh. There are instances of the term being used to refer to elite Scots private fee-paying schools.

== Definition ==
There is no single or absolute definition of public school, and the use of the term has varied over time and according to context. The starting point was the contrast between a public school and private teaching (eg., provided by a hired tutor). In England and Wales schools that are called public schools are not funded from public taxation: schools that are so funded are generally termed "state schools".

Sydney Smith in an 1810 article published in The Edinburgh Review suggested the following:

By a public school, we mean an endowed place of education of old standing, to which the sons of gentlemen resort in considerable numbers, and where they continue to reside, from eight or nine, to eighteen years of age ... The characteristic features of these schools are, their antiquity, the numbers, and the ages of the young people who are educated at them.

Arthur Leach stated in his 1899 History of Winchester College: "The only working definition of a Public School ... is that it is an aristocratic or plutocratic school which is wholly or almost wholly a Boarding School, is under some form of more or less public control, and is ... non-local". Edward C. Mack defined a public school in 1938 as "a non-local endowed boarding school for the upper classes". Vivian Ogilvie in the 1957 The English Public School similarly suggests five "characteristics commonly associated with a public school":

it is a class school, catering for a well-to-do clientèle; it is expensive; it is non-local; it is a predominantly boarding school; it is independent of the State and of local government, yet it is not privately owned or run for profit.

In November 1965, the UK Cabinet considered the definition for use by the Public Schools Commission set up that year. Its starting point was the 1944 Fleming Committee definition, which used schools that were members of the then Headmasters' Conference, the Governing Bodies Association or the Girls' Schools Association. At that time, there were 276 such independent schools (134 boys and 142 girls), which the 1965 Public Schools Commission took in scope of its work alongside 22 maintained and 152 direct grant grammar schools.

In 2023, by the 1965 Public Schools Commission definition or the 1944 Fleming Committee definition, there were 302 independent secondary schools belonging to the Headmasters' and Headmistresses' Conference (78% of HMC schools are co-educational, 9% were for boys only and 13% for girls only), and 152 independent girls' secondary schools belonging to the Girls' Schools Association.

The majority of public schools are affiliated with, or were established by, a Christian denomination, principally the Church of England, but in some cases the Roman Catholic and Methodist churches. Examples of schools recorded by the Department for Education as having an Anglican or Church of England religious character include Pocklington School, Rugby School, Marlborough College, and The King's School, Canterbury. A small number are non-denominational or inherently secular, including Oswestry School, Sevenoaks School, Bedales, and University College School.

The perception of a top tier of public schools is long standing, but always with some debate on membership. Howard Staunton's book of 1865 entitled The Great Schools of England considered the term meant the nine Clarendon Commission schools plus Cheltenham College, Christ's Hospital, and Dulwich College. In 1881, C. Kegan Paul & Co published Our Public Schools, with chapters on seven schools: Eton, Harrow, Winchester, Rugby, Westminster, Marlborough, and Charterhouse. In 1893 Edward Arnold published a book entitled Great Public Schools, with a chapter on each of Eton, Harrow, Charterhouse, Cheltenham, Rugby, Clifton, Westminster, Marlborough, Haileybury, and Winchester. The Bryce Report of 1895 (Report of the Royal Commission on Secondary Education) described the schools reformed by the Public Schools Act 1868 as the "seven 'great endowed schools'".

== History ==
=== Early history ===
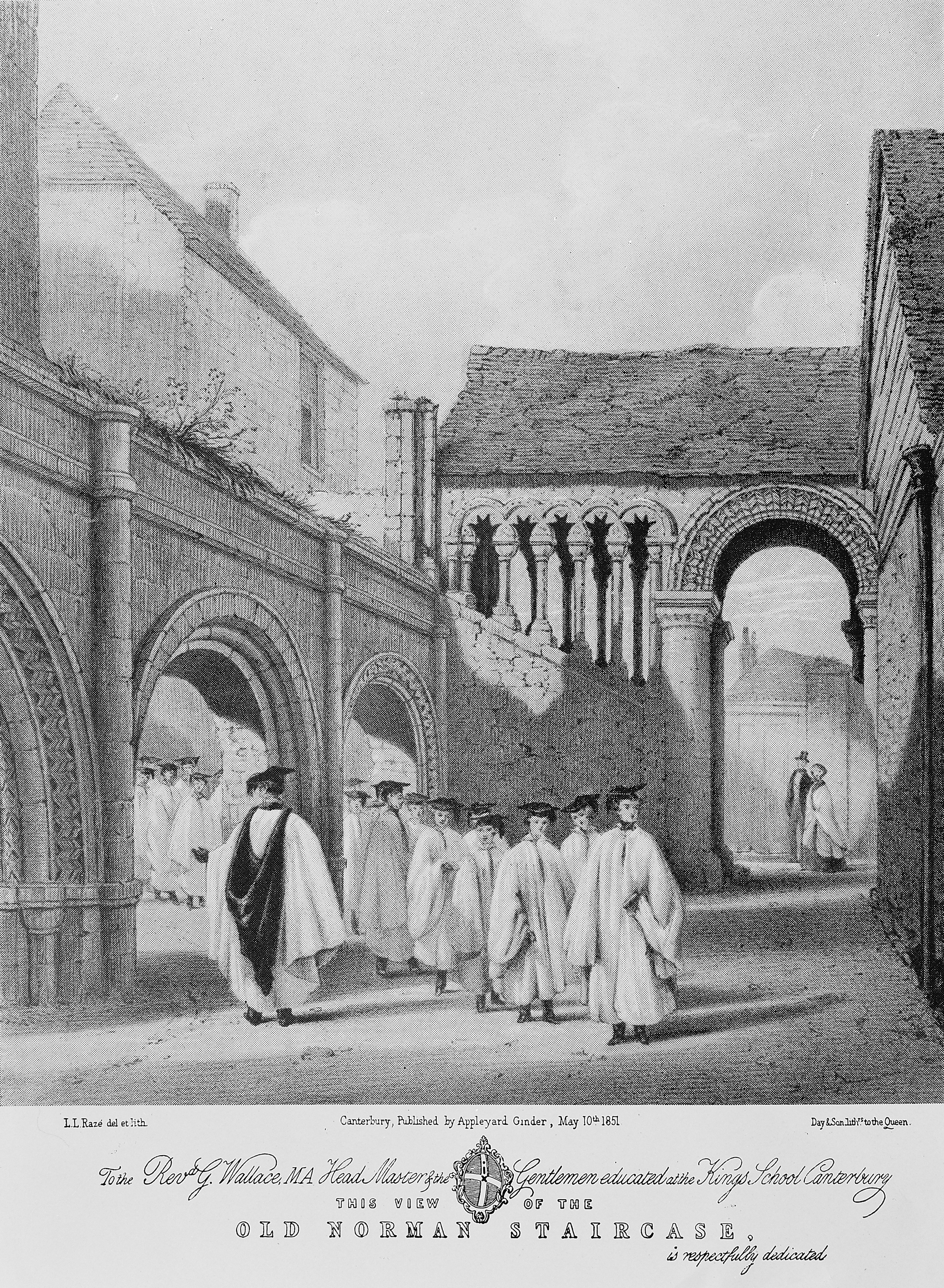
View of the old Norman Staircase and scholars, King's School Canterbury, lithograph by William Harvey, 1851

Public schools emerged from grammar schools established to educate pupils, usually destined for clerical orders, in Latin grammar. Thus, concerned with educating boys. The term "public" came into use because over time access to such schools was not restricted on the basis of home location, paternal occupation or status, and that they were subject to an element of public management or control, in contrast to private schools which were run for the personal profit of the owner(s). The origins of schools in England were primarily religious, although in 1640 the House of Commons invited the reformer and promoter of universal education Comenius to England to establish and participate in an agency for the promotion of learning. It was intended that by-products of this would be the publication of "universal" books and the setting up of schools for boys and girls. The English Civil War prevented any such reform.

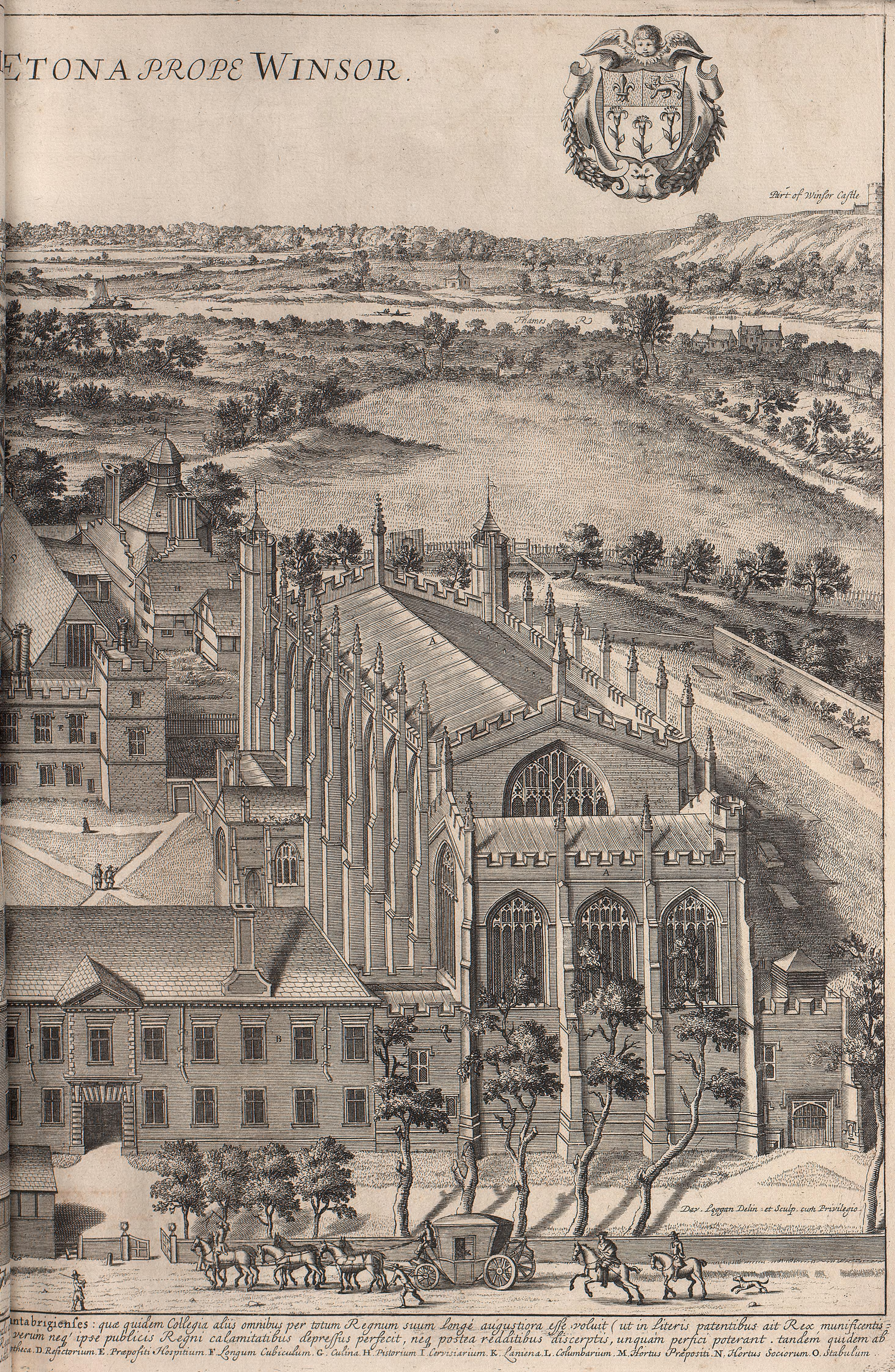
A bird's eye view of Eton College, founded 1440, by David Loggan, published in his Cantabrigia Illustrata of 1690

Some schools are particularly old, such as The King's School, Canterbury c. 597, The King's School, Rochester c. 604, St Peter's School, York c. 627, Sherborne School c. 710, (refounded 1550 by Edward VI), Warwick School c. 914, King's Ely c. 970 (once the Ely Cathedral Grammar School, then the King's School Ely when refounded in 1541 by Henry VIII, subsequently adopting the current name in 2012) and St Albans School c. 948. Until the Late Middle Ages most schools were controlled by the Church; and had specific entrance criteria; others were restricted to the sons of members of guilds, trades, or livery companies.

In 1382 William of Wykeham, Bishop of Winchester and Chancellor of England, founded Winchester College. In 1440 Henry VI founded Eton College. These schools had significantly larger foundations than the existing local grammar schools, had high level political patronage, and also accepted "non-local" pupils. This was "the start of a new kind of school". Edward VI's Chantries Act of 1547 dissolved religious endowments which funded many schools. Among the schools whose foundations were subsequently renewed or secured were Berkhamsted School (c. 1541), Sherborne School (c. 705), Stamford School (c. 1532) and Pocklington School (1514), the latter having been re-established by an Act of Parliament in 1552 following the dissolution of its associated religious guild. Elizabeth I refounded Westminster School in 1560, with new statutes, to select forty Queen's Scholars. This created a "triad" of privileged schools—Winchester, Eton and Westminster. From the 16th century onward, boys' boarding schools continued to be founded or endowed for public use.

Daniel Defoe in The Compleat English Gentleman of 1728, writes of "the great schools of Eton, Winchester, Westminster, Felsted, Bishop Stortford (sic), (Note: Defoe is referring to the long defunct Bishop's Stortford Grammar School, not Bishop's Stortford College which was established in 1868.) Canterbury and others, where the children—nay, the eldest sons—of some of the best families in England have been educated."

By the end of the 17th century, the London day schools St Paul's and Merchant Taylors', together with the charitable foundations of Christ's Hospital and Charterhouse, had developed an elevated "standing in popular regard". By the end of the 18th century, two local grammar schools, Harrow and Rugby, had achieved national fame. In the case of Harrow, political sponsorship by aristocratic Whig politician James Brydges (later Duke of Chandos) played a significant role, but also, as was the case too with Rugby, an exemplary headmaster was a key factor in raising the status of the school. This phenomenon was also seen at Shrewsbury, where Samuel Butler was headmaster between 1798 and 1836.

"Would you your son should be a sot or dunce,
Lascivious, headstrong, or all these at once;
That in good time the stripling's finish'd taste
For loose expense and fashionable waste
Should prove your ruin, and his own at last;
Train him in public with a mob of boys,
Childish in mischief only and in noise,
Else of a mannish growth, and five in ten
In infidelity and lewdness men. ..."

— Extract from William Cowper's 1784
Tirocinium or A Review of Schools

In 1801 William Vincent, headmaster of Westminster published A Defence of Public Education. It contains the text "...comprize under the expression of Public Schools? Are we to understand only Winchester, Eton and Westminster? or are we to extend our notion, as we ought to do, to the other three great schools in the Metropolis; (Note: St Paul's, Merchant Taylors', Charterhouse) to Harrow, Rugby, Manchester, Wakefield and many more of equal magnitude in the North?"

In 1816 Rudolph Ackermann published a book which used the term "History of the Public Schools" of what he described as the "principal schools of England", entitled The History of the Colleges of Winchester, Eton, and Westminster; with the Charter-House, the Schools of St. Paul's, Merchant Taylors, Harrow, and Rugby, and the Free-School of Christ's Hospital.

In 1818 Nicholas Carlisle published a two-volume survey entitled A Concise Description of the Endowed Grammar Schools in England and Wales. The survey was conducted by means of a questionnaire sent to the schools. The description of 475 schools range from one or two paragraphs to many pages of detail.

Thomas Arnold became headmaster of Rugby School in 1828, and the reforming actions he took during his fourteen years of tenure established a new model for the nineteenth and early twentieth century public school. Arnold developed the praepostor (or prefect) system, in which a group of senior boys were given disciplinary powers of other pupils. This became a standard method to establish good order in the public schools, which had developed a reputation for rowdiness and on occasion, serious disorder.

Separate preparatory schools (or "prep schools") for younger boys developed from the 1830s, with entry to the senior schools becoming limited to boys of at least 12 or 13 years old. The first of these was Windlesham House School, established with support from Thomas Arnold, the headmaster of Rugby School between 1828 and 1841.

=== Victorian period ===
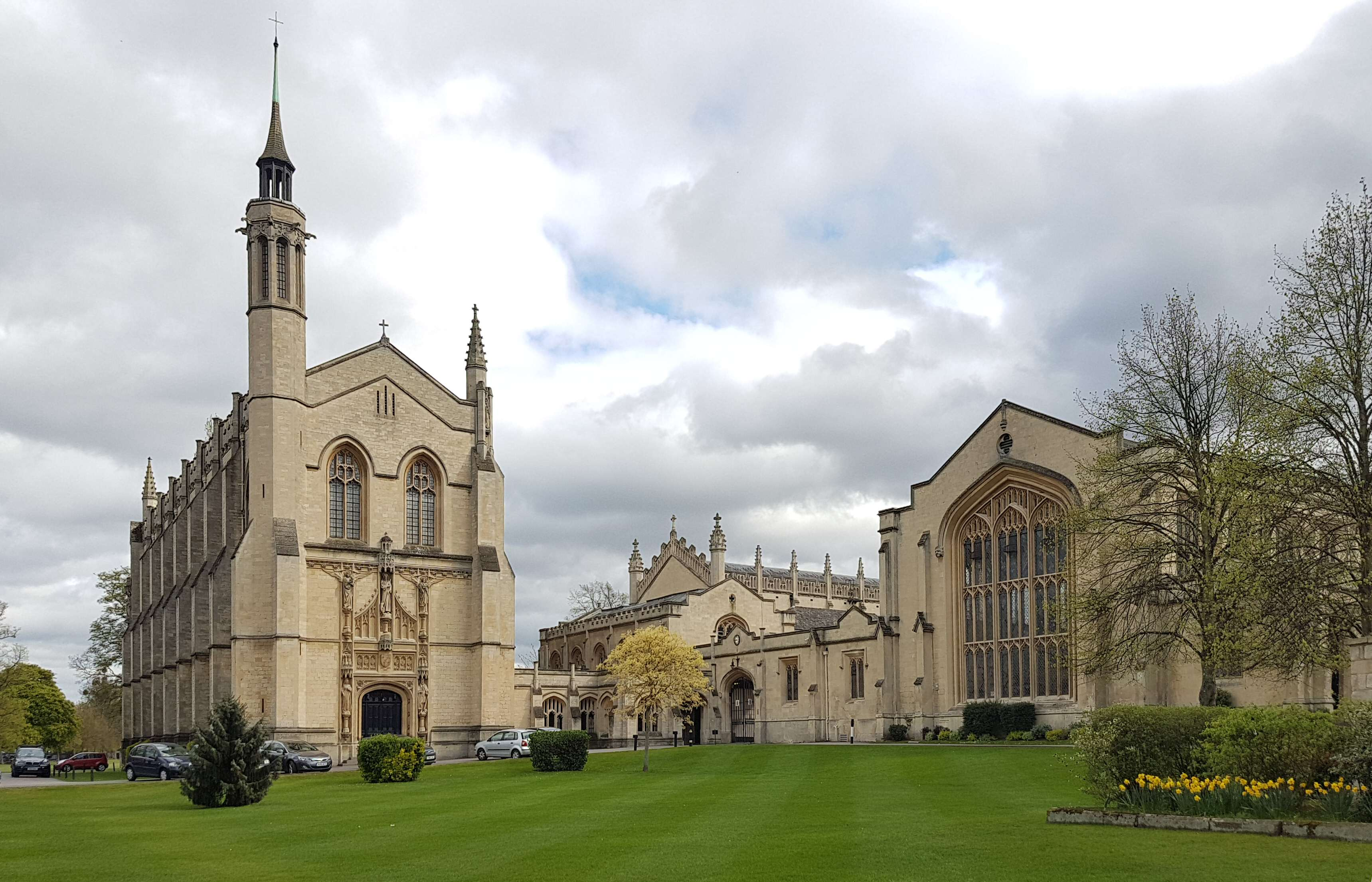
Cheltenham College, 1841

A royal commission, the Clarendon Commission (1861–1864), investigated nine of the more established schools, including seven boarding schools (Charterhouse, Eton, Harrow, Rugby, Shrewsbury, Westminster and Winchester) and two day schools (St Paul's and Merchant Taylors').

The Public Schools Act 1868 subsequently regulated and reformed the seven boarding schools investigated by Clarendon, and in summary established and granted autonomy to new governing bodies for the seven schools and as part of that, released them from previous obligations under their founding charters to educate "boys on the Foundation" ie scholarship boys who paid nominal or no fees. The act gave the seven schools independence from direct jurisdiction or responsibility of the Crown, the established church, or the government. Henceforth each of these schools was to be managed by a board of governors. St Paul's School and the Merchant Taylors' School claimed successfully that their constitutions made them "private" schools, and were excluded from the requirements of this legislation.

The Taunton Commission was appointed in 1864 to examine the remaining 782 endowed grammar schools, and in 1868 produced recommendations to restructure their endowments; these recommendations were included, in modified form, in the Endowed Schools Act 1869. In that year Edward Thring, headmaster of Uppingham School, wrote to 37 of his fellow headmasters of what he considered the leading boys' schools, not covered by the Public Schools Act 1868, inviting them to meet annually to address the threat posed by the Endowed Schools Act 1869. In the first year 12 headmasters attended; the following year 34 attended, including heads from the Clarendon schools. The Headmasters' Conference (HMC), now the Headmasters' and Headmistresses' Conference, has grown steadily and by 2021 had 298 British and Irish schools as members.

Many new schools were established in the mid-part of the nineteenth century including the day schools City of London School (1837) and Liverpool College (1840). New boarding schools included Cheltenham (1841), Marlborough (1843), Rossall (1844), Radley (1847), Taunton (1847), Lancing (1848), Hurstpierpoint (1849), Bradfield (1850), Wellington (1852), Epsom (1855), Ardingly (1858), Clifton (1862), Malvern (1862), Haileybury (1862), Framlingham (1864), Cranleigh (1865) and Monkton Combe (1868). In 1887 the Divisional Court and the Court of Appeal determined that the City of London School was a public school.

The Public Schools Yearbook (Note: Published annually as The Public Schools Yearbook from 1889 to 1934; as The Public and Preparatory Schools Yearbook from 1935 to 1985; as The Independent Schools Yearbook from 1986 to date.) was published for the first time in 1889, listing 30 schools, mostly boarding schools. The day school exceptions were St Paul's School and Merchant Taylors' School. By 1895 there were entries for 64 schools.

=== Early and mid-20th century ===
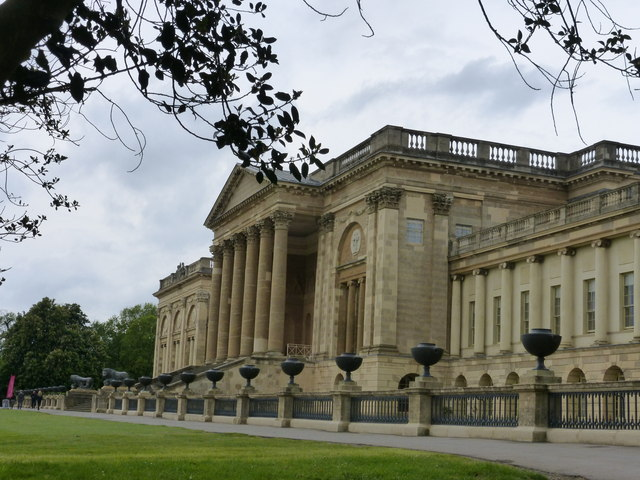
Stowe School opened in 1923, at Stowe House, which was completed in 1779

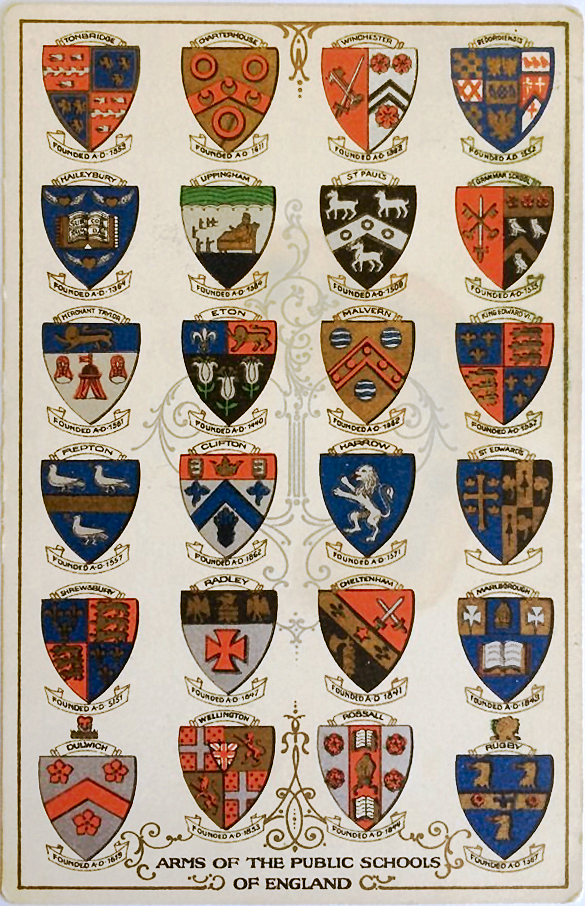
The arms of 24 public schools on a 1911 postcard. From top to bottom (left to right): 1. Tonbridge; Charterhouse; Winchester; Bedford; 2. Haileybury; Uppingham; St Paul's; Manchester Grammar; 3. Merchant Taylors'; Eton; Malvern; King Edward VI; 4. Repton; Clifton; Harrow; St Edwards; 5. Shrewsbury; Radley; Cheltenham; Marlborough; 6. Dulwich; Wellington; Rossall; Rugby

Frederick William Sanderson, Headmaster of Oundle School, initiated educational reforms at the turn of the century. Oundle became the first school to create an engineering curriculum as well as teaching biochemistry and agriculture.

There was a further expansion in public school education in the interwar years. New schools such as Rendcomb (1920), Stowe (1923), Canford (1923), Bryanston (1928) and Millfield (1935) were established.

In 1942 the then President of the Board of Education Rab Butler appointed a Committee on Public Schools under the leadership of David Fleming. The committee was tasked to "consider means whereby the association between the Public Schools and the general educational system of the country could be developed and extended". The Fleming Report (1944) entitled The Public Schools and the General Education System defined a public school as a member of the Governing Bodies Association or the Headmasters' Conference. The Fleming Committee recommended that one-quarter of the places at the public schools should be assigned to a national bursary scheme for children who would benefit from boarding. A key advocate was the post-war Minister of Education Ellen Wilkinson, but the proposed national bursary scheme never got into legislation in that post-war age of severe budget constraints. The Conservative government elected in 1951 did not adopt the proposal. It failed because it was not a high priority for either party, money was tight, there was wavering support from both public schools and local education authorities, and no consensus was reached on how to select the pupils to participate.

Based on the recommendations of the Fleming Report, the Education Act 1944, also known as "the Butler Act", did, however, establish an enhanced status for endowed grammar schools receiving a grant from central government. The direct grant grammar schools would henceforth receive partial state funding (a "direct grant") in return for taking between 25 and 50 percent of its pupils from state primary schools.

The Labour government in 1965 made major changes to the organisation of state maintained schools issuing Circular 10/65 which directed local authorities to phase out selection at eleven years of age. It also fulfilled its pledge to examine the role of public schools, setting up a royal commission "to advise on the best way of integrating the public schools with the State system". The commission used a wider definition than that of the Fleming Committee. The Public Schools Commission produced two reports: the Newsom Report of 1968 entitled The Public Schools Commission: First Report covering boarding schools and the Donnison Report of 1970 entitled The Public Schools Commission: Second Report covering day schools, including also direct grant and maintained grammar schools. The report presented by John Newsom in 1968 was supportive of boarding school education and made 52 recommendations, including state funding of up to 45,000 places. No action was taken by the then Labour government (or successive administrations). The report presented by David Donnison in 1970 made 25 recommendations for England and Wales and 22 for Scotland. The commission was divided on many issues so several of the recommendations were not made with full consensus. No action was taken by the incoming (1970) Conservative government but five years later the direct grant scheme was terminated by Labour.

School and pupil numbers presented to Cabinet in November 1965
Type	Total schools	No. of pupils	Boys		Girls	
Type	Total schools	No. of pupils	Boarding	Day	Boarding	Day
Independent schools within the HMC, GBA or GSA	276	95,500	106	28	83	59
Direct grant maintained schools within the HMC (out of the total 179 grant maintained schools); In addition there were 27 Direct Grant schools which are not within the HMC.	152		14	58	1	79
Maintained schools within the HMC	22					
State secondary schools (maintained)	6000					
Private schools	3130					

=== Late 20th century ===
The social changes of the 1960s were felt in the public schools; the new headmaster at Oundle School noted that "student protests and intellectual ferment were challenging the status quo". These challenges later coincided with the mid-1970s recession and moves by the Labour government to separate the independent and state sectors.

The direct grant scheme was abolished in 1975 and the HMC schools within the scheme became fully independent. Local authorities were ordered to cease funding places at independent schools. This accounted for over a quarter of places at 56 schools, and over half the places at 22 schools. Between 1975 and 1983 funding was also withdrawn from 11 voluntary-aided grammar schools, which became independent schools and full members of the HMC. State funding was however revived between 1981 and 1997 with the introduction of the Assisted Places Scheme, which provided support for 80,000 pupils attending schools not part of the state maintained sector. Many boarding schools started to admit day pupils for the first time, and others abolished boarding completely. Some started accepting girls in the sixth form, while others became fully co-educational.

Corporal punishment, was abolished in state schools in 1986, and had been abandoned in most public schools by the time it was formally banned in independent schools in 1999 in England and Wales, (2000 in Scotland and 2003 in Northern Ireland). The system of fagging, whereby younger pupils in some schools were required to act to some extent as personal servants to the most senior boys, was phased out during the 1970s and 1980s.

=== 21st century ===
In September 2005 the UK Office of Fair Trading (OFT) found that 50 prominent public schools were in breach of the Competition Act 1998 through their exchange of details of planned fee increases over three academic years 2001–02, 2002–03 and 2003–04. The Independent Schools Council claimed that the investigation had been "a scandalous waste of public money". By 2023, three-quarters of HMC schools were either partially or fully co-educational.

=== Scotland and Ireland ===
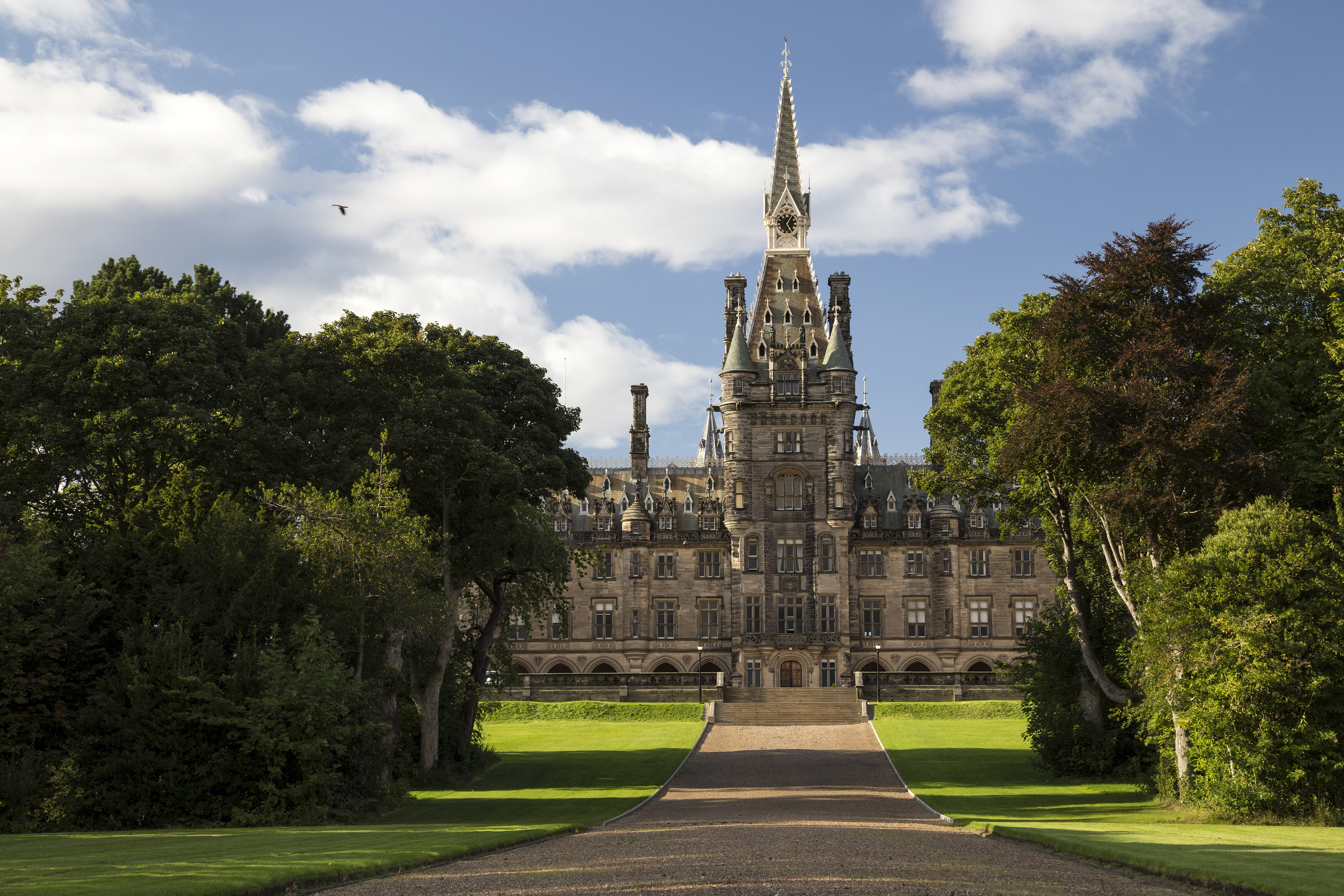
Fettes College, Edinburgh, 1870

By the end of the 19th century the "public school movement", had extended to all parts of the (then) United Kingdom. The 1895 Public School Yearbook included Loretto School (1827), Glenalmond College (1847) and Fettes College (1870).

In Ireland, of the Royal Schools, The Royal School, Armagh 1608 was described as offering an excellent public school education and being the equal of any school in the British Isles. Cork Grammar School 1881 was established for 'the purpose of supplying a great want in Cork—namely, a good public school, and with the object of inducing persons who had been sending their children to England, to educate them at home'. In 2020 6.7% of the school population in the Republic of Ireland attended 'elite' fee charging schools.

=== Overseas expansion ===
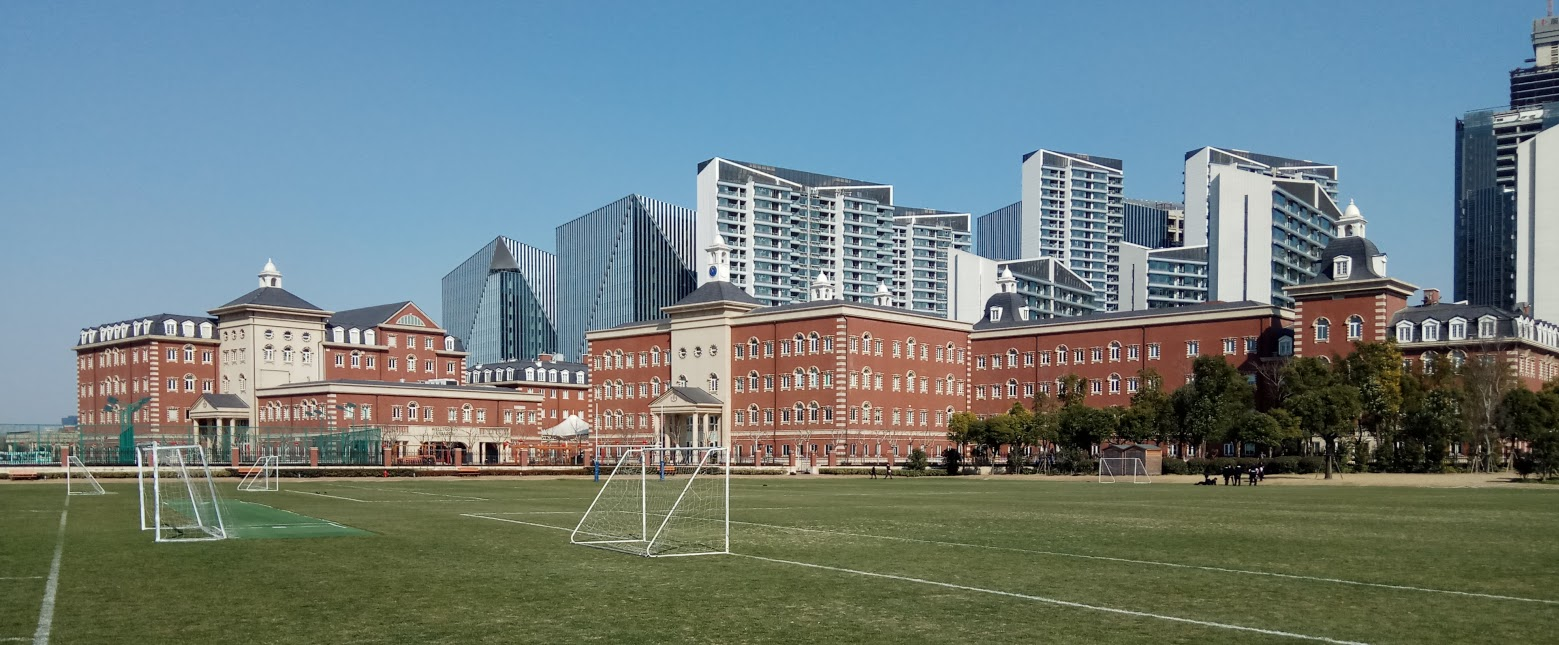
Wellington College International, Shanghai

In 1892 Haileybury alumnus Charles Rendall, founded Haileybury "altera terra" in Melbourne, Australia. In the 20th and 21st centuries, several public schools opened affiliates in other countries, especially the Middle and Far East. The schools are typically founded in partnership with a local business person or organisation with the "home" school maintaining control of curriculum and staffing.

== Curriculum ==
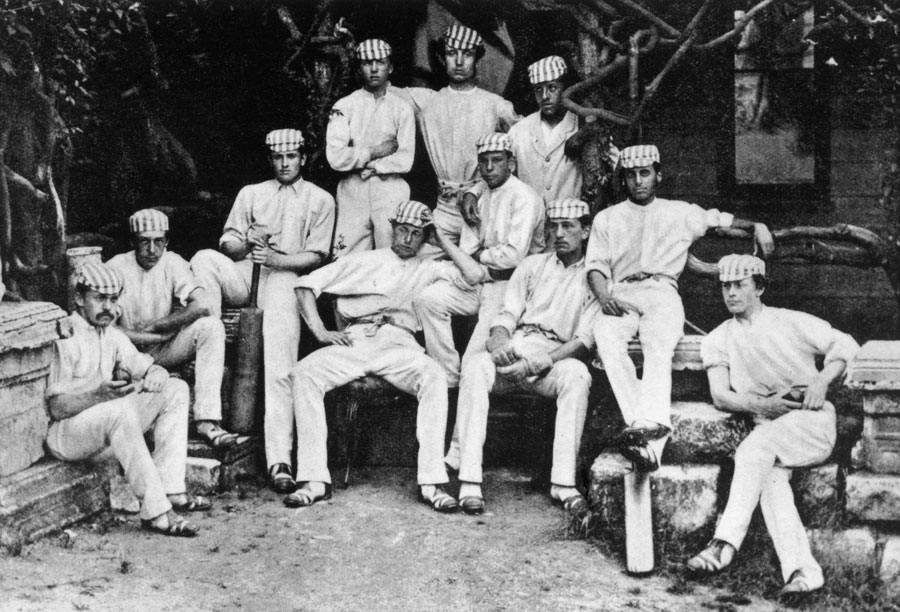
Harrow School Cricket XI of 1869

=== Academic ===
The almost exclusive teaching of grammar (Latin and to a lesser extent ancient Greek) prevailed until well into the 19th century. Most schools were legally obliged to do so by the terms of their original endowment. As a response to the perceived need to modernise such a curriculum in line with commercial needs, the Grammar School Act 1840 was passed. This allowed schools to make an application to a court of law (rather than Parliament) to deviate from the wishes of the original founder and teach "other branches of literature and science". By the end of the 19th century, 'modern' subjects such as mathematics and science featured in many schools listings in The Public Schools Yearbook.

=== Sport ===
Rowing and cricket were important sports since the early 19th century. English public school football games contributed to the development of various codes of football. Rugby football and squash, among other sports, were invented at public schools.

From the 1850s organised games became prominent in the curriculum, based on the precedent set at Rugby by Thomas Arnold, forming a keystone of character development through teamwork, sportsmanship and self-sacrifice. Hely Almond, headmaster at Loretto 1862–1903, encapsulated the thinking of the era in stating "Games in which success depends on the united efforts of many, and which also foster courage and endurance are the very lifeblood of the public school system".

The prominence of team sports prevails to the current day and is a feature by which public schools still distinguish themselves from state maintained schools.

== Charitable status ==
Within English law a charity is defined as an institution established for a charitable purpose and providing a public benefit. The "advancement of education" is a long-standing charitable purpose. The UK's oldest charity is the King's School Canterbury. Charitable status for schools outside of the state maintained sector confers various tax benefits. This means schools are not liable for corporation tax or capital gains tax and receive an 80% reduction in business rates (a local property tax). Donations by individuals to such schools are considered "tax free". Fee-charging schools having the status of charities are not totally tax exempt as they pay some business rates, VAT on procured goods and services and staff pay income tax on earnings. The public benefit that a charity is obliged to provide is not defined in law. Typically schools provide this public benefit by offering bursaries to pupils of families with limited financial means and supporting local state maintained school(s) and institutions, including allowing public access to school facilities.

As of 2020, the nine Clarendon schools had a combined asset value of almost £2bn. Eton College is the school with the largest endowment of over £500m. Charitable status is politically controversial. The UK Labour Party leader Keir Starmer in 2021 pledged to remove charitable status for fee-charging schools, a policy also of Harold Wilson, stated in the 1974 Labour election manifesto. Removal of charitable status would enable the UK government to levy VAT on school fees, a commitment (re)made in the 1983 Labour Party election manifesto under Neil Kinnock's leadership, and revived in 2017 by Jeremy Corbyn. In support of the case for maintaining the status quo, the Independent Schools Council published in 2022 a report which stated that the independent education sector contributed in 2021 £16.5 billion to the UK economy and generated £5.1 billion of tax revenue. The 2019 UK Conservative Party election manifesto made no mention of education outside of the state maintained sector. In September 2023 the UK Labour party announced that, if elected, it planned to allow public schools to retain their charitable status (and some associated tax benefits) but did plan to charge VAT on fees and remove concessions on business rates paid to local authorities.

== Associations with the ruling class ==
The 19th-century public school ethos promoted ideas of service to Crown and Empire, exemplified in tropes such as "Play up! Play up! And play the game!" from Henry Newbolt's 1892 poem Vitaï Lampada and "the Battle of Waterloo was won on the playing fields of Eton", the latter popularly attributed to the Duke of Wellington. Many ex-pupils, like those from other schools, had, and still have, a nostalgic affection for their old schools (George Orwell remembered being "interested and happy" at Eton,) and a public school tie and an "old boy network" of former pupils were useful in advancing a career. The English public school model influenced the 19th-century development of Scottish elite schools, but a tradition of the gentry sharing their primary education with their tenants kept Scotland more egalitarian.

Former Harrow pupil Stanley Baldwin wrote that when he first became Prime Minister in 1923, he wanted to have six Harrovians in his government. "To make a cabinet is like making a jig-saw puzzle fit, and I managed to make my six fit by keeping the post of Chancellor of the Exchequer for myself". Until the First World War, the role of public schools in preparing pupils for the gentlemanly elite meant that such education, particularly in its classical focus and social mannerisms, became a mark of the ruling class. Acceptance of social elitism was reduced by the two world wars, but despite portrayals of the products of public schools as "silly asses" and "toffs", the old system continued well into the 1960s.

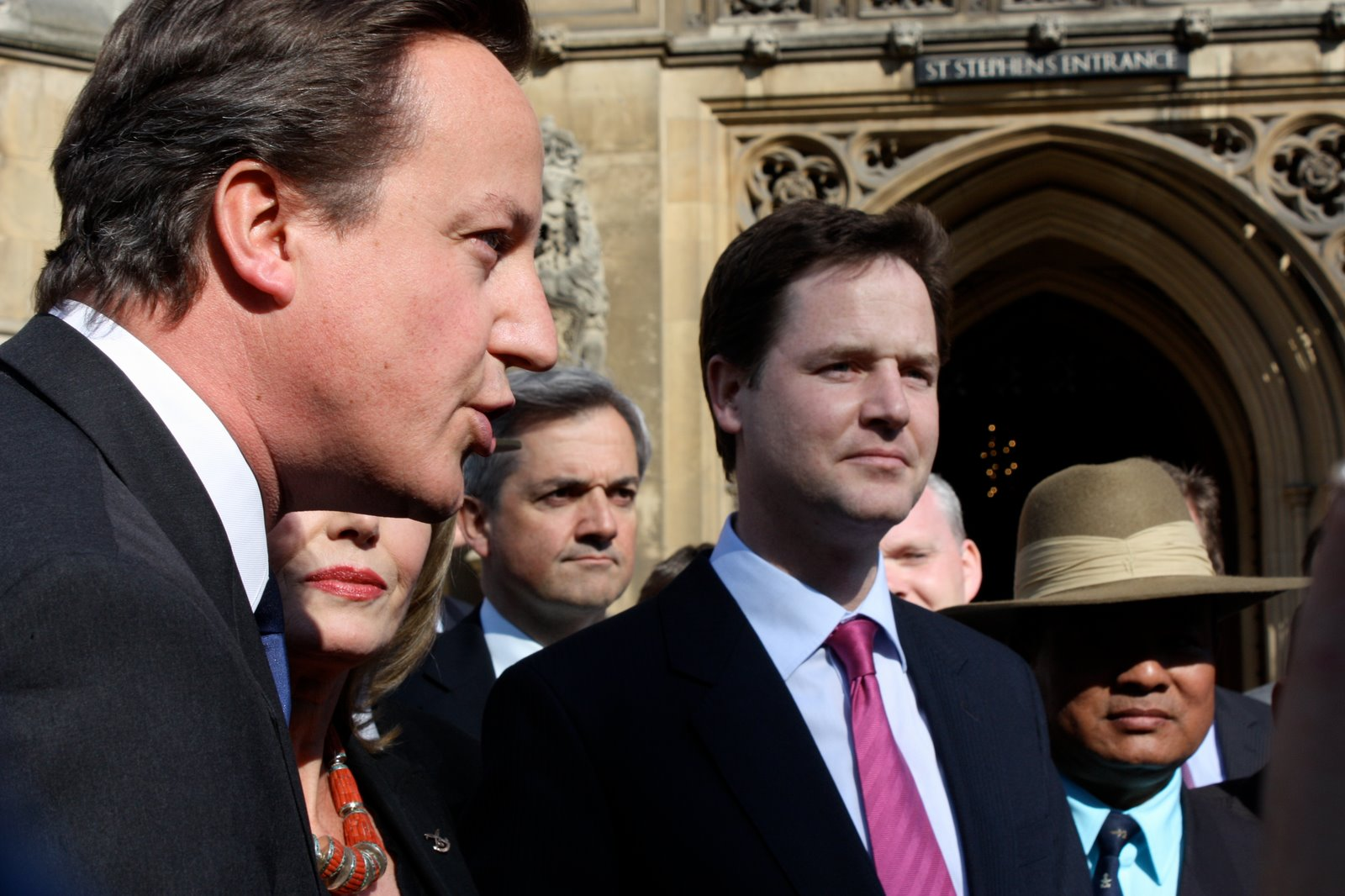
2009 photograph of UK Leader of the Opposition and future Prime Minister David Cameron (left), Lib Dem spokesman and future Secretary of State for Energy and Climate Change Chris Huhne (centre left) and Lib Dem leader and future Deputy Prime Minister Nick Clegg (centre right), all of whom had attended English public schools.

Postwar social change has, however, gradually been reflected across Britain's educational system, while at the same time fears of problems with state education have pushed some parents, who can afford the fees or whose pupils qualify for bursaries or scholarships, towards public schools and other schools in the independent sector. By 2009 typical fees were up to £30,000 per annum for boarders. As of 2019, 20 Prime Ministers had attended Eton.

Conservative former cabinet minister Iain Macleod wrote in 1964 in "The Tory Leadership" that a conspiracy by an Etonian "magic circle" had made Alec Douglas-Home prime minister. The assertion was so powerful that until Cameron, being an Etonian was a disadvantage to becoming a party leader, as Douglas Hurd learned in the 1990 Conservative Party leadership election. While Home had been educated at Eton and the incoming Labour Prime Minister in 1997 (Tony Blair) at Fettes College, all six British Prime Ministers in office between 1964 and 1997 and from 2007 to 2010 were educated at state schools (Harold Wilson, Edward Heath, Margaret Thatcher, and John Major at grammar schools, and James Callaghan and Gordon Brown at other state secondary schools). Theresa May's secondary school education also was primarily in the state sector. Liz Truss was educated at a state comprehensive school.

While members of the aristocracy and landed gentry no longer dominate independent schools, studies have shown that such schools still retain a degree of influence over the country's professional and social elite despite educating less than 10% of the population. A 2012 study published by the Sutton Trust noted that 44% of the 7,637 individuals examined whose names appeared in the birthday lists of The Times, The Sunday Times, The Independent or The Independent on Sunday during 2011 – across all sectors, including politics, business, the arts and the armed forces – were educated at private schools. It also found that 10 elite fee-charging schools (specifically Eton, Winchester, Charterhouse, Rugby, Westminster, Marlborough, Dulwich, Harrow, St Paul's, and Wellington) produced 12% of the leading high-flyers examined in the study. The Social Mobility and Child Poverty Commission came to a similar conclusion in a 2014 study of the professions: 71% of senior judges, 62% of senior armed forces officers, 55% of Whitehall permanent secretaries and 50% of members of the House of Lords had been educated at fee-charging schools.

== Literature and media ==
Public schools have long provided content for artistic and factual media productions:

=== Literature ===
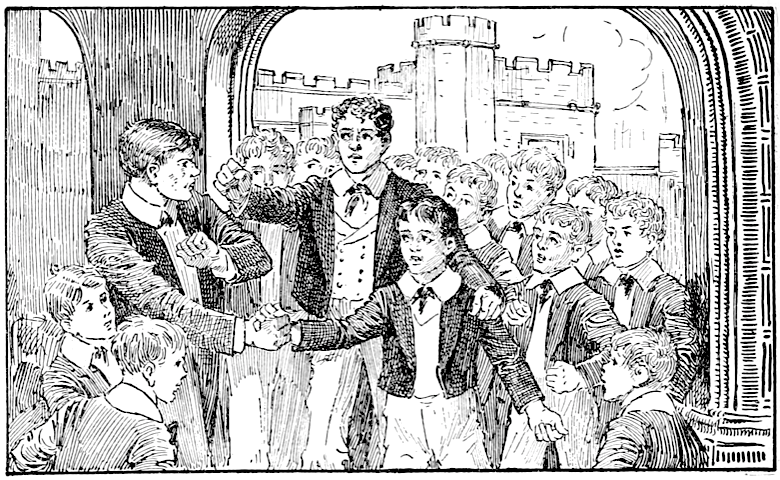
Illustration from Tom Brown's School Days (6th edition of 1911)

Rugby School inspired a whole new genre of literature, i.e. the school story. Thomas Hughes's Tom Brown's School Days, published in 1857 was set there. There were however as many as 90 earlier novels set in British boarding schools, taking as an example just girls' school stories, published between Sarah Fielding's 1749 The Governess, or The Little Female Academy and the seminal 1857 Tom Brown's School Days. Such stories were set in a variety of institutions including private boarding and prep schools as well as public schools. Tom Brown's School Days' influence on the genre of British school novels includes the fictional boarding schools of Talbot Baines Reed's St Dominic's, Rudyard Kipling's Stalky & Co. at "the College", (Note: reputed to be the United Services College) Frank Richards' Billy Bunter at Greyfriars School, James Hilton's Mr Chips at Brookfield, (Note: reputed to be The Leys School) Anthony Buckeridge's Jennings at Linbury Court, (Note: reputed to be based on the author's experience at Seaford College) P. G. Wodehouse's St. Austin's and girls' schools Malory Towers and St. Trinian's. It also influenced J. K. Rowling's Harry Potter series, set at the fictional boarding school Hogwarts. The series' first novel Harry Potter and the Philosopher's Stone has many direct parallels in structure and theme to Tom Brown's School Days. Len Deighton said of his 1962 novel, The IPCRESS File, that it is "about spies on the surface, but it's also really about a grammar school boy among public school boys and the difficulties he faces."

=== Theatre and film ===
In his 1968 play Forty Years On, Alan Bennett used the metaphor of an end-of-term revue at a minor public school to contrast the events of the twentieth century with the routines of public school life. The title alludes to the Harrow school song, "Forty Years On". The 1968 film if...., which satirised the worst elements of English public school life, culminating in scenes of armed insurrection, won the Palme d'Or at the 1969 Cannes Film Festival.

Tom Brown's School Days has been the subject of five cinematic and television productions. Goodbye Mr. Chips has been the subject of three cinematic productions. Ronald Searle's girls' school St Trinian's has featured in seven cinematic productions. The 1942 film A Yank at Eton is a comedy-drama where the protagonist eventually overcomes outdated manners and attitudes. The 1947 stage play and 1950 comedy film The Happiest Days of Your Life, based at fictional minor public school Nutbourne College, were commercial and critical successes. The Guinea Pig, a 1946 stage play and 1948 film, dealt with the experiences of a boy from a modest background being sent to public school. The Browning Version was a 1948 stage play, 1951 film, 1994 film and subject to several television and radio adaptations. A BBC TV series Billy Bunter of Greyfriars School ran from 1952 to 1961. Another Country was a 1981 stage play and 1984 film loosely interpreting the schooldays of Eton-educated spy Guy Burgess.

=== Television documentaries ===
There is an established genre of 'Fly on the wall' television documentaries about schools including British public schools. The BBC broadcast a film on Eton in 1967, and others have followed on public schools including Gordonstoun and Harrow.

== See also ==
- Armorial of UK schools
- Combined Cadet Force
- Direct grant grammar school
- Eton Group, a group of twelve schools within the HMC
- Fagging
- List of SR V "Schools" class locomotives (named principally after public schools)
- List of the oldest schools in the United Kingdom (a number of which are public schools)
- List of English and Welsh endowed schools (19th century) (a number of which are public schools)
- List of direct grant grammar schools (list of schools that were part of the scheme, between 1945 and 1976)
- List of private schools in the United Kingdom
- Private school
- Public Schools Battalions
- Public Schools Club
- Rugby Group, a group of eighteen schools within the HMC
- Toffs and Toughs photograph
