= Titley =

Titley may refer to:

== Places ==
- Titley, Herefordshire, a village
- Titley, Texas, Brewster County, Texas, United States
- Titley Junction railway station in Herefordshire
- Titley Pool, a lake in Herefordshire
- Titley Priory, former property in Herefordshire

== Surname ==
- Alan Titley (born in 1947), Irish novelist and translator
- Albert Titley (1918–1986), English football player
- Craig Titley, American screenwriter
- David Titley, American professor of meteorology
- Edward Titley (1911–1943), English cricket player
- Gary Titley (born in 1950), British Labour politician
- Mark Titley, Welsh rugby player
- Norah M. Titley (1920–2010), British scholar
- Walter Titley (1698–1768), English diplomat

== See also ==
- Gabrielle Laïla Tittley (born 1988), Canadian artist
- Larry Tittley (born 1952), Canadian football league player
