= Old boy network =

Private school alumni social connections

An old boy network (also known as old boys' network, old boys' club) is an informal system in which wealthy men with similar social or educational backgrounds help each other in business or personal matters. The term originally referred to social and business connections among former pupils of male-only elite schools, though the term is now also used to refer to any closed system of relationships that restrict opportunities to within the group. The term originated from much of the British upper-class having attended certain fee-charging public schools as boys, thus former pupils are "old boys".

This can apply to the network between the graduates of a single school regardless of their gender. It is also known as an old boys' society and is similar to an alumni association. It can also mean a network of social and business connections among the alumni of various prestigious schools. In popular language, old boy network or old boys' society has come to be used for the preservation of social elites in general; such connections within the British Civil Service formed a primary theme in the BBC's satirical comedy series Yes Minister. The phrase "It's not what you know, it's who you know" is associated with this tradition.

== Australia ==
In Australia, the term "Old Boy" is used to describe a male alumnus of some prestigious state and private schools. The term "Old Girl" is similarly used for a female alumna of such schools. Both "Old Girl" and "Old Boy" are sometimes used as a reference to someone's parents.

== Canada ==
The term is also used in Canada, where the alumni of such schools as St. Andrew's College, Trinity College School, Ridley College, Crescent School, St George's School, Vancouver College, Stratford Hall, Bishop's College School, Hillfield Strathallan College, Collège Jean-de-Brébeuf, Lower Canada College, and Upper Canada College are known as Old Boys. Other influential private schools with powerful alumni networks may have become co-ed, such as Appleby College or University of Toronto Schools, but operate similarly in which large numbers of alumni all work for the same organization.

== Finland ==
In Finland, the Finnish term hyvä veli -verkosto (literally dear brother network) is used to refer to the alleged informal network of men in high places whose members use their influence to pervert or circumvent official decision-making processes to the members' mutual benefit. As such, the term is pejorative.

The term derives from the salutation "Hyvä veli!", or "Dear brother!", traditionally used to open a letter to a not quite intimate friend. The implication is that since the elites of all fields are drawn from a fairly small pool of people who are mostly more or less acquainted with each other, they can and often do manage public and private affairs amongst themselves, off the record, and outside public scrutiny as they like. As the word "brother" implies, the network is usually presumed to consist of males, and thus the term is also sometimes used to refer to the marginalization of women and their exclusion from high positions in both the public and private spheres. There is an equivalent term, hyvä sisko ("dear sister"), used about informal networks of women in high positions.

President Urho Kekkonen was notable for directly communicating with senior officials (past his cabinets) through letters, which famously began with the salutation "Hyvä veli". These have been published in three volumes.

== Hong Kong ==
The term can also refer to the networks that are set up in the more elite secondary schools, such as Diocesan Boys' School, Queen's College, Ying Wa College, La Salle College and Saint Joseph's College.

== India ==
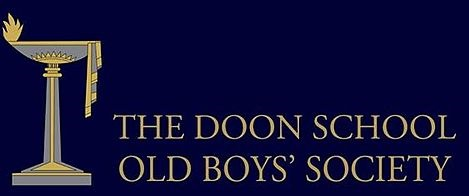
Logo of The Doon School Old Boys' Society

The Doon School maintains its own old boys' society (The Doon School Old Boys' Society) for social connections and fundraising on behalf of the School. Graduates of The Doon School are known as Doscos, or simply, Old Boys.

Former students of the Welham Boys School refer to their society as the Welham Old Boys Society. Though the school was founded in 1937, the society was not founded until 1983. The group is intended to encourage Welham graduates to aid in the school's success through their union; they have established scholarships and bursaries for deserving students. The Welham Old Boys Network has established definite membership criteria, as well as requiring a subscription fee.

Former pupils of Bishop Cotton School are referred to as Old Cottonians. The Old Cottonians Association was started in 1910 when 17 Old Cottonians assembled in the Freemason's Hall in Shimla. The Old Cottonians Association is spread all over the world.

Similarly, the Old Boys of Sainik School Rewa in Madhya Pradesh call their Old Boys Association as "Sainwinians".

Aligarh Muslim University Alumni had established AMU alumni associations all over India and elsewhere.

Some of the other schools to use the term are La Martiniere Calcutta, Calcutta Boys' School, La Martinière College Lucknow, Mayo College, Mayo College Girls School, St. Paul's School Darjeeling, St. Edward's School Shimla, The Lawrence School Sanawar, Bishop Cotton Boys' School.

== New Zealand ==
In New Zealand, many schools maintain old boys/girls/students associations, but the term "old boy network" is typically used about the elite public and private secondary schools such as Auckland Grammar School, King's College, Sacred Heart College, Christ's College and Scots College.

== Switzerland ==
In Switzerland, the term can be used for the networks set up by the alumni organizations of private boarding schools such as Institut Le Rosey, Aiglon College, College Alpin International Beau Soleil, and College du Leman. These elite Swiss private schools are considered to have among the most prestigious alumni registries, with Switzerland having the highest private school fees in the world; these institutions attract the children of royalty, celebrities, political leaders, and business executives. Strong old boys/girls network also exist in private universities, notably École hôtelière de Lausanne and Les Roches International School of Hotel Management.

== United Kingdom ==
In the United Kingdom, the "old boy network" is seen as existing primarily among those educated at the fee-paying independent schools (public schools) of the Eton Group and the Rugby Group including, but not limited to, Charterhouse School, Eton College, Harrow School, Oundle School, Radley College, Rugby School, Sherborne School, Bedford School, Shrewsbury School, Stowe School, Wellington College, Westminster School and Winchester College, as well as at the colleges of Oxford and Cambridge, although to some extent such networks exist for all institutions producing large numbers of "old boys" and girls. The existence of "old boy" networks is often blamed for the high proportion of former pupils of high-status schools and universities in high-status positions in government, business, and other professions. For instance, between them, Harrow and Eton have 26 British prime ministers among their old boys. In practice, attendance at certain educational institutions is typical of the British "ruling class" and upper middle class, and where nepotism exists it may be driven more often by personal relationships than by educational networks.

An organisation called Future First promotes the use of such networks among those educated at state schools.

== United States ==
In the United States, the "Old Boys Network" is a term more focused on the inside track with connections to powerful and ambitious individuals formed through work, professional and community service organizations, and private clubs. However, the original term of being associated with education has sometimes also been used in this context.

Regionally, "good ol' boys" in Dixie are understood to exhibit stereotypically White Southern cultural traits such as political conservatism and stated preference against pretentiousness; their existence as an informal "network" refers to men with these mores who hold positions of local prominence such as small-town lawyers who exhibit favoritism for their social peers.

== See also ==
- Affirmative action
- Alumni association
- Association of Representatives of Old Pupils Societies in the UK
- Blat (favors)
- Collective narcissism
- Cronyism
- Fraternities and sororities
- Guanxi
- In-group bias
- Jeon-gwan ye-u
- Legacy preferences
- Social capital
- White shoe brigade
