= Henry Hughes =

Henry Hughes may refer to:

- Henry Hughes, 19th century British locomotive builder, see Brush Traction
- Henry Hughes (1850s), stained-glass window designer and partner in the firm Ward and Hughes
- Henry Hughes (cricketer) (born 1992), English cricketer
- Henry Hughes (director), American film director
- Henry Hughes (New South Wales politician) (fl. 1850s), Australian politician
- Henry Hughes (horse racing) (1839–1924), race official in South Australia
- Henry Hughes (sociologist) (1829–1862), American lawyer, sociologist, state senator and Confederate officer from Mississippi
- Henry Hughes (Vicar Apostolic of Gibraltar) (1788–1860), Irish-born Roman Catholic bishop and Franciscan friar
- Henry George Hughes (1810–1872), Irish judge and politician
- Henry Kent Hughes (1814–1880), pastoralist and politician in the South Australian House of Assembly
- Henry P. Hughes (1904–1968), American jurist from Wisconsin
- H. Stuart Hughes (1916–1999), American historian, professor, and activist
- Henry Castree Hughes (1893–1976), British architect and conservationist
- Henry Estcourt Hughes (1869–1951), Australian Baptist minister

== See also ==
- Harry Hughes (disambiguation)
- Henry Hewes (disambiguation)
