= Edward Fowler =

Edward Fowler may refer to:

- Edward Fowler (bishop), English bishop
- Edward Fowler (cricketer), English solicitor and cricketer
- Edward Brush Fowler, officer in the Union Army during the American Civil War
