= Rugby Group =

Association of 18 English public schools

- Formation: 1960s
- Members: 18
- Parent organization: Headmasters' and Headmistresses' Conference

The Rugby Group is a group of 18 British public schools.

== History ==
The group was formed in the 1960s as an association of major boarding schools within the Headmasters' and Headmistresses' Conference.

In 2003, as part of a wider investigation into alleged fee fixing at UK independent schools, the Office of Fair Trading published an e-mail exchange between the bursars of Rugby Group schools containing detailed information about planned fee levels at each of the schools. The case was settled in 2006, with 50 schools admitting that such exchange of information "involved a distortion of competition and infringed competition law", but not admitting to any effect on fees. The schools each paid a £10,000 penalty, and agreed to make ex gratia payments totalling £3 million to a trust to benefit pupils attending the schools in the relevant years.

== Structure ==
As with the Eton Group, which was formed a few years later, headmasters and heads of the academic departments meet annually in rotation to discuss matters of common interest.

The schools in the group are:

- Bradfield College, Berkshire
- Charterhouse School, Surrey
- Cheltenham College, Gloucestershire
- Clifton College, Bristol
- Haileybury College, Hertfordshire
- Harrow School, Harrow on the Hill, London
- Malvern College, Worcestershire
- Monkton Combe School, Somerset
- Oundle School, Northamptonshire
- Radley College, Oxfordshire
- Repton School, Derbyshire
- Rugby School, Warwickshire
- St Edward's School, Oxford
- Shrewsbury School, Shropshire
- Stowe School, Buckinghamshire
- Uppingham School, Rutland
- Wellington College, Berkshire
- Winchester College, Hampshire

Five of the Rugby Group, Charterhouse School, Harrow School, Winchester College, Rugby School and Shrewsbury School, were part of the group of nine schools investigated by the Clarendon Commission of 1864 and were subsequently reformed by the Public Schools Act 1868. The other Clarendon schools (Eton College, St Paul's School, Merchant Taylors' School and Westminster School) have other affiliations.
