= John Lees (cricketer) =

English cricketer (1861–1934)

Personal information
- Full name: John Lees
- Born: 5 September 1861; Ashton-under-Lyne, Lancashire, England
- Died: 20 December 1934 (aged 73); Brenchley, Kent, England
- Batting: Right-handed
- Bowling: Right-arm slow

Domestic team information
- Years: Team
- 1881: Cambridge University
- 1897–1899: Cambridgeshire

Career statistics
Competition	First-class
Matches	1
Runs scored	15
Batting average	7.50
100s/50s	–/–
Top score	9
Balls bowled	8
Wickets	0
Bowling average	–
5 wickets in innings	–
10 wickets in match	–
Best bowling	–
Catches/stumpings	–/–
- Source: Cricinfo, 21 July 2019

John Lees (5 September 1861 – 20 December 1934) was an English first-class cricketer.

The son of Samuel Lees, he was born at Ashton-under-Lyne in September 1861. He was educated at Uppingham School, before going up to Jesus College, Cambridge. While at Cambridge, he made a single appearance in first-class cricket for Cambridge University against the Marylebone Cricket Club at Fenner's in 1881. Batting twice in the match, he was dismissed in the Cambridge first-innings by Alfred Shaw for 6 runs, while in their second-innings he was dismissed for 9 runs by Fred Morley. Though he did not gain a blue in cricket, he did gain a rugby blue.

After graduating from Cambridge, Lees attended the Royal Military College, Sandhurst, graduating into the West India Regiment as a second lieutenant in August 1885. He held the rank of lieutenant by November 1887, with Lees serving in the British expedition up the River Gambia against Fodey Kabba in 1891–92, and later serving as a garrison adjutant in British Jamaica. He transferred to the Prince of Wales's Leinster Regiment (Royal Canadians) as a captain in May 1894, before transferring once more to the Royal West Kent Regiment in September of the same year. He played minor counties cricket for Cambridgeshire from 1897–99, making ten appearances in the Minor Counties Championship.

He retired from active service in May 1903, retaining the rank of captain. After retiring he became a farmer, but later returned to the Royal West Kent Regiment to serve during the First World War, in the course of which he was mentioned in dispatches. He died in December 1934 at Brenchley, Kent.
