= William Pershke =

English cricketer (1918–1944)

Personal information
- Full name: William Jack Pershke
- Born: 8 August 1918; Richmond, Surrey, England
- Died: 21 January 1944 (aged 25) at sea
- Batting: Right-handed
- Bowling: Right-arm fast-medium

Domestic team information
- Years: Team
- 1938: Oxford University

Career statistics
Competition	First-class
Matches	8
Runs scored	58
Batting average	11.40
100s/50s	–/–
Top score	17*
Balls bowled	1,494
Wickets	28
Bowling average	26.85
5 wickets in innings	3
10 wickets in match	–
Best bowling	6/46
Catches/stumpings	5/–
- Source: Cricinfo, 11 March 2020

William Jack Pershke (8 August 1918 – 21 January 1944) was an English first-class cricketer and an officer in the Royal Air Force Volunteer Reserve.

Pershke was born at Richmond in August 1918. He was educated at Uppingham School, before going up to Brasenose College, Oxford. While studying at Oxford, he played first-class cricket for Oxford University in 1938, making eight appearances. Playing as a right-arm fast-medium bowler, he took 28 wickets in his eight matches at an average of 26.85. He took five wickets in an innings on three occasions, with best figures of 6 for 46, which he took on debut against Glamorgan. With the bat, he scored a total of 57 runs with a high score of 17 not out.

Pershke served in the Second World War with the Royal Air Force Volunteer Reserve, enlisting as a leading aircraftman in April 1941. He received a commission with the war substantive rank of flight officer in May 1942, before being made a flight lieutenant in May 1943. Flying with No. 105 Operational Training Unit, he was killed when the Wellington he was flying crashed over the sea while on a navigational exercise on 21 January 1944.
