= William Arnold Mathews =

English priest and writer (1839–1925)

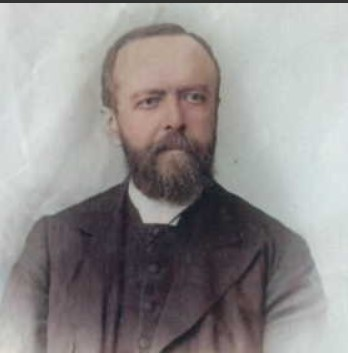
- Born: 11 September 1839
- Died: 27 November 1925 (aged 86)
- Occupation: Anglican Priest
- Period: 1886-1890
- Subject: Guidebook about Appleby, religion and church reform
- Notable works: The National Church of a Christian Nation (1886), Constitutional Church Reform (1886), The Witness of the World to Christ (1889), A Guide Book to Appleby (1890)
- Notable awards: Peek Prize winner in 1873

William Arnold Mathews (1839–1925) was an English priest and writer. He was an honorary canon of Carlisle from 1886 to 1925.

== Childhood and education ==
William Arnold Mathews was born at Park Lane House, Hatfield, Yorkshire, on 11 September 1839. His father, William, was a doctor who had moved from Scotland to Hatfield, where he acquired an estate of 200 acres and served as a JP. His mother, Jane, was the daughter of Thomas Graham Arnold, a doctor.

After being taught by the curate of Ridlington, William attended Uppingham School from April 1855 to 1858, where he was Captain of the School in his final year. In 1858, he entered Corpus Christi College, Oxford. He obtained his BA degree in 1861 and MA in 1864.

== Career ==
In 1862, the Bishop of Lincoln ordained Mathews deacon and licensed him to the curacy of Radford (part of Nottingham), where he served under Rev. Samuel Creswell. In 1863, the same bishop ordained him priest. In July 1865, Hugo Charles Meynell Ingram appointed him Vicar of Laughton, Lincolnshire, a rural parish with a population of about 500. The living was worth £258.

On 11 August 1866, he married Caroline Sarah Georgina Stuart at Kirton-in-Linsey, Lincolnshire. She was the Canadian-born daughter of an East Indian Company official who sent her to England to live with his brother and sister at the vicarage of Kirton-in-Linsey in Lincolnshire. William and Caroline had five sons and four daughters.

When William’s father died in 1869, he left an estate valued at £3,000, a large part of which he bequeathed to his only son. In 1871, William used his inheritance to buy the living of Dacre in the Lake District for £2,000 and appointed himself as the vicar.

He spent the next twenty-five years in northwest England. After six years at Dacre, he and his family spent two in Skelton and four at St Mary’s, Carlisle, before moving to the market town Appleby, in Westmoreland, where they remained for thirteen years.

The diocese rewarded William’s energy and hard work. In 1876, he was appointed the Rural Dean of Greystoke, an office he held for five years. In 1885, he was elected a Proctor in Convocation, a position he held until 1898, and in 1886, he was appointed honorary Canon of Carlisle and Rural Dean of Kirby Stephen and Appleby.

In 1896, wanting to reduce his workload, he accepted his old college’s offer of the Rectory at Bassingham. His wife died the following year.

In 1913, he resigned from the living of Bassingham and became the Vicar of Wendron in Cornwall, where he remained until 1923. He died at 27 Rockcliffe Road, Bathwick, on 27 November 1925, after suffering a heart seizure while returning home from a memorial service to Queen Alexandra at Bath Abbey.

== Publications ==
In 1873, Mathews won £50 in an essay writing competition set by Henry W. Peek MP on "The maintenance of the Church of England as an Established Church." In 1886, he published the essay under the title, The National Church of a Christian Nation. At the same time, he published Constitutional Church Reform. In 1889, he published The Witness of the World to Christ.

Mathews loved nature, local literature and antiquities. In 1890, he published A Guide to Appleby, which passed through several editions. He also wrote several articles for the Cumberland and Westmorland Antiquarian and Archaeological Society, including a history of St Lawrence's Church, Appleby.
