= Harry Hughes (disambiguation) =

Harry Hughes (1926–2019) was an American politician.

Harry Hughes may also refer to:

- Harry Hughes (Australian footballer) (1876–1929), Australian footballer
- Harry Hughes (director), British film director and screenwriter
- Harry Hughes (footballer, born 1929) (1929–2013), English former footballer
- Harry W. Hughes (1887–1953), American football player, coach and college athletics administrator
- Harry Hughes (javelin thrower) (born 1997), British javelin thrower

== See also ==
- Henry Hughes (disambiguation)
- Harold Hughes (1922–1996), Governor of Iowa
