= Henry Hewes =

Henry Hewes may refer to:

- Henry Hewes (critic) (1917–2006), American theater writer for Saturday Review
- Henry Hewes (politician) (born 1949), American activist, son of above

== See also ==
- Henry Hughes (disambiguation)
