= The Stagg Inn =

Coordinates: 52.2322°N 2.9831°W

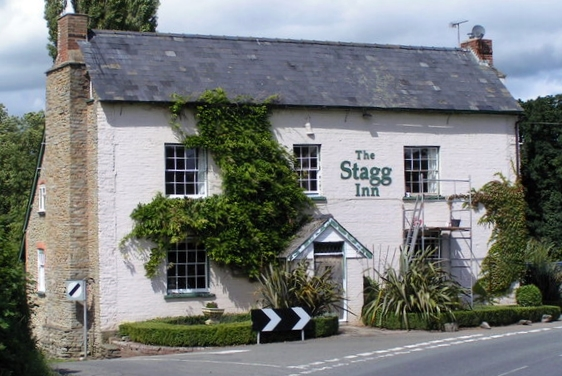
- Interactive map of The Stagg Inn

Restaurant information
- Rating: (Michelin Guide 2015)
- Location: Titley, Herefordshire, England

The Stagg Inn is a restaurant located in Titley, Herefordshire, England. As of 2015, the restaurant holds one star in the Michelin Guide. The Stagg was the first pub to be awarded a Michelin star in 2001.

The Stagg Inn also offers accommodation, in the pub and at the Old Vicarage, just down the road.
