= Endowed Schools Act 1869 =

Act of the Parliament of the United Kingdom

Endowed Schools Act 1869 (Note: Section 1. Due to the repeal of that provision it is now authorised by section 19(2) of the Interpretation Act 1978.)
- Act of Parliament
- Parliament of the United Kingdom
- Long title: An Act to amend the Law relating to Endowed Schools and other Educational Endowments in England, and otherwise to provide for the Advancement of Education.
- Citation: 32 & 33 Vict. c. 56
- Territorial extent: England and Wales (Note: Section 2.)

Dates
- Royal assent: 2 August 1869
- Commencement: 2 August 1869 (Note: Section 3.)
- Repealed: 18 April 1973
Other legislation
| Amended by | Charities Act 1960 |
| Repealed by | Education Act 1973 |
| Relates to | Public Schools Act 1868 |

Status: Repealed

Text of statute as originally enacted

The Endowed Schools Act 1869 (32 & 33 Vict. c. 56) was an act of the Parliament of the United Kingdom. It was one of the Endowed Schools Acts 1869 to 1948. It was passed during William Ewart Gladstone’s first ministry, to restructure endowed grammar schools in England and Wales (one jurisdiction).

Firstly the Clarendon Commission investigated nine leading schools which led to the Public Schools Act 1868 (31 & 32 Vict. c. 118) which restructured the trusts of seven of them. Then the Schools Enquiry Commission (the 'Taunton Commission') was appointed to examine the remaining 782 endowed grammar schools. The commission reported that the distribution of schools did not match the current population, and that provision varied greatly in quality, with provision for girls being particularly limited. The commission proposed the creation of a national system of secondary education by restructuring the endowments of these schools for modern purposes. The Endowed Schools Act 1869 created the Endowed Schools Commission, with extensive powers over endowments of individual schools. It was said that the commission "could turn a boys' school in Northumberland into a girls' school in Cornwall". Across England and Wales, schools endowed to offer free classical instruction to boys were remodelled as fee-paying schools (with a few competitive scholarships) teaching broad curricula to boys or girls.

The act also finally removed the requirement for grammar school teachers to have a license to teach issued by a Church of England Bishop or Ordinary, which had been formalised by the 77th Canon of the Anglican Book of Common Prayer 1604 edition.

== Example: The St Pancras land ==
In the late 1860s, land in St Pancras, left by Richard Platt as the endowment of Aldenham School, was compulsorily purchased as the site of the new St Pancras railway station, and the Midland Railway had to pay compensation of £91,000, equivalent to £9,365,177 in 2025. The Endowed Schools Commissioners, acting under the Endowed Schools Act 1869, diverted more than half of this money to other schools. In their scheme approved in 1875, £20,000 went to the North London Collegiate School and Camden School for Girls, £13,333 to Watford Grammar School for Boys, £10,000 to Russell Lane School, Southgate, and £8,000 to two elementary schools, Medburn School, Radlett, and Delrow School, Aldenham. The Aldenham headmaster of the time, Alfred Leeman, called this "a violent act of confiscation".

== Subsequent developments ==
The whole act was repealed by sections 1(1)(b) of, and part II of schedule 2 to, the Education Act 1973, which came into force on 18 April 1973.

== See also ==
- List of English and Welsh endowed schools (19th century)
