= John Hare (cricketer) =

English cricketer and educator

Personal information
- Full name: John Hugh Montague Hare
- Born: 31 May 1857; Docking, Norfolk, England
- Died: 1 August 1935 (aged 78); Docking, Norfolk, England
- Batting: Right-handed
- Bowling: Right-arm medium

Domestic team information
- Years: Team
- 1879–1880: Oxford University

Career statistics
Competition	First-class
Matches	8
Runs scored	126
Batting average	11.45
100s/50s	–/–
Top score	38*
Balls bowled	28
Wickets	1
Bowling average	12.00
5 wickets in innings	–
10 wickets in match	–
Best bowling	1/5
Catches/stumpings	6/–
- Source: Cricinfo, 5 May 2020

John Hugh Montague Hare (31 May 1857 – 1 August 1935) was an English first-class cricketer and educator.

The son of Hugh James Hare, he was born in May 1857 at Docking Hall at Docking, Norfolk. He was educated at Uppingham School, before going up Exeter College, Oxford. While studying at Oxford, he played first-class cricket for Oxford University, making his debut against the Gentlemen of England at Oxford in 1879. He played first-class cricket for Oxford until 1880, making a total of eight appearances. In his eight matches, Hare scored a total of 126 runs at an average of 11.45 and with a high score of 38 not out. His county cricket was for Norfolk, for whom he played minor matches for until 1890.

After graduating from Oxford, he became a master at both Winchester College and Eton College. Hare died at Docking Hall in August 1935.
