= Mr. Chips (disambiguation) =

Mr. Chips is the central character in the 1934 novella Goodbye, Mr. Chips and its adaptations.

Mr. Chips may also refer to:

- Mr. Chips (album), a 1984 album by Hank Crawford
- Mr Chips, the mascot of the British game show Catchphrase

== See also ==
- Goodbye, Mr. Chips (disambiguation)
