= Norman Knight (English cricketer) =

English cricketer and colonial administrator

Personal information
- Full name: Norman Spencer Knight
- Born: 30 March 1914; Eltham, Kent, England
- Died: 30 May 2009 (aged 95); Berea, KwaZulu-Natal, South Africa
- Batting: Left-handed
- Role: Wicket-keeper

Domestic team information
- Years: Team
- 1933–1935: Oxford University

Career statistics
Competition	First-class
Matches	11
Runs scored	189
Batting average	13.50
100s/50s	–/1
Top score	87
Catches/stumpings	18/5
- Source: Cricinfo, 18 June 2020

Norman Spencer Knight (30 March 1914 – 30 May 2009) was an English first-class cricketer and colonial administrator.

Knight was born at Eltham in March 1914. He began his early education in Eastbourne at St Andrew's Prep, from which he gained a scholarship to Uppingham School. He excelled in Eton Fives at Uppingham, in which he was public schools champion in 1932. From Uppingham he went up to Wadham College, Oxford. While studying at Oxford, he played first-class cricket for Oxford University, making his debut against Leicestershire in 1933. He played first-class cricket for Oxford until 1935, making eleven appearances. Playing as a wicket-keeper, he scored 189 runs in his eleven matches, at an average of 13.50 and with a high score of 87, which was his only score above fifty. Behind the stumps he took 18 catches and made five stumpings. He gained a blue in cricket and a half-blue in Eton Fives.

After graduating from Oxford, he joined the Colonial Service. He was initially stationed in Northern Rhodesia, before being transferred to Barotseland, close to the border with Portuguese Angola. When the Second World War began, he was stationed in the Kalabo near the Zambezi. At the declaration of war he walked 50 miles (80 km) to Mongu before flying to Lusaka, where he joined the Northern Rhodesia Regiment. Knight saw action during the war against the Italians during their Invasion of British Somaliland, with Knight taking part in the Battle of Tug Argan. With the British defeat in the campaign, the regiment was transferred to British Ceylon, to defend against a possible Japanese invasion. Following the war, he returned to Northern Rhodesia where he became private secretary to Governor Sir John Waddington in 1947, the same year in which he helped to organise the royal visit of George VI. He became district commissioner of Mumbwa in 1949 and later held senior positions in the Northern Rhodesia Government. Knight retired to Durban, where he died in May 2009. He was predeceased by his wife, Babs, who died in 2007.
