= Thomas Ridley (cricketer) =

English cricketer, barrister, and clergyman

Personal information
- Full name: Thomas Glynn Ridley
- Born: 20 July 1858; Cullercoats, Northumberland, England
- Died: 20 June 1945 (aged 86); Sea Point, Cape Province, South Africa
- Batting: Right-handed
- Bowling: Right-arm roundarm slow

Career statistics
Competition	First-class
Matches	1
Runs scored	33
Batting average	16.50
100s/50s	–/–
Top score	32
Catches/stumpings	–/–
- Source: Cricinfo, 6 August 2019

Thomas Glynn Ridley (20 July 1858 – 30 June 1945) was an English first-class cricketer, barrister and clergyman.

The second son of Thomas Ridley, he was born at Cullercoats in July 1858. He was educated at Uppingham School, before going up to Exeter College, Oxford. Though he did not play first-class cricket for Oxford University while studying there, he did feature in one first-class match for the Gentlemen of England against Oxford University at Oxford in 1880. Batting twice in the match, he was dismissed for 32 runs in the Gentlemen of England first-innings by George Robinson, while in their second-innings he was dismissed for a single run by the same bowler. He graduated from Oxford in 1883. A student of Lincoln's Inn, he was called to the bar in 1884. He later took holy orders and became a reverend. He died in South Africa at Sea Point, near Cape Town, in June 1945.
