= Dan Everard =

Daniel Henry Stirling Everard (6 October 1946 - 29 August 2026) was a British inventor, design engineer and author. He authored the Bang and Olufsen Book of Hi-fi and developed an elevating powerchair in the early eighties.

== Early life ==
Born to Harry Stirling Crawfurd Everard MBE and Eileen Eunice (née Mander) in Radlett, Herts, Everard was educated at Uppingham School. He matriculated at Wadham College, Oxford to read Engineering Sciences in 1965.

== Career ==
After working at Cambridge Consultants and Neve Electronics Everard founded Cambridge Electronic Workshop (CEW) and became a freelance designer working on instrumentation in 1973. He wrote the Bang and Olufson Book of Hi-Fi for non technical enthusiasts in 1977.

In 1981, Everard’s infant daughter Ruth was diagnosed with Spinal muscular atrophy (SMA) and he created his original idea for a pædiatric powered chair in April of that year. His daughter had her first drive in the new powerchair aged twenty months, and began using it just before she was two years old. The original prototype is on display in the Wellcome Medicine Galleries at the London Science Museum.

This early machine, known as “The Yellow Peril” was then developed into a production version named “The Turbo”. This product was manufactured throughout the 1980s and a later version is held in the Science Museum collection in London.

In the early nineties, the companies behind the Turbo closed and Everard spent his time supporting Turbo owners and developing a new PowerChair to replace his daughter's. The Dragon was born and a new company was founded in 2003 and incorporated as a limited company in 2005 with its name formally changed to DragonMobility at that time. At this time a new, smaller powerchair - the SnapDragon was developed for children weighing less than 40kg.

In 2013, Everard was nominated for the Queen Elizabeth Prize for Engineering, which was won by Robert Kahn, Vinton Cerf, Louis Pouzin, Tim Berners-Lee, and Marc Andreessen for their work creating the Internet and the World Wide Web.
