= Tristan Ballance =

English cricketer and British Army officer

Personal information
- Full name: Tristan George Lance Ballance
- Born: 21 April 1916; Norwich, Norfolk, England
- Died: 4 December 1943 (aged 27); Naples, Campania, Italy
- Batting: Right-handed
- Bowling: Slow left-arm orthodox

Domestic team information
- Years: Team
- 1932–1939: Norfolk
- 1935–1937: Oxford University

Career statistics
Competition	First-class
Matches	23
Runs scored	190
Batting average	9.50
100s/50s	–/1
Top score	63
Balls bowled	4,238
Wickets	61
Bowling average	30.73
5 wickets in innings	2
10 wickets in match	–
Best bowling	5/30
Catches/stumpings	18/–
- Source: Cricinfo, 17 July 2019

Tristan George Lance Ballance MC (21 April 1916 – 4 December 1943) was an English first-class cricketer and British Army officer. Ballance attended the University of Oxford, where he played first-class cricket for Oxford University Cricket Club from 1935–37. After graduating he became a schoolteacher, before serving in the Second World War with the Durham Light Infantry. He died of wounds sustained in action in December 1943, three months after being decorated with the Military Cross.

== Early life and first-class cricket ==
Son to Sir Hamilton Ashley Ballance and his wife, Ruth Ballance (née Barrett), he was born at Norwich in April 1916. He was educated at Uppingham School, before going up to Brasenose College, Oxford. While studying at Oxford, he made his debut in first-class cricket for Oxford University against Worcestershire at Oxford in 1935. He made nine appearances for Oxford in 1935, taking 27 wickets at an average of 35.96, with best figures of 5 for 30. He gained his blue in his debut season. A generally expensive bowler, Ballance lost his place in the Oxford side during the 1936 season, making just three appearances. He regained his place in the Oxford side for the 1937 season, making ten appearances and taking 28 wickets at an average of 27.12, with best figures of 5 for 42. Ballance made a total of 23 first-class appearances for Oxford, taking 61 wickets with his slow left-arm orthodox bowling, at an average of 30.73. A tailend batsman, Ballance scored 190 runs and had one innings of note, making 63 against Leicestershire in 1936.

In addition to playing first-class cricket, Ballance also played minor counties cricket for Norfolk from 1932–39, making fifty appearances in the Minor Counties Championship. After graduating from Oxford, he became a schoolteacher at Brighton College. While teaching at the college he was commissioned as a second lieutenant in the college contingent of the Officers' Training Corps.

== Second world war service ==
Ballance served in the Second World War with the 16th Battalion, Durham Light Infantry (DLI), being commissioned in May 1940. His service number was 73434. He was awarded the Military Cross (MC) for gallant and distinguished service with 16 DLI during the Battle of Sedjenane, in early March 1943, at which point he held the temporary rank of captain. His was the 16th Battalion Durham Light Infantry's first Military Cross of the war. He took part in the Italian Campaign, landing at Salerno with 16 DLI in September 1943. He died of wounds sustained in actions against the Winter Line near Monte Cassino on 4 December 1943. He was buried at the Minturno War Cemetery. His elder brother, Ivor, had been killed the previous year while serving with the Royal Naval Volunteer Reserve aboard HMS Trinidad.
