= Goodbye, Mr. Chips (disambiguation) =

Goodbye, Mr. Chips is a 1934 novella by James Hilton.

Goodbye, Mr. Chips may also refer to:

- Goodbye, Mr. Chips (1939 film) film starring Robert Donat, Greer Garson and directed by Sam Wood
- Goodbye, Mr. Chips (1969 film) film starring Peter O'Toole, Petula Clark and directed by Herbert Ross

== See also ==
- Mr. Chips (disambiguation)
