= Norah M. Titley =

British scholar (1920–2010)

Norah M. Titley (1920–2010) was a British scholar of Persian manuscripts and miniature painting from Persia, India and Turkey.

Titley joined the Department of Oriental Manuscripts at the British Museum from 1950. Shifting with her department to the British Library as that institution emerged in the 1970s, she retired from service in 1983.

The product of many years of study, Titley's most celebrated work was a translation and comprehensive analysis of the Ni'matnāmah published in 2005.

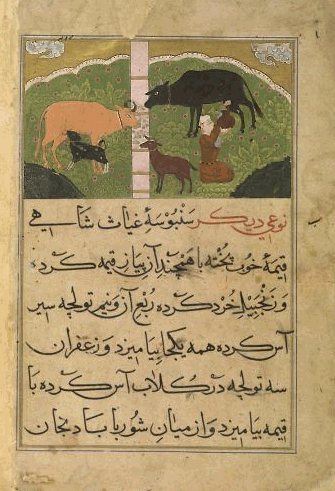
Page from the Ni'matnāmah, produced in Mandu at the turn of the sixteenth century. British Library, IO Islamic 149.

== Publications ==
Titley, Norah M. and the Department of Oriental Antiquities, British Museum (1977). Miniatures from Persian Manuscripts : a Catalogue and Subject Index of Paintings from Persia, India and Turkey in the British Library and the British Museum. London: British Museum Publications.

Titley, Norah M. (1978). A Khamsa of Niz̤āmī dated Herat, 1421. The British Library Journal, 4, no. 2, pp. 161–186. http://www.jstor.org/stable/42554074

Titley, Norah M. (1979). "Plants and gardens in Persian, Mughal, and Turkish art". British Library Booklets.

Titley, Norah M. (1981). Miniatures from Turkish Manuscripts. A Catalogue and Subject Index of Paintings in the British Library and British Museum. London: The British Library.

Titley, Norah M. (1983). Persian Miniature Painting and Its Influence on the Art of Turkey and India: The British Library Collections. London: The British Library Reference Division. Reviewed in Review of Middle East Studies 19, no. 1 (1985), pp. 115–116. DOI: https://doi.org/10.1017/S0026318400015285 and

Titley, Norah M. and Frances Wood (1991) Oriental gardens. London: The British Library. Reviewed in Journal of the Royal Asiatic Society 3, no. 2 (1993), p. 320. DOI: https://doi.org/10.1017/S1356186300004806

Titley, Norah M. (2005) The Niʻmatnāma Manuscript of the Sultans of Mandu : the Sultan’s Book of Delights. (London: RoutledgeCurzon).
