= Edward Fowler (cricketer) =

English cricketer, solicitor

Personal information
- Full name: Edward Richard Fowler
- Born: 28 October 1971 (age 55); Northampton, Northamptonshire, England
- Batting: Right-handed
- Bowling: Right-arm medium

Domestic team information
- Years: Team
- 1993: Oxford University

Career statistics
Competition	First-class
Matches	2
Runs scored	19
Batting average	6.33
100s/50s	–/–
Top score	9
Catches/stumpings	–/–
- Source: Cricinfo, 17 April 2020

Edward Richard Fowler (born 28 October 1971) is an English solicitor and former first-class cricketer.

Fowler was born at Northampton in October 1971. He was educated at Uppingham School, before going up to St Peter's College, Oxford. While studying at Oxford, he made two appearances in first-class cricket for Oxford University in 1993, at Oxford against Hampshire and Middlesex. After graduating from Oxford, he was admitted to practice as a solicitor in 1998 and later became a partner at Northampton law firm Scott Fowler. In January 2020, he was fined £17,500 by the Solicitors Disciplinary Tribunal after he was found to have failed to warn investors involved in an off-plan property development which subsequently became insolvent.
