= Association of Representatives of Old Pupils Societies =

AROPS – The Schools' Alumni Association, formerly the Association of Representatives of Old Pupils Societies, is a United Kingdom-based organisation for representatives of school alumni associations and professional alumni teams. Founded in 1971, the association provides a forum for the exchange of views and experience among alumni organisations connected with independent and state schools in the United Kingdom and overseas. Its membership includes schools providing secondary education, including day, boarding, single-sex, co-educational and preparatory schools.

== History ==
The Association of Representatives of Old Boys' Societies was started by M.E.C. Comer of the Old Johnian Society at an inaugural meeting in December 1971. Its objectives were "to provide a forum for the exchange of views and experience between representatives of old boys' societies". It was originally envisaged that only members of the Headmasters Conference would join.

In 1978 the title was altered to its present form to bring girls' and co-ed schools into the fold. More recently societies from preparatory schools have joined. Today more than 260 schools are represented and membership is open to all schools providing secondary education.

== Annual conference ==
Each May AROPS holds a whole day conference. Venues vary from year to year and are chosen with regard to geographical location and differing type of school—day boarding, co-educational or single-sex.

Each conference is divided into four sessions which aim to cover a wide range of topics that will be of assistance and interest to society representatives.

== Annual general meeting ==
The AROPS annual general meeting (AGM) is held on a weekday evening in October at a school in the London area and is followed by a buffet supper.

== Local networking meetings ==
A number of local networking meetings are held around the country during the course of the year enabling members to meet informally to discuss matters of concern.

== See also ==
- Headmasters' and Headmistresses' Conference
