= Titley, Herefordshire =

Village in Herefordshire, England

Coordinates: 52°14′N 2°59′W

Titley
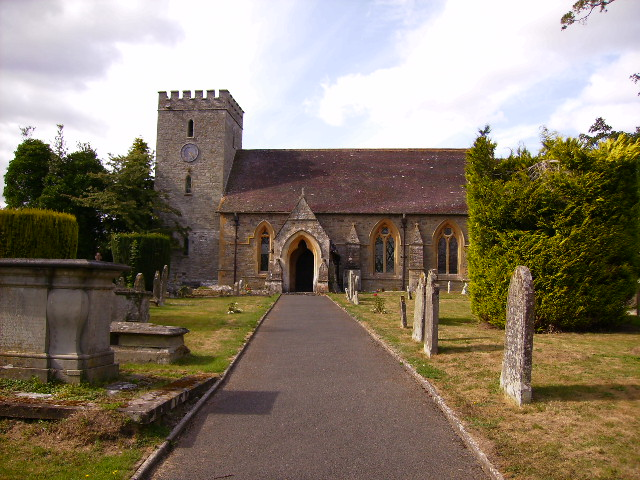
- St Peter's Church, Titley

- Location within Herefordshire
- Population: 261 (2011 Census)
- Unitary authority: Herefordshire
- Shire county: Herefordshire
- Region: West Midlands
- Country: England
- Sovereign state: United Kingdom
- Post town: Kington
- Postcode district: HR5
- Police: West Mercia
- Fire: Hereford and Worcester
- Ambulance: West Midlands
- UK Parliament: North Herefordshire

Titley is a village and civil parish in Herefordshire, England. It lies on the B4355 between Kington and Presteigne.

In the 2001 census the parish had a population of 167, increasing to 261 at the 2011 Census.

The name, recorded in the Domesday Book as Titelege, is Old English and apparently means "woodland clearing of a man called Titta".

== History ==
The village of Titley has been occupied for over a thousand years and there is evidence of a pre-conquest priory in the village originally dedicated to an obscure Welsh saint and later subordinate to the abbey of Tiron in France.

Titley lies at the junction of two drovers' roads and a local pub was, at one time, used for the weighing of wool.

== Buildings ==
Titley's parish church, dedicated to Saint Peter was rebuilt in 1869. The Stagg Inn, known as The Balance until 1833, became in 2001 the first pub in the United Kingdom to be awarded a Michelin Star.

Eywood House was built just west of the village in 1705. A landscaped park was laid out around the house, and an existing kettle lake, Titley Pool, was enlarged. The house was demolished in 1958. Titley Pool is now a nature reserve.

Titley village hall is situated directly behind The Stagg Inn and is available for hire, as well as being regularly used by the parish council and other local organisations such as the WI, Scouts & Brownies, garden and bowls clubs.

== Titley Junction railway station ==
A mile-long section of the former Leominster and Kington Railway was reopened in 2005. Known as The Kingfisher Line, the section is privately owned and is open to the public only by prior arrangement.
