= Eton Group =

Association of 12 English public schools

- Members: 12
- Parent organization: Headmasters' and Headmistresses' Conference

The Eton Group is an association of 12 English public schools within the Headmasters' and Headmistresses' Conference. The Eton Group schools often cooperate with each other, organising events and school matches. For example, the Heads of academic departments meet to discuss curriculum matters of common interest. The Headteachers and the Bursars also meet from time to time. Unlike the older Rugby Group, which contains only boarding schools, the Eton Group includes both boarding schools outside of London and London schools taking day pupils.

The 12 Eton Group schools are:

- Bryanston School, Dorset
- Dulwich College, Dulwich, London
- Eton College, Berkshire
- Highgate School, Highgate, London
- King's College School, Wimbledon, London
- Marlborough College, Wiltshire
- Sherborne School, Dorset
- St Paul's School, Barnes, London
- The King's School, Canterbury, Kent
- Tonbridge School, Kent
- University College School, Hampstead, London
- Westminster School, Westminster, London

In 2003, following an investigation by The Sunday Times into the Eton Group and other schools, the Office of Fair Trading launched an investigation into alleged fee-fixing at independent schools. The bursar of Eton College, Andrew Wynn, was quoted as saying: "We do meet and talk about fees to get some idea of what other schools are thinking. We are a co-operative bunch and we are not out to slit each other's throats." The Independent Schools Council said independent schools were following long-established practice and were not aware that the Competition Act 1998 (on which they were not consulted) had removed their previous exemption from anti-cartel rules.

The OFT concluded in 2005 that 50 schools, including seven in the Eton Group, had exchanged detailed information about planned fee levels in a survey coordinated by Sevenoaks School. The case was settled in 2006, with the schools admitting that such exchange of information "involved a distortion of competition and infringed competition law", but not admitting to any effect on fees. The schools each paid a £10,000 penalty, and agreed to make ex-gratia payments totalling £3 million to a trust to benefit pupils attending the schools in the relevant years.
