= Henry Hughes (horse racing) =

Australian horse racing official

Henry Hughes (23 July 1839 – 2 July 1924) was a horse racing official in South Australia.

== History ==
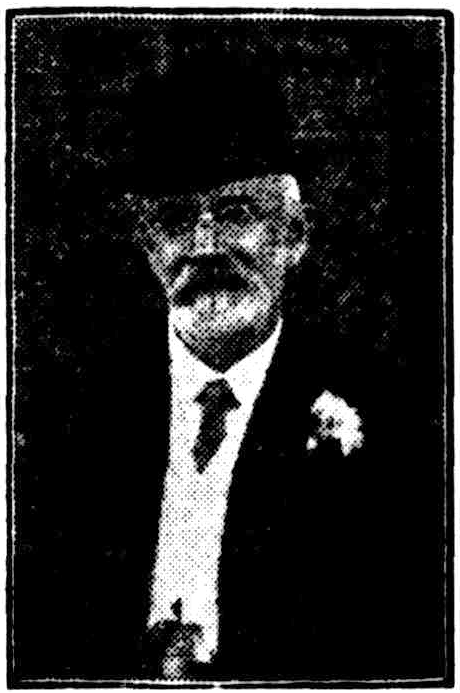
Henry Hughes

Hughes was born in Leighton Buzzard, Bedfordshire, a younger son of Jabez Hughes fellmonger and tanner. In late 1849 he sailed with his parents on the Lord Stanley for Adelaide, arriving on 11 February 1850. He attended E. W. Wickes's (died 1868) school in North Adelaide and later began working for George Aldridge's (died 1879) bakery and grocery business, then helped out at his brother William's butcher shop (Whittle & Hughes) adjacent, in Kensington. (Note: William Hughes killed himself 11 June 1863 by gunshot, shortly after his cart collided with another, causing the death of its driver, George Grosse. An inquest did not attach blame to either man. Hughes's sister Mary died age 22 on 31 December 1858, and his father, Jabez Hughes, died aged 56 on 9 January 1861.) He next "went bush", droving sheep for the Angorichina Run, then droving cattle for the Chambers brothers at Wirrialpa, when Tom Coffin was manager. Hughes managed John Scott's Illanawortina Run from around 1862 to the end of May 1863, and while there organised, with J. H. Howe and Bedford Hack (died 1912), a two-day race meeting at Mudlapina, a station previously owned by John Baker.

Shortly after this meeting he left for Adelaide to join his brother in business in Adelaide. The latter's death occurring a few weeks after, he eventually carried on the business. Having developed a taste for horse racing, he was soon busy with Gabriel Bennett, W. H. Formby, William Blackler, and others of the Adelaide Racing Club, in arranging race meetings as committeeman, steward, judge, starter, clerk of scales, and handicapper. He was starter at the first races held at Morphettville. In 1875 he took up handicapping in a voluntary capacity, and in 1877 became a paid official, and from 1892 was strictly devoted to handicapping. He was present at every Adelaide Cup, Goodwood Handicap, A.R.C. Birthday Cup, and City Handicap until 1917.

Suffering chronic illness, he resigned his various duties as handicapper in 1913, but continued to attend race meetings as long as he was physically able. He died at his residence in Kent Town.

== Other interests ==
Hughes was an enthusiastic bowler, one of the early members of the Adelaide Bowling Club, also a member of the Adelaide Oval Club.

He was a councillor for the Kensington and Norwood Corporation, and mayor for two years; he was also a councillor of the Burnside Council and its chairman.

== Family ==
Hughes married Sarah Ann Stevens (c. 1841 – 1 October 1913) on 26 October 1864. She was the eldest daughter of George Stevens and a niece of John Stevens, proprietor of the old South Australian Company Mill, at Hackney. Their children include:

- Sarah Mary "Pollie" Hughes (1865–1958) married Alfred Percy Birks on 28 August 1889, lived at "Wendouree", Clare. Alfred was a grandson of George Vause Birks.
- Maria Ellen "Ellie" Hughes (1867–1952) married Frank Sidney Bleechmore on 3 October 1889, lived at Watson avenue, Rose Park
- Henry Arthur Hughes (1869–1942), of Savings Bank
- William Charles Hughes (1870–1958), handicapper and a director of Wilkinson & Co. Ltd
- George Edwin Hughes (1874–1954), of Henley Beach
