= Henry Hughes (cricketer) =

English cricketer (born 1992)

Personal information
- Full name: Henry Christopher David Hughes
- Born: 11 September 1992 (age 34); Manchester, Lancashire, England
- Height: 5 ft 9 in (1.75 m)
- Batting: Right-handed

Domestic team information
- Years: Team
- 2015: Oxford MCCU

Career statistics
Competition	First-class
Matches	2
Runs scored	7
Batting average	1.75
100s/50s	–/–
Top score	4
Catches/stumpings	1/–
- Source: Cricinfo, 16 July 2020

Henry Christopher David Hughes (born 11 September 1992) is an English former first-class cricketer.

Hughes was born at Manchester and was educated at Uppingham School, where he captained the school cricket team, before going up to Oxford Brookes University. While studying at Oxford Brookes, he made two appearances in first-class cricket for Oxford MCCU in 2015, playing at Oxford against Worcestershire and Middlesex. (Note: Oxford MCCU differed from Oxford University Cricket Club in that it was open to students at Oxford Brookes University, whereas Oxford University Cricket Club is exclusively for students of the constituent colleges of the University of Oxford.) Hughes struggled at first-class level, scoring 7 runs in the four innings' in which he batted, with a top score of 4.
