= Tom Brown's Schooldays (film) =

The Thomas Hughes novel Tom Brown's School Days has inspired several film and television adaptations:

- Tom Brown's Schooldays (1916 film)
- Tom Brown's School Days (1940 film)
- Tom Brown's Schooldays (1951 film)
- Tom Brown's Schooldays (1971 TV miniseries)
- Tom Brown's Schooldays (2005 TV film)
