= Edward Titley =

English cricketer and Royal Air Force officer

Personal information
- Full name: Edward George Titley
- Born: 7 August 1911; Carlton, Nottinghamshire, England
- Died: 17 July 1943 (aged 31); Moira, Northern Ireland
- Batting: Right-handed
- Role: Wicket-keeper

Domestic team information
- Years: Team
- 1932: Cambridge University

Career statistics
| Competition | First-class |
|---|---|
| Matches | 2 |
| Runs scored | 4 |
| Batting average | 1.00 |
| 100s/50s | –/– |
| Top score | 3 |
| Catches/stumpings | 2/– |
- Source: Cricinfo, 8 September 2020

Edward George Titley (7 August 1911 – 17 July 1943) was an English first-class cricketer and Royal Air Force Volunteer Reserve officer. After attending the University of Cambridge, where he played first-class cricket, Titley became an underwriter in the City of London. He later served in the Second World War, during which he was killed in a plane crash in 1943.

== Life and military service ==
Titley was born at Carlton, Nottinghamshire in August 1911. He was educated at Uppingham School before going to Pembroke College, Cambridge. While studying at Cambridge, he made two appearances in first-class cricket for Cambridge University against Sussex and the touring Indians at Fenner's in 1932. He also captained Cambridge at Eton Fives. After graduating from Cambridge, he went to work in the City of London in 1934 as an underwriter for Lloyd's.

In November 1938, he joined the Royal Air Force Volunteer Reserve as a pilot officer. He was called up on 1 September 1939, two days before the British declaration of war on Nazi Germany. He completed his training in October 1940, joining up with 609 Squadron and gaining promotion to flying officer in September 1941. While flying with the squadron, he became ill, blacking out and nearly colliding with another plane, but managed to land his aircraft successfully. Upon examination, it was determined that he had a problem with his inner ear and was deemed unfit for further high-altitude flying. As a result, he was transferred to No. 5 Operational Training Unit. He was granted the temporary rank of squadron leader in September 1942. Titley was killed near Moira in Northern Ireland on 17 July 1943, when the Bristol Beaufort he was flying crashed. He was buried at Northam, Devon where in 1934 he had married Dorothy Whipp.
