= Titley Pool =

Kettle lake in Herefordshire, England

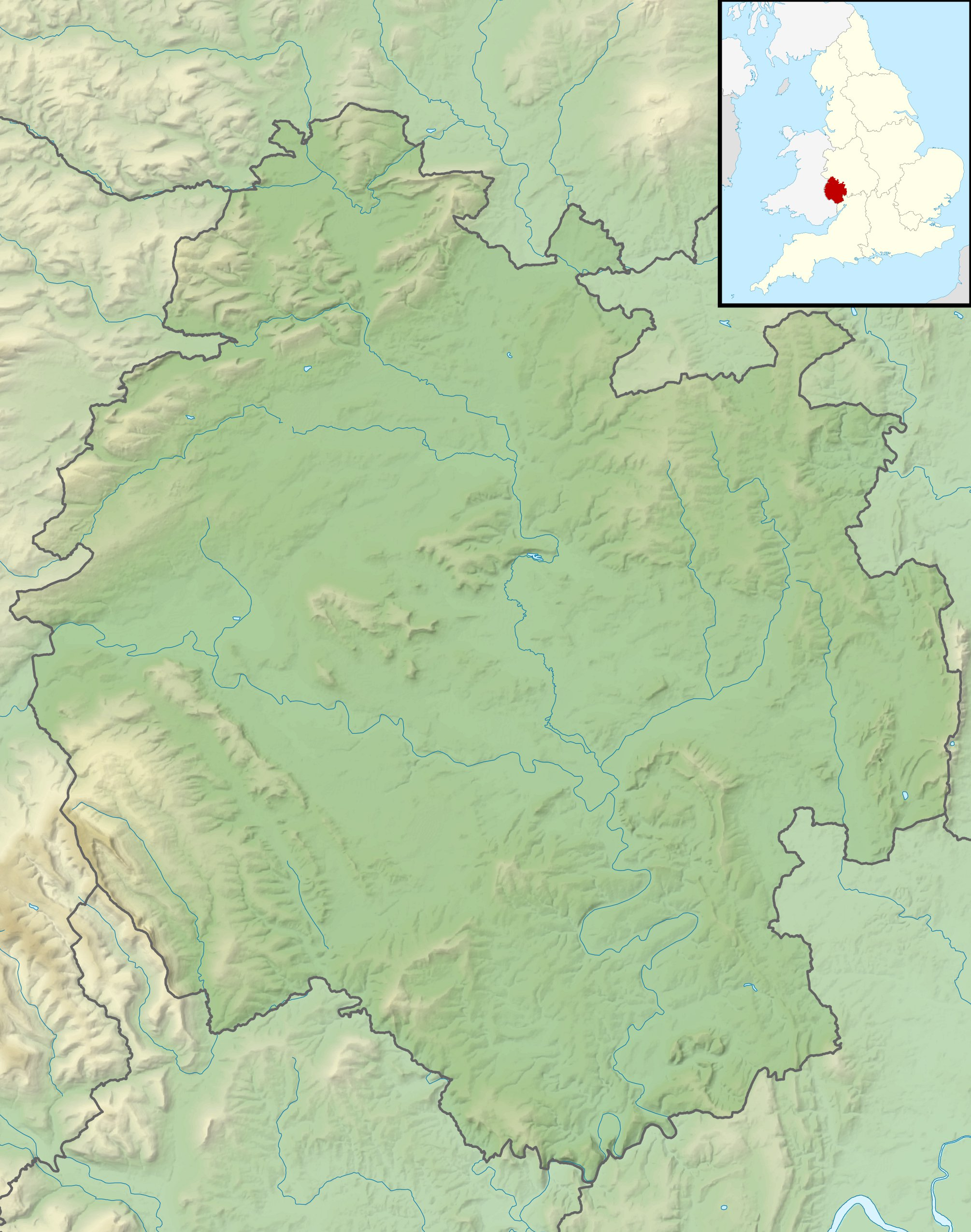
- Location within Herefordshire
- Coordinates: 52.229679°N 2.989488°W
- Type: kettle lake, reservoir
- Primary inflows: Rainfall, surface runoff
- Primary outflows: Small stream to River Arrow
- Catchment area: 68 hectares (170 acres)
- Built: 18th century (enlarged)
- Max. length: 370 metres (1,210 ft)
- Max. width: 135 metres (443 ft)
- Surface area: 5.7 ha (14 acres)
- Average depth: 0.7 metres (2.3 ft)
- Water volume: 40,000 m^{3} (8.8 million imperial gallons; 32 acre-feet)
- Shore length^{1}: 1 kilometre (0.62 mi)
- ^{1} Shore length is not a well-defined measure.

Titley Pool is a lake in Herefordshire, England. It is situated at Titley, 3 kilometres (1.9 mi) north west of the town of Kington. It is a naturally formed kettle lake which was enlarged into a reservoir by the construction of an earth embankment dam at its eastern end during the 18th century as part of the landscaping of the grounds of Eywood House Estate.

The lake is one of the largest bodies of open water in the county of Herefordshire and an important wetland ornithological site.
