= Clarendon Commission =

1861 investigation of English public schools

The Clarendon Commission was a royal commission established in 1861 to investigate the state of nine leading schools in England, in the wake of complaints about the finances, buildings, and management of Eton College. It was chaired by George Villiers, 4th Earl of Clarendon. The commission sat until 1864, when its report was published with general recommendations on questions of curriculum and governance. The Clarendon Report gives a detailed picture of life in the nine schools. As a consequence of its publication, the Public Schools Act was passed in 1868.

== Scope ==
The commission's terms of reference were: "To inquire into the nature and application of the Endowments, Funds and Revenue belonging to or received by the hereinafter mentioned Colleges, Schools and Foundations; and also to inquire into the administration and management of the said Colleges, Schools and Foundations". The nine schools comprised seven boarding schools (Eton, Charterhouse, Harrow, Rugby, Shrewsbury, Westminster, and Winchester) and two day schools (St Paul's and Merchant Taylors'). The 1868 act concerned itself only with the seven boarding schools.

In the concluding paragraphs of the report, high praise was given to the nine schools:

It is not easy to estimate the degree in which the English people are indebted to these schools for the qualities on which they pique themselves most – for their capacity to govern others and control themselves, their aptitude for combining freedom with order, their public spirit, their vigour and manliness of character, their strong but not slavish respect for public opinion, their love of healthy sports and exercise. These schools have been the chief nurseries of our statesmen; in them, and in schools modelled after them, men of all the various classes that make up English society, destined for every profession and career, have been brought up on a footing of social equality....

== See also ==
- George Villiers, 4th Earl of Clarendon
