= Public Schools Act 1868 =

Act of the Parliament of the United Kingdom

Public Schools Act 1868 (Note: Section 1.)
- Act of Parliament
- Parliament of the United Kingdom
- Long title: An Act to make further Provision for the good Government and Extension of certain Public Schools in England.
- Citation: 31 & 32 Vict. c. 118
- Territorial extent: United Kingdom

Dates
- Royal assent: 31 July 1868
- Commencement: 31 July 1868 (Note: The Acts of Parliament (Commencement) Act 1793.)
Other legislation
Amended by	Public Schools Act 1869; Public Schools Act 1871; Public Schools (Shrewsbury and Harrow Schools Property) Act 1873; Public Schools (Eton College Property) Act 1873; Statute Law (Repeals) Act 1973; Statute Law (Repeals) Act 1998; Statute Law (Repeals) Act 2004; Constitutional Reform Act 2005
Relates to	Endowed Schools Act 1869

Status: Amended

Text of statute as originally enacted

The Public Schools Act 1868 (31 & 32 Vict. c. 118) is an act of the Parliament of the United Kingdom to reform and regulate seven leading English boys' boarding schools, most of which had grown out of ancient charity schools for the education of a certain number of poor scholars, but were by then, as they are today, also educating many sons of the English upper and upper-middle classes on a fee-paying basis. The preamble describes "An Act to make further Provision for the good Government and Extension of certain Public Schools in England."

The act followed the report of the Clarendon Commission, a Royal Commission set up to inquire into nine leading schools, which sat from 1861 to 1864 and investigated conditions and abuses which had grown up over the centuries at these originally charity schools.

The bill was presented for its first reading in the Lords by Lord Clarendon on 13 March 1865 and for its second reading on 3 April 1865. The bill was in two parts, the first containing the general provisions of the bill and the second containing specific proposals for each school.

St Paul's School and Merchant Taylors' School were omitted, as they argued successfully that their constitutions made them legally "private" schools and that their constitutions could not be altered by public legislation; thus the act concerned itself with the other seven schools investigated by the Clarendon Commission:

- Charterhouse School
- Eton College
- Harrow School
- Rugby School
- Shrewsbury School
- Westminster School
- Winchester College

The act regulated these seven schools in a number of ways, as recommended by the Clarendon Commission, with the aim of creating better conditions in them and preventing abuses, and authorized the establishment of a board of governors for each school, to supervise their administration. It also freed them of their obligations under their founding charters to educate "Foundation Scholars", i.e. scholarship boys paying nominal or no fees. The Act made it clear that Parliament had authority to legislate for the schools.

In 1887 the Divisional Court and the Court of Appeal determined that the City of London School was a public school.

== Subsequent developments ==
The following enactments were repealed by section 1(1) of, and part XI of schedule 1 to, the Statute Law (Repeals) Act 1973, which came into force on 18 July 1973.

- In section 5, the words from the beginning to " Special Commissioners herein-after mentioned ".
- Section 6.
- In section 8(2), the words from " two months " onwards.
- In section 8(3), the words from " two months " to " Special Commissioners ".
- In section 9, the words from " be submitted " to " approved by them, ". In section 10, the words " of the Special Commissioners and " and the words from " so that such statutes " onwards.
- In section 11, the words from " after the expiration " to " Special Commissioners ", where first occurring, and the words from " with the exception " to " Special Commissioners ", where last occurring.
- Sections 14, 22 and 24.
- In section 26, the words from " Provided firstly " onwards. In section 32, the words from " Provided firstly " onwards.

== Bibliography ==
- Colin Shrosbree (1988). Public Schools and Private Education: the Clarendon Commission, 1861–64, and the Public Schools Acts. Manchester: Manchester University Press. ISBN 978-0-7190-2580-8.
