= Uppingham School =

Public school in Uppingham, Rutland, England

Coordinates: 52°35′16″N 0°43′30″W

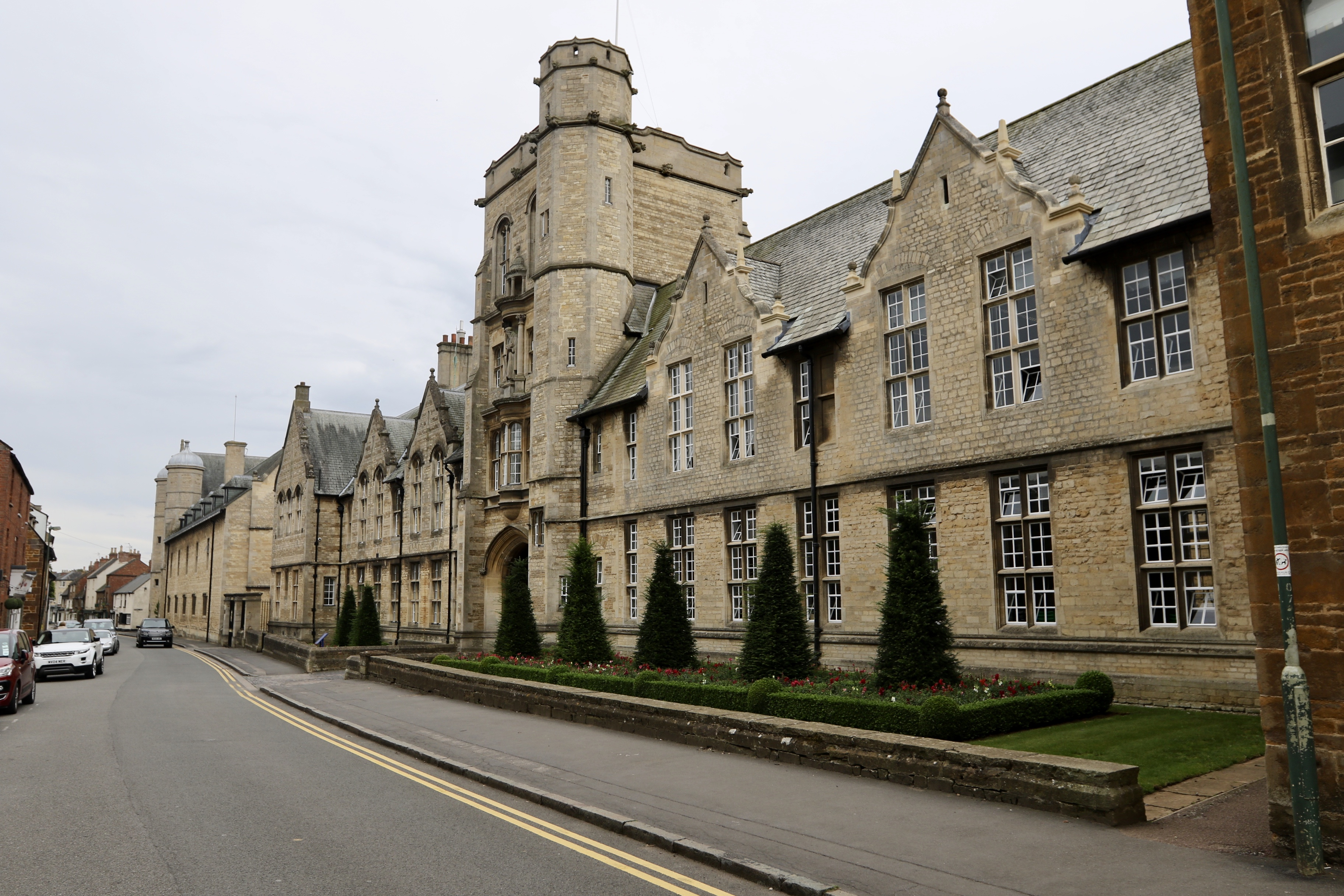
- High Street West, Uppingham; Rutland, LE15 9QE; England

Information
- Type: Public school Private boarding and day school
- Religious affiliation: Church of England
- Established: 1584; 442 years ago
- Founder: Archdeacon Robert Johnson
- Department for Education URN: 120320 Tables
- Headmaster: Richard J. Maloney
- Gender: Coeducational
- Age: 11 to 18
- Enrolment: c. 849 pupils and students
- Student to teacher ratio: 7:1
- Campus size: 120-acre (49 ha) (non-contiguous)
- Campus type: Semi-rural
- Houses: 16 (9 boys', 6 girls',1 day)
- Colours: Dark blue, stone and coral
- Budget: £42,969,003 (2024)
- Revenue: £42,952,918 (2024)
- Alumni: Old Uppinghamians
- School Seal: Latin: Sig Com Gubern Scholar et Hospiciorum in Okeham et Uppingham in Com Rutl; Common seal of the governors of the schools and hospitals of Oakham and Uppingham in the county of Rutland
- Website: uppingham.co.uk

Uppingham School is an independent boarding and day school for boys and girls aged 11 to 18 in Uppingham, Rutland, England. It was founded in 1584 by Robert Johnson, the Archdeacon of Leicester, who also founded Oakham School.

It belongs to the Rugby Group of British independent schools, and its headmaster, Richard Maloney, belongs to the Headmasters' and Headmistresses' Conference.

Edward Thring, who was headmaster between 1853 and 1887, was the school's best known headmaster, and his curriculum changes were adopted by other English public schools. John Wolfenden, who was headmaster between 1934 and 1944, chaired the Wolfenden Committee, whose report recommending the decriminalisation of homosexuality appeared in 1957.

Uppingham has a musical tradition that is informed by the work of Paul David and Robert Sterndale Bennett, and has the biggest playing-field area of any school in England that consists of three separate areas of the town: Leicester to the west, Middle to the south, and Upper to the east.

== History ==
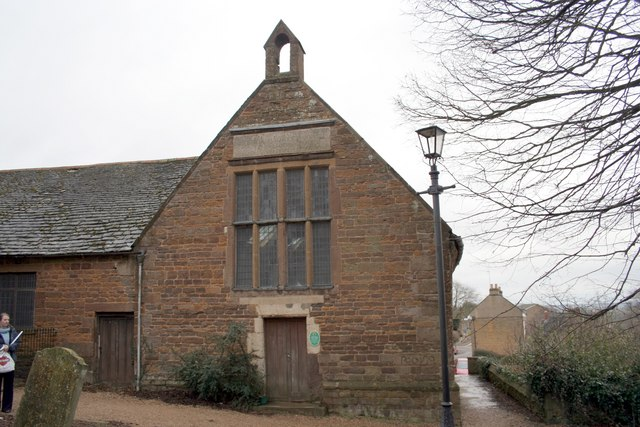
Old School

In 1584 Uppingham School was founded with a hospital, or almshouse, by Archdeacon Robert Johnson. The original 1584 schoolroom in Uppingham churchyard is still owned by the school and is a Grade I listed building. The original hospital building is now incorporated in the School Library.

The first recorded Uppingham schoolboy was Henry Ferne from York, who was chaplain to Charles I. Another prominent early schoolboy was the Jesuit Anthony Turner, one of the martyrs of the Popish Plot.

In the 17th, 18th and early 19th centuries Uppingham remained a small school of 30–60 pupils, with two staff. Despite its small size, pupils then regularly gained places and scholarships to Oxford and Cambridge universities. During that period, various lasting features of life in the school developed. It became a full boarding school, with all pupils having individual studies. This pattern was set around 1800 and some of the original studies survive, although no longer used as such. The first recorded school play was performed in 1794 and Uppingham has a thriving theatre. The main recreation in the 19th century was cricket – the first recorded cricket match, described in the school magazine, was in 1815 – and the game still thrives there. In 1846 the institution of school praepostors, or prefects, was established. The praepostors are called "pollies" around the school. One of the earliest Old Boys to gain fame was Thomas Bonney, a pupil in the 1850s, who became the most distinguished geologist of his time, and president of the Alpine Club. Until at least 1853, the school was known as "Uppingham Grammar School."

Edward Thring transformed the school from a small, local grammar school into a large, well-known public school, with 330 pupils. During his headship on 4 April 1876 the entire school, consisting of 300 boys, thirty masters, and their families, moved temporarily to Borth in Wales after an outbreak of typhoid ravaged the town as a result of the poorly maintained water system. In Borth the school took over the disused Cambrian Hotel and a number of boarding houses, remaining there for fourteen months. The move was successful in saving the school from a serious epidemic and the move to Borth is commemorated in an annual service held in the school chapel.

Thring also won national and transatlantic reputation as an original thinker and writer on education. At a time when mathematics and classics dominated the curriculum, he encouraged many ‘extra' subjects: French, German, science, history, art, carpentry, and music. In particular, Thring was a pioneer in his introduction of music into the regular system of education. He opened the first gymnasium in an English school, the forerunner of the present sports hall, and later added a heated indoor swimming pool. He commissioned a number of buildings, notably the chapel designed by the Gothic Revival architect G. E. Street.

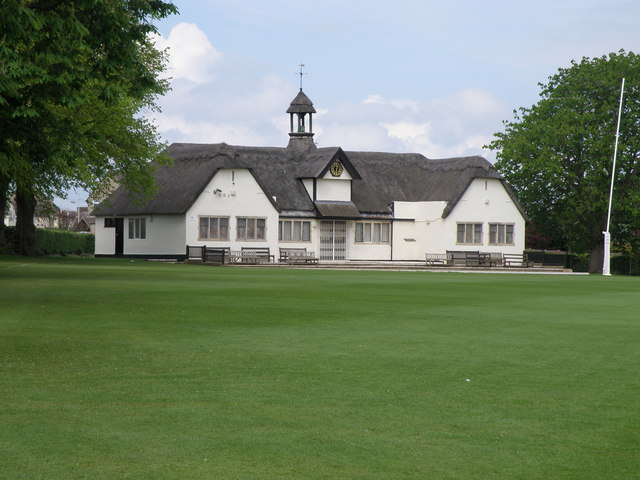
School cricket pavilion by Walter Tapper, built as a war memorial in 1923

During this period the school continued to grow, with numbers reaching well over 400. These years saw the formation in 1889 of the Combined Cadet Force; the creation in 1890 of the first school orchestra; in 1896 the re-introduction of hockey; and the adoption of rugby football, with the first match being against Rugby. Uppingham pupils still take part in all these activities today.

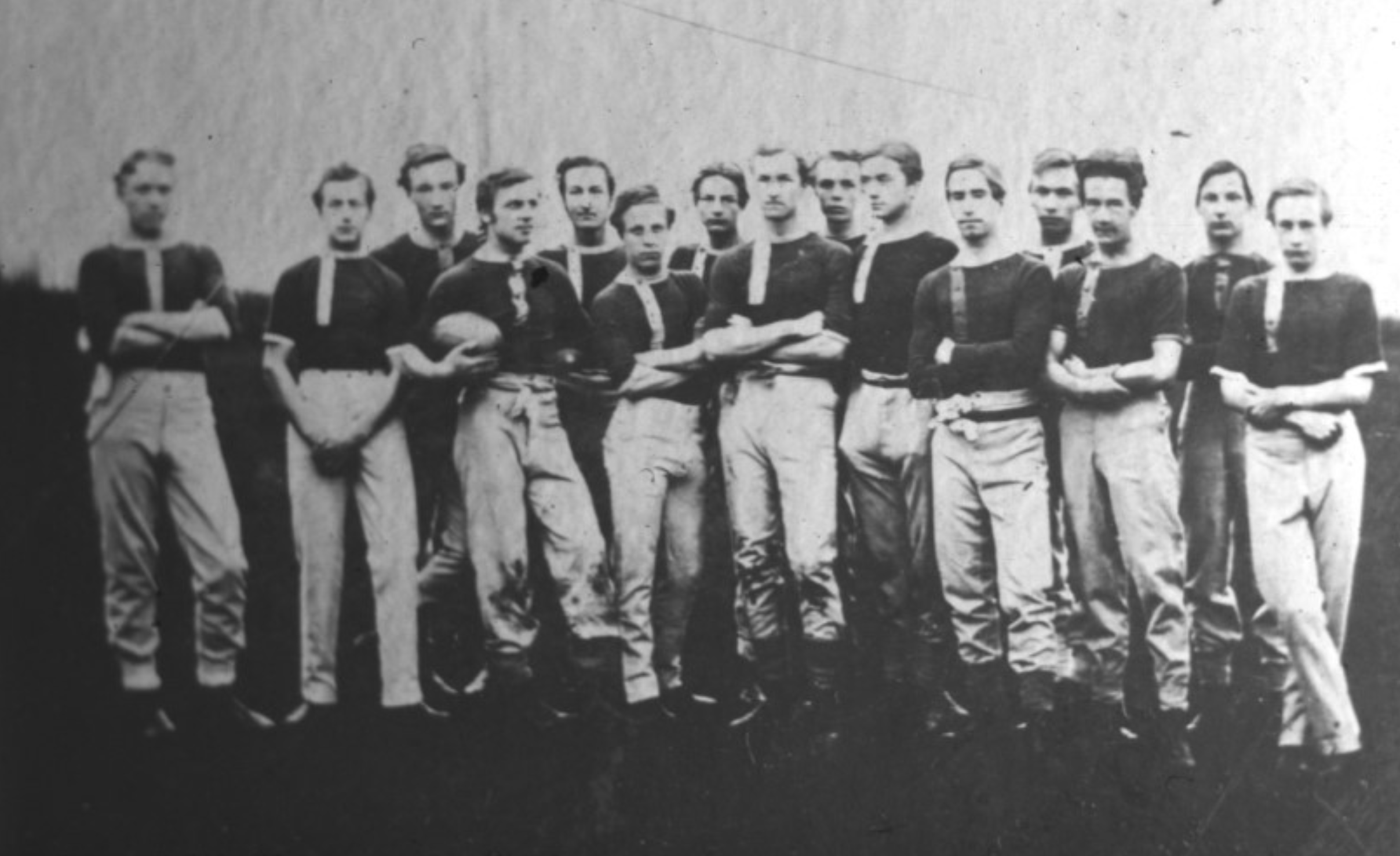
Uppingham School rugby football team, 1862

The buildings of the school continued to grow with the construction of the tower block, through which one still enters the school, and the combined gymnasium and concert hall, which in 1972 was converted into the school theatre.

Throughout the Second World War the buildings of Kingswood School in Bath were used by the Admiralty for strategic planning. During that time Kingswood School lodged with Uppingham School sharing Uppingham's resources.

The growth of the school continued with numbers of over 600 pupils being reached in the 1960s. In 1973 the first girl attended Uppingham, as a day-girl; with a few more added in 1974. Then in 1975 the first sixth form girls' house, Fairfield, was opened, with its full complement of 50 girls achieved by 1976. This venture proved so successful that in 1986 a second girls' house, Johnson's, was opened; and in 1994 the Lodge House (formerly a boys' house) was converted into the third girls' house. In 2001 the first 13-year-old girls entered the school, with the opening of a new house, Samworths', the first house for girls aged 13–18; followed in 2002 by the conversion of Fairfield into a second house for 13–18-year-old girls and another new house, New House, opened in 2004. Johnson's was converted to a 13–18 girls' house in 2011 with an extension and significant internal reconstruction.

The buildings of the school continued to expand. The First World War took the lives of 450 former pupils and the school hall was built in their memory. Also built in this period were the main classroom block in the centre of the school, the cricket and rugby pavilions, and a school sanatorium. In 1956 a new science block was opened by the Prince Philip, Duke of Edinburgh; it was extended in the 1960s. In 1989 a new maths block for mathematics and computing was opened by Stephen Hawking. New squash courts were built and in 1970 the sports centre, incorporating the old swimming pool, was opened, with the later addition of a climbing wall and a weights room. In 1981 came a new music school. In 1995 a new arts and design faculty was built, the Leonardo Centre, designed by an old pupil, Piers Gough. In 2003 a language centre (TLC) opened to house all the modern-language classrooms. In 2006 a third music facility, the Paul David Music School (PDMS), opened in School Lane, incorporating the old houses that were there, to accommodate the growing demand for music at the school. In 2010 the Uppingham School Sports Centre (USSC) was completed, and the old sports centre demolished to create space to develop the new science centre, all part of the new "Western Quad".

In the post-war period, sports other than the main ones of rugby, hockey, cricket, athletics, swimming and shooting began to be introduced including tennis, basketball, badminton, fencing, squash, sailing, soccer and golf.

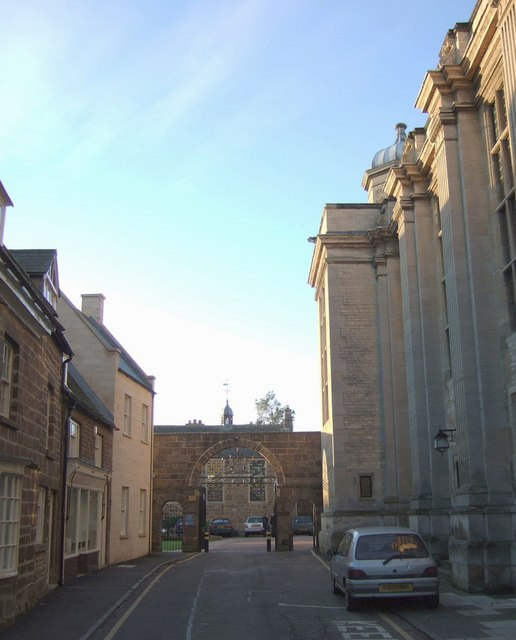
School Lane; on the right is the Memorial Hall, built in the 1920s. The buildings on the left are now part of the school's Music Centre. The building beyond the arch is the library, originally the hospital

In 1945 Douglas Guest succeeded Robert Sterndale Bennett as Director of Music and this area of school life developed further. The concert choir was expanded to involve over half the school: a bandmaster was appointed; music scholarships were introduced; and various music societies were created. All these innovations remain. The school houses two large three-manual pipe organs, in the memorial hall and the chapel, the latter one being rebuilt in the summer of 2007 by Nicholson Organs of Malvern. A new choir division appears high on the south wall, and a new console and action have been installed, along with new pipework. The organ is notable for a smooth Harrison tone and a rare pair of independent sets of Swell shutters – one opening west into the nave extension and one south across the repositioned choir stalls.

Uppingham has one of the largest private theatres in the country, in a building based on the original Leipzig Gewandhaus. An extension to the main theatre houses a drama studio to be used for the teaching of theatre studies as well as for performances of smaller productions. There is also a workshop to provide storage and workspace for technical equipment. The 300-seat proscenium arch theatre has featured a range of productions, recently including Chicago and Treasure Island. The Secondary School edition of Harry Potter and The Cursed Child will be performed there by the school in winter 2026, followed by Sweeney Todd in spring 2027.

=== Recent developments ===
In 2005 the school was one of fifty of the country's leading independent schools which were fined for exchanging information on planned fee increases, exposed by The Times. Each school was required to pay a nominal penalty of £10,000 and all agreed to make ex-gratia payments totalling three million pounds into a trust designed to benefit pupils who attended the schools during the period in respect of which fee information was shared. However, Jean Scott, the head of the Independent Schools Council, said that independent schools had always been exempt from anti-cartel rules applied to business, were following a long-established procedure in sharing the information with each other, and that they were unaware of the change to the law (on which they had not been consulted). She wrote to John Vickers, the OFT director-general, saying, "They are not a group of businessmen meeting behind closed doors to fix the price of their products to the disadvantage of the consumer. They are schools that have quite openly continued to follow a long-established practice because they were unaware that the law had changed."

In May 2010, a pupil rebellion was staged over the expulsion of several sixth-form pupils. For a day, 500 pupils failed to attend classes and formed protests in aid of the dismissed pupils.

In March 2011, twice Olympic gold medallist Sebastian Coe officially opened the school's new sports centre. The building includes a large sports hall, 25m swimming pool, a 50-station fitness studio, squash courts, gymnasium and two dance studios. It was designed by ORMS Architecture Design and is part of the school's plans to develop the western campus buildings. The school now has, in a converted squash court behind the theatre, a climbing wall facility, installed in 2010.

In November 2014, Sir Alec Jeffreys officially opened the school's new science centre which, along with an extension to the Leonardo Centre, completed the new 'Western Quad'.

In 2018, the cricket pavilion was listed as Grade II by Historic England.

In 2024, the school opened its first dedicated house for day pupils, named Li Kwok Po House after Old Uppinghamian and Hong Kong banker and politician, Sir David Li Kwok Po.

In 2025, the school expanded to take children aged 11 and 12 into Year 7 and Year 8. These years form the Lower School, and they are based in the school's historic Lorne House.

From 2025, Farleigh became a dedicated sixth form house for boys entering the school at age 16.

Internationally, Uppingham has schools in Egypt and Vietnam. Uppingham Cairo was the first to open in 2024, followed by a second campus in 2026. The first Vietnam campus, Uppingham Hung Yen, opened in September 2026.

== Academic results ==
In 2019, 45% of pupils scored A*-A for their A-Levels examination, whereas 70% scored A*-A for their GCSEs.

In 2023, 69 percent of students achieved grades 9-7 in their GCSE exams, while 51 percent attained A* or A grades in their A-level exams.

== Houses ==
There are nine boys' boarding houses at Uppingham, informally split into three groups:

- The 'Hill Houses' are Brooklands, Fircroft and Highfield (1863);
- The 'Town Houses' are School House, Lorne House, West Deyne (1859) and West Bank (1866);
- The 'Country Houses' are Meadhurst and Farleigh.

There are six girls' boarding houses: Johnson's, The Lodge (sixth form only), Fairfield, New House, Constables and Samworths'. Samworths' was built in 2001 as the first house for girls aged 13 to 18; it was named after the Samworth Brothers, Old Uppinghamians, who helped to finance the construction.

There is one day house at Uppingham introduced in September 2024. Li Kwok Po House is based in what used to be the Thring Centre and is named after Sir David Li Kwok Po, who was the first Uppinghamian from Hong Kong in 1954.

There is also a Lower School house at Uppingham, introduced in September 2025. The dedicated Lower School is a co-educational house for pupils in Year 7 and Year 8.

== Notable alumni ==
For a list of notable alumni, see List of Old Uppinghamians

== Military ==
Five Old Uppinghamians have won the Victoria Cross:

- In the First World War:
  - Arthur Moore Lascelles
  - George Allen Maling
  - Thomas Harold Broadbent Maufe
  - John Stanhope Collings-Wells
- In the Second World War:
  - Willward Alexander Sandys-Clarke

== Headmasters ==
- 1641–1666: Francis Meres
- 1840–1853: Henry Holden
- 1853–1887: Edward Thring (1821–1887)
- 1887–1907: Edward Carus Selwyn
- 1907–1915: Harry Ward McKenzie, later head of Durham School
- 1916–1934: Reginald Owen (1887–1961), later archbishop of New Zealand
- 1934–1944: John Wolfenden, later Lord Wolfenden
- 1944–1965: Martin Lloyd
- 1965-1975: John Royds
- 1975–1982: Coll Macdonald
- 1982–1991: Nicholas Raymond Bomford
- 1991–2006: Stephen Winkley
- 2006–2016: Richard Harman
- 2016– : Richard Maloney, previously head of Bede's School, Eastbourne

== Notable staff ==
- George Howson (1886–1900), reforming headmaster of Gresham's School
- Hugh Jackman (1987), actor (assistant master, PE teacher)
- Chris Read, former England cricketer
- Nick De Luca, former Scottish rugby player
- Tyrone Howe, former Irish and Lions rugby player
- Walter Greatorex, composer and organist

== Southern Railway Schools Class ==
The 24th steam locomotive (Engine 923) in the Southern Railway's class V (of which there were 40) was originally named Uppingham, but the name was changed after objections from the school.

This class was also known as the Schools Class because all 40 of the class were named after prominent English public schools. 'Uppingham', as it was called, was built in December 1933 and had its name changed to Bradfield on 14 August 1934.

== See also ==
- Maidwell Hall
