= New Radnor railway station =

Former railway station in Powys, Wales

New Radnor
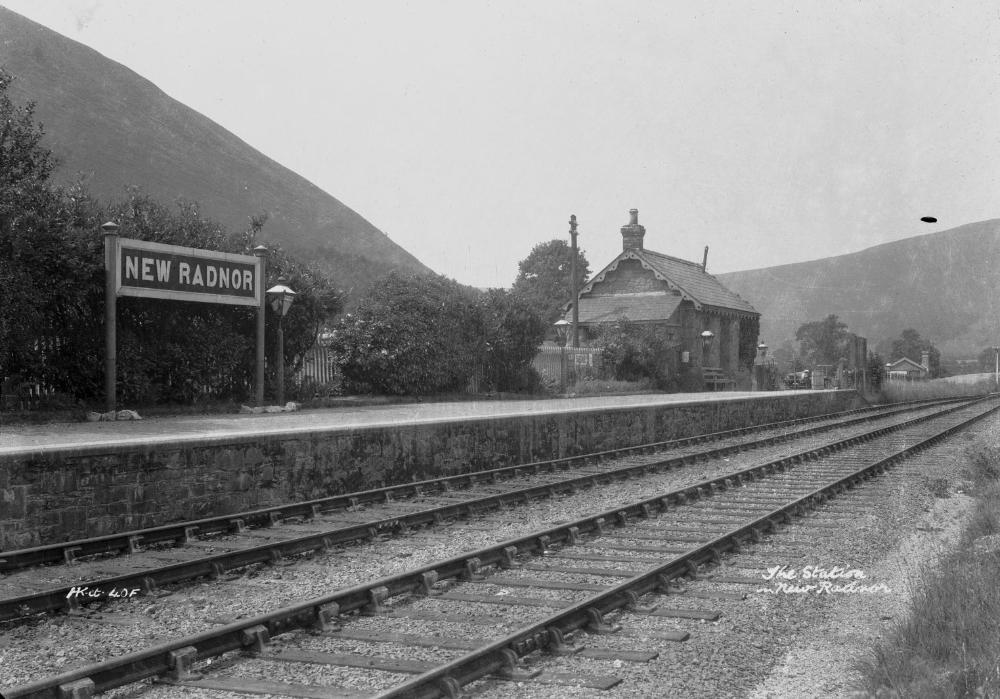

General information
- Location: New Radnor, Powys; Wales
- Coordinates: 52.2365°N 3.1480°W
- Grid reference: SO216604
- Platforms: 1

Other information
- Status: Disused

History
- Original company: Kington and Eardisley Railway
- Pre-grouping: Great Western Railway
- Post-grouping: Great Western Railway

Key dates
- 1875: Opened
- 1951: Closed
Location

New Radnor railway station was a station in New Radnor, Powys, Wales. The terminus station opened in 1875 and closed in 1951.

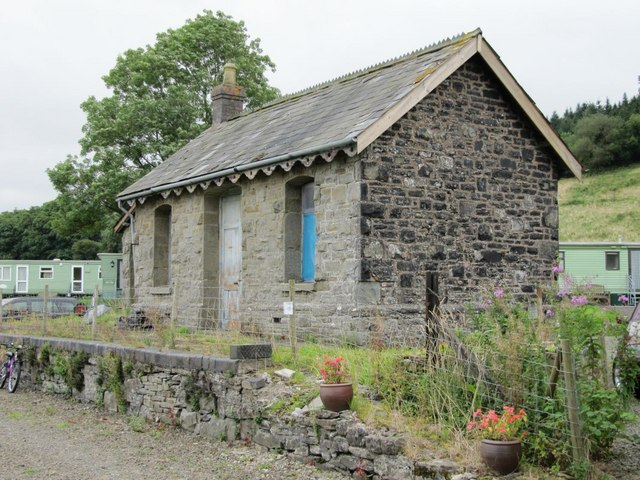
Remains of station buildings in 2009

The Kington and Eardisley Railway developed an extension to the Leominster and Kington Railway from Kington, with ambitions to extend a cross-Wales railway line to Aberystwyth. Developing a small station 1/2 mile (0.80 km) from the town, the plans never came to fruition, only allowing services on the Great Western Railway to both Leominster and onwards to London Paddington. The station closed to passengers in February 1951, and freight in December 1951. Since closure the station building and part of the platform have been restored within a caravan park.

Preceding station	Disused railways	Following station
Terminus	Great Western Railway; Kington and Eardisley Railway	Dolyhir; Line and station closed
