= Kington Tramway =

The Kington Tramway was an early narrow gauge horse-drawn tramway that linked limestone quarries at Burlingjobb near New Radnor in Radnorshire, Wales, to Eardisley in Herefordshire, England, where it joined the Hay Tramway. With a combined length of 36 miles this was the longest plateway that was built in Britain.

== Parliamentary authorisation, construction and opening ==
Kington Railway Act 1818
- Act of Parliament
- Parliament of the United Kingdom
- Long title: An Act for making a Railway from the Hay Railway near Eardisley, in the County of Hereford, to the Lime Works near Burlingjobb, in the County of Radnor.
- Citation: 58 Geo. 3. c. lxiii

Dates
- Royal assent: 23 May 1818

Text of statute as originally enacted

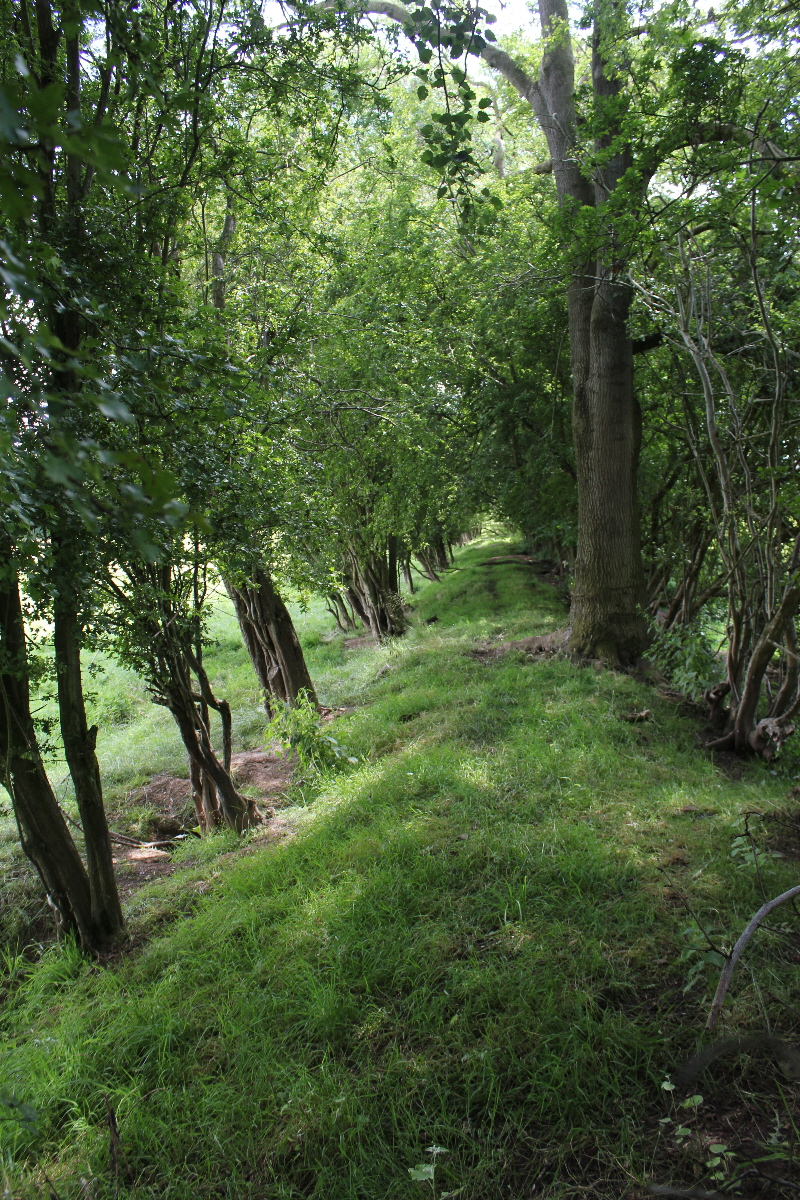
Kington Railway embankment at Eardisley (SO313495)

The tramway received parliamentary authorisation on 23 May 1818 by the Kington Railway Act 1818 (58 Geo. 3. c. lxiii). Construction started immediately and was completed in two sections. The tramway was built to a gauge of 3 ft 6 in (1,067 mm). The tramway adopted the use of cast iron L-shaped tramroad plates in its construction. The vertical portions of the two plates were positioned inside the wheels of the tramway wagons and the plates were spiked to stone blocks for stability. The first section from Eardisley to Kington was opened on 1 May 1820. The western section from Kington to quarries at Burlingjobb, 3 miles (4.8 km) east of New Radnor opened on 7 August 1820.

In 1962 the discovery of a book containing all the minutes of the meetings of the Kington Railway (1818-1862) was made in the Midland Bank in Kington. This book listed the initial shareholders in the business, which included James Watt, who invested £500. His son, James Watt jnr, was a member of the Kington Railway Company's central committee until the end of his life.

== Operation of the tramway ==
For the tramway's opening, an end-on connection was made with the Hay Railway, also a 3 ft 6 in (1,067 mm) plateway. This co-operative arrangement allowed the through working of wagons, pulled by horses, along a continuous 36-mile (58 km) line to wharves on the Brecknock and Abergavenny Canal.

The tramway was intended solely for the carriage of goods and minerals, and therefore did not carry any passengers. Although wagons were horse-drawn there was an account in 1841 of an 'ingenious' man-powered vehicle, which was propelled by means of cogs and hand winch operated by two men seated on the vehicle. They travelled from Hay to Brecon at about 5 to 6 miles per hour, loaded up with a ton of coal and returned the next day. They broke their journey for refreshments at the Hay Gas-House, and children played with the machine and broke one of the wheels. As a result of the damage the men had to push the machine to Eardisley, whereas they had been headed to Kington.

== Merger and subsequent use ==
The Kington Tramway was acquired by the Kington and Eardisley Railway in 1862. The new company used much of the line of the tramway to build its standard-gauge railway, utilising normal rails and steam locomotives, between Eardisley and Kington.
