= Almeley railway station =

Former railway station in Herefordshire, England

Almeley
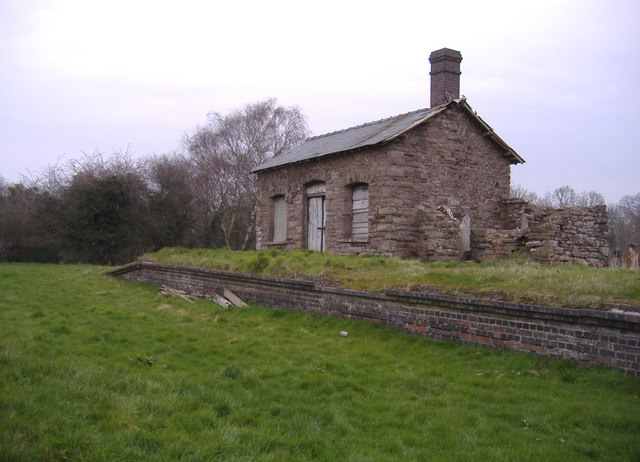
- Almeley station prior to renovation

General information
- Location: Almeley, Herefordshire; England
- Coordinates: 52.1587°N 2.9822°W
- Grid reference: SO329516
- Platforms: 1

Other information
- Status: Disused

History
- Original company: Kington and Eardisley Railway
- Pre-grouping: Great Western Railway
- Post-grouping: Great Western Railway

Key dates
- 1875: Station opened
- 1 January 1917: Station closed
- 11 December 1922: Station reopened
- 1 July 1940: Station closed
Location

Almeley railway station was a railway station on the line from Kington to Eardisley in the English county of Herefordshire.

== History ==
Opened on the Kington and Eardisley Railway, operated from the outset by the Great Western Railway, the station closed during the Second World War.

== The site today ==
The station building, which was used for many years as a cattle shed, has been converted into a private residential property, and featured in a 2024 episode of the BBC television series Escape to the Country. The platform still exists as part of the renovated property.

Preceding station	Historical railways	Following station
Lyonshall; Line and station closed	Great Western Railway; Kington and Eardisley Railway	Eardisley; Line and station closed
