= Marston Halt railway station =

Former railway station in Herefordshire, England

Marston Halt

General information
- Location: Marston, Herefordshire; England
- Coordinates: 52.2192°N 2.9384°W
- Grid reference: SO359583

Other information
- Status: Disused

History
- Original company: Leominster and Kington Railway
- Pre-grouping: Great Western Railway
- Post-grouping: Great Western Railway

Key dates
- November 1862: Opened
- January 1864: closed
- 26 August 1929: reopened
- 7 February 1955: Closed
Location

Marston Halt railway station was a station in Marston, Herefordshire, England. The station was opened in 1862 and closed in 1955. The station was located north east of the village, at the top of Marston Lane.

| Preceding station | Disused railways | Following station |
|---|---|---|
| Titley Junction; Line and station closed | Great Western Railway; Leominster and Kington Railway | Pembridge; Line and station closed |
