= Eardisley railway station =

Former railway station in Herefordshire, England

Eardisley
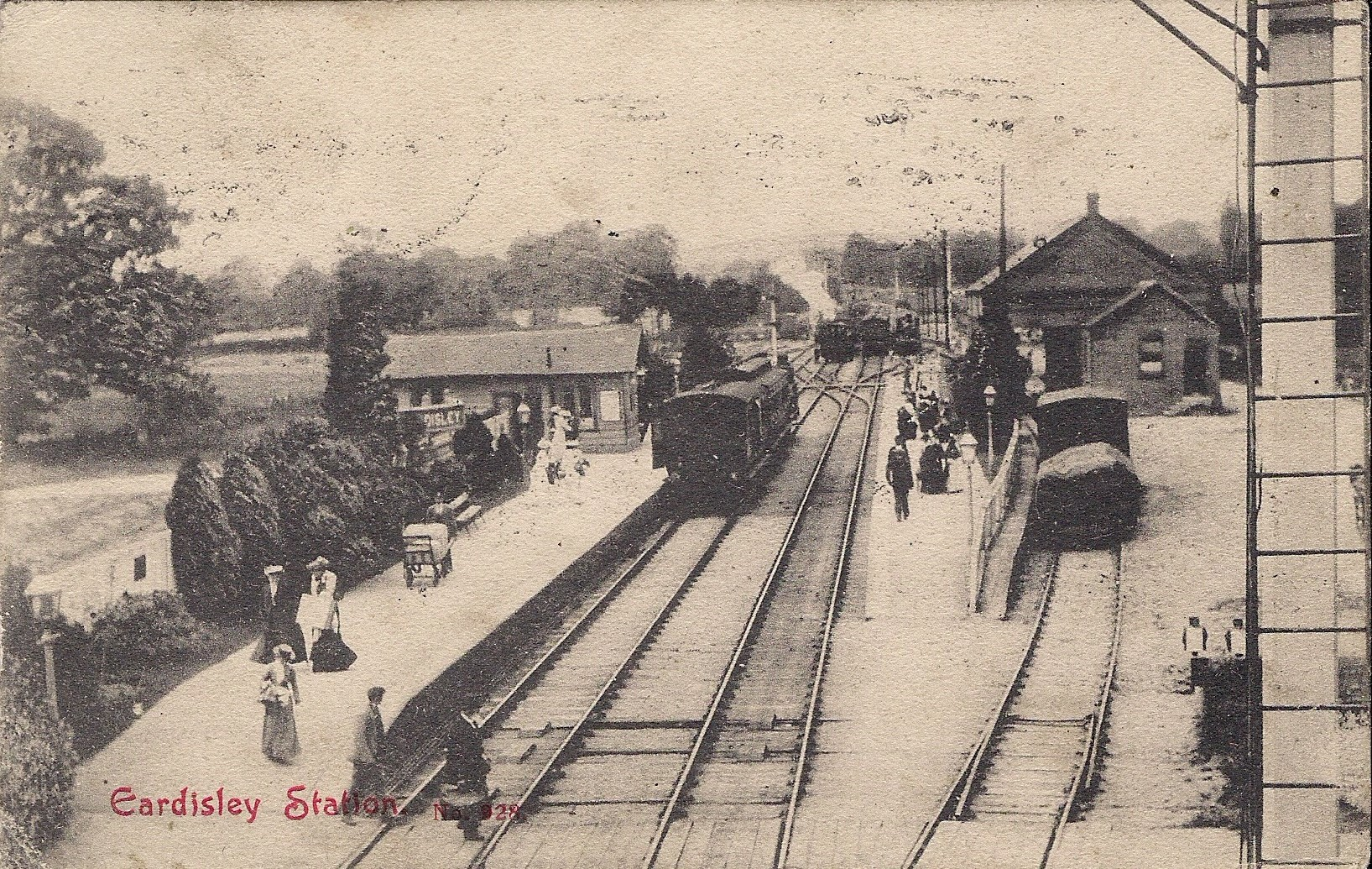
- A postcard view of Eardisley railway station in the early 20th century

General information
- Location: Eardisley, Herefordshire; England
- Coordinates: 52.1308°N 3.0080°W
- Grid reference: SO311485
- Platforms: 2

Other information
- Status: Disused

History
- Original company: Hereford, Hay and Brecon Railway
- Pre-grouping: Midland Railway
- Post-grouping: London, Midland and Scottish Railway

Key dates
- 30 June 1863: Opened
- 31 December 1962: Closed to passengers
- 1964: Closed
Location

Eardisley railway station was a station in Eardisley, Herefordshire, England. The station was opened on 30 June 1863, closed to passengers on 31 December 1962 and closed completely in 1964. The former station site, now an industrial estate, is to the south of the village, on the A4111.

| Preceding station | Historical railways | Following station |
|---|---|---|
| Almeley; Line and station closed | Great Western Railway; Kington and Eardisley Railway | Terminus |
| Whitney-on-Wye; Line and station closed | London, Midland and Scottish Railway; Hereford, Hay and Brecon Railway | Kinnersley; Line and station closed |
