= Presteign railway station =

Former railway station in Radnorshire, Wales

Presteign
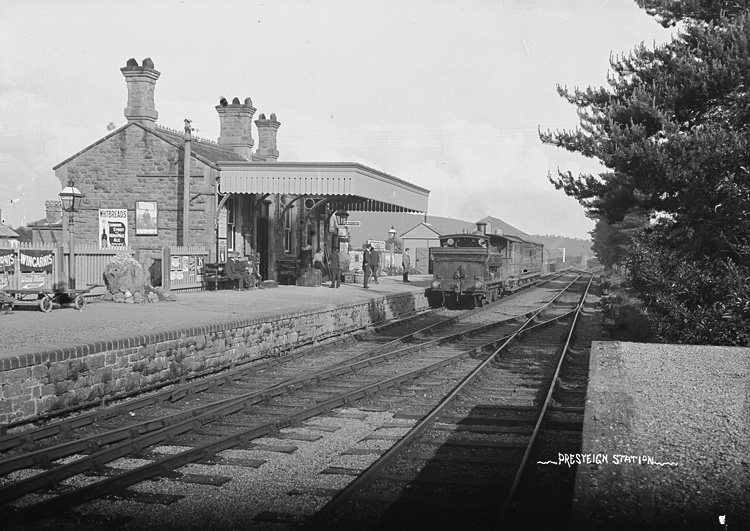
- Historical photograph

General information
- Location: Presteigne, Powys; Wales
- Coordinates: 52.2714°N 3.0066°W
- Grid reference: SO313642

Other information
- Status: Disused

History
- Original company: Leominster and Kington Railway
- Pre-grouping: Great Western Railway
- Post-grouping: Great Western Railway

Key dates
- 1875: Opened
- 1951: passenger service withdrawn
- 1964: Closed
Location

Presteign Railway Station was a railway station serving the town of Presteigne, Radnorshire, Wales. It was a terminus on the Leominster and Kington Railway.

The Kington & Presteigne Railway opened on 9 September 1875. Commencing at Titley Junction, through Staunton on Arrow, in front of the Rodd farm at Roddhurst, via Corton into Presteigne.

By 1929 it was possible to join one of the three steam trains a day – each way – and make the 6 hour journey to London.

The passenger service on this line ended in 1951, but a freight service continued to run every other day until the line was finally closed for good in September 1964.

== History ==
The line, which was to run for a distance of five miles from Titley Junction to Presteigne, was sanctioned by an Act of Parliament in 1871. The first earth was cut by Miss Edith Green-Price in 1872, followed by a luncheon in the Market Hall in Presteigne with the Hon. Arthur Walsh MP presiding.

Three hundred navvies had been enlisted for the work on the line, which involved steep gradients and twenty bridges, plus cuttings, culverts and embankments (and all within five miles!). It has been said by local historian Beryl Lewis that the Stagg at Titley was forced to close due to the riotous behaviour of the navvies.

At Titley Junction there were complex sidings and crossovers and a 60-lever signal box. The worst setback suffered during the work on this line was the collapse of the Forge Crossing Bridge over the River Arrow in 1873, which was caused by heavy floodwater. Despite this the line was completed within four years. The final cost of work was £50,750, almost £10,000 over budget.

When the line was completed Presteigne celebrated, and the town was decorated with banners and the local regiment led decorated wagons through the town. A luncheon was held in a huge marquee behind the Castle Hotel.

By March 1876, six trains were running daily from Kington to Presteigne, each one taking 20 minutes to complete the journey. In 1874 the 1st class fare was 11s 1/2 d, 2nd class was 8s 1/4 d and 3rd class was 5s 3/4d. The 3rd class ticket was governed by the statutory price of 1d per mile set by the Government. The exact length of the line was 5 miles 22 chains, hence the 5 3/4d ticket price. Titley Junction was staffed by a stationmaster and four other men, but more than 20 men were needed at Kington station.

By 1929 the journey from Presteigne to London Paddington took six hours and there were three trains each way on a weekday. In the 1920s a single 1st class fare to London was 34s 11d, and 3rd was 21s 0d. In the 1930s you could travel to London return from Titley Junction for 19s 8d (about 98p). The train left Titley at 7.24am and arrived in London at 11am via Leominster, Bromyard and Worcester. The return train left Paddington at 5.15pm and arrived at Titley by 9.27pm.

By 1939 only three trains were running from Presteigne each day. Following on from the suspension of the passenger service to Presteigne in February 1951 due to national coal shortage, 2 June saw the temporary suspension become permanent, with Forge Crossing Halt closing. A freight service continued to run every other day until the line was finally closed for good in 1964.

The station site has since been demolished. The station site is now occupied by an industrial estate and a section of trackbed repurposed for use as a main road, the B4355/Joe Deakins Road. The rest of the trackbed back towards Titley Junction is mostly privately owned.

Preceding station	Disused railways	Following station
Terminus	Great Western Railway; Leominster and Kington Railway	Forge Crossing Halt; Line and station closed
