= Pembridge =

Village and civil parish in Herefordshire, England

Coordinates: 52.218°N 2.893°W

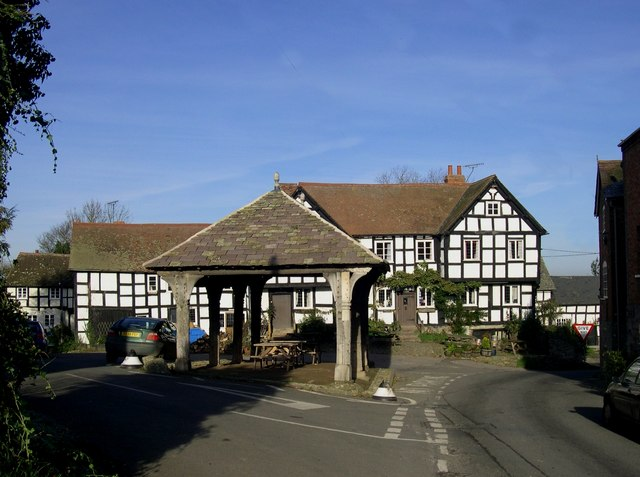
- Market Place, with the open-sided Market Hall in the foreground and the New Inn beyond

- Location within Herefordshire
- Population: 1,056 (2011 Census)
- OS grid reference: SO 391 581
- Civil parish: Pembridge
- Unitary authority: Herefordshire
- Ceremonial county: Herefordshire
- Region: West Midlands
- Country: England
- Sovereign state: United Kingdom
- Post town: Leominster
- Postcode district: HR6
- Dialling code: 01544
- Police: West Mercia
- Fire: Hereford and Worcester
- Ambulance: West Midlands
- UK Parliament: North Herefordshire
- Website: Pembridge Parish Council

Pembridge is a village and civil parish in the Arrow valley in Herefordshire, England. The village is on the A44 road about 6 miles (10 km) east of Kington and 7 miles (11 km) west of Leominster. The civil parish includes the hamlets of Bearwood, Lower Bearwood, Lower Broxwood, Marston, Moorcot and Weston. The 2011 Census recorded the parish population as 1,056.

Pembridge is the major part of the electoral ward of Pembridge and Lyonshall with Titley. The 2011 Census recorded the ward's population as 3,124.

== History ==
The toponym "Pembridge" may be derived from the Welsh Pen-y-Bont, anglicised to its current spelling. A more likely origin of the name Pembridge is that it is derived from the Old English Penebrug(g)e, which probably meant "Pena's bridge".

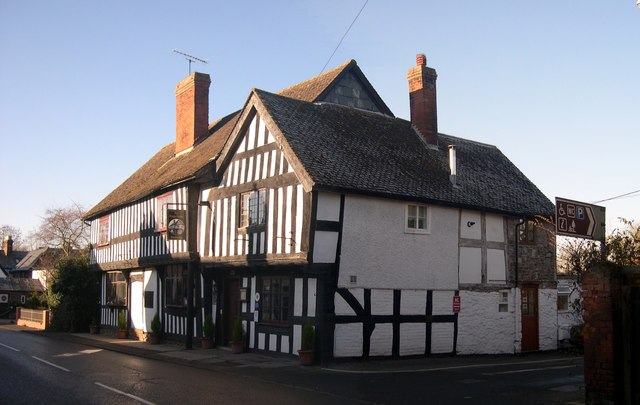
The former Greyhound Inn in East Street, now the King's House restaurant

In 1239, Pembridge was granted a royal charter to hold a market and two fairs: the Cowslip Fair held each May and the Woodcock Fair held each November. In the Middle Ages they were important events for agricultural labourers across the county to seek work from landowners.

The village is noted for its historic timber-framed buildings. It is promoted to visitors as "the heart of the Black and White Village Trail".

In West Street, Swan House and School View are two parts of a single building. It was built in the 14th century a hall house, but had an intermediate floor inserted late in the 16th or early in the 17th century. It was further altered in the 19th and 20th centuries. It is a Grade II* listed building. Also in West Street, Forsythia and West Leigh are two parts of another former hall house. It was built in the 14th or 15th century, and altered in the 17th and 19th centuries. It is a Grade II* listed building.

In the Market Place, the core of the Post Office and Stores is another 14th-century house. It was remodelled in the 17th and late 19th centuries and is a Grade II* listed building. Also in Market Place is the Market Hall. This timber-framed building, which has been dated by dendrochronology to c.1520, is not actually a market hall, but merely a covered market. Eight oak pillars support a roof tiled with stone slates. These pillars are supported on unworked stone bases except for one, which stands on the remains of the medieval cross base. It is a Grade II* listed building.

In East Street is the former post office. It is a 15th-century house altered in the 17th and 19th centuries.

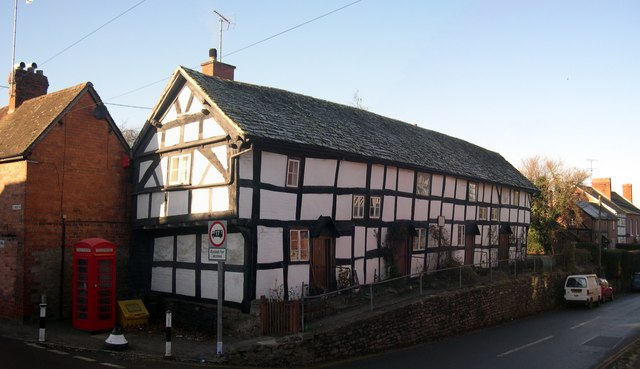
Duppa's Almshouses in Bridge Street, founded in 1661

Pembridge had two sets of almshouses, each divided into six tenements. Duppa's Almshouses in Bridge Street were endowed by Jeffrey Duppa and founded in 1661. They were augmented by his son Brian Duppa, a Royalist who was Bishop of Winchester from 1660 until his death in 1662. Trafford's Almshouses in East Street were endowed by the Rev Dr Thomas Trafford, DD, and built in 1686.

Elsewhere in the parish, Clear Brook is a mainly 17th-century house with a 16th-century rear wing. The Court of Noke is an 18th-century country house, and the most notable brick-built house in the parish.

Gavin Plumley has written about the history of the village in A Home for All Seasons (2022).

=== Former railway ===
Building of the Leominster and Kington Railway linking Leominster and Kington was started in 1855 and completed in 1857. It passed through Pembridge parish, where Pembridge railway station served the village. The Great Western Railway leased the line from the 1860s and absorbed it in 1898. British Railways closed the line to passenger traffic in February 1955 and to freight in late September 1964.

== Landmarks ==
=== Bridge ===
The sandstone bridge over the river Arrow was granted Grade II listed status in June 1987, giving it protection from unauthorised alteration or demolition.

=== Parish church ===
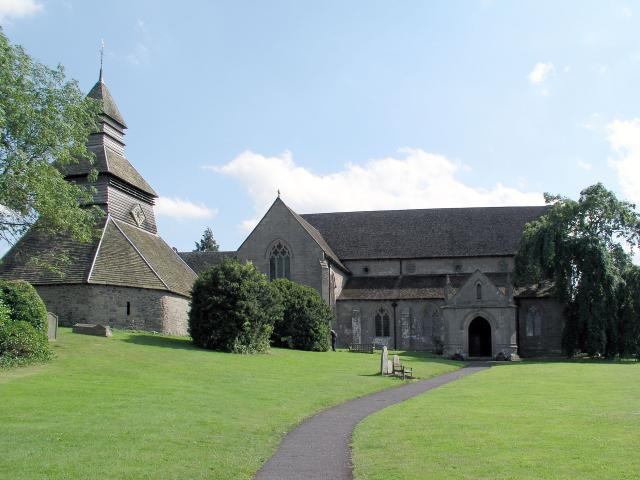
St Mary's parish church and (left) pyramidal belltower

The chancel is the oldest surviving part of St Mary's Church of England parish church, dating from the 13th-century, although a loose Romanesque pillar piscina remains from the Norman church. Blocked arches on both sides of the chancel mark the entrances to former chapels. The splendid font also dates from the 13th century. The major rebuilding of the church in a mature Decorated style has been dated c1320-30. The noble nave arcade is of six bays, with circular ogeed cinquefoiled clerestory windows above. The church has a cruciform plan with 14th-century transepts and a vaulted north porch. There is a rood stair turret entered from the South transept and topped externally with a pinnacle. The West door and the North door date from the 14th century and both retain original ironwork.

The pulpit preacher's desk, lectern and communion rail are Jacobean. A north vestry was added in the 19th century, and the building was restored in 1871 by William Chick and in 1903–09 by Roland W. Paul. The church is a Grade I listed building. On the North side of the chancel a pair of 14th century tomb chests, one with contemporary effigies of a knight and his wife, the other with a civilian and his wife. They date from 1360 to 1380 and depict Nicholas Gour, a Sergeant-at-law with his wife and his son, John Gour and his wife, a steward in the employ of the Mortimer family. There are also several memorial tablets, including three of the 17th century to the Sherborne family, and one to Thomas Trafford (d.1685).

==== Belltower ====
Pembridge is one of several Herefordshire parishes whose belltower stands separate from the church. All but the base of the tower is timber-framed: one of a number of partly or largely timber-framed belltowers in Herefordshire. The tower was built early in the 13th century, rebuilt with the addition of an ambulatory in the 15th or 16th century, and further remodelled in the 17th century when its spire was added. It is a Grade I listed building.

The tower has a ring of five bells. John I Martin of Worcester cast the fourth bell in 1658. Abraham II Rudhall of Gloucester cast the treble bell in 1735. James Barwell of Birmingham cast or recast the first, second and tenor bells in 1898. St Mary's has also a Sanctus bell, which was cast about 1800.

The churchyard contains seven Commonwealth war graves of service personnel, two from World War I and five from World War II.

== Amenities ==
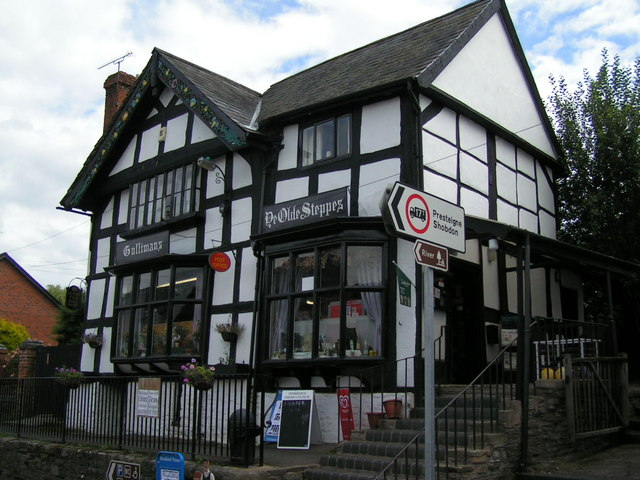
Ye Olde Steppes in East Street

Ye Olde Steppes in East Street is both the village shop and a café and tea room. It is in a 16th-century building that was enlarged in the 17th century and altered in the 19th century.

There is a 17th-century pub, the New Inn, in Market Place. Pembridge had a 16th-century pub, the Greyhound Inn in East Street, but this is now the King's House restaurant. Also in the parish is the Cider Barn bar and restaurant at Hays Head, which opens seasonally.
