= Forge Crossing Halt railway station =

Former railway station in Herefordshire, England

Forge Crossing Halt

General information
- Location: Titley, Herefordshire; England
- Coordinates: 52.2265°N 2.9579°W
- Grid reference: SO346591

Other information
- Status: Disused

History
- Original company: Great Western Railway
- Post-grouping: Great Western Railway

Key dates
- 9 March 1929: Opened
- 1951: Closed
Location

Forge Crossing Halt railway station was a station in Titley, Herefordshire, England. The station, on the Presteigne Branch Line of the Leominster and Kington Railway, was opened in 1929 and closed in 1951.

Preceding station	Disused railways	Following station
Titley Junction; Line and station closed	Great Western Railway; Leominster and Kington Railway	Presteign; Line and station closed
