= Walton, Powys =

Coordinates: 52.2305°N 3.0897°W

Walton
- Location within Powys
- Principal area: Powys
- Preserved county: Powys
- Country: Wales
- Sovereign state: United Kingdom
- Police: Dyfed-Powys
- Fire: Mid and West Wales
- Ambulance: Welsh
- UK Parliament: Brecon, Radnor and Cwm Tawe
- Senedd Cymru – Welsh Parliament: Brecon and Radnorshire

Walton is a village in Powys, Wales, 1,300 yards (1,200 m) west from the border with Herefordshire, England.

The village is 3 miles (5 km) east from New Radnor on the A44 road. A minor road connects to Old Radnor. At 500 yards (460 m) south from Walton is Gore quarry, a Tarmac facility.

Until 1983 Walton was part of the community of Walton and Womaston. It is now part of the community of Old Radnor.
