= Dolyhir railway station =

Former railway station in Powys, Wales

Dolyhir
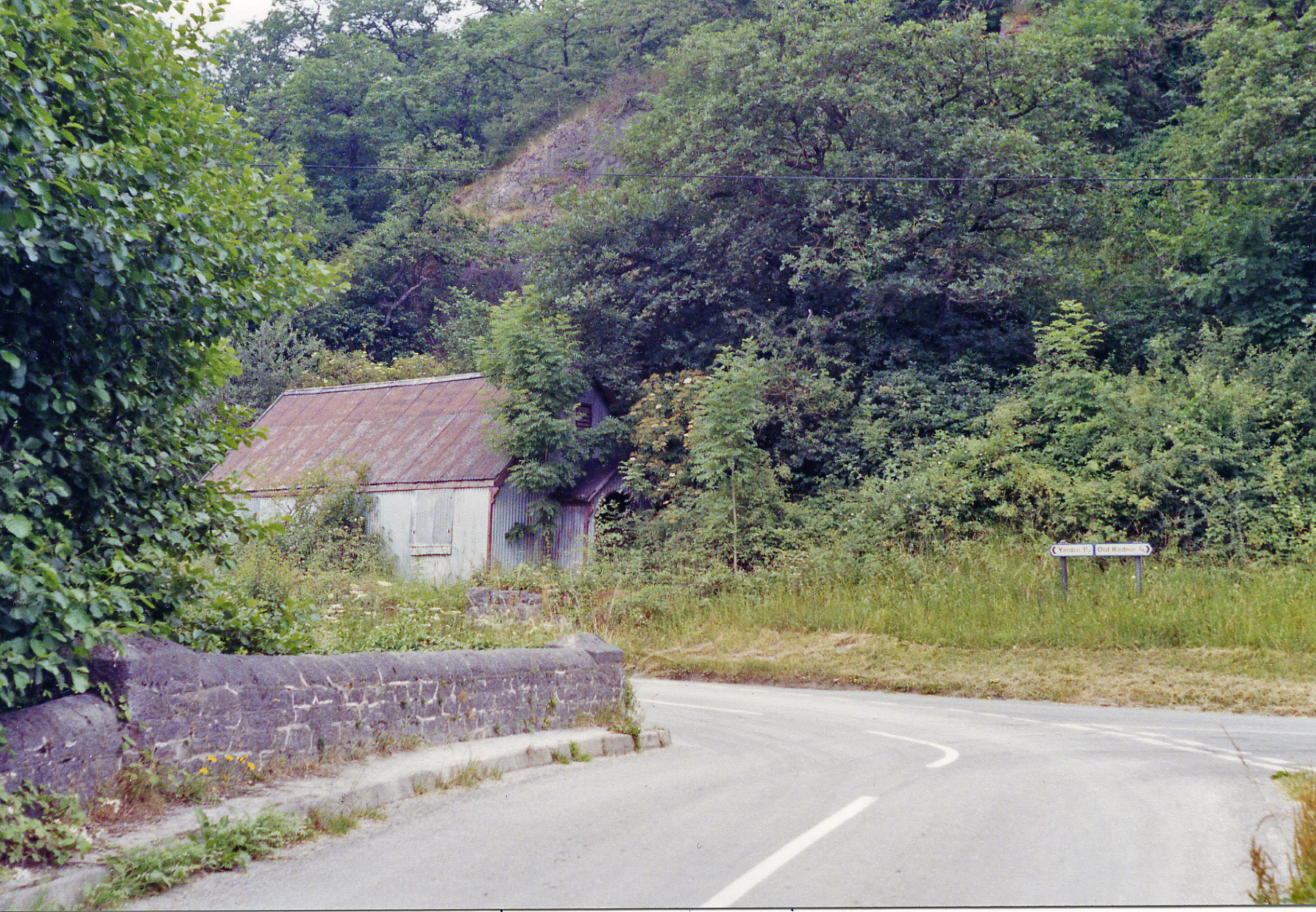
- The site of the station in 1992

General information
- Location: Dolyhir, Powys; Wales
- Coordinates: 52.2164°N 3.1082°W
- Grid reference: SO243581

Other information
- Status: Disused

History
- Original company: Kington and Eardisley Railway
- Pre-grouping: Great Western Railway
- Post-grouping: Great Western Railway

Key dates
- 25 September 1875: Opened
- 5 February 1951: Closed
Location

Dolyhir railway station was a station in Dolyhir, Powys, Wales. The station opened in 1875 and closed in 1951. The station building survives today, and is located in the centre of a quarry. Great Western Railway closure signage is still visible on the building, nearly 70 years after its closure.

Preceding station	Disused railways	Following station
New Radnor; Line and station closed	Great Western Railway; Kington and Eardisley Railway	Stanner; Line and station closed
