= Ox House railway station =

Former railway station in Herefordshire, England

Ox House

General information
- Location: Shobdon, Herefordshire; England
- Coordinates: 52.2439°N 2.8557°W
- Grid reference: SO417609

Other information
- Status: Disused

History
- Original company: Leominster and Kington Railway

Key dates
- 20 August 1857: Opened
- ?: closed
Location

Ox House railway station was a station to the southwest of Shobdon, Herefordshire, England, close to Shobdon Aerodrome.

Ox House was a private station for Shobdon Court, the home of William Bateman-Hanbury, 2nd Baron Bateman who was the first chairman of the Leominster and Kington Railway.

| Preceding station | Disused railways | Following station |
|---|---|---|
| Pembridge; Line and station closed | Leominster and Kington Railway | Kingsland; Line and station closed |
