= Kingsland railway station =

Kingsland railway station may refer to:

- Kingsland railway station, Auckland, a station on the Western Line in Auckland, New Zealand
- Kingsland railway station (England), a former station in Kingsland, Herefordshire, England
