= Lyonshall railway station =

Former railway station in Herefordshire, England

Lyonshall
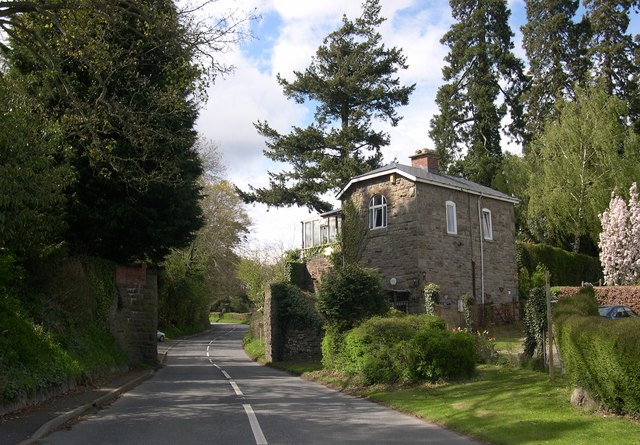
- Lyonshall former station in 2008

General information
- Location: Lyonshall, Herefordshire; England
- Coordinates: 52.1980°N 2.9750°W
- Grid reference: SO334559
- Platforms: 1

Other information
- Status: Disused

History
- Original company: Kington and Eardisley Railway
- Pre-grouping: Great Western Railway
- Post-grouping: Great Western Railway

Key dates
- 3 August 1874: Station opened
- 1 January 1917: Station closed
- 11 December 1922: Station reopened
- 1 July 1940: Station closed
Location

Lyonshall railway station was a station in Lyonshall, Herefordshire, England. The station was opened in 1874 and closed in 1940. It is located on the A480, south east of the village.

Preceding station	Historical railways	Following station
Titley Junction; Line and station closed	Great Western Railway; Kington and Eardisley Railway	Almeley; Line and station closed
