= Old Radnor =

Village in Wales

Old Radnor: Welsh: Pencraig
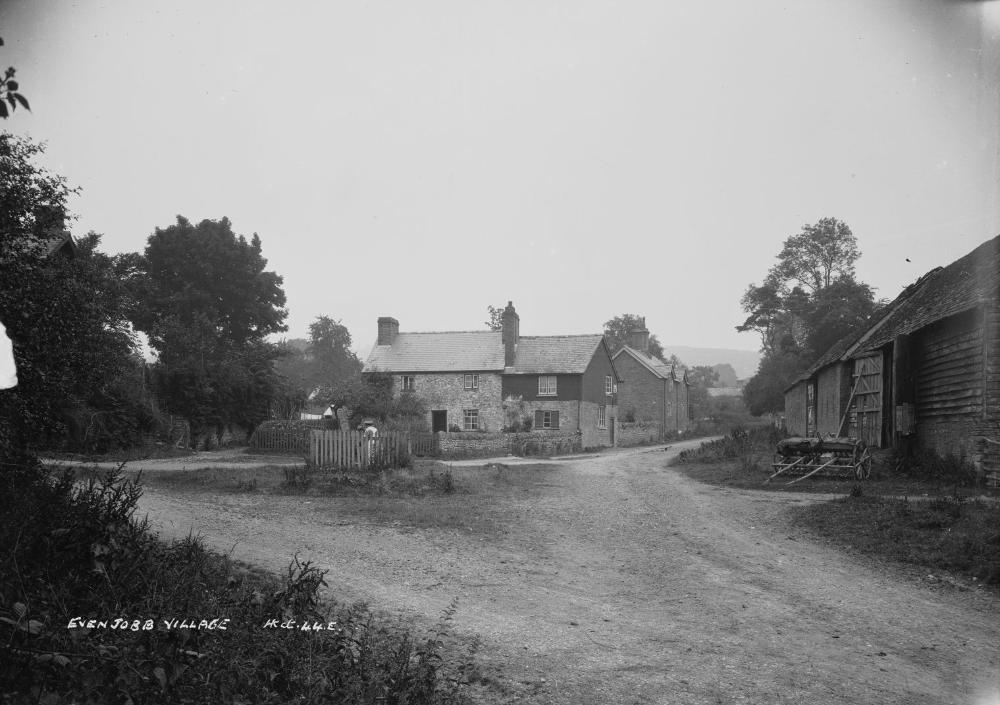

- Location within Powys
- Population: 741 (2011)
- Principal area: Powys
- Preserved county: Powys
- Country: Wales
- Sovereign state: United Kingdom
- Post town: PRESTEIGNE
- Postcode district: LD8
- Dialling code: 01544
- Police: Dyfed-Powys
- Fire: Mid and West Wales
- Ambulance: Welsh
- UK Parliament: Brecon, Radnor and Cwm Tawe
- Senedd Cymru – Welsh Parliament: Brecon & Radnorshire
- List of places UK Wales Powys 52.225°N 3.100°W Community map: Map of the community

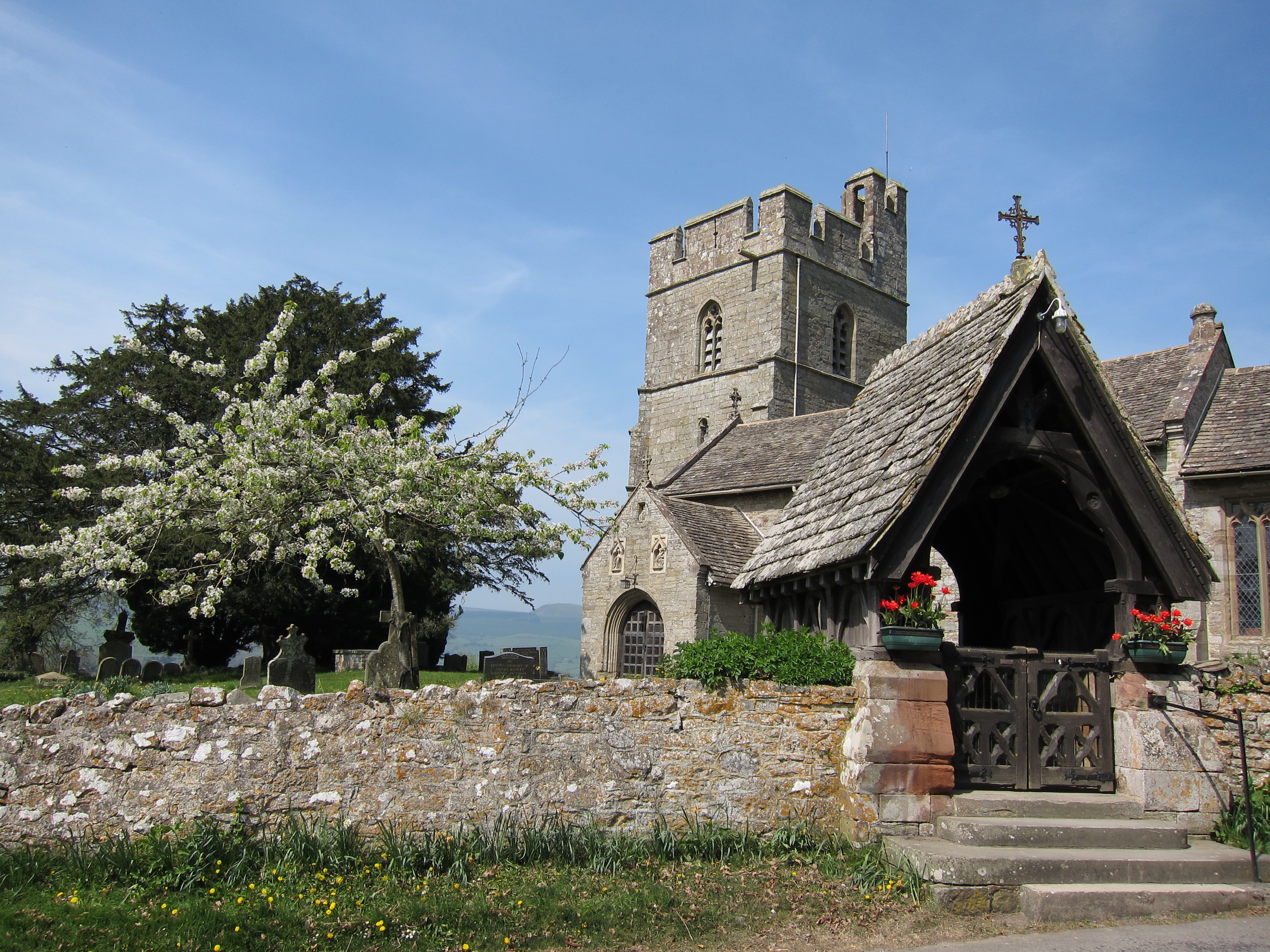
St Stephen's Church, Old Radnor

Old Radnor (Welsh: Pencraig) is a village and community in Powys, Wales. The community includes Old Radnor and the villages of Yardro, Dolyhir, Burlingjobb, Evenjobb (Welsh: Einsiob), Kinnerton and Walton. In the 2001 census and the 2011 census the community had a population of 741 (390 male and 351 female) in 323 households. Old Radnor lies on a lane off the A44 to the west of the Wales–England border.

The 15th-century parish church, dedicated to Saint Stephen, is in Perpendicular Gothic style, and is noted for its early organ and organ case, early stained glass, fine rood screen and large pre-Norman font. Adjacent to it are earthworks known as Old Radnor Castle, but it is unclear if this was ever in fact a fortification.

Riddings Brook, a tributary of the River Lugg, starts near Old Radnor. Old Radnor has one pub, the Harp Inn, a 15th-century farm house.

New Radnor, which had replaced Old Radnor as the county town of Radnorshire, is further to the west.

== Governance ==
The Old Radnor electoral ward covers the communities of Old Radnor, New Radnor and Gladestry. It elects one county councillor to Powys County Council. At the 2011 census this ward had a population of 1,562.

In 2018 a Review of Electoral Arrangements proposed that Old Radnor and Gladestry be included with nearby Painscastle under a new ward with the name Glasbury and Old Radnor. If accepted, the proposed change would take effect from the 2022 election.

At the local level, Old Radnor Community Council represents the community. It comprises up to eleven community councillors representing the community wards of Old Radnor/Walton and Kinnerton/Evenjobb.
