= Pembridge railway station =

Former railway station in Herefordshire, England

Pembridge
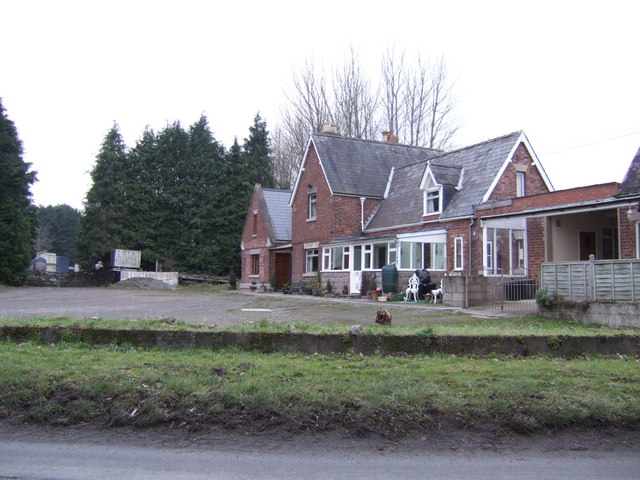
- Pembridge station buildings in 2007

General information
- Location: Pembridge, Herefordshire; England
- Coordinates: 52.2268°N 2.8966°W
- Grid reference: SO388591

Other information
- Status: Disused

History
- Original company: Leominster and Kington Railway
- Pre-grouping: Great Western Railway
- Post-grouping: Great Western Railway

Key dates
- 18 October 1855: opened for goods traffic
- 1857: Opened for passengers
- 1955: Closed
Location

Pembridge railway station was a station in Pembridge, Herefordshire, England. The station was opened to passengers in 1857 and closed in 1955.

The station was located to the north of Pembridge close to Broome Lane.

| Preceding station | Disused railways | Following station |
|---|---|---|
| Marston Halt; Line and station closed | Great Western Railway; Leominster and Kington Railway | Ox House; Line and station closed |
