= Titley Junction railway station =

Former railway station in Herefordshire, England

Titley Junction
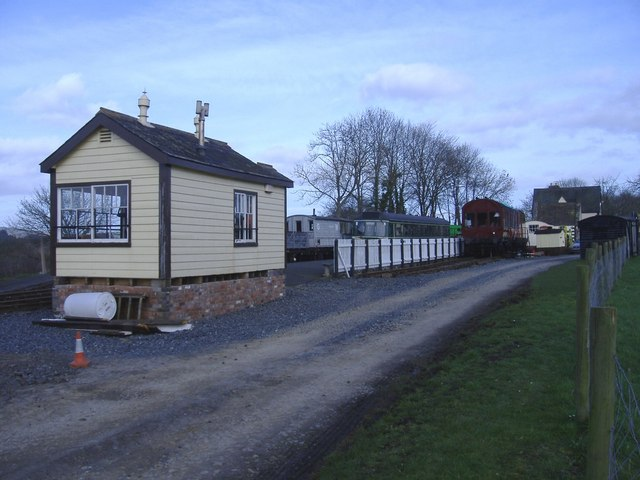
- Titley Junction former station in 2007

General information
- Location: Titley, Herefordshire; England
- Coordinates: 52.2173°N 2.9853°W
- Grid reference: SO327581
- Platforms: 2

Other information
- Status: Disused

History
- Original company: Leominster and Kington Railway
- Pre-grouping: Great Western Railway
- Post-grouping: Great Western Railway

Key dates
- 20 August 1857: Opened
- 1955: closed for passengers
- 1964: Closed completely
Location

Titley Junction railway station was a station in Titley, Herefordshire, England. The station was located nearly 2 miles (3.2 km) south of Titley village.

The station was opened in 1857 and closed completely in 1964. Immediately to the east of the station, the line split for trains traveling south to Eardisley (at least until 1940, when that portion of the line closed) and north-west to Presteigne, Wales. Since closure the station has been restored with track reinstated as a short private railway.

Charles Beeks started his GWR career at Titley Junction as a porter before joining the Royal Flying Corps. For his service in the trenches, Charles Beeks was awarded the Mons Star and King Albert’s Belgian Cross. He received the Distinguished Flying Medal for his flying heroism. He never returned back to the railway and settled in Oxfordshire, the family and relatives still continued to live in Herefordshire and Worcestershire.

Preceding station	Historical railways	Following station
Kington; Line and station closed	Great Western Railway; Leominster and Kington Railway	Forge Crossing Halt; Line and station closed
Kington; Line and station closed	Great Western Railway; Leominster and Kington Railway	Marston Halt; Line and station closed
Kington; Line and station closed	Great Western Railway; Kington and Eardisley Railway	Lyonshall; Line and station closed
