= Gavin Plumley =

British writer and broadcaster (born 1981)

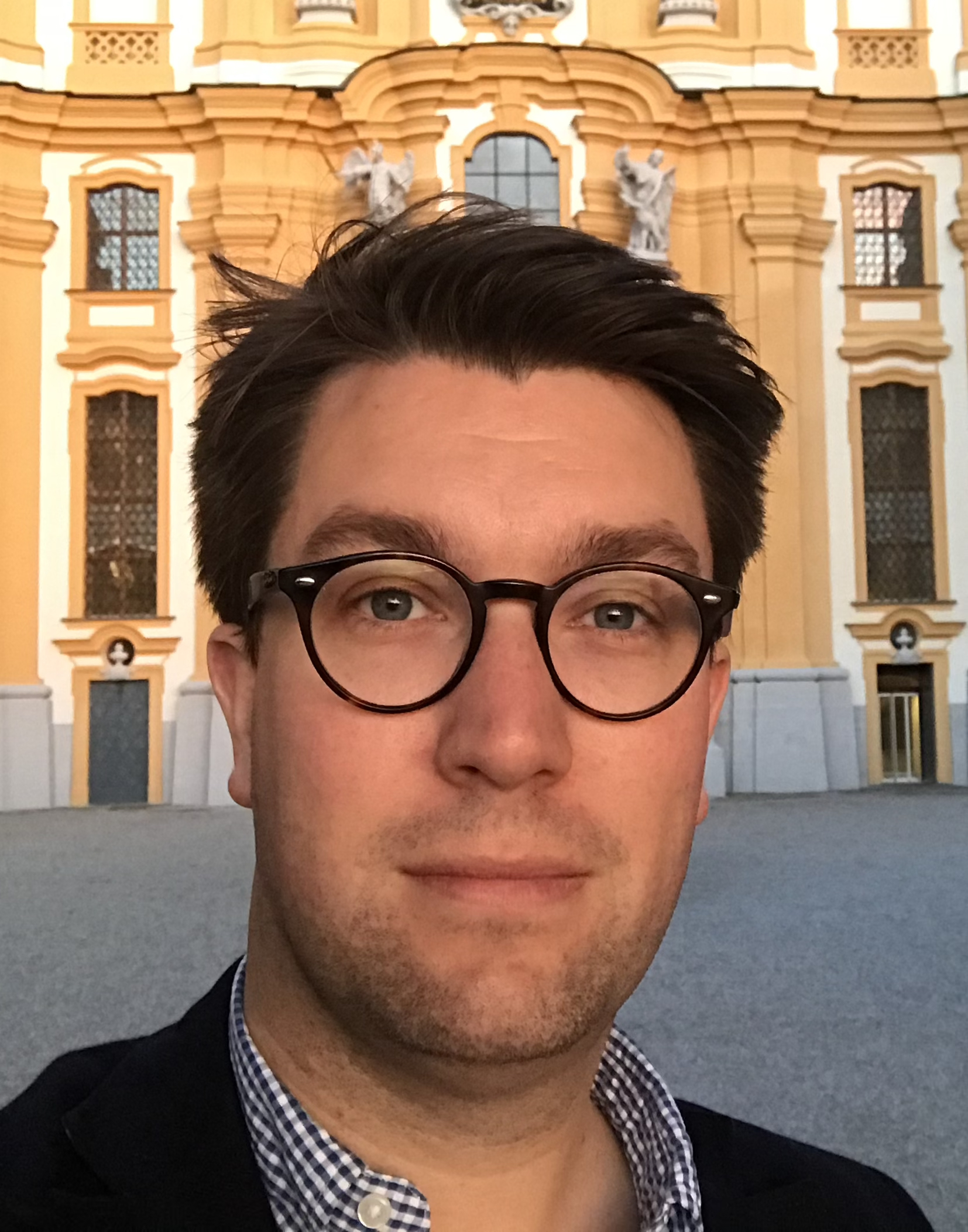
- Gavin Plumley in 2018
- Born: 2 March 1981 (age 45); Dundee, Scotland, UK
- Education: Keble College, Oxford
- Occupations: Cultural Historian, Writer, Broadcaster, Lecturer
- Spouse: Alastair Tighe (m. 2009)
- Writing career
- Genre: Narrative Non-Fiction

Gavin Plumley (born 2 March 1981) is a British cultural historian, writer, lecturer and broadcaster.

== Life ==
Born in Dundee, Gavin Plumley was brought up in Wales, before moving to London, and was educated at Keble College, Oxford. His home is in the village of Pembridge in Herefordshire where he lives with his husband Alastair Tighe, Head Master of Ardingly College, and their dogs Nimrod and Scudder.

== Career ==
Having graduated in 2002, he worked at the Royal Opera House, Covent Garden and as a theatrical agent. Plumley became a freelance writer and broadcaster in October 2011, specialising in the music and culture of Central Europe. He has written about Vienna in 1900, and appeared in the 2023 documentary Klimt and The Kiss.

He has written for Country Life, The Guardian, The Independent on Sunday, Literary Review, The Hudson Review, GQ, Opera, Gramophone, Catholic Herald, and BBC Music Magazine. Plumley has broadcast on BBC Radio 3, including at The Proms, and on BBC Radio 4.

Plumley has written for opera companies such as the Salzburg Festival, where he edited the English-language concert programmes from 2013 to 2021, the Vienna State Opera, the Metropolitan Opera, New York, the Lyric Opera of Chicago, La Monnaie, Brussels, Dutch National Opera, Opera North, Scottish Opera, English National Opera, Welsh National Opera and the Royal Opera House, and for orchestras and concert halls including Carnegie Hall, The Juilliard School, the BBC Symphony Orchestra, the BBC Philharmonic, the CBSO, the LSO and Wigmore Hall.

As well as his work for The Arts Society, both at home and abroad, he has lectured at numerous art galleries, museums, opera houses and concert halls, including the National Theatre, the National Trust, National Gallery, the British Museum, the Neue Galerie, New York, the Royal Opera House, English National Opera, Garsington, Glyndebourne, Wigmore Hall and Southbank Centre.

His first book, A Home for All Seasons, was published in 2022, and is an account of his move to an old house in Pembridge, with musings about the history of the area and the paintings of Pieter Bruegel the Elder. The book was launched at the Hay Festival and at Wigmore Hall.

Plumley's second book, The Gay Apocalypse, is due to be published in 2027. It explores the history of Vienna 1900 through an LGBTQ+ lens, including figures such as Sigmund Freud, Ludwig Wittgenstein and Egon Schiele, as well as the Habsburg court and the wider populace. It will be published in the UK by Little, Brown, in the US by Pegasus Books and in the German-speaking world as Traum und Begehren: Eine diverse Geschichte der Wiener Moderne by the Austrian firm Molden (Styria Media Group).
