= Kington railway station =

Former railway station in Herefordshire, England

Kington
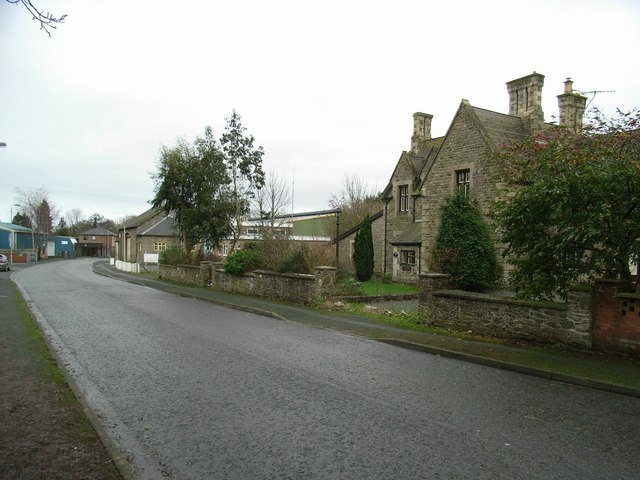
- Former railway station, Kington

General information
- Location: Kington, Herefordshire; England
- Coordinates: 52.2072°N 3.0195°W
- Grid reference: SO304570

Other information
- Status: Disused

History
- Original company: Kington and Eardisley Railway
- Pre-grouping: Great Western Railway
- Post-grouping: Great Western Railway

Key dates
- 20 August 1857: first station opened
- 1875: Resited
- 7 February 1955: Closed to passengers
- 1964: Closed completely
Location

Kington railway station was a station in Kington, Herefordshire, England. Replacing an earlier terminus station which had been opened in 1857, the station was opened in 1875 and closed in 1964. The final passenger service had been on 5 February 1955, and passenger services were withdrawn two days later.

The 1857 station building can still be seen on what is now the Hatton Gardens Industrial Estate.

A model of the station, as it appeared in the mid-1940s, may be viewed at the nearby Kington Museum.

Preceding station	Historical railways	Following station
Stanner; Line and station closed	Great Western Railway; Kington and Eardisley Railway	Titley Junction; Line and station closed
