= Kingsland railway station (England) =

Former railway station in Herefordshire, England

Kingsland
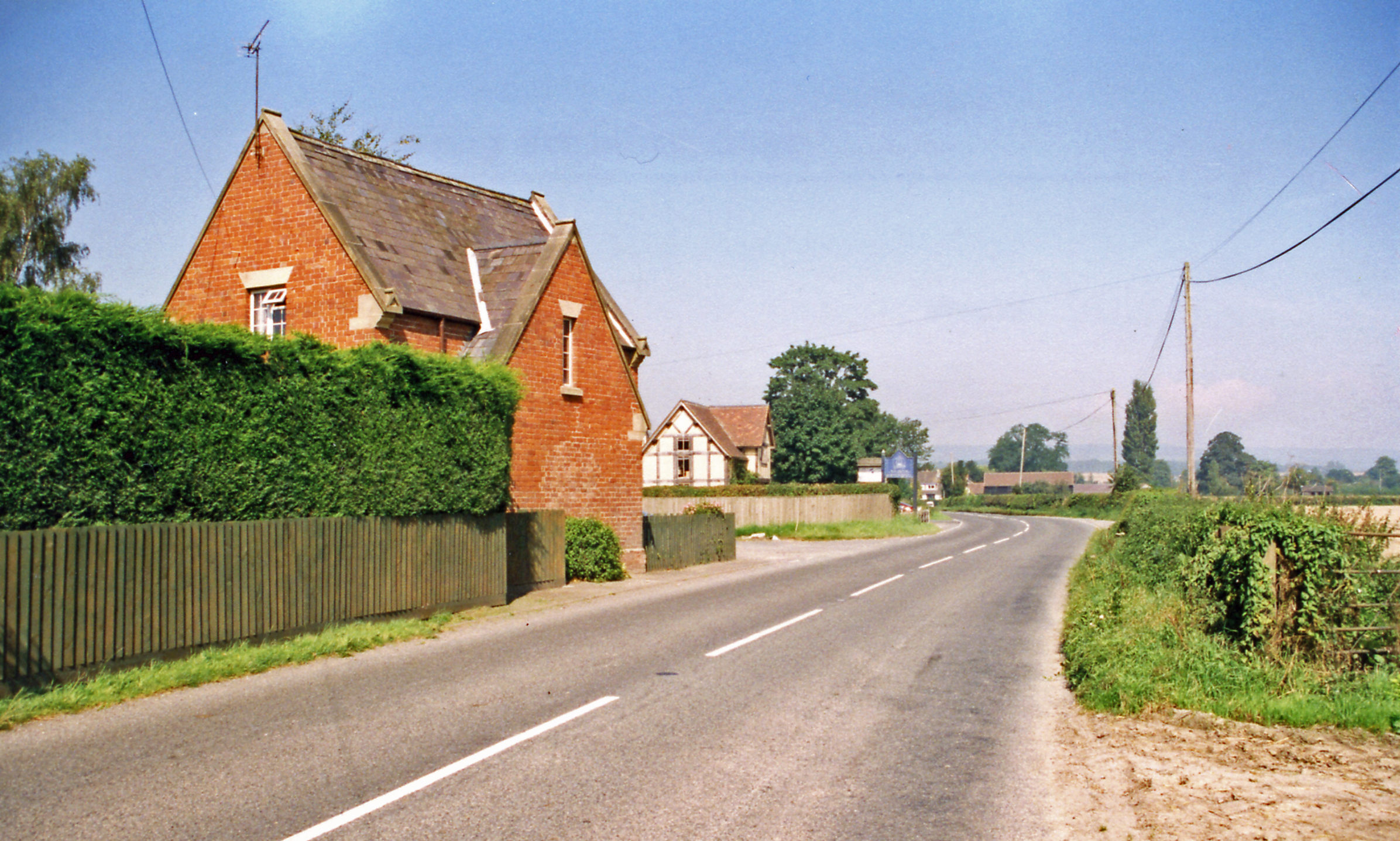
- Kingsland station site in 1999

General information
- Location: Kingsland, Herefordshire; England
- Coordinates: 52.2441°N 2.8210°W
- Grid reference: SO440609

Other information
- Status: Disused

History
- Original company: Leominster and Kington Railway
- Pre-grouping: Great Western Railway
- Post-grouping: Great Western Railway

Key dates
- 20 August 1857: Opened
- 1955: Closed to passengers
- 1964: Closed
Location

Kingsland railway station was a station in Kingsland, Herefordshire, England. The station was opened in 1856, closed to passengers in 1955 and closed completely in 1964.

The station was located south of the village, on the A4110, just north of the Pinsley Brook.

Preceding station	Disused railways	Following station
Ox House; Line and station closed	Great Western Railway; Leominster and Kington Railway	Leominster; Line and station open
