= Louise Skelton =

British equestrian athlete

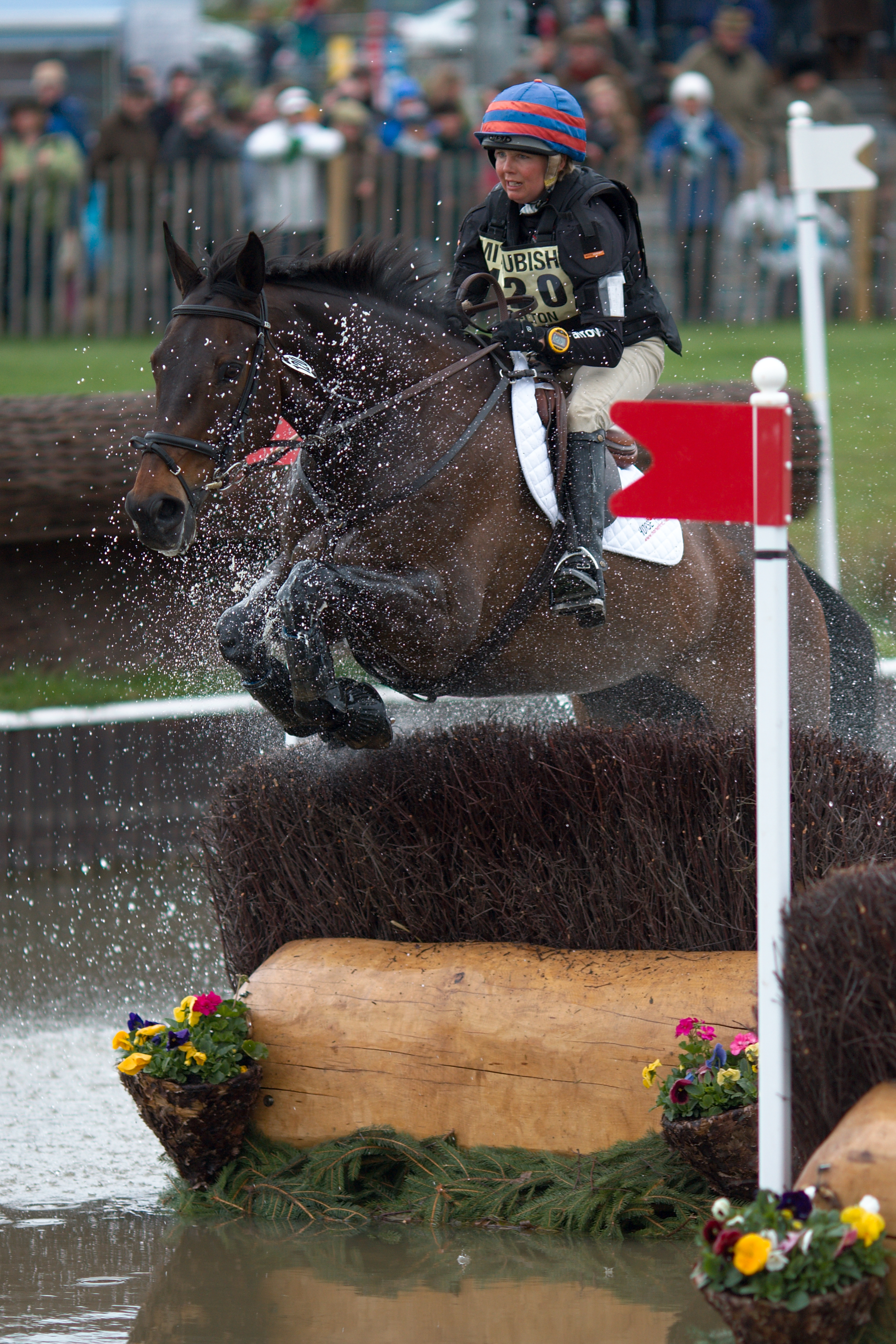
Louise Skelton on Bit Of A Barney at Badminton Horse Trials 2010

Louise Harwood is a British equestrian athlete competing in eventing at top three and four star events, and has won at the CCI *** Blair Castle event. She started her Advanced career on two full brothers, bred by herself, Bit of a Barney and Partly Pickled. In recent years her main CCI**** horses are Mr Potts and Whitson, Louise also has several other horses in events at Intermediate and Novice level. In 2014 Whitson was named British Eventing's Top Horse of 2014, winning the Wide Awake trophy for his breeders Roy and Annie Baker. Louise finished 9th in the rankings for 2014, having placed 13th in a very competitive Etoiles de Pau CCI****, the last event of the season with Whitson.

== Career ==
Skelton has been a professional rider since 2003, and spends her time teaching as well as competing. Skelton is sponsored by Horse First, an Equine Supplements Company. She is based in Eardisley in Herefordshire.

She runs Harwood Eventing in Herefordshire, England. She trains and trades horses, coaches riders, and regularly teaches at local pony clubs.

== Car accident ==
In 1999 she was involved in a car accident that left her in intensive care and with multiple knee and ankle fractures. She was told she may not walk again but set herself the target of recovering to run the London Marathon, which she achieved. In Feb 2014 Louise had a metal pin removed from her leg to allow her to have greater use of her left leg.

== Higher education ==
She achieved a degree in applied biology from Cardiff University in Wales and a post graduate diploma in applied equine science from the Royal Agricultural University in Cirencester, England.

== Other activities ==
She has written articles and reports for the equestrian magazine Horse & Hound.

== See also ==
- Glossary of equestrian terms
- List of equestrian sports
