= Eardisley Park =

Country house in Herefordshire, England

Coordinates: 52.131442°N 3.024032°W

Eardisley Park is a country house and estate to the southwest of the village of Eardisley in Herefordshire, England, and approximately 14 miles (23 km) north-west of Hereford.

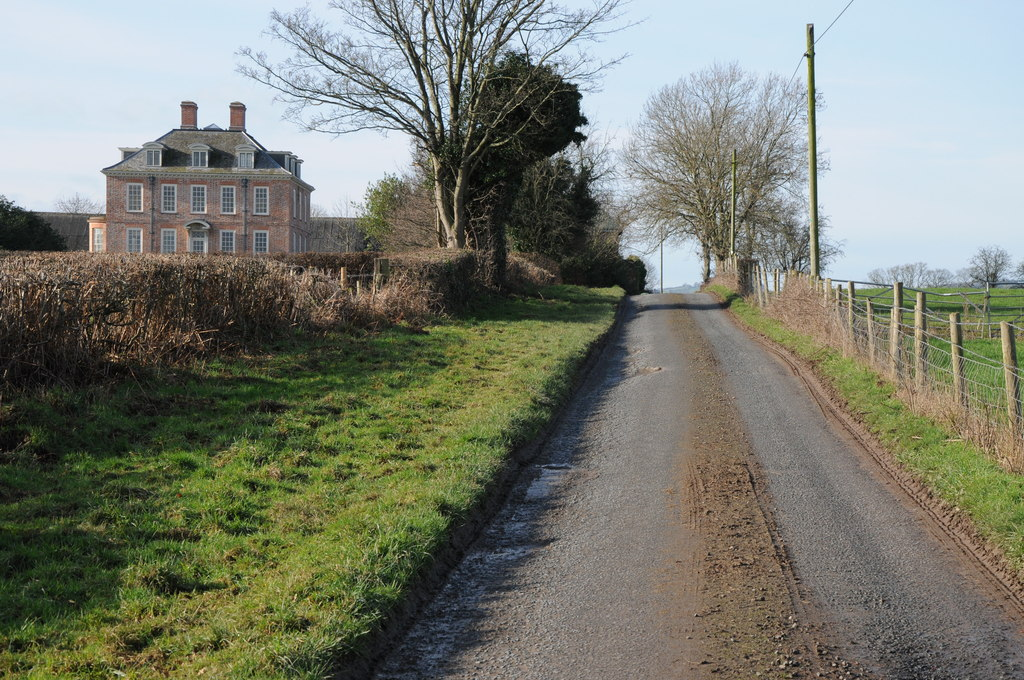
Bridleway to Eardisley Park

== History ==
The grounds were originally the site of Eardisley Castle. A deer park was established during the medieval period for the Baskerville family. The castle was razed after the English Civil War.

In 1777 the estate was mentioned in the Pipe Roll, when the manor, the castle and the park passed to the king upon the death of Sir Richard Baskerville of Duncumb. In the 19th century the estate was in the possession of the Perry family; Thomas Perry was the manor owner in 1837, and James Perry as of 1890.

== House ==
William Barnesley or Barnsley, a London cloth merchant, built the original Queen Anne house in the early 18th century after purchasing the estate. The attic was converted into an additional storey later in the century. The house was a Grade II* listed building but shortly after restoration burnt down in January 1999.

A near replica on the site, using inside bricks facing outwards and old flooring, wall panelling and fittings sourced elsewhere and adding modern systems and steel beams for floor support, was completed in late 2001 and named the Georgian Restoration of the Year in 2003 and the Restoration of the Century for the West Region by Country Life in 2010. Bow windows were added to the front and rear facades in a style suggesting late 18th century additions. The original brick barns and Grade II listed Georgian dovecote survived the fire and rebuilding included restoration of the garden terraces, which had been worked as part of the farm for the previous century.

A legal dispute over the original house following Barnesley's death in 1760 was reportedly the inspiration for Charles Dickens's novel Bleak House.
