= Whitney-on-Wye railway station =

Former railway station in Herefordshire, England

Whitney-on-Wye

General information
- Location: Whitney-on-Wye, Herefordshire; England
- Coordinates: 52.1218°N 3.0763°W
- Grid reference: SO264476

Other information
- Status: Disused

History
- Original company: Hereford, Hay and Brecon Railway
- Pre-grouping: Midland Railway
- Post-grouping: London, Midland and Scottish Railway

Key dates
- 11 July 1864: Opened
- 31 December 1962: Closed
Location

Whitney-on-Wye railway station was a station in Whitney-on-Wye, Herefordshire, England. The station was opened in 1864 and closed in 1962.

Preceding station	Historical railways	Following station
Hay-on-Wye; Line and station closed	London, Midland and Scottish Railway; Hereford, Hay and Brecon Railway	Eardisley; Line and station closed
