= St Stephen's Church, Old Radnor =

Church in Powys, Wales

Coordinates: 52.2249°N 3.0996°W

St Stephen's Church
- Church of St Stephen
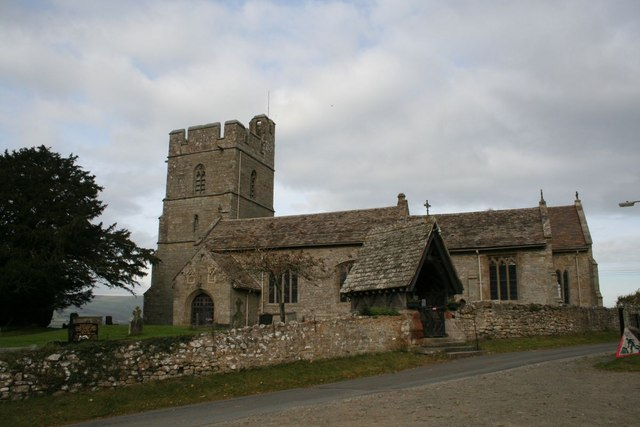
- St Stephen's Church
- Denomination: Church of England
- Previous denomination: Roman Catholic

History
- Former name: St Ystyffan's church
- Status: active

Architecture
- Heritage designation: Grade I
- Designated: 1993

Administration
- Diocese: Diocese of Hereford
- Parish: Old Radnor

St Stephen's Church is a Church of England parish church in Old Radnor, Powys, Wales. It was constructed in the 15th century in perpendicular gothic style on the site of a 6th-century church. It is a grade I listed building.

The organ is listed as being of exceptional interest. The instrument itself is mainly 19th century; however, its elaborate wooden case is very early.

== History ==
Since there is no other church of St Stephen in Wales, it is speculated that the original church might have been dedicated to Ystyffan, a member of the royal family of the Kingdom of Powys, with a number of churches dedicated to him. Following the Norman conquest of Wales, the Normans might have incorrectly believed that Ystyffan was a Welsh reference to Saint Stephen and rededicated the church to the Protomartyr as he was a popular saint with the Normans. In the 1200s, the church was transferred to the Mortimer Family. In 1401 it was destroyed after being burned during the Glyndŵr Rising. Despite the fire, the very large pre-Norman baptismal font, which might be as old as 8th century, survived. It was rebuilt shortly afterwards and the font reinstalled. The new church building was reconstructed with embrasures in the merlons on the parapet, which has led to suggestions that it was intended to be a fortified church. However, beyond the embrasure which was uncommonly used for decoration, there is nothing else on the building that suggested that it was fortified. When it was reconstructed alongside the high altar, there was room for five chantry altars, though one was later shut off to become the vestry. In 1993, the church was granted Grade I listed status.

In the 15th century, a new stained glass window was installed in the church featuring Saint Catherine. Also installed in the church at the time were symbols relating to King Edward IV of England including the White Rose of York and the Black Bull of the Duke of Clarence. In the 16th century, the church underwent renovations with tributes to the House of Tudor. New choir stalls were installed and a new roof was fitted over the nave with Tudor Roses. A new Welsh tracery was also installed during this time. The rood screen is also notably fine.

== Organ ==
St Stephen's Church is reported to have the oldest organ in the British Isles, potentially dating originally to the 15th century, though Cadw states that it is not in its original form. The organ's case dates to the 16th century, and there are suggestions that it was installed before the dissolution of the monasteries, which makes it one of the earliest surviving organ cases.

The future composer and organist of Hereford and Antwerp Cathedrals, John Bull may have been brought up in Old Radnor, in which case he would have learned to play the organ at St Stephen's Church.

It was restored in 1872 by F. H. Sutton, who installed new organ pipes and linenfold panels. Though it is not known why such an organ was installed in a village church, it has been stated that its remote location was a contributing factor to its state of survival.

== Churchyards ==
The main churchyard contains a war grave of a Machine Gun Corps soldier of World War I, and the churchyard extension one of a Manchester Regiment soldier of World War II.

== Referendum ==
In 1914, the Welsh Church Act 1914 was passed by the Parliament of the United Kingdom to disestablish the Church in Wales from the Church of England. Owing the enactment being delayed by the Suspensory Act 1914, nineteen parishes (including Old Radnor) were balloted by the Welsh Church Commissioners in a referendum as to whether they wanted to remain part of the Church of England or join the Church in Wales. This was because their parish boundaries crossed the geographical borders between England and Wales. St Stephen's parishioners voted 344–99 to remain part of the Church of England despite the church being located in Wales. As a result of the decision in the referendum, St Stephen's Church remained a part of the Diocese of Hereford.
