= Stanner =

Stanner may refer to

== People ==
- Bill Stanner (also known as W.E.H. Stanner), an Australian anthropologist and commander of the 2/1st North Australia Observer Unit
- Duncan Stanners, football player who played for Rangers F.C. in the 1953 Scottish Cup Final

== Places in the United Kingdom ==
- Stanner, a hamlet in Radnorshire, Wales
  - Stanner railway station
- Stanner Nab, part of Bulkeley Hill of the Peckforton Hills in Cheshire
- Stanner Rocks, an area of igneous rocks in what is called the Stanner-Hanter district near the Welsh border
- The Stanners, an area on the south bank of the River Tyne in Corbridge, Northumberland

== Other uses ==
- Stanner, a nickname for students and alumni of the Archbishop Molloy High School in Queens, New York City
- Stanner Award, an annual award for Indigenous literature in Australia
