= Yardro =

Hamlet in Powys, Wales

Coordinates: 52°13′17″N 03°08′20″W

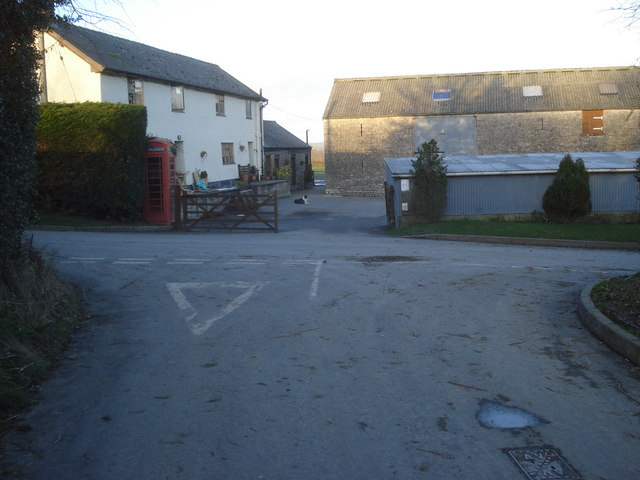
Yardro in January 2008

Yardro (Welsh: Yr Ardro) is a hamlet in Powys, Wales, in the historic county of Radnorshire.

The nearest significant towns are Kington, Herefordshire (over the border in England) and Presteigne (in Powys). New Radnor, which used to be the county town of Radnorshire, is a short distance to the north of Yardro.
