= Stanner Halt railway station =

Former railway station in Powys, Wales

Stanner

General information
- Location: Stanner, Powys; Wales
- Coordinates: 52.2172°N 3.0826°W
- Grid reference: SO260582

Other information
- Status: Disused

History
- Original company: Kington and Eardisley Railway
- Post-grouping: Great Western Railway

Key dates
- 25 September 1875: Opened
- 28 July 1945: Name changed to Stanner Halt
- 5 February 1951: Closed
Location

Stanner railway station was a station in Stanner, Powys, Wales. The station was opened by the Kington and Eardisley Railway in 1875.

| Preceding station | Disused railways | Following station |
|---|---|---|
| Dolyhir; Line and station closed | Great Western Railway; Kington and Eardisley Railway | Kington; Line and station closed |
