= Eardisley Castle =

Castle in Eardisley, Herefordshire, England

Coordinates: 52.13588°N 3.00808°W

Eardisley Castle was in the village of Eardisley in Herefordshire, England, 11 km north-east of Hay-on-Wye (grid reference SO311491). The site of the castle is a scheduled monument.

This was an 11th-century motte and bailey castle with a moat around the bailey filled by a stream. It is recorded in the Domesday Book as being held by Robert (probably Robert de Basqueville, father of Ralph de Baskerville) from Roger de Lacy.

In 1263 the castle was in the possession of Roger de Clifford who imprisoned the Bishop of Hereford, Peter de Aquablanca there. From around 1272 the castle was probably the chief residence of the Baskerville family, although its ownership changed frequently. The de Bohuns, Earls of Hereford, were overlords of Eardisley until 1372 when the earldom of Hereford ceased and it passed to the Crown.

In 1403 Henry IV ordered the castle fortified against attacks by Owain Glyndŵr although by 1372 it had already been recorded as ruined.

By the 1640s the castle was in the possession of Sir Humphrey Baskerville, a Royalist, and was burnt down to the ground during the Civil War, with only one of the gatehouses escaping ruin. A member of the Baskerville family was still living in this ruin in 1670 in comparative poverty.

What remained of the castle was demolished by William Barnesley after he acquired the estate, where he built Eardisley House. The mound and wet ditches are the only traces now remaining. The moat was filled in during the summer of 1972. Archaeological digs took place at the site in 1994 and 2011. In 1994, excavations revealed medieval pottery, tiles and other objects, including a fragment of Roman pottery.
