= Hay Railway =

Horse-drawn tramway in Wales

The Hay Railway was a narrow gauge horse-drawn tramway in the district surrounding Hay-on-Wye in Brecknockshire, Wales. The railway connected Eardisley in Herefordshire, England, with Brecon in Wales. The Brecon terminus was Watton Wharf on the Brecknock and Abergavenny Canal.

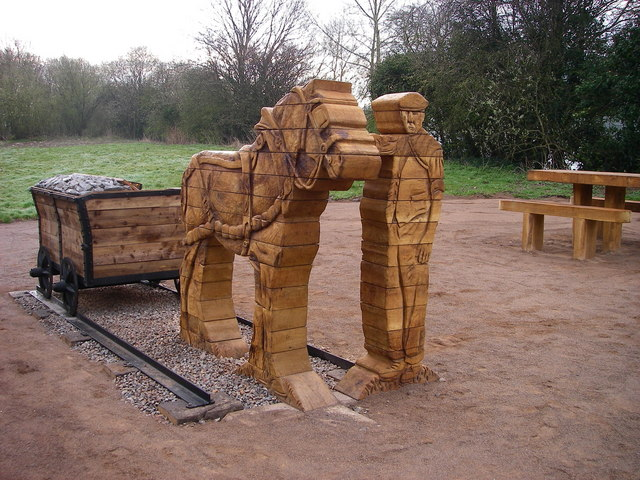
Monument in Brecon.

== Parliamentary authorisation, construction and opening ==
Hay Railway Act 1811
- Act of Parliament
- Parliament of the United Kingdom
- Long title: An Act for making and maintaining a Railway from or near the Public Wharf of the Brecknock and Abergavenny Canal, in the Parish of Saint John the Evangelist, in the County of Brecon, to or near to a certain Place called Parton Cross, in the Parish of Eardisley, in the County of Hereford.
- Citation: 51 Geo. 3. c. cxxii

Dates
- Royal assent: 25 May 1811

Other legislation
- Amended by: Hay Railway Act 1812

Text of statute as originally enacted

Hay Railway Act 1812
- Act of Parliament
- Parliament of the United Kingdom
- Long title: An Act for enabling the Company of Proprietors of the Hay Railway to amend, vary, and extend the Line of the said Railway, and for altering and enlarging the Powers of an Act passed in the Fifty-first Year of the Reign of His present Majesty, for making and maintaining the said Railway.
- Citation: 52 Geo. 3. c. cvi

Dates
- Royal assent: 20 May 1812

Other legislation
- Amends: Hay Railway Act 1811

The railway was authorised by the Hay Railway Act 1811 (51 Geo. 3. c. cxxii) on 25 May 1811. Construction of its winding 24-mile (39 km) long route took nearly five years and the line was opened on 7 May 1816. The tramway was built to a gauge of 3 ft 6 in (1,067 mm). The railway adopted the use of cast-iron L-shaped tramroad plates in its construction. The vertical portions of the two plates were positioned inside the wheels of the tramway wagons and the plates were spiked to stone blocks for stability. The size of the stones, and their spacing, was such that the horses could operate unimpeded.

== Operation of the railway ==
From 1 May 1820, the Hay Railway was joined at its Eardisley terminus, in an end on junction, by the Kington Tramway. Together, the two lines totalled 36 miles (58 km) in length, comprising the longest continuous plateway to be completed in the United Kingdom.

The Hay Railway operated through rural areas on the borders of England and Wales and was built to transport goods and freight. Passengers were not carried on any official basis. Although wagons were horse-drawn there was an account in 1841 of an 'ingenious' man-powered vehicle, which was propelled by means of cogs and hand winch operated by two men seated on the vehicle. They travelled from Kington to Brecon at about 5 to 6 mph (8.0 to 9.7 km/h), loaded up with a ton of coal and returned the next day. They broke their journey for refreshments at the Hay Gas-House, during which time children played with the machine and broke one of the wheels. As a result of the damage the men had to push the machine to Eardisley, whereas they had been headed to Kington.

Hay Railway Act 1860
- Act of Parliament
- Parliament of the United Kingdom
- Long title: An Act for vesting the Hay Railway in the Hereford, Hay, and Brecon Railway Company, and for dissolving the Hay Railway Company, and for other Purposes.
- Citation: 23 & 24 Vict. c. clxxix

Dates
- Royal assent: 6 August 1860

Text of statute as originally enacted

The Hay Railway was absorbed into the Hereford, Hay and Brecon Railway by virtue of the Hay Railway Act 1860 (23 & 24 Vict. c. clxxix) and the line was converted to standard gauge for operation by steam locomotives.

== See also ==
- Hay-on-Wye railway station
- Wagonway
