= Dolyhir =

Coordinates: 52.20°N 03.11°W

- Location within Powys
- OS grid reference: SO2457
- Principal area: Powys
- Country: Wales
- Sovereign state: United Kingdom
- Post town: Presteigne
- Postcode district: LD8
- Dialling code: 01544
- Police: Dyfed-Powys
- Fire: Mid and West Wales
- Ambulance: Welsh
- UK Parliament: Brecon, Radnor and Cwm Tawe
- Senedd Cymru – Welsh Parliament: Brecon & Radnorshire

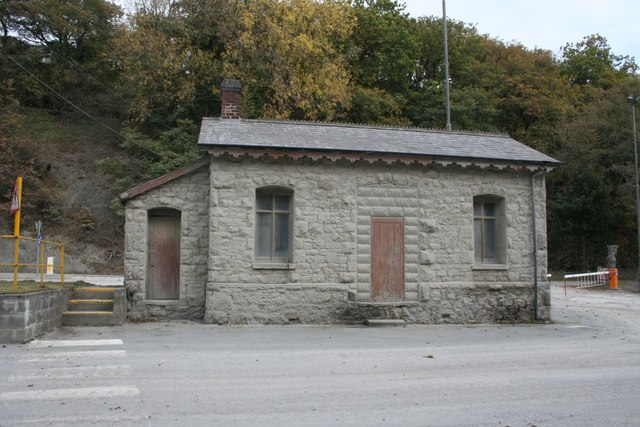
Dolyhir station building

Dolyhir is a small settlement in Powys, Wales. It is near the A44 road and is 19 miles (31 km) northwest of the city of Hereford.

Dolyhir railway station was located next to the former quarry, which contains notable fossils.
