= New Radnor =

Village in Powys, Wales

New Radnor: Welsh: Maesyfed
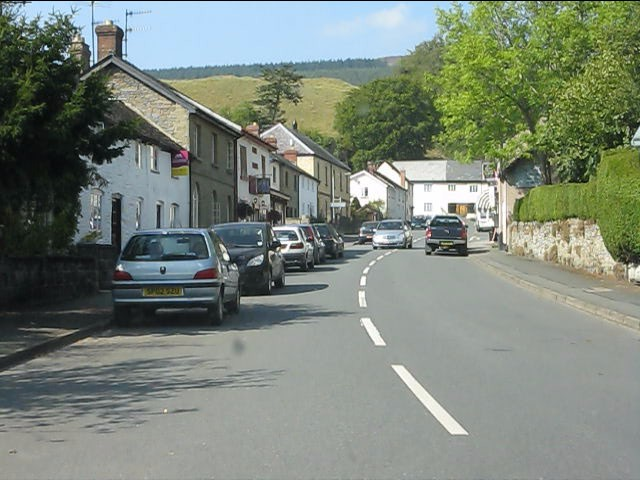
- Broad St. New Radnor, 2011

- Location within Powys
- Population: 409 (2011)
- OS grid reference: SO212609
- Principal area: Powys
- Preserved county: Powys
- Country: Wales
- Sovereign state: United Kingdom
- Post town: PRESTEIGNE
- Postcode district: LD8
- Dialling code: 01544
- Police: Dyfed-Powys
- Fire: Mid and West Wales
- Ambulance: Welsh
- UK Parliament: Brecon, Radnor and Cwm Tawe
- Senedd Cymru – Welsh Parliament: Brecon & Radnorshire
- List of places UK Wales Powys 52.24°N 3.16°W Community map: Map of the community

New Radnor (Welsh: Maesyfed) is a village and community in Powys, Wales. It is south of Radnor Forest, and was historically the county town of Radnorshire.

In the 2001 census, the community's population of 410 was split evenly between male and female, in 192 households. The population at the 2011 census was 409. The community includes the village of Llanfihangel Nant Melan.

== Medieval planned layout ==
The village lies by the Radnor Forest and has been said to have been built to replace Old Radnor. It was a planned medieval walled town with streets laid out in a grid pattern. It was linked to other settlements nearby and regionally such as Builth, Presteigne and Kington Castle and later Huntington Castle near Gladestry.

== The castle ==
Attractions in the village include a significant castle mound of a Norman motte . New Radnor castle was originally called Trefaesyfed and was once a considerable fortress and a significant border castle in the Welsh Marches and played its part in the turmoil, violence and barbarity of the early medieval period typical of such a site.

The first castle at New Radnor may have been built by William Fitz Osbern earl of Hereford. Certainly he held the land by the time of his death in 1071 and the layout of the powerful castle suggests that it was built by a man of great influence. Soon after 1086 New Radnor was granted to Philip de Braose. It may have been at this time that ten minor castles were built nearby to strengthen the Norman hold on the district.

== Welsh attacks ==
In the aftermath of the battle of Dingestow New Radnor Castle was seized by the sons of Einion Clud of Elfael. Einion o'r Porth and Rhys ap Gruffydd of Deheubarth entertained Baldwin of Exeter, Archbishop of Canterbury and Giraldus Cambrensis here in 1188 during their famous tour of Wales recruiting for The Crusades. Einion was killed by his brother in 1191 and in 1195 Matilda de St Valery was probably responsible for retaking the castle for her husband William de Braose. As a result, the previous overlord Rhys ap Gruffydd returned and sacked the castle before winning the battle of Radnor against Roger Mortimer and Hugh de Say.

Rhys died in 1197 and by 1200 William de Braose was back at Radnor Castle. In 1208 King John took the castle from the rebellious de Braose, only to lose it in 1215 to Giles de Braose, Bishop of Hereford. In August 1216 King John and Gwallter Clud the brother of Einion o'r Porth burned the castle in revenge.

After the death of the last Braose of Radnor the castle was taken into royal or crown custody but was destroyed by Prince Llywelyn ab Iorwerth in 1231. In 1233 it was illegally rebuilt by Richard, 1st Earl of Cornwall and then passed to the young Roger Mortimer of Wigmore Castle. In 1264 Prince Llywelyn ap Gruffudd allied with Simon de Montfort, 6th Earl of Leicester took and again destroyed the castle. In all the castle had changed hands twelve times in only eighty years. On four of these occasions the castle was said to have been 'destroyed'.

== Owain Glyndŵr ==
The castle was said to have been attacked and destroyed by Owain Glyndŵr and his forces during his rebellion of 1400 to 1412. Owain's forces allegedly attacked it in either 1401 or 1403, capturing the garrison of sixty men inside, whom he then hanged from the curtain walls over the battlements, then beheaded and buried nearby. Human bones were accidentally disturbed during excavations for church rebuilding in 1843 and as they were excavated it was noted that the skulls were piled separately to the skeletons. They were unceremoniously piled in a mass grave.

It has since been proved that this story of the castle's fall and the massacre of the garrison in 1403 is a much later legend that has no basis in fact.

== Later history ==
By 1405 King Henry IV of England had regained the castle and garrisoned it with a new force of thirty men-at-arms and one hundred and fifty archers under the command of Richard, Lord Grey. This force was more suitable for the defence of the castle and posed a deterrent to another Welsh attack.

Radnor castle then gently fell into decay in the more peaceful times and by 1538 only one tower remained habitable and that was used as the county prison. The castle was in the care of the Earls of Pembroke in the reign of James I and then passed to Lord Powis.

During the English Civil War the castle was visited by King Charles I in 1642 but after a siege was captured and dismantled by Parliamentary forces to prevent it becoming a Royalist stronghold again, a process known as slighting.

== The medieval castle remains ==
The castle was described as being nearly square with massive square towers at three corners and two smaller round towers covering the now village. There were still walls standing in 1840 but today only the earthworks remain. The rest of the stonework must have been used as a ready supply of cut stone and was depleted by the local people for their homes and farms and some became buried, emerging in digging in the 19th century. The earthworks consist of a large mound or motte, protected to the north by a double ditch, probably built by the earl of Cornwall in 1233. Beyond this is a large bailey with the foundations of a rectangular building within it. The village is still surrounded by remains of the town earthwork banks which are especially visible to the south-west. The layout of the then town within the banks might suggest that New Radnor started life as a Roman town or Saxon burgh although there is no evidence for this and it is most likely a planned medieval layout, possibly on the 13th century, when three murage grants were made to the town.

== County town status ==
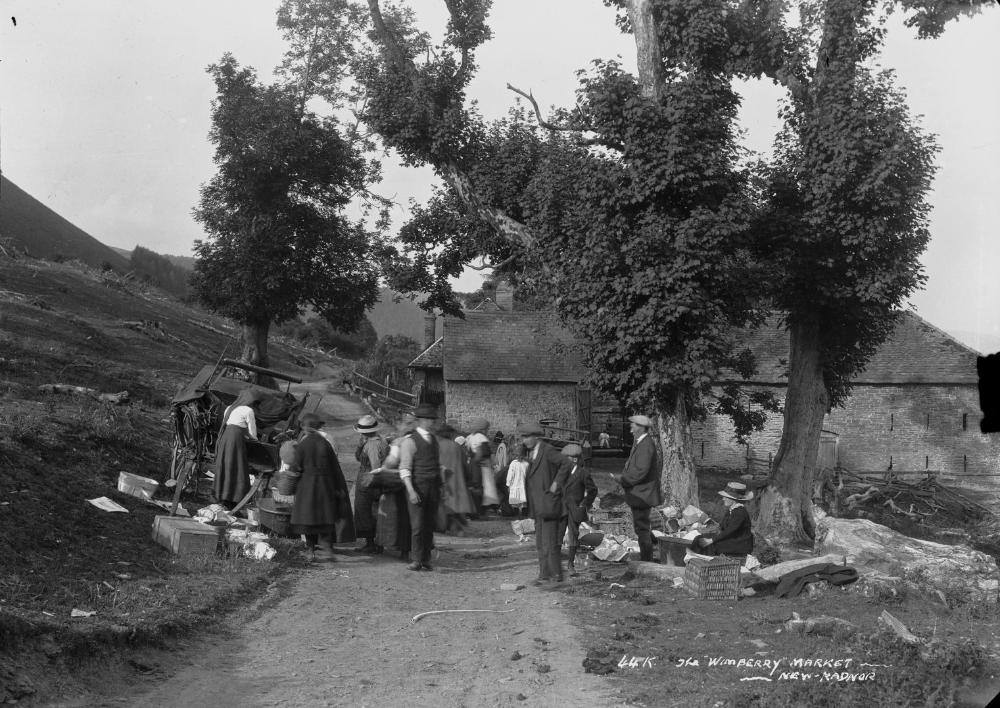
The "Wimberry" market New Radnor, c. 1910s

New Radnor when it was the county town had its own Court. This later moved to Presteigne. The old Town Hall on Broad Street has been demolished.

The parliamentary seat of Radnor was sometimes involved in turbulent local politics, as in 1693 when two rival families the Lewis's (Whigs) and the Harley's (Tories) met on the High Street in New Radnor and drew swords, such was the bad blood between them. One man involved, later Sir Robert Harley, 1st Earl of Oxford and Mortimer, becoming MP, three times Speaker of the House of Commons and also Chancellor of the Exchequer in 1710 and later Lord High Treasurer, and very nearly Prime Minister. But he was to be dismissed by the Queen, imprisoned in The Tower in 1715. He died in 1724 and is buried in Brampton Bryan.

While it was historically a town, following its reduction in size and importance, it is now referred to as a village.

== New Radnor monument ==
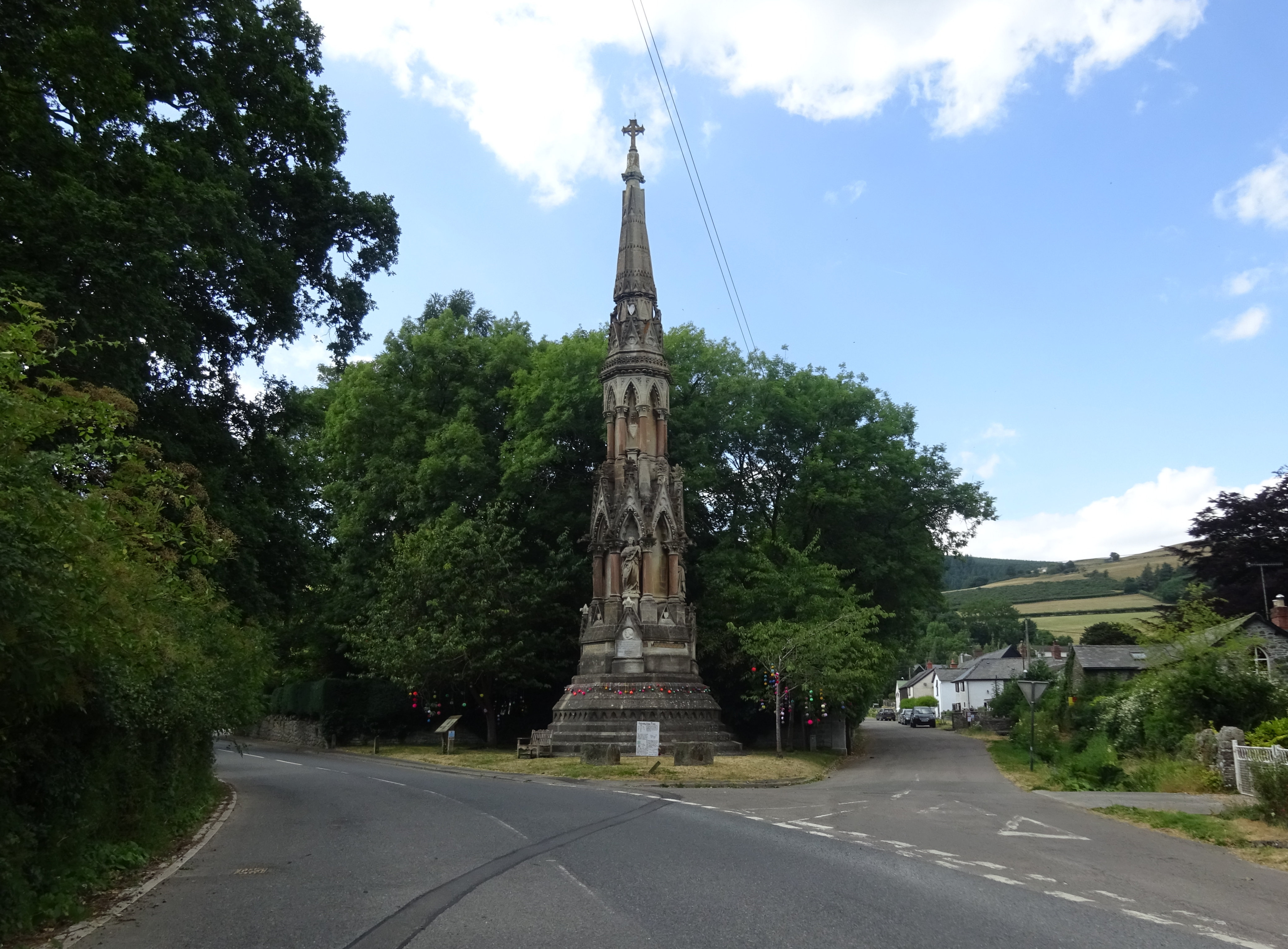

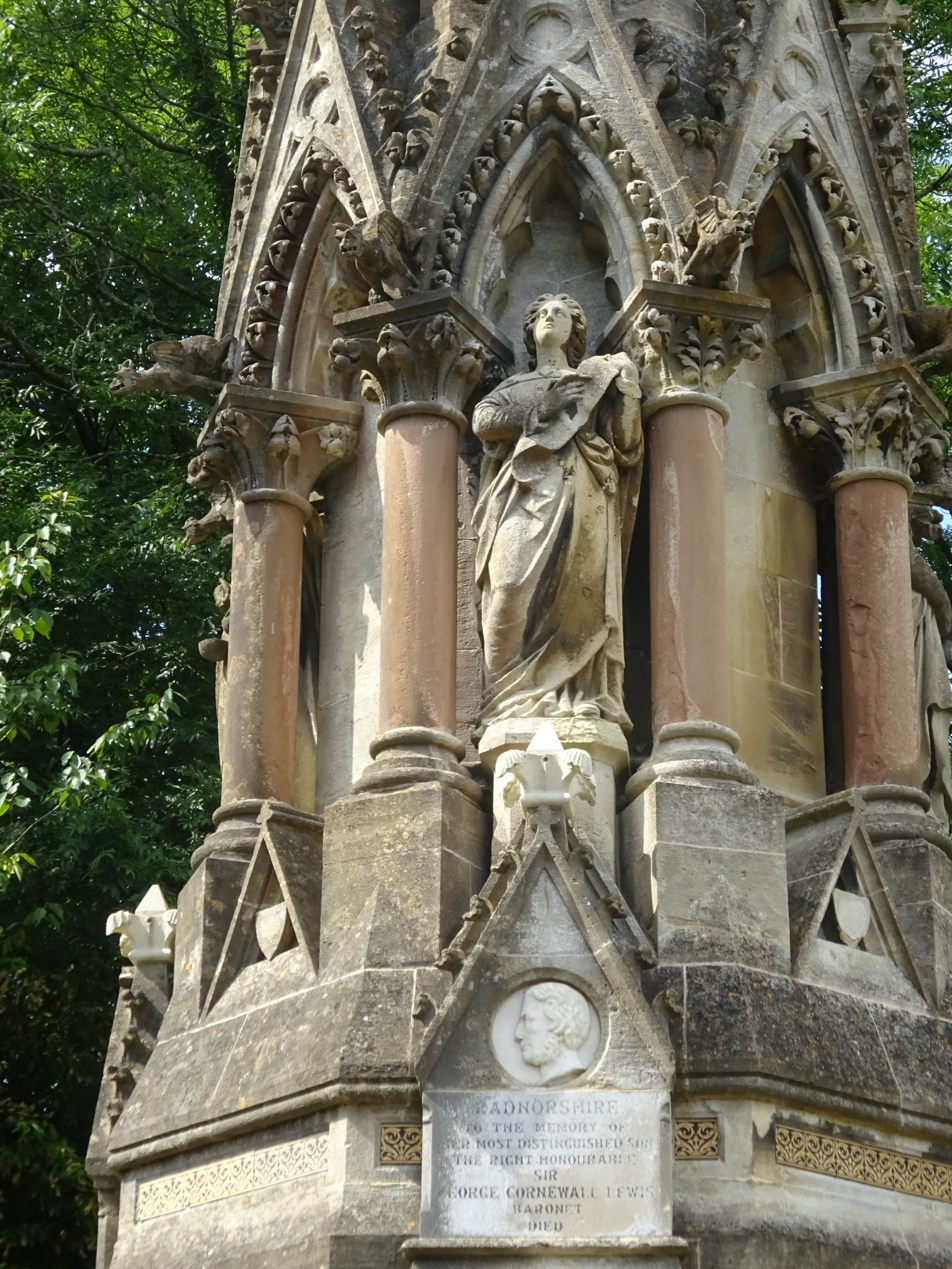

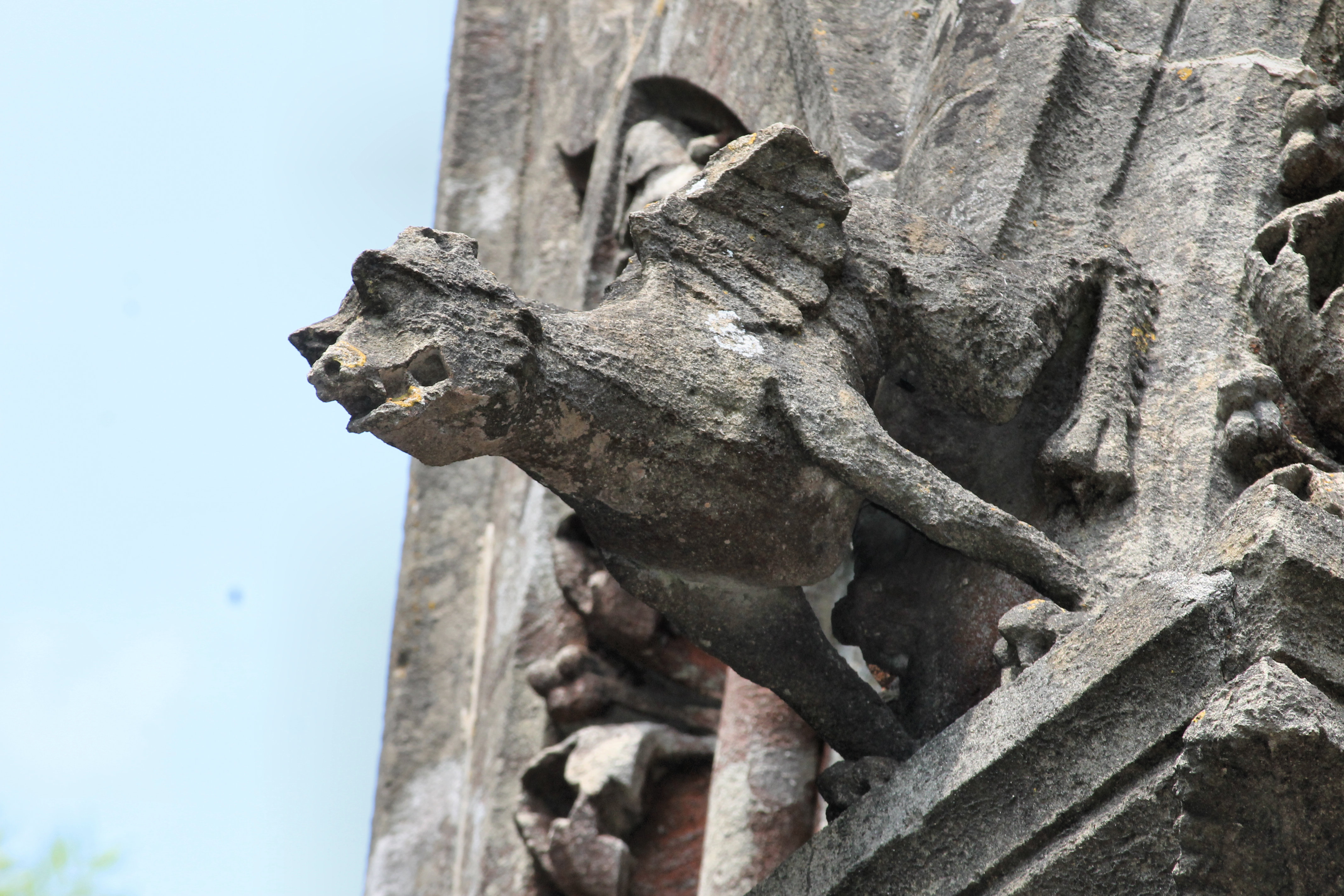

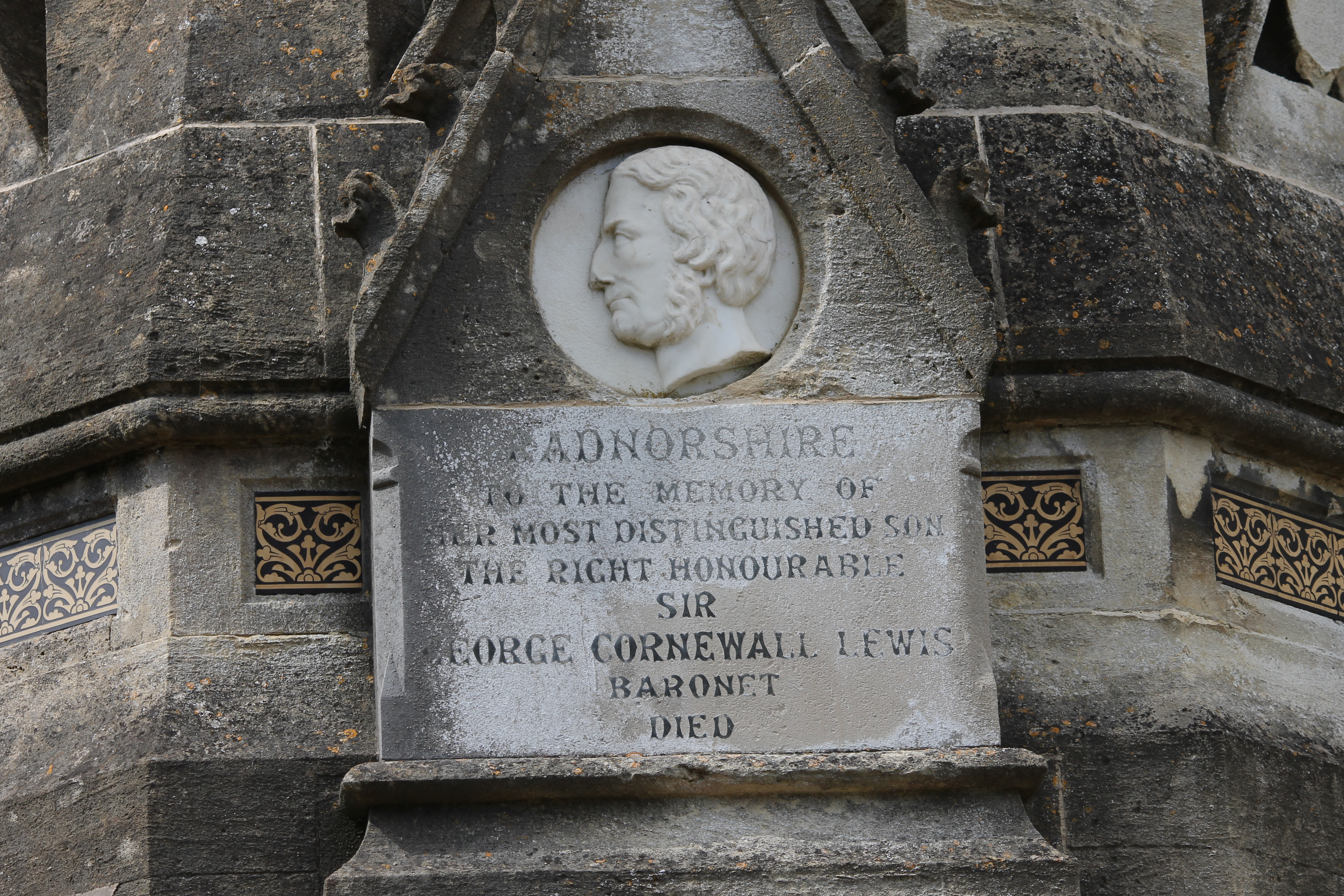

There is a large monument in the village which is a Grade II* listed structure and stands at approximately 77 ft tall. The monument was built in memory of Sir George Cornewall Lewis (1806–1863) and designed in High Victorian Gothic style by John Gibbs. Sir George was the son of Sir Thomas Frankland Lewis of Harpton Court near New Radnor. The family owned large estates and were powerful men both sides of the border. Sir George became a lawyer and went on to become the MP for Herefordshire. He also served as Chancellor of the Exchequer, Home Secretary and Secretary of State for War. In the last decade the monument has fallen into a state of disrepair and has had to be sealed off from the general public. But in September 2001 the local authorities agreed to pay out on renovation work for the monument. As of February 2009, the monument is again fenced off and awaiting repair, and has been for more than two years. There seems to be some doubt as to which body is responsible for its upkeep. As of January 2012, the monument has undergone repair and is accessible again.

== Rural area and tourism ==
New Radnor's main sources of income and employment are still from farming and agriculture. Today there are also smaller businesses such as cider making, picture framing and holiday homes, bed & breakfast establishments and tourism in general. There is also a quarry nearby which employs local people. The stone is known locally for being extremely hard.

== Railway history ==
With ambitions for an east–west railway line to Aberystwyth, the Kington and Eardisley Railway extended the Leominster and Kington Railway from Kington, Herefordshire, England. Other than the small station 1/2 mile (0.80 km) from the town, the plans never came to fruition, only allowing services on the Great Western Railway to both Leominster and onwards to London Paddington. The station closed to passengers in February 1951, and for freight in December 1951.

== Sport ==
The village has a football club called Radnor Valley Football Club.

Harpton Golf Club (now defunct) was founded in 1909. The club and course closed in 1934.

== Amenities ==
There is a chapel, a church, a village hall, a war memorial and a primary school teaching approx 80 pupils. The village Post Office closed in 2008.

== Notable people ==
- John Henry Hutton FRAI (1885–1968) anthropologist and administrator in the Indian Civil Service during the period of the British Raj.
