= Kington and Eardisley Railway =

Railway in England

Overview
- Status: closed
- Owner: Kington and Eardisley Railway until Great Western Railway buy out in 1897
- Locale: Herefordshire
- Termini: New Radnor; Eardisley
- Stations: 8

Service
- Type: Heavy rail
- Operator(s): Great Western Railway

History
- Opened: 3 August 1874 to Eardisley, 25 September 1875 to New Radnor
- Closed: 1 July 1940 to Eardisley, 31 December 1951 to New Radnor, 1958 remainder of line

Technical
- Line length: 13 miles (21 km)
- Track gauge: 1,435 mm (4 ft 8 1/2 in) standard gauge

The Kington and Eardisley Railway took over the Kington Tramway, which served the Welsh Marches border town of Kington, Herefordshire. In 1874 it opened a 6 miles 72 chains (11.1 km) line south from Titley Junction to a junction with the Hereford, Hay and Brecon Railway, 5 chains (330 ft; 100 m) east of Eardisley. A year later it replaced the remainder of the tramway with a branch west to New Radnor. Between these two branches it had running powers on the Titley Junction to Kington section of the Leominster and Kington Railway. The Eardisley branch closed in 1940, the New Radnor branch in 1951.

== History ==
The two branches cost £263,459 to build, of which £5,100 was lent by the Great Western Railway (GWR). Under the Great Western Railway (Additional Powers) Act 1897 (60 & 61 Vict. c. ccxlviii), the company was bought by the GWR on 1 July 1897. Debenture shares were bought for £62 10s per £100 share and ordinary £100 shares for £2.

=== Titley Junction – Eardisley ===
Kington and Eardisley Railway Act 1862
- Act of Parliament
- Parliament of the United Kingdom
- Long title: An Act for the Incorporation of a Company for making a Railway from Kington to Eardisley, with a Branch therefrom; and for vesting in such Company a Tramroad called "the Kington Railway," and enabling them to appropriate Portions of such Tramroad for the Purposes of their Undertaking; and for other Purposes.
- Citation: 25 & 26 Vict. c. lxvii

Dates
- Royal assent: 30 June 1862

When the Hay Tramway was authorised for conversion to a railway in 1859, it was decided that its extension, the Kington Tramway, would also need to be converted. The tramway shares were bought for £45 for each £100 share by an agreement dated 19 December 1861. The Kington and Eardisley Railway Act 1862 (25 & 26 Vict. c. lxvii) received royal assent on 30 June 1862, authorising the company to raise £100,000, buy and convert the Kington Tramway to standard gauge and build a link from Lyonshall to Marston, which was never built. Thomas Savin, the railway contractor, backed the scheme, though his £16,000 of shares were sold when he went bankrupt in January 1866. Running powers over the Leominster and Kington Railway from Kington to Titley Junction were agreed on 14 April 1868. The line opened on 3 August 1874.

=== Kington - New Radnor ===
Kington and Eardisley Railway Act 1873
- Act of Parliament
- Parliament of the United Kingdom
- Long title: An Act to authorise the Kington and Eardisley Railway Company to make a Railway from the Leominster and Kington Railway at Kington to New Radnor, and for other purposes.
- Citation: 36 & 37 Vict. c. lxxix

Dates
- Royal assent: 16 June 1873

After the Leominster and Kington Railway opened to Kington in 1857, most of the lime traffic from Burlinjobb (between Dolyhir and Stanner) was transferred from the 3 feet 6 inches (1.07 m) tramway (from 1862 owned by the Kington and Eardisley Railway) to the railway at Kington. The lime traffic was increasing and it was hoped to build a railway to Rhayader and Aberystwyth, so the Kington and Eardisley Railway got an act of Parliament, the Kington and Eardisley Railway Act 1873 (36 & 37 Vict. c. lxxix), for a railway from Kington to New Radnor, mainly parallel to the tramway, on 16 June 1873. It opened on 25 September 1875.

== Operations ==
All the lines were worked by the GWR from their Kington shed using two locos. Initially they were 0-6-0 saddle tanks, then from about 1900 0-4-2 and 2-4-0 tanks, and finally GWR 5800 Class tanks. Passenger trains were formed of three or four coach sets of four wheelers, until eight wheel coaches were introduced in the late 1920s. Both branches were worked on the train staff system.

== Closure ==
The Eardisley branch never carried much regular traffic and closed on 1 January 1917 (the list of stations closed in 1917 shows at least 125 others closed for wartime economy). Its rails were shipped overseas. It reopened with one train a day from Titley to Almeley on 18 September 1922 and fully on 11 December 1922. Wartime brought final closure on 1 July 1940.

Stanner became an unstaffed halt from April 1938 and coal shortages (explained in a House of Commons speech as due to weather and productivity declines) stopped all passenger trains to New Radnor from 5 February 1951. The line from Dolyhir to New Radnor closed completely from 31 December 1951 and the rest of the line in 1958
