= Eardisley =

Village and civil parish in Herefordshire, England

Coordinates: 52.139°N 3.008°W

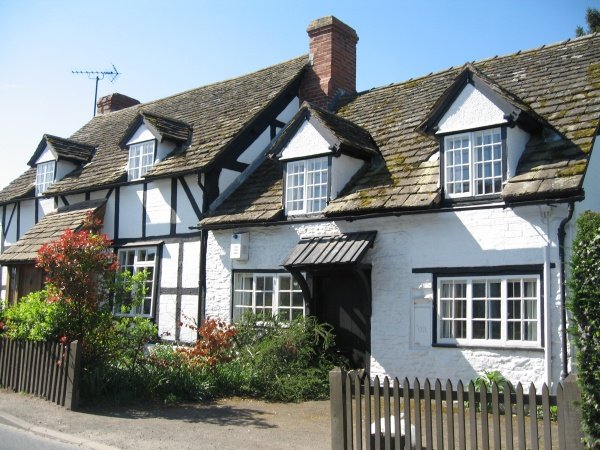

- Location within Herefordshire
- Population: 754 (2011 census)
- OS grid reference: SO3149
- Civil parish: Eardisley
- Unitary authority: County of Herefordshire
- Ceremonial county: Herefordshire
- Region: West Midlands
- Country: England
- Sovereign state: United Kingdom
- Post town: Hereford
- Postcode district: HR3
- Dialling code: 01544
- Police: West Mercia
- Fire: Hereford and Worcester
- Ambulance: West Midlands
- UK Parliament: North Herefordshire
- Website: Eardisley Group Parish Council

Eardisley (/ˈɜːrdzli/) is a village and civil parish in Herefordshire about 5 miles (8.0 km) south of the centre of Kington. Eardisley is in the Wye valley in the northwest of the county, close to the border with Wales.

The village is part of the "Black and white village trail", having many timber-framed buildings along its high street. Recent dendrochronology dating work on timbers in these buildings has revealed that some parts date back to the 14th century.

== History ==
Recorded as Herdeslege in 1086, Eierdesl' in 1249 and Erdesleye in 1269, the name is believed to derive from an Old English personal name, perhaps Ægheard. Eardisley Park estate includes the site of Eardisley Castle. The manor house built during the Georgian period burned down in 1999 and was replaced with a replica in 2003.

== Churches ==
=== St Mary Magdalene ===
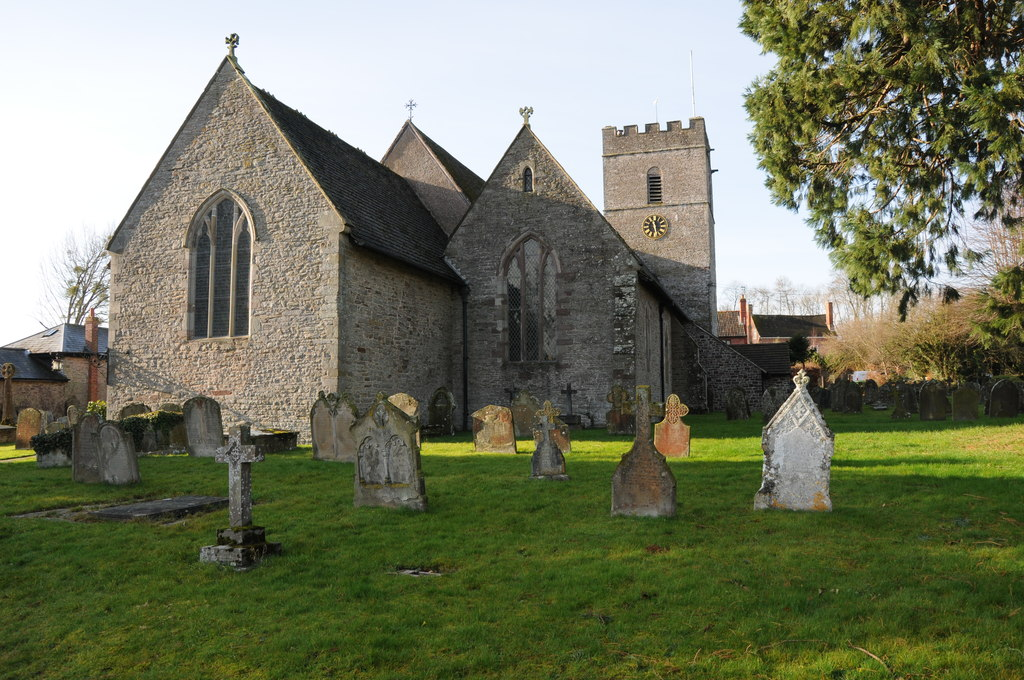
St Mary Magdalene's church

The Church of England parish church of St. Mary Magdalene is a 12th-century building noted for its font, carved in about 1150. It is a Norman work of the Herefordshire School and bears some resemblance to the carvings at Kilpeck in south Herefordshire. It combines intricate Celtic knotwork patterns with dramatic scenes, including the Harrowing of Hell and two knights fighting. It is a grade I listed building.

The south aisle windows were renewed by the Gothic Revival architect Ewan Christian in 1863.

George Coke, Bishop of Hereford, was buried here. The churchyard extension contains the Commonwealth war graves of a Herefordshire Regiment soldier of World War I and a Royal Engineers soldier and a Voluntary Aid Detachment nurse of World War II.

=== Eardisley Methodist Church ===
Eardisley Methodist Church in Woodseaves Road is in the Shropshire and Marches Methodist Circuit. It opened in 1867 as Eardisley Primitive Methodist Church.

== Hay Railway ==
The Hay Railway was an early narrow gauge horse tramway that connected Eardisley with Watton Wharf on the Brecknock and Abergavenny Canal in Brecon. From 1 May 1820, the Hay Railway was joined at its Eardisley terminus, in an end-on junction, by the Kington Tramway. Together, the two lines totalled 36 miles (58 km) in length, comprising the longest continuous plateway to be completed in the United Kingdom. The Hay railway operated through rural areas on the borders of England and Wales and was built to transport goods and freight. Passengers were not carried on any official basis. The Hay Railway was absorbed into the Hereford, Hay and Brecon Railway in 1860 and the line was converted to standard gauge for operation by steam locomotives.

== Amenities ==
Eardisley has two public houses, the Tram Inn and The New Strand. The New Strand is the headquarters for the North West Herefordshire Pool League which incorporates the Eardisley Summer Pool League and the Portway Winter Pool League.

The New Strand is also headquarters to the Hay and District Darts League & the Weobley and District Darts League.

The parish has a Women's Institute. The village holds the annual Eardisley Flower Show on August Bank Holiday each year.

== Notable people ==
- Louise Skelton, British equestrian athlete
- Jessica Raine, British actress

== Sources ==
- Pevsner, Nikolaus (1963). Herefordshire. The Buildings of England. Harmondsworth: Penguin Books. pp. 120–122.
