= Leominster and Kington Railway =

Railway line in England

Leominster and Kington Railway was one of four branches which served the Welsh Marches border town of Kington, Herefordshire.

Opened in August 1857, its peak was during World War II, when it served two US Army hospitals. Declining after the war due to competition from buses, it closed to passengers in 1955, and to freight from 1964.

Today, a 1-mile (1.6 km) section is preserved at Titley Junction railway station.

== Construction ==
Leominster and Kington Railway Act 1854
- Act of Parliament
- Parliament of the United Kingdom
- Long title: An Act for making a Railway from the Shrewsbury and Hereford Railway at Leominster to Kington in Herefordshire.
- Citation: 17 & 18 Vict. c. cxliv

Dates
- Royal assent: 10 July 1854

Text of statute as originally enacted

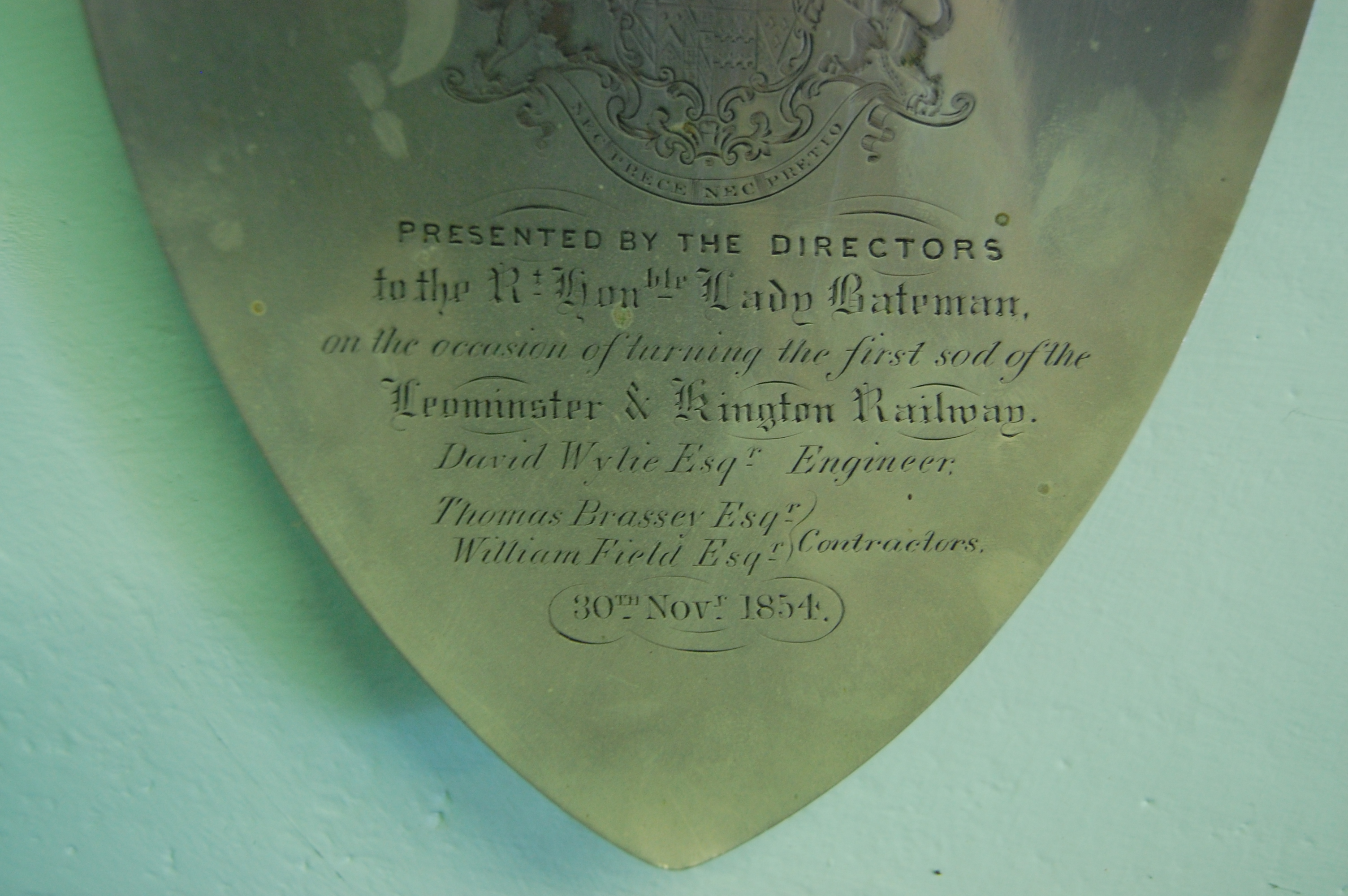
Commemorative shovel used at the turning of the first sod of the railway, now in Leominster Museum

Proposed in 1853, the company was formed by William Bateman-Hanbury, 2nd Baron Bateman of Shobdon Court. The Leominster and Kington Railway Act 1854 (17 & 18 Vict. c. cxliv) authorising the railway received royal assent, requiring construction of a broad gauge line in July 1854, subject to provision for a junction with the standard gauge Kington and Eardisley Railway be provided.

On 14 November 1854, the company agreed the offer of Thomas Brassey and William Field to construct the line for £70,000. Further, they would work from opening and pay the shareholders a 4% dividend per annum. Engineered by David Wylie of Shrewsbury, Lady Bateman cut the first sod at Kington, with a silver spade into a special built barrow that can be seen preserved today at the Leominster Museum. Section from the Leominster railway station of the Shrewsbury and Hereford Railway to Pembridge, opened for goods traffic on 18 October 1855, at a cost of £7,000 per mile.

But, with additional costs, the company was struggling, and in April 1856 Brassey and Field, who held £20,000 or one quarter of the company's stock, advanced the company £10,000 at 5%. The second section from Pembridge to Kington opened in August 1857. There were no tunnels or viaducts on the entire single-track line of 13 miles 25 chains (21.4 km) in length, which had cost £80,000 to construct.

Inspected by Colonel Yolland for the Board of Trade on 22 July 1857, a certificate authorising the opening was withheld because a level crossing had been built at Pembridge instead of the overbridge authorised by the Leominster and Kington Railway Act 1854.

== Operations ==
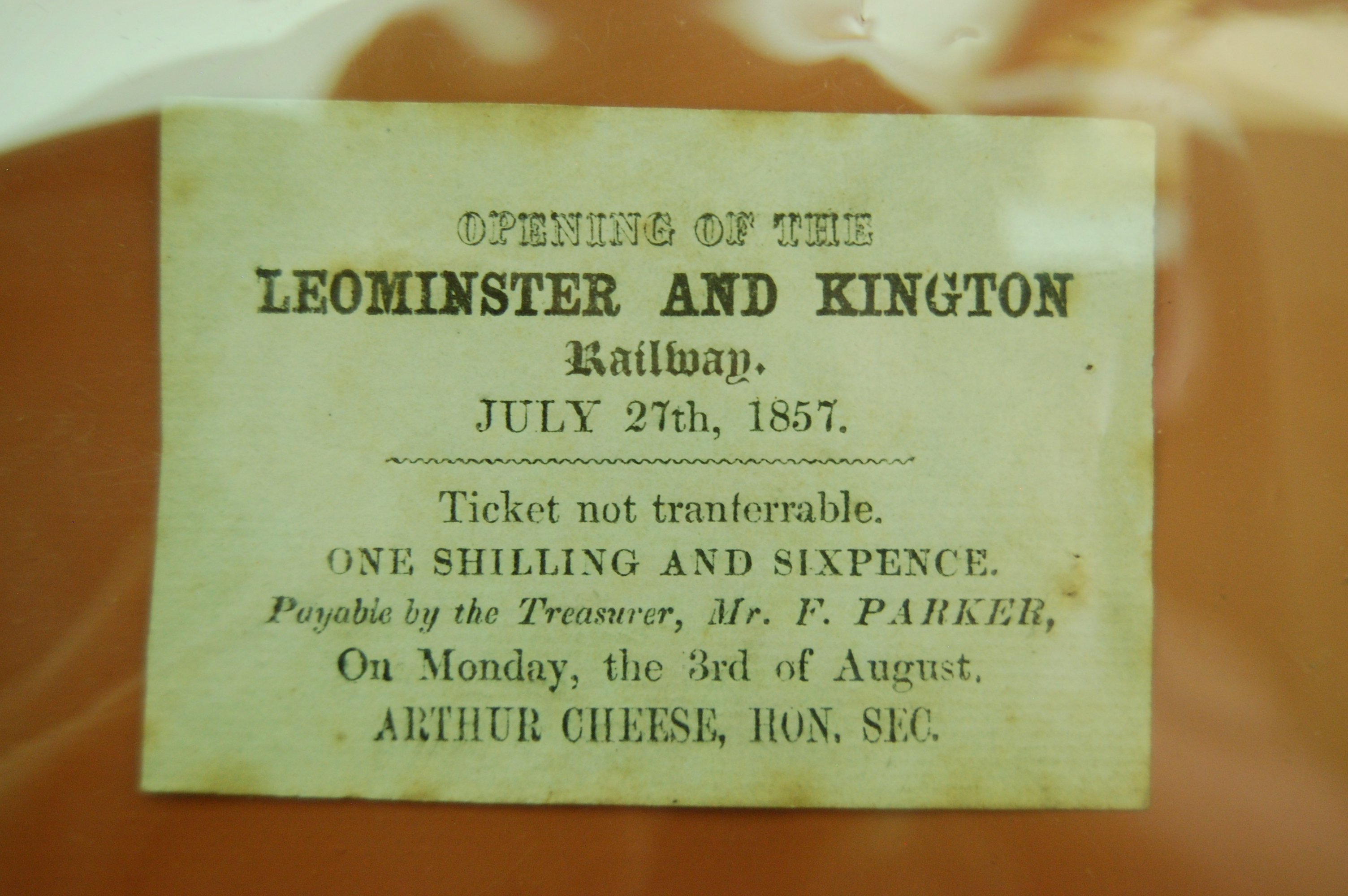
Ticket for the inaugural train, now in Leominster Museum

Eventually, it was agreed to open the line under a temporary order, subject to retrospective application and government approval of the level crossing. The line opened on Tuesday, 28 July 1857, with a train consisting of 32 coaches and two engines travelling from the joint GWR/LNWR station at Leominster to Kington, stopping briefly at all stations along the line. When they reached Kington, the directors retired to the Oxford Arms Hotel, where with 300 guests then Rear Admiral Sir Thomas Hastings CB presided over lunch. The return journey was completed with dinner for the same 300 guests at the Royal Oak Hotel, Leominster, presided over by Lord Bateman. Bateman remained chairman for 22 years, and had a private station built at Ox House.

In 1862, the line was leased to the West Midland Railway, which taken over by the Great Western Railway, amalgamated the line on 1 July 1898. This meant that by 1874 a journey from Kington to Leominster took 40 minutes, to Hereford 1 hour 20 minutes, and to Shrewsbury 3 hours and 30 minutes.

As the line was rural, and based in the Welsh Marches farm district, the main revenue was earned from transporting goods to the various markets. Sheep and cattle which had been driven to Kington on the various drovers trails, were now transported to their original destination of Hereford by train. Often on market days, seven or eight cattle trucks were attached to the Hereford-bound passenger service, specifically for bull transportation.

Titley Junction was the busiest intermediate station on the line with up to 30 trains a day passing through. It was the connection point for the L&KR with the Kington and Eardisley Railway south to the Hay Railway, and the L&KR's own line to Presteigne.

After completion of this extension, the K&ER extended north from Kington to a small station at New Radnor, in the hope of completing a cross-Wales mainline to Aberystwyth, but this never happened.

=== Kington and Presteigne Railway ===
The Kington and Presteigne Railway opened on 9 September 1875. Commencing at Titley Junction, it passed through Leen farm, to Staunton-on-Arrow, in front of the Rodd farm via Corton into Presteigne. By 1929 it was possible to join one of the three steam trains a day – each way – and make the 6 hour journey to London. The passenger service on this line ended in 1951, but a freight service continued to run every other day until the line was finally closed in 1964.

=== World War II ===
With need for new hospital capacity out of the reach of Nazi Luftwaffe bombers, the British government looked at sites in the Welsh Marches, which had the convenience of being accessible.

A hospital camp was built by the British Army at Hergest, which later acted as a clearing point for two general hospitals built by the US Army in 1943. The first dedicated hospital train arrived shortly after the Battle of Dunkirk in 1940. After the US Army Artillery arrived in late 1943, the camp had received 11 hospital trains for one hospital, carrying up to 300 patients per train. Between 4 January and 28 April 1945, the other hospital had received 10 trains and admitted 2,413 patients. All the hospital trains arrived from Southampton.

The camp was developed as RAF Shobdon, a glider training camp for both the Normandy and Arnhem campaigns.

== Closure ==
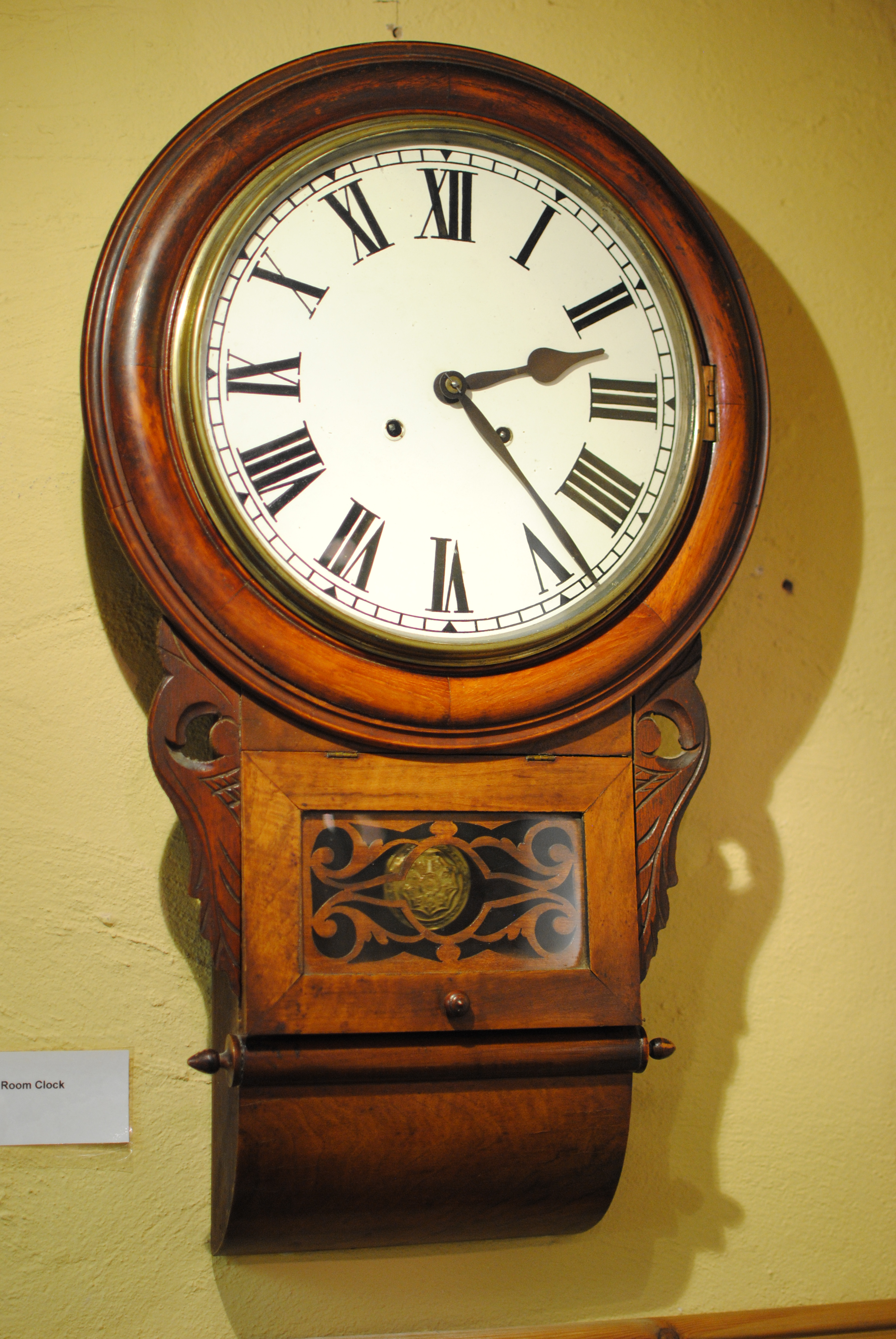
Kington railway station waiting room clock, now in Kington Museum

After the war, the line struggled to compete with local bus companies, who used cheaply sold former military buses. The proposal to close the line to New Radnor to passengers arose in 1950, and the passenger services on the westernmost portion of the line, from Kington to New Radnor, were suspended on 5 February 1951 (as were the passenger services from Titley to Presteigne), and a public notice issued in June 1951 that this was to become permanent, though both lines would continue to be open for freight. By September that year this was changed so that New Radnor station would be closed for freight as well, and in December 1951 it was announced that the track from Dolyhir to New Radnor was to be closed completely from 1 Jan 1952.

Passenger services were withdrawn between Leominster and Kington on 7 February 1955. The next step in the closure was the cessation of freight services between Dolyhir and Kington, which was announced in January 1958, and took effect on 9 June 1958.

Stations from Kington to Leominster remained open for freight traffic until 1964.

== Kingfisher Line ==
A 1-mile (1.6 km) section was reopened in 2005 at the site of the former Titley Junction station. Known as the Kingfisher Line, it is privately owned and is open to the public only by prior arrangement.
