= Up Nately =

Village and parish in Hampshire, England

Coordinates: 51.2607°N 1.0006°W

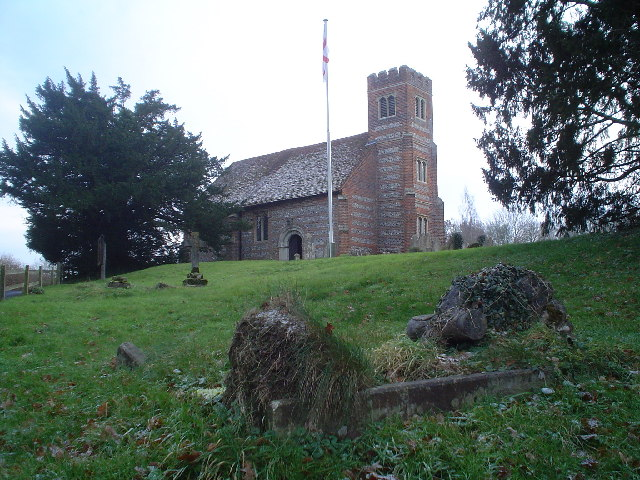
- St. Stephen's church

- Location within Hampshire
- Population: 307 (2021 Census)
- Civil parish: Mapledurwell and Up Nately
- District: Basingstoke and Deane
- Shire county: Hampshire
- Region: South East
- Country: England
- Sovereign state: United Kingdom
- Post town: BASINGSTOKE
- Postcode district: RG27
- Dialling code: 01256
- Police: Hampshire and Isle of Wight
- Fire: Hampshire and Isle of Wight
- Ambulance: South Central
- UK Parliament: North East Hampshire

Up Nately is a small village and former civil parish, now in the parish of Mapledurwell and Up Nately, in the Basingstoke and Deane district, in Hampshire, England, located five miles to the south east of Basingstoke.

Its nearest railway station, on the South West Main Line, is in Hook, three miles to the east of the village. The M3 motorway and A30 road run east-west just to the north of the village. An hourly No 13 bus service, operated by Stagecoach, runs on the A30 from Basingstoke to Hook and Alton, with stops at the crossroads with Blackstocks Lane and Crown Lane. The Greywell Road, which runs from the A30 junction at Hatch, about 2 miles to the west of the village, to Greywell to the east of the village, has bisected Up Nately since at least 1616 when it was recorded as the ‘Odiam (Odiham) Waye’.

The Basingstoke Canal runs through the village from the former Penny Bridge (on the Greywell Road) in the west, under Brick Kiln Bridge (Blackstocks Lane), Slades Bridge (Heather Lane) and Eastrop Bridge (Heather Row Lane), and, to the east of the village, through the collapsed Greywell Tunnel.

== History ==
Up Nately was originally part of the Great Manor of Mapledurwell, which the Domesday Book records as being held in 1086 by Hubert de Port as Chief Tenant and Lord and having 26 families.

When the Great Manor of Mapleduwell was broken up in the early 12th century, Up Nately was created as a separate estate and granted to the Cistercian Abbey of Tiron in France by Adam de Port, Lord of Mapledurwell. This grant was confirmed by Henry I and the estate was subsequently known as the Manor of Andwell. Tiron sent a colony of Benedictine monks to settle in its new estate, which became Andwell Priory.

As an alien priory with an allegiance to a foreign enemy, it was sequestered by Edward III. In 1391 the Manor of Andwell was sold by the Abbey of Tiron to William of Wykeham, Bishop of Winchester who then bestowed it on the newly founded Winchester College. The College retains ownership of land in the area today and remains of the priory can be seen today at Priory Farm in Andwell.

After the foundation of Andwell Priory, part of Up Nately (land now in Heather Row Lane) continued to be included in the Manor of Mapledurwell. In 1535 these lands were transferred to Corpus Christi College, Oxford (which had been granted the Manor of Mapledurwell in 1529 by William Frost of Avington). Like other collegiate institutions, Corpus Christi was legally unable to sell or grant away its lands and so continued to hold the estates intact until the mid 19th century. As a result, therefore, the pattern of roads, buildings, woodland, open fields and commons on College property changed little between 1616 and 1795. By the mid-19th century Winchester College owned 493 acres (199 hectares), Lord Dorchester held 164 acreas (66 hectares) and Corpus Christi College had 100 acreas (40 hectares) were the main landowners.

For many centuries farming was the dominant activity in the village. However, the opening of the Basingstoke Canal in 1794, which aimed to stimulate agricultural development in Hampshire, brought many jobs to local people.

There have been periods of industrial activity in the village such as cloth production in the 15th and 16th century and the 19th century expansion of a brickworks. There are a number of chalk and sand pits in fields surrounding the village, indicating historic quarrying activity.

In 1870–72, John Marius Wilson's Imperial Gazetteer of England and Wales described Up Nately as:

a parish in Basingstoke district Hants; 1 mile S of Nately-Scures, and 4 E by S of Basingstoke r. station. Post-town, Basingstoke. Acres, 1,013. Real property, £805. Pop., 99. Houses, 26. The living is a vicarage, annexed to the vicarage of Basing, in the diocese of Winchester.

=== Brickmaking ===
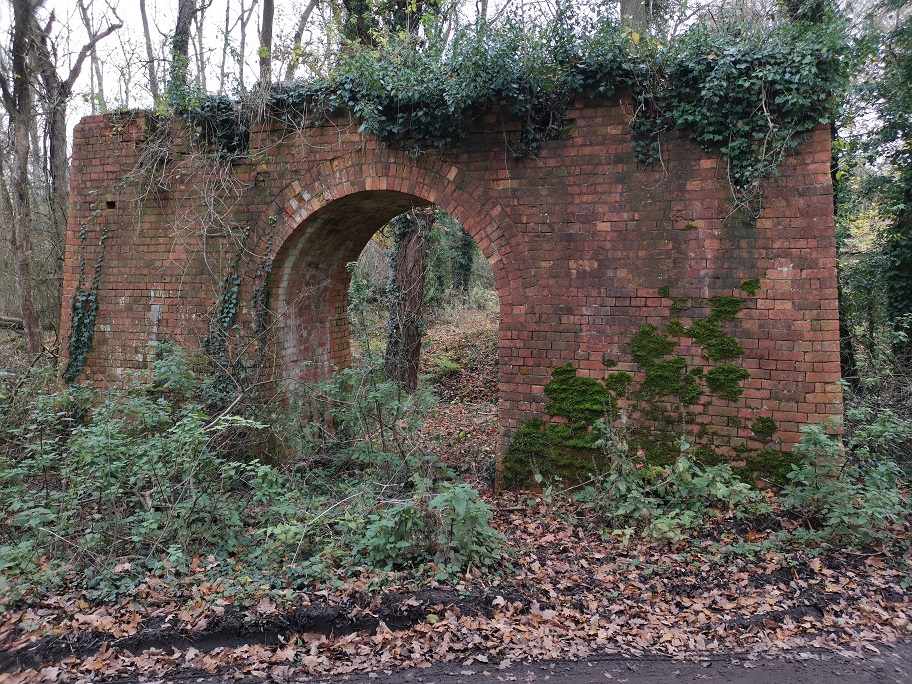
Arch from Up Nately brickworks

In 1897 Sir Frederick Seager Hunt, a Conservative Party politician and distiller, who two years earlier had bought the Basingstoke Canal, invested £20,000 to set up the Hampshire Brick and Tile Company on 32 acres of land in Up Nately. Hunt's aim was to revive trade in the upper reaches of the canal and in particular use the canal to supply bricks from the brickworks to replace the wooden huts at the Aldershot Garrison. Bricks from Up Nately were also supplied to local builders in towns along the Canal and accounted for half of the traffic in bricks using the canal. To fire the kiln, about fifty tons of coal per week were supplied by barge from Basingstoke.

However, the business did not prove to be viable. Sir Frederick sold his shares in the company and the company went into receivership by 1901. The site was used by the Nately Pottery Company from 1901 to 1908. Some of the brickworks buildings remained until the 1940s and the Kiln Chimney was demolished during the Second World War.

The arches of two kilns and some sheds from the brick works remain in Heather Lane, along with the Brickyard Arm which was a short 100 metre long branch off the main canal where bricks were loaded onto the barges. The name of Brick Kiln Bridge in the village is a legacy of the brickworks.

=== Demographics ===
Population
Year	Population	Male	Female
1871	99	n/a	n/a
1931	128	n/a	n/a
2001	440	n/a	n/a
2011	333	160	173
2021	307	153	154

== Governance ==
In 1880 Up Nately became a civil parish of 1,149 acres.

On 1 April 1932 Up Nately parish merged, along with its neighbouring parishes of Andwell and Mapledurwell to form the current civil parish of Mapledurwell and Up Nately The Parish Council now meet in the Mapledurwell and Up Nately Village Hall, located by the football pitch and tennis courts close to Mapledurwell on the Greywell Road.

Under the 1974 local government reorganisation, the Parish became part of Basingstoke and Deane Borough Council, a non-metropolitan district of Hampshire County Council. It is now part of the Basing and Upton Grey ward of the borough council.

Following the 2023 Periodic Review of Westminster constituencies, Up Nately became part of the North East Hampshire parliamentary constituency at the 2024 United Kingdom general election.

== Geology ==
Most of Up Nately is located on clay, silt and sand. However, the southern area of the village sits on chalk.

The eastern end of the village is liable to flooding.

== Conservation Area ==
The southern part of the village lies within the Up Nately Conservation Area. This was designated in 1981 by Basingstoke and Deane Borough Council in recognition of the special architectural and historic interest of the village.

== Local Nature Reserve ==
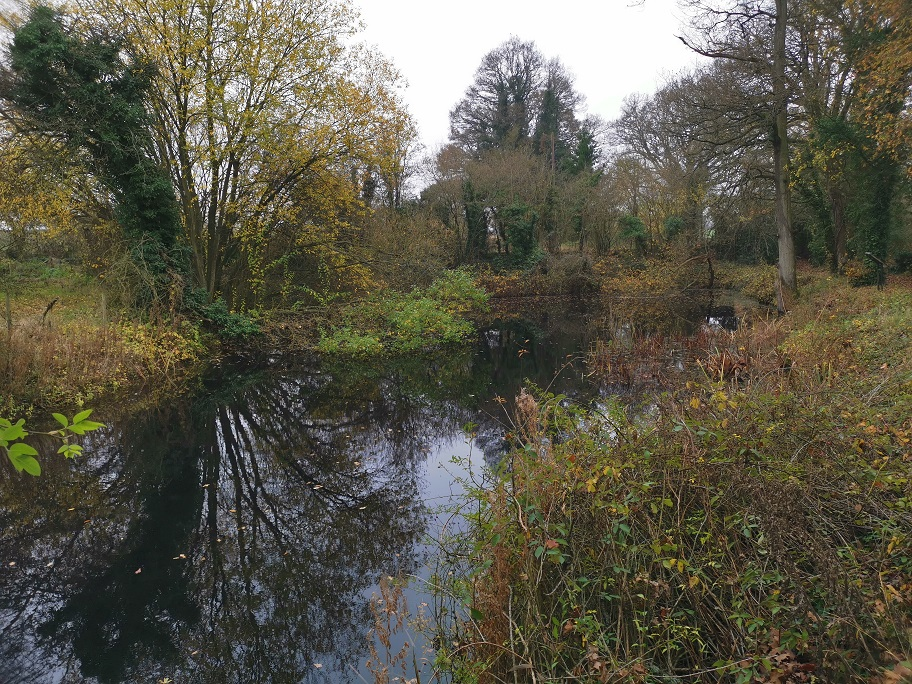
Up Nately Local Nature Reserve

Since the partial collapse of the Greywell Tunnel in the 1930s, the last five miles of the Basingstoke Canal from the tunnel to Basingstoke has remained isolated from the rest of the canal. Whilst most of this section has been drained, the part between the western end of the Greywell Tunnel and Penny Bridge in Up Nately still has water in it and has been preserved by the Basingstoke Canal Authority as the Up Nately Local Nature Reserve.

The Reserve, which has an area of 2.83 hectares (7.0 acres) and is part of Butter Wood Site of Special Scientific Interest, supports the following wildlife: coot, moorhen, mallard duck, little grebe, ruddy darter, water vole, ramsons and badgers. The Greywell Tunnel is an important hibernation site for bat species including the Pipistrelle, Natterer and Daubenton. The rare Barbastelle bat has also been recorded there.

Penny Bridge marks the start of a public footpath eastwards along the length of the Canal's former towpath. However, the Basingstoke Canal Society, working with local authorities, aims to open up a foot and cycle path to the west which would, as close as possible, follow the route of the canal from Penny Bridge to Basingstoke.

== St Stephen's Church ==
St Stephen's Church dates from around 1200, with 15th and 19th century alterations and is Grade II* listed.

The church includes a memorial to Alfred James Clark. Clark had joined the Army in 1914. In 1916, the hospital where he had been a patient was bombed. When erected, the memorial was unusual, being the second such one-man memorial in the UK.

The altar cloth has a mysterious inscription to the fallen of the Great War. It lists sixteen names of servicemen who are from different regiments, different parts of the country, and who died in different places. The association between them is unclear.

The churchyard contains the war graves of Frank Evans and Alan Sidney Woodbridge.
