= Adam de Port =

Adam de Port can refer to several Anglo-Norman noblemen:

- Adam de Port (d. c. 1133)
- Adam de Port (d. 1174)
- Adam de Port (courtier) (died c. 1213)
