= Huntington, Kington =

Village in Herefordshire, England

Coordinates: 52.177°N 3.098°W

Huntington
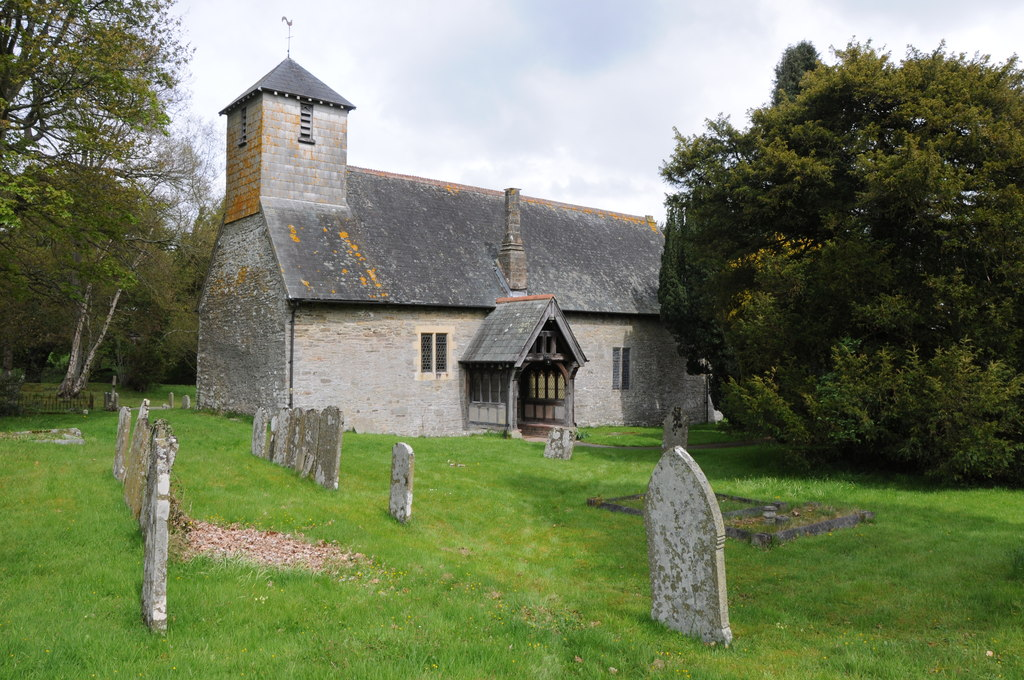

- Location within Herefordshire
- Population: 103 (2011 census)
- Civil parish: Huntington
- Unitary authority: County of Herefordshire
- Ceremonial county: Herefordshire
- Region: West Midlands
- Country: England
- Sovereign state: United Kingdom
- Police: West Mercia
- Fire: Hereford and Worcester
- Ambulance: West Midlands

Huntington is a village and civil parish in Herefordshire, England, and on the border with Wales. In 2011 the parish had a population of 103.

== History ==
Huntington was a medieval borough founded as a replacement to nearby Kington which had been destroyed in 1216.

Huntington was built as a new borough and was apparently in the first breath of life in 1228 when it was first mentioned. In 1230 Huntington passed to the Bohuns and in 1267 there was a survey carried out of Huntington (Huntiton) castle and borough with rents in Kington (Kinton) borough, Barton (Bauerton) and New Kington. New Kington was obviously the new town founded after the destruction of Kington and Kington Castle by King John in August 1216.

In 1298 it was recorded that Earl Humphrey of Hereford and Essex had 47 free tenants living in Huntington borough, some of them owing military service at Huntington Castle. However it is noticeable that there were already 59 free tenants recorded in Kington. The old borough, despite its destruction in 1216, was still surpassing the new borough created at Huntington. The account books of the 1370s show that Huntington was a thriving manorial centre. The account of the reeve, Roger Barton, states that the local tenants were liable to the lord of the manor of Huntington for ploughing, hoeing, mowing, muck spreading, tossing hay, reaping corn and oats and performing haulage. The revolt of Owain Glyndŵr some thirty years later seems to have destroyed what prosperity there was at Huntington, leaving what is now a decayed borough.
