= Roger de Port =

12th-century Anglo-Norman nobleman

Roger de Port was an Anglo-Norman nobleman and Baron of Kington.

Roger was the son of Adam de Port, who died around 1133. Through his possession of the manor of Kington in Herefordshire, he was considered by I. J. Sanders to have been the baron of Kington.

Roger gave to the abbeys of Tiron and Saint-Vigor-de-Cerisy in Normandy, and to Andwell Priory in England.

Roger was married to Sybil d'Aubigny, by whom he had three sons – Adam, Henry, and Hugh. Roger died before 1161. Roger was buried at Tiron.
