= Mapledurwell =

Village and parish in Hampshire, England

Coordinates: 51.26°N 1.01°W

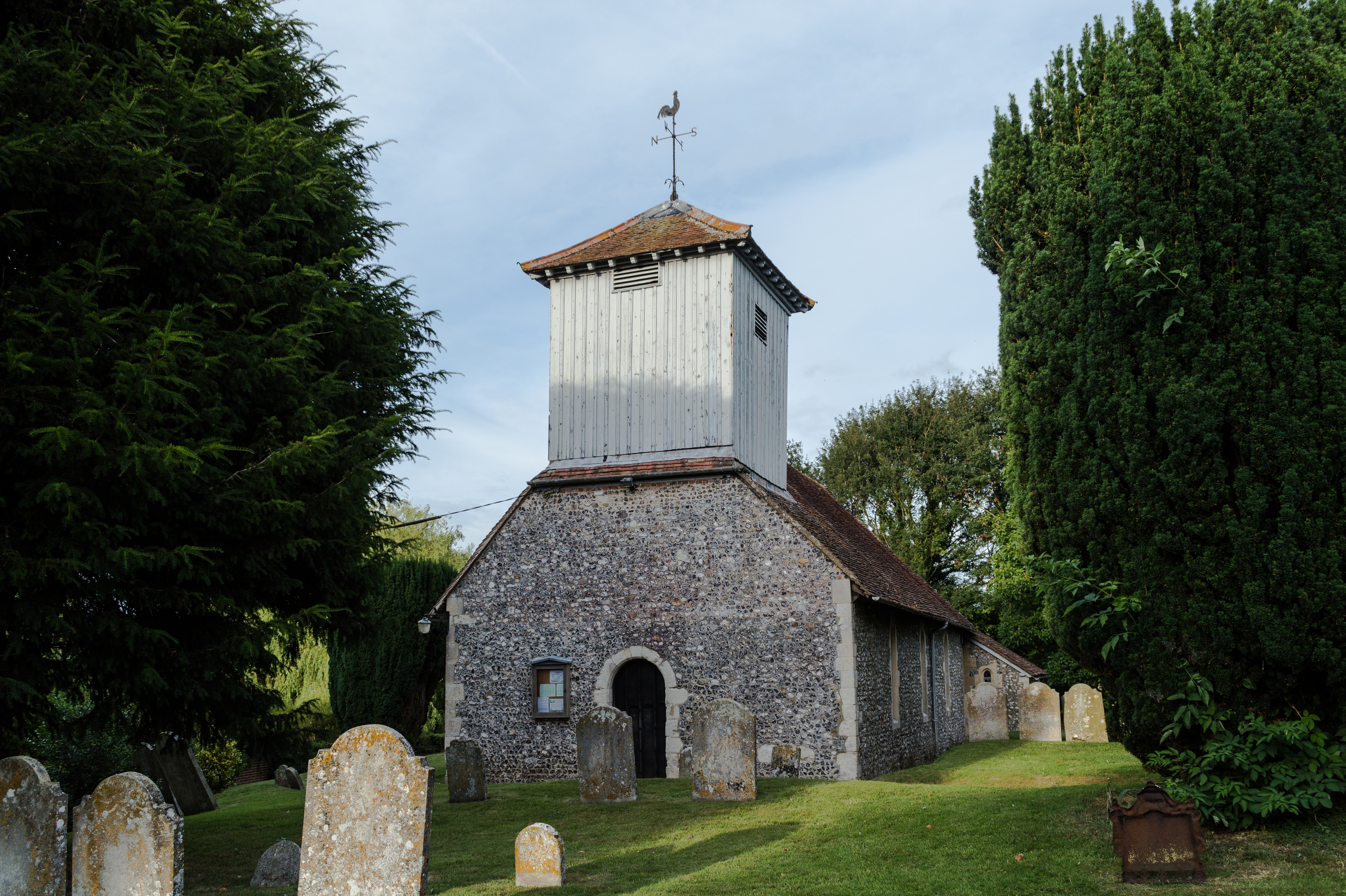
- St Mary's Church

- Location within Hampshire
- Population: 620 (2011 Census)
- OS grid reference: SU6952
- Civil parish: Mapledurwell and Up Nately
- District: Basingstoke and Deane
- Shire county: Hampshire
- Region: South East
- Country: England
- Sovereign state: United Kingdom
- Post town: Hook
- Postcode district: RG27
- Police: Hampshire and Isle of Wight
- Fire: Hampshire and Isle of Wight
- Ambulance: South Central

Mapledurwell is a village in the civil parish of Mapledurwell and Up Nately, in the Basingstoke and Deane district, in the county of Hampshire, England.

== History ==
The name Mapledurwell means 'maple tree spring'. Recorded in the Domesday Book, the land was held by Anschill for Edward the Confessor. From 1086, it became the sole Hampshire estate of Hugh de Port, covering the parishes of Newnham, Up Nately and Andwell. Forfeited by Adam de Port in 1172, after the King gave the manor to Alan Basset, it was transferred to Hugh de Despenser in 1306, who was hanged by Queen Isabel in 1326. Returned to the Despenser family in 1337, it remained in their possession for two centuries. In 1528, William Frost of Avington granted the manor to Corpus Christi College, Oxford, which remained the major land owner until 1839. This later long period of ownership resulted in the continuation of small tenant farm holdings, and hence the relatively late enclosure of the farmlands, and retention of an open land setting and older "twisty" road layout. The present area of allotment land was awarded to the village under and Enclosure act of June 1863. The opening of the Basingstoke Canal from 1778, which ran through the northern half of Up Nately, and the expansion of the nearby brickworks brought many industrial jobs to the area.

Rye Cottage built in 1487 was the last cruck built house in Hampshire.

== Governance ==
The village of Mapledurwell is part of the Basing ward of Basingstoke and Deane Borough Council. The borough council is a Non-metropolitan district council of Hampshire County Council.

It is located south east of Basingstoke. In 1931 the parish had a population of 182. On 1 April 1932 the parish was abolished to form "Mapledurwell & Up Nately".
