= Huntington Castle (disambiguation) =

Huntington Castle may refer to:

- Huntington Castle, a ruined 13th century castle in Herefordshire, England
- Huntington Castle, Clonegal, a 17th-century castle in County Carlow, Ireland

== See also ==
- Huntingdon Castle, a demolished 11th century castle in Cambridgeshire, England
