= Ed James (DJ) =

British DJ (born 1976)

Chairman of Birmingham Press Club
- In office 2012–Present
- Preceded by: John Lamb

Personal details
- Born: Edward Charles Stirk; 23 March 1976 (age 50) Knighton, Radnorshire, Wales
- Education: University of Newcastle
- Profession: DJ, broadcaster, journalist, columnist

Ed James (born Edward Charles Stirk 23 March 1976 in Knighton, Radnorshire) is a British disc jockey, broadcaster, journalist, author and live event host who presented Drive Time for Heart West Midlands in Birmingham alongside Gemma Hill. He moved to the Drive Time Show in 2019, after presenting the Breakfast Show since 2002 on Heart. He stayed with Heart until local and regional programming ended at the station. From April 22 2025, Ed now hosts the mid morning show on BBC Radio WM. He is also a columnist with the Birmingham Mail, Chairman of the Birmingham Press Club and is the co-founder of Lunar Agency.

== Career ==
He started on the radio aged twelve on BBC Radio York. While studying at Newcastle University, he presented at various radio stations across England before getting his first 'proper' job at a station in Manchester. James presented many shows before joining 100.7 Heart FM in Birmingham as Breakfast Show presenter in 2002 taking over from Daryl Denham. He worked alongside Hellon Wheels until 2006, and Sarah-Jane Mee from 2007 to 2008. Rachel New was his co-presenter from 2008 to 2016 after moving from neighbouring station Kerrang! 105.2. Since January 2017, his co-presenter has been Gemma Hill. In 2011 the Heart Breakfast Show won a Gold Sony Radio Award for Best Competition for its Beat The Star quiz that saw members of the public from around the Midlands competing alongside celebrities such as Gok Wan and Leona Lewis to answer general knowledge questions. On 17 April 2012 James celebrated ten years as the Heart Breakfast Show presenter with a champagne breakfast in the studio, while Rachel New presented him with a pet lamb as a gift. James presented his final breakfast show for Heart on 31 May 2019, following Global Radio's decision to introduce a national breakfast show from London. James then moved to Heart West Midlands's Drivetime show.

James presented ITV Central's The Biz, a weekly round-up of the latest goings-on in the Midlands for Films, Music and Gigs. In 2009 he became a columnist for the Birmingham Mail, writing about entertainment and showbiz. In April 2012 he was named as Chairman of Birmingham Press Club, narrowly beating former Central Tonight presenter Llewella Bailey to secure the position. Birmingham Press Club is the oldest organisation of its kind in the world.

James's mother is TV chef Anne Stirk.

In June 2018, James co-founded content marketing agency HDY Agency with marketeer Angel Gaskell. James is a qualified NLP practitioner and a member of Create Central. In 2020 he published a self-help book, Be More Kid, which is co-authored with Mark and Nicky Taylor.

In January 2025, it was announced that due to the scrapping of all local drivetime shows by Heart, James's and Gemma Hill's drivetime show on Heart West Midlands would be replaced in February 2025 by a national show broadcast across England. Their final show aired on Heart on Friday 21 February.

On 24 February 2025 it was announced that Ed James would join BBC Radio WM to present weekday mid-mornings from 22 April.

In November 2025, Ed took part in the BBC Children In Need challenge being tethered to Suzi Perry for a “three legged” walk of just over 25 miles. Along with other BBC Radio presenters they completed a total of 1,000 miles in aid of BBC Children In Need

Preceded by John Lamb	Chairman of Birmingham Press Club; 2012–present	Succeeded by Incumbent
