= Huntington Castle =

Castle in the United Kingdom

Coordinates: 52.17822°N 3.09971°W

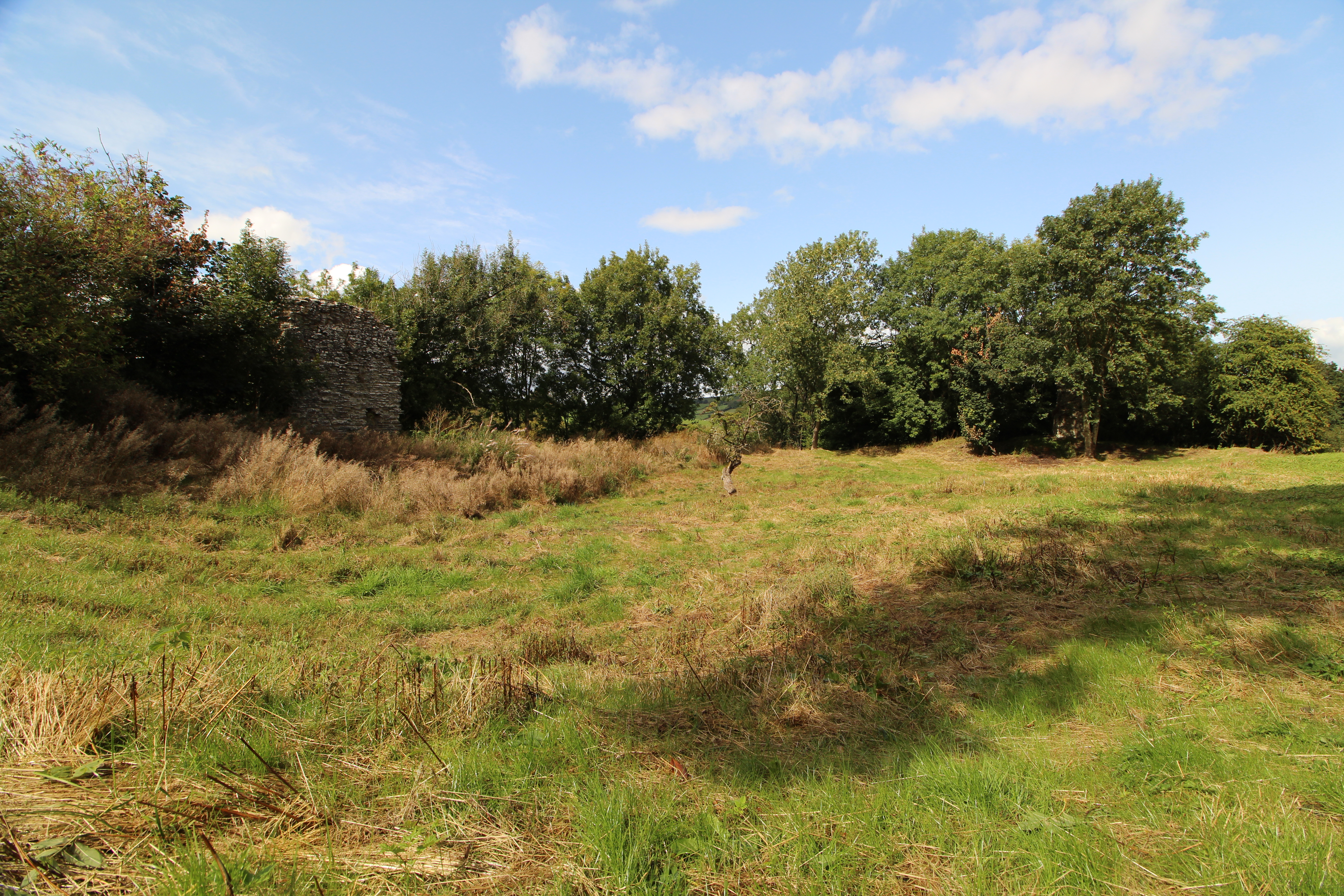
The remains of Huntington Castle

Huntington Castle was situated in the village of Huntington in Herefordshire, England, 2 1/2 miles south-west of Kington (grid reference SO249539).

== Site ==
The castle is sited on a commanding position on the modern day England Wales border in what was the Welsh Marches in Norman and medieval times. It overlooks the valley, protected by steep ravines to the north and west, and moated by the brook.

== History ==
It is likely that this castle was built as the successor of nearby Kington Castle which was probably destroyed in 1216.

The castle had been in the hands of the de Braose family but was seized in 1228 by Henry III following the death of Reginald de Braose. The castle must have been returned to the de Braose family because on the death of William de Braose it passed by marriage to the de Bohun family and saw some fighting during the Barons' War of the 1260s. It remained in this family until the death of its last male heir in 1372. The eldest daughter of the family Mary de Bohun married Henry, Earl of Derby who was elevated to the rank of Duke of Hereford by Richard II, his cousin. It remained his property until his own accession to the throne as Henry IV in 1399.

The castle then passed to Edmund Stafford, 5th Earl of Stafford. In 1403 he was killed at the Battle of Shrewsbury and possession passed to his widow, Anne, Countess of Stafford who then refortified the castle against Owain Glyndŵr. She appointed John Sment as Constable of the castle, better placed than her to expertly man its defences. Glyndwr's forces came upon the castle flush after their total victory at the Battle of Bryn Glas, they simply drove the cattle away, took flour from the local mill and then burned the mill to the ground.

It appears that the castle then went into decline. Peace was restored to the Welsh Marches during the reign of King Henry V with its focus on conflict abroad with France. By 1564 it was in the possession of the Crown but then passed through a succession of hands.

By the time of the English Civil War in 1642 it was a total ruin as a fortress. By 1670 the stone keep was still extant.

== Currently ==
Now only the earthworks and some portions of stonework remain. The site is overgrown and is listed on Historic England's Heritage at Risk Register as being in poor condition.
