= Church of St Mary, Kington =

Church of St Mary
- St. Mary the Virgin Church
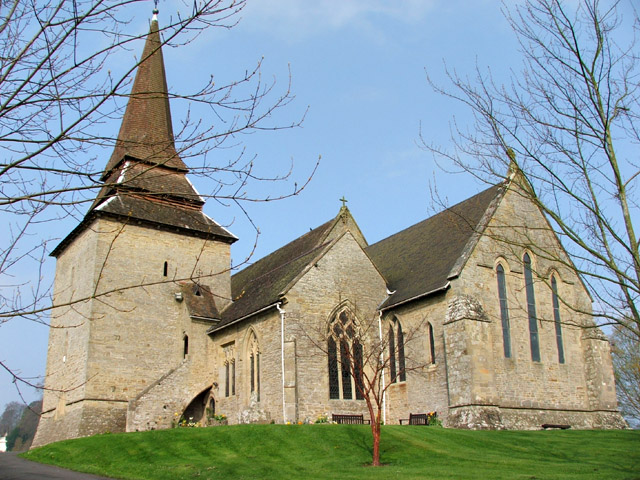
- The church in April 2005
- Church of St Mary
- 52.2045°N 3.03839°W
- Location: Church Road, Kington, Herefordshire
- Country: England
- Denomination: Church of England

History
- Status: Parish church

Architecture
- Functional status: Active
- Heritage designation: Grade I listed
- Designated: October 1953
- Years built: c. 1300

Administration
- Diocese: Hereford

The Church of St Mary, or St. Mary the Virgin Church, Kington, Herefordshire, England is a Grade I listed parish church.

The church was established c. 1300, but is much-altered. It has a 12th-century tower, originally free-standing, and included in the church when the latter was extended in the 13th century. A double broach spire was added in the 18th century. The tower houses a six-bell ring. Five were made by Rudhall of Gloucester between 1736 and 1739, including the tenor, which weighs 11 long cwt 23 lb (1,255 lb or 569 kg) and is in the key of F-sharp. The other bell was made by William Evans of Chepstow in 1764. The bells were refurbished in 1978 by the Whitechapel Bell Foundry. The church also has an organ made by J. W. Walker & Sons Ltd, installed in the North chancel chamber in 1883 and improved and refurbished by Henry Willis & Sons in 1959.

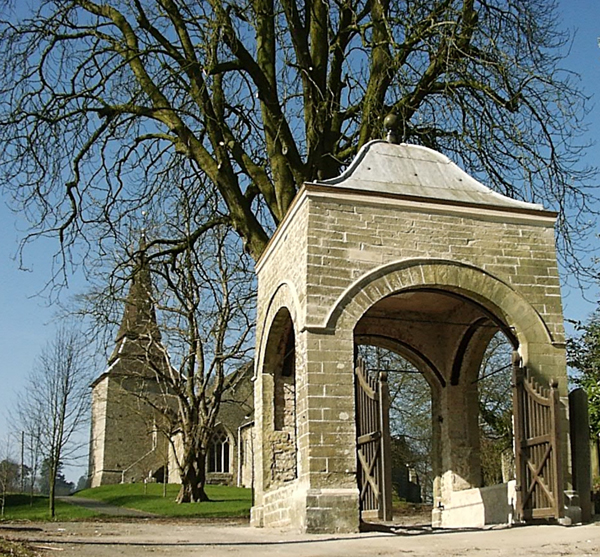
Lychgate

The lychgate is constructed from carved stone, dates from the 18th century, and has its own Grade II* listing. Its design is unusual, with a domed roof capped with a finial, and open arches set into each wall.

Inside the church is an alabaster monument to Sir Thomas Vaughan (died 1469 at the Battle of Edgecote Moor) and his wife Elen Gethin.

The church was Grade I listed in October 1953, giving it legal protection from unauthorised alteration or demolition. It is part of the Diocese of Hereford and is one of five (three in England, two in Wales) that are jointly administered as the "Kington Parishes"'.

== Nearby ==
Opposite the church is the original 17th-century building of Lady Hawkins' School, now in use as a private residence.
