= Kington Town Hall =

Municipal building in Kington, Herefordshire, England

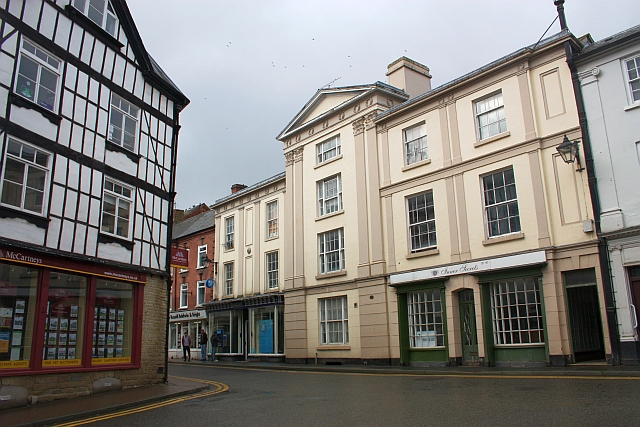
- The building in 2010 (No. 4 on the left, No. 3 in the centre and No. 2 on the right)

- Shown in Herefordshire
- 52.2038°N 3.0291°W
- Location: High Street, Kington

History
- Built: 1820

Site notes
- Architectural style: Neoclassical style

Listed Building – Grade II
- Official name: 2, High Street
- Designated: 6 August 1972
- Reference no.: 1208453

Listed Building – Grade II
- Official name: 7, 9 and 13, Lower Cross, 3, High Street
- Designated: 7 October 1953
- Reference no.: 1297574

Listed Building – Grade II
- Official name: 4, High Street
- Designated: 7 October 1953
- Reference no.: 1293133

Kington Town Hall is a former municipal building in the High Street in Kington, a town in Herefordshire in England. In the 1970s, the building was split into three units, with shops on the ground floor of two of the units, and the remainder of the complex converted for residential use. All three of the units are Grade II listed buildings.

== History ==
A market hall was commissioned by the lord of the manor, Philip Hollman, in the mid-17th century: it was a timber-framed building designed by John Abel, which was completed in 1654.

By the early 19th century, the market hall had become dilapidated: it was demolished, and a new town hall was commissioned by the then lord of the manor, Edmund Watkins Cheese. The new building was designed and built by Benjamin Wishlade in the neoclassical style at a cost of £500, using some materials from the old building, and was completed in 1820. It was originally tile-hung but, in 1841, on instructions from the then lord of the manor, James Thomas Woodhouse, the tiles were removed and replaced by slates.

The design of the complex involved an asymmetrical main frontage in three sections facing onto the High Street. The right-hand section of three bays incorporated elements of the earlier structure dating back at least to the 18th century. It was three storeys high. The first two bays were fenestrated by sash windows on all three floors and were flanked by Doric order pilasters on the upper floors. There was a doorway in the right-hand bay which was blind on the upper floors. The section was surmounted by an entablature and a cornice. The central section was four storeys high. It was fenestrated by sash windows on all four floors and was flanked by Corinthian order pilasters on the upper floors. The section was surmounted by an entablature and a pediment. The central and right-hand sections were given a stucco finish.

The left-hand section of two bays was originally constructed in a different style and was only integrated into the complex and given a stucco finish in the early 20th century. After the Kington local board and sanitary district authority was replaced by Kington Urban District Council in 1894, the new council used the town hall as its offices. The complex remained in that use throughout the first half of the 20th century, but it ceased to be the local seat of government when the council moved to Mill Street in around 1960.

In the 1970s, the complex was then deemed surplus to requirements, converted into three separate units, and was sold for alternative use. The right-hand section, designated No. 2, was given a shop front on the ground floor with residential accommodation above; the central section, designated No. 3, was converted for residential use, while the left-hand section, designated No. 4, became a branch of Barclays with residential accommodation above. The left-hand section then became a shop when Barclays closed its branch in 2016.
