= Knighton Community Centre =

Knighton Community Centre Canolfan Gymunedol Tref-y-Clawdd
- The Comm
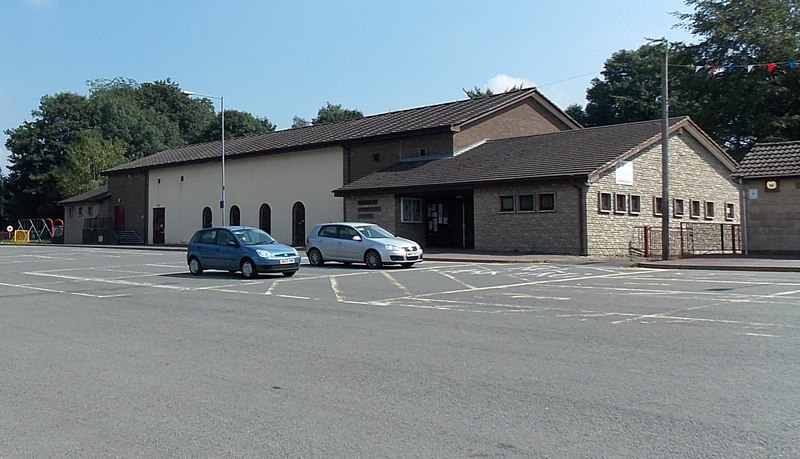
- Interactive map of Knighton Community Centre Canolfan Gymunedol Tref-y-Clawdd
- Location: Knighton, Powys, Wales
- Coordinates: 52°20′38″N 3°3′7″W
- Owner: Powys County Council
- Operator: Knighton and District Community Centre Committee
- Capacity: up to 650 maximum, 450 seated. The Hall also includes, the Reynolds Room with space for around 100 seated and 200 standing.
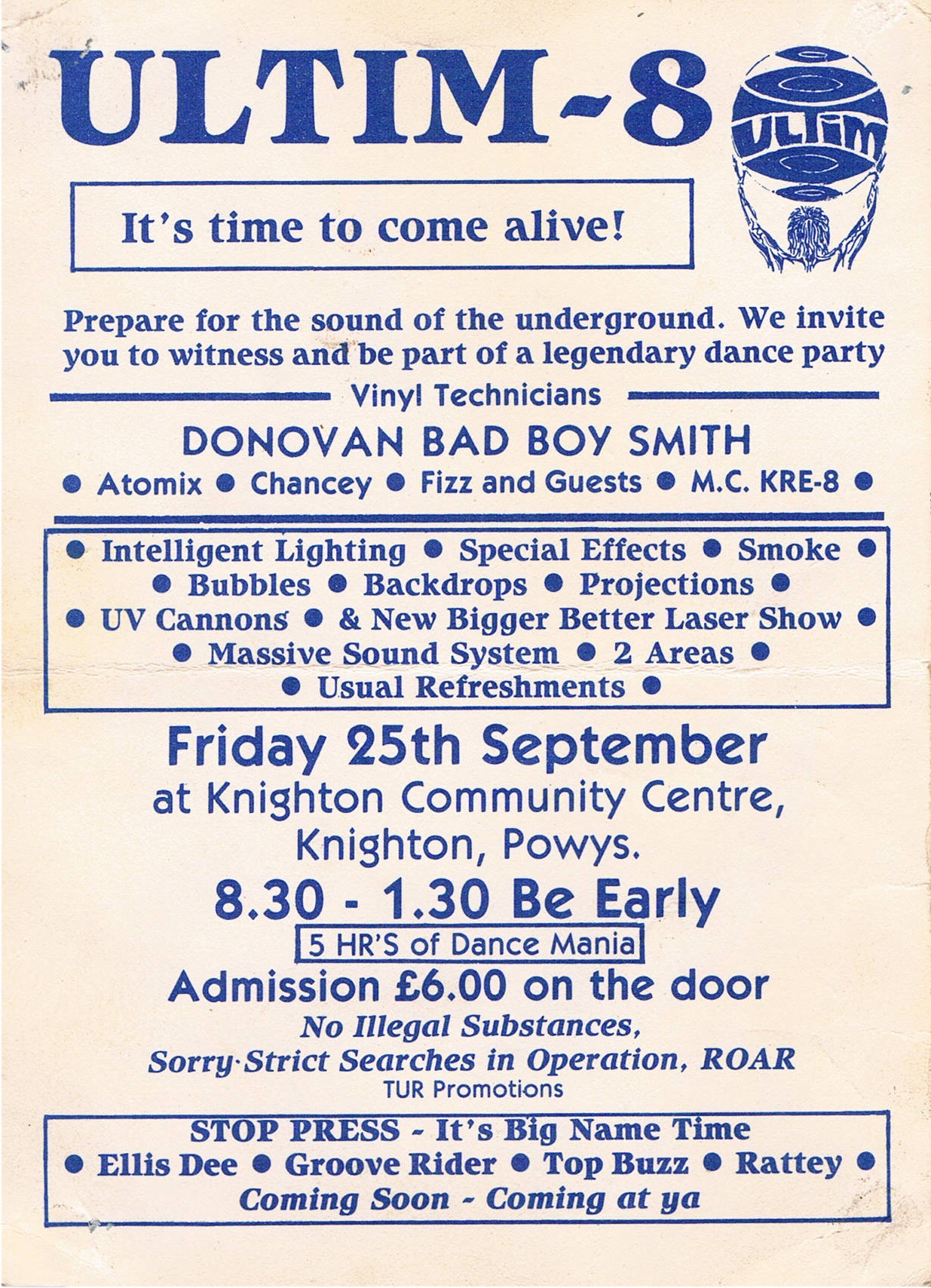
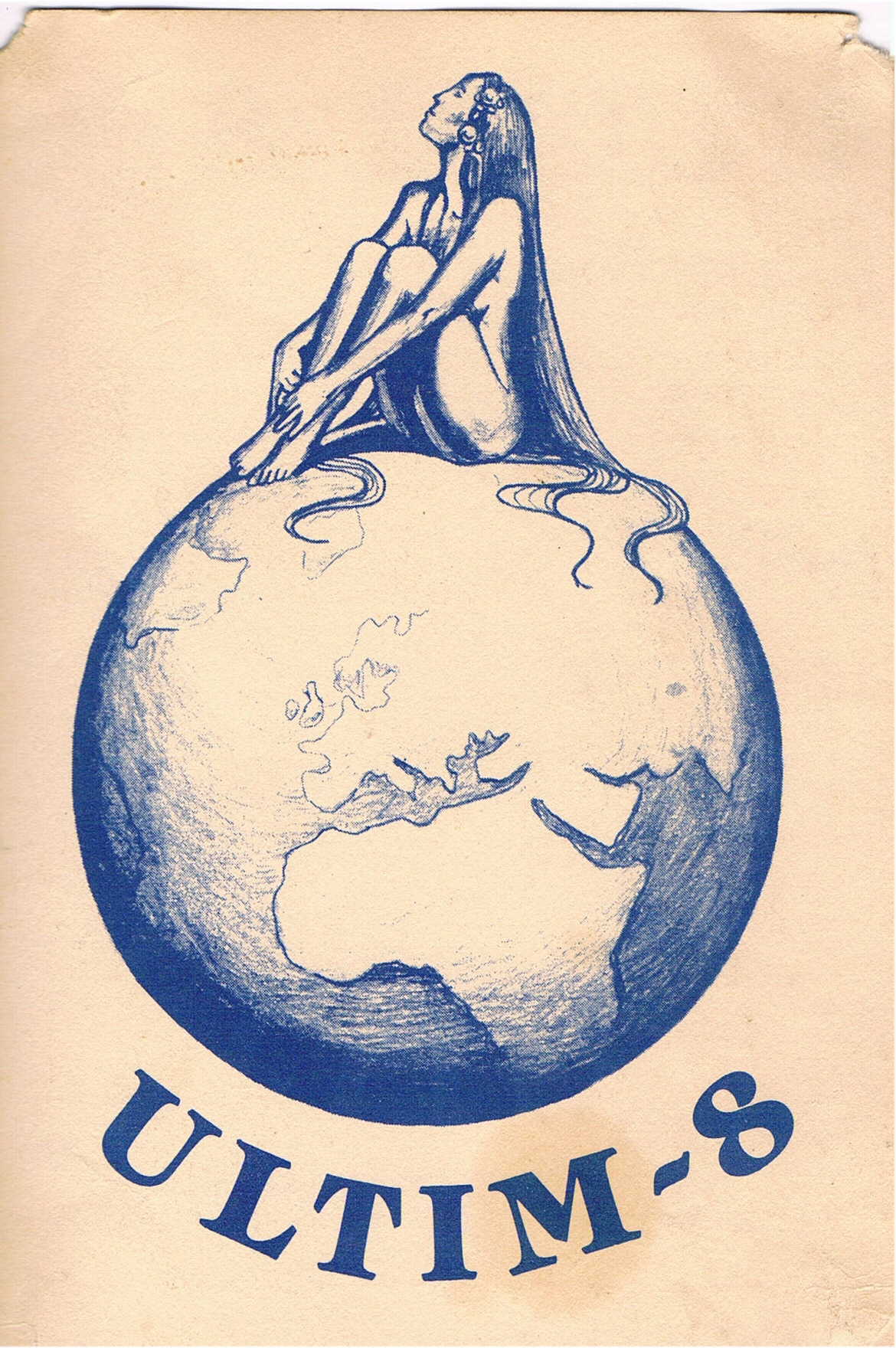
- Record attendance: 1,118 at Ultim-8 event 25 September 1992. Ultim8 rave flyer, Knighton, September 25th 1992-"Its time to come alive" (back) Ultim8 rave flyer, Knighton, September 25th 1992-"Its time to come alive" (front)

Construction
- Built: 1983 - 1984
- Opened: September 1984
- Renovated: September 2017
- Cost: £600,000

Website
- www.knightoncommunitycentre.com

Knighton Community Centre is a venue situated in the Powys border town of Knighton. Following an extensive refurbishment in 2017, it has become a hub for a wide range of services, including:

- District Library in partnership with Powys County Council
- Community Hub including Tuesday and Thursday Drop Ins
- Youth Work Project in partnership with Knighton Town Council
- Volunteer Centre in partnership with PAVO
- Family Centre and Stay and Play
- Cohesion and diversity work such as the film Knighton is my home
- Community Market and shopping events
- Digital Hub / Business Centre in partnership with Powys County Council
- Knighton Festival
- Live music and theatre

The Community Centre is a base for services such as the Knighton and Presteigne Leg Club, the Bracken Trust and the RNID (Cymru) Hearing Clinic. The Community Connector who works for Powys Association of Voluntary Organisations (PAVO) is also based here.

It offers facilities for hire and has a hall and stage, bar area, kitchen, small meeting room and medium sized meeting room and provides a base for Karate, Teme Spirits, Dance, Fitness, children's activities, weddings and private parties.
