= Up Nately LNR =

Land in Hampshire, England

Coordinates: 51.2652°N 0.9959°W

Up Nately
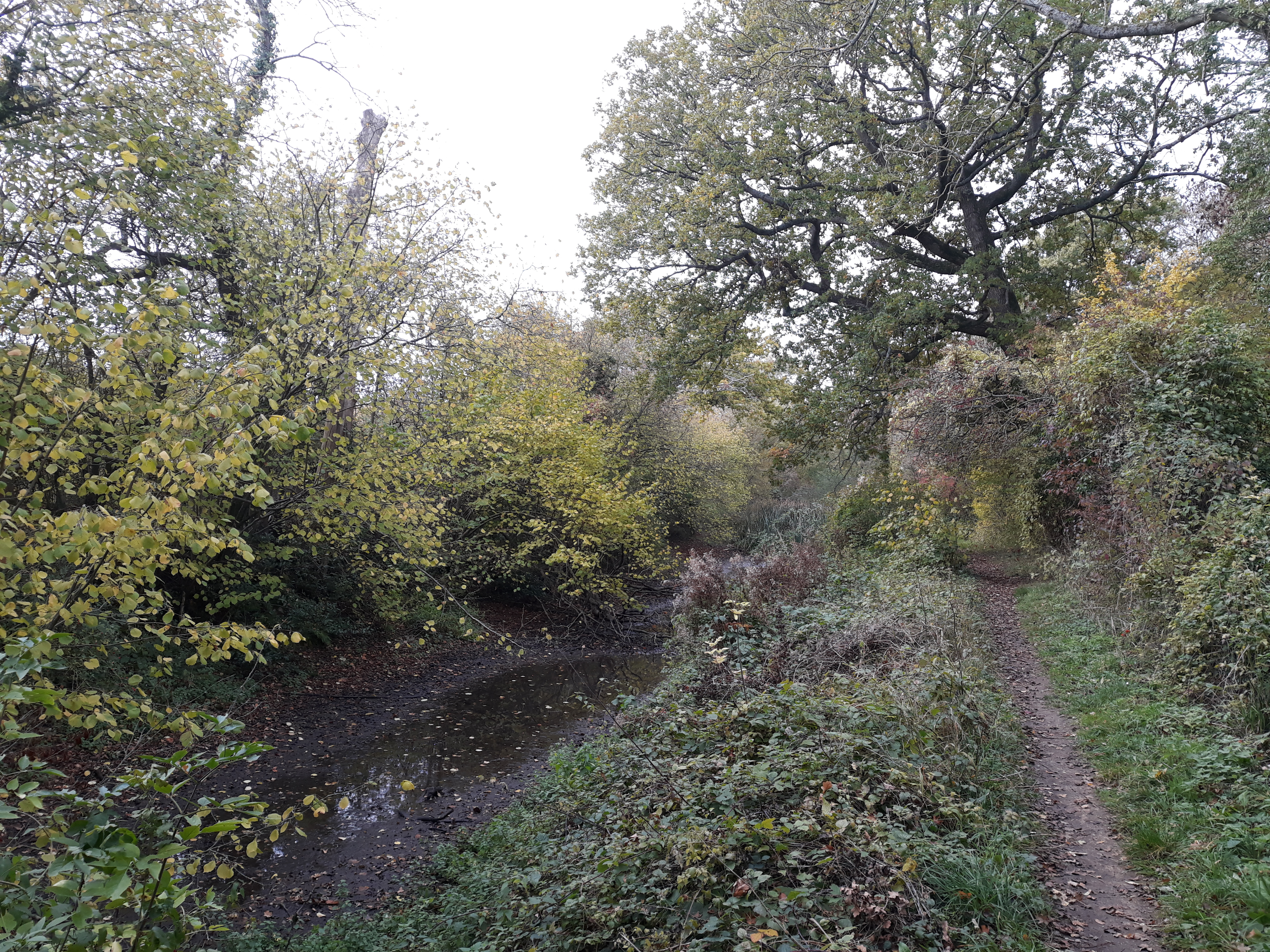
- Interactive map of Up Nately
- Type: Local Nature Reserve
- Location: Up Nately, Hampshire
- OS grid: SU 701 521
- Area: 2.8 hectares (6.9 acres)
- Manager: Basingstoke Canal Authority

Up Nately LNR is a 2.8-hectare (6.9-acre) local nature reserve in Up Nately in Hampshire. It is owned by Hampshire County Council and Surrey County Council and managed by the Basingstoke Canal Authority. It is part of Butter Wood, which is a Site of Special Scientific Interest.

This is a section of the Basingstoke Canal between Up Nately and the Greywell Tunnel. There is water in the canal and the towpath is a public footpath.
