= Andwell Priory =

Monastery in Hampshire, England

- Interactive map of Andwell Priory

Monastery information
- Full name: Priory of St. Mary at Andwell
- Order: Benedictine monks
- Established: early 12th century
- Mother house: Tiron
- Dedication: St. Mary
- Controlled churches: Stratton, Hinton

People
- Founder: Adam de Port of Mapledurwell

Site
- Location: Andwell, Hampshire, England
- Coordinates: 51°16′06″N 1°00′51″W
- Visible remains: some walls and doorways

Andwell Priory is an alien priory of Benedictine monks in Andwell, Hampshire, England.

This small priory was founded as a cell of the great Benedictine abbey of Tiron in France in the twelfth century by Adam de Port of nearby Mapledurwell. The grant of lands in Up Nately and other rents were confirmed by a charter of King Henry I of England.

William of Wykeham, Bishop of Winchester, purchased Andwell from the abbey of Tiron in the later part of the reign of Richard II and bestowed it and its lands on his newly-founded college at Winchester, to which it still belongs.

The premises were very small and not much remains. The north, west and east flint walls of the church survive, as do two modest 14th-century doorways that were part of the west range.
