= Adam de Port (courtier) =

English courtier

- Died: 1213?
- Occupation: Courtier

Adam de Port, or Adam de Porz, (died 1213?) was an English courtier.

== Biography ==
Port was the eldest son of John de Port and Maud, his wife. He was the grandson of Henry de Port, lord of Basing in Hampshire, and a justice itinerant in 1130. Henry founded the priory of West Sherborne in that county, a cell of St. Vigor's Abbey at Cerisy, and took his name from the Norman fief of his house in the Bessin. Adam reported to the exchequer in 1164, his father John being then alive, for about twenty-four knights' fees in Herefordshire (Liber Niger de Scaccario, i. 151), said to be the fief of Sibilla, daughter and heiress of Bernard of Neufmarché, and widow of Miles, earl of Hereford (Stapleton, Magni Rotuli Scaccarii Normanniæ, i. Observations clxi). During her lifetime he gave a charter to the priory of West Sherborne relating to an exchange (Monasticon, vi. 1014), and also in the reign of Henry II granted Littleton in Hampshire to the abbey of St. Peter, Gloucester, the manor being claimed by the convent (Historia S. Petri Gloucestriæ, ii. 388).

He was in 1172 accused of treason and of plotting the death of the king; he was summoned to appear before the king's court, disobeyed the summons, fled from England, and was outlawed (Gesta Henrici II, i. 35). During the barons' rebellion in 1174 he joined William, king of Scotland, with a body of knights, marched with him against Carlisle, shared in his defeat before Alnwick, and fled in company with Roger de Mowbray, probably taking refuge with him in Scotland (Jordan Fantosme, ll. 1340, 1360, 1846). He seems to have been in England in 1176, when he was fined three hundred marks for trespassing in the royal forests (Dugdale, Baronage). He made his peace with the king in 1180, submitting to a fine of a thousand marks, and receiving back his paternal lands, together with those that he held in Normandy in right of his second wife, Mabil; the lands that he had held in Herefordshire remained forfeited, and were described as ‘feodum Adæ de Port fugitivi;’ they appear to have passed to William de Braose in right of his mother Bertha, a daughter of Sibilla by Miles of Gloucester, for in 1194 he paid 22l. 13s. for Adam's fee. Of Adam's fine two hundred and fifty-one marks remained unpaid at the accession of Richard I (Pipe Roll, 1189–90, p. 199). He is said to have served the king in Normandy in 1194 (Dugdale, Baronage).

William Dugdale has a story that early in John's reign he was accused of causing the death of Henry II, and fled the country. This strange story, derived by Dugdale from a Cottonian manuscript, to which no reference is given, seems to have arisen from a misunderstanding of the passage relating his outlawry in 1172 (‘calumniatus de morte … regis;’ Gesta Henrici II which is in two Cottonian manuscripts), and from the description of the lands in Herefordshire that he had lost (see above). At the time in question, 1201, he still owed the same amount in respect of the fine of 1180 as in 1189, together with 8l. 10s. in respect of the scutage of Wales. In 1202 he fined ten marks and a palfrey in respect of a division of land in Hampshire with the abbot of Abingdon (Rotuli de Oblatis, p. 183). In 1203 he was twice employed to convey the king's prisoners from Normandy to England (Stapleton, u.s. Observations, vol. i. p. clxi, vol. ii. p. cxxvi). In 1208 he received from the king the custody of Sherborne Priory. He acted as a justiciar in 1208–9, fines being acknowledged before him at Carlisle. He was warden of Southampton Castle in 1213, and died in or about that year, when his eldest son had livery of his lands in Hampshire and Berkshire (Rotuli de Oblatis, p. 477). He is said to have rebuilt the church of Warnford, Hampshire (Wilks). Jordan Fantosme (u.s.) speaks of him as a valiant baron, one of the best warriors of his time.

His first wife is said by Stapleton (u.s., accepted by Bishop Stubbs in his edition of Gesta Henrici II, u.s., and by Foss, Judges of England, ii. 108) to have been Sibilla, widow of Miles, earl of Hereford, and this is borne out by Adam's charter to Sherborne Priory (u.s.), where, among his witnesses, is written ‘Sibilla comitissa uxore mea.’ Sibilla was married to Miles in 1121 (Round, Ancient Charters, p. 8), and it is extraordinary to find her married again to a husband who died 92 years after her first marriage, and about 108 after the latest date that can well be assigned to her own birth. There was an older Adam de Port, the brother of Henry de Port, and therefore great-uncle of this Adam, whose name occurs in several charters of the reign of Henry I (Historia S. Petri Gloucestriæ, i. 93, 236, ii. 220; M. Paris, vi., Additamenta, p. 38; Genealogist, new ser. iv. 135; Round, Geoffrey de Mandeville, p. 233); but the husband of Sibilla was, he himself states in the Sherborne charter, the grandson of Henry. By 1180 Adam married Mabil, daughter of Reginald d'Orval or Aurevalle, and his wife Muriel, daughter of Roger St. John, to whom Mabil appears eventually to have become heiress, and in her right he in that year held the honour of Lithaire and Orval in the vicomté of Coutances (Stapleton); by her he had issue, his son and heir being William, who assumed the name of St. John (Monasticon, u.s.). Later he married a sister of William de Braose (Dugdale, Baronage, p. 416). Dugdale and Nicolas make two Adams de Port, one of Basing and the other of Herefordshire.
