= Knighton, Powys =

Town on the Wales-England border

Knighton: Welsh: Tref-y-clawdd
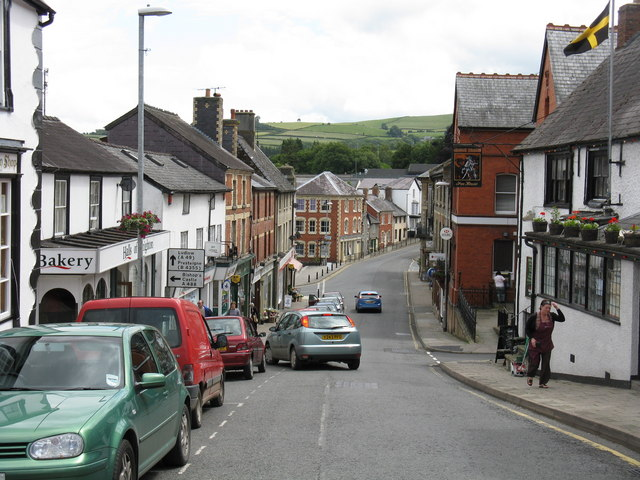
- Broad Street

- Location within Powys
- Population: 3,719 (2021)
- in Powys: 3,603
- in Shropshire: 116
- OS grid reference: SO286723
- Civil parish: Stowe
- Community: Knighton
- Principal area: Powys
- Unitary authority: Shropshire
- Preserved county: Powys
- Ceremonial county: Shropshire
- Region: West Midlands
- Country: Wales; England
- Sovereign state: United Kingdom
- Post town: Knighton
- Postcode district: LD7
- Dialling code: 01547
- Police: Dyfed-Powys
- Fire: Mid and West Wales
- Ambulance: Welsh
- West Midlands
- UK Parliament: Brecon, Radnor and Cwm Tawe; South Shropshire
- Senedd Cymru – Welsh Parliament: Brecon & Radnorshire
- List of places UK Wales Powys 52.344°N 3.050°W Community map: Map of the community in Powys, Wales

Knighton (Welsh: Tref-y-clawdd [trɛvəˈklauð] or Trefyclo) is a market town and community on the River Teme in Powys, Wales. It is located on the England–Wales border, and a small part of the town, including its railway station, lies over the border in the Shropshire parish of Stowe.

Originally an Anglo-Saxon settlement, Knighton is located on Offa's Dyke, the ancient earthwork that divided the two countries. It later became a Norman defensive border town. It was historically in Radnorshire.

== Toponymy ==
The Welsh name, Tref-y-clawdd, meaning and referring to "town on the dyke", was first recorded in 1262 and officially given to the town in 1971.

The name Knighton probably derives from the Old English cniht (a soldier, thane or freeman) and tūn (farm, settlement or homestead), and may have been founded through a grant of land to freemen.

== History ==
Knighton's earliest history is obscure, despite some local clues: Caer Caradoc (an Iron Age hill fort associated with Caradoc or Caractacus) is 2 miles (3 km) away, off the road to Clun. Watling Street, a Roman road, passes a few miles to the east at Leintwardine. Any settlements in the Knighton area would have belonged to the Iron Age kingdom of Cornovii, which coincided with the modern counties of Cheshire, Shropshire, north Staffordshire, North Herefordshire, and parts of Powys and Worcestershire.

Knighton includes a preserved section of Offa's Dyke. The parallel Wat's Dyke a few miles to the east, runs north and south along the English/Welsh border from Basingwerk near Holywell to Oswestry. Dykes aside, two Norman castles, earthen mottes, likely to be from 12th and 13th centuries, are the oldest surviving structures in modern Knighton. There is disagreement about the chronology of the two castles, although the earlier is likely to be the one above the town in Castle Road, with its more defensible position, wider panorama and clear evidence of a bailey. The first castle built here would also have overlooked the market place in Market Street and the town planned between Broad Street and St Edwards Church.

The town became a borough in 1203, with a charter permitting a weekly market and annual fair. The presence of two castles within a comparatively small town suggests that one (the earlier motte and bailey sited atop the town) went out of use before the establishment of the second (the motte with no bailey at Bryn y Castell). As Knighton Castle was captured and destroyed by Llewelyn ap Gruffyd in 1262, it seems likely that the second, later castle at Bryn y Castell was undertaken after that and was likely sited on lower ground so as to guard the crossing point of the River Teme. Bryn y Castell, as the one surviving castle in Knighton by then, was besieged by Owain Glyndŵr in 1402 and destroyed along with much of the town. The major battle of the rebellion was fought in the same year at Pilleth (Welsh: Bryn Glas) 3 miles (5 km), south of the town. Though documents pertaining to the defence of Knighton during the Glyndwr rebellion state that Knighton had stout and defensible walls, no historical, archaeological or topographic evidence for a town wall, even of timber, has been found. So it is thought more likely that the statement referred to the castle walls, rather than the town.

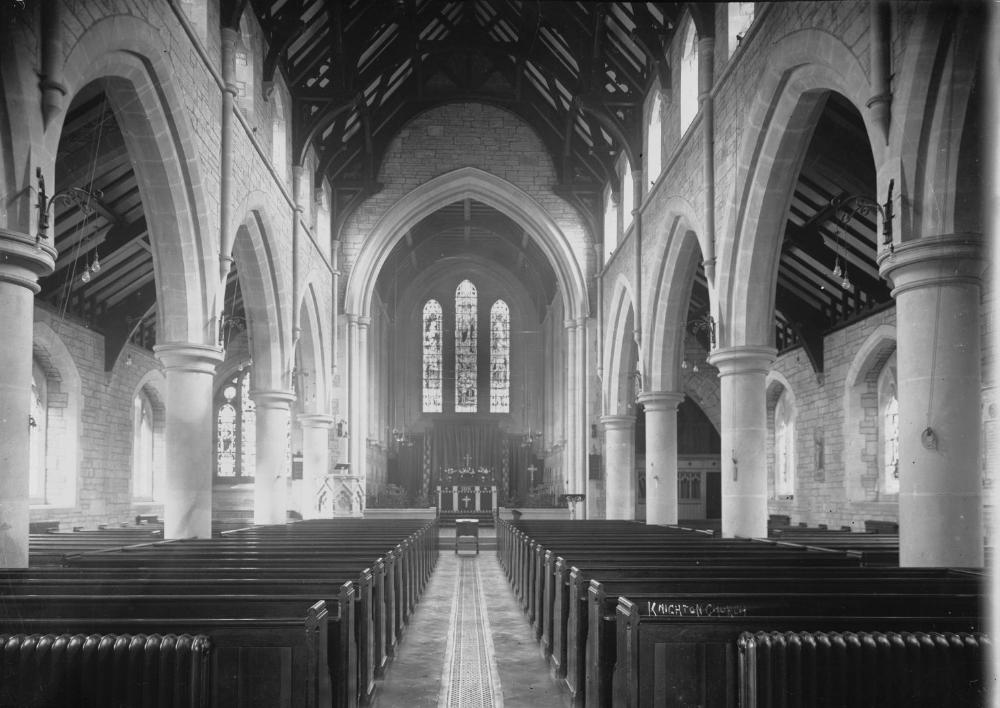
Knighton Church, 1910s

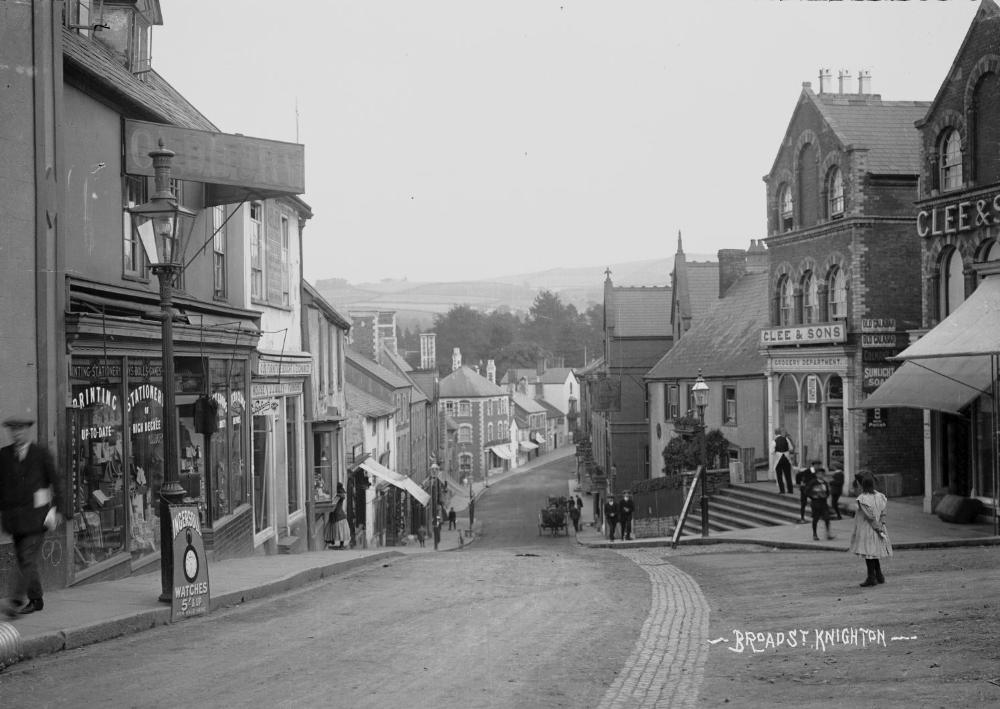
Broad St. Knighton, 1910s

The town church dates from the 11th century, but much of it was rebuilt in the 19th century. It is one of only two in Wales dedicated to St Edward, patron saint of England before St George was chosen. This English dedication is a symptom of the dual English/Welsh nature of the town, which was not legally resolved until 1535, when Knighton was finally confirmed as part of Wales by the Acts of Union. Knighton also has a Baptist chapel and a small Catholic church.

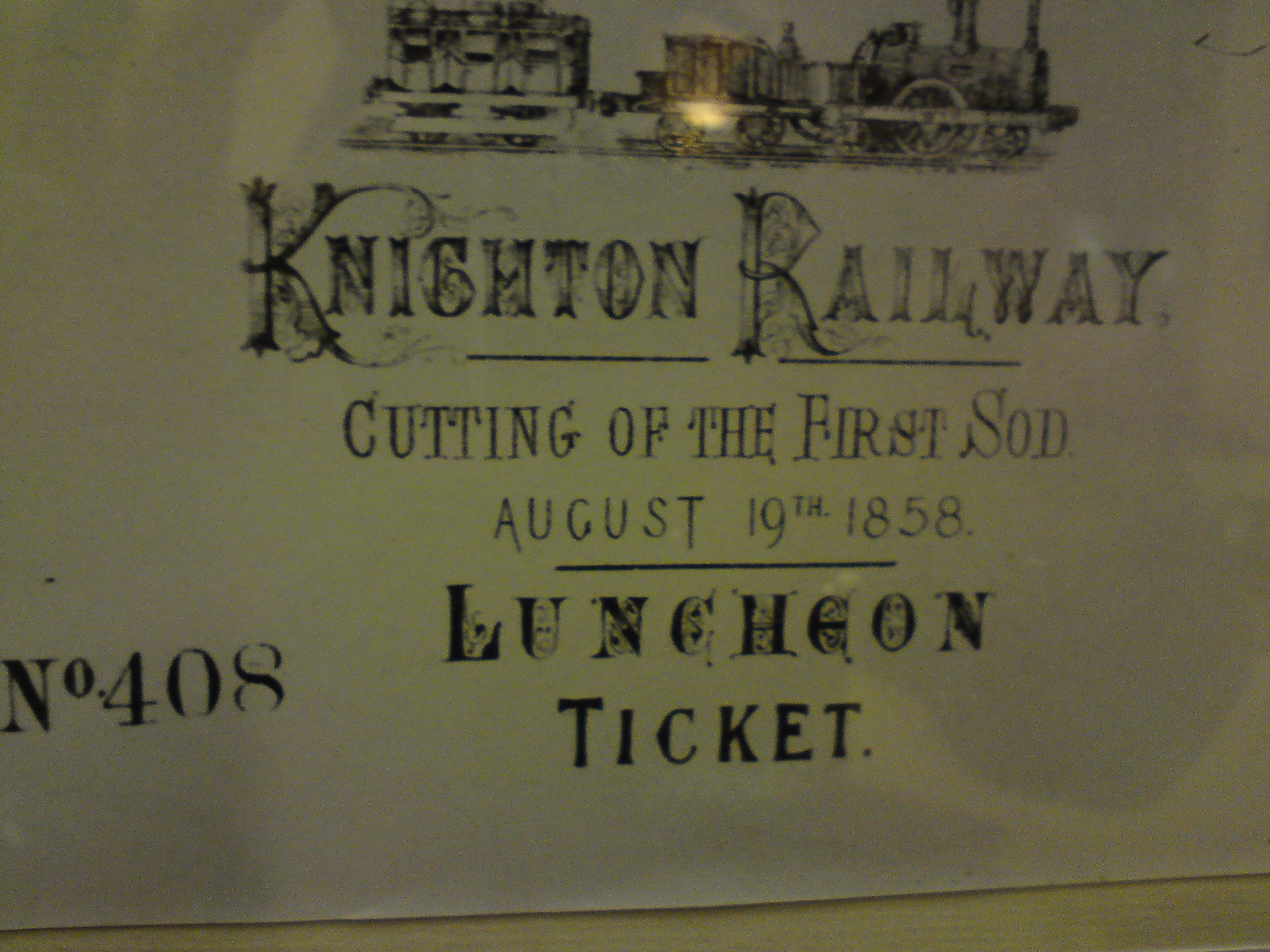
Arrival of the railway

Knighton first prospered as a centre of the wool trade in the 15th century and was later an important point on the two drover routes from Montgomery to Hereford, and from London to Aberystwyth. Otherwise, Knighton was remote from centres of commerce.

It seemed likely that the railways would also fail to reach the town; the 1840s and 1850s saw rapid railway building right across Great Britain, but Radnorshire had a small population and little industry. Construction of a railway was made economically just viable by an entrepreneurial drive to connect the Mumbles and Milford Haven with the cities and factories of the industrial Midlands. The Knighton Railway Company was formed by local landowners and businessmen to build a line from Craven Arms to the town. Work began in August 1858 and the line reached Knighton in March 1861. The station itself ensued in 1865.

To mark the accession of Queen Elizabeth II in 1953, the initials "ER" were planted in deciduous trees in an evergreen forest on a hill to the north of the town.

In August 1970, Knighton hosted a rock festival with bands such as The Move, along with Pete Brown & Piblokto, Roger Bunn, Forever More, Clark-Hutchinson, James Litherland's Brotherhood (James was originally part of Colosseum) and Killing Floor. The compères were radio DJ Pete Drummond and local resident and bluesman Alexis Korner, who also performed.

== Governance ==
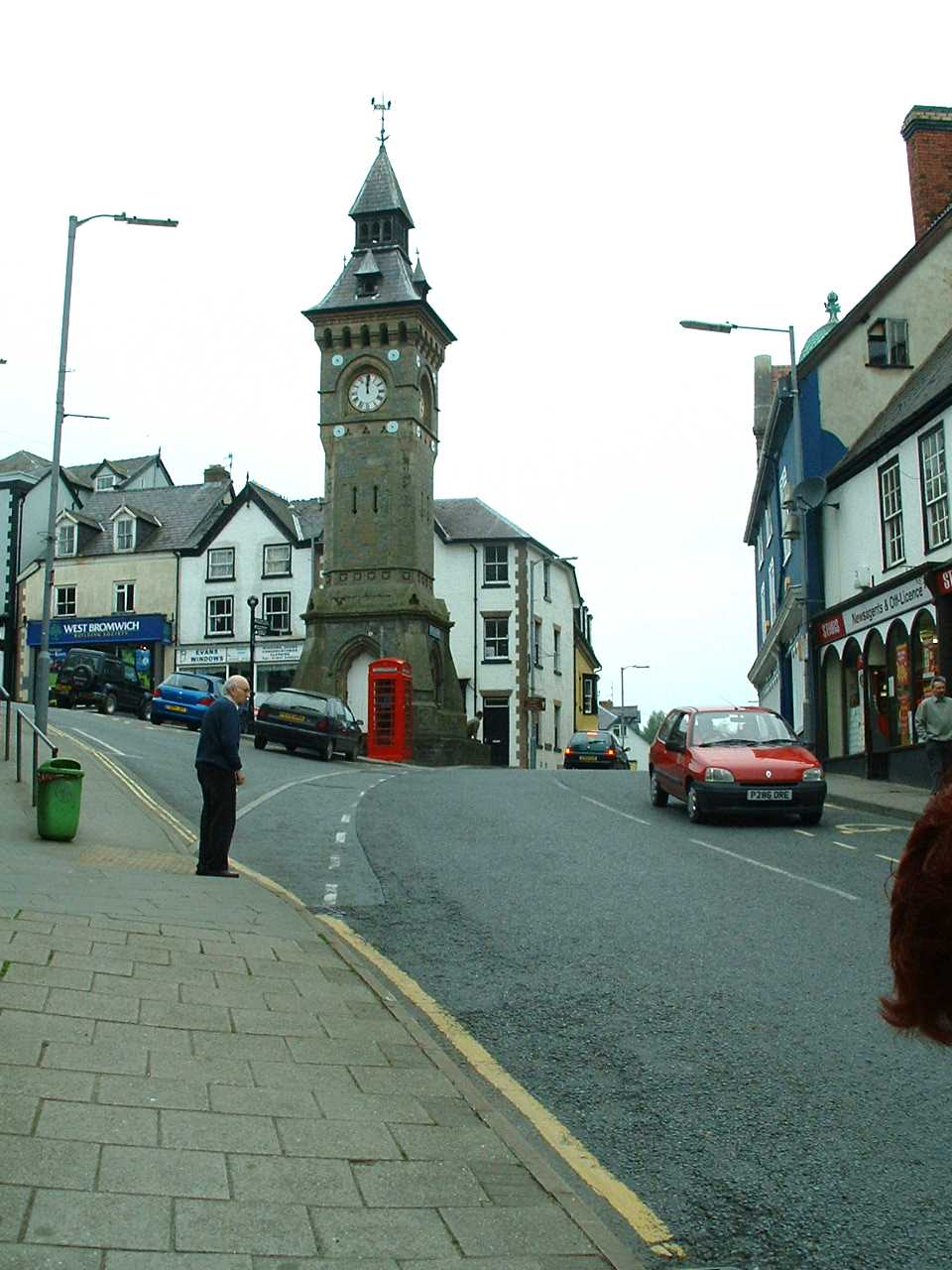
Clock Tower

=== Politics ===
After the Acts of Union, Knighton belonged for nearly 450 years to the traditional County of Radnorshire. This, like several other counties, ceased to exist in 1974, being merged into the county of Powys.

The town council of 13 councillors elects once a year a largely ceremonial mayor.

Real municipal authority lies with Powys County Council. Knighton electoral ward was represented by two county councillors on Powys County Council until 1999, then only one. These have been Independent councillors or Liberal Democrats. Since May 2021, Knighton has joined with Beguildy to return 2 County Councillors, and it has been represented by the Independent Ange Williams and Liberal Democrat Corinna Kenyon-Wade.

Above the county council, the Senedd Cymru – Welsh Parliament forms the next tier of government.

Knighton falls within the Westminster constituency of Brecon, Radnor and Cwm Tawe.

Knighton belongs to the Senedd constituency of Brecon and Radnorshire, represented by James Evans a Conservative.

==== English part ====
The few roads and houses that lie across the border in England belong to the civil parish of Stowe, Shropshire. They form part of the Westminster constituency of South Shropshire.

=== Public services ===
Knighton has a fire station served by a part-time crew and part of the Mid and West Wales Fire and Rescue Service. The local police force is Dyfed-Powys Police, but the town has no police station.

Knighton Hospital in Ffrydd Road occupies the site of the old workhouse and uses some of its former buildings. It has maternity facilities, but no accident and emergency capability. Attached to Knighton Hospital is Knighton Ambulance Station, operated by the Welsh Ambulance Service. Primary care is provided by a GP practice and a Boots pharmacy.
Social housing is largely provided by two housing associations, one in Wales (Mid Wales Housing Association) and another in England (South Shropshire Housing Association).

=== Twinning ===
Knighton has been twinned with the small Breton town of Varades since August 2009.

== Demography ==
Religion	%
Buddhist	0.13
Christian	74.33
Hindu	0.00
Jewish	0.00
Muslim	0.13
No religion	16.14
Other	0.32
Sikh	0.00
Not stated	8.91

Age	Percentage
0–15	16.6
16+17	2.5
18–44	27.8
45–59	20.6
60–84	29.7
85+	2.9

Year	Population:
1841	1,404
1851	1,566
1861	1,853
1871	1,946
1881	1,905
1891	1,813
1901	2,139
2001	3,043
2005	3,336

Knighton Compared
2011 UK Census	Knighton	Powys	Wales
Total population	3,007	132,976	3,063,456,
Speaks and or reads Welsh	12.3%	28.0%	26.7%
Non-white	0.7%	0.8%	4.4%
Born in Wales	32.9%	49.8%	72.7%
Welsh ethnicity (self-declared)	28.2%	43.3%	57.5%
Welsh or Welsh and British ethnicity	31.5%	48.5%	64.6%
Unemployed	2.88%	4.12%	3.30%
No qualifications	33.63%	22.60%	23.61%

Statistics confirm Knighton's slow growth since the early 19th century. The population was estimated in 2019 at 2,912. The 2001 Census provides a snapshot of Knighton today and allows comparisons with the county and Wales as a whole. Knightonians are less likely to describe their identity as Welsh than inhabitants of other parts of Wales. It is also more homogenous and enjoys higher employment rates.

== Culture ==
=== Attractions ===
The town includes visible remains of two early castle mottes, one at Bryn-y-Castell and the other hidden behind the fire station and in a private garden. The Clock Tower was built in 1872 and is similar to those in Rhayader, Hay on Wye and Machynlleth.

On the first Saturday in April the town normally holds an annual Carnival and Show, which attracts visitors from around the world, though it did not take place in 2020 due to COVID-19. Its two parades, one at midday and another around 8 pm, consist of various themed carnival floats with people in fancy dress. The show takes place at the town's showground at Bryn-y-Castell, which is also home to Knighton Town F.C., Knighton Cricket Club and Knighton Hockey Club.

Just outside Knighton and visible for many miles is an observatory with a telescope, Europe's largest camera obscura, and a planetarium. This is part of the Spaceguard UK project, which searches for asteroids.

Knighton Community Centre is the town's largest venue for discos, performances, wrestling, bands, artists, and local clubs and organisations. Knighton includes two National Trails: Glyndŵr's Way and Offa's Dyke Path. The Offa's Dyke Association has a visitors' centre in the town alongside the site of the ceremony at which John Hunt, Baron Hunt of Llanfair Waterdine inaugurated the long-distance footpath system in 1971. Much of the route is a bridle path as well as a footpath, with even some vehicles allowed to use it. It is a walk recommended by the Daily Telegraph. The Jack Mytton Way passes nearby and another Wat's Dyke Way was proposed.

=== Cultural references ===
Knighton has featured in two major films. Gone to Earth, released in 1950 and directed by Michael Powell and Emeric Pressburger, used the nearby location of Pentre, New Invention. Second Best, released in 1994 and starring William Hurt, was filmed partly in Knighton.

The Oscar-winning actor Julie Christie lived nearby in the 1970s. The actor Richard Thorp, famous as the tubby former publican Alan Turner in Emmerdale, lived at Skyborry.

Knighton is mentioned in A Shropshire Lad by A. E. Housman:

We still had sorrows to lighten,

One could not always be glad,
And lads knew trouble at Knighton,

When I was a Knighton lad.

Bruce Chatwin was inspired to write a novel, On the Black Hill, by a hill of that name just 2 miles (3 km) north of the town, on the road to Clun. He stayed nearby in Purslow with friends in the 1970s.

On a less literary note, Guy N. Smith's book Knighton Vampires is based locally.
The musician, songwriter, historian, and broadcaster Alexis Korner also lived nearby in the 1970s.

=== Sport ===
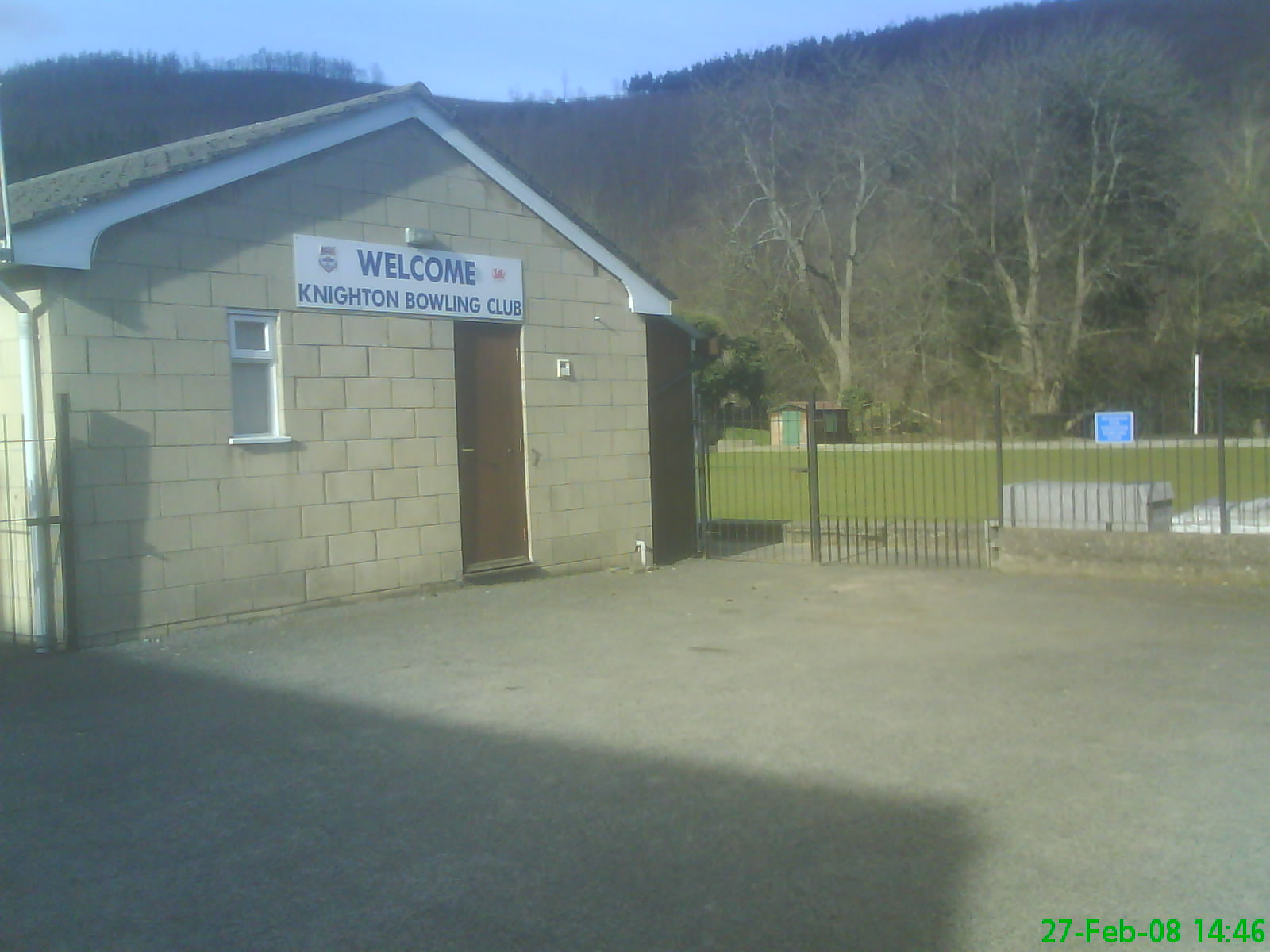
Bowling Club

Knighton has rugby, cricket, football and hockey teams. It has a nine-hole golf course, designed by Harry Vardon in 1906.

Knighton Town F.C. plays in the Ardal Leagues which is the third tier of the Welsh football pyramid. Arthur Rowley, brother of England international Jack Rowley, managed the team.

Knighton has a swimming pool and leisure centre.

In July 2009, Knighton hosted Round 2 of the British Enduro Championship. The Tour of Britain Men's cycle race passed through Knighton in 2014.

== Notable residents ==
In birth date order:

- Alfred Edwards (1850–1923), businessman, was with Herbert Kilpin one of the charter members of the Italian club A.C. Milan, originally named Milan Foot-Ball and Cricket Club. He was also elected its first president.
- Kenneth Turpin (1915–2005), a former Provost of Oriel College, Oxford and Vice-Chancellor of the University of Oxford, retired to the town.
- Ron Powell (1929–1992), football goalkeeper, played over 500 senior games.
- Dick Heckstall-Smith (1934–2004), saxophonist and composer, raised near the town.
- Emma Manners, Duchess of Rutland (born 1963), estranged wife of David Manners, 11th Duke of Rutland and châtelain of Belvoir Castle, was born and raised locally. Her maiden name was Emma Watkins.
- Ed James (born 1976) born locally, Chairman of Birmingham Press Club since 2012 and a radio presenter of Heart West Midlands.
- Chaz Davies (born 1987), motorcycle racer, born locally, the 2011 World Supersport champion.

== Economy ==
The town's shops serve a large rural hinterland and employ 18 per cent of the active population – almost as many as manufacturing, at 18.81 per cent. Otherwise Knighton has little industry. Most young people leave after completing their education. Tourism is a crucial area hit hard by the foot and mouth epidemic of 2001.
Although wages are low and over 20 per cent of families have no car, Knighton has an unemployment rate (2001) of just 2.88 per cent.

Responsibility for economic development lies with the Welsh Government. The town's remoteness means it has few commuters. Most of the employed (69.45 per cent in 2001) work within a 12 miles (19 km) area.

== Education ==
Knighton has a primary school, but for state secondary education pupils travel by bus 8 miles (13 km) to the John Beddoes Campus of Newtown High School in Presteigne. Until 1974 Knighton had a secondary modern school, on the site of the current primary school. Knighton Church in Wales Primary School (until 1998 Knighton Voluntary Primary School) had 299 pupils in 2008. In its most recent Estyn inspection it was graded Good or Satisfactory, the inspectors being largely positive, but critical of "low expectations".

== Geography ==
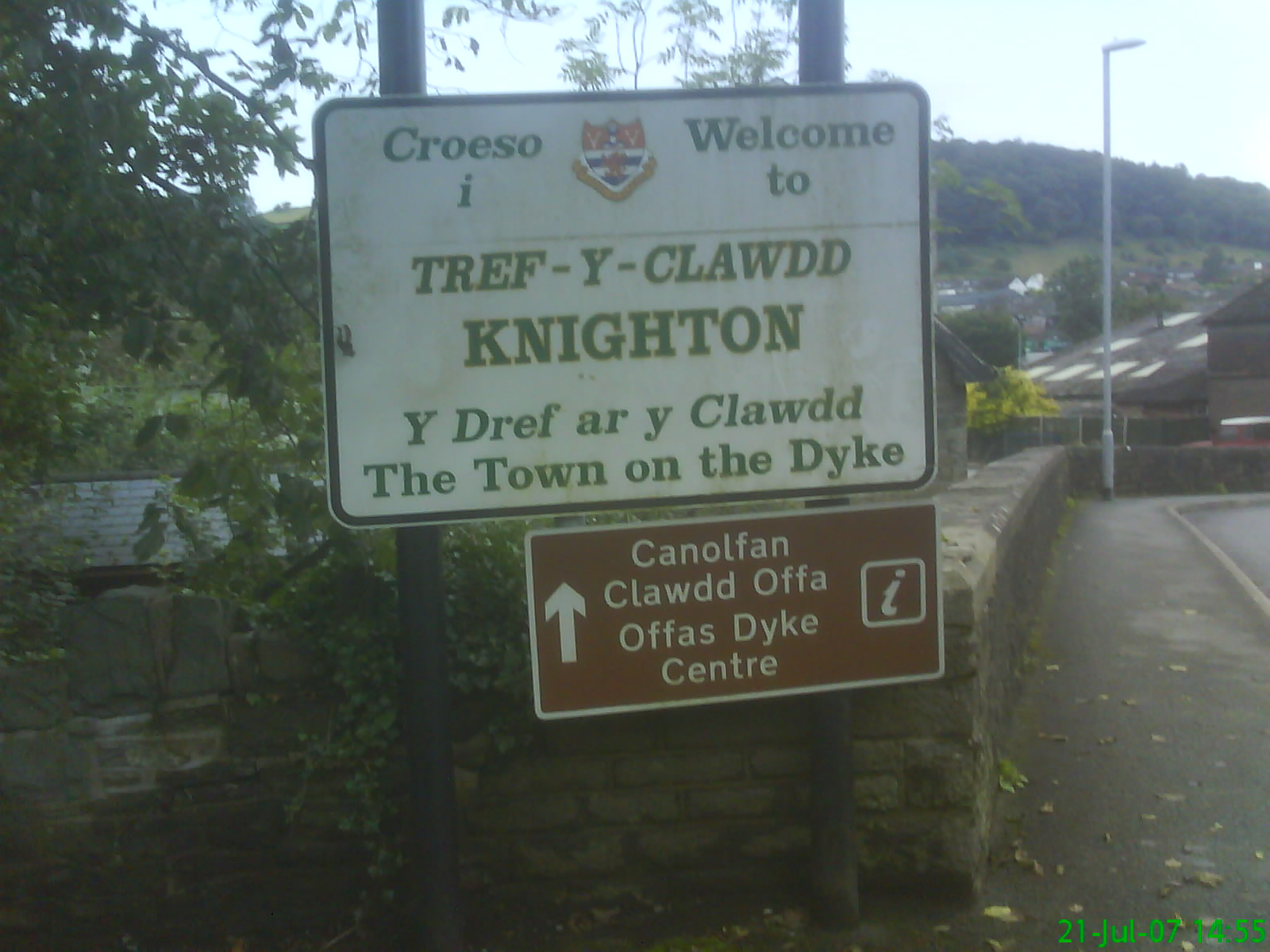
Entry to Knighton

=== Location ===
Knighton is 137 miles (220 km) from the UK capital city, London, 86 miles (138 km) from the Welsh capital of Cardiff, and 19 miles (31 km) from the county town, Llandrindod Wells. For the smaller part of Knighton that lies in Shropshire, the unitary authority administrative centre, and county town of Shrewsbury is 34 miles (55 km) away.

The town is remote, but connected with the following towns and villages.

=== Geology and geomorphology ===
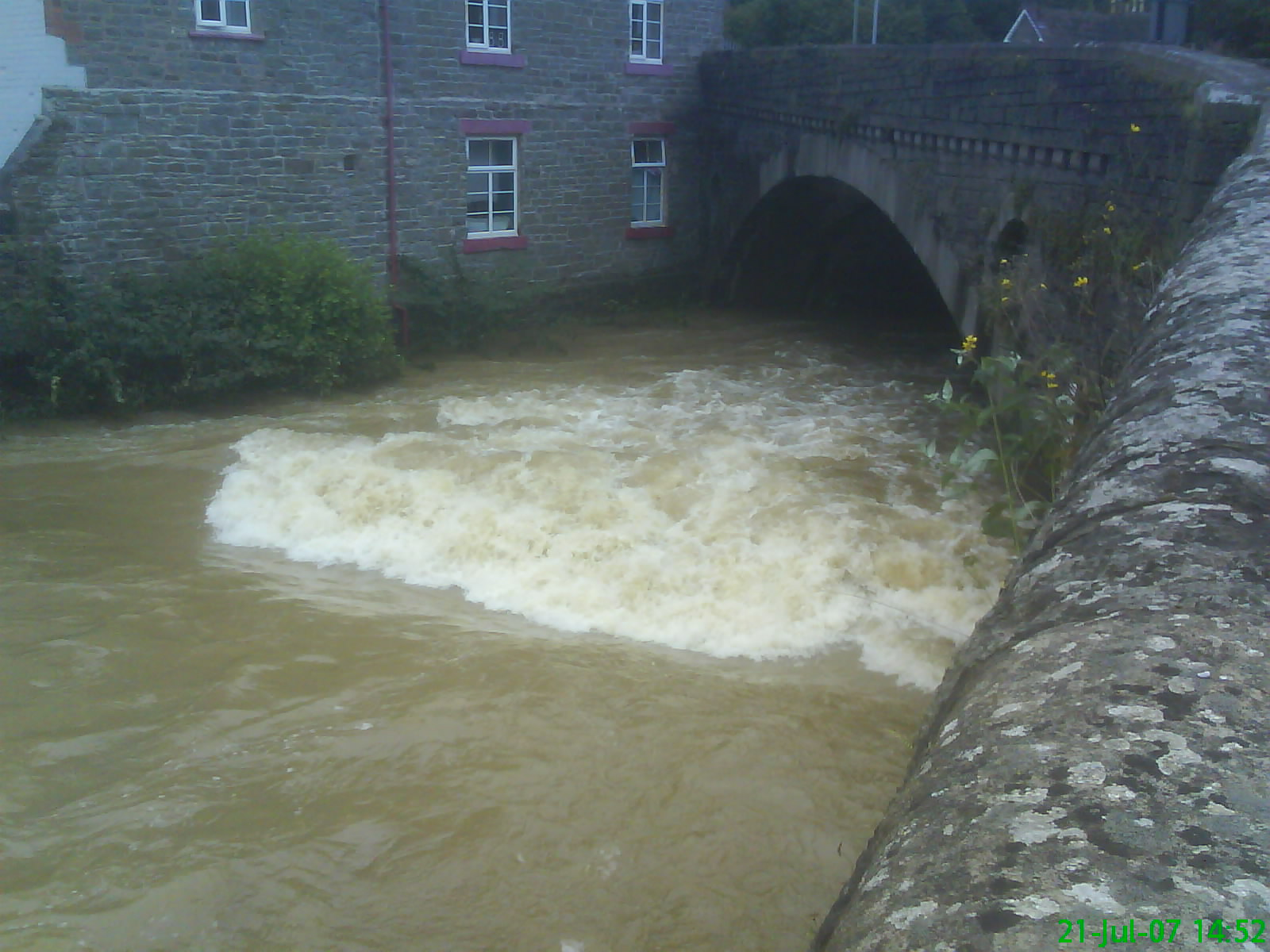
River Teme in spate

Knighton is at 52°20′40″N 3°03′0″W, in a sparsely populated tract of mid-Wales and the English border marked by a hilly plateau cut by narrow river valleys with a broadly east–west axis. To the west, ground rises steeply towards Radnor Forest, and to the north more gently to the summit of Clun Forest. Turning east, the elevation falls gently to the Shropshire Plain. To the south of the town stands Llan Wen hill.

The town centre lies some 174 metres (571 ft) above sea level, although the surrounding hills – Bailey Hill is the highest – rise to 418 metres (1,371 ft). The only major river is the River Teme.

According to Samuel Lewis (a mid 19th-century visitor):

... at the head of a deep vale sheltered on all sides by hills of lofty elevation, crowned with timber of luxuriant growth, and commanding extensive and finely varied prospects over the surrounding country

Knighton rests on Ludlovian rocks of the Silurian Period. It was close to the southern edge of the ice-sheet during the last ice age.

=== Climate ===
The average temperature and rainfall figures, taken between 1971 and 2000 at the Met Office weather station in Shawbury, can be seen on that page. Though 35 miles (56 km) away, Shawbury is the nearest recording station and has a similar climate. Knighton is in the rain shadow of the Cambrian Mountains, making it slightly warmer and notably drier than the average for Wales.

On 18 August 2004, fish fell from the sky in one of the most recent instances of raining animals within the United Kingdom.

== Transport ==
Knighton is about 30 miles (48 km) midway between Shrewsbury and Hereford, at the junction of the A4113 and the A488 road.

Local bus services are limited and subsidised.

Knighton railway station is on the Heart of Wales Line. Transport for Wales Rail provides direct trains to Shrewsbury and to Swansea via Llandrindod. The station itself is just inside Shropshire, England.

The nearest international airport is at Birmingham. Light aircraft can fly from Welshpool Airport and Shobdon Aerodrome.

== See also ==
Knighton travel guide from Wikivoyage
