= Ye Olde Tavern, Kington =

Olde Tavern
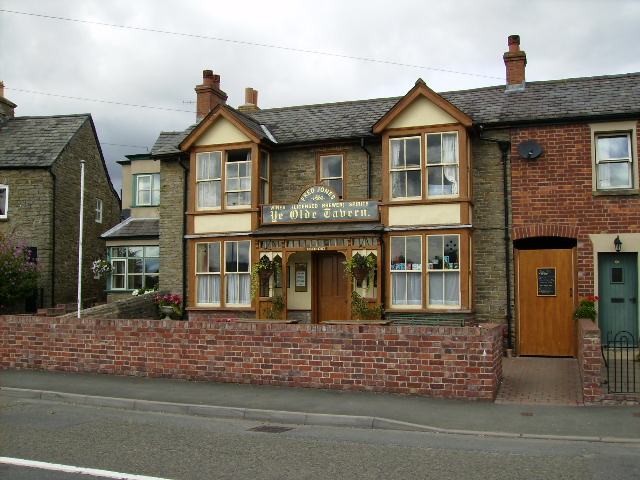
- Interactive map of the Olde Tavern area

General information
- Type: Public house
- Location: 22 Victoria Road, Kington, Herefordshire,, England
- Coordinates: 52.205100°N 3.024298°W

Ye Olde Tavern is a Grade II listed public house at 22 Victoria Rd, Kington, Herefordshire, England, built in the late 18th/early 19th century.

It is on the Campaign for Real Ale's National Inventory of Historic Pub Interiors, and features a parlour, public bar, plus a side-room, into which beer is provided via a serving hatch.

The Herefordshire branch of the Campaign for Real Ale made it their Pub of the Year for 2009.
