= Lady Hawkins' School =

Location
- Park View; Kington, Herefordshire, HR5 3AR; England; 52.2025°N 3.0385°W

Information
- Type: Academy
- Established: 29 September 1632
- Local authority: Herefordshire
- Department for Education URN: 137608 Tables
- Ofsted: Reports
- Chair: Stephen Grist
- Headteacher: Allen Brace
- Gender: Mixed
- Age: 11 to 16
- Enrolment: 267 (as of 2024)
- Website: lhs.hereford.sch.uk

Lady Hawkins' School is a 11-16 secondary school in Kington, Herefordshire. The headteacher is Allen Brace.

The school is now housed in modern buildings erected in 1962 and 1973, with other buildings erected more recently, almost all of which have been refurbished between 1990 and 1995 to meet the challenges and demands of recent curriculum developments. The original 1600s building is now in use as a private residence.

== History ==
The school was founded on 29 September 1632 with funding from the estate of Lady Margaret Hawkins, widow of Sir John Hawkins, a slaver. She came from a Herefordfordshire family, being the daughter of Charles Vaughan. She was married to Hawkins for a few years in the 1590s before he died in the Caribbean.

Lady Hawkins died in 1619, leaving £800 'for the purchasing of lands or tenements of a yearly value of forty pounds for and towards the perpetual maintenance of a learned and choice preaching divine, the Master, to keep a free school in Kington, in the County of Herefordshire, and of a learned and discreet Usher under him, for the instructing and teaching of youths and children in literature and good education.'

Captain Anthony Lewis, servant to Lady Hawkins and acting executor of the will, purchased School Farm, Upper Hergest, in 1622 to produce the necessary forty pounds a year for running the school. He paid £26 13s 4d for a piece of ground in Kington on which the school would be built. Lewis contracted John Abel of Sarnesfield to build it. John Abel, who was Carpenter to King Charles I, was to provide the materials and was paid £240 for his work.

The sixth form was one of the smallest in Herefordshire and was threatened with closure in 2006; however, it remained open until 2019 when it finally closed.

The school has a tradition on visiting the nearby parish church, St. Mary's, to give thanks for its foundation and all those who have served in it over three and a half centuries.

== School library ==
Among the possessions of the school are books deposited at Hereford Cathedral Library, including a volume of theological commentary printed by Shakespeare´s associate Richard Field (1561–1624). This volume contains a letter which appears to be addressed to Anne Hathaway. The letter formed part of the binding for two works by Johann Piscator which were bound together.

The school has also deposited documents at Herefordshire Archive and Records Centre.

== Notable former pupils ==
- Leslie Law, Former British Olympic eventer.
- Ellie Goulding, Music artist.
- Jessica Raine, Actress.
