= Kington Museum =

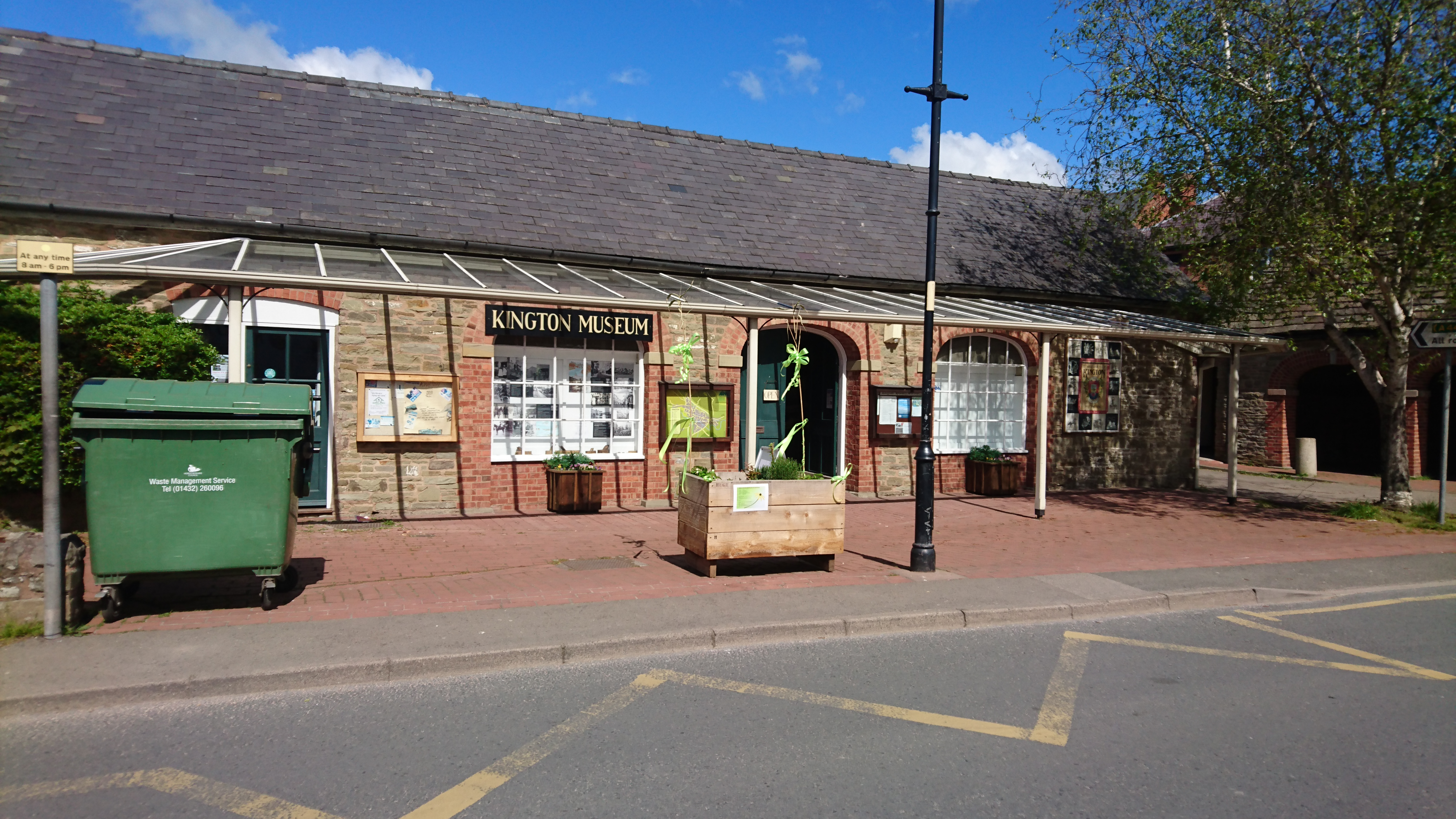
- Established: June 1986
- Location: Mill Street, Kington, Herefordshire, England
- Coordinates: 52.203143°N 3.031825°W
- Type: Local Museum
- Website: kingtonmuseum.com

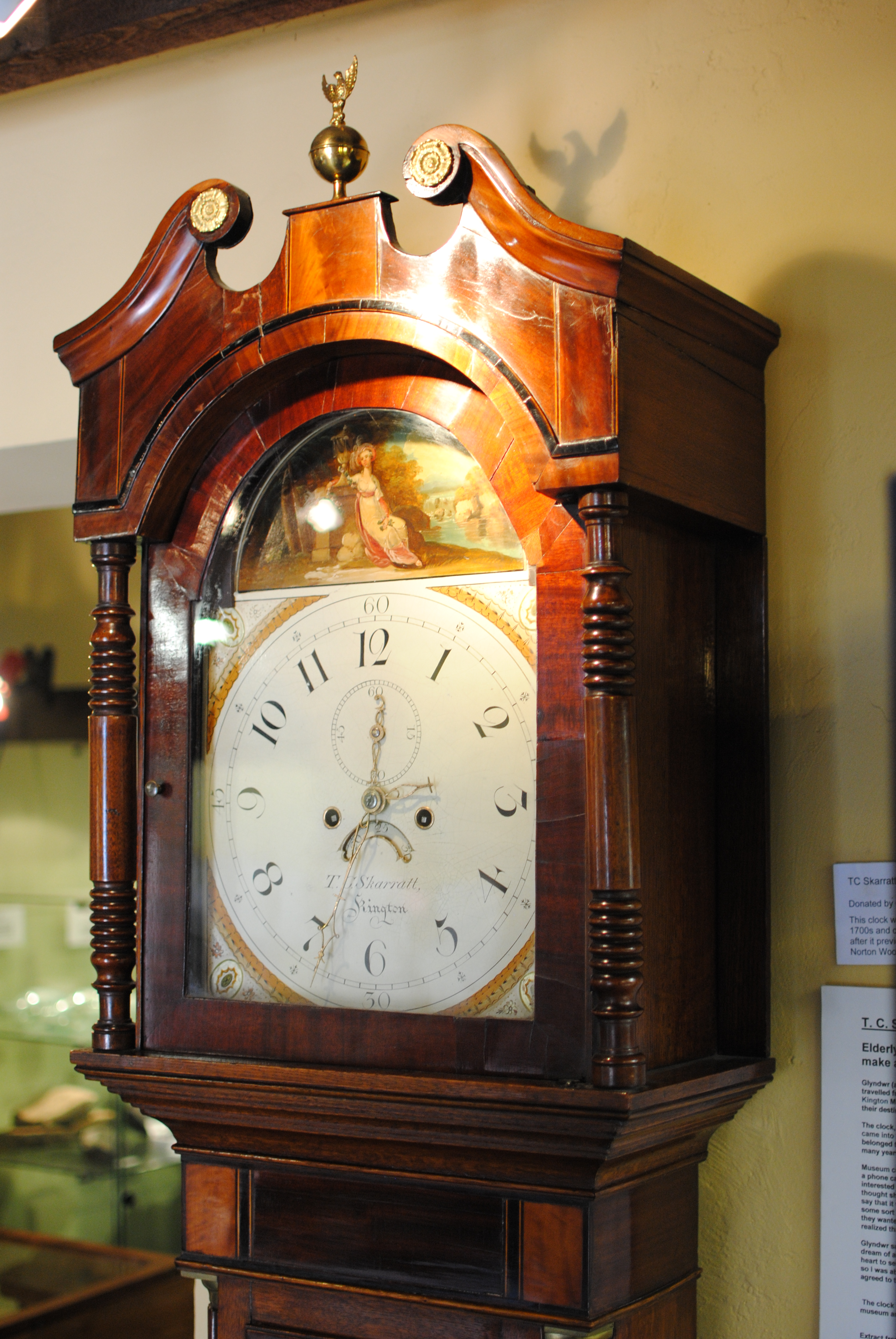
A long-case clock, made in Kington in the 1700s, now in the museum.

Kington Museum and History Centre

Kington Museum is a volunteer-run local history museum on Mill Street, in the market town of Kington, Herefordshire, England. It opened in June 1986 and occupies the stable block of the former King’s Head Inn (demolished 1885). The building was extended in 1988, 1991 and 2005.

Its displays cover the history of Kington and the surrounding area, from prehistoric time to present day, and inlclude agriculture, milling and a model of the town's former railway station.
