= Kington, Herefordshire =

Town in Herefordshire, England

Coordinates: 52.2035°N 3.03°W

Kington
- Kington Market Hall

- Location within Herefordshire
- Population: 2,639 (2021 Census)
- OS grid reference: SO297566
  - London: 135 mi (217 km) ESE
- Unitary authority: Herefordshire
- Ceremonial county: Herefordshire
- Region: West Midlands
- Country: England
- Sovereign state: United Kingdom
- Post town: Kington
- Postcode district: HR5
- Dialling code: 01544
- Police: West Mercia
- Fire: Hereford and Worcester
- Ambulance: West Midlands
- UK Parliament: North Herefordshire

Kington is a market town and civil parish in Herefordshire, England. It is situated on the River Arrow, near the England-Wales border, approximately 16 miles (26 km) northwest of Hereford, 34 miles (55 km) west of Worcester, and 78 miles (126 km) west-southwest of Birmingham. The parish had a population of 2,639 at the 2021 census.

== Geography ==
Kington is 2.0 miles (3.2 km) from the border with Wales, and lies on the western side of Offa's Dyke. The town is in the shadow of Hergest Ridge, and on the River Arrow, where it is crossed by the A44 road. It is 19 miles (31 km) northwest of Hereford, the county town. Nearby towns include Presteigne, Builth Wells, Knighton and Leominster. The centre of the town is situated at 522 feet (159 m) above sea level. The civil parish covers an area of 860 acres (350 ha).

== History ==
The name Kington is derived from 'King's-ton', being Anglo-Saxon for "King's Town", similar to other nearby towns such as Presteigne meaning "Priest's Town" and Knighton being "Knight's Town".

The land on which Kington is sited was held by Anglo-Saxons in 1066, but devastated. After the Norman Conquest Kington then passed to the Crown on the downfall in 1075 of Roger de Breteuil, 2nd Earl of Hereford. Before 1121, King Henry I gave Kington to Adam de Port, who founded a new Marcher barony in this part of the early Welsh Marches. Kington seems to have been a quiet barony and was associated with the office of sheriff of Hereford. In 1172, Adam de Port, probably the great-grandson of Henry Port, rebelled and fled the country. He returned in 1174 with a Scottish army, only to flee from the resulting Battle of Alnwick to the great mirth of the Norman court. With this his barony of Kington was taken by the Crown and became an appurtenance of the office of Sheriff of Hereford, finally being granted to William de Braose, 4th Lord of Bramber in 1203 for £100. The castle then saw action in the Braose Wars against King John, and is likely to have been destroyed by royal forces in August 1216. Within a few years a new fortress was commenced and the nearby Huntington Castle and Kington Castle were abandoned. All that remains of Kington Castle today is a great outcrop of rock topped by a few fragmentary earthworks. The old town clustered around the castle and Norman church on top of a defensive hill above the River Arrow.

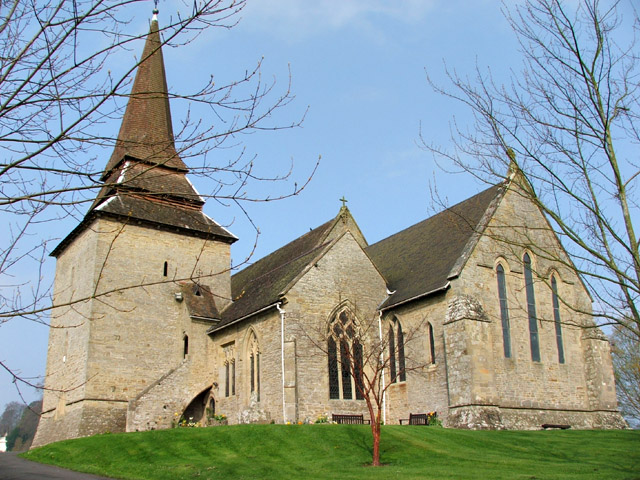
St Mary's church, situated on higher ground above the town centre

‘Chingtune' was recorded in the Domesday Book in 1086, the name meaning 'king's town or manor', high on the hill above the town where St. Mary's Church now stands. The new Kington, called Kyneton in the Fields, was laid out between 1175 and 1230 on land bordering the River Arrow and possibly designated as part of the Saxon open-field system.

Situated on the direct route the drovers took from Hergest Ridge and with eight annual fairs, Kington grew in importance as a market town, and there is still a thriving livestock market on Thursdays. The town retains the medieval grid pattern of streets and back lanes.

In the chapel of St. Mary's Church, there is the alabaster tomb of Sir Thomas Vaughan of nearby Hergest Court, slain at the Battle of Banbury in 1469, and his wife, Elen Gethin. The ghost of Sir Thomas, and also that of the Black Dog of Hergest, are said to haunt the area around Hergest Ridge. The Black Dog's sighting reputedly presages death.

== Governance ==
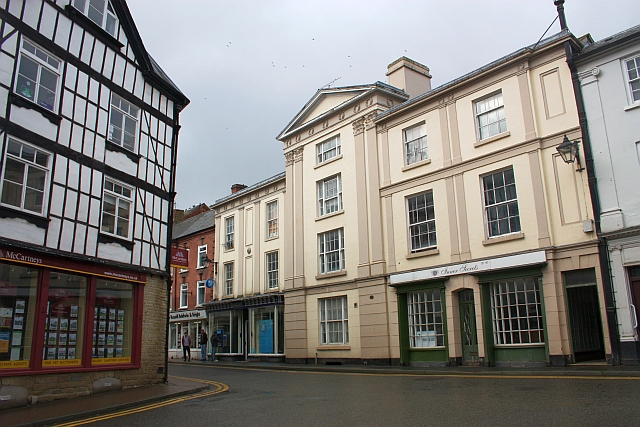
The former Kington Town Hall

An electoral ward in the name of Kington Town exists. This ward had a population taken at the Kington Parish of 3,240. The former Kington Town Hall was completed in 1820.

== Population ==
Census data is as follows:

Population	Year
1,424	1801
1,617	1811
1,820	1821
2,142	1831
2,091	1841
1,939	1851
2,178	1861
2,126	1871
2,952	1881
2,086	1891
1,944	1901
1,819	1911
1,688	1921
1,742	1931
1,890	1951
1,856	1961
1,915	1971
2,067	1981
2,147	1991
2,597	2001
2,626	2011
2,639	2021

== Climate ==
As with the rest of the UK, Kington benefits from a maritime climate, with limited seasonal temperature ranges, and generally moderate rainfall throughout the year. The nearest met office weather station is Lyonshall, around 2.5 miles (4.0 km) to the east of the town.

The absolute maximum temperature recorded is 33.5 °C (92.3 °F) during August 1990. In an average year however, the warmest day should record 27.8 °C (82.0 °F), with a total of 7.7 days reporting a value of 25.1 °C (77.2 °F) or above.

The absolute minimum temperature is −16.5 °C (2.3 °F), reported in December 1981. Typically 44 nights should record an air frost.

Rainfall averages around 845 mm (33.3 inches) a year, with over 1 mm (0.039 in) falling on 136 days. All averages refer to the period 1971 to 2000.

Climate data for Lyonshall, elevation 155 m (509 ft), 1971–2000, extremes 1960–2007
Month	Jan	Feb	Mar	Apr	May	Jun	Jul	Aug	Sep	Oct	Nov	Dec	Year
Record high °C (°F)	14.1 (57.4)	16.8 (62.2)	21.1 (70.0)	24.0 (75.2)	25.5 (77.9)	31.2 (88.2)	33.0 (91.4)	33.5 (92.3)	25.8 (78.4)	21.5 (70.7)	16.6 (61.9)	14.4 (57.9)	33.5 (92.3)
Mean daily maximum °C (°F)	6.4 (43.5)	6.7 (44.1)	9.4 (48.9)	11.9 (53.4)	15.5 (59.9)	18.3 (64.9)	20.9 (69.6)	20.4 (68.7)	17.2 (63.0)	13.1 (55.6)	9.4 (48.9)	7.3 (45.1)	13.1 (55.6)
Mean daily minimum °C (°F)	1.1 (34.0)	1.0 (33.8)	2.6 (36.7)	3.9 (39.0)	6.5 (43.7)	9.3 (48.7)	11.5 (52.7)	11.1 (52.0)	9.0 (48.2)	6.3 (43.3)	3.5 (38.3)	2.0 (35.6)	5.7 (42.3)
Record low °C (°F)	−15.8 (3.6)	−12.8 (9.0)	−10.6 (12.9)	−4.2 (24.4)	−2.2 (28.0)	0.8 (33.4)	2.2 (36.0)	3.3 (37.9)	−0.6 (30.9)	−4.2 (24.4)	−7.2 (19.0)	−16.5 (2.3)	−16.5 (2.3)
Average precipitation mm (inches)	91.8 (3.61)	68.0 (2.68)	68.0 (2.68)	58.6 (2.31)	55.2 (2.17)	59.2 (2.33)	46.6 (1.83)	62.8 (2.47)	74.9 (2.95)	81.9 (3.22)	80.3 (3.16)	98.5 (3.88)	845.8 (33.29)
Source 1: Met Office
Source 2: KNMI

== Economy ==
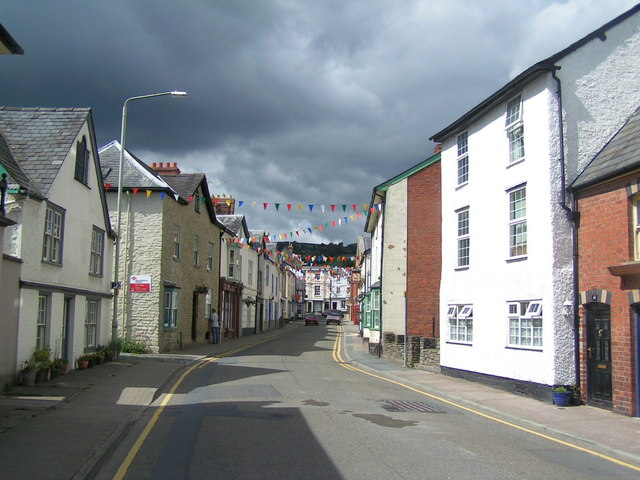
Bridge Street

In the 13th century the new medieval town was formed at the foot of the hill and became primarily a wool-trading market town on an important drovers' road. Its location and historic character is the reason why so many waymarked long-distance footpaths pass through Kington today, including the Mortimer Trail, the Herefordshire Trail and the Offa's Dyke Path. The Black and White Village Trail follows the half-timbered cottages and houses in local Herefordshire villages.

In the 1870s, an assessment was thus: "The trade of the town is chiefly with the agriculturists of the adjoining county of Radnor. There are two banking establishments, viz., the head offices of the Kington and Radnorshire bank (Messrs. Davies, Banks, & Davies), established in 1808, and a branch of the Midland Banking Company, Limited. There is an extensive iron foundry, nail, and agricultural implement manufactory carried on by Messrs. James. Meredith & Co., and the building and tanning trades are well represented. There are also some extensive corn mills and malt-houses. About four miles west of the town are the Old Radnor lime rocks, which are celebrated for their superior quality for building and for agricultural purposes. The market day is Tuesday, considerable business being transacted on that day in eggs, butter, poultry, &c., and is the mart to which the Welsh send their produce, to meet dealers who frequent this town from all quarters."

During the Second World War, the large Kington Camp was constructed close to the town by the War Office. It was first used by the British as a re-grouping point after Dunkirk, housing returned soldiers in often poor conditions. In 1943-4, Wimpeys built two US General Hospitals to cater for predicted wounded from the European campaigns. Each employed 500 US military and administrative personnel and 50 local people. There were administrative buildings, labs, operating theatres and dental clinics as well as personnel quarters, chapels, rehabilitation wards, cinemas, mess halls, warehouses, and laboratories. Between 1944–1945 there were 13,000 patients. After the war buildings were used by the Polish Resettlement Corps (many of the Poles who had fought alongside Western allies did not wish to return to a newly communist dominated Poland). Many of the buildings at the Camp remain standing, although two-thirds have disappeared since the Second World War. Some are used by local businesses.

The Kington economy has suffered along with the fortunes of the farming industry in the area. Its rural location and lack of good transport connections means local unemployment has been high for many decades, with low pay rates and many part-time occupations in small businesses including farming and the retail and service sectors. There is a small tourist industry, though concentrated in the summer months, but it maintains the air of an unspoilt town on the borders. There is a traditional livestock market, situated off Duke Street, on a Thursday, where farmers bring their stock to market. There is currently a weekly food and crafts market every Friday and also a W.I market in Bridge Street on Friday morning, home cooked goods are sold. The High Street has a number of resilient and interesting independent shops.

=== Kington Connected (KC3) ===
KC3 was begun in 1993, when BT Group, Apple, the Department of Trade and Industry and the Rural Development Commission chose Kington to host a pilot study into the effect that IT and sophisticated telecommunications might have on small communities. Fifteen ISDN lines were installed for digital data transmission and KC3 became a remote office and payroll service for companies including ICI and banks, with remote work. There was also significant support to local businesses and schools. In 2006, KC3 split the commercial side from the community and voluntary side. The community and voluntary side ceased trading in March 2007 and Marches Access Point was formed to continue to provide computer access, resource centre and training opportunities. The commercial side of KC3 became KC3.net and in 2009 there was a further management buyout by V8 media which signalled the end of KC3.net in Kington.

The project was featured in an episode of The Net in June 1994.

== Education ==
The town has a primary school and a combined secondary school and sixth form — the Lady Hawkins' School. Sir Francis Drake's cousin Sir John Hawkins married, and in her will, Lady Hawkins left £800 to the town to establish the school. The school is unique in having special permission from the Royal Navy to fly the White Ensign on its foundress day. Notable former students include singer Ellie Goulding and actor Jessica Raine.

== Transport ==
The A44 road heads around the town on a bypass; it previously went through the town centre.

Bus services run to Newtown, Powys, Llandrindod Wells, Knighton, Presteigne, Leominster and Hereford. The town has its own bus company, Sargeants Brothers, which was founded in the 1920s, and today provides bus services to Hereford and Mid Wales. The bus depot is on Mill Street.

The Kington Tramway opened in 1820 and ran until taken over by the railways.

The Leominster and Kington Railway received royal assent in July 1854, and the 13 miles and 25 chain length opened to Kington in August 1857. Leased to the Great Western Railway from 1862, it was later amalgamated with it. When the Kington and Eardisley Railway replaced the tramway in 1875, it built a new through station at Kington, which it jointly owned with the Leominster and Kington Railway. The old station, slightly to the south, became the goods depot.

Traffic rose during World War II, with the US Army hospital camp at Hergest. Decline set in after the war, and it closed to passengers on 5 February 1955. Freight traffic ceased in 1964, after which the track was taken up and the line abandoned.

Today the nearest station is Knighton on the Heart of Wales Line, though Leominster is quicker to drive to and has more frequent services, being on the Welsh Marches Line. Bus services mostly connect with Hereford railway station, as well with Llandrindod railway station.

Shobdon Aerodrome is located close to the town.

== Media ==
Local news and television programmes are provided by BBC West Midlands and ITV Central. Television signals are received from the Ridge Hill TV transmitter and the local relay transmitter.

Local radio station are BBC Hereford and Worcester, Sunshine Radio, Capital Mid-Counties, Greatest Hits Radio Herefordshire & Worcestershire, and Hits Radio Herefordshire & Worcestershire.

The town is served by the local newspaper, Hereford Times.

== Sport ==
Kington Golf Club, at 1,284 feet (391 m) above sea level on Bradnor Hill, is the highest 18-hole golf club in England. The course opened in 1926 and was designed by Cecil Hutchison, who was also involved in the design of Pulborough. The course is of 6,000 yards and has no bunkers.

Kington Town F.C. play in the West Midlands (Regional) League.

Kington has also been the host town for the Marin Rough (cycle) Ride since 2003.

== Tourism ==
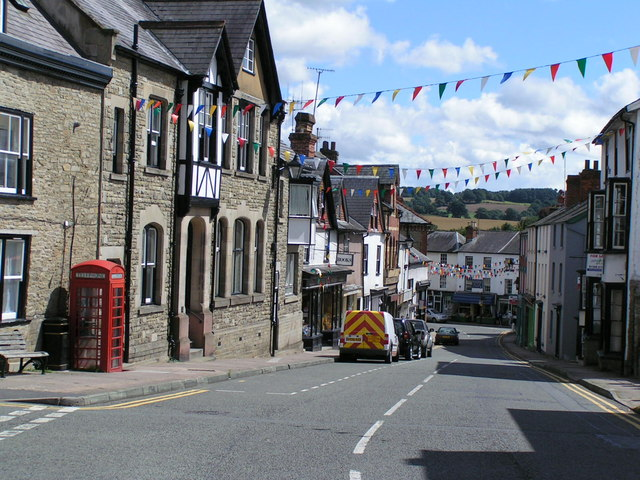
Church Street

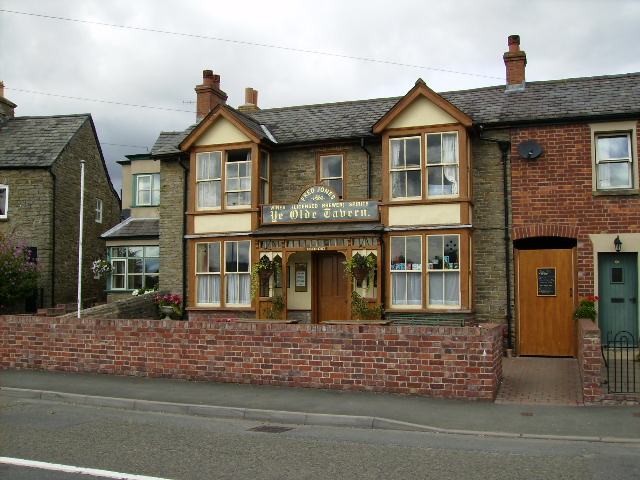
Ye Olde Tavern

Kington Museum is open April to September inclusive, and is on Mill Street in the town centre. Near the town is Hergest Croft Gardens, part of the Hergest Estate, which is open to the public March to October. In June, for several weeks, is the annual Kington Festival in the town.

Ye Olde Tavern is a late 18th/early 19th century Grade II listed public house at 22 Victoria Rd. It is on the Campaign for Real Ale's National Inventory of Historic Pub Interiors.

The Oxford Arms on Duke Street is a Grade II-listed former coaching inn with an 18th-centurey building recorded on the national heritage list for England. In 2923, the property was purcahsed by Open Arms Kington, a community interest company, with plans to restpre it as a community pub and multi-purpose venue. The project was awarded development funding by the national Lottery Heritage Fund in November 2024.

The Burton Hotel is a hotel and health centre, on Mill Street. The town also has a Youth Hostel on Victoria Road, which is open from late March to late October.

== Twinning ==
Kington has been twinned with the commune of Marines in northern France since 1979. The two places are of a similar population. In Marines there is a residential side-street called "Place Kington", whilst in Kington there is a covered space by the market hall called "Place-de-Marines".

== Notable people ==
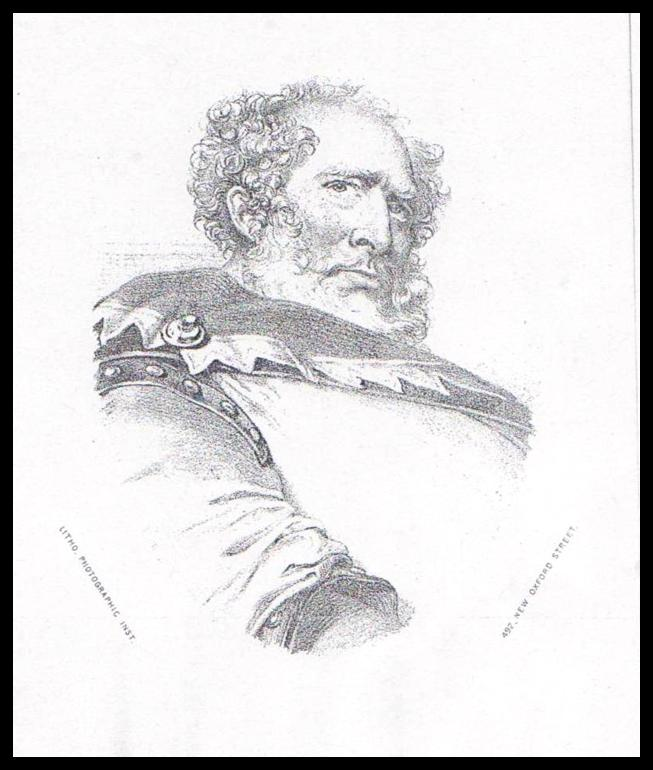
Stephen Kemble as Falstaff

- Thomas Hill (died 1653), a Puritan divine, in 1642, preached to the House of Commons at St Margaret's Westminster
- Thomas Lewis (1689 – ca. 1737), cleric and vitriolic High Church writer of the Bangorian controversy.
- Stephen Kemble (1758–1822), theatre manager, actor, and writer, member of the Kemble family.
- Alfred Russel Wallace (1823–1913), naturalist, explorer, geographer, anthropologist, biologist and illustrator; lived locally in 1839
- Arthur Willner (1881–1959), war-time emigre composer, lived in the gardener's cottage of Gravel Hill Villa, 1939-1945.
- Ernest John Moeran (1894–1950), composer, lived in Gravel Hill Villa in the town from 1938, where he composed his Rhapsody, Sinfonietta and parts of his Cello Concerto.
- Ffransis G. Payne (1900–1992), Welsh folklorist, author and museum curator.
- Sir Sidney Nolan (1917–1992), a leading Australian artist, from 1983 he lived a few miles north of Kington, next to the Welsh border
- Pauline Murray (1922-1994), actress, portrayed nurse Pauline in the 1966 alternate history British film, It Happened Here.
- Chris Menges (born 1940), cinematographer and film director of The Killing Fields and The Mission
- Mike Oldfield (born 1953), retired musician, songwriter and producer, known for his album Tubular Bells; lived nearby at Bradnor Hill, where he recorded his 1975 album Ommadawn.
- Leslie Law (born 1965), Olympic equestrian gold medallist at the 2004 Summer Olympics, attended Lady Hawkins' School.
- Jessica Raine (born 1981/1982), actress, played Jenny Lee in the television series Call the Midwife went to school locally.
- Ellie Goulding (born 1986), singer-songwriter, attended local Lady Hawkins' School

== In popular culture ==
Robert Goddard's 1995 murder mystery novel "Borrowed Time" is set in Kington. Sue Gee's 2004 novel The Mysteries of Glass is set in and around Kington and Lyonshall in 1860/61 and includes references to many local landmarks.

== See also ==
- List of towns in the United Kingdom
