= Andwell =

Village in Hampshire, England

Coordinates: 51.2680°N 1.0136°W

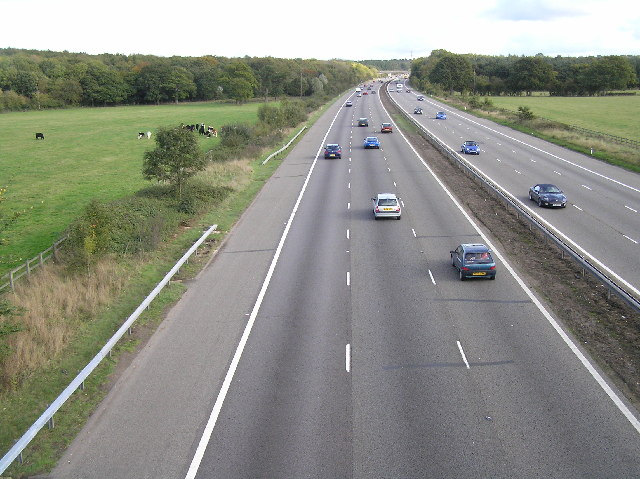
- Fields in Andwell, now bisected by the M3 motorway

- Location within Hampshire
- OS grid reference: SU6952
- Civil parish: Mapledurwell and Up Nately
- District: Basingstoke and Deane
- Shire county: Hampshire
- Region: South East
- Country: England
- Sovereign state: United Kingdom
- Police: Hampshire and Isle of Wight
- Fire: Hampshire and Isle of Wight
- Ambulance: South Central

Andwell is a village and former civil parish, now in the parish of Mapledurwell and Up Nately, in the Basingstoke and Deane district of Hampshire, England. Its former range was divided by the M3 motorway; it is also bounded to the north by the A30 road. Winchester College has owned land in the village since the 1390s. In 1931 the parish had a population of 20.

== Governance ==
The village of Andwell is part of the Basing ward of Basingstoke and Deane borough council. The borough council is a Non-metropolitan district of Hampshire County Council.

Andwell was formerly an extra-parochial tract, from 1866 Andwell was a civil parish in its own right, on 1 April 1932 the parish was abolished to form "Mapledurwell & Up Nately".

== Religious sites ==
The village is home to the ruins of Andwell Priory, a 12th-century Benedictine priory.

== Notable people ==
- Nick Halstead, racing driver and entrepreneur resides in Andwell.
