= Birmingham Press Club =

Birmingham Press Club is a press club based in the English city of Birmingham. Established in 1865, just six years after Concordia Press Club in Vienna, became the second oldest organisation of its type in the world. The club hosts a number of prestigious events, including the annual Midlands Media Awards. Members include print journalists from newspapers and magazines, as well as those from radio and television from around the Midlands, while several prominent figures have been inducted as honorary members, including journalists Ludovic Kennedy and Michael Parkinson, as well as Earl Spencer, the brother of Diana, Princess of Wales, and former British Prime Minister Margaret Thatcher.

In April 2012 local broadcaster Ed James was named as the new Chairman of Birmingham Press Club. He succeeded John Lamb, the press and PR manager for Birmingham Chamber of Commerce who had held the position since 2005.
