= Butter Wood =

UK Site of Special Scientific Interest

Coordinates: 51.264°N 0.978°W

- Site of Special Scientific Interest
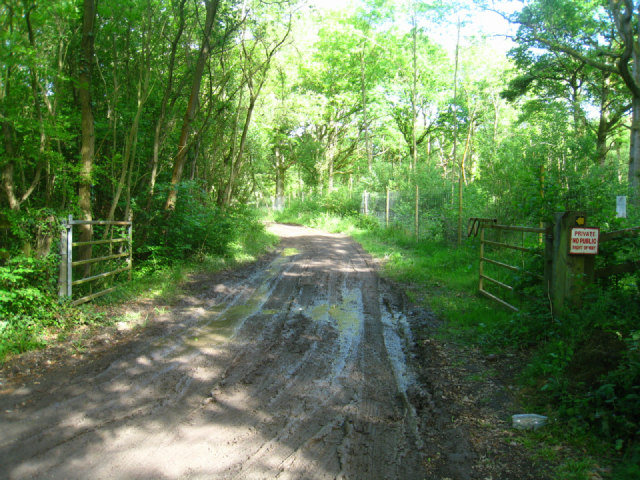
- Location of Butter Wood.
- Area of search: Hampshire
- Grid reference: SU 714 522
- Interest: Biological
- Area: 133.0 hectares (329 acres)
- Notification date: 1986
- Location map: Magic Map

Butter Wood is a 133-hectare (330-acre) biological Site of Special Scientific Interest (SSSI) east of Basingstoke in Hampshire. Part of Up Nately LNR, which is designated a Local Nature Reserve, is in the SSSI.

This site is mainly deciduous woodland with a diverse geology and structure. Most of it is former wood pasture, with many glades and broad bridleways, and there are also several copses which were managed as coppice with standards. Fauna include a rich Lepidoptera, including 25 species of butterfly.
