= Jordan Fantosme =

Anglo-Norman historian, chronicler and trouvère (died c. 1185)

Jordan Fantosme (died c. 1185) was an Anglo-Norman historian and poet. He was a cleric and probably the spiritual chancellor of the Diocese of Winchester. His major work is an Anglo-Norman verse chronicle of the war between Henry II of England and his son Henry the Young King and William I of Scotland in 1173–1174. As literature, it stands, according to its latest editor, "absolutely first class".

It is believed that Fantosme was an Italian (named Giordano Fantasma) who came to England in the train of Henry of Blois. A few lines from his poem suggest that he was Scoto-Norman, but this may have been inserted for the sake of the minstrels who would be reciting the piece. On the other hand, Fantosme may have simply identified with his adopted country, when he referred to messengers of William, who were also subjects of the Young King, as noz (ours). Considering his evident knowledge and skill in the Anglo-Norman language, the most likely hypothesis is that he was Anglo-Norman.

Fantosme was in fact a partisan of Henry II, though his work has been noted for its impartiality and admired for its detail and vigour. Nonetheless, it has been criticised frequently in the past, because of its unusual metre, as a deterioration of the continental French style, but more recent analysis by R. C. Johnston has led to the conclusion that in fact Fantosme's chronicle represents a conscious insular style of French verse. This hypothesis rests in part on the assumption that Fantosme integrated some characteristics of Occitan verse (perhaps coblas by the troubadour Jaufre Rudel) he encountered during a stay in Poitiers in the 1140s, where he probably studied under Gilbert de la Porrée. Fantosme was a contemporary and often claimed to be an eye-witness of the events he describes, but another probable source is Richard of Ilchester, his bishop. His work is in general a reliable historical source.

A Goliardic Latin poem defending the incarnation and atonement of Jesus Christ and which is preserved in many manuscripts is entitled in one near-contemporary source as Rithmus Jordanis Fantasmatis and it is likely that the author was Fantosme, or at least believed to be Fantosme. Elsewhere the skillful poem is entitled Prædicatio Goliæ ("Preaching of Golias").

A legal document of 10 April 1160 refers to a Magistrum Jordanum Fantasma in Fareham near Portsmouth. He is recorded in connexion with the diocese of Winchester between about 1150 and 1180. At about the time of the war he versified he was involved in a suit against John Joichel, who had an unlicensed a school in Winchester; he won the suit.

== Works ==
There are nineteenth-century English translations of his chronicle:

- Chronicle of the War Between the English and the Scots in 1173 and 1174. Francisque Michel, trans. (J. B. Nichols and Son, 1840)
- Chronicle of the war between the English and the Scots, AD 1173, 1174 (1856). In The Church Historians of England, Volume IV, Part 1, pp. 243–288. By English archivist Joseph Stevenson (1806–1895).
- Jordan Fantosme's Chronicle. Ed with translation and notes. R. C. Johnston. Oxford University Press 1981
