= Hugh de Port =

11th-century nobleman in England

Hugh de Port (c. 1015 – 1096), Anglo-Norman, believed to have arrived in England from Port-en-Bessin, leaving behind his son, Adam de Port, died 1133, who in that year owned land from the bishop of Bayeux. Possibly, Hugh was the first Norman Sheriff of Kent. De Port accumulated many properties, thought to have been no less than 53 at the time of the Domesday Book of 1086, when he held the manor of Bramshill (Bromeselle). Hugh de Port is associated closely with the history of Portsmouth; most of his estates were based in Hampshire.

Hugh's son and heir was Adam de Port.
