= Adam de Port (d. c. 1133) =

12th-century Anglo-Norman baron in England

Adam de Port (sometimes Adam of Port; d. c. 1133) was an Anglo-Norman nobleman and Baron of Kington.

Adam was the son of either Hugh de Port or Hubert de Port. The family originated in Port-en-Bessin in the Calvados region of Normandy.

Before 1121, Adam was granted the manor of Kington in Herefordshire by King Henry I of England. Kington had previously been in the Royal demesne. This grant is considered by I. J. Sanders to have created Adam the baron of Kington. Adam served King Henry in his household as a steward. He was a witness on four royal documents in 1115 and four more in 1121. Adam held 22 knight's fees in Hereford before his death.

Adam may have been the Sheriff of Herefordshire in 1130, and perhaps at other times also, as he may be the person listed as the sheriff in some documents. (Note: One document is dated to between 1107 and 1115, another is dated to between 1100 and 1128, and the last is dated to 1121.)

Adam founded Andwell Priory in Hampshire as a dependent priory of Tiron Abbey. He also gave gifts of land to Tiron itself and Les Deux Jumeaux, another dependency of Tiron.

Adam died between 1130 and 1133. His heir was his son Roger de Port, and he had two other sons named Hugh and Robert.
