= Adam de Port (d. 1174) =

12th-century Anglo-Norman baron in England

Adam de Port (d. after 1174) was an Anglo-Norman nobleman and Baron of Kington.

Adam was the son and heir of Roger de Port, who died before 1161, and Roger's wife Sybil. He had two brothers named Henry and Hugh. Through his possession of the manor of Kington in Herefordshire, he was considered by I. J. Sanders to have been the baron of Kington.

Adam's lands in 1161 owed scutage for seven and a half knight's fees, but in 1166 for the Cartae Baronum he was assessed at around twenty-three knight's fees.

Adam forfeited his barony in 1171 or 1172 for treason, for attempting to murder King Henry II of England. He also forfeited lands at Neufmarché. The medieval chronicler Roger of Howden claimed that Adam was exiled in 1172. Adam was a prisoner in 1172, when he was recorded as arriving in London. No other details of the plot are known.

Adam took part in the Revolt of 1173–74 on the side of King Henry's sons. Adam went to Scotland in the company of Roger de Mowbray in early 1174. Adam was involved with the invasion of northern England by King William the Lion, the King of Scots. In July 1174 Adam was part of the force led by King William that was defeated. Although King William was captured, Adam was not captured and escaped. Nothing is known of him after his escape, although he was fined in 1175 £200 by King Henry.

Adam's lands were held in the royal demesne until the reign of King John of England, when they were divided up amongst several noblemen. The lack of protest to the division strongly implies that Adam had no heirs that could inherit.
