= A44 road =

Major road in the United Kingdom

Coordinates: 52.19302°N 2.30335°W

A44

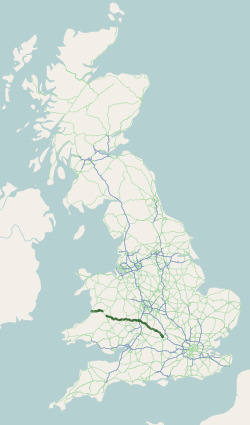

Route information
- Maintained by English local authorities and North & Mid Wales Trunk Road Agent
- Length: 154.3 mi (248.3 km)

Major junctions
- East end: A40 in Oxford
- A34 in Oxford A429 in Moreton-in-Marsh; A46 in Evesham A422 near Worcester; A38 in Worcester; A49 near Leominster A483 at Crossgates A470 in Rhayader

- West end: A487 in Aberystwyth

Location
- Country: United Kingdom
- Counties: England: Oxfordshire, Warwickshire, Gloucestershire, Worcestershire, Herefordshire; Wales: Powys, Ceredigion
- Primary destinations: Woodstock; Chipping Norton; Moreton-in-Marsh; Evesham; Worcester; Bromyard; Leominster; Kington; Old Radnor; Rhayader; Llangurig

Road network
- Roads in the United Kingdom; Motorways; A and B road zones
← A43	→ A45

The A44 is a major road in the United Kingdom that runs from Oxford in southern England to Aberystwyth in west Wales.

== History ==
The original (1923) route of the A44 was Chipping Norton to Aberystwyth. No changes were made to the route of the A44 in the early years. After the Second World War, the section between Rhayader and Llangurig was renumbered A470, as part of the 186 miles (299 km) long road in Wales that connects Cardiff on the south coast to Llandudno on the north coast. The A44 was extended to Oxford in the 1990s, replacing part of the A34 when the M40 motorway was completed.

On 1 April 1937, a part of the road was classed to be part of the Newport–Shrewsbury trunk road.

== Route ==
=== Oxford–Evesham ===
The road begins at a roundabout junction with the A40 road on the northern section of Oxford's ring road in Oxfordshire. It has a grade separated junction with the A34 road (leading to the M40 motorway and Winchester). From here, the road runs northwest, and has a 2-mile (3.2 km) section of dual-carriageway through the villages of Yarnton and Begbroke before reaching the town of Woodstock, home to Blenheim Palace. The road then reaches the main market street in Chipping Norton before entering the Cotswolds. The road here has many hills and turns, and is single-carriageway with some tight bends, with not much opportunity for overtaking.

The road then enters Gloucestershire, and the town of Moreton in Marsh, before sweeping up through woodland until it reaches Fish Hill near Broadway in Worcestershire. At this point, it becomes 3-lane and descends steeply through some sharp bends. It then bypasses Broadway before meeting up with the A46/A435 Evesham bypass.

=== Evesham–Leominster ===
On reaching the northern end of the Evesham bypass the A44 heads northwest, passing Wyre Piddle and the town of Pershore before reaching the crossroads near Spetchley. The road then crosses the M5 motorway and onto Worcester's eastern bypass (A4440). It then turns south along the bypass before rejoining its original line west into the city itself. The road passes the cathedral, crosses the River Severn and then meets the western end of the bypass.

After leaving Worcester, the A44 continues west past the village of Broadwas, following the River Teme until Knightwick where enters Herefordshire as it climbs over Bringsty Common before descending towards Bromyard. The A44 bypasses Bromyard town centre and heads west over the downs to Bredenbury. It then crosses the River Lugg before meeting the A49 Leominster bypass, where it turns left and heads through the town centre.

=== Leominster–Rhayader ===
After leaving Leominster, the A44 crosses the River Arrow to bypass Monkland. The road then heads towards the black and white villages of Eardisland and Pembridge. After Pembridge the A44 meanders west, passing numerous orchards en route, before reaching Lyonshall, where the road meets the A480 and passes Offa's Dyke. A couple of miles later and the A44 meets Kington. The road bypasses the town and follows the River Arrow before reaching the Welsh border.

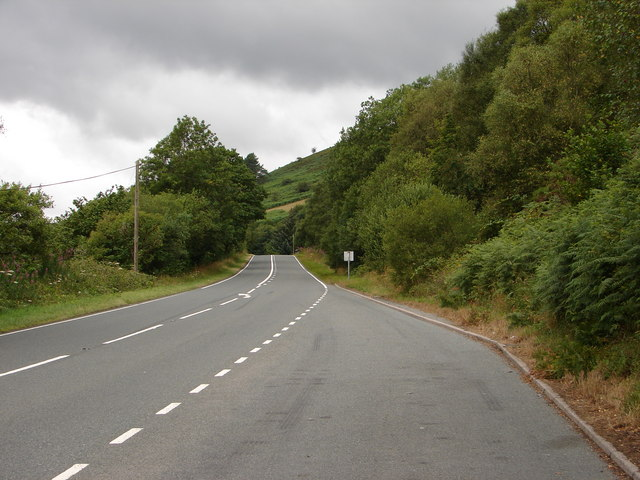
A44 at Penlon, near Pant Mawr, Powys

Leaving Herefordshire and entering Powys, the road continues through Walton and passes the village of New Radnor, before turning south to Llanfihangel Nant Melan. The road then turns northwest to do some serious hill-climbing before winding its way downhill to a plateau. A few miles later it reaches Penybont and Crossgates, where it meets the A483 road. Eight miles further the A44 reaches Rhayader.

A spoof sign on this section of the road, announcing "Llandegley International Airport 2½ m", has attracted international press coverage and been mentioned in Parliament.

=== Rhayader–Aberystwyth ===
On reaching the centre of Rhayader, traffic heads to the left of the clock tower before immediately turning right, where the road passes through the town and joins the A470 for 9 miles (14 km) to Llangurig, following the course of the River Wye. Leaving Llangurig, the road starts clinging to hillsides as it winds its way through the Cambrian Mountains.

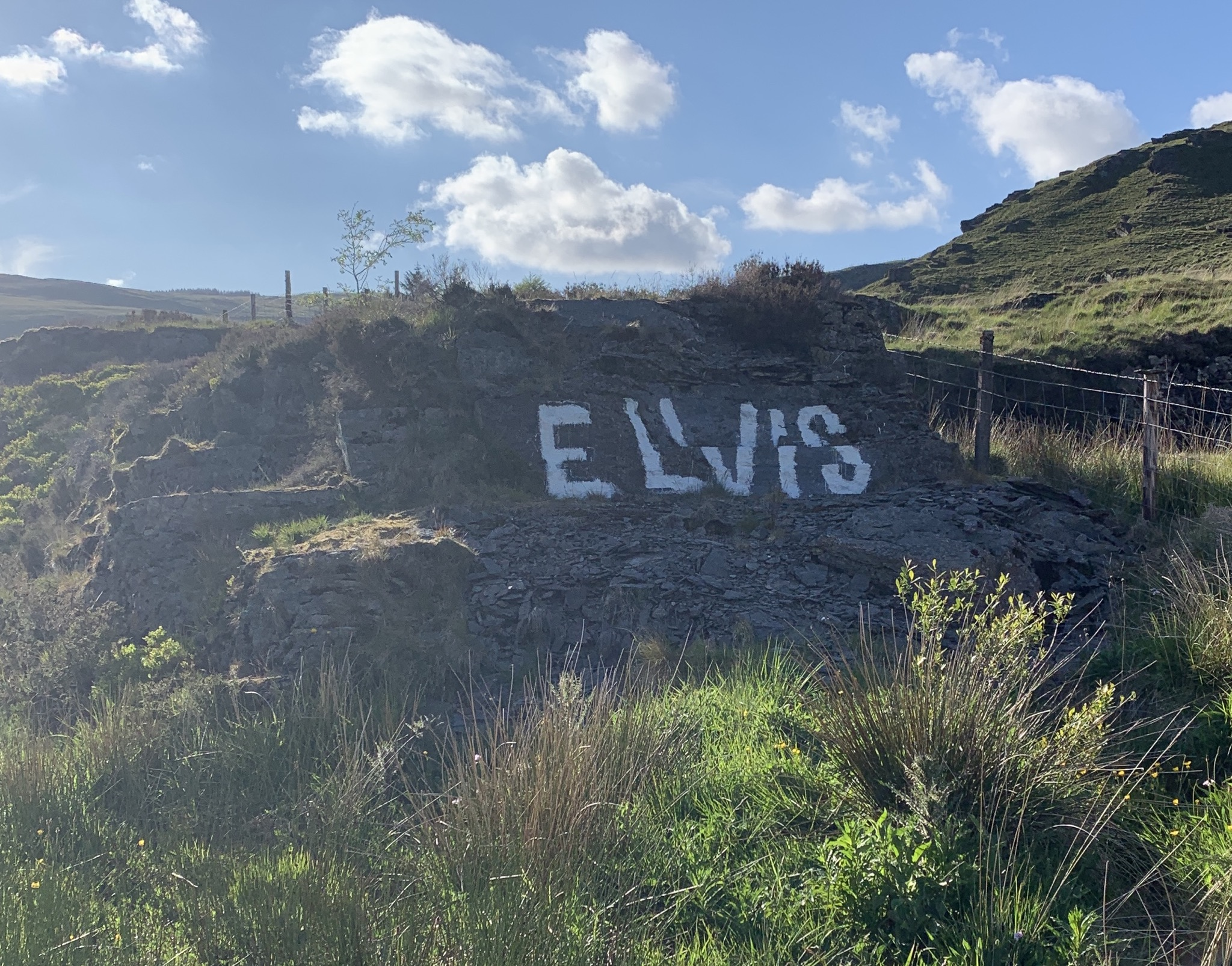
The 'Elvis Rock' beside the A44 road

The road enters Ceredigion and the next hamlet is Eisteddfa Gurig which, at 1339 feet (408 metres) above sea level, is its highest point and the location of the iconic Elvis Rock. The A44 then descends into the remote settlement of Ponterwyd. The road passes several abandoned mines en route to the villages of Goginan and Capel Bangor, where it meets the River Rheidol. The road then passes the village of Llanbadarn Fawr, continuing for the last mile through the outskirts of Aberystwyth before terminating on the A487 at Penglais Hill.

== Former routes ==
=== Bypasses and realignments ===
- Evesham: the route used to go through the centre of the town, but now runs to the north.
- Evesham–Worcester: the route used to run on a road to the south. The old route is now known as the B4084.
- Leominster–Kington: for 4.8 miles (7.7 km) west of Barons' Cross the road formerly followed a more northerly route, crossing the River Arrow at Eardisland.
- Kington, Herefordshire, the road bypasses the centre of the town using the former Leominster and Kington Railway trackbed north of the town.
- Wyre Piddle. In 2003 the A44 was rerouted down the A4538 between Evesham and Worcester and therefore no longer goes down Pershore High Street.

== Junction list ==
County	Location	mi	km	Destinations	Notes
Oxfordshire	Oxford	0.0	0.0	A40 / Woodstock Road (A4144 south) / Five Mile Drive to M40 – London, Cheltenham, City centre, Wolvercote, Summertown, Headington, Witney	Eastern terminus
Oxfordshire	Gosford and Water Eaton	0.4	0.64	A34 to M40 / A420 / A41 – Newbury, Swindon, The Midlands, Banbury, Northampton, Cowley, Abingdon, Bicester, Botley	To A41 signed eastbound only
Oxfordshire	Gosford and Water Eaton	0.7	1.1	A4260 north – Kidlington	Southern terminus of A4260
Oxfordshire	Shipton-on-Cherwell and Thrupp–Kidlington boundary	4.3	6.9	A4095 (Bladon Road / Upper Campsfield Road) – Witney, Bicester, Long Hanborough, Bladon, Kirtlington	
Oxfordshire	Chipping Norton	15.2	24.5	A3400 north – Stratford, Shipston	Southern terminus of A3400
Oxfordshire	Chipping Norton	16.6	26.7	A361 north (Banbury Road) / B4026 (Over Norton Road) – Banbury, Over Norton, Great Rollright, Bloxham	Bloxham signed eastbound only; eastern terminus of A361 concurrency
Oxfordshire	Chipping Norton	16.8	27.0	A361 south (Burford Road) to B4450 / B4026 – Burford, Churchill, Charlbury	Western terminus of A361 concurrency
Oxfordshire–Warwickshire boundary	Salford–Little Compton boundary	20.0	32.2	A436 west – Stow, Oddington	Eastern terminus of A436
Gloucestershire	Moreton-in-Marsh	24.8	39.9	A429 north (High Street) – Stratford, Batsford	Batsford signed westbound only; eastern terminus of A429 concurrency
Gloucestershire	Moreton-in-Marsh	24.9	40.1	A429 south (Stow Road) – Stow-on-the-Wold, Cirencester, Bourton-on-the-Water	Bourton signed eastbound only; western terminus of A429 concurrency
Gloucestershire	Bourton-on-the-Hill	28.4	45.7	A424 south-east – Stow, Bourton-on-the-Water	Information signed eastbound only; north-western terminus of A424
Worcestershire	Evesham	37.9	61.0	A46 south / Broadway Road to M5 / A435 – Cheltenham, Evesham, Pershore, Tewkesbury	Eastern terminus of A46 concurrency
Worcestershire	Norton and Lenchwick	40.2	64.7	A46 north to M42 / A435 – The North, Stratford, Birmingham, Redditch, Salford Priors, Alcester, Bidford	The North and Bidford signed eastbound only; western terminus of A46 concurrency
Worcestershire	Norton and Lenchwick	40.4	65.0	A4184 south / B4088 (Evesham Road) – Evesham, Harvington, Norton	Northern terminus of A4184
Worcestershire	Pinvin	46.5	74.8	A4104 west (Terrace Road) / B4082 (Main Street) – Village centre, Pershore, Upton Snodsbury	Eastern terminus of A4104
Worcestershire	Spetchley	51.1	82.2	A422 east / A4538 north (Pershore Lane) to M5 north / A38 – Stratford, Droitwich	Western terminus of A422; southern terminus of A4538
Worcestershire	Warndon	52.7	84.8	A4440 north (Nunnery Way) / Wildwood Drive – Worcester (east)	Eastern terminus of A4440 concurrency
Worcestershire	Whittington	53.5	86.1	A4440 west (Whittington Road) to M5 / A4103 / A449 / B4084 – Worcester (west), Hereford, Malvern, Pershore	Worcester signed westbound only; western terminus of A4440 concurrency
Worcestershire	Worcester	55.0	88.5	A38 south (Commandery Road) – Tewkesbury	Eastern terminus of A38 concurrency
Worcestershire	Worcester	55.1	88.7	A38 north to A449 – Bromsgrove, Kidderminster	Information signed westbound only; western terminus of A38 concurrency
Worcestershire	Worcester	55.5– 55.6	89.3– 89.5	A449 north (Croft Road) to A38 – Bromsgrove, Kidderminster	Eastern terminus of A449 concurrency
Worcestershire	Worcester	55.7– 55.9	89.6– 90.0	A449 south (Bromwich Road) to A38 – Malvern, Ledbury, Tewkesbury A443 north-west (Hylton Road) – Tenbury	Ledbury signed westbound only; western terminus of A449 concurrency; south-eastern terminus of A443
Worcestershire	Rushwick	57.5	92.5	A4103 west / Grove Way (A4440 east) to M5 / A422 – Hereford, Evesham, Stratford	Eastern terminus of A4103; western terminus of A4440
Herefordshire	Bromyard	69.7	112.2	A465 west (Hereford Road) – Hereford	Eastern terminus of A465
Herefordshire	Leominster	80.1	128.9	A49 south – Hereford	Eastern terminus of A49 concurrency
Herefordshire	Kimbolton	80.9	130.2	A49 north – Shrewsbury, Ludlow	Ludlow signed eastbound only; western terminus of A49 concurrency
Herefordshire	Monkland and Stretford	85.5	137.6	A4110 to A4113 – Hereford, Canon Pyon, Knighton, Kingsland	Brief concurrency
Herefordshire	Eardisland	86.1	138.6	A4112 south-west to A438 – Brecon, Dilwyn, Weobley	North-eastern terminus of A4112
Herefordshire	Lyonshall	93.1	149.8	A480 south-east – Hereford, Lyonshall	North-western terminus of A480
Herefordshire	Lyonshall	94.9	152.7	A4111 south / Headbrook to A438 – Hereford, Brecon, Kington, Eardisley	Northern terminus of A4111
Herefordshire–Powys boundary	Lower Harpton–Old Radnor boundary	97.8	157.4	England–Wales boundary	
Powys	New Radnor	105.3	169.5	A481 west – Hundred House, Builth Wells	Eastern terminus of A481
Powys	Penybont	110.9	178.5	A488 north – Knighton	Southern terminus of A488
Powys	Crossgates	112.8	181.5	A483 – Llandrindod Wells, Newtown, Llanddewi	Llanddewi signed eastbound only
Powys	Rhayader	120.9	194.6	A470 south (South Street) / B4518 (West Street) – Builth Wells	Eastern terminus of A470 concurrency
Powys	Llangurig	130.0	209.2	A470 north to A489 – Dolgellau, Newtown	Western terminus of A470 concurrency
Ceredigion	Ponterwyd	142.6	229.5	A4120 west – Devil's Bridge	Eastern terminus of A4120
Ceredigion	Llanbadarn Fawr	153.3	246.7	A4120 east (Heol-y-Bont) to A487 – Southgate, Cardigan	Western terminus of A4120
Ceredigion	Aberystwyth	154.3	248.3	A487 (Penglais Road) – Cardigan, Machynlleth	Western terminus
1.000 mi = 1.609 km; 1.000 km = 0.621 mi: Concurrency terminus

== See also ==
- Trunk roads in Wales
