= King's Pyon =

Village in Herefordshire, England

Coordinates: 52.1519°N 2.8228°W

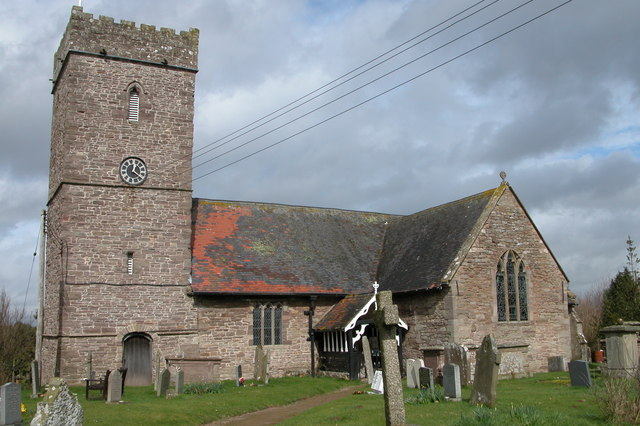
- St Mary's Church

- Location within Herefordshire
- OS grid reference: SO437507
  - London: 125 mi (201 km) SE
- Unitary authority: Herefordshire
- Ceremonial county: Herefordshire
- Region: West Midlands
- Country: England
- Sovereign state: United Kingdom
- Post town: Hereford
- Postcode district: HR4
- Dialling code: 01568
- Police: West Mercia
- Fire: Hereford and Worcester
- Ambulance: West Midlands
- UK Parliament: North Herefordshire
- Website: pyonsgroupparishcouncil.gov.uk

King's Pyon is a village and civil parish in the county of Herefordshire, England, and is approximately 8 miles (13 km) north-west from the city and county town of Hereford. The closest large town is the market town of Leominster, 6 miles (10 km) to the north-west. The parish includes the Grade I listed church of St Mary the Virgin.

== History ==
The 'King's' affix in the name refers to royal ownership of the manor. Listed in the Domesday Book, at the time of the Norman Conquest King's Pyon was in the Hundred of Stretford in the county of Herefordshire. The manor had assets of 18 households, eight villagers, three smallholders (middle level of serf below a villager), four slaves, a priest, and two further people. The area of land under plough was defined by two lord's and nine men's plough teams. In 1066 King Edward held the lordship, which passed in 1086 between the St Mary's abbey of Cormeilles, Gruffydd, and Roger de Lacy who was also tenant-in-chief to king William I.

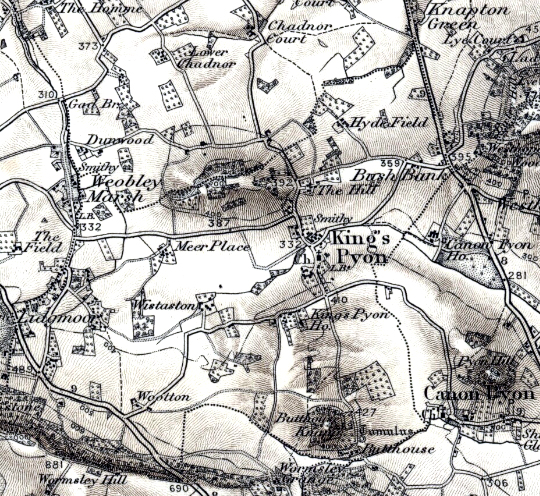
King's Pyon in 1898

In 1909 King's Pyon is described as a village and parish and as being 6 miles (10 km) south-east from Moorhampton station on the Hay and Brecon section of the Midland Railway. It was in the northern division of Herefordshire and in the Stretford hundred. The parish came under the Weobley Union—poor relief and joint workhouse provision set up under the Poor Law Amendment Act 1834—and the petty sessional division and county court district of Hereford. It was in the rural deanery of Weobley and the archdeaconry and Diocese of Hereford. The church is described as being in Norman and Early English styles, with a tower of five bells and the chancel chapel, connected with the manor of Hydefield, containing "an ancient altar-tomb" with two recumbent figures of a knight with his lady from the time of Edward III. The 1878 carved oak reredos and the 1872 north transept were memorials: the first to Thomas Cooke of Brooke House; the second to Rev John Birch Webb-Peploe (died 1869), the vicar of the parish for 40 years. Two fonts were mentioned: one "ancient", of stone; the other of 1879 with a carved oak cover. The east window was dedicated to William Cooke and his wife, Margaret, of Brooke House. The church, which sat 275 people and had a register dating to 1538, was restored in 1876 at a cost of £1,600. The living was a vicarage, an office supported by tithes and glebe, to which was added that at Birley which amounted to 16 acres (6 ha) of glebe—an area of land used to support a parish priest—and a residence in the gift of Sir Joseph Verdin, 1st Baronet of Garnstone Castle (Weobley), who was one of the chief landowners. A charitable endowment of 1670 left £3 yearly for the education of poor children, and one of 1673, 10 shillings for distribution to poor people at Christmas. These endowments were overseen by the Garnstone estate and paid through the school managers. A further endowment was that of 1675 for 34 shillings through receipts from land holdings, paid yearly to the churchwarden and vicar of King's Pyon for the benefit of the poor of the parish. In 1878 interest from an invested £100 was instituted to provide coal for the poor, while another endowment interest from a £100 investment went to the churchwarden and vicar to support the Sunday school.

Parish land of 2,404 acres (973 ha) was "clayey" and of gravel, on which were grown wheat, beans, peas, barley, hops and apples. Parish population in 1901 was 439. "Lidgmoor" (Ledgemoor) was a hamlet in which was a mission chapel and a Primitive Methodist chapel. The parish post office mail was delivered by foot and processed through Weobley which was the nearest money order and telegraph office. There was a mixed Public Elementary School with an attached schoolmistress's house which were built in 1879; the school held 100 pupils and in 1909 had an average attendance of 75. The vicar and the local Justice of the Peace lived in the parish. Commercial trades and occupations included ten farmers, three of whom were also hop growers, a post mistress who was also a shopkeeper, three further shopkeepers, a blacksmith, a wheelwright, a beer retailer, a gamekeeper, a pump maker, and an insurance agent. A carrier—transporter of trade goods, with sometimes people, between different settlements—operated on Wednesdays and Saturdays between the parish and Hereford, and on Fridays, Leominster.

== Geography ==
King's Pyon is approximately 1.75 miles (3 km) from north-west to south-east and 3 miles (5 km) south-west to north-east, and covers an area of 9.78 square kilometres (978 ha). Adjacent parishes are Dilwyn at the north, Weobley at the west, Birley with Upper Hill at the north-east, Canon Pyon at the south-east, and Brinsop and Wormsley at the south. The parish is rural, of farms, fields, managed woodland and coppices, water courses, isolated and dispersed businesses, residential properties, the small village of King's Pyon, and the larger settlement of Ledgemoor at the south-west on Ledgemoor Lane. The only major route is the A4110 Hereford to Leintwardine road, which forms the boundary with Birley with Upper Hill. All other routes are minor roads, country lanes, bridleways, farm tracks and footpaths. A stream, draining the southern higher land of the parish, skirts the north of King's Pyon hamlet and flows east to west through the centre of the parish as a tributary to the River Lugg 5 miles (8 km) to the east. A further stream at Ledgemoor, at the boundary with Weobley, flows north eventually feeding the Stretford Brook and River Arrow.

== Governance ==
King's Pyon is represented in the lowest tier of UK governance by four members on the eleven-member Pyons Group Parish Council, which also includes the parish of Canon Pyon and other settlements in the two parishes. As Herefordshire is a unitary authority—no district council between parish and county councils—the parish sends one councillor, representing the Weobley Ward, to Herefordshire County Council. King's Pyon is represented in the UK Parliament as part of the North Herefordshire constituency.

In 1974 King's Pyon became part of the now defunct Leominster District of the county of Hereford and Worcester, instituted under the Local Government Act 1972. In 2002 the parish, with the parishes of Bishopstone, Bridge Sollers, Brinsop and Wormsley, Byford, Canon Pyon, Dinmore, Mansell Gamage, Mansell Lacy, and Wellington and Yazor, was reassessed as part of Wormsley Ridge Ward which elected one councillor to Herefordshire district council.

== Community ==
Parish population was 294 in 2001, and 274 in 2011.

No bus routes run through the parish. The closest bus stops are on the A4110 road at the very north of the parish and Canon Pyon village at the south-east, with connections between Hereford and Leominster, and between Hereford and Bucknell in Shropshire. At Woebley village, to the west from Ledgemoor, are stops with connections between Hereford and Llandrindod in Wales. The closest rail connections are at Leominster railway station, 6.5 miles (10 km) to the north-east, and Hereford 5 miles (8 km) to the south-east, both on the Crewe to Newport Welsh Marches Line. The nearest hospital is Leominster Community Hospital at Leominster, with the nearest major hospital Hereford County Hospital at Hereford.

The nearest primary schools are Weobley Primary School and Canon Pyon CE Primary School; the nearest secondary, the mixed Weobley High School. There are two public houses: The Marshpools at Ledgemoor, and The Bush at the extreme north-east of the parish in the hamlet of Bush Bank on the A4110 road at the border with Birley with Upper Hill. Within the parish is a chimney and fireplace installation business, and, at Ledgemoor, a marquee hire company. At the parish boundary, and just within the adjacent parish of Brinsop and Wormsley is Herefordshire Golf Club.

The Anglican parish church of St Mary the Virgin at King's Pyron village is in the Deanery of Leominster in the Diocese of Hereford. There is also a mission room in the same deanery and diocese at Ledgemoor.

== Landmarks ==
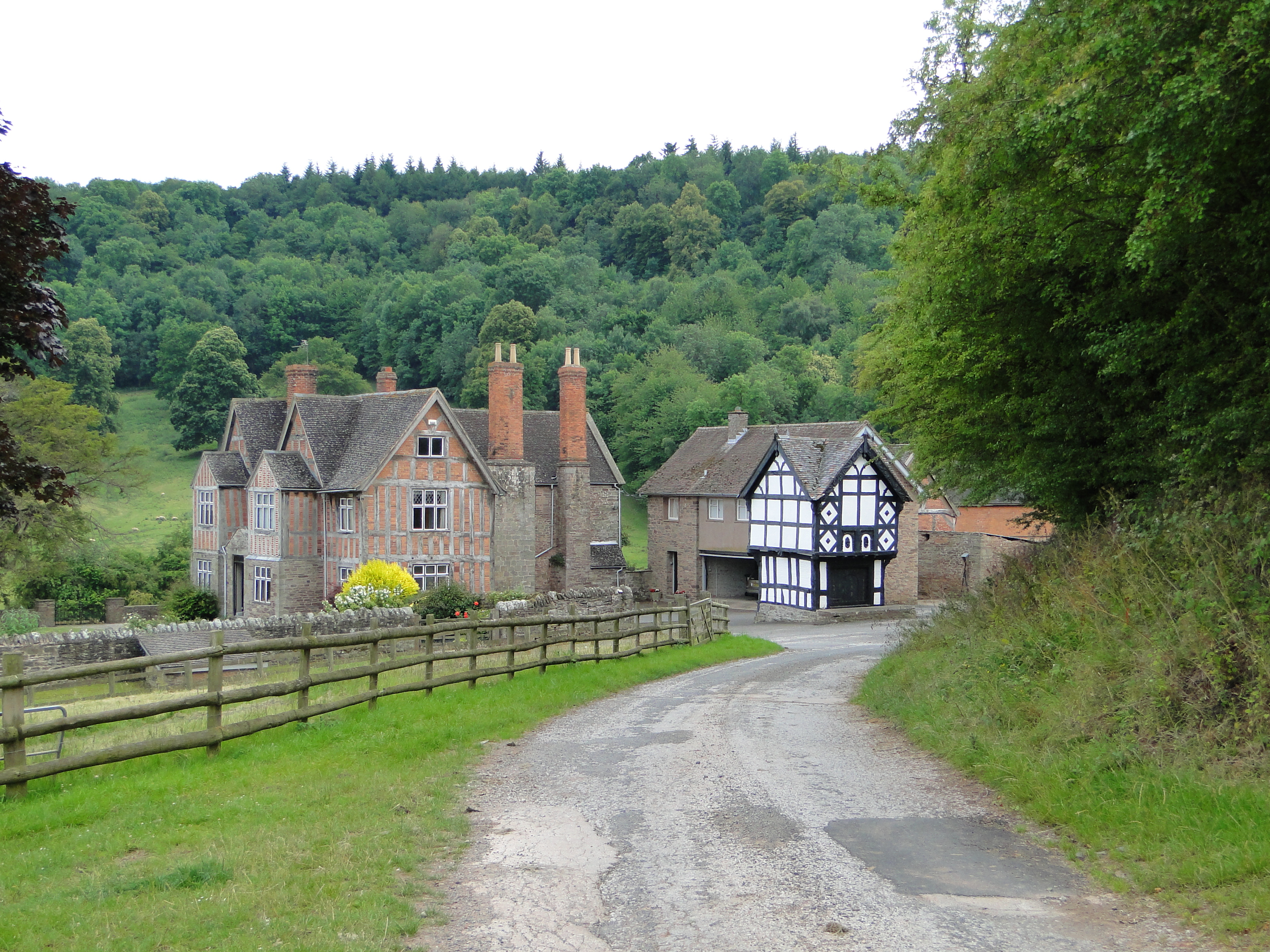
Butthouse (left) and gatehouse

There is one Grade I, two Grade II*, and 17 Grade II listed buildings in King's Pyon, some also one of 17 listed ancient monuments.

The Grade I sandstone parish church of St Mary, within the village dates to the 12th century with later changes and an 1872 restoration. It is of cruciform plan and comprises a two-bay chancel, a four-bay nave with a 12th-century blocked doorway, a three-stage tower with battlemented parapet, and north and south face opposing clocks. The tower's central south doorway possibly dates to the 17th or 18th century. A gabled probably 20th-century porch is at the south of the nave, and a vestry is on the north side of the chancel. The north transept with pine roof is 19th century. The east end of the nave shows evidence of an earlier chancel roof. The chancel arch is 12th century. The chancel south wall incorporates a piscina with drain and priest door. In the north wall of the chancel is a door to the vestry in which is a 1732 wall monument of white marble, and a 19th-century cast iron parish chest embossed with the letters "Coalbrookdale". A chest tomb supports effigies of an armoured man lying beside a woman. Chancel wall monuments date from the 18th to mid-19th-century. The stained glass east window shows the Nativity, Crucifixion and Ascension, below which is a panelled oak reredos and a mid-19th-century altar rail. Fixtures and fittings include two fonts, one with a cylindrical bowl which possibly dates to the 15th century, a late 19th-century decorative cast iron heater and 20th-century bronze-finished lamps hanging from chains in each of the transepts, an oak lectern, a reading desk and a pulpit, and 19th-century pine pews.

The Grade II* Black Hall, today in a farm yard at the south of the village, is a house possibly dating to the 15th century, with changes at c.17th. It is L-plan and of timber framing with infills of plaster and red brick on a sandstone plinth. The roof is tiled and hipped. The eastern two bays are of a former medieval hall house to which two ranges were appended in the early 17th century.

Butthouse, at the south of the parish and Grade II listed, is a house dating to the early 17th century with later changes. It is L-plan, gabled, of timber framing with brick nogging (infill), and of two storeys with attics, and with external sandstone chimney stacks at the north. The east garden front has projecting two-storey gables. To the north-west of Butthouse is a gatehouse, of square plan, timber framed with plaster infill, and a cross-gabled tiled roof. Of two storeys, the first is jettied over the ground floor.
