= Pen-y-Bont =

Pen-y-Bont is the Welsh for "bridgehead", and may refer to:

- Pen-y-bont, an area at the edge of Llyn Tegid in Snowdonia where the River Dee leaves the lake
- Bridgend, a town in south Wales with the Welsh name Pen-y-bont ar Ogwr
  - Penybont F.C., a football club based in Bridgend
  - Pen-y-bont Bro Morgannwg, a Senedd constituency covering Bridgend and the Vale of Glamorgan
- Penybont, a village in the Ithon valley in Powys, Wales
  - Pen-y-Bont railway station, a station serving Penybont village
  - Penybont United F.C., a football club based in Penybont
- Pen-y-bont Llanerch Emrys, a hamlet in the Tanat Valley, Powys, Wales
- Pen-y-Bont-Fawr, in Powys, Wales, a village in the Tanat Valley near to Llangynog
