= Monkland, Herefordshire =

Village in Herefordshire, England

Coordinates: 52.2145°N 2.7924°W

Monkland
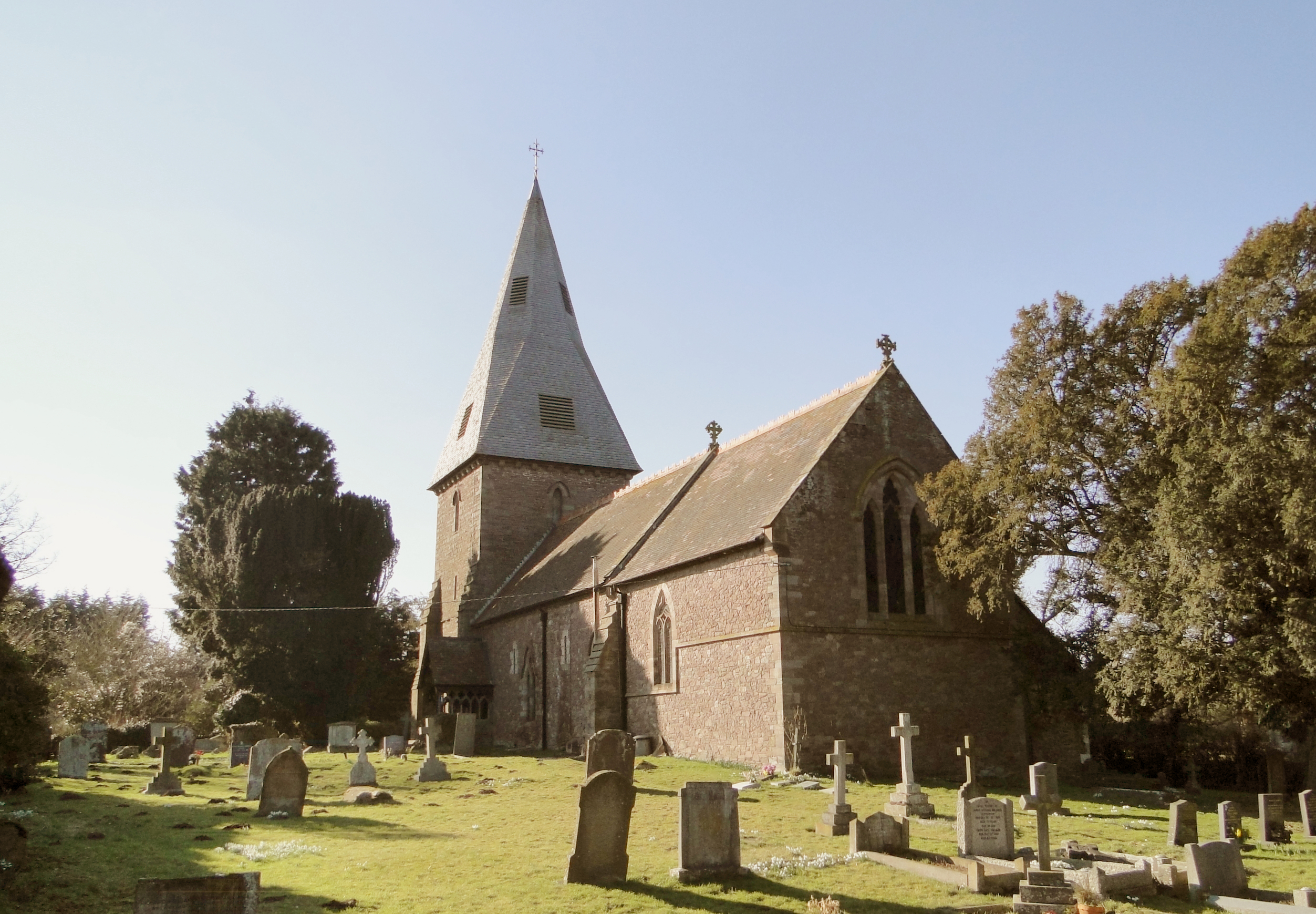
- All Saints, Monkland

- Location within Herefordshire
- Civil parish: Monkland and Stretford
- Unitary authority: County of Herefordshire
- Ceremonial county: Herefordshire
- Region: West Midlands
- Country: England
- Sovereign state: United Kingdom
- Post town: Leominster
- Postcode district: HR6
- Police: West Mercia
- Fire: Hereford and Worcester
- Ambulance: West Midlands
- UK Parliament: North Herefordshire

Monkland is a small village in the parish of Monkland and Stretford, in Herefordshire, England, about three miles (5 km) west of Leominster.

== Origin of the name ==
In Domesday the site is identifiable as Lena and also Leine. Early versions of the name develop into Monklene or "low-lying land of the monks" in the Hundred of Hezetre, now Hazeltree. About 1180 the variants Munkelen, Moneclene and Monkeslane are found. Some sources have the erroneous Monkllan which is Anglo-Welsh for "Monk's Church."

== Geography ==
The River Arrow runs to the east of the village.

== History ==
Raoul/Ralph de Tosni was born in 1037, and died in 1102 as Seneschal de Conches in Normandy; the family also held Tosny, 30 miles from Conches. Ralph was to have been standard-bearer to William the Conqueror at the Battle of Hastings but gave the honour to his younger brother Robert. Different genealogical sources do differ, especially as there were three close relatives named Robert. After the conquest, Ralph gained some 65 manors across England in Norfolk, Worcs, Herefordshire etc. The tax for the mill at Monkland was 11 shillings and 25 ‘sticks’of eels, each ‘stick’ being 25 eels. The village was valued at £7. Before the conquest, Aelmer and Ulfketel held it as two manors; ‘they could go where they would’ – an extra and not frequent piece of Domesday detail.

Monkland, the mill and its 22 residents was transferred by him to the Abbey of St Pierre and St Paul de Castillon at Conches. The town of Conches had its name changed from Castillon by his father Raoul ‘The Spaniard’ after his pilgrimage to Santiago de Compostela and his wife's miraculous cure on the journey.

Ralph's wife, Isabel, the daughter of Simon I de Montfort, rode as a knight in north France and lived to the age of 90. Tracing back to 924, Ralph's descendants remained well in royal favour until only a sister survived in 1309. Brother Robert, the standard-bearer, held 131 manors from King William – scattered somewhat as was William's method – and was based at Stafford where he built the castle in 1066 as Castellan. His son became Baron then much later Earl of Stafford. The Earldom is extinct.

The Benedictine cell at Monkland was linked with the equally small cell at Wotton Waven cell in Warwickshire. These passed, to and fro by result of war, to the Crown and to Conches more than once. In 1415, Henry V gave it to Sir Rowland Lenthall who had distinguished himself at Agincourt. After 50 years, it was resumed by the Crown and then the Manor and Priory were granted with tithes to the Dean of the Canons of St George's Chapel, Windsor. They are still vow-patrons of the benefice and relations continue, mostly via the Diocese. In 1831 the Manor was sold to a Mr Preece of Leominster; this solicitor passed it to the Bengough family of Gloucestershire in 1835, who still live in the village. Manor Farm remains, the manor itself does not.

The two parish books ‘from 1730 to 1817’ and ‘1817 to Now’ are a wonderful record of the churchwardens, poorhouse, petty constables and waywardens. In 1890, the parish was listed as of 1079 acres – about 1.7 sq. miles with a population of 211 in 48 houses. The numbers are as yet little changed although there is some growth. In the most recent state as the Civil Parish of Monkland and Stretford, its major boundary is the River Arrow to north and east.

The village lies off the A44 and is the start of the Black and White Village Trail. It has two notable buildings - one in Monkland and one in Stretford. All Saints' Church, Monkland is Grade II* listed while St Cosmas and St Damian's Church, Stretford is Grade I listed.

Monkland is a former civil parish. In 1961 the parish had a population of 169. On 1 April 1987 the parish was abolished and merged with Stretford to form "Monkland & Stretford".

== All Saints church ==
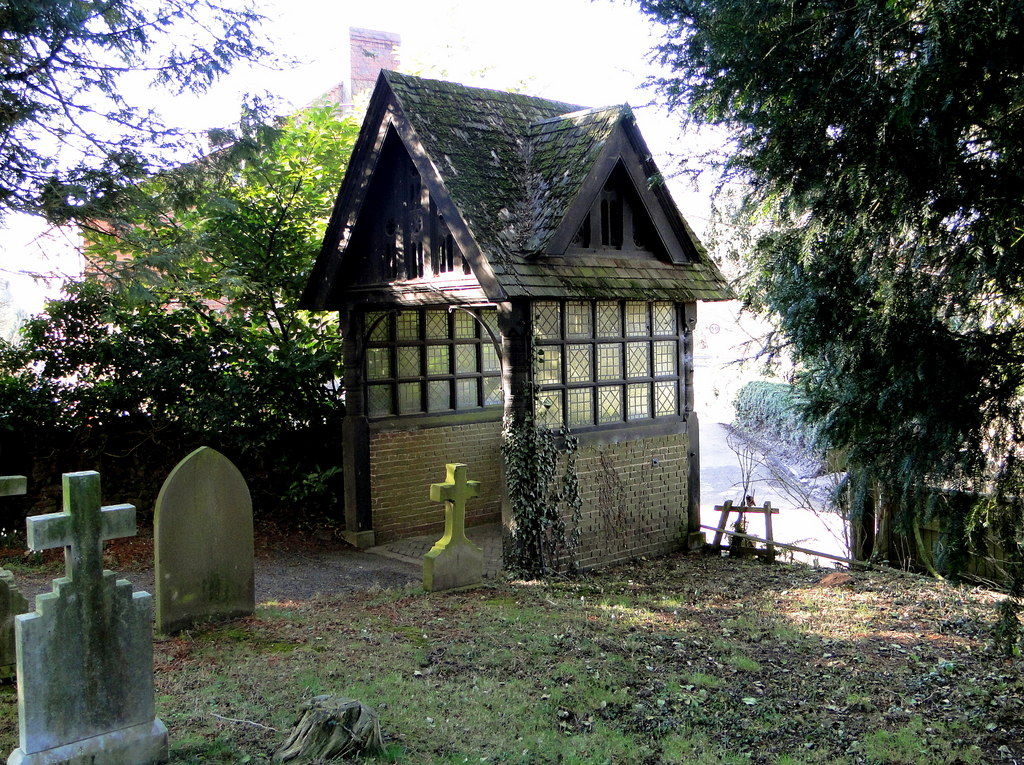
Lychgate

The church dates from circa 1100, therefore being of Norman origin. It was built by the monks from the Abbey of Conches in Normandy. Pevsner writes that the church is of 13th century construction and was thoroughly restored and rebuilt in 1866 by G. E. Street. Street later worked on the Law Courts as well as York, Salisbury and Carlisle cathedrals. The 1866 work was in part a rebuild rather than the all-too-common demolish-and-newbuild.

A small cell of Benedictine monks was founded at the church by Ralph de Tosni, Seneschal de Conches in Normandy where there was the Abbey of St Pierre and St Paul de Castillon. The monastic buildings were probably on the south side of the churchyard. This was the site of the old Manor House of which deteriorating outbuildings remain. The large-scale 1880/90 Ordnance Survey maps have some useful extra detail.

Windows from the 12th, 13th and 14th century were moved and reset by Street. The stone is local and with dressings of tufa around the door and most of the windows. The Nave and font have been dated to about 1100; the tower, south porch and door, also the large nave windows have been dated to about 1270.

The tower is 13th-century of three stages with a corbelled cornice and a shingled timber broach spire. The second stage has lancets with labels, the first stage a square-headed window in each wall. The fame of the church derives from it being where Sir Henry Williams Baker was from 1852 to 1877. It was here that he worked as Chairman of the Committee of Compilers for Hymns Ancient and Modern.

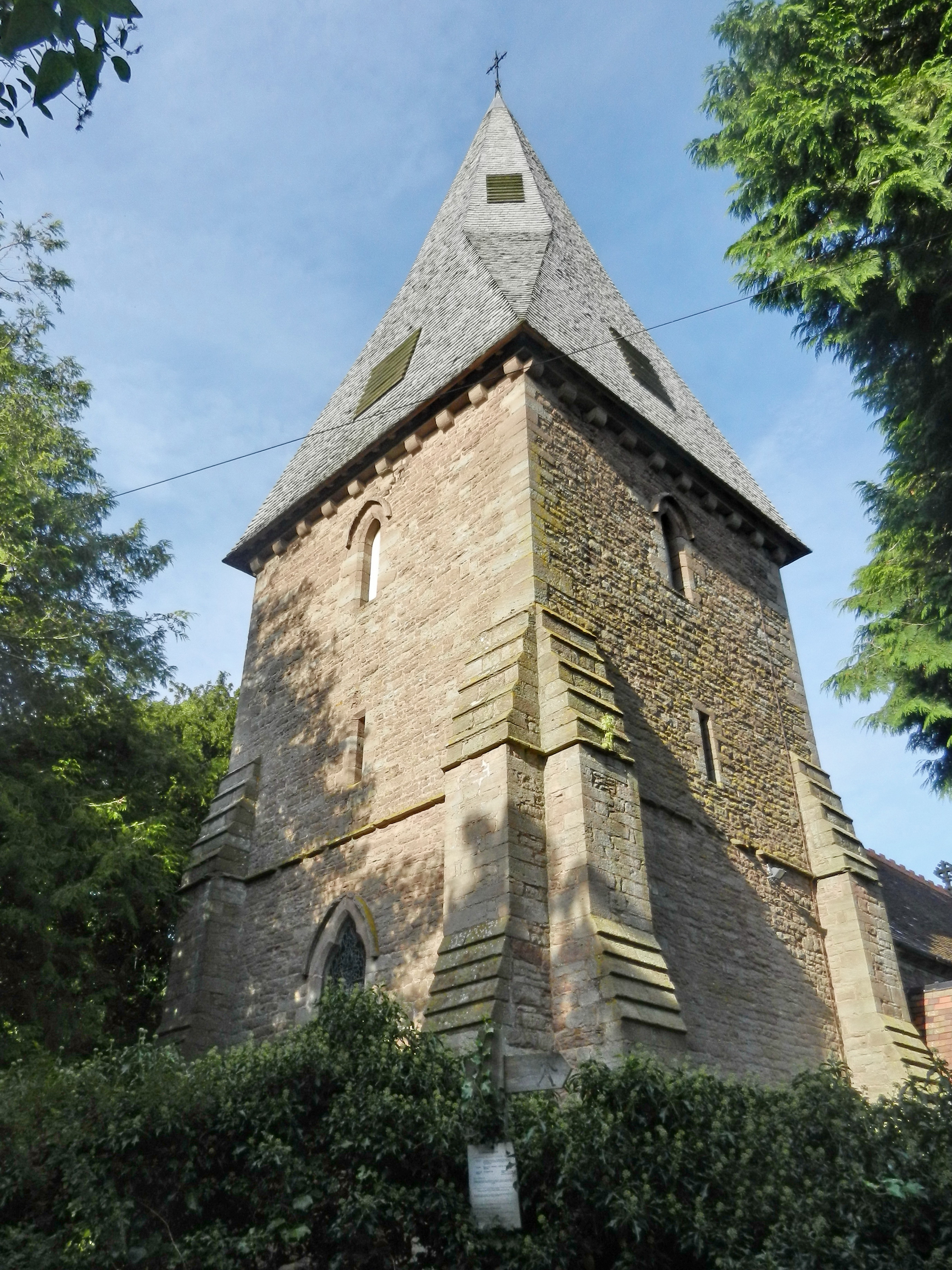
The tower

The restoration of the Nave by Street involved demolishing the walls and re-building with the same stones in their former position – so that in effect it is as it was when built in the 13thC. The first incumbent, Ralph de la Forde is listed from 1289 and his successors on the south wall of the Nave. The Chancel was the gift of Sir Henry and replaced an older 1830 structure. Sir Henry also paid for the shingled spire to be added to the tower

The East window glass is the gift in 1865 of the proprietors of Hymns Ancient and Modern – Baker's colleagues on the committee – and depicts Our Lord in Glory with angels above and a very happy group of earthly singers in a garden singing from a book; on the two side windows, angels, then saints singing and herdsmen below playing a horn and a recorder. The glass is by John Hardman Powell of Birmingham.

As well as the Organ, much of the church is adorned with gifts from Sir Henry or memorials to him. The reredos is a crucifix sculptured in alabaster under a canopy of Purbeck marble; the figures are the Virgin Mary and ‘the other Mary’ on the north side with St John and St Mary Magdalene on the south while the background is Salviati's mosaic. As with much else, Rev Baker aimed towards the Tractarian high-church style.

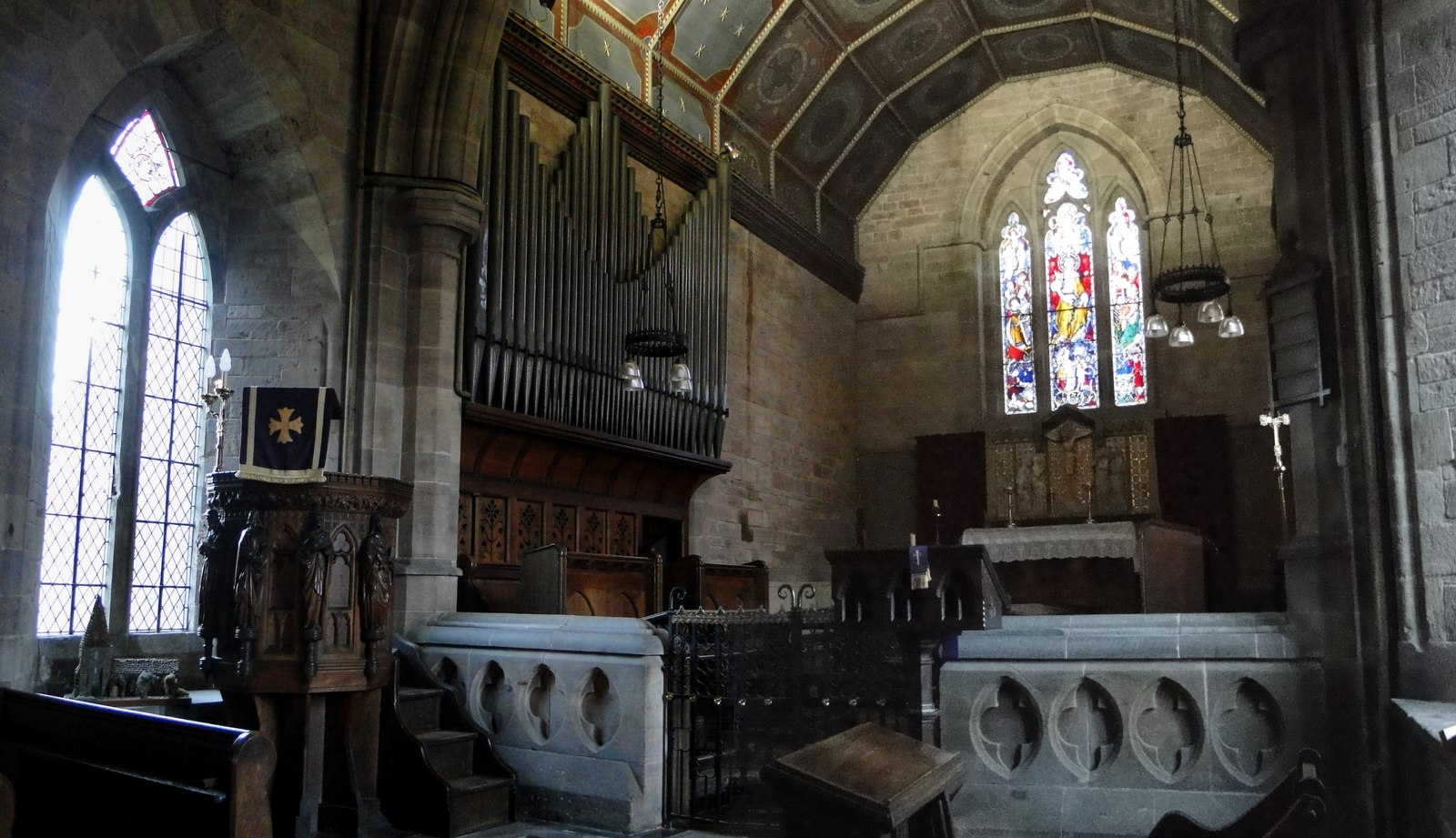
Chancel and East window

The fine Pulpit is the gift of Sir Henry's sister, Jessy. The figures are the four great Latin Doctors: Saints ambrose, Jerome, Augustine of Hippo and Gregory the Great.

By the time of Sir Henry Williams Baker's death in 1877, sales of Hymns Ancient and Modern had reached some 8 million, and the government had even issued copies to every ship in the Royal Navy. His obituary included "...the beautifully restored church, the excellent choir, the crowded services and the efficient school bear witness to his zeal and devotion", and "...His true memorial will be found in the work Hymns Ancient and Modern", in particular the hymn "Let us with a gladsome mind" whose tune, "Monkland", was written by John Bernard Wilkes from a tune by John Antes.
