= Camddwr =

River in Wales

For the tributary of the River Wye, see Camddwr, Wye and for the tributary of the River Teifi, see Camddwr, Teifi.

The Camddwr is a significant right-bank tributary of the River Towy in the eastern part of Ceredigion, mid Wales. It rises on the undulating plateau east of Garn Gron (52.2253°N 3.8247°W) and flows in a generally south-southeasterly direction into Llyn Brianne, a reservoir formed by the damming of the upper Towy, (52.1574°N 3.7656°W). A chapel at Soar y mynydd beside the river is often mentioned as being the most isolated in Wales.
