= Llanbadarn Fawr, Powys =

Llanbadarn Fawr
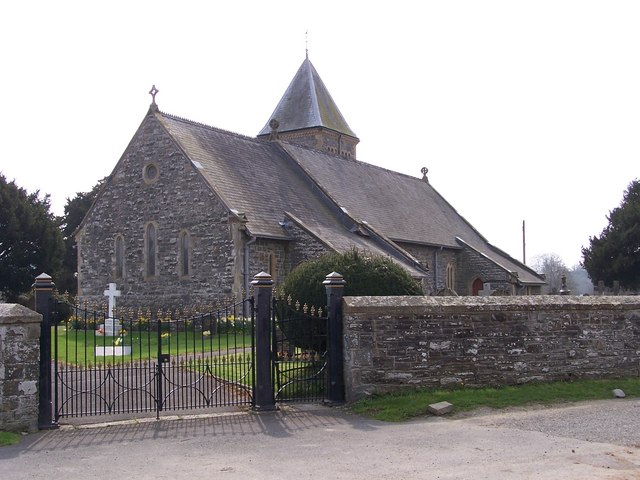
- Llanbadarn Fawr Church
- Population: 701 (2011)
- OS grid reference: SO096643
- Principal area: Powys
- Preserved county: Powys
- Country: Wales
- Sovereign state: United Kingdom
- Post town: LLANDRINDOD WELLS
- Postcode district: LD1
- Dialling code: 01597
- Police: Dyfed-Powys
- Fire: Mid and West Wales
- Ambulance: Welsh
- UK Parliament: Brecon, Radnor and Cwm Tawe
- Senedd Cymru – Welsh Parliament: Brecon and Radnorshire
- List of places UK Wales Powys 52.269766°N 3.325470°W Map of the community

Llanbadarn Fawr is a community in Powys, within the historic boundaries of Radnorshire, mid Wales. Consisting of a tract of undulating land directly north east of Llandrindod Wells, the community consists of the settlements of Crossgates and Fron and in 2001 had a population of 654, increasing to 701 at the 2011 Census. The community name comes from the local church.

== History ==
Llanbadarn Fawr was once a parish, much larger than its present-day community. In John Marius Wilson's Imperial Gazetteer of England and Wales published in the 1870s, he states that "Llanbadarn Fawr", a parish in Rhayader district, Radnor; ... is divided into the townships of Brinhyfedd and Cellws; and it contains the village of Penybont". Today the village of Penybont lies outside the local council jurisdiction of Llanbadarn Fawr being a community in its own right.

The River Ithon flows through the community, passing the village of Crossgates. The community is served by Pen-y-Bont railway station which is closer to the villages of Fron and Crossgate than its namesake Penybont.

== Governance ==
An electoral ward with the same name exists. This ward includes Penybont and at the 2011 census had a population of 1,129.

== Buildings of note ==
The most notable building in the community is Llanbadarn Fawr church. The River Ithon flows a hundred metres from the church, and this fact, along with the addition of the affix "fawr" to distinguish it from nearby Llanbadarn Fynydd, has led one authority to state that the church may be pre-Norman Conquest and the mother church of the area. The earliest mention of the church is in 1304, and the name Llanbadarn Vaur appeared in texts in 1374. The church name translates as the Great Church of Saint Padarn, after who the church is dedicated. The church, like many in the area, was rebuilt during the Victorian Era. The architect who carried out the restoration was S. W. Williams of Rhayader, described as having "built at least five rather ugly churches ... in Radnorshire". Despite this, the Romanesque tympanum above the south door remains, one of only two in Wales. The carving depicts a lion and lioness facing each other either side of a tree with a cat head and sun beneath them. The porch also contains an inscribed centurial stone, dated 1171, from a Roman fort at Castell Collen. The church is also significant for containing a figure described by historian Malcolm Thurlby as a Sheela Na Gig. In 1176 Geraldus Cambrensis, the archdeacon of Brecon, sought sanctuary in the church.

In Fron is Coedgwgan Hall, a grade II listed building. Originally dated as a 16th-century manor house, the hall was rebuilt in the 19th century though the lateral chimney, dated as 1581, still exists in part.
