= Fron, Powys =

Coordinates: 52.282°N 3.336°W

Fron
- Location within Powys
- OS grid reference: SO089656
- Community: Llanbadarn Fawr, Powys
- Principal area: Powys
- Preserved county: Powys
- Country: Wales
- Sovereign state: United Kingdom
- Post town: LLANDRINDOD WELLS
- Postcode district: LD1
- Dialling code: 01597
- Police: Dyfed-Powys
- Fire: Mid and West Wales
- Ambulance: Welsh
- UK Parliament: Brecon, Radnor and Cwm Tawe
- Senedd Cymru – Welsh Parliament: Brecon and Radnorshire

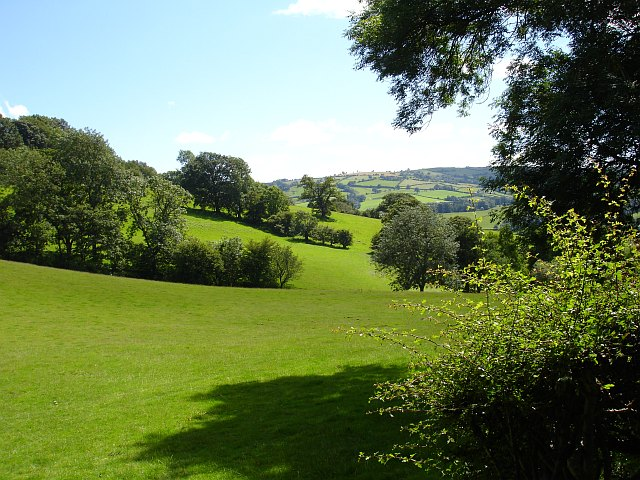
The northern slopes of Fron Hydan

Fron is a small village in Powys, Wales, within the community of Llanbadarn Fawr. Fron lies northeast of Llandrindod Wells and east of Clywedog Brook, which flows into the River Ithon.

Fron is served by Pen-y-Bont railway station.
