= Birley with Upper Hill =

Civil parish in Herefordshire, England

Coordinates: 52.176°N 2.786°W

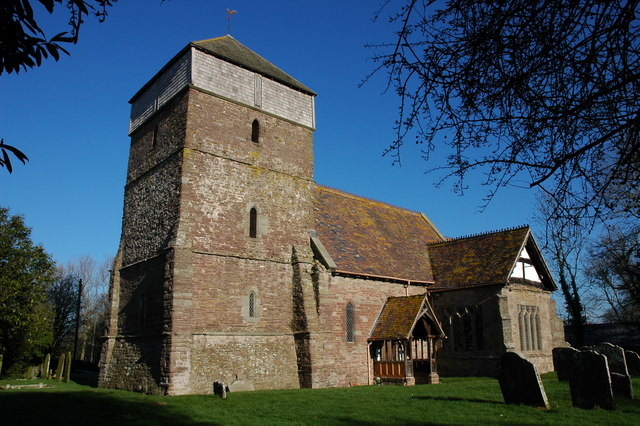
- Birley church

- Location within Herefordshire
- Population: 339 (2011 census)
- Civil parish: Birley with Upper Hill
- Unitary authority: County of Herefordshire
- Ceremonial county: Herefordshire
- Region: West Midlands
- Country: England
- Sovereign state: United Kingdom

Birley with Upper Hill is a civil parish in Herefordshire, England, consisting of the small villages of Birley and Upper Hill, and most of the hamlet of Bush Bank. According to the 2001 census, it had a population of 321, increasing to 339 at the 2011 census. The parish was formed on 1 April 1987 from parts of "Birley", Canon Pyon, Hope under Dinmore and King's Pyon.

The Grade I listed church of St Peter dates back to the 12th century, and was the subject of restoration work in 2004, funded by the Heritage Lottery Fund. It is on Historic England's list of buildings at risk.
