= Weobley High School =

Location
- Burton Wood; Weobley; Herefordshire, HR4 8ST; England; 52.1557°N 2.8695°W

Information
- Type: Community school
- Local authority: Herefordshire
- Department for Education URN: 116952 Tables
- Ofsted: Reports
- Head Teacher: Weston Holder
- Gender: Mixed
- Age: 11 to 16
- Enrolment: 521as of August 2021
- Capacity: 525
- Website: weobleyhigh.co.uk

Weobley High School is a mixed secondary school located in Weobley in the English county of Herefordshire.

It is a community school administered by Herefordshire Council, and mainly admits pupils from Canon Pyon, Credenhill, Dilwyn, Staunton on Wye and Weobley. It is a small rural school.

The school offers GCSEs and BTECs as programmes of study for pupils.

Longest serving staff member Mrs angela price who has been at the school for 34 years since September 1992

== History ==
The school was established in 1963 as Weobley County Secondary School. In 1970 the school had 251 pupils.

== School performance and inspection judgements ==
- 2004: Inspection by Ofsted judged that the school was Inadequate and that Special Measures were necessary to improve it.
- 2005: Inspection judged the school Satisfactory.
- 2008: Inspection again judged the school Satisfactory.
- 2011: The school was judged Outstanding.
- 2013: The school was judged Good.
- 2017: The school was judged Good.
- 2023: The school was judged Good.

As of 2024, the most recent inspection was in 2023.
