= Ilar Thomas =

Welsh Anglican priest (1930–2011)

Ilar Roy Luther Thomas (1930–2011) was a Welsh Anglican priest in the 20th century, the archdeacon of Brecon from 1990 to 1995.

Thomas was educated at St David's College, Lampeter and ordained in 1954. After curacies at Oystermouth and Gorseinon he held incumbencies at Llanbadarn, Knighton and Sketty. He was also a Chaplain in the Army Cadet Force from 1962 to 1990; Treasurer of Brecon Cathedral from 1987 to 1988; and its chancellor from 1988 to 1990.
