= Crossgates, Powys =

Coordinates: 52.274802°N 3.337317°W

Crossgates: Welsh: Y Groes
- Location within Powys
- Population: 327
- OS grid reference: SO088649
- Community: Llanbadarn Fawr, Powys
- Principal area: Powys
- Preserved county: Powys
- Country: Wales
- Sovereign state: United Kingdom
- Post town: LLANDRINDOD WELLS
- Postcode district: LD1
- Dialling code: 01597
- Police: Dyfed-Powys
- Fire: Mid and West Wales
- Ambulance: Welsh
- UK Parliament: Brecon, Radnor and Cwm Tawe
- Senedd Cymru – Welsh Parliament: Brecon and Radnorshire

Soft drink stall at the Crossgates village fête in Powys, Wales.

Crossgates (Welsh: Y Groes) is a village in Powys, mid Wales, in the historic county of Radnorshire. It is the main settlement of the community of Llanbadarn Fawr, which had a population of 701 in 2011. Crossgates is located three miles northeast of Llandrindod Wells and eight miles southeast of Rhayader, at the point where the A483 and A44 roads intersect. It is notable as the site of a busy service station, and for lending its name to Crossgates Coaches. The population in 2011 was 327 with 47% born in Wales and 48% in England.

== Facilities ==
The village is served by a primary school which opened in 1977, remodelled and extended in 2009 to a capacity of 210. This replaced an earlier school dating from 1872 and which now houses Crossgates Community Centre. The Community Centre is home to WI, Bingo, Zumba, Table Tennis and Bridge Clubs, along with an organisation called Golden Age and the local Community Council, there is also a first Crossgates girl guides and a group who are on a three-year sheep dog trials training programme. The Community Centre has a Consultation Room for hire and a large hall that is also available for hire. There are a number of local shops including a small Nisa shop and cafe. There is a caravan park located on the village's outskirts, along with 2 small b&b's.

Pen-y-Bont railway station is also located in the village, despite being some two miles from Penybont itself.

== Churches ==
The parish church dedicated to St. Padarn (after which Llanbadarn Fawr is named) is situated near the bridge over the River Ithon just south of the village. It contains an important Norman archway and rare carved tympanum, a Roman era centurial stone, a Sheela na gig and Celtic stone carvings. The Rock Baptist Chapel is the earliest baptist foundation in Radnorshire.
