= Llanbadarn Fawr =

Llanbadarn Fawr may relate to the following places in Wales:

- Llanbadarn Fawr, Ceredigion, a village and community in Ceredigion
- Llanbadarn Fawr, Powys, a village and community in Powys
