= Broadward, Herefordshire =

Hamlet in Herefordshire, England

Coordinates: 52.21°N 2.737°W

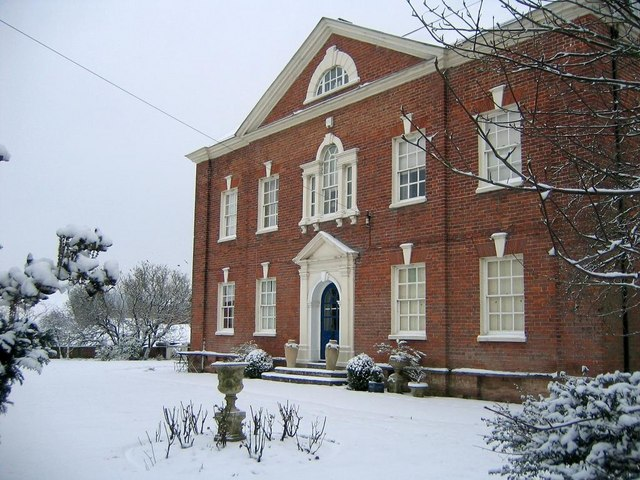
Broadward Hall

Broadward is a hamlet in Herefordshire, England.

It is situated approximately 1 mile (1.6 km) south of the town of Leominster, on the B4361 road (Hereford Road), and is part of the civil parish of Leominster. The town is steadily growing towards Broadward, with Leominster Cemetery and Owen Way just to the north of Broadward.

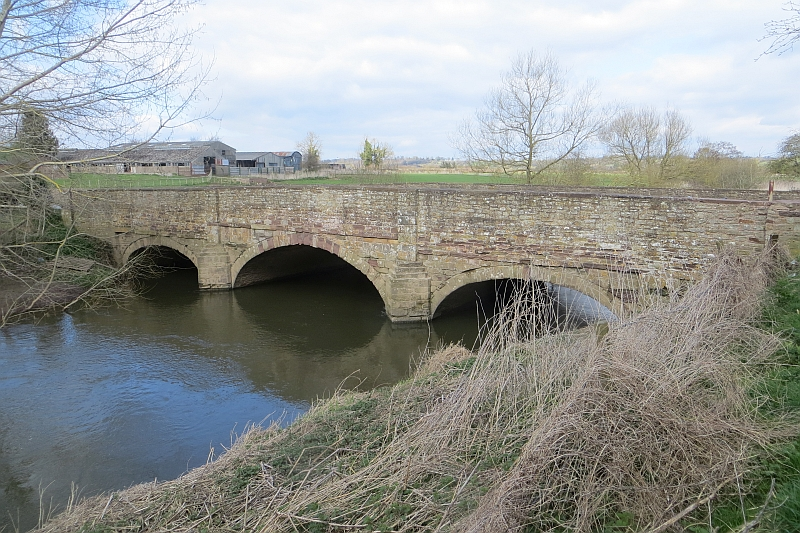
Broadward Bridge

The River Arrow flows to the south of the hamlet and Broadward Bridge takes the road across it.
