= A481 road =

Road in Wales

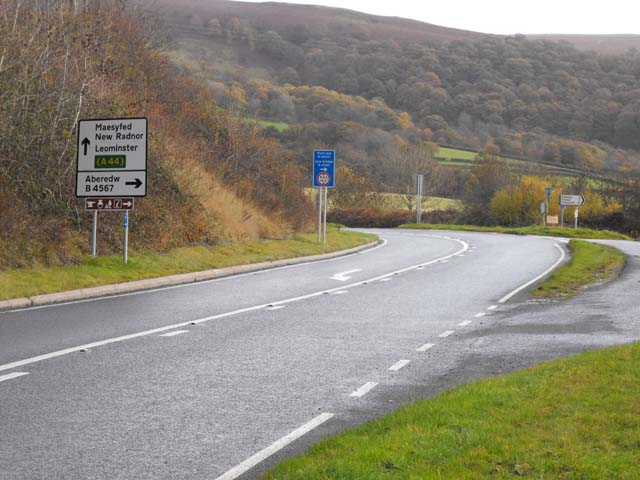
Aberedw junction A481

The A481 is a road in Powys, Wales, which connects with the A483 road, not far from the A470 road at Llanelwedd, Builth Wells and leads to the A44 road near Llanfihangel Nant Melan. It is the main road leading to the A44 which connects Builth to Leominster and Hereford across the border with England.

== Route ==
The A481 is a short, windy hill road about 10 mi (16 km) long orientated from southwest to northeast. Its southwesterly terminus is with the A483 at Llanelwedd, half a mile north of Builth Wells, and just beside the site of the Royal Welsh Showground. The route runs on the north side of the Wye Valley, with the hills of Carneddau and Gilwern Hill to the left and further on, Little Hill and Gwalin-Ceste Hill to the right. At a sharp left bend a mile from Builth Wells, the B4567 branches off to the right, continuing down the left bank of the River Wye, parallel with the A470 on the other bank. The A481 now departs from the River Wye and rises up in the valley formed by a tributary, before descending again to the River Edw. Several unclassified roads fork off to the left, several going to the village of Llansantffraed-in-Elvel and continuing on to Newbridge-on-Wye, crossing the A483 on the way. A pair of unclassified roads which subsequently join fork off to the right at the hamlet of Hundred House. This road continues over the hills through Glascwm to join the B4594 at the village of Gladestry very close to the English border. The northeasterly terminus of the A481 is on a stretch of the A44, the Worcester to Aberystwyth road, halfway between the villages of Llandegley and New Radnor and near to Llanfihangel Nant Melan.
