= Curig =

Saint Curig
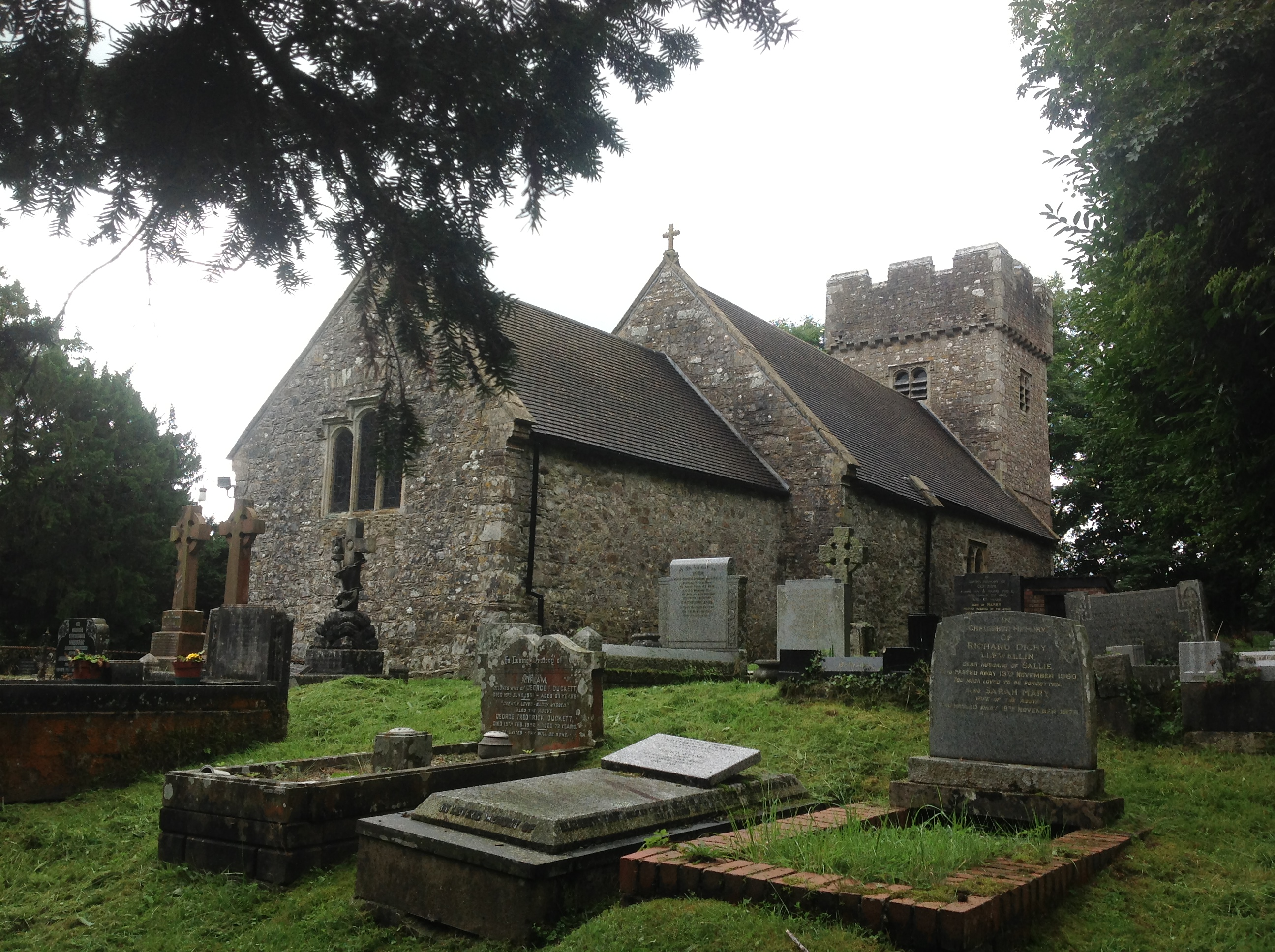
- Chapel of St Ilid & St Curig at Llanilid, Wales

Bishop
- Born: Unknown, estimated at c. 800
- Residence: Llangurig
- Died: Landerneau
- Venerated in: Church in Wales
- Patronage: Capel Curig, Llangurig, Porthkerry, Langstone and Llanilid

St Curig was a Celtic bishop and saint of Wales during post Roman times.

St Curig settled in Wales in the 7th century AD, during the reign of Maelgwn Gwynedd, for whom he was described as being a warrior.

Lore describes Maelgwn becoming angered by his warrior's new-found religious beliefs, and in response Curig "caused Maelgwn and his men to go blind [and forced] three of Maelgwn's sons ... to give Gurig [sic] land."

Upon landing at Aberystwyth, "he travelled inland, and rested upon the summit of a high mountain, where he settled a green, which still bears the name of Eisteddfa Gurig, or Curig's seat." This is the site of the present day village of Llangurig.

In Thomas Jones' Gerald of Wales, St Harmon's Church is described as having (until the late 16th century) a crucifix of St Curig's, "which extends slightly at the top, on both sides, in the shape of a cross, and which is covered round with gold and silver." Jones describes it as being used to cure patients.

He is sometimes associated with Saint Ilid or St Dona. He is remembered in the church of St Curig in Llangurig and the chapels called Capel Curig in Porthkerry, Langstone, Newport and Llanilid, all in Wales. The church of St. Julittas`s in Capel Curig is traditionally said to have been founded by him.

Curig is thought to have migrated to Brittany at the end of his life and there are several churches there bearing his name. He is said to have died at Landerneau and been buried at Locquirec.

He is commemorated on 16 June.
