= Gwaunceste Hill =

- Bryn Gwaun-cest

Highest point
- Elevation: 542 m (1,778 ft)
- Prominence: 161 m (528 ft)
- Parent peak: Great Rhos
- Listing: Marilyn
- Coordinates: 52.1917°N 3.2329°W

Naming
- Language of name: Welsh

Geography
- Location: Powys, Wales
- OS grid: SO 158555
- Topo map: OS Landranger 148 / Explorer 200

Gwaunceste Hill (Welsh: Bryn Gwaun-cest) is a 542-metre-high hill in the county of Powys in east Wales. It falls within the communities of Gladestry and Glascwm around 4 km east of the village of Hundred House and about 2 km north of the hamlet of Glascwm. The headwaters of the River Arrow gather on the eastern slopes of the hill. Drainage of its western slopes is into the River Edw, a tributary of the River Wye. Two subsidiary tops to the southeast and southwest are both known as ‘Little Hill’.

== Geology ==
The hill is formed from mudstones, siltstones and sandstones of Silurian age. To its southeast the Church Stretton Fault Zone runs NE-SW past Gwaunceste Hill. Surrounding valleys and some of the hill’s slopes are mantled with glacial till from the last ice age whilst alluvium is found in the valley floors and peat deposits occupy hollows as at Beilibedw Mawn Pool and Llyn-y-waun to the north and west of the summit respectively.

== Access ==
The entire hill is criss-crossed by public bridleways. Much of the hill is mapped as open country under the Countryside and Rights of Way Act 2000 and thereby available to walkers.
