= Eisteddfa Gurig =

Hamlet in Ceredigion, Wales

Coordinates: 52.441°N 3.770°W

Eisteddfa Gurig is a hamlet located in Ceredigion on its border with Powys and situated along the A44. Its name comes from the Welsh word eisteddfa, meaning seat and the name of St Curig. This gives the meaning of Curig's seat. It is said that Curig rested on the hill here and looked down into the Wye Valley. He decided to build a church in the valley, which is still there today in the village of Llangurig.

The famous Elvis Rock is located here.
