= Soar y mynydd =

Capel Soar y mynydd
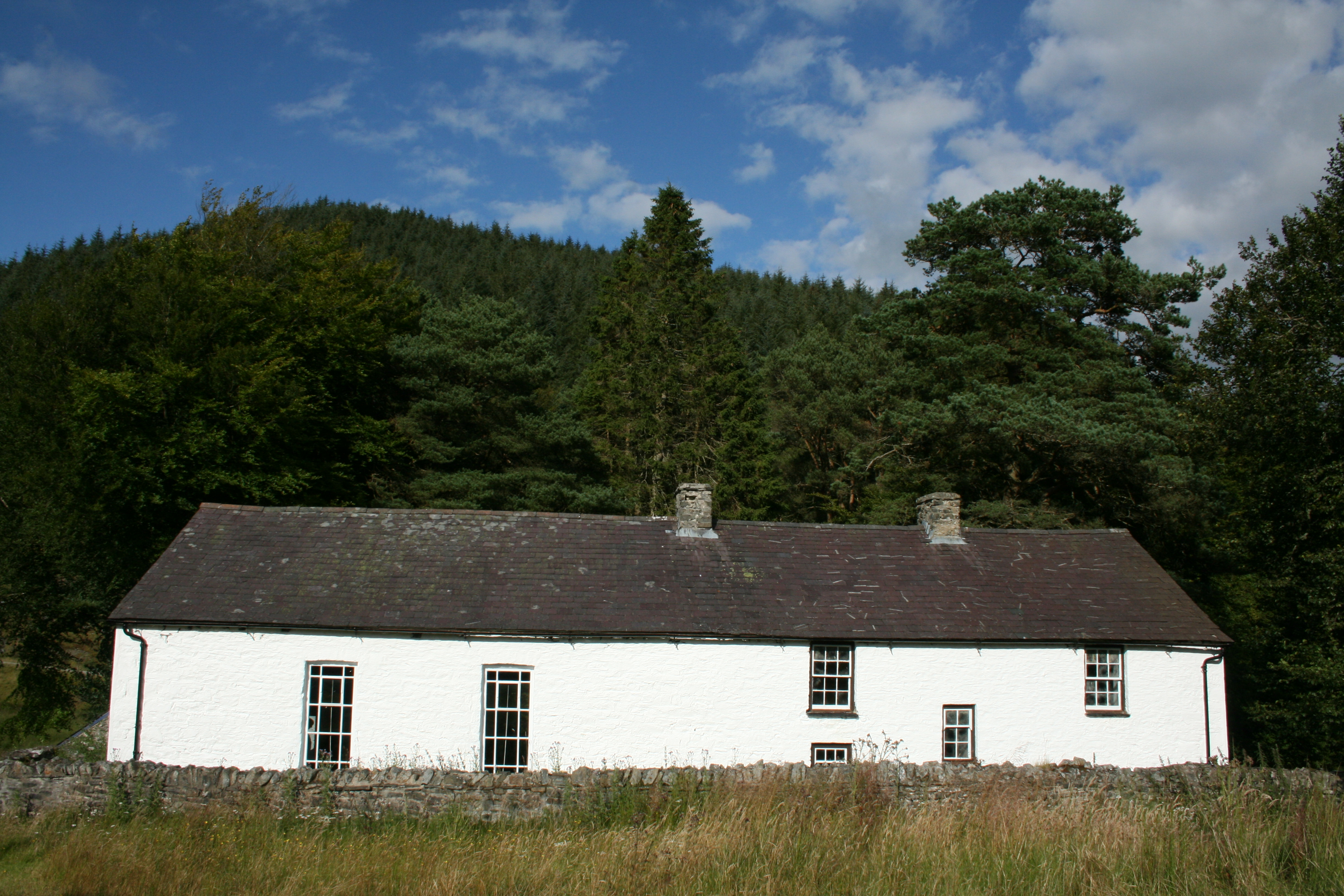

- Location within Ceredigion
- 52.1644°N 3.7782°W
- Type: Chapel
- Location: Ceredigion, Wales

History
- Built: 1803

Listed Building – Grade II*
- Official name: Capel Soar y mynydd
- Designated: 30 September 1997
- Reference no.: 18943
- Community: Llanddewi Brefi

Soar-y-mynydd or Soar y mynydd is a Calvinistic Methodist chapel near the eastern extremity of the large parish of Llanddewi Brefi in Ceredigion. It is claimed to be the remotest chapel in Wales. The name means "Zoar of the mountain", Zoar being the place where Lot found refuge during the destruction of Sodom and Gomorrah.

== Location ==
Soar-y-mynydd stands in the valley of the river Camddwr in the Cambrian Mountains, near the eastern border of Ceredigion (National Grid Reference SN 7847 5328). It is some eight miles south-east of Tregaron on the road to Llyn Brianne.

== Calvinistic Methodists ==
The Calvinistic Methodists are a Welsh Protestant revivalist movement forming the Presbyterian Church of Wales. They trace their origins to the evangelism and preaching of George Whitefield and especially Howell Harris in the late 1730s and 1740s. They formed a separate body from the Church of England and from other Methodists after 1821, when their Rules of Discipline were published, followed in 1823 by their Confession of Faith, which enshrined a moderate evangelical Calvinism. The working language of the Calvinistic Methodists has always been Welsh, and the services at Soar-y-mynydd are held in Welsh.

== History ==
The chapel was built in 1822, immediately following the independence of the Calvinistic Methodists. The prime mover was Rev. Ebenezer Richard, minister at Tregaron and father of peace campaigner Henry Richard, with his trustees, and the land was provided by John Jones, the then farmer at Nant-llwyd lower down the valley of the river Camddwr. It served the people of the sheep farms for several miles round about. The congregation had fallen to 2 in 1968 and Soar was threatened with closure, but since 1973 its status has been secured. Since its formal reopening in that year, publicity has meant that some well-attended summer services with visiting preachers are now held on the last Sunday in August. The chapel also now attracts artistic attention; it was painted for example by Ogwyn Davies in 1993, and has featured in poems for example by Harri Webb and Iwan Llwyd. The chapel closed for two years during the COVID-19 pandemic but reopened for services in May 2022.

== Architecture and environment ==
Soar-y-mynydd is a simple Cadw grade II*-listed building made of local rubble stone collected from riverbeds and ruined farmsteads in the area. It is whitewashed on the outside. It consists of a traditional rectangular side-wall façade chapel at the northern end, attached to a small two-storey house with two chimney-stacks on the ridge, under a single slate roof; the house is now derelict. The chapel is entered on the longer east side through two pairs of doors, and the pulpit is located between the two doorways. A prominent feature is the painted scroll above the pulpit with the text "Duw cariad yw", i.e. 'God is love' (First Epistle of John 4:8 and 4:16), dating from 1911. The local school met in the chapel-house until the 1940s. The chapel enclosure is walled in stone and skirted by mature trees. On the east side of the building is a graveyard, the oldest apparent stone being from 1856. The most conspicuous is the most recent (2001), that of Professor John Griffiths, a prominent London cancer surgeon.

== Sources and literature ==
Cadw (1997) Listed buildings detail report, records 18943 (building) and 18950 (outbuilding and wall).

Evans, Dyfed (1955) Soar y Mynydd. Y Cymro, 8 September 1955.

Evans, John (1904) Hanes Methodistiaeth rhan ddeheuol Sir Aberteifi, 1735–1900. Dolgellau: E. W. Evans.

Gruffydd, William John, pseud. 'Elerydd', ed. (1994) Tua Soar. Capel Soar y Mynydd. [3rd edition (or printing) 1997.]

Jones, Evan (1979) Cymdogaeth Soar-y-mynydd. Swansea/Abertawe: Christopher Davies (Cyfres cynefin).

Jones, Huw, ed. Lyn Ebenezer (2007) Bugail olaf y Cwm. Llanrwst: Gwasg Carreg Gwalch.

Perrin, Jim (2008) Country diary: Soar y Mynydd. The Guardian, 26 July 2008.

Richards, E. E. (Lynne) (2004) Soar y Mynydd. Cardiganshire Family History Society Journal 3.9 (October), 202–205.
