= Bush Bank =

Hamlet in Herefordshire, England

Coordinates: 52.159°N 2.804°W

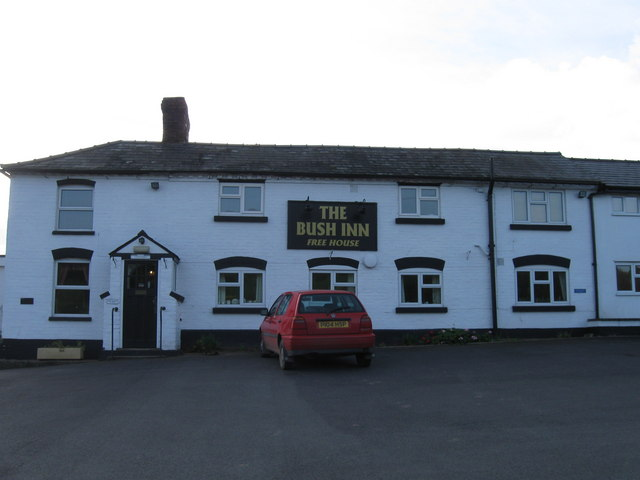
- The Bush Inn

- Location within Herefordshire
- Civil parish: King's Pyon; Birley with Upper Hill
- Unitary authority: County of Herefordshire
- Ceremonial county: Herefordshire
- Region: West Midlands
- Country: England
- Sovereign state: United Kingdom

Bush Bank is a hamlet partly in the civil parish of King's Pyon and partly in Birley with Upper Hill, in Herefordshire, England. It is on the A4110 road.
