= Camddwr, Teifi =

River near Lledrod, in Ceredigion, Wales

For the tributary of the River Towy, see Camddwr and for the tributary of the River Ithon, see Camddwr, Wye.

The Camddwr is a right-bank tributary of the River Teifi in Ceredigion, mid Wales. It rises to the west of the village of Bronnant and flows in a generally southeasterly direction to join the Teifi at Cors Caron, an extensive inland marsh protected as a national nature reserve. Its tributary streams include the right-bank ones of Afon Talfryn, Afon Hirfain, Nant yr Efail and Nant Tyn-y-swydd and Camddwr fach which enters on its left bank.
