= Llanbister =

- Location within Powys
- Population: 382 (2011)
- OS grid reference: SO111733
- Community: Llanbister
- Principal area: Powys
- Preserved county: Powys
- Country: Wales
- Sovereign state: United Kingdom
- Post town: LLANDRINDOD WELLS
- Postcode district: LD1
- Dialling code: 01597
- Police: Dyfed-Powys
- Fire: Mid and West Wales
- Ambulance: Welsh
- UK Parliament: Brecon, Radnor and Cwm Tawe
- Senedd Cymru – Welsh Parliament: Brecon and Radnorshire
- Website: Llanbister Community Council
- List of places UK Wales Powys 52.3514°N 3.3061°W Community map: Map of the community

Llanbister (Welsh pronunciation) is a small village and community with a 2011 population of 382 in Powys, mid Wales, in the historic county of Radnorshire. It is on the river Ithon, at the junction of the A483 road (which follows the river north towards Newtown and south towards Llandrindod Wells) and the B4356.

== Name ==
The first element in the place name is the usual Welsh llan meaning a church enclosure, but the second element "pister" has not been explained. It may be related to Latin "pistorius" meaning a bakery or bakehouse in British usage.

== Facilities ==
The nearest railway station is Llanbister Road railway station, which is about 5 miles east of the village. It is served by a bus service (the T4 operated by Stagecoach Wales) which connects Cardiff to Newtown via Merthyr Tydfil, Brecon, Builth Wells and Llandrindod Wells.

Llanbister is situated on the A483 main road from Newtown to Llandrindod Wells, at its junction with the B4356 road. It also lies next to the River Ithon which flows southward just west of the village.

There was previously a police station in Llanbister, on the north west outskirts of the village, but this has been sold off as private housing.

Other facilities include a primary school, Llanbister C P School, a children's play area and a 200-person capacity community hall built in 1996 which has a stage and a 6.25m × 4m dance floor. There used to be a Post Office in the centre of the village but it is no longer operating: it was proposed for closure in 2008.

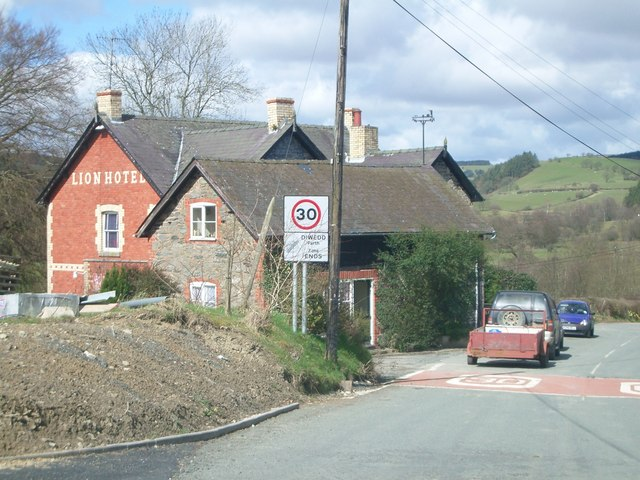
The Lion Hotel, Llanbister

There is a Victorian pub and bed and breakfast hotel (The Lion Hotel) in the village and a caravan and camping site to the north west of the village, near the former police station.

There is an area of common land to the east of the village, named Llanbister Common. In July 1991 an unlicensed free music festival was held there, which was not well received by the local population, so in summer 1992 manure was spread on the land to make a repeat less likely. There is evidence of possible medieval ridge and furrow cultivation on Llanbister Common.

In 2018 the horror film You Should Have Left was partly filmed at a property near Llanbister, the John Pawson-designed Life House (Tŷ Bywyd) just east of the village.

== Churches ==
The village has an Anglican church in the centre, St Cynllo's Parish Church (part of the Church in Wales), parts of which date from around AD 1300. It is listed with Cadw as Grade II*.

== Notable residents ==
- Eleanor Bufton (1842–1893), the actress, was born here.
