= Haven Herefords =

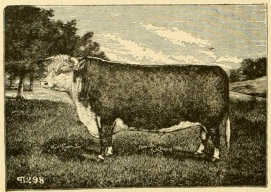
Anxiety 4th, which together with Lewis's Woodhouse Dowager 6th became a cornerstone of the Hereford breed in the USA.

Haven Herefords is the oldest family run herd of Hereford cattle in the world and is operated from the hamlet known as The Haven at Dilwyn in Herefordshire, UK. The herd is in its fifth generation and is currently being run by Edward Lewis.

== Herd history ==
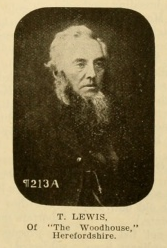
Thomas Lewis - founder of The Haven herd

=== Thomas Lewis ===
Thomas Lewis founded his Hereford herd at The Woodhouse, Shobdon, Herefordshire in 1822, 24 years before the publication of the first Hereford Cattle Herd Book. Many animals were exported from The Woodhouse Herd especially to the United States of America in the boom years of the 1880s, although Hereford cattle had first been introduced to the country in either 1816 or 1817. Among the 1880s sales was Woodhouse Dowager 6th whom Messrs. Gudgell & Simpson bought, along with Anxiety 4th, (Note: The Anxiety line of cattle were bred by T. J. Carwardine, another breeder from the area.) in 1881 and became the cornerstone of the Hereford breed's presence in the US. The policy of Gudgell and Simpson was to line breed their early imports, and their most notable achievement was the breeding of Prince Domino in 1914: he was probably the greatest bull in the early development of the North American Herefords. There were at least eight crosses of Woodhouse Dowager 6th in the pedigree of this bull.

=== James Lewis ===
James Lewis moved from The Woodhouse when he married Margaret Bray, whose grandfather was a nephew of Benjamin Tomkins, the original breeder of the Hereford. The couple set up home at The Haven in 1888 and continued to breed Herefords. One of the cows that they brought from The Woodhouse was Teresa 2nd, who founded the Tiny and Thrush families that are still prominent in the herd today. Among his most successful bulls during this period was Leyburn, a notable breeder of the day who produced a son, Haven Turgot, who was Champion at Hereford Show and Sale in 1917. Turgot was the first bull to be brought out by a lady in Hereford Market, this being James Lewis' daughter as his son Edward was away at World War I.

=== Edward Lewis ===
Edward Lewis took over The Haven from his father, James, when he married Beatrice Francis in 1928. This being the period of the Great Depression, the first ten years of his breeding was concentrated on survival and maintenance of the best attributes of the Hereford strain. He managed this by acquiring Free Town Bodyguard in 1946, a son of Bodyguard. Haven Victory was sold to Senor Duggan from Argentina in the February Show and Sale and Haven Broadside, another son of Bodyguard, was the first bull to make 1000 guineas at the Hereford April Sale when sold to the Duke of Newcastle. In 1948, Haven Idol, son of Tarington Magnate, was purchased by The Woodlands stud in Australia, where he proved to be an outstanding sire. The Queen viewed the cattle at Hereford Market in this year.

=== E. L. Lewis & Son ===
E. L. Lewis & Son was formed in 1949 when Edward's son, Leslie, and daughter, Sybil, joined their father. Their first purchase was Shucknall Favourite, who proved to be one of the top breed sires for over a decade. Many of his progeny were exported throughout the world and were almost unbeatable in the show ring. The Haven acquired the female lines namely the Pinky, Prunella and Julia families formerly of the Vern herd and the Lady Lynda's of the Tarrington herd. Still in the herd today.

The Glasgow Herald reported that representative animals from the herd "swept the boards" at the Royal Highland Show of 1964 and "stole the show" at the 1965 event. In 1976 the same newspaper noted that the herd was "internationally famous", with sales having been made to Canada, China, Egypt, Israel, Russia, South Africa and South America. It was also noted that Edward and Leslie Lewis had produced "many champion Herefords". At that time it was stated that on-the-farm auctions were planned to be an annual event.
