= Bredenbury =

Village in Herefordshire, England

Coordinates: 52.204°N 2.572°W

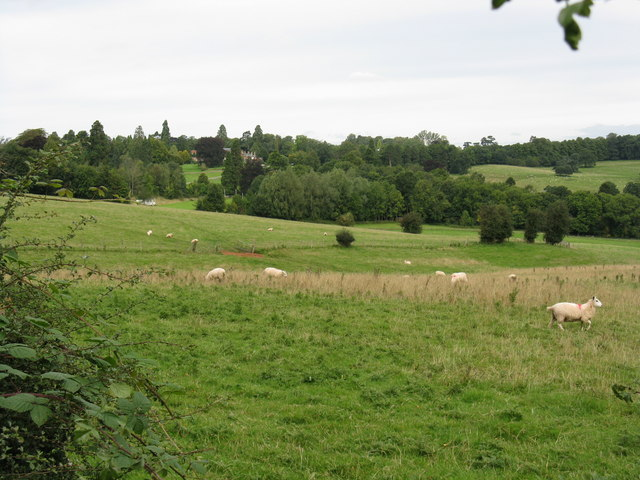
- Pasture near Bredenbury

- Location within Herefordshire
- Population: 169
- OS grid reference: SO 609563
- Unitary authority: Herefordshire
- Ceremonial county: Herefordshire
- Region: West Midlands
- Country: England
- Sovereign state: United Kingdom
- Post town: BROMYARD
- Postcode district: HR7
- Dialling code: 01885
- Police: West Mercia
- Fire: Hereford and Worcester
- Ambulance: West Midlands
- UK Parliament: North Herefordshire

Bredenbury is a village and civil parish in Herefordshire, England. It is located 12.5 miles (20.1 km) northeast of Hereford. The village lies on the A44 road, 3 miles (4.8 km) from Bromyard and 8 miles (13 km) from Leominster.

The parish had a population of 185 in the 2001 UK census, reducing to 169 at the 2011 census, and is grouped with Grendon Bishop and Wacton to form Bredenbury & District Group Parish Council for administrative purposes.

The parish church, dedicated to St Andrew, is in the syle of 1300 but was built in the 1870s from a design by T H Wyatt. Land for the church was donated by William Barneby, of nearby Bredenbury Court. The Barneby family commissioned many of the interior furnishings for the new church. Wyatt also designed the first phase of Bredenbury Court in the Italianate style. An extension in 1902 was designed by Sir Guy Dawber.

Bredenbury Primary School is much smaller than average, but was rated as outstanding by Ofsted in 2008.

Bredenbury Court Barns is one of the more historic and iconic venues situated within Bredenbury, with the barns now being used for weddings.
