= Pen-y-Bont railway station =

Railway station in Powys, Wales

Pen-y-Bont
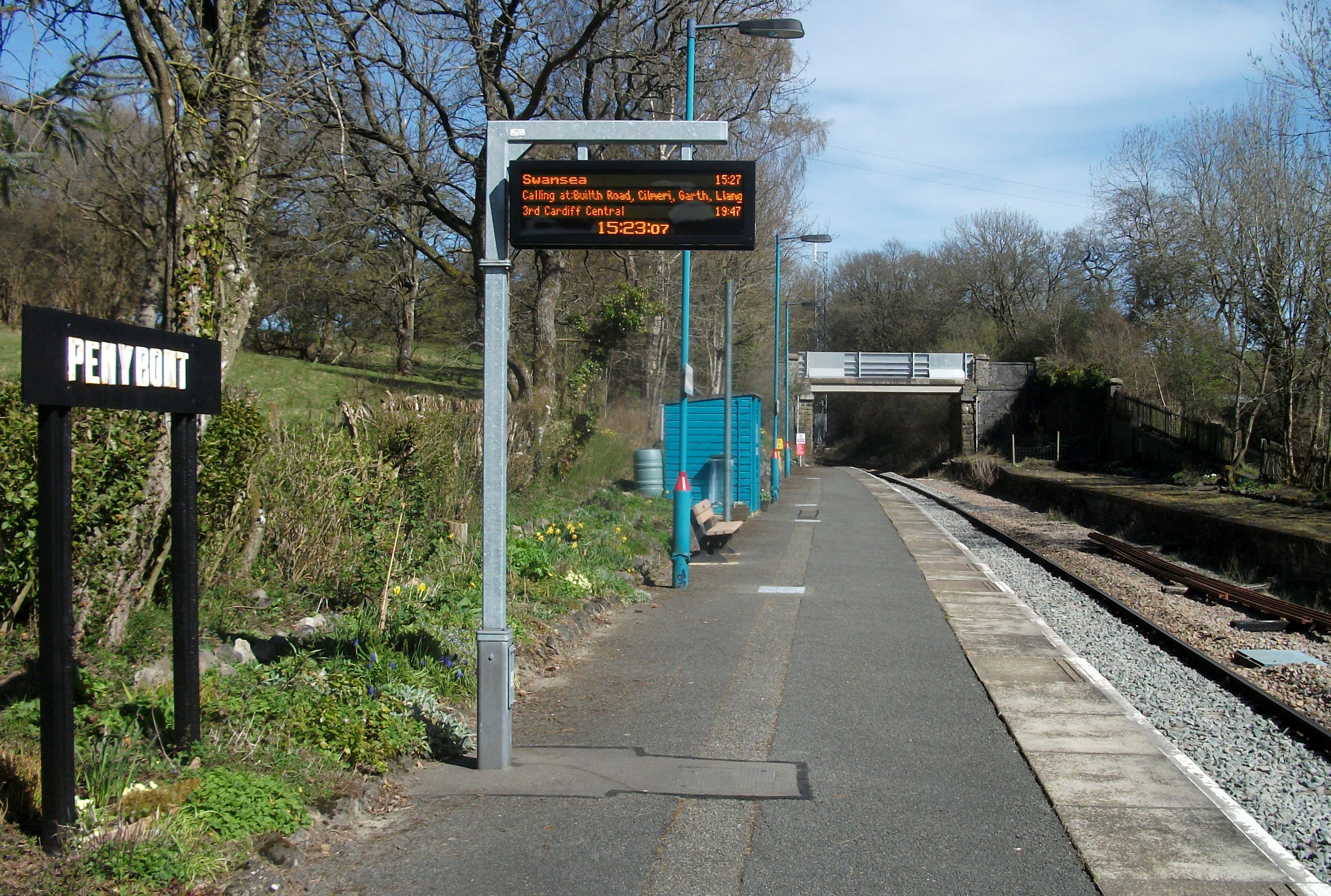

General information
- Location: Penybont, Powys; Wales
- Coordinates: 52.274°N 3.322°W
- Grid reference: SO097648
- Manager: Transport for Wales
- Platforms: 1

Other information
- Station code: PNY
- Classification: DfT category F1

History
- Opened: 1865

Passengers
- 2021/22: ▲524
- 2022/23: ▲1,004
- 2023/24: ▲1,110
- 2024/25: ▲1,264
- 2025/26: ▲1,608
Location
Notes
- Passenger statistics from the Office of Rail and Road

Pen-y-Bont railway station serves the village of Penybont, in mid Wales. It is situated on the Heart of Wales Line, 48 1/2 miles (78.1 km) south west of Shrewsbury. The station is located closer to the villages of Crossgates and Fron than it is to Penybont itself. It is now the closest station to the town of Rhayader, about 9 miles (14 km) to the west.

== Facilities ==
The station is an unstaffed request stop with one active platform; the other is still visible. It has the same amenities as other Heart of Wales line stations, including CIS display, customer help point, timetable poster board and payphone. A small wooden waiting shelter is located near the information screen, with a barrow crossing linking the platform to the car park and main entrance from the A44.

== Services ==
All trains serving the station are operated by Transport for Wales. There are five trains a day in each direction from Monday to Saturday, with a sixth northbound train on weekdays only; there are two services on Sundays.

Preceding station	National Rail	Following station
Llandrindod	Transport for Wales; Heart of Wales Line	Dolau
