= Llyn Brianne =

Reservoir in Powys, Wales

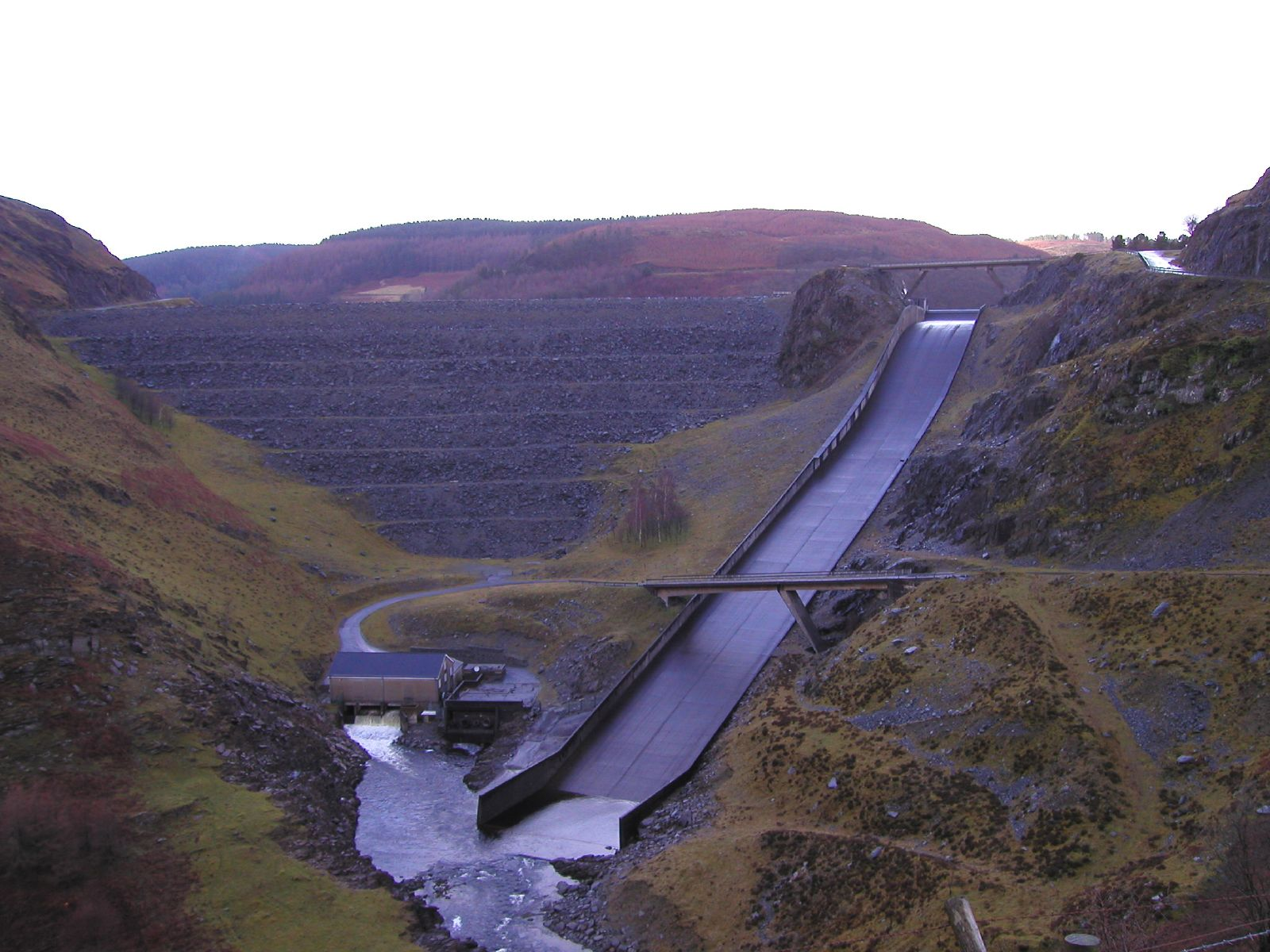
- The Llyn Brianne rock-fill dam

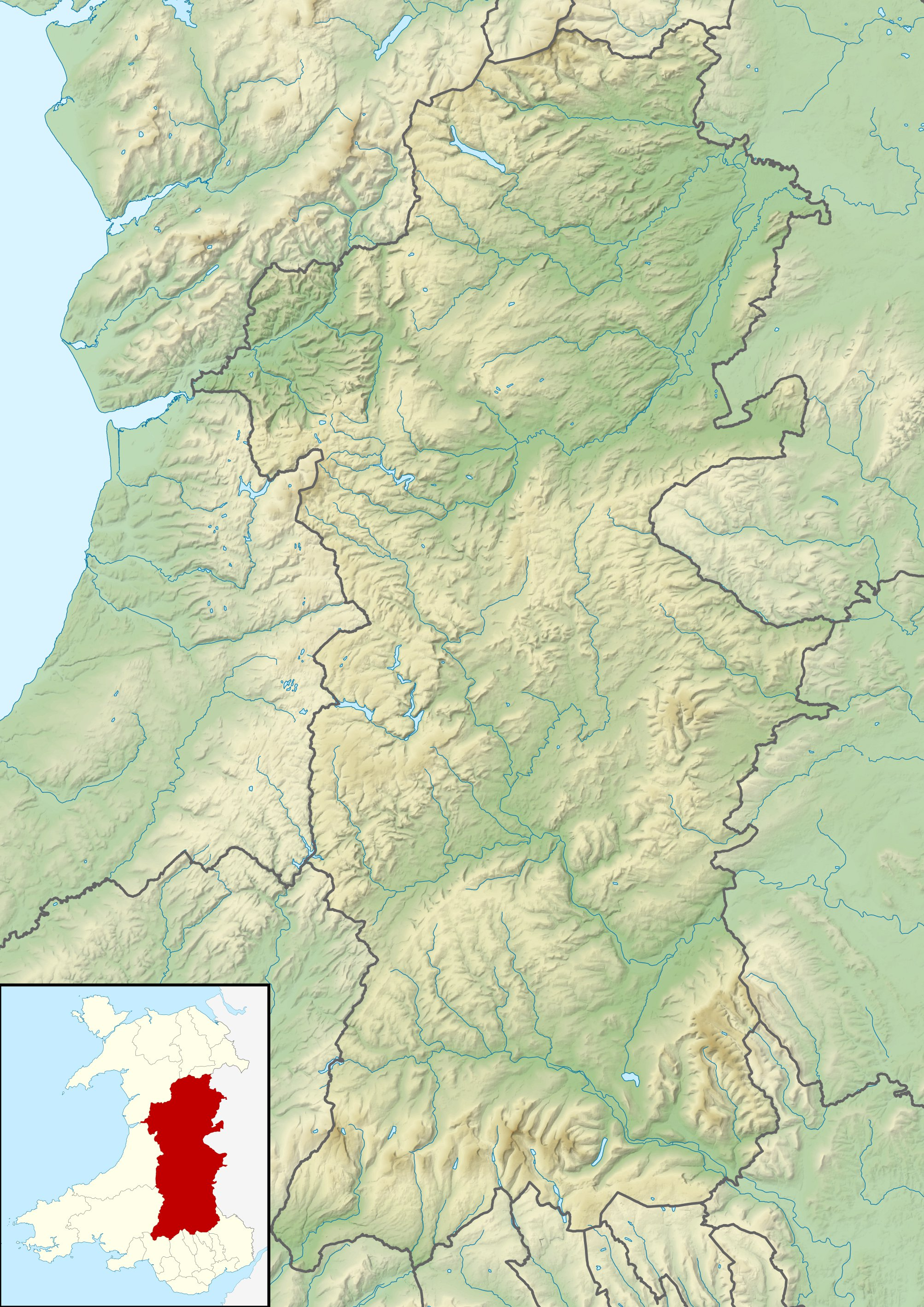
- Location within Powys
- Location: Wales
- Coordinates: 52°8′N 3°45′W
- Type: reservoir
- Basin countries: United Kingdom

Llyn Brianne is a man-made reservoir in the headwaters of the River Towy in Wales.

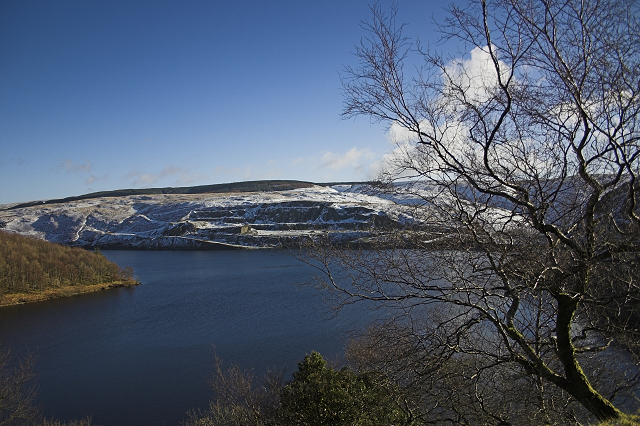
Looking east over the reservoir

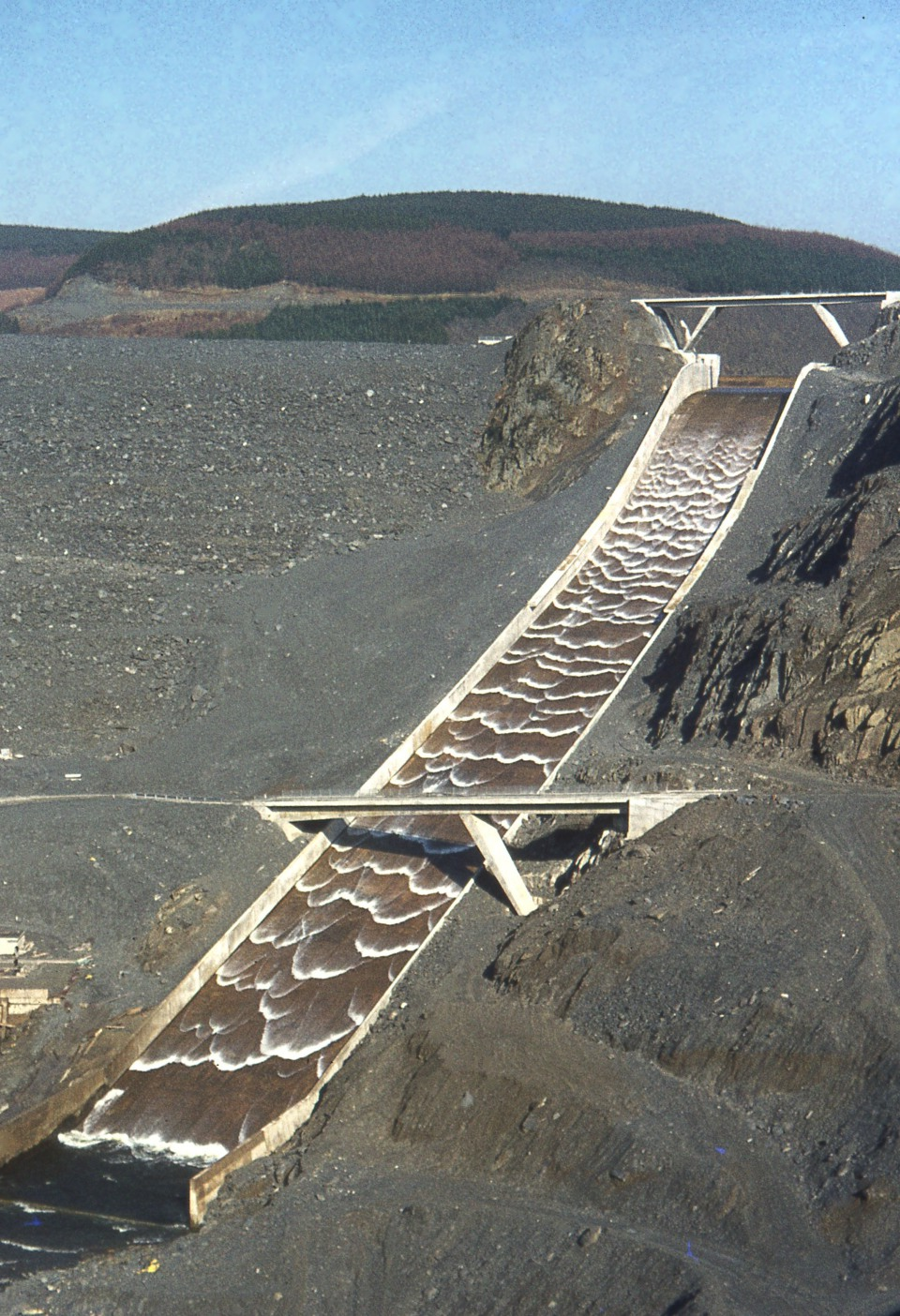
The Llyn Brianne spillway after its first fill at commissioning

== Construction ==
The reservoir was constructed by Wimpey Construction in the late 1960s and early 1970s in order to regulate the flow in the Towy to support large potable water abstraction at Nantgaredig in the lower reaches of the river near Carmarthen; providing water to the Felindre water treatment works. The treated water is piped to a large area of South Wales which includes Swansea and Neath and the western periphery of Cardiff.

== Structure ==
The dam is of crushed rock, larger rock and clay; all materials having been obtained in the area. In essence, it is a constructed mountain blocking the valley. The clay was harvested higher up the valley near Soar y mynydd chapel closer to Tregaron. Much of the rock was harvested at the site. An on-site stone-crusher was used to reduce larger rocks to the various sizes required. A round-the-clock labouring system enabled its completion almost two years ahead of schedule.

=== Fish conservation ===
Because of the importance of the River Towy salmon and trout fisheries, special protective measures were incorporated into the construction of the reservoir including a smolt trap and a restocking programme using artificially raised parr. Releases of water from the dam tend to be very cold and are also blamed by anglers for a reduction in the quality of the fishery.

== Hydroelectric scheme ==
The spillway of the dam is a notable tourist attraction when the reservoir is spilling. The dam is the UK's tallest, standing at a height of 300 ft (91 m). In 1996 the reservoir spillway was increased by one metre in height and a hydroelectric generating station was added at the base of the dam. When all three turbines are working, it generates 4.60 megawatts of electricity.

Several flooded houses are submerged beneath the reservoir. Before the water level was raised, it was possible to walk to Fannog farmhouse; a "For Sale" sign was once erected on it. It is still possible to see the roof when the water level is low.

== Activities permitted on the reservoir ==
Since 19 April 2011 the reservoir has been governed by a set of bylaws known as the 'Dwr Cymru Cyf, Llyn Brianne Bylaws 2010' which are enforceable under The Water Industry Acts 1991–2003. These bylaws (among other things) specifically forbid "bathing, diving, and swimming in the reservoir, as well as using any boat (kayak, canoe or any other vessel including a ski-jet) in on or over any part of the waterway". The bylaws also forbid angling without a permit issued by Welsh Water.

The spillway has previously been used by kayakers to slide down while the water was in flood, and following a peak of media interest in this activity around 2008, Welsh Water issued a statement, calling the practice "dangerous" and stating that such activities were banned at the reservoir. According to a BBC report also from 2008, Richard Harvey from the Welsh Canoeing Association said he could not comment on the group involved, the locality or the legality of their activity but he did say he was aware the slipway had been used by kayakers for about 20 years.
