= St Cosmas and St Damian's Church, Stretford =

Coordinates: 52.1971°N 2.8156°W

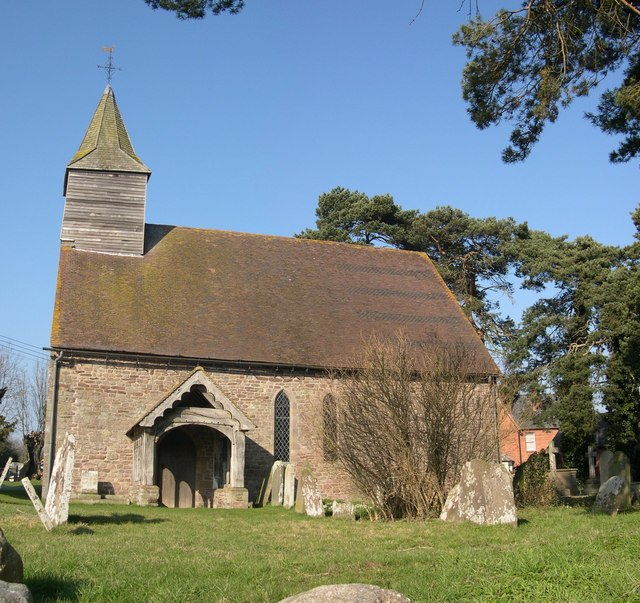
- St Cosmas and St Damian's Church, Stretford, from the south

- Location in Herefordshire
- OS grid reference: SO 443 557
- Location: Stretford, Herefordshire
- Country: England
- Denomination: Anglican
- Website: Churches Conservation Trust

Architecture
- Functional status: Redundant
- Heritage designation: Grade I
- Designated: 2 September 1966
- Architectural type: Church
- Groundbreaking: 12th century
- Completed: 14th century

Specifications
- Materials: Stone, tile roof

St Cosmas and St Damian's Church is a redundant Anglican church standing in a farmyard in Stretford, Herefordshire, England. It is recorded in the National Heritage List for England as a designated Grade I listed building, and is under the care of the Churches Conservation Trust. The church is dedicated to Saints Cosmas and Damian, patron saints of physicians and surgeons.

== History ==
The church originates from the 12th century, it was extended in the 13th century, and partly rebuilt during the following century. The roof was constructed in about 1540. The church underwent a Victorian restoration in 1875 and further restoration in 1922. The church was declared redundant on 1 December 1972, and was vested in the Churches Conservation Trust on 25 January 1974.

== Architecture ==
=== Exterior ===
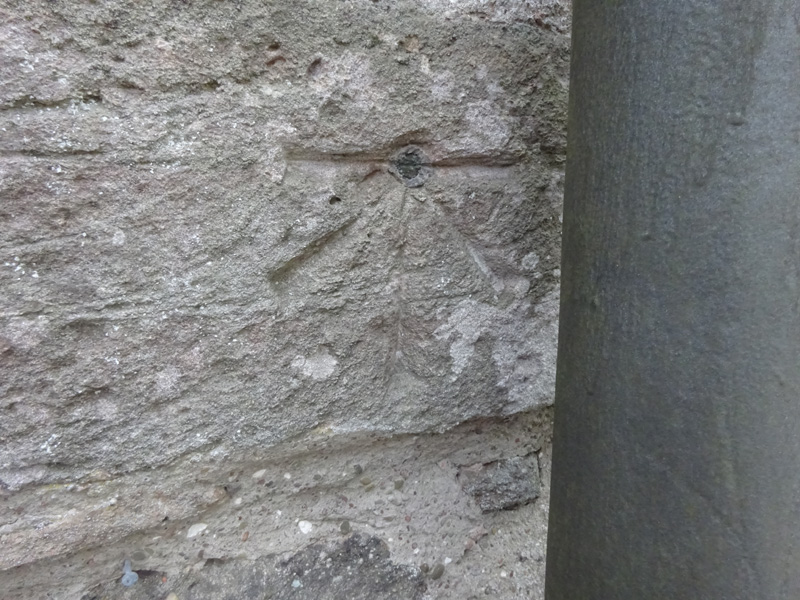
Benchmark East corner (87.9 m ASL)

The church is almost as wide as it is long. It is constructed in coursed rubble stone with ashlar dressings, and it has a machine-tile roof. Its plan consists of two naves and two chancels in parallel under a single roof, and a south porch. At the west end is a shingled bellcote with a small broach spire. In the north wall are a large lancet window, a small window with a semicircular head, and a blocked door with a semicircular head. The west window of the north nave has a two-light window with another circular window above it. The east window also has two lights. On the south side of the church are two lancet windows and a timber porch. At the entrance to the porch is an arch-braced tie-beam. The west window has two lights and the east window has three lights.

=== Interior ===
Dividing the naves and chancels is a central arcade in three bays. In the north wall are two tomb recesses, each containing two effigies dating probably from the 14th century. These are thought to represent members of the Delabere family who lived locally. The naves are divided from the chancels by two large 16th-century wooden screens. In the middle of the screens is a Jacobean pulpit. Each screen is in two bays, with a central door.

== See also ==
- List of churches preserved by the Churches Conservation Trust in the English Midlands
