= Monkland and Stretford =

Civil parish in Herefordshire, England

Coordinates: 52.208918°N 2.805581°W

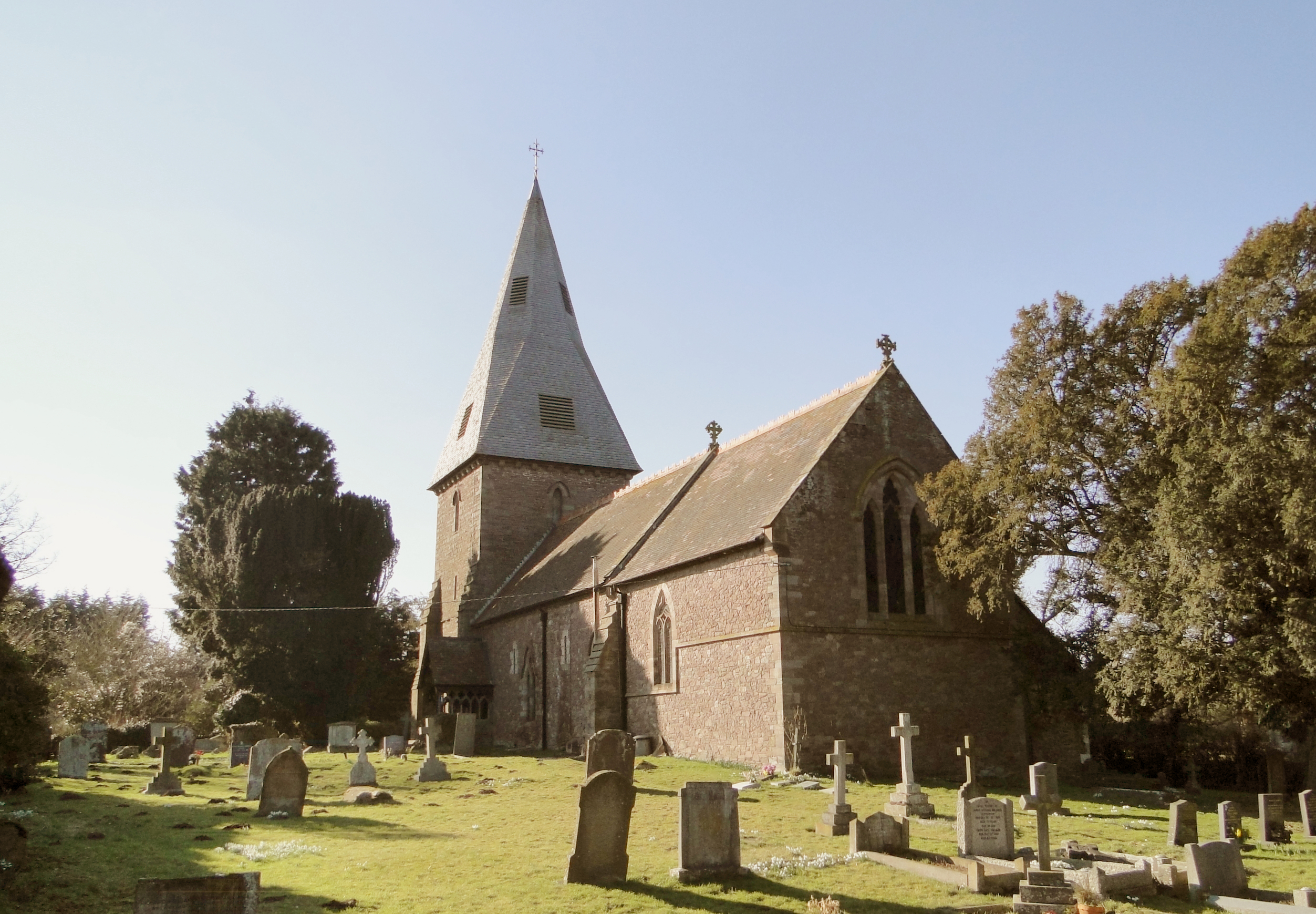
- Monkland church

- Location within Herefordshire
- Population: 178 (2011 census)
- Civil parish: Monkland and Stretford
- Unitary authority: County of Herefordshire
- Ceremonial county: Herefordshire
- Region: West Midlands
- Country: England
- Sovereign state: United Kingdom

Monkland and Stretford is a civil parish in the English county and unitary authority of Herefordshire. The population of the civil parish at the 2011 census was 178.

The main settlement of the parish is Monkland.

The parish was formed on 1 April 1987 from "Monkland" and "Stretford".
