= River Ithon =

River in Powys, Wales

Coordinates: 52°13′N 3°27′W

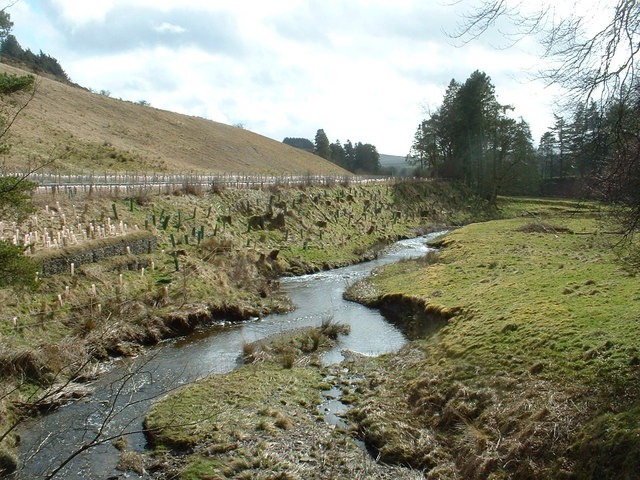
Upper reaches of the River Ithon

The River Ithon (Welsh: Afon Ieithon) is a major left-bank tributary of the River Wye in Powys, mid Wales. It rises in the broad saddle between the western end of Kerry Hill and the hill of Glog to its west and flows initially southwards to Llanbadarn Fynydd. It then takes a twisting route south via the villages of Llanbister, Llanddewi Ystradenny and Penybont before turning southwest, then doubling back northwards towards Crossgates. From here it resumes a southwesterly course, flowing past Llandrindod Wells and the site of Cefnllys Castle to a confluence with the Wye, 1 mile to the south of Newbridge-on-Wye.

== Camddwr ==
For the tributary of the River Towy, see Camddwr and for the tributary of the River Teifi, see Camddwr, Teifi.

The Camddwr is a left-bank tributary of the Ithon. It rises in undulating countryside to the east of Llanbister and flows in a generally southwesterly direction to join the Ithon at Abercamddwr.
