= Stretford, Herefordshire =

Village in Herefordshire, England

Coordinates: 52.1970°N 2.8156°W

Stretford
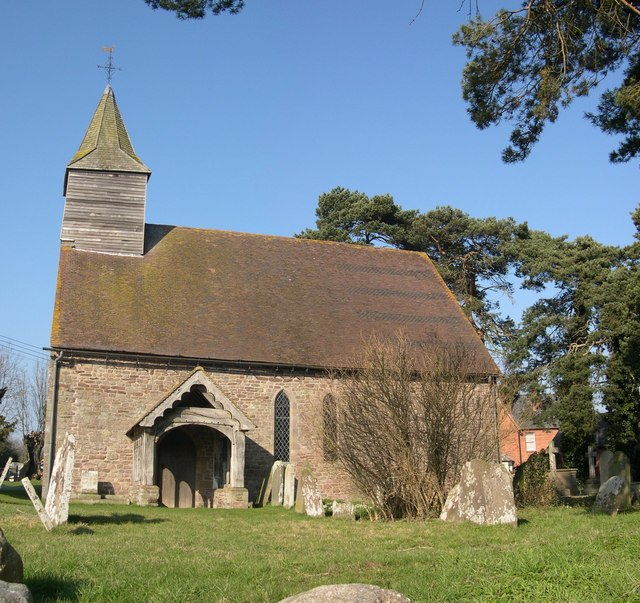
- St Cosmas and St Damian's Church, Stretford

- Location within Herefordshire
- Civil parish: Monkland and Stretford
- Unitary authority: Herefordshire
- Shire county: Herefordshire
- Region: West Midlands
- Country: England
- Sovereign state: United Kingdom
- Post town: Leominster
- Postcode district: HR6
- Police: West Mercia
- Fire: Hereford and Worcester
- Ambulance: West Midlands
- UK Parliament: North Herefordshire

Stretford is a small village and former civil parish, now in the parish of Monkland and Stretford, in Herefordshire, England, about three miles (5 km) west of Leominster. In 1961 the parish had a population of 22. On 1 April 1987 the parish was abolished and merged with Monkland to form "Monkland & Stretford".

The most notable building in the village is the Grade I listed St Cosmas and St Damian's Church.
