= Dilwyn =

Village in Herefordshire, England

Coordinates: 52.186°N 2.856°W

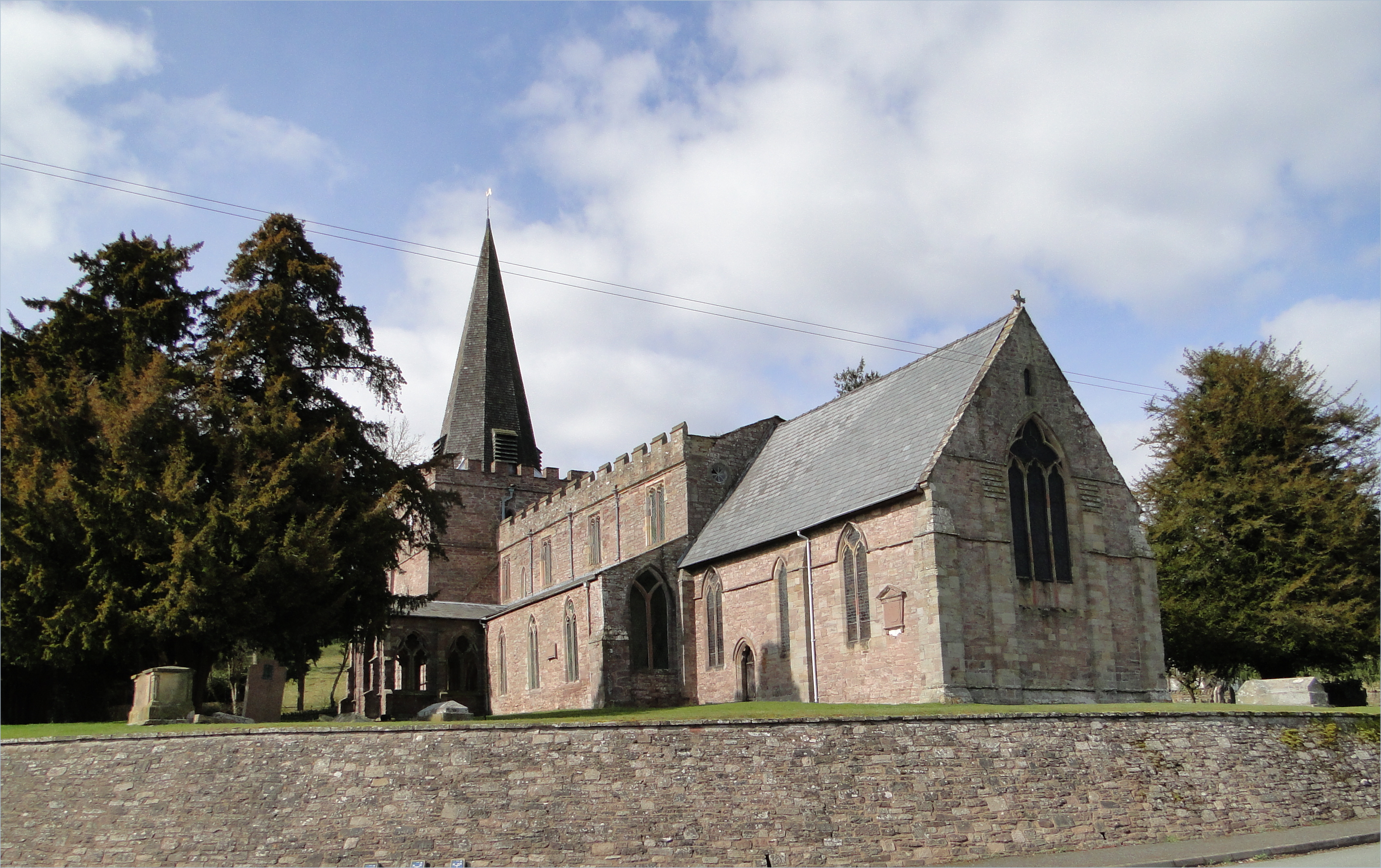
- St Mary's church

- Location within Herefordshire
- Population: 711 (2011)
- Unitary authority: Herefordshire
- Ceremonial county: Herefordshire
- Region: West Midlands
- Country: England
- Sovereign state: United Kingdom
- Post town: HEREFORD
- Postcode district: HR4
- Dialling code: 01544
- Police: West Mercia
- Fire: Hereford and Worcester
- Ambulance: West Midlands
- UK Parliament: North Herefordshire

Dilwyn is a village in Herefordshire, England located about 18 km (11 mi) from the city of Hereford and 9 km (6 mi) from its nearest town, Leominster. It is situated on the northern edge of a broad valley that stretches from the River Wye through to Leominster. Running through the valley, south of the village, is the Stretford Brook whilst to the north are the rivers Arrow and Lugg.

Dilwyn civil parish includes the hamlets of Sollers Dilwyn, Little Dilwyn, The Haven, Hill Top, The Hurst, Headland, Bearton, Bidney, Henwood, Stockmoor and Stockingfield amongst others. There are over 200 dwellings spread throughout the 6,400 acres (26 km^{2}) of the parish. The population in 2001 was 758.

The 12th-century village church of St Mary is a grade I listed building. It was realigned from the original Norman setting, the south arcade surviving with buttresses in the southern part of the old nave. The chancel contains unique example of ballflowers decoration in the chancel, and with the north transept dates from 1310 to 1330. The rood and parclose screens are also medieval. The foliated crosses on coffin lids in the south aisle are medieval with 14th century tiles. The south porch in 16th century. The only surviving effigy is one of a knight from circa 1320. There is a damaged cement or composition of a kneeling couple from the late 15th century under canopies; the damage is modern. The churchyard contains Commonwealth war graves of a Royal Navy seaman and a Royal Garrison Artillery soldier of World War I.

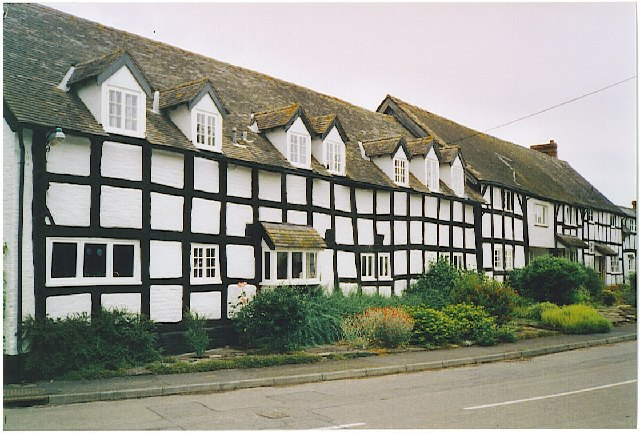

Dilwyn is in the popular tourist area of north-west Herefordshire and is on the black and white village trail. The village, the surrounding area and the market towns of Leominster and Kington are well known for their black and white timber-framed buildings. Dilwyn itself has many black and white half-timbered houses, both within the central village and scattered throughout the many hamlets within the extensive 6,400 acres (26 km^{2}) of this rural parish.

== See also ==
- Haven Herefords
