= Black and white village =

Village in United Kingdom

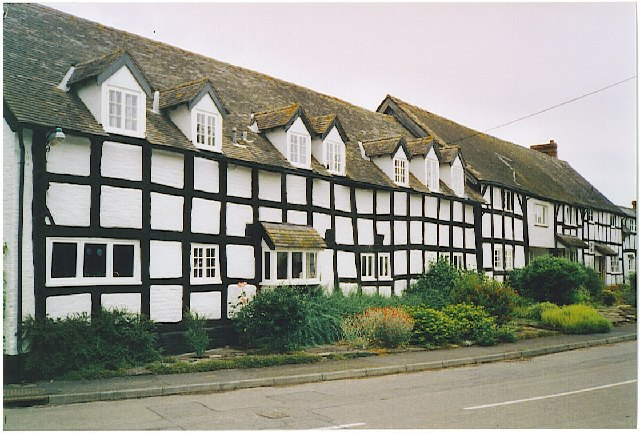
Black and white cottages in Dilwyn.

The term black and white village refers to several old English villages, typically in the county of Herefordshire, West Midlands of England.

The term "black and white" derives from presence of many timbered and half-timbered houses in the area, some dating from medieval times. The buildings' black oak beams are exposed on the outside, with white painted walls between. The numbers of houses surviving in this style in the villages creates a very distinctive impression and differs from building styles outside this area.

A 40-mile (64 km) circular tourist trail known as the "Black and White Village Trail" was developed in 1987 as a means of encouraging tourists to take a closer look at the Herefordshire villages, heritage and countryside. A free leaflet is available from local Tourist Information Centres, including in Leominster. The trail was developed mainly for travel by car, but it is also possible to make the journey by bicycle. Many coach tours now take in the trail also.

== Locations on the trail ==
- Dilwyn
- Eardisley
- Kingsland
- Weobley
- Wigmore
- Yarpole
- Lyonshall
- Pembridge
- Eardisland
