= Canon Pyon =

Village in Herefordshire, England

Coordinates: 52.1356°N 2.7867°W

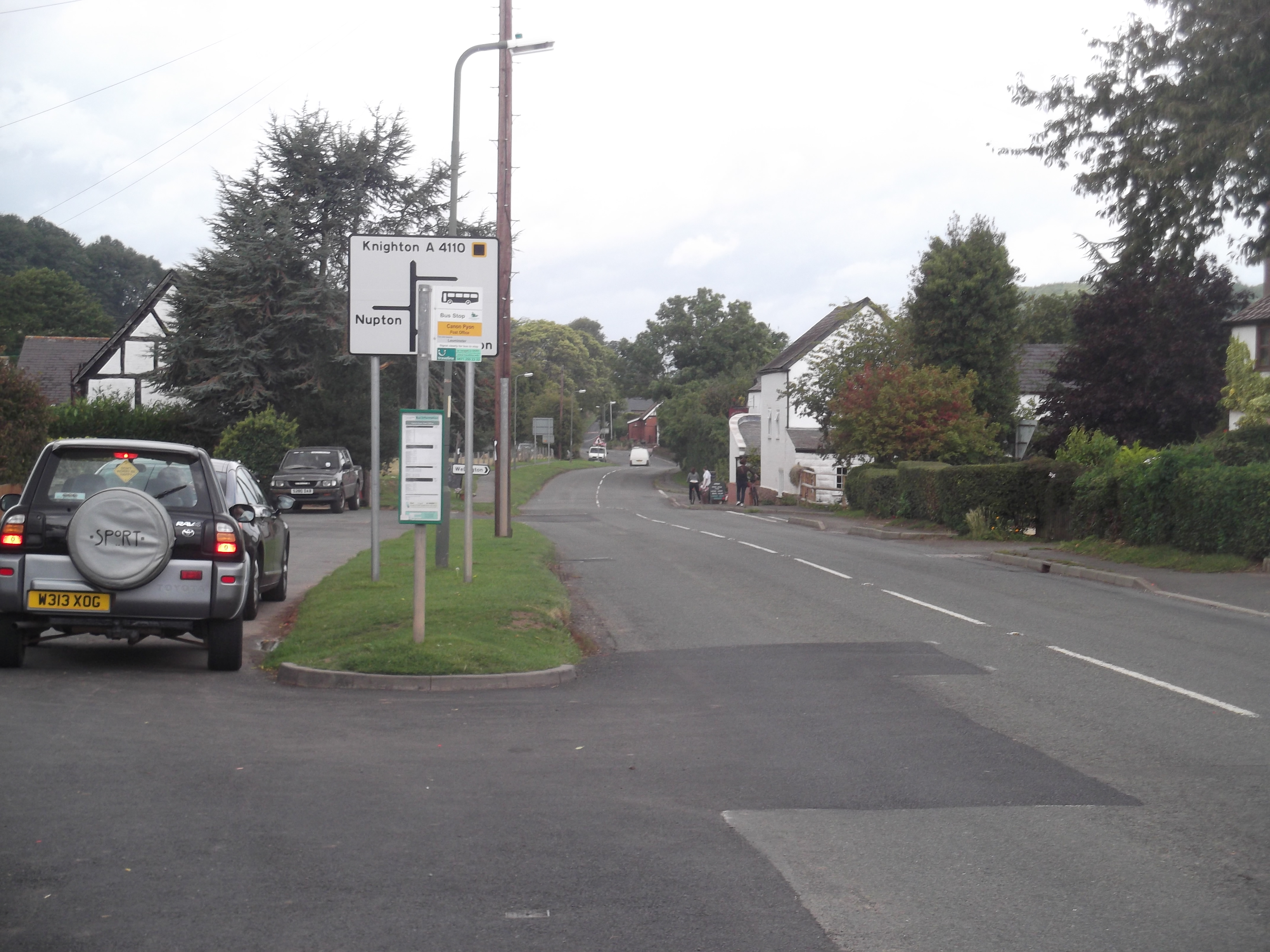
Village centre

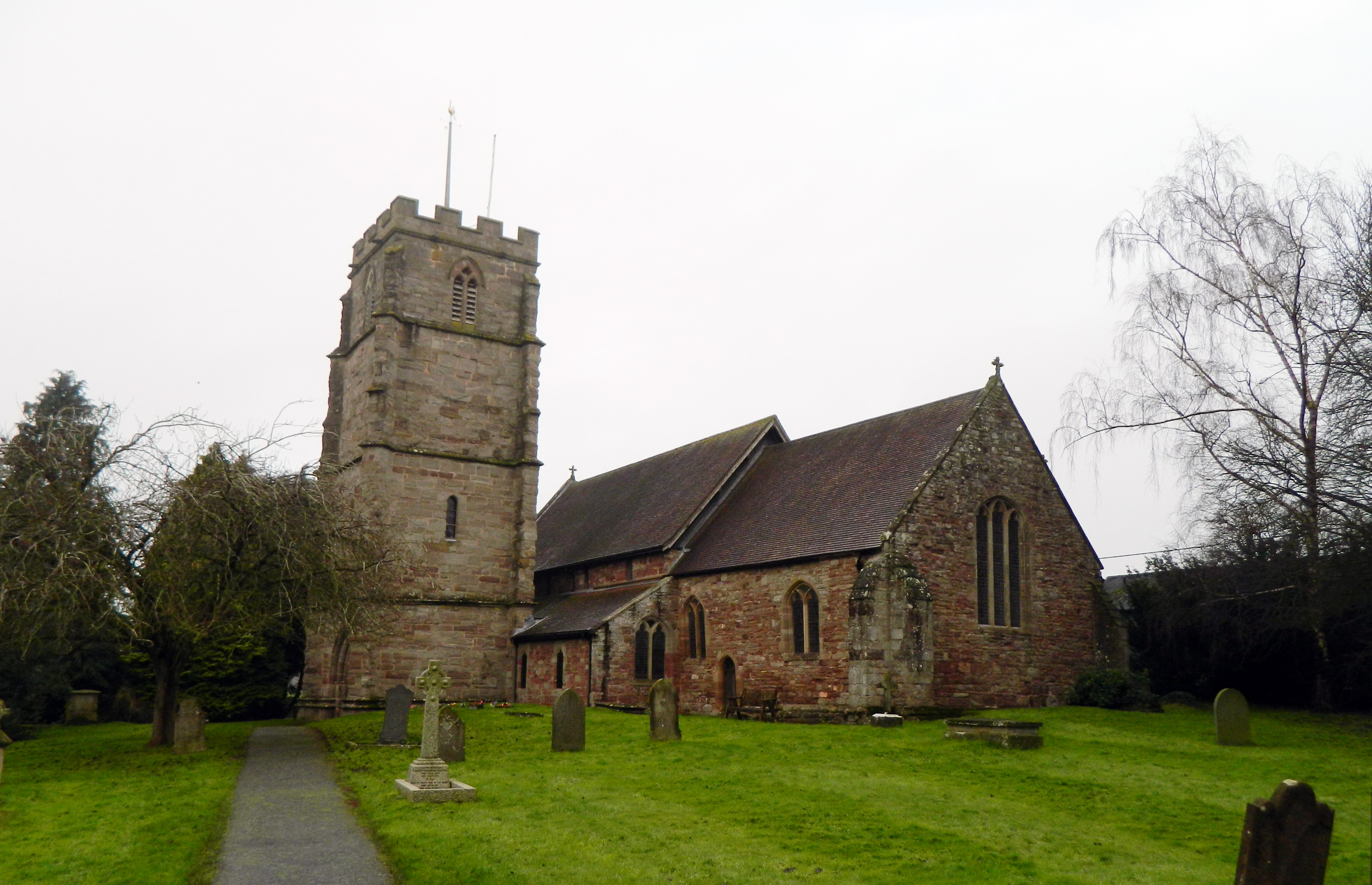
Church of St Lawrence, Canon Pyon, a Grade I listed building in the village.

Canon Pyon is a village and civil parish on the A4110 road in Herefordshire, England. The population of the parish at the 2011 Census was 542. The civil parish includes the settlement of Westhope with its tin tabernacle dedicated to St. Francis.

The name derives from the nearby Pyon Hill. 'Pyon', is unusual and not used anywhere else in Britain with the exception of the nearby village of King's Pyon.

Amenities include a village shop, The Nag's Head public house, a village hall, Canon Pyon Academy (a primary school) and the 13th-century church of St Lawrence, a Grade I listed building. Canon Pyon, with King's Pyon, has a magazine: The Pyonear.

The Hermitage is a country house near the village, built c1840-1850 and used as the summer retreat of the Bishop of Hereford.
