= River Arrow, Wales =

River in Wales and Herefordshire, United Kingdom

River Arrow
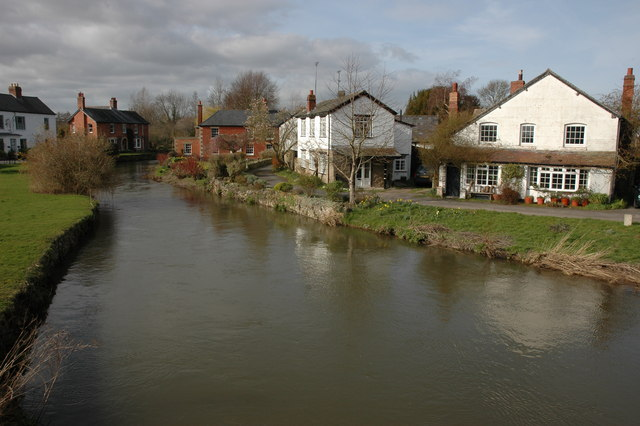
- The River Arrow in Eardisland
- Native name: Afon Arwy (Welsh)

Physical characteristics
- Source: near Gwaunceste Hill
  - location: Powys, Wales
- Mouth: River Lugg
  - location: Stoke Prior, Herefordshire, England
  - coordinates: 52.2063°N 2.7155°W

The River Arrow (Welsh: Afon Arwy) is a river in the Welsh Marches, rising in Powys in Wales, then flowing into the English county of Herefordshire.

It rises near Gwaunceste Hill, then flows south-east through Newchurch and Michaelchurch-on-Arrow. It forms a short section of the England/Wales boundary, before flowing into Herefordshire, and through the town of Kington. It proceeds east through Herefordshire, passing Lyonshall, Staunton-on-Arrow, Pembridge, Eardisland, Arrow Green, Monkland, Ivington, Broadward, and has its confluence with the River Lugg south of Leominster, at Stoke Prior.

Its tributaries include the Gilwern Brook. Others are the Honey Lake Brook, which passes through Ivington Green and Back Brook which joins the Arrow at The Meetings in Kington.

The 56 km (35 mi) Arrow Valley Trail is a long-distance footpath following the river from its source to Leominster.

== See also ==
- Rivers of the United Kingdom
