= Penybont =

Village in Powys, Wales

- Village and community
- Location within Powys
- Principal area: Powys
- Country: Wales
- Sovereign state: United Kingdom
- Police: Dyfed-Powys
- Fire: Mid and West Wales
- Ambulance: Welsh
- List of places UK Wales Powys 52°16′N 3°18′W Community map: Map of the community

Penybont (also sometimes spelled Pen-y-Bont) is a small village and community in Radnorshire, Powys, Wales. The population of the community at the 2011 census was 428. The community includes the settlement of Llandegley.

== Amenities ==
The village is served by Pen-y-Bont railway station on the Heart of Wales line.

It has an eighteenth-century coaching inn called the Severn Arms. The village also has a restored shop/museum/gallery called Thomas's Shop where there is a wool and weaving exhibition and workshop. The village hall hosts many activities and Penybont United Football Club plays its matches on the Racecourse Ground. Horse harness racing takes place here each August. Penybont market was formerly a major centre for sheep and cattle sales.
