= Newbridge on Wye railway station =

Former railway station in Powys, Wales

Newbridge on Wye

General information
- Location: Newbridge on Wye, Powys; Wales
- Coordinates: 52.2148°N 3.4431°W
- Grid reference: SO014584

Other information
- Status: Disused

History
- Original company: Mid Wales
- Pre-grouping: Cambrian Railways
- Post-grouping: Great Western Railway

Key dates
- 21 September 1864: Opened.
- 31 December 1962: Closed.
Location

Newbridge on Wye railway station stood on the single-tracked Mid Wales Railway between Builth Wells and Rhayader. It was closed on 31 December 1962 and the trackbed removed. The site has been cleared and now contains senior citizens' housing. An overbridge which formed the entry point to the station from the south is still in place.

== History ==
Newbridge on Wye railway station was opened by the Mid Wales Railway on 21 September 1864. The Mid Wales Railway got into financial difficulties and a working arrangement was made with the Cambrian Railways on 2 April 1888; who took over the line on 24 June 1904. The line later became part of the Great Western Railway.

The single-tracked Mid Wales Railway line was linked to the London and North Western Railway (LNWR)'s Central Wales line, in the direction of Cilmeri, north of Builth Road Low Level Station, by means of a junction owned by the LNWR.

The station along with the rest of the former Mid Wales Railway line was closed by the British Transport Commission on 31 December 1962.

Preceding station	Disused railways	Following station
Doldowlod; Line and station closed	Cambrian Railways; Mid Wales Railway	Builth Road; Low Level Station; Line and station closed
Doldowlod; Line and station closed	London and North Western Railway; Central Wales Extension Railway	Cilmeri railway station Line closed, station open
