= Marteg Halt railway station =

Former railway station in England

Marteg Halt

General information
- Location: Northwest of Rhayader, Powys; Wales
- Coordinates: 52.3293°N 3.5450°W
- Grid reference: SN947713
- Platforms: 1

Other information
- Status: Disused

History
- Opened: 18 May 1931; 94 years ago
- Closed: 31 December 1962; 63 years ago
- Original company: Great Western Railway
- Post-grouping: Great Western Railway
Location

Marteg Halt railway station was a station to the northwest of Rhayader, Powys, Wales. The station closed in 1962. The station was demolished after closure and nothing now remains.

Preceding station	Disused railways	Following station
St Harmons; Line and station closed	Great Western Railway; Mid-Wales Railway	Rhayader; Line and station closed
