= Boughrood =

Village in the county of Powys, Wales

Coordinates: 52.045°N 3.2714°W

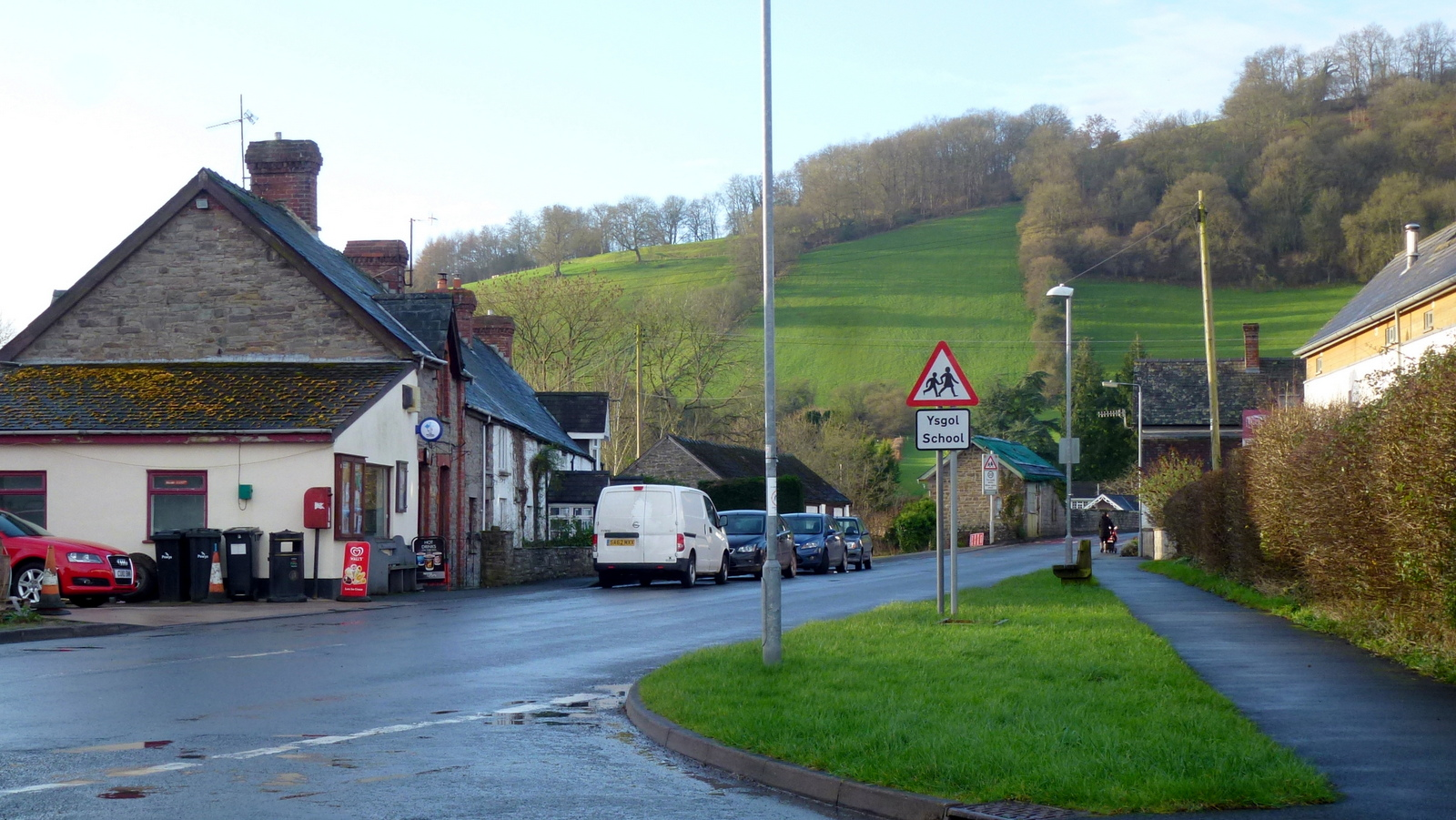
Boughrood

Boughrood (Welsh: Bochrwyd) is a village in the community of Glasbury in Powys, Wales. Until 1983 Boughrood was a community itself.

Historically in Radnorshire, the village is situated near the River Wye between Hay-on-Wye and Builth Wells.

The River Wye passes to the west and north of the village, and a bridge connects Boughrood to Llyswen, a small village south of the river.

The village's church, St Cynog's, was built in 1854 on the site of a medieval graveyard. In 2004 the church had a new spire built, to replace one that was declared unsafe and demolished in the 1970s. The first wedding under the new spire took place on 10 June 2006. In the grounds of the church is The Dead house which is the only surviving Parish Mortuary in Wales.

Thomas Bingham, Baron Bingham of Cornhill (1933–2010), an eminent judge and jurist, is buried at St Cynog's.

Boughrood Castle was in the village, by the 19th century only a moat and part of a wall survived, however a house also called Boughrood Castle was built on the site.

Boughrood & Llyswen railway station, on the Mid-Wales Railway, was closed by British Railways in 1962.

Boughrood hosts the annual Llyswen & Boughrood Agricultural Show - it is usually held on the 3rd Saturday in August.

== Notable people ==
Wales international footballer Caesar Jenkyns was born in Boughrood in 1866.
