= Doldowlod railway station =

Former railway station in Powys, Wales

Doldowlod
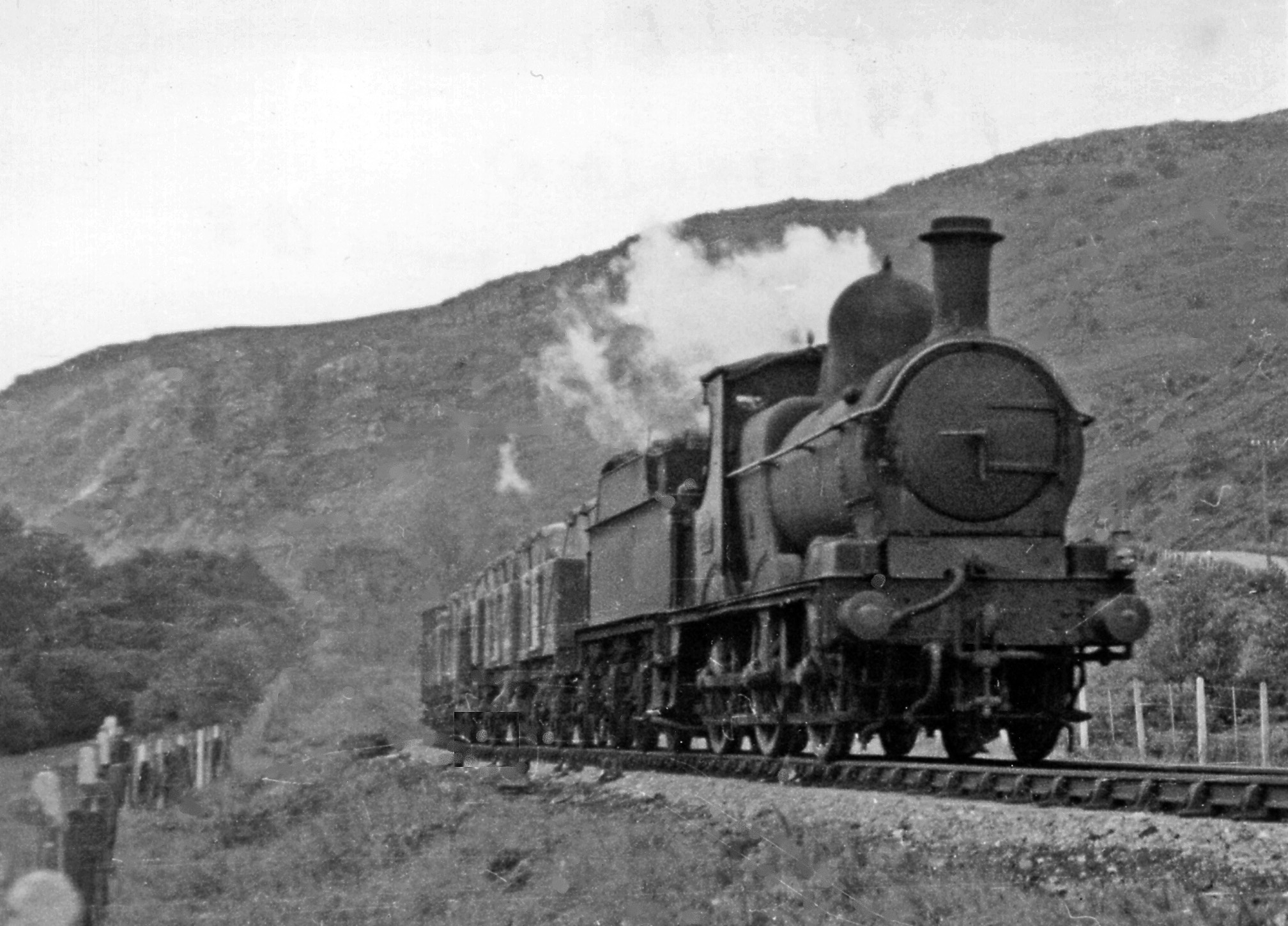
- Southbound goods train near Doldowlod

General information
- Location: Doldowlod, Powys; Wales
- Coordinates: 52.2584°N 3.4975°W
- Grid reference: SN978633
- Platforms: 2

Other information
- Status: Disused

History
- Original company: Mid Wales Railway
- Pre-grouping: Cambrian Railways
- Post-grouping: Great Western Railway

Key dates
- 21 September 1864: Opened
- 31 December 1962: Closed
Location

Doldowlod railway station stood on the Mid Wales Railway between Builth Wells and Rhayader. It was closed on 31 December 1962 and the track removed.

== History ==
Doldowlod on Wye railway station was opened by the Mid-Wales Railway on 21 September 1864. The Mid Wales Railway got into financial difficulties and a working arrangement was made with the Cambrian Railways on 2 April 1888; who took over the line on 24 June 1904. The line later became part of the Great Western Railway.

The station along with the rest of the former Mid Wales Railway line was closed by the British Transport Commission on 31 December 1962.

Preceding station	Disused railways	Following station
Rhayader; Line and station closed	Cambrian Railways; Mid Wales Railway	Newbridge on Wye; Line and station closed
