= Newbridge-on-Wye =

Village in Powys, Wales

Coordinates: 52.214°N 3.442°W

Newbridge-on-Wye: Welsh: Y Bontnewydd-ar-Wy
- Location within Powys
- OS grid reference: SO016583
- Community: Llanyre
- Principal area: Powys
- Preserved county: Powys
- Country: Wales
- Sovereign state: United Kingdom
- Post town: LLANDRINDOD WELLS
- Postcode district: LD1
- Dialling code: 01597
- Police: Dyfed-Powys
- Fire: Mid and West Wales
- Ambulance: Welsh
- UK Parliament: Brecon, Radnor and Cwm Tawe
- Senedd Cymru – Welsh Parliament: Brecon & Radnorshire

Newbridge-on-Wye (Welsh: Y Bontnewydd-ar-Wy) is a small village in Powys, Wales. It lies, as its name suggests, on the River Wye, just downstream from the market town of Rhayader, and in the community of Llanyre.

== Location ==
Newbridge-on-Wye is located roughly in the middle of Wales, and lies 7.1 miles south of Rhayader. The main road running through the village is the A470, running from Rhayader to the north and Builth Wells to the south. The B4358 also passes through the village; it runs from Beulah in the west through to Llandrindod Wells in the east. This road system is useful for commuters travelling from west and north-west Wales to areas in the south.

== History ==
Newbridge-on-Wye was historically a stop off point for drovers, who moved livestock from place to place. Newbridge-on-Wye proved to be an ideal location for drovers to stop and rest because it afforded a safe crossing-point on the river Wye. This led to a settlement forming, including a large number of pubs. This fact is celebrated by the statue of a drover on the village green. Newbridge-on-Wye also sited a railway station on the Mid-Wales Railway, until its closure on 31 December 1962. The site of the station is now occupied by a housing estate, although the old railway bridge still remains.

== Newbridge-on-Wye Football Club ==
Newbridge-on-Wye F.C. played in the Mid Wales League but folded in 2021. The team's greatest success was during the 2004–05 season where they won the Mid Wales South League.

== Newbridge-on-Wye Church In Wales Primary School ==
There has been a primary school present in Newbridge-on-Wye since 1868. The original school was subsequently replaced by a larger school in 1962. The second school was larger than the previous one, although it still remained relatively small, educating around 80 children in four main classrooms. It is situated just off the main road (A470) and has a large grass playing area at the back of the school. In March 2008 Powys County Council announced that the second school was to be demolished, and a £2.5-million replacement to be built at the same site. Although the initial plan was to renovate the old school the council concluded that it would be more cost effective to build an entirely new one, that will accommodate around 118 pupils and will acquire a lower environmental impact (purportedly a 40% reduced energy consumption). Demolition of the old building started in the summer of 2008, and the new school opened in 2009.

Across the road is the All Saints Church, with which the school is linked. The school holds festivals and services in the church throughout the year.
