= Llanelwedd =

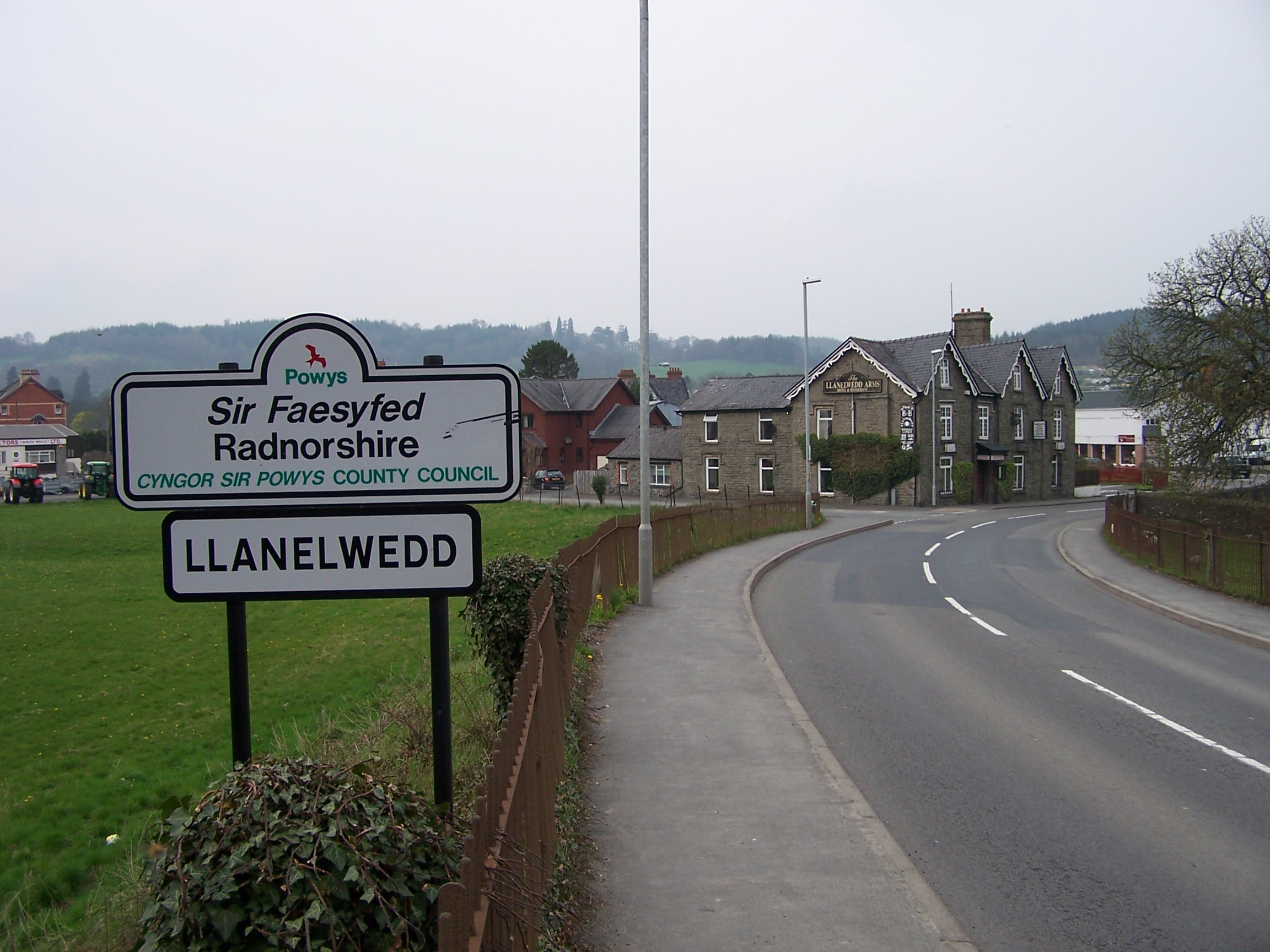
- Entering Llanelwedd from the River Wye bridge to the south

- Location within Powys
- Population: 426 (2011)
- OS grid reference: SO046517
- Principal area: Powys
- Preserved county: Powys
- Country: Wales
- Sovereign state: United Kingdom
- Post town: Builth Wells
- Postcode district: LD2
- Dialling code: 01982
- Police: Dyfed-Powys
- Fire: Mid and West Wales
- Ambulance: Welsh
- UK Parliament: Brecon, Radnor and Cwm Tawe
- Senedd Cymru – Welsh Parliament: Brecon & Radnorshire
- List of places UK Wales Powys 52.15587°N 3.39529°W Community map: Map of the community

Llanelwedd ([ɬanˈɛlwɛð]) is a village and community near Builth Wells, in Powys, Wales. It lies within the historic county of Radnorshire. Llanelwedd features the Royal Welsh Showground.

== Location and geography ==
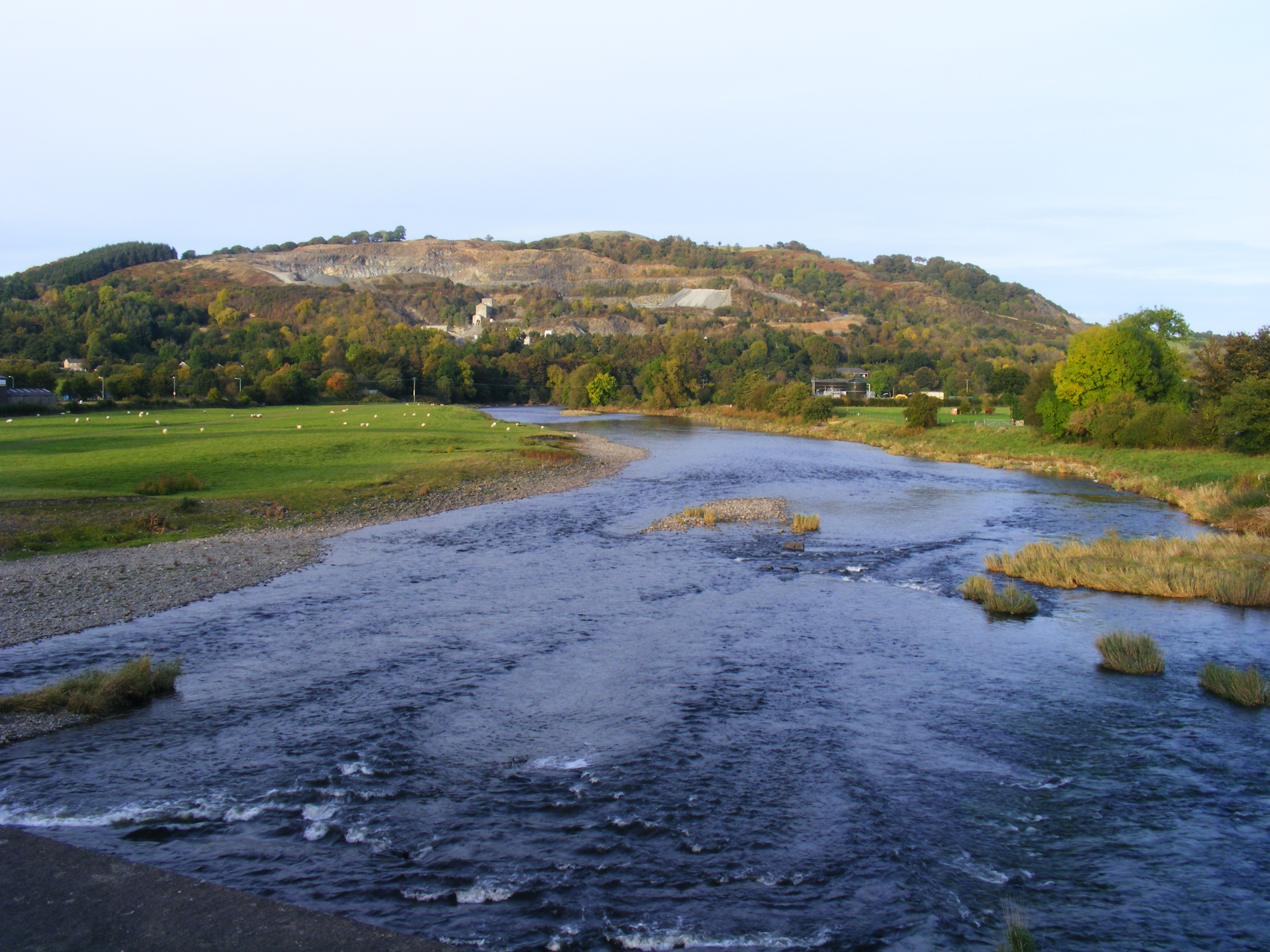
Llanelwedd quarries from the bridge across the River Wye

Llanelwedd is on the right bank of the Wye concentrated immediately north of Builth Wells. Here meet the A470 (from Rhayader), the A483 (from Llandrindod Wells and Welshpool), and the A481 (from Worcester). Being more populous, Builth dominates in the general perception of the area, and Llanelwedd's main network of streets can be perceived as part of the town rather than its own village.

A station named after its neighbour, Builth Wells, was opened in the village on the former Mid-Wales Railway from Newtown to Brecon which ran through the village. This has since closed and nothing remains. The former site is used to access the fairground. The nearest mainline station is now Builth Road which is around two miles away.

The local stone is suitable for various uses, and the Llanelwedd Quarries dominate the landscape on the north-east side of the village.

The community includes the hamlets of Llanfaredd and Builth Road.

== Governance ==
A Llanelwedd electoral ward exists, which includes the communities of Llanelwedd, Aberedw and Glascwm. At the 2011 Census this ward had a population of 1,206. Since 1999 the ward has elected a county councillor to Powys County Council.

== Features of the village ==
Llanelwedd is the site of the Royal Welsh Showground, which hosts a number of attractions during the year as well as the show. It hosted the National Eisteddfod in 1993.

The village church is at the east end of the village, near the junction of the A481 and A483.

Llanelwedd has one Primary School – Llanelwedd Church in Wales School. This has 4 mixed age classes: Dosbarth Coch has nursery and reception, Dosbarth Gwyrdd has years 1 and 2, Dosbarth Melyn has years 3 and 4, whilst Dosbarth Glas has years 5 and 6.

== Gallery ==
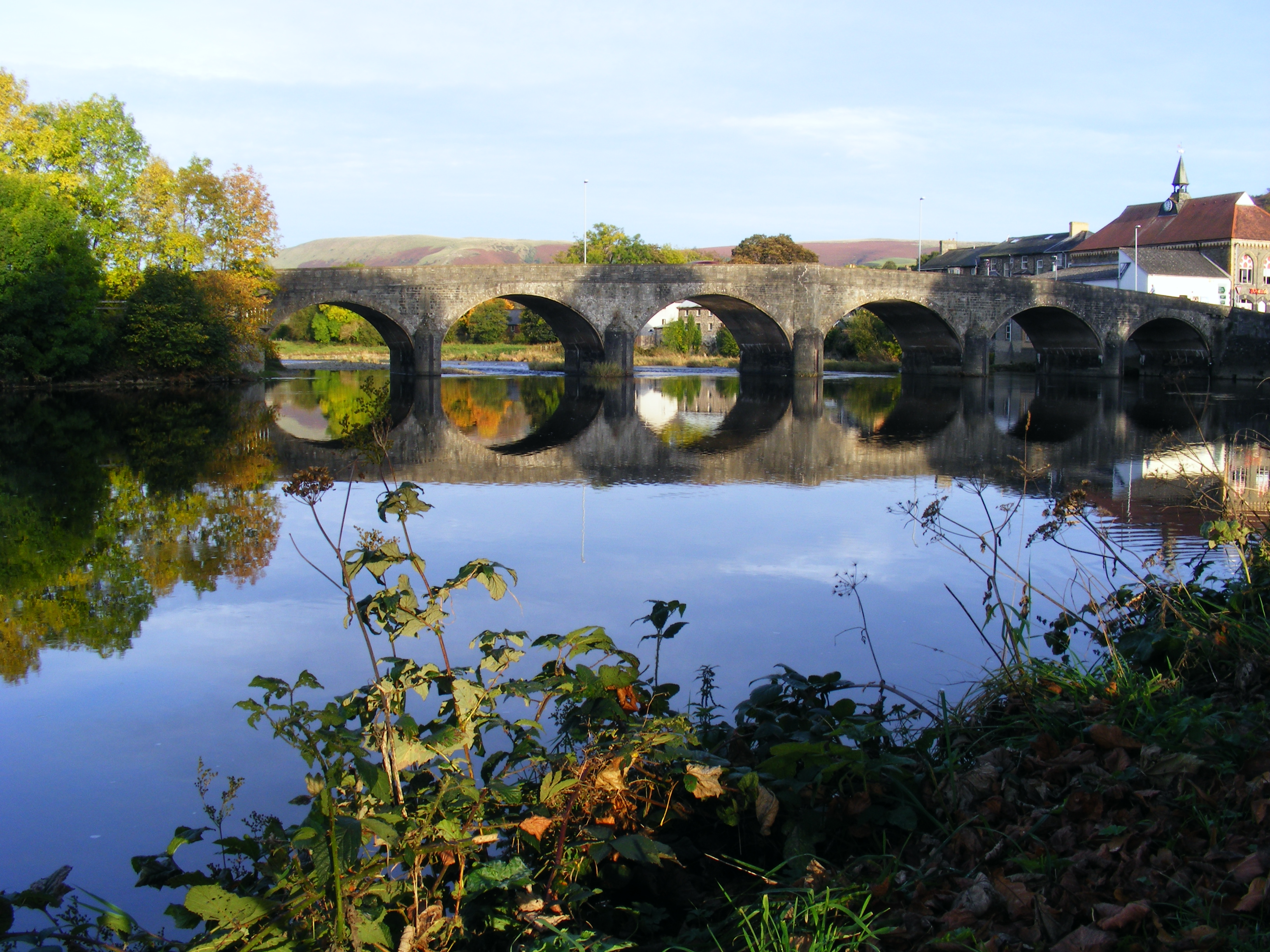
Bridge across the Wye between Llanelwedd and Builth Wells

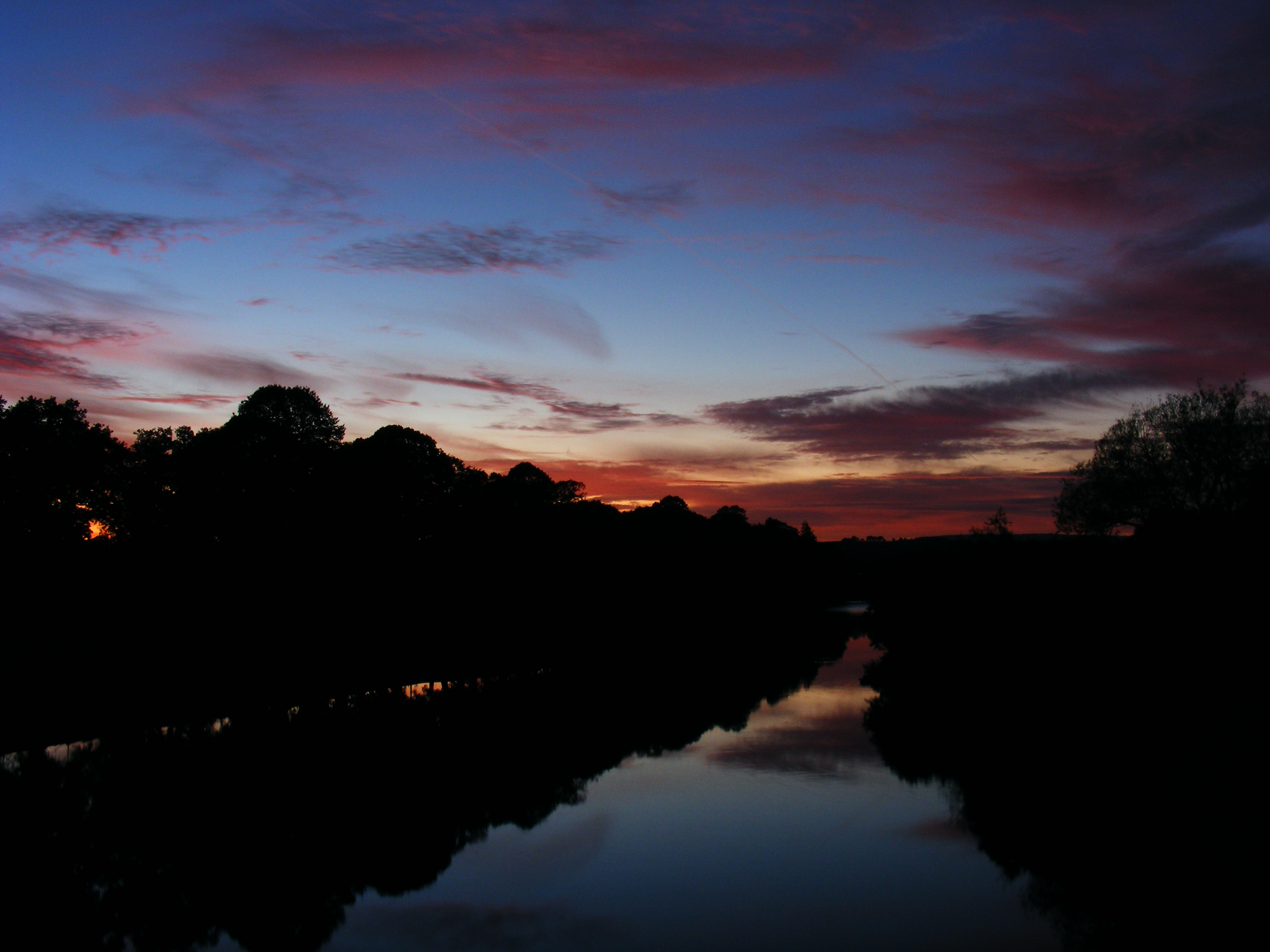
Sunset scene on the Wye between Llanelwedd and Builth Wells
