= St Harmon =

Village and community in Powys, Wales

- Village and community
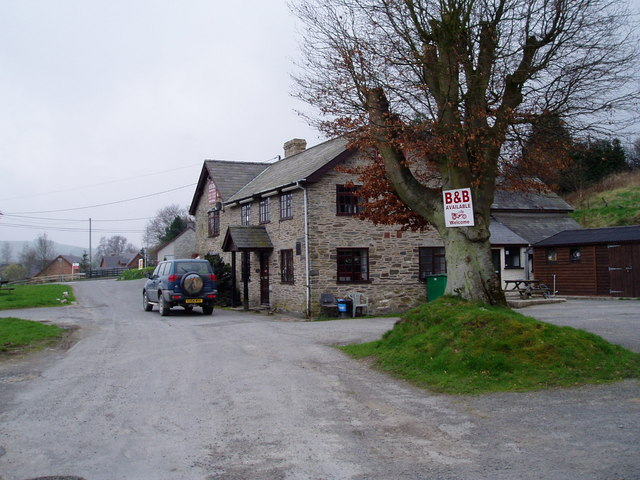
- Sun Inn, the local pub

- Location within Powys
- Principal area: Powys
- Country: Wales
- Sovereign state: United Kingdom
- Post town: RHAYADER
- Postcode district: LD6
- Dialling code: 01597
- Police: Dyfed-Powys
- Fire: Mid and West Wales
- Ambulance: Welsh
- List of places UK Wales Powys 52.3440°N 3.4861°W Community map: Map of the community

St Harmon (Welsh: Llanarmon standardised as Saint Harmon bilingually) is a village and community in Radnorshire, Powys, Wales. The population of the community at the 2011 census was 593. It is located on the Afon Marteg on the B4518 road running between Llanidloes and Rhayader. The parish church is called Saint Garmon (Germanus of Auxerre), with many people assuming it has been spelt incorrectly. In fact, the village name of St Harmon is a further Anglicisation of the name St Garmon. St Garmon's Church is known for having the diarist the Reverend Francis Kilvert serve as Vicar there between 1876 and 1877. It did have its own railway station- St Harmons railway station.

The community also includes the settlements of Pantydwr and Nantgwyn.

St Harmon FC is the village football team. The Sun Inn was the village pub but has now been converted to a home.
