= Boughrood & Llyswen railway station =

Disused railway station in Wales

Boughrood & Llyswen
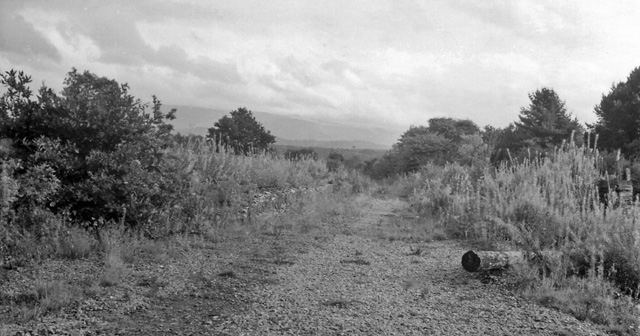
- The site of the station in 1967

General information
- Location: Boughrood, Powys; Wales
- Coordinates: 52.0418°N 3.2712°W
- Grid reference: SO128389
- Platforms: 2

Other information
- Status: Disused

History
- Original company: Mid-Wales Railway
- Pre-grouping: Cambrian Railways
- Post-grouping: Great Western Railway

Key dates
- 21 September 1864: Opened
- 31 December 1962: Closed
Location

Boughrood and Llyswen railway station, in Boughrood, Powys, Wales, was opened on 21 September 1864 by the Mid-Wales Railway as Boughrood Station, although excursions ran on 19 September and 20 September. It became Boughrood and Llyswen station on 1 October 1912 while under the ownership of the Cambrian Railways. On a single track main line, it had a passing loop with platforms on either side and a signal box at the northern end of the platform to Moat Lane Junction. The station closed on 31 December 1962.

Preceding station	Disused railways	Following station
Llanstephan Halt; Line and station closed	Cambrian Railways; Mid-Wales Railway	Three Cocks Junction; Line and station closed
