= Glasbury-on-Wye railway station =

Former railway station in Powys, Wales

Glasbury-on-Wye
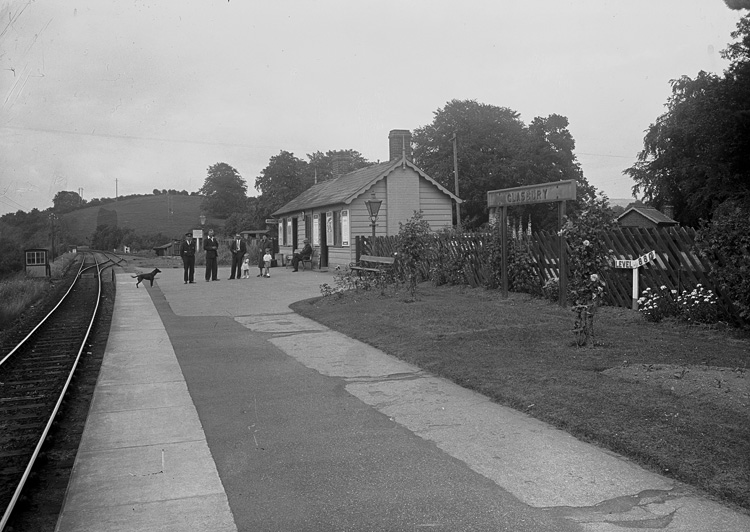
- Glasbury railway station

General information
- Location: Glasbury, Powys; Wales
- Coordinates: 52.0431°N 3.1961°W
- Grid reference: SO179390

Other information
- Status: Disused

History
- Original company: Hereford, Hay and Brecon Railway
- Pre-grouping: Midland Railway
- Post-grouping: London, Midland and Scottish Railway

Key dates
- 19 September 1864: Opened as Glasbury
- 1 February 1894: renamed Glasbury-on-Wye
- 1962: Closed
Location

Glasbury-on-Wye railway station was a station at Glasbury, Powys, Wales. The station closed in 1962.

During the station's life it was in Breconshire, whereas the village it served was across the Wye in Radnorshire. Both counties were taken into Powys after the station closed.

Preceding station	Disused railways	Following station
Three Cocks Junction; Line and station closed	London, Midland and Scottish Railway; Hereford, Hay and Brecon Railway	Hay-on-Wye; Line and station closed
