= Three Cocks Junction railway station =

Former railway station in Powys, Wales

Three Cocks Junction
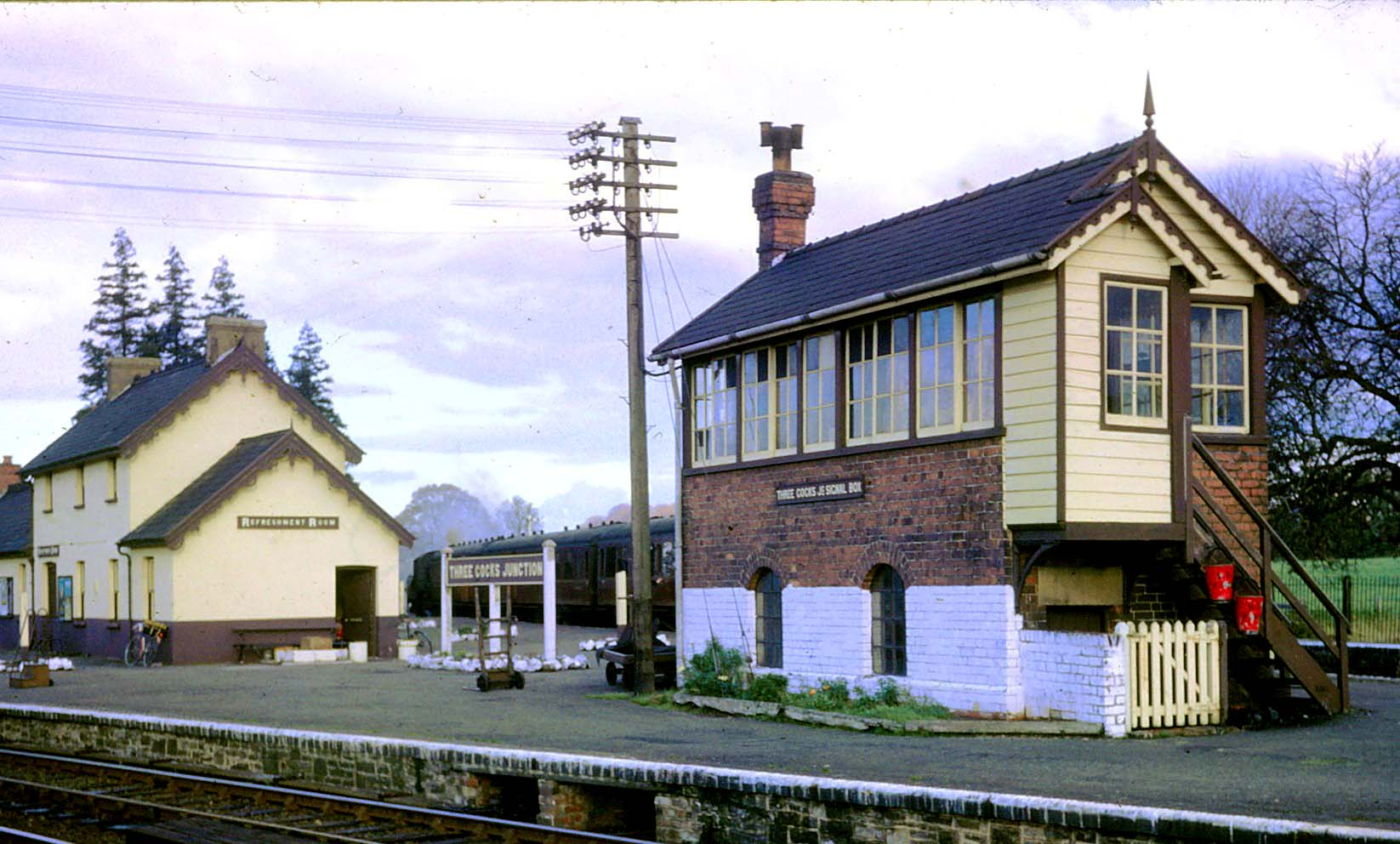
- Three Cocks Junction in 1960

General information
- Location: Three Cocks (Aberllynfi), Powys; Wales
- Coordinates: 52.0274°N 3.2152°W
- Platforms: 4

History
- Previous names: Three Cocks
- Original company: Hereford, Hay and Brecon Railway
- Pre-grouping: Cambrian Railways
- Post-grouping: Great Western Railway

Key dates
- 1864: Opened
- 1962: Closed
Location

Three Cocks Junction railway station (colloquially as Lucky Man Junction) was a station in Three Cocks, Powys, Wales. The station closed in 1962. The station had a signal box.

Preceding station	Disused railways	Following station
Boughrood & Llyswen; Line and station closed	Cambrian Railways; Mid-Wales Railway	Talgarth; Line and station closed
Glasbury-on-Wye; Line and station closed	Midland Railway; Hereford, Hay and Brecon Railway	Talgarth; Line and station closed
