= St Harmons railway station =

Former railway station in Wales

St Harmons
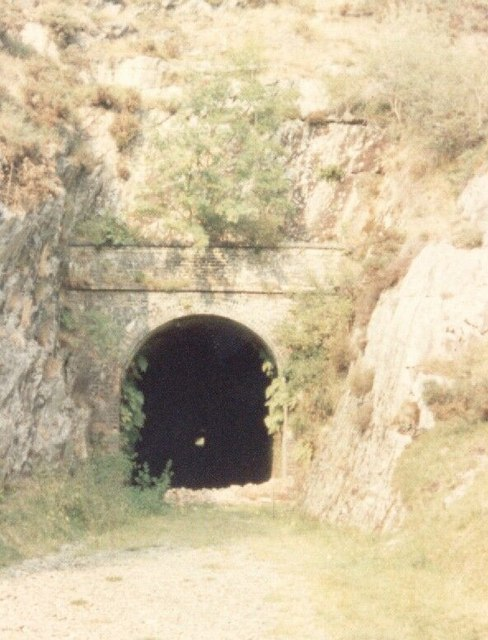
- Gilfach (St Harmons) Tunnel near St. Harmons, this is the only remaining trace of the former railway at St Harmons

General information
- Location: St Harmon, Powys; Wales
- Coordinates: 52.3443°N 3.4868°W
- Grid reference: SN987728
- Platforms: 1

Other information
- Status: Disused

History
- Original company: Mid-Wales Railway
- Pre-grouping: Cambrian Railways
- Post-grouping: Great Western Railway

Key dates
- 1872: Opened
- 1936: Downgraded
- 1962: Closed
Location

St Harmons railway station was a station in St Harmon, Powys, Wales. The station opened in 1872 and closed in 1962.

Preceding station	Disused railways	Following station
Pantydwr; Line and station closed	Cambrian Railways; Mid-Wales Railway	Marteg Halt; Line and station closed
