= Cwmdauddwr =

Village in Powys, Wales

Coordinates: 52.2984°N 3.5167°W

- Location within Powys
- Community: Rhayader
- Principal area: Powys
- Preserved county: Powys
- Country: Wales
- Sovereign state: United Kingdom
- Police: Dyfed-Powys
- Fire: Mid and West Wales
- Ambulance: Welsh

Cwmdauddwr (rarely referred to by its correct full name of Llansanffraid Cwmteuddwr) is a village in Powys, Wales. It is contiguous with the town of Rhayader on the opposite side of the River Wye. The village is located on the B4518 road linking Rhayader with the Elan Valley Reservoirs. Until 1983 Llansanffraid Cwmdeuddwr was a community.

Map of the Cantrefs and Commotes of Rhwng Gwy a Hafren (Cwmwd Deuddwr is shown as Elenydd)

The parish of Cwmdauddwr corresponds approximately to the medieval commote of Cwmwd Deuddwr (Welsh for 'Commote of the Confluence'; lit. 'commote of the two waters'). It was so called because of its location where the rivers Elan and Wye join. It has also been referred to as Elenydd and Elenid. It was in the area known as Rhwng Gwy a Hafren. It was also associated with Gwrtheyrnion on the east of the Wye, together they formed a cantref. This commote should not be confused with the commote of Deuddwr in Ystlyg which is also in Powys.

The village is home to a pub (The Triangle Inn), village hall and a parish church dedicated to St Bride (Welsh: Sant Ffraid).

The Groe, a large park on the banks of the river, has walks, play areas and sports pitches.

Rhayader railway station was situated in the village until its closure in 1963.

== Church ==
St Bride's church is Victorian and set in an extensive graveyard. It contains some older memorials and some of the foundations of an earlier church, that stood on the same site, are still traceable in the churchyard near the east wall.

Emmeline Lewis Lloyd is buried here, and the church has a memorial. The plaque was saved from Nantgwyllt church when the Elan Valley was flooded between 1896 and 1905 to create the Caban Coch reservoir, it notes that Lewis Lloyd was the eighth woman to climb Mont Blanc.
