= Jonathan Williams (antiquary) =

Welsh clergyman, schoolmaster and antiquarian writer

Jonathan Williams (c. 1752 – 19 August 1829) was a Welsh clergyman, schoolmaster and antiquarian writer.

He was born at Rhayader, some time between 1752 and 1754, the son of a draper, and had two brothers who also went into the church. He studied at Pembroke College, Oxford, going on to teach at the grammar school in Leominster on the English-Welsh border. He was also curate of nearby Eyton. At Leominster he got married, and had two daughters.

== Works ==
- History of Leominster
- History of Radnorshire (1905) (posthumously published)

== Sources ==
- Welsh Biography Online
