= Royal Welsh Show =

Annual agricultural show in Wales

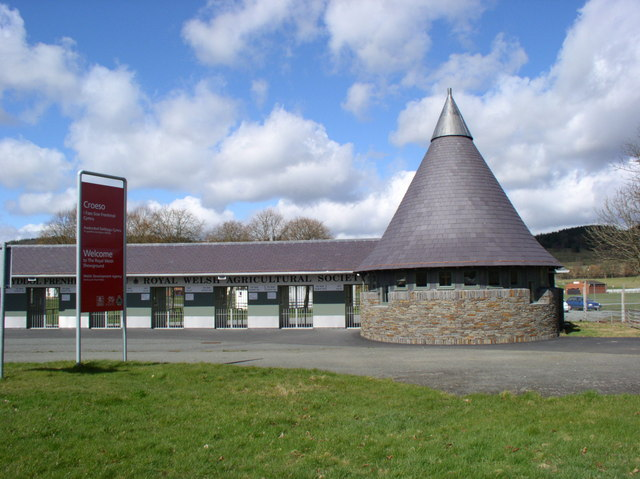
Royal Welsh Agricultural Show Ground, Llanelwedd

The Royal Welsh Show (Welsh: Sioe Frenhinol Cymru) is an agricultural show, organised by the Royal Welsh Agricultural Society (originally, the Welsh National Agricultural Society, formed 26 February 1904 by influential landowners, at Committee Room 12 at the House of Commons), and first held in 1904. It takes place in July of each year, at Llanelwedd, near Builth Wells, in Powys, Mid Wales.

The first show was held in Aberystwyth in 1904, on the Vicarage Field,

Godfrey Morgan, 1st Viscount Tredegar was elected president of Welsh National Agricultural Society in 1913.

On 22 November 1922, George V became Patron and the Edward VIII, Prince of Wales became Honorary President, and the name was changed to the Royal Welsh Agricultural Society.

It was held in a different town, every year in July, alternating between the north and the south, with a permanent showground at Llanelwedd near Builth Wells, first used on 23 July 1963.

No show was held in 1915–18 (WWI), 1940–45 (WWII) nor 2020–21 (COVID-19 pandemic). The latter years saw some events going virtual.

== Format ==
The show lasts for four days and attracts more than 200,000 visitors annually, boosting tourism in Wales.

Events include:

- Judging of cattle, sheep, horses, goats, pigs and various other domestic animals
- Sheepdog trials
- Sheep shearing competitions
- Horse riding competitions
- Four-in-hand and Carriage Driving displays
- Falconry
- Games and sports such as the King's Troop, Royal Horse Artillery of the Royal Horse Artillery
- Arts and crafts show
- Live music

Given its "Royal" status it is not unusual for a senior member of the British Royal family to attend at the Show. Charles III was a familiar sight as Prince of Wales. Following his support during the 2001 foot and mouth crisis, one farming union, the FUW, nominated him for his outstanding contribution to agriculture in 2003, which was announced at the show.

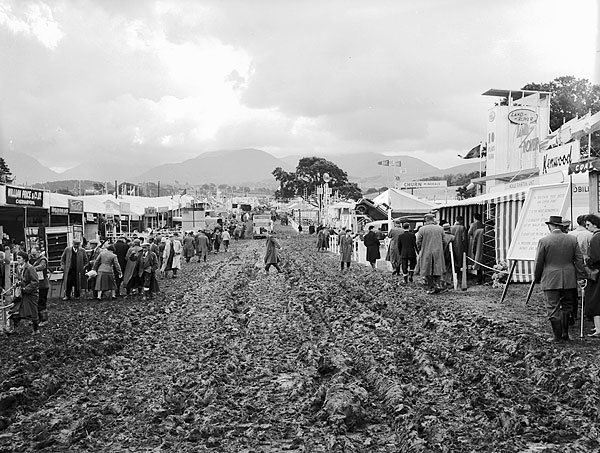
The Royal Welsh Agricultural Show at Bangor, 1958.

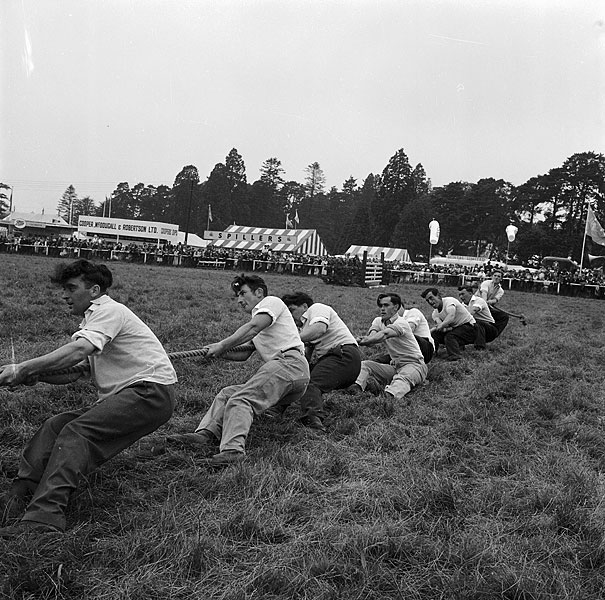
The Royal Welsh Show 1963, Llanelwedd.

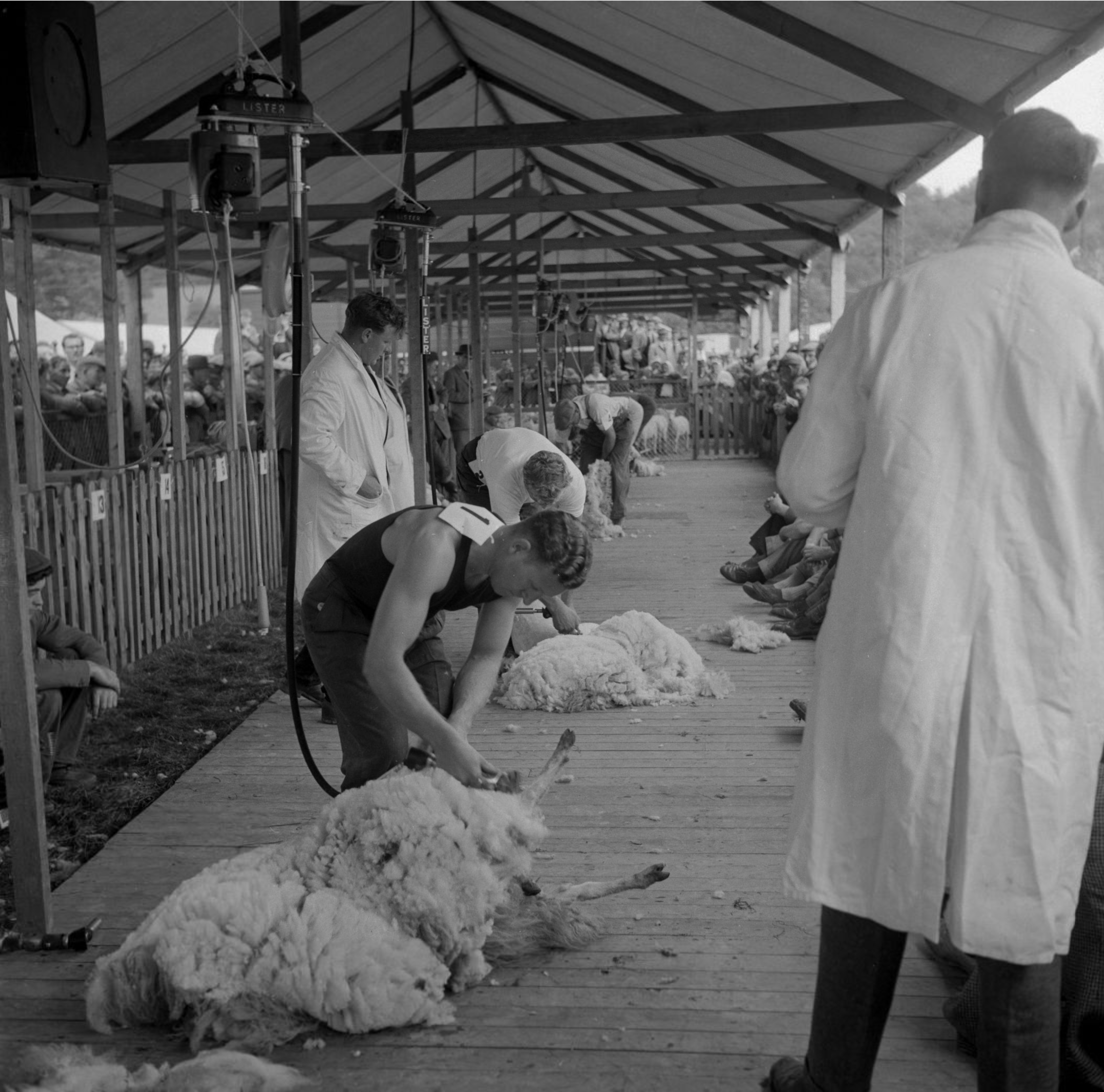
The Royal Welsh Show 1963, Llanelwedd

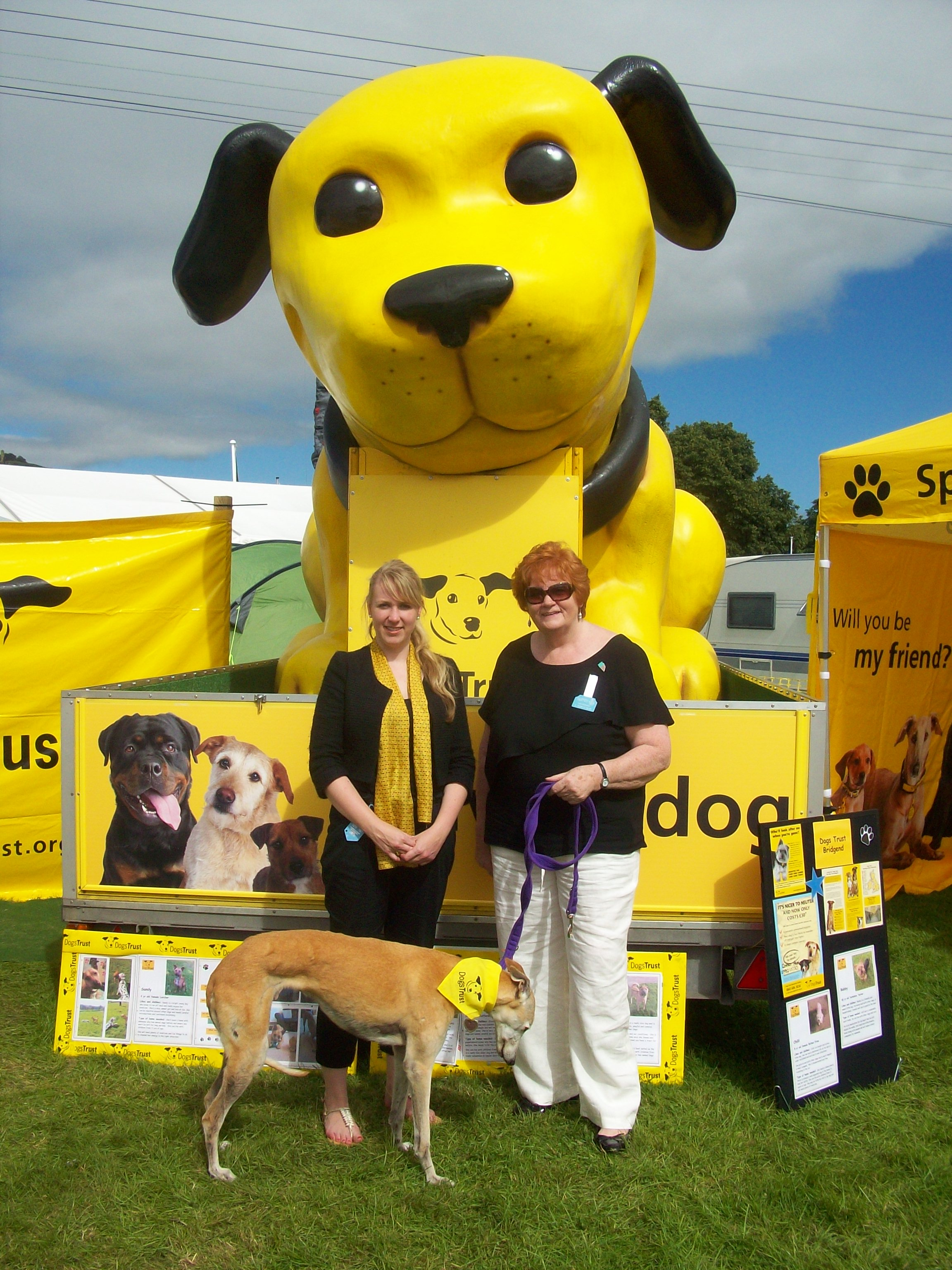
The Presiding Officer of Senedd Cymru – Welsh Parliament at the 2012 Royal Welsh Show

== Business ==
Businesses with links to agriculture will have a trade stand at the show. It is an opportunity to attract new business from the farming community as well as to network with current customers.

== Young Farmers ==
The Royal Welsh Show is also an event for young people who live in farming communities in Wales. The Wales Federation of Young Farmers' Clubs runs a series of competitions across Wales throughout the year, and the finals of the practical competitions usually take place at the Show. Amongst these events are stock judging and tractor driving.

== Welsh Cob Senior Stallions class ==
The Welsh Cob Senior Stallion class is traditionally held on the Wednesday afternoon of the show ("Welsh Cob Wednesday"). The class is held using the entire main arena. The fifty-plus stallions are paraded at the trot in front of the grandstand before they settle down for the judging of the class.

== Rail access ==
Linked via the Heart of Wales Line station of Builth Road, where connecting buses link with the Transport for Wales service during show times.

== See also ==
- List of Royal Shows
- Royal Show former English agricultural show
