= Pantydwr railway station =

Former railway station in Powys, Wales

Pantydwr
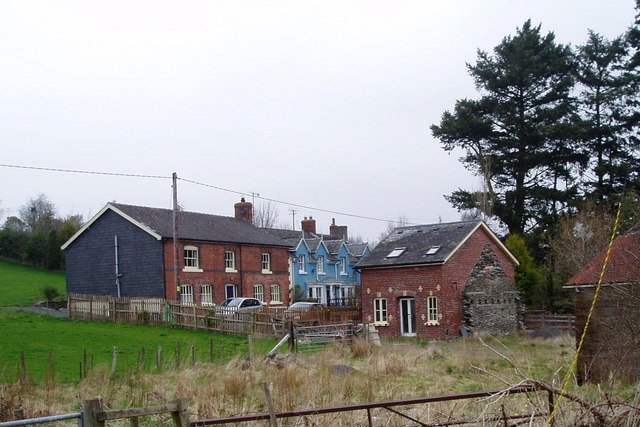
- Old railway station at Pant y Dwr

General information
- Location: North of St Harmon, Powys; Wales
- Coordinates: 52.3611°N 3.4948°W
- Grid reference: SN982747
- Platforms: 2

Other information
- Status: Disused

History
- Original company: Mid-Wales Railway
- Pre-grouping: Cambrian Railways
- Post-grouping: Great Western Railway

Key dates
- 1864: Opened
- 1962: Closed
Location

Pantydwr railway station was a station to the north of St Harmon, Powys, Wales. The station was opened in 1864. The station was built at the highest point on the Mid-Wales Railway's line at 974 ft (297 m) above sea level.

Preceding station	Disused railways	Following station
Glan-yr-Afon Halt; Line and station closed	Cambrian Railways; Mid-Wales Railway	St Harmons; Line and station closed
