= Llanstephan Halt railway station =

Former railway station in Wales

Llanstephan Halt

General information
- Location: Llanstephan, Powys; Wales
- Coordinates: 52.0662°N 3.2933°W
- Grid reference: SO113417
- Platforms: 1

Other information
- Status: Disused

History
- Original company: Great Western Railway
- Post-grouping: Great Western Railway

Key dates
- 6 March 1933: Opened
- 31 December 1962: Closed
Location

Llanstephan Halt railway station, in Llanstephan, Powys, Wales, was opened by the Great Western Railway on 6 March 1933. The nameboard stated Llanstephen Radnor Halt. It was closed by British Railways on 31 December 1962.

Preceding station	Disused railways	Following station
Erwood; Line and station closed	Great Western Railway; Mid-Wales Railway	Boughrood & Llyswen; Line and station closed
