= Rhayader railway station =

Railway station in Powys, Wales

Rhayader
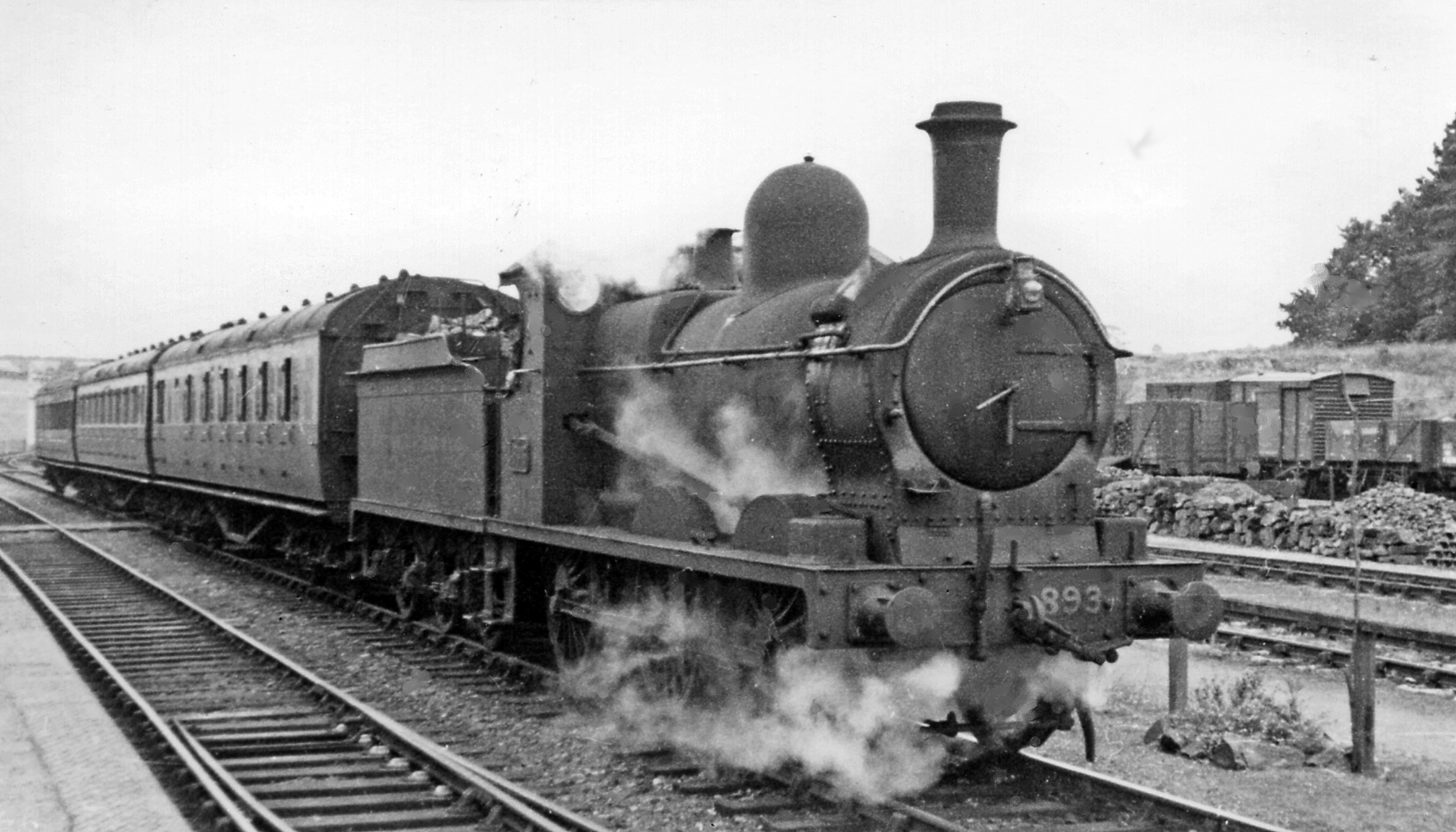
- Local train entering the station in 1949

General information
- Location: Cwmdauddwr, Powys; Wales
- Coordinates: 52.2999°N 3.5172°W
- Grid reference: SN965679
- Platforms: 2

Other information
- Status: Disused

History
- Original company: Mid Wales
- Pre-grouping: Cambrian Railways
- Post-grouping: Great Western Railway

Key dates
- 21 September 1864: Opened.
- 31 December 1962: Closed.
Location

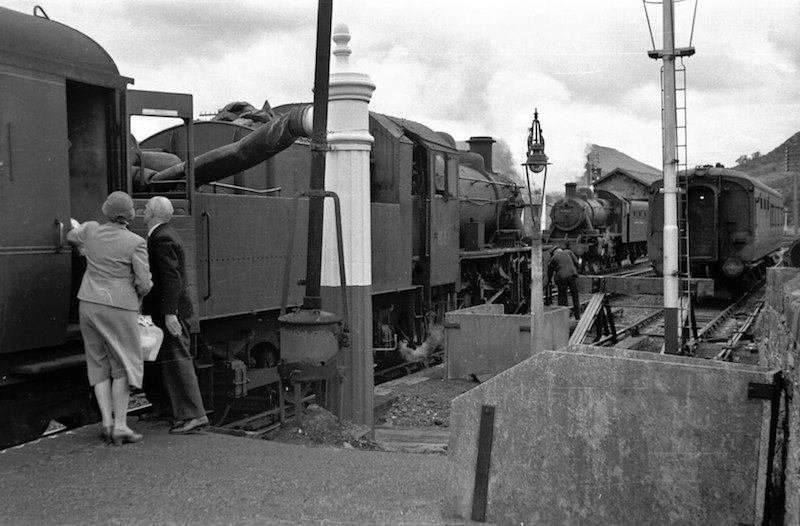
The station in July 1962

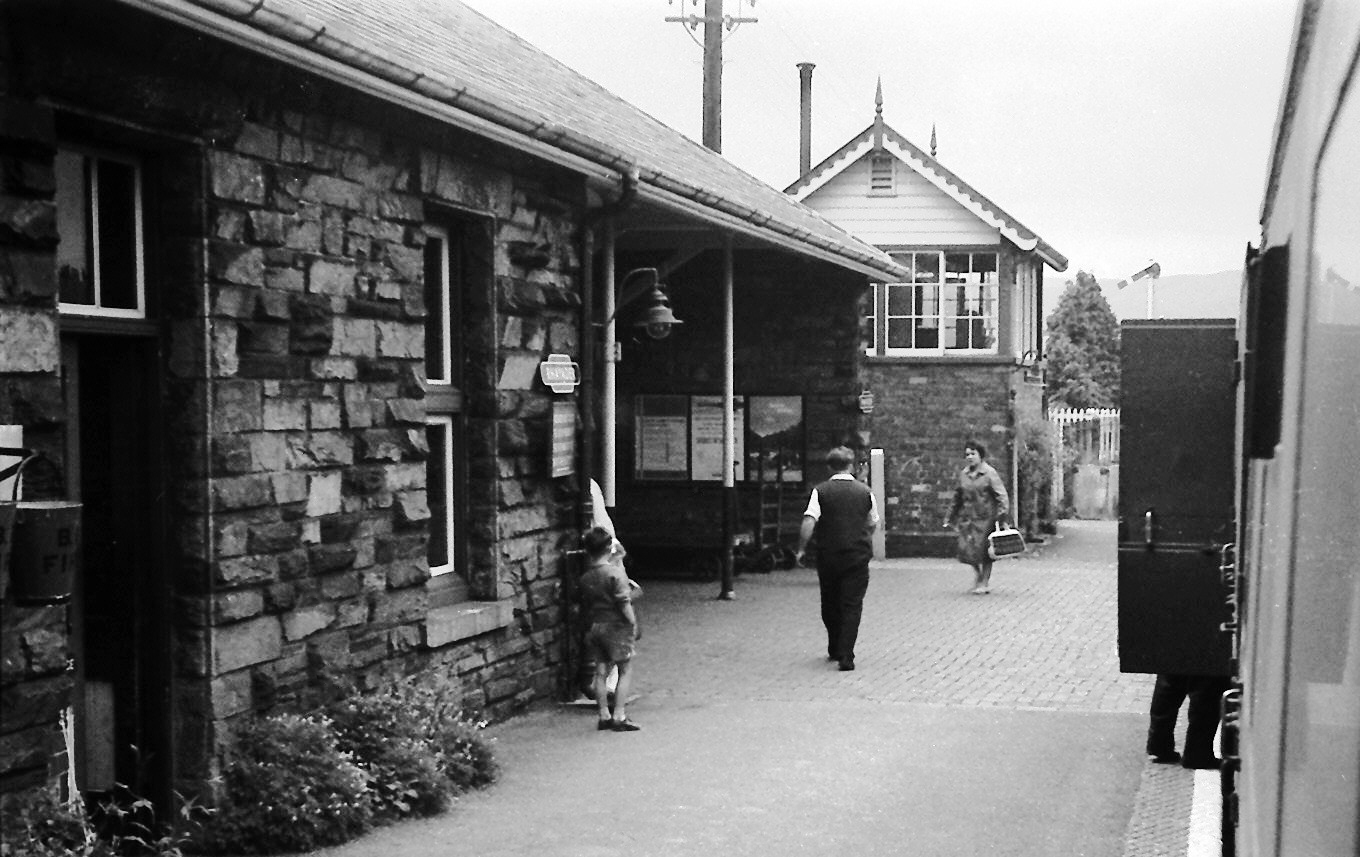
Platform scene shortly before closure

Rhayader railway station was a station serving the town of Rhayader, Powys, on the Mid Wales Railway line.

It was opened in 1864 in Cwmdauddwr, a village on the opposite bank of the River Wye. The line, which took over 5 years to build, was closed in 1962 and dismantled within months.

The station was the junction for the Elan Valley Railway which was in operation between 1896 and 1916.

The site of the station is now occupied by Powys county council's highways department.

| Preceding station | Disused railways | Following station |
|---|---|---|
| Marteg Halt; Line and station closed | Cambrian Railways; Mid Wales Railway | Doldowlod; Line and station closed |
