= Llandrindod railway station =

Railway station in Powys, Wales

Llandrindod
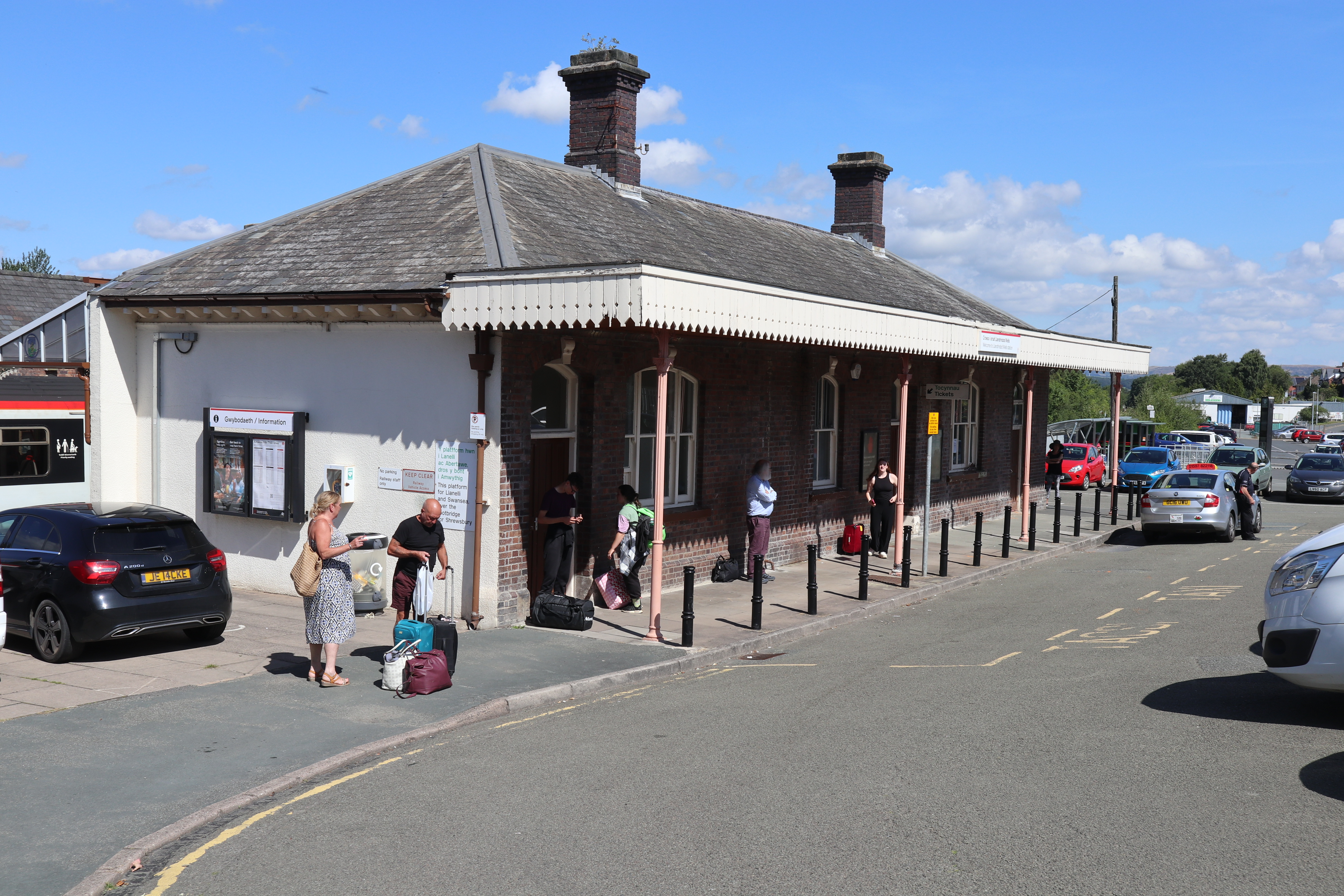
- Llandrindod railway station building (2022)

General information
- Location: Llandrindod Wells, Powys; Wales
- Coordinates: 52.242°N 3.379°W
- Grid reference: SO059613
- Manager: Transport for Wales
- Platforms: 2

Other information
- Station code: LLO
- Classification: DfT category E

History
- Opened: 1 December 1865

Passengers
- 2021/22: ▲18,152
- 2022/23: ▲23,604
- 2023/24: ▲27,280
- 2024/25: ▲30,278
- 2025/26: ▲31,694
Location
Notes
- Passenger statistics from the Office of Rail and Road

Llandrindod railway station serves the town of Llandrindod Wells in Powys, Mid Wales. It is on the Heart of Wales Line between Builth Road and Pen-y-Bont, 31 miles 73 chains (51.4 km) from Craven Arms South Junction.

== History ==
The station seen in 1991

The station was opened in 1865, as the terminus of a branch line from Knighton by the Central Wales Railway which was absorbed by the LNWR soon after completion. Construction of the Central Wales Extension Railway (another LNWR-backed project) southwards towards Llandovery started soon after and upon completion of this line in 1868 placed the town on a through route between Craven Arms and Swansea.

The station was known as Llandrindod Wells between 1867 and May 1980 (when it reverted back to its current name). Additionally, between December 1968 and May 1969, it had the suffix "Halt" added.

The line through the station was singled as an economy measure in the 1960s, although a passing loop was left a short distance to the north, near the town's level crossing. However, the loop was relocated to the station in 1986 by British Rail as part of the signalling modernisation scheme that centralised control at Pantyffynnon. The level crossing was converted to train-crew operation at the same time, whilst the signal box was closed. The redundant no. 2 signal box was relocated to the station in 1990 after closure and was restored to working order as a museum. It stands on the southbound platform and opens to the public at certain times.

The passing-loop point machines were replaced on 22 August 2010, as part of a £5 million Network Rail modernisation scheme to renew the points at all five loops on the route.

On 28 August 2024, a train derailed at low speed at the station.

== Facilities ==
The station has a ticket office sited within the main building on the southbound platform. It is reported to have an independently run ticket office. When the ticket office is closed, tickets may be purchased on the train. There is a waiting room within the buildings on the northbound side and canopies provide a covered waiting area on the southbound side. Digital display screens, customer help points and timetable poster boards are provided on both platforms, which are linked by an accessible ramped footbridge. A pay phone and post box are also provided.

== Passenger volume ==
The station is the busiest intermediate station on the Heart of Wales Line.

Passenger volume at Llandrindod
	2004–05	2005–06	2006–07	2007–08	2008–09	2009–10	2010–11	2011–12	2012–13	2013–14	2014–15	2015–16	2016–17	2017–18	2018–19	2019–20	2020–21	2021–22	2022–23	2023–24	2024–25
Entries and exits	42,992	40,139	38,370	50,093	49,062	47,366	47,732	47,182	42,768	42,958	43,706	39,648	40,768	40,128	40,672	35,858	2,440	18,152	23,604	27,280	30,278

The statistics cover twelve month periods that start in April.

== Services ==
Transport for Wales operates services between Shrewsbury and Swansea on the Heart of Wales line. There are five trains each way on Mondays to Saturdays (plus a sixth to Shrewsbury on weekdays), with two each way on Sundays.

Preceding station	National Rail	Following station
Builth Road	Transport for Wales; Heart of Wales Line	Pen-y-Bont

== Community rail ==
The station, along with all others on the line, is promoted by the Heart of Wales Community Rail Partnership.

== Bibliography ==
- Body, G (1983). PSL Field Guides – Railways of the Western Region. Wellingborough: Patrick Stephens Ltd. ISBN 0-85059-546-0.
- Caton, Peter (2018). Remote Stations. Leicestershire: Matador. ISBN 978-1-78901-408-2.
- Marshall, Geoff; Pipe, Vicki (2018). The Railway Adventures: Places, Trains, People and Stations. September Publishing. ISBN 978-1910463871.
- Quick, Michael (2023). Railway Passenger Stations in Great Britain: A Chronology (PDF) (5th ed.). London: Railway and Canal Historical Society.
