= Builth Road railway station =

Railway station in Powys, Wales

Builth Road
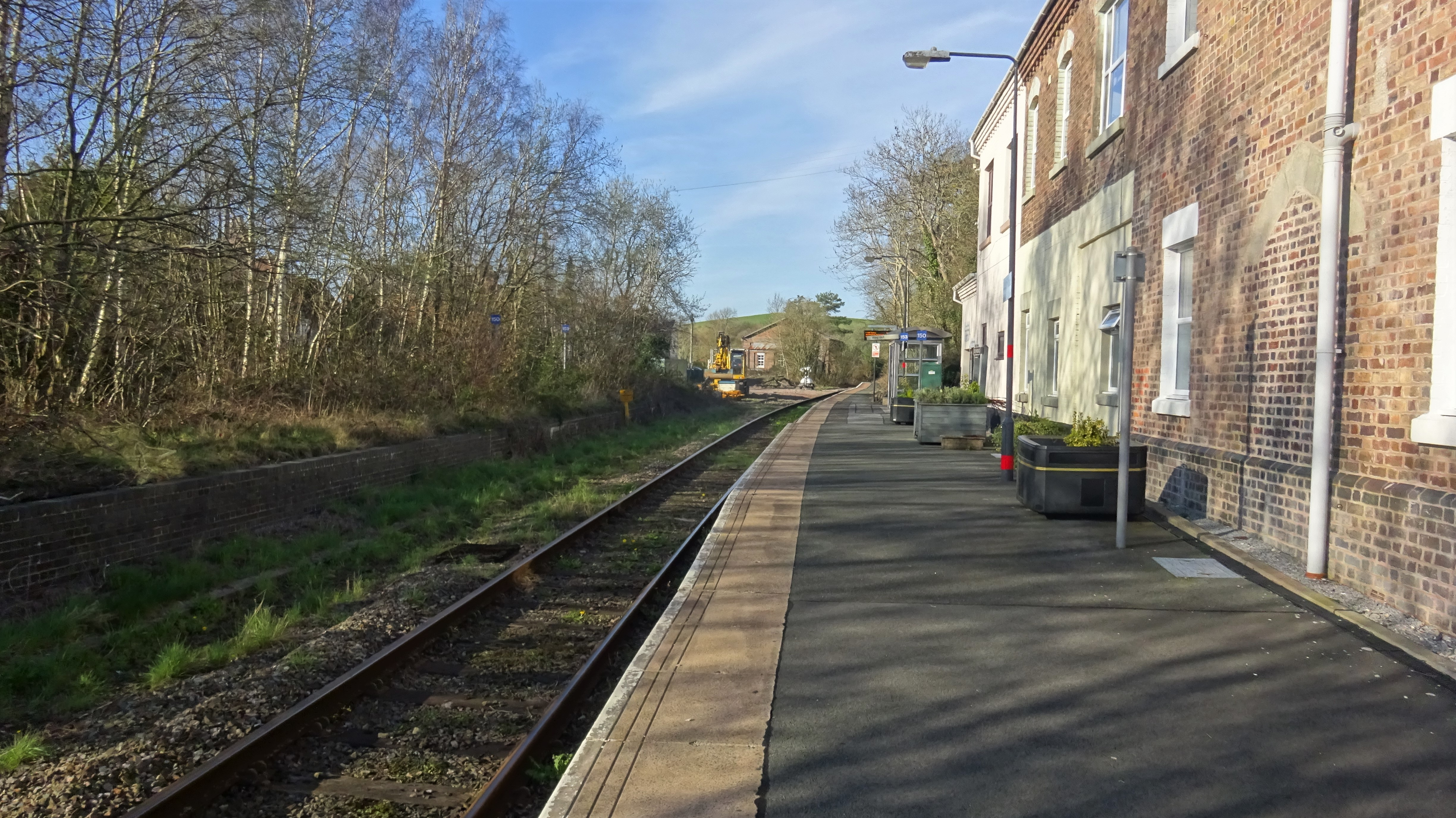
- Builth Road station platform looking north, April 2023

General information
- Location: Builth Wells, Powys; Wales
- Coordinates: 52.1689°N 3.4271°W
- Grid reference: SO024532
- Owner: Network Rail
- Manager: Transport for Wales
- Platforms: 1

Other information
- Station code: BHR
- Classification: DfT category F2

History
- Original company: Mid Wales Railway (Llechryd) and Central Wales Extension Railway (Builth Road)
- Pre-grouping: Cambrian Railways (Low Level) and London & North Western Railway (High Level)
- Post-grouping: Great Western Railway (Low Level) and London, Midland & Scottish Railway (High Level)

Key dates
- 1864: Llechryd station opened
- 1866: Builth Road station opened
- 1889: Llechryd station renamed Builth Road Low Level
- 1962: Low Level platforms closed

Passengers
- 2021/22: ▲2,336
- 2022/23: ▲3,914
- 2023/24: ▲4,638
- 2024/25: ▲5,582
- 2025/26: ▲5,942
Location
Notes
- Passenger statistics from the Office of Rail and Road

Builth Road railway station is a station primarily serving the town of Builth Wells, in mid Wales. It is on the Heart of Wales Line. The station is over 2 miles (3.2 km) northwest of Builth Wells via the A470, a busy trunk road.

The hamlet of Builth Road has developed around the station.

== History ==
The station uses one of the high level platforms of the former interchange station with the earlier Mid Wales Railway (closed 31 December 1962) which served the town of Builth Wells directly on its route from Cardiff to the North. The original (low level) station did not bear the name "Builth Road", instead being given the name "Llechryd". Builth Road was the name subsequently given to the Central Wales Extension Railway's high level station on the line from Llandrindod Wells to Llandovery that opened in 1866. The Mid-Wales Railway station was eventually renamed Builth Road Low Level in 1889. The two routes crossed immediately south of the High Level station on a girder bridge and were at one time connected by lift.

Both the High and Low Level stations had substantial buildings until the mid-1960s, with High Level also having a goods shed (still in existence) and a running loop to accommodate the banking locomotives employed to assist trains on the 1 in 74 climb up from Llandrindod Wells. The former Low Level station buildings also still stand and were used as the former Cambrian Arms public house, whilst those on the remaining active platform at High Level are now used as housing.

== Facilities ==
The station is unstaffed (like most others on the route) and has no ticket machine, so tickets must be purchased in advance or on the train. There is a standard waiting shelter on the platform, along with a digital CIS display, timetable poster board and customer help point at the station entrance. Level access is provided from the entrance to the platform, with a section raised to assist passengers boarding and alighting.

== Services ==
All trains serving the station are operated by Transport for Wales, and it is a request stop. There are five trains a day in each direction from Monday to Saturday, and two services on Sundays. During the Royal Welsh Show, Transport for Wales runs special services with connecting buses to/from the showground on the northern outskirts of Builth Wells.

Preceding station	National Rail	Following station
Cilmeri	Transport for Wales; Heart of Wales Line	Llandrindod
	Historical railways	
Cilmeri; Line and station open	London and North Western Railway; Central Wales Extension Railway	Llandrindod Wells; Line and station open
	Disused railways	
Newbridge on Wye; Line and station closed	Cambrian Railways; Mid-Wales Railway	Builth Wells; Line and station closed

== Bibliography ==
- Mitchell, Vic; Smith, Keith (2007). Brecon to Newtown. West Sussex: Middleton Press. figs. 56-63. ISBN 9781906008062. OCLC 288983659.
- Organ, John (2008). Mitchell, Vic (ed.). Craven Arms to Llandeilo. West Sussex: Middleton Press. figs. 61-75. ISBN 9781906008352. OCLC 648080889.
