= Mid-Wales Railway =

Railway system

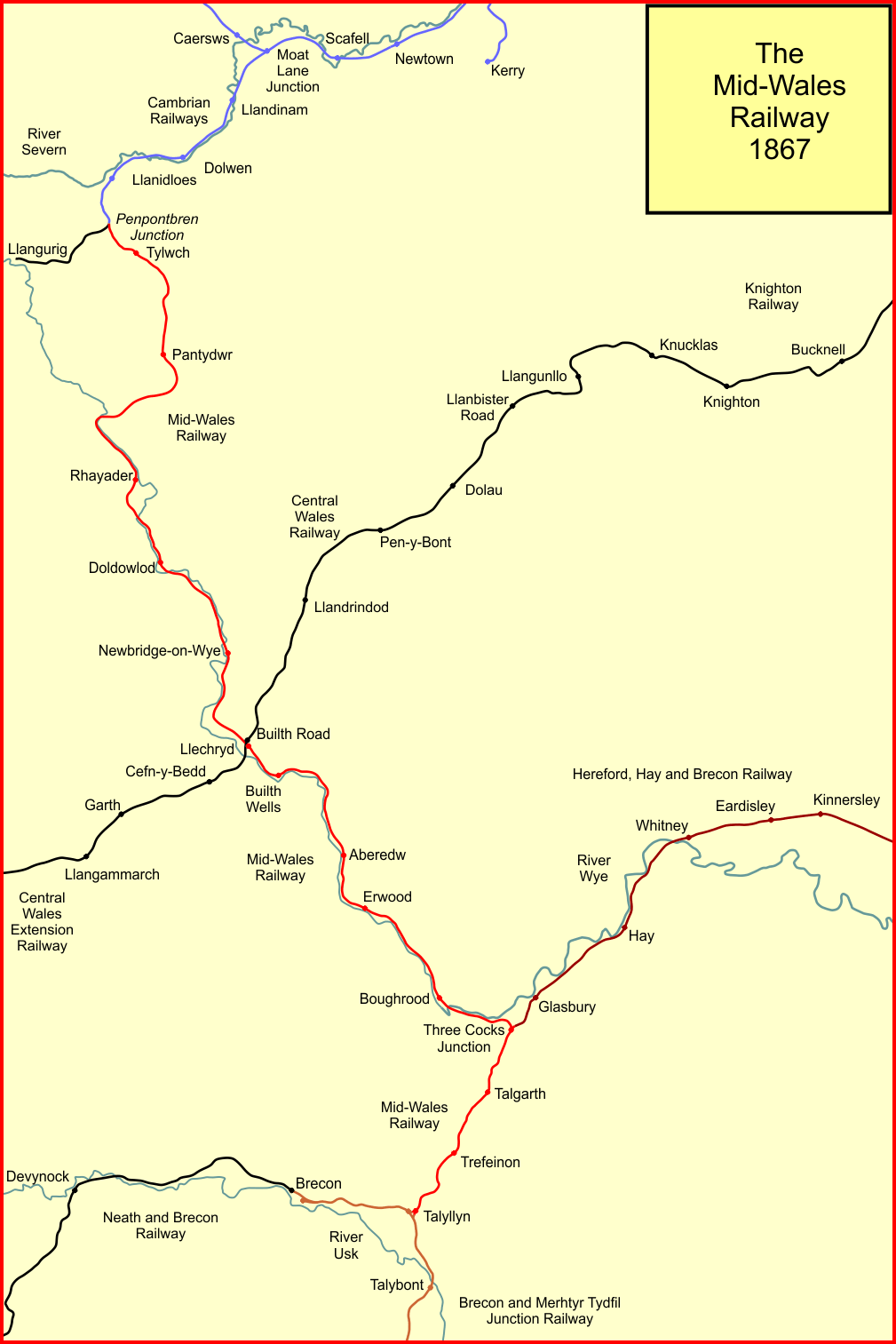
The Mid-Wales Railway system

The Mid-Wales Railway was conceived as a trunk route through Wales connecting industrial areas in North West England with sea ports in South West Wales. The company was prevented from reaching its goal by competing proposals in Parliament, and it was only able to build a line between Llanidloes and a junction with the Brecon and Merthyr Railway 5 miles (8 km) east of Brecon. The line was 70 miles (110 km) long and opened in 1864. The company found it impossible to raise the money by issuing shares, but the contractor partnership of Davies and Savin agreed to build the line and take shares in payment.

The line passed through terrain requiring steep gradients and sharp curves in a sparsely populated area with little local traffic, and the limited long distance business was costly to operate. Finding continued independence impossible to sustain, the company amalgamated with the Cambrian Railways in 1904.

Use of the line declined from the 1930s onwards, and very limited use of the line resulted in closure on 30 December 1962.

== Crossing the centre of Wales ==
As the mainline network of England and Wales began to take shape in the 1840s, the centre of Wales remained without a railway. There were several proposals to cross the region by a trunk railway, in some cases to connect industrial England to coastal ports in West Wales. For some time none of these came into effect, and it was a local line, the Llanidloes and Newtown Railway (L&NR), that first occupied part of the area. It was 17 miles (27 km) long, it opened in 1859, and it was not connected to any other railway. Newtown was a centre of the flannel manufacturing industry.

The Oswestry and Newtown Railway (O&NR) followed in 1861; it connected to the Shrewsbury and Chester Railway at Oswestry, giving access to the national railway network. Next, the Shrewsbury and Welshpool Railway made a connection to the O&NR at Buttington in 1862, forming a route from Newtown to the Midlands and London.

Mid-Wales Railway Act 1859
- Act of Parliament
- Parliament of the United Kingdom
- Long title: An Act for making a Railway from Llanidloes in the County of Montgomery to Newbridge in the County of Radnor, to be called "The Mid-Wales Railway," and for other Purposes.
- Citation: 22 & 23 Vict. c. lxiii

Dates
- Royal assent: 1 August 1859

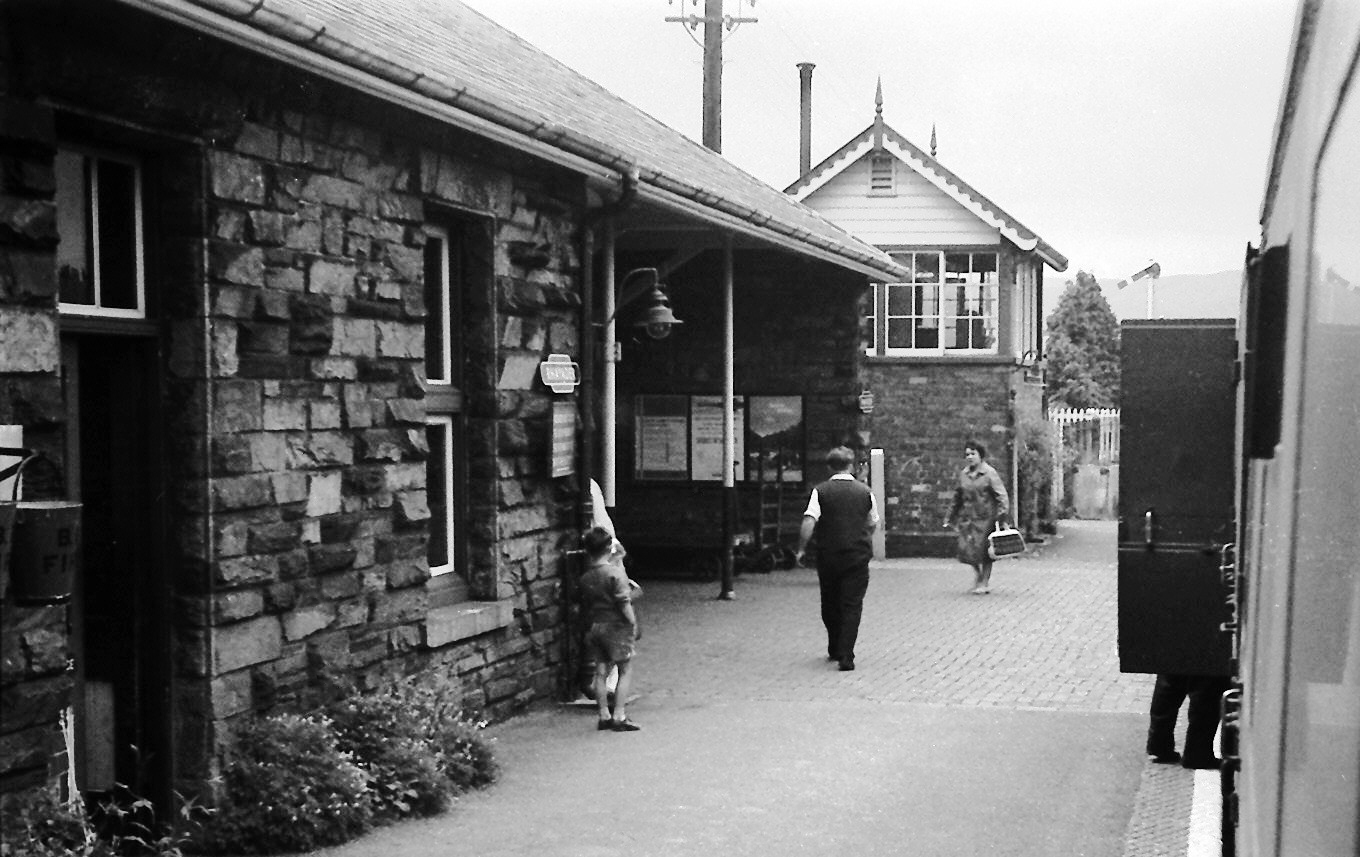
Rhayader railway station in 1962

After a number of false starts, a practicable route across Mid Wales gathered support in March 1859, when a meeting was held to further what became the Mid-Wales Railway. At that time it was described as "the Mid-Wales section of the Manchester, Liverpool, Swansea & Milford Haven Junction Railway". This went to Parliament, competing for approval with other schemes. It was passed, but in a much truncated form, with the title the Mid-Wales Railway, to construct a line from Llanidloes to Newbridge-on-Wye by way of Rhayader. At Llanidloes it would connect with the L&NR, and from there to the national railway network. The Mid-Wales Railway Act 1859 (22 & 23 Vict. c. lxiii) was passed on 1 August 1859; authorised capital was £150,000.

The line's supporters still saw it as part of a trunk express route, and the greatly reduced powers granted by Parliament were, they believed, a temporary setback. Despite the sharp curves and steep gradients, the Shrewsbury Journal repeated the promoters' publicity that "express trains at the highest speeds reached can be run with the greatest ease and perfect security". The directors believed that "as the line would be passing through... one of the richest mineral districts in Britain", they would seek powers to exploit any minerals found during construction. The company's supporters still planned to reach Llandovery as part of the onward thrust towards south-west Wales, but Brecon was also considered to be a useful destination. Other railways were approaching Brecon: also in 1859 the Brecon and Merthyr Tydfil Junction Railway (usually referred to as the Brecon and Merthyr Railway) was authorised, and the Hereford, Hay and Brecon Railway in 1857.

== Extending southwards ==
Mid Wales Railway (Extensions) Act 1860
- Act of Parliament
- Parliament of the United Kingdom
- Long title: An Act to enable the Mid-Wales Railway Company to make a Deviation in their authorized Railway, and to construct Railways to connect their Railway with the Hereford, Hay, and Brecon, and the Brecon and Merthyr Junction Railways; and for other Purposes.
- Citation: 23 & 24 Vict. c. cxxxiii

Dates
- Royal assent: 3 July 1860

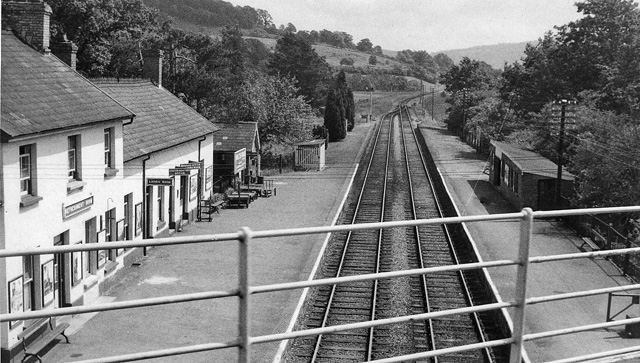
The low-level railway station at Builth Road in 1962

The Mid-Wales Railway (MWR) had no intention of terminating at Newbridge, and the company tried again to get access to Llandovery. In Parliament in the 1860 session it lost out against the Central Wales Extension Railway, and had to make do with powers to join the Hereford, Hay and Brecon Railway at Glasbury, making a junction at a place later known as Three Cocks, and continuing to Talyllyn to join the Brecon and Merthyr Railway there. This had been merely a proposed branch so far as the Mid-Wales was concerned, but having lost Llandovery a second time, the MWR now treated this as its main line. This was authorised by an act of Parliament, the Mid Wales Railway (Extensions) Act 1860 (23 & 24 Vict. c. cxxxiii), on 3 July 1860. The connection to the Brecon and Merthyr Railway would give access not only to Brecon, but also to the mineral areas of Dowlais and Merthyr Tydfil over that line.

Mid-Wales Railway Act 1861
- Act of Parliament
- Parliament of the United Kingdom
- Long title: An Act to enable the Mid-Wales Railway Company to make a Deviation in their authorized Railway; and for other Purposes.
- Citation: 24 & 25 Vict. c. lxv

Dates
- Royal assent: 12 June 1861

The Hereford, Hay and Brecon Railway (HH&BR) would build from Hereford to Glasbury only, with the Mid-Wales Railway to adopt its powers for a line southward from Glasbury as far as Talyllyn. This was to be over the old Hay Tramway, which was to be upgraded and realigned to make it suitable for locomotive operation. However, the Mid-Wales Railway Company's board of directors feared that the HH&BR might demand an unreasonable price to surrender its line, so they arranged for the acquisition to be authorised in Parliament, by the Mid-Wales Railway Act 1861 (24 & 25 Vict. c. lxv) of 12 June 1861. The continuation from Talyllyn into Brecon was also to be mostly over the Hay Tramway route, and the Brecon and Merthyr Railway would adopt the HH&BR powers and construct that part of the route.

== Construction conflict ==
On 23 July 1860, the Manchester and Milford Railway (M&MR) was authorised by the Manchester and Milford Railway Act 1860 (23 & 24 Vict. c. clxxv), also to start from Llanidloes and to run to Pencader.

Although Parliament passed the Manchester and Milford Railway Act 1860 and the Mid Wales Railway (Extensions) Act 1860 a few weeks apart, it was not noticed that for the first 1 1/2 miles (2.4 km) from Llanidloes, the two railways would occupy the same ground. This fact emerged as construction was being planned, and each company wanted to build the duplicated section, and permit the other to use the line for a fee. Both companies refused the other's idea, and finally a compromise was agreed: the Llanidloes and Newtown Railway (L&NR) would build the duplicated part of the lines and allow the two companies to use it. The point of divergence of the two southward routes was Penpontbren, about two miles (3 km) from Llanidloes. The M&MR built part of its line from Penpontbren to Llangurig, a distance of about two miles (3 km), and a single goods train traversed the stub of line, after which it became dormant. By this time the M&MR was having serious doubts about the wisdom of continuing construction over the difficult terrain to reach Llangurig from the south, and made the huge decision to divert the line to Aberystwyth instead. The Llangurig stub remained, disused, and the M&MR paid the L&NR interest charges and operating and maintenance costs on the enlarged Llanidloes station, which it would now never use. The effect of all this was that the MWR joined the L&NR end-on at Penpontbren, and not at Llanidloes, but had shared ownership (with the L&NR and the M&MR) of the Llanidloes station.

== Construction ==
The company had found raising the subscriptions for construction almost impossible, and the contractors David Davies and Thomas Savin, enjoying considerable success in railway building in Wales, had agreed to construct the line, taking shares as most of their payment. This saved the company, which would otherwise almost certainly have failed. On 2 September 1859 the first sod of the northern part of the Mid-Wales Railway was cut at Rhayader. There was the customary banquet afterwards, and some directors made adverse remarks about Davies and Savin's financial involvement, which was felt to compromise the board's authority. The truth was that without that money, there would have been no railway, but unnecessary friction was generated by intemperate remarks.

In fact Davies and Savin themselves fell out shortly afterwards, and parted company with each other and with the company before any construction was actually started. A fresh contractor, Alexander Thomas Gordon, took on the work. Little work was done by Gordon due to continuing money shortage, and he was followed by James Overend and John Watson on 26 March 1862. Like Davies and Savin, they were to be paid in shares: 223,000 ordinary shares, 117,000 debentures and 200,000 Lloyds bonds.

At Talyllyn Junction, with the Brecon and Merthyr Railway, a triangular layout was adopted, and the Mid-Wales Railway built a station at the North Junction, with platforms for trains to Brecon and also to Dowlais, the latter being on the East Loop. The Brecon and Merthyr Railway built a station by the West Junction. As a result Talyllyn had two stations to serve a tiny population: in 1900 Brynderwen had nine houses and Talyllyn eleven.

A length of line extending 29 chains (580 m) east from Three Cocks Junction towards Hereford was declared to be Mid-Wales property: the intention had been to make a triangular junction here, as at Talyllyn; there would have been an East Junction where the line entered the cutting to go under the Glasbury road. This was not proceeded with, but the Mid-Wales company owned what would have been the south-to-east arm of the triangle.

The Mid-Wales Railway operated a special demonstration train throughout the line on 23 August 1864. Remedial work was necessitated by the Board of Trade inspecting officer's refusal to sanction opening for passenger traffic earlier. Full goods services (apart from the east loop at Talyllyn) operated from 1 September 1864. The Hereford, Hay and Brecon Railway service from Hereford to Brecon was running by 19 September, traversing the MWR from Three Cocks Junction to Talyllyn. Ordinary Mid-Wales passenger trains probably started on 21 September, although special trains were run on 19 and 20 September for Brecon Races, with borrowed engines.

== Cambrian Railways formed ==
Before long, the several networks centred on Newtown decided that they needed to join up with one another, and in July 1864 the Cambrian Railways company was formed by the amalgamation of four existing companies: the Llanidloes and Newtown Railway, the Oswestry and Newtown Railway, the Newtown and Machynlleth Railway, and the Oswestry, Ellesmere and Whitchurch Railway (the Aberystwith and Welsh Coast Railway would join soon after). The Mid-Wales Railway did not participate in this amalgamation, but the Cambrian Railways Act 1864 (27 & 28 Vict. c. cclxii) preserved the MWR rights concerning running powers over parts of the other lines.

== Builth Wells connection ==
Mid Wales Railway Act 1864
- Act of Parliament
- Parliament of the United Kingdom
- Long title: An Act to enable the Mid Wales Railway Company to make a Railway to join the Central Wales Extension Rail way in the Parish of Llanelwedd in the County of Radnor; and to confer upon the said Company further Powers with respect to Roads crossed by their Railway, and with respect to the Purchase of Lands; and to enable the said Company to let their Railway on Lease; and to raise further Sums; and for other Purposes.
- Citation: 27 & 28 Vict. c. cxlii

Dates
- Royal assent: 30 June 1864

Text of statute as originally enacted

The directors of the Mid-Wales Railway still hoped to get part of the traffic they had anticipated if they had reached Llandovery, as they had originally proposed. A spur connection at Llechryd to the proposed Central Wales Extension Railway (CWER) would at least give the possibility of reaching Llandovery, and from there onwards to south-west Wales. A connection was agreed near Builth where the lines intersected, and the MWR got powers on 30 June 1864 in the Mid Wales Railway Act 1864 (27 & 28 Vict. c. cxlii). It opened a station called Llechryd (for Central Wales) near the intersection in April 1866, and the spur was brought into use on 1 November 1866, when the Central Wales Extension Railway opened from Llandrindod to Builth Road. The rest of the CWER to Llandovery was not opened until 1 June 1868. The spur was transferred to the London and North Western Railway when it took over the CWER on 4 July 1870.

== Merthyr ==
In 1864 the Mid-Wales Railway was receiving mineral traffic from Dowlais over the Brecon and Merthyr Railway, but the connection to Merthyr, which would be more productive of through traffic, was not open until 1 August 1868. It provided a direct outlet to Cardiff and the Rhondda and Taff valleys, and from the opening day coal trains ran through from South Wales to Birkenhead. There was massive demand for coal at Birkenhead for bunkering steamships, and South Wales steam coal was particularly desirable for the purpose.

== Commercial results ==
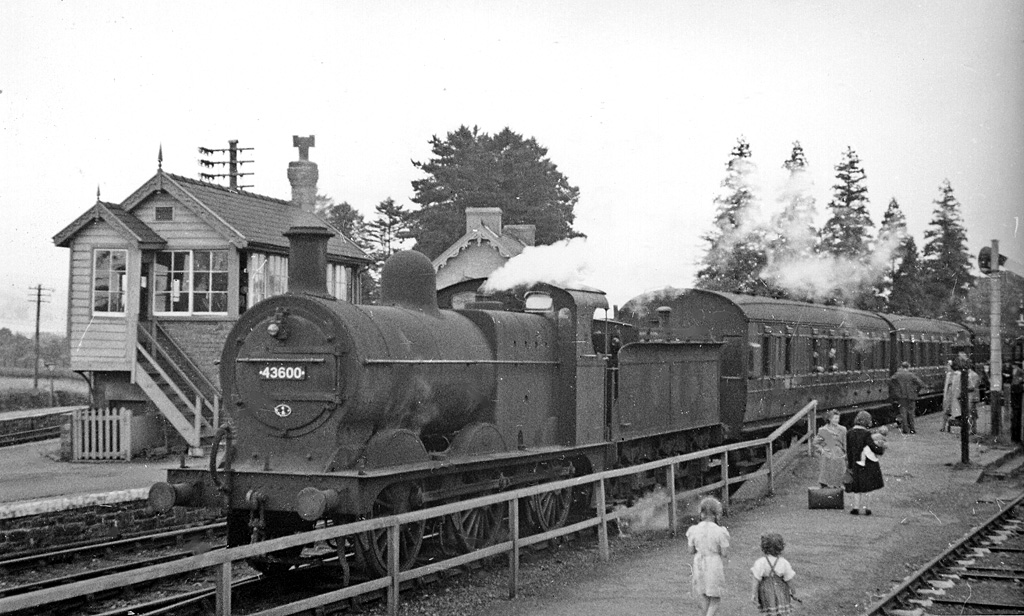
A train at Three Cocks Junction railway station in 1949

The population of mid-Wales was tiny: there were probably under 20,000 people living in the area served by the entire line; the largest town served by the Mid-Wales Railway (MWR) trains was Brecon with a population of 5,000. Llanidloes was an important centre, but its commerce was orientated more towards Newtown and Shrewsbury. Builth had a population of 1,200 when the line was opened; Rhayader had 1,000. In consequence local business on the line was always light. Emphasis was laid more on passenger than goods services as there were few freight originating points. Goods carried in the last half of 1865 amounted to some 12,000 tons which yielded about a quarter of the gross receipts. Figures for the first half of 1865 showed that working expenses of £6,550 represented nearly 58 per cent of the receipts of £11,312. The national average at the time was 46%. The number of trains run for each mile of route was 3,425 compared with the national average of 10,095.

Through goods services should have been lucrative, but the company found that the big companies, the Great Western Railway (GWR) and the London and North Western Railway (LNWR) in particular, which had their own established trunk routes in Wales, were not prepared to quote through goods rates in competition with their own business. Half of the 36,000 tons of mineral traffic that the company carried in that period was iron ore from Northamptonshire to South Wales, routed forward over the Brecon and Merthyr Railway (B&MR), and the MWR share of the transit was only between Three Cocks and Talyllyn. Moreover, the MWR found it difficult to match the GWR's quoted rates for carrying coal from South Wales to Birkenhead; the only traffic which did grow was inwards carriage of lime: in 1865, 8,000 tons were carried.

A crisis came when Watson and Overend gave up their lease and stopped working the line as a result of the failure of Savin, who had backed Watson financially. At short notice the Mid-Wales Railway Company had to find an alternative way to work the line. In late February 1865 the directors tried to interest other companies in working it, including the Midland Railway and the Manchester, Sheffield and Lincolnshire Railway, both of which were known to be interested in expanding their activities into Wales; however both declined.

Under an 1871 agreement the Mid-Wales Railway paid the B&MR £400 per annum plus £400 for working expenses for both the Brecon and Talyllyn stations. The B&MR built a new station at Talyllyn; it opened on 1 October 1869. While it was being built the B&MR's old station, called Brynderwen, could not be used, so trains from Brecon to Dowlais set back from the east junction to the platform of the Mid-Wales station on the east loop.

In 1879 the MWR's debenture holders went to court in the Chancery Division, and a receiver was appointed. The company had issued £275,706 in debentures and was unable to meet the interest. Nevertheless after lengthy hearings, the action was dismissed and the receiver was discharged. The company was allowed to raise a further £40,000 in debentures, and a scheme of arrangement was drawn up under which holders of 'A' stock would receive 4 per cent from 1 July 1879 and of 'B' stock 3.5 per cent. Most of the new capital would of course be consumed in paying back interest to existing debenture holders; it was a delaying operation, and it did not resolve anything.

== Worked by the Cambrian Railways, and amalgamation ==
Cambrian Railways (Mid Wales Railway Amalgamation, &c.) Act 1904
- Act of Parliament
- Parliament of the United Kingdom
- Long title: An Act for amalgamating the Mid Wales Railway Company with the Cambrian Railways Company for conferring further powers upon the last-named Company and for other purposes.
- Citation: 4 Edw. 7. c. xxvi

Dates
- Royal assent: 24 June 1904

Text of statute as originally enacted

In 1887 an agreement was concluded whereby the Cambrian Railways took over the working of the Mid-Wales Railway; it was to be effective from 1 January 1888. The working agreement proved a success and encouraged thought of amalgamation. Early in 1903 the decision was taken to do so, although it was not until 28 October 1903 that measures to present an authorising bill was finally taken. This was passed as the Cambrian Railways (Mid Wales Railway Amalgamation, &c.) Act 1904 (4 Edw. 7. c. xxvi) of 24 June 1904, and was effective from 1 July.

== Train services ==
During its independent days the Mid-Wales Railway did not alter its basic passenger train service from three trains per day each way down the whole line. There were in addition short workings from Builth Wells, and sometimes other stations south, to Llechryd to make connection with the Central Wales line trains. The early timetables of the Mid-Wales Railway showed Dowlais (and Merthyr when opened) as if they were its own stations; in fact all stations from Talyllyn to Dowlais Top and Merthyr were listed.

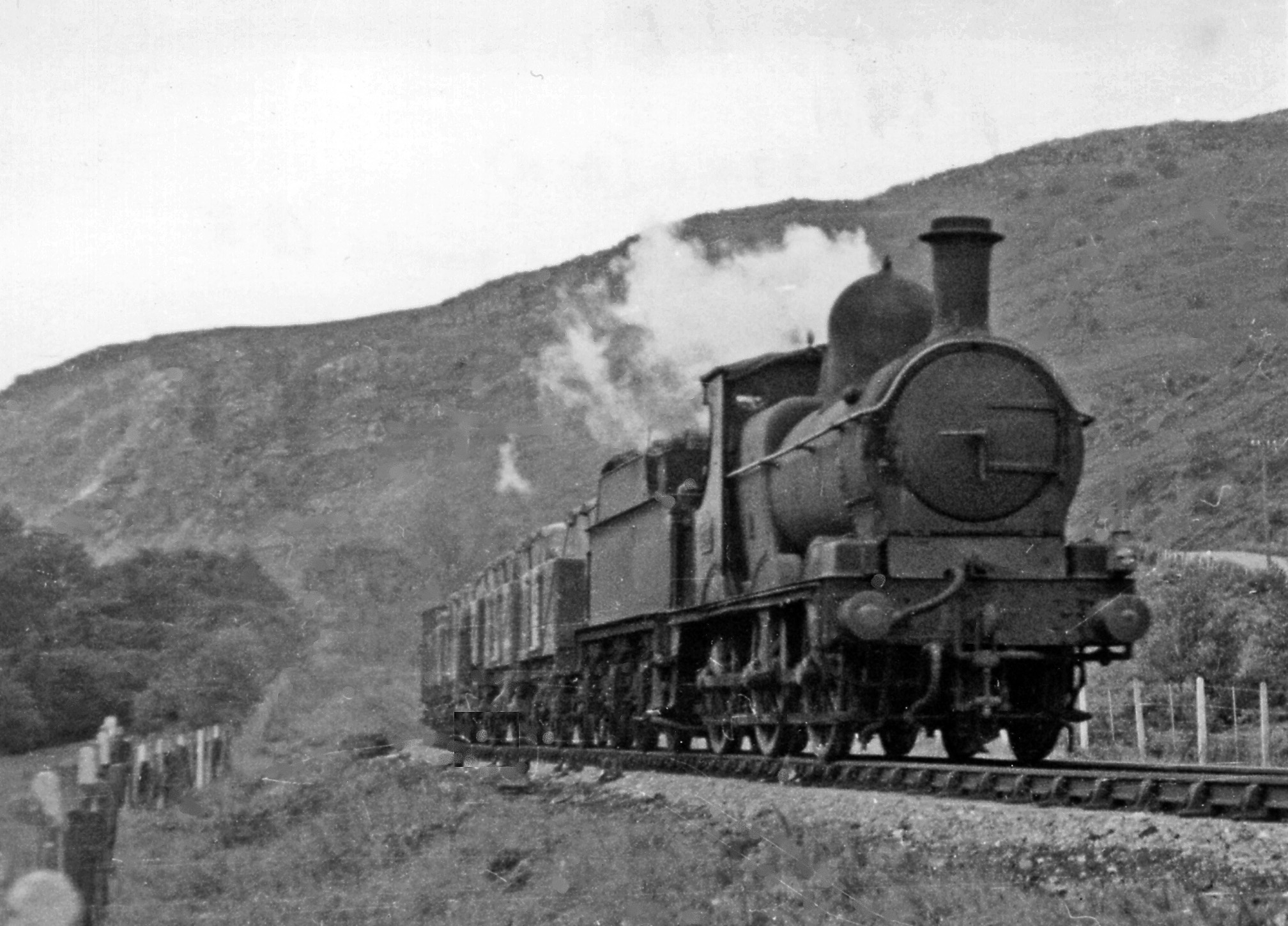
A goods train near Doldowlod in 1949

All regular passenger train crossings on the single line were at Builth Wells or Three Cocks. In 1874 a service was begun of three trains a week from Llanidloes to Neath; a Mid-Wales engine worked through to Neath. From 1880 in summertime through carriages were run from Cardiff over the Rhymney Railway via Bargoed and on over the B&MR to Talyllyn Junction, then over the Mid-Wales and Cambrian Railways to Aberystwyth. Mid-Wales carriages were also kept at Cardiff Queen Street and Newport High Street stations. Much of this traffic went through to Cambrian Railway resorts, but some was for Llandrindod Wells, and this was handled by arranging connecting trains at Llechryd, with the Central Wales line of the LNWR.

At about this time the connection at Builth Road with the Central Wales line was altered to take passenger traffic, but it seems that passenger trains did not operate for some time. From the tourism point of view, its only value would have been to put Builth Wells on a direct service with the other "Wells" towns, Llandrindod, Llanwrtyd and Llangamarch, but this would have required a double reverse at Builth Road. In fact shuttle trains operated and passengers changed at the junction.

== Elan valley reservoir railway ==
In the early 1890s Birmingham Corporation determined that the Elan Valley could be dammed to make a reservoir to supply some of Birmingham's needs. In 1892 the idea became a definite plan, and when implemented it was one of the greatest projects of municipal dam building. The nearest station was Rhayader and the area was remote, and would need a railway connection to reach all the dam sites. By October 1893 a junction had been made just south of the tunnel near Rhayader; the Cambrian erected a 40-lever signal box by the junction, controlling access to a loop. The Birmingham Water Works Committee worked the line itself after the initial setting-up period. The signal box and junction loop were opened in June 1894; the exchange sidings were not completed until August 1895, although a press and VIP visit had been run on 10 July 1894.

Some of the construction workers lived in Llanidloes, and for them a workmen's train was put on by the Cambrian early on Monday mornings, running non-stop to Rhayader; also a similar return train ran on Saturday afternoons.

== From 1922 ==
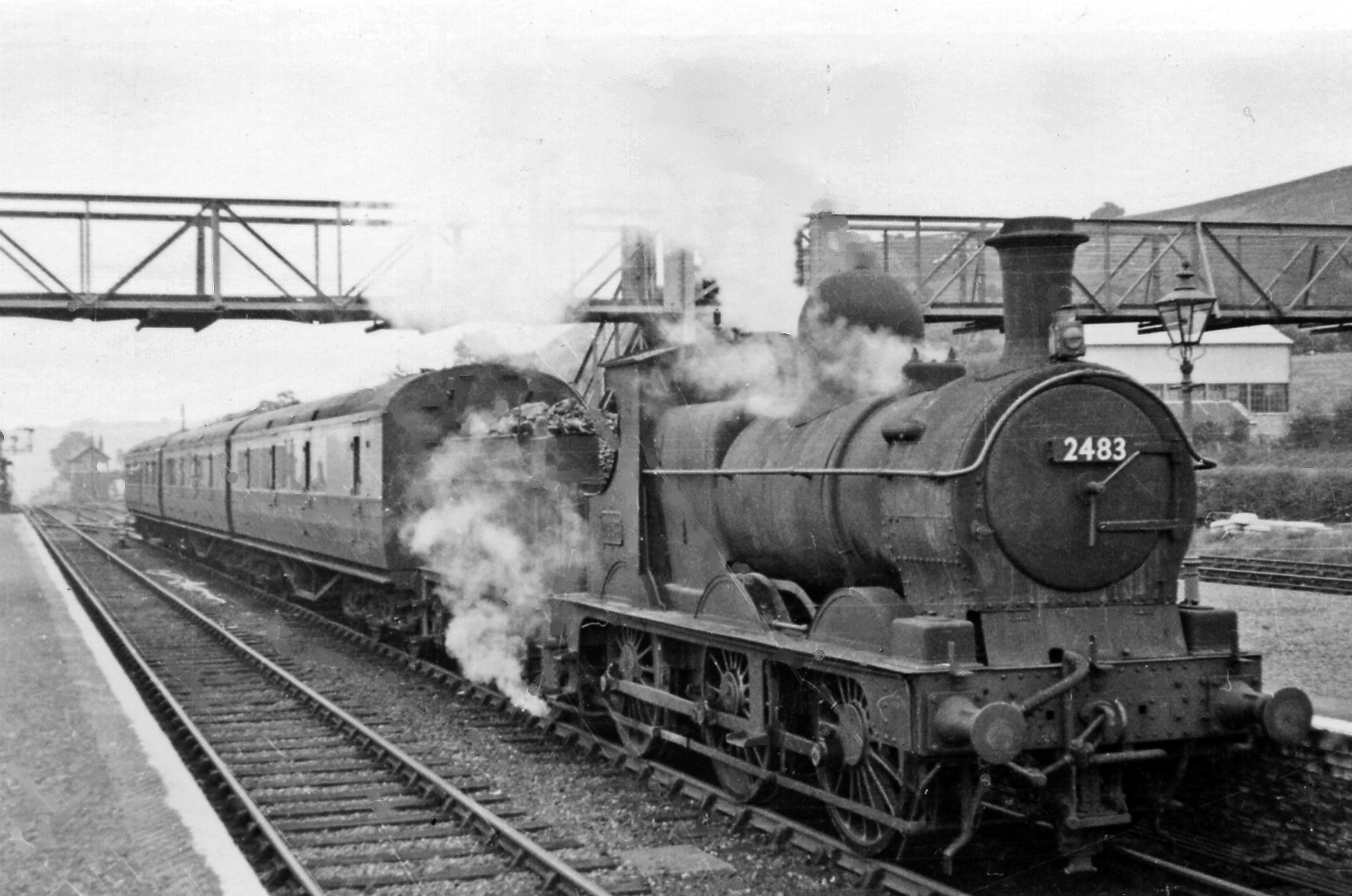
A train at Llanidloes railway station in 1949

The government decided to merge most of the numerous independent railways of Great Britain into one or other of four new large companies, in a process called the "grouping of the railways" under the Railways Act 1921. The Cambrian Railways, of which the Mid-Wales Railway network was now a part, was to be a constituent of the new Great Western Railway group. Summary statistics prepared for the process showed that the Cambrian Railway group were not paying a dividend in 1921. Semmens claims that the Cambrian Railways finished the year with a good balance on its books, which showed a profit of £122,970. (Note: Semmens refers to this as "net income"; Christiansen and Miller quote the same figure but call it "profit". In either case it probably means "operating profit" and almost certainly excludes tax and interest charges.) Christiansen and Miller say "the increases in trade and fares were not sufficient to keep the small companies buoyant and everything was against them remaining independent any longer. Costs and wages had soared to such a level that it was impossible for a company the size of the Cambrian, which had limited potential, to meet expenses out of revenue."

The new Great Western Railway was formed from its seven constituents from 1 January 1922. Due to the amalgamation tribunal not giving its assent until March, the actual date of amalgamation was 25 March 1922.

During the 1930s the GWR made great efforts to stimulate traffic on the Mid-Wales line by excursions and cheap tickets. Such events as the Brecon Agricultural Show, the Radnorshire Show, or the Shrewsbury Floral Fete were the occasion for cheap fares or special trains, though timetabled trains were more often used. There were some remarkable long distance excursions, such as Builth Wells to Liverpool, good value at 6 shillings. Another 6-shilling trip was an excursion from Llanidloes to Barry Island on a Sunday.

Goods traffic on the line had always been varied. Although timber had been handled at two of the private sidings and stone at the Llanelwedd siding, there were no important industries along the route itself; it was through traffic, apart from some local sheep transfers. Kidner quotes a foreman on the line from 1920 to 1964: there was slate from the Cambrian's northern lines going to South Wales; dolomite from the Llynclys quarry to Ebbw Vale and Dowlais, one train per day for many years. Some structural steel, fabricated or semi-fabricated, came off the Cheshire Lines railway and down through the Mid-Wales for export at Cardiff.

== Closure ==
Details emerged in early Spring of 1962 of proposals to be put to the Transport Users' Consultative Committee to close all the three lines into Brecon. The last train on the Mid-Wales Railway ran on 30 December 1962. Rhayader yard was left open for coal concentration (not rail connected) until 5 April 1965, as were the depots at Builth Wells and Talgarth. Builth Road low level yard continued to be served by the curve from the Central Wales until 6 September 1965.

== Topography ==
=== Gradients ===
The Mid-Wales Railway ran through hilly country. From a zero mileage at Llanidloes in the Severn Valley it climbed almost continuously at typically 1 in 77 for 7 miles (11 km) to a summit near Pantydŵr, at 947 feet (289 m) above sea level. The line then descended into the Wye Valley at similar gradients, with only a short respite at St Harmons and a short climb at Rhayader. This descent continued to milepost 18 (29 km) beyond Doldowlod, after which the line undulated, ending in another steep descent to Builth, 27 miles (43 km). A three-mile (5 km) climb to a further summit at Tir Celyn was next, then falling for 6 miles (10 km) to Boughrood, in the Usk Valley. From Three Cocks there was another steep climb of 7 miles (11 km) to Talyllyn. There were two short tunnels.

=== Locations ===
- Llanidloes; opened 2 September 1859; relocated by January 1862; closed 31 December 1962; station joint between Llanidloes and Newtown Railway, Mid-Wales Railway, and Manchester and Milford Railway; line to Penpontbren Junction owned by the L&NR;
- Penpontbren Junction; divergence of Manchester and Milford Railway branch; start of Mid-Wales Railway;
- Tylwch; opened 21 September 1864; closed 31 December 1962;
- Glan-yr-Afon Halt; opened 16 January 1928; closed 31 December 1962;
- Pantydwr; opened 21 September 1864; closed 31 December 1962;
- St Harmons; opened June 1872; closed 31 December 1962;
- Marteg Tunnel; 372 yards (340 m);
- Marteg Halt; opened 18 May 1931; closed 31 December 1962;
- Rhayader Tunnel; 270 yards (250 m);
- Rhayader; opened 21 September 1864; closed 31 December 1962;
- Elan Valley Junction; for Elan Valley Reservoir construction;
- Doldowlod; opened 21 September 1864; closed 31 December 1962;
- Newbridge-on-Wye; opened 21 September 1864; closed 31 December 1962;
- Builth Road Low Level Junction; divergence of connecting spur to Central Wales Extension line;
- Builth Road Junction; opened 1 November 1866; variously known as Central Wales Junction; then Llechryd; then Builth Road from 1 May 1889; renamed Builth Road Low Level 1950; closed 31 December 1962;
- Builth; opened 21 September 1864; renamed Builth Wells 1865; closed 31 December 1962;
- Llanfaredd Halt; opened 7 May 1934; closed 31 December 1962;
- Aberedw; opened November 1867; closed 31 December 1962;
- Tir Celyn Platform; unadvertised private station to serve one local house; opened in 1872; closed in 1950;
- Erwood; opened 21 September 1864; closed 31 December 1962;
- Llanstephan Halt; opened 6 March 1933; closed 31 December 1962;
- Boughrood; opened 21 September 1864; renamed Boughrood and Llyswen 1 October 1912; closed 31 December 1962;
- Three Cocks Junction; opened 19 September 1864; closed 31 December 1962; convergence of Hereford, Hay and Brecon Railway;
- Talgarth; opened 19 September 1864; closed 31 December 1962;
- Trefeinon; opened October 1864; closed 31 December 1962;
- Llangorse Lake Halt; opened 9 July 1923; closed 31 December 1962;
- Talyllyn North Junction;
- end of MWR and start of Brecon and Merthyr Railway;
- Talyllyn West Junction;
- Talyllyn Junction; opened 21 September 1864; closed 31 December 1962; line on to Brecon.
