= Builth Wells railway station =

Rail station in Wales

Builth Wells
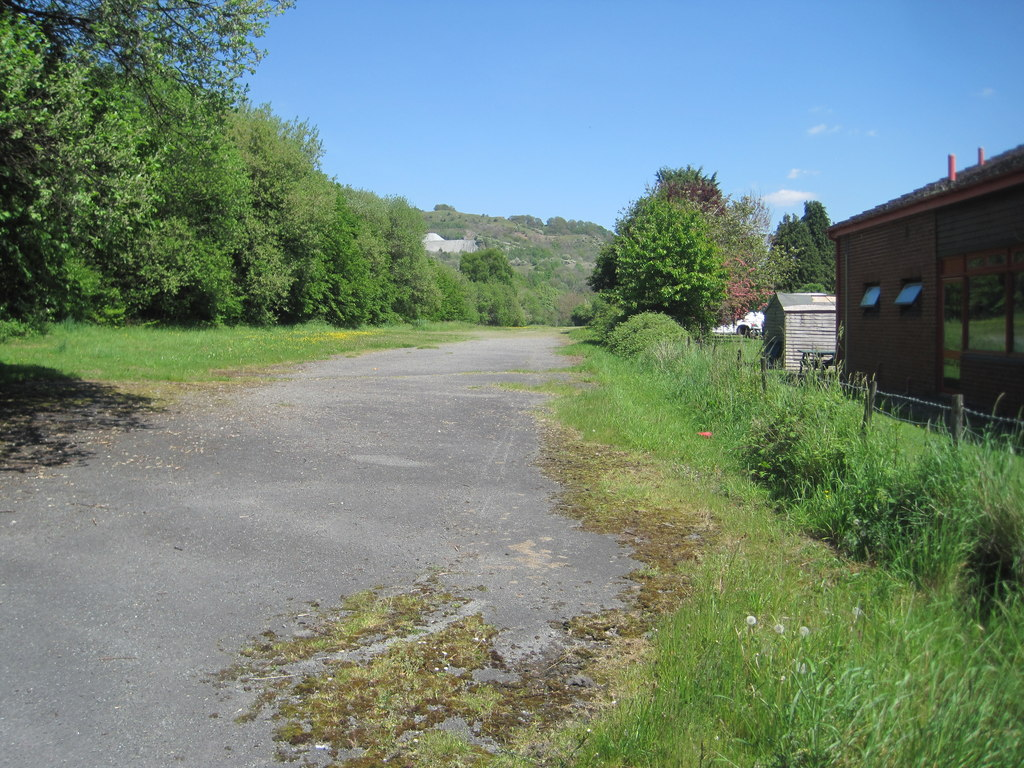
- The site of the station in 2014

General information
- Location: Llanelwedd, Powys; Wales
- Coordinates: 52.1535°N 3.4016°W
- Grid reference: SO229428
- Platforms: 2

Other information
- Status: Disused

History
- Original company: Mid-Wales Railway
- Pre-grouping: Cambrian Railways
- Post-grouping: Great Western Railway

Key dates
- 1864: opened
- 1962: Closed
Location

Builth Wells railway station, in Llanelwedd Powys Wales was opened as Builth station on 21 September 1864 by the Mid-Wales Railway, although excursions ran on 19 and 20 September. It was renamed Builth Wells station in 1865 and served the town of Builth Wells. The station closed in 1962.

It should not be confused with Builth Road railway station (around two miles (3.5 km) northwest of Builth Wells) which still has train services.

Preceding station	Disused railways	Following station
Builth Road; Low Level Station; Line and station closed	Cambrian Railways; Mid-Wales Railway	Llanfaredd Halt; Line and station closed
