= Rhayader =

Town in Wales

Rhayader: Welsh: Rhaeadr Gwy
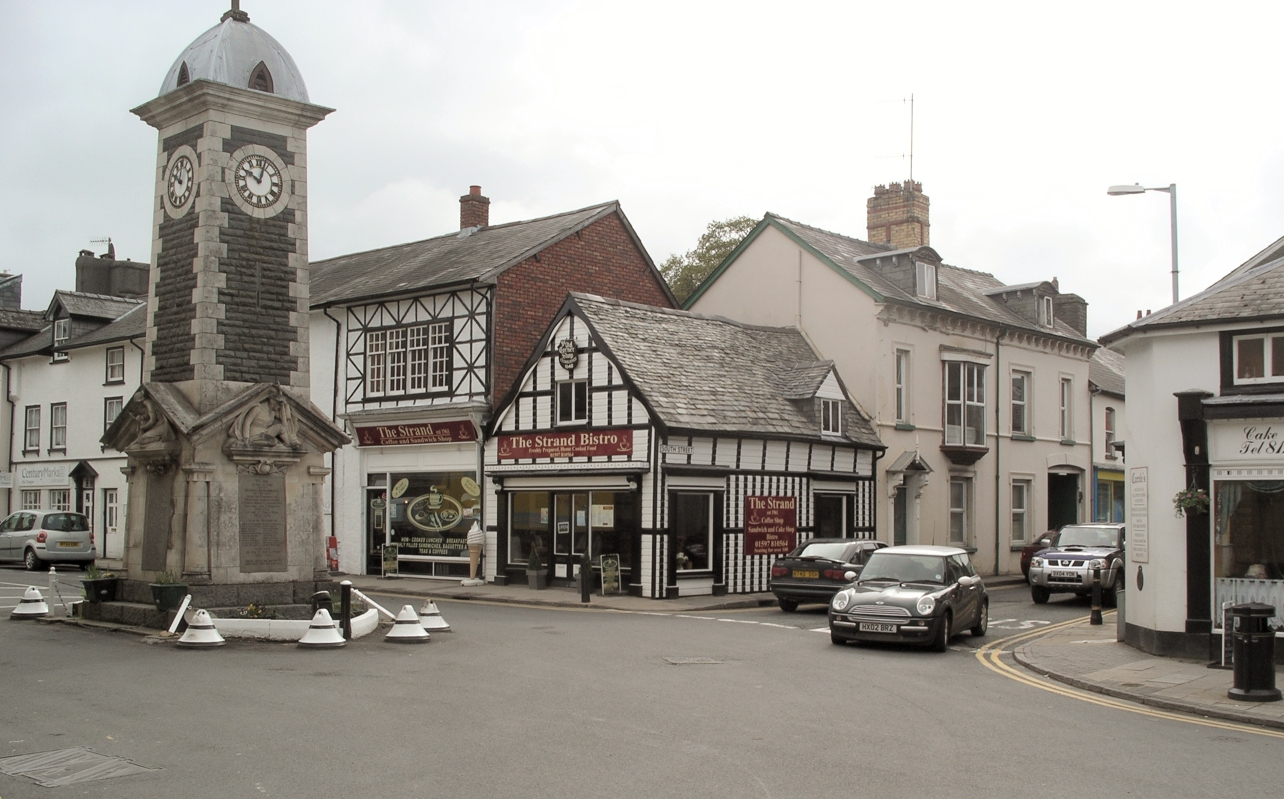

- Location within Powys
- Area: 137.31 km^{2} (53.02 sq mi)
- Population: 2,088
  - Density: 15/km^{2} (39/sq mi)
- OS grid reference: SN975685
- Principal area: Powys
- Preserved county: Powys
- Country: Wales
- Sovereign state: United Kingdom
- Post town: RHAYADER
- Postcode district: LD6
- Dialling code: 01597
- Police: Dyfed-Powys
- Fire: Mid and West Wales
- Ambulance: Welsh
- UK Parliament: Brecon & Radnorshire
- Senedd Cymru – Welsh Parliament: Brecon and Radnorshire
- List of places UK Wales Powys 52.301°N 3.511°W Community map: Map of the community

Rhayader (/ˈreɪ.ədər/; Welsh: Rhaeadr Gwy; pronounced [ˈr̥əɪadar ˈɡʊi̯]) is a market town and community in Powys, Wales, within the historic county of Radnorshire. The town is 20 miles (32 km) from the source of the River Wye on Plynlimon, the highest point of the Cambrian Mountains, and is located at the junction of the A470 road and the A44 road 13 miles (21 km) north of Builth Wells and 30 miles (48 km) east of Aberystwyth.

The 2011 census recorded the population at 2,088, with 55% of the community having some form of Welsh identity. The community is the largest in Wales by area, with 137.31 km^{2} (53.02 sq mi). It includes the Elan Valley.

Rhayader holds the record for the lowest-ever temperature recorded in Wales, -23.3 °C on 21 January 1940.

== Etymology ==
The name, Rhayader, is a partly-Anglicised form of its Welsh name, Y Rhaeadr ('the waterfall'), or, to distinguish it from other places named after waterfalls, Rhaeadr Gwy ('waterfall [on the] Wye'). Strictly speaking, according to place-name spelling conventions in Welsh, the name of the town would be Rhaeadr-gwy, and the waterfall itself Rhaeadr Gwy, but it seems that this distinction is usually ignored.

In the Welsh of the area the name is Rheiad, as one would expect on the pattern of similar words in colloquial Welsh, pronounced [ˈr̥əɪad]. That is, a final "r" is dropped after "d", as in aradr ('plough') > arad, Llangynidr ('church of Cynidr', a village in Breconshire) > Llangynid, Cadwaladr (a forename, 'battle-leader') > Cadwalad, 'Dwalad.

Little remains of the waterfall itself, it having been destroyed in 1780 to make way for the bridge linking the town to Cwmdauddwr and the Elan Valley, the Lakeland of Wales.

== History ==
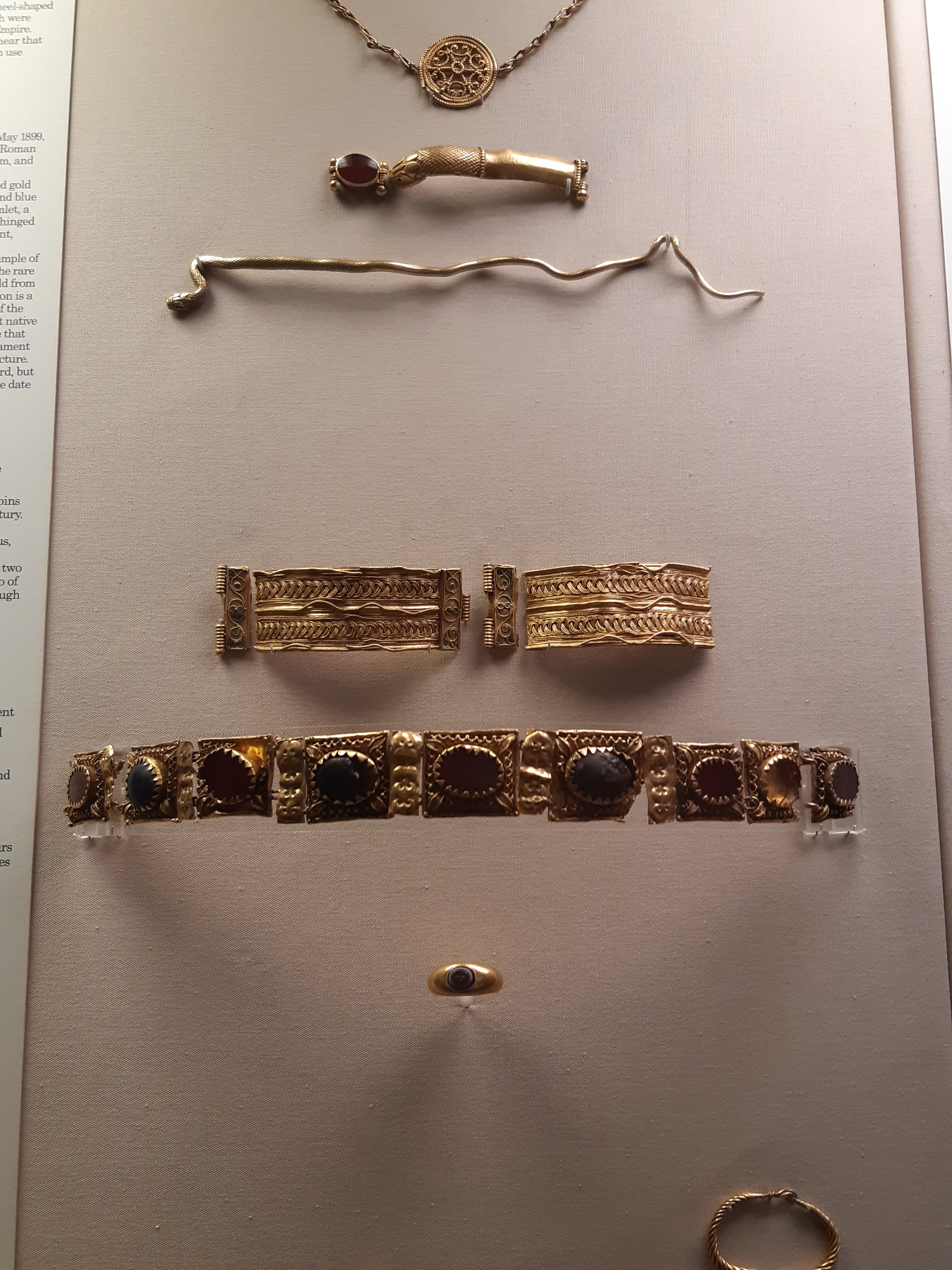
The Rhayader Hoard of Romano-British jewellery in the British Museum

Rhayader has long been a natural stopping point for travellers – the Romans had a stop-over camp in the Elan Valley, monks travelled between the abbeys of Strata Florida and Abbeycwmhir and drovers headed to the lucrative markets with their livestock. It was not until the 12th century that a documented history of the town began with the building of Rhayader Castle in 1177. Little remains today, with the exception of a dry moat that can be seen from Wauncapel Park.

One of the oldest buildings in Rhayader is the Old Swan, which stands on the corner of West and South Streets Rhayader. The original building was mentioned in 1676 as being one of the two inns in Rhayader at that date. Some changes were made in 1683, including the rebuilding of the three chimney stacks, and this date is carved into the old timbers inside the building.

In the 19th century, turnpike roads were only passable on payment of extortionate tolls, imposing additional burdens on already poor communities. This led to the Rebecca Riots across South and Mid Wales from 1839 to 1842, with no fewer than six of Rhayader's tollgates being demolished with impunity by local farmers dressed as women. The actions of these "Rebeccaites" led to a Commission of Inquiry being set up, and most of Rebecca's grievances were righted two years later.

In the 1890s the rapidly expanding city of Birmingham, 80 miles (130 kilometres) east, viewed the nearby Elan Valley as the ideal source of clean, safe water. This was to change the face of Rhayader forever, bringing thousands of workers involved in building this massive complex of dams and reservoirs to the area. A new railway was built connecting this huge area with the main network in Rhayader, and the construction of a new village to house the workers was built on the banks of the River Elan. Work started in 1894 and the scheme was officially opened in 1904 by King Edward VII and Queen Alexandra.

The area around the town has several cairns and standing stones dating from several thousand years BCE. An important hoard of gold jewellery dating from the 1st–2nd centuries AD was found nearby in 1899. Known as the Rhayader Hoard, it is now in the Romano-British collection of the British Museum.

== Governance ==
Rhayader is an electoral ward to Powys County Council, electing one county councillor. As of 2022, the incumbent is Cllr Angela Davies of the Liberal Democrats.

Rhayader Town Council represents the town at the local level, with 14 town councillors elected from the Rhayader and Cwmdauddwr community wards.

== Notable people ==
- Jonathan Williams (ca.1752 – 1829), clergyman, schoolmaster and antiquarian writer.
- Thomas Jones (1819–1882), Independent minister, known as the Welsh Poet-Preacher
- John Evans (1867–1958), emigrated to Canada in 1890 and became a farmer and politician
- Mary Jones (1896–1990), film actress.
- Robert Jermain Thomas (1840 – disappeared 1866), Protestant missionary who served with the London Missionary Society in China and Korea

== Transport ==
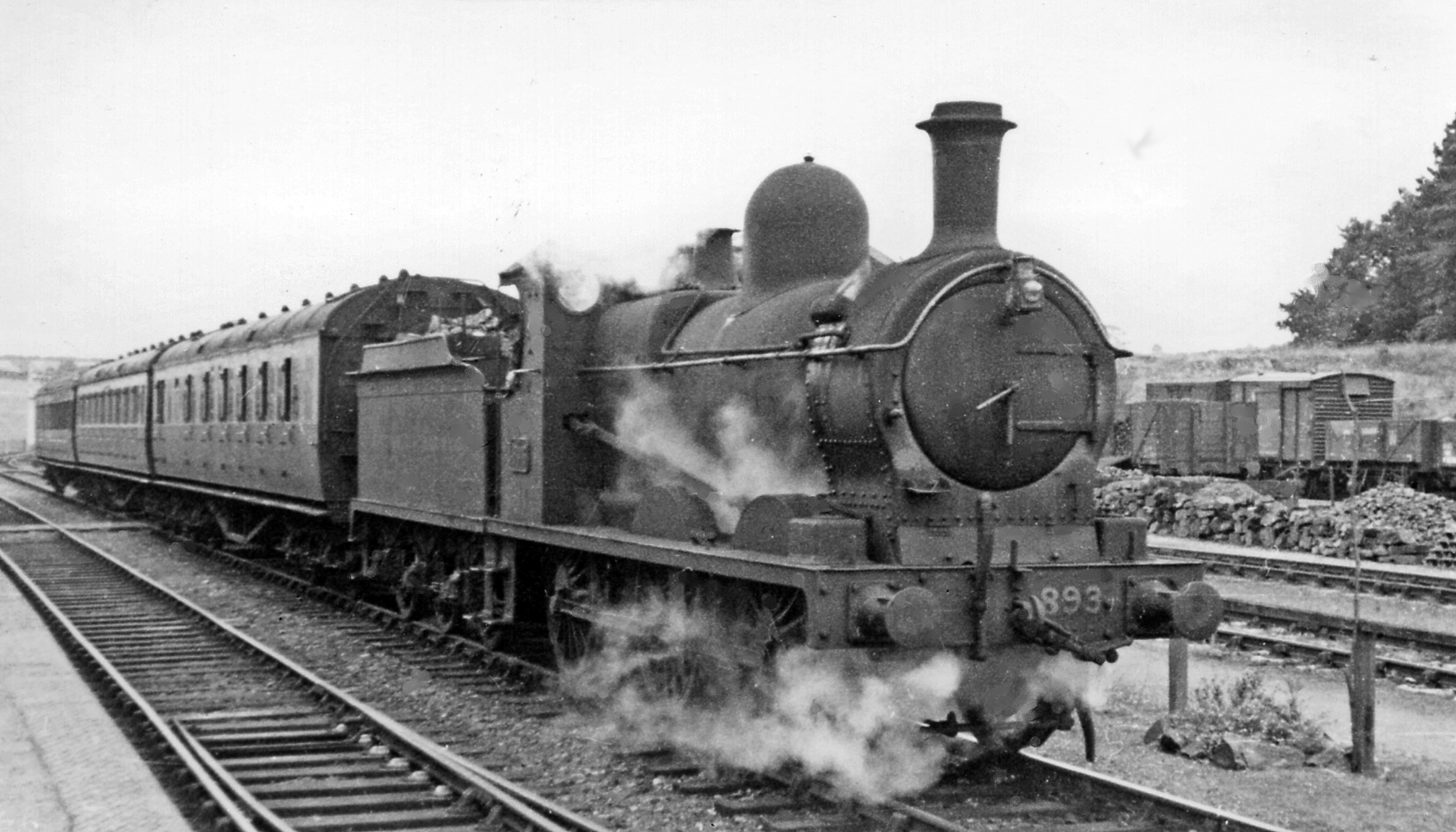
Rhayader station with a local Mid-Wales Railway train, 1949

The station on the Mid-Wales Railway line that served the town was closed on 31 December 1962. The nearest station is now 9 miles (14 kilometres) away, at Pen-y-Bont railway station, Crossgates on the Heart of Wales line, though connections are usually made at the more accessible Llandrindod railway station, a similar distance away.

A bus service connects with outlying villages and neighbouring towns, with two-hourly daytime departures to Builth Wells, Llandrindod Wells, Aberystwyth and Newtown, with connections to Hereford, Shrewsbury and Cardiff.

Due to the volume of traffic generated by the convergence of two trunk roads — the A44 and the A470 — the construction of a bypass to relieve congestion at the town centre crossroads has been an ongoing debate for many years.

The town is also a popular cycling centre and is on Route 8 of the United Kingdom National Cycle Network, known in Welsh as Lôn Las Cymru, 'Wales' green lane'.

== Amenities ==
Tourism and agriculture are the most important industries locally. Walkers and cyclists are drawn to Rhayader for the abundance of trails and bridleways surrounding the town, which is the gateway to a massive complex of reservoirs and dams (The Elan Valley). This vast area is home to some of Britain's rarest wildlife and plants, including red kites, along with magnificent feats of engineering.

There are a number of hotels, bed and breakfasts and campsites to accommodate the large number of visitors that travel to the area all year round.

Rhayader is also home to a community founded art and heritage complex which includes a museum and gallery, a leisure centre, numerous parks and all the amenities expected of a larger town. Potter Phil Rogers had his studio in Rhayader. There are shops, cash facilities, restaurants, takeaways and supermarkets catering to both the local population and visitors to the area.

Rhayader is also renowned for being the town with the highest concentration of pubs and drinking establishments, per capita, in the UK, with one to each 173 people.

In nearby Nant-glas, across the river Wye from the village of Llanwrthwl, the Living Willow Theatre, an open-air theatre constructed of living willow trees, was opened in 2007.

== Sport ==
Rhayader Town F.C., despite previously having some success in the League of Wales - the top-tier of domestic Welsh football between 1997 and 2002, ceased to exist in the summer of 2006. The club has since reformed, and in its inaugural season gained promotion into the Spar Mid Wales League. A subsequent promotion to the Cymru Alliance followed, but a finishing position of 15th saw the team relegated after just one season. The town's rugby union team play in the Cambrian Training Mid Wales League. There is also a cricket club and thriving local darts, dominos and pool leagues.

The town is also well known by motocross fans. Every summer a series of events take place at the nearby Cwmythig Hill circuit, with many of Britain's top riders taking part. The race series regularly attracts over 5,000 spectators.

As part of the annual carnival celebrations, Rhayader also plays host to a number of World Championship events in lesser celebrated sports, including wheelbarrow racing and rock-paper-scissors.

== Development ==
Rhayader and its surrounding districts are supported by development organisation Rhayader 2000 Ltd, established in 1996 to revive Rhayader's economy. Rhayader 2000 Ltd is a voluntary sector organisation representing a cross section of the local community. It builds links with Powys County Council, Rhayader Town Council, local businesses and charitable and voluntary organisations.

== In popular culture ==
Jasper Fforde's novels Shades of Grey: The Road to High Saffron and Red Side Story are suggested to be located in a dystopian version of Rhayader called East Carmine.
