= List of castles in Wales =

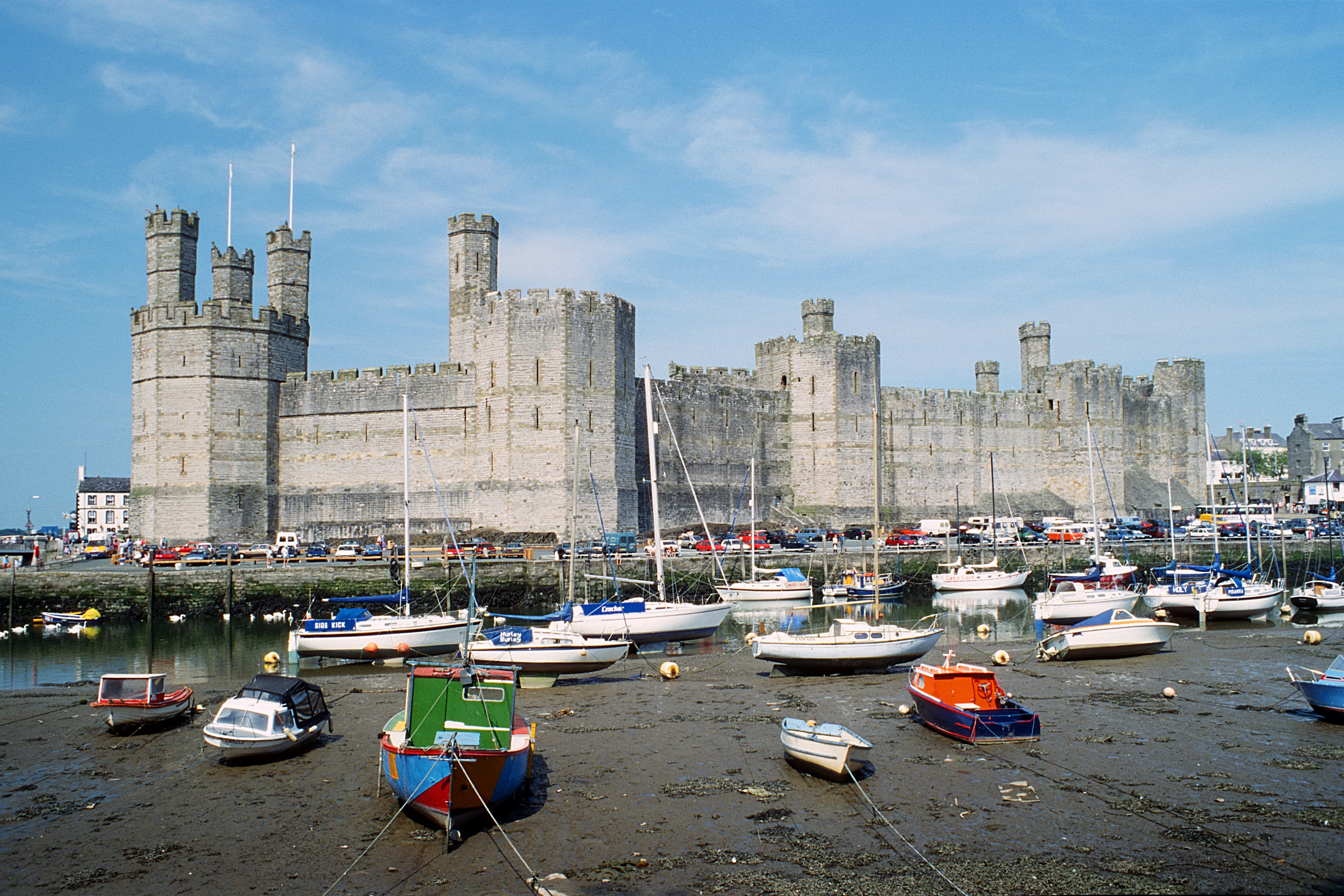
Caernarfon Castle

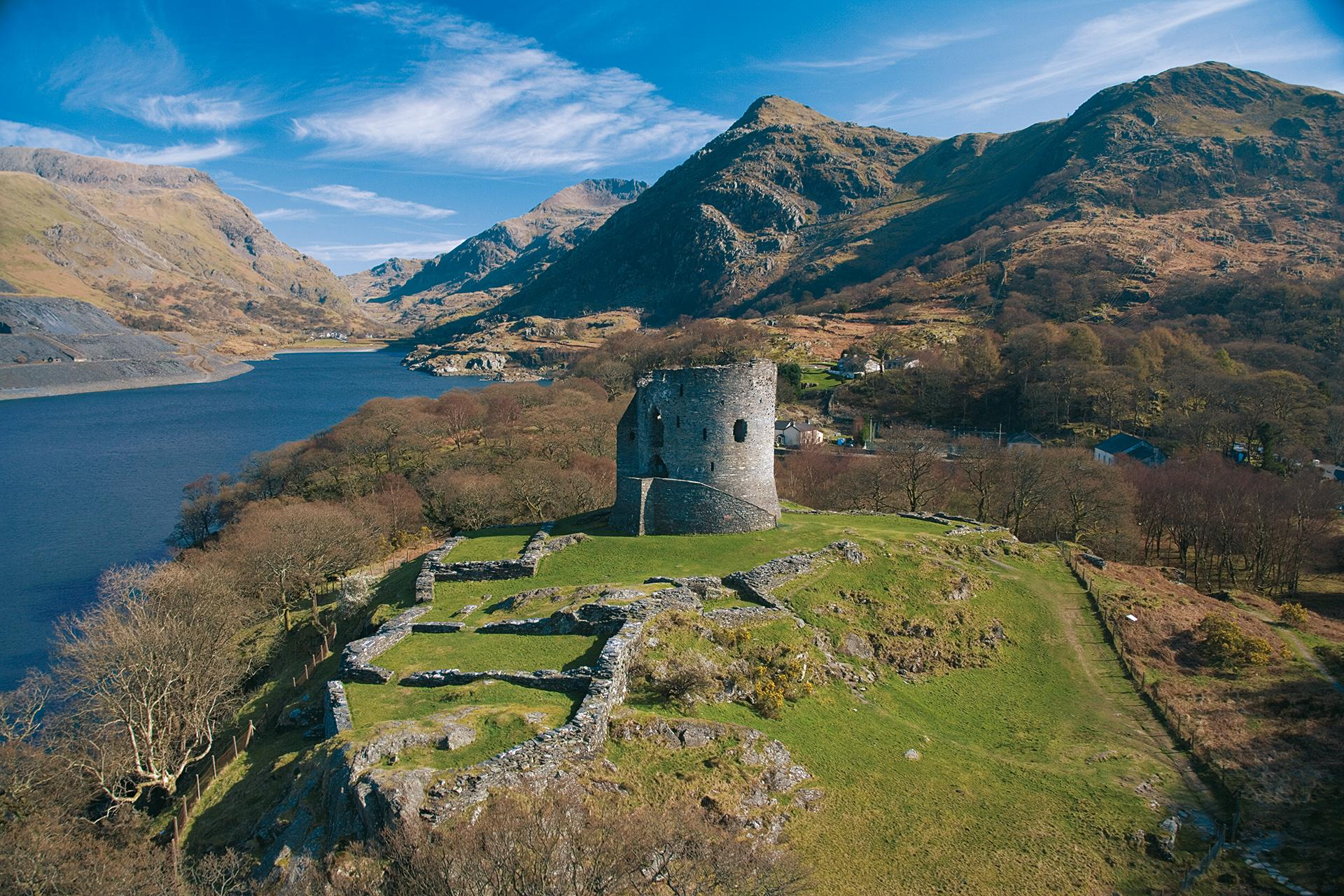
Dolbadarn Castle

A reconstruction of Holt Castle in 1495

Wales is sometimes called the "castle capital of the world" because of the large number of castles in a relatively small area. Wales had about 400 castles, of which over 100 are still standing, either as ruins or as restored buildings. The rest have returned to nature, and today consist of ditches, mounds, and earthworks, often in commanding positions. Many of the sites in Wales are cared for by Cadw, the Welsh government's historic environment service.

The four castles of Beaumaris, Caernarfon, Conwy, and Harlech together make up the Castles and Town Walls of King Edward in Gwynedd World Heritage Site, considered to be the "finest examples of late 13th century and early 14th century military architecture in Europe".

== Bridgend ==
Castles of which only earthworks, fragments, or nothing remains include:

- Llangewydd Castle
- Nolton Castle, Bridgend
- Stormy Castle

Name	Image	Type	Date	Condition	Ownership / Access	Notes
Candleston Castle	Candleston Castle 2009	Fortified manor house	14th century	Ruined		Only the tower remains of a C14 fortified manor house built by the de Cantelupes.
Coity Castle	Coity Castle, Nr Bridgend	Keep and bailey	12th - 14th centuries	Ruined	Cadw	Prominently sited above Heol West Plas, Coity Castle was founded in the early twelfth century and was granted to the Norman family of Turberville.
Kenfig Castle	Ruins of Kenfig Castle	Keep and bailey	12th century	Fragmentary remains		The scanty remains of Kenfig Castle, a once great medieval fortress, rise from the dunes beside the Cynfig river.
Llangynwyd Castle	Overgrown ruins of Llangynwyd Castle		12th century	Fragmentary remains		At Llangynwyd the remains of a once splendid medieval fortress are now reduced to scanty ruins and earthworks.
Newcastle	Newcastle Castle - Bridgend	Enclosure castle	12th century	Ruined	Cadw	The castle's most outstanding feature is its complete Norman doorway, which greets the visitor approaching the castle from the south.

== Caerphilly ==
Name	Image	Type	Date	Condition	Ownership / Access	Notes
Caerphilly Castle	Caerphilly Castle	Concentric castle	13th - 14th century	Ruined, with partial restoration	Cadw	Caerphilly is the largest medieval castle in Wales and one of the most impressive in Europe.
Morgraig Castle	Ruins of Castell Morgraig	Enclosure castle	13th century	Fragmentary remains		Built between 1243 and 1267, the form of the castle is unusual and has no comparisons elsewhere. Debate has centred on whether the castle was built by the Welsh Lords of Senghenydd, or by the Norman Lords of Glamorgan.
Ruperra Castle	Ruperra Castle	Mock castle	17th century	Ruined	Private	Built c1626 by Sir Thomas Morgan, steward to the Earl of Pembroke, and the latest example of the Elizabethan and Jacobean court taste for castellated mansions.
Ruperra Motte	Ruperra Castle	Motte and bailey	12th century	Ruined, with partial restoration	Ruperra Conservation Trust	The site includes remains of a medieval castle motte on a much earlier Iron Age hillfort.

== Cardiff ==
Castles of which only earthworks or nothing remains include:

- Caer Castell Camp
- Morganstown Castle Mound
- Rumney Castle
- Treoda Castle Mound
- Twmpath Castle

Name	Image	Type	Date	Condition	Ownership / Access	Notes
Cardiff Castle	Cardiff Castle	Shell Keep	11th century	Ruined, with partial restoration	Cardiff Council	Cardiff Castle was established within the walls of a mighty Roman fort by William I of England in about 1081.
Castell Coch	Castell Coch - exterior	Gothic Revival	19th century (Originally 11th century)	Intact	Cadw	Castell Coch, located on a prominent wooded hillside overlooking the Taff Valley and the northern part of Cardiff, is a remarkable blend of solid medieval masonry and High Victorian Gothic fantasy.
St Fagans Castle	St Fagans Castle	Enclosure castle	13th century	Ruined	National Museum Wales	The remains of the medieval castle at St Fagans include the southern part of a stone curtain wall. The enclosure is currently overlain by an Elizabethan mansion, with part of the surviving curtain serving to define its forecourt.
Bishop's Palace, Llandaff	St Fagans Castle	Concentric castle	13th century	Ruined	Cardiff Council	Bishop's Palace is also known as Llandaff Castle or Bishop's Castle

== Carmarthenshire ==
Castles of which only earthworks or nothing remains include:

- Allt y Ferin
- Banc y Bettws
- Bank Llwyndomen
- Castell Aber Cafwy
- Castell Bach
- Castell Du
- Castell Llwyn Bedw
- Castell Mawr
- Castell Meurig
- Castell Moel
- Castell Nonni
- Castell Pencader
- Castell y Domen
- Castell y Garreg
- Castell y Rhingyll
- Castelldwyran
- Garn Fawr Motte
- Glan Mynys Mount
- Hendy Castle
- Llanddowror Motte
- Llandre Egremont
- Llanelli Old Castle
- Llanglydwen
- Llanllwni Mount
- Parc y Domen
- Pen y Cnap
- Pencastell
- Roche Castle
- St Clears
- Talley Mound
- Tir y Dail Motte
- Tomenlawddog
- Tomenseba
- Waun Ddu
- Waun Tympath

Name	Image	Type	Date	Condition	Ownership / Access	Notes
Carmarthen Castle	Main gateway to Castell Caerfyrddin / Carmarthen Castle	Shell Keep	11th century	Ruined	Carmarthenshire Council	Remains of the high medieval castle, including a shell keep, gatehouse and two towers, are obscured by modern buildings, notably County Hall.
Carreg Cennen Castle	Carreg Cennen Castle	Enclosure castle	13th century	Ruined	Cadw	Spectacularly set on a crag over the upper Cennen valley. A vaulted passage runs from the SE corner to a cave below E outer ward.
Dinefwr Castle	The circular keep of Dinefwr Castle		12th century		Cadw	Dinefwr castle is thought to have been founded in the later twelfth century by Rhys ap Gruffudd, the Lord Rhys, and became known as the traditional capital of Dyfed.
Dryslwyn Castle	Dryslwyn Castle		13th century		Cadw	The shattered ruins of a medieval castle crown the ultimate summit of a dramatically isolated and abrupt hill rising from the Tywi floodplain.
Kidwelly Castle	The great gatehouse, Kidwelly Castle		12th century and earlier	Ruined	Cadw	Kidwelly Castle is an imposing ruin, situated on a scarp above the upper tidal limit of the Gwendraeth Fach Estuary, and considered one of the finest castles in Wales.
Laugharne Castle	Laugharne Castle		13th century		Cadw	The castle of Laugharne was built by the Anglo-Normans in the early twelfth century and is probably mentioned in 1116, but the existing ruins are thirteenth century and later.
Llandovery Castle	Llandovery Castle		11th century	Ruined		Llandovery Castle is a motte and bailey castle first mentioned in 1113. Extensive remains of masonry walls and towers occupy the motte, and a shell keep enclosure is represented by half-buried footings.
Llansteffan Castle	Llansteffan Castle		12th century		Cadw	Prominently situated on a rocky promontory, overlooking the mouth of the Tywi. Substantial and impressive remains of a rubble masonry castle dating from the C12 to C15.
Castell Moel	Castell Moel from Llansteffan Road		16th century			Shattered ruins of a possibly 16th but probably 17th century house ruins; an early wing was incorporated into large cruciform renaissance house.
Newcastle Emlyn Castle	Newcastle Emlyn Castle		13th & 15th century			Shattered ruins remain of Newcastle Emlyn Castle. Excavation through the 1980s have revealed some details, but the castle is best known from a collection of medieval accounts and surveys.

== Ceredigion ==
Castles of which only earthworks or nothing remains include:

- Aberdyfi Castle
- Adpar Motte
- Blaenporth Castle
- Caer Penrhos
- Castell Abereinon
- Castell Cadwgan
- Castell Caerwedros
- Castell Dol Wllf
- Castell Gwallter
- Castell Gwynionydd
- Castell Hywel
- Castell Llwyn Gwinau
- Castell Nant y Garan
- Castell Pistog
- Castell Pridd
- Castell Trefilan
- Crugyn Dimai
- Dinerth Castle
- Lampeter Castle
- Llanrhystud Castle
- Llanwnen Castle
- Llwynduris Castle
- Manian Fawr
- Nant yr Arian Castle
- Nantperchellan
- Pen y Castell, Llanilar
- Penycastell, Eithin-gleision
- Rheidol Castle
- St Marys Old Church Motte
- Tan y Castell
- Tomen Llanio
- Tomen Rhyd Owen
- Ystrad Meurig Castle
- Ystrad Peithyll

Name	Image	Type	Date	Condition	Ownership / Access	Notes
Aberystwyth Castle	External view of the North Gate	Concentric castle	13th century	Ruined	Aberystwyth Town Council	Work on Aberystwyth Castle commenced in 1277 under Edward I and was completed in 1289. The castle remains have been much restored and now form part of a public park.
Cardigan Castle	Cardigan Castle	Motte and bailey	13th century		Ceredigion County Council	Situated on promontory overlooking Cardigan Bridge. Portions of the curtain wall survive in the tall embankment overlooking the bridge. There are remains of three semi-circular towers, the largest & most elaborate incorporated into the early C19 Castle Green House

== Conwy ==
Name	Image	Type	Date	Condition	Ownership / Access	Notes
Conwy Castle	Conwy Castle	Enclosure castle	13th century	Ruined, with partial restoration	Cadw	
Deganwy Castle	Castell Deganwy Castle (Welsh: Caer Ddegannwy; Modern Welsh: Castell Degannwy) was an early stronghold of Gwynedd and lies in Deganwy at the mouth of the River Conwy in Conwy, North Wales.		13th century	Earthworks remain		
Dolwyddelan Castle	Dolwyddelan Castle		13th century	Partially ruinous	Cadw	
Gwrych Castle	Gwrych Castle		19th century	Derelict, being restored	Gwrych Castle Preservation Trust	Mock Gothic
Gwydir Castle	Gwydir Castle		16th century	Intact	Private	

== Denbighshire ==
Name	Image	Type	Date	Condition	Ownership / Access	Notes
Bodelwyddan Castle	Bodelwyddan Castle		19th century (Originally 15th)			
Denbigh Castle	Denbigh Castle		13th -14th century		Cadw	
Dinas Brân	VIew of Dinas Brân		12th century			
Dyserth Castle	Remains Of Dyserth Castle, Flintshire		13th century			
Rhuddlan Castle	Rhuddlan Castle from the west.		13th century		Cadw	
Ruthin Castle	The old part.		13th century		Hotel	
Twthill, Rhuddlan	Twthill Castle		11th century		Cadw	
Prestatyn Castle	Prestatyn Castle (Motte and Bailey)		12th century Motte & Bailey castle			

== Flintshire ==
Name	Image	Type	Date	Condition	Ownership / Access	Notes
Caergwrle Castle	A ruined wall on a hilltop.		13th century		Cadw	
Ewloe Castle	Ewloe Castle		12th century		Cadw	
Flint Castle	Flint Castle in Wales		13th century		Cadw	
Hawarden Castle	Hawarden 'Old' Castle		13th century			
New Hawarden Castle	New Hawarden Castle 2006		18th century			
Mold Castle	The outer bailey of Mold Castle		12th century			

== Gwynedd ==
Name	Image	Type	Date	Condition	Ownership / Access	Notes
Bryn Bras Castle	Bryn Bras castle		19th century			
Caernarfon Castle	Caernarfon Castle, western view at low tide		13th century	Ruined, with partial restoration	Cadw	
Carndochan Castle	Castell Carndochan, near to Rhosdylluan, Gwynedd, Wales.		13th century			
Castell y Bere	View over Castell y Bere		13th century		Cadw	
Criccieth Castle	Criccieth Castle		13th century		Cadw	
Dinas Emrys	A view up the hillock, covered with vegetation.		12th century keep on early medieval site			
Dolbadarn Castle	Dolbadarn Castle		13th century		Cadw	
Harlech Castle	Harlech Castle		13th century		Cadw	
Penrhyn Castle	Penrhyn Castle		19th century	Intact	National Trust	

== Isle of Anglesey ==
Name	Image	Type	Date	Condition	Ownership / Access	Notes
Castell Aberlleiniog	Two of Castell Aberlleiniog's towers and keep wall in 2009, after restoration had begun		12th century			
Beaumaris Castle	Beaumaris Castle	Concentric castle	13th century		Cadw	

== Merthyr Tydfil ==
Name	Image	Type	Date	Condition	Ownership / Access	Notes
Morlais Castle	Picture of the only remaining room at Morlais castle.		13th century			
Cyfarthfa Castle	Front view of Cyfarthfa Castle, Merthyr Tydfil, South Wales.		19th century			

== Monmouthshire ==
Name	Image	Type	Date	Condition	Ownership / Access	Notes
Abergavenny Castle	Abergavenny Castle curtain wall interior. Abergavenny Castle is a castle in the town of Abergavenny, Monmouthshire in south east Wales.		11th to 13th century			
Betws Newydd			Castle 11th century			
Caldicot Castle	The front entrance of Caldicot Castle in south Wales.		12th to 15th century			
Castell Arnold	Site of Castle Arnold		12th century			Near Llanover
Chepstow Castle	Chepstow Castle		11th to 14th century		Cadw	
Dingestow Castle	Ditch at Dingestow Castle		11th and 12th century			Two castles, one 11th century the other 12th
Grosmont Castle	Grosmont Castle		12th to 14th century		Cadw	
Llanfair Kilgeddin Castle	Llanfair Kilgeddin motte		11th century			
Llantrisant, Monmouthshire Castell Troggy	Remains of Cas Troggy		13th century			
Llanvair Discoed Castle	Llanvair Discoed Castle ruins from St. Mary's churchyard		12th to 13th century			
Monmouth Castle	Ruins of the 12th century castle at Monmouth		11th to 13th century		Cadw	
Newcastle			11th century			
Penrhos Castle			11th century			
Pen y Clawdd Castle			11th century			Near Abergavenny
Raglan Castle	Raglan Castle		15th century		Cadw	
Skenfrith Castle	Great Tower, Skenfrith Castle		12th to 13th century		Cadw	
Tregrug Castle	Part of Llangibby Castle ruins		13th century			
Trellech Castle	Tump Terret		12th century			
Usk Castle	Garrison Tower from the inner ward		12th to 14th century			
White Castle	White Castle		11th to 13th century		Cadw	

== Neath Port Talbot ==
Name	Image	Type	Date	Condition	Ownership / Access	Notes
Margam Castle	Margam Castle		19th century		Neath Port Talbot County Borough Council	
Neath Castle	Neath Castle		12th century		Neath Town Council	

== Newport ==
Castle with only earthworks, Wentloog Castle.

Name	Image	Type	Date	Condition	Ownership / Access	Notes
Caerleon Castle	Round Tower at The Hanbury Arms, 2010		11th to 13th century			
Newport Castle	Newport Castle		13th century		Cadw	
Pencoed Castle	Probably part of the earlier castle.		13th century			
Penhow Castle	Penhow castle viewed from the parish church		12th century			

== Pembrokeshire ==
Name	Image	Type	Date	Condition	Ownership / Access	Notes
Benton Castle	Benton Castle		no date			
Carew Castle	Domestic Tudor-period ranges from across the mill pond to the north west		11th to 16th century		Private / Open to the public	
Cilgerran Castle	West tower, and access bridge to the inner ward over gully		13th century		Cadw	
Haverfordwest Castle	Haverfordwest Castle		12th century			
Llawhaden Castle	Llawhaden Castle Gatehouse today		12th to 14th century		Cadw	
Manorbier Castle	Manorbier Castle		12th to 14th century		Private / Open to the public	
Narberth Castle	Narberth castle ruins in Pembrokeshire, Wales, looking towards the south.		13th century			
Newport Castle			19th century			
Pembroke Castle			12th & 13th century		Private / Open to the public	
Picton Castle	Picton Castle in 2013		12th century		Picton Castle Trust	
Roch Castle	Roch Castle		12th century		Private	
Tenby Castle	A gate leading to Tenby Castle.		13th century			
Upton Castle			13th century		Private	
Wiston Castle	Wiston Castle in April 2006		12th century		Cadw	
Wolf's Castle	Wolf's Castle motte from the east	Motte and bailey	11th century			

== Powys ==
Castles of which only earthworks, fragments or nothing remains include:

- Aberllynfi Castle
- Barland Castle
- Beguildy Castle
- Bleddfa Castle
- Builth Castle
- Buddugre Castle
- Burfa Castle
- Castell Crugerydd
- Castell Dinas
- Castell Du
- Castle Kinsey
- Castle Nimble
- Clyro Castle
- Colwyn Castle
- Crug Eryr Castle
- Cymaron Castle
- Dinieithon Castle
- Evenjobb Castle
- Glan Edw Castle
- Glasbury Castle
- Hen Domen
- Knighton Castles
- Knucklas Castle
- Llanafan-Fawr Castle
- Llanidloes Castle
- Mathrafal
- New Radnor Castle
- Painscastle Castle
- Penarth Castle
- Rhayader Castle
- Tinboeth Castle
- Tomen Castle
- Womaston Castle

Name	Image	Type	Date	Condition	Ownership / Access	Notes
Aberedw Castle	Still standing About the only part of Aberedw castle that can be construed as a wall and in surprisingly good condition.		11th to 13th century			Two castles, one 11th and one 13th century
Blaenllyfni Castle	The ruins of Blaenllyfni Castle		13th century			
Brecon Castle	Brecon Castle		11th century		Hotel	
Bronllys Castle	Bronllys Castle motte and tower		12th century		Cadw	
Cefnllys Castle	Southern castle at Cefnllys	Hill castle	12th century	Fragmentary remains		Three castles, an 11th-century motte and bailey followed by two 13th-century masonry castles.
Crickhowell Castle	Remains of Crickhowell Castle		12th century			
Dolforwyn Castle	Dolforwyn Castle, Powys		13th century		Cadw	
Hay Castle	Hay Castle, Hay-on-Wye		11th or 12th century		Hay Castle Trust	
Llanthomas Castle Mound	Llanthomas Castle Mound		11th or 12th century		Private	
Maesllwch Castle	Maesllwch Castle		19th century		Private	19th-century house in castellated style
Montgomery Castle	The ruined gatehouse to the inner ward seen from the south		13th century		Cadw	
Powis Castle	Powis Castle, originally built c. 1200 as a fortress of the Welsh Princes of Powys.		12th to 19th century		National Trust	
Tretower Castle	Tretower Castle		12th century		Cadw	

== Rhondda Cynon Taf ==
Castles of which only earthworks, fragments or nothing remains include:

Castell Nos

Name	Image	Type	Date	Condition	Ownership / Access	Notes
Llantrisant Castle	The remains of Llantrisant Castle		13th century			

== Swansea ==
Name	Image	Type	Date	Condition	Ownership / Access	Notes
Loughor Castle	Loughor Castle		12th century		Cadw	
Oxwich Castle	Oxwich Castle and dovecote		16th century		Cadw	
Oystermouth Castle	Oystermouth Castle		12th & 13th century		City and County of Swansea Council	
Pennard Castle	Castell Pennard		12th century		Pennard Golf Course	
Penrice Castle	The 18th-century mansion (left) and the remains of the castle (right)		13th century		Private	
Swansea Castle	The remaining ruins of Swansea Castle seen from across Castle Street.		12th century		Cadw	
Weobley Castle	The west face of Weobley Castle		13th century		Cadw	

== Vale of Glamorgan ==
Castles of which only earthworks, fragments or nothing remains include:

- Dinas Powis
- Wrinstone Castle

Name	Image	Type	Date	Condition	Ownership / Access	Notes
Barry Castle	Barry Castle, Barry, Vale of Glamorgan		13th - 14th century		Cadw	
Fonmon Castle	Fonmon Castle, Vale of Glamorgan, Wales		14th century		Private	
Hensol Castle	South elevation of Hensol Castle, March 2003		18th century		Private	
Ogmore Castle	Stepping Stones on River Ogmore, Ogmore Castle		12th century		Cadw	
Old Beaupre Castle	Inner courtyard and Renaissance porch		16th century		Cadw	
Penmark Castle	Penmark_Castle,_seen_from_the_churchyard		12th century			
St Donat's Castle	St Donat's Castle		12th century		Atlantic College	
St Quintins Castle	Saint Quentin's castle, Llanblethian		14th century		Cadw	

== Wrexham ==
Name	Image	Type	Date	Condition	Ownership / Access	Notes
Chirk Castle	Chirk Castle with Adam's Tower in Far Left Side		13th century		National Trust	
Holt Castle	Remains of Holt Castle		13th century			

== See also ==
- Castles in Great Britain and Ireland
- Castles in England
- Castles in Scotland
- Castles in Northern Ireland
- Castles in the Isle of Man

International:

- List of castles
