= List of Roman-to-modern scheduled monuments in Powys (Radnorshire) =

Scheduled Monuments in Radnorshire, Powys, Wales.
=Roman =Early Medieval =Medieval
=Post-Medieval/Modern

Powys is the largest administrative county in Wales. With an over a quarter of Wales's land area, covering much of the eastern half of the country, it is a county of remote uplands, low population and no coastline. It was created in more or less its current form in 1974, and is the only one of the large county units created at that time to have been carried forward intact at the 1996 local government re-organisation. It comprises three historic counties, namely Montgomeryshire, Radnorshire, and most of Brecknockshire. There are 950 Scheduled monuments within the county, which is far more than can be sensibly covered in one list. Each of the 3 historic counties is therefore listed separately, and each of these has two lists - one for the prehistoric sites and one for the Roman, medieval and post-medieval sites.

This list shows the sites dating to Roman, medieval and post-medieval times in Radnorshire, which occupies the central third of Powys. The River Wye separates it from Brecknockshire to the south, and Montgomeryshire forms the northern third of Powys. Of the 258 Scheduled monuments in Radnorshire, 139 date to prehistoric times. The 119 on this list include 14 Roman sites, all related to the military occupation of Wales. The 14 Early Medieval sites are mostly sections of Offa's Dyke, but also include two inscribed stones. The 82 medieval sites are overwhelmingly defensive structures, particularly mottes, but also including castles, settlements, town defences and an Abbey. Of the nine post-medieval sites, only one is industrial, with five abandoned settlements and three World War II structures.

The lists of Scheduled Monuments in Powys are as follows:-

- List of Scheduled prehistoric Monuments in Powys (Brecknockshire) (254 sites)
- List of Scheduled Roman to modern Monuments in Powys (Brecknockshire) (135 sites)
- List of Scheduled prehistoric Monuments in Powys (Radnorshire) (139 sites)
- List of Scheduled Roman to modern Monuments in Powys (Radnorshire) (119 sites - shown below)
- List of Scheduled prehistoric Monuments in Powys (Montgomeryshire) (190 sites)
- List of Scheduled Roman to modern Monuments in Powys (Montgomeryshire) (113 sites)

Scheduled Ancient Monuments (SAMs) have statutory protection. It is illegal to disturb the ground surface or any standing remains. The compilation of the list is undertaken by Cadw Welsh Historic Monuments, which is an executive agency of the National Assembly of Wales. The list of scheduled monuments below is supplied by Cadw with additional material from RCAHMW and Clwyd-Powys Archaeological Trust.

== Scheduled Roman, medieval and post-medieval monuments in Radnorshire ==
The list is sorted by period, and then by Community so that sites of similar age and locality are placed near each other. Clicking on the heading arrows will sort the list by that information.

Image	Name	Site type	Community	Location	Details	Period	SAM No & Refs
	Gaer	Fort	Clyro	52.0842°N 3.1273°W, SO228434		Roman	RD124
	Llandrindod Common Roman Practice Camps	Practice camp	Disserth and Trecoed	52.2307°N 3.3862°W, SO542600		Roman	RD134
	Roman Earthworks S of Llandrindod Wells	Enclosure	Disserth and Trecoed	52.2312°N 3.3849°W, SO055601		Roman	RD126
	Disserth Roman Fortlet	Fort	Disserth and Trecoed	52.1748°N 3.4556°W, SO005539	(revealed by aerial photography)	Roman	RD137
	Gaer Roman Site	Enclosure	Gladestry	52.1391°N 3.1471°W, SO215496		Roman	RD005
	Llandrindod Wells Roman Road	Road	Llandrindod Wells	52.2337°N 3.3868°W, SO053604		Roman	RD259
	Castell Collen	Fort	Llanyre	52.2558°N 3.3843°W, SO056628		Roman	RD001
	Ty Lettice Roman Road	Road	Nantmel	52.3067°N 3.4749°W, SN995686		Roman	RD260
	Roman Fort E of Hindwell Farm	Fort	Old Radnor	52.2382°N 3.0877°W, SO258605		Roman	RD136
	Three Roman Camps (revealed by aerial photography) NE of Walton	Marching camp	Old Radnor	52.2324°N 3.0948°W, SO253599		Roman	RD138
	Penybont Common Roman road and early turnpike road	Road	Penybont	52.2755°N 3.2807°W, SO127649		Roman	RD258
	Esgairperfedd Marching Camp	Marching camp	Rhayader	52.3162°N 3.5798°W, SN924698		Roman	RD131
	Roman Marching Camp (revealed by aerial photography) 500m SSE of Glan-yr-Afon	Marching camp	St Harmon	52.3334°N 3.4902°W, SN985716		Roman	RD133
	St Harmon Roman Road	Road	St Harmon	52.3321°N 3.4952°W, SN982715		Roman	RD261
	Short Ditch near Beacon Lodge	Linear earthwork	Beguildy	52.3656°N 3.1911°W, SO189748		Early Medieval	RD089
	Cross Slab in Llowes Church	Cross-marked stone	Glasbury	52.068°N 3.1795°W, SO192417		Early Medieval	RD100
	Offa's Dyke: Section extending 165m S to Fildas Place and thence from Mill stream to Frydd Wood	Linear earthwork	Knighton	52.3431°N 3.0541°W, SO282721		Early Medieval	RD016
	Offa's Dyke: Section extending 200m S to Pool House, Rhos-y-Meirch	Linear earthwork	Knighton	52.3214°N 3.0593°W, SO278697		Early Medieval	RD018
	Offa's Dyke: Section extending 202m from River Teme to West Street	Linear earthwork	Knighton	52.3468°N 3.053°W, SO283725		Early Medieval	RD015
	Offa's Dyke: Section extending through Great Ffrydd Wood 1693m S to footpath leading to Woodhouse Lane	Linear earthwork	Knighton	52.3363°N 3.0557°W, SO281714		Early Medieval	RD017
	Offa's Dyke: Section extending 380m from Burfa	Linear earthwork	Old Radnor	52.2431°N 3.0583°W, SO278610		Early Medieval	RD024
	Offa's Dyke: Section from Ditchyeld Bridge to County Boundary	Linear earthwork	Old Radnor	52.2388°N 3.0559°W, SO279605		Early Medieval	RD025
	Offa's Dyke: Section from Granner Wood to Burfa	Linear earthwork	Old Radnor	52.2514°N 3.0653°W, SO273620		Early Medieval	RD023
	Pillar Stone in Church	Cross-marked stone	Painscastle	52.1377°N 3.1896°W, SO186494		Early Medieval	RD101
	Offa's Dyke: Section extending 1125m SW to Gilfach Wood	Linear earthwork	Presteigne	52.2914°N 3.0575°W, SO279664		Early Medieval	RD020
	Offa's Dyke: Section from Whitton-Presteigne Road to River Lugg	Linear earthwork	Presteigne	52.2837°N 3.0645°W, SO274655		Early Medieval	RD021
	Offa's Dyke: Section extending 1960m from Yew Tree Farm to Quarries NE of Granner Wood	Linear earthwork	Whitton	52.2746°N 3.0709°W, SO270645		Early Medieval	RD022
	Offa's Dyke: Section extending 2143m S from The Firs, Rhos-y-Meirch	Linear earthwork	Whitton	52.3091°N 3.0491°W, SO285684		Early Medieval	RD019
	Abbey Cwmhir Great Park Shed	Building (Unclassified)	Abbey Cwmhir	52.3404°N 3.3821°W, SO059722		Medieval	RD163
Cwmhir Abbey walls	Cwmhir Abbey	Abbey	Abbey Cwmhir	52.3297°N 3.3875°W, SO055710		Medieval	RD012
Walls and moat of Aberedw Castle	Aberedw Castle	Castle	Aberedw	52.1171°N 3.3502°W, SO076473		Medieval	RD029
Motte on the hill: Aberedw castle mound	Aberedw Castle Mound	Motte	Aberedw	52.1153°N 3.3473°W, SO078472		Medieval	RD117
	Cefn Wylfre Deserted Rural Settlement	House platform	Aberedw	52.1487°N 3.2647°W, SO135508		Medieval	RD186
	Cefn Wylfre Platform House	Platform house	Aberedw	52.1487°N 3.2569°W, SO140507		Medieval	RD179
	Cwm-piban Platform House	Platform house	Aberedw	52.1358°N 3.2579°W, SO140493		Medieval	RD188
	Cwmblaenerw House Platforms	House platform	Aberedw	52.1539°N 3.306°W, SO107514		Medieval	RD170
Cnwclas (or Knucklas) castle hill	Knucklas Castle	Castle	Beguildy	52.3635°N 3.1028°W, SO250745	Now a wooded hill in the care of the Knucklas Castle Community Land Project. Also spelled Cnwclas Castle.	Medieval	RD085
	Crugyn Tump Castle Mound	Motte	Beguildy	52.423°N 3.2238°W, SO168812		Medieval	RD086
	Castle Kinsey	Motte	Clyro	52.0956°N 3.1468°W, SO215447		Medieval	RD067
	Clyro Castle	Motte	Clyro	52.0849°N 3.1475°W, SO214435		Medieval	RD066
	Lower House Moated Site	Moated Site	Clyro	52.0934°N 3.1321°W, SO225445		Medieval	RD148
	Caer Du	Enclosure	Disserth and Trecoed	52.2217°N 3.3864°W, SO053590		Unknown	RD030
	Earthwork 100m N of Caer Du, Howey	Enclosure	Disserth and Trecoed	52.2228°N 3.3865°W, SO053591		Medieval	RD145
	Dolbedwin Castle Mound	Motte	Gladestry	52.1344°N 3.162°W, SO205490		Medieval	RD099
	Boughrood Castle	Motte	Glasbury	52.0439°N 3.2664°W, SO132391		Medieval	RD072
	Castle Tump	Motte	Glasbury	52.0588°N 3.1816°W, SO190407		Medieval	RD135
Colwyn Castle, Powys, aerial view	Colwyn Castle	Motte & Bailey	Glascwm	52.1766°N 3.3075°W, SO106539		Medieval	RD035
	Cwm-Twrch Medieval Settlement	Deserted Rural Settlement	Glascwm	52.1826°N 3.238°W, SO154545		Medieval	RD165
	Fforest Wood Mound & Bailey Castle	Motte & Bailey	Glascwm	52.1669°N 3.3161°W, SO100528		Medieval	RD075
	Garnfawr Deserted Rural Settlement	Rectangular hut	Glascwm	52.2095°N 3.3153°W, SO102576		Medieval	RD184
	Gellidywyll Platform Settlement	Deserted Rural Settlement	Glascwm	52.1669°N 3.2541°W, SO143528		Medieval	RD168
	Nant Brook Enclosure	Enclosure	Glascwm	52.2257°N 3.2747°W, SO130593		Unknown	RD147
	Pant y Rhiw Medieval Settlement	Deserted Rural Settlement	Glascwm	52.2069°N 3.3466°W, SO080573		Medieval	RD158
	Penarth Mount Castle Mound	Motte	Glascwm	52.1649°N 3.2829°W, SO123526		Medieval	RD076
	The Mount Mound & Bailey Castle, Hundred House	Motte & Bailey	Glascwm	52.1793°N 3.2935°W, SO116542		Medieval	RD036
	Upper House Platform House	Platform house	Glascwm	52.203°N 3.3543°W, SO075569		Medieval	RD175
	Bryn y Castell	Motte	Knighton	52.3431°N 3.0434°W, SO290721		Medieval	RD054
	Knighton Mound & Bailey Castle	Motte & Bailey	Knighton	52.3442°N 3.0521°W, SO284723		Medieval	RD053
	Long Wood Camp	Enclosure	Knighton	52.3302°N 2.9867°W, SO328706		Medieval	RD096
	Stanage Mound & Bailey Castle	Motte & Bailey	Knighton	52.3516°N 2.9836°W, SO331730		Medieval	RD055
	Castell y Blaidd Medieval Settlement	Deserted Rural Settlement	Llanbadarn Fynydd	52.4072°N 3.2918°W, SO122795		Medieval	RD155
	Ffoeslaprey Settlement	Deserted Rural Settlement	Llanbister	52.3519°N 3.2209°W, SO169733		Medieval	RD172
	Moelfre Hill Deserted Rural Settlement	Platform house	Llanbister	52.376°N 3.2986°W, SO116761		Medieval	RD171
	Rhos-crug Hill Settlement	House platform	Llanbister	52.3532°N 3.2127°W, SO174734		Medieval	RD268
	Rhos-crug Hut Platform (E)	House platform	Llanbister	52.3528°N 3.2122°W, SO175734		Medieval	RD267
	Rhos-crug Hut Platform (W)	House platform	Llanbister	52.3525°N 3.217°W, SO172734		Medieval	RD269
	Castell Cwm Aran	Motte & Bailey	Llanddewi Ystradenny	52.3243°N 3.2445°W, SO152703		Medieval	RD095
	Tomen Bedd Ugre Mound & Bailey Castle	Motte & Bailey	Llanddewi Ystradenny	52.3173°N 3.3209°W, SO100696		Medieval	RD092
	Caer Fawr Medieval Settlement	House platform	Llanelwedd	52.1679°N 3.3816°W, SO056530		Medieval	RD164
	Castell Cae-Maerdy Castle Mound	Motte	Llanelwedd	52.1669°N 3.4129°W, SO034530		Medieval	RD121
	Cwrt Llechryd moated site	Moated Site	Llanelwedd	52.1685°N 3.4248°W, SO026532		Medieval	RD140
	Mound & Bailey Castle, Bleddfa	Motte & Bailey	Llangunllo	52.3072°N 3.1622°W, SO208683		Medieval	RD061
	Mynachdy Moated Enclosure	Moated Site	Llangunllo	52.32°N 3.1315°W, SO229697		Medieval	RD097
	Llyn Gwyn Earthwork	Earthwork (unclassified)	Nantmel	52.2747°N 3.4486°W, SO012650		Unknown	RD079
	Cae-Banal Castle Mound	Motte	New Radnor	52.222°N 3.2126°W, SO172588		Medieval	RD108
	Crug Eryr Mound and Bailey Castle	Motte & Bailey	New Radnor	52.2254°N 3.2348°W, SO157593		Medieval	RD003
	New Radnor Medieval Town: South West Quadrant	Town	New Radnor	52.2393°N 3.1562°W, SO211607		Medieval	RD154
	New Radnor: Interior of Medieval Town	House platform	New Radnor	52.2402°N 3.1575°W, SO210608		Medieval	RD152
	Radnor Castle	Motte & Bailey	New Radnor	52.2418°N 3.1564°W, SO211610		Medieval	RD033
	Town Bank and Ditch	Town defences	New Radnor	52.2405°N 3.1587°W, SO209608		Medieval	RD050
	Barland Motte and Bailey	Motte & Bailey	Old Radnor	52.25°N 3.0546°W, SO281618		Medieval	RD143
	Castle Nimble	Motte & Bailey	Old Radnor	52.228°N 3.1025°W, SO247594		Medieval	RD046
	Kinnerton Castle Mound	Motte	Old Radnor	52.2601°N 3.1075°W, SO245630		Medieval	RD045
	Knapp Farm Mound	Motte	Old Radnor	52.2328°N 3.1057°W, SO245599		Medieval	RD047
	Mound & Bailey Castle 360m ESE of St Peter's Church	Motte	Old Radnor	52.2561°N 3.0766°W, SO266625		Medieval	RD058
	Mound and Bailey Castle 495m NW of Ditch Hill Bridge	Motte	Old Radnor	52.2434°N 3.0622°W, SO275611		Medieval	RD057
	Old Radnor Castle	Moated Site	Old Radnor	52.2241°N 3.099°W, SO250590		Medieval	RD051
	Womaston Castle Mound	Motte	Old Radnor	52.2385°N 3.0742°W, SO267605		Medieval	RD118
	Castle Mound 400m N of Cefnige	Motte	Painscastle	52.0958°N 3.2779°W, SO125449		Medieval	RD071
	Lettypeod Deserted Rural Settlement	House platform	Painscastle	52.1309°N 3.2231°W, SO163487		Medieval	RD185
	Pain's Castle	Motte & Bailey	Painscastle	52.1074°N 3.2188°W, SO166461		Medieval	RD006
	Pentre Jack Settlement	Deserted Rural Settlement	Painscastle	52.0913°N 3.2529°W, SO142443		Medieval	RD174
	Red Hill Cross Ridge Dyke	Cross Ridge Dyke	Painscastle	52.1402°N 3.2431°W, SO150498		Medieval	RD183
	Bank House Medieval Settlement	Deserted Rural Settlement	Penybont	52.2353°N 3.342°W, SO084605		Medieval	RD159
	Cefnllys Castle	Motte & Bailey	Penybont	52.2438°N 3.3354°W, SO089614		Medieval	RD008
	Cefnllys Medieval Settlement and Field Systems	Field system	Penybont	52.2437°N 3.3414°W, SO085614		Medieval	RD150
	Medieval Settlement on Penybont Common	Deserted Rural Settlement	Penybont	52.2691°N 3.2808°W, SO126642		Medieval	RD157
	Old Castle Mound	Motte	Penybont	52.258°N 3.3317°W, SO092630		Medieval	RD077
	Norton Mound And Bailey Castle	Motte & Bailey	Presteigne	52.2994°N 3.0224°W, SO303672		Medieval	RD056
	The Warden Mound & Bailey Castle	Motte & Bailey	Presteigne	52.2744°N 3.0132°W, SO309645		Medieval	RD052
	Maen Serth, Esgair Dderw	Standing stone	Rhayader	52.3165°N 3.552°W, SN943698		Medieval	RD043
	Rhayader Castle	Castle	Rhayader	52.3007°N 3.5145°W, SN968680		Medieval	RD132
	Tomen Llansantffraid	Motte	Rhayader	52.2984°N 3.5153°W, SN967677		Medieval	RD142
	Beili-Bedw Earthworks	Deserted Rural Settlement	St Harmon	52.35°N 3.4746°W, SN996734		Medieval	RD129
	Cefn Bychan Mound (Pillow Mound)	Pillow mound	St Harmon	52.3178°N 3.5262°W, SN960699		Medieval	RD116
	Cwm Sidywal Settlements	Settlement	St Harmon	52.3483°N 3.5111°W, SN971733		Medieval	RD263
	Drysgol Platform	Platform house	St Harmon	52.353°N 3.5415°W, SN951738		Medieval	RD176
	Castell Foel-Allt	Motte & Bailey	Whitton	52.3022°N 3.0888°W, SO258676		Medieval	RD060
	Discoed Castle Mound	Motte	Whitton	52.2766°N 3.0615°W, SO276648		Medieval	RD059
	Twiscob Moated Site	Moated Site	Whitton	52.2831°N 3.1318°W, SO228656		Medieval	RD146
	Aberedw Hill Deserted Rural Settlement	Longhouse	Aberedw	52.1408°N 3.3419°W, SO082500		Post-Medieval/Modern	RD166
	Cwmblaenerw Enclosed Long Hut	Longhouse	Glascwm	52.1622°N 3.3054°W, SO108523		Post-Medieval/Modern	RD169
	Castle Bank Settlement	Deserted Rural Settlement	Llanbadarn Fynydd	52.3882°N 3.3623°W, SO073775		Post-Medieval/Modern	RD187
	Fron Top Deserted Rural Settlement	Platform house	Llanbister	52.4034°N 3.2971°W, SO118791		Post-Medieval/Modern	RD173
	Llanbedr Hill Platform House	Platform house	Painscastle	52.1235°N 3.2584°W, SO139479		Post-Medieval/Modern	RD181
	Cwm Elan Lead Mine	Lead mine	Rhayader	52.2731°N 3.6133°W, SN900651		Post-Medieval/Modern	RD153
	Llananno Royal Observer Corps Monitoring Post	Observation Post	Llanbadarn Fynydd	52.361°N 3.3276°W, SO096744		Post-Medieval/Modern	RD270
	Doldowlod Pillbox	Pillbox	Nantmel	52.2551°N 3.4937°W, SN981629		Post-Medieval/Modern	RD271
	Elan Valley Pillboxes	Pillbox	Rhayader	52.2644°N 3.5967°W, SN911641		Post-Medieval/Modern	RD266

== See also ==
- List of Cadw properties
- List of castles in Wales
- List of hill forts in Wales
- Historic houses in Wales
- List of monastic houses in Wales
- List of museums in Wales
- List of Roman villas in Wales
