= List of prehistoric scheduled monuments in Powys (Radnorshire) =

Powys is the largest administrative county in Wales. With over a quarter of Wales's land area, covering much of the eastern half of the country, it is a county of remote uplands, low population and no coastline. It was created in more or less its current form in 1974, and is the only one of the large county units created at that time to have been carried forward intact at the 1996 local government re-organisation. It comprises three historic counties, namely Montgomeryshire, Radnorshire, and most of Brecknockshire. There are 950 scheduled monuments within the county, which is far more than can be sensibly covered in one list. Each of the 3 historic counties is therefore listed separately, and each of these has two lists - one for the prehistoric sites and one for the Roman, medieval and post-medieval sites.

This list shows the prehistoric sites in Radnorshire, which occupies the central third of Powys. The River Wye separates it from Brecknockshire to the south, and Montgomeryshire forms the northern third of Powys. There are 139 prehistoric scheduled monuments in the Radnorshire area. Of these, only two are Neolithic burial sites whilst 117 are likely to date from the Bronze Age, mainly burial sites of various sorts but also including a cup-marked stone, 11 stone circles and stone alignments, and 17 standing stones. There are 20 Iron Age hillforts, defensive and other enclosures.

The lists of Scheduled Monuments in Powys are as follows:-

- List of Scheduled prehistoric Monuments in Powys (Brecknockshire) (254 sites)
- List of Scheduled Roman to modern Monuments in Powys (Brecknockshire) (135 sites)
- List of Scheduled prehistoric Monuments in Powys (Radnorshire) (139 sites - shown below)
- List of Scheduled Roman to modern Monuments in Powys (Radnorshire) (119 sites)
- List of Scheduled prehistoric Monuments in Powys (Montgomeryshire) (190 sites)
- List of Scheduled Roman to modern Monuments in Powys (Montgomeryshire) (113 sites)

Scheduled Ancient Monuments (SAMs) have statutory protection. It is illegal to disturb the ground surface or any standing remains. The compilation of the list is undertaken by Cadw Welsh Historic Monuments, which is an executive agency of the National Assembly of Wales. The list of scheduled monuments below is supplied by Cadw with additional material from RCAHMW and Clwyd-Powys Archaeological Trust.

== Scheduled prehistoric Monuments in Radnorshire ==
| Image | Name | Site type | Community | Location | Details | Period | SAM No & Refs |
|---|---|---|---|---|---|---|---|
| | Clyro Court chambered tomb | Chambered tomb | Clyro | 52.0811°N 3.1509°W, SO212431 | A long cairn (32m in length) with traces of a chamber. | Prehistoric (Neolithic) | RD203 |
| | Beddau Folau Chambered Tomb | Chambered tomb | Rhayader | 52.2815°N 3.5817°W, SN921659 | Well preserved Neolithic or Bronze Age tomb next to a public footpath. Four upright slabs remain, and two more lying down. Scheduled in 2003. Also written as Beddaufolau. | Prehistoric (Neolithic) | RD202 |
| | Castell y Garn | Round cairn | Abbey Cwmhir | 52.3515°N 3.4421°W, SO019735 | | Prehistoric | RD114 |
| | Domen-ddu round barrows | Round barrow | Abbey Cwmhir | 52.3936°N 3.4461°W, SO016782 | | Prehistoric | RD248 |
| | Fowler's Arm Chair Stone Circle & Round Cairns, Banc Du | Stone circle | Abbey Cwmhir | 52.4021°N 3.4102°W, SO041791 | | Prehistoric | RD039 |
| | Fuallt Standing Stone | Standing stone | Abbey Cwmhir | 52.4047°N 3.4347°W, SO024794 | | Prehistoric | RD193 |
| | Llyn Dwr Cairn | Cairn | Abbey Cwmhir | 52.3164°N 3.3999°W, SO046696 | | Prehistoric | RD161 |
| | Llyn Dwr Standing Stone | Standing stone | Abbey Cwmhir | 52.3163°N 3.3985°W, SO047696 | | Prehistoric | RD160 |
| | The Mount Round Barrow near Maes-y-Gwaelod | Round barrow | Abbey Cwmhir | 52.3685°N 3.4539°W, SO011754 | | Prehistoric | RD073 |
| | Aberedw Hill Round Barrows | Round barrow | Aberedw | 52.1374°N 3.3469°W, SO079496 | | Prehistoric | RD074 |
| | Cefn Wylfre Round Barrows | Round barrow | Aberedw | 52.1509°N 3.2498°W, SO145510 | | Prehistoric | RD178 |
| | Llanbedr Hill Cist Cairn | Round cairn | Aberedw | 52.1276°N 3.2616°W, SO137484 | | Prehistoric | RD182 |
| | Llwyn-y-wrach standing stone | Standing stone | Aberedw | 52.1338°N 3.3451°W, SO080492 | | Prehistoric | RD243 |
| | Banc Gorddwr, round barrow on NW side of | Round barrow | Beguildy | 52.4448°N 3.3097°W, SO110837 | | Prehistoric | RD250 |
| | Banc Gorddwr, round barrow on S side of | Round barrow | Beguildy | 52.4377°N 3.3079°W, SO111830 | | Prehistoric | RD251 |
| | Beacon Hill Round Barrows | Round barrow | Beguildy | 52.3829°N 3.2114°W, SO176767 | | Prehistoric | RD111 |
| | Round Barrow Near Pennant Pound | Round barrow | Beguildy | 52.3857°N 3.1437°W, SO222770 | | Prehistoric | RD090 |
| | Round Barrow S of Meagram's Corner | Round barrow | Beguildy | 52.3968°N 3.1627°W, SO209782 | | Prehistoric | RD088 |
| | Three Round Barrows NW of Fiddler's Green Farm | Round barrow | Beguildy | 52.4305°N 3.3062°W, SO112821 | | Prehistoric | RD084 |
| | Warren Hill Round Barrow | Round barrow | Beguildy | 52.3914°N 3.2596°W, SO143777 | | Prehistoric | RD105 |
| | Llwyn-Ceubren Round Barrow | Round barrow | Disserth and Trecoed | 52.2213°N 3.3773°W, SO060590 | | Prehistoric | RD127 |
| | Two Cooking Mounds 350m W of Llwynceubren, Howey | Burnt mound | Disserth and Trecoed | 52.2218°N 3.3764°W, SO060590 | | Prehistoric | RD141 |
| | Gilwern Brook round barrow | Round barrow | Gladestry | 52.1974°N 3.1938°W, SO185561 | | Prehistoric | RD242 |
| | Llanfihangel Hill round barrow | Round barrow | Gladestry | 52.1926°N 3.1867°W, SO189555 | | Prehistoric | RD241 |
| | Maesgwyn round barrow | Round barrow | Glasbury | 52.084°N 3.2218°W, SO163435 | | Prehistoric | RD246 |
| | Neuadd-Glan-Gwy Standing Stone | Standing stone | Glasbury | 52.062°N 3.2757°W, SO126411 | | Prehistoric | RD128 |
| | Bryntwppa stone row | Stone row | Glascwm | 52.1781°N 3.3323°W, SO089541 | | Prehistoric | RD236 |
| | Carneddau round cairns | Round cairn | Glascwm | 52.1811°N 3.3718°W, SO063545 | | Prehistoric | RD235 |
| | Carneddau, cairn on N end of | Round cairn | Glascwm | 52.1877°N 3.3661°W, SO067552 | | Prehistoric | RD221 |
| | Carneddau, round cairn on N end of | Round cairn | Glascwm | 52.1893°N 3.367°W, SO066554 | | Prehistoric | RD220 |
| | Castle Bank ring cairn | Ring cairn | Glascwm | 52.1885°N 3.3408°W, SO084553 | | Prehistoric | RD228 |
| | Cefn Wylfre Stone Circle and Round Barrow | Stone circle | Glascwm | 52.1511°N 3.2583°W, SO140510 | | Prehistoric | RD177 |
| | Cilberllan ring cairn | Ring cairn | Glascwm | 52.1806°N 3.3455°W, SO081544 | | Prehistoric | RD226 |
| | Court standing stone | Standing stone | Glascwm | 52.2021°N 3.3406°W, SO084568 | | Prehistoric | RD225 |
| | Court stone row | Stone row | Glascwm | 52.2031°N 3.3349°W, SO088569 | | Prehistoric | RD224 |
| | Cwm standing stone | Standing stone | Glascwm | 52.1977°N 3.3156°W, SO101563 | | Prehistoric | RD229 |
| | Cwm-berwyn round cairn | Round cairn | Glascwm | 52.1793°N 3.3519°W, SO076543 | | Prehistoric | RD222 |
| | Cwm-Maerdy Standing Stone | Standing stone | Glascwm | 52.2207°N 3.2574°W, SO142587 | | Prehistoric | RD113 |
| | Gelli Hill Round Barrow | Round barrow | Glascwm | 52.2154°N 3.3203°W, SO098582 | | Prehistoric | RD034 |
| | Gelli Hill Stone Circle | Stone circle | Glascwm | 52.2163°N 3.3252°W, SO095583 | | Prehistoric | RD028 |
| | Giant's Grave round cairn | Round cairn | Glascwm | 52.181°N 3.2589°W, SO140543 | | Prehistoric | RD218 |
| | Gilwern Hill round cairn | Round cairn | Glascwm | 52.2191°N 3.329°W, SO093587 | | Prehistoric | RD239 |
| | Gilwern Hill, Round Cairn on NE of | Round cairn | Glascwm | 52.2227°N 3.3211°W, SO098590 | | Prehistoric | RD240 |
| | Gwernfach round cairn | Round cairn | Glascwm | 52.2021°N 3.3229°W, SO096568 | | Prehistoric | RD227 |
| | Hundred House round barrow | Round barrow | Glascwm | 52.1798°N 3.2985°W, SO113543 | | Prehistoric | RD230 |
| | Six Stones Stone Circle | Stone circle | Glascwm | 52.157°N 3.2251°W, SO162516 | | Prehistoric | RD026 |
| | The Fedw Stone Circle 360m W of Llanboidy Wood | Stone circle | Glascwm | 52.2132°N 3.2554°W, SO143579 | | Prehistoric | RD027 |
| | Upper House round cairns | Round cairn | Glascwm | 52.2036°N 3.3491°W, SO079570 | | Prehistoric | RD223 |
| | Coventry Round Barrow | Round barrow | Llanbadarn Fynydd | 52.4052°N 3.2805°W, SO129793 | | Prehistoric | RD103 |
| | Moel Dod round barrow | Round barrow | Llanbadarn Fynydd | 52.3794°N 3.3565°W, SO077765 | | Prehistoric | RD249 |
| | Cae-glas Round Barrows | Round barrow | Llanbister | 52.3935°N 3.2662°W, SO138780 | | Prehistoric | RD104 |
| | Gors Lydan Round Barrows | Round barrow | Llanbister | 52.3828°N 3.2853°W, SO126768 | | Prehistoric | RD106 |
| | Rhos Crug Round Barrows | Round barrow | Llanbister | 52.3612°N 3.2245°W, SO167743 | | Prehistoric | RD110 |
| | Round Barrow to W of Ty'n-y-ddol Hill | Round barrow | Llanbister | 52.4028°N 3.2771°W, SO132790 | | Prehistoric | RD252 |
| | Bongam Bank Round Barrows | Round barrow | Llandrindod Wells | 52.2417°N 3.3518°W, SO077612 | | Prehistoric | RD007 |
| | Broomy Hill standing stone | Standing stone | Llandrindod Wells | 52.2262°N 3.3606°W, SO071595 | | Prehistoric | RD232 |
| | Broomy Hill, standing stone on N | Standing stone | Llandrindod Wells | 52.2293°N 3.3595°W, SO072598 | | Prehistoric | RD233 |
| | Broomy Hill, standing stone on S | Standing stone | Llandrindod Wells | 52.2225°N 3.3643°W, SO069591 | | Prehistoric | RD231 |
| | Little Hill Round Barrows | Round barrow | Llandrindod Wells | 52.227°N 3.358°W, SO073596 | | Prehistoric | RD009 |
| | Pant Purlas Round Barrow | Round barrow | Llandrindod Wells | 52.2389°N 3.3557°W, SO075609 | | Prehistoric | RD010 |
| | Carneddau Round Cairn | Round cairn | Llanelwedd | 52.177°N 3.367°W, SO066540 | | Prehistoric | RD122 |
| | Carneddau, standing stone to SSW of | Standing stone | Llanelwedd | 52.1713°N 3.3744°W, SO061534 | | Prehistoric | RD219 |
| | Black Mixen, round barrow to NW of | Round barrow | Llanfihangel Rhydithon | 52.279°N 3.1873°W, SO190652 | | Prehistoric | RD256 |
| | Cwm Bwch round barrow pair | Round barrow | Llanfihangel Rhydithon | 52.2766°N 3.2095°W, SO175649 | | Prehistoric | RD255 |
| | Great Rhos Round Barrow | Round barrow | Llanfihangel Rhydithon | 52.2693°N 3.2094°W, SO175641 | | Prehistoric | RD254 |
| | Shepherd's Tump Round Barrow | Round barrow | Llanfihangel Rhydithon | 52.2802°N 3.2399°W, SO155653 | | Prehistoric | RD253 |
| | Dol-y-Fan Round Cairn | Round cairn | Llanyre | 52.2416°N 3.4375°W, SO019613 | | Prehistoric | RD125 |
| | Carn Wen cairn | Kerb cairn | Nantmel | 52.2841°N 3.4867°W, SN986661 | | Prehistoric | RD205 |
| | Round Barrow NE of Cefn-Ceido Hall | Round barrow | Nantmel | 52.3046°N 3.4902°W, SN984684 | | Prehistoric | RD083 |
| | Ty-Lettice Round Barrow | Round barrow | Nantmel | 52.3068°N 3.4824°W, SN990686 | | Prehistoric | RD082 |
| | Black Mixen Round Barrow | Round barrow | New Radnor | 52.2718°N 3.179°W, SO196643 | | Prehistoric | RD257 |
| | Bryn y Maen Alignment (Four Stones) | Stone alignment | New Radnor | 52.2031°N 3.236°W, SO156568 | | Prehistoric | RD069 |
| | Bryn y Maen Round Barrow | Round barrow | New Radnor | 52.2035°N 3.2354°W, SO156565 | | Prehistoric | RD109 |
| | Llannerch cup-marked rock | Cup-marked stone | New Radnor | 52.2189°N 3.2347°W, SO157585 | | Prehistoric | RD234 |
| | The Whimble Barrow | Round barrow | New Radnor | 52.2562°N 3.1659°W, SO205626 | | Prehistoric | RD191 |
| | Bronze Age Round Barrows on Whinyard Rocks | Round barrow | Old Radnor | 52.261°N 3.1612°W, SO208631 | | Prehistoric | RD190 |
| | Hindwell Farm Round Barrows | Round barrow | Old Radnor | 52.2414°N 3.0965°W, SO252609 | | Prehistoric | RD063 |
| | Red Hill Bronze Age Barrows | Round barrow | Old Radnor | 52.2653°N 3.1533°W, SO214636 | | Prehistoric | RD189 |
| | Standing Stone 400m ENE of Four Stones | Standing stone | Old Radnor | 52.2414°N 3.1011°W, SO249609 | | Prehistoric | RD064 |
| | Four Stones | Standing stone | Old Radnor | 52.2402°N 3.1059°W, SO245607 | Four regularly spaced stones set as corners of a rectangle (or 'four-poster stone circle'). The name 'Four Stones' has been in use at least since the 17th century. | Prehistoric | RD004 |
| | Two Round Barrows NE of Harpton Court | Round barrow | Old Radnor | 52.2334°N 3.1157°W, SO238600 | | Prehistoric | RD048 |
| | Worsell Wood cairn cemetery | Round cairn | Old Radnor | 52.2134°N 3.087°W, SO258577 | | Prehistoric | RD151 |
| | Bailey Bedw Ring Cairn | Ring cairn | Painscastle | 52.0897°N 3.2202°W, SO164441 | | Prehistoric | RD180 |
| | Begwns round cairn | Round cairn | Painscastle | 52.0951°N 3.2368°W, SO153448 | | Prehistoric | RD245 |
| | Begwns standing stone | Standing stone | Painscastle | 52.0967°N 3.2389°W, SO152449 | | Prehistoric | RD244 |
| | Blaenhenllan round cairn | Round cairn | Painscastle | 52.1017°N 3.31°W, SO103456 | | Prehistoric | RD217 |
| | Lane Farm Round Barrow | Round barrow | Painscastle | 52.1177°N 3.198°W, SO180472 | | Prehistoric | RD144 |
| | Twyn y Garth Round Barrows | Round barrow | Painscastle | 52.0848°N 3.3035°W, SO107437 | | Prehistoric | RD065 |
| | Cwmbrith Round Cairn | Round cairn | Penybont | 52.2352°N 3.3386°W, SO086605 | | Prehistoric | RD156 |
| | Ffrwd standing stone | Standing stone | Penybont | 52.23°N 3.3331°W, SO090599 | | Prehistoric | RD238 |
| | Pawl Hir Ring Cairn | Ring cairn | Penybont | 52.2268°N 3.3175°W, SO101595 | | Prehistoric | RD167 |
| | Carn Nant-y-ffald cairn | Round cairn | Rhayader | 52.3528°N 3.6158°W, SN900739 | | Prehistoric | RD207 |
| | Carn Wen cairn | Platform Cairn | Rhayader | 52.3516°N 3.6123°W, SN902738 | | Prehistoric | RD206 |
| | Carn y Groes cairn | Round cairn | Rhayader | 52.3747°N 3.6456°W, SN880764 | | Prehistoric | RD208 |
| | Carreg Bica Round Cairn | Round cairn | Rhayader | 52.2772°N 3.5773°W, SN924655 | | Prehistoric | RD200 |
| | Cefn Llanerchi Standing Stones | Stone alignment | Rhayader | 52.2587°N 3.6154°W, SN898635 | | Prehistoric | RD198 |
| | Cefn Troedrhiw-drain cist | Cist burial | Rhayader | 52.2869°N 3.6315°W, SN888666 | | Prehistoric | RD214 |
| | Cistfaen barrows | Round barrow | Rhayader | 52.378°N 3.67°W, SN864768 | | Prehistoric | RD210 |
| | Cistfaen cairns | Round cairn | Rhayader | 52.3793°N 3.6708°W, SN863770 | | Prehistoric | RD209 |
| | Clap yr Arian cairn | Round cairn | Rhayader | 52.3173°N 3.5619°W, SN936699 | | Prehistoric | RD212 |
| | Esgair Beddau cairns | Round cairn | Rhayader | 52.3071°N 3.6659°W, SN865689 | | Prehistoric | RD216 |
| | Glog Fawr Platform Cairn | Platform Cairn | Rhayader | 52.2818°N 3.5778°W, SN924660 | | Prehistoric | RD201 |
| | Nant Cletwr barrow | Round barrow | Rhayader | 52.3055°N 3.6565°W, SN871687 | | Prehistoric | RD215 |
| | Nant Gwynllyn Standing stone | Standing stone | Rhayader | 52.3153°N 3.568°W, SN932697 | | Prehistoric | RD196 |
| | Nant y Llyn cist | Cist burial | Rhayader | 52.3082°N 3.5691°W, SN931689 | | Prehistoric | RD211 |
| | Nant y Llyn Stone Row | Stone alignment | Rhayader | 52.3079°N 3.5691°W, SN931689 | | Prehistoric | RD197 |
| | Rhos y Gelynnen Ring Cairn | Ring cairn | Rhayader | 52.2547°N 3.6039°W, SN906630 | | Prehistoric | RD194 |
| | Rhos y Gelynnen Stone Row | Stone row | Rhayader | 52.2549°N 3.605°W, SN905630 | | Prehistoric | RD195 |
| | Y Glog Fawr cairn | Round cairn | Rhayader | 52.2832°N 3.5828°W, SN921661 | | Prehistoric | RD213 |
| | Bronze Age round barrow NW of Glan-marteg | Round barrow | St Harmon | 52.3551°N 3.4805°W, SN992740 | | Prehistoric | RD042 |
| | Bronze Age tumulus north of Beili Haulwen | Round barrow | St Harmon | 52.3599°N 3.4763°W, SN995745 | | Prehistoric | RD192 |
| | Cnych Round Barrow | Round barrow | St Harmon | 52.3687°N 3.4799°W, SN993755 | | Prehistoric | RD115 |
| | Creggin Round Barrow | Round barrow | St Harmon | 52.3259°N 3.4983°W, SN979708 | | Prehistoric | RD078 |
| | Crugyn Tumulus | Round barrow | St Harmon | 52.3397°N 3.4948°W, SN982723 | | Prehistoric | RD040 |
| | Cwm y Saeson Standing Stone | Standing stone | St Harmon | 52.3808°N 3.5429°W, SN950769 | | Prehistoric | RD119 |
| | Pont Marteg, cairn circle to E of | Cairn circle | St Harmon | 52.3323°N 3.5282°W, SN959715 | | Prehistoric | RD204 |
| | Round Barrow 400m NNW of Beili Hwlyn | Round barrow | St Harmon | 52.3544°N 3.4839°W, SN990739 | | Prehistoric | RD041 |
| | Standing Stone & Round Barrow SE of Henriw | Round barrow | St Harmon | 52.3862°N 3.5234°W, SN964775 | | Prehistoric | RD070 |
| | Llethrau Camp | Enclosure | Beguildy | 52.441°N 3.2641°W, SO141833 | | Prehistoric | RD107 |
| | Tyn'n-y-Cwm Camp | Enclosure | Beguildy | 52.4426°N 3.247°W, SO153834 | | Prehistoric | RD120 |
| | Castle Bank Hillfort | Hillfort | Glascwm | 52.1954°N 3.3373°W, SO086560 | | Prehistoric | RD149 |
| | Cwm Berwyn Camp | Hillfort | Glascwm | 52.1841°N 3.3578°W, SO072548 | | Prehistoric | RD123 |
| | Graig Camp | Hillfort | Glascwm | 52.2171°N 3.2729°W, SO131584 | | Prehistoric | RD112 |
| | The Gaer hillfort | Hillfort | Glascwm | 52.1841°N 3.3392°W, SO085548 | | Prehistoric | RD237 |
| | Wern Camp | Hillfort | Glascwm | 52.1745°N 3.2259°W, SO162536 | | Prehistoric | RD130 |
| Castell Tinboeth | Castell Tinboeth | Hillfort | Llanbadarn Fynydd | 52.3694°N 3.3371°W, SO090754 | | Prehistoric | RD038 |
| | Castell y Blaidd | Enclosure | Llanbadarn Fynydd | 52.4092°N 3.2881°W, SO124797 | | Prehistoric | RD102 |
| | Camp SW of Castell Cwm Aran | Hillfort | Llanddewi Ystradenny | 52.3223°N 3.2542°W, SO146700 | | Prehistoric | RD094 |
| | Camp W of Cwm Cefn y Gaer | Hillfort | Llanddewi Ystradenny | 52.3193°N 3.3004°W, SO114698 | | Prehistoric | RD093 |
| | Cwm Cefn y Gaer | Hillfort | Llanddewi Ystradenny | 52.3206°N 3.2905°W, SO121699 | | Prehistoric | RD011 |
| | Carreg-Wiber Bank Earthwork | Earthwork (unclassified) | Llandrindod Wells | 52.2261°N 3.3425°W, SO084595 | | Prehistoric | RD031 |
| | Caer Einon Camp | Hillfort | Llanelwedd | 52.1677°N 3.3703°W, SO063530 | | Prehistoric | RD014 |
| | Glog Camp | Enclosure | Llangunllo | 52.3132°N 3.1272°W, SO232689 | | Prehistoric | RD098 |
| | Water-Break-its-Neck Promontory Fort | Promontory fort - inland | Llangunllo | 52.354°N 3.2016°W, SO182735 | | Prehistoric | RD265 |
| Burfa Camp hillfort | Burfa Camp | Hillfort | Old Radnor | 52.2429°N 3.0499°W, SO284610 | | Prehistoric | RD013 |
| | Castle Ring | Enclosure | Old Radnor | 52.2657°N 3.0762°W, SO266636 | | Prehistoric | RD062 |
| | Hindwell Palisaded Enclosure | Palisaded Enclosure | Old Radnor | 52.2395°N 3.0935°W, SO254607 | | Prehistoric | RD247 |
| | Coed-swydd Enclosure | Enclosure - Defensive | Penybont | 52.2734°N 3.2665°W, SO136646 | | Prehistoric | RD262 |
| | Llandegley Rocks Hillfort | Hillfort | Penybont | 52.2482°N 3.2685°W, SO135619 | | Prehistoric | RD264 |

Scheduled Monuments in Powys, Wales.
=Neolithic =Bronze Age =Iron Age

== See also ==
- List of Cadw properties
- List of castles in Wales
- List of hill forts in Wales
- Historic houses in Wales
- List of monastic houses in Wales
- List of museums in Wales
- List of Roman villas in Wales
