= Elfael =

Welsh medieval cantref

Map of Rhwng Gwy a Hafren

Elfael was one of a number of Welsh cantrefi occupying the region between the River Wye and river Severn, known as Rhwng Gwy a Hafren, in the early Middle Ages. It was divided into two commotes, Is Mynydd and Uwch Mynydd, separated by the chain of hills above Aberedw. In the late medieval period, it was a marcher lordship. However, after the Laws in Wales Act 1535, it was one of the territorial units which went to make up the county of Radnorshire in 1536 (the others were Gwrtheyrnion, Maelienydd and Llythyfnwg, the latter being known in English as the lordship of Radnor).

== Ferlix ==
=== Early history ===
According to historic manuscripts, the region between Wye and Severn was once regarded as a unit. Manuscripts use various alternative spellings for this, such as Ferlix, Fferllys, Fferleg, and Fferreg; in his Hanes Cymru, the historian John Davies argued, based on these alternatives, that it was probably named Fferyllwg, and that the name may refer to ironworkers (Fferyll in Welsh).

Welsh tradition (as reported for example by the 1844 Topographical Dictionary of Wales), claims that Ferlix was part of the realm of King Caradoc (more usually associated with Gwent), but on his death, the realm was divided between his sons; Cawdraf received Ferlix, while Meurig, received the rest of the realm, as Gwent. In any case, manuscripts give Tangwydd ap Tegid, an 8th-century ruler of Ferlix, the following pedigree:

- Cawrdaf ap Caradoc
- Caw ap Cawrdaf
- Gloyw ap Caw
- Hoyw ap Gloyw
- Cynfarch ap Hoyw
- Cyndegg ap Cynfarch
- Teithwalch ap Cyndegg
- Tegid ap Teithwalch
- Tangwydd ap Tegid

Welsh annals claim that during the reign of Tangwydd's father, Tegid, the Mercians seized parts of Ferlix, by constructing Offa's Dyke through it. For unclear reasons, Tangwydd also became ruler of Brycheiniog, which lay adjacent to Ferlix; Elisse ap Rhain, the previous king of Brycheiniog, only had daughters, so it is possible that Tangwydd obtained Brycheiniog by marriage.

Hwgan, Tangwydd's son and successor, attempted to invade Mercia, while King Edward the Elder was distracted by the Viking invasion; Hwgan, however, hadn't reckoned with Edward's sister, Æthelflæd, who lead an army against him. Æthelflæd defeated Hwgan, in battle, then invaded his lands, captured Hwgan's castle (in Brycheiniog). and took his wife prisoner. Hwgan decided to form an alliance with the Vikings, but died soon after. Hwgan's son, Dryffin succeeded him, but Elystan Glodrydd, god-son (and namesake) of King Athelstan, conquered Ferlix; Dryffin and his heirs would now only rule Brycheiniog.

Elystan added Ferlix to his existing realm of Buellt. He was succeeded by his son, Cadwgan, who was succeeded by his eldest son, Idnerth; a younger son gave rise to the Cadogan family, who were raised to the nobility many centuries later.

=== Emergence of Norman magnates ===
Due to their allegiances to the Saxon Kings, once the Normans invaded England, many Welsh princes had assisted anti-Norman revolts like that of Eadric the Wild. Hence, in 1080, when a revolt broke out in Northern England, the Normans pre-emptively occupied Wales, to prevent any further Welsh assistance to the Saxons. In turn, this led to a Welsh revolt in 1094, but by the end of the century it was successfully suppressed by a number of Norman magnates; most Welsh princes then came (individually) to an agreement with the Normans, and were restored to their lands.

Philip de Braose had conquered the region between Wye and Severn, and although most of Ferlix was returned to Idnerth, Braose kept Buellt and a small region around New Radnor for himself. Braose built Castles in these lands, ensuring that any further revolt would be difficult. This established a Marcher Lordship, outside of either English or Welsh law. Phillip held the Lordship for the rest of his life, and it was inherited by his son.

Idnerth's remaining lands were inherited by his son, Madog. In 1130, for unclear reasons, the Sheriff of Hereford, Pain fitzJohn, built the eponymous Painscastle Castle in southern Ferlix, not far from the Herefordshire border. In 1135, Painscastle was acquired by Madog; Pain was an opponent of Empress Matilda, the legitimate heir of King Henry, Henry had just died, and Pain may have been seeking an allegiance.

== Independence ==
Madog died in 1140, and the realm was divided between his sons. In 1142, when the opposition to Matilda lead to the Anarchy, Hugh de Mortimer invaded northern Ferlix. killing Hywel and Cadwgan, sons of Madog, in the process. In 1146 he moved further south, and in the process of capturing Pain's Castle, killed Maredudd, another of Madog's sons. In 1155, Matilda's son, Henry became King, and was able to force Hugh to surrender his Welsh castles.

The two remaining sons of Madog re-divided Ferlix between them; Einion Clud received the southern half (including Radnor), which became Elfael, while his brother Cadwallon ruled the northern half, which became Maeliennydd. Nevertheless, the brothers were hostile to one another, coveting each other's lands. In 1160 Cadwallon invaded Elfael, captured Einion Clud, and sent him as a prisoner to King Henry; Einion Clud escaped (or was released), and re-took his lands. However, when Hugh de Mortimer died, his son Roger arranged for Einion Clud to be ambushed, and killed. In 1179 he killed Cadwallon as well.

By now, New Radnor had been inherited by the patrilineal grandson of Philip de Braose, William de Braose. When William's other grandfather, Henry FitzMiles, was murdered, he undertook a notorious act of revenge - inviting the alleged murderer and other Welsh dignitaries to Abergavenny Castle for reconciliation, he had them all killed in the hall. This set off anti-Norman attacks on a number of local castles, including New Radnor, which was captured by Einion o'r Porth, the son of Einion Clud who had now succeeded him.

Einion o'r Porth married a daughter of Rhys ap Gruffydd, prince of Deheubarth, and evidently invited Rhys to Radnor Castle. In early March 1188, during their tour of Wales, Gerald of Wales visited Ferlix with Baldwin, the Archbishop of Canterbury, seeking soldiers for the Third Crusade; they met Einion at Radnor Castle, and convinced him to take the cross (i.e. join the crusade), like his cousin Maelgwn (ruler of Maelienydd) did afterwards at his castle of Crug Eryr (described by Gerald as 'Cruker'). Eineon rising up, said to Rhys, whose daughter he had married, "My father and lord! with your permission I hasten to revenge the injury offered to the great father of all."

Upon his return from the crusade, Einion o'r Porth was murdered by his own brother, Gwalter, who then seized power in Elfael. William de Braose subsequently conquered Elfael, deposing Gwalter, and recapturing New Radnor and Painscastle. In 1196, Prince Rhys, grandfather of Anarawd, Einion's son and heir, attempted to re-capture Painscastle, but failed. When Rhys died soon after, Rhys had been the most powerful Welsh prince, and now Gwenwynwyn, the prince of Powys Wenwynwyn, sought to become the most dominant; in 1198 he attacked Painscastle. The castle was defended by William's wife Maud (Matilda) of St-Valery until it was relieved by Geoffrey fitz Peter. On 12 August 1198 Anarawd became one of the thousands of Welsh soldiers killed in the fighting

Anarawd left a son, Llywelyn ab Anarawd, who was recorded as granting some of his remaining lands in Elfael to the Abbey of Cwm Hir, which had been founded by his family. Llywelyn's daughter Annes married her cousin Adda ap Madog, a patrilineal descendant of Maelgwn (of Maelienydd), via his son Maredudd; Adda would eventually be the last of his family to own any part of Ferlix - in his case, Ceri.

Meanwhile, in the anti-monarchial events leading up to Magna Carta, William's and Maud's son, Reginald de Braose formed an alliance with Llywelyn Fawr, the prince of Gwynedd; consequently, in 1215, he returned Elfael to Iorwerth Clud, another of Gwalter's brothers. Iorwerth died soon after, and Gwalter seized Elfael. When Gwalter died in about 1222, he was succeeded by his nephew, Owain ap Maredudd.

== Marcher Lordship ==
Following the repudiation of the Treaty of Gwerneigron by the Gwyneddian prince, Dafydd ap Llywelyn, Elfael appears to have been caught up in the conflict, as Elfael Is Mynydd came to be occupied by various Norman families soon after. In 1231, Painscastle was captured by Ralph de Tosny, and rebuilt in stone. Although this was officially settled by the Treaty of Woodstock, King Henry's authority over his barons was in the process of gradual collapse, and the settlement could not be enforced immediately. In 1264, Painscastle was captured by the forces of Llywelyn's grandson, Llywelyn ap Gruffudd, who now ruled Gwynedd, and in 1267 a formal complaint was sent to king Henry about the continued de Clare occupation of Elfael Is Mynydd.

In 1275, Llywelyn married Eleanor de Montfort, the daughter of Henry's greatest enemy. The new King, Henry's son Edward, consequently declared Llywelyn a rebel, and in 1277 attacked Gwynedd with an enormous army. Llywelyn was forced to agree to the Treaty of Aberconwy, limiting his authority to Gwynedd alone. The Marcher Lordship of Radnor was given to Llywelyn's cousin William de Braose, son of John de Braose and Marged, the daughter of Llywelyn Fawr. Roger de Tosny's son, Ralph, was given the rest of Elfael, including Painscastle, as a distinct Marcher Lordship.

Painscastle descended in the Tosny family, until it was inherited by Alice de Tosny, in 1309. Alice married Guy de Beauchamp, 10th Earl of Warwick, and the Marcher Lordship of Painscastle was passed to the Earls of Warwick, down to Edward Plantagenet, 17th Earl of Warwick, who died in 1499 without heirs, the inheritance passing to the Crown. Maelienydd had passed to the Mortimer Barons of Wigmore and later Earls of March, who were inherited by the House of York and subsequently the Crown. Ferlix was thus reunited when these lands were inherited by Henry VIII; following his Laws in Wales Acts, it became the main part of Radnorshire.

== Castles ==
The main castles in Elfael were:

- Painscastle
- Aberedw Castle
