= Llanfihangel Nant Melan =

Village in Powys, Wales

Coordinates: 52.2155°N 3.2013°W

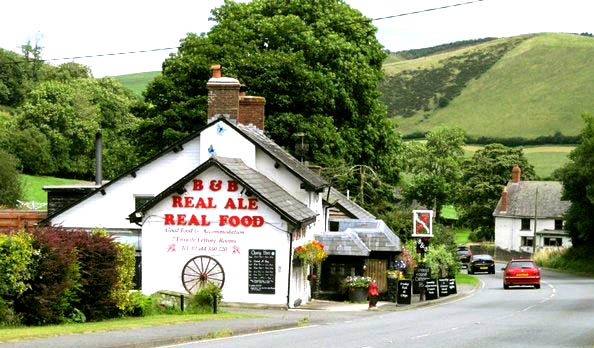
The Red Lion Inn

Llanfihangel Nant Melan is a small village in Powys, Wales, in the ancient county of Radnorshire. It is around 7 miles (11 km) from the English border. It is in the community of New Radnor. Until 1983 Llanfihangel Nant Melan was a community itself.

The village lies in a valley on the A44 road on the edge of the Radnor Forest, and is home to a church and two pubs. The A481 road from Builth joins the A44 near here.

== Buildings ==
=== St Michael's Church ===
St Michael's Church is medieval in origin, but was totally rebuilt in 1846 in Norman revival style by Thomas Nicholson of Hereford. The design is said to have been based on Kilpeck Church in Herefordshire.

=== Crug Eryr Castle ===
Above the village, and adjacent to the A44, can be found Crug Eryr Castle, a motte-and-bailey structure noted for its association with the visit in 1188 of Baldwin, the Archbishop of Canterbury, and Gerald of Wales.
