= Morgraig Castle =

Ruined castle in Caerphilly, Wales

Morgraig Castle Castell Morgraig
- Caerphilly, Wales
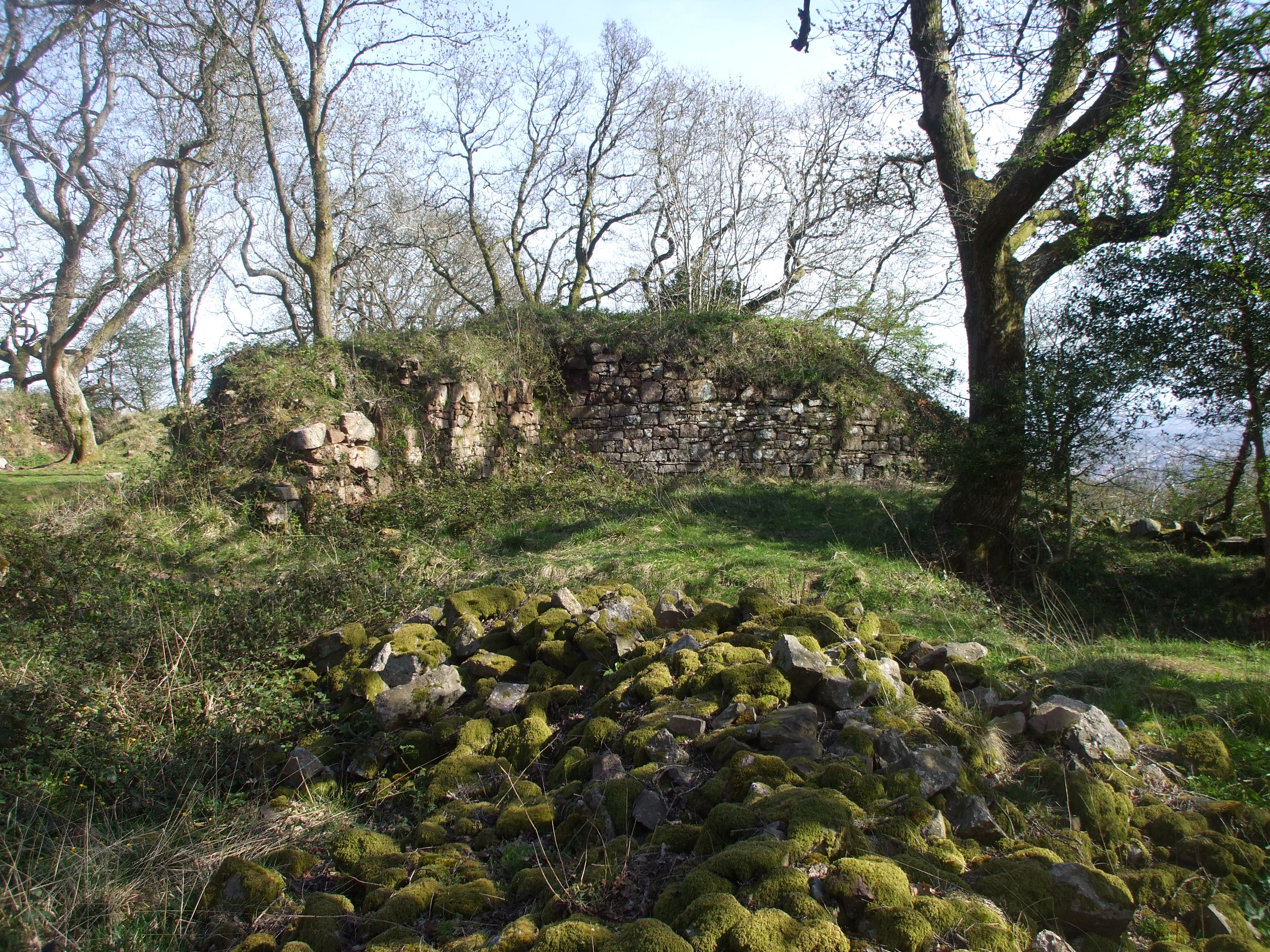
- The ruins of Morgraig Castle and its location below

Site information
- Open to the public: Yes
- Condition: Ruin

Location
- Coordinates: 51.551856°N 3.212474°W
- Height: Not known

Site history
- Built: 13th century
- In use: No
- Materials: dressed stone
- Demolished: Yes, date unknown

Scheduled monument
- Official name: Castell Morgraig
- Designated: 28 April 1928; 98 years ago
- Reference no.: GM031

Listed Building – Grade II
- Official name: Castell Morgraig
- Designated: 28 January 1963; 63 years ago
- Reference no.: 13540

Morgraig Castle (Welsh: Castell Morgraig) is a ruined castle, which lies close to the southern borders of the county borough of Caerphilly, overlooking Cardiff in Wales. It was built in the 13th century, but there is some debate as to who actually built the castle, either Gilbert de Clare or the Lord of Senghennydd. The castle appears to have never been occupied or completed. It is now a scheduled monument and a Grade II listed building.

== Archaeological investigations and interpretations ==
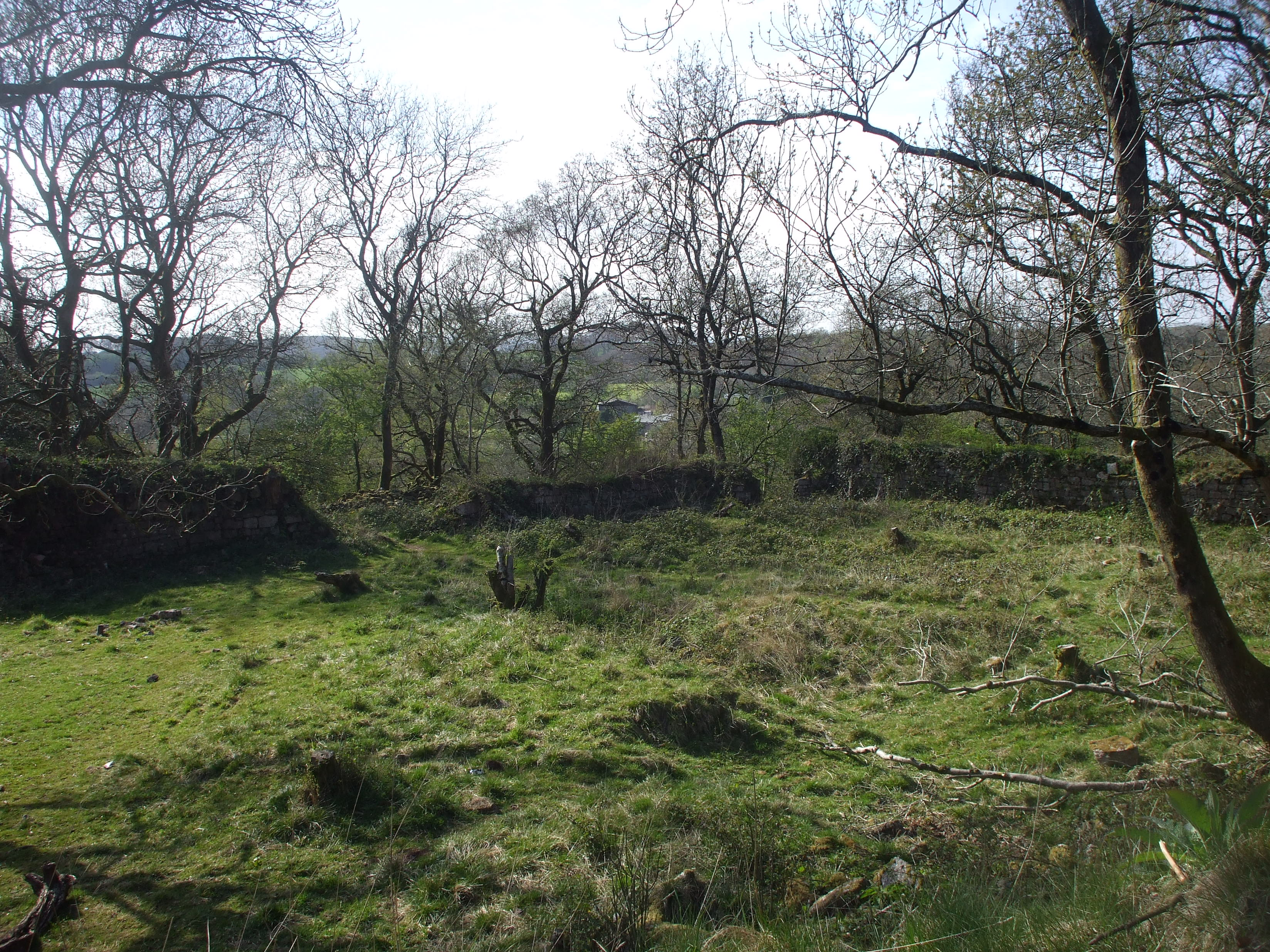
The interior of Morgraig Castle

Morgraig Castle is located in Caerphilly, on the escarpment of Craig Llanishen, close to the border between the counties of Caerphilly and Cardiff. It was built after 1243, but before 1267.

The castle was first discovered by a group of archaeologists from the Cardiff Museum led by John Ward in the summer of 1895. Ward was aware of stories telling of an ancient British fort and was interested in the particular site because he had seen maps that showed an unusual rectangular shape. Ward oversaw excavations on the site beginning in summer 1903 with excavation financed by Lord Windsor. Ward along with architect J.W. Rodger and historian J.S. Corbett suggested that the castle was built in the 13th century.

Since its discovery, there has been debate about the ruins. In 1997, newspaper articles appeared claiming that the castle was the location where a Welsh rebellion against English rule was defeated in 1315. In 1997–98, Cadw, the historic environment service of the Welsh Government, and the Royal Commission on the Ancient and Historical Monuments of Wales undertook the first major study of the site. Amateur historian Jack Spurgeon believes that the builder of Morgraig was an Anglo-Norman lord. He notes that it has some features that suggest it was of Welsh construction, but that inference is contradicted by the absence of ditches, which he considered indicative of North Welsh design at the time.

In the 13th century the castle would have stood on the border between the Welsh Lordship of Senghenydd and the English Lordship of Glamorgan. The lack of evidence of roofing materials or internal buildings at the site is interpreted to mean that the castle was never completed or occupied. The battlements found by Ward have now disappeared, but the shape of the walls of towers and the presence of a newel post indicate a spiral staircase rising from the first floor. This would have been unusual in a Welsh castle. In addition, carved stones for doorways and windows suggest an English castle. Cadw argue that the castle must have been built by the English because of two factors related to a type of stone used in its construction, known as Sutton stone. Sutton stone was obtained from only one quarry that was depleted in the Middle Ages. According to Cadw, the castle could only have been built during the period that the quarry was in use. They also argue that only the English could have obtained the stone because the site of the quarry near Ogmore-by-Sea would have been defended by the de Clare family, at nearby Ogmore Castle, who opposed the Lord of Senghennydd.

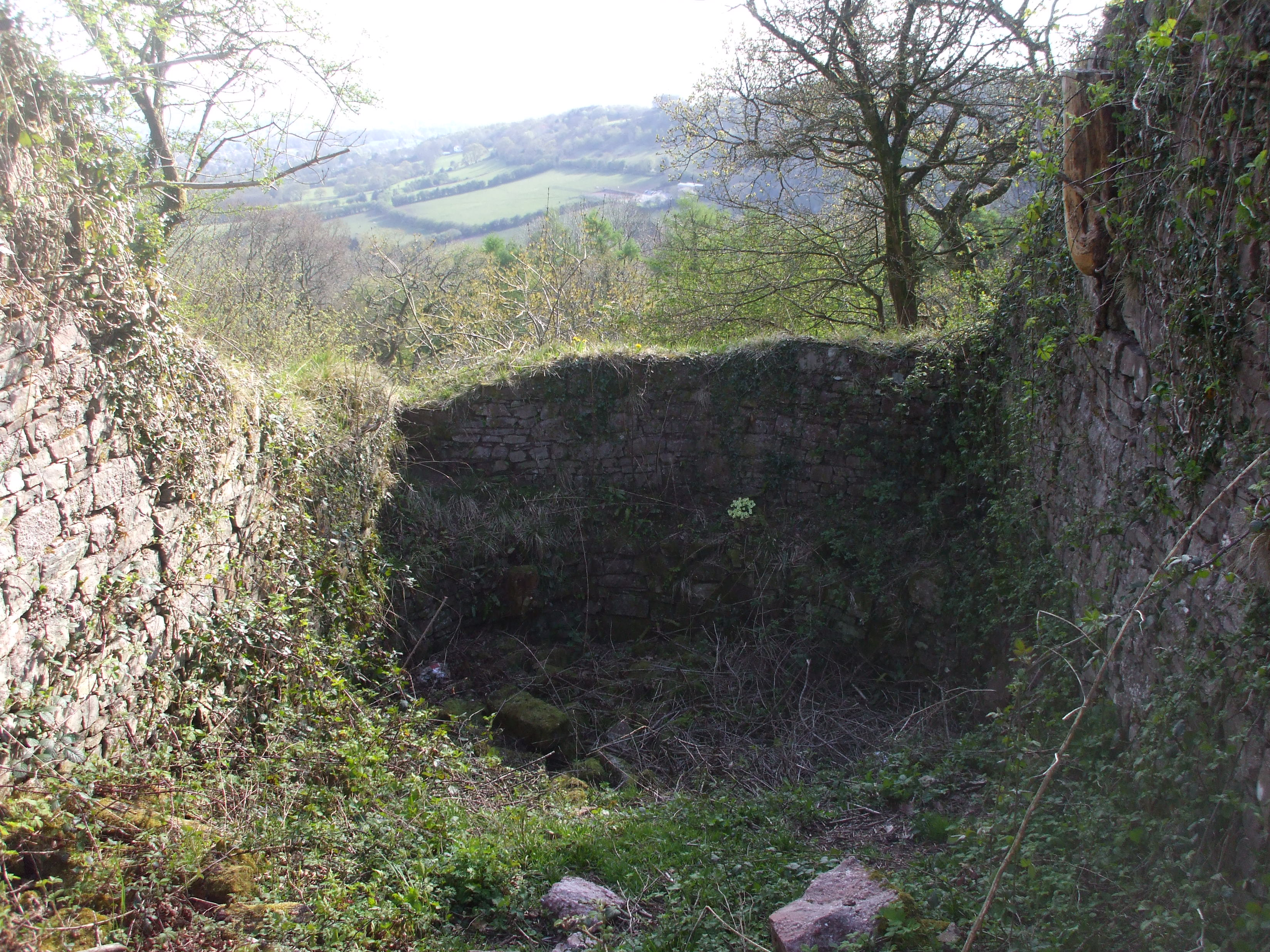
A South-facing rectangular tower of Morgraig Castle

However, a study by Brian Davies of the Gelligaer Historical Society in March 2009 suggests that the castle keep and plain entrance are both features of a Welsh castle. In addition, the Gelligaer Historical Society study suggests that relations between the Lord of Senghennydd and the de Clares were generally friendly at least until the Second Barons' War of 1264–1267. The Second Barons' War was a civil war in England between barons led by Simon de Montfort and Henry III. At first, de Clare and the Lord of Senghenydd were allied, but in 1266, after the Lord of Senghenydd and Llywelyn ap Gruffudd aligned themselves with Simon de Montfort, Gilbert de Clare arrested the Lord of Senghenydd.

In 1257 the de Clare family lost control in the area when Llywelyn ap Gruffudd destroyed their castle at Llangynwyd. Cadw argue that the Lord of Senghennydd would then have been able to obtain Sutton stone to build Morgraig Castle. The Gelligaer Historical Society study suggests that Llywelyn ap Gruffydd had sent his surveyor to help build Morgraig Castle for the Lord of Senghenydd. Gilbert de Clare responded by beginning to construct the larger Caerphilly Castle in 1268. The partially completed Caerphilly Castle was burned down in October 1269 by Llewellyn the Last, but construction began again in 1271 and Caerphilly Castle was ultimately completed. The unfinished Morgraig Castle may have been abandoned at this point because it had no strategic importance to Gilbert de Clare, with much of its stone work being used elsewhere, including Caerphilly Castle.

The castle is now a scheduled monument and a Grade II listed building.

== See also ==
- List of castles in Wales
- Castles in Great Britain and Ireland
