= Colwyn Castle =

Medieval castle in Wales

- Llansantffraed, Powys
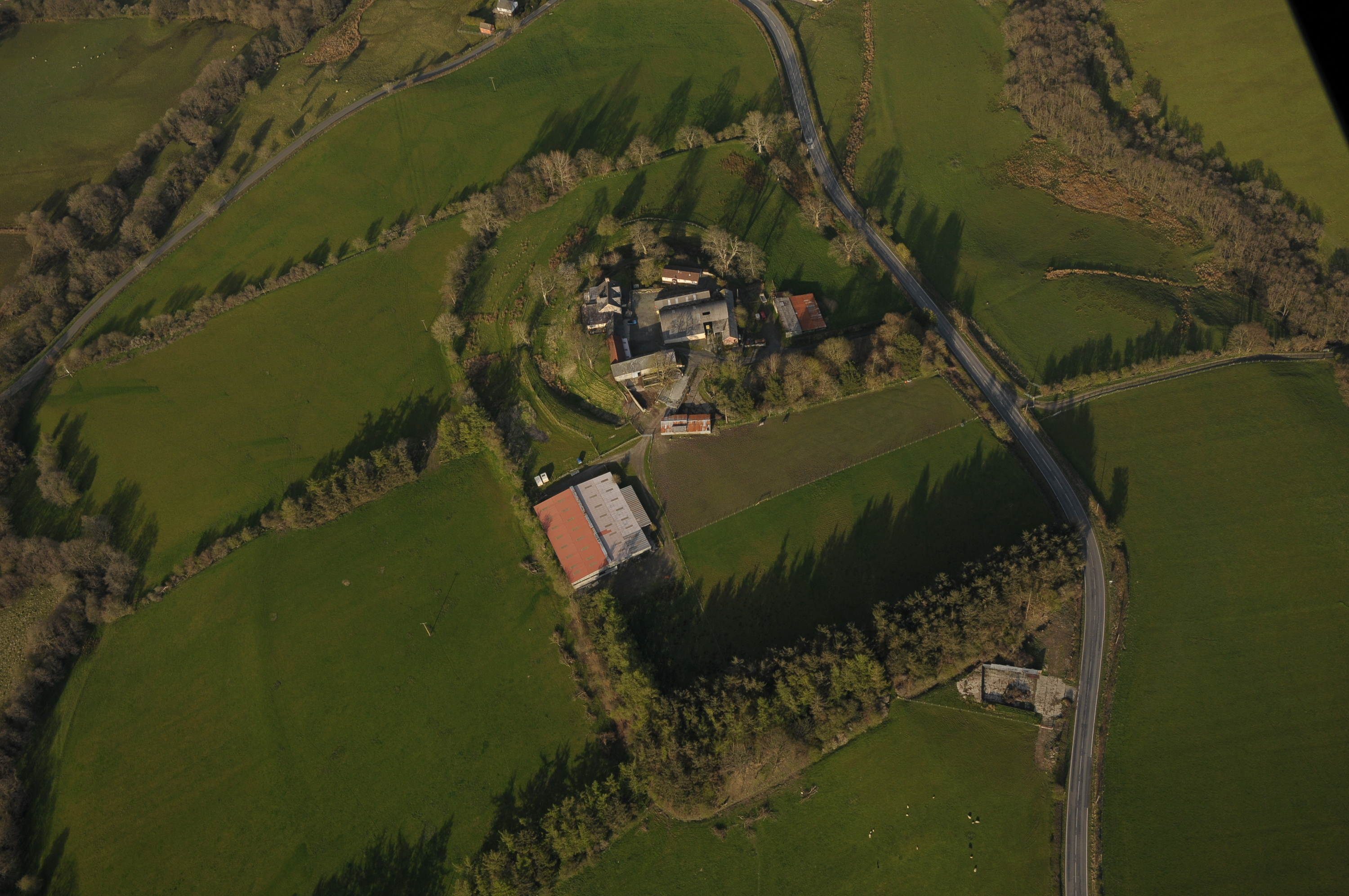
- Colwyn Castle near Hundred House, Glascwm, Powys. The Roman Fort in which the later castle was built is clearly visible, as is the castle earthworks.

Location
- Coordinates: 52.1769°N 3.3065°W
- Grid reference: grid reference SO10765399

Colwyn Castle, also known as Maud's Castle, was a medieval castle near Builth Wells in Wales, in the Manor of Glascwm and the county of Radnorshire. There have been two castles on the site, the first constructed on the site of a Roman fort in 1093 by Raoul II of Tosny. This changed hands several times and was eventually captured and destroyed in 1196 by Rhys ap Gruffydd, who was campaigning against the Normans. The castle was rebuilt by Henry III of England in 1215, and was then rebuilt again in 1242 by Ralph de Mortimer to protect the lordship of Maelienydd, which he had recently acquired. It was finally abandoned during the 14th century. The site of Colwyn Castle now houses a farmhouse, with the outer entrenchments of the castle still in place.

== Location ==
The site where Colwyn Castle stood is located on the A481 road in the Welsh county of Powys, around 5 miles (8.0 km) east of the town of Builth Wells, and just to the west of the small settlement of Hundred House. The road continues east to New Radnor (on the A44 road), which is around 9 miles (14 km) from Colwyn Castle. The castle is at an elevation of around 700 feet (210 m) above sea level and has views of the River Edw to the north and mountains to the south.

== History ==
=== First castle ===
The site was originally home to a Roman fort, on which a motte-and-bailey castle was constructed in around 1093 by Raoul II of Tosny (also known as Ralph Tosny). Some sources indicate that the castle was taken by local ruler Madog ab Idnerth in around 1135, but by 1143 it was in Norman control as there are records of being repaired in 1843 by Ranulf, Earl of Chester. It later passed into Welsh hands and in 1175 is recorded as having been gifted by Rhys ap Gruffydd, the ruler of the local kingdom of Deheubarth, to his son-in-law, Einion Clyd. Rhys was by this time in allegiance with English King Henry II (following years of fighting with territory lost and regained) and was recognised by the latter as Justiciar of South Wales.

When Henry died in 1183, Rhys did not maintain good relations with the English monarchy and he rebelled against Henry's successor, Richard I. The Normans likely regained the castle, as it is thought to have been rebuilt in 1195 by William de Braose, 4th Lord of Bramber. The next year, however, Rhys launched a fresh campaign in the area and, after a siege, he seized the castle once more, along with nearby Carmarthen, Radnor and Painscastle, defeating an army led by Roger de Mortimer and Hugh de Say. Rhys then destroyed the first Colwyn Castle.

=== Second castle ===
Henry III spent a whole summer and autumn at the castle in 1231, overseeing its reconstruction, as well as working on fortification at nearby Painscastle Castle. By this time the castle had been given the alternative name of Maud's Castle, named after Maud de Braose, wife of William de Braose, who had died in 1210 and 1211 respectively.

The castle changed hands several times in subsequent decades as allegiances shifted, notably to Llywelyn ab Iorwerth and Roger Mortimer of Wigmore. It was rebuilt in 1242 by Ralph de Mortimer to protect the lordship of Maelienydd, which he had recently acquired. The Tosny family retook the area in the 1290s and the castle was subsequently abandoned during the 14th century.

== Current site ==
The site of Colwyn Castle now houses a farmhouse, with the outer entrenchments of the castle still in place.
