= Castell Du =

Ruined castle in Powys, Wales

Coordinates: 51.9432°N 3.5731°W

Castell Du (Welsh for 'black castle'), also known as Sennybridge Castle or Castell Rhyd-y-Briw, is located approximately eight miles west of Brecon in Powys, Wales, and is believed to be the work of Llywelyn ap Gruffudd, Prince of Wales. Its history is largely obscure, but a reference to a castle at Rhyd-y-Briw in a document of 1271 is believed to refer to the fortification, and it is not unreasonable to assume that work commenced on it during Llywelyn's triumphal years in the 1260s. Its life would seem to have been short, as there is no further reference to it in thirteenth-century documents, and it seems likely that it was captured by the forces of Edward I of England during the war of 1276–77 and subsequently abandoned. Much of the site remains to be excavated; the remains of a D-shaped tower are visible, and two other towers may lie under pill-boxes erected during the Second World War.

== See also ==
- List of castles in Wales

== Sources ==
- Huw Pryce (ed.), The Acts of Welsh Rulers 1120–1283 (Cardiff, 2005).
