= Cwmhir Abbey =

Monastery near Powys, Wales

- Abaty Cwm-Hir
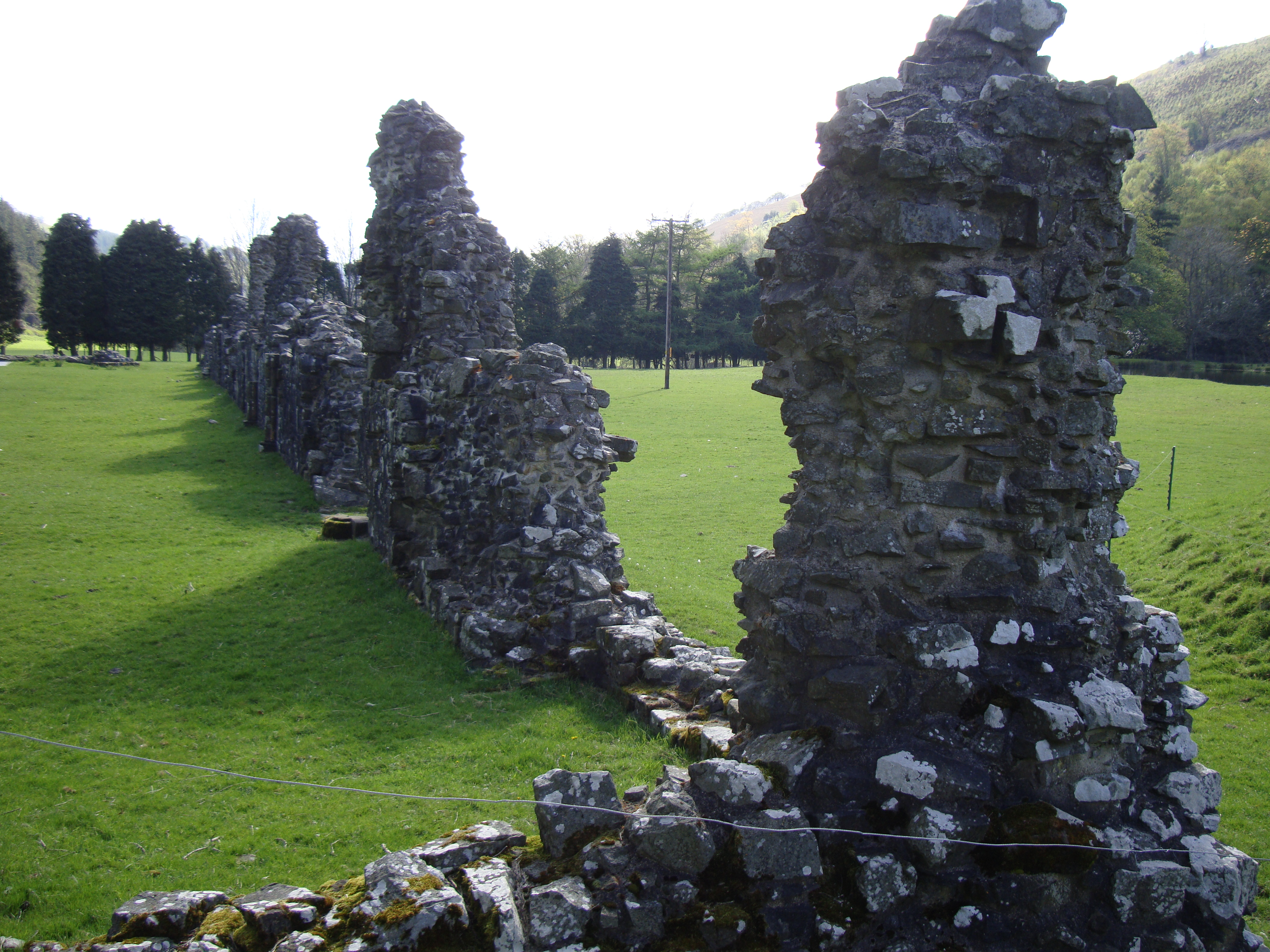
- Ruins of Cwmhir Abbey

- Cwmhir Abbey within Wales

Religion
- Affiliation: Catholicism, Cistercians
- Year consecrated: 1176

Location
- Location: Abbeycwmhir, Powys, Wales
- Coordinates: 52°19′48″N 3°23′14″W

Architecture
- Type: Monastery
- Style: Cistercian
- Funded by: Cadwallon ap Madog

Website
- https://abbeycwmhir.org

Cwmhir Abbey (Welsh: Abaty Cwm Hir), near Llandrindod Wells in Powys, is a Welsh Cistercian monastery founded in 1176 by Cadwallon ap Madog. A spurious tale was later recorded that the abbey was founded in 1143 by Meredudd ap Maelgwn at Ty-faenor, and then refounded at the present location near the village of Abbeycwmhir in 1176. There does appear to be a site movement from Ty-faenor, but Maredudd ap Maelgwn was prince of Maelienydd in 1215 under Prince Llywelyn ab Iorwerth of Gwynedd, who then controlled the district. The later charter to the abbey in 1215 caused the confusion and led to the belief that Maredudd had founded the abbey in 1143.

== History ==
The original lord of Maelienydd, a Welsh prince, Cadwallon ap Madog, was killed by the English Sir Roger Mortimer of Wigmore on 22 September 1179. Mortimer later made a charter as lord of Maelienydd in 1200. The community subsequently suffered over many years due to the blood feud between the descendants of Cadwallon ap Madog and the Mortimers. The princes of Gwynedd gave the monastery their patronage, and twice in the 13th century the abbey granges were burnt by English soldiers and in 1231 the abbot was also fined £200 for aiding the Welsh cause in helping Llywelyn ab Iorwerth destroy an English force near Hay on Wye. In 1232, the Cistercian abbot was granted a license, by Pope Gregory IX, to, "to hear the confessions of, and administer sacraments to, their servants and household..". The headless body of Llywelyn ap Gruffudd, last native Prince of Wales by direct descent, was buried in the abbey after his death in battle nearby in December 1282.

In the early 13th century, the construction of what would have been a spectacular and spacious abbey church were embarked upon, equal in scale to many a cathedral probably by Llywelyn ab Iorwerth. But this project was abandoned shortly after the completion of the 14 bay nave. The ongoing political and social troubles were undoubtedly the cause and the abbey fortunes diminished even further during the significant damage inflicted during the uprising of Owain Glyndŵr from 1401. The monastery intended to support 60 monks at the outset, only had three in residence by the time of the dissolution.

== The dissolution and beyond ==
The abbey was closed in 1536 and became the possession of the Fowler family who built a house on the site. In 1644, during the English Civil War, the house and any surviving monastic structures were wrecked and probably destroyed in the fighting. What little remains was excavated in the 19th century and is open to the public. Only fragmentary stretches of the nave of the church remain visible and a modern grave slab within such commemorates Llywelyn ap Gruffudd, who was killed in 1282 and was buried in the church. The ruined abbey is a grade II* listed structure.

In the parish church of St Idloes, Llanidloes, there are a series of 13th-century arches, and other features, believed to have been taken from the abbey church and re-erected there in 1542.

== See also ==
- List of monastic houses in Wales
- Abbey Cwmhir Hall
- Abbeycwmhir

== Sources ==
- Hays, Rhŷs W. (1971). "The Welsh Monasteries and the Edwardian Conquest". Studies in medieval Cistercian history. Presented to Jeremiah F. O'Sullivan. Cistercian Publications. pp. 110–137.
- Remfry, P. M., The Political History of Abbey Cwmhir, 1176 to 1282 and the Families of Elystan Godrydd, Mortimer and the Princes of Gwynedd (ISBN 1-899376-47-X)
- New, Anthony. 'A Guide to the Abbeys of England and Wales', pp. 132–33. Constable ISBN 0-09-463520-X Amazon.
