= Ystrad Peithyll =

12th-century castle remains in Wales

Coordinates: 52.4232°N 3.9820°W

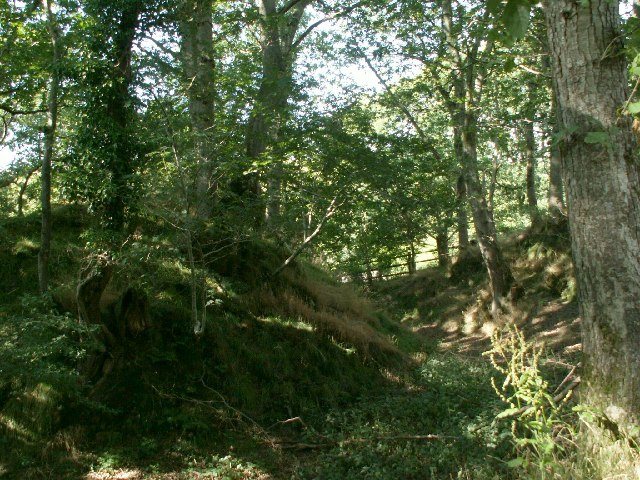
The remaining part of Rhosgoch Motte.

Ystrad Peithyll (also known as Stradpeithyll in the Brut y Tywysogion and Rhosgoch Motte) is the remains of a small 12th-century motte-and-bailey castle on the River Peithyll, near Penrhyn-coch in northern Ceredigion, Wales. The castle was attacked and destroyed by followers of Gruffydd ap Rhys in the early 12th century.

== Geography ==
Ystrad Peithyll Castle is located in the community of Trefeurig, northern Ceredigion, Wales. The structure is listed in the Brut y Tywysogion.

The mound on which the castle was situated measures around 20 metres (66 ft) in diameter with sides around 3.6 metres (12 ft) high. The mound is surrounded by a ditch, up to 15 metres (49 ft) wide in places. The Royal Commission on the Ancient and Historical Monuments of Wales notes the possible presence of a counterscarp on the lower ground.

== History ==
Ystrad Peithyll Castle was built in the wake of the Norman occupation of Wales under Henry I. It was inhabited by a steward named Razo (also referred to as Razon or Ralf), under the command of Gilbert Fitz Richard who had been named Lord of Cardigan in 1110. The castle was one of several fortifications attacked in the rebellion led by Gruffydd ap Rhys (1113 or 1116). The structure was surrounded by enemy forces before being overrun. Many of the inhabitants were killed and the castle itself was set on fire and largely destroyed.

Razo himself was at another castle in his possession at the time, Ystrad Antarron, and Gruffydd ap Rhys subsequently turned his attention to there after sacking Ystrad Peithyll.
