= Gaer Penrhôs =

Former castle in Ceredigion, Wales

Coordinates: 52.3046°N 4.1244°W

Gaer Penrhôs, in Ceredigion, Wales, was a ringwork castle at the summit of a steep hill near the village of Llanrhystud; now all that remains are the outlines of its ringworks. Through the years it has variously been referred to as Llanrhystud Castle and Castell Cadwaladr and has likely been the site of more than one structure.

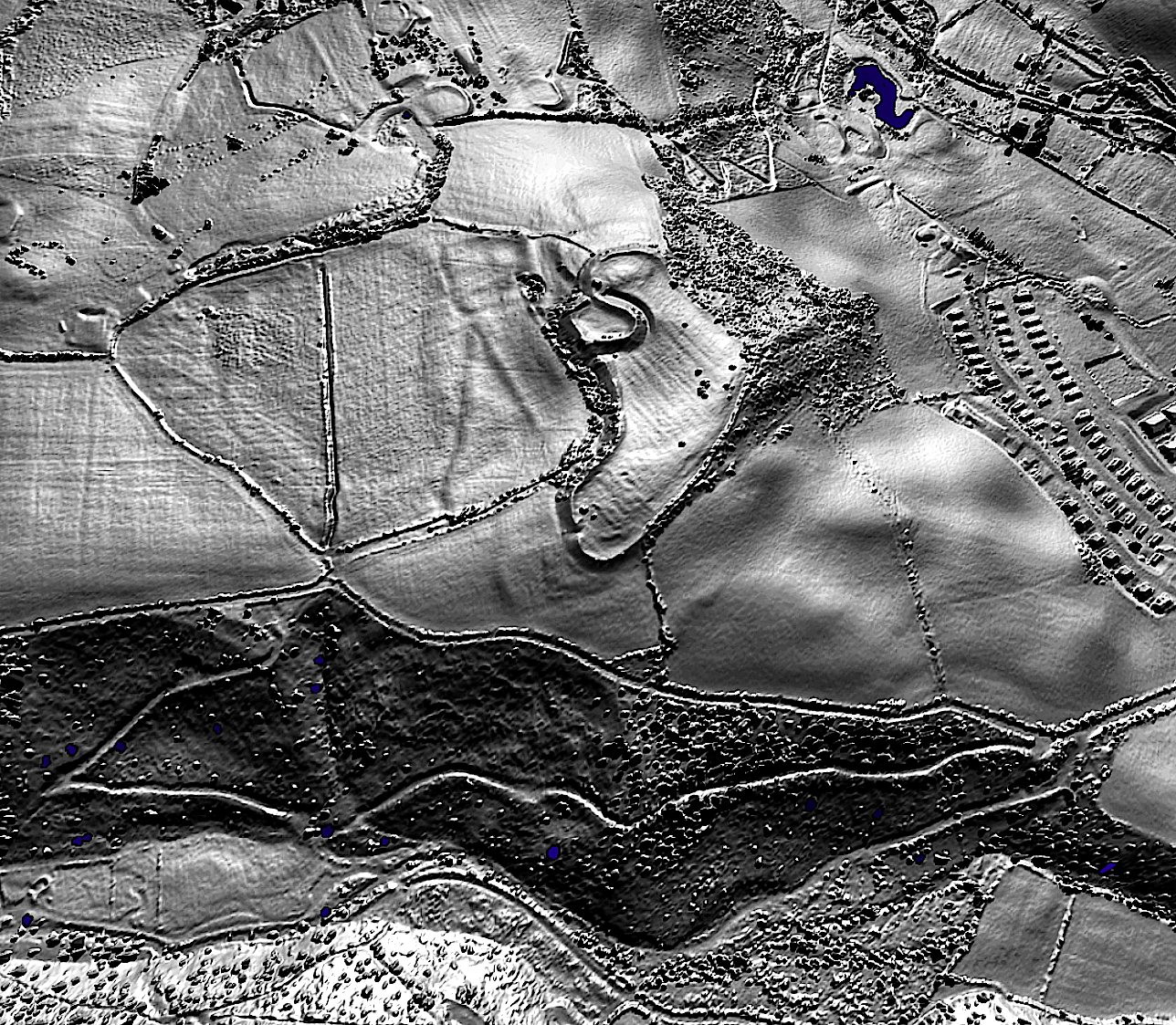
A lidar view of Caer Penrhos.

Gaer Penrhôs commands a view into the mountains of the Ystwyth Valley and over Cardigan Bay. The ringwork consists of a small courtyard enclosed by a large rampart and outer ditch, however it lines up with the remains of what appears to have been a much larger enclosure that could have formed the basis of a much older Roman-era hillfort (which is usually referred to as Caer Penrhos in modern sources).

According to the Royal Commission on the Ancient and Historical Monuments of Wales, a ring motte was first erected by Richard de la Mare in around 1110; just six years later it was captured by Gruffydd ap Rhys, and destroyed by Cadwaladr ap Gruffydd in 1136, who built a new castle on basically the same site in 1149. In 1150, a dispute between Cadwaladr's brother Owain Gwynedd and his nephew Hywel ab Owain Gwynedd, Owain's son, erupted and Hywel seized Gaer Penrhôs for himself. Hywel was only able to retain control of the castle for a year, losing it to Rhys ap Gruffydd and his brothers. The castle hadn't seen the last of Hywel, however; he returned some months later, where he slaughtered the castle's garrison and destroyed its timber defenses.

In 1158 what appears to be a new structure was captured by Normans, but that was likely burned to the ground again when Rhys returned later to scourge every English-controlled castle in Ceredigion.
