= Roger Mortimer of Wigmore =

English medieval marcher lord

Roger Mortimer
- Born: Before 1153
- Died: Before 8 July 1214
- Spouse: Isabel de Ferriers
- Children: 4, including Ralph
- Parents: Hugh de Mortimer (father); Matilda Le Meschin (mother)
- Relatives: Walter de Beauchamp (son-in-law); Walchelin de Ferriers (father-in-law)
- Military career
- Allegiance: Henry II of England

Roger de Mortimer (before 1153 – before 8 July 1214) was a medieval marcher lord, residing at Wigmore Castle in the English county of Herefordshire.

== Early life ==
Roger was the son of Hugh de Mortimer (died 26 February 1181) and Matilda Le Meschin. He fought for King Henry II against the rebellion of the latter's son, Henry.

In 1179 Roger was instrumental in the killing of Cadwallon ap Madog, the prince of Maelienydd and Elfael, both of which he coveted, and was imprisoned until June 1182 at Winchester for this killing.

== Lord of Maelienydd ==
Arms of Mortimer: Barry or and azure, on a chief of the first two pallets between two base esquires of the second over all an inescutcheon argent

In 1195 Roger, with the backing of troops sent by King Richard I, invaded Maelienydd and rebuilt Cymaron Castle. In 1196 he joined forces with Hugh de Say of Richards Castle and fought and lost the battle of New Radnor against Rhys ap Gruffydd, allegedly losing some forty knights and a large number of foot in the fight. By 1200 he had conquered Maelienydd and issued a new charter of rights to Cwmhir Abbey. In the summer of 1214 he became gravely ill and bought from King John the right for his son to inherit his lands while he still lived. He died before 8 July 1214.

== Marriage and issue ==
Roger married Isabel (d. before 29 April 1252), the daughter of Walchelin de Ferriers of Oakham Castle in Rutland before 1196. They had:

- Hugh de Mortimer (d. 1227) – married Annora (Eleanor) de Braose, daughter of William de Braose and his wife Maud
- Ralph de Mortimer (d. 1246)
- Philip Mortimer
- Joan Mortimer (d. 1225) – married May 1212 to Walter II de Beauchamp (1192–1236)

Roger is often wrongly stated to have been the father of Robert Mortimer of Richards Castle (died 1219), who married Margary de Say, daughter of Hugh de Say. But this Robert was born before 1155 and therefore could not have been a son of Roger.

== Sources ==
- Crump, J. J. (1997). "The Mortimer Family and the Making of the March". In Prestwich, Michael; Britnell, R. H.; Frame, Robin (eds.). Thirteenth Century England VI: Proceedings of the Durham Conference 1995. The Boydell Press.
- Holden, Brock (2008). Lords of the Central Marches: English Aristocracy and Frontier Society, 1087-1256. Oxford University Press.259
- Powicke, Frederick Maurice (1960). The Loss of Normandy, 1189-1204: Studies in the History of the Angevin Empire. Manchester University Press.
- Cokayne, George E. Complete Peerage of England, Scotland, Ireland, Great Britain and the United Kingdom/13 Volumes Bound in 6 Books, IV:191; IX:272-3
- Dugdale, William, Monasticon
  - IV, Kington St Michael Nunnery, Wiltshire III
  - VI, Wigmore Abbey, Herefordshire III, Fundationis et Fundatorum Historia
- Annales de Theokesberia
- Annales de Wigornia
