= Crug Eryr Castle =

Welsh Castle

Coordinates: 52.2254°N 3.2347°W

Crug Eryr Castle (Castell Crug Eryr) was a motte and bailey-style castle located atop a hill adjacent to the A44 about 2 miles northwest of Llanfihangel Nant Melan, near New Radnor in Powys, Wales. Crug Eryr, which means "the eagle's mount," was likely situated to block the mountain pass into Maelienydd.

The castle's exact origins are unclear, though some scholars believe it belonged to the princes of Maelienydd, considering that Maelgwn ap Cadwallon, 'Prince of Melenia' (i.e. Maelienydd) son of Cadwallon ap Madog, received the Archbishop of Canterbury at Crug Eryr Castle in March 1188. This occasion was an early stop on the Tour of Wales during which the Archbishop was accompanied by Gerald of Wales. This tour was intended as a recruiting campaign of the Third Crusade.

The herald-bard Llywelyn Crug Eryr lived here in about 1300.
