= Linear earthwork =

Long bank of earth

In archaeology, a linear earthwork is a long bank of earth, sometimes with a ditch alongside. There may also be a palisade along the top of the bank. Linear earthworks may have a ditch alongside which provides the source of earth for the bank and an extra obstacle. There may be a single ditch, a ditch on both sides or no ditch at all. Earthworks range in length from a few tens of metres to more than 80 km. Linear earthworks are also known as dykes (also spelt dike), or "ranch boundaries".

== Functions ==
Linear earthworks may function as defences, as boundary markers to define a territory, to mark out agricultural land, to control movement of people or animals, to levy customs duties or as a combination of some or all of these.

A cross dyke is a type of linear earthwork believed to be a prehistoric land boundary.

== Date and distribution ==
Linear earthworks are found around the world. The earliest dated linear earthwork in the United Kingdom dates to around 3600 BC near Hambleton Hill in Dorset. The Scots' Dike was built in 1552 to mark the border between England and Scotland.

== Examples ==
In Ireland, the Black Pig's Dyke is an example of an Iron Age linear earthwork. In the United Kingdom, Offa’s Dyke, Wat's Dyke and the Wansdyke are examples of early medieval linear earthworks, while the Antonine Wall is a Roman example.

In Africa, the Walls of Benin and Sungbo's Eredo (both in Nigeria) are also examples of linear earthworks; in China some parts of the fortifications that make up the Great Wall are built of earth.

Danevirke in Schleswig-Holstein, Germany and the Götavirke in Sweden are early medieval linear earthworks while the Silesian Walls in Poland and Scots' Dike were built in the later medieval period.

== See also ==
- Levee – a type of linear earthwork that holds back water.
