= Tinboeth Castle =

Wales Castle

- Llanbister, Powys
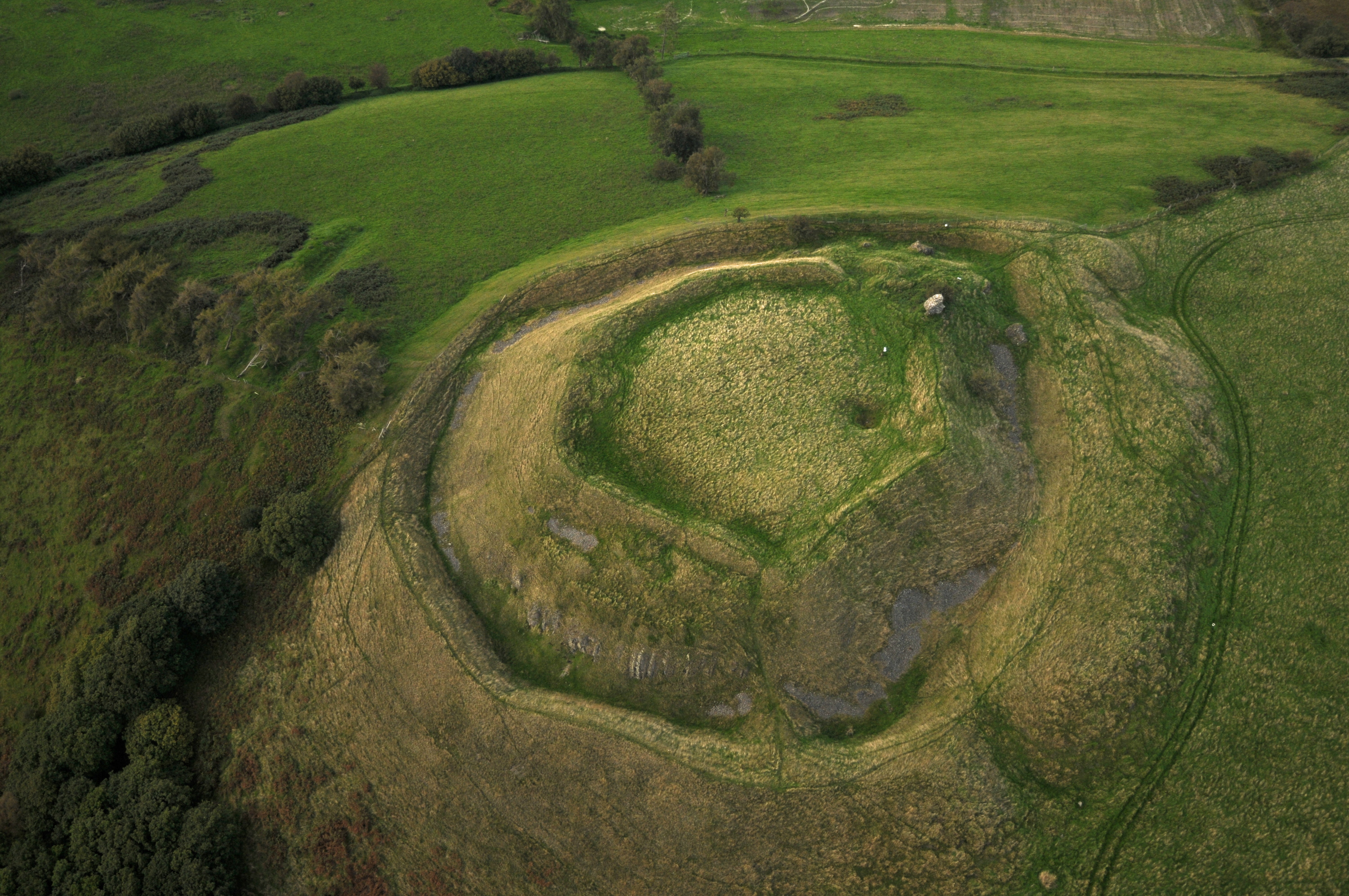
- Tinboeth Castle

Location
- Location within Wales
- Coordinates: 52.3695°N 3.338°W
- Grid reference: grid reference SO 0901775443

Tinboeth Castle (Welsh: Castell Dinbod) was a medieval castle situated midway between Llanbister and Llanbadarn Fynydd in Wales, on a bend in the River Ithon.

The castle is believed to have been built by Roger Mortimer during the 13th century. Following Mortimer's death, the castle fell into ruin and little of the structure remains.

== Geography ==
The site of Tinboeth Castle is located around 11 miles (18 km) from Llandrindod Wells between the villages of Llanbister and Llanbadarn Frynydd. The castle lies on the bank of the River Ithon. The castle was constructed in an Iron Age hillfort and measures around 100 metres (330 ft) in diameter. The Royal Commission on the Ancient and Historical Monuments of Wales notes that the remains indicate the site featured a twin-towered gatehouse on the north-east corner of the structure.

The outer bailey of the castle utilised the hillfort as a defence, while the inner bailey featured a stone wall which was accessed by the gatehouse.

== History ==
Tinboeth Castle is said to have been constructed by Roger Mortimer and first enters the historical record in 1282, a date that it is assumed fairly accurate for its construction. Mortimer also owned another castle, Cymaron, which records show was likely abandoned at the time of Tinboeth's construction. Following Mortimer's death, the ownership of the castle was transferred to the Crown. With Wales becoming largely peaceful, a castle was of little need and it subsequently fell into a state of ruin.

An earthwork remains, believed to be the remains of a wall, but little stonework above ground except the collapsed remains of the gatehouse.
