= Castle Nimble =

Defensive fortification in Wales

Coordinates: 52.2279°N 3.1029°W

Castle Nimble (also called Knapp; Maes Hyfaidd; Maes Hyvaidd) was a motte and bailey defensive fortification near Old Radnor, in Radnorshire (modern-day Powys), Wales. Castle Nimble appears to have had an oval-shaped ditched motte, with a semi-rectangular bailey, and some other enclosures, including possibly a pond.

== History ==
Little of Castle Nimble's history is known, but some believe it may have been established by Philip de Braose. De Braose is known to have erected a castle at Radnor in 1096, believed to be either Castle Nimble or the castle at New Radnor. It is known that after Harold Godwinson, Earl of Hereford, had defeated Gruffydd ap Llywelyn in 1063, he erected a castle, and this may have been Castle Nimble, although an alternative view is that it was New Radnor Castle. Castle Nimble is sometimes known as Old Radnor No 1 to distinguish it from Old Radnor No 2, a more substantial but damaged motte, some 450 m (500 yd) away at Knapp Hill Farm.

== The site ==
Little remains visible nowadays except the remains of an oval motte, some 24 by 20 m (79 by 66 ft) and about 1.6 m (5 ft) high, surrounded by a ditch. The flat summit is about 16 by 12 m (52 by 39 ft) across. To the east lies a semi-rectangular 30 by 20 m (98 by 66 ft) bailey with a ditch round it. There are traces of a further, larger enclosure to the south of the bailey, which may have been a pool or pond, similar to water features found at certain other castles in the district. The height of the mound is very low, leading to the conclusion that some other means of defence, such as a water-filled ditch, is likely to have been used on this low-lying marshy site.
