= Lampeter Castle =

Former castle in Ceredigion, Wales

Coordinates: 52.1145°N 4.0762°W

Lampeter Castle (Welsh: Castell Llanbedr), sometimes known as Stephen's Castle, was built during the Norman expansion into Wales at the end of the eleventh century. The motte is in the grounds of Lampeter University but the precise whereabouts of the bailey is unknown. It was captured by Cadell ap Gruffydd in 1146.

== History ==
Lampeter Castle lies beside one of the main trade routes between South and North of Wales, people settled nearby and the market town of Lampeter came into existence over time. It is not known who originally built the castle but in 1146, it was captured by Cadell ap Gruffydd, Prince of Deheubarth, however he was incapacitated as ruler of Deheubarth five years later when he was attacked while out hunting by a Norman force from Tenby, and was left for dead. At the time, Totnes Priory held St Peter's Church at Lampeter, and the original grantor may have been Stephen, constable of Cardigan.

The castle was the site of several battles. Until the Statute of Wales in 1284, Lampeter was fiercely contested between the English and the Welsh because it was on a trade route that both sides wanted to control.

== The site ==
The motte is to be found at the back of the Old Building at Lampeter University. It is a sizeable mound, being some 100 feet (30 m) wide at the bottom, 25 feet (7.6 m) high and no more than 20 to 25 feet (6.1 to 7.6 m) wide at the top. Although there would have been a bailey, its precise location is unknown, but its outline may have influenced the layout of nearby retaining walls, and may have extended towards the church. The motte has been somewhat truncated by building work and incorporated into the landscaping of the college grounds.
