= Abbeycwmhir =

Village in Wales

Abbeycwmhir: Welsh: Abaty Cwm Hir
- Location within Powys
- Population: 235
- OS grid reference: SO055711
- Principal area: Powys
- Preserved county: Powys
- Country: Wales
- Sovereign state: United Kingdom
- Post town: LLANDRINDOD WELLS
- Postcode district: LD1
- Post town: RHAYADER
- Postcode district: LD6
- Dialling code: 01597
- Police: Dyfed-Powys
- Fire: Mid and West Wales
- Ambulance: Welsh
- UK Parliament: Brecon, Radnor and Cwm Tawe
- Senedd Cymru – Welsh Parliament: Brecon and Radnorshire
- List of places UK Wales Powys 52.3303°N 3.3871°W Community map: Map of the community

Abbeycwmhir or Abbey Cwmhir (Welsh: Abaty Cwm Hir, "Abbey in the Long Valley") is a village and community in the valley of the Nant Clywedog in Powys, Wales. The community includes the hamlet of Bwlch-y-sarnau. It was historically in Radnorshire.

== The Abbey ==
The village is named after Cwmhir Abbey, the Cistercian abbey built there in 1143. It was the largest abbey in Wales, but was never completed. Its fourteen bay nave was longer than Canterbury and Salisbury Cathedral naves and twice as long as that at St. Davids. It was a daughter house of Whitland Abbey, and was constructed at the behest of three sons of Madog, the then Prince of southern Powys. The first community at Dyvanner (Welsh: Ty faenor, "Manor House") failed because of the intervention of Hugh de Mortimer, Earl of Hereford, but in 1176 Rhys ap Gruffydd of Deheubarth re-established the Abbey on land given by Cadwallon ap Madog. Llywelyn ap Gruffudd is buried near the altar in the nave.

The abbey was burned by the forces of Owain Glyndŵr in 1401. At the time of the dissolution of the monasteries in March 1537, only three monks lived in the abbey.

The Abbey was slighted in 1644, during the English Civil War, although some ruins still remain. There is a memorial stone to Llywelyn ap Gruffudd, the last native Prince of Wales of direct descent, whose body is buried there.

== Places of note ==
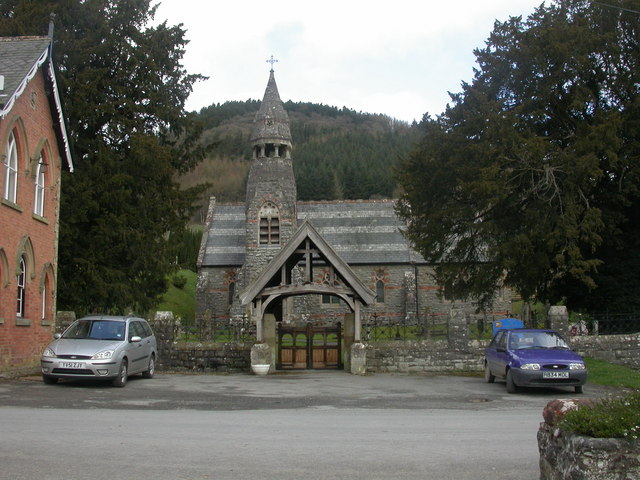
St Mary's Church

- The village church of St Mary was rebuilt in the Neo-Byzantine style by Mary Beatrice Philips in 1866. She was a granddaughter of Francis Philips, who purchased the Abbeycwmhir estate in 1837 with money from the cotton trade. It replaced a church built in 1680. Soon after the Victorian church was built, the writer Francis Kilvert visited.
- The Happy Union Inn is a Grade II listed building. Its age is unknown. The present owner is the third generation of his family to run the pub.
- Abbey Cwmhir Hall is a Georgian style house built in 1833 by Thomas Wilson, a London lawyer who had purchased the 3,000-acre (1,200 ha) Abbeycwmhir estate. It is open to the public.

== See also ==
- Glyndŵr's Way
