= Burfa Castle =

Hillfort in Powys, Wales

Coordinates: 52.2426°N 3.0489°W

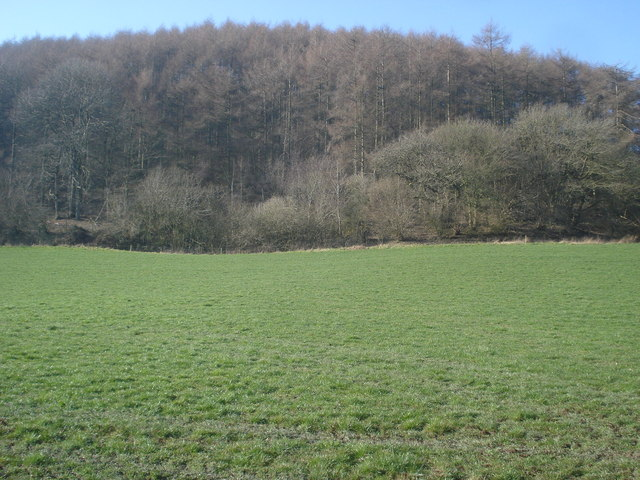
Burfa Wood viewed from the east. Burfa Camp was on the summit of the hill

Burfa Castle (also known as Burfa Hillfort, Burfa Bank Hillfort, or Burfa Camp) is an Iron Age hillfort near the village of Old Radnor, Radnorshire in Powys, Wales. The site is a scheduled monument described as a prehistoric defensive hillfort, and was included in an inventory of monuments by 1913. The site is near Offa's Dyke which passes near the bottom of Burfa Bank.

The site is an important multivallate site and measures 579 metres by 187 metres. Little of the hillfort is visible today and the site has been badly damaged by forestry. On the side of the hillfort's likely entrance are three or four banks and ditches, "incorporating a torturous entrance approach".

Material dating from the 1st and 2nd century CE has been found at the site. Further, the Radnor Valley was at the edge of known Roman settlements; though the valley is not thought to have been home to any permanent Roman settlements, traces of an auxiliary fort and troop camps have been found in the area, including one at Burfa.
