= Painscastle Castle =

Coordinates: 52°06′N 3°13′W

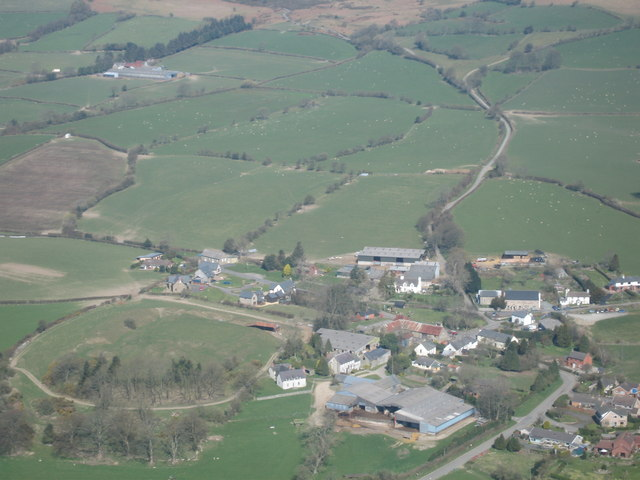
Painscastle, aerial view, with motte and bailey castle (to left)

Painscastle Castle is a castle in the village of Painscastle in Powys, Wales. It lies between Builth and Hay-on-Wye, approximately 3 miles from the Wales-England border today.

== Early history ==
The first castle would appear to have been built by Pain fitzJohn. The site was probably what remained of a much earlier Roman fort, so naturally defensible. The ground plan is rectangular and Roman artifacts have been found at the site.

Pain fitzJohn was killed by a Welsh raiding party in 1137 and Elfael in which Painscastle stands, was taken over by the native Welsh ruler, Madog ab Idnerth.

== Recapture and refortification ==
The castle remained in Welsh hands until about 1195 when the area was captured by William de Braose, 4th Lord of Bramber, who refortified the castle. His formidable wife Maud de Braose, also known as Matilda, held Painscastle against the Welsh for a few months.

== Welsh sieges ==
In 1196 Rhys ap Gruffudd of Deheubarth defeated the Marcher Lords in a battle at Radnor 8 miles to the north and also besieged Painscastle, but did not actually take it as terms were agreed. In 1198 Gwenwynwyn ab Owain of Powys raised a large army to besiege the castle, but was heavily defeated by an army led by the Justiciar, Geoffrey fitz Peter. This English army formed at nearby Hay on Wye.

== Baronial conflict ==
William de Braose fell out with king John of England in 1208 and was forced to flee the kingdom. King John held his lands and castles until Painscastle was apparently occupied by Iorwerth Clud, a Welsh de Braose ally, in 1215. He submitted to King John in 1216 and was granted the Lordship of Elfael until his death in 1222. The Welsh then transferred their allegiance back to Llywelyn ap Iorwerth and the castle was attacked and destroyed by the Welsh.

== Campaign against Llywelyn the Great ==
In 1231 the castle was rebuilt in stone by King Henry III of England and Hubert de Burgh as part of a campaign against Llywelyn the Great. In 1233 the castle was claimed by Ralph Tosny, whose family held it until the castle was taken by Llywelyn ap Gruffudd from Roger Tosny in 1265. Another Ralph Tosny was able to recover and rebuild it in 1276.

It later passed to the Beauchamp dynasty's hands, Earls of Warwick.

== Owain Glyndŵr ==
Painscastle was refortified yet again at the time of the Welsh rebellion led by Owain Glyndŵr in 1401 while under the Beauchamps for the King, Henry IV.

== Today ==
Little now remains of the castle other than the massive earthworks.
