= Cadwallon ap Madog =

Welsh royal

Cadwallon ap Madog was the son of Madog ab Idnerth who had died in 1140, while Idnerth was a grandson of Elystan Glodrydd who had died in around 1010 and had founded a dynasty in the Middle Marches of Wales, in the area known as Rhwng Gwy a Hafren (Between Wye & Severn).

== Prince of Maelienydd ==
After the death of Madog ab Idnerth, there was clearly a great deal of conflict in the Middle March between his family and the Norman Marcher lords. Madog is known to have had at least five sons of whom Hywel ap Madog and Cadwgan ap Madog were killed in 1142 by Helias de Say, the Lord of Clun. Another son - Maredudd ap Madog - was killed by Hugh de Mortimer in 1146. This left two surviving sons, who ended up in control of the two principal divisions of their father's lands in Rhwng Gwy a Hafren: Cadwallon ap Madog ruled Maelienydd and his younger brother Einion Clud ruled Elfael. The two fell out and Cadwallon is recorded as having seized Einion and handed him over to Owain Gwynedd, who in turn handed him over to Henry II. But Einion was later free, joining with his brother to rally under the banner of Owain Gwynedd at Corwen in 1165.

In the summer of 1175 Cadwallon and Einion followed Rhys ap Gruffudd to Gloucester where he made a peace treaty with King Henry II, buying recognition from the king for his holding the land of Maelienydd. The Brut y Twysogion records this with the words: And then the Lord Rhys ap Gruffudd prepared to go to the king’s court at Gloucester. And he took along with him, by the king’s counsel, all the princes of the South who had been in opposition to the king, to wit: Cadwallon ap Madog of Maelienydd, his first-cousin [i.e. Rhys’s cousin], and Einion Clud of Elfael...

Cadwallon also seems to have been responsible for building or fortifying several castles in the Middle Marches. He fought at least one battle at Ednol and was 'the renowned possesser of Cymaron' and its castle. It seems he built Crug Eryr Castle and brought destruction to the English Marches of Herefordshire and Shropshire. In 1176 he profited most from the death of his brother Einion when he annexed his lands. The next year he was described as "king" of Elfael by an English court official.

== His death ==
In September 1179 he appeared in the royal court to answer charges of waging war against the king's peace. In this he appears to have been successful, but on returning home to Elfael he was met by men owing allegiance to Roger Mortimer of Wigmore and was cut down and killed on 22 September. The king was outraged as Cadwallon was under a royal safe conduct. Mortimer was imprisoned in Winchester for two years and his associates who did the killing were in turn hunted down, some turning to outlawry, others to exile and some being executed.

== His descendants ==
Ancient pedigrees show Efa ferch Madog, the daughter of Madog ap Maredudd Prince of Powys (last to rule over a united Kingdom of Powys) as his wife. She was living in 1176. By her he appears to have had at least five children: Joan ferch Cadwallon, Maelgwn ap Cadwallon (d. 1197), Hywel ap Cadwallon (d. 1212), Llywelyn ap Cadwallon (mutilated), Owain Cascob ap Cadwallon (d. 1198).

== Sources ==
- Remfry, P.M., The Political History of Abbey Cwmhir, 1176 to 1282 and the Families of Elystan Godrydd, Mortimer and the Princes of Gwynedd (ISBN 1-899376-47-X)
- Remfry, P.M., The Native Welsh Dynasties of Rhwng Gwy a Hafren, 1066 to 1282 [M.Phil Thesis, Aberystwyth, 1989]
