= Aberedw Castle =

Castle ruins in Powys, Wales

Coordinates: 52.11706°N 3.34474°W

- Powys, Wales
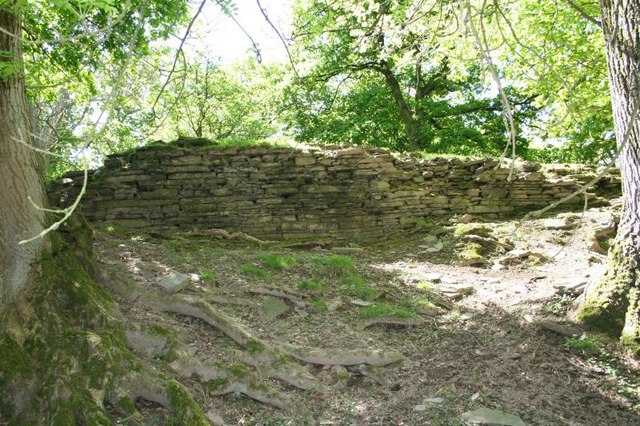
- The best preserved part of Aberedw Castle

Site information
- Type: Castle
- Condition: Ruined

Site history
- Built: 1093
- Demolished: Partially demolished in the 19th century

The remains of Aberedw Castle, also known as 'Castle in Elfael Uwch Mynydd', are located at the small village of Aberedw in the county of Powys, Mid-Wales. It was built in the late twelfth century and probably replaced the motte and bailey castle a few hundred metres away.

== History ==
The castle was signed to Walter Heckelutel, as a Licence of the Crenellate, by King Edward I of England on 24 November 1284. This licence to crenellate was thought of as a way for central authority to exert power over the lords, although this is not confirmed. It is also suggested however, that the castle dates back to 1093 when the Normans invaded South Wales.

Aberedw is more famously known to be the residence of Llewelyn ap Gruffydd. This man is very well known as the last native Prince of Wales. Aberedw was the last retreat Llewelyn made before he was killed and beheaded by Adam Francton, who then had his head sent to the King of England, in 1282.

== Description ==
It was a rectangular stone castle with circular towers 6 metres (20 ft) in diameter at the angles, surrounded by a moat approximately 10 to 15 metres (33 to 49 ft) wide. It stands to the east of the River Wye floodplain and remains of the moat are visible on the other three sides. It was entered via a causeway across the ditch on the east side and there are some signs of internal buildings. The eastern towers show some signs of latrine chutes. Today it is a ruin, as most of the west side was destroyed by railway construction in the 19th century. Many stones from the castle were used in the construction of the foundations of the track. The ruins are in poor shape and there is active erosion that is damaging the site.
