= Bachawy =

River in Powys, Wales

Bachawy River
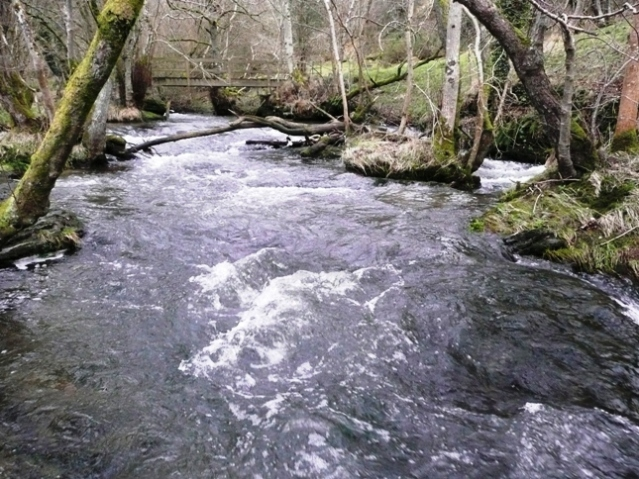
- The Bachawy River

- Location of the mouth

Location
- Country: United Kingdom
- Country: Wales

Physical characteristics
- Mouth
  - coordinates: 52°04′36″N 3°18′24″W

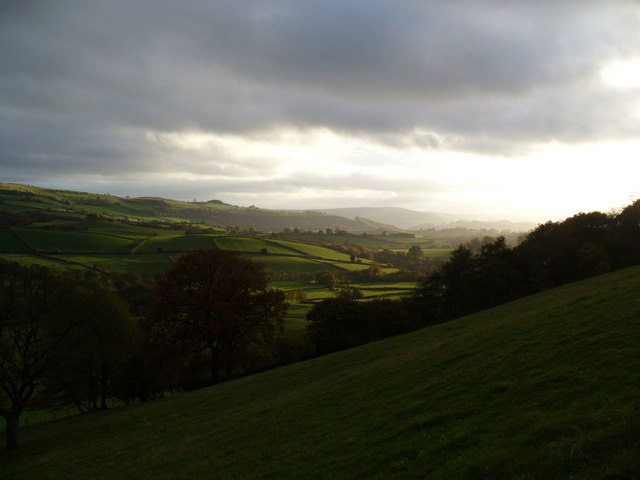
Bachawy Valley

The Bachawy (Welsh: Nant Bachawy) (or Bach Howey on Early Ordnance Survey maps.) is a minor river in Powys, Wales. It rises in the hills north of Painscastle, flowing initially to the southeast before turning to the southwest at Rhosgoch, assuming a more westerly direction at Painscastle then wrapping around the western end of the Begwns as it drops into a wooded gorge to join the River Wye as a left-bank tributary near to Erwood. Rain falling on the southern slopes of Llanbedr Hill and the northern slopes of the Begwns makes its way into the Bachawy. Much of the Bachawy's valley is developed in Silurian age mudstones and siltstones and parts are aligned with the Church Stretton Fault Zone. The lower gorge is cut in part through late Silurian age Raglan Mudstone Formation which forms the lowest part of the Old Red Sandstone.

At the eastern end of its catchment is Rhos Goch Common National Nature Reserve. Another notable nature reserve within its catchment is Llan Bwch-llyn Lake, a stream draining which, enters the Bachawy as a right-bank tributary below Llanddewi. The lake is the largest natural water body in the old county of Radnorshire and is a site of special scientific interest. It is managed on behalf of Dwr Cymru Welsh Water by the Radnorshire Wildlife Trust as a reserve both for its wetland plants and its birdlife. Some notable plants found here include bogbean, lesser skullcap, devil's bit scabious and globe flower. There are northern pike, European perch and common rudd in the lake and breeding birds include sedge warbler, Eurasian reed warbler and common reed bunting, as well as coot, moorhen and water rail. Winter visitors include teal, tufted duck, mallard, pochard and goldeneye. The lake is mentioned by the famed curate from Clyro, the Reverend Francis Kilvert in his diary.
