= Colwyn Rural District =

Rural district in Radnorshire, Wales

Coordinates: 52.149°N 3.404°W

Colwyn
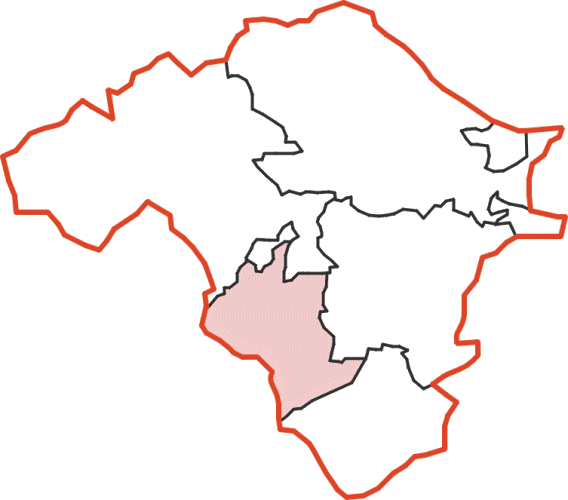
- Area
  - 1911: 29,579 acres (119.70 km^{2})
  - 1931: 29,579 acres (119.70 km^{2})
  - 1961: 29,579 acres (119.70 km^{2})
- Population
  - 1901: 1,882
  - 1931: 2,043
  - 1971: 1,682
- History
  - Origin: Sanitary district
  - Created: 1894
  - Abolished: 1974
  - Succeeded by: Radnorshire
- Status: Rural district
- Government: Colwyn Rural District Council
  - HQ: Builth Wells
- Subdivisions
  - Type: Civil parishes

Colwyn was, from 1894 to 1974, a rural district in the administrative county of Radnorshire, Wales.

The district was formed by the Local Government Act 1894, when the existing Builth Rural Sanitary District was divided into two: the section in Brecknockshire was reconstituted as Builth Rural District and that in Radnorshire as Colwyn Rural District. The new district took its name from the ancient hundred of Colwyn. The council continued to be based in Builth Wells in Breconshire.

The rural district comprised ten civil parishes:

- Aberedw
- Bettws Disserth
- Cregrina
- Disserth and Trecoed
- Llanbadarn y Garreg
- Llandrindod Rural
- Llanelwedd
- Llanfaredd
- Llansaintfraed in Elvel
- Rhulen

The district was abolished in 1974 under the Local Government Act 1972, which completely reorganised local administration in England and Wales. Its area became part of the District of Radnor in the new county of Powys.
