= Erwood station =

Erwood station may refer to:

- Erwood railway station
- Erwood transmitting station
