= Painscastle Rural District =

Former local government area in the UK

Coordinates: 52.109°N 3.218°W

Painscastle
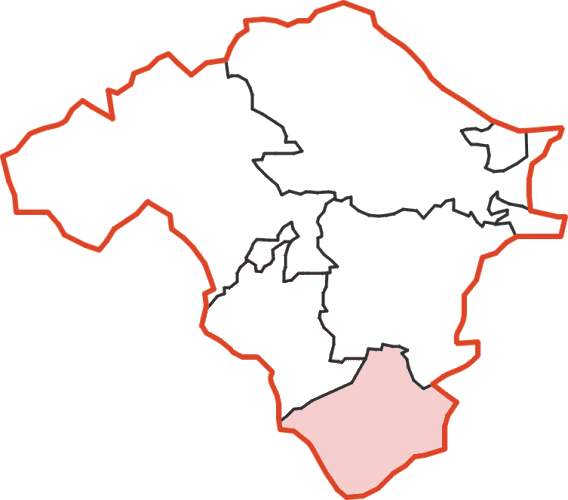
- Area
  - 1911: 31,414 acres (127.13 km^{2})
  - 1931: 31,414 acres (127.13 km^{2})
  - 1961: 31,414 acres (127.13 km^{2})
- Population
  - 1901: 2,339
  - 1931: 2,149
  - 1971: 1,510
- History
  - Origin: Sanitary district
  - Created: 1894
  - Abolished: 1974
  - Succeeded by: Radnorshire
- Status: Rural district
- Government: Painscastle Rural District Council
  - HQ: Hay on Wye
- Subdivisions
  - Type: Civil parishes

Painscastle was, from 1894 to 1974, a rural district in the administrative county of Radnorshire, Wales.

The district was formed by the Local Government Act 1894, when the existing Hay Rural Sanitary District was divided into three: the section in Breconshire was reconstituted as Hay Rural District, the area in Herefordshire became Bredwardine Rural District, while the parishes in Radnorshire became Painscastle Rural District. The new district took its name from the ancient hundred of Painscastle. The council continued to be based in Hay on Wye in Breconshire.

The rural district comprised nine civil parishes:

- Boughrood
- Bryngwyn
- Cleiro
- Glasbury
- Llanddewi Fach
- Llandeilo Graban
- Llanstephan
- Llowes
- Painscastle

The district was abolished in 1974 under the Local Government Act 1972, which completely reorganised local administration in England and Wales. Its area became part of the District of Radnor in the new county of Powys.

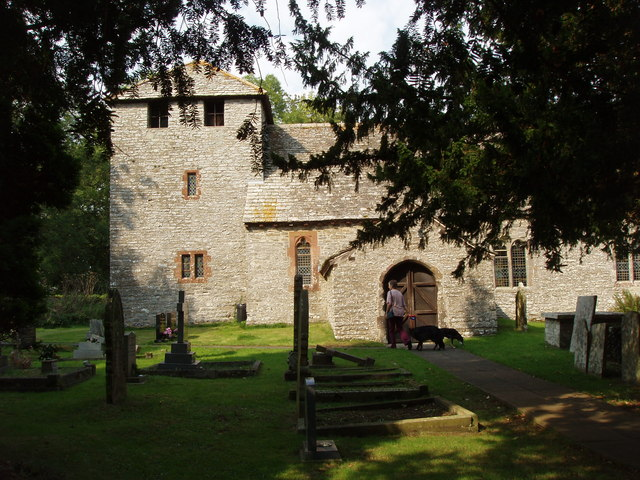
St Teilo's Church, Graban. Llandeilo Graban
