= Radnorshire =

Historic county of Wales

Coordinates: 52°15′N 3°15′W

Radnorshire Sir Faesyfed (Welsh)
- Historic county and district
- 1536–1974/1996
- Area
  - 1831: 272,128 acres (1,101.26 km^{2})
  - 1911: 301,165 acres (1,218.77 km^{2})
  - 1961: 301,165 acres (1,218.77 km^{2})
- Population
  - 1831: 24,651
  - 1901: 23,281
  - 1971: 18,271
  - 1992: 24,000
- Density
  - 1831: 0.1/acre
- Status: Non-administrative county (1536–1889); Administrative county (1889–1974); District of Powys (1974–1996); Historic county (non-administrative)
- Chapman code: RAD
- Government: Radnorshire County Council (1889–1974); Radnorshire District Council (1974–1996)
  - HQ: Presteigne (until 1974); Llandrindod Wells (from 1974–1996)
  - Motto: Ewch yn Uwch (Go Higher)
- History
  - Established: 1536
  - Council established: 1889
  - Disestablished: 1974/1996
  - District status: 1974–1996
- Subdivisions
  - Type: Hundreds, sanitary districts, urban districts, rural districts
Succeeded by
Powys

Map of the district of Powys

Radnorshire (Welsh: Sir Faesyfed) was one of the thirteen counties of Wales that existed from 1536 until their abolition in 1974, later becoming a district of Powys from 1974 to 1996. It covered a sparsely populated area, and was bounded to the north by Montgomeryshire and Shropshire, to the east by Herefordshire, to the south by Brecknockshire and to the west by Cardiganshire.

The county was formed in 1536 (Note: Dates in this article before 14 September 1752 are in the Julian calendar and 1 January is treated as the beginning of the year, even though 25 March was treated as the beginning of the year until 1752.) from several Marcher lordships under the Laws in Wales Acts, as part of the formal annexation of Wales into the Kingdom of England by Henry VIII. The county was named after New Radnor, which was the original county town. From 1543 onwards the assizes were held alternately at New Radnor and Presteigne, later settling at Presteigne alone. Presteigne then served as the county's administrative centre until 1889 when Radnorshire County Council was established and chose to base itself in Llandrindod Wells instead.

The administrative county was abolished in 1974, with the area becoming the lower-tier Radnor district within the new county of Powys. The district was renamed Radnorshire in 1989. Radnorshire District Council was abolished in 1996 when Powys became a unitary authority. Powys County Council then had a Radnorshire "shire committee" until 2018.

The largest town in Radnorshire was Llandrindod Wells, with other towns being Knighton, Presteigne, and Rhayader. The Radnor Forest is an area of high ground covering a large part of the east of former county.

== History ==
The geographic territory of what was Radnorshire roughly corresponds with the Welsh territory of Rhwng Gwy a Hafren (English: Between Wye and Severn) which fell under the control of the Marcher Lords at the end of the 11th century. The area that would become Radnorshire included Cwmhir Abbey, a Cistercian monastery founded in 1176 at Abbeycwmhir. The Battle of Bryn Glas was fought on 22 June 1402 at Pilleth during the rebellion of Owain Glyndŵr.

Until the Laws in Wales Act 1535, Radnor was outside the Principality of Wales. This peculiar Marcher status and its wont of Welsh speakers gave weight to the traditional local expression, "Neither Wales nor England, just Radnorsheer"

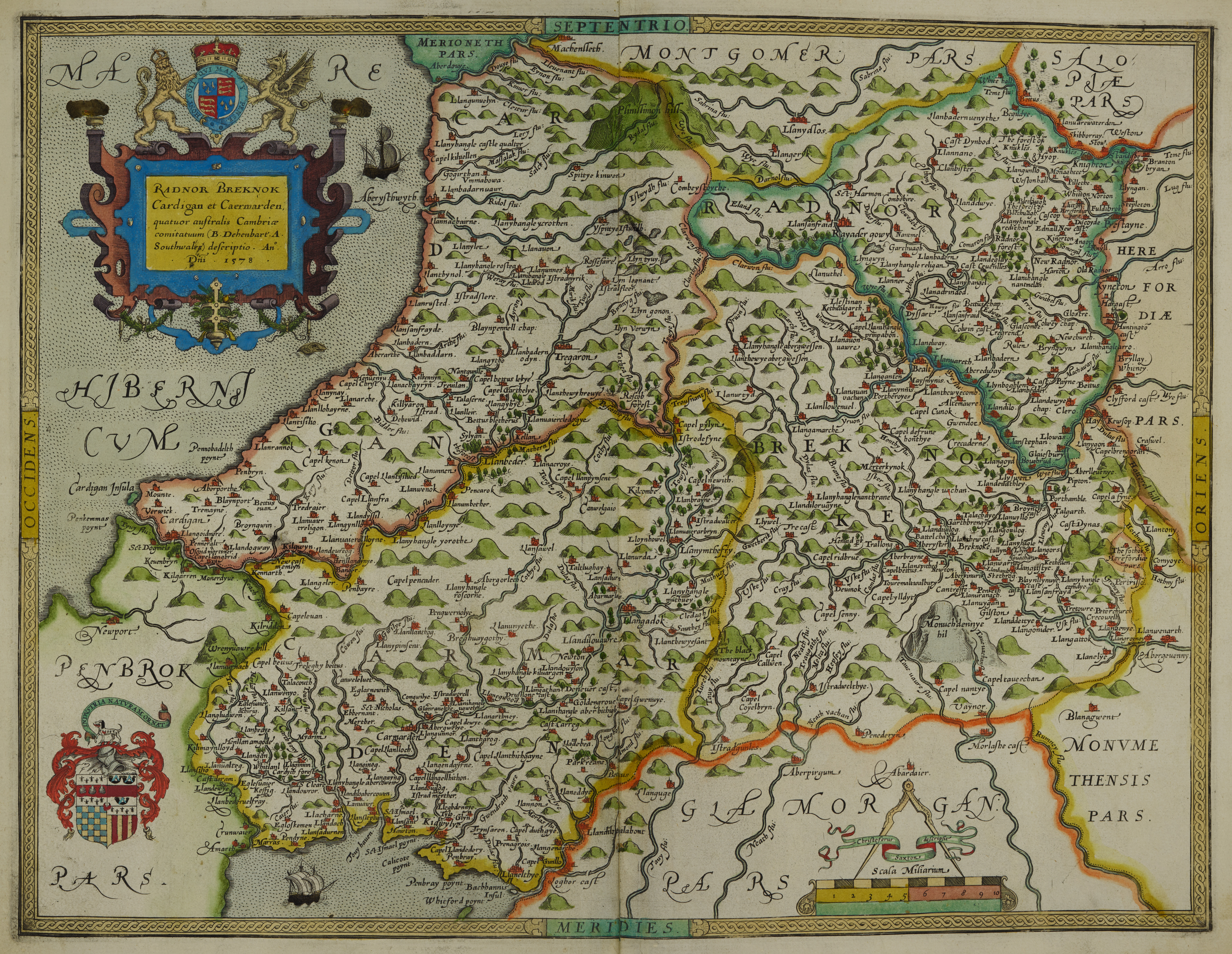
Hand-drawn map of Radnorshire, Brecknockshire, Ceredigion and Carmarthenshire by Christopher Saxton in 1578

The 1535 act created Radnorshire from a number of former territories, including the cantrefs of Maelienydd and Elfael and the commotes of Gwrtheyrnion and Deuddwr. The act also specified that New Radnor was the county town, and directed that the county's assizes and quarter sessions should be held alternately at New Radnor and Rhayader. A judge was murdered at Rhayader a few years later, highlighting the dangers to English judges in that part of the county. In 1543 the law was changed, directing that the assizes should no longer be held at Rhayader, but should instead alternate between New Radnor and Presteigne. The practice of holding sessions alternately at New Radnor and Presteigne later gave way to all sessions being held at Presteigne.

The county's poverty was remarked upon thus in the 17th century by an anonymous visitor:

Poor Radnorsheer, poor Radnorsheer,
Never a park, and never a deer,
Never a squire of five hundred a year,
Save Richard Fowler of Abbey-Cwm-hir

Apart from a handful of parishes along the English border the Welsh language remained the first language of the county well into the second half of the eighteenth century. By 1850 the language had retreated to the western parishes of Rhayader, Llanyre, Cwmdauddwr, St Harmon and Nantmel. By 1900 Welsh was still spoken by a sizeable minority west of the town of Rhayader, the language disappearing as the century progressed. Of course there were Welsh speakers living in Radnorshire who had come from other parts of Wales, and today their number has been swollen by children being educated through the medium of Welsh in school.

When elected county councils were established in 1889 under the Local Government Act 1888, taking over the local government functions of the old court of quarter sessions, the new Radnorshire County Council decided to meet at Llandrindod Wells rather than Presteigne. The county council was abolished in 1974 under the Local Government Act 1972.

The area became the lower-tier Radnor district within the new county of Powys. The district was renamed Radnorshire in 1989. Radnorshire District Council was abolished in 1996 when Powys became a unitary authority. Powys County Council then had a Radnorshire "shire committee" comprising the Powys councillors elected from the wards covering the former Radnorshire district from 1996 until the county council abolished its shire committees in 2018.

== Geography ==
In the east and south were some comparatively level tracts, including the Vale of Radnor, but much of the county is forest, moorland and low mountains, with the Cambrian Mountains running through the west of the county beyond Rhayader. The Radnor Forest is a slightly isolated dome of hills in the middle of the county near the village of New Radnor, and included what was the highest ground in the former county. Here is found the former county top of Great Rhos, at a height of 660 metres (2,170 ft) above sea level. The Elan Valley contains several huge man-made reservoirs supplying water to Birmingham. The main rivers were the Wye, the Teme, the Elan and the Ithon. The Teme formed the boundary with Shropshire.

The chief towns were Knighton, Llandrindod Wells, Presteigne and Rhayader. The backbone of local incomes was tourism, hill farming and the public sector such as care, education and road/public land maintenance. Sheep, dairy/cattle and poultry farming provided more revenue than crops which like much of Scotland, the Pennines and Wales received more than national average precipitation and can be subject to late frosts.

== Governance ==
=== Constituencies ===
From 1542 there was a Radnorshire constituency for electing members of parliament to the English (and later United Kingdom) parliament. The constituency was abolished in 1918, merging with the neighbouring Breconshire constituency to become the Brecon and Radnorshire constituency. Brecon and Radnorshire is also the name of the Senedd constituency covering the area. Since 2024 the area has been a part of the Brecon, Radnor and Cwm Tawe constituency in the United Kingdom parliament.

=== Local government subdivisions ===
==== Hundreds ====
On the creation of the county it was divided into six hundreds. The names of the hundreds, which were not always consistently spelt, were as follows:

- Colwyn
- Cefnllys (Kevenlleece or Cevnllŷs)
- Knighton
- Painscastle
- Radnor
- Rhaiadr (or Rhayader)

==== Poor law unions ====
In the 19th century new structures of local administration were introduced. The Poor Law Amendment Act 1834 grouped parishes into poor law unions. While these were not themselves local authorities, their boundaries were to later be used to define local government districts. PLUs did not conform to county boundaries, but consisted of catchment areas for workhouses. Most of Radnorshire was included in the three unions of Knighton, Presteigne and Rhayader. Parishes on the edges of the county were included in unions based in other counties: Builth and Hay on Wye in Brecknockshire and Kington in Herefordshire.

==== Local boards of health ====
There were no town councils in the county until 1850, when a local board was formed at Knighton. Similar bodies were later formed at Llandrindod Wells (originally named Trefonen) and Presteigne in 1891.

==== Sanitary districts ====
The Public Health Act 1875 divided England and Wales into sanitary districts, each governed by a sanitary authority. Instead of creating new bodies, existing local board districts became urban sanitary districts (USDs) and the remaining areas of poor law unions became rural sanitary districts (RSDs). The existing local board or poor law guardians became the sanitary authority for their area. By 1891 therefore, Radnorshire was divided between the following sanitary districts:

- Builth RSD (part)
- Hay RSD (part)
- Kington RSD (Part)
- Knighton RSD
- Knighton USD
- Llandrindod Wells USD
- Presteigne RSD (dissolved in 1877, with parishes redistributed to Kington and Knighton RSDs)
- Presteigne USD
- Rhayader RSD

==== Urban and rural districts ====
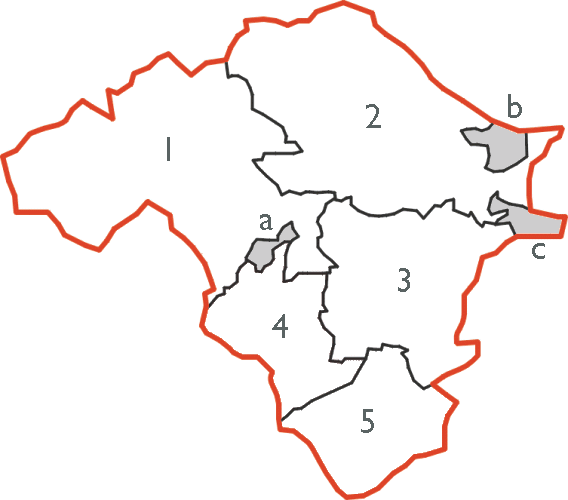
Urban and rural districts of Radnorshire 1894 - 1974: a) Llandrindod Wells UD, b) Knighton UD, c) Presteigne UD, 1) Rhayader RD, 2) Knighton RD 3) New Radnor RD, 4) Colwyn RD, 5) Painscastle RD

The Local Government Act 1894 created urban districts (UDs) and rural districts (RDs) in place of the sanitary districts. Directly elected urban and rural district councils became the governing bodies. The new districts were identical to the sanitary districts, with the exception that where a RSD was divided by a county boundary it was split into separate rural district in each county. Radnorshire was divided into eight UDs and RDs, which were unchanged until their abolition in 1974:

- Colwyn RD (from Builth RSD)
- Knighton RD
- Knighton UD
- Llandrindod Wells UD
- New Radnor RD (from Kington RSD)
- Painscastle RD (from Hay RSD)
- Presteigne UD
- Rhayader RD

==== Civil parishes ====
From the medieval period until 1974, Radnorshire was divided into civil parishes for the purpose of local government; these in large part equated to ecclesiastical parishes (see the table below), most of which still exist as part of the Church in Wales. Chapelries are listed in italics.

Hundred	Parishes
Cefnllys	Bleddfa/Blethva • Cefnllys/Kevenlleece • Llanbadarn Fawr/Llanbadarn Vawr • Llandeglau/Llandegley • Llandrindod • Llanfihangel Rhydithon/Llanvihangel Rhydithon • Llangunllo • Pwll-y-Llethr/Pilleth • Whitton/Llanddewi-yn-Hwytyn
Colwyn	Aberedw • Betws Diserth/Bettws Disserth • Craig Furuna/Cregrina • Diserth/Disserth • Glascwm/Glascomb • Llanbadarn y Garreg • Llanelwedd/Llanelweth • Llanfaredd/Llanvareth • Llansanffraid-yn-Elfael/Llansantfraid-in-Elwell • Rhiwlen/Rhulen
Knighton	Abaty Cwm Hir/Abbeycwmhir • Bugeildy/Beguildy • Heyop/Llanddewi-yn-Heiob • Knighton/Trefyclawdd • Llananno/Llanano • Llanbadarn Fynydd/Llanbadarn Vynydd • Llanbister • Llanddewi Ystradennau/Llanddewi Ystradenny
Painscastle	Bochrwd/Boughrood • Bryngwyn • Cleirwy/Clyro (Bettws Clyro) • Llanbedr Castell-paen/Llanbedr Painscastle • Llanddewi Fach/Llanddewi Vach • Llandeilo Graban • Llanfihangel Dyffryn Arwy/Michaelchurch-on-Arrow • Llannewydd/Newchurch • Llansteffan/Llanstephan • Llowes • Y Clas-ar-Wy/Glasbury
Radnor	Casgob/Cascob • Colfa/Colva • Llanandras/Presteigne • Llanfair Llythynwg/Gladestry • Llanfihangel Nant Melan/Llanvihangel Nant Melan • New Radnor/Maesyfed • Norton/Nortyn • Old Radnor/Pencraig
Rhayader	Llanarmon/St Harmon • Llanfihangel Helygen/Llanvihangel Helygen • Llanllŷr/Llanyre • Llansanffraid Cwmddeudwr/Llansantfraid Cwm Toyddwr • Nantmael/Nantmel • Rhaeadr/Rhayader

=== Premises ===
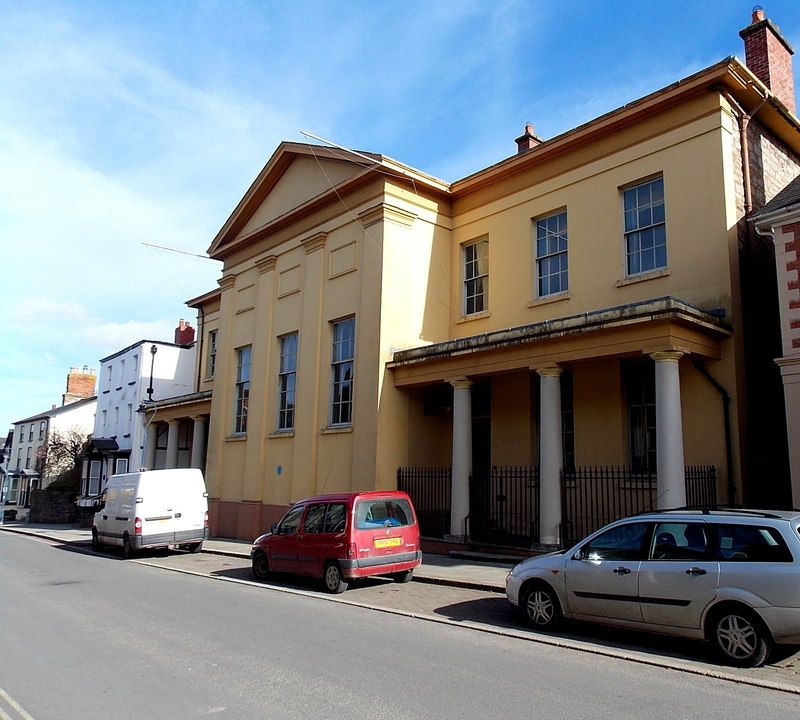
Shire Hall, Presteigne

Prior to the creation of Radnorshire County Council in 1889, the county was administered by its court of quarter sessions, which initially alternated between New Radnor and Rhayader, then between New Radnor and Presteigne, before settling at Presteigne alone. A Shire Hall was built in Presteigne in 1542 and rebuilt in 1829, which served as the main administrative building for the county. When the county council was established, during preliminary meetings before the council formally came into being on 1 April 1889, it was decided by 12 votes to 11 that the county council would not meet at Presteigne but in Llandrindod Wells. The Shire Hall in Presteigne continued to serve as a courthouse until the 1990s.

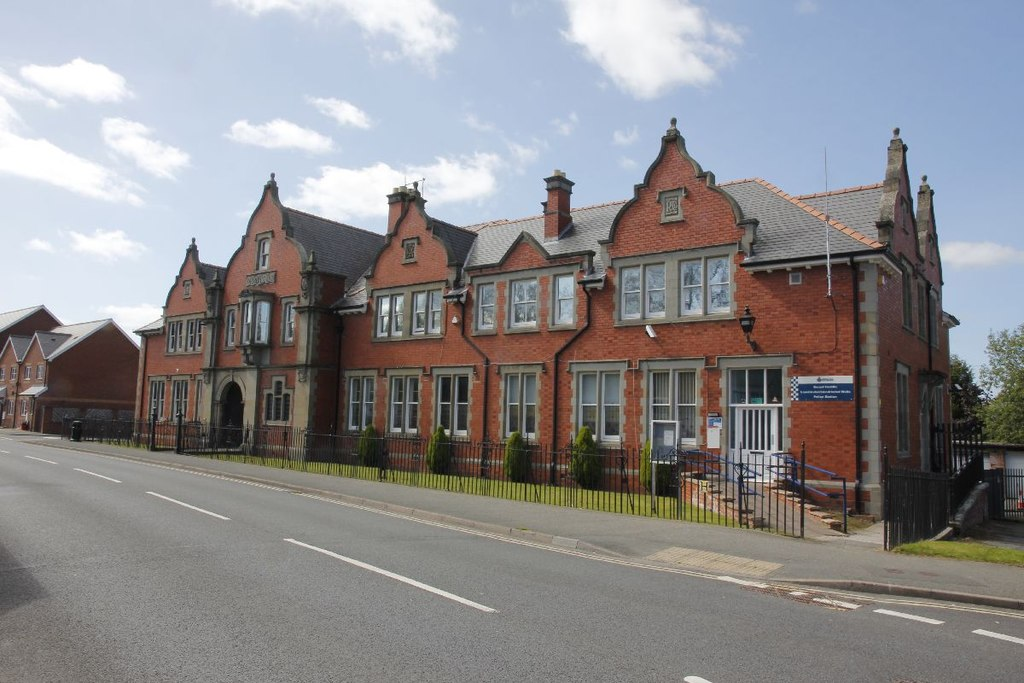
County Buildings, Llandrindod Wells: County Council's headquarters 1909–1950

The county council generally held its meetings at the Pump House Hotel on Spa Road East in Llandrindod Wells. In 1909 the county council built itself offices at the "County Buildings" in the High Street at Llandrindod Wells.

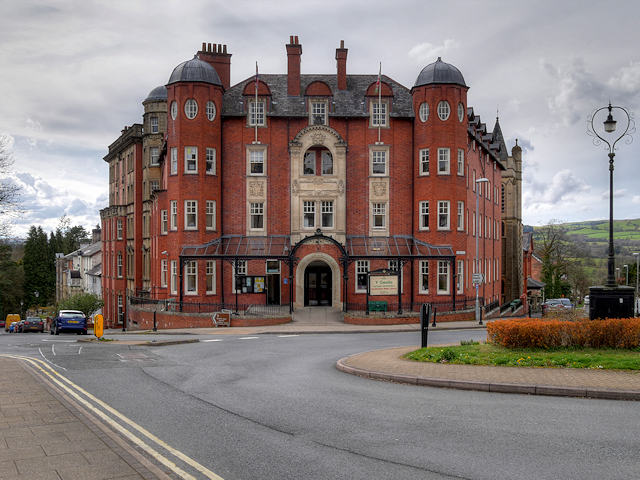
The former Gwalia Hotel in Ithon Road, Llandrindod Wells: headquarters of Radnorshire County Council from 1950 to 1974

The county council then moved its staff to larger offices at the former Gwalia Hotel in Ithon Road in 1950. The former hotel remained the county council headquarters until the county council was abolished in 1974.

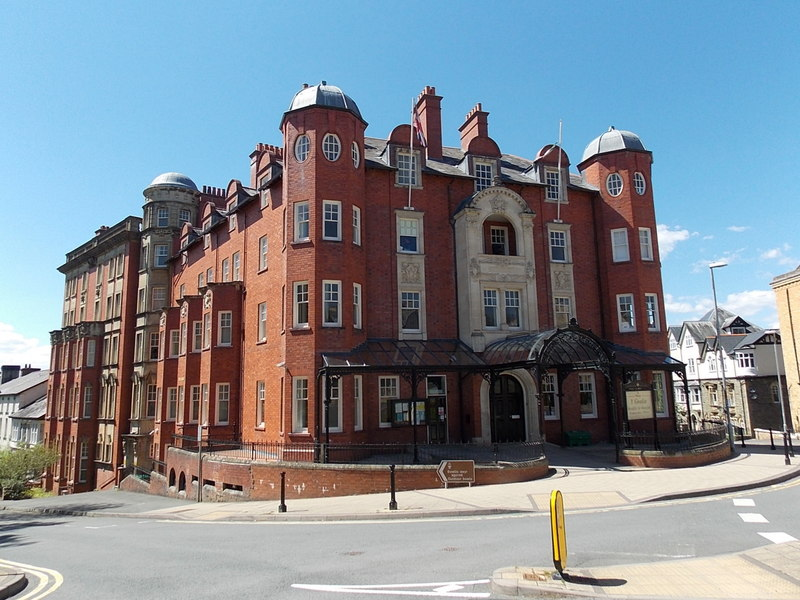
The Gwalia, Ithon Road, Llandrindod Wells

The district council was based at The Gwalia, on Ithon Road in Llandrindod Wells, which had been built in 1900 as the Gwalia Hotel and had served as the offices of the old Radnorshire County Council since 1950. After the council's abolition The Gwalia became an area office for Powys County Council.

== Coat of arms ==
Until 1954 Radnorshire County Council used a version of the arms of the Mortimers, Earls of March: Barry of six or and azure on a chief of the last two pallets azure between as may gyrons of the first. The council received a grant of armorial bearings by the College of Arms in 1954. The arms were made up of charges from local families. A gold reguardant lion on red was for Elystan Glodrhydd, Prince of Wales c. 1000; black boars' heads on white for his son Cadwgan. Around these was placed a gold and blue compony bordure based on the Mortimer arms. The motto adopted by the county council was Ewch yn Uwch ("Go Higher"). In 1974 the arms were transferred to Radnor District Council. In 1996 the arms were transferred a second time to Powys County Council, for use by the Radnorshire Shire Committee.

== Political control ==
The first election to the district council was held in 1973, initially operating as a shadow authority before coming into its powers on 1 April 1974. A majority of the seats on the district council were held by independents throughout the council's existence.

Party in control	Years
Independent	1974–1996

== Places of special interest ==
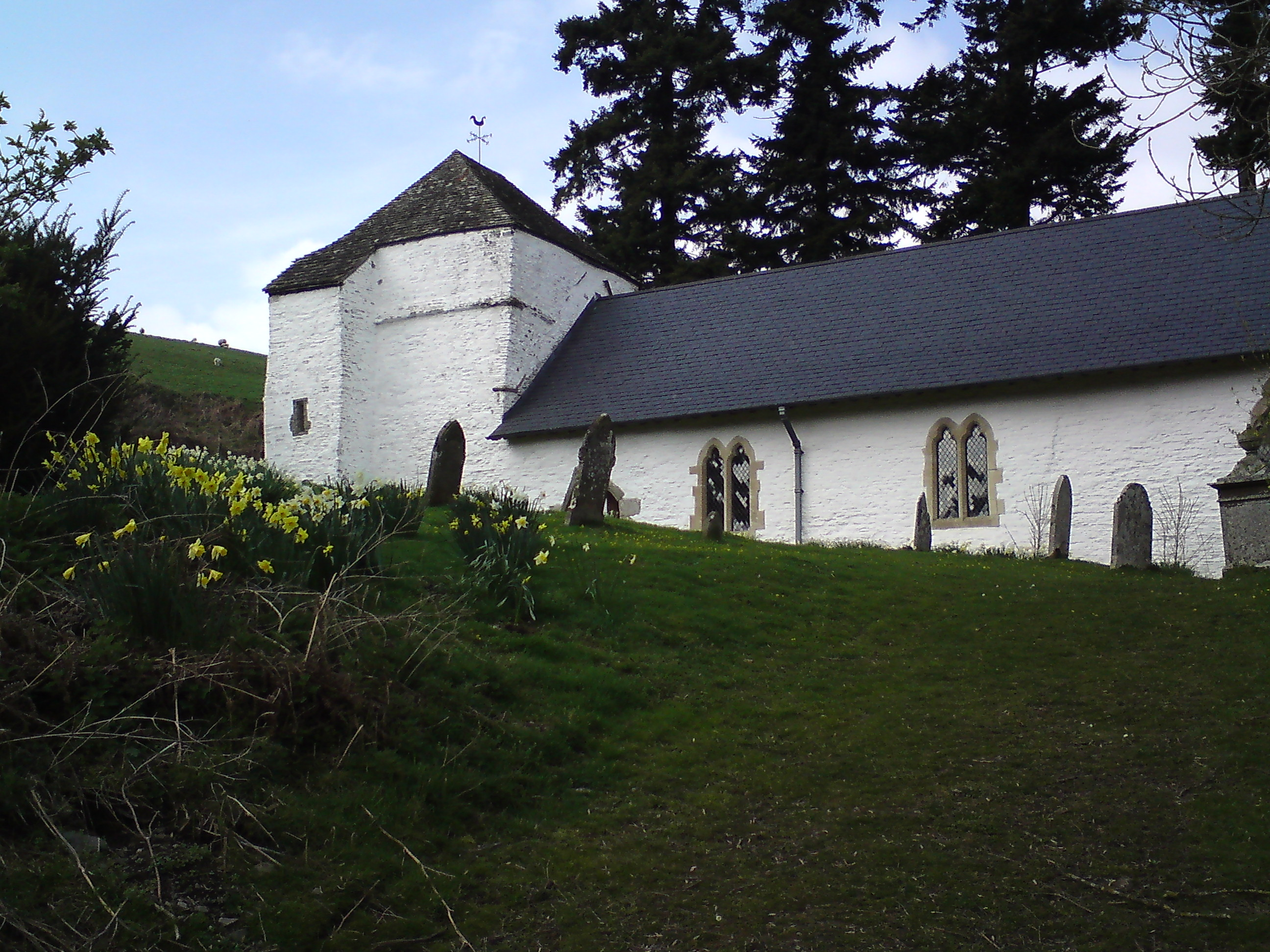
St Mary's Church, Pilleth

- Abbey Cwmhir aka Abbeycwmhir (SO0571);
- Beguildy Tumuli (SO176767);
- Broadheath House, Presteigne (SO3363);
- Elan Valley Visitor's Centre (SN927646);
- The Pales (SO138641);
- Offa's Dyke (SO2763, SO2872);
- The Rock Park, Llandrindod Wells (SO052609).
- Royal Welsh Showground, Llanelwedd
- Radnor Forest
- Stanner Rocks Nature Reserve site of the Radnor Lilly Gagea bohemica.
- Pilleth Church and the Battle of Bryn Glas
- Scheduled prehistoric monuments in Radnorshire
- Scheduled Roman to modern monuments in Radnorshire

== Principal towns and villages ==
No centre in Radnorshire exceeds a population of 6,000; only one (Llandrindod Wells) exceeds 5,000:

- Knighton
- Llandrindod Wells
- Presteigne
- Rhayader
- Newbridge on Wye
- New Radnor

== Culture and community ==
The Radnorshire Society was established in 1930 to promote the study of the archaeology and history of the county.

The Royal Welsh Show takes place each July at the Royal Welsh Agricultural Showground at Llanelwedd. The show lasts for four days and attracts more than 200,000 visitors annually.

Radnor Young Farmers Club has 13 clubs throughout the county. It is affiliated to the National Federation of Young Farmers Clubs.

Radnorshire Arts and Crafts Foundation, Museum of Welsh Textiles Whitton, Powys

The Radnorshire Museum website, in Llandrindod Wells, collects, preserves and interprets the rich cultural heritage of Radnorshire. This is reflected in its diverse collections of Geology, Palaeontology, Archaeology, Natural History, Social History and Fine Art.

The Radnorshire Wildlife Trust manages 17 nature reserves across the county.

The Llandrindod Wells Victorian Festival is held annually at the end of August. It offers open-air and street theatre and music, a fairground, craft fair, historical re-enactment, entertainments at the Albert Hall and exhibitions of old items.

== Notable people ==
- Eleanor Bufton (b. Llanbister 1842 – d. London 1893), actress, spent most of her career in London, playing in Shakespeare, Victorian burlesque, and a range of drama and comedy roles.
- John Corrie Carter (b. Birmingham 1839 – d. Rhayader 1927), barrister, author, sportsman, High Sheriff
- Chaz Davies (b. Knighton 1987), motorcycle racer, 2011 World Supersport champion and 2011 BBC Wales Sports Personality of the Year.
- Thomas Jones (b. Cefnllys 1742 - d 1803), landscape painter, broke with the conventions of classical landscape painting in favour of direct observation.
- Sir Harford Jones-Brydges (b. Presteigne 1764 - d. Presteigne 1847), diplomat and author, lifelong interest in the welfare of the Persians and the natives of India.
- Emmeline Lewis Lloyd (b. Nantgwyllt 1827 - d. London 1913), alpine mountaineer, first woman to climb Monte Viso.

== Radnorshire diaspora ==
Poverty and agricultural change, decline and industrial progress elsewhere has always made Radnorshire a place of net emigration. Emigrants employed the name of the county in the United States:

- Radnor Lake State Park, Nashville, Tennessee
- Radnor Township, Delaware County, Pennsylvania. Part of the Welsh Tract first settled in 1682–1685 by a group of 40 Quakers from Radnorshire.
- Radnor Township, Delaware County, Ohio

Others may have formed part of the Welsh community in Patagonia.

== See also ==
- List of Lord Lieutenants of Radnorshire
- List of High Sheriffs of Radnorshire
- Custos Rotulorum of Radnorshire - Keeper of the Rolls
- Radnorshire (UK Parliament constituency) - A list of MPs for Radnorshire constituency
- Red Kite feeding in Wales
- Heart of Wales Line
