= Erwood transmitting station =

Erwood
- Location within Powys
- Mast height: 20 metres (66 ft)
- Coordinates: 52.076498°N 3.329951°W
- Grid reference: SO089428
- Built: 1980's
- Relay of: Carmel
- BBC region: BBC Wales
- ITV region: ITV Cymru Wales

The Erwood television relay station is sited on high ground to the west of the village of Erwood in Powys, south Wales. It was originally built in the 1980s as a fill-in relay for UHF analogue colour television covering the communities of Erwood, Llandeilo Graban and Llansteffan. It consists of a 20 m self-supporting lattice steel mast standing on a hillside which is itself about 215 m above sea level. The transmissions are beamed northeast and southeast to cover its targets. The Erwood transmission station is owned and operated by Arqiva.

Erwood transmitter re-radiates the signal received off-air from Llandrindod Wells which is itself an off-air relay of Carmel about 40 km to the west. When it came, the digital switchover process for Erwood duplicated the timing at Carmel with the first stage taking place on 26 August 2009 and with the second stage being completed on 23 September 2009. After the switchover process, analogue channels had ceased broadcasting permanently and the Freeview digital TV services were radiated at an ERP of 2 W each.

== Channels listed by frequency ==
=== Analogue television ===
==== 1980's - 26 August 2009 ====
Being in Wales, Erwood transmitted the S4C variant of Channel 4.

Frequency	UHF	kW	Service
727.25 MHz	53	0.008	S4C
759.25 MHz	57	0.008	BBC One Wales
783.25 MHz	60	0.008	ITV1 Wales (HTV Wales until 2002)
807.25 MHz	63	0.008	BBC Two Wales

=== Analogue and digital television ===
==== 26 August 2009 - 23 September 2009 ====
The UK's digital switchover commenced at Carmel (and therefore at Erwood and all its other relays) on 26 August 2009. Analogue BBC Two Wales on channel 63 was first to close, and ITV Wales was moved from channel 60 to channel 63 for its last month of service. Channel 60 was replaced by the new digital BBC A mux which started up in 64-QAM and at full power (i.e. 2 W).

Frequency	UHF	kW	Service	System
727.25 MHz	53	0.008	S4C	PAL System I
759.25 MHz	57	0.008	BBC One Wales	PAL System I
786.000 MHz	60	0.002	BBC A	DVB-T
807.25 MHz	63	0.008	ITV1 Wales (HTV Wales until 2002)	PAL System I

=== Digital television ===
==== 23 September 2009 - present ====
The remaining analogue TV services were closed down and the digital multiplexes took over on the original analogue channels' frequencies.

Frequency	UHF	kW	Operator
730.000 MHz	53	0.002	Digital 3&4
762.000 MHz	57	0.002	BBC B
786.000 MHz	60	0.002	BBC A
