= Llanbadarn =

Llanbadarn may refer to:

- Llanbadarn Fawr, Ceredigion, a community in Ceredigion, Wales
- Llanbadarn Fawr, Powys, a community in Powys, Wales
- Llanbadarn Fynydd, a community in Powys, Wales
- Llanbadarn Trefeglwys, a village in Ceredigion, Wales
- Llanbadarn y Garreg, a village in Powys, Wales
