= Aberedw railway station =

Disused railway station in Aberedw, Powys

Aberedw
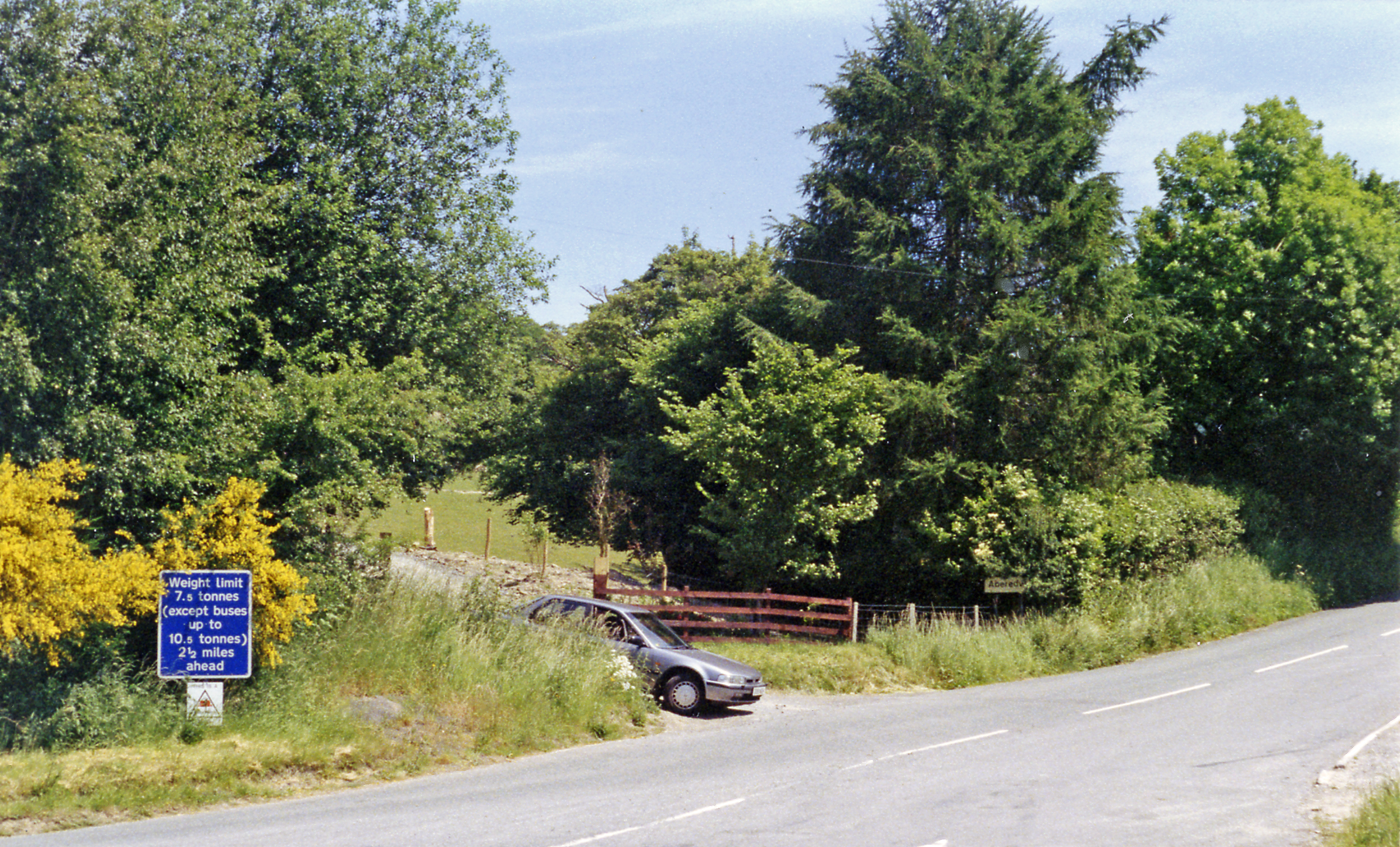
- Location of the former station (1994)

General information
- Location: Aberedw, Powys; Wales
- Coordinates: 52.1187°N 3.3518°W
- Grid reference: SO074476
- Platforms: 1

Other information
- Status: Disused

History
- Original company: Mid Wales Railway
- Pre-grouping: Cambrian Railways
- Post-grouping: Great Western Railway

Key dates
- 1867: Opened
- 31 December 1962: Closed
Location

Aberedw railway station served the village of Aberedw in Powys, Wales. Aberedw Castle was demolished to build the station and some of the stone from the castle was used as track ballast.

== History ==
Opened by the Mid Wales Railway, then operated by the Cambrian Railways, it became part of the Great Western Railway. Passing on to the Western Region of British Railways on nationalisation in 1948, it was then closed by the British Transport Commission.

Author Shaun Sewell quotes a diarist as writing about the station, in 1877, that the reader should "Please imagine a wooden hut about 12 feet long ... divided by a partition ... and he will have a very good idea of Aberedw Railway Station".

Preceding station	Disused railways	Following station
Llanferedd Halt; Line and station closed	Cambrian Railways; Mid-Wales Railway	Erwood; Line and station closed
