= Kathryn Brown (climate policy advisor) =

British scientist

Kathryn Brown OBE is Director of Climate Change and Evidence at The Wildlife Trusts.

Brown has a degree in Natural Sciences from the University of Cambridge, a masters in International Development from University College London and was a research fellow at Imperial College London. She worked for 10 years at Defra as a Senior Scientific Officer on climate change adaptation evidence and carbon budgets . She worked for The Climate Change Committee (CCC) advising the UK Government. She led the production of progress reports to Parliament and government, on topics of health, biodiversity, climate emergency planning, agriculture, water and forestry including the Independent Assessment of UK Climate Risk which includes extensive analysis of evidence gathered by the Committee from 130 organisations.

She was awarded an OBE for her services to climate change research in the New Year's Honours list in 2022.
