= Rhos Goch National Nature Reserve =

Nature reserve on the England/Wales border

Coordinates: 52°07′37″N 3°10′41″W

Rhos Goch National Nature Reserve, located near Painscastle on the England/Wales border, is one of the largest raised bogs in mid and south Wales.

‘Goch’ is Welsh for ‘red’, and in autumn the bog accordingly becomes a stunning carpet of red and gold. Many birds and insects love the reserve's diverse and little-disturbed habitats. Curlew and lapwing feed here in the winter, and in summer the swamp is alive with the calls of the willow warbler and reed bunting, the air shimmering with dragonflies and damselflies.
