= The Begwns =

Area in Powys, Wales

Coordinates: 52.09048°N 3.227193°W

The Begwns (Powys)
The Begwns (Wales)

The Begwns, or sometimes The Begwyns, form a small upland area in eastern Powys, Wales. They sit within the communities of Painscastle, Glasbury and Clyro, to the north of a great bend in the course of the Wye valley, west of Hay-on-Wye. ‘Begwns' is a cymricisation of the English ‘beacons’. The Begwns are 1293 acres of common land which was given to the National Trust by the Maesllwch Estate in 1992 and managed for grazing and quiet recreation. The common ranges in elevation from 250m at its lowest to 415m at ‘The Roundabout’, a hilltop wooded feature at the heart of the area. A trig point immediately outside of this enclosure is 1m lower. The trees were planted here to commemorate Queen Victoria's Diamond Jubilee with a wall constructed around them in 1887 for protection.

There are a handful of small pools on the common, of which the largest is Monks Pond. These ponds contain the increasingly uncommon aquatic fern, pillwort and other uncommon pond plants like tubular water-dropwort. Numerous springs feed streams which run both north to a small river known as the Bachawy, a left-bank tributary of the Wye, and to the south, directly into the Wye.

== Access ==
The Begwns are crossed by a number of public footpaths and bridleways though the entire area is mapped as open access providing free access to walkers across all of the land. There are in addition a handful of tarmacked minor public roads cut across the common, together with a number of unmetalled highways shown on Ordnance Survey maps as ‘other routes with public access’ (ORPAs).

== Geology ==
The larger part of the Begwns is formed by the Pridoli age siltstones and mudstones of the Raglan Mudstone Formation, the lowermost unit of the Old Red Sandstone (commonly reduced to 'ORS'). The ORS characterises the landscape of the Brecon Beacons National Park which is seen to the south from the Begwns. A number of sandstone bands are traced across the slopes of the common.

The lower northern slopes of the Begwns are formed from similar rocks dating from the Wenlockian and Ludlovian epochs of the Silurian period. A handful of north–south aligned normal faults cut these rocks with downthrows to the east in the east and to the west in the west. The entire range lies within a block defined by the Church Stretton Fault Zone to the northwest and the Swansea Valley Disturbance to the southeast. Some isolated patches of peat have been mapped as have some small areas of head consisting of pebbly sand, silt and clay.

== Archaeology ==
There are a number of scheduled ancient monuments in the area amongst which are Maesgwyn mound, a presumed Bronze Age ritual site, a round cairn to the north of the roundabout and nearby is a probable Bronze Age standing stone An extensive mediaeval settlement has been identified at Pentre Jack at the western end of the common.
