= Stephanie Hilborne =

British conservationist (born 1968)

Stephanie Hilborne OBE
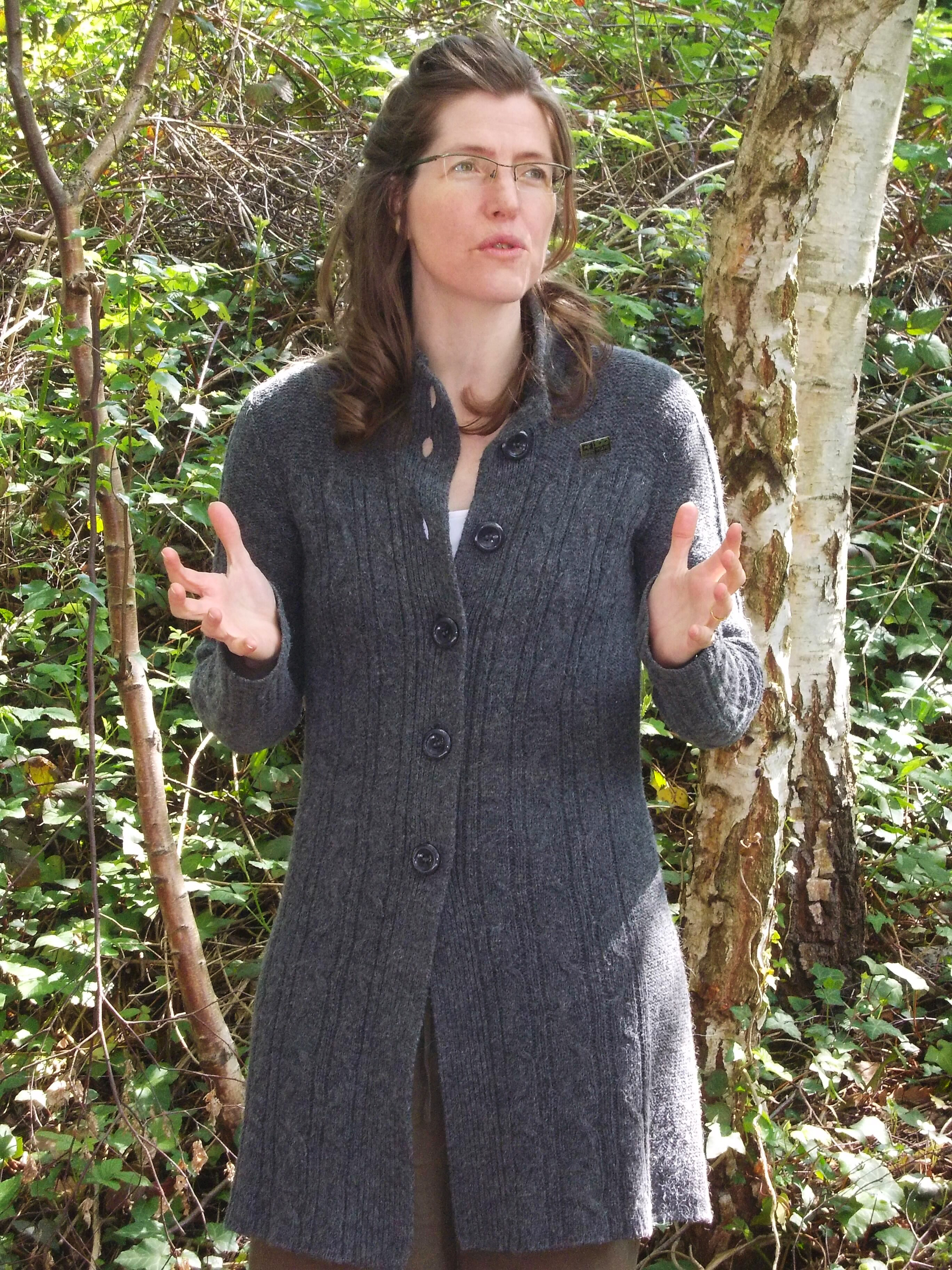
- Born: 3 March 1968
- Education: Bristol University, University College London
- Awards: OBE
- Scientific career
- Fields: Nature conservation
- Workplaces: Women in Sport; The Wildlife Trusts

External videos
- “Stephanie Hilborne on the launch of the Natural Environment White Paper”, The Wildlife Trusts, June 7, 2011

Stephanie Vera Hilborne OBE (born 3 March 1968) is a British scientist and the CEO of Women in Sport.

== Education ==
Hilborne has a first class degree in Biology (1990) and an honorary doctorate in science (2015) from Bristol University. She earned a Master's in Biology and Conservation from University College London in 1992.

== Career ==
As of 2010, Hilborne joined the board of trustees of the UK Green Building Council. She later became vice chair of the UK Green Building Council.

She joined the Wildlife and Countryside Link, a national coalition of environmental organizations, in 1998. In 2000 she joined the Nottinghamshire Wildlife Trust, serving as its chief executive from 2000-2004. In 2004, she became chief executive of The Wildlife Trust, a collective of the 47 local Wildlife Trusts. As a group in 2015, it manages 2,300 wildlife reserves, with over 2,000 staff, 35,000 volunteers and 800,000 members.

Hilborne has been successful in campaigning for the Marine and Coastal Access Act (2009); contributing to Sir John Lawton's review, which was published as Making Space for Nature (2010); and working on a White Paper on the Natural Environment (2011). The White Paper pledged that the Conservative Party would be “the first generation to leave the environment in a better state than it found it”.

Hilborne was one of the members of an independent panel on forestry which was formed in December 2010 and reported on 4 July 2012. Hilborne served on the Smarter Environmental Regulation Review of the Department for Environment, Food and Rural Affairs in 2014-2015.

She was chief executive of The Wildlife Trusts from 2004 to 2019. She became the CEO of Women in Sport in 2019.

== Honours ==
Hilborne was appointed an Officer of the Order of the British Empire (OBE) in the 2010 New Year Honours for services to nature conservation.
