= Neighbourhoods Green =

English partnership initiative between landlords and housing associations

Neighbourhoods Green is an English partnership initiative which works with social landlords and housing associations to highlight the importance of open and green space for residents and raise the overall quality of design and management with these groups.

== History and governance ==
The partnership was established in 2003 when Peabody Trust and Notting Hill Housing Group held a conference which identified the need to raise the profile of the green and open spaces owned and managed by social landlords. The scheme attracted praise from the then Minister for parks and green spaces Yvette Cooper.

Since 2003 the partnership has expanded to include National Housing Federation, Groundwork, The Wildlife Trusts, Landscape Institute, Green Flag Award, Royal Horticultural Society, Natural England and CABE. It is overseen by a steering group which includes representatives from Circle Housing Group, Great Places Housing Group, Helena Homes, London Borough of Hammersmith & Fulham, Medina Housing, New Charter Housing Trust, Notting Hill Housing, Peabody Trust, Places for People, Regenda Group and Wakefield & District Housing.

== Work ==
Neighbourhoods Green has three main areas of emphasis. It produces best practice guidance, highlighting the contribution parks, gardens and play areas make to the quality of life for residents – including the mitigation of climate change, promotion of biodiversity and aesthetic qualities. It also generates a number of case studies from housing associations and community groups and offers training for landlords, residents and partners on areas such as playspace, green infrastructure and growing food.

In 2011, working in conjunction with University of Sheffield and the National Housing Federation, Neighbourhoods Green produced Greener Neighbourhoods a best practice guide to managing green space for social housing. Its ten principles for housing green space were:

- Commit to quality
- Involve residents
- Know the bigger picture
- Make the best use of funding
- Design for local people
- Develop training and skills
- Maintain high standards
- Make places feel safe
- Promote healthy living
- Prepare for climate change

During 2013/14 Neighbourhoods Green will be working with Keep Britain Tidy to support the expansion of the Green Flag Award into the social housing sector.
