= Llanfaredd Halt railway station =

Former railway station in Wales

Llanfaredd Halt

General information
- Location: East of Builth Wells, Powys; Wales
- Coordinates: 52.1468°N 3.3633°W
- Grid reference: SO067507
- Platforms: 1

Other information
- Status: Disused

History
- Original company: Great Western Railway
- Post-grouping: Great Western Railway

Key dates
- 7 May 1934: opened
- 1962: Closed
Location

Llanfaredd Halt railway station was an unstaffed railway station opened by the Great Western Railway on 7 May 1934 on the old Mid-Wales line between Builth Wells railway station and Aberedw railway station in Powys, Wales.

The rarely used station consisted of a small wooden platform and shelter, on the eastern side of the single line. After closure on 31 December 1962 the station was demolished and station area and trackbed has been levelled into a field. Not far away was a spur to the Builth Stone quarries.

Preceding station	Disused railways	Following station
Builth Wells; Line and station closed	Great Western Railway; Mid-Wales Railway	Aberedw; Line and station closed
