= The Wildlife Trusts =

Wildlife and nature charity in United Kingdom

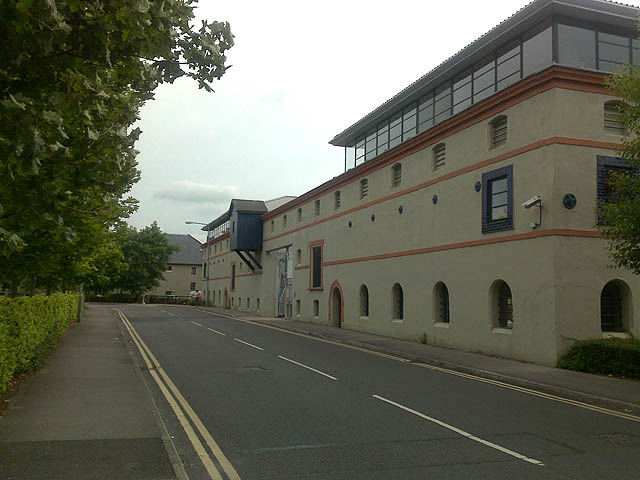
- The Wildlife Trusts headquarters in Newark-on-Trent
- Predecessor: The Society for the Promotion of Nature Reserves
- Formation: 1912; 114 years ago
- Type: Charitable trust
- Registration no.: 207238
- Location: Newark-on-Trent, Nottinghamshire, United Kingdom
- President: Liz Bonnin
- Chairman: Duncan Ingram
- Chief Executive: Craig Bennett
- Website: www.wildlifetrusts.org

The Wildlife Trusts (trading name), formally the Royal Society of Wildlife Trusts, is an organisation made up of 46 local Wildlife Trusts in the United Kingdom, the Isle of Man and Alderney. The Wildlife Trusts, between them, look after more than 2,600 nature reserves, covering around 112,000 hectares (280,000 acres) of land and 10,120km of watercourse. As of 2025, the Trusts have a combined membership of over 945,800 members.

The Royal Society of Wildlife Trusts (RSWT) is an independent charity, with a membership formed of the 46 individual charitable Trusts. It acts as an umbrella group for the individual Wildlife Trusts, as well as operating a separate Grants Unit which administers a number of funds.

King Charles III serves as the patron of the Wildlife Trusts. David Bellamy was president of The Wildlife Trusts for ten years between 1995 and 2005, and was succeeded by Aubrey Manning. Sir David Attenborough, Simon King and Tony Juniper are all Presidents Emeritus. Stephanie Hilborne OBE was chief executive for 15 years, and left in October 2019. Craig Bennett became CEO from April 6, 2020.

== Activities ==
Wildlife Trusts are local organisations of differing size, history and origins, and can vary greatly in their constitution, activities and membership. However, all Wildlife Trusts share a common interest in wildlife and biodiversity, rooted in a practical tradition of land management and conservation. Almost all Wildlife Trusts are significant landowners, with many nature reserves. Collectively they are the third largest voluntary sector landowners in the UK. They often have extensive educational activities, and programmes of public events and education. The Wildlife Trusts centrally and locally also lobby for better protection of the UK's natural heritage, by becoming involved in planning matters and by national campaigning through the Royal Society of Wildlife Trusts. The Trusts rely heavily upon volunteer labour for many of their activities, but nevertheless employ significant numbers of staff in countryside management and education. Thanks to their work promoting the personal and social development of young people, The Wildlife Trusts is a member of The National Council for Voluntary Youth Services (NCVYS).

The Wildlife Trusts offer a Biodiversity Benchmark scheme through which companies can be assessed and recognised for their contribution to biodiversity. The assessment covers the organisation's performance under the headings of "Commitment, Planning, Implementation, and Monitoring and Review".

The Wildlife Trusts are one of the steering group partners of Neighbourhoods Green, a partnership initiative which works with social landlords and housing associations to highlight the importance of, and raise the overall quality of design and management for, open and green space in social housing.

Kathryn Brown OBE was appointed as the charity’s first director of climate action in January 2022.

== History ==
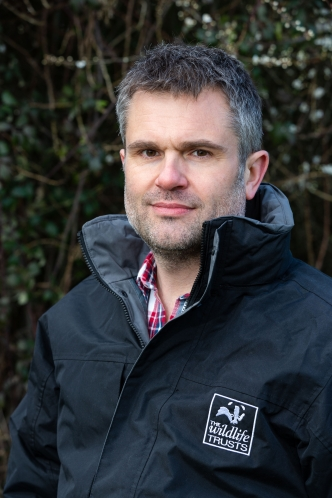
Craig Bennett, Chief executive officer, 2020

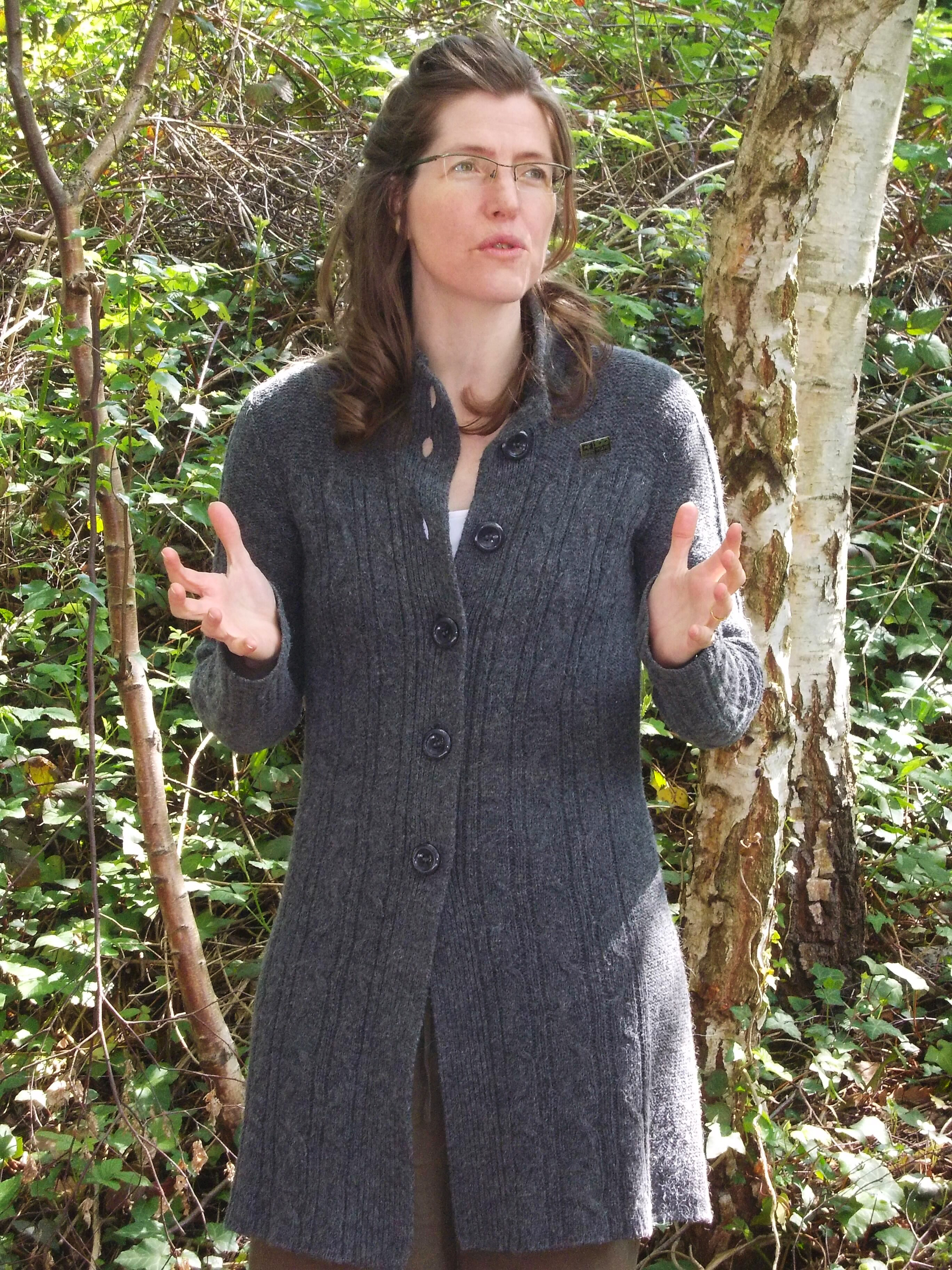
Stephanie Hilborne, ex-chief executive officer, celebrating the centenary of the Wildlife Trusts at Gunnersbury Triangle local nature reserve, 2012

Today's Wildlife Trust movement began life as The Society for the Promotion of Nature Reserves (SPNR), which was formed by Charles Rothschild in 1912. It aimed initially to draw up a list of the country's best wildlife sites with a view to purchase for protection as nature reserves, and by 1915 it had drawn up a list of 284 (including the Farne Islands and the Norfolk Broads), known as Rothschild Reserves. During the early years, membership tended to be made up of specialist naturalists and its growth was comparatively slow. The first independent Trust was formed in Norfolk in 1926 as the Norfolk Naturalists Trust, followed in 1938 by the Pembrokeshire Bird Protection Society which after several subsequent changes of name is now the Wildlife Trust of South and West Wales and it was not until the 1940s and 1950s that more Naturalists' Trusts were formed in Yorkshire (1946), Lincolnshire (1948), Leicestershire (1956) and Cambridgeshire (1956). These early Trusts tended to focus on purchasing land to establish nature reserves in the geographical areas they served.

Encouraged by the growing number of Trusts, the SPNR began in 1957 to discuss the possibility of forming a national federation of Naturalists' Trusts. Kent Naturalists Trust was established in 1958 with SPNR being active in encouraging its formation. In the following year the SPNR established the County Naturalists' Committee, which organised the first national conference for Naturalists' Trusts at Skegness in 1960. By 1964, the number of Trusts had increased to 36 and the Society for the Promotion of Nature Reserves had changed its name to The Society for the Promotion of Nature Conservation. In recognition of the movement's growing importance, its name was changed to The Royal Society for Nature Conservation in 1981.

The movement continued to develop throughout the 1970s, and, by the early 1980s, most of today's Trusts had been established. In 1980, the first urban Wildlife Trust (now the Wildlife Trust for Birmingham and the Black Country) was established in the West Midlands, rapidly followed by others in London, Bristol and Sheffield. This was a watershed for the movement that strengthened its focus on wildlife and people. It was during this period that some Trusts changed their names from Naturalist Societies to Trusts for Nature Conservation. In 2002 the group changed their name to The Royal Society of Wildlife Trusts. The badger logo was adopted by the movement to establish its common identity. Also in 2002, the newest wildlife trust was formed, in Alderney.

As the number of Trusts grew, so did their combined membership, from 3,000 in 1960 to 21,000 in 1965. Membership topped 100,000 in 1975, and in that year Wildlife Watch was launched as a children's naturalist club. By the late 1980s membership had reached 200,000, increasing to 260,000 in 1995, and over 500,000 by 2004. The combined membership for 2007 stood at 670,000 members, 108,000 belonging to the junior branch Wildlife Watch.

By 2012, membership was over 800,000, with over 150,000 Wildlife Watch members. As of 2025, the Trusts have a combined membership of over 945,800 members.

== List of Wildlife Trusts ==
- Alderney Wildlife Trust
- Avon Wildlife Trust
- Berkshire, Buckinghamshire and Oxfordshire Wildlife Trust
- Birmingham and the Black Country Wildlife Trust*
- Cheshire Wildlife Trust
- Cornwall Wildlife Trust
- Cumbria Wildlife Trust
- Derbyshire Wildlife Trust
- Devon Wildlife Trust
- Dorset Wildlife Trust
- Durham Wildlife Trust
- Essex Wildlife Trust
- Gloucestershire Wildlife Trust
- Gwent Wildlife Trust, Wales
- Hampshire and Isle of Wight Wildlife Trust
- Herefordshire Wildlife Trust
- Herts and Middlesex Wildlife Trust
- Isles of Scilly Wildlife Trust
- Kent Wildlife Trust
- Leicestershire and Rutland Wildlife Trust
- Lincolnshire Wildlife Trust
- London Wildlife Trust
- Manx Wildlife Trust / Treisht Bea-Feie Vannin
- Montgomeryshire Wildlife Trust
- Norfolk Wildlife Trust
- North Wales Wildlife Trust
- Northumberland Wildlife Trust
- Nottinghamshire Wildlife Trust
- Radnorshire Wildlife Trust
- Scottish Wildlife Trust
- Sheffield & Rotherham Wildlife Trust
- Shropshire Wildlife Trust
- Somerset Wildlife Trust
- Staffordshire Wildlife Trust
- Suffolk Wildlife Trust
- Surrey Wildlife Trust
- Sussex Wildlife Trust
- Tees Valley Wildlife Trust
- Wildlife Trust for Bedfordshire, Cambridgeshire and Northamptonshire
- Wildlife Trust for Birmingham and the Black Country
- Wildlife Trust for Lancashire, Manchester and North Merseyside
- Wildlife Trust of South and West Wales
- Ulster Wildlife Trust
- Warwickshire Wildlife Trust
- Wiltshire Wildlife Trust
- Worcestershire Wildlife Trust
- Yorkshire Wildlife Trust

== See also ==
- Conservation in the United Kingdom
- Index of conservation articles
