= Rhosgoch, Powys =

Village in Powys, Wales

Coordinates: 52.1220°N 3.1888°W

Rhosgoch
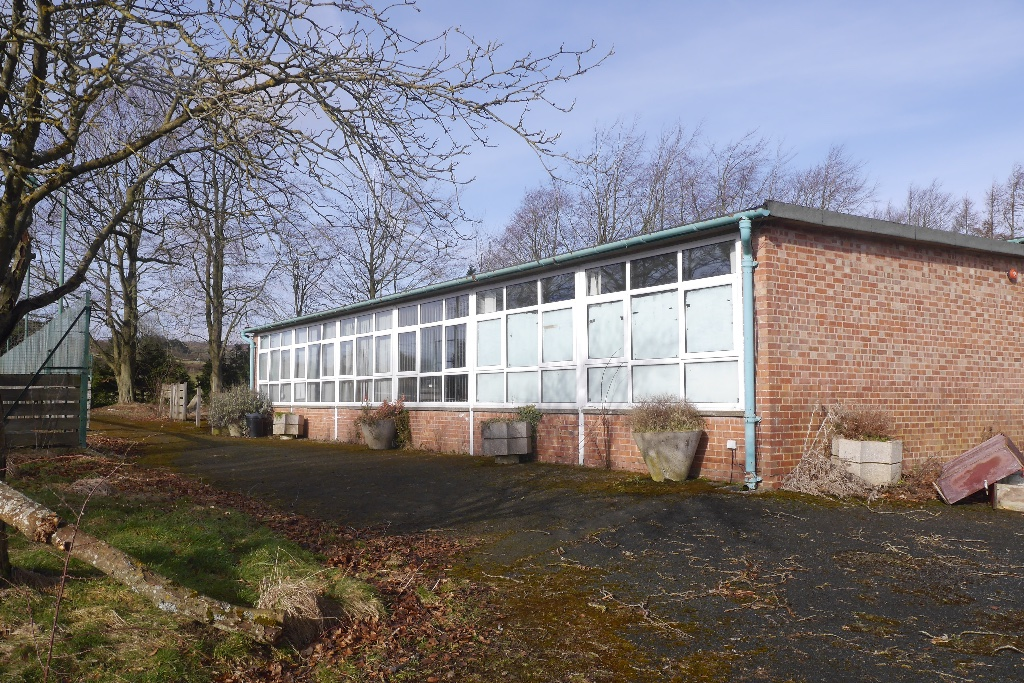
- Rhosgoch County Primary School

- Location within Powys
- Community: Painscastle
- Principal area: Powys
- Preserved county: Powys
- Country: Wales
- Sovereign state: United Kingdom
- Police: Dyfed-Powys
- Fire: Mid and West Wales
- Ambulance: Welsh
- UK Parliament: Brecon, Radnor and Cwm Tawe
- Senedd Cymru – Welsh Parliament: Brecon and Radnorshire

Rhosgoch is a village in the community of Painscastle, in Powys, Wales. It was historically in Radnorshire.

Hermon Congregational Chapel was founded in 1839 in the former parish of Llanbedr Painscastle and still has services as of 2026. Rhosgoch Mill is a Grade II listed building which was used until the 1950s and is still intact.

Powys County Council's attempt to close Rhosgoch County Primary School in 2013 was rejected by the Welsh Government. It had been intended that pupils would be transferred to Clyro Church in Wales School. It closed a year later in June 2014 and in 2023 it was up for sale for £150,000.

Rhosgoch Rangers was the village's football club from 1989 until it folded in 2015.
