= Natural England =

UK non-departmental public body

Agency overview
- Formed: 1 October 2006
- Jurisdiction: England
- Headquarters: York, England
- Employees: 2,577 (2023)
- Annual budget: £194 million (2015)
- Agency executives: Tony Juniper, chairman; Neil Hornby, chief executive
- Website: gov.uk/government/organisations/natural-england

Natural England is a non-departmental public body in the United Kingdom sponsored by the Department for Environment, Food and Rural Affairs. It is responsible for ensuring that England's natural environment, including its land, flora and fauna, freshwater and marine environments, geology and soils, are protected and enhanced. It also has a responsibility to help people enjoy, understand and access the natural environment.

Natural England focuses its activities and resources on four strategic outcomes:

- a healthy natural environment
- enjoyment of the natural environment
- sustainable use of the natural environment
- a secure environmental future

== Roles and responsibilities ==
As a non-departmental public body (NDPB), Natural England is independent of government. However, the Secretary of State for Environment, Food & Rural Affairs has the legal power to issue guidance to Natural England on various matters.

Its powers include defining ancient woodlands, awarding grants, designating Areas of Outstanding Natural Beauty and Sites of Special Scientific Interest, managing certain national nature reserves, overseeing access to open country and other recreation rights, and enforcing the associated regulations. It is also responsible for administering numerous grant schemes and frameworks that fund the development and conservation of the natural environment, for example environmental stewardship, the Countryside Stewardship Scheme, environmentally sensitive areas, and the Access to Nature Scheme.

Natural England's latest corporate plan sets out its goals and detailed objectives.

Natural England derives its finance, human resources and estates services from the Defra Shared Services organisation. Information technology services are outsourced to IBM.

== History ==
Natural England was established on 1 October 2006 by the Natural Environment and Rural Communities Act 2006, which implemented the recommendations of a rural review by Lord Haskins. It was formed by the amalgamation of three founder bodies:

- Countryside Agency, the landscape, access and recreation elements
- English Nature
- Rural Development Service, the environmental land management functions of Department for Environment, Food and Rural Affairs (Defra)

It received the powers of the founder bodies.

Natural England joined the 10:10 project in 2009 in a bid to reduce its own carbon footprint.

In 2008, Sir Martin Doughty, the chairman of Natural England, issued a warning to the prime minister concerning the potential dangers of genetically modified crops. However, in 2012, Poul Christensen, the next chairman of Natural England, said that middle England should embrace new technologies like GM crops as long as there were adequate testing and safeguards.

Following the 2008 financial crisis, as a public body, Natural England has been subject to a series of pay freezes and restrictions. The organisation was subject to the 2020 three-year pay freeze, which affected Natural England staff, who had experienced pay freezes and one per cent pay increases. Staff and Unions representing staff expressed concerns regarding the duration of these pay restraints and issues including equality and disparity between Public body pay increases.

In 2023, Natural England opposed its own planning application for a development on The Lizard peninsula in Cornwall.

== Activities ==
=== State of the Natural Environment ===
In May 2008, Natural England published a report, State of the Natural Environment, which brought together statistics and facts about England's environment. The report was intended to be used by environmental organisations as a benchmark and source for policy development. It complements reports on different topics produced by other organisations:

- on environmental facts and figures, by the Environment Agency
- on heritage counts, by the English Heritage
- on the state of the UK's birds, by the Royal Society for the Protection of Birds
- on the state of Britain's butterflies, by the Butterfly Conservation

=== Green exercise ===
Natural England funded eight pilot green exercise projects through local regional partnerships. These projects increased levels of physical activity and people's connections to their local green spaces. However, it was not clear whether these projects really changed people's long-term attitudes.

=== Green infrastructure ===
Natural England is promoting the concept of green infrastructure as a way of delivering a wide range of benefits for people and the natural environment together. It believes that green infrastructure should be delivered through the spatial planning system, as an integral part of new development everywhere, and also form a key part of proposals to regenerate existing urban areas.

Natural England is one of the steering group partners of Neighbourhoods Green, a green Infrastructure partnership initiative working with social landlords and housing associations to highlight the importance of open and green space in social housing and to improve the overall quality of design and management.

== Nutrient neutrality ==
In 2019 and 2020, NE found that housing development could have a negative impact on the environment in some rivers as sewage discharges would increase levels of nutrients, particularly nitrogen and phosphorus.

== Legal challenge ==
Natural England was challenged in the High Court in 2006 by Peter Boggis, a pensioner who was protecting his house from erosion. Natural England claimed that as the site of Boggis' house, at Easton Bavents north of Southwold on the Suffolk coast was a Site of Special Scientific Interest (SSSI), the protection went against the interests of the scientific community. Natural England lost the case in 2009, when Mr. Justice Blair ruled that Boggis' "human predicament" was more important than the site's SSSI status. Natural England won the subsequent appeal in October 2009.

== Firearms and wild bird control ==
On 23 April 2019, Natural England (NE) announced that it was revoking three general licences in England for the control of certain wild birds using firearms. The revocation was made without consultation or communication. These licences covered 16 species of birds including several species of crow, gull and pigeon, as well as with non-native species such as Canada goose and sacred ibis. Natural England made the decision following a legal challenge by the environmental group Wild Justice which questioned the legality of the general licences. As a result, farmers were temporarily unable to kill these species without applying for individual licences.

On 26 April 2019, NE issued the first of a series of replacement licences, covering the killing of carrion crows, and announced its intention to issue further licences in the coming weeks.

At NE's request, the Environment Secretary Michael Gove took over responsibility for the general licences from Natural England on 4 May 2019.

== See also ==
- Ancient woodland
- England Coast Path
- National Character Area
- National nature reserves in England
