= Ulster Wildlife =

Wildlife trust covering Northern Ireland

Ulster Wildlife is a wildlife trust and a registered charity covering Northern Ireland. It was formed in 1978. Ulster Wildlife is one of 46 trusts working primarily by county or region to make the UK a better place for people and wildlife. The Wildlife Trusts collectively have over 800,000 members, and are the largest UK voluntary organisation dedicated to conserving the full range of the UK's habitats and species, whether they be in the countryside, in cities or at sea. In total they manage over 2,300 nature reserves that cover more than 91,000 hectares across the whole of the UK, the Isle of Man and Alderney.

Ulster Wildlife (formerly called Ulster Wildlife Trust) manages their network of reserves across Northern Ireland. Their work also includes environmental education, working with land owners, companies and local communities to conserve the area in which they operate. Ulster Wildlife conservation activities are delivered under the twin strategic strands of Living Seas and Living Landscapes.
