= Groundwork UK =

British environmental organisation

Groundwork UK is an environmental organisation in the United Kingdom. It is based in Birmingham and is a registered charity under English law.

== History ==
In 1980, the Countryside Commission launched an initiative known as UFEX80. This was re-branded as "Operation Groundwork" in 1981, and the first Groundwork Trust came into being at St. Helens and Knowsley that year. The organisation has been known as Groundwork UK since then, within a federation of individual Groundwork Trusts.

== Priorities ==
Groundwork UK aims to improve the quality of life throughout the UK. Its priorities are people, places and prosperity, and it aims to build safer and stronger communities, to promote health and well-being, to support local economies, to promote environmental sustainability, to combat climate change, to provide young people with something to do, and to tackle unemployment.

It works locally, regionally and nationally, through public, private and voluntary partnerships in England, Wales and Northern Ireland.

Groundwork UK does not have any local trusts in Scotland, but it works with Scottish charities and agencies.

Groundwork is one of the steering group partners of Neighbourhoods Green, a partnership initiative that works with social landlords and housing associations to highlight the importance of, and raise the overall quality of design and management for, open and green space in social housing.

== Groundwork Trusts in the UK ==
- North West: Bury; Cheshire; Lancashire West & Wigan (created by merger 2015); Manchester, Salford, Stockport, Tameside & Trafford (created by merger July 2008); Merseyside; Oldham & Rochdale; Pennine Lancashire.
- Groundwork North East & Cumbria: Covering - County Durham, Northumberland, Middlesbrough, Stockton-On-Tees, Redcar and Cleveland, Hartlepool, Darlington, Sunderland and Cumbria.
- Northern Ireland.
- Yorkshire & The Humber: Creswell, Ashfield & Mansfield; Dearne Valley; Leeds; Selby; Sheffield; Wakefield.
- East Midlands: Newark & Sherwood; Creswell, Ashfield & Mansfield; Derby & Derbyshire; Greater Nottingham; Leicester & Leicestershire; Lincolnshire; North Northamptonshire.
- West Midlands: Birmingham & Solihull; Black Country; Coventry & Warwickshire; Stoke-on-Trent.
- Wales: Bridgend & Neath Port Talbot; Caerphilly; Merthyr & Rhondda Cynon Taff; Wrexham & Flintshire.
- East of England: Hertfordshire; Bedfordshire; Essex; Cambridgeshire; Suffolk; Norfolk.
- South West: Devon & Cornwall; Bristol; Dorset; Gloucestershire; Somerset; Wiltshire; Bath & North East Somerset; South Gloucestershire.
- South East: Thames Valley; Kent & Medway; Solent.
- London: East London; Merton; North London; Southwark and Lambeth; South East London; Thames Valley; West London.

== See also ==
- Environmental direct action in the United Kingdom
- Environmental issues in the United Kingdom
- United Kingdom environmental law
