= Battle of Bryn Glas =

1402 battle in Wales

Coordinates: 52.30681°N 3.09703°W

- Part of the Glyndŵr rebellion
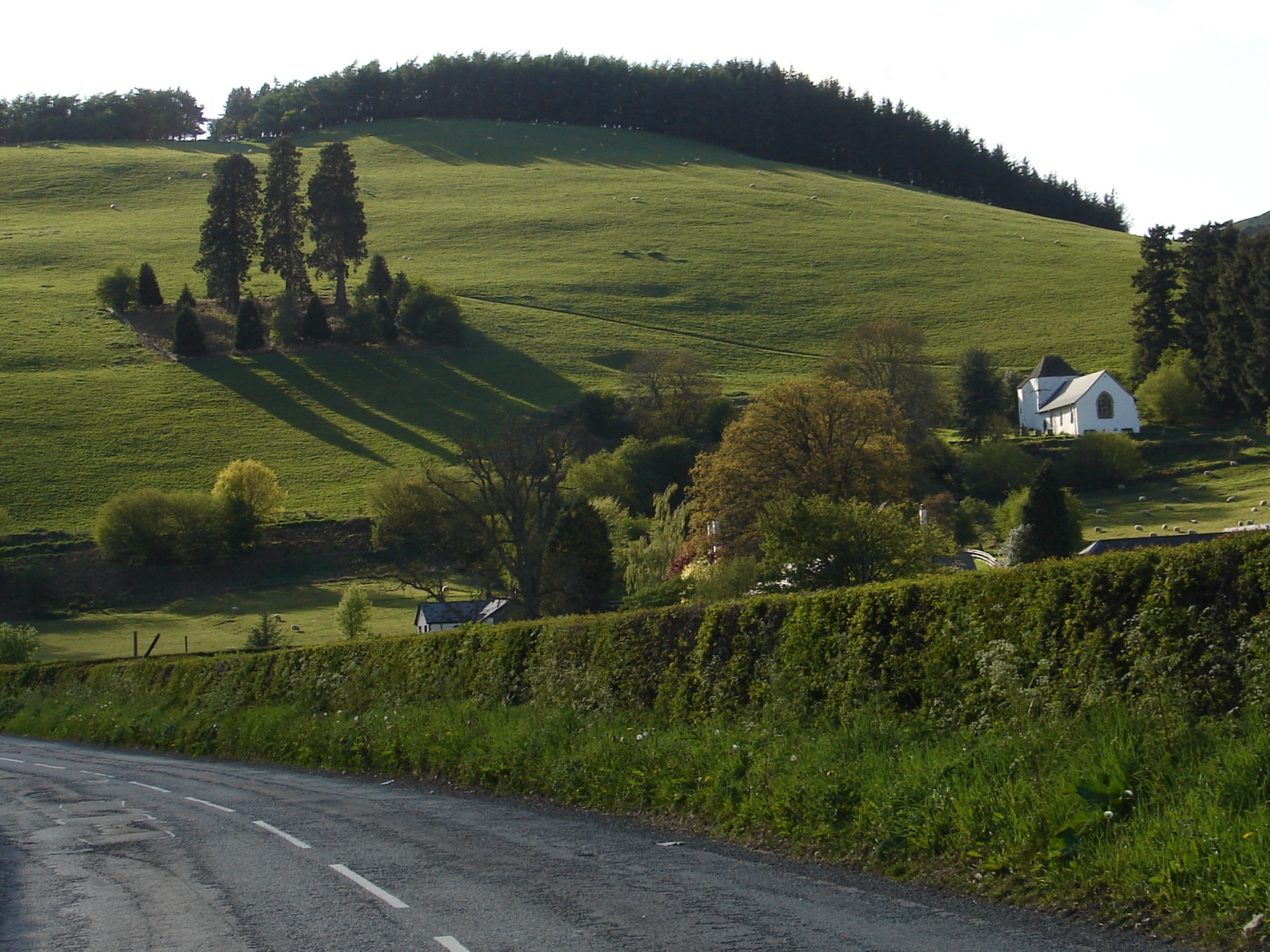
- Bryn Glas and Pilleth Church - geograph.org.uk
Date	22 June 1402 (St Alban's Day)
Location	Pilleth, Powys (2 miles south of Knighton) at grid reference SO253682
Result	Welsh victory

Belligerents
Principality of Wales	Kingdom of England

Commanders and leaders
Owain Glyndŵr	Edmund Mortimer (POW)

Strength
1,500	2,000

Casualties and losses
200 killed	600–1,100 killed

The Battle of Bryn Glas (also known as the Battle of Pilleth) was a battle between the Welsh and English on 22 June 1402, near the towns of Knighton and Presteigne in Powys, Wales. It was part of the Glyndŵr rebellion of 1400-1415. It was an important victory for the Welsh under Owain Glyndŵr, as it resulted in the prolongation of the Welsh war of independence and the destabilisation of English politics for several years afterward.

== Background ==
Owain Glyndŵr's war of independence occurred against a background of instability in the English monarchy. King Richard II of England had become alienated from many of the nobles, and had been overthrown by Henry Bolingbroke, the Duke of Lancaster, who became Henry IV of England. In Wales and the Welsh Marches, there were still many supporters of the deposed Richard, who died in captivity in 1400. In that year, Reginald Grey, 3rd Baron Grey de Ruthyn, a supporter of the new King Henry, had unlawfully seized some of Glyndŵr's lands and falsely caused charges of treason to be brought against him. In response, Glyndŵr declared himself the true Prince of Wales, and began a rebellion.

After Glyndŵr gained early successes in 1400, King Henry led a punitive expedition into north Wales and appeared to have suppressed the revolt. However, Glyndŵr remained at large, and anti-Welsh legislation by Parliament ensured that few Welshmen had reason to support continued English rule. On 1 April 1401 (which was Good Friday), two brothers from Anglesey, Rhys ap Tudur and Gwilym ap Tudur, seized Conwy Castle by trickery. Glyndŵr himself won a victory over an army of English and Flemish settlers in Pembrokeshire at Mynydd Hyddgen in mid-Wales. These two events reinvigorated the rebellion. Henry led another punitive expedition into mid-Wales, but achieved nothing and his army suffered severely from bad weather.

Early in 1402, Glyndŵr's men ambushed and captured Grey of Ruthyn, who had indirectly caused the rebellion, and held him for ransom. In June, Glyndŵr himself was near Knighton, and only 12 miles (19 km) from Leominster, then an important English garrison and market town in the Welsh Marches. King Henry had appointed Henry Percy, widely known as "Hotspur", as his principal lieutenant and justiciar in North Wales and the adjacent Marches. Hotspur's uncle, the Earl of Worcester, held a similar appointment in the south. However, the force which confronted Glyndŵr near Knighton was a county levy of Herefordshire under Sir Edmund Mortimer.

Mortimer was uncle of the young Edmund de Mortimer, 5th Earl of March, and either of them had a better hereditary claim to be King of England than Henry. (The childless Richard II had declared Sir Edmund's brother and the young Edmund's father, Roger Mortimer, 4th Earl of March, to be heir apparent to the crown, but Roger had died the year before Richard was overthrown and none of the nobles supported his son's claim.) However, Sir Edmund Mortimer had so far loyally supported the new king. In any case, as a substantial holder of lands in Wales and on the borders, Mortimer had already suffered from the depredations of Glyndŵr's rebels and appeared to have much to lose should the revolt continue.

== Battle ==
There were few contemporary sources for details of the battle, and some, such as that of Adam of Usk, contained inaccuracies. Most details must, therefore, be assumptions, although the ground remains largely unchanged and provides a reasonable basis for them.

The Wigmore Chronicle says the battle site was 'upon the hill called Bryn Glas in Maelienydd near Knighton'. Nicholas Bysshop wrote in about c.1432, that it was 'on a hill with a spring and on the right side of an adjacent hill' (Graig Hill) and the Prose Brut locates it 'on the Blacke Hyll' (Black Hill).

Mortimer's army was seeking to bring Glyndŵr's smaller army to battle. Although the location was only just inside Wales, Glyndŵr undoubtedly had many local informants and sympathisers and could plan a decisive battle. Probably, he had also been able to summon reinforcements from other parts of Wales, which moved rapidly over hill tracks, and was therefore far stronger than Mortimer realised.

Though always a risky tactic, Glyndŵr divided his army. Part of the army, including many archers armed with the powerful longbow, was placed on the slopes of the hill. The remainder were concealed in a valley to the left of the hill, camouflaged by thick foliage.

Mortimer's army formed up and advanced up the slope, against the Welsh archers clearly in view. With the advantage of height, Glyndŵr's archers outranged Mortimer's (themselves armed with longbows). As Mortimer's men-at-arms tried to close with Glyndwr's archers, the Welsh troops who had been concealed in the valley emerged to attack Mortimer's right flank and rear.

At some stage, contingents of Welsh archers in Mortimer's army defected, and loosed arrows against their former comrades. It is not known whether their defection was planned in advance, or whether they chose to back Glyndŵr in the middle of the battle as the likely winner. Their action contributed to the confusion of Mortimer's army which, attacked from the steep slopes above, and from their flank and rear, was destroyed.

Among those killed were Sir Walter Devereaux of Weobley; Kinard de la Bere, three-time Sheriff of Herefordshire; and Sir Robert Whitney, who was Henry IV's Knight-Marshal.

== Aftermath ==
It was claimed by contemporary accounts that immediately after the battle, many English corpses were mutilated by Welsh women camp followers, in revenge for the punitive expeditions by Henry IV in the previous years, which had been marked by many acts of brutality and rape. Whether these mutilations took place remains open to debate, as some historians, including Philip Warner, suggest it was a story perpetrated by the English parliament to portray the Welsh as savages. The English dead lay unburied, and the stench caused the area to be avoided for months.

The battle was one of the greatest Welsh victories against an English army in the open field. News of it brought many Welshmen who had hitherto been undecided to openly support Glyndŵr. On the English side, it resulted in some panicked appointments of officers and hasty reinforcements of garrisons all over Wales.

Mortimer was captured in the battle. Henry (who was in financial difficulties) made no effort to ransom him. Mortimer subsequently renounced his allegiance to King Henry IV, put forward his nephew's claim to the throne of England, and married Glyndŵr's daughter Catrin.

The battle is mentioned by William Shakespeare in Henry IV, Part 1:

the noble Mortimer,

Leading the men of Herefordshire to fight,
Against the wild and irregular Glendower,
Was by the rude hand of that Welshman taken,

A thousand of his people butchered

== Archaeological survey ==
The Welsh Battlefields Survey carried out by the Royal Commission on the Ancient and Historical Monuments of Wales (RCAHMW) said that it is not possible to identify the exact location of the battle from the available documentary and archaeological evidence. Archaeological work carried out in 2012 found no evidence of the battle on Bryn Glas. RCAHMW says that the battle site is likely to be near Bryn Glas and the two neighbouring hills.

== Contemporary site ==
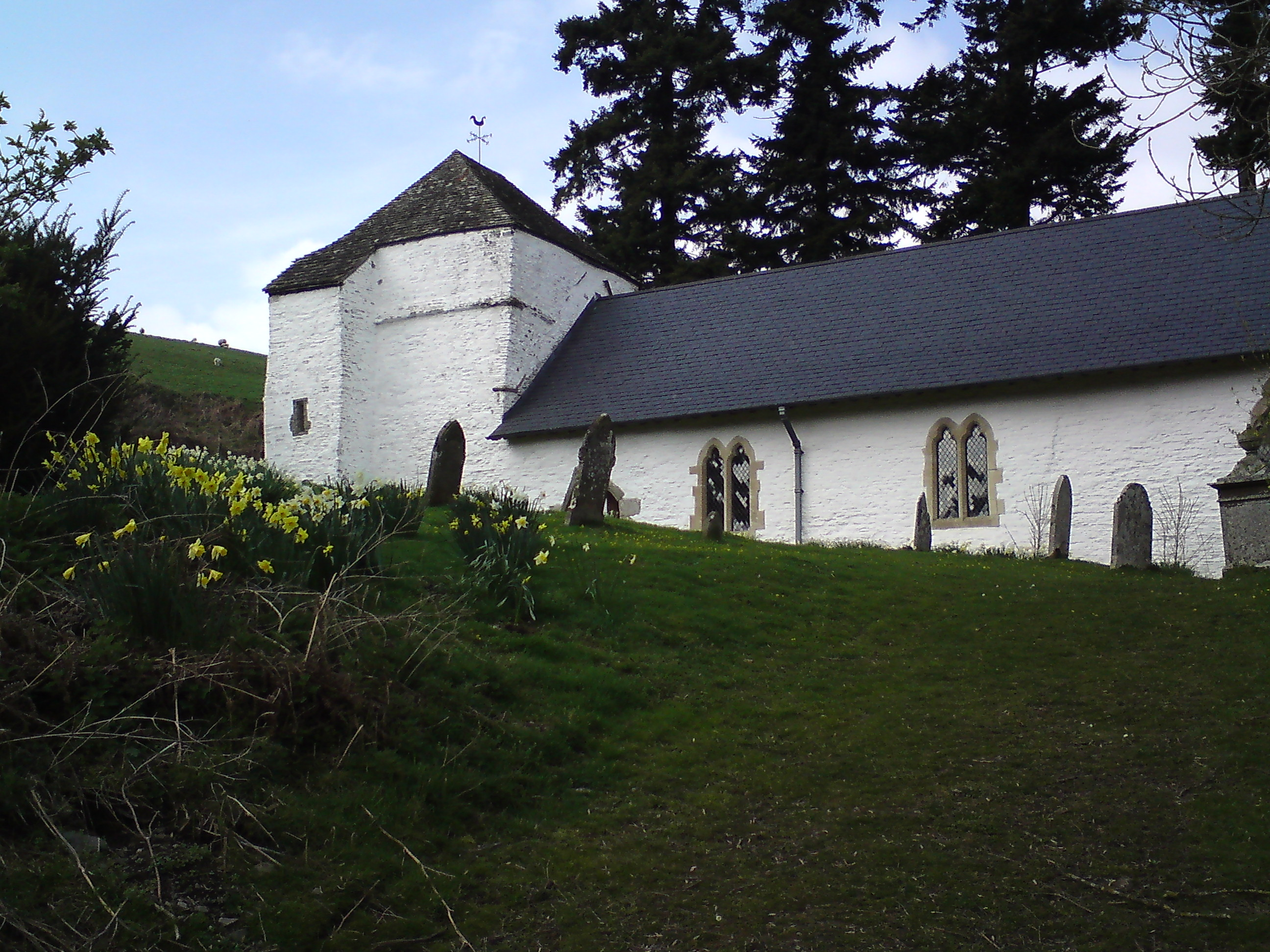
St Mary's Church, Pilleth

St Mary's church at Pilleth stands on Bryn Glas and predates the battle. In the grounds of the church is a spring-fed well. There is limited parking available at the church.

A stand of Wellingtonia was planted to mark the site where the remains of those killed in the battle are said to have been buried.

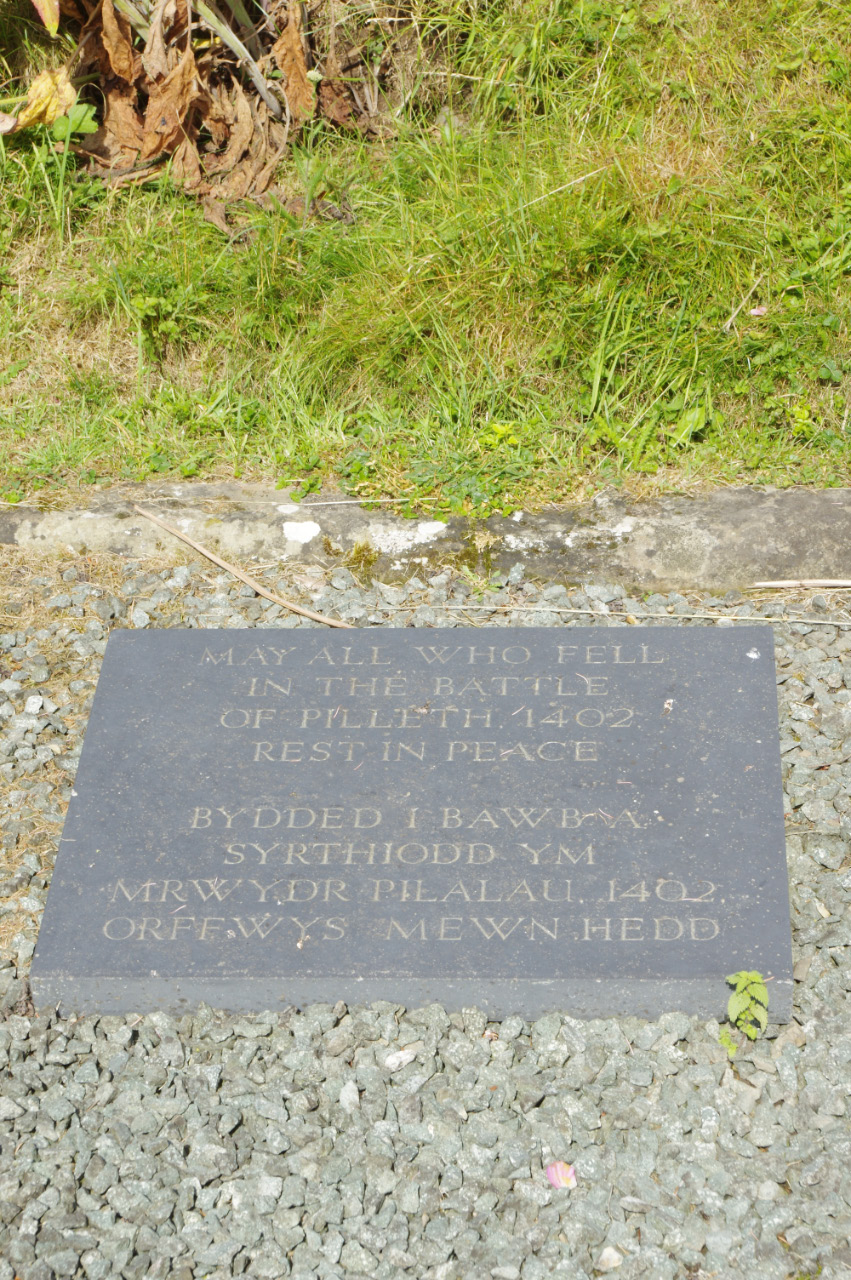
Battle of Bryn Glas commemoration plaque, Pilleth churchyard

== Reconstructions ==
A computer-animated reconstruction of the battle was featured in the BBC series, Battlefield Britain, narrated by Peter Snow.

== In fiction ==
The battle is described in Chapter XV, entitled 'Bryn Glas', of John Cowper Powys's historical novel Owen Glendower (1941).

The battle is also described in Chapter 4 (Section - April 1402 to July 1403) of Edith Pargeter’s historical novel A Bloody Field by Shrewsbury (1972)

== Sources ==
- Famous Welsh Battles, Philip Warner, Fontana, 1977, ISBN 0-00-634151-9
- The Revolt of Owain Glyn Dwr, R. R. Davies, Oxford Paperbacks, 1995, ISBN 0-19-285336-8
