= Llanbedr Painscastle =

Settlement in Powys, Wales

Coordinates: 52.1096°N 3.2541°W

Llanbedr
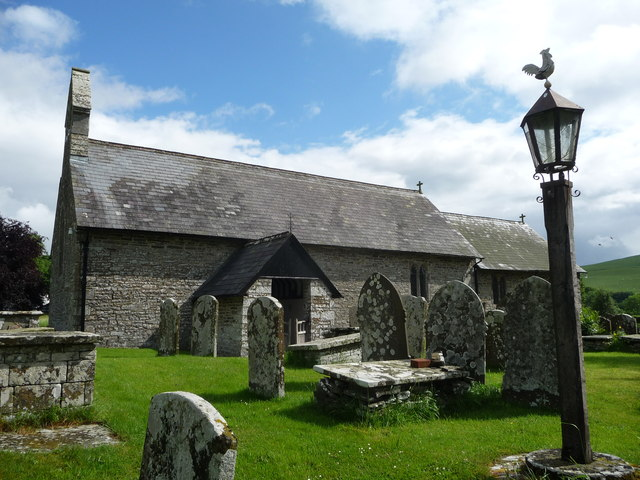
- St Peter's Church

- Location within Powys
- Community: Painscastle
- Principal area: Powys
- Preserved county: Powys
- Country: Wales
- Sovereign state: United Kingdom
- Post town: BUILTH WELLS
- Postcode district: LD2
- Police: Dyfed-Powys
- Fire: Mid and West Wales
- Ambulance: Welsh
- UK Parliament: Brecon, Radnor and Cwm Tawe
- Senedd Cymru – Welsh Parliament: Brecon and Radnorshire

Llanbedr or Llanbedr Painscastle (Welsh: Llanbedr Castell-Paen) is a small settlement and former parish in the community of Painscastle, in Powys, Wales. It was a community itself until 1983. Initially the parish had also included Painscastle and Rhosgoch.

St Peter's Church in Llanbedr Painscastle was largely a ruin by 1872. Llanbedr Hall was thought to have been built during the 18th century, however this was demolished during the 20th century.
