= Pilleth =

Hamlet in Powys, Wales

Coordinates: 52.3063°N 3.0905°W

Pilleth (Welsh: Pilalau) is a small village south of Knighton in Powys, Wales in the traditional county of Radnorshire. It is the site of the ancient church and holy well of St. Mary’s which stands on Bryn Glas Hill overlooking the River Lugg, as it makes its way to Presteigne.

Until 1983 Pilleth was a community.

== Name ==
The earliest reference to Pilleth is in the Domesday Book of 1086, where it is noted as Pilelei. In the Domesday Book, the settlement is listed within the hundred of Hezetre and the county of Herefordshire. There are various explanations as to the origins of the name:

- Pwll-y-Llethr – translated from Welsh to The Pit on the Slope, which could refer to the healing well of the church of St. Mary
- Pill Lledd – translated to The Wide Refuge which could refer to a tunnel from the monastery at Monaughty to the well

== Well and the church ==
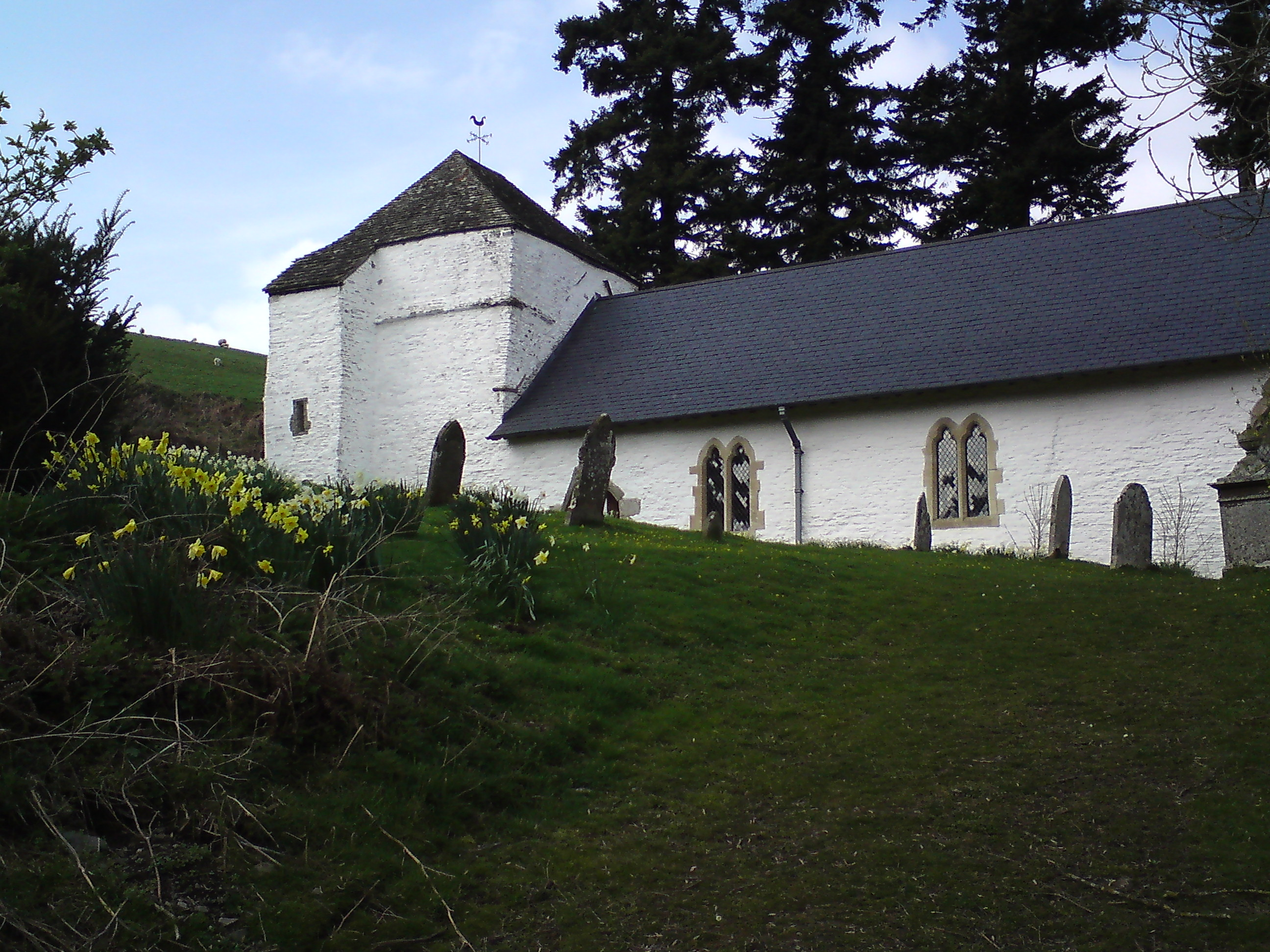
St Mary's Church, Pilleth

It is thought by historians that Pilleth has been a place of worship since the foundations of the early Celtic Christian church. People would make pilgrimages to the holy well, reputed to have healing properties for the eyes in particular. The church was much frequented in the Middle Ages, with the current structure dating mainly from the 13th century, the tower from the 14th century, and its single bell from circa 1450.

The church was greatly damaged during the 1402 battle, and a fire in 1894 destroyed much of the ancient woodwork, with surviving items transferred to other local churches. As a result of new cottages being built, the village began to grow again in late Victorian times to a population of over 100. In 1909 Edward Whitehead, a London lawyer resident in Nant-y-Groes, engaged Sir Walter Tapper who installed a temporary roof and the stone steps on the southern side.

After the sword, breastplate and set of spurs reportedly belonging to Sir John Price were stolen in the 1990s, The Friends of Pilleth was formed to help raise funds for the restoration and ongoing maintenance of St Mary's. A major programme of restoration was undertaken in 2002–2004, partly funded by a grant from the Heritage Lottery Fund and with support from the European Regional Development Fund. The church is open for worship, with services usually at 3.00p.m. on the 4th Sunday in summer months.

== Battle of Bryn Glas ==
Pilleth was also the location of one of the most important battles in Welsh history. On 22 June 1402 during the Battle of Bryn Glas, the Welsh forces of Owain Glyndŵr defeated the English forces of Sir Edmund Mortimer, Lord of the March. the Welsh force went on to sack and burn Leominster. The Battle of Pilleth was subsequently mentioned by Shakespeare in Henry IV, Part 1. In the 19th century four redwood Wellingtonia trees were planted after the discovery of a large burial ground.
