= Erwood railway station =

Former railway station in Wales

Erwood
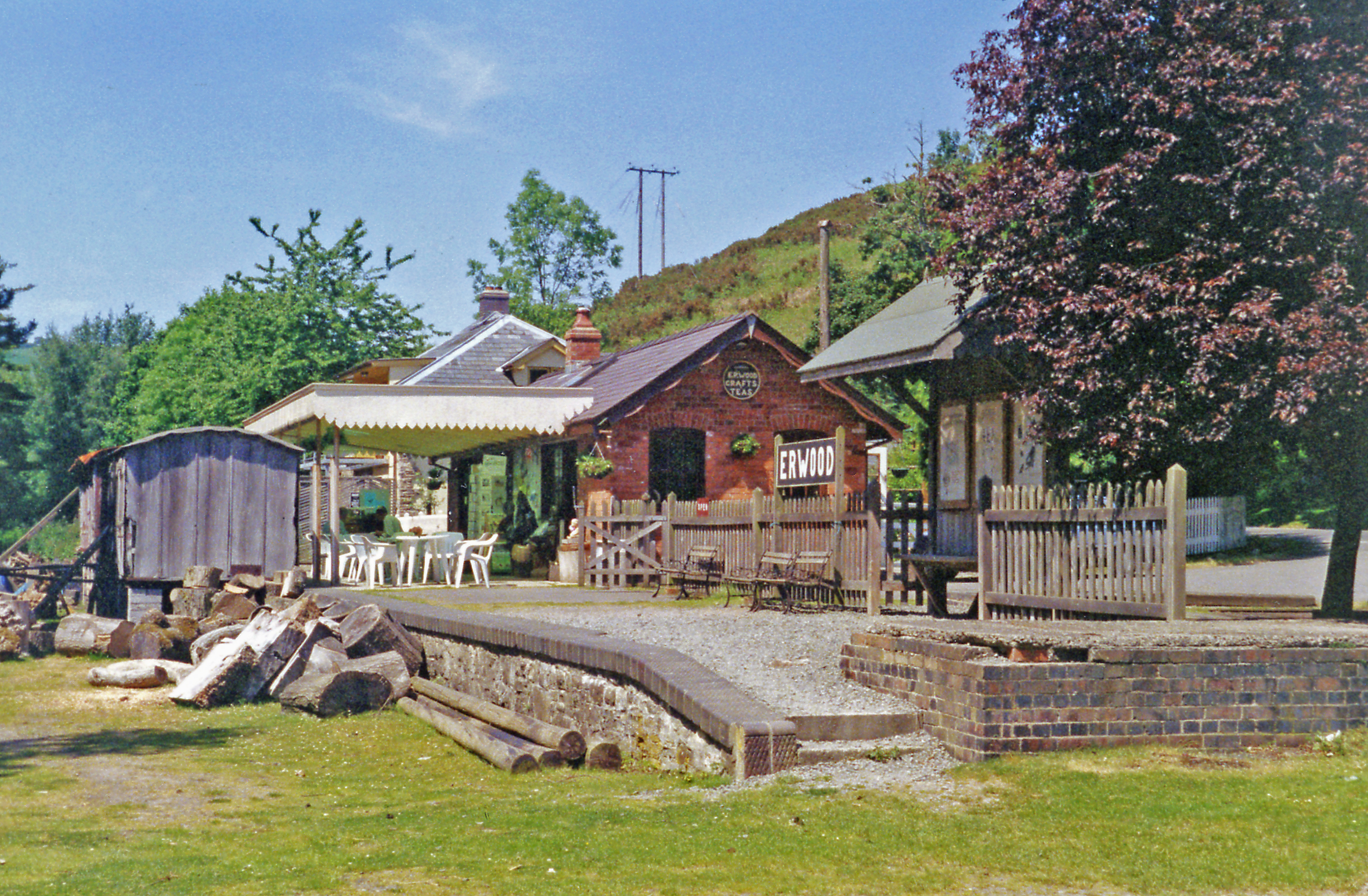
- The former station at Erwood

General information
- Location: Erwood, Powys; Wales
- Coordinates: 52.0861°N 3.3315°W
- Grid reference: SO087439
- Platforms: 2

Other information
- Status: Disused

History
- Original company: Mid-Wales Railway
- Pre-grouping: Cambrian Railways
- Post-grouping: Great Western Railway

Key dates
- 1864: Opened
- 1962: Closed
Location

Erwood railway station is a former station on the Mid Wales Railway in Erwood, between Brecon and Llanidloes, Powys, Wales.

The station building has been reconstructed but the platforms remain in situ. The station house is intact with extensions.

There are three old railway carriages at Erwood on the platform edge. Two house craft exhibits and another awaits restoration. There is also a 1939 Fowler 0-4-0 industrial diesel locomotive, maker's number 22878, fleet number 'AMW No. 169', and named "Alan", which has been cosmetically restored. It is named after Alan Cunningham, the founder of Erwood Craft Centre.

The three carriages are:

- Great Western Railway six-compartment luggage composite, (body only)
- Midland Railway six-wheel five-compartment Third (body only), built 1886
- GWR 587 Four-wheel Third (body only), built 1873

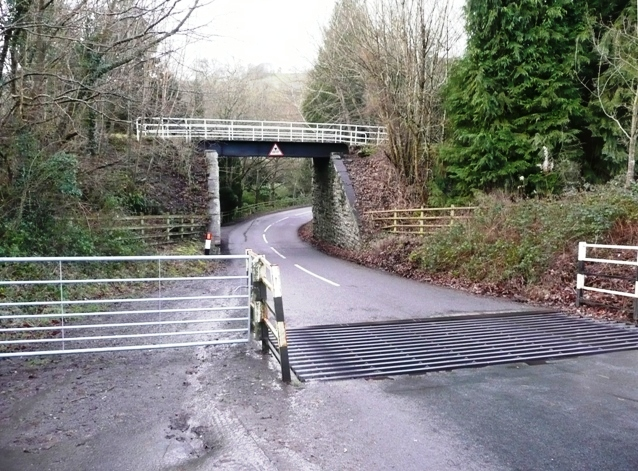
Railway trackbed now a road in Erwood.

| Preceding station | Disused railways | Following station |
|---|---|---|
| Aberedw; Line and station closed | Cambrian Railways; Mid-Wales Railway | Llanstephan Halt; Line and station closed |
