= Erwood =

Erwood: Welsh: Erwyd
- Community
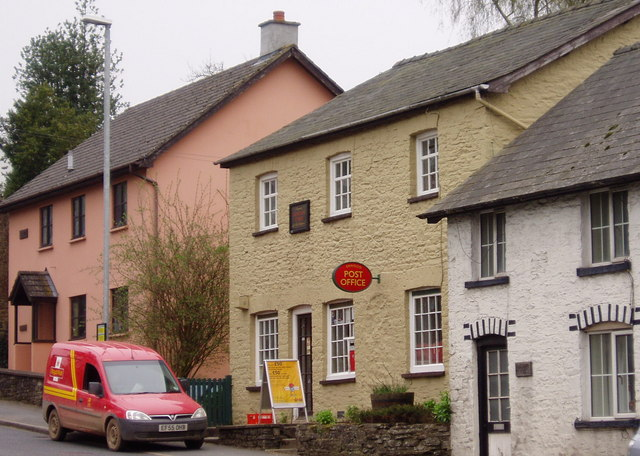
- Erwood post office

- Location within Powys
- Principal area: Powys
- Country: Wales
- Sovereign state: United Kingdom
- Police: Dyfed-Powys
- Fire: Mid and West Wales
- Ambulance: Welsh
- List of places UK Wales Powys 52.0784°N 3.3195°W Community map: Map of the community

Erwood (Welsh: Erwyd) is a village and community lying beside the River Wye, on the A470 road some 6 miles south-east of Builth Wells in Powys, Wales. The population of the community taken at the 2011 census was 429. It is in the historic county of Brecknockshire (Breconshire) and the older cantref of Cantref Selyf. The community includes the settlements of Crickadarn, Gwenddwr and Llaneglwys.

Nant Clettwr, flowing from west to east before turning north through the village to join the River Wye, divides Erwood between the two parishes of Gwenddwr, to the northwest, and Crickadarn, to the southeast. The church of Saint Dubricius in Gwenddwr was extensively rebuilt in the Victorian period after a fire. In former times drovers would ford the Wye at Erwood on their journey towards the English Midlands and eventually London, where they would sell their livestock.

Erwood is overlooked from across the Wye by the ancient hill-fort of Twyn y Garth. On its 325-metre-high summit is a German field howitzer, a trophy from World War I. The fact that it is pointing towards Erwood from the neighbouring county of Radnorshire is part of a local running joke.

At the southern end of the community, on the Nant Scithwen, is Trericket Mill where Roderick Murchison recorded in the 1830s that he had identified "the first true Silurian" crossing the river at nearby Cavansham Ferry, now recognised as an internationally important IUGS geological heritage site.

== Village name ==
The name Erwood is of uncertain origin and is recorded in numerous forms over the centuries. It may derive from the rare cerwyd meaning 'stag' with subsequent anglicization to '-wood'. It is known in Welsh as Erwyd which may be a cymricization of Erwood.

== Village life ==
The Erwood Community consists of the village, the two ancient parishes of Gwenddwr and Crickadarn, and the former Forestry Commission hamlet of Llaneglwys. The village is the centre of a flourishing branch of the Young Farmers' Club. The village shop and post office no longer exists, and of the two pubs one, The Erwood Inn, is now a family home.

Until 1962 Erwood railway station, about 1 kilometre (0.6 miles) away, served the village. Now a renowned Centre for the Arts Erwood Station Gallery & Tea Rooms

The nearby Crickadarn was used as a location in the film An American Werewolf in London, for the portrayal of the fictional village of "East Proctor".
