= Aberedw =

- Village and community
- Location within Powys
- Population: 229 (2011)
- OS grid reference: SO080476
- Community: Aberedw
- Principal area: Powys
- Preserved county: Powys
- Country: Wales
- Sovereign state: United Kingdom
- Post town: Builth Wells
- Postcode district: LD2
- Police: Dyfed-Powys
- Fire: Mid and West Wales
- Ambulance: Welsh
- UK Parliament: Brecon, Radnor and Cwm Tawe
- Senedd Cymru – Welsh Parliament: Brycheiniog Tawe Nedd
- List of places UK Wales Powys 52°07′N 3°21′W Community map: Map of the community

Aberedw is a village and community in Powys, Wales. Historically in Radnorshire, the community covers an area of 3,055 hectares (11.80 mi^{2}). Its population was 229, according to the 2011 census; a 4.57% increase since the 219 people noted in 2001. The 2011 census showed 4.8% of the population could speak Welsh, a fall from 11.2% in 2001.

The ruins of the medieval Aberedw Castle are nearby. The villages of Llanbadarn y Garreg and Rhulen are in the community.

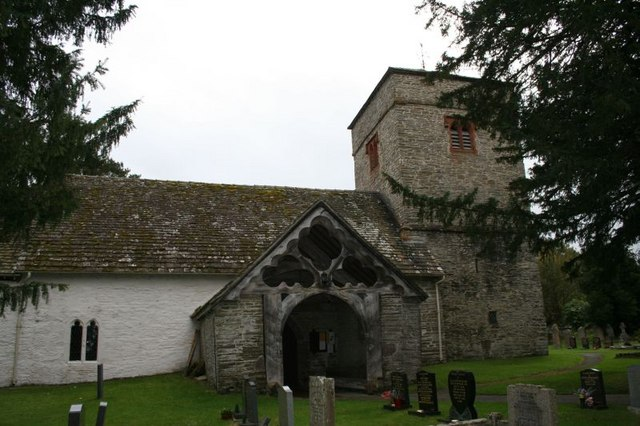
Church of St Cewydd

The church of St Cewydd is a grade II* listed building.

== History ==
According to tradition, Llywelyn ap Gruffudd, the last native Prince of Wales, spent his final night at Aberedw in December 1282, sheltering in a cave beside the River Edw, since known as Llywelyn's Cave (Ogof Llywelyn), before he was killed the following day at nearby Cilmeri.
