= Radnorshire Wildlife Trust =

Wildlife trust in mid Wales

Radnorshire Wildlife Trust (Welsh: Ymddiriedolaeth Natur Maesyfed) is one of six wildlife trusts in Wales. Based in Llandrindod Wells, Powys, it covers the vice-county of Radnorshire.

It has 18 reserves.
