= Rhulen =

Village in Powys, Wales

Coordinates: 52.1403°N 3.2621°W

Rhulen: Welsh: Rhiwlen
- Location within Powys
- Community: Aberedw
- Principal area: Powys
- Preserved county: Powys
- Country: Wales
- Sovereign state: United Kingdom
- Police: Dyfed-Powys
- Fire: Mid and West Wales
- Ambulance: Welsh
- UK Parliament: Brecon, Radnor and Cwm Tawe
- Senedd Cymru – Welsh Parliament: Brecon and Radnorshire

Rhulen (Welsh: Rhiwlen, standardised as Rhiwlen bilingually) is a hamlet and former parish in Powys, Wales. It was a civil parish, and after 1974 a community, until it was abolished on 1 April 1983. At the 1971 census, the last before the parish was abolished, it had a population of 28.

The parish was in the historic county of Radnorshire. Its name is attested as Ruylnynnan in 1232 and as Ryulan around 1291. In the mid-16th century it was spelt Rulen or Riwlen, closer to the current spelling. The name likely comes from rhiw ("hill") and glan ("slope").

The church in Rhulen is dedicated to St David.
