= Painscastle =

Village and community in Powys, Wales

- Village and community
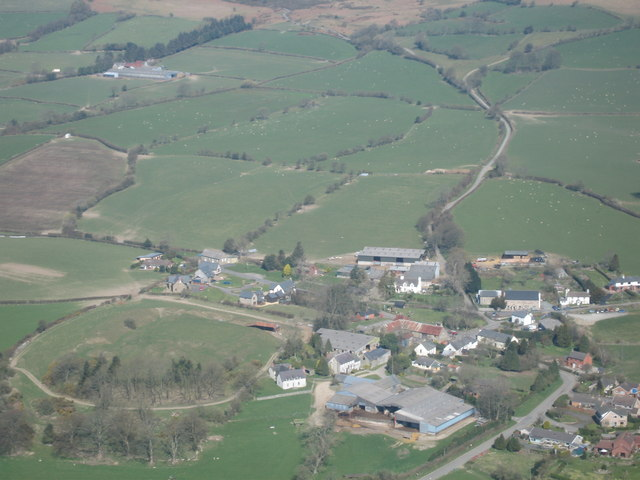
- Painscastle, aerial view

- Location within Powys
- Principal area: Powys
- Country: Wales
- Sovereign state: United Kingdom
- Police: Dyfed-Powys
- Fire: Mid and West Wales
- Ambulance: Welsh
- List of places UK Wales Powys 52°06′N 3°13′W Community map: Map of the community

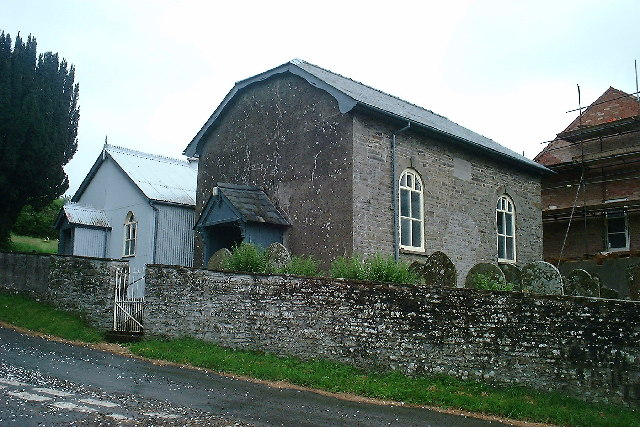
Adullam Baptist Chapel, Painscastle

Painscastle (Welsh: Castell-paen) is a village and community in Powys (formerly Radnorshire), Wales which takes its name from the castle at its heart. It lies between Builth and Hay-on-Wye, approximately 3 miles from the Wales-England border today. The community also includes the villages and settlements of Rhosgoch, Bryngwyn, Llandeilo Graban and Llanbedr. The population as of the 2011 UK Census was 524. It is represented by the Painscastle and Rhosgoch Community Council, which comprises eight community councillors. It is included in the Glasbury electoral ward for Powys County Council elections.

The southern boundary of the community runs through the Begwns, the larger part of which range of hills are within the community. The village itself sits in the broad valley of the Bachawy a small left-bank tributary of the River Wye which runs westwards to the south of it. To the north the community extends to include Red Hill, Llanbedr Hill and Bryngwyn Hill.

== Castle ==
Little now remains of the castle that gives the village its name, other than the massive earthworks. The first castle would appear to have been built by Pain fitzJohn and probably destroyed after his death in 1137. The castle was rebuilt and in the hands of William de Braose, 4th Lord of Bramber by 1195, subsequently attacked by Rhys ap Gruffudd of Deheubarth and Gwenwynwyn ab Owain of Powys during the late 1190s. After being briefly in the hands of King John of England it was captured by Gwalter ab Einion Clud in 1215. He was granted the Lordship of Elfael until his death in 1222 and after this date the castle was destroyed by the Welsh. In 1231 the castle was rebuilt in stone by King Henry III of England. It was again destroyed by the Welsh in 1265 and rebuilt by Ralph Tosny 1277. It was refortified yet again at the time of the Welsh rebellion led by Owain Glyndŵr in 1401.
