= Llanbadarn y Garreg =

Village in Powys, Wales

Coordinates: 52.129°N 3.300°W

- Village
- St Padarn's Church, 2023

- Location within Powys
- OS grid reference: SO111486
- Community: Aberedw
- Principal area: Powys
- Preserved county: Powys
- Country: Wales
- Sovereign state: United Kingdom
- Police: Dyfed-Powys
- Fire: Mid and West Wales
- Ambulance: Welsh
- UK Parliament: Brecon, Radnor and Cwm Tawe
- Senedd Cymru – Welsh Parliament: Brecon and Radnorshire

Llanbadarn y Garreg (also spelt Llanbadarn-y-Garreg and Llanbadarn Garreg) is a village in the community of Aberedw, Powys, Wales. It is 45.1 miles (72.6 km) from Cardiff and 141.9 miles (228.4 km) from London. Until 1983, it was a community.

== Governance ==
Llanbadarn y Garreg is represented in the Senedd by Kirsty Williams and in the UK parliament by David Chadwick, MP for Brecon, Radnor and Cwm Tawe. They are both Liberal Democrats.

== St Padarn's Church ==
Interior of the church

St Padarn's Church is a small medieval parish church located on the east side of the village, adjacent to the west of the River Edw. It is dedicated to Padarn. It is administered by the Church in Wales.

The building features a pulpit on a stone base, unicellular room, wooden-framed windows, and belfry. The oldest surviving element is the south doorway and medieval font, dating back to at least the 13th century.

== See also ==
- List of towns in Wales
