= Llandeilo Graban =

Settlement in Powys, Wales

Coordinates: 52.0937°N 3.3246°W

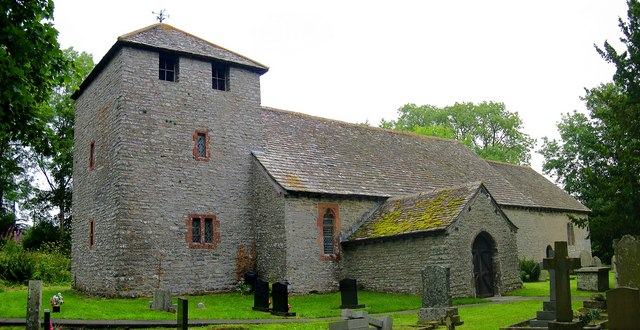
- St Teilo's Church

- Location within Powys
- Community: Painscastle
- Principal area: Powys
- Preserved county: Powys
- Country: Wales
- Sovereign state: United Kingdom
- Post town: Builth Wells
- Postcode district: LD2
- Police: Dyfed-Powys
- Fire: Mid and West Wales
- Ambulance: Welsh
- UK Parliament: Brecon, Radnor and Cwm Tawe
- Senedd Cymru – Welsh Parliament: Brecon and Radnorshire

Llandeilo Graban is a village and former parish in the community of Painscastle, in Powys, Wales, about 6 miles from Builth Wells.

The church in Llandeilo Graban is dedicated to St Teilo, and the village is also the location of the Moriah Baptist Chapel. St Teilo's Church dates back to the 14th century. The name Llandeilo Graban refers to this church; the second element "graban" means "corn marigold" in Welsh.

Llandeilo Graban was a civil parish, at the 1971 census (the last before the abolition of the parish), Llandeilo Graban had a population of 93. In 1974 Llandeilo Graban became a community, on 1 April 1983 the community was abolished.
