= Grendon Bishop =

Civil parish in Herefordshire, England

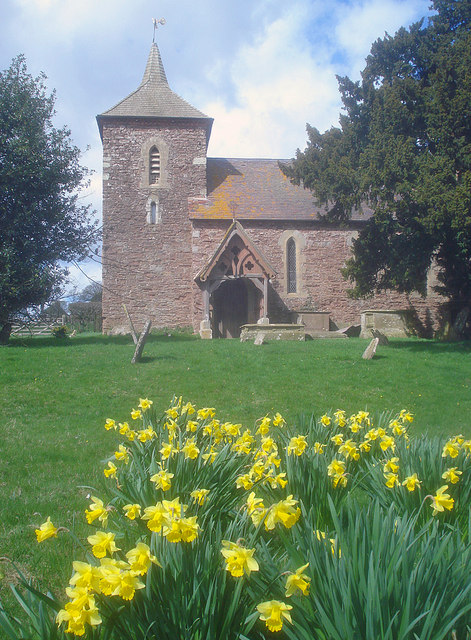
- Church of St John the Baptist

- Location within Herefordshire
- Population: 101 (2011 Census)
- OS grid reference: SO5955
  - London: 115 mi (185 km) ESE
- Unitary authority: Herefordshire
- Ceremonial county: Herefordshire
- Region: West Midlands
- Country: England
- Sovereign state: United Kingdom
- Post town: BROMYARD
- Postcode district: HR7
- Dialling code: 01885
- Police: West Mercia
- Fire: Hereford and Worcester
- Ambulance: West Midlands
- UK Parliament: North Herefordshire

Grendon Bishop is a civil parish in the county of Herefordshire, England.

== History ==
According to A Dictionary of British Place Names Grendon derives from the Old English 'grēne' with 'denu' meaning "green valley". The Concise Oxfordshire Dictionary of English Place-names adds that in the 1240s the manor was written as Grendene, Grenden and Grendone, and that Grendon Bishop was held by the Bishop of Hereford, John Trevenant, the manor given by king Richard II.

Grendon is listed as "Grenedene" in the Domesday Book. At the time of the Norman Conquest Grendon was in the Hundred of Plegelgete in the county of Herefordshire. The manor's entire listed assets was eight ploughlands. The lords in 1066 were Edwy the noble and Ordric, with a manor each. In 1086 lordship was passed to William Devereux under Roger de Lacy who became tenant-in-chief to king William I.

In 1645, during the First English Civil War, Roundhead forces laid siege to Hereford, held by the Royalists. A Scots army of "8,000 foot soldiers and 4,000 cavalry" was co-opted by Parliamentarians to support the siege. While around Hereford the Scots subjected various parishes to loss and damage; plundering at Grendon Bishop amounted to £90. 2s. 8d.

Directories from 1856 to the First World War show Grendon Bishop as a parish in the Broxash Hundred—and as a township before 1860—in the Bromyard petty sessional division, county court district, and Union – poor relief and joint workhouse provision set up under the Poor Law Amendment Act 1834 (4 & 5 Will. 4. c. 76). It was in the Bromyard electoral division and Northern division of Herefordshire until 1899, when it became part of the Herefordshire County Council Bredenbury and Bromyard polling district and electoral division. The associated place of Grendon Warren at the south, today part of Pencombe with Grendon Warren civil parish, was an extra-parochial area until the Poor Law Amendment Act 1866 (29 & 30 Vict. c. 113) which established new civil parishes. Before the 1880s the Leominster to Bromyard road (today part of the A44 road at the north of the parish), was a turnpike toll road. Places within the parish were Newbury, Westington Court, Brocklington, Little Common and Grendon Green. Parish population in 1851 was 222; in 1871, 198; in 1881, 169; in 1891, 137; and in 1911, 135. In 1890 there were 29 families or separate occupiers in 29 houses. Crops grown on a soil of "average quality" of clay over a subsoil of clay and rock, were wheat, barley, peas, hops and fruit, in a parish area listed between 1,629 acres (659 hectares) and 1,698 acres (687 hectares).

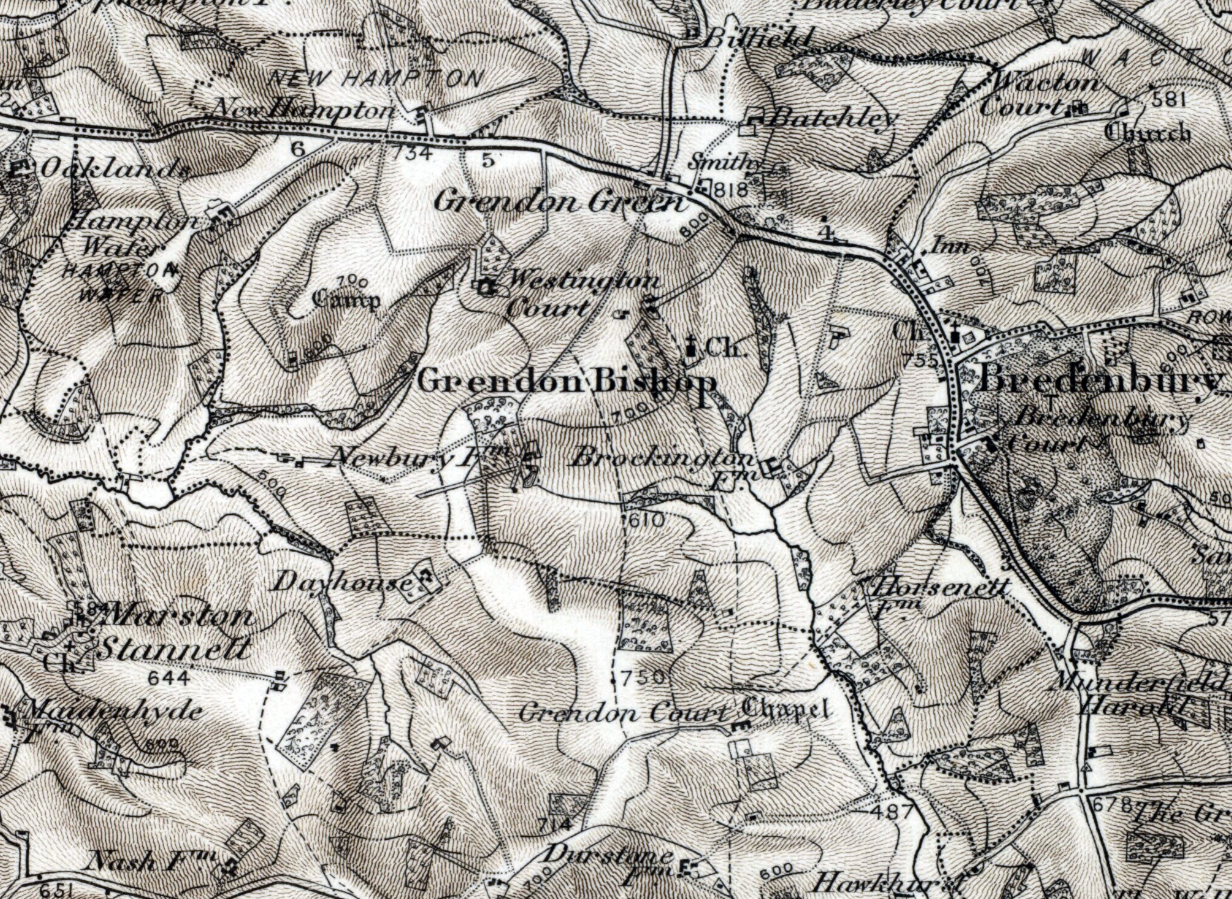
Grendon Bishop in 1897

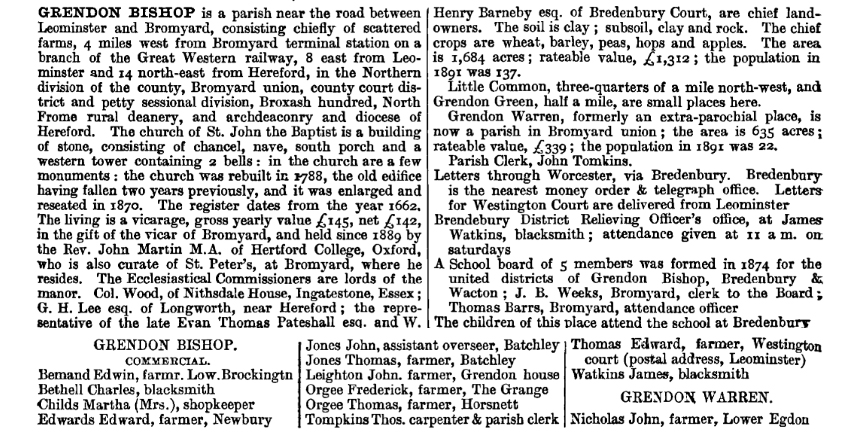
1895 Kelly's Directory entry for Grendon Bishop

The ecclesiastical parish was part of the Archdeaconry and Diocese of Hereford. The church, which was enlarged in 1870, has registers dating to 1612. In the 1850s the living was a perpetual curracy—an office supported by stipend rather than tithes or glebe—in the gift of the vicar of Bromyard. There was no designated priest residence in the parish. By 1885 the living had become a vicarage—an office supported by tithes and glebe—the vicar residing at Bromyard where, in 1890, he was also that parish's curate – assistant to the parish priest. There was no post office, police station or school at Grendon Bishop. The nearest school was at Bredenbury, where a board school for the three neighbour parishes was set up in 1874 by the five-member Grendon Bishop, Bredenbury and Wacton United School Board. By 1890 the school, with an average attendance of 49, accommodated 69 children. In the 1850s the nearest post office for collections and deliveries was at Brendenbury, which was also the closest money order office. By the 1880s, at least, the post town was Worcester, with letters also delivered "by messenger" through Bromyard, then listed as the nearest money order office and telegraph office, although letters for Grendon Green and Westington Court (at the north-west of the parish) were delivered through Leominster. In 1890 the nearest post, money order and telegraph office, and savings bank, was listed at Wacton.

Residents, trades and occupations listed at Grendon Bishop in the 1850s were four farmers, a blacksmith, a wheelwright, a carpenter, a shopkeeper, and a land agent. In the 1860s the shopkeeper is recorded at Grendon Green, and there was a butcher within the parish. By 1885 there were still four farmers, but two blacksmiths, both of whom were shopkeepers, and a farm bailiff. Five years later were listed an assistant overseer, a police constable, six farmers, three of whom also grew hops, two blacksmiths, one of whom was also a shopkeeper, a further shopkeeper, and a carpenter who was also a wheelwright. There were two carriers—transporter of trade goods, with sometimes people, between different settlements—one to Bromyard operating on Thursdays, and one to Leominster, on Fridays. Five years later still were now seven farmers, two blacksmiths, a shopkeeper, an assistant overseer, and a carpenter who was also the parish clerk. By 1913 a carpenter was still the parish clerk, and resident was the Bredenbury and District Relieving Officer, who had offices at a blacksmith's premises (possibly that at Grendon Green), and the county Deputy Lieutenant, a Justice of the Peace, who lived at Brockington Grange.

In 2018 a parish 'Characterisation Study' was undertaken which aimed to "address the historic character and local distinctiveness of the area "through volunteer fieldwork and desk-based" research. The study, which was published in January 2019, was designed to inform a future Bredenbury, Wacton and Grendon Bishop Neighbourhood Development Plan.

== Governance ==
Grendon Bishop is represented on the lowest tier of UK governance by three councillors on the Bredenbury & District Group Parish Council. As Herefordshire is a unitary authority—no district council between parish and county councils—Grendon Bishop sends one councillor, representing the Hampton Ward, to Herefordshire County Council. Grendon Bishop is represented in the UK parliament as part of the North Herefordshire constituency.

From 1974 to the 1990s Grendon Bishop was part of the Malvern Hills District of the county of Hereford and Worcester county, instituted under the Local Government Act 1972.

== Geography and community ==
Grendon Bishop, a civil parish with no village of the same name, at the north-east of Herefordshire, covers an area of 1,705 acres (7 km^{2}), and is about 3 miles (5 km) both north to south and east to west. It is approximately 12 miles (19 km) north-east from the city and county town of Hereford. The nearest towns are Leominster, approximately 6 miles (10 km) to the west and Bromyard 4 miles (6 km) to the east, joined by the A44 road which runs through the north of the parish, the only through road, the others being minor farm and residential tracks and cul-de-sacs. Adjacent civil parishes are Hatfield and Newhampton at the north, Wacton at north-east, Bredenbury at east, Pencombe with Grendon Warren at the south, Humber at south-west, and Docklow and Hampton Wafer at the west. Grendon Bishop is in the civil registration district of Bromyard, and is entirely rural, of farms, fields and streams, isolated and dispersed businesses and residential properties. There are no amenities except a church and three bed & breakfast establishments, one with camping facilities. The only mapped nucleated settlement is Grendon Green at the junction of the A44 and a minor road running north to Hatfield, Hampton Charles and Bockleton. Grendon Green comprises only an outlet for Claas agricultural vehicles, one house, and a bus stop with service connection to Ledbury, Bromyard and Leominster. To the south of Grendon Green rises the River Lodon which flows south through the parish as a tributary of the River Frome. The nearest primary schools are at Bredenbury at the east of the parish, and Pencombe 2.5 miles (4 km) to the south, the nearest secondary, Queen Elizabeth High School which is 3 miles to the south-east at Bromyard. The closest railway connection is at Leominster railway station on the Crewe to Newport Welsh Marches Line.

== Landmarks ==
Grendon Bishop contains seven Grade II listed buildings and scheduled monuments.

The parish church of St John the Baptist (52.204163°N 2.590043°W) dates to 1787 and replaced an early church which was pulled down two years earlier. It was enlarged and modified by F.R. Kempson of Hereford in 1870, and was listed in 1973. The church, of Gothic Revival style, and constructed in red sandstone with a tiled roof, comprises a nave, a chancel, a two-stage west tower with a shingle broach spire, and a south porch. The chancel and nave are part of a continuous structure separated by a chancel arch, a tower arch at the west dividing the nave from the tower. The chancel east end sanctuary is within a polygonal apse. The interior walls are plastered, the south wall of the tower having an inbuilt window from the earlier Norman church. The nave roof is of trusses and rafters. The nave floor is part plain flagstone and part wood plank, with the chancel's of decorative encaustic tiles. The pews and choir stalls are of pine, and date to the 1870 modification. At the west of the nave is a flat-painted tub font, perhaps Romanesque and possibly 18th-century. At the nave north wall against the chancel arch is a 20-century pulpit. Wall memorial tablets date from 1756 to 1816. The church lychgate, evident in 1932, was probably 17th century. The church is under the care of the Herefordshire Historic Churches Trust, and is in the Bredenbury with Grendon Bishop and Wacton parish of the Deanery of Bromyard and the Diocese of Hereford.

Grendon Manor (52.206057°N 2.592404°W), listed in 1952 and a designated scheduled monument, dates to the early 16th century. The house is of two storeys in painted brickwork, with a tiled roof and casement windows. It is significant for its interior 17th-century panelling and a decoratively carved overmantel.

Lower Brockington Farmhouse (52.199823°N 2.584368°W), listed in 1952 and a designated scheduled monument, dates to the 15th and 16th centuries. It is partly timber-framed and of two storeys with a gable-ended slate roof and casement windows. The house, originally a single floor-to-roof hall, was converted to two floors in the late 16th century, and extended in the 17th.

Newbury Farmhouse (52.200055°N 2.600601°W), a designated scheduled monument, is a probable early 17th-century "much altered" H-plan house, of two storeys plus attics and slate roof. The interior has exposed timber framing and ceiling beams.

The Old Forge (52.210969°N 2.591331°W), listed in 1973, and a designated scheduled monument, is a two-storey cottage dating to the 18th century. Constructed of rubble and red brick, it has a tiled roof and casement windows, two on each floor either side a central doorway. The listing includes a red brick blacksmith's workshop.

Westington Court (52.206854°N 2.602682°W), listed in 1952 and a designated scheduled monument, is a timber-framed T-plan house dating to the 15th, 16th and 17th centuries. The timber framing is in parts plastered over, with the south aspect faced in red brick with added and sash windows in the 18th century. Other windows are casement. It is of two storeys plus an attic and a tiled roof. The interior is significant for its mid-17th-century staircase, panelling, and decoratively carved overmantel.

Westington Camp (52.20651°N 2.615814°W), possibly the earthworks remains of an Iron Age hillfort or camp, is a scheduled monument. The raised remains are of only the south-west part, which rises to 40 feet (12 m) and of 150 yards (137 m) in length, the other parts either destroyed by subsequent farming or not finished. Other edges of the enclosure have indications of ditches and berms.
