= Leysters =

Civil parish in Herefordshire, England

Coordinates: 52.2668°N 2.63370°W

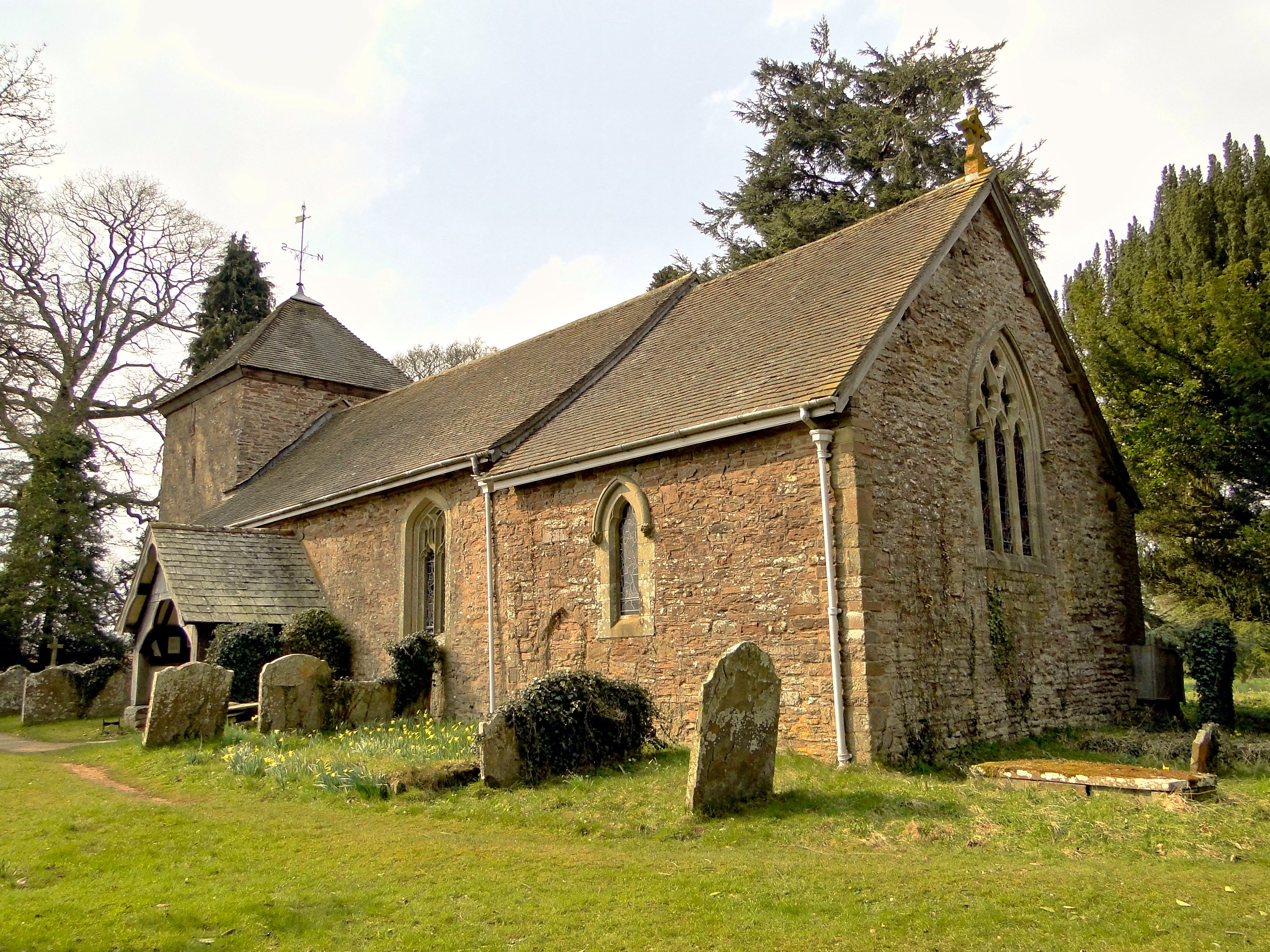
- St Andrew's church

- Location within Herefordshire
- OS grid reference: SO568633
  - London: 120 mi (190 km) SE
- Civil parish: Leysters
- Unitary authority: Herefordshire
- Ceremonial county: Herefordshire
- Region: West Midlands
- Country: England
- Sovereign state: United Kingdom
- Post town: Tenbury Wells
- Postcode district: WR15
- Dialling code: 01568
- Police: West Mercia
- Fire: Hereford and Worcester
- Ambulance: West Midlands
- UK Parliament: North Herefordshire

Leysters or Laysters is a civil parish in north-east Herefordshire, England, and approximately 15 miles (20 km) north-northeast from the city and county town of Hereford. The nearest towns are the market towns of Leominster 4.5 miles (7 km) to the south-west, and Tenbury Wells in Worcestershire, 3.5 miles (6 km) miles to the north-east. Within Letton is the Grade I listed Church of St Andrew.

== History ==
Laysters in the Domesday Book is written as "Last", in 1228 as "Lastes", and in 1242 and 1257 as "Lastres". The parish hamlet of Woonton, in Domesday is written as "Wenetone". Domesday shows that Laysters was in the Hundred of Wolfhay, under three owners, and described as 'waste'. The first manor had in 1066 belonged to Arngrim of Womerton and Arnketil, lordship transferred in 1086 to Roger of Mussegros, who was also tenant-in-chief to king William I. The second, in 1066, belonged to Godric, transferred to Bernard in 1086 under the tenants-in-chief Durand of Gloucester, and Walter son of Roger. The third, in 1066, belonged to Eadric the Wild under the overlordship of King Edward, in 1086 remaining with Edric who was also tenant-in-chief in chief to William I.

In the reign of king John (1199 to 1216), Laysters belonged to the lords of Kilpeck Castle. Part of the manor was passed to Ralph Botyler, through his wife, Kilpeck co-heiress Lady Maud Pantulf, during the reign of Edward IV (1442 – 1483), with a further part to the Devereux family. Then both parts of the manor came into the hands of the Delamere family, who sold it to a Thomas Whitgreave, Receiver to Richard, Duke of York. Whitgreave's daughter married Thomas Barneby of Ludlow, Shropshire, the Treasurer to Edward IV. Part of Laysters was sold in 1653 to a John Clark, who was the receiver to Charterhouse; his granddaughter in 1675 bringing it to John Powel of Whyle. The other part of the manor remained with the Barneby family until 1795.

The church at Laysters was historically a chapel to Tenbury Priory, but was appropriated by Sheen Priory under Henry V. Laysters was part of the rectory of Tenbury, but at the dissolution of monasteries the parish was leased to a Thomas Acton and his descendants.

=== 19th century ===
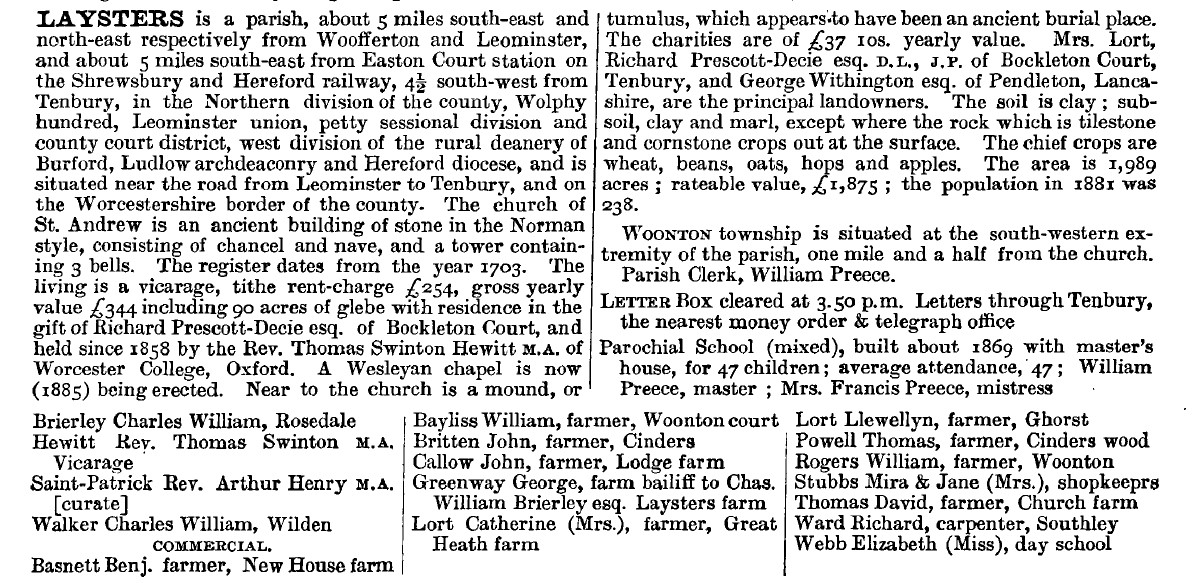
Laysters in Kelly's Directory of Herefordshire, 1885

In the 1850s and 1860s Laysters is described as a parish near the Leominster to Tenbury road and in the Wolphy hundred and the Leominster Union—poor relief and joint parish workhouse provision set up under the Poor Law Amendment Act 1834— that included the township, later in the 1890s the hamlet, of Woonton (grid reference SO5503461772), at the south-west of the parish. The ecclesiastical parish (as Leysters), was in the Shropshire archdeaconry, and Hereford bishopric. The church of St Andrew is described as an "old stone building of massive character, but not possessing sufficient architectural features to mark the style". The church, repaired in the early 1830s, comprises a tower, nave, and chancel, and contains "several" plain mural tablets. The living is a perpetual curracy—office supported by stipend rather than tithes or glebe—worth £250 yearly, with about 90 acres (36 hectares) of glebe, the area of land used to support the parish church and priest. There were parish charities of a £16 10s. yearly value. At 30 yards (27 m) south from the church is a tumulus, which might have been an ancient burial mound. The population in 1851 was 210 in 43 inhabited houses. Post was processed through Leominster, which was also the nearest money order office. Commercial traders and residents included between ten and twelve farmers, the parish clerk (who was also a farm steward, parish constable, and agent to the National Live Stock Insurance Co.), a boot & shoe maker, a carpenter, and the mistress of the parochial school. An 1814-built school at Bockleton, 1.5 miles (2 km) to the south-east, also accepted labourers’ children of Laysters for no fee. Parish area in the 1850s was about 1,980 acres (800 ha), the soil being "clayey" over a subsoil of clay and marl, with some cornstone [mottled red and green limestone], rock outcrops. Crops grown were grain, cabbage, mangold wurtzel and swedes. Swedes averaged thirty tons an acre, with all crops of "splendid growth", indicating the "application of at least some of the improvements in modern agricultural science". Rosedale (grid reference SO5615361576), a property at the south of the parish is described in the 1850s as a "genteel residence, sheltered by plantations, and pleasantly situated on a sloping eminence which is terminated by a small stream and fish pond". Woonton House, today Woonton Court (grid reference SO5483562317), was the home of a doctor who practiced at Leominster. Within the house was reported an inscribed poem:

To my best my friends are free,
Free to that, and free to me;
Free to pass the harmless joke,
And the tube sedately smoak;
Free to drink just what they please,
As at home, and at their ease;
Free to speak, as free to think,
No informers with me drink;
Free to stay a night or so,
When uneasy free to go.

In 1795 the estates comprising the lordships of Heath (grid reference SO556626), a further Laysters' settlement of the time, and Woonton, had been purchased by "… Hulton the celebrated antiquarian and historian". His descendants in the 1850s resided on the property.

By the 1870s Laysters, with the union, was also in the petty sessional division, and county court district of Leominster, and in Docklow polling district. The population in 1861 was 283, and in 1871 was 279 people in 54 houses, as families or as 60 separate occupiers. Parish area was refined to 1,989 acres (805 ha), at a yearly ratable value of £2,261. There were five chief landowners, three of whom lived outside the parish: Bockleton, Cheltenham, and Yockleton near Shrewsbury. The parish was now in the Ludlow archdeaconry and the Burford West rural deanery. The living was now a vicarage, with a value, £256 13s., with a residence (at Little Laysters, grid reference SO5672362780, 400 yards (366 m) south-west from the church), and 93 acres (38 ha), of glebe. Reported was a £600 cost for the 1830s partial restoration of the church, and a further approximately £350 restoration in 1871 described as the "roof being laid open, the timber varnished, and the church repewed". The ecclesiastical of parish of St Michael and all Angels, described as being at Old Wood, Laysters, and formed in 1856, combined parts of the parishes of Laysters, Middleton on the Hill, and part of the mother parish of Tenbury in Worcestershire. Endowed charities in the 1870s then amounted to £41 12s. yearly. The parish school at Little Laysters (grid reference SO5663462938), was a public Elementary School for boys and girls with an average attendance of about 46. Resident at Laysters was the schoolmaster and the teacher at the day school. Commercial traders included the proprietors of Laysters' brick and tile works, a carpenter, a wheelwright, a thrashing machine proprietor who was also a carpenter, a shopkeeper, and the parish clerk. Listed were also ten farmers, three also a hop grower, and another a steward for the Norfolk Farmers' live stock insurance company, and for the Lancashire fire and life insurance office, and a farm bailiff.

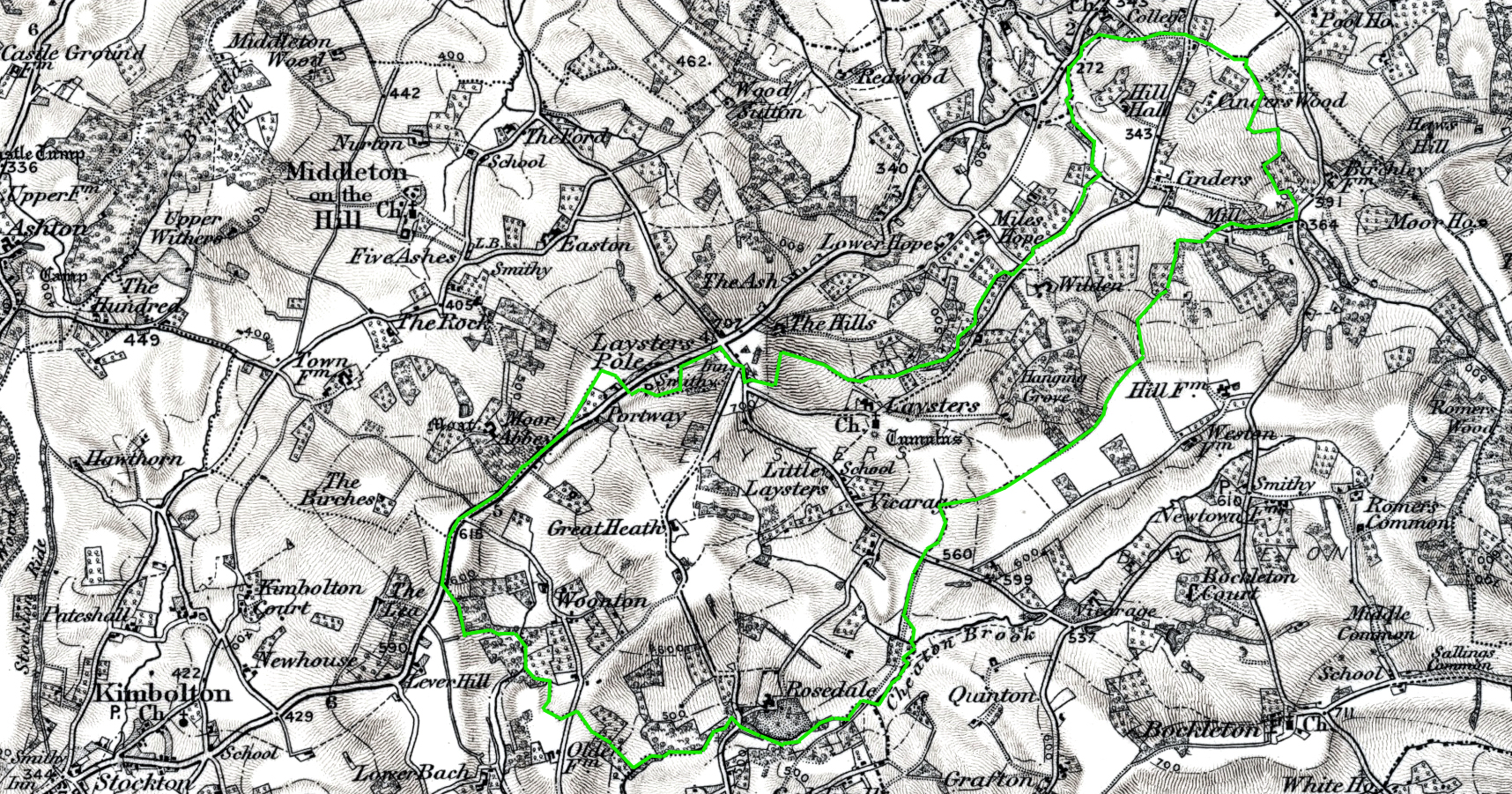
Laysters in 1897

By the 1880s Laysters is described as being in the Northern division of the county, and 5 miles (8 km) south-east from Easton Court station on the Tenbury branch of the Shrewsbury and Hereford Railway. The church of St Andrew is now described as being of Norman style, of chancel, nave, south porch, and a western tower containing three bells, with east and south windows of stained glass. The parish register dates to 1703. The ecclesiastical parish living was still a vicarage, with a tithe rent charge—typically one-tenth of the produce or profits of the land given to the rector for his services—of £254, but still with 90 acres of glebe, in the gift of Bockleton Court, outside the civil parish. In 1885 a Wesleyan chapel was being erected. The parish charities were then valued at £37 l0s. yearly. The two principal landowners lived at Bockelton and Pendleton, Lancashire. Chief crops were now listed as wheat, beans, oats, hops and apples. Population in 1881 was 238 in 53 inhabited houses, with 58 families or separate occupiers. By now, letters were collected from a letter box, with post processed through Tenbury which was then the nearest money order & telegraph office. The parochial school, for boys and girls, which was built in 1869, included a master's house, and accommodated and had an average attendance of 47 pupils. The school was then run by a schoolmistress, as was a further day school. In 1885 parish residents included the church vicar, at the vicarage, and the church curate. Commercial residents included a carpenter, two related female shopkeepers, seven farmers, and a farm bailiff. By 1890 the parish was in the now Docklow and Kimbolton polling district and electoral division of the county council. Listings now state that St Andrew's church, described as a "massive stone edifice", was restored in 1842, and again in 1870. The school was now a National School, accommodating 48, with an average attendance of 44. Tenbury, Brimfield and Leominster were the nearest money order offices, with letters collected from a letter box and processed through Tenbury, the nearest money order telegraph office and post town, and delivered by messenger. Residents in 1890s included the parish vicar at the vicarage, the parish clerk, two churchwardens, Wesleyan chapel ministers, and the schoolmaster who was also the Poor Law assistant overseer and parish clerk, and the schoolmistress. The school, with an attendance of 36, was at this time stated as being built in 1869. Commercial traders included the two shopkeepers, twelve farmers, two of whom were also a hop grower, and a farm bailiff. Population in 1891 was 200.

In 1913 the parish is described as being 4.5 miles (7 km) miles from Fencote station on the Leominster and Bromyard section of the Great Western Railway, and about 5 miles south-east from Easton Court station on the Tenbury and Bewdley branch of the Great Western Railway. Population in 1911 was 177 in the civil and 167 in the ecclesiastical parish. There was by then a post office just to the north from the parish at Laysters Pole in Middleton on the Hill. At Laysters Pole a carrier—transporter of trade goods, with sometimes people, between different settlements—connected the parish to Leominster. The schoolmaster's house had been rebuilt in 1898. The school now housed 60 pupils with an average attendance of 39. Commercial listings included a grocer at Laysters Pole post office, and twelve farmers, two of whom were also hop growers.

In 1876, the poet George Evans produced Echoes From Nature, a compilation of poems largely highlighting Laysters, such as The Great Heath Farm, Laysters, pp. 138,139, and Reflections in Laysters Churchyard, p. 24.

== Geography ==
Laysters is in north-northeast Herefordshire, on the border with Worcestershire, and approximately 15 miles (20 km) north-northeast from the city of Hereford. The nearest towns are Leominster 4.5 miles (7 km) to the south-west, and Tenbury Wells 3.5 miles (6 km) miles to the north-east. The parish, orientated north-east to south-west, is approximately 4 miles (6 km) in length, its width at the north-east 0.7 miles (1 km), at the south-west 1 mile (2 km), and at the centre 935 yards (855 m), with an area of 1,995.5 acres (807.6 ha), and an approximate height of between 300 feet (90 m) and 650 feet (200 m) above sea level. Adjacent parishes are, in Herefordshire, Pudleston at the south, Kimbolton at the south and west, and Middleton on the Hill at the north and north-west, and in Worcestershire, Tenbury at the north and north-east, and Bockleton at the east and south-east.

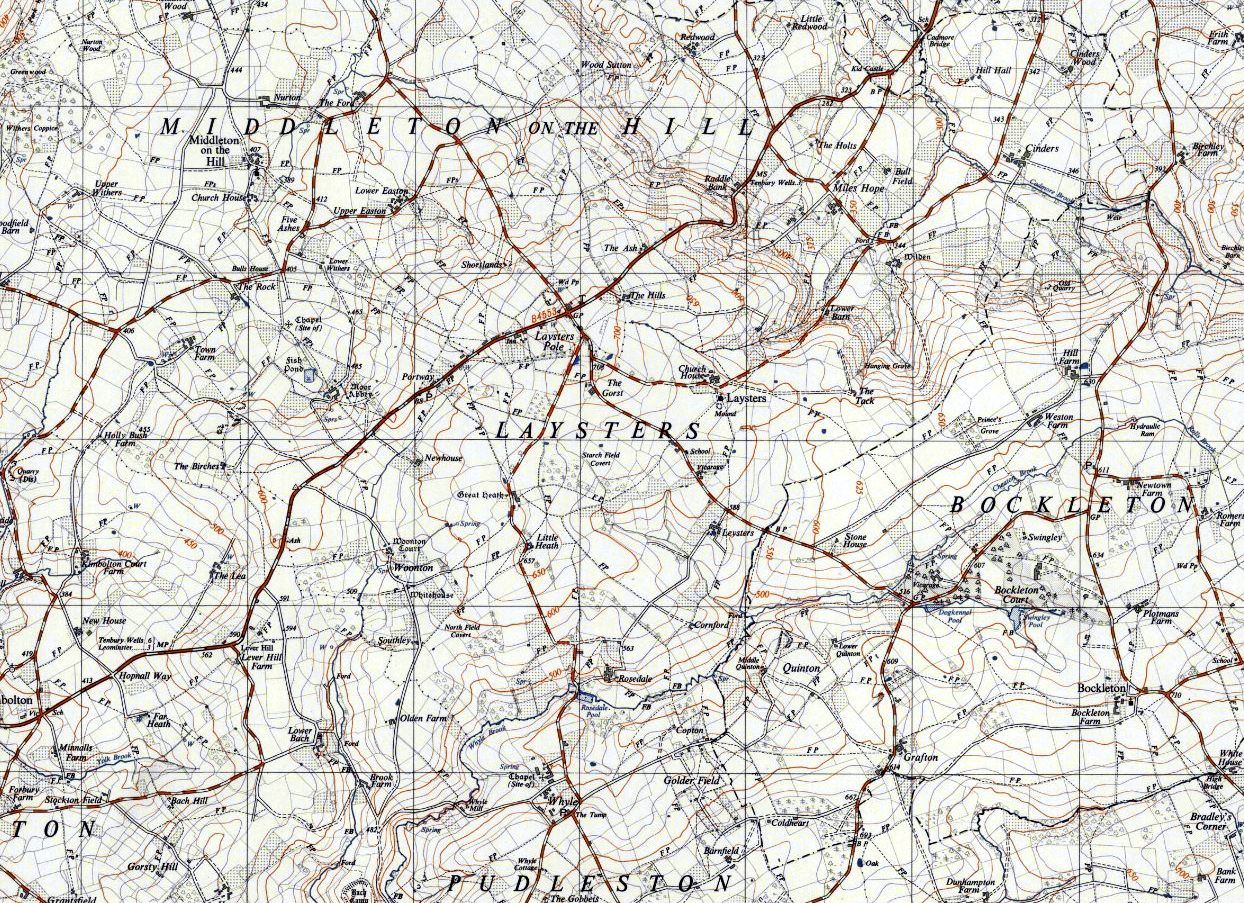
Ordnance Survey map of Laysters (1956)

The parish is rural, of farm complexes, fields, managed woodland and coppices, streams, ponds, isolated and dispersed businesses and residential properties. The depopulated village and farm hamlet of Laysters (Leysters), is at the central north (grid reference SO5683763252), with the farming hamlet of Woonton (grid reference SO5499361945), at 1.5 miles (2 km), south-west of the village and at the border with Kimbolton. Three streams form parish boundaries. The first, Whyle Brook, rises at Starch Field Covert (grid reference SO5602062890), flows south-eastwards to the border with Bockelton, at which point it is joined by a further stream from the north, then flows south-west as the parish boundary with Bockleton and then as the boundary with Pudleston, until it turns south to meet Stretford Brook at the north of Leominster parish, eventually meeting the River Lugg as tributary in Leominster town. The second, a branch of Whyle Brook, rises at the north, near Leysters Pole and at the border with Middleton on the Hill (grid reference SO5544363506), flows parallel to the A4114, then south to form a short border with Kimbolton. The third rises 380 yards (350 m) east from Leysters Pole as the stream Church House Dingle (grid reference SO5626763709), becoming Sunny Bank Dingle, as the parish boundary with Middleton on the Hill, to the confluence with Cadmere Brook (grid reference SO5820264758), a tributary of the River Teme to the north. Cadmere Brook crosses Laysters upstream to Bockleton. The only major road in the parish is the A4112, which runs as a 300 yards (274 m) stretch through a northern tip of the parish west from Leysters Pole in Middleton on the Hill and continues south-west as a boundary with Middleton and Kimbolton. A minor road running south from Leysters Pole branches (grid reference SO5601863629), into three: one road south to Whyle in Pudleston; one south-east to Bockleton; one, as Cinders Lane, arcing north-east, through Oldwood, Worcestershire, in Tenbury parish, to Tenbury Wells. A minor through-road arcs through the west of the parish, from the A4122, running through Woonton, then to Brockmanton in Puddleston. All other routes are country lanes, bridleways, farm tracks, property entrances, and footpaths.

== Governance ==
The parish is represented in the lowest tier of UK governance by the nine member Middleton on the Hill & Leysters Group Parish Council. As Herefordshire is a unitary authority—no district council between parish and county councils—the parish sends one councillor, representing the Leominster North & Rural ward, to Herefordshire County Council. Laysters is represent in the UK parliament as part of the North Herefordshire constituency.

In 1974 Laysters became part of the now defunct Leominster District of the county of Hereford and Worcester, instituted under the Local Government Act 1972. In 2002 the parish, with the parishes of Brimfield, Eye, Moreton and Ashton, Eyton, Kimbolton, Little Hereford, Luston, and Middleton on the Hill, was reassessed as part of Upton Ward which elected one councillor to Herefordshire district council.

== Community ==
Parish population in 2021 was 141. Laysters shares a village hall with Middleton. There are no shops or amenities in the parish, except the Church of St Andrew's, which is part of the Leominster Team Ministry. Businesses operating in Layster include a civil engineering company, a livestock transport company and, at Woonton, a holiday let property with attached caravanning and camping site.

Laysters falls under the Wye Valley NHS Trust; the closest hospital is Leominster Community Hospital at Leominster, with the closest major hospital Hereford County Hospital at Hereford. The nearest primary education is at St James' C.E. Primary School at Kimbolton, 3.5 miles (6 km) to the west. For secondary education the parish falls within the catchment area of Earl Mortimer College at Leominster, 5 miles (8 km) to the south-west.

The closest bus stops are under 1 mile (1.6 km) to the north at Middleton (grid reference SO5433664281), on the Wigmore to Leominster route. The closest rail connections are at Leominster railway station, 5 miles to the south-west, on the Crewe to Newport Welsh Marches Line, which also serves Hereford railway station, with further connections to Oxford on the Cotswold Line, and to Birmingham provided by West Midlands Trains.

The parish is covered by Hits Radio Herefordshire & Worcestershire on 96.7 FM and Hits Radio Birmingham, and Sunshine 855, as well as BBC Hereford and Worcester.

== Landmarks ==
Laysters contains one Grade I and four Grade II listed buildings.

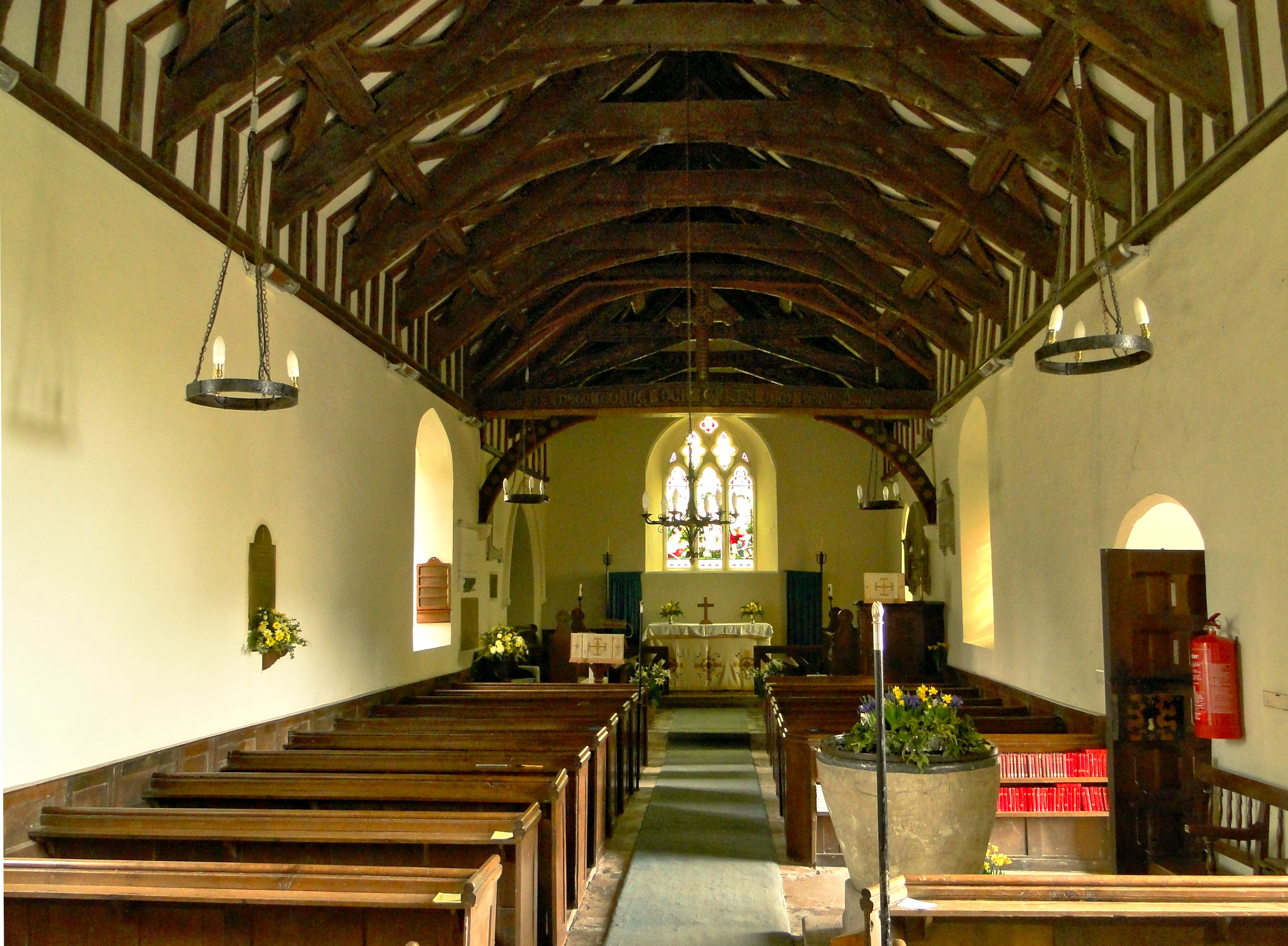
St Andrews' interior

The Grade I parish Church of St Andrew (grid reference SO5684263253), is church of local sandstone, of chancel, nave, west tower, and south porch. It dates to the 12th century, with the chancel and tower from the 13th. The church was restored in the late 19th century when a south porch and organ chamber were added, and the chancel south wall rebuilt. A stone slate roof was added in the 20th century. The tower is of three stages and llancet windows are topped with a pyramidal roof; the bell stage contains three bells. The nave at the south contains a 19th-century two-light traceried window either side of the porch, and the same on the north. Between the nave and chancel is timber chancel arch. The chancel south side shows a blind doorway beside a 19th-century trefoil headed window. The east window, also 19th century, is of three lights and traceried. The nave roof, under the 20th-century tiles, is of 14th-century trussing. The trussed chancel roof dates to the 17th century and, on its north side is an arched recessed organ room. The interior contains a 12th-century bowl font which might have originally come from Pudleston. Wall monuments date to the early 18th century, with a floor ledger slab dated 1644.

At 36 yards (33 m) south from the church is centred an earthwork (grid reference SO5683463222), the remains of a scheduled probable motte castle. Circular in form, it is about 25 yards (23 m) in diameter, varies in height from 4 feet (1 m) to 9 feet (3 m), and is surrounded by a 30 feet (9 m) wide and 3.5 feet (1 m) deep ditch. The centre of the motte was excavated in the 20th century, evidence of which remains; the earthwork, previously thought a burial barrow, revealed "ashes, charcoal, and an accumulation of rough stones, but nothing in the shape of pottery or coin was found, nor could any definite form of stone structure be determined".

Cinders (grid reference SO5858564725), is a rectangular plan sandstone farmhouse 1.5 miles (2.4 km) north-east from the church. Its main block dates to the 14th century, vertically extended and added chimney stacks in the 16th, a north wing added in the 17th, and with further development in the 19th. The 17th century north wing is timber-framed with brick infilling. The house is of two storeys, with an attic with two gabled dormer windows at the south, and a tiled roof. The interior is 17th century with major alterations in 1851. The interior contains a late 16th or early 17th-century wooden staircase, and two 17th-century panelled doors. A pre-Second World War survey by the Worcester Archaeology Service, before the property was converted to residential use, reported brick flooring as part of the oldest parts of the farm, which probably included a pre-19th-century cow house and threshing barn, with the larger elements of the farmstead chiefly 18th century which could indicate that there was an expansion of the property at that time. At 300 yards (274 m) north from Cinders, and east from Cinders Lane (grid reference SO5879065040), is the site of a fish pond, and at the south of the farm complex (grid reference SO5879065040), is the site of a possible dovecot, both post medieval and scheduled.

Great Heath Farmhouse, with an attached cider house (grid reference SO5560162658), is 1,500 yards (1,372 m) south-west from the church. The house dates to the 17th century with major remodelling in 1851, is timber-framed, partly with later added brick, with a hipped Welsh slate roof. It is of rectangular footprint with a south-east cross wing, and of two storeys with a central door with two bays of casement windows. Attached on the north side is a cider house which contains a "cider mill and press with the initials 'W W' and a date of 1771". An outbuilding dates to the late 17th or early 18th century. In a field at 100 yards (91 m) north-west from the farm complex (grid reference SO5560162658), is the scheduled site of a post-medieval quarry.

Wilden (grid reference SO5784764069), off Cinders Lane and 1,400 yards (1,280 m) north-east from the church, is a 17th-century farmhouse, with a northern cross wing added in the 18th century, and further alterations in the 19th and 20th centuries. Of sandstone, it is part timber-framed with brick infill in its rear wing. Of T-shaped plan, and of two storeys with attic and cellar, it is roofed with Welsh slate. The interior contains an original 17th-century staircase. Unlisted outbuildings are at the south-east of the house contain a 17th-century tallat (loft), the walls of stone below, and open framing above. At 150 yards (137 m) south-west from Wilden (grid reference SO5779964019), is the site of a fishpond, and in the field at 250 yards (229 m) south-east the site of a lime kiln (grid reference SO5807863898), both post medieval and scheduled.

Woonton Court (grid reference SO5483762302), 1.4 miles (2 km) south-west of the church, is an L-plan 16th-century farmhouse, extended in the 17th, 18th and 19th century, and of two storeys with roof gable dormers, a tiled roof, and chimney stacks of decorative stone. Originally a timber-framed house it was refaced with sandstone on the ground floor, the first floor (attic floor), with exposed timber-framing infilled with brick. Windows are French casement and of uPVC. On the north-east gable end are "seven rows of nesting boxes with alighting ledges". The interior contains exposed ceiling beams. At 70 yards (64 m) on the roadside south from Wooton Court is the extant and scheduled site of a post-medieval fish pool and meadow.

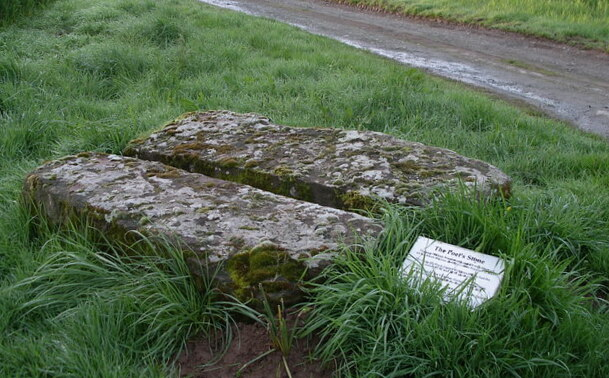
The Poets Stone, Laysters

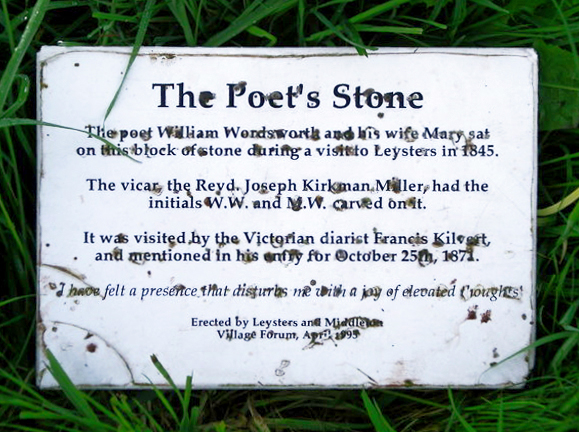
Poet's Stone plaque

The Poet's stone (grid reference SO5724663535), south-east from Sunny Bank Dingle, is a roadside memorial on Cinders Lane to William Wordsworth, and his wife Mary. Wordsworth was visiting his brother-in-law Tom Hutchinson on 22 October 1845, as part of his exploration of Herefordshire, and rested on the stone. Following this the parish vicar had inscribed the still visible initials 'WW' and 'MW' as memorial to the event.
