= Hatfield and Newhampton =

Civil parish in Herefordshire, England

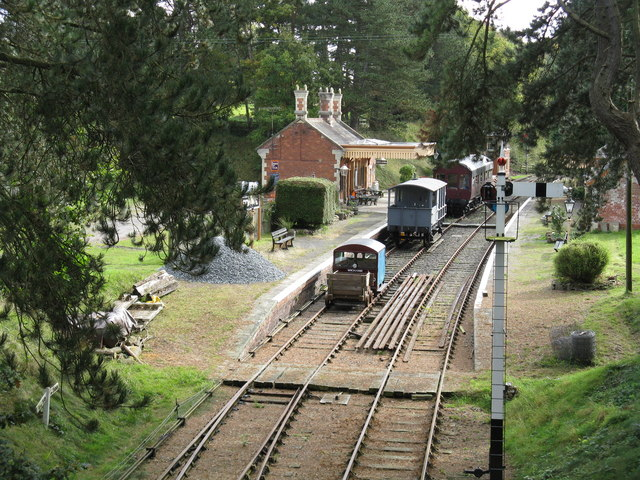
- Former Fencote railway station in 2008

- Location within Herefordshire
- OS grid reference: SO595596
  - London: 115 mi (185 km) SE
- Unitary authority: Herefordshire
- Ceremonial county: Herefordshire
- Region: West Midlands
- Country: England
- Sovereign state: United Kingdom
- Post town: Leominster
- Postcode district: HR6
- Dialling code: 01568
- Police: West Mercia
- Fire: Hereford and Worcester
- Ambulance: West Midlands
- UK Parliament: North Herefordshire

Hatfield and Newhampton is a civil parish in the county of Herefordshire, England, and is 11 miles (18 km) north from the city and county town of Hereford. The closest large town is Leominster 4 miles (6 km) to the west. The parish includes the small village of Hatfield, the former extra-parochial liberty of New Hampton, the site of former abbey lands of Fencote, the preserved Fencote railway station, and the Grade II* listed 11th-century Church of St Leonard.

== History ==
=== Medieval ===
Hatfield is a common Old English name comprising 'hāeth' with 'feld', describing a "heathy open land or open land where heather grows." The 'hampton' in Newhampton could be either the Old English 'hām-tūn' or 'hamm tūn', for a "home farm or homestead" or "farmstead in an enclosure or river-bend". The place name Fencote means a cot [small house] in a fen [marshy land]. In the Domesday Book, Hatfield is written as "Hetfelde".

Within today's Hatfield and Newhampton were three manors, two with a joint population of 17 households. They are listed in Domesday, two as Hatfield, the other Fencote. Hatfield in 1086 was centred at the west of today's parish and included the lands of Hugh de Lasne and Ralf. Hugh's land, with 8 smallholders (middle level of serf below and with less land than a villager), is defined in area by 3 lord's and 6.5 men's plough teams. He took the manor, held in 1066 from Leoffled (wife of Thorkil) under Queen Edith, and was tenant-in-chief to king William I. Ralf's land, area defined by one lord's plough team, is listed with two slaves, and held under William d'Ecouis who was tenant-in-chief to the king, and who had taken the 1066 land owned by Almer held under overlord Queen Edith. Fencote was centred 1,000 yards (900 m) south-east from today's St Leonard's Church at Hatfield village. The manor, comprising an area defined by 2 men's plough teams, held four villagers, was abbess lands. Lordship in 1066 had been held by the Leominster St Peter's Abbey under Queen Edith. St Peter's kept lordship in 1086 and was tenant-in-chief to king William I. Land at Fencote, run by the ecclesiastical community of women, comprised at least one free hide, however if any abbey or priory at Fencote existed it could have been "dissolved or abandoned before 1066." According to the Anglo-Saxon Chronicle, following Sweyn Godwinson's 1046 abduction of Eadgifu, the abbess of Leominster, and her imprisonment for a year, King Edward refused to allow a forced marriage and returned Eadgifu to Leominster, she by 1047 rehabilitated, perhaps at Fencote, by which time the priory had been dissolved. Leominster Priory was re-established in 1139. The existence of any abbey at Fencote has been debated, it perhaps being merely lands owned by Leominster Abbey. Fencote later became a parish before being absorbed in Hatfield and Newhampton, and other adjoining parishes.

=== 19th and early 20th century ===
Hatfield in 1831 (as its own parish), was described as in the Hundred of Wolphy, 7 miles (11 km) north-west from Bromyard, and containing 155 inhabitants. Ecclesiastical parish living was a perpetual curacy in the Archdeaconry and Diocese of Hereford, and supported by a yearly private benefaction of £10 and a royal bounty of £600, and under the patronage of Sir John Geers Cotterell, 1st Baronet. By 1837, the parish population had reduced to 153 inhabitants in 30 houses, and fairs were held yearly on 23 April and 18 October.

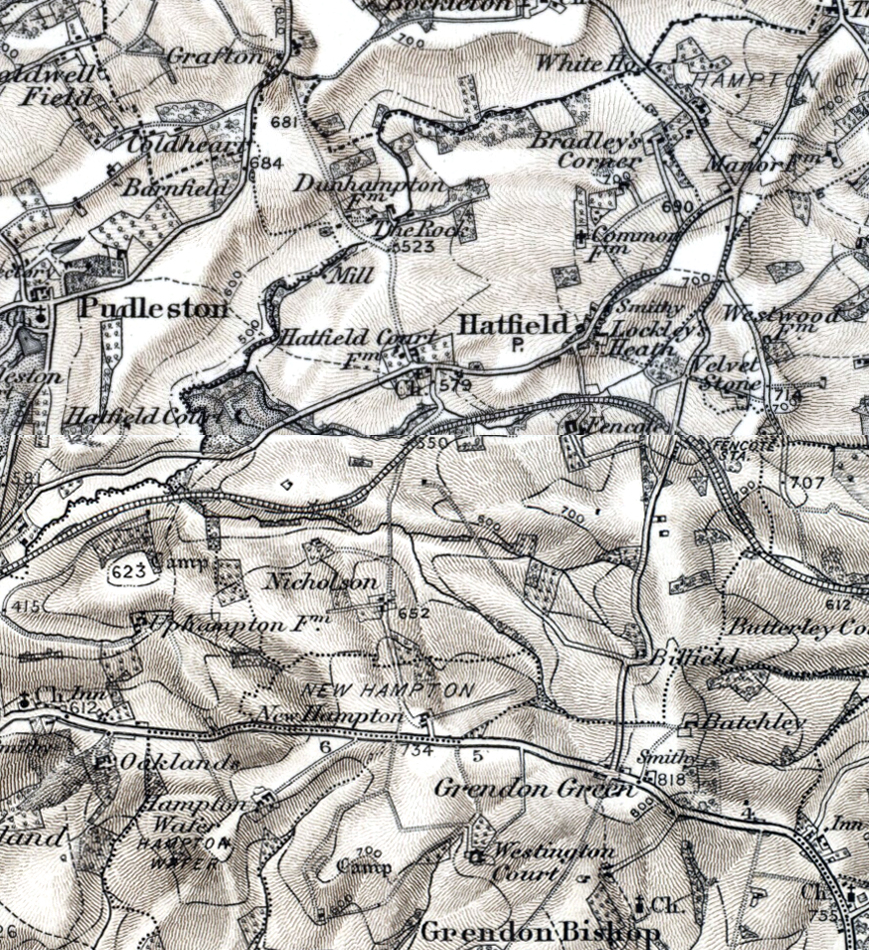
Hatfield and Newhampton in 1899

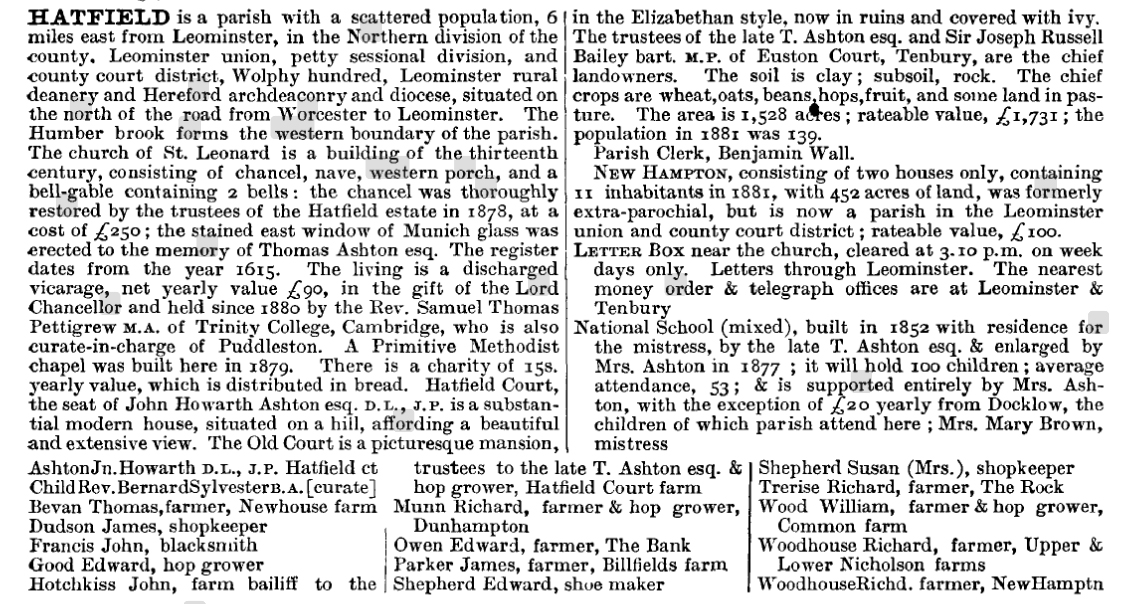
Hatfield and Newhampton in Kelly's Directory of Herefordshire, 1885

By the 1850s Hatfield, a township, was part of electoral district, petty sessional division, county court district and Union—poor relief and joint parish workhouse provision set up under the Poor Law Amendment Act 1834— of Leominster, and remained so for at least the rest of the century. Ecclesiastically the parish was part of the Archdeaconry and Diocese of Hereford. The Anglican parish church of St Leonard is described as comprising a chancel in 13th-century style, and a western porch, a chancel, a wooden bell-gable turret with two bells, monuments and a font. The living was a perpetual curracy worth £90 yearly, in gift of the Lord Chancellors Rolfe and Thesiger.

Hatfield and New Hampton (which at that point was not conjoined within the same parish), was north from the then Worcester to Leominster turnpike road. Significant residences in the parish included The Old Court which is described as a "picturesque mansion in Elizabethan style - a portion of it is in ruins". Hatfield Court, the seat of Thomas Ashton, the builder and supporter of the 1852 built parish free school for the poor, was a "modern substantial villa; the view from the hill on which it stands, is one of the most beautiful and extensive in this county"; the house, "mantled with venerable ivy", was formerly the residence of the Geers and was at the time attached to a farmhouse. Other named places were The Bank, The Rock, Upper and Lower Nicholson, The Common, and Dunhampton. New Hampton, the "extra-parochial tract in Leominster district" [until becoming a parish through the Extra-Parochial Places Act 1857], at the time was of one farm, one house, and of 144 acres (58 hectares), and by 1870 had a population of 8. A post office is listed, letters processed through Tenbury, with the nearest money order offices at Tenbury and Leominster. Population in 1851 was 173, including New Hampton. Parish area at the time was 1,528 acres (618 hectares), its soil 'clayey', with chief landowners that included the ironmaster and MP, Sir Joseph Bailey, 1st Baronet. Occupations listed included the parish priest, the parish clerk, a schoolmistress, seven farmers, a sawyer, a carpenter and joiner, and a shopkeeper who was also a boot & shoemaker.

By the 1880s the ecclesiastical parish was part of the Leominster rural deanery of the Diocese of Hereford. St Leonard's chancel, which had been restored in 1878 for £250, is described as containing "distinct traces of Saxon work, but... rebuilt in Early English and later styles", and is listed with a stained glass window of Munich glass dedicated to Thomas Ashton of Middleton, Lancashire, who had lived at Hatfield Court and who died in 1869. Remains of a Saxon doorway was noted in the north wall of the nave, while the chancel had been restored in 1878 by the trustees of the Hatfield estate. Because of restricted revenues, the incumbency had become a vicarage discharged from paying annates—first year's revenues together with one tenth of the income in all succeeding years—which were kept within the parish and were valued at £115 yearly. The vicar was also curate-in-charge at the neighbouring parish of Pudleston, later living there and becoming its rector. The parish registers were dated to 1615, and church seating capacity was 100. A charity of 15 shillings yearly was distributed in the form of bread. The Primitive Methodists had a chapel which had been built in 1869.

The civil parish, "with a scattered population", was 3 miles (5 km) north from Steens Bridge railway station on the uncompleted Worcester, Bromyard and Leominster Railway section of the Great Western Railway. In 1884, under a Local Government Order under the Divided Parishes and Poor Law Amendment Act 1882, part of Docklow parish was amalgamatedwith Hatfield. By 1887 the enlarged 1852 parish free school, complete with a residence for the schoolmistress, had become a mixed National School with a capacity for 100 pupils, and attended on average by 53-54 children, with some from neighbouring Docklow. The parish mail service, which included a pillar letter box near the church, and a post office with sub-postmaster, provided for mail processed through Leominster, with the nearest money order and telegraph offices at Tenbury in 1885, and Bredenbury in 1895.

One of the chief landowners in the 1880s was Sir Joseph Bailey, 2nd Baronet (1858 to 1899), MP, of Glanusk Park, Crickhowell in Brecon, Wales. Parish land was of clay over a subsoil of rock, on which were grown crops of wheat, oats, beans, hops, fruit, with some pasture. Population in 1881 was 139, and in 1891, 251. New Hampton, with 11 inhabitants in two houses, was of 148 acres (60 hectares). Previously extra pariochial, it was now its own civil parish in the Union, electoral and county court districts, and petty sessional division of Leominster. Residents and occupations listed in the late 1880s included, at Hatfield Court and farm, Howard Ashton the local justice of the peace and county Deputy Lieutenant, and its land agent and farm bailiff. There were between nine and ten farmers, two to four of whom were also hop growers, a further hop grower, a blacksmith, a gamekeeper, an estate carpenter, two shopkeepers, and a shoe maker who later in the decade ran the post office as sub-postmaster.

In 1903 the nave of St Leonard's was restored as a memorial to Miss Vickers of Hatfield Court. The discharged vicarage in 1909 was now valued at £125 yearly, and in 1913 at £130, and still in the gift of the Lord Chancellors: Gifford, Reid and Haldane. The parish vicar, previously living at Pudleston, was now at The Rock (house) in Hatfield, while the annual parish charity of 25 shillings was now distributed in coal. The Fencote railway station had been opened at the east of the parish, where operated the agent for the Fencote branch of the South Wales Coal Company. The National School had now become a Public Elementary School, under the Education Act 1902 which replaced the directly elected school boards with local education authorities. The school was now capable of holding 87 pupils and had an average attendance of 54 in 1909 and 41 in 1913. The post office, which was now also a telegraph office, again processed mail through Leominster, with the nearest money order office at Bredenbury. A carrier—transporter of trade goods, with sometimes people, between different settlements—operated between Hatfield and Leominster on Fridays.

Hatfield parish area, enlarged with parts of Docklow, was now 1,947 acres (788 hectares), with a 1901 civil parish population of 218, and a 1911 of 214. Ecclesiastical parish population was 191 in 1901, and in 183 in 1911. New Hampton population in 1901 was 10, and 16 in 1911. Occupations included the parish clerk, a farm bailiff to Hatfield Court, an estate carpenter, a coal company agent, the station master of Fencote Railway station, nine to ten farmers, a blacksmith, and a grocer who was also a tea dealer, saddler, harness maker, shoe repairer and tobacconist.

== Geography ==
Hatfield and Newhampton is approximately 2.5 miles (4 km) from north to south and 1.5 miles (2 km) east to west, with an area of 17.34 square kilometres (1,734 ha).

Adjacent parishes are Pudleston at the west, Docklow and Hampton Wafer at the south-west, Grendon Bishop at the south, Wacton and Thornbury at the east, Hampton Charles at the north-east, and the Worcestershire parish of Bockleton at the north. The parish is rural, of farms, fields, managed woodland and coppices, streams, isolated and dispersed businesses and residential properties, and the nucleated settlement of Hatfield. The only major route is the A44 Worcester Road which begins locally at Leominster, and runs to Bromyard at 6 miles (10 km) to the south-east of the parish, and which forms part of the southern the boundary with the parish of Grendon Bishop, and the parish of Docklow and Hampton Wafer. There are two parish through routes. The first is a minor road which runs from the south-west at Pudleston, through Hatfield, and then north-east out of the parish into, and forming part of the boundary with, Hampton Charles. From this, a minor road from the junction at the church runs north to the hamlet of Grafton in Worcestershire. The second through route runs through the east of the parish from Hampton Charles at the north to Grendon Bishop at the south. Other routes are bridleways, access roads, farm tracks, and footpaths, one of which is on the line of the previous railway.

The main watercourse of the parish is the Humber Brook—a tributary to the River Lugg 4 miles (6 km) to the west at Ford and Stoke Prior—which flows in part through the north-west, but for its major distance forms the boundary with Pudleston at the west, and Bockleton at the north. Six streams flowing to the Humber Brook drain the parish from sources in the higher land at the east. The most northerly, 850 yards (800 m) in length, flows north at the north-east and forms the parish boundary with Hampton Charles. To the north from Hatfield are two streams to the north-west from the road to Grafton. The most northerly, its source between Common Farm and Bank Farm, where it is dammed to form two ponds, is of 1,200 yards (1,000 m) and flows through the woodland margin of Long Dingle as it joins Humber Brook. The southerly, of 1,000 yards (900 m), flows from a source in woodland, 900 yards (800 m) to the north-east from the church, where it is dammed to form two ponds, and a further pond-dammed farther to the west. At 250 yards (200 m) south from the church is a 1.5 miles (2 km) stream flowing the whole width of the parish and largely through woodland margins, and partly following the footpath of the abandoned track of the old railway line north from Fencote Abbey (farm). At the extreme south of the parish flows a 1,500 yards (1,000 m) stream with woodland margins, joining the Humber Brook at the west. It splits upstream into two tributaries, one flowing from the east at the parish boundary, the other from the south-east, where it is part the parish boundary with Grendon Bishop, and is dammed to form three ponds while feeding a further adjacent pond.

== Governance ==
The parish is represented in the lowest tier of UK governance by two elected councillors on the six-member Hatfield and District Group Parish Council which also includes councillors from the parish of Pudleston, and the parish of Docklow and Hampton Wafer. As Herefordshire is a unitary authority—no district council between parish and county councils—the parish sends one councillor, representing the Hampton Ward, to Herefordshire County Council. Hatfield and Newhampton is represent in the UK Parliament as part of the North Herefordshire constituency.

In 1974 Hatfield and Newhampton, as 'Hatfield', became part of the now defunct Leominster District of the county of Hereford and Worcester, instituted under the 1972 Local Government Act. In 2002 the parish, with the parishes of Docklow and Hampton Wafer, Pudleston, Ford and Stoke Prior, Grendon Bishop, Hampton Charles, Hope under Dinmore, Humber, and Newton, was reassessed as part of Hampton Court Ward which elected one councillor to Herefordshire district council.

== Community ==
Population was 188 in 2001, and the same in 2011.

Hatfield and Newhampton falls under the Wye Valley NHS Trust; the closest hospital is Leominster Community Hospital at Leominster, with the closest major hospital Hereford County Hospital at Hereford. Nearest primary education is at Bredenbury Primary School at Bredenbury, 2 miles (3 km) south-east, with the parish part of the catchment area of Stoke Prior Primary School, 4 miles (6 km) to the south-west. For secondary education the parish falls within the catchment area of Earl Mortimer College at Leominster, 3.5 miles (6 km) to the west.

The Anglican parish church in Hatfield is St Leonard's, in the Deanery of Leominster and the Diocese of Hereford, and is part of the Leominster Team Ministry. The church is supported by Herefordshire Historic Churches Trust. At 1,000 yards (900 m) west from the church is a holiday caravan park, and 1,400 yards (1,000 m) south is a farm bed & breakfast establishment. At the north-west edge of the parish is an internet-based outdoor country apparel company, and at the eastern edge at Bilfield a farm-based secure self-storage facility at which is a mobile phone telecommunications mast.The nearest community or village hall is at Pudleston, less than 1.5 miles (2 km) north-west, and Bredenbury, 2 miles (3 km) to the south-east.

Bus stops for the Leominster to Ledbury route are on the A44 Worcester Road, 1 mile (2 km) to the south from Hatfield. The closest rail connections are at Leominster railway station, 5 miles (8 km) to the west, on the Crewe to Newport Welsh Marches Line which also serves Hereford railway station, 13 miles (20 km) to the south, with further connections to Oxford on the Cotswold Line, and to Birmingham provided by West Midlands Trains.

== Landmarks ==
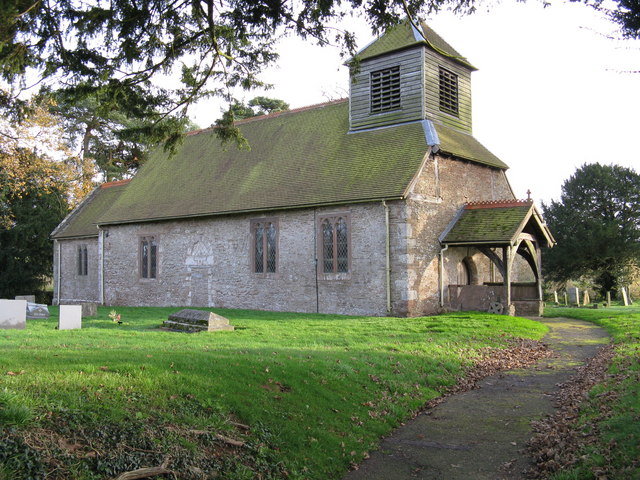
St Leonard's Church

Within the parish are one Grade II* and five Grade II listed buildings and structures, one of which is also one of three scheduled monuments.

The Grade II* listed (11 June 1959), Church of St Leonard dates to, and shows remnants of, the 11th century, with further rebuilds in the 14th century and 1723. The church was restored in 1878. St Leonard's is of sandstone construction with weatherboard cladding to the late 19th-century bell turret, and comprises a chancel, with 13th-century chancel arch, nave and west porch. On the north side of the nave is a blocked 11th-century doorway with tympanum; the west door entrance dates to the 19th century. The porch contains some 14th-century elements, and the plain tub-shaped font is 13th century. Monumental wall tablets in the chancel date to the 17th century.

Other listed buildings are Grade II. Dunhampton farmhouse (listed 11 June 1959), dates to the 16th century with later additions to the 17th and 18th. The house, two storey and T-plan, is timber-framed with infilled brick nogging, with casement windows. The interior contains 'cross-beam ceilings in two ground floor rooms [and a] large open fireplace'. Lower Nicholson Farmhouse (listed 22 August 1996), dates at least to the 17th century, and is of three bays, two storeys, and timber-framed with stone tile roofs. The centre bay may have originated as a hall house. The interior contains timber beams and a 19th-century fireplace incorporating an oven. Lower Nicholson Farmhouse was owned by the Welsh clergyman, artist and poet John Dyer (1699-1757). Three ancillary buildings are also listed adjacent to Lower Nicholson Farmhouse: an 18th-century barn and byre (cow shelter); a mid-19th-century L-plan cattle shelter; and a mid-19th-century cart shed and granary, of 3-bay open front, timber-framed with brick nogging, and granary above.

The 154 miles (248 km) Herefordshire Trail runs through the parish, locally east to west from Pudleston to Thornbury.

Fencote railway station, at the east of the parish and 900 yards south-east from Hatfield village, is a restored station, previously on the Worcester, Bromyard and Leominster Railway which closed on 15 September 1952. The restoration includes sections of the original track and a signal box.

Approximately 1,000 yards (900 m) south-east from St Leonard's Church at Fencote Abbey Farm (52.2282°N 2.59524°W) is the site of former abbey land.
