= Pudleston =

Village in Herefordshire, England

Coordinates: 52.2345°N 2.63948°W

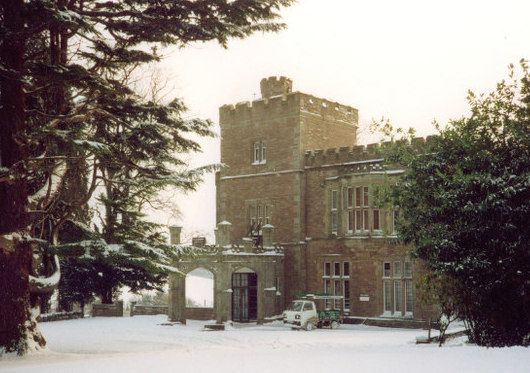
- Puddleston Court

- Location within Herefordshire
- OS grid reference: SO564597
  - London: 120 mi (190 km) SE
- Unitary authority: Herefordshire
- Ceremonial county: Herefordshire
- Region: West Midlands
- Country: England
- Sovereign state: United Kingdom
- Post town: Leominster
- Postcode district: HR6
- Dialling code: 01568
- Police: West Mercia
- Fire: Hereford and Worcester
- Ambulance: West Midlands
- UK Parliament: North Herefordshire

Pudleston (or Pudlestone), is a small village and civil parish (alternatively Pudleston-cum-Whyle), in the county of Herefordshire, England, and is 13 miles (20 km) north from the city and county town of Hereford. The closest large town is Leominster 4 miles (6 km) to the west. At Pudleston is the c.1200 Church of St Peter, and the 1846 Tudor-Gothic Pudleston Court.

== History ==
According to A Dictionary of British Place Names and The Concise Oxfordshire Dictionary of English Place-names Pudleston derives from the Old English 'pytell' with 'dūn' meaning "hill of the mouse-hawk or of a man called Pytell". Listed in the 1086 Domesday Book as 'Pillesdune', it was written in 1212 as 'Putlesdone', in 1242 as 'Puttlesdune', and in 1249 as 'Pudlesdun'. Domesday describes Pudleston as a manor in the Wolfhay Hundred of Herefordshire, and with 14 households. There were five smallholders (middle level of serf below a villager), eight slaves, and a Frenchman. There was ploughland area defined by two lord's and two men's plough teams. In 1066, at the time of the Norman Conquest, Wulfward was the manorial lord, this later in 1086 passing to Hugh de Lacy, subordinate to Roger de Lacy the tenant-in-chief to king William I.

In 1858 and 1909 Pudleston is described as a civil parish which included the hamlet of Brockmanton and the township of Whyle, with scattered population, on the north of the road (a turnpike in 1858), from Leominster to Worcester, with its boundary at the south formed by the Humber Brook, and about 2.5 miles (4 km) north-east from Steens Bridge station on the Leominster, Bromyard and Ledbury and Worcester section of the Great Western Railway. It was in the Northern division of Herefordshire, the Wolphy hundred, and under the Union,—poor relief and joint parish workhouse provision set up under the Poor Law Amendment Act 1834—petty sessional division and county court district of Leominster.

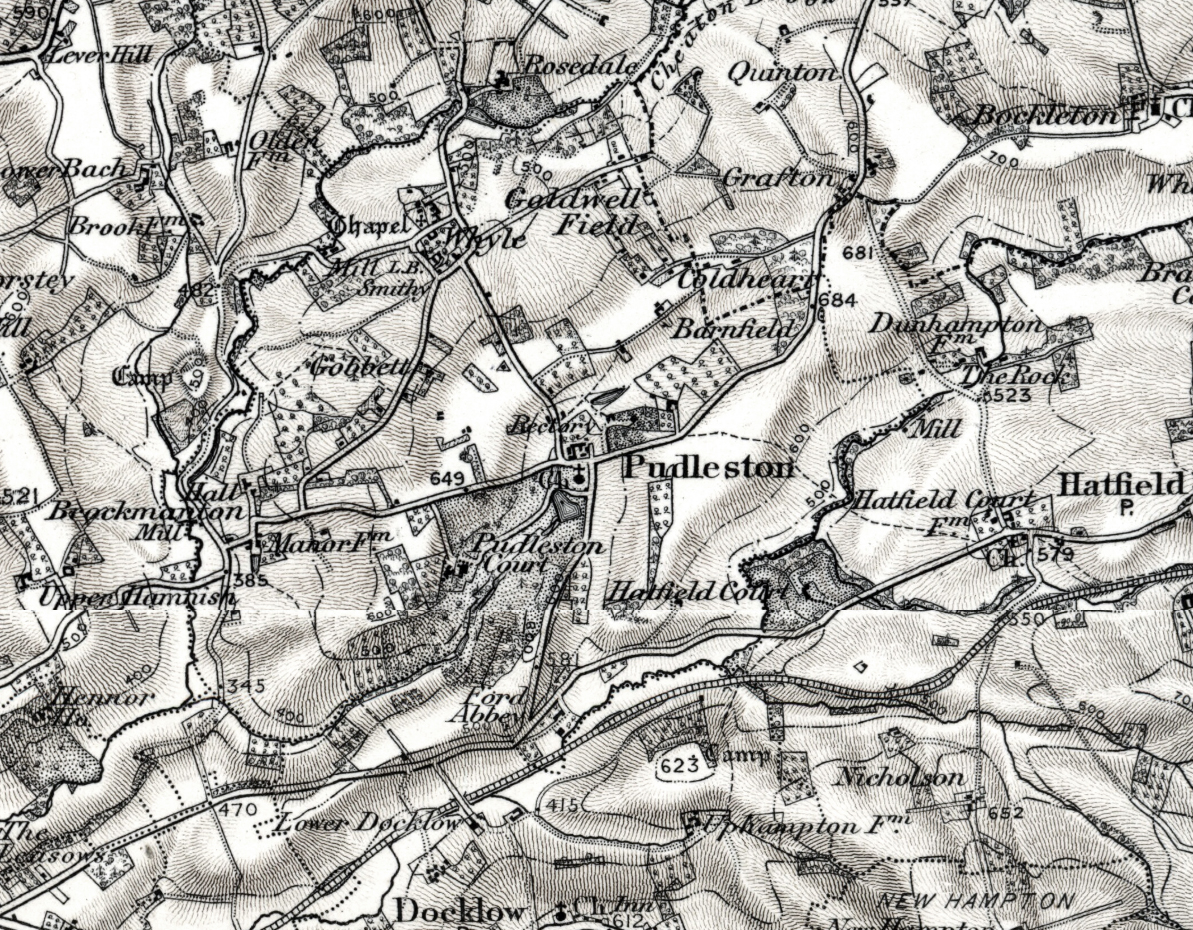
Pudleston in 1898-99

Pudleston was in the Leominster rural deanery of the Archdeaconry and Diocese of Hereford. St Peter's Church, which had been rebuilt in 1813, comprised a chancel, a nave of three bays and a clerestory, aisles, a south porch, and four bells, one of which was previously in the parish hamlet of Whyle, in a "low" western tower with a spire. The south aisle with arcade and clerestory was built in 1850 for £916, and the chancel restored in 1857 for £615, by Henry Woodyer. The chancel is floored with encaustic tiles and contains a carved stone reredos, a piscina, and a sedilia. All windows in the church contain stained glass. The church had seating for 200 people, and held a parish register dating to 1560. The 1909 incumbent's living was a rectory with a net yearly income of £300 in 1858 and £180 in 1909, and 100 acres (40 ha) of glebe—an area of land used to support a parish priest—and a rectory house, the rector also being the curate—assistant to the parish priest—of Ducklow. The living was in the gift of Elias Chadwick of Pudleston Court in 1858, and George Ernest Wright JP in 1909 who was the lord of the manor, the chief parish landowner, and also of Pudleston Court which was described as a "handsome modern mansion, in the castellated style, standing on an eminence in a beautifully undulating park of over 200 acres (81 ha), ornamented with shrubberies, plantations and sheets of water," and "commanding "beautiful and extensive views of a rich agricultural county, and the Welsh mountains." Between 1900 and 1999 Pudleston Court was a school

The parish, with a population of 316 in 1851, and 212 in 1901, had a water area of 9 acres (4 ha), and land area of 1,769 acres (716 ha), the soil of clay and loam over a subsoil of gravel, on which were grown wheat, beans, hops, clover and apples, with pasture. Parish hamlets were Whyle and Brockmanton. Whyle, less than 1 mile (1.6 km) to the north-west from the church, is noted as once containing an "ancient" chapel dedicated to St John, its site being within an orchard but of which no trace remained. Brockmanton, 1 mile to the west from the church, is described as "pleasantly situated near the Stamford Brook," and containing the two "respectable" farmhouses of Brockmanton Hall and Brockmanton Court. At the southern edge of the parish is the farmhouse of Ford Abbey, which had been in religious possession connected to Leominster Priory; in 1858 there remained evidence of a chapel. The parish had no post office; a letter box was near the church rectory residence, the mail processed through Leominster which was the nearest money order office. A National School in 1858 accommodated 45 pupils. A new mixed public elementary school had been built in 1876 for 51 pupils; its average attendance in 1909 was 34. Land of one acre had been bought in 1873 for £56 by the chief landowner of Brockmanton, the rector, and churchwardens to build a school "for the education of poor persons in the parish of Pudleston in the principles of the Church of England." The following year the school had been built, run by a headmistress who taught 51 pupils. The school closed in 1982, with the building converted to a village hall. Commercial occupations at Pudleston in 1858 included ten farmers, a schoolmaster, two shoe makers, two millers, a wheelwright, blacksmith, tailor, the schoolmaster and the parish clerk. In 1909 these included nine farmers, three of whom were a cottage farmers, and one who grew hops, two carriers—transporters of trade goods, with sometimes people, between different settlements—a shopkeeper, and a gardener. At Whyle there were two farmers, two shopkeepers, a blacksmith, a carrier, and a gamekeeper to the lord of the manor. At Brockmanton was a farmer & hop grower at Brockmanton Court. A parish shop and a post office closed in 1977.

Elias Chadwick (1813 - 1875), born in Lancashire, was a director of the Shrewsbury and Hereford and Leominster and Kington railways, and was a Herefordshire Deputy Lieutenant, High sheriff, Freemason, public benefactor, and a Lancashire and Herefordshire Justice of the Peace. He bought Puddleston Court, an English country house, in 1845 after the death of its previous owner, the rector of Pudleston and curate of the adjacent parish of Hatfield. Over the following two years Chadwick rebuilt the house, in pink sandstone with a battlemented roof line, to the designs of Liverpool architect J.T. Brearley. In the late 20th century Pudleston Court was the home of Albert Heijn Jr., a Dutch supermarket entrepreneur, until his death in 2011.

== Geography ==
Pudleston parish is approximately 2 miles (3 km) from north to south and 2.5 miles (4 km) east to west, with an area of 7.19 square kilometres (719 ha) to a height of 500–600 feet above sea level. Adjacent parishes are Leysters at the north, Kimbolton at the west, Leominster at the south-east, Docklow and Hampton Wafer at the south, Hatfield and Newhampton at the south-east, and the Worcestershire parish of Bockleton at the north-east.

The parish is rural, of farms, fields, managed woodland and coppices, streams, ponds, isolated and dispersed businesses and residential properties, and the nucleated settlements of Pudleston village at the centre, and the hamlets of Whyle at the north and Brockmanton at the west. A minor road runs through Pudleston village and Brockmanton hamlet, from Bockleton beyond the parish at the east, to a junction at Brockhampton where it meets the road from the A4112 road in Leysters at the north to the major A44 Leominster to Bromyard road in Stoke Prior at the south-west, A minor road from Pudleston runs northwards, through Whyle, eventually to the A4112, and southwards to an intersection at the extreme south of the parish with a road which runs north-east and then beyond the parish to the village of Hatfield. All other routes are country lanes, bridleways, farm tracks and footpaths. Within the parish is the source for the Stretford Brook, a tributary of the River Arrow, which rises to the north-east of Pudleston village, the south-west of which it forms a lake in the grounds of Pudleston Court, then flows south-west through the woodland of Pudleston Dingle where it defines the Docklow with Hampton Wafer, and then the Leominster boundaries. The Whyle Brook, a tributary of Stretford Brook, flows from the north-east to the south-west, and forms the complete western boundary with the parish of Kimbolton, and the northern with the parish of Leysters, in which it becomes the Cheaton Brook, which feeds two closely adjacent lakes divided between Pudleston and Leysters, in the grounds of Rosedale house. The Humber Brook, a tributary of the River Lugg at the south-east of the parish, forms the complete boundary with Hatfield, and part boundary with Docklow and Hampton Wafer.

== Governance ==
The parish, its legal name Pudleston-cum-Whyle, is represented in the lowest tier of UK governance by two elected councillors on the six-member Hatfield and District Group Parish Council which also includes councillors from the parish of Docklow and Hampton Wafer, and the parish of Hatfield and Newhampton. As Herefordshire is a unitary authority—no district council between parish and county councils—the parish sends one councillor, representing the Hampton Ward, to Herefordshire County Council. Pudleston is represent in the UK Parliament as part of the North Herefordshire constituency.

In 1974 Pudleston became part of the now defunct Leominster District of the county of Hereford and Worcester, instituted under the Local Government Act 1972. In 2002 the parish, with the parishes of Docklow and Hampton Wafer, Ford and Stoke Prior, Grendon Bishop, Hampton Charles, Hatfield and Newhampton, Hope under Dinmore, Humber, and Newton, was reassessed as part of Hampton Court Ward which elected one councillor to Herefordshire district council.

== Community ==
Parish population was 193 in 2001, and 166 in 2011.

Pudleston falls under the Wye Valley NHS Trust; the closest hospital is Leominster Community Hospital at Leominster, with the closest major hospital Hereford County Hospital at Hereford. Nearest primary education is at St James C.E. Primary School at Kimbolton, 3 miles (5 km) west, and Stoke Prior Primary School at Stoke Prior, 3 miles south-east. For secondary education the parish falls within the catchment area of Earl Mortimer College at Leominster, 4.5 miles (7 km) to the west.

The Anglican parish church is St Peter's, in the Deanery of Leominster and the Diocese of Hereford, and is part of the Leominster Team Ministry. The church is supported by Herefordshire Historic Churches Trust. To the north from the church is the village hall, and to the south-west, at Pudleston Court, are holiday cottages. A craft windsor chair and furniture maker operates at Brockmanton, and a civil engineering contractors company, and an Industrial equipment supplier are based at the extreme north-east of the parish.

The closest bus stops are 1 mile (1.6 km) to the south on the A44, for the Leominster to Ledbury route. The closest rail connections are at Leominster railway station, 4 miles (6 km) to the west, on the Crewe to Newport Welsh Marches Line which also serves Hereford railway station, 13 miles (21 km) to the south, with further connections to Oxford on the Cotswold Line, and to Birmingham provided by West Midlands Trains .

== Landmarks ==
Within the parish are eight Grade II and one Grade II* listed buildings, including a 12th-century church, a 19th-century English country house, a house and two farmhouses variously dating from the early 16th to mid-18th century, and two barns dating to the 17th.

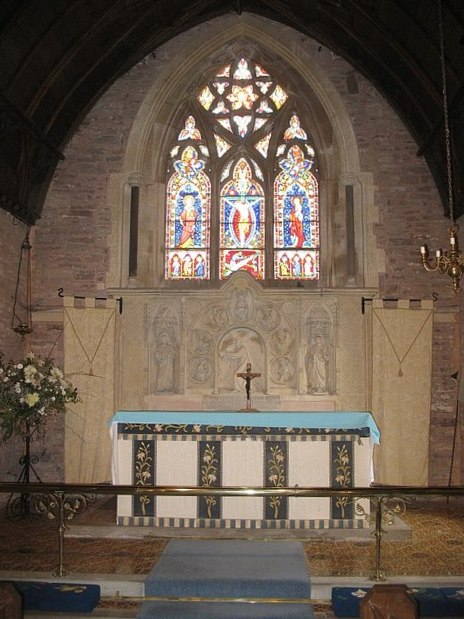
Henry Woodyer east window in St Peter's chancel

The Grade II* Church of St Peter and comprises a tower, chancel, nave, north and south aisles, a north vestry, and a south porch. The three-stage tower dates to c.1200, the chancel the 13th century, the north aisle to 1813, and the south aisle to 1850. The chancel was renovated in 1857; the vestry and south porch added in the late 19th century. Constructed of sandstone, the roof is of part slate and stone tiles, with that of the three stage tower's pyramidic roof and broach spire of wood shingle. The tower lancet windows date to the early 13th century, and the west door portal with restored tympanum, to the 12th. The windows of the aisles, porch, and vestry are 19th century. Below the 1857 three-light traceried chancel east window, designed by Henry Woodyer, is a carved stone reredos. The aisles' arcades define three bays. Fixtures and fittings include four bells. One bell is from the previous chapel at Whyle, inscribed with "Johannes amice xpe," and another with "Sancte Petre ora pro nobis" (Saint Peter pray for us), both 15th century from the Worcester foundry. A third bell is by Clibury and dated 1673, and a fourth by John Finch and dated 1639.

Pudleston Court, Grade II and 800 yards (730 m) south-west from the church, is an English country house of two-storeys with attic in Tudor-Gothic style built for Elias Chadwick, and begun in 1846 by Liverpool architect J.T. Brearley. The house is of pink sandstone with grey stone quoins and a battlemented parapet, polygonal battlemented turrets, octagonal chimney stacks, and a battlemented clock tower. The window surrounds are stone and chiefly mullioned, some being bay windows running over the two storeys. The interior is 19th century, with principal rooms around a central hall with panel ceiling and an inglenook within a Jacobethan style chimneypiece. At 140 yards (130 m) south from the church is the drive gateway to Pudleston Court, either side of which is an 1846-built two-storey gatehouse lodge, these joined by a central arch incorporating a pedestrian gate both sides of the main gate. The architecture, with mullioned windows, octagonal turrets and battlemented parapets, reflects the Tudor-Gothic style of the house.
