= Docklow and Hampton Wafer =

Civil parish in Herefordshire, England

Coordinates: 52.2135°N 2.64169°W

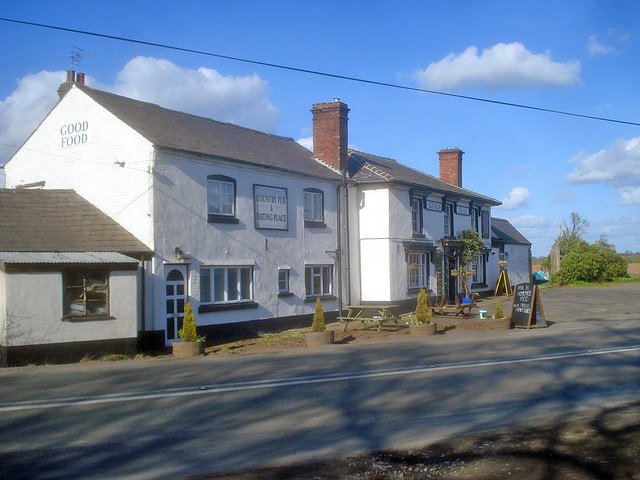
- The Kings Head

- Location within Herefordshire
- OS grid reference: SO562574
  - London: 120 mi (190 km) SE
- Unitary authority: Herefordshire
- Ceremonial county: Herefordshire
- Region: West Midlands
- Country: England
- Sovereign state: United Kingdom
- Post town: Leominster
- Postcode district: HR6
- Dialling code: 01568
- Police: West Mercia
- Fire: Hereford and Worcester
- Ambulance: West Midlands
- UK Parliament: North Herefordshire

Docklow and Hampton Wafer (alternatively Docklow and Hampton Wafre), is a civil parish in the county of Herefordshire, England, and is 11 miles (18 km) north from the city and county town of Hereford. The closest large town is Leominster 4 miles (6 km) to the west. The parish contains the remains of Uphampton Camp, a probable Iron Age hillfort, and the Church of St Bartholomew, in part dating to the 12th and 13th century.

== History ==
According to A Dictionary of British Place Names and The Concise Oxford Dictionary of English Place-names Docklow derives from the Old English 'docc' with 'hlāw' meaning "mound or hill where docks or water-lilies grow", and was written in 1291 as "Dockelawe". Hampton Wafer in the Domesday Book is written as "Hantone", and in 1286 as "Hampton Waffre". Hampton, with one of three possible derivations, for Herefordshire derives from the Old English 'hamm' with 'tūn' meaning 'home farm' or homestead'. The Hampton Wafer part of the parish is described in Domesday as a manor in the Leominster Hundred of Herefordshire. The manor had no recorded population, but its ploughland area was defined by one lord's plough team. In 1066 Bruning was lord of the manor, under the overlordship of Queen Edith. After the Norman Conquest in 1086 the manor came under the lordship of the marcher lord Roger de Lacy as tenant-in-chief to king William I.

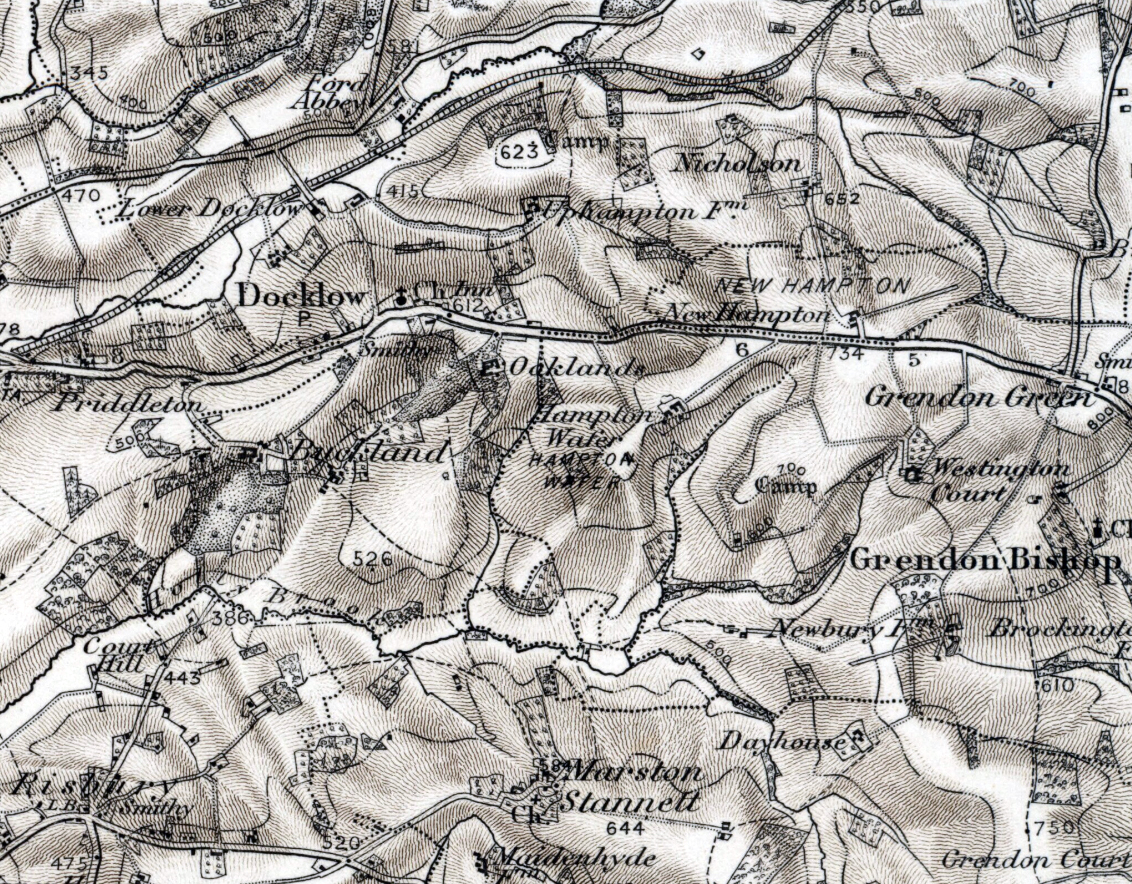
Docklow and Hampton Wafer in 1898

In 1909 Docklow is described as a parish in the Wolphy hundred and on the Bromyard and Leominster road, and 1.5 miles (2 km) west from Steens Bridge station on the Leominster to Bromyard section of the Great Western Railway. The parish was in the Northern division of Herefordshire, and was in the Union,—poor relief and joint workhouse provision set up under the Poor Law Amendment Act 1834—Police court and County court district of Leominster.

The ecclesiastical parish was in the rural deanery of Leominster and the Archdeaconry and Diocese of Hereford. St Bartholomew's Church, is noticed as an "edifice in Early English style" with a "low" western tower with spire and a bell, a chancel and nave sharing the same roof, and a south porch. In 1880 the whole of the church except for the lower part of the tower and the north wall was "pulled down", and rebuilt at a cost of £1.100, to the designs of Thomas Nicholson, which included a new stained glass east window. Its parish registers dated to 1584, and there was seating for 80 people. The incumbent's living was a rectory joined with the parish of Stoke Prior with a joint value of £204 yearly, 15 acres (6 ha) of glebe—an area of land used to support a parish priest—and a rectory house. The rector, who resided at Stoke Prior, was assisted by a curate who was also the rector of Pudleston. A "small British camp" was at Uphampton, "a little to the north" of the village. The chief landowners lived at Buckland, while John Stanhope Arkwright, great-great grandson of industrialist Sir Richard Arkwright, was the lord of the manor.

In 1884 a Local Government Board Order transferred Fencot from the parish to Hatfield, and under the provisions of the Divided Parishes Act Park Farm was transferred to Thornbury. The parish, with a 1901 population of 158, had an area of 1,285 acres (520 ha) of clay soil over a subsoil of gravel and rock, on which were grown wheat, barley, oats, hops and apples. Hampton Wafer, part of the parish, was previously a parish in its own right, and in 1909 was of 333 acres (135 ha) with a population of 15. Docklow and Hampton Wafer had its own post and telegraph office, with mail arriving from Leominster from where it was dispatched by cycle. The nearest money order office was at Bredenbury. Parish children were taught at Hatfield. Residents included Captain Edward Leonard Aspinall, Deputy lieutenant and Justice of the peace, of Buckland. Commercial trades and occupations included three farmers, one of whom was also a hop grower, two bailiffs, a carpenter who was also a pump manufacturer, a blacksmith who was also the parish sexton, and the licensee of the King's Head public house. At Hampton Wafer was a farmer who was also a hop grower.

Docklow was a focal point in the investigation of the murder of Simon Dale in 1987 when Dale's ex-wife, Baroness Susan de Stempel, who lived in a rented cottage in the village, was visited and questioned by police who also discovered de Stempel had been defrauding and robbing the estate of her aunt, Lady Margaret Illingworth, whom she invited to live here on pretext of a holiday before sending her on to a residential home where she had died in 1986. The murder was never solved but de Stempel was jailed for her fraudulent activities.

== Geography ==
Docklow and Hampton Wafer is approximately 2 miles (3 km) from north to south and 2.5 miles (4 km) east to west, with an area of 16.57 square kilometres (1,657 ha).

Adjacent parishes are Leominster at the north-west, Pudleston at the north, Hatfield and Newhampton at the north-east, Grendon Bishop at the south-east, Humber at the south, and Ford and Stoke Prior at the west. The parish is rural, of farms, fields, managed woodland and coppices, streams, lakes and ponds, isolated and dispersed businesses and residential properties, and the nucleated settlements of the small village of Docklow at the centre of the parish, and the hamlet of Buckland at the south-west. Flowing from the north-east and through the north of the parish is the Humber Brook, a tributary of the River Lugg which it joins 3 miles (5 km) to the south-west. At the north-west of the parish the Humber Brook feeds Docklow Pools, a complex of angling lakes. At the south of the parish, and forming the boundary with Humber, is Holly Brook, a tributary of Humber Brook, which rises in Pencombe with Grendon Warren at the south-east, and flows through the extreme south-east of the parish. Holly brook is fed by three streams, flowing north to south and which rise in the higher ground of the centre of the parish, two of which form the east and west parish boundaries. The only major route is the A44 Worcester Road, running the whole length of the centre of the parish, which begins locally at Leominster, and runs to Bromyard at 6 miles (10 km) to the east. The only other through route in the parish is a minor road at the north, which links the A44 at the west, to Pudleston and Hatfield at the north and north-east. All other routes are bridleways, farm tracks and footpaths, and cul-de-sac or circuitous country lanes.

== Governance ==
The parish is represented in the lowest tier of UK governance by two elected councillors on the six-member Hatfield and District Group Parish Council which also includes councillors from the parish of Pudleston, and the parish of Hatfield and Newhampton. As Herefordshire is a unitary authority—no district council between parish and county councils—the parish sends one councillor, representing the Hampton Ward, to Herefordshire County Council. Pudleston is represent in the UK Parliament as part of the North Herefordshire constituency.

In 1974 Docklow and Hampton Wafer, as separate parishes, became part of the now defunct Leominster District of the county of Hereford and Worcester, instituted under the Local Government Act 1972. In 2002 the parish, with the parishes of Pudleston, Ford and Stoke Prior, Grendon Bishop, Hampton Charles, Hatfield and Newhampton, Hope under Dinmore, Humber, and Newton, was reassessed as part of Hampton Court Ward which elected one councillor to Herefordshire district council.

== Community ==
Population was 214 in 2001, and 236 in 2011.

Docklow and Hampton Wafer falls under the Wye Valley NHS Trust; the closest hospital is Leominster Community Hospital at Leominster, with the closest major hospital Hereford County Hospital at Hereford.

Nearest primary education is at St James C.E. Primary School at Kimbolton, 2 miles (3 km) north-west, and Stoke Prior Primary School at Stoke Prior, 2 miles west. For secondary education the parish falls within the catchment area of Earl Mortimer College at Leominster, 3.5 miles (6 km) to the west.

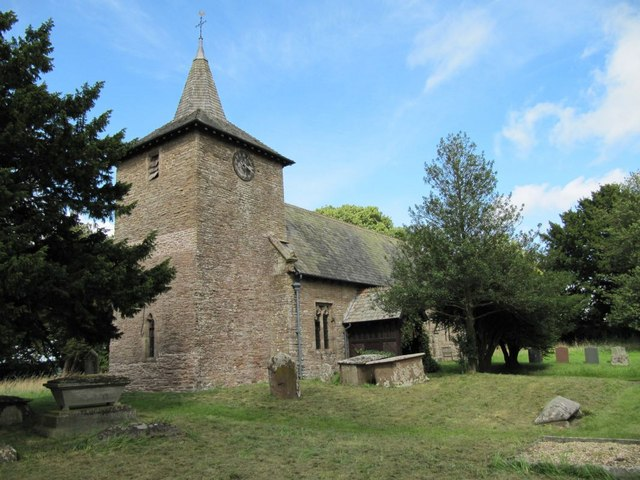
St Bartholomew's Church

The Anglican parish church, on the A44, is St Bartholomew's, in the Deanery of Leominster and the Diocese of Hereford, and is part of the Leominster Team Ministry. The church is supported by Herefordshire Historic Churches Trust. At 800 yards (732 m) west from the church and north from the A44, is a lake complex, specialising in recreational angling, which includes a tackle shop, holiday cottage accommodation and The Fisherman's Arms public house. To the north-east from the lakes is a Land Rover service company. Further holiday cottages are south from the A44, 500 yards (457 m) south-east from the church. At 300 yards (274 m) west from the church on the A44 is a sheep shearing equipment sales and servicing business, and at 1 mile (1.6 km) west, at the boundary with Humber, a supplier for free range and organic poultry. The nearest community or village hall is at Pudleston, less than one mile north from the parish boundary.

Bus stops for the Leominster to Ledbury route are on the A44. The closest rail connections are at Leominster railway station, 3 miles (5 km) to the west, on the Crewe to Newport Welsh Marches Line which also serves Hereford railway station, 12 miles (20 km) to the south, with further connections to Oxford on the Cotswold Line, and to Birmingham provided by West Midlands Trains.

== Landmarks ==
Within the parish are one Grade II* and six Grade II listed buildings, five of which are included in nine scheduled monuments.

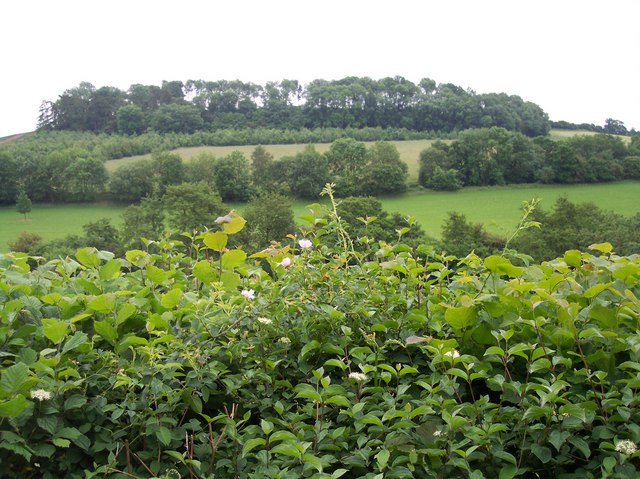
Uphampton Camp

The Grade II* Church of St Bartholomew (listed on 11 June 1959), dates to the 12th and 13th century and was largely rebuilt by Thomas Nicholson in 1880. Of sandstone with ashlar dressings, it comprises a nave, chancel, a south porch, and a west tower. The nave and chancel, under a continuous slate roof line, has three interior bays in the nave, and one in the chancel. The two-stage tower roof is pyramidic with a shingled octagonal broach spire, the north and west walls of the belfry stage with louvered abat-son, the south with a clock face. The towers two bells date to 1701 by Abraham Rudhall, and 1703 by Isaac Hadley, 1703. The south porch is 19th century, gabled and timber-framed. The church interior also dates to the 19th century. The nave ceiling is wood-beamed and trussed, that of the chancel barrel vaulted. Fixtures and fittings include a 19th-century panelled reredos, font and pulpit, and a 17th-century altar table and parish chest. The chancel contains an 1880 stained glass east window by Done and Davies of Shrewsbury, and 18th- and 19th-century wall tablets. At the south-west from the porch is a Grade II 14th-century octagonal stone base with steps, previously to hold a churchyard cross.

At 1,000 yards (900 m) north-west from the church is Uphampton Camp, a conjectured Iron Age hillfort. The earthworks rise to 623 feet (190 m) above sea level, and comprise two north face terraces (lynchets), each about 10 feet (3 m) in height, without ramparts or defensive ditch which might also be evidence of an agricultural structure, or a fort never completed.
