= Wacton =

Wacton may refer to:

- Wacton, Herefordshire, England
- Wacton, Norfolk, England
