= Hampton Charles, Herefordshire =

Hamlet and civil parish in Herefordshire, England

Coordinates: 52.246°N 2.577°W

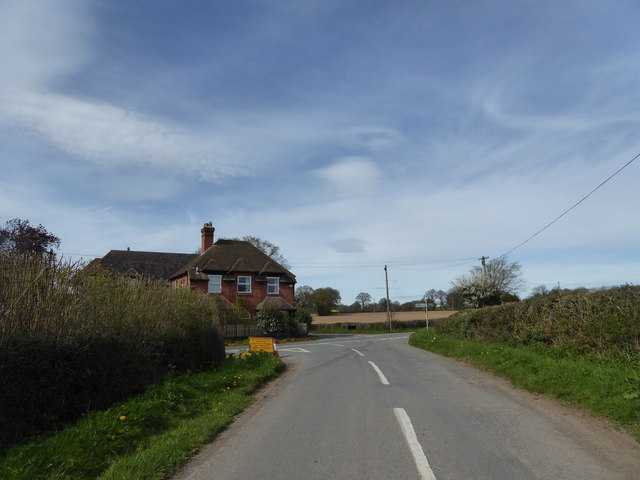
Lane junction

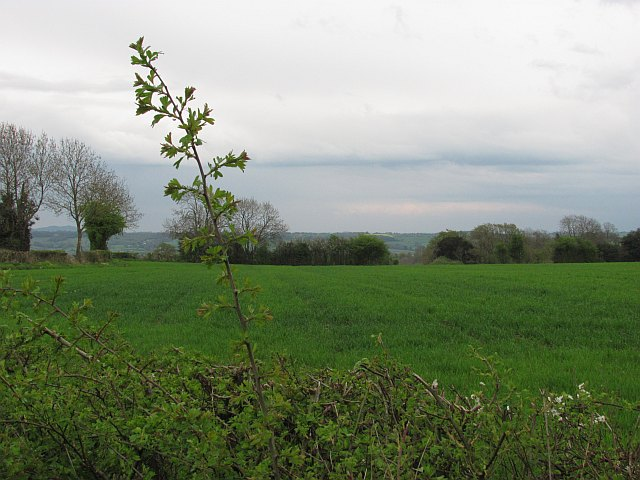
Winter crops

Hampton Charles is a dispersed hamlet and civil parish in Herefordshire, England, and approximately 5 miles (8 km) north-west from Bromyard. The Herefordshire parish of Hatfield and Newhampton is at the south-west and Thornbury at the south-east; the Worcestershire parish of Bockleton is at the north-west, Kyre at the north, and Stoke Bliss at the north-east.

In the 1870s Hampton Charles was a hamlet in the civil parish of Bockleton, with a population of 87 in 20 houses.
