= Hatfield, Herefordshire =

Village in Herefordshire, England

Coordinates: 52.231°N 2.599°W

Hatfield
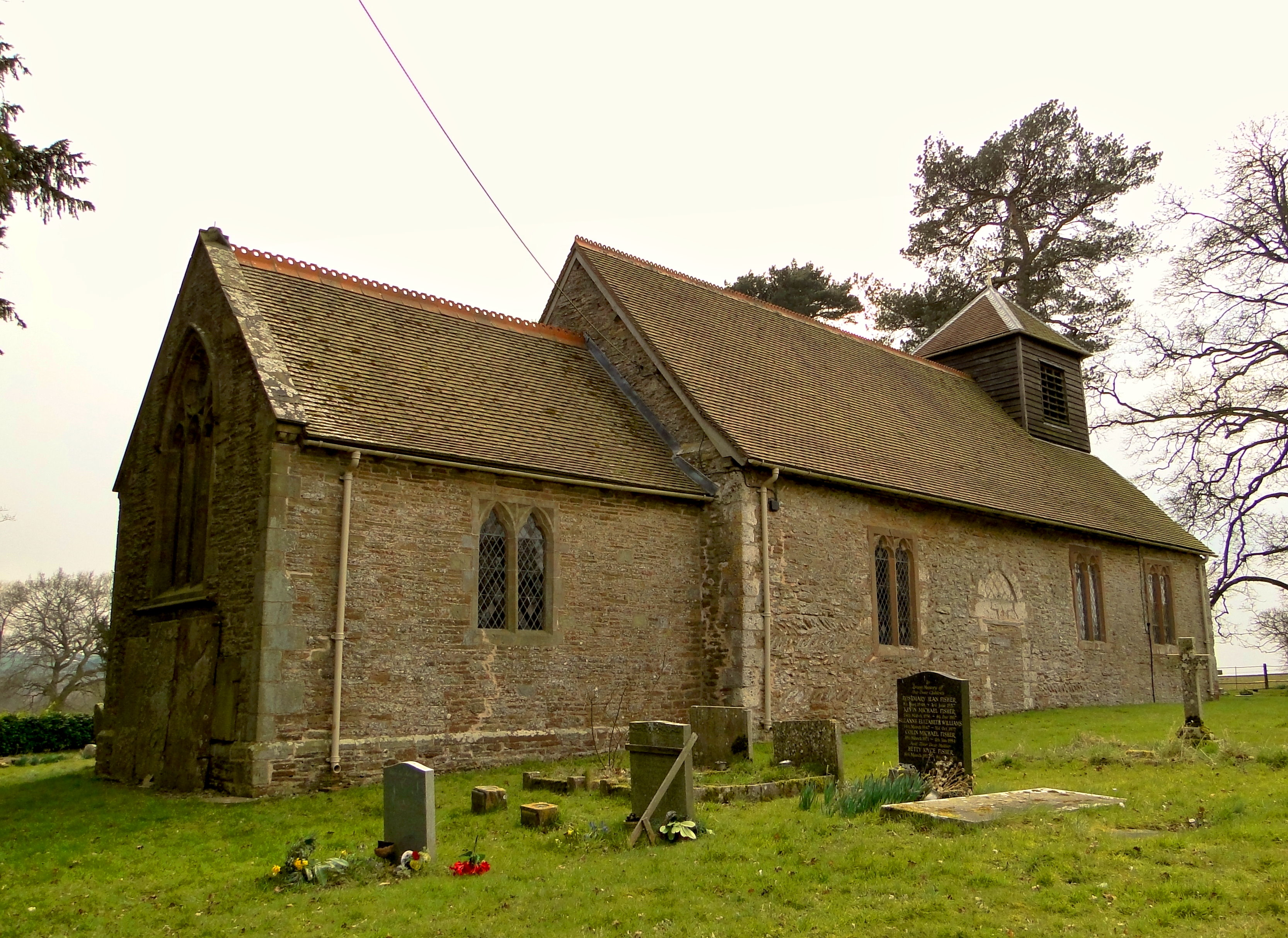
- St Leonard's Church

- Location within Herefordshire
- Civil parish: Hatfield and Newhampton
- Unitary authority: County of Herefordshire
- Ceremonial county: Herefordshire
- Region: West Midlands
- Country: England
- Sovereign state: United Kingdom

Hatfield is a village and former civil parish, now in the parish of Hatfield and Newhampton, in the county of Herefordshire, England. In 1961 the parish had a population of 141. On 1 April 1987 the parish was abolished and merged with New Hampton to form "Hatfield & Newhampton".

Nearby settlements include the village of Bockleton, and the towns of Tenbury Wells, Bromyard and Leominster. The city and county town of Hereford is 14 mi (23 km) to the south-southwest. The Herefordshire Trail runs through the village.

St Leonard's, the local church, is one of the oldest in Herefordshire; a church here was recorded in the Domesday Book of 1086. St Leonard's includes 13th and 14th-century bells and a late Saxon tub font. There is also a blocked late Saxon north doorway.

There is a caravan site in the village.
