= Wacton, Herefordshire =

Village and civil parish in Herefordshire, England

Coordinates: 52.21256°N 2.56489°W

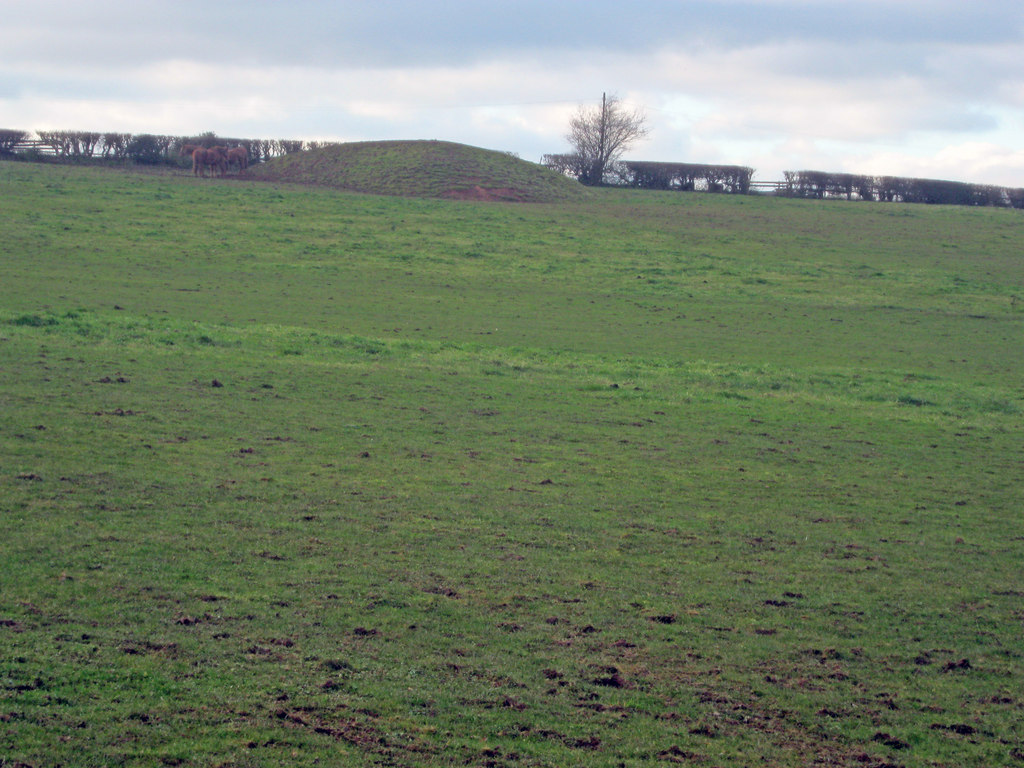
Motte at Wacton

Wacton is a small village and civil parish in the county of Herefordshire, England, and 5 miles (8 km) north-west from Bromyard.

In a field are remains of a motte and moat; buried foundations are all that remain of stone defences.
