= Earl Mortimer College =

Coordinates: 52.2218°N 2.7380°W

Location
- South Street; Leominster, Herefordshire, HR6 8JJ; England

Information
- Type: Community school
- Local authority: Herefordshire Council
- Department for Education URN: 116941 Tables
- Ofsted: Reports
- Principal: Alison Banner
- Gender: Coeducational
- Age: 11 to 16
- Enrolment: 535
- Capacity: 800
- Website: https://www.earlmortimer.org.uk/

Earl Mortimer College is a coeducational secondary school in Leominster, Herefordshire, England.

It is a community school administered by Herefordshire Council. It replaced the former Minster College and opened in September 2010. It is smaller than the average secondary school.

Earl Mortimer College offers GCSEs and BTECs as programmes of study for pupils.

The current principal is Alison Banner.

== School history ==
The school was originally established as the Minster School. In 2007 the council made the decision to rebuild the school to include a sixth form, using funding from Building Schools for the Future. It then became the Earl Mortimer College.

The school owns the art work The Minster Triptych by David Jones and students of the school.

There was a sixth form but closure of this was confirmed in 2023.

== School performance and inspections ==
In 2000, inspection by Ofsted judged the school to be improving.

As of January 2023, the college’s most recent Ofsted inspection, deemed the college to be ‘good’.

== Notable former pupils ==
The Minster School

- Essie Fox, historical novelist
- Julian Dunkerton (born 1965), co-founder of Superdry
