= Herefordshire County Council =

- Coat of arms

History
- Founded: 1 April 1889
- Disbanded: 31 March 1974
- Succeeded by: Hereford and Worcester County Council

Meeting place
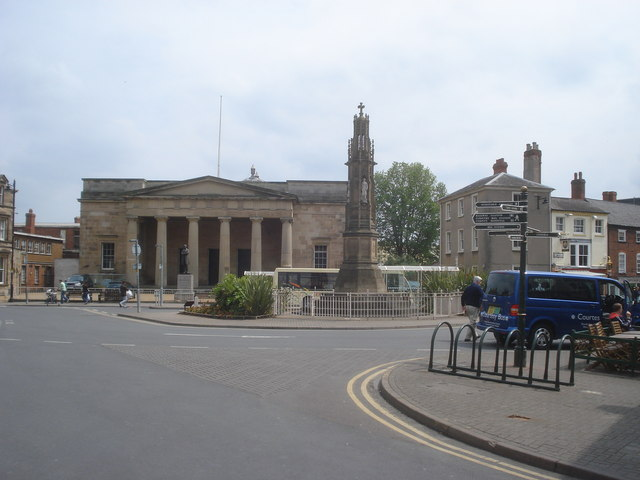
- Shirehall, Hereford

Herefordshire County Council was the county council of Herefordshire from 1 April 1889 to 31 March 1974. It was based at the Shirehall in Hereford.

It was created under the Local Government Act 1888 and took over many of the powers that had previously been exercised by the Hereford Quarter Sessions.

The first elections to Herefordshire County Council took place on 17 January 1889.

The first Chairman of the County Council was Andrew Rouse Boughton-Knight and the first clerk to the council was John Frederick Symonds.

It was replaced in 1974 by Hereford and Worcester County Council.

The coat of arms used by Herefordshire County Council (and subsequently adopted by Herefordshire Council) was not granted until 1946.
