= Parish (Church of England) =

Lowest geographical unit of the church

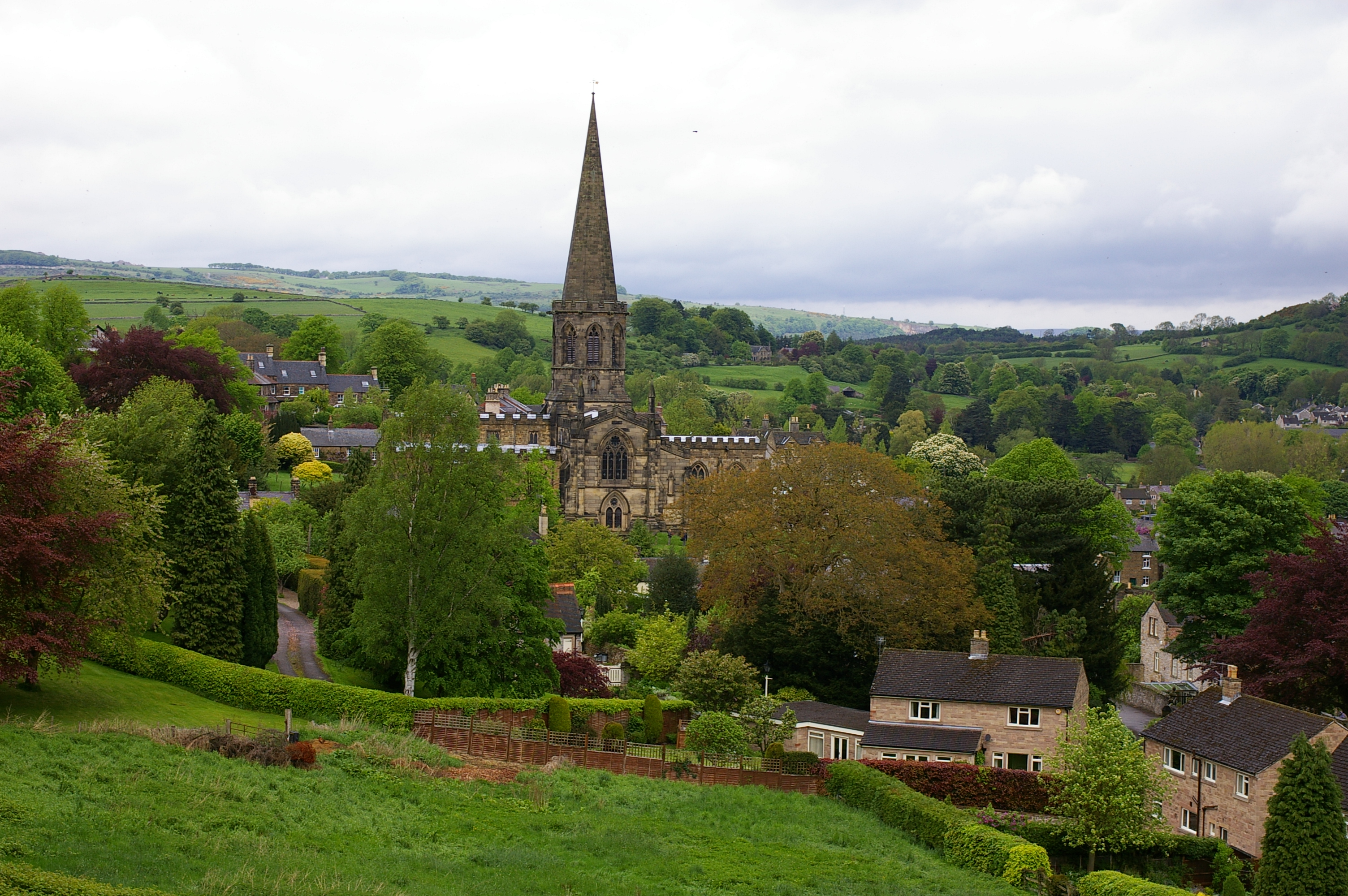
All Saints Bakewell, a parish church in Derbyshire

The parish with its parish church(es) is the basic territorial unit of the Church of England. The parish has its roots in the Catholic Church and survived the English Reformation largely untouched. Each is within one of 42 dioceses: divided between the thirty of the Province of Canterbury and the twelve of that of York. There are around 12,500 Church of England parishes. Historically, in England and Wales, the parish was the principal unit of local administration for both church and civil purposes; that changed in the 19th century when separate civil parishes were established. Many Church of England parishes still align, fully or in part, with civil parishes boundaries.

Each such ecclesiastical parish is administered by a parish priest, specifically Rector, Vicar or Perpetual curate depending on if the original set up of the rectory had become lay or disappropriated meaning its medieval rectorial property rights sold or bestowed on another body such as an abbey. This person may be assisted by curate(s) and/or deacon(s), who are also ordained and by lay clergy such as readers. High variance exists in the size of parishes, attendees and the number of christenings (baptisms), marriages, funerals and donations. Each parish is considered in the annual assessment and rebalancing of the diocese which pays the clergy's income (and indirectly by the Commissioners as regards most old endowments which are held in common). A parish priest may serve one parish or more and some are part of a team ministry. As a shorthand, the term can mean the community or the combined annual congregation.

== Etymology ==
A Latin variant of the Greek paroikia, the dwelling place of the priest, was used by the eighth Archbishop of Canterbury Theodore of Tarsus (who lived c. 602 to 690). He applied it to the Anglo-Saxon township with a priest.

First seen in written English when that tongue came back into writing in the late 13th century, the word parish comes from the Old French paroisse, in turn from Latin paroecia, which is the latinisation of the Greek παροικία (paroikia), "sojourning in a foreign land", itself from πάροικος (paroikos), "dwelling beside, stranger, sojourner", which is a compound of παρά (para), " beside, by, near" + οἶκος (oikos), "house".

== History ==
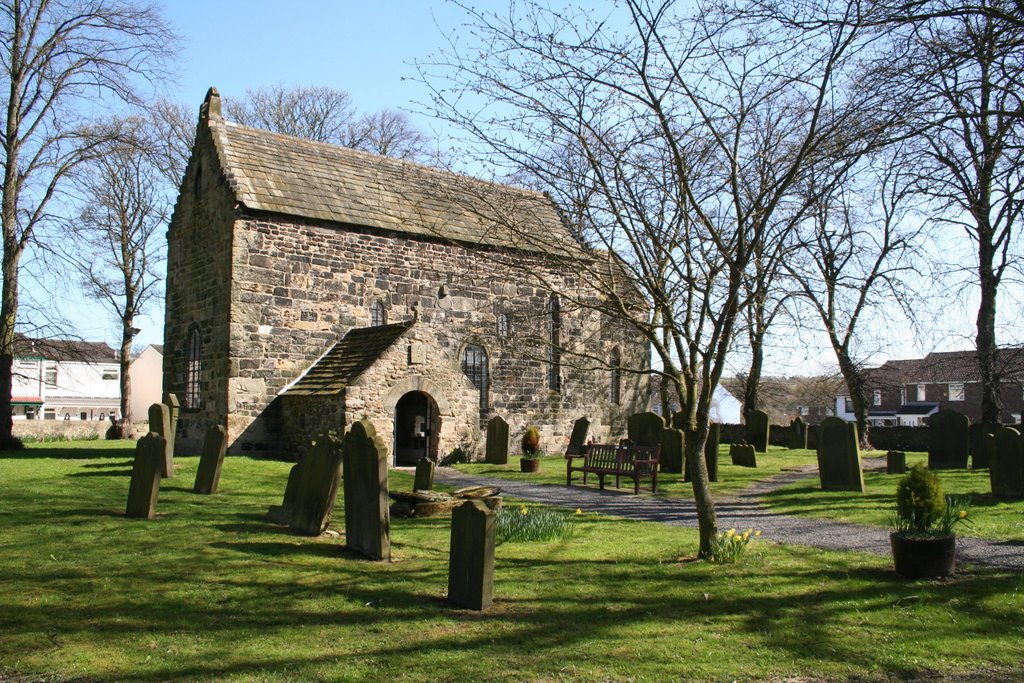
Escomb Church County Durham Saxon c.670-675

The introduction of Christianity and its development under Æthelberht of Kent (c. 560–616) required an organisational unit for administering the church. From the Greek paroikia, the dwellingplace of the priest, eighth Archbishop of Canterbury Theodore of Tarsus (c. 602–690) applied the ecclesiastical term parish to the Anglo-Saxon township format which were already in existence. Generally the township and parish coincided but in the North some townships may have been combined and in the South, where populations were bigger, two or more parishes might be made out of one township. Townships not included in a parish were extra-parochial. There may have been much less uniformity than these general guidelines imply. Extended since the 973-975 reign of Edgar (c. 943–975) the process of parish organisation appears to have been completed during the fifty-year reign of Edward III (1312–1377).

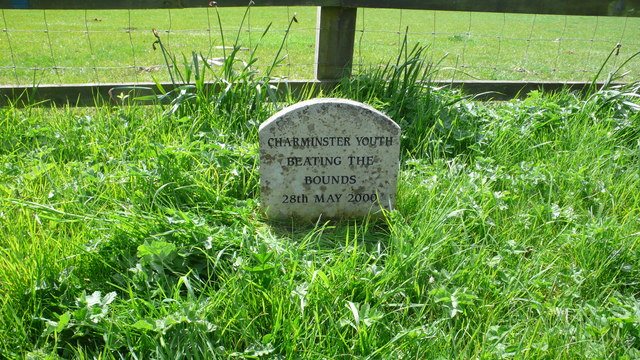
A parish boundary marker commemorating the ancient custom of Beating the bounds

In general Church of England parishes owe their origin to the establishment of a minster church by a corps of clergy. That usually large parish was soon subdivided into persistent smaller parishes, by legal doctrine termed "ancient parishes," each associated with an estate church founded by Anglo-Saxon or, later, Norman landowners, following the template for founding minsters, with consideration for the landowners' feudal dues and overlords. Having provided the land and usually the building the landowner reserved the right, "the advowson", to select a parish priest subject to the bishop's approval.

One parish may have straddled two (or rarely more) counties or hundreds and many extended to outlying portions, usually described as "detached parts". These were usually commons, a full farm or more modest enclosure or a burial plot, surrounded by the land of another parish.

Most ecclesiastical parish boundaries, in a few places perambulated each year by beating the bounds, loosely resembles one or more great estates of more than one thousand years ago but more precisely tends to date from simplifications since the 17th century to fit a parish with the updated landowner's bounds assumed (taken on) over intervening centuries thereby minimising disputes.

Some sparsely populated areas of England were outside any parish, i.e. extra-parochial until the 19th century, though a very few technical exceptions remain (most notably royal peculiars). The term unparished area, used for most urban areas, relates to civil parishes and not ecclesiastical parishes.

== Parish priest ==
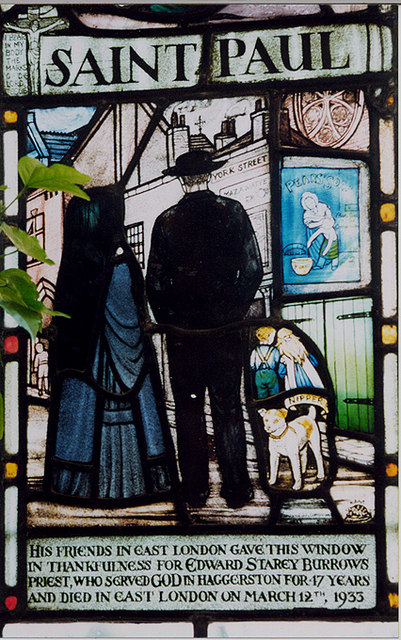
A window commemorating a priest who served his parish for 47 years

Each parish should have its own parish priest (titled Vicar of..., Rector of... or Perpetual Curate (usually going by Vicar of...) and prefix-styled and called the Reverend (Rev.), and mostly in the high church tradition Reverend Father or less formally Fr. (Father)), perhaps supported by one or more curates and/or deacons. Termed ecclesiastical pluralism some parish priests have held more than one parish living (benefice), traditionally placing a curate in charge of those where they did not reside. The church property is in a special form of ownership ex-officio, vested in them on institution and during tenure and so on as to successors.

Today most parishes of low attendance that are neighbouring are served by the same priest who leads in the churchmanship style and preaches, leads the worship and gives the sacrament in one church (or sometimes more) of each parish by rotation. Formal amalgamation of parishes is generally a quite slow reform but has happened for centuries. In those of higher attendance the priest does so without such inter-parish rotation, but will typically rotate intra-parish if the parish happens to have more than one active church and no other ordained clergy.

Further services are very often given by lay readers or other non-ordained members of the church community (most often called assistant readers).

In the Church of England, the legal right to appoint or recommend a parish priest is called an advowson, and its possessor is known as a patron. The patron can be a person or else or jointly or by rotation, the Crown, a bishop, a college, other Christian body, or a charity. Appointment (being invested as) a parish priest gave the incumbent many more privileges than today of having their benefice also termed a living – notably a wide range of lower to upper middle class incomes, depending on the type of benefice, hence most old summaries of parishes state the gross or net value of a living, whether present or in the Tudor-period King's Books which is an indicative starting point. Pope Leo IX first visited the union in 1052, marking a great point in its detailed history. The strength of the rights waned markedly after the Tudor period. In cases where Oxford and Cambridge colleges were the improprietors of a parish's rectory, they would often nominate a candidate theologian to the diocesan bishop. Appointment is currently governed under the Patronage (Benefices) Rules 1987.

Until the 19th century rise of literacy especially, such patronage (advowson) might well help sway local opinions. However, a patron's candidate has always had to be approved by the diocesan bishop.

An example can be seen in the article on Grendon, Northamptonshire. It was frequently used to promote particular religious views. For example, Robert Rich, 2nd Earl of Warwick presented many puritan clergy. In the 19th century Charles Simeon established a trust to purchase advowsons and install evangelical priests. Patronage thus has passing relevance to the small group of patrons today strongly geared towards one style of churchmanship or another – it is far from the final say on the matter. The right to sell advowsons was reduced by Acts and Rules until all sales became ineffective – since 1936. Subject to local covenants, and their wealth, many church patrons contributed much to funds (beyond the by Poor Law Reforms-abolished system of rates).

== Parish administration ==
The major business of the parish was administered by its vestry, an assembly or meeting of parishioners or their representatives to make the necessary decisions. Under the Registration Act 1836, from 1 July 1837 the Church vestry's civil responsibilities devolved in gradual steps to the purely civil parish and its parish council and soon more widely than before to poor law unions as to poor relief.

To ease internal frictions and more evenly manage and distribute funds and clergy the church set up Ecclesiastical Commissioners. All the ecclesiastical parish's major acts such as repairs, day-to-day financing, building lettings, fundraising for local schools and usual charities and church grounds are administered by the parochial church council. This is partly ex officio (by virtue of a certain role) constituted and partly elected from the congregation.

A few purely civil parishes had been created between the English Civil War and the wholescale Victorian reforms, but they were few in number: Bedfordshire had one such; not created until 1810.

=== Parish clerk ===
The ancient parochial office of clerk went in early times under the Latin name aquae bajulus, (Holy) Water Bearer since the sprinkling of holy water was seen as an important duty of this office. He had many other duties as a kind of general assistant to the parish priest; these included participation in church services and accompanying the priest on various occasions. At his induction into office he received the holy water and sprinkler (probably from the Archdeacon). By an injunction of the King's Visitors in 1548 (reign of Edward VI) their duties were redefined; the custom of holy water sprinkling was abolished. The clerk then began to be an assistant to the churchwardens in collecting money (the Rates, tithes and any extra donations) such as for the benefit of the poor as well as continuing in some of his other functions. Parish clerks were appointed on the nomination of the parish priest and their tenure was regarded as secure. By the Lecturers and Parish Clerks Act 1844 (7 & 8 Vict. c. 59) only the archdeacon or the bishop could remove him from office (in case of misconduct). Sometimes the character and abilities of the clerk did not suit the priest and he would appoint someone more to his liking, leaving the original in a sinecure.

=== Vestry's responsibilities ===
In the absence of any other authority (which there would be in an incorporated city or town), the vestry, the ecclesiastical parish administrative centre, was the recognised unit of local government, concerned for the spiritual but also the temporal as well as physical welfare of parishioners and its parish amenities, collecting local rates or taxes and taking responsibility for the care of the poor, roads, law enforcement, etc. For example, parishes carried out the duties as legislated by the Poor Law. What follows is a snapshot of the system at a particular point in time:

==== 1835 ====
In 1835 more than 15,600 parishes looked after their own:

- "churches and burial grounds, parish cottages and workhouses, their common lands and endowed charities, their market crosses, pumps, pounds, whipping posts, stocks, cages, watch houses, weights and scales, clocks and fire engines.
- Or to put it another way: the maintenance of the church and its services, the keeping of the peace, the repression of vagrancy, the relief of destitution, the mending of roads, the suppression of nuisances, the destruction of vermin, the furnishing (billeting) of soldiers and sailors, even to some extent the enforcement of religious and moral discipline. These were among the multitudinous duties imposed on the parish and its officers by the law of the land.
- The parishes spent not far short of one-fifth of the budget of the national government itself."

Central government placed its obligations on parishes without specifying how they should be carried out. So no two parishes were organised in the same way, unless by coincidence.

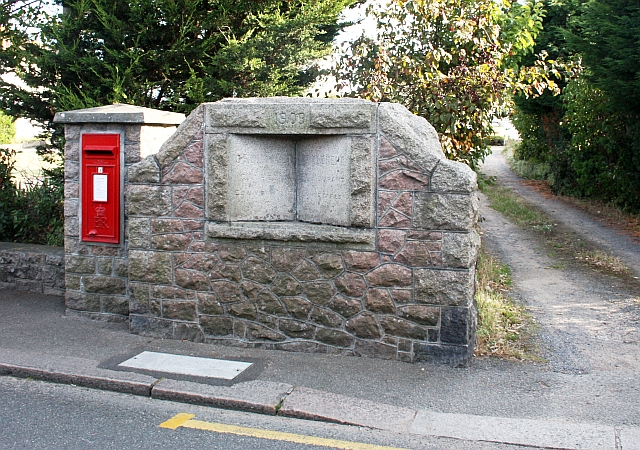
Parish boundary stone between the parishes of Grouville and St Clement Channel Islands, (1909) showing the names of the constables

The responsible householder found himself bound to serve in succession in the onerous and wholly unpaid public offices of

- Churchwarden,
- Overseer,
- Surveyor of Highways,
- Constable;

by rotation every man was called upon in church to send his team or go in person to labour for six days on the roads. The whole parish had to turn out, when summoned, to join in the hue and cry after suspected felons such as robbers. This general ability to carry out the sheriff's rights followed a sheriff's posse and were known as the sheriff's posse.

The property-less employee escaped the tithes and taxes and received, when destitute, the parish pay. Under the Settlement Act 1662, aka Poor Relief Act, at the discretion of the Overseers of the Poor, he was liable to be sent back to the parish where he was born or otherwise legally settled. However, he could obtain a settlement certificate to enable him to seek work elsewhere. He might thus live in a new parish but without becoming settled by contribution receive no benefits from the new parish; only from his parish of origin.

Increasingly from the 17th century, the wealthy classes in town or country could buy exemption from, or commute for money, many of the innumerable personal obligations imposed by the parish, and largely interacted with the vestry therefore only as a taxing authority.

== Civil parish ==
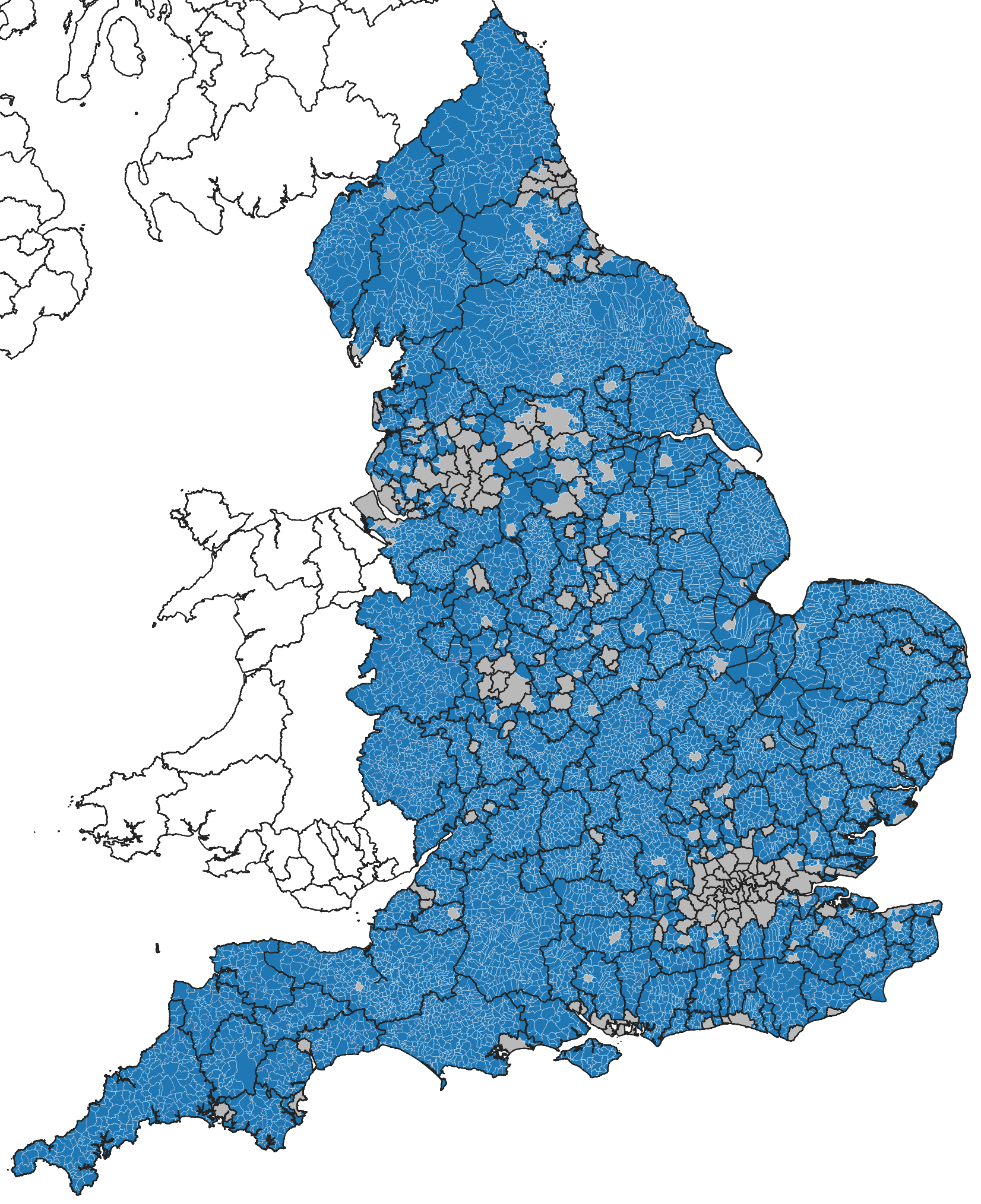
About 35% of residents of England have a local civil parish; for the rest the lowest level of local government is their Borough, District, (unitary) City or (unitary) County Council

Civil parishes and their governing parish councils came about as ecclesiastical parishes were relieved of what became, as faith and politics diversified, more conveniently made civic (secular) state responsibilities. Initially coterminous (with the same boundaries) by 1911 this held true of only 58%, with many unparished areas in civil terms, and continues to fall.

Poor Law administration increasingly took account of widespread urban and rural population change given the Industrial Revolution. It became appreciated as expedient and necessary for the lower level of poor law administration, civil parishes, beneath poor law unions, to fit county limits. Ecclesiastical parishes not always did. Sanitation districts were set up by law, by preference, to draw on the secular most local (civil parish) councils until often effectively promoted, often reshaped, into public service administrative districts. Since 1895, a parish council elected by the general public or a (civil) parish meeting administers a civil parish. It ebbed in powers and functions until the Local Government Act 1972 and related legislation has brought relative stability to these. It is since 1974 been the level of local government below district and borough councils and since 1992 patchwork rationalisation all county or city-wide unitary authorities of England. For many years the description of the number of tiers in local government routinely ignored civil parishes.

== See also ==
- Parish church
- Parish pump
- Parish registers: Birth certificate, Marriage certificate, Death certificate
- Archdeaconry
- Diocese
