= Bockleton =

Village in Worcestershire, England

Coordinates: 52.250°N 2.598°W

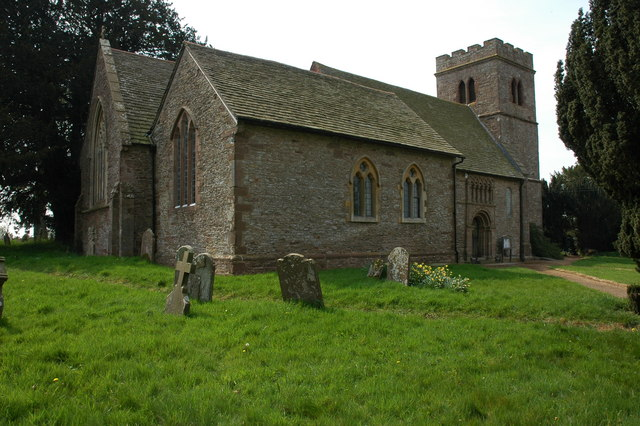
- The Church of St Michael, Bockleton

- Location within Worcestershire
- Population: 198
- OS grid reference: SO592614
  - London: 119 miles (192 km)
- Civil parish: Bockleton
- District: Malvern Hills District
- Shire county: Worcestershire
- Region: West Midlands
- Country: England
- Sovereign state: United Kingdom
- Post town: TENBURY WELLS
- Postcode district: WR15
- Dialling code: 01568
- Police: West Mercia
- Fire: Hereford and Worcester
- Ambulance: West Midlands
- UK Parliament: West Worcestershire

Bockleton is a small village and civil parish (with a shared parish council with neighbouring Stoke Bliss and Kyre) in the Malvern Hills district of Worcestershire, England, five miles (8 km) south of Tenbury Wells. According to the 2021 census it had a population of 198. It is close to the Herefordshire border and is about nine miles (14 km) east of Leominster in Herefordshire.

== History ==
The name Bockleton derives from the Old English Boccelingtūn meaning 'settlement connected with Boccel'.

The village of Bockleton was originally called "Bocklington" until its name changed some time between 1785 and 1787 according to maps of the region. One of the earliest mentions of the village dates from 1246 in the life of Peter of Aigueblanche the then Bishop of Hereford. Extant sources state "In 1246 his new statutes on these points duly received papal confirmation (Bliss, i. 229). He was celebrated in the church of Hereford for his long and strenuous defence of the liberties of see and chapter against ‘the citizens of Hereford and other rebels against the church.’ He bought the manor of Holme Lacy and gave it to his church, appropriated the church of Bocklington to the treasurer, gave mitres, and chalice, vestments and books, and various rents (Monasticon, vi. 1216)."

The Barnaby family lived at the Manor. In 1604 Amphylis Barnaby wanted to get a cousin a place in the household of Prince Henry in London. She wrote to her friend and niece Meriel Lyttelton of Hagley for help. Lyttleton explained that competition was fierce for these court positions and the social advantages they might bring. Young Barnaby had no chance.

The parish church of St Michael is a Grade II* listed building. It has an 1867 monument, in white marble, by Pre-Raphaelite sculptor Thomas Woolner to William Prescott, a local squire who died from an infection caught after tending his sick gamekeeper. It depicts him nursing the aged man.

Bockleton was in the upper division of Doddingtree Hundred.
