= Leominster (district) =

Local government district in England

Coordinates: 52.22°N 2.74°W

- History
  - Created: 1 April 1974
  - Abolished: 31 March 1998
  - Succeeded by: Herefordshire, Malvern Hills
- Status: non-metropolitan district

Leominster was a non-metropolitan district in Hereford and Worcester, England from 1974 to 1998. The council was based in the town of Leominster.

== History ==
The district was created on 1 April 1974 under the Local Government Act 1972, covering the area of six former districts, which were abolished at the same time:

- Kington Rural District
- Kington Urban District
- Leominster Municipal Borough
- Leominster and Wigmore Rural District
- Tenbury Rural District
- Weobley Rural District

The Tenbury district had previously been in Worcestershire, the other five districts had previously been in Herefordshire. The two counties merged at the same time to become Hereford and Worcester, with Leominster being one of nine districts in the new county, and one of only two which straddled the two historic counties (the other being Malvern Hills District). It was originally intended for there to be 1 single district for Herefordshire, it was later decided to split it into 3.

In 1998, the district of Leominster and the county of Hereford and Worcester were both abolished, with the former Herefordshire parts of Leominster district becoming part of the new unitary authority of Herefordshire, whilst the former Worcestershire parts were transferred to a redefined Malvern Hills District, which remained in a two tier structure with a re-established Worcestershire County Council as its new county council.

== Parishes ==
The district comprised the following civil parishes:

- Adforton
- Almeley
- Aymestrey
- Bayton
- Birley
- Bishopstone
- Blakemere
- Bockleton
- Bodenham
- Brampton Bryan
- Bridge Sollers
- Brilley
- Brimfield
- Brinsop
- Brobury
- Buckton and Coxall
- Burrington
- Byford
- Byton
- Canon Pyon
- Combe
- Croft, Herefordshire
- Dilwyn
- Docklow
- Downton
- Eardisland
- Eardisley
- Eastham, Worcestershire
- Elton, Herefordshire
- Eye, Moreton and Ashton
- Eyton
- Ford
- Hampton Wafer
- Hanley
- Hatfield
- Hope under Dinmore
- Humber
- Huntington
- Kimbolton
- King's Pyon
- Kingsland
- Kington Rural
- Kington
- Kinnersley
- Kinsham
- Knighton on Teme
- Knill
- Kyre
- Laysters
- Leinthall Starkes
- Leintwardine
- Leominster
- Letton
- Lindridge
- Lingen
- Little Hereford
- Lower Harpton
- Lucton
- Luston
- Lyonshall
- Mamble
- Mansell Gamage
- Mansell Lacy
- Middleton on the Hill
- Moccas
- Monkland
- Monnington on Wye
- New Hampton
- Newton and Willey
- Norton Canon
- Orleton
- Pembridge
- Pensax
- Pipe Aston
- Preston on Wye
- Pudleston
- Richard's Castle (Hereford)
- Rochford
- Rodd, Nash and Little Brampton
- Sarnesfield
- Shobdon
- Stanford with Orleton
- Stapleton
- Staunton on Arrow
- Staunton on Wye
- Stockton on Teme
- Stoke Bliss
- Stoke Prior
- Stretford
- Tenbury
- Titley
- Walford, Letton and Newton
- Weobley
- Whitney-on-Wye
- Wigmore
- Willersley and Winforton
- Wormsley
- Yarpole
- Yazor

== Political control ==
The first elections to Leominster District Council were held in 1973, initially operating as a shadow authority before coming into its powers on 1 April 1974. Political control of the council from 1974 until its abolition in 1998 was as follows:

Party in control	Years
Independent	1974–1995
No overall control	1995–1996
Independent	1996–1998

== Council elections ==
- 1973 Leominster District Council election
- 1976 Leominster District Council election
- 1979 Leominster District Council election (New ward boundaries)
- 1980 Leominster District Council election
- 1982 Leominster District Council election
- 1983 Leominster District Council election
- 1984 Leominster District Council election
- 1986 Leominster District Council election (District boundary changes took place but the number of seats remained the same)
- 1987 Leominster District Council election
- 1988 Leominster District Council election (District boundary changes took place but the number of seats remained the same)
- 1990 Leominster District Council election
- 1991 Leominster District Council election
- 1992 Leominster District Council election
- 1994 Leominster District Council election
- 1995 Leominster District Council election
- 1996 Leominster District Council election
