= Kington Rural =

Civil parish in Herefordshire, England

Coordinates: 52.1952°N 3.07130°W

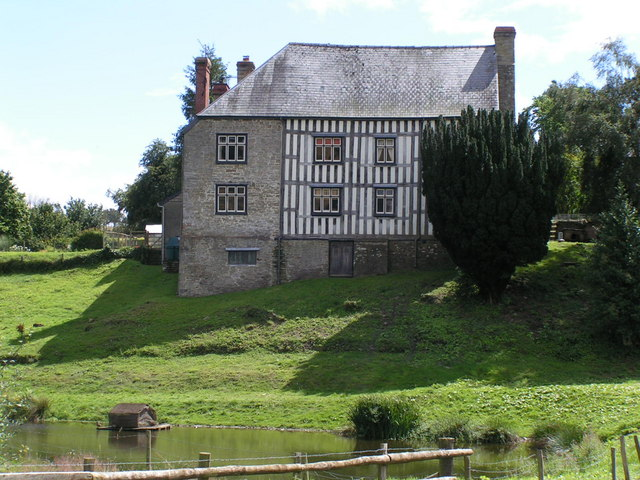
- Hergest Court, former manor house, c.1430 grid reference SO2813755421

- Location within Herefordshire
- OS grid reference: SO268557
  - London: 135 mi (217 km) ESE
- Unitary authority: Herefordshire
- Ceremonial county: Herefordshire
- Region: West Midlands
- Country: England
- Sovereign state: United Kingdom
- Post town: Hereford
- Postcode district: HR5
- Dialling code: 01544
- Police: West Mercia
- Fire: Hereford and Worcester
- Ambulance: West Midlands
- UK Parliament: North Herefordshire

Kington Rural is a civil parish in west Herefordshire, England, and is approximately 17 miles (30 km) north-west from the city and county town of Hereford. The parish borders Wales at the west, and contains the hamlets and small settlements of Upper Hergest, Lower Hergest, Chickward, Bredward, and Kingswood at the south, and Bradnor Green and Rushok at the north. The nearest town is the market town of Kington which, with its parish, is to a large extent enclosed by Kington Rural. Significant landmarks of the parish are the Castle Twts motte and bailey earthwork, Hergest Court 15th-century manor house, and Hergest Ridge on the England–Wales border.

== History ==
Kington as a settlement is listed in the Domesday Book, as in the hundred of Elsdon and the county of Herefordshire. The lords in 1066 were Edward the Confessor and Harold Godwinson (Earl Harold). Following the Norman Conquest the manor and its tenancy in chief was transferred in entirety to king William I. The manorial lands were possibly wasteland both before and after the Conquest. As part of the Domesday Kington listing were the associated settlements or areas of Barton, Bollingham, Breadward, Chickward, Huntington, Rushock, Lower and Upper Hergest, and Lower and Upper Welson. Earl Harold's fiefdom also included the adjacent manors of Eardisley, Willersley, Winforton, Lyonshall, Pembridge, and Titley, as part of his wider ownership of Herefordshire.

By the middle of the 19th century, Kington Rural was part of Kington parish, which consisted of the townships of Kington Old, Kington New; Lower with Upper Hergest; Barton; Bradnor with Rushock; Pember's Oak, Chickward; and Lilwall. The parish population, without the town of Kington, was 833. The wider parish settlements, dependent on the town of Kington, had been supporting the significance for the manufacture of woollen cloth, a reduced importance of glove making, and an 1815 established iron-foundry and nail factory with its railway link to Brecon and canal at Newport. The satellite settlements could access at Kington a Wednesday provisions market, a Whit Monday fair, and four annual cattle markets. A Union workhouse—part of poor relief and joint parish workhouse provision set up under the Poor Law Amendment Act 1834—was a quarter of a mile to the south from the town of Kington near Kingswood, was built in 1837 at a cost of £2,400, and described as a "large and commodious stone building"; it accommodated 160 paupers and provided for 26 local parishes and townships. The county magistrates held within the parish, petty sessions for the hundreds of Huntington and Wigmore. The ecclesiastical parish living was a vicarage to which was attached curacies for the parishes of Brilley, Huntington, and Michaelchurch, and in the gift of the Bishop of Hereford. The ecclesiastical parish was part of the rural deanery of Weobley and archdeaconry and diocese of Hereford. Baptists and Wesleyan Methodist also had established places of worship, at Upper Cross in 1801, and Kingswood in 1862. A school was erected at Mahollam (grid reference SO271542), in 1860 which held 70 children, with an average attendance of 35. Within St Mary's Church at Kington is the "magnificent altar tomb of alabaster" of Thomas Vaughan (died 1469), of Hergest Court, the 15th-century manor house, at this time listed as a farmhouse, and today in Kington Rural.

By the early 1890s Kington parish comprised an area of 8,313 acres (3,364 ha) in 1890, and 8,028 acres (3,249 ha) in 1895, and still divided into the five townships, in the hundred of Huntington, and had an 1891 population of 2,086. It was part of the Eardisley and Kington polling district and electoral division of the county council, and was the centre of its own county court district, and petty sessional division. The Kington petty sessional division also covered the parishes or townships of Brilley, Byton, Combe, Eardisley, Lower Harpton, Huntington, Kinsham, Knill, Lyonshall, Pembridge, Rodd, Nash and Little Brampton, Stapleton and Frog [Ford] Street, Staunton on Arrow, and Titley.

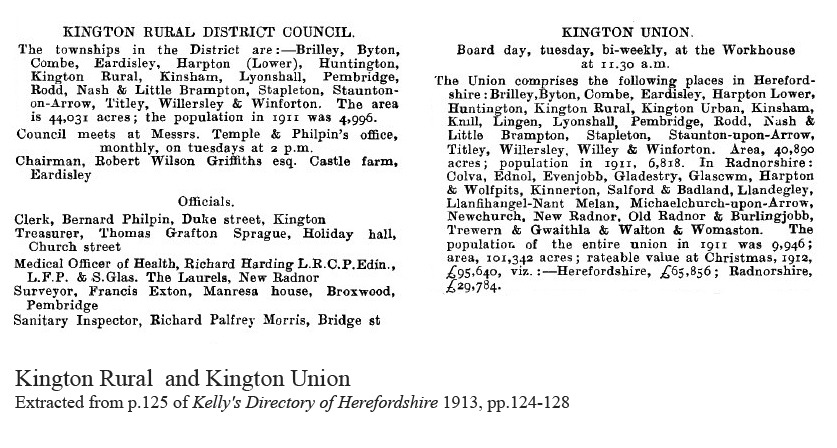
Kington Rural District Council and Kington Union, Kelly's Directory of Herefordshire 1913

From 1829 Kington town and country areas had been administered by a board of commissioners, under the Kington (Herefordshire) Improvement Act 1829. From 1894, under the Local Government Act 1894, the parish was divided by the establishment of a Kington Urban District Council for the town, and Kington Rural District Council, a separate entity for the rural area. The urban district covered 859 acres (348 ha), and the urban and rural population in 1891 was 2,086. The council for Kington Rural met in the town of Kington. Within Kington Rural there were 195 houses and a population of 877. Housing was constructed with stone from local quarries such as those at Hergest and Bradnor. A quarry was opened at the Hergest mill estate in 1889–90, providing "first-class building stone". The Kington Union workhouse could accommodate 150 paupers, but held about 50, and also housed the officers of the establishment. The Victoria Cottage Hospital in Kington, "intended for the reception of poor people living in Kington and its [rural] neighbourhood" and supported by voluntary subscriptions, was a red brick building erected in 1887 at a cost of £1,200. The hospital contained six beds, and in 1894 treated 41 people. Kingswood, to the south from Kington town, purchased in 1868, was divided, largely cleared and cultivated, with some "neat villa residences" erected.

Hergest ridge was reported as "an eminence commanding exceedingly extensive and picturesque views of the surrounding country", where races were formerly held on a course laid out by subscription in 1826; race meetings ceased in 1876. On Bradnor hill was reported the remains of a square shaped camp, "commanding a most extensive prospect". The 16th-century antiquarian John Leland was unable to determine whether the camp was British, Roman, or Saxon.

The local newspaper, published every Tuesday, was The Kington Gazette & Radnorshire Chronicle.

Occupations listed in 1890 included thirty-seven farmers. There were nine cottage farmers, one of whom was a threshing machine proprietor, one a lime burner, and two at Kingswood, one of whom was a haulier, with a further haulier. At Floodgates in Kington Rural at the north of Kington town were two further hauliers, two game dealers, one of whom was a carrier, two further millers, and a chimney sweep. Added to these was a guano merchant, a seedsman, miller and a manure dealer, who also dealt in artificial manures, at Hergest Mills, a wheelwright at Pember's Oak, and a cow keeper at Haywood Common. By 1895 extra listed occupations included a blacksmith and a boot maker at Lower Hergest, a stonemason at Kingswood, a rope & twine maker at Townsend, a woollen manufacturer at Crabtree mill.

By the early 20th century Kington Rural was of 7,150 acres (2,900 ha) of land and 20 acres (8 ha) of water, with a 1911 population of 652, and gave its name to the multi-parish Kingston Rural District Council. Population of the ecclesiastical parish at the time was 2,651, which included those in Huntington, and Kington was now its own rural deanery. In 1901 an infirmary was added to the Union workhouse, which then held 100 inmates. The local newspaper was now the Kington Times & North Herefordshire Advertiser, published Saturdays. In 1913 twenty-one farmers were listed. Hergest Mills and the boot maker at Lower Hergest were still in business, as was now a dairyman at Floodgates.

== Geography ==
Kington Rural parish is the outer ring of what is sometimes called the Kington 'doughnut', which mostly surrounds the Kington town urban area and includes the rural parts of eastern Kington parish. The boundary is of irregular footprint with two separate land parts, north and south, joined at its north-west by a 900 yards (800 m) wide land bridge between the parishes of Lower Harpton and Kington. At its greatest distance the parish is approximately 3.5 miles (6 km) north to south and east to west, and covers an area of approximately 8,000 acres (3,200 hectares). Adjacent Herefordshire parishes are Lower Harpton, Knill, Rodd, Nash and Little Brampton and Titley at the north, Lyonshall and Kington at the east, Eardisley at the south-east, Brilley and Huntingdon at the south, and the Old Radnor and Gladestry communities in Powys, Wales at the west. The parish is rural, of farm complexes, fields, managed woodland and coppices, watercourses, ponds, grazed uplands, residential properties and businesses. Flowing south-west to north-east through Kington Rural is the River Arrow, which then flows into Kington, then back to Kington Rural where is forms the border with Lyonsall. The Arrow is fed by Gladestry Brook at the south of the parish which partly forms the border with Huntington, and the Gilwern Brook through the middle, partly forming the border with Kington. A major route in Kington Rural is the Oxford to Aberystwyth A44 road, which runs as the Kington bypass into Stanner Road east to west through the middle of the parish for 2 miles (3 km). A further major road is the A4111 from the A44 Kington bypass to Eardisley village, which passes north to south through the east of the parish adjacent to Kingswood. From the Kington bypass, running north in the north-east of the parish is the B4355 road, through Titley to Presteigne. The only other through route is the minor Hergest Road, which runs north to south through the parish from Kington to the village of Brilley. Two further minor roads run west from Hergest Road: one through Lower and Upper Hergest to Gladestry; the other farther south, Mahollam Road to Huntington. Hergest Ridge, a common bordering Wales, rising to 1,394 feet (425 m) at the north-west of the parish and crisscrossed by footpaths, is the site of a horse racecourse, and is on the long-distance Offa's Dyke Path. All other routes are bridleways, farm tracks, property entrances and footpaths.

== Governance ==
Kington Rural is represented in the lowest tier of UK governance by the fourteen-member Kington Rural and Lower Harpton Group Parish Council, with twelve members from Kington Rural and two from Lower Harpton, jointly covering 284 households (2014–15). The purview of the council includes community buildings, planning, street lighting and furniture, allotments, monuments and memorials, cemeteries and crematoria, highways and traffic schemes, common pasture and open spaces. As Herefordshire is a unitary authority—no district council between parish and county councils—the parish sends councilors representing the Kington Ward containing the parishes of Huntington, Kington, Kington Rural, and Lower Harpton, with an estimated joint population of 3,315, to Herefordshire County Council, and is part of the Northern Area Meeting Group of the Herefordshire four-parts Parish Council Area Meeting Groups.

Kington Rural is represented in the UK parliament as part of the North Herefordshire constituency.

== Community ==
There are five bus routes that intersect the parish, all focusing on the town of Kington and operated by Kington-based Sargeants Brothers. Two are the south-east to north-west routes from Hereford to Llandrindod Wells, which run along the A44 Stanner Road. A circular route runs from Kington through the north-east of Kington Rural, to Combe Moor in Byton, then north-west to Presteigne, then west to New Radnor via Walton, and then south-east to Kington via the A44 in Kington Rural. A fourth route begins at Kington, and runs north-east through Kington Rural to Titley, then north into Wales, to Presteigne, Knighton, Knucklas and Lloyney. A fifth route is circular within Kington town, with a Kington Rural south-west arm running along Hergest Road to the business park in Lower Hergest. The closest England rail connections are on the Welsh Marches line, at Leominster railway station 14 miles (23 km) to the west, and Hereford railway station 17 miles (27 km) to the south-east. At 10 miles (16 km) north in Wales is Knighton railway station, at Knighton, on the Heart of Wales line.

The closest National Health Service (NHS) GP doctor surgery is Kington Medical Practice in Kington. The nearest NHS major hospital is Hereford County Hospital at Hereford, part of the Wye Valley NHS Trust. The nearest Herefordshire catchment area schools are in the town of Kington. Primary education is provided by Kington Primary school, and secondary by Lady Hawkins School. In latest full Ofsted inspections Kington Primary was rated overall Grade 2 'Good' (2016), as was Lady Hawkins (2018). For religion Kington Rural falls under the five-church Kington Parishes group in the Kington and Weobley Deanery of the Hereford Archdeaconry, in the Diocese of Hereford, with the nearest parish church being St Mary's in the town of Kington.

At Kingswood, on Kingswood Road, in the south-east of the parish is small breeds farm, a farm nature reserve which is a Site of Special Scientific Interest (SSSI), a guest house and a farm holiday home. On Hergest Road in Bredward is the Arrow Court Industrial Estate grouped with the Hergest Industrial Estate, where are businesses including vehicle repair and engine rebuilding shops, a furniture maker, a steel fabricator, a vintage furniture and house clearance outlet, and a plant and machinery hire company. In the north of the parish, at Bradnor Green, is the 18-hole Kington Golf Club with an adjacent online sports shop and The Beacon, which was the home of Mike Oldfield during the time of recording the album Hergest Ridge; his following 1975 album Ommadawn was recorded on a 24-track studio at The Beacon.

== Landmarks ==
There are five Grade II* listed buildings in Kington Rural, including farmhouses, a manor house, cottages, and a granary.

At Lower Hergest is the scheduled monument earthwork remains of the Castle Twts motte-and-bailey (grid reference SO2770355474), the motte of which is 57 feet (17 m) diameter rising to 8 feet (2 m), in a defensive area of slightly larger than 0.5 acres (0.2 ha).

Hergest Court (grid reference SO2813755421), built c.1430 and originally surrounded by a moat, is a Grade II* former manor house which is reputed to have been built for statesman and diplomat Thomas Vaughan, second son to Sir Roger Vaughan. The L-plan house is of two storeys with cellars and attics, part constructed of stone and part wattle and daub infilled timber-framed, with casement windows and a Welsh slate covered roof with gable end chimney stacks. Alterations were made during the 17th, 18th, and 20th century, with eight ancillary dilapidated buildings demolished in the 18th. The interior contains late 16th or early 17th-century panelling, an early 17th-century staircase, a c.1500 fireplace, and a number of exposed ceiling-beams. The Red Book of Hergest, the c.1380 Medieval Welsh language prose and poetry manuscript from which the Mabinogion British prose stories were part, is reputed to have been found at Hergest Court.

Hergest Ridge is at the north-west of the parish on the Wales-England border. Along the ridge runs part of Offa's Dyke Path.
