= Rodd, Nash and Little Brampton =

Civil parish in Herefordshire, England

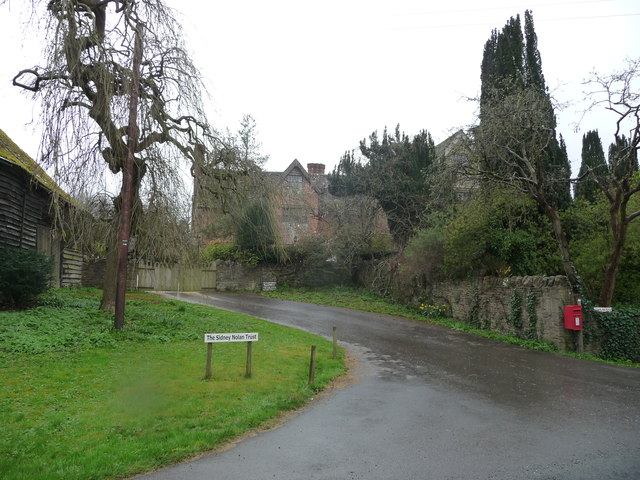
- The Sidney Nolan Trust at The Rodd

- Location within Herefordshire
- OS grid reference: SO3206
  - London: 130 mi (210 km) ESE
- Unitary authority: Herefordshire
- Ceremonial county: Herefordshire
- Region: West Midlands
- Country: England
- Sovereign state: United Kingdom
- Post town: Knighton
- Postcode district: LD8
- Police: West Mercia
- Fire: Hereford and Worcester
- Ambulance: West Midlands
- UK Parliament: North Herefordshire

Rodd, Nash and Little Brampton is a civil parish in the county of Herefordshire, England, and is 18 miles (29 km) north-west from the city and county town of Hereford. The parish borders Powys in Wales at its north-west. Within the parish is the final home and studio of the 20th-century Australian artist Sydney Nolan.

== History ==
Rodd derives from Old English 'rod' or 'rodu', meaning "clearing" or "the clearing", and was in 1220 and 1356 written as 'La Rode'. Nash is from the Old English 'æsc' for "place at the ash-tree", and was in 1239 written as 'Nasche', and in 1291 as 'Nasse'. Brampton is from the Old English 'brōm' with 'tūn', for "place where broom grows", and was in the 11th-century (DB) written as 'Bruntune', and in 1287 as 'Brompton'.

There are three manors associated with Rodd, Nash and Little Brampton in the Domesday Book: at Nash (listed as "Hech"), Little Brampton (listed as "Bruntune"), and Bradley (listed as "Bradelege"), all in Herefordshire, and the Hundred of Hezetre whose Old English name, 'haeseltreo', means "hazel tree". The manors were in the border lands of the Welsh Marches, and in 1086 were parts of the lands and manors of Osbern fitzRichard (Osbern son of Richard), who was tenant-in-chief to king William I. The three manors were described as unpopulated "wastes"—land unusable and untaxed—and listed as with an area defined by 36 ploughlands. Nash and Little Brampton were within the current parish boundary, with Bradley at the south-east and centred on the border with Titley.

Rodd as this settlement's name dates to the 16th century, and from the Rodd family of Presteigne in the early 1500s. Hugh Rodd (born c. 1572), was a miller at Wegnall Mill at the north-east boundary of today's parish on Hindwell Brook, and son to Hugh Rodd (c1540-c1603). James Rodd (born c. 1575), son to Hugh, became Sir James Rodd and MP for Hereford. Richard Rodd (born c.1580), built 'The Rodd' house, 400 yards (366 m) south from Wegnall Mill, as the family seat.

=== 19th century ===
Throughout the 19th century Rodd, Nash and Little Brampton, although part of Herefordshire, and now part of the Wigmore hundred, comprised a township in the Presteigne civil parish. The township was part of the Presteigne county court district, but part of the polling district, petty sessional division and union—poor relief and joint parish workhouse provision set up under the Poor Law Amendment Act 1834—of Kington, later joining the Presteigne union, and by 1885 also part of the Kington county court district. By 1890 the township was part of the Kinsham and Titley polling district and electoral division of the county council. The Titley to Presteigne branch of the Great Western Railway ran through the east of the parish.

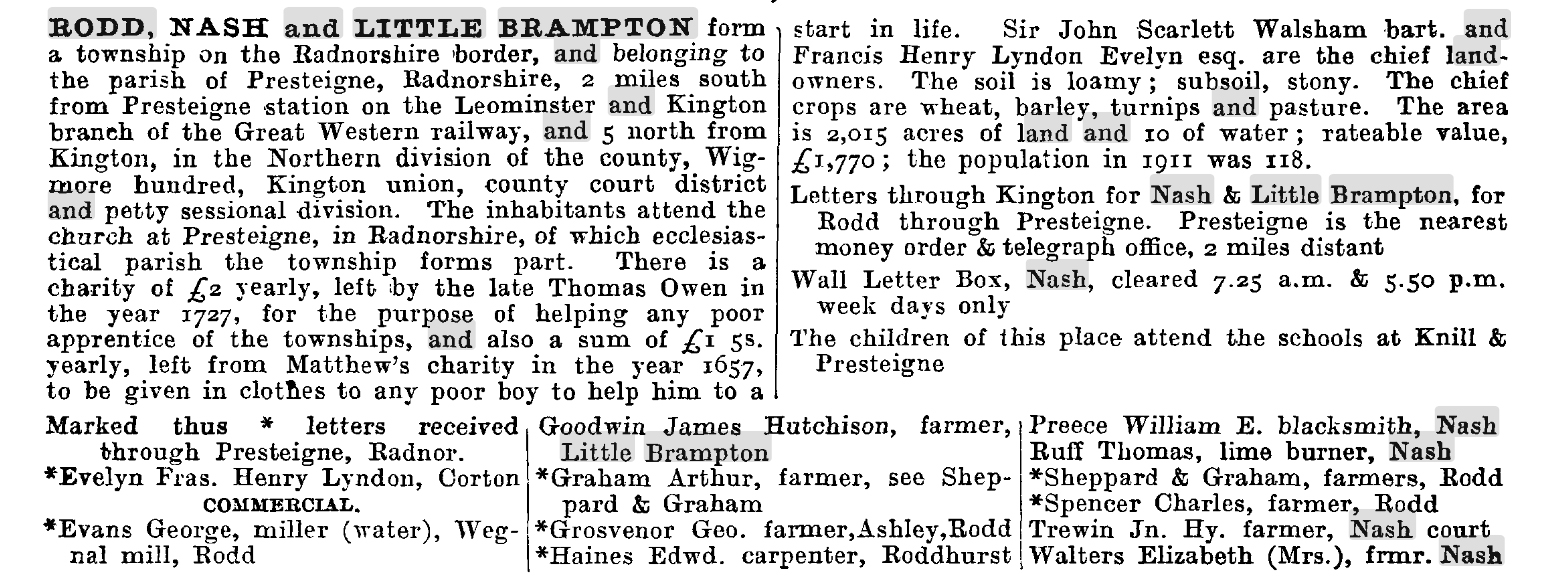
Rodd, Nash & Little Brampton directory entry 1913

Population was 129 in 1801; 157 in 1831; 162 in 1841; 153 in 1861; 143 in 1871; 174 in 1881; 170 in 1891; and 118 in 1911. The township land was 1,968 acres (796 hectares), rising to 2,025 acres (819 hectares) with 10 acres (4.0 hectares) of water by the end of the century. Land is typically listed as loamy, with a stony or limestone subsoil, on which was grown wheat, barley, and roots (such as turnips), with some pasture land. A chief landowner from the middle of the century was Sir John Walsham, 2nd Baronet (1830-1905), JP and foreign diplomat, of Knill Court, succeeded by Sir John Scarlett Walsham, 3rd Baronet (1869–1940), with Sir Harford James Jones-Brydges, 2nd Baronet (1808–1891) listed as a landowner in 1876. The township was part of Presteigne ecclesiastical parish, people attending church, and school, in Presteigne or the neighbouring parish of Knill. A 1657 charity of £1. 5s was "given in clothes to any poor boy to help him to a start in life", and one of £2 yearly was left in 1727 "for the purpose of helping any poor apprentice of the townships". Letters were processed through Kington, with the nearest money order and telegraph office at Presteigne. Occupation listings during the century show typically six farmers, a water miller, a blacksmith, a wheelwright, a carpenter, and a lime burner.

== Governance ==
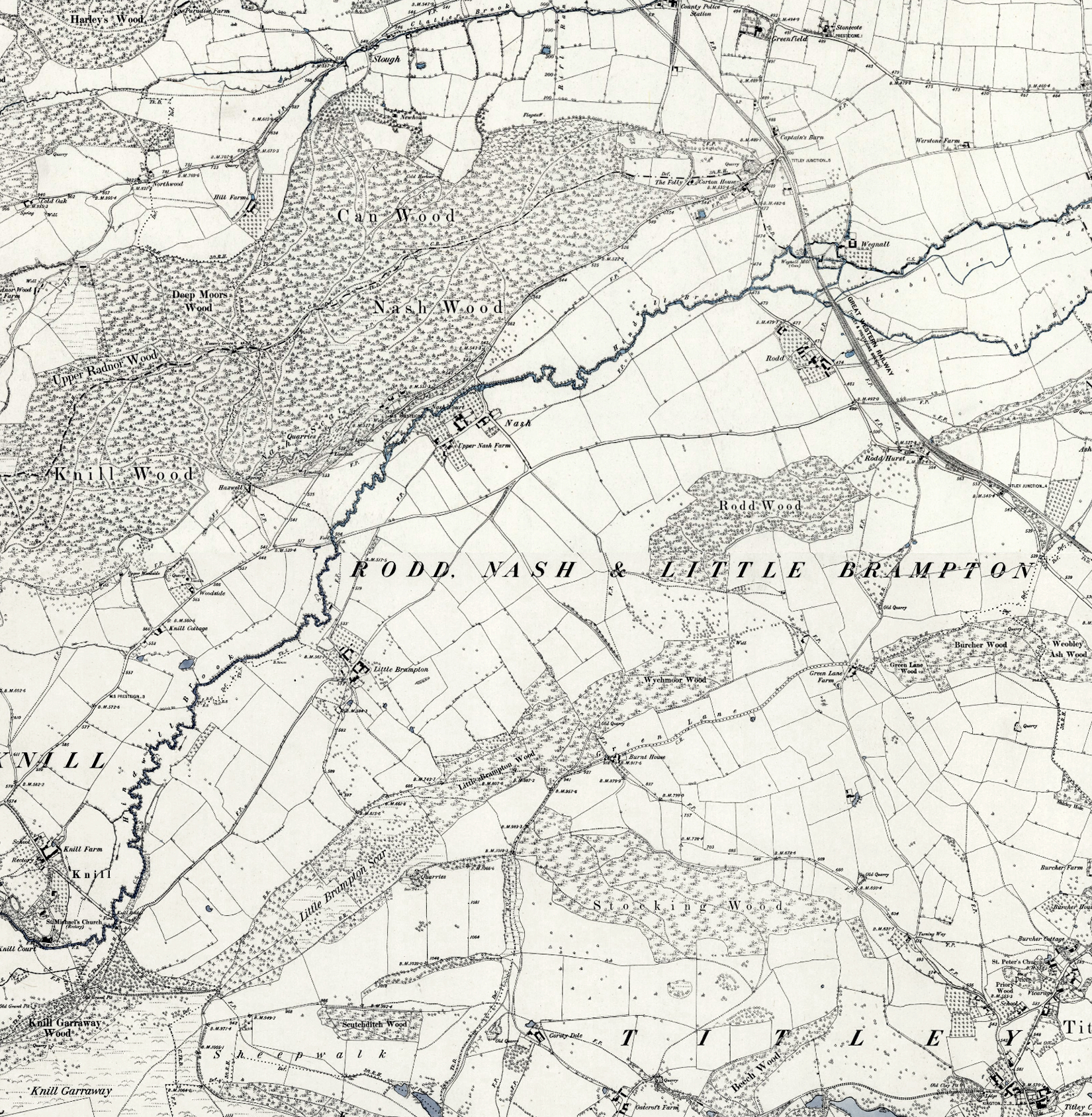
Rodd, Nash & Little Brampton in 1886

Rodd, Nash and Brampton is represented in the lowest tier of UK governance by one member on the ten-member Titley and District Group Parish Council. As Herefordshire is a unitary authority—no district council between parish and county councils—the parish is represented as part of the Arrow Ward on Herefordshire County Council. The parish is represented in the UK parliament as part of the North Herefordshire constituency.

In 1974 Rodd, Nash and Brampton became part of the now defunct Leominster District of the county of Hereford and Worcester, instituted under the Local Government Act 1972. In 2002 the parish, with the parishes of Knill, Lyonshall, Pembridge, Shobdon, Staunton on Arrow and Titley, had been reassessed as part of Pembridge and Lyonshall with Titley Ward which elected one councillor to Herefordshire district council.

== Geography ==
Rodd, Nash and Little Brampton borders Powys in Wales for the entirety of its north-west boundary. Adjacent Herefordshire parishes are Knill at the south-west, Kington at the south, Titley at the south-east, Staunton on Arrow at the east, and Combe at the north. The closest towns from the centre of the parish are the English market town of Kington, 3 miles (5 km) to the south, and the Welsh town of Presteigne, 1.5 miles (2 km) to the north.

The parish, of 2,024 acres (8.19 km^{2}), is orientated north-east to south-west, at the widest approximately 1.5 miles (2 km) from north to south and 2.75 miles (4 km) east to west. It is rural, of farms, arable and pasture fields, managed woodland, water courses, isolated and dispersed businesses, residential properties, and the hamlets of Rodd, Roddhurst, Nash, and Little Brampton. Two minor routes run through the parish. The B4355 Presteigne to Kington road runs north-west to south-east through the east, and through Rodd and Roddhurst. The B4362 road, which runs to the south through Nash, begins at the B4355 at the east and runs beyond the parish to Knill and Walton at the west. These B roads and all adopted highways—not private, but maintained by the local council—are in the north of the parish and include further country lanes and bridleways. Throughout the parish are woodland walks and footpaths, and private farm tracks.

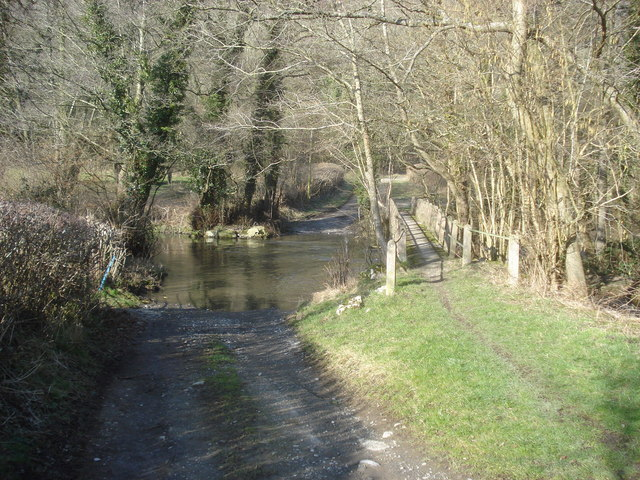
Hindwell Brook at Nash

The parish is within the catchment basin of the River Lugg. Through the valley flowing west to east is the Hindwell Brook tributary, at 150 metres (500 ft) AMSL, which at the east forms the border with Wales, and where it is linked to the southern subsidiary water course of Back Brook which rejoins Hindwell Brook beyond the parish at Combe. To north of Hindwell Brook, and rising immediately from the B4362, is the woodland valley side of Nash Wood, which rises to 310 metres (1,000 ft) over a 400 metres (1,300 ft) horizontal distance, and is the site of quarry workings for a lime kiln mill plant. The valley at the south rises to 330 metres (1,000 ft) at its highest, at the top of which runs ribbon woodland from Knill Garraway Wood at the west, through Little Brampton, Wychmoor and Rodd woods, towards Combe Wood at the east.

== Landmarks ==
There are two Grade II* and thirteen Grade II listed buildings in Rodd, Nash, and Little Brampton, with 74 archaeological sites and historic monuments, and 24 significant sites with research records.

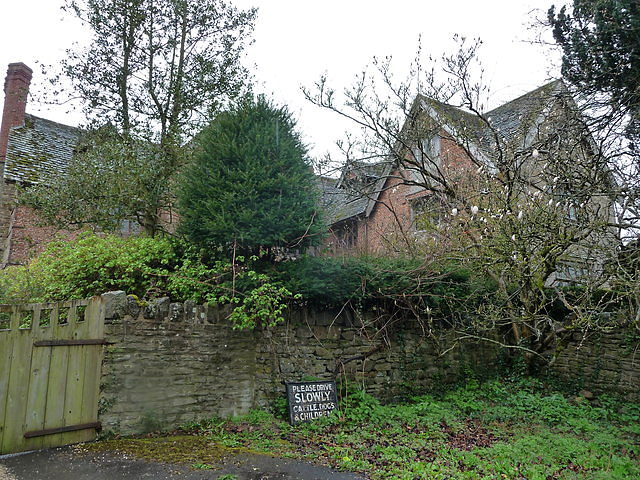
The Rodd

The Rodd, Grade II* listed in 1953, and at 52.257432°N 2.994232°W, is a red brick house dating to 1629, with 20th-century alterations and extension. Of L-plan, it is two-storey with attic and cellar. The central and front porch is a gable reaching to the full height of the house. Within the roof, and either side of the porch, are two gabled dormer windows. The roof return contains further dormers. Windows are mullioned and transomed, with casements. The interior has "remained largely intact retaining many panelled partitions, fireplaces, doorheads and doors". In both an upstairs and downstairs room is an elaborate fireplace surround and mantel, with frieze, arcades, columns, and coat of arms, the room above with a decorative plaster ceiling. According to Burke's and Savile's Guide to Country Houses (1980), the house "is a fine example of its date and importantly retaining most of its original fittings without alteration". The Rodd was, from 1985, the final home and studio of the 20th-century Australian artist Sydney Nolan (1917–1992), and his wife, Mary née Boyd (1926–2016), sister to Arthur Boyd. They established the Sidney Nolan Trust at Rodd, with Lord Lipsey as chairman. The trust was, and is, a residential learning centre for fine art. Adjacent to The Rodd are three Grade II buildings. Little Rodd, timber-framed and dating to the late 15th century, is of two storeys, gabled, jettied, and part weatherboard cladded. Two timber-framed and weatherboarded barns date to the late 17th or early 18th century. These barns were used as studios by Nolan.

Little Brampton Farmhouse, Grade II* listed in 1953, and at 52.246069°N 3.021338°W, dates to the mid-16th century, with 18th- and 20th-century alterations. Of two storeys, the exterior is rendered timber framing, and of a central hall with a jettied cross wing at each end. The two storey front porch is 17th century. Windows are 2- and 3-light casements. The central hall interior contains a "fine cross-beamed ceiling". Attached to the farm house is a listed outbuilding, timber-framed on a sandstone and brick plinth, with a datestone reading "Jonane Robinson hanc structura edificavit Ano Dom 1637" [...this structure is built...1637]. Adjacent Grade II buildings include a further timber-framed slate-roofed farm house, 17th century of single storey and attic with gabled dormers, and a gabled, wooden 19th-century porch. Between the two farm houses is a listed timber-framed 18th-century barn with 19th-century shelter shed adjoined. In the barn is a threshing floor.

At Nash, and adjoining the Hindwell Brook, is Nash Court, listed in 1953 and at 52.255406°N 3.014836°W, which dates to the late 16th century, with 19th-century re-modelling. It comprises a central hall with a doubled cross-wing at the north-east. The hall, with gabled entrance at the south-east, is single storey with attic; the cross-wing of two storeys. Adjacent at the south-west is the timber-framed slate-roofed Upper Nash Farmhouse, which dates to the 15th century, with additions and extensions in the 16th, 17th and 19th centuries. Windows are largely 2-light casements. The interior contains decorative fireplace over mantels. Between Nash Court and Upper Nash Farmhouse are two conjoined barns of L-plan, dating to the late 17th and early 18th century, both timber-framed and weatherboarded, one of which has a threshing floor. At 100 yards (90 m) to the east at 52.255373°N 3.013249°W, is Little Nash, initially a 15th-century vernacular hall house, timber-framed with brick nogging, slate-roofed, and significant for its trussing and cruck frames. The open hall range was converted with an upper floor in, or after the turn of, the 17th century. A cross-wing was added in the 18th century. Windows are 19th-century and cast iron.

Wegnall Mill, at 52.261011°N 2.993792°W, former water mill on the Hindwell Brook at the north-east of the parish. It is slate roofed, timber-framed, weather-boarded, and of three storeys. It was associated with the Rodd family, one of whom was a miller here in the 16th century.

Nash Wood, on the valley hillside at the north of the parish, and bordering Wales, is an historic deciduous woodland, today with conifer in-planting, and includes the Nash Rocks Quarry and limekin, with associated hollow ways and trackways. Archaeological surveys discovered charcoal burning platforms at the east of up to 8m in diameter. On the upper centre slope there is evidence of eight extraction pits 23 quarries, and further quarries on the lower eastern.
