= Hergest =

Hergest (pronounced with a hard g) may refer to:

- Lower Hergest, a hamlet in Herefordshire, England
- Upper Hergest, a hamlet in Herefordshire, England

== See also ==
- Hergest Ridge, a hill on the border between England and Wales
- Hergest Ridge (album), a 1974 album by Mike Oldfield
- Red Book of Hergest, a medieval Welsh manuscript once kept at Hergest Court
- White Book of Hergest, a medieval Welsh manuscript, now lost
