= Staunton on Arrow =

Village in Herefordshire, England

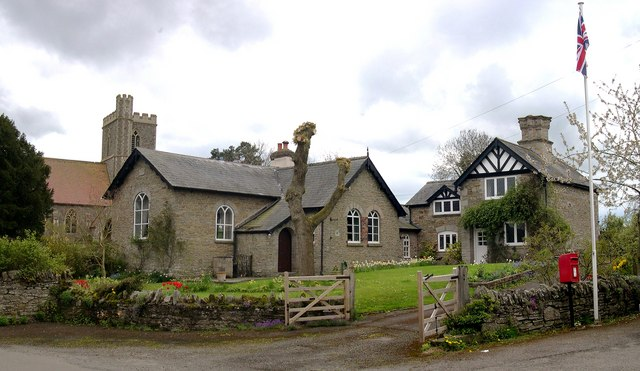
- Former school at Staunton on Arrow

- Location within Herefordshire
- OS grid reference: SO367604
  - London: 150 mi (240 km) SE
- Unitary authority: Herefordshire
- Ceremonial county: Herefordshire
- Region: West Midlands
- Country: England
- Sovereign state: United Kingdom
- Post town: LEOMINSTER
- Postcode district: HR6
- Dialling code: 01544
- Police: West Mercia
- Fire: Hereford and Worcester
- Ambulance: West Midlands
- UK Parliament: North Herefordshire

Staunton on Arrow is a village and civil parish in the county of Herefordshire, England. The village is 17 miles (27 km) north-west of Hereford and 8 miles (13 km) to the west of Leominster. Within the parish is the site of the Iron Age hill fort of Wapley Hill.

== History ==
Staunton derives from the Old English 'stān' with 'tūn' meaning"farmstead on stony ground, or one near a standing stone". It was written as 'Stantun' in 938, and as 'Stantune' in the Domesday Book of 1086. 'Arrow' is a Celtic word meaning 'swift'.

Listed in Domesday are three manors within today's Staunton on Arrow parish area, two at Staunton, and one at Wapley, all in the Hundred of Hezetre whose Old English name, 'haeseltreo', means "hazel tree". The manors were in the border lands of the Welsh Marches. One manor at Staunton and the manor of Wapley were, by 1086, owned by Osbern fitzRichard (Osbern son of Richard), who was tenant-in-chief to king William I. Staunton, owned by Seisyll in 1066, contained six villagers, four smallholders— who owned about five acres of land—and four slaves, and had a ploughland area defined by two lord's plough teams and four men's plough teams. Wapley, which had previously been owned by Osbern under overlord Queen Edith in 1066, contained one villager, 22 smallholders, and one riding man (radman)—a messenger or escort—in a ploughland area defined as six men's plough teams, and was retained by Osbern in 1086. The lord of the second manor at Staunton in 1066 was Edric the Wild, lordship transferred in 1086 to Ralph of Mortimer, who was also tenant-in-chief. This manor contained six villagers and three smallholders with ploughlands of two lord's plough teams and four men's plough teams.

=== 19th century ===
In the 1850s Staunton on Arrow was directory listed as 'Stanton-on-Arrow'. The parish was also a township, and in the Stretford and Wigmore hundreds (previously in the Hezetre hundred). It was part of the Union—poor relief and joint parish workhouse provision set up under the Poor Law Amendment Act 1834—and petty sessional and county court district of Kington, and the Archdeaconry and Diocese of Hereford. The church, in "an ornamental Gothic style" ", with six bells and register dating to 1558, was constructed in 1854. The ecclesiastical parish living was a vicarage, and included a residence for the clergy, and about 35 acres (14 hectares) glebe—an area of land used to support the parish church and priest—in the gift of the Lord Chancellor, in 1856 Robert Monsey Rolfe, 1st Baron Cranworth. The rectorial tithes—typically one-tenth of the produce or profits of the land given to the rector for his services—were commuted in 1841 under the 1836 Tithe Commutation Act, and were here substituted at this time with a £172 11s. yearly rent-charge payment. The two impropriators—lay persons or higher church authorities into whose personal ownership church income or property is transferred—were the Bishop of Hereford, and James King-King MP for Herefordshire who lived at Stanton Park, a house and deer park established in the 1770s to the north from Staunton on Arrow village, and the family seat of the King family. King-King was lord of the manor and, with Lady Langdale and Sir Thomas Hastings CB, was one of the chief landowners of the parish. He was also a Justice of the Peace, Deputy Lieutenant, and High Sheriff of Herefordshire, and chairman of a railway committee, incorporated in 1874, for the construction of a 12 miles (19 km) stretch of railway between Leominster and Bromyard, linking two Great Western lines.

Listed are the hamlets of Horseway Head and Stanton Bach, as are the further landmarks and areas of Stanton Green, Upper Mowley, and Upper Tan House. A mixed free school, supported by voluntary donations, was erected in 1842 for 60 children. Population in 1851 was 359, within a parish area of just over 2,728 acres (1,104 hectares). Residents and occupations in the 1850s included the parish vicar, the schoolmistress of the free school, eight farmers, one of whom was also a miller, a builder, two blacksmiths, a wheelwright, carpenter, butcher, mason, shopkeeper, linen weaver, and a boot & shoe maker.

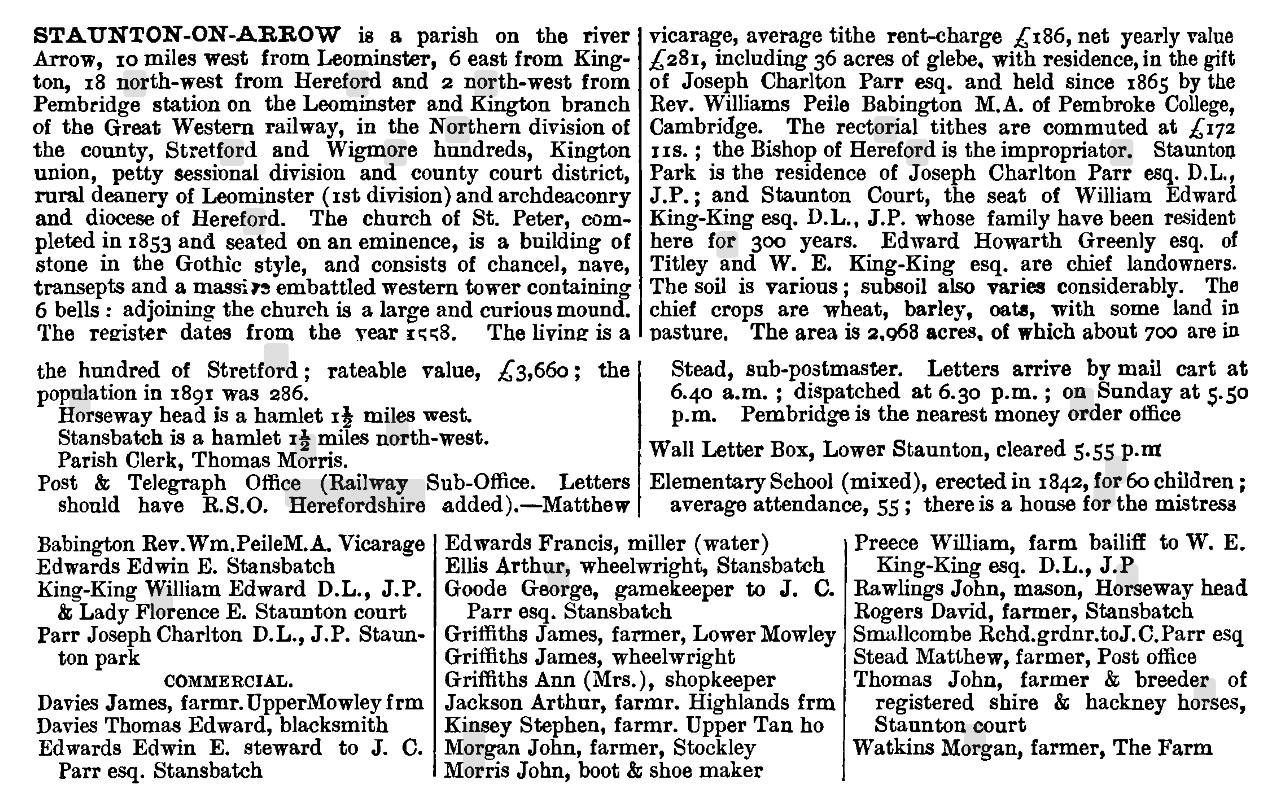
Staunton on Arrow directory entry, 1895

In the 1880s and 1890s the parish land and subsoil is described as 'various'. Area had risen to 2,925 acres (1,184 hectares), on which were grown wheat, barley and oats, with some land as pasture. Population was 340 in 1881, 286 in 1891, and 311 in 1911. Glebe land by the first decade of the 20th century had reduced to 4 acres (1.6 hectares). By 1890 the 1842 free school had become a mixed National School supported by subscription, and with a new classroom added, accommodating 61 children with an average attendance of 53. Following the 1902 Education Act, the school became a Public Elementary. St Peter's Church was restored in 1900 as a commemoration to the Diamond Jubilee of Queen Victoria. The Titley to Presteigne branch of the Great Western Railway ran through the west of the parish, with its Railway Sub Office part of the parish sub post office where other mail arrived by mail cart from Leominster. The nearest money order and telegraph offices were at Pembridge and Shobden. By the early 20th century the parish post office was its own telegraph office. Staunton Court was the residence of the King-King family, who had been resident "for 300 years" and were chief landowners, and whose late 19th-century occupant, William Edward King-King was at the time a Justice of the Peace and Deputy Lieutenant for Herefordshire. Residencies and occupations from 1880 included the local JP, the schoolmistress and her assistant mistress, the parish clerk, and the parish priest at the vicarage. There were, variously, eight to nine farmers, one of whom was also a shopkeeper & sub-postmaster, a miller, two wheelwrights, one of whom was also a shopkeeper & machinist and another, a carpenter. There were a tailor and a blacksmith at Stansbatch, a stonemason at Horseway Head, and a boot & shoe maker. Later were listed a gamekeeper, a gardener, a farm bailiff, and a farmer who was a breeder of registered shire and hackney horses.

== Governance ==
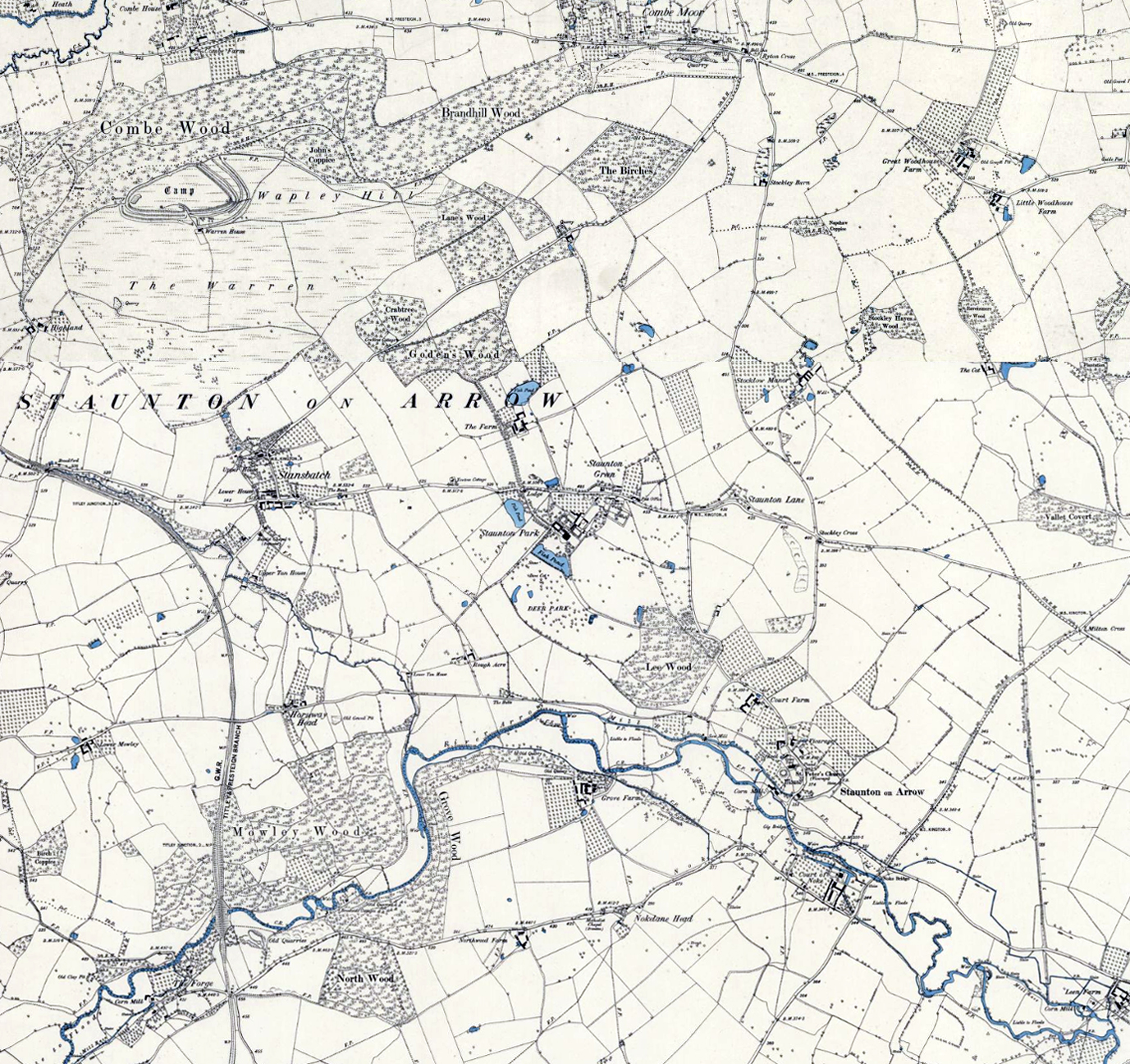
Staunton on Arrow in 1886

Staunton on Arrow is represented in the lowest tier of UK governance on the ten-member Titley Group Parish Council, which also includes the parishes of Knill, Rodd, Nash and Little Brampton, and Titley. As Herefordshire is a unitary authority—no district council between parish and county councils—the parish is represented as part of the Arrow Ward on Herefordshire County Council. Staunton on Arrow is represented in the UK parliament as part of the North Herefordshire constituency.

In 1974 Staunton on Arrow became part of the now defunct Leominster District of the county of Hereford and Worcester, instituted under the Local Government Act 1972. In 2002 the parish, with the parishes of Knill, Lyonshall, Pembridge, Shobdon, Rodd, Nash and Little Brampton and Titley, had been reassessed to be part of Pembridge and Lyonshall with Titley Ward which elected one councillor to Herefordshire district council.

== Geography ==
The parish, of 2,956 acres (12.0 km^{2}), is approximately 2 miles (3 km) from north to south and 3 miles (5 km) east to west, with a 2011 population of 234 at a density of 18.58 per km2. Adjacent parishes are Combe at the north, Byton at the north-east, Rodd, Nash and Little Brampton at the north-west, Pembridge at the south and east, and Titley at the west. The parish is rural, of farms, fields, managed woodland and coppices, water courses, lakes, isolated and dispersed businesses, and residential properties, the village of Staunton on Arrow, and the hamlets of Burcher, Stansbatch and Horseway Head. The parish is within, and exclusively on the northern bank of, the catchment basin of the River Arrow which flows west to east and forms the parish border with Pembridge, the valley bottom at 120 metres (400 ft) AMSL, rising to 320 metres (1,000 ft) at Wapley Hill.

The only numbered minor route is the north to south B4355 Presteigne to Kington road through the west of the parish, and north from Burcher. There are two adopted minor highways—maintained by the local council—both west to east and linking from the B4533 to Pembridge, the northern route running through Stansbatch, the southern from Burcher through Horseway Head and Staunton on Arrow village. At the village are two roads connecting to the northern road, one of which continues out of the parish to the Combe Moor hamlet in Byton. A farther route to the west of the village runs north-east from Stansbatch, along the south-east edge of Wapley Hill, to Combe Moor. Other routes include country lanes, bridleways, woodland walks, footpaths, and private farm tracks.

== Community ==
The nearest hospital is Knighton Community Hospital to the north at Knighton in Wales, with the nearest major hospital Hereford County Hospital to the south-east at Hereford. The nearest primary school is Pembridge C of E School at Pembridge. The parish falls for state education under the mixed secondary school catchment area for Weobley High School at Weobley, 6 miles (10 km) to the south-east. Lucton School, an independent, co-educational, day and boarding school at Lucton, is 5 miles (8 km) to the north-east.

The Anglican parish church of St Peter's, in Staunton on Arrow village, is in the 31-parish Kington and Weobley Deanery of the Diocese of Hereford. It is part of the rural six-parish Arrowvale Group benefice comprising, with St Peter's, St Mary's at Byton, St Michael and All Angels at Lyonshall, St John the Evangelist at Shobdon, St Mary's at Pembridge, and Moorcourt Chapel (St Mary's) at Moorcot in Pembridge. To the north of the church is the village hall.

Within the village is an engineering company and a bed & breakfast establishment; two further bed & breakfasts are at Standbatch. In the west of the parish is a holiday home, an excavator screening bucket supplier, and an online clothing & accessories business. At the north-east is an auto services centre.

Staunton on Arrow is served by no bus routes through the parish. The closest are the Kington to Knighton route with stops at Titley in the south-west; and the Shobdon to Leominster, and Leominster to Pembridge circular routes, with a stop at the far eastern edge of the parish.

The closest National Rail connection is at Leominster railway station, 8 miles (13 km) to the east, and Hereford railway station, 16 miles (26 km) to the south-west on the Crewe to Newport Welsh Marches Line. Farther east, at Worcester, are Worcester Foregate Street, Shrub Hil, and Worcestershire Parkway railway stations, with connections to London, Birmingham, Oxford, Bristol, Nottingham and Cardiff.

== Landmarks ==
There are six Grade II listed buildings in Staunton on Arrow.

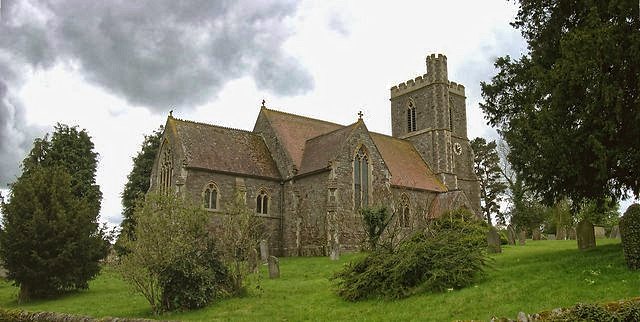
St Peter's Church,

The Anglican parish church of St Peter (listed in 1986 and at 52.235101°N 2.923803°W), is an 1856 rebuild of the 1853 demolished church, to the Gothic Revival Decorated style designs of Thomas Nicholson, under the auspices of James King-King of Staunton Park. The church, completed in 1860, is of sandstone and ashlar construction, and comprises a four-bay nave; a two-bay chancel with a vestry at the south; a north porch attached to the nave; and north and south transepts with chapels, the south being dedicated to the King-King family and containing a corner fireplace. The three-stage (floor) west tower, with six bells and with a clock on its north face, is buttressed and with an embattled parapet. At the north-east side of the tower is an external hexagonal stair turret which rises above the roofline of the tower. The chancel and chapels contain traceried windows in Decorated style. The font is contemporary with the building and is inset with panel tracery. At the south-east of the churchyard is a walled enclosure, originally used to house straying animals. At the north corner of the churchyard is a war memorial cross to those who died in the First and Second World Wars. At the south-west of the church is a 28 feet (9 m) high, 63 feet (19 m) diameter castle mound earthwork (at 52.234819°N 2.924328°W), surrounded by a 2 feet (0.6 m) deep ditch, the remains of an 11th- to 16th-century motte-and-bailey castle.

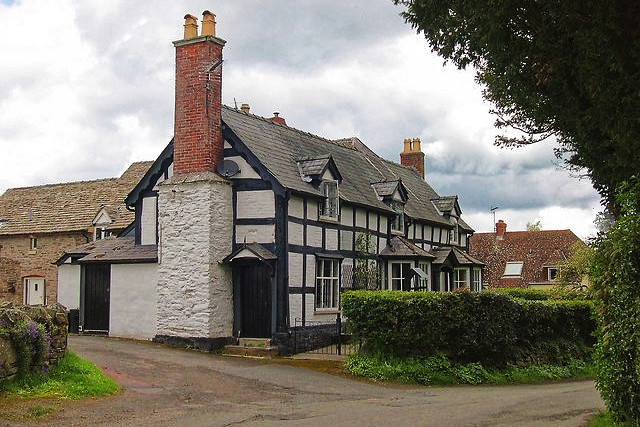
'The Post Office'

Staunton Old Hall, 350 yards (320.0 m) north from the church (listed in 1953 and at 52.237532°N 2.925916°W), is a late 16th- or early 17th-century farmhouse, two-storey, slate-roofed, and timber-framed with painted wattle and daub and brick infills. Windows are partly mullioned and transomed, with casements. The interior contains a 17th-century staircase. The Post Office, 100 yards (91.4 m) north from the church (listed in 1986 and at 52.236004°N 2.924281°W), is a house dating to the 17th or early 18th century, with 19th century alterations. It is single storey with attic, and timber-framed with painted brick infills. The roof is slate with three dormer windows. Window frames are casements, except those in two ground floor bay windows which are sash.

Highland (listed in 1986 and at 52.251816°N 2.968666°W), within a farm at the north-west of the parish and south-west of Wapley Hill, is 2.5 miles (4.0 km) north-west from the church. It is a 15th- to 17th-century farmhouse with 19th-century alterations, of T-plan, and of stone with stone-tiled roof, single storey with attic, and with casement windows and a canopied front entrance.

Lower Mowley (listed in 1986 and at 52.236096°N 2.966177°W), is a farmhouse at the south-west of the parish and 1.8 miles (3 km) west from the church, dating from the 17th century, with later extensions in the late 18th, and alterations in the 20th. It is timber-framed infilled with wattle and daub and part painted brick, and of five bays, two storeys with casement windows, and slate roof. The interior contains a 19th-century staircase, a room with cross-beamed ceiling and original plaster decoration. There is panelling with "circular enrichments with conventional devices, and small trees with birds in the spandrels". On the opposite, north, side of the road is a listed 17th-century timber-framed and weatherboarded barn of four bays and an interior threshing floor.

=== Wapley Camp ===
Wapley Camp is an Iron Age hill fort on Wapley Hill, at 52.256591°N 2.959933°W, of 25 acres (10 hectares), and at an elevation of 1,050 feet (320 m), in the north of the parish and bordering Combe Wood in Combe. The camp is triangular in footprint, with five ramparts, and medial ditches and berms around the south and east sides, and an entrance though the ramparts at the south. The north-west side of the triangle, where the steep scarp forms a natural defence, is largely devoid of ramparts. A further entrance, accessed by a causeway along the scarp edge, is at the north point of the triangle. Three pillow mounds are within the ramparts, possibly remnants of post-medieval rabbit warrens. The Warren (hillside) to the south of the camp, which contains further warren mounds, was previously open waste, but today is a Forestry England plantation. The camp may have been a defensive site occupied by the Silures clans during the Roman conquest of Britain.
