= John Clanvowe =

Anglo-Welsh writer, c. 1341–1391

Arms of Clanvowe: Paly of six or and azure, on a fess gules three mullets or

Sir John Clanvowe (c. 1341 – 17 October 1391) was a Welsh diplomat, poet and chamber knight to Richard II. He was born to a Marcher family and was possibly of mixed Anglo-Welsh origin, holding lands that would lie in the present-day Radnorshire district of Powys and in Herefordshire.

== Career ==
Clanvowe was born in Hergest, Herefordshire, (Note: There are two Herefordshire villages called Hergest: Lower Hergest and Upper Hergest, It is unclear which was his birthplace.) and was a descendant of Hywel ap Meurig of Radnorshire. His royal career began in 1373 with service to Edward III, probably through family connections after his father served as a squire to the royal household. Clanvowe then built up relations in the royal court, notably with William Neville, who also became a chamber knight. In Richard II's reign (1377–1399), however, Clanvowe started to gain more political notoriety, gaining royal trust that made him a chamber knight in 1381. The role mainly involved maintaining the peace in his home county of Herefordshire, while using his local following to increase the king's popularity. His role in the royal household ended in dismissal in 1388, but he remained politically active and was present at peace negotiations with France in 1389 that resulted in a three-year truce.

Outside the royal chamber, Clanvowe was a personal friend of Geoffrey Chaucer. He is believed to be one of the first to hear The Knight's Tale in its free-standing form in 1380, before Chaucer included it in The Canterbury Tales. Historian John Bowers has suggested that the main Knight's Tale theme may have been written about the brotherhood and knightly love between Clanvowe and his companion (and possible lover) Neville. In 1386 Clanvowe and Chaucer gave evidence in Scrope's favour in the Scrope v. Grosvenor case in the Court of Chivalry, when Lord Scrope of Bolton and Sir Robert Grosvenor fell out over the right to bear a certain coat of arms.

Clanvowe's death came on 17 October 1391, on the way to Constantinople with a sworn companion, William Neville, perhaps on pilgrimage to the holy city. Neville died two days later (19 October 1391), apparently inconsolable after the passing of his sworn companion Clanvowe. They were buried together in a joint tomb discovered in 1913 in Istanbul's Arap Mosque. Their tomb slab also suggests a close relationship, with their coats of arms impaled on both shields in a way usually reserved for married couples.

=== Military life ===
Clanvowe was probably an apprentice of Humphrey Du Bohun, 7th Earl of Hereford, also from Herefordshire, whom he may have joined on the crusade to Alexandria in 1365, when the city was sacked by the crusading party. Early in his career, Clanvowe was involved in military campaigns to France during The Hundred Years War, first being posted in Brittany in 1364.

Clanvowe was later involved in the 1373 and 1378 expeditions to France led by John of Gaunt. In 1390, he enlisted on the Barbary Crusade led by Louis II, Duke of Bourbon against Tunis, for which traditional crusading indulgences were offered. This ended in a peace treaty after a nine-week siege.

== Religion ==
Sir John Clanvowe has been noted for unorthodox, potentially heretical religious views. The English chronicler Thomas Walsingham included him as one of the seven "lollard knights" in Richard II's reign.

Yet historians have debated the extent of Clanvowe's heresies. Studying Clanvowe's devotional treatise "The Two Ways", McFarlane has argued that heresy can be seen where the knight fails to discuss many parts of the English Church he would in that case have rejected, for example the efficacy of the sacrament. Clanvowe's reliance here on biblical texts suggests he needed no intermediary between him and God. Anne Hudson, on the other hand, claimed that the work contains nothing derived from Wycliffe and reflects Puritanical views, not those of a heretic.

== Works ==
Clanvowe probably wrote The Two Ways while on his 1391 expedition to Constantinople, beyond the authority of the English Church. The work describes how one can follow the narrow way to heaven and avoid the broad way to hell. Here he condemns his own knightly class, claiming they (and other Christians) should live a meek life and avoid indulging in the pleasures of this world, which can only lead to hell.

Clanvowe's best-known work was The Book of Cupid, God of Love or The Cuckoo and the Nightingale, a debate poem influenced by Chaucer's Parliament of Fowls. Here the nightingale praises love, but the cuckoo mocks it for causing more trouble than joy. Staley too has claimed the poem can be seen as a criticism of elaborate courtly language under Richard II, with the nightingale complaining that the cuckoo is too hard to understand. It is written as a literary dream vision and serves as an example of medieval debate poetry.

Clanvowe was first mentioned in modern times in 1896, in the History of English Literature by F. S. Ellis. The Cuckoo and the Nightingale had previously been attributed to Chaucer, but the Encyclopedia of Medieval Literature notes the absence of direct evidence of that when linking Clanvowe with the work.
