= Combe Moor =

Hamlet in Herefordshire, England

Coordinates: 52.262254°N 2.933771°W

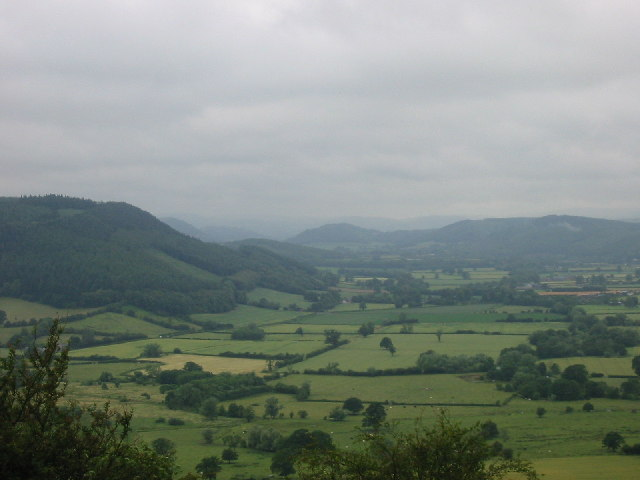
- Combe Moor and Byton Moor, just north of the village

- Location within Herefordshire
- OS grid reference: SO368630
  - London: 135 mi (217 km)
- Unitary authority: Herefordshire
- Ceremonial county: Herefordshire
- Region: West Midlands
- Country: England
- Sovereign state: United Kingdom
- Post town: Presteigne
- Postcode district: LD8
- Police: West Mercia
- Fire: Hereford and Worcester
- Ambulance: West Midlands
- UK Parliament: Hereford and South Herefordshire

Combe Moor, also known as Coombes Moor, is a linear hamlet in the civil parish of Byton in Herefordshire, England, to the south-east of the Welsh town of Presteigne, near the border with Wales, and 17 miles (27 km) north-west from the county town of Hereford.

== Geography ==
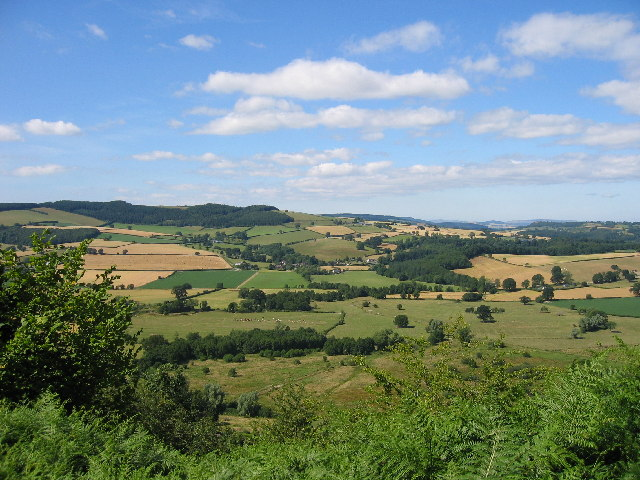
View from the Herefordshire Trail leading to Wapley Hillfort

The village is on the B4362 road on the B4362 road between Shobdon and Presteigne near the confluence of the Hindwell Brook and the River Lugg. During the Devensian period, "the eastward advance of the Wye Glacier blocked the preglacial Lugg at Combe Moor and the river cut a new course to the north-east before turning south-east through the east-to-west ridge via the Covenhope Gap." Cross and Hodgson described the sediments of the Combe Moor basin in 1975 as "finely laminated and stoneless."

Combe Moor lies to the south-east of Combe, just to the south-west of the village of Byton. Brandhill Wood lies to the south and Park Hill to the north-east. The moor to the north of the village is called Byton Moor and there is also a moor of the same name as the village just to the west of that. The Herefordshire Trail long distance footpath passes through the village.

== Landmarks ==
The Herefordshire Trail leads to Wapley Hillfort. There is an old schoolhouse to the north-east along the road to Byton. Mistletoe House in the village is a tea room and gallery. Other cottages in the vicinity include Rue Cottage in the village itself and Wapley cottage along the lane to the south-east.
