= Council House, Malvern =

Municipal building in Great Malvern, Worcestershire, England

The Council House
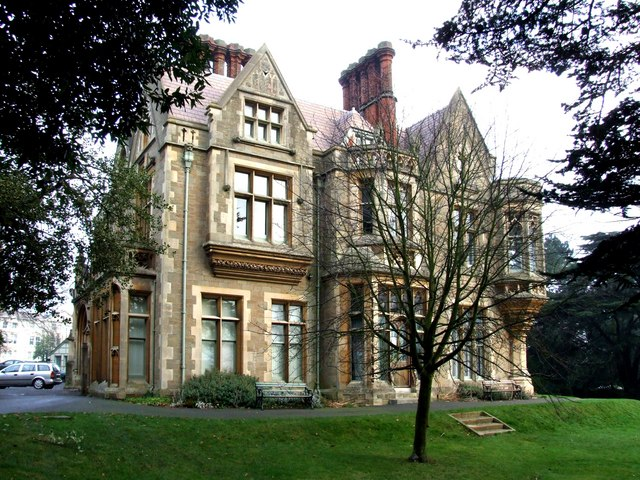
- The building in 2007

- Shown in Worcestershire
- 52.1111°N 2.3247°W
- Location: Avenue Road, Great Malvern

History
- Built: 1880

Site notes
- Architect: Henry Haddon
- Architectural style: Perpendicular Gothic style

Listed Building – Grade II*
- Official name: The Council House (Malvern Hills District Council Offices)
- Designated: 11 May 1979
- Reference no.: 1156369

The Council House is a municipal building in Avenue Road in Great Malvern, a town in Worcestershire in England. The building, which accommodates the headquarters of Malvern Hills District Council, is a Grade II* listed building.

== History ==
The first building on the site was Nether Court, a grange of Great Malvern Priory, which lay among fields and dated from the mediaeval period. It was sold for the construction of housing in 1846. In 1847, a house named The Priory was built on the site for a medical doctor, James Manby Gully, who was prominent in establishing hydrotherapy in Malvern.

The property was purchased by a South American merchant, Albert Miles Speer, who demolished it in 1873. He commissioned a new and larger house, construction of which started in 1874. It was designed by Henry Haddon in the Perpendicular Gothic style, built by Collins and Cullins of Tewkesbury in coursed stone and was completed in 1880. The carving was undertaken by William Forsyth, while stained glass was designed by Heaton, Butler and Bayne.

In 1909, the building was converted into a preparatory school, known as The Priory School, and a gymnasium and swimming pool were constructed in the grounds. The proprietors of school were the Jones family, first Ebenezer Lloyd Jones, and then his son, Edward Harold Lloyd Jones.

In 1925, the property was purchased by Malvern Urban District Council, to serve as its headquarters. The grounds were annexed to become part of Priory Park. Following local government re-organisation in 1974, the building became the offices and meeting place of the old Malvern Hills District Council, which converted the gymnasium into its council chamber. The building was grade II* listed in 1979. In 1998, following boundary changes, it became the headquarters of the current Malvern Hills District Council.

== Architecture ==
The building is constructed of coursed stone, with brick chimneys and a tiled roof, with a service wing of yellow brick, and a conservatory of wood and glass. It has a broadly square plan, with a full-height central hall. The service wing extends north, and the conservatory and billiards room extends to the east. It is asymmetrical and is fenestrated by mullioned and transomed windows. It features a projecting porch, which encloses a round-headed opening with an archivolt, and which is flanked by elaborately carved pilasters surmounted by carvings of animals. There is a four-storey stair tower, with a spire turret. Inside, there is much carved wood and tilework. The principal rooms include the council chamber and the Elgar Room, which is used for weddings and civil partnership ceremonies. The gate posts are also listed.
