= Birtley, Herefordshire =

Hamlet in Herefordshire, England

Coordinates: 52.318°N 2.931°W

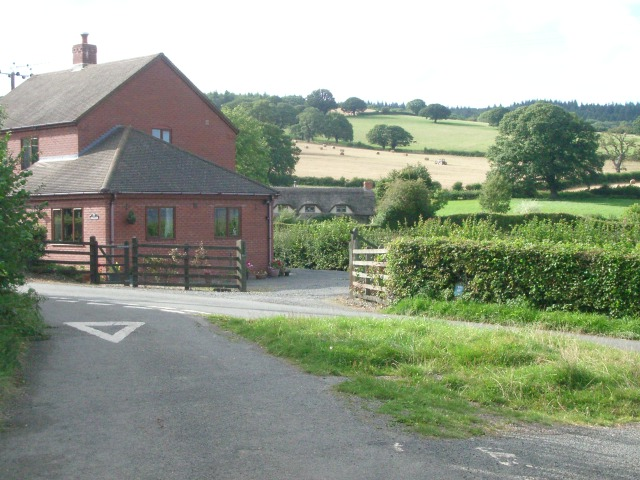
Junction at Birtley

Birtley is a hamlet in north Herefordshire, in England. It is situated to the west of Ludlow and Leominster, approximately 16 km (9.9 mi) from both towns. It is part of the civil parish of Lingen.
