= Malvern Hills District (1974–1998) =

Malvern Hills
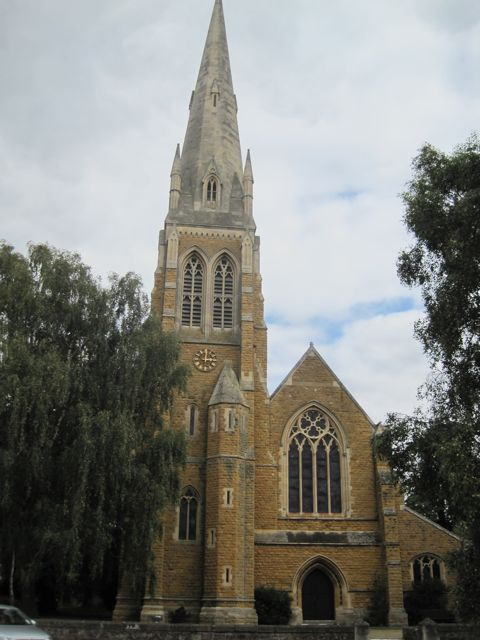

- History
  - Created: 1 April 1974
  - Abolished: 1 April 1998
  - Succeeded by: Malvern Hills, Herefordshire
- Status: non-metropolitan district

Malvern Hills is a former non-metropolitan district of Hereford and Worcester, England from 1974 to 1998.

== History ==
The district was created on 1 April 1974 under the Local Government Act 1972, which also merged the former administrative counties of Herefordshire and Worcestershire into a new county of Hereford and Worcester. The new district covered the area of five former districts, which were all abolished at the same time:

- Bromyard Rural District
- Ledbury Rural District
- Malvern Urban District
- Martley Rural District
- Upton upon Severn Rural District

The Bromyard and Ledbury rural districts had been part of Herefordshire prior to the 1974 reforms; the other three had been in Worcestershire. The district was named Malvern Hills after the range of hills which ran through the centre of the district. Malvern Hills was one of two districts created in Hereford and Worcester which straddled the old county boundary, the other being Leominster district, created from five Herefordshire districts plus the Tenbury Rural District from Worcestershire.

On 1 April 1998 the district was abolished, with its territory divided between a new Malvern Hills District in Worcestershire (which also included part of the former Leominster district), and a new unitary authority of Herefordshire.

The district council was based at the Council House in Great Malvern, a Grade II* listed building.

=== Political control ===
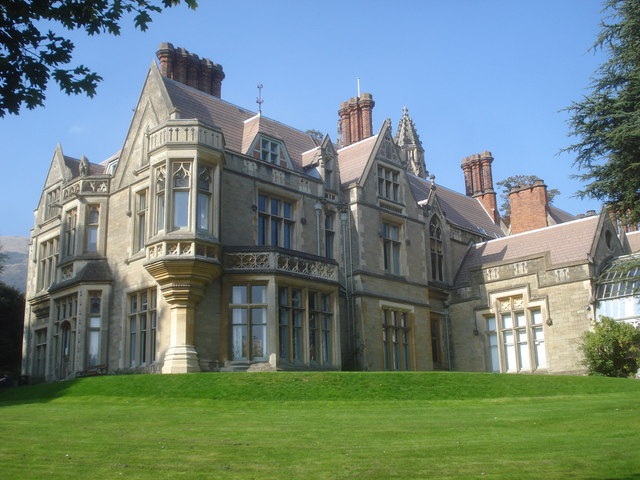
Council House (completed 1880), situated in Priory Park, Great Malvern

The first election to the council was held in 1973, initially operating as a shadow authority alongside the outgoing authorities until it came into its powers on 1 April 1974. A shadow authority was again elected in 1997 ahead of the significant district boundary changes which came into effect on 1 April 1998.

Unusually, the district council was never under the control of a major national political party: it was run by independents from 1974 to 1987 and from 1991 to 1995, and was under no overall control at other times.

Party in control	Years
Independent	1974–1987
No overall control	1987–1991
Independent	1991–1995
No overall control	1995–1998
