= Walsham baronets =

Baronetcy in the Baronetage of the United Kingdom

- Escutcheon of the Walsham baronets of Knill Court
- Creation date: 1831
- Status: extinct
- Extinction date: 2019
- Motto: Sub libertate quietem, Peace only under liberty.

The Walsham Baronetcy, of Knill Court in the County of Hereford, was a title in the Baronetage of the United Kingdom. It was created on 30 September 1831 for John James Walsham. He received the baronetcy as the eldest co-heir and representative of Sir Thomas Morgan, 1st Baronet (a title which had become extinct on the death of the fourth Baronet in 1767; see Morgan baronets, of Llangatock). The second Baronet was Envoy Extraordinary and Minister Plenipotentiary to China from 1885 to 1892 and to Romania from 1892 to 1893. The fourth Baronet was a rear admiral in the Royal Navy.

== Walsham baronets, of Knill Court (1831) ==
- Sir John James Walsham, 1st Baronet (1805–1874)
- Sir John Walsham, 2nd Baronet (1830–1905)
- Sir John Scarlett Walsham, 3rd Baronet (1869–1940)
- Sir John Scarlett Warren Walsham, 4th Baronet (1910–1992)
- Sir Timothy John Walsham, 5th Baronet (1939–2011)
- Sir Gerald Percy Robert Walsham, 6th Baronet (1939–2019). He left no heir, and the title was extinct at his death.

== See also ==
- Morgan baronets

== Notes ==
Baronetage of the United Kingdom
| Preceded by Slade baronets | Walsham baronets of Knill Court; 30 September 1831 | Succeeded by Wrixon-Becher baronets |
