= Lower Harpton =

Civil parish in Herefordshire, England

Coordinates: 52.235362°N 3.0609152°W

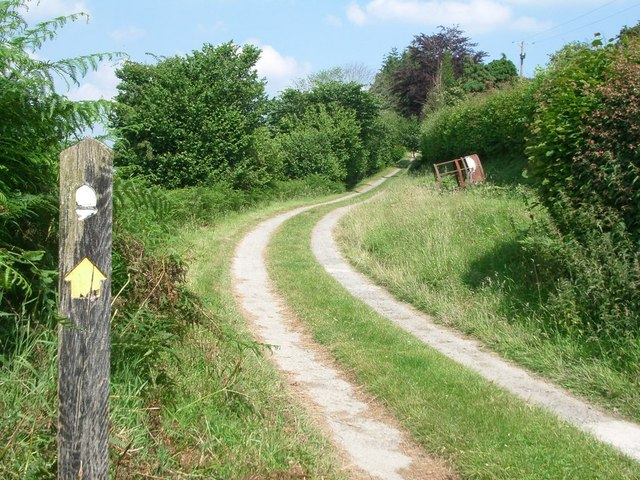

- Location within Herefordshire
- Area: 3.412 km^{2} (1.317 sq mi)
- Population: 33 (2001 census)
  - Density: 10/km^{2} (26/sq mi)
- Civil parish: Lower Harpton
- Unitary authority: County of Herefordshire
- Ceremonial county: Herefordshire
- Region: West Midlands
- Country: England
- Sovereign state: United Kingdom
- Police: West Mercia
- Fire: Hereford and Worcester
- Ambulance: West Midlands

Lower Harpton is a settlement and civil parish about 2.5 miles of Knighton, in the county of Herefordshire, England. In 2001, the parish had a population of 33. The parish touches Kington Rural, Knill and Old Radnor in Wales. Lower Harpton shares a parish council with Kington Rural.

== Landmarks ==
There is 1 listed building in Lower Harpton called Dunfield House which is Grade II listed.

== History ==
Lower Harpton was recorded in the Domesday Book as Hercope. Lower Harpton was formerly a township in the parish of Old Radnor, in 1866 Lower Harpton became a civil parish in its own right.
