= Willey, Herefordshire =

Civil parish in Herefordshire, England

Coordinates: 52.29759°N 2.95943°W

Willey
- Location within Herefordshire
- Population: 61
- OS grid reference: SO346670
- Unitary authority: Herefordshire
- Ceremonial county: Herefordshire
- Region: West Midlands
- Country: England
- Sovereign state: United Kingdom
- Post town: PRESTEIGNE
- Postcode district: LD8
- Dialling code: + 44 (0)1544
- Police: West Mercia
- Fire: Hereford and Worcester
- Ambulance: West Midlands
- UK Parliament: North Herefordshire

Willey is a civil parish in Herefordshire, on the Welsh-English borders. The main source of employment is farming and there were a total of 61 residents in the parish at the 2001 census. The parish borders on Stapleton, Lingen and Presteigne.
