= Stapleton, Herefordshire =

Village in Herefordshire, England

Coordinates: 52.285°N 2.992°W

Stapleton
- Location within Herefordshire
- Population: 110 (2011)
- OS grid reference: SO324657
- Unitary authority: Herefordshire
- Ceremonial county: Herefordshire
- Region: West Midlands
- Country: England
- Sovereign state: United Kingdom
- Post town: PRESTEIGNE
- Postcode district: LD8
- Dialling code: 01544
- Police: West Mercia
- Fire: Hereford and Worcester
- Ambulance: West Midlands
- UK Parliament: North Herefordshire

Stapleton is a small village and civil parish in Herefordshire, England, near the border town of Presteigne in Wales. The parish borders on Willey, Kinsham and Presteigne. Stapleton is surrounded by farmland. Bryan's Ground gardens are open to the public.

== History ==
In 1144, when the lord of Richard's Castle was expelled from Presteigne, he built the castle in Stapleton which remains today. It became the centre of his lordship in the Welsh Marches. During the Middle Ages, Stapleton was more important than Presteigne.

In 2006, an archaeological excavation in a field found ancient remains.

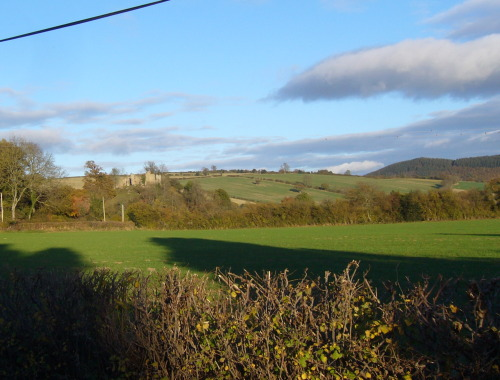
Stapleton Hill and Castle

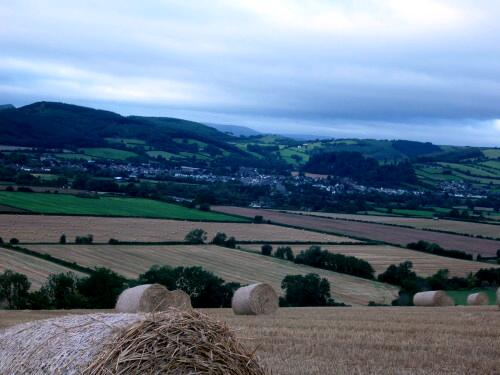
Presteigne viewed from Stapleton Hill (2007)

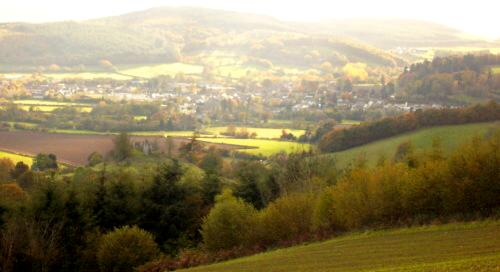
Stapleton and Presteigne viewed from Hell Peak
