= Lingen, Herefordshire =

Village in Herefordshire, England

Coordinates: 52.2980°N 2.9315°W

Lingen
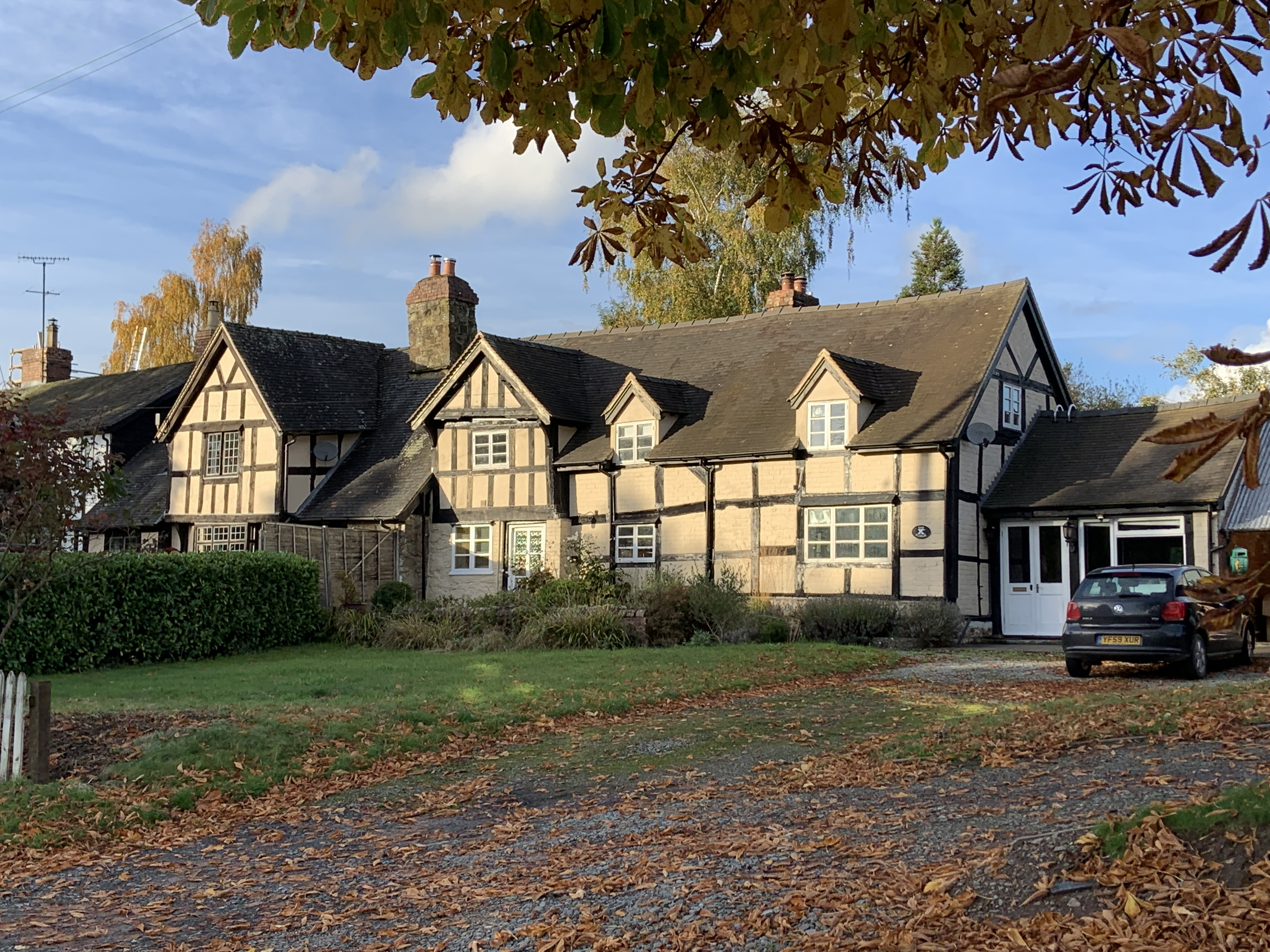
- The Forge

- Location within Herefordshire
- Population: 152 (2011)
- OS grid reference: SO365670
- Unitary authority: Herefordshire
- Ceremonial county: Herefordshire
- Region: West Midlands
- Country: England
- Sovereign state: United Kingdom
- Post town: BUCKNELL
- Postcode district: SY7
- Dialling code: 01544
- Police: West Mercia
- Fire: Hereford and Worcester
- Ambulance: West Midlands
- UK Parliament: North Herefordshire

Lingen /ˈlɪŋən/ is a village and civil parish, situated in the wooded hills of Herefordshire, England in the Welsh Marches, near to the border with Wales and close to the larger village of Wigmore. Situated in the north-west corner of the county, Lingen parish includes the hamlets of Deerfold, Limebrook, Birtley and Willey. It lies on the Limebrook which runs into the River Lugg south of the village. It lies at a height of between 145 and 283 metres above sea level.

The village today has a public house – the Royal George – and a sub-post office.

== History ==
=== Pre-history ===
The village lies at the southern edge of the ancient ice sheet and was sandwiched between two large post-glacial lakes; one centred on Presteigne, the other known to geologists as Wigmore Glacial Lake.

Geologically, the region is based entirely on Silurian beds, namely the marine Silurian and sizeable outcrops of Downtonian.

=== Early history ===
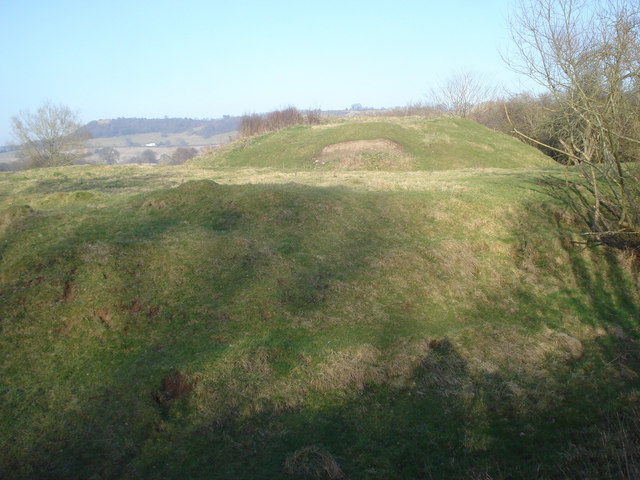
Lingen Castle motte

Occupied since at least the Middle Ages; there is evidence of medieval strip lynchets on a hillside near the village. It is mentioned in the Domesday Book of 1086. The village is close to the substantial Mortimer castle at Wigmore and there is evidence of an early motte and bailey castle in the village. It has not been excavated but the former presence of a stone keep has been suggested, as well as a 12th-century gate-house, with a curtain wall around the bailey.

The village website suggests a Celtic origin for the name of the village: place of sparkling water. Ling is Old English for heather and may be an alternative toponymological derivation. The Institute for Name Studies speculates that the name was originally that of a river.

The manorial lordship was held by the Lingen family until the 17th century.

=== Limebrook Priory ===
Located just south of the village centre a nunnery was founded before the reign of Richard I, either by Ralph de Lingen or one of the Mortimers. There is some confusion as to the order to which it belonged, but in the time of Bishop Booth, 1516–35, it was tenanted by Augustinian nuns and subsisted until the dissolution of the monasteries. Remains now consist of a single ruined building.

=== Victorian ===
In 1868 the village was described thus:

LINGEN, a parish in the hundred of Wigmore, county Hereford, 4 miles N.E. of Presteign, its post town, and 3 from Wigmore. It is a small village, situated on a branch of the river Lug, and on the road leading from Leintwardine to Presteign. Near the village are the ruins of a castle. The soil is various, but generally fertile. The living is a perpetual curacy in the diocese of Hereford, value £70, in the patronage of the bishop. The church, dedicated to St. Michael, has a small belfry containing one bell. The charities produce about £5 10s. per annum. There is a small day-school. John Edwards, Esq., is lord of the manor.

=== St Michael and All Angels Church ===
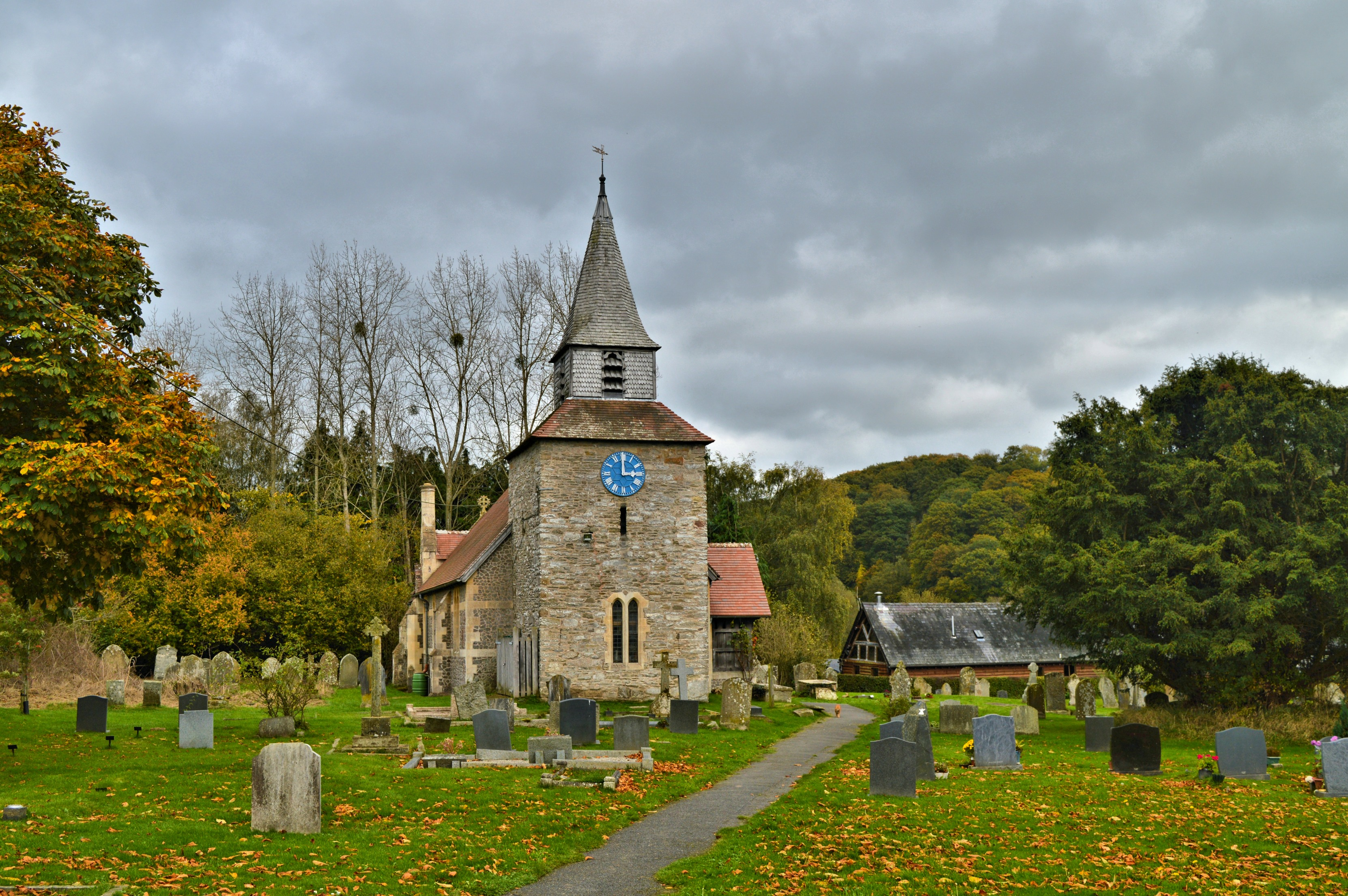
St Michael and All Angels Church

Built of stone, the church dates back to the 13th century when the original was built. The current building was substantially repaired in the 19th century and the bell tower turret has attractive wooden shingles. It was re-dedicated on 22 April 1891 by the Bishop of Hereford.

=== Methodist Chapel ===
The chapel opened on 26 June 1877 and remains open to this day.

== Population ==
As the censuses reveal, the village population has been remarkably stable. Presumably there was a charabanc trip on the night of the 1901 census but the population decline probably reflects the agrarian recession of the time when agricultural workers left the land for better paid jobs in the boom industries of the time – coal mining, quarrying and iron in Shropshire or further afield to South Wales.

Year	1801	1811	1821	1831	1841	1851	1861	1871	1881	1891	1901	1911	1921	1931	1941	1951	1961	1971	1981	1991	2001
Population		247	244	284	298	285	296	287	272	293	88	276	263	255							215
Population figures for Lingen, Herefordshire

== Famous associations ==
- Albert Lee (born 21 December 1943), one of the world's greatest guitarists, was born in Lingen.

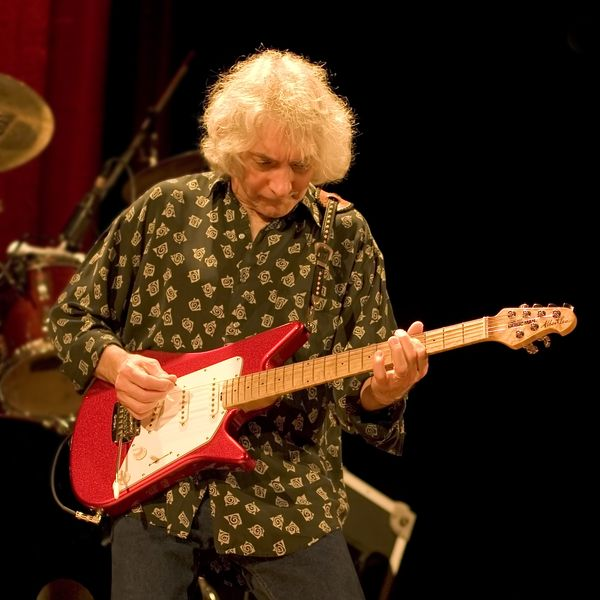
Albert Lee

- Ralph Lingen, 1st Baron Lingen, Permanent Secretary to the Treasury
- Sir Henry Lingen, Royalist Commander in the English Civil War
