= Upper Hergest =

Hamlet in Herefordshire, England

Coordinates: 52.188°N 3.079°W

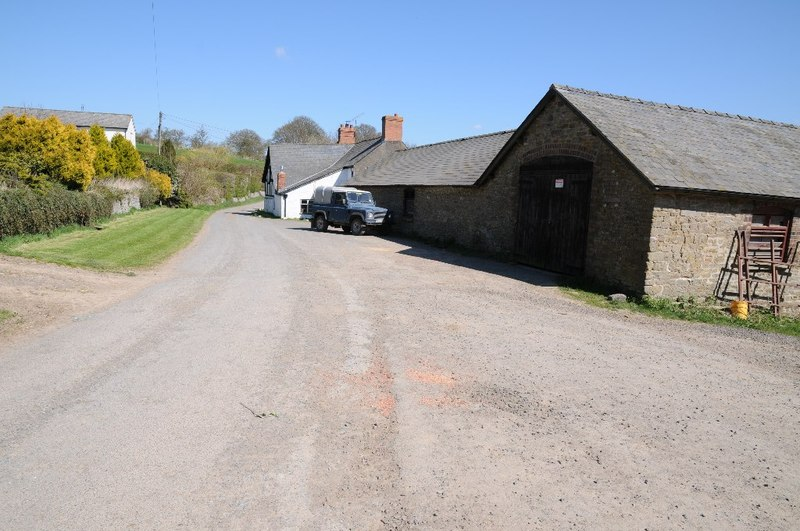
Upper Hergest

Upper Hergest is a hamlet located in the civil parish of Kington, in the county of Herefordshire, England. It is located approximately 2 miles west of the town of Kington and lies close to the border with Wales. The hamlet is situated on the southern slopes of Hergest Ridge, a prominent hill in the region.

Close to Upper Hergest is Hergest Court, a Grade II* listed former manor house dating from around 1430, reputedly linked to the Vaughan family. The area is also associated with the medieval Welsh manuscript, the Red Book of Hergest, which is thought to have been found at Hergest Court.

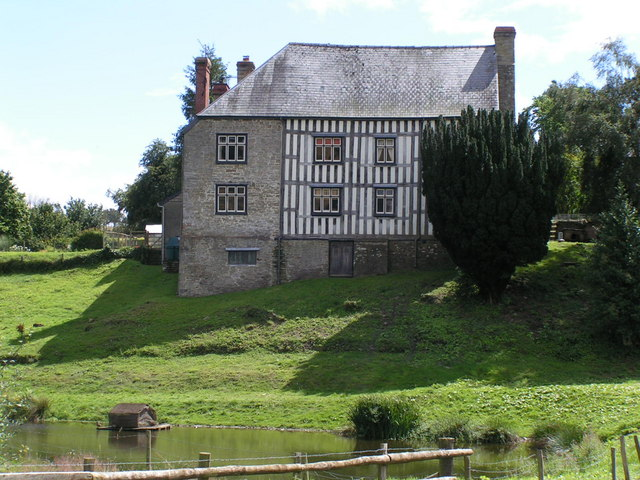
Hergest Court
