= John Walsham =

British diplomat (1830–1905)

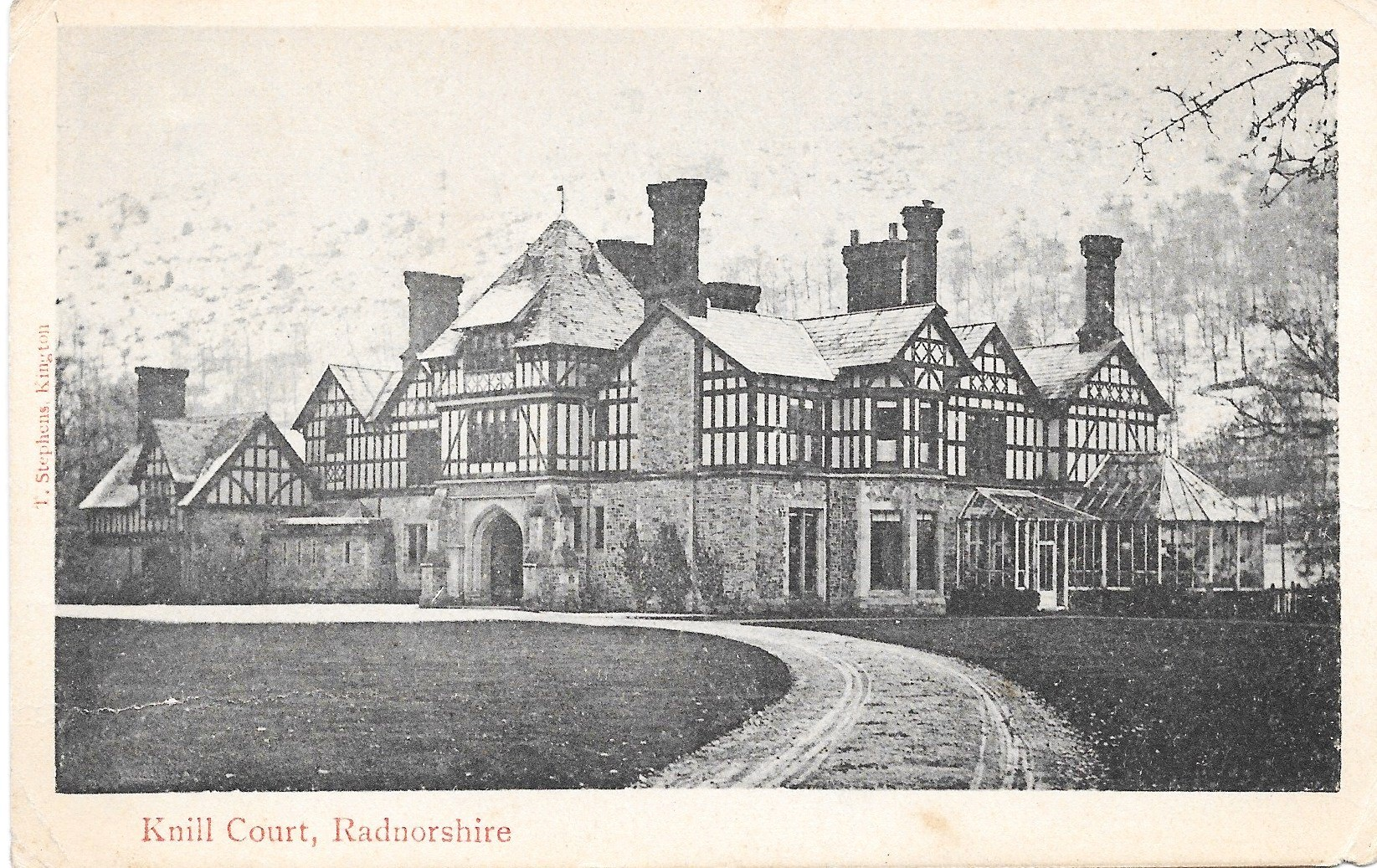
Knill Court, seat of the Walsham baronets

Sir John Walsham, 2nd Baronet KCMG (29 October 1830 – 10 December 1905) was a British diplomat who was envoy to China and Romania. He was given the rank of Minister Plenipotentiary in Paris.

== Career ==
Walsham was the eldest son of Sir John James Walsham, 1st Baronet. He was educated at Bury St Edmunds Grammar School and Trinity College, Cambridge. He joined the Audit Office in March 1854 but transferred to the Foreign Office that October. He served in Mexico 1857–65, including acting as chargé d'affaires 1863–65.

He served in Madrid 1866–70 at a time when the Spanish forts on the Strait of Gibraltar would fire on passing merchant ships if they failed to display their national flags.

Walsham was a commissioner dealing with the arbitration of claims under an agreement of 1865, such as that of the schooner Mermaid, of Dartmouth, alleged to have been sunk by the fort at Ceuta. In 1870 Walsham moved to The Hague, and in 1873 he was nominated as secretary of legation at Peking but did not go there; instead he withdrew from the service because of the illness of his father, who died on 10 August 1874.

Walsham, having succeeded to the baronetcy, rejoined the service in January 1875 and was posted back to Madrid, then in 1878 to Berlin, and in 1883 to Paris where he was given the rank of Minister Plenipotentiary in the absence of the Ambassador.

In 1885 he was appointed Envoy Extraordinary and Minister Plenipotentiary to the Emperor of China and the King of Korea. After seven years his health deteriorated due to the heavy work and the climate, and he returned to Europe and was envoy to Romania 1892–94. He retired in 1894 and was knighted KCMG in February 1895.

Diplomatic posts
Preceded by Sir Nicholas O'Conor (chargé d'affaires)	Envoy Extraordinary and Minister Plenipotentiary to the Emperor of China, and also Her Majesty's Envoy Extraordinary and Minister Plenipotentiary to the King of Corea; 1885–1892	Succeeded by Sir Nicholas O'Conor
Preceded by Sir Frank Lascelles	Envoy Extraordinary and Minister Plenipotentiary to His Majesty the King of Roumania; 1892–1894	Succeeded by Sir Hugh Wyndham
Baronetage of the United Kingdom
Preceded by Sir John James Walsham	Baronet (of Knill Court); 1874–1905	Succeeded by Sir John Scarlett Walsham
