= Wapley Hill =

Hillfort in Herefordshire, England

Coordinates: 52°15′25″N 2°57′36″W

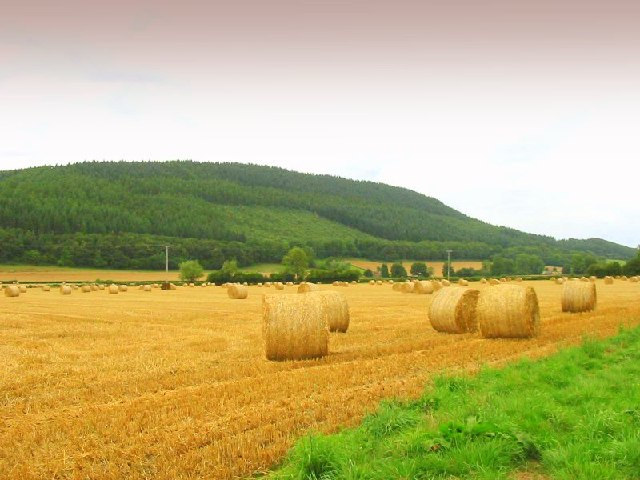
Looking south to Wapley Hill.

Wapley Hill is an Iron Age hill fort in Herefordshire, England, 3 km south-east of Presteigne.

== Location ==
Wapley Hill stands in mixed woodland on a west-facing escarpment to the south of the B4362 road from Presteigne to Mortimer's Cross.

The Herefordshire Trail way-marked long distance footpath passes through the site.

== Description ==
The defences stand at a height of 5.6 m and occupy 6 hectares. The entrance is situated on the southern side and comprises a 90 m passage.

A 'ritual shaft' dating from the late Bronze Age is sunk to a depth of 33 m.
