= Herefordshire Trail =

154-mile footpath in Herefordshire, England

Coordinates: 51.9144°N 2.5865°W

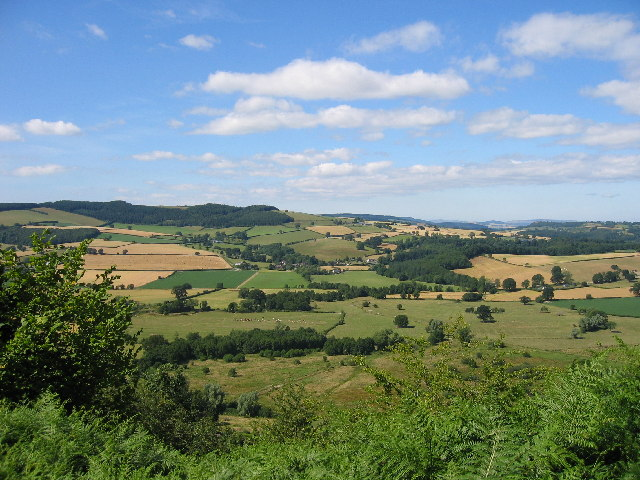
- Herefordshire Trail leading to Wapley Hillfort
- Length: 154 mi (248 km)
- Location: Herefordshire, England
- Designation: Long-distance trail
- Trailheads: Ledbury, Herefordshire; Ledbury, Herefordshire
- Use: Hiking
- Highest point: Harley's Mountain, 376 m (1,234 ft)
- Difficulty: Easy
- Season: All year

The Herefordshire Trail is a long distance footpath in Herefordshire, England.

== Route and distance ==
The trail, running for 154 miles (248 km) as a circular tour of Herefordshire, links the five market towns of Leominster, Bromyard, Ledbury, Ross-on-Wye and Kington, and includes some of the smallest villages of the area, such as Kilpeck or Leintwardine.

The route encompasses historic churches and inns. The terrain varies from panoramic views – at Harley's Mountain (376m, the highest point), Garway Hill Common (366m), Merbach Hill (318m), and Golden Valley below the Welsh Black Mountains – and river valleys, including the Black and white villages trail passing through cider orchards and lesser-known places.

Landmarks on the route include Wilton Castle at Ross-on-Wye, the wooden toll bridge at Whitney-on-Wye, the 1895 Louis Harper pedestrian suspension bridge at Sellack Boat, Arthur's Stone tomb near Dorstone, sculpted hedges at Brampton Bryan, and the short Kingfisher Line railway near Titley.

== Connecting trails ==
The Herefordshire Trail links with the Birmingham and Aberystwyth Walk, Black and White Village Trail, Clun Valley Walk, Elan Valley Way, Geopark Way, Leadon Valley Walks, Marches Way, Monnow Valley Walk, Mortimer Trail, Offa's Dyke Path National Trail, Ross Round, Teme Valley Walk, Teme Valley Way, Upper Lugg Valley Walk, Vaughan's Way and the Wye Valley Walk.
