= Brilley =

Village in Herefordshire, England

Coordinates: 52.136°N 3.081°W

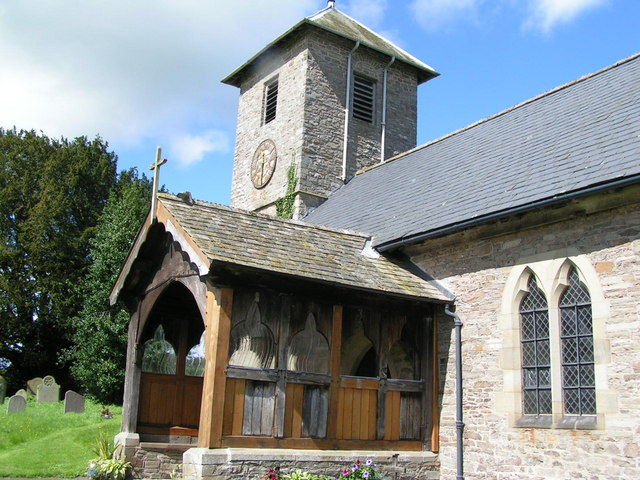
- St Mary's, Brilley

- Location within Herefordshire
- OS grid reference: SO260492
- Unitary authority: Herefordshire
- Shire county: Herefordshire
- Region: West Midlands
- Country: England
- Sovereign state: United Kingdom
- Post town: Hereford
- Postcode district: HR3 and HR5
- Dialling code: 01497
- Police: West Mercia
- Fire: Hereford and Worcester
- Ambulance: West Midlands
- UK Parliament: North Herefordshire

Brilley is a small village and civil parish in Herefordshire, England, close to the border with Wales, and about 8 km (5 mi) north-east of the Welsh border town of Hay-on-Wye.

== Toponymy ==
Brilley derives from Brynlegh, Brunleg or Brunlege in Old English, meaning "burnt clearing".

== History ==
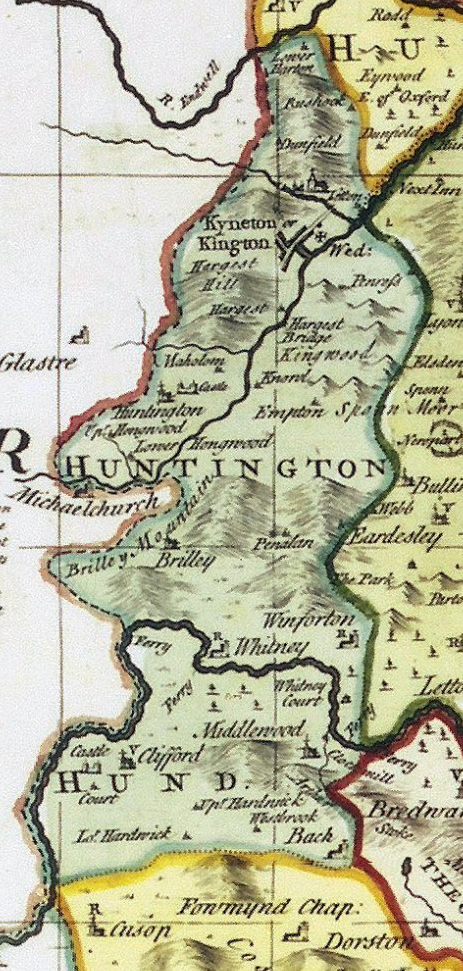
Hundred of Huntington

Brilley is not mentioned in the Domesday Book. St Mary's chapelry was established in the 12th century. The site was rebuilt in the 13th century and later underwent restorations.

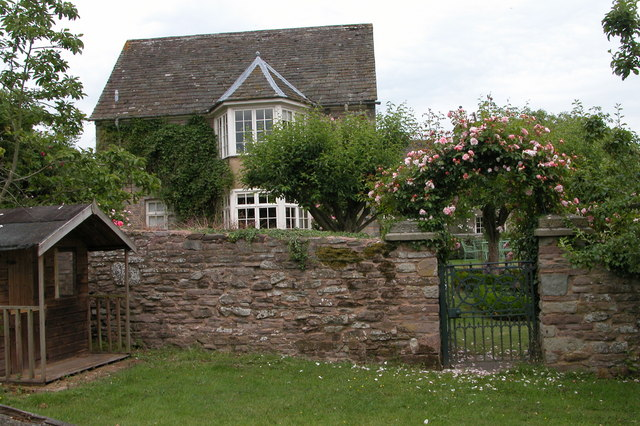
Brilley Court Farmhouse

Population records for the parish of Brilley date back to the Poll Tax of 1379. Historians believe Fernhall Farm was founded around this time. Little Penlan and Cwmmau Farmhouse came about in the 16th and 17th centuries respectively. The various farms and houses of Brilley contain a mixture of medieval and early modern features.

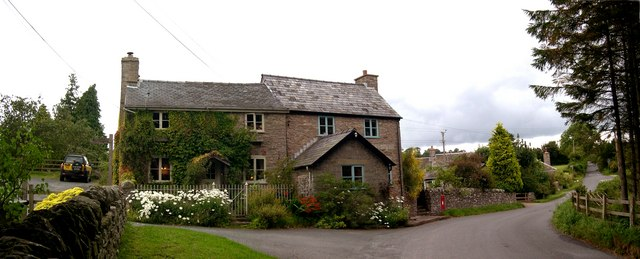
The Old School (2008)

In 1968, a new primary school was built next door to the village hall; the school was closed in 2007 because of low pupil numbers, and later demolished in 2014 to expand the carpark for the village hall.
