= Lower Hergest =

Hamlet in Herefordshire, England

Coordinates: 52.192°N 3.060°W

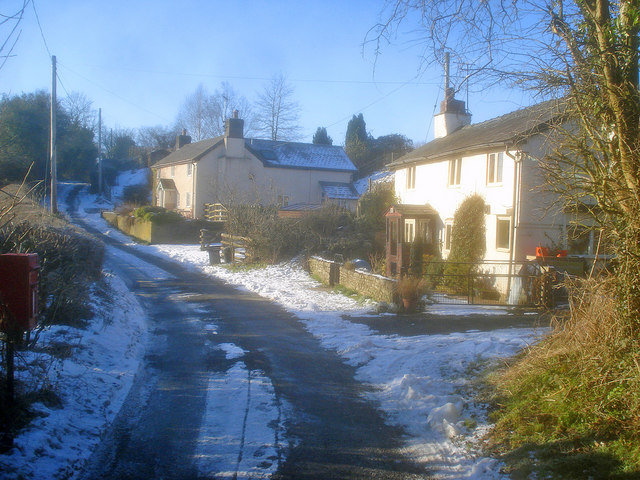
Lower Hergest View south-west along Upper Hergest Road with just a small cluster of houses making up this community.

Lower Hergest is a hamlet in Herefordshire, England.

The local manor house, Hergest Court, is a Grade II* listed building built of a mixture of stone and timber frame with a moat. It dates back to c. 1430 and was built for Thomas Vaughan, son of Sir Roger Vaughan. It was the birthplace of Margaret Vaughan, wife of Sir John Hawkins.
