= Hergest Ridge =

Hill in Britain

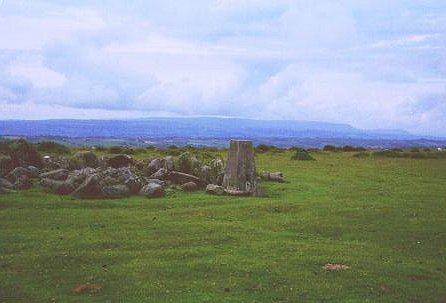
- The summit

Highest point
- Elevation: 426 m (1,398 ft)
- Prominence: 158 m (518 ft)
- Parent peak: Gwaunceste Hill
- Listing: Marilyn
- Coordinates: 52°11′56″N 3°05′34″W

Geography
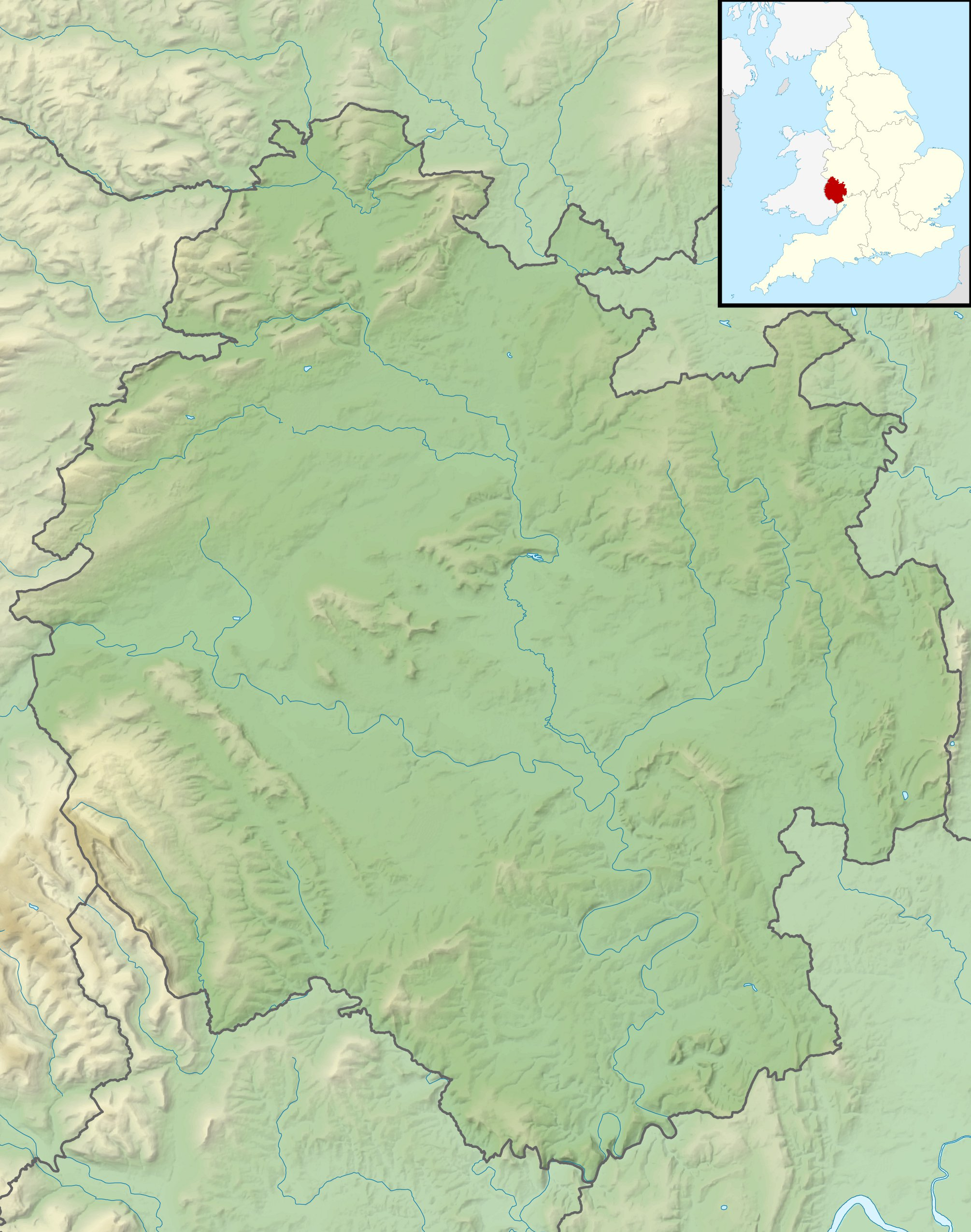
- Location within Herefordshire
- Location: Herefordshire / Powys, UK
- OS grid: SO254562
- Topo map: OS Landranger 148

Climbing
- Easiest route: Hiking

Hergest Ridge is a large elongated hill which traverses the border between England and Wales in the United Kingdom, between the town of Kington in Herefordshire and the village of Gladestry in Powys. Its highest point, which is in England, is 426 metres (1,398 ft) high. It has a topographic prominence of 157.6 metres (517 ft) and thus is listed as a Marilyn.

"Hergest" is pronounced to rhyme with 'hardest' with a hard "g" (as in "garden").

== Description ==
The Offa's Dyke Path waymarked long distance footpath leads along the ridge, and provides good access to the summit from the road end beyond Hergest Croft Gardens, to the east. The path passes close by the highest point of the ridge and the adjacent trig point. During the Second World War the hill was cultivated, but has now reverted to rough sheep grazing and moorland, and is partly covered by bracken and gorse.

=== Monkey-puzzle trees ===
A group of eight Araucaria araucana or Monkey Puzzle trees were planted in April 1988 by Phil Wright (gardener) on behalf of Richard (Dick) Banks of Hergest Croft, who had seen similar trees growing in the high Andes while travelling in Argentina and Chile. They are not at the summit but form a notable landmark.

=== Victorian racecourse ===
A disused Victorian circular country racecourse is sited on the hill. It is clearly marked on Ordnance Survey maps and is still visible on the ground. The racecourse was popular between 1825 and 1846. It replaced an earlier racecourse on nearby Bradnor Hill just to the north of Kington town, which dates from 1770. Horse races continued here in the summer until around 1880. With the panoramic views on all sides, they were popular with the local gentry, squirearchy and farming community.

=== Summit features ===
There is a trig point 230m west of the summit, and the summit itself is marked by a group of boulders.

== Archaeology ==
A 2007 archaeological survey of Hergest Ridge Common found evidence of many features ranging from prehistoric cairns to second world war training installations.

== Inspiration ==
The ridge inspired an album by English multi-instrumentalist Mike Oldfield, Hergest Ridge. Oldfield was a resident of the area during the writing and recording of his albums Hergest Ridge and Ommadawn. Ommadawn was actually recorded in his nearby house, The Beacon. The albums were reissued with bonus material in June 2010.

At the end of Ommadawn is a short song entitled On Horseback. The last lines of the lyrics are as follows: So if you feel a little glum, to Hergest Ridge you should come. In summer, winter, rain or sun, it's good to be on horseback.
