= Kinsham =

Civil parish in Herefordshire, England

Coordinates: 52.2729°N 2.9411°W

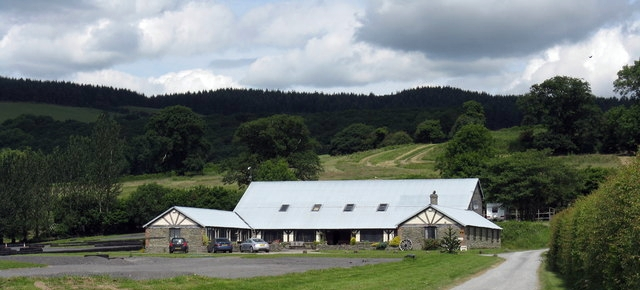
- A kart racing track near Kinsham, with Cole's Hill behind

- Location within Herefordshire
- Population: 71
- OS grid reference: SO358642
- Unitary authority: Herefordshire
- Ceremonial county: Herefordshire
- Region: West Midlands
- Country: England
- Sovereign state: United Kingdom
- Post town: PRESTEIGNE
- Postcode district: LD8
- Dialling code: 01544
- Police: West Mercia
- Fire: Hereford and Worcester
- Ambulance: West Midlands
- UK Parliament: North Herefordshire

Kinsham is a civil parish which lies in the wooded hills of Herefordshire, England in the Marches near to the border with Wales, about 3 miles (5 km) east of the Welsh town of Presteigne. The parish has two small settlements, Upper Kinsham and Lower Kinsham, in the east overlooking the valley of the River Lugg, which marks the parish boundary.

The 2001 census records that 71 people lived in the parish of Kinsham, of whom 32 were male and 39 female.

== History ==
There is evidence of human occupation as far back as the Bronze Age at a round barrow (SO34006400)

On either 2nd or 3 February 1461 the Battle of Mortimer's Cross was fought downstream from Kinsham. In the aftermath of the battle Lancastrian soldiers retreated up the river Lugg and were trapped where the river gorge narrows at Kinsham. Local folklore states the river ran red with the blood of the soldiers when they were killed.

In 1868 the village was described thus:

UPPER KINSHAM, a parish in the hundred of Wigmore, county Hereford, 3 miles N.E. of Presteigne, its post town, 7 from Kington, and 12 from Leominster. It is situated on the river Lug, and on the turnpike road from Leintwardine to Presteigne. The land is partly in hops. The soil is very inferior in quality. The living is a donative curacy in the diocese of Hereford, value £15. The church is a modern structure with a belfry. The chancel contains escutcheons of the Oxford and Mortimer families. Kinsham Court is partly in ruins. Kinsham Dingle is a favourite resort for pleasure seekers on account of its scenery. LOWER KINSHAM, a township in the parish of Presteigne, county Hereford, 2 miles E. of Presteigne. It is a small agricultural place.

The National Gazetteer of Great Britain and Ireland

== Kinsham Court ==
The mansion of Kinsham Court is near the village. Lord Byron lived here 1812–13 and here wrote the first two cantos of Childe Harold. Florence Nightingale spent part of her childhood at the house. Edwardian owner, Sir John Stanhope Arkwright (of the famous textiles family), wrote the hymn O Valiant Hearts.
The mansion lies in a landscape park.

== Church ==
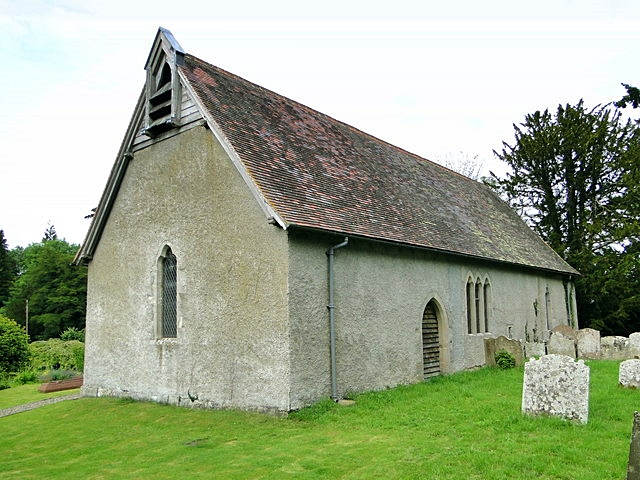
All Saints church

The village church is next to Kinsham Court and is still regularly used. It is of 14th-century origin with evidence of 18th-century woodwork. It is an Anglican church dedicated to All Saints and is a Grade II* listed building.

The parish is now part of the benefice of Presteigne with Discoed, Kinsham, Lingen & Knill, with the Priest resident in Presteigne.

== Recreation ==
The Herefordshire Trail long distance footpath crosses the River Lugg in the village and then climbs Cole's Hill. There is a Kart racing track just west of the village, where the Moto3 team MLav Racing is based.

== Notable residents ==
- Chaz Davies, MotoGP rider.
