= Combe, Herefordshire =

Village and civil parish in England

Coordinates: 52.266°N 2.961°W

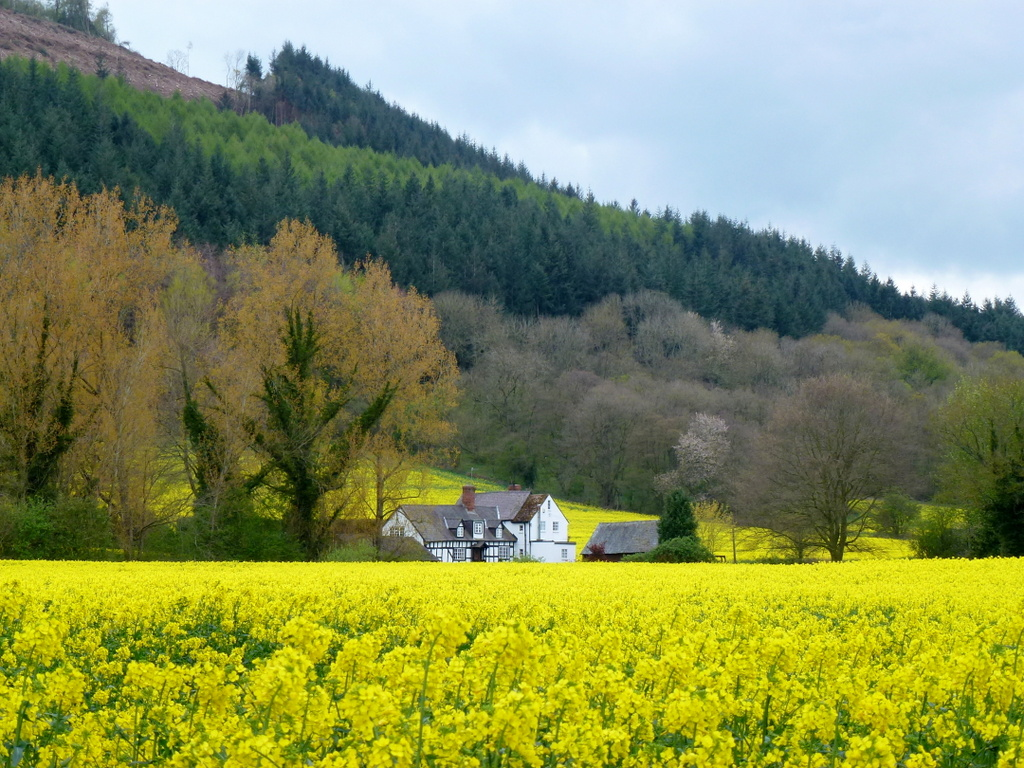
Combe Farm at the foot of Wapley Hill

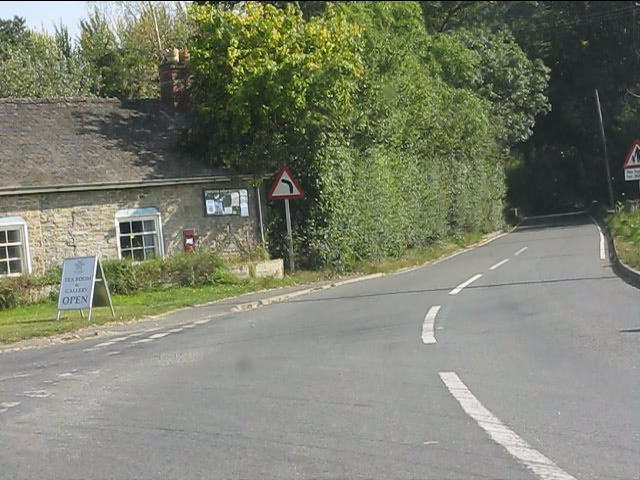
B4362 at Combe

Combe is a small village and civil parish in the English county of Herefordshire on the border with Wales. The village lies 4 km (2 mi) east of Presteigne near the confluence of the Hindwell Brook and the River Lugg.
