= Byton, Herefordshire =

Village and civil parish in Herefordshire, England

Coordinates: 52°16′N 2°55′W

Byton is a village and civil parish in Herefordshire, England. Byton is situated on the River Lugg, near the border with Wales. According to the 2001 census, it had a population of 93, increasing to 184 at the 2011 census.

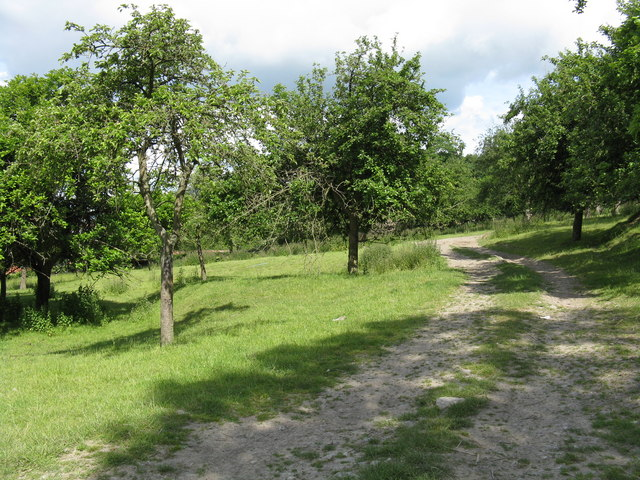
Byton church field
