= Knill =

Village and civil parish in Herefordshire, England

Coordinates: 52.238°N 3.039°W

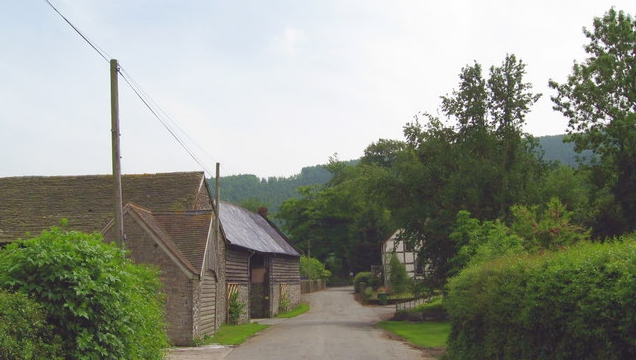
Knill

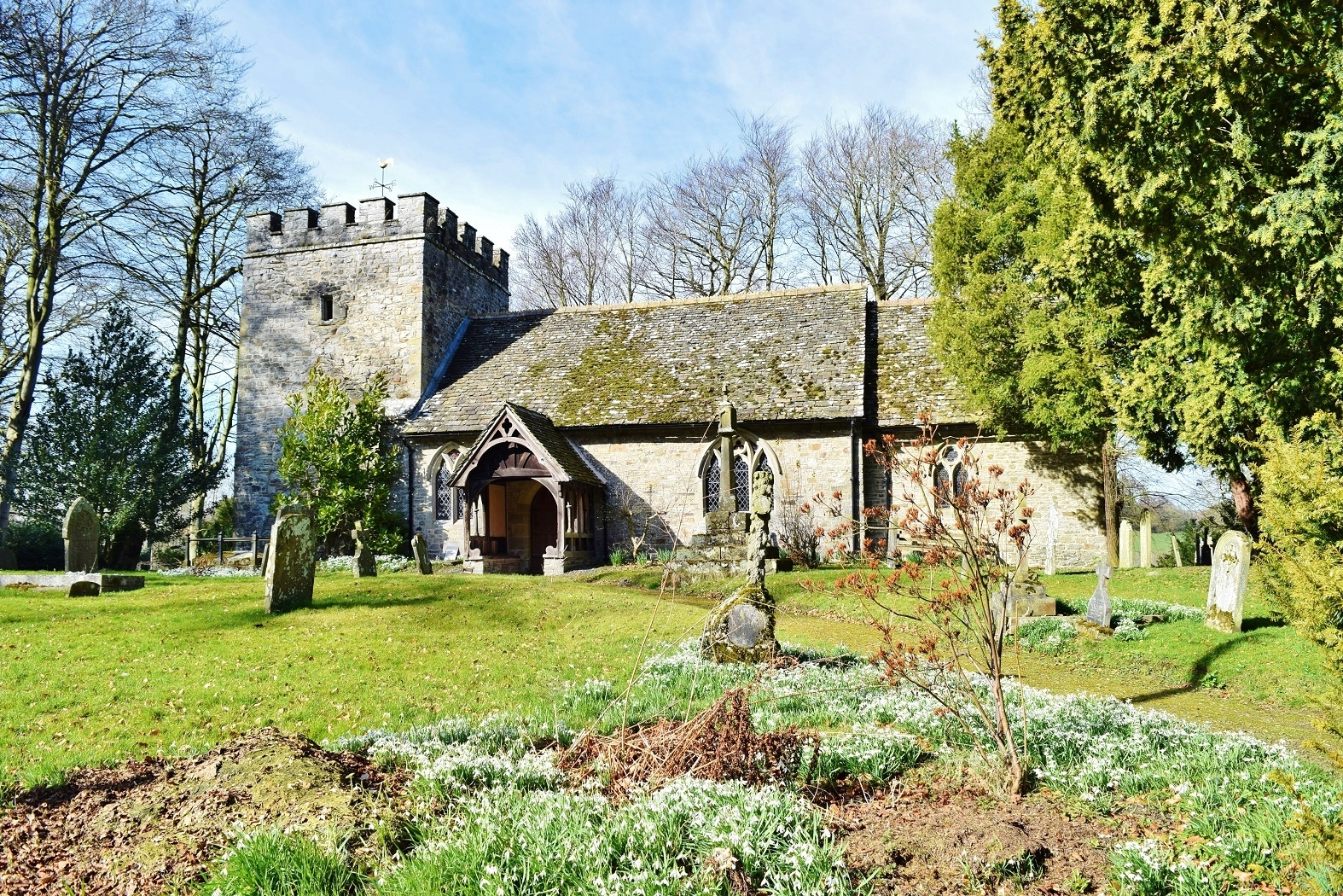
St Michael's Church

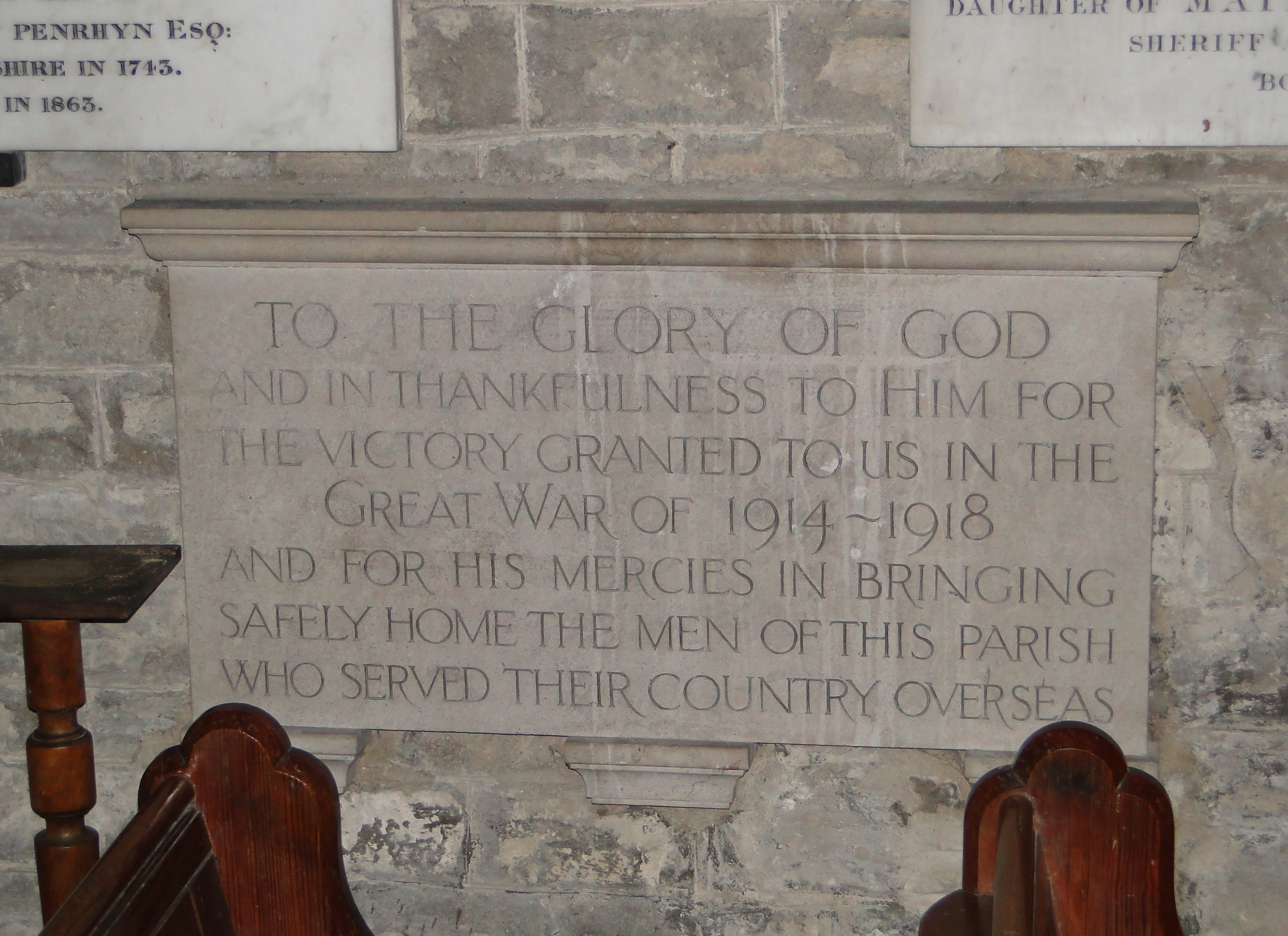
Great War plaque

Knill is a village and civil parish in Herefordshire, England.

== History ==
Recorded in the Domesday Book of 1086 as Chenille (from the Old English meaning 'Place by the hillock'), the small village of Knill is just inside the Herefordshire border with Wales, 4.5 km (2.8 mi) south west of Presteigne and set within "The Marches" as these borderlands are known. The ancient boundary between Mercia and the Welsh, Offa's Dyke, runs along the ridge above the village with the modern border running along the 'Hidden Valley' floor.

The population of the village in the 1861 census was 84 but has declined to figures in the 20s.

The parish church of St Michael dates from the 12th century and is a Grade II* listed building. Inside are the funerary hatchments of the Walsham family, who formerly lived at Knill Court, a large country house that was destroyed by a fire in 1943.

Knill is one of two Thankful Villages in Herefordshire – those rare places that suffered no fatalities during the Great War of 1914 to 1918. The village is featured on Darren Hayman's album, Thankful Villages Volume 3.

There is thus no war memorial in the village but in the parish church there is a carved stone plaque on the wall, with the inscription:

TO THE GLORY OF GOD
AND IN THANKSGIVING TO HIM FOR
THE VICTORY GRANTED TO US IN THE
GREAT WAR OF 1914–1918
AND FOR HIS MERCIES IN BRINGING
SAFELY HOME THE MEN OF THIS PARISH
WHO SERVED THEIR COUNTRY OVERSEAS
