= Dinmore =

Dinmore may refer to:

== Places ==
=== Australia ===
- Dinmore, Queensland

=== United Kingdom ===
- Dinmore, Herefordshire
- Dinmore Hill, Herefordshire
- Dinmore Manor, Herefordshire
- Dinmore Tunnel, Herefordshire
- Hope under Dinmore, Herefordshire
