= Sutton, Herefordshire =

Civil parish in Herefordshire, England

Coordinates: 52.107°N 2.686°W

Sutton
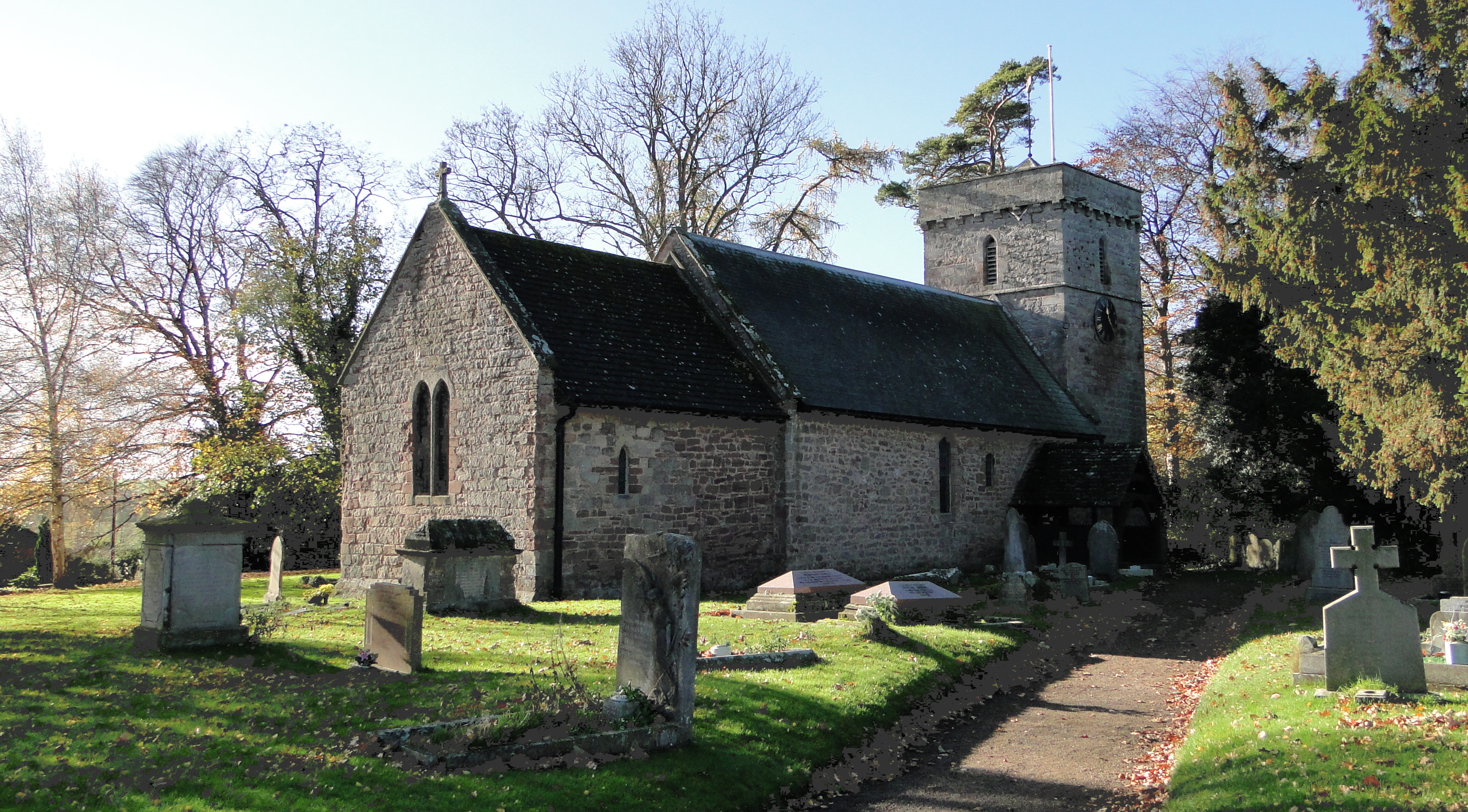
- St Nicholas' church, Sutton

- Location within Herefordshire
- Population: 925
- OS grid reference: SO531456
  - London: 115 mi (185 km) SE
- Civil parish: Sutton
- Shire county: Herefordshire
- Region: West Midlands
- Country: England
- Sovereign state: United Kingdom
- Post town: Hereford
- Postcode district: HR1
- Dialling code: 01432
- Police: West Mercia
- Fire: Hereford and Worcester
- Ambulance: West Midlands
- UK Parliament: North Herefordshire

Sutton is a civil parish in Herefordshire, England, about 3 miles (5 km) north-east from the county town and city of Hereford. The major settlement is the village of Sutton St Nicholas which is conjoined with Sutton St Michael, formerly the village of a separate parish. The parish is sometimes referred to as Sutton St Nicholas. Within the parish is Sutton Walls, the supposed site of the palace of the kings of Mercia.

== History ==
Sutton derives from the Old English 'sūth' with 'tūn', meaning 'south farmstead or village'. In the Domesday Book, the manor is listed as Sutune, and in 1242 as Suttune.

In 1086, following the Norman Conquest, Sutton was in the Hundred of Tornelaus and county of Herefordshire, with 22 households, and two lands of Nigel the doctor (a clerk, probably one of William I's physicians), and one of Hugh de L'Asne (Hugh the ass), both being lords in Sutton, and Tenants-in-chief to king William. Lordship had been transferred from the 1066 owners Leoffled (the wife of Thorkil), and Spirtes the priest. Spirites was the sub-tenant predecessor of the lands of Nigel the doctor, but was exiled for undetermined crimes as the Conquest began. Nigel's first land at Sutton comprised a mill, four smallholders and two cottagers—those who owned about five acres of land—and a further three people, one a Frenchman, in an area of land (ploughlands) defined by what could be ploughed by Nigel's one plough team and his two men's plough teams. His second land comprised one smallholder, four slaves and mill within two ploughlands with two lord's plough teams. Hugh's land included one villager, six smallholders, a Frenchman, and four men's plough teams. A 'Frenchman' was a non-noble freeholder who had settled from abroad, but not necessarily from France.

=== 19th century ===
In 1842 The parliamentary gazetteer of England and Wales reported that Sutton St Michael contained a "daily school... [with] a house and garden", 15 houses, and hop cultivation of 89 acres (36 ha) within a parish of 780 acres (316 ha). In 1801 population was 112; in 1831, 98. Sutton St Nicholas contained 54 houses, and had a population of 168 in 1801, and 234 in 1831, in a parish area of 720 acres (291 ha).

Until the 19th century, today's Sutton comprised two parishes: Sutton St Michael and Sutton St Nicholas. They were both in the Boxash hundred, and the Weston Deanery and Hereford archdeaconry of the Diocese of Hereford. The parishes were part of the Hereford Union—poor relief and joint parish workhouse provision set up under the Poor Law Amendment Act 1834. It was described as being 1.5 miles (2 km) east from the Hereford to Bromyard turnpike road. Sutton St Michael's population in 1851 was 98 in an area of 708 acres (287 ha), and that of Sutton St Nicholas 230, in 692 acres (280 ha). The soil of both parishes was of loam and gravel, on which were grown wheat beans, hops and apples. Mail for both parishes was processed through Hereford, where was also the nearest money order office, and from where the mail arrived by foot.

St Michael's Church, "a small stone building", comprised a nave, a chancel, and a "small turret" with two bells. The ecclesiastical parish living was a perpetual curacy. St Nicholas' Church, with a "substantial tower containing four bells", comprised a north porch, a chancel a nave, and a south transept which was commonly called the Lady (or Ladye) Chapel and in which was the font. The living was a rectory, with a residence and 23 acres (9 ha) of glebe, an area of land used to support the parish church and priest. The parish tithes—typically one-tenth of the produce or profits of the land given to the rector for his services— were commuted in 1841 under the 1836 Tithe Commutation Act, and substituted with a £200 yearly rent-charge payment. In Sutton St Nicholas was an Independent chapel and a mixed school.

The extant earthwork remains of a supposed Roman camp called 'Sutton Walls' was described as "very perfect", of oval form, with a single ditch, a rampart 40 feet (12 m) high, four entrances, and an area of 27 acres (11 ha). Although no walls remain, Giraldus Cambrensis (Gerald of Wales, 1146–1243), recorded seeing ruins of a castle, and the antiquary John Leland (1503–1552), the remains of "some ancient and great building". According to directories Sutton Walls was supposed the later site of the palace of the kings of Mercia, particularly king Offa, who married Quindreda, daughter to Charles the Great of France. Their daughter, Elfrida, was sought in marriage by king Ethelbert of the East Angles who, when visiting the palace, was murdered by Quindreda in the year 793. Ethelbert was buried at Marden, and later removed to Hereford Cathedral, where he was canonized and became its patron saint . Sutton Walls remained the residence of the Mercian kings until the overlordship of Egbert, who in 827 consolidated the Heptarchy of the Anglo-Saxon kingdoms.

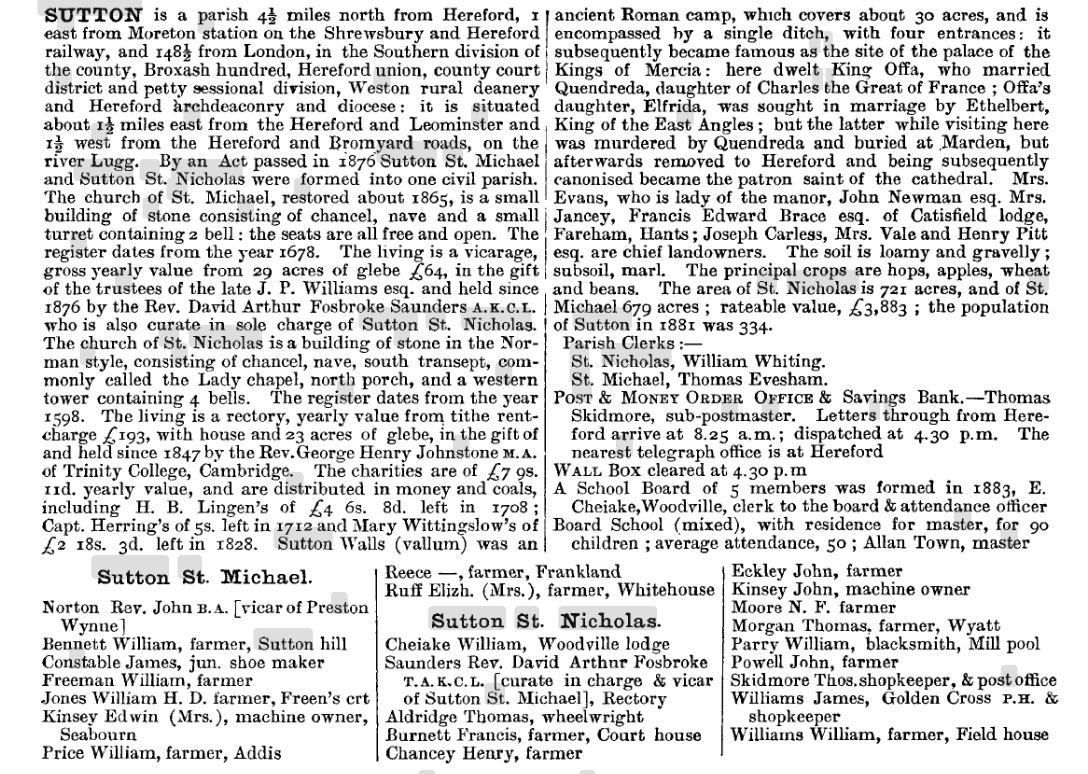
Sutton in Kelly's Directory of Herefordshire, 1885, p.12345

Residents, trades and occupations in the 1850s were, at Sutton St Michael: seven farmers, one of whom was a "steam thrashing machine proprietor" at Busy Hill, and a wheelwright who was also a carpenter, and a shoemaker. At Sutton St Nicholas were the rector, the priest of the Independent chapel, the schoolmistress, four farmers, a blacksmith, a carpenter, and the licensee of the Golden Cross Inn who was also a shopkeeper. The parish was served by the Shrewsbury and Hereford joint railway at the railway station in Moreton on Lugg, one mile to the west.

Under a provisional order of 21 April 1875, St Michael and St Nicholas were combined as the new civil parish of Sutton. On 25 March 1884 parts of the civil parishes of Felton, Ullingswick, Marden and Preston Wynne were amalgamated with Sutton, as were parts of Amberley township and Ocle Pychard on 25 March 1887. By the 1880s the new parish of Sutton, under the Divided Parishes Act passed in 1876, was in the southern division of Herefordshire. St Michael's church had been restored in 1865 (some sources state 1867) with "the seats... all free and open", and was now a vicarage, with a glebe increased to 29 acres (12 ha). St Michael's vicar was also the curate for the "Norman style" St Nicholas' church . Recorded were registers at St Michael dating to 1678, and St Nicholas to 1598. Three charities, dating from 1708, 1712 and 1828, provided £7 9s. 11p. yearly, "distributed in money and coals". A Congregational chapel was built in 1873 which sat 100 people. Parish population in 1881 was 334 in 67 inhabited houses in an area of 679 acres (275 ha) at St Michaels with 771 acres (312 ha) at St Nicholas. In 1871 population in the two parishes had been 391. For 1880's directory purpose St Michael lists six farmers, a shoemaker, and a machine owner; St Nicholas lists seven farmers, a wheelwright, a machine owner, a blacksmith at Mill pool, the licensee of the Golden Cross Inn who was also a shopkeeper, and a shopkeeper who also ran the parish post office.

The parish' mixed board school had been built in 1874, and was enlarged in 1891. A school board of five members has been established in 1883. The school accommodated 78 children with an average attendance of 52 in 1890, and 100 with 73 attendees in 1895, and had an attached schoolmaster's house. There was a Congregationalist chapel. The parish post office was also a money order and savings bank, and was granting Inland Revenue licenses. The nearest telegraph offices were at Moreton and Withington railway stations. Population in 1891 was 379. Residents and occupations listed in 1890 included the vicar of St Michael's who was also curate of St Nicholas', the vicar of Preston Wynne, the parish school master of the National School, two parish clerks, the licensee of the Golden Cross Inn who was also a shopkeeper, the sub-postmaster who was also a shopkeeper, a beer retailer & shopkeeper, a wheelwright, a blacksmith, two carpenters, two gardeners, and a coachman. There were twenty-one farmers, three of whom were also hop growers, nine were cottage farmers, and one the proprietor of a farming company which also provided threshing machines.

By 1911 parish population was 394, including the village of St Michael with 82, and St Nicholas, 268. The school was now a Public Elementary School of infants and juniors, which was enlarged in 1891 for 111 pupils and had an average attendance of 99. Joining the schoolmaster was an infants' mistress. Listed residents and occupations included twenty-two farmers, two of whom were also fruit growers, one a hop grower, and one a poultry farmer. There still existed the licensee of the Golden Cross public house, a cider merchant, a threshing machine proprietor, a wheelwright, a blacksmith, a beer retailer, and a shopkeeper who also ran the post office.

== Governance ==
The parish is represented in the lowest tier of UK governance by six elected members of Sutton Parish Council. As Herefordshire is a unitary authority—no district council between parish and county councils—the parish is represented in the Sutton Walls ward, which also includes Marden and Moreton on Lugg parishes with a 2019 combined estimated population of 3,652, to Herefordshire County Council. Sutton is represented in the UK parliament as part of the North Herefordshire constituency.

From 1837 until 1974 Sutton was part of Herefordshire. In 1974 it became part of the now defunct Hereford district of the county of Hereford and Worcester, instituted under the Local Government Act 1972, reverting to Herefordshire in 1998. In 2002 the parish, with the parishes of Marden and Moreton on Lugg, was reassessed as part of Sutton Walls Ward which elected one councillor to Herefordshire district council.

== Geography ==
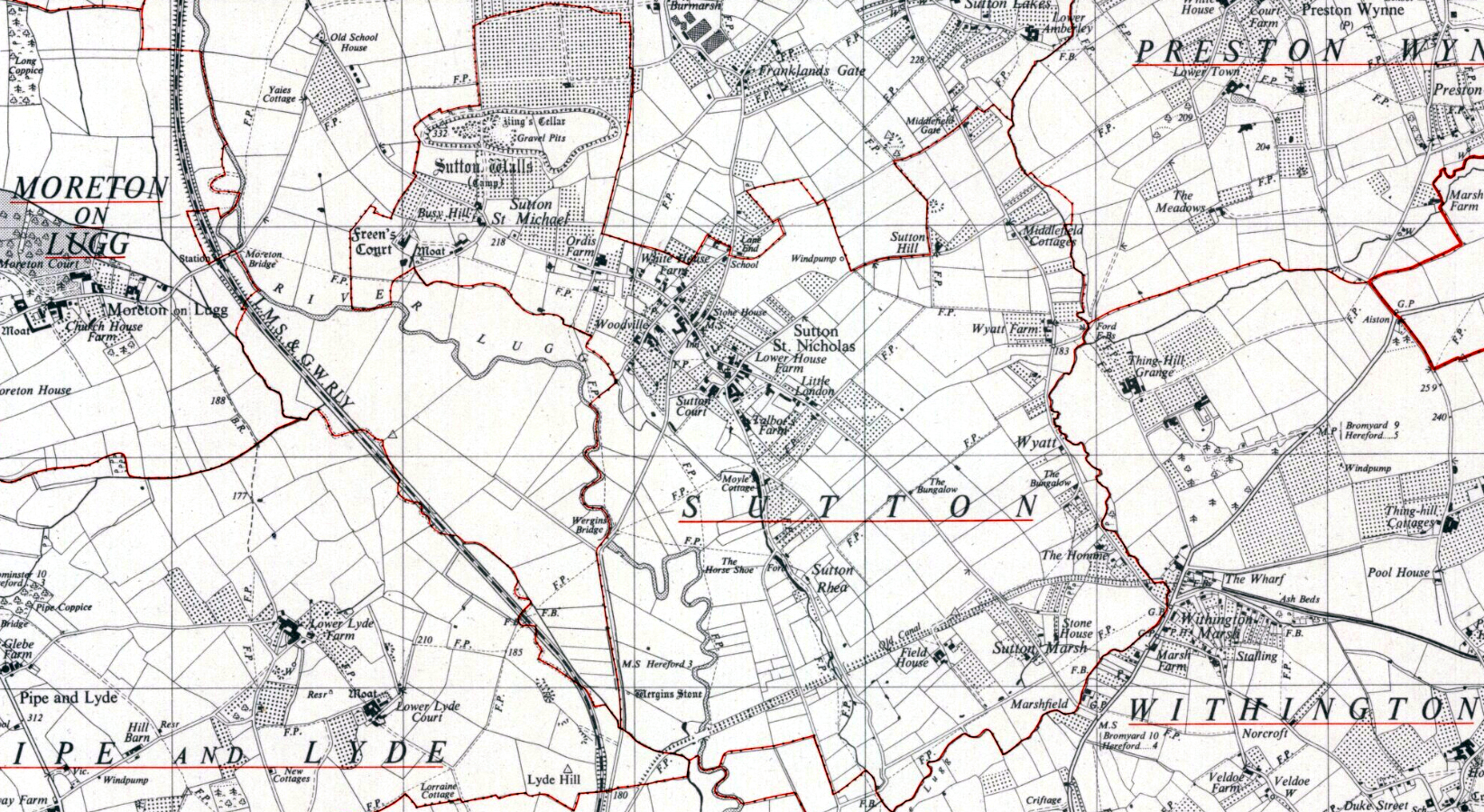
1950 OS map of Sutton

Sutton, a civil parish at the centre of Herefordshire, is entirely rural, of farms, fields, woods, watercourses, dispersed businesses and residential properties, the only nucleated settlement being Sutton St Nicholas which includes the former parish village of Sutton St Michael; village entry road signs only refer to 'St Nicholas', and fingerpost road signs refer to 'Sutton'. At the north is the historical landmark of Sutton Walls, and in the south-east, the sparsely populated area of Sutton Marsh. The parish at its widest is 2 miles (3 km) east to west, and 2 miles north to south, with an area of 8.259 km^{2}. Sutton borders the parish of Marden at the north and north-west, Moreton on Lugg and Pipe and Lyde at the west, Holmer and Shelwick at the south, Withington at the south-east and east, and Preston Wynne at the north-east.

The River Lugg flows as a meander through the parish, entering from the west at the border with Marden, arcing north-east to within 500 yards (457 m) of Sutton St Michael and Nicholas, and then south to the border between Holmer and Shelwick, and Withington parishes. Little Lugg, a tributary of River Lugg, provides the parish border with Withington at Sutton Marsh, and upstream, that of Preston Wynne. Within Sutton Marsh is a drainage channel, and a tributary stream rising near the central Sutton St Nicholas, that both feed into the Little Lugg. All roads within the parish are minor. Three through roads cross the parish. A road from Marden enters at the north-west and runs directly south-east through Suttons Michael and Nicholas, then locally named Ridgeway Road, and runs into Withington parish to the A465. At St Nicholas is a crossroad where the road from the village of Bodenham Moor to the north crosses Ridgeway Road and runs south through Holmer and Shelwick to Hereford. The third road is Wyatt Road, which runs north to south through the extreme east of the parish, from Venn's Green at the north to Withington Marsh at the south; a junction on Wyatt Road is with Churchway, which runs south-west to Ridgeway Road and St Nicholas, Church. All other roads are non-through country lanes, cul-de-sacs, access roads and tracks.

== Community ==
Within the parish, at Sutton St Nicholas, is Sutton Primary Academy, a mixed primary school for 4- to 11-year-olds, on Bayley Way off the Sutton St Nicholas to Bodenham Moor road. The school is part of the Herefordshire Marches Federation of Academies. In its 2017 Ofsted report the school received a rating of Grade 1, Outstanding overall and in all areas. The closest secondary school is Aylestone School, with tertiary education at Hereford Sixth Form College, Herefordshire and Ludlow College, and Hereford College of Arts, all at Hereford.

Within the parish are two Anglican parish churches, St Michael's and St Nicholas', serving a joint parish congregation, and within the Diocese of Hereford. St Nicholas is supported by the Herefordshire Historic Churches Trust charity. The public house is the Golden Cross Inn at the major crossroad in Sutton St Nicholas. Also on Bayley Way at St Nicholas is the village hall, which provides events and classes, and holds meetings of the parish council. At the extreme east of the parish on Wyatt Road is a cake making business and a holiday converted barn rental establishment.

The parish is served by two bus stops on the 426 Hereford to Leominster route, one at the south on the road to Shelwick Green, at Wergins Bridge over the River Lugg, and one at the Golden Cross Inn in St Nicholas village. The closest rail connection is at Hereford railway station, 3 miles (5 km) to the south on the Crewe to Newport Welsh Marches Line, which is also the terminus of the Cotswold Line, and also provides a West Midlands Trains service to Birmingham New Street. The closest hospital is Hereford County Hospital at Hereford.

== Landmarks ==
Within Sutton are thirty-five Grade II and two Grade II* listed buildings and structures, all but five within the villages of St Nicholas. The Grade II* listed are the churches of St Nicholas and St Michael. There are six Grade II listed barns within Sutton St Nicholas village, and three more within the wider parish, all dating probably from the 18th to the early 19th century, and five Grade II listed farmhouses, all dating to the 17th century.

St Nicholas' Church dates to the 12th century, with 13th- and 14th-century additions and a mid-19th-century restoration. Of sandstone, it comprises a concrete tile roof chancel, a slate tile roof nave, a "large" 14th-century south transept running from the nave, a north 14th- or 15th-century slate tile roof porch, a 19th-century south vestry; and a western two-stage, angle-buttressed tower, with lancet windows, which dates to the 13th century. The chancel is of three bays, the nave, four. The interior contains a barrel vaulted ceiling to the nave which is separated from the south transept by a double-arch arcade. The chancel roof is possibly mid-19th-century barrel vaulted. The restored chancel screen is possibly 15th- or 16th century, the communion table, 17th; the oak hexagonal pulpit is early 17th century, as is the pannelled side lectern; a late 17th-century "small" communion table is next to the chancel screen. There are three 14th-century piscinae with decorative surrounds, one each in the chancel, nave, and south transept. The font bowl is 12th century and sits on a mid-19th-century plinth. At 25 yards (23 m) south from the chancel is the Grade II octagonal base of a churchyard cross, of sandstone, and dating to the 14th or 15th century, with a remaining socket in the top for a cross shaft. Just inside the churchyard is a war memorial, erected in 1919 by the parishioners of Sutton to commemorate the seven who fell during the First World War. On a rectangular two-step base, the memorial is Celtic Revival, with a wheel-head cross and relief-carved interlaced decorative details. At 25 yards (23 m) south from the chancel is the listed remaining base of a 14th- or 15th-century churchyard cross. Also within churchyard, at 3 yards (3 m) north-east from the church, is the Grade II chest tomb to William Spencer, who died in 1780, with floriate and gadroon elements and a 19th-century pyramid slab.

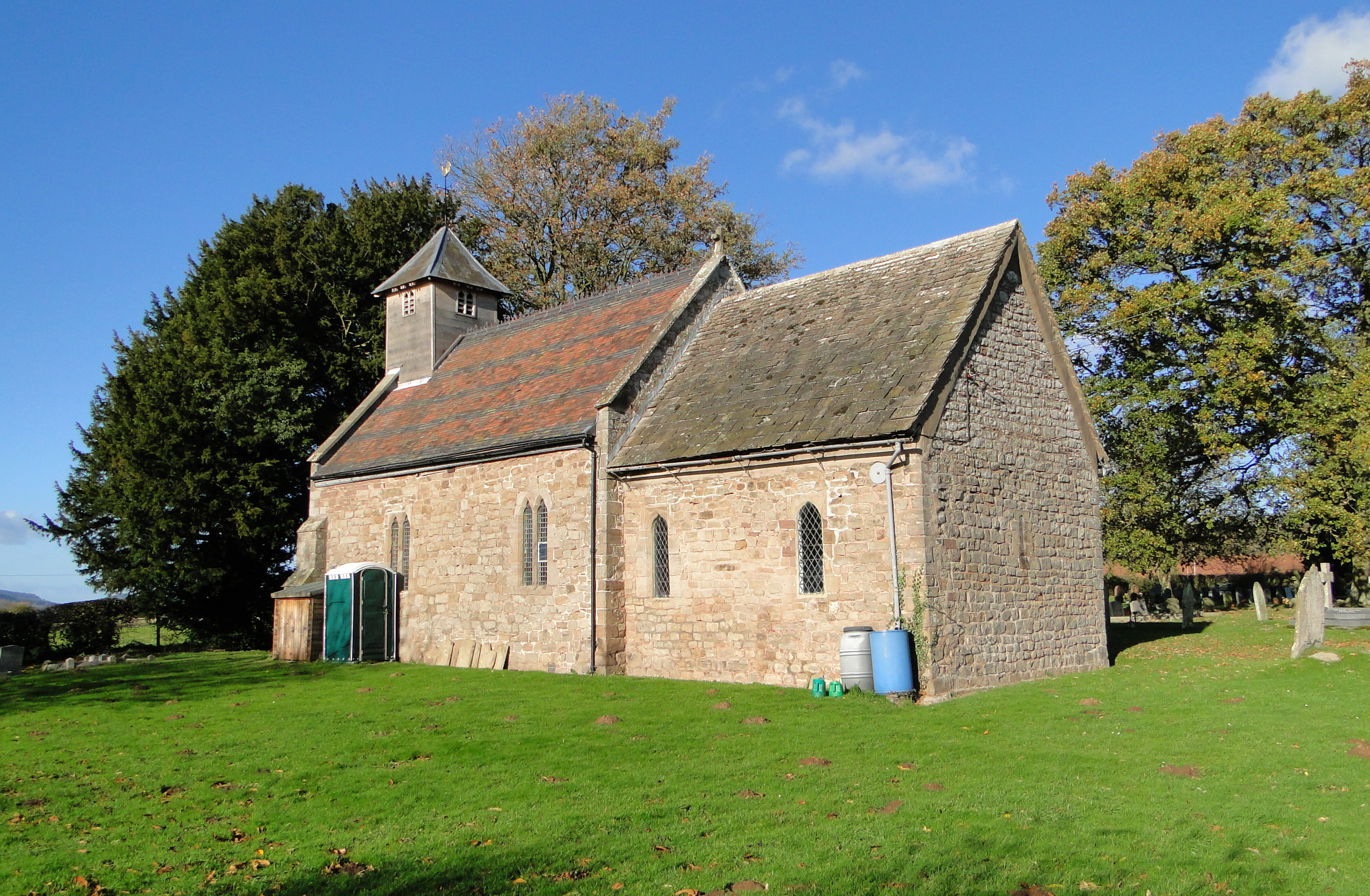
St Michael's church, Sutton

St Michael's Church is a former parish church which dates chiefly to the 12th century, and was restored in 1865 and 1909. Constructed of sandstone, it comprises a stone slate roof chancel, a tile roofed nave with a timber west bell turret, and an early 20th-century west porch. The chancel and nave are both of two bays. Of the chancel's 12th-century single light windows, two were altered in the 14th century with the addition of ogee trefoils. Architecture at the west of the nave could indicate a former west tower. Between north 'Y'-traceried windows in the nave is evidence of a 12th-century window, now blocked. The interior roof is plastered barrel vaulted. There are two fonts. The first dates to the 12th century, and comprises a "round bowl, cylindrical stem and four carved lions with emphasis on their fur on the base". The second font, on the window cill of the nave at the south-east and c.1645, is small and "urn-shaped... gadroon rimmed [and] supported by a possibly 15th-century angel holding a book". At the west of the nave south wall is a monument to Elizabeth Cotton (died 1645), with a "broken pediment supported by barley-sugar columns" and includes two female figures and a semi-reclining cadaver.

Sutton Court is a brick house dressed with stone, and dates to the late 18th century, with alterations in the mid- to late 19th, and is of two storeys with attic and a cellar. The Hereford and Worcester Gardens Trust describe Sutton Court as a "late Georgian house with pleasure grounds and a small park", and a kitchen garden. The late 19th- and 20th-century owners, Robert and Sarah Backhouse bred new cultivars of daffodils between 1886 and 1940, some of which survive in the grounds.

Freens' Court is an Historic England scheduled monument, listed since 1992, and described as a 'magnate's residence', 700 yards (640 m) west from St Michael's Church, and as "fairly good." The earthwork remains date to the Early Middle Ages. The house on the site was demolished in 1957, but in 1932 was described as 15th century built by the Lingen family, and of "three tenements,... two storeys, timber-framed and with slate or stone-covered roofs". The house was two-storey, timber-framed, and 'H' plan with cross wings facing the east and west, both extended in the 16th and 17th century. The original central hall, predating the wings, had been demolished and replaced by a "modern passage" aisle linking the wings. The roof was tiled, with the east wing containing a "stone chimney-stack with diagonal shafts of brick". By 1932, the earlier internal panelling, fireplace and heraldic glass had been removed. Ancillary structures included a 17th-century timber-framed tile-roof outbuilding at the north of the east wing. There was a rockery at the south of the house with "a number of 13th-century carved and moulded stones." There had been a moat surrounding the house, but evidence of this in 1932 was fragmentary. In 1999, Time Team undertook a geophysical survey and archeological dig centred on Freen's Court to identify any evidence for a possible Mercian royal palace, and found "possible Saxon structures and ditches, as well as later medieval features." Trenches were dug in the vicinity of the church of St Michael, including a field north of the church, in cropmarks at the site of Freen's Court aisled hall, and within Sutton Walls hillfort.

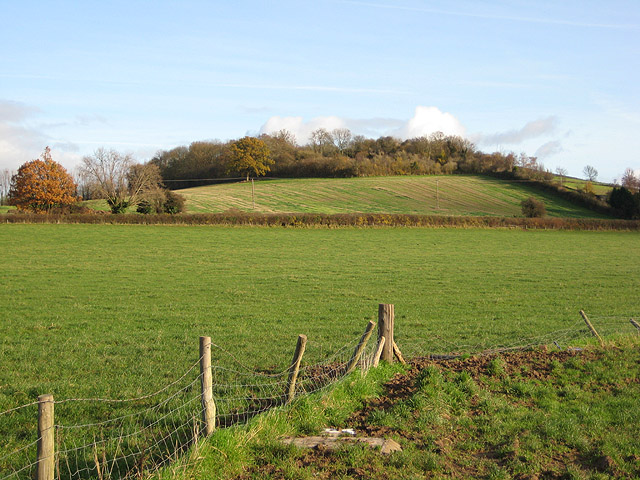
Sutton Walls Hill Fort

Sutton Walls hillfort, at the north of the parish adjacent to the parish of Marden and 600 yards (549 m) north from St Michael's church, is a traditional possible location for the palace or part of the royal estate of the eighth-century king Offa of Mercia, although no archaeological excavations to date have supported this. The site is 900 yards (820 m) east to west and 300 yards (270 m) north to south at its widest, of 29 acres (12 ha), and rises to 100 metres (330 ft) at its "plateau-like top... [of] irregular shape following the natural contours". The only observable defences are a rampart of 50 yards (46 m), while there is no evidence of any defensive ditch. There are two original entrances, one at the east and one at the west, three others of later date, and one more modern. Pottery finds could put the origin date to the Early Iron Age, while Samian ware and skeleton finds indicate some Roman occupation. In his Life of St Ethelbert, which describes the murder of Ethelbert by King Offa, the historian Gerald of Wales (Giraldus Cambrensis), calls the site 'Villa Australis.' The 16th-century antiquarian John Leland reports the remains of a "a stone castle." An Inventory of the Historical Monuments in Herefordshire posits that such evidence points to the site being "occupied in late Celtic, Roman and Anglo-Saxon times."
