= Newton, Hampton Court =

Hamlet and civil parish in Herefordshire, England

Coordinates: 52.1808°N 2.72340°W

Newton
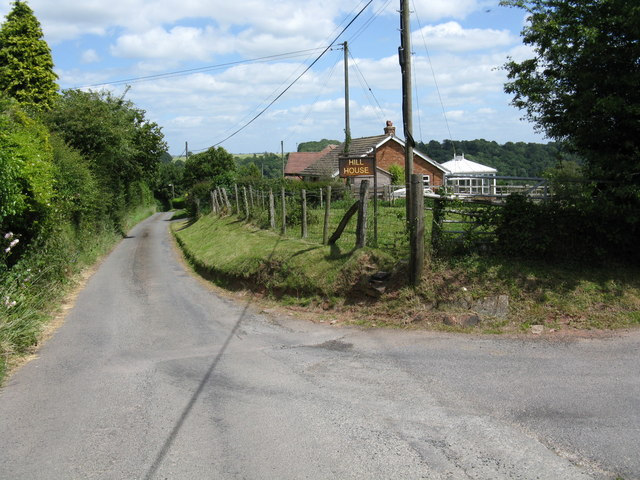
- Newton Lane

- Location within Herefordshire
- OS grid reference: SO506538
  - London: 120 mi (190 km) SE
- Unitary authority: Herefordshire
- Ceremonial county: Herefordshire
- Region: West Midlands
- Country: England
- Sovereign state: United Kingdom
- Post town: Leominster
- Postcode district: HR6
- Dialling code: 01568
- Police: West Mercia
- Fire: Hereford and Worcester
- Ambulance: West Midlands
- UK Parliament: North Herefordshire

Newton is a linear settlement hamlet and civil parish in the county of Herefordshire, England, and is 10 miles (16 km) north from the city and county town of Hereford. The closest large town is the market town of Leominster, 3 miles (5 km) to the north. A Cadbury's confectionery factory is within the parish.

== History ==
Newton is derived from the Old English 'nēowa' with 'tūn', meaning "the new farmstead, estate or village".

Newton is listed in the Domesday Book, as in the Hundred of Tornelaus and the county of Herefordshire. At the time of the Norman Conquest the manor contained 6 households. Lordship in 1066 was held by Bruning under the over-lordship of Queen Edith. Bernard became lord in 1086 with William d'Ecouis as tenant-in-chief to king William I.

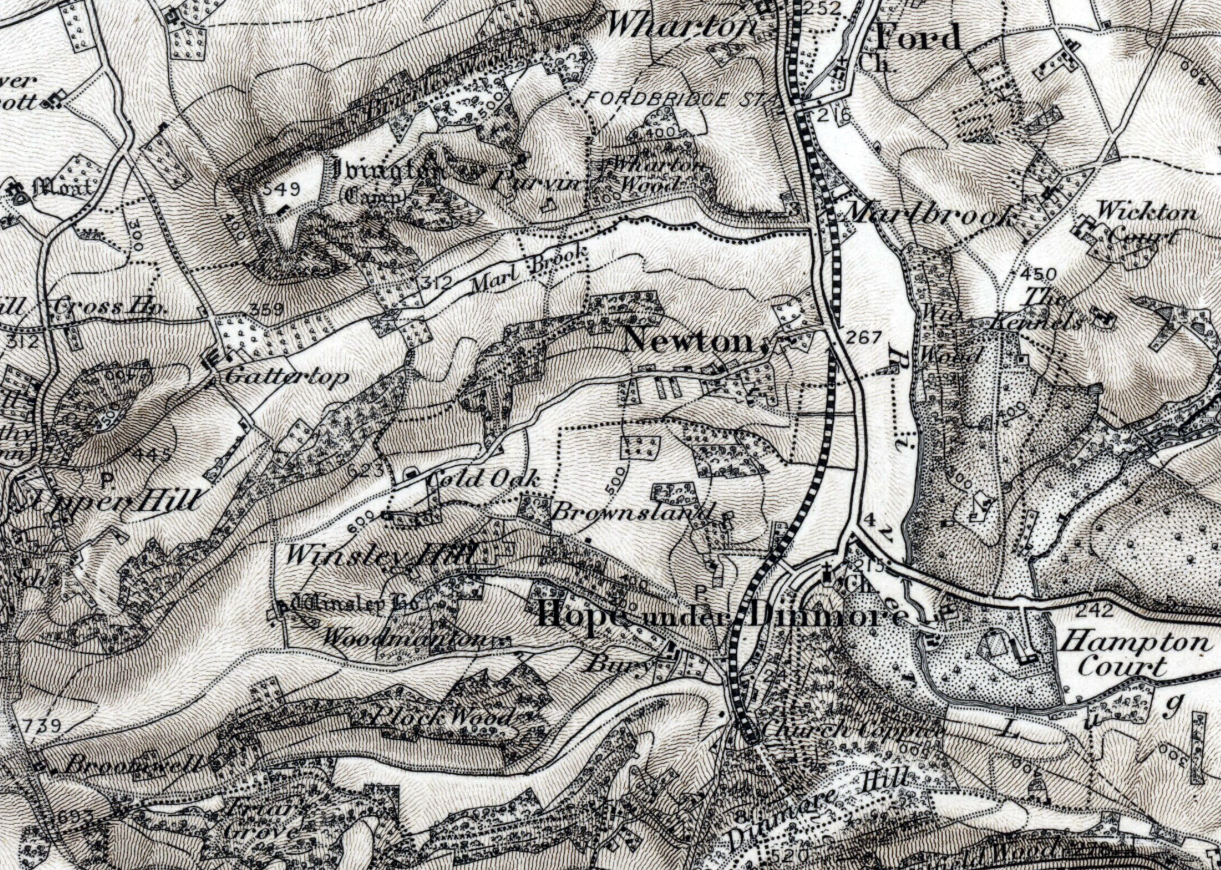
Newton in 1898

In 1885 Newton, on the Shrewsbury and Hereford Railway, was a township in the parish of Croft which was north from Leominster, but from which Newton was alienated, and the Hundred of Wolphy in the northern division of Herefordshire, and part of the union—poor relief and joint workhouse provision set up under the Poor Law Amendment Act 1834—petty sessional division and county court district of Leominster. There was no church or chapel, the inhabitants attending churches in the parishes of Ford, or Hope under Dinmore under which ecclesiastical jurisdiction Newton was part. The chief landowner and lord of the manor was John Arkwright DL JP, who lived at Hampton Court. The chief crops grown were wheat, beans, root vegetables and hops, with orchards and pasture, on a light alluvial soil. The parish area was 507 acres (205 hectares) on which lived an 1881 population of 66. Post was delivered by foot from Leominster, at which was the nearest money order office. Children attended school at Hope under Dinmore. There were three farmers, two of whom were also hop growers.

== Geography ==
Newton is approximately 1,200 yards (1,000 m) at its widest from north to south and 2 miles (3 km) east to west, with an area of 0.8 square miles (2 km^{2}). Adjacent parishes are Hope under Dinmore clockwise from the south-east to the north-west, Leominster at the north, the boundary defined by the Marl Brook tributary of the River Lugg, and Ford and Stoke Prior at the north-east with the boundary formed by the River Lugg. The parish is rural, of farms, fields, managed woodland, orchards, and isolated and dispersed businesses and residential properties. The only major route is the A49 Hereford Road running north to south through the east of the parish. Parallel to the A49 at its west is the B4361 which joins the A49 at a roundabout within the parish. Running between the two roads is the Crewe to Newport railway on the Welsh Marches Line. The only other route is a cul-de-sac minor road, Newton Lane, which runs 1.5 miles (2 km) east to west through the parish from a junction with the B4361.

== Governance ==
Newton is represented in the lowest tier of UK governance by the Hope under Dinmore and Newton Group Parish Council. As Herefordshire is a unitary authority—no district council between parish and county councils—the parish is represented as part of the Queenswood Ward on Herefordshire County Council. The parish is represented in the UK Parliament as part of the North Herefordshire constituency.

In 1974 Newton became part of the now defunct Leominster District of the county of Hereford and Worcester, instituted under the Local Government Act 1972.

== Community ==
The parish is served by bus route stops on the B4361 road, providing connections between Leominster and Hereford. The closest rail connection is at Leominster railway station, 2 miles (3 km) to the north. The nearest hospital is Leominster Community Hospital at Leominster, with the nearest major hospital Hereford County Hospital at Hereford.

The nearest school is Stoke Prior Primary School in Stoke Prior village, 2 miles (3 km) to the north-east. Within the parish is a Cadbury's confectionery factory at Marlbrook, a cider and perry producer with associated orchards, a veterinary surgery, and the headquarters of an amateur radio society. There is only one listed building in the parish, that of the Grade II Hill House, dating to the mid-18th century with later alterations.
