= Dinmore, Herefordshire =

Human settlement in Herefordshire, England

Coordinates: 52.15°N 2.75°W

Dinmore
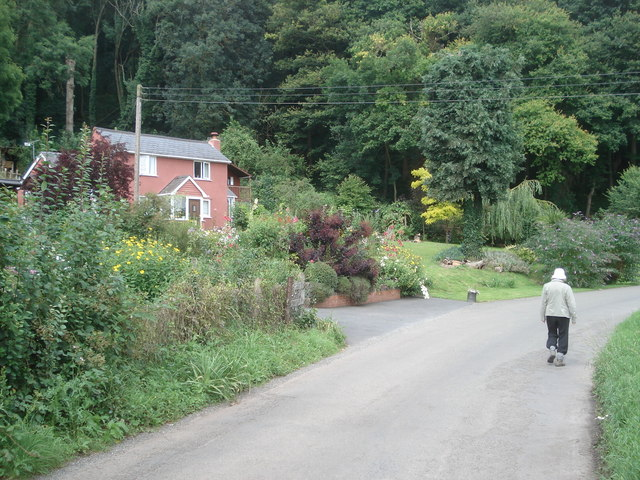

- Location within Herefordshire
- Population: 7
- Unitary authority: Herefordshire
- Ceremonial county: Herefordshire
- Region: West Midlands
- Country: England
- Sovereign state: United Kingdom
- Post town: Hereford
- Postcode district: HR4
- Dialling code: 01432
- Police: West Mercia
- Fire: Hereford and Worcester
- Ambulance: West Midlands
- UK Parliament: North Herefordshire

Dinmore is a geographically small civil parish in Herefordshire, England. The parish had an estimated population in mid-2010 of 7, the smallest in the county.

== History ==
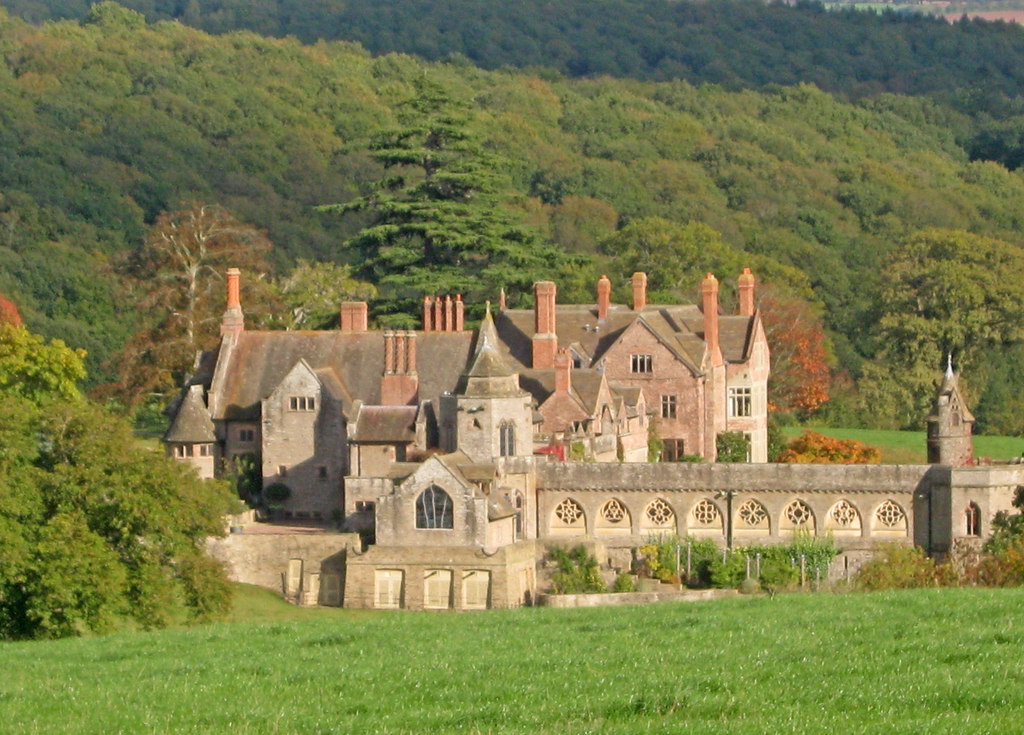
Dinmore Manor

The manor house was, before Henry VIII, the Preceptory of the Knights of St John of Jerusalem, incorporated in 1189 as part of its manor house grounds. The preceptory's construction coincided with the advent of the common law and the reign of King Richard the Lionheart, who, among the counties and countries he saw, relatively often visited Herefordshire. The Knights were Hospitallers in the vanguard of the Crusades, whose order also helped fund the wars. The house has replaced the Norman England-built preceptory.

In the grounds of this manor which replaced the preceptory's own farm is its ruined chapel which was in the late nineteenth century (heavily) restored and cut in length, seating 50. The chapel was built in the 14th century during the Hundred Years War. It retains a recessed spire in the west tower.

== Geography ==
The parish is of 580 acres (2.3 km^{2}), with a large minority of woodland. It rises to 210 m at a short distance west of the present manor (preceptory). The lowest part, the east, sharply drops to the course of the upper River Lugg above Hereford which it flows through. It runs at about 60 m above sea level.

Year	Acres	Population
1831	640	21
1851	570	26
1881	570	24
1891	580	35
1961	580	19

=== Farms ===
The main buildings in the parish are Dinmore Manor which operates a racehorse business and Upper Dinmore and Kipperknowle Farms, home of a herd of pedigree Limousin cattle.

== See also ==
- Dinmore Hill
- Dinmore Tunnel
- Hope under Dinmore
