= Dragon of Mordiford =

English legendary creature

The Dragon of Mordiford is a legendary creature that was said to reside just outside the Herefordshire village of Mordiford, at the confluence of the River Lugg and the River Wye.

== Differing Accounts ==
There are multiple accounts of the dragon that have it take different forms.

=== Maud and the Wyvern ===
One version of the legend explains that the dragon – a wyvern in this account – was found by a little girl from Mordiford named Maud, who had desperately wanted a pet. While wandering the forest adjacent to her village one day, Maud had found a small bright creature with a snout and small, translucent wings prowling around a small group of flowers. Excited by the creature, the girl took it home to show to her parents. Immediately her mother and father realized it was a wyvern and commanded Maud to take it back to where she had found it because it would cause trouble in the village. The indignant Maud pretended to obey but instead hid the infant dragon in a safe place in the forest. There she nurtured her "pet" with milk, playing with it and watching it try to fly. The dragon grew vastly each month, eventually taking on an emerald hue and developing thick, powerful wings.

In the legend, after reaching maturity, the dragon's hunger could not be satisfied with milk anymore—it now had an enormous hunger for meat. Soon, it began to plague the local farms, killing their livestock, especially cows and sheep, and farmers were intolerant. These men tried to stop the beast by extermination, but it soon feasted upon them, finding human flesh delicious. Maud implored the beast during her visits afterward to stop its rampage. Still the beast, now fully mature, killed everything in its way except for Maud, its only friend.

The townspeople in the tale grew exhausted of the constant attacks from the dragon and desperate, sought help from the noblemen of Mordiford. A man from the local Garstone family set out in full armour to end the beast's life forever, finding the beast nearly camouflaged into the forest's many plants. The dragon almost instantly released a blast of fire, Garstone barely deflecting it. He aimed a lance at the wyvern's throat, releasing it and fully penetrating through the dragon. Maud, insane with rage and grief, burst from the surrounding forest and came to mourn her past pet.

=== The Convict and the Serpent ===
In another account, the Mordiford Dragon was more serpentine and lived in Haugh Wood for some years. The poisonous creature terrorized the area to the point where it decreased the working population of the town. Eventually a local convict offered to kill the creature if he were given a pardon. The pardon was granted, and the convict acquired a bow, arrows, and a large cider barrel. He then concealed himself in the barrel at the River Lugg, where the serpent drank its water. Once the dragon arrived at the river, the convict shot an arrow through a hole in the barrel, piercing the creature's heart. But as the dragon died, its poison flowed into the barrel, killing the convict as well.

== Legacy and Basis ==
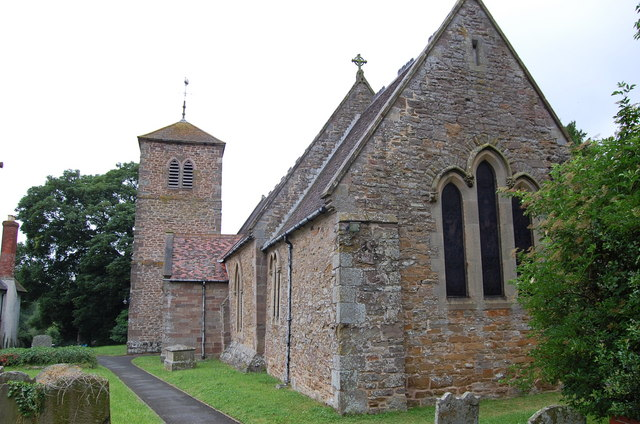
Holyrood Church in Mordiford

The story of the dragon remains part of Mordiford's culture: it is continually mentioned in modern records of the village. A portrait of the dragon – depicting it as a green wyvern – appeared on the wall of the main church of the village until the church was repaired and renovated in 1811. Supposedly it was removed because a rector considered it "heathenish." A reproduction of this painting of the dragon is displayed inside the church.

Some verses from 1670 refer to the dragon in the Mordiford church:

This is the true Effigy of that strange
Prodigious monster which our woods did range
In Eastwood it by Garston's hand was slaine,
A truth which old mythologists maintaine

The name Garston corresponds to a local well-to-do family – one that the local parish records note made charitable bequests to the local church in the 16th and 17th centuries. Paul Newman speculates that the slayer's identity as a convict was added to the serpent version of the tale to make it into a "local villain-makes-good story."

Supposedly, as late as 1875, a pair of old women could be seen killing newts from the River Lugg, believing that the animals were "the seed of the dragon" and that if they were not ritually sacrificed, the dragon would reappear and wreak havoc once again.

A local group has created the Mordiford Dragon Trail, which tells the story of the Maud and the Dragon with the help of statues on a 1.4 mile walk around the village. The Mordiford Dragon Trail opened in 2022 and begins on The Lower Green with an information board.

== See also ==
- The dragon and daughter

== Sources ==
- Newman, Paul (1979). The Hill of the Dragon: An Enquiry into the Nature of Dragon Legends. Bath: Kingsmead Press. pp. 148–151. ISBN 0-906230-70-5.
- Shuker, Karl (1995). Dragons: A Natural History. New York: Barnes and Noble. ISBN 0-7607-4551-X.
