= Amberley, Herefordshire =

Coordinates: 52.1235°N 2.66468°W

Amberley
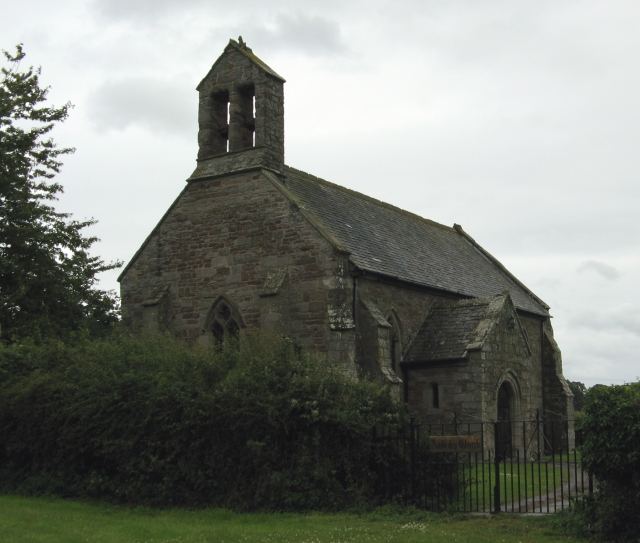
- Amberley Chapel

- Location within Herefordshire
- OS grid reference: SO5447
- Civil parish: Marden
- Unitary authority: County of Herefordshire
- Ceremonial county: Herefordshire
- Region: West Midlands
- Country: England
- Sovereign state: United Kingdom
- Police: West Mercia
- Fire: Hereford and Worcester
- Ambulance: West Midlands
- UK Parliament: North Herefordshire

Amberley is a settlement in the civil parish of Marden, in Herefordshire, England.

Recorded in the Domesday Book, it was in the hundred of Tornelaus. In the National Gazetteer of Britain and Ireland of 1868, it was listed as being in the hundred of Broxash, about two miles (3.2 km) east of the village church of Marden.

Amberley was formerly a township in the parish of Marden, in 1866 Amberley became a separate civil parish, on 24 March 1887 the parish was abolished and merged with Sutton and Bodenham. In 1881 the parish had a population of 34.

Amberley has a Grade II* listed chapel built between the 12th and 14th centuries, and restored in 1865. Amberley Court is a 14th-century, 13,000 square feet (1,200 m^{2}) Grade I listed country house.
