= Ford Bridge railway station =

Former railway station in Herefordshire, England

Ford Bridge

General information
- Location: Marlbrook, Herefordshire; England
- Coordinates: 52.1925°N 2.7189°W
- Grid reference: SO509551
- Platforms: 2

Other information
- Status: Disused

History
- Original company: Shrewsbury and Hereford Railway
- Pre-grouping: GWR and LNWR joint
- Post-grouping: GWR and LMS joint

Key dates
- 1854: Opened
- 1954: Closed
Location

Ford Bridge railway station was a station in Marlbrook, Herefordshire, England, was established in 1854 and ceased operations in 1954. Following its closure, the station building was repurposed into a private residence.

Preceding station	Disused railways	Following station
Leominster; Line and station open	GWR and LNWR joint Shrewsbury and Hereford Railway	Dinmore; Line open, station closed
