= Queen's Wood Country Park =

Country park in Herefordshire, England

Coordinates: 52.15740°N 2.72435°W

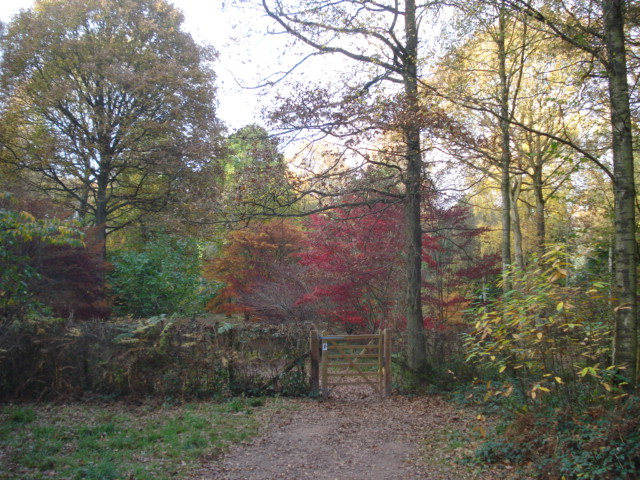
Entrance to the Autumn Garden portion of Queen’s Wood Country Park

Queen's Wood Country Park is the only designated country park in the county of Herefordshire. A tourist attraction on Dinmore Hill, it has two components. Its arboretum is a 47-acre (0.19 km^{2}) tree collection with over 1,200 rare and frequently exotic trees. Queens Wood's ancient woodland is a 123-acre (0.50 km^{2}) lightly coppiced woodland to maintain a semi-natural habitat which is designated a Site of Special Scientific Interest (SSSI) and Local Nature Reserve (LNR).The site is managed by a partnership between Herefordshire Wildlife Trust and New Leaf.

The country park lies within the civil parishes of Bodenham, Hope under Dinmore and Wellington.

== History ==
Queens Wood is a fragment of the vast ancient oak wood that once stretched to the Welsh borders and beyond. It frequently reverted to the source of all estates, "the crown" (the monarch) intermittently, and changed its name from 'Kings Wood' to 'Queen's Wood' in the reign of Queen Elizabeth I. During the 17th century Queens Wood belonged to the adjacent Hampton Court House or Castle which is on the opposite side of the local main road. During World War I the woods were virtually clear-felled to provide timber for the war effort.

== Arboretum ==
The planting of the arboretum at Queen's Wood began in 1953 to mark the coronation of Queen Elizabeth II. It was funded by an ongoing public appeal - 'The Queenswood Coronation Fund' - launched by Sir Richard Cotterell who was then chairman of the Queenswood Management Committee and Lord Lieutenant of Herefordshire.

The work of the Queenswood Coronation Fund received international recognition in 1981 when the arboretum received the prestigious Dendrology Award from the International Dendrology Society in recognition of the quality of the collection of trees.

The Queenswood Coronation Fund is a perpetual fund and is now a registered charity (No. 518624).
