= Lower Lyde =

Village in Herefordshire, England

Coordinates: 52.093°N 2.705°W

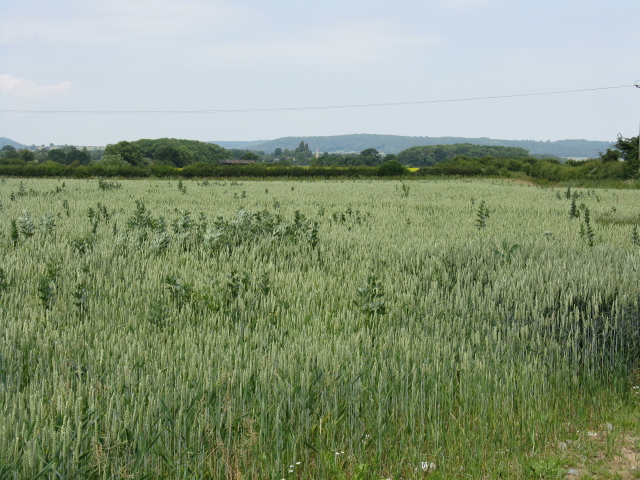
- Crops at Lower Lyde Farm

- Location within Herefordshire
- Civil parish: Pipe and Lyde
- Unitary authority: County of Herefordshire
- Ceremonial county: Herefordshire
- Region: West Midlands
- Country: England
- Sovereign state: United Kingdom
- Post town: Hereford
- Postcode district: HR4
- Dialling code: 01432
- Police: West Mercia
- Fire: Hereford and Worcester
- Ambulance: West Midlands
- UK Parliament: North Herefordshire

Lower Lyde is a small village in Herefordshire, around 3 miles (5 km) north of Hereford city centre. It forms part of the Pipe and Lyde civil parish. The village can be easily accessed from the A49 road.

The main buildings are Lower Lyde Farm and Lower Lyde Court, a venue for weddings and performing arts events.

In the valley below the village are the River Lugg, the Welsh Marches railway line and the Wergins Stone, a prehistoric standing stone.
