= Richard de Quincey =

Captain Richard Saher de Quincey ("the Captain") (12 November 1896, Surbiton, Surrey – 30 December 1965, Marden, Herefordshire) was a noted British cattle breeder.

De Quincey fought in World War I as a fighter pilot in the Royal Flying Corps but was invalided out of the service as result of the effects of flying at high altitude.

De Quincy's father bought The Vern - a farm at Bodenham, Herefordshire - in 1922. The farm came with a herd of Hereford cattle which the younger de Quincey successfully improved, his bulls winning many prizes and export markets.
