= Mortimer's Cross Water Mill =

Mill in Lucton, Herefordshire, England

Coordinates: 52.2688°N 2.8423°W

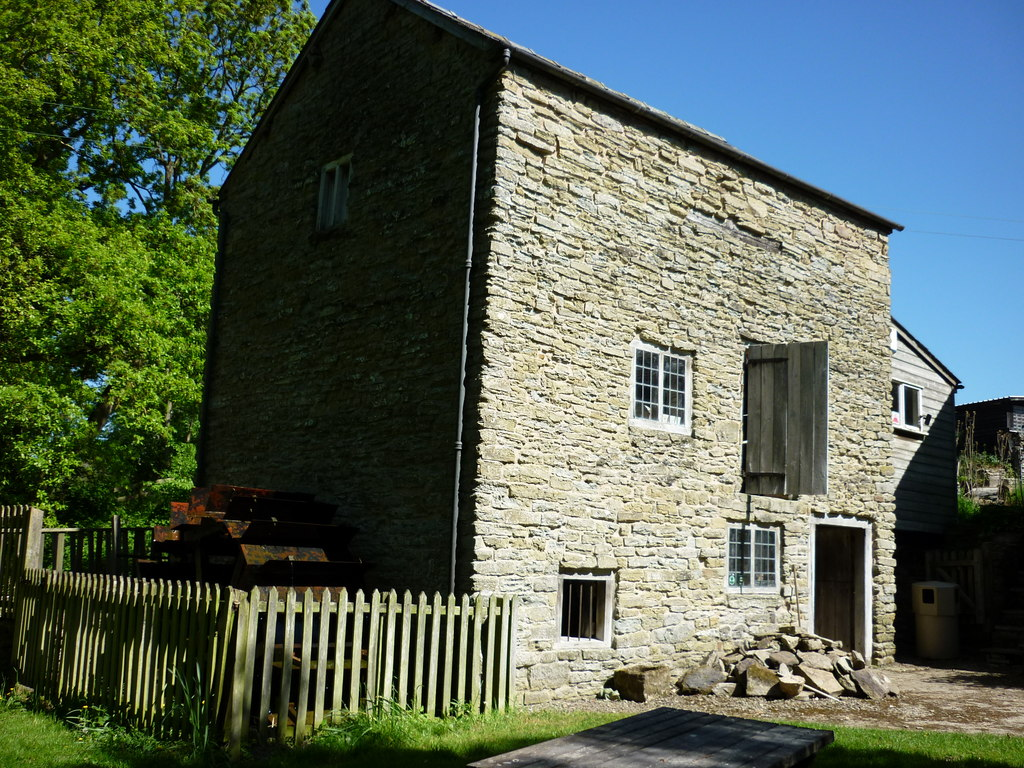
Mortimer's Cross Water Mill

Mortimer's Cross Water Mill is an 18th-century watermill located on the River Lugg, 11 km (7 mi) northwest of Leominster, Herefordshire, England. It is owned by Historic England and is in partial working order.
