= The dragon and daughter =

Danish folk tale

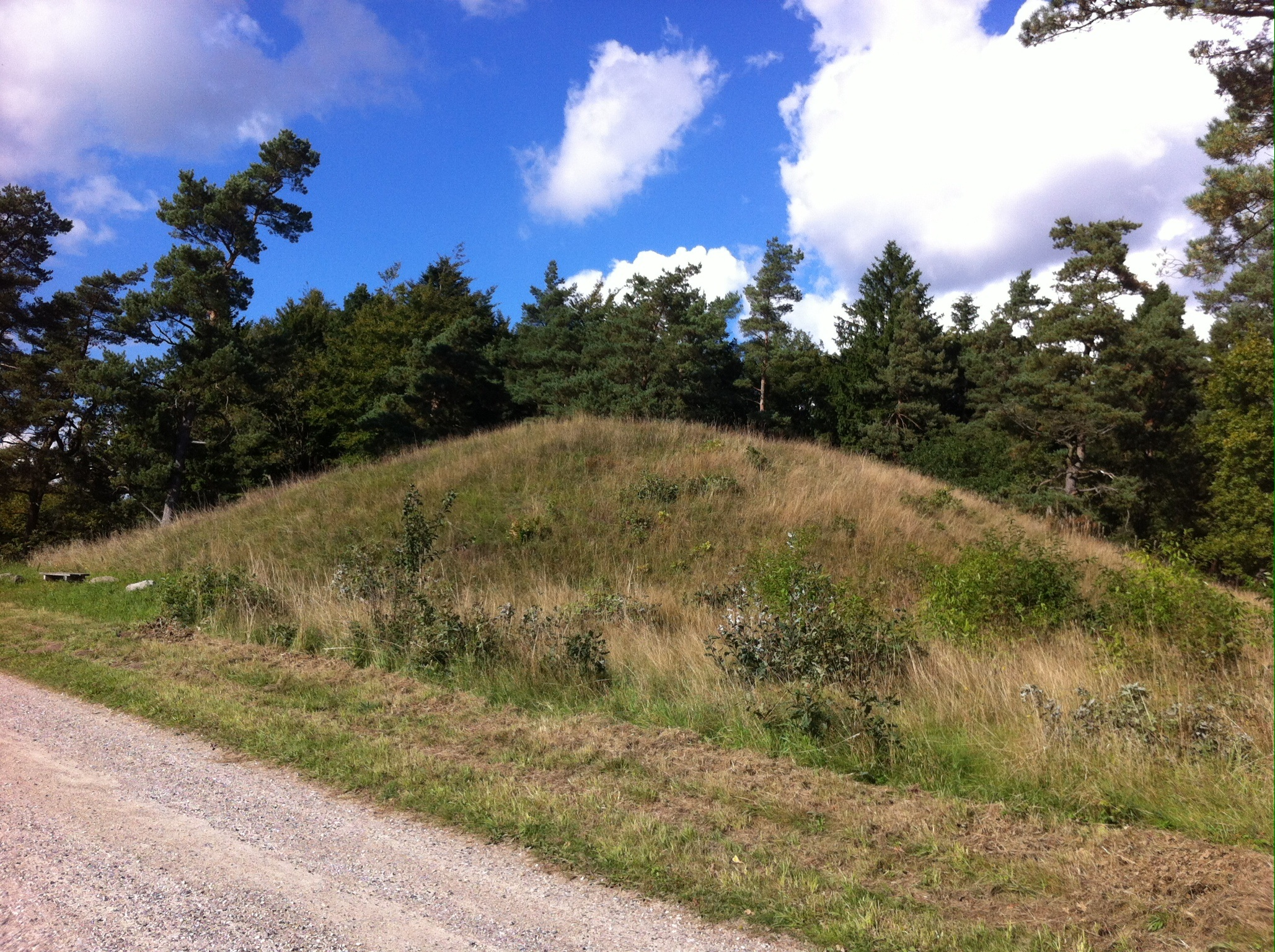
Lindhøj (Hadsund)

The dragon and daughter (Danish: lindorm og jomfru) is a Danish folktale.

== Story ==
Once upon a time, a father was gathering nuts in the forest for his daughter. One nut had a worm inside, which the daughter took care of. Over time, the worm grew into a dragon. The daughter was not able to send away the dragon. On the advice of the villager, the daughter left with the Lindworm for an island. However, the island did not have a hill, so the daughter and dragon moved to the north of the island. Daughter and dragon lived in Lundø island for several years. Dragon lived digging hole in Lundø island. There was the place with the hill called Hald. The dragon and daughter lived in Hald. It is said that the place was called Lindhöj.(mean "The hill of the dragon").

== Original text ==
28. Der var en jomfru, hendes fader havde fundet en nød i en skov, og så tog han den med hjem og gav datteren den. Der var en orm i den, og den opelskede hun og havde i en æske så længe, til den blev til en lindorm. Hun kunde ikke siden blive den kvit; men så blev der rådet hende, at hun skulde rejse over til en ø med den, hvor der ingen höje var. Så søgte hun til Lundø, og der boede hun i nogle år ude nord på landet. Lindormen gravede sig allerførst et hul ned i jorden, men så var der en höj ovre i Hald, der rejste denover til og boede i, og siden kaldtes denne höj Lindhöj.

— Ane Kirstine Refsgård, Rødding.

== See also ==
- Dragon of Mordiford
- Danish folklore
