= Marlbrook, Herefordshire =

Industrial park in Herefordshire, England

Coordinates: 52.18746°N 2.71816°W

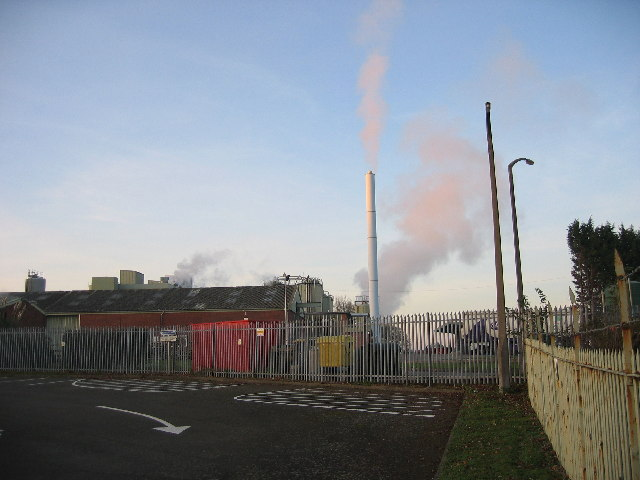
Cadbury's chocolate factory

Marlbrook is an industrial and business park on the borders of and split between the civil parishes of Hope under Dinmore and Newton, in Herefordshire, England.

The park is adjacent to the River Lugg and the A49 road, 4.5 miles (7 km) south of Leominster and 9.5 miles (15 km) north from Hereford. Just south of the park is the junction of the A49 with the A417 road towards Ledbury and Gloucester.

The Cadbury factory at Marlbrook processes 180 million litres of fresh milk, 56,000 tonnes of sugar and 13,000 tonnes of cocoa liquor each year to produce milk chocolate crumb which is blended with cocoa butter, refined and turned into milk chocolate at other factories. On 23 June 2006, the factory was in the news when more than a million chocolate bars were to be removed from sale through fears that they might have been contaminated with salmonella by a leaking pipe.
