= Upper Lyde =

Village in Herefordshire, England

Coordinates: 52.096°N 2.738°W

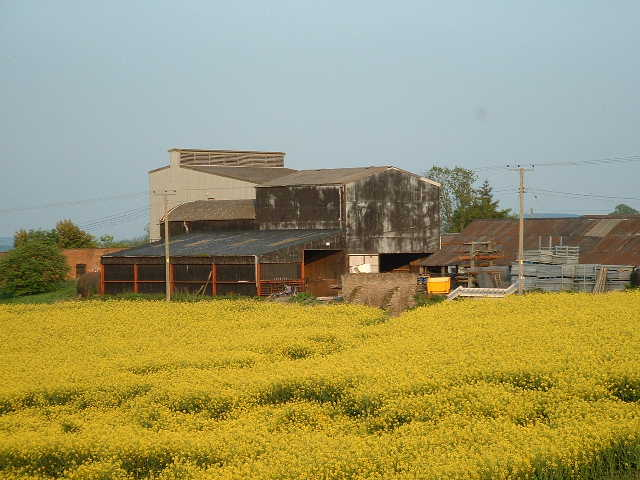
- Upper Lyde Farm buildings viewed across a field of rapeseed

- Location within Herefordshire
- Civil parish: Pipe and Lyde
- Unitary authority: County of Herefordshire
- Ceremonial county: Herefordshire
- Region: West Midlands
- Country: England
- Sovereign state: United Kingdom
- Post town: Hereford
- Postcode district: HR4
- Dialling code: 01432
- Police: West Mercia
- Fire: Hereford and Worcester
- Ambulance: West Midlands
- UK Parliament: North Herefordshire

Upper Lyde is a small village in Herefordshire, England, around 4 miles (6 km) north of Hereford city centre. It forms part of the Pipe and Lyde civil parish.

Ruins of a timber castle can be found near the village The village can be easily accessed from the A49 road.
