= Mordiford =

Village in Herefordshire, England

Coordinates: 52.03333°N 2.62822°W

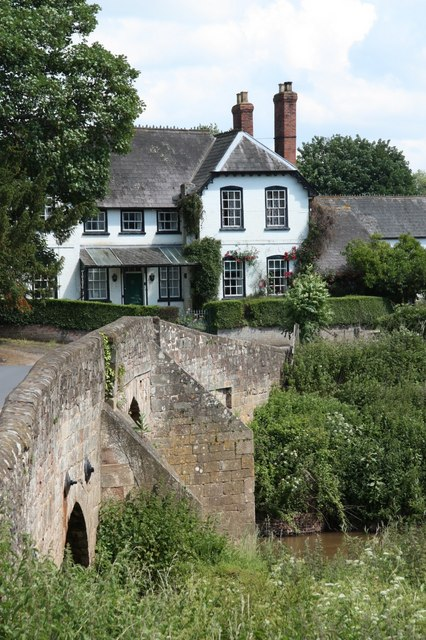
- Mordiford Bridge

- Location within Herefordshire
- Population: 527 (2011)
- OS grid reference: SO570374
- Civil parish: Hereford
- Unitary authority: Herefordshire
- Ceremonial county: Herefordshire
- Region: West Midlands
- Country: England
- Sovereign state: United Kingdom
- Post town: HEREFORD
- Postcode district: HR1
- Police: West Mercia
- Fire: Hereford and Worcester
- Ambulance: West Midlands
- UK Parliament: Hereford and South Herefordshire

Mordiford is a village and civil parish in Herefordshire, England on the B4224 Hereford to Mitcheldean road 4 miles (6 km) east-southeast of the city of Hereford.

This village grew up around an ancient ford over the River Lugg. The river is now crossed by the oldest surviving bridge in Herefordshire, dating in part to c. 1352 and completed in the 16th century

Mordiford is known for the legend of the Dragon of Mordiford, which, some said, would amble down from its lair in Haugh Wood to drink from the confluence of the rivers Wye and Lugg near the village.

The Mordiford Dragon Trail opened in 2022, and describes the story of the Maud and the Dragon, with the help of statues, on a 1.4-mile (2.3 km) walk around the village.

Nearby is Sufton Court, a small Palladian mansion set in parkland.

A heart shaped corn dolly is named after the village of Mordiford.

In Mordiford, there is a pub called the Moon Inn and the Mordiford Church of England Primary School.

== See also ==
- List of places in Herefordshire
