= River Kenwater =

River in Herefordshire, England

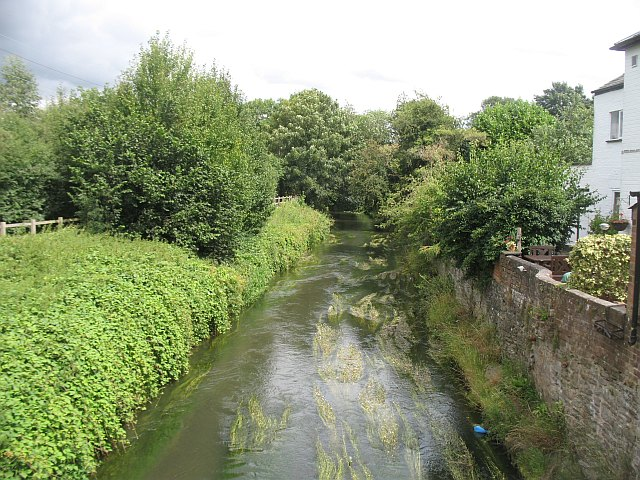
River Kenwater in Leominster

The River Kenwater or simply Kenwater is a short anabranch of the River Lugg, i.e. it splits from and later re-joins that river. It separates from it about 2 kilometres north-west of Leominster at 52.2371807°N 2.7580419°W; it flows through the town and re-joins the Lugg just outside Leominster's east boundary, at 52.2304265°N 2.7315747°W.
