= Dinmore railway station (England) =

Disused railway station in Herefordshire, England

Dinmore
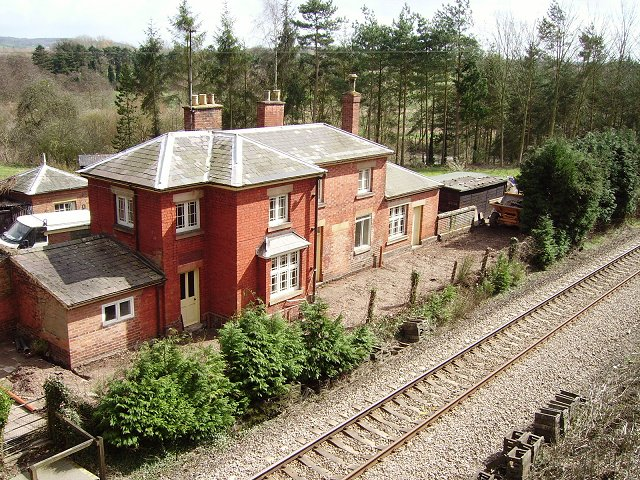
- Dinmore station

General information
- Location: Dinmore, Herefordshire; England
- Coordinates: 52.1556°N 2.7140°W
- Grid reference: SO512510
- Platforms: 2

Other information
- Status: Disused

History
- Original company: Shrewsbury and Hereford Railway
- Pre-grouping: Shrewsbury and Hereford Railway
- Post-grouping: Shrewsbury and Hereford Railway

Key dates
- 6 December 1853: Station opened
- 9 June 1958: Station closed
Location

Dinmore railway station served the villages of Bodenham and Hope under Dinmore, Herefordshire, England between 1853 and 1958.

== History ==
The main line of the Shrewsbury and Hereford Railway was authorised in 1846, and opened in two stages. The second section, between Ludlow and Hereford, opened on 6 December 1853, and one of the original stations on that stretch was named Dinmore. It was just to the south of Dinmore Tunnel, which passes under Dinmore Hill.

Dinmore station closed on 9 June 1958, but the line remains open as part of the Welsh Marches Line.

Preceding station	Historical railways	Following station
Ford Bridge; Line open, station closed	Shrewsbury and Hereford Railway	Moreton-on-Lugg; Line open, station closed
