= Moreton on Lugg =

Village in Herefordshire, England

Coordinates: 52.1079°N 2.7235°W

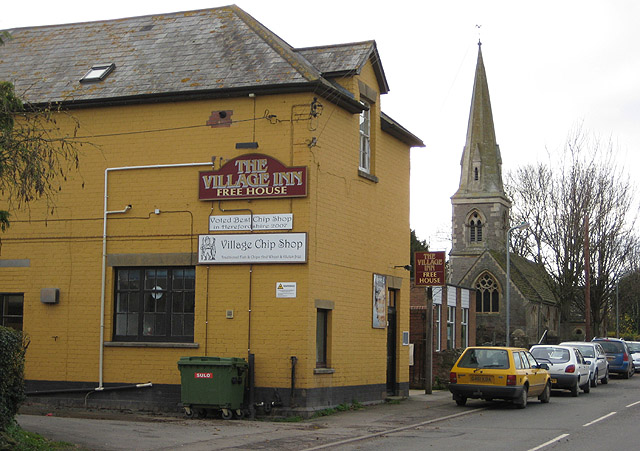
- The Village Inn with St Andrews Church in background

- Location within Herefordshire
- Population: 920 (2011 Census)
- Unitary authority: Herefordshire
- Shire county: Herefordshire
- Region: West Midlands
- Country: England
- Sovereign state: United Kingdom
- Post town: Hereford
- Postcode district: HR4
- Police: West Mercia
- Fire: Hereford and Worcester
- Ambulance: West Midlands
- UK Parliament: North Herefordshire

Moreton on Lugg is a village and civil parish in Herefordshire, England. The city and county town of Hereford is approximately 3 miles (5 km) to the south; the market town of Leominster 8 miles (13 km) to the north.

The village lies between the A49 trunk road and the Welsh Marches railway line. At the 2001 Census, the population of the village was 952, which had decreased to 920 by the time of the 2011 Census.

The settlement is mentioned in the Domesday Book as being in the Hundred of Cutestornes and having eight villagers and five slaves. The name derives from Old English Mōr-tūn (town by a fen), and its proximity to the River Lugg. In medieval times, the village was listed as Morton Juxta Logge. In the 16th century the Lords of the Manor at Morton-upon-Lugg were the Perrott family.

The village had a railway station on the Welsh Marches Line that operated between December 1853 and June 1958. In the early days of railway operation, the railway station at Moreton was notable for having its ticket office inside a hollow oak tree with a circumference of 62 feet (19 m).

The Church of St Andrew is a Grade II listed structure which was built around the 15th century and renovated in 1867. The church is in a joint benefice with the Church of St Peter at Pipe and Lyde.

On the other east of the River Lugg is Freens Court, investigated by the TV programme Time Team in 1999 as a possible site for the Saxon palace of King Offa. The dig confirmed the existence of a large aisled building but it was thought to date from the mediaeval period.

An area north of the village around SO505477 was used for many years by the Royal Army Ordnance Corps for the storage of surplus materials, including the decorations from the July 1969 investiture of the Prince of Wales. The internal railway at the RAOC site was used for training SAS troops to attack railway carriages. When the RAOC site closed in the early 2000s, it was bought by Greatwest Investments Limited for development into a business park.
