= Dinmore Hill =

Hill in Herefordshire, England

Coordinates: 52.163°N 2.715°W

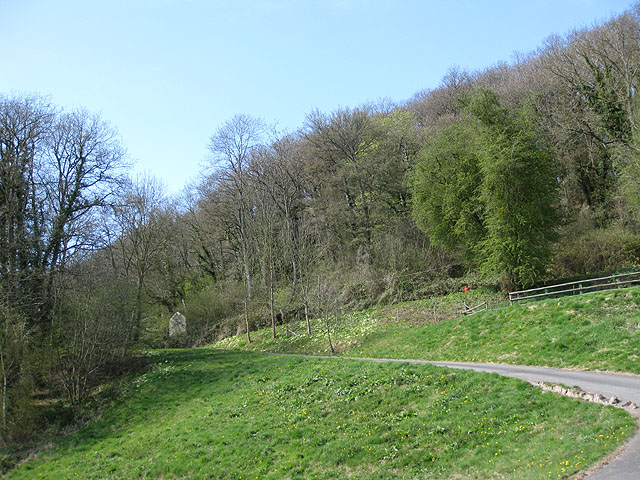
Wooded side of Dinmore Hill

Dinmore Hill rises steeply above the River Lugg in Herefordshire, England and is effectively the prominent eastern ridge of an area of high ground which reaches a height of 236 m (774 ft) at Birley Hill some 4 to 5 km (2 1/2 to 3 mi) to the west. It lies roughly midway between the town of Leominster to the north and the city of Hereford to the south, the A49 road which links them climbing the hill in a series of sweeping bends.

The north–south railway lines run within the two Dinmore Tunnels beneath the hill. In civil engineering preparation for the building of the present Hereford railway station, and as the only company planning to enter the town from the north, in 1849 the Shrewsbury and Hereford Railway company built a brick works north of Dinmore Hill, which was fed by clay from the earthworks of the tunnel being dug underneath it. In 1852, 2 1/2 years later and having used 3,250,000 bricks, the first tunnel was completed.

At the northern foot of the hill is the hamlet of Hope under Dinmore.

Queen's Wood Country Park sits within woodland atop the hill to the west of the road. An area of the flat hilltop to the east of the road was the subject of an archaeological dig by the Time Team television programme in 2009. Its three-day excavation revealed massive ditches which were interpreted as demarcating an Iron Age camp.
