= Moreton-on-Lugg railway station =

Former railway station in Herefordshire, England

Moreton-on-Lugg

General information
- Location: Moreton-on-Lugg, Herefordshire; England
- Coordinates: 52.1087°N 2.7131°W
- Grid reference: SO512458
- Platforms: 2

Other information
- Status: Disused

History
- Original company: Shrewsbury and Hereford Railway
- Pre-grouping: GWR and LNWR joint
- Post-grouping: GWR and LMS joint

Key dates
- 6 December 1853: Opened
- 9 June 1958: Closed to passengers
- 1964: Closed
Location

Moreton-on-Lugg railway station was a station in Moreton-on-Lugg, Herefordshire, England. The station was opened in 1853, closed to passengers in 1958 and closed completely in 1964.

Preceding station	Disused railways	Following station
Dinmore; Line open, station closed	GWR and LNWR joint Shrewsbury and Hereford Railway	Hereford Barton; Line and station closed
Dinmore; Line open, station closed	GWR and LNWR joint Shrewsbury and Hereford Railway	Hereford Barrs Court; Line and station open
