= Sutton Walls Hill Fort =

Iron Age hillfort near Hereford, England

Coordinates: 52.114°N 2.694°W

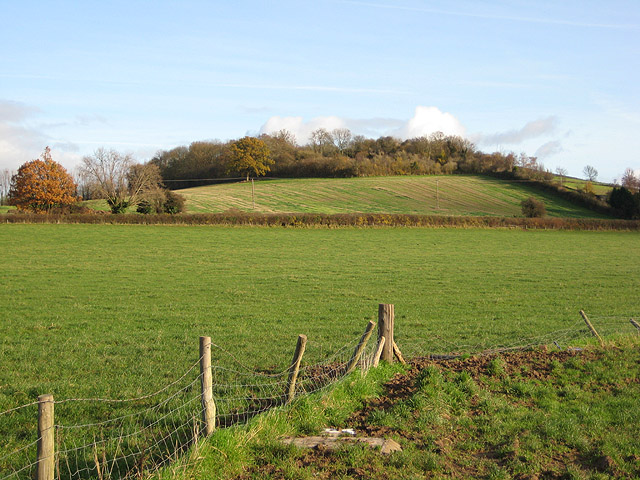
Western end of Sutton Walls

Sutton Walls Hillfort, in the parish of Sutton, Herefordshire, is an elongated ovoid Iron Age hill fort located 4 miles (6 km) north of the city of Hereford, England. It was added to the Sites and Monuments Record in 1988.

== History ==
The Sutton Walls hillfort dates back to the Iron Age. By 100 BC, defences began to be constructed in the form of a V-shaped ditch and an internal bank. The ditch and groundwork were then reinforced by revetting the banks with timber and stone. The reason for such work being done was because a larger community was establishing itself on top of the fort. The people in the settlement lived in wood and stone huts which were situated within the newly constructed defences. These very defences were strengthened around the year 25 AD, in the form of a large wooden perimeter wall enclosing the settlement atop the fort.

Archaeological digs have revealed that in around 48 AD, Sutton Walls was attacked by the Romans under the leadership of Ostorius Scapula and 24 of its inhabitants were slain and their bodies were thrown into the ditch. It is clear from examining the wounds of the skeletons of victims excavated that they were killed in such a conflict. Whilst some display clear arrow wound characteristics, others have clearly been decapitated. After the fort was conquered and its people either banished or put to the sword, the Romans themselves occupied it and did so till roughly the 3rd century. In this time the Romans greatly strengthened the fort's defences likely constructing a larger and more resilient perimeter wall to establish superiority over the local land and its people.

The fort is also regarded by many as being the location of one of the palaces of Offa of Mercia. According to the Anglo-Saxon Chronicle it was at Sutton Walls where Offa arranged Æthelberht II of East Anglia to be murdered in 794. Mediaeval sources tell how he was taken captive whilst visiting his future Mercian bride Ælfthryth and was then murdered and buried. In Richard of Cirencester's account of the murder, which cannot be substantiated, Offa's queen Cynethryth poisoned her husband's mind until he agreed to have his guest killed. Æthelberht was then bound and beheaded by a certain Grimbert and his body was unceremoniously disposed of. The medieval historian John Brompton's Chronicon describes how the king's detached head fell off a cart into a ditch where it was found, before it restored a blind man's sight. Posthumously Æthelberht was canonised and became the focus of cults in East Anglia and at Hereford Cathedral, where the shrine of the saintly king once existed.

In the mid-20th century, the site was used for dumping household and commercial waste of both solid and liquid varieties. Historian and broadcaster Michael Wood described it in 1979 as "the worst example of archeological conservation in Britain."
