= Dinmore Manor =

House in Dinmore, County of Herefordshire, England

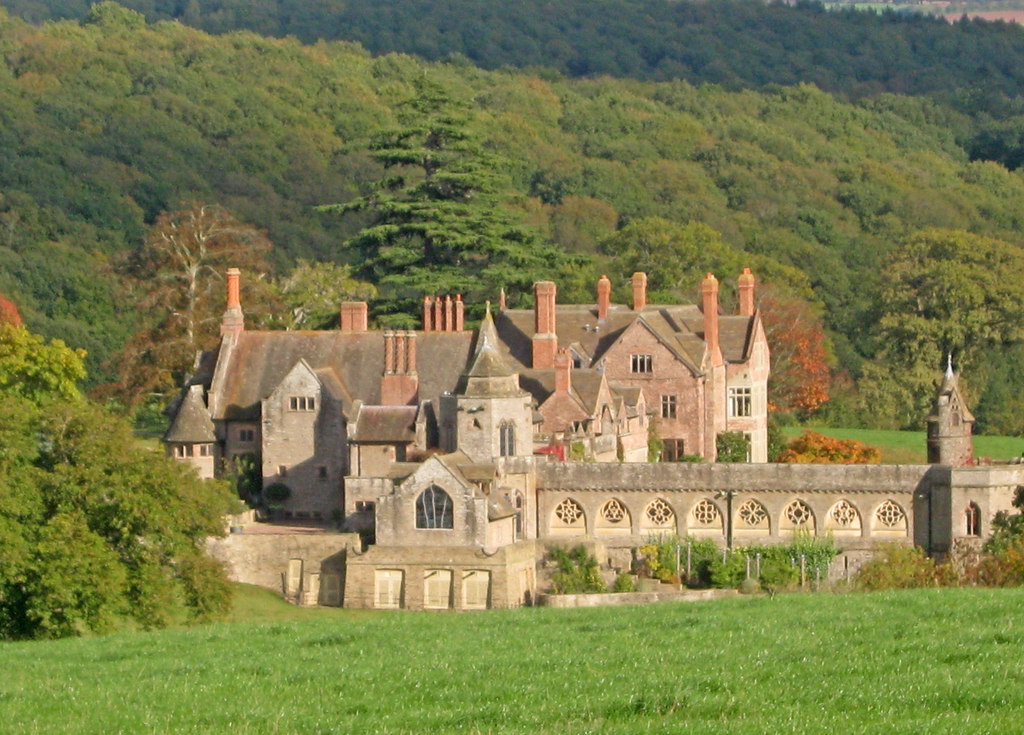

- Location within Herefordshire
- 52.1487°N 2.753°W
- Type: English country house
- Location: Dinmore, Herefordshire
- OS grid reference: SO 48591 50313

History
- Built: Medieval
- Rebuilt: 16th Century

Site notes
- Owner: Private

Listed Building – Grade II
- Official name: Dinmore Manor House
- Designated: 26 January 1967
- Reference no.: 1099393

Listed Building – Grade II*
- Official name: Chapel of St John of Jerusalem
- Designated: 15 July 1985
- Reference no.: 1348966

Dinmore Manor House is a large rural house in a well-wooded, hilly part of Herefordshire in the least populous parish of the county, Dinmore. It was substantially rebuilt in late 16th century, altered around 1830 and extended around the year 1928. The main house is a Grade II listed building. The outlying chapel is mostly medieval and is grade II* listed.

== Ownership and renovations ==
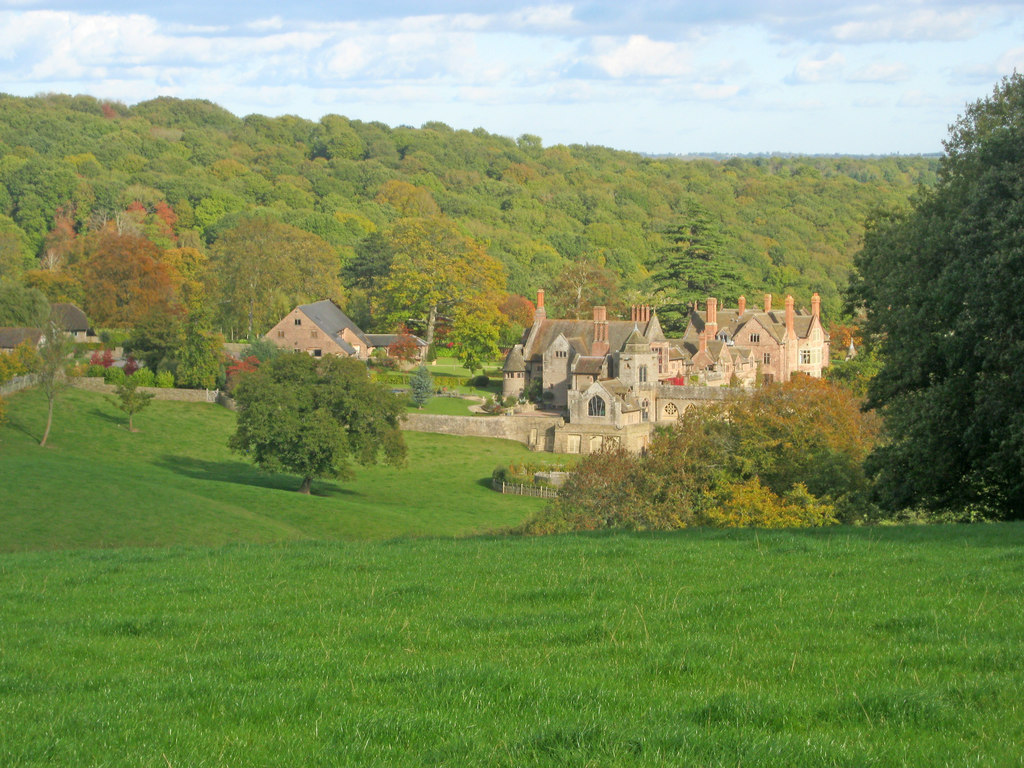
Dinmore Valley

The 19,167 square feet (1,780.7 m^{2}) Manor was owned by former Carphone Warehouse Director Martin Dawes, according to a June 2018 news item discussing the intended sale of the property. Dawes had acquired the Manor property in 1999 from the estate of Charles Ian Murray, a descendant of the former owner Richard Hollins Murray had who acquired the property in 1927.

In addition to the Manor House, the wider estate includes other residential properties, a magnificent shoot, an outstanding cattle breeding facility and a world class equestrian complex. A 2008 report stated that the Estate was closed to the public apart from occasional shoot days. The Estate also has a successful cattle breeding operation which specialises in pedigree Limousin cattle, owned by Paul Dawes and managed by Richard Bartle as of May 2020.

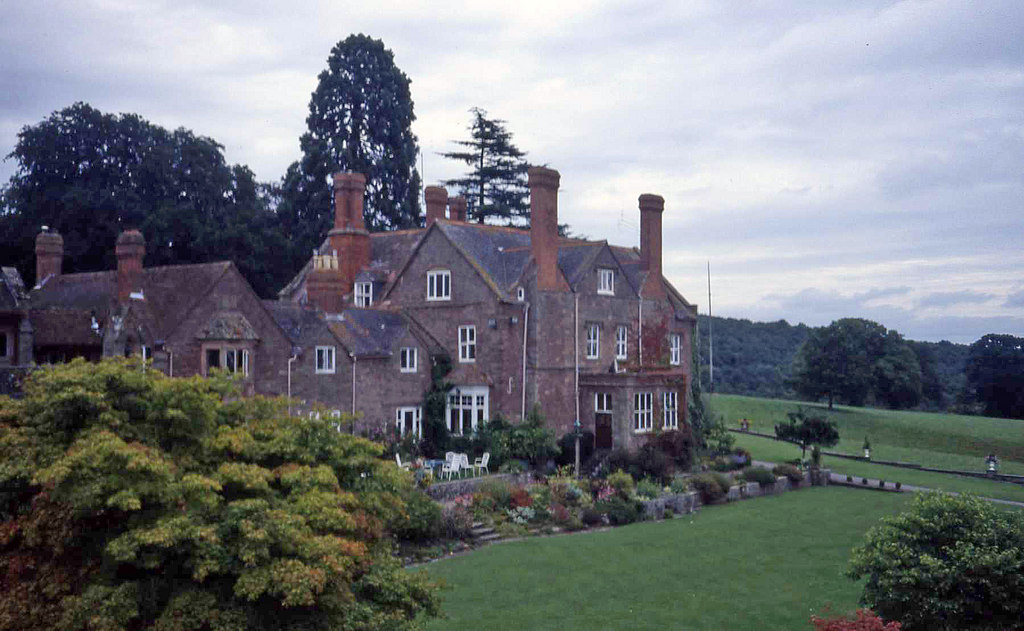
Dinmore Manor Cloister

A May 2019 report on the intended sale of the estate indicated that the property included the manor house and 19 restored houses and cottages that were let to tenants on a short-term basis. A major restoration of the manor was completed after 1999. Another report, in 2018, provided more specifics about the work completed by Hollins Murray in the 1920s and 1930s:

[He] spent a considerable sum on the house, including several ‘Gothic’ additions, and restored the 13th century chapel of the Knight Hospitallers of Jerusalem, as well as the cloisters leading from the chapel to the manor. (Murray was an Officer of the Order of St. John Jerusalem). The gardens were also re-landscaped with the creation of a new rock garden ... regularly opened to the public [after the restoration].

== Garden and woodland ==
At 165 metres (541 ft) above sea level, centred two-thirds up a many-miles long stepped east slope, the site has viewpoints over the abrupt north–south vale of the Lugg to the Malvern Hills. The garden has a 1,200-year-old Yew. The compact formal garden is not listed. It mainly comprises a rock garden, a group of Acers and a water garden.

== Chapel ==
The chapel to Saint John of Jerusalem remains on the site. Erected in the early part of the 12th century and formerly attached to the Commandery, it was rebuilt in 1370 in the Norman and Decorated architectural styles. A rectangular building, it consists of a chancel, a nave, a north porch and a western tower with spire. It was thoroughly restored in 1886 by Rev. Harris Fleming St John MA, chaplain (1878–1903), and filled with painted windows executed by himself. Stated to have had the privilege of sanctuary, it sits 50 people. The chapel has been Grade II listed since 1985 as "late C12 with subsequent alterations, restored 1886".

In May 2019, Sotheby's sold an "English chamber organ by Samuel Green, London, 1786", indicating that it had been removed from the Dinmore Manor chapel.

== Rooms ==
The building was developed from 1189 and was the Commandery of the Order of St John of Jerusalem. Thomas Docwra was Preceptor of the Order's holdings at Dinmore. The house (excluding its narrow rear extension) was mostly rebuilt in late 16th century, altered around 1830 and extended around the year 1928. The main house is a Grade II listed building

The house's music room is a hall projection with a vaulted ceiling and a Victorian Aeolian Pipe Organ that was moved to Dinmore from a home in Manchester.

The house overlooks the garden and lawn, and cloisters flank it to the right. The back wall of the cloisters features stained glass windows; coloured light streams onto the columns most late afternoons.

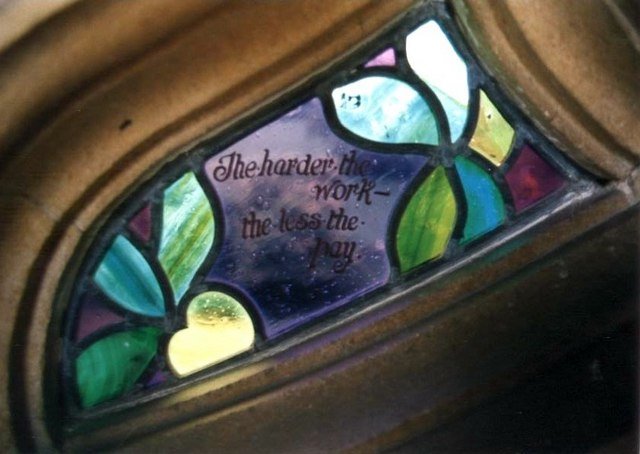
Stained glass window in the cloisters

The music room and the cloisters with stained glass windows are part of an expansion of the manor that was completed in 1936 by Richard Hollins Murray; the extension became Grade II listed in 1967.

In 1950 British Railways named a new GWR 7800 'Manor' Class steam locomotive, No.7820, after the manor. It is now preserved and operates on the Gloucestershire Warwickshire Railway.

In November 2026, works of art from Dinmore Manor were offered for sale at Sotheby's, London: they included bronze sculptures by Antoine-Louis Barye and other animaliers, fine Georgian and Victorian furniture, and Chinese lacquer work.

== Racehorses ==
Martin Dawes turned the modest pasture and arable fields into what had been described as "a world-class stud facility for show-jumping horses" and retained much of its woodland. For this, he may have spent around £14 to £15 million.
