= Marden, Herefordshire =

Village in Herefordshire, England

Coordinates: 52.12463°N 2.69962°W

Marden
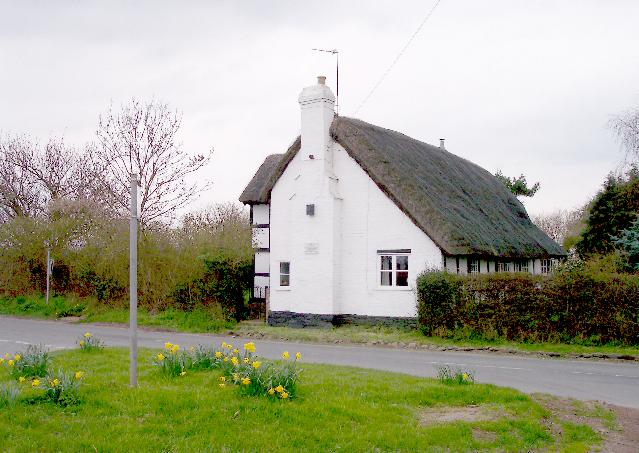
- The Old School House

- Flag

- Location within Herefordshire
- Unitary authority: Herefordshire
- Shire county: Herefordshire
- Region: West Midlands
- Country: England
- Sovereign state: United Kingdom
- Post town: Hereford
- Postcode district: HR1
- Police: West Mercia
- Fire: Hereford and Worcester
- Ambulance: West Midlands
- UK Parliament: North Herefordshire

Marden is a village and civil parish in the English county of Herefordshire.

Marden village is approximately 7 miles (11 km) due north of the city of Hereford, and is contiguous with the hamlets of Walker's Green and Paradise Green. The parish also includes the hamlet of Burmarsh to the south of the village. According to the historian Michael Lapidge, King Æthelberht II of East Anglia was murdered in the village in 794 on the order of Offa of Mercia.

The parish church, dedicated to St. Mary the Virgin, has been designated a Grade I listed building since 26 January 1967. The earliest part of the present building dates back to the 13th century, but the church has its origins in the 8th century . It is situated on the banks of the River Lugg.

The Marches Way long-distance footpath passes through the village and, heading south, then crosses Sutton Walls Hill Fort.

== Economy ==
In 2009, a company growing, packing, importing and exporting soft fruit and asparagus was based in the village, and employed more than 2,400 people, predominantly Romanians and Bulgarians, to work on its farms in Herefordshire and Kent.

== Notable residents ==
The cattle breeder, Richard de Quincey, lived in Marden from 1922 until his death in 1965.
