= Pipe and Lyde =

Village in Herefordshire, England

Coordinates: 52.092°N 2.726°W

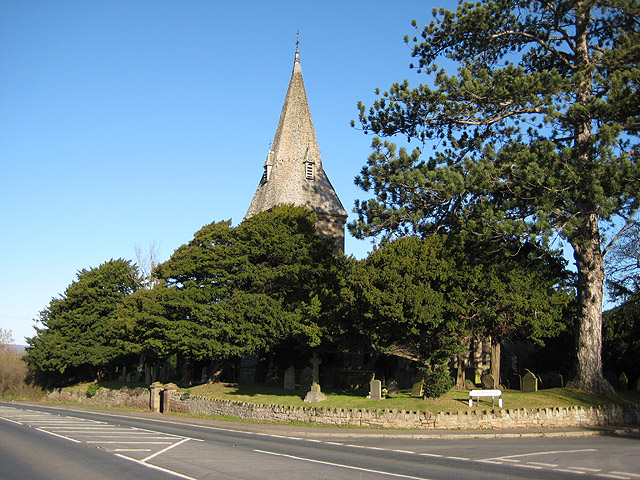
- St Peter's Church at Lower Lyde

- Location within Herefordshire
- Population: 344 (2011 Census)
- OS grid reference: SO500444
- Unitary authority: Herefordshire
- Shire county: Herefordshire
- Region: West Midlands
- Country: England
- Sovereign state: United Kingdom
- Post town: Hereford
- Postcode district: HR4
- Police: West Mercia
- Fire: Hereford and Worcester
- Ambulance: West Midlands
- UK Parliament: North Herefordshire

Pipe and Lyde is a village and civil parish in Herefordshire, England. The parish includes the village of Pipe and Lyde and the hamlets of Lower Lyde and Upper Lyde. The population of the civil parish as taken at the 2011 census was 344. Parts of the church of St Peter date from the 13th century including the south doorway which includes Transitional moulding. James Honeyman-Scott (1956-1982), the Pretenders guitarist, is buried in the churchyard.
