= Hope under Dinmore =

Village in Herefordshire, England

Coordinates: 52.17°N 2.72°W

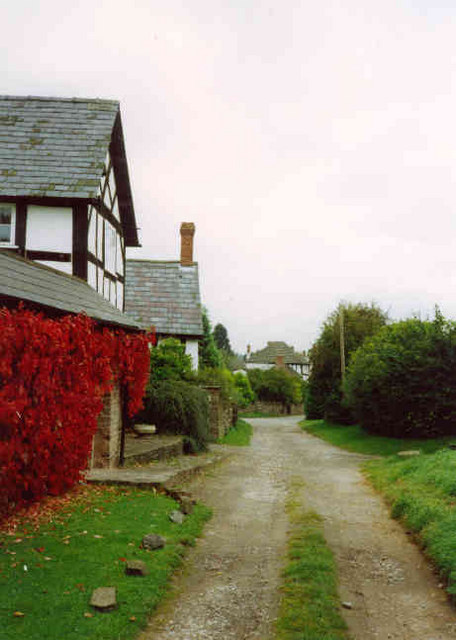
- Hope under Dinmore - the old village

- Location within Herefordshire
- Population: 412
- Unitary authority: Herefordshire
- Ceremonial county: Herefordshire
- Region: West Midlands
- Country: England
- Sovereign state: United Kingdom
- Post town: Leominster
- Postcode district: HR6
- Dialling code: 01568
- Police: West Mercia
- Fire: Hereford and Worcester
- Ambulance: West Midlands
- UK Parliament: North Herefordshire

Hope under Dinmore is a village and civil parish in Herefordshire, England. The village is on the A49 road, 4 miles (6 km) south of Leominster and 9 miles (14 km) north of Hereford, and on the Welsh Marches railway line. The railway passes under Dinmore Hill through the split-level 1,051-yard (961 m) long Dinmore Tunnel. Dinmore railway station closed in 1958, but the line remains open. The church has a tower and is dedicated to Saint Mary the Virgin.

The parish had a population in mid-2010 of 343, increasing to 412 at the 2011 Census.

The 15th-century Hampton Court Castle lies east of the village. It was built in 1472 by Sir Rowland Lenthall who had distinguished himself at the Battle of Agincourt, taking so many prisoners that he was able to fund the completion of the building. It was later the ancestral home of the Earl Coningsby, and in the nineteenth century, passed into the hands of Richard Arkwright.

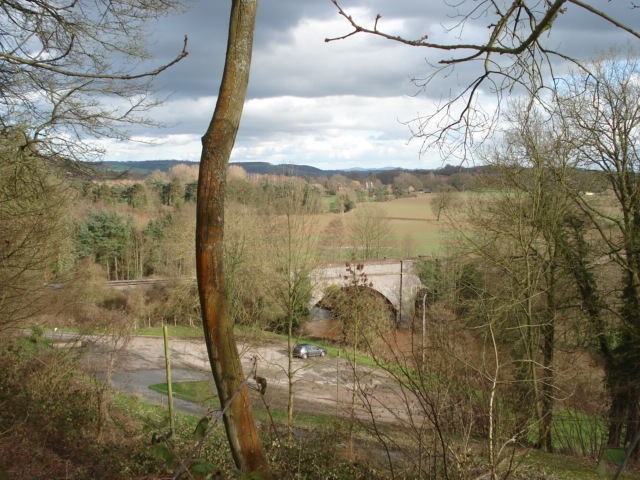
The River Lugg crossed by the Welsh Marches Line near Dinmore railway station.

Dinmore Manor, in a valley south-west of the hill, was founded as a preceptory of the Knights of St John of Jerusalem. The ruins are still visible on the hillside above the village. It is the private residence of mobile phone tycoon Martin Dawes and no longer open to the general public.

Winsley House, in the west of the parish, is a Grade II listed 14th-century farmhouse with later additions.

Most of the population of the village is centred in the housing estate called Cherrybrook Close, but the village extends up two roads, one of which leads to Westhope Common. The industrial and business park of Marlbrook is within the north-east of the parish, and partly in the neighbouring parish of Newton. This is where the Cadbury company has a factory that processes 180 million litres of fresh milk, 56,000 tonnes of sugar and 13,000 tonnes of cocoa liquor each year to produce milk chocolate crumb for the manufacture of milk chocolate.
