= Hampton Court Castle =

Castellated country house in Herefordshire, England

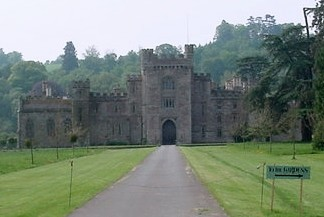
- Hampton Court Castle seen from North

- Location within Herefordshire

General information
- Architectural style: Gothic, Gothic Revival
- Location: Hope under Dinmore, England
- Coordinates: 52°10′3.57″N 2°42′14.91″W
- Construction started: 1427

Hampton Court Castle, also known as Hampton Court or Hampton Castle, is a castellated country house in the English county of Herefordshire. The house is in the parish of Hope under Dinmore 4 miles (6.4 km) south of Leominster and is a Grade I listed building, which is the highest category of architecture in the statutory protection scheme.

The castle and grounds can be visited by the public and are also available as a venue for weddings and other events.

== History ==
Hampton Court dates back from 1427. Sir Rowland Lenthall had built the original house on an estate which had been granted to him some years previously on his marriage to the king's cousin Margaret Fitzalan, a daughter of Richard FitzAlan, 4th Earl of Arundel. Sir Rowland's house was a quadrangular courtyard house and has retained this basic form. In other ways, the house has been significantly altered.

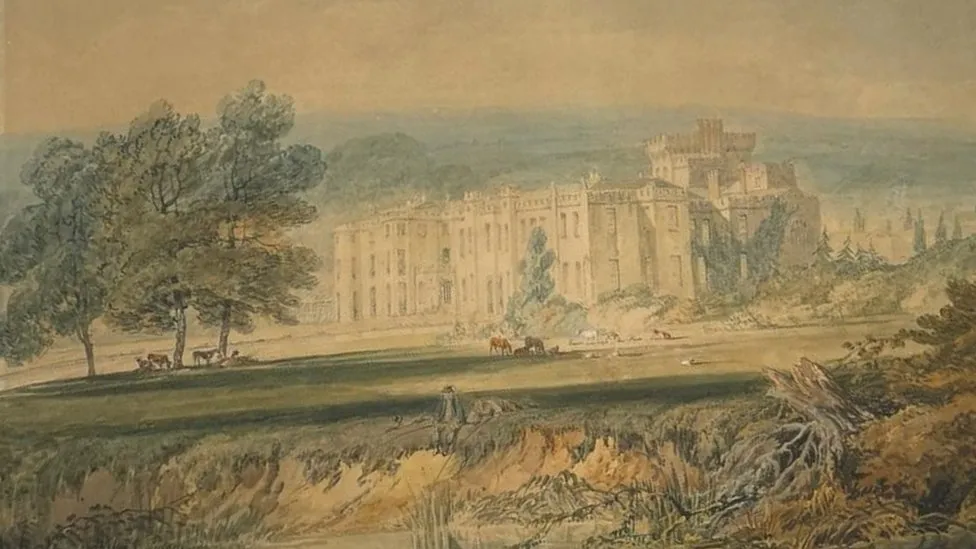
Hampton Court, Herefordshire by J.M.W. Turner (cropped)

The house was painted at least twice by J.M.W. Turner.

== Successive owners ==
It was owned by the noble Coningsby family from 1510 until 1781, when it was inherited by George Capel, Viscount Malden, son of the 4th Earl of Essex. The 4th Earl's first wife was Frances Hanbury Williams, the daughter of Charles Hanbury Williams of Coldbroke and granddaughter of Thomas Coningsby, 1st Earl Coningsby. The 5th Earl changed his name to Capel-Coningsby and remodelled the building to the designs of the architect James Wyatt.

Historic England reports that the castle was "altered early C18 by Colen Campbell for Lord Coningsby and remodelled and restored in the early C19 by Sir Jeffrey Wyatville for Richard Arkwright".

In 1810 the estate was purchased by John Arkwright, the grandson of the inventor and industrialist Richard Arkwright.

Some of the original oak panelling was taken probably during the 17th century to Wickton Court, a grand house near Leominster and remains a feature of its living room.

The house was remodelled in the 1830s and 1840s to restore a castle-like layout, exterior and decoration, reversing earlier attempts to make it appear more regular and domestic.

It was sold by John Stanhope Arkwright in 1910 followed by a gradual succession of conveyances. Between 1924 and 1972 it was the seat of Viscount Hereford and was bought by American businessman Robert Van Kampen in 1994. He died in 1999. The formal gardens were opened with a celebration by the family in the year 2000, where the Indiana Wesleyan University Chorale was featured as a sacred choir and some members as a small madrigal choir. Hampton Court Castle and grounds were sold by the Van Kampen family in 2006.

In January 2016, the house was for sale at the price of £12M, having been advertised for sale for more than a year at prices of up to £16M. It was described as part of a 935 acres (3.78 km^{2}) property with 26 bedrooms and 25 bathrooms. It also includes a conservatory designed by Joseph Paxton.

As of 2025, the castle is now solely used as a wedding venue. The gardens (Hampton Gardens) are still open to the public every day throughout the season.

== Gardens ==
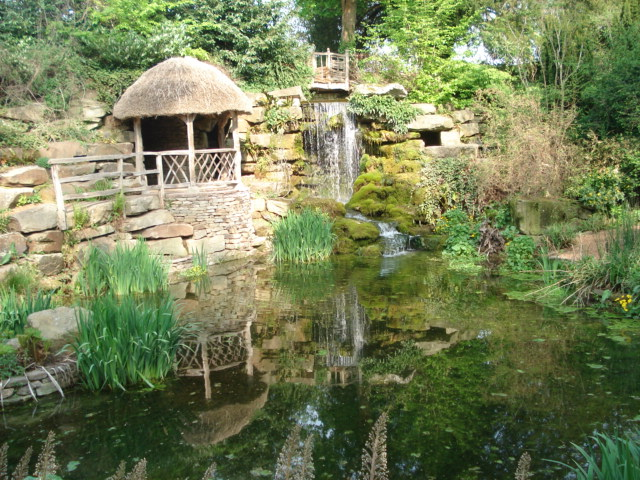
The sunken garden, with waterfall

The gardens are a particular feature, and include an organically managed kitchen garden, as well as a maze, a secret tunnel, Dutch garden, island pavilions and a 150-year-old wisteria arch.

Hampton Court has a 12-acre (4.9 ha) garden which was largely created by the Van Kampens and is open to the public throughout the summer months, and now offers special events such as outdoor theatre productions, small concerts and family days out.

The house (empty) and grounds featured extensively in the first season of the 1970s BBC television series Survivors, filmed in the spring and summer of 1975.
