= Dinmore Tunnel =

Railway tunnels in England

Coordinates: 52.15699°N 2.71555°W

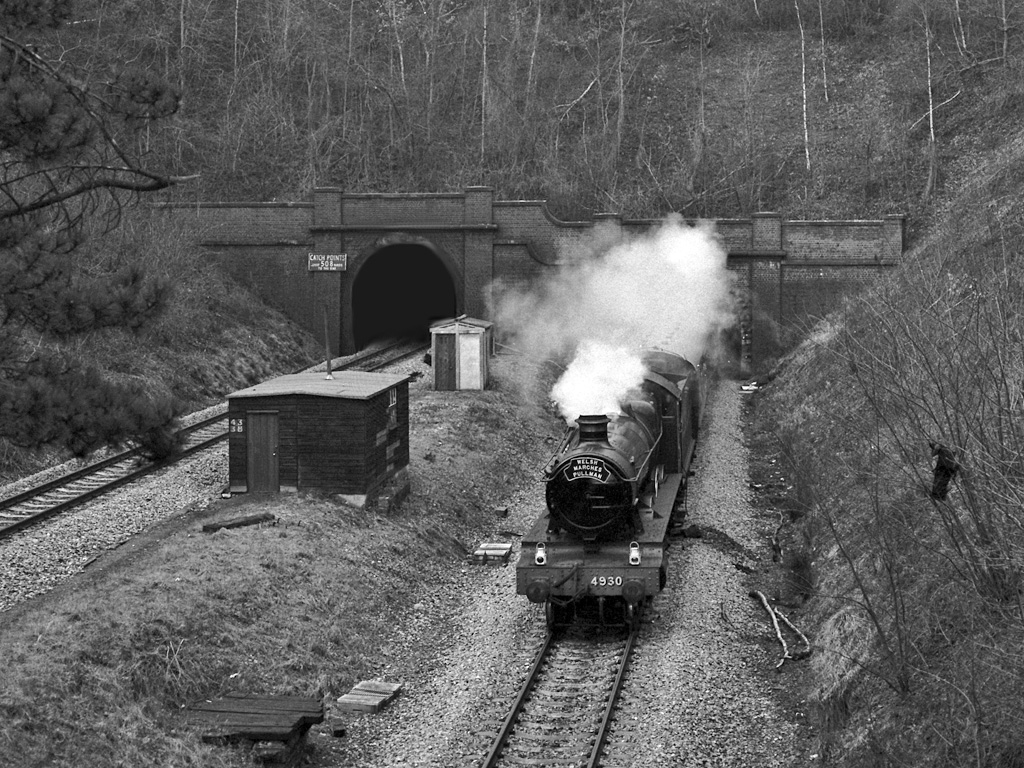
GWR 4900 Class 4930 Hagley Hall emerging from the tunnel on 26 February 1983 on the Welsh Marches Line.

Dinmore Tunnel is the name given to two railway tunnels located on the former Shrewsbury and Hereford Railway (S&HR) line between Hereford station and Leominster station. The first tunnel (currently the 'up' tunnel) was built in 1853, with the second tunnel (the 'down' tunnel) being added in 1891. Both are still in use and are jointly the 15th longest tunnels on the former Great Western Railway. To the south of the tunnel was Dinmore railway station, which closed in 1958. They are located just south to the village of Hope Under Dinmore and tunnels under Queen's Wood Country Park & Arboretum.

== Construction ==
When the S&HR was opened in November 1863, it was a single track throughout. However, all infrastructure was made wide enough to accommodate twin tracks throughout apart from the Dinmore Tunnel which, owing to the uncertain rock strata, was left as a single bore. The engineer, Mr Pollard, recommended that if the line were to be doubled, then a second tunnel should be constructed. When the S&HR became a joint line of the London & North Western and the Great Western and West Midland Railways, they pursued the second tunnel option.

The tunnels are split-level - the track on the up line to Leominster being at a higher level than the down line to Hereford, both are 1,054 yards (964 m) long and the line speed through both is 80 miles per hour (130 km/h).
