= River Lugg =

River in Powys, Wales and Herefordshire, England

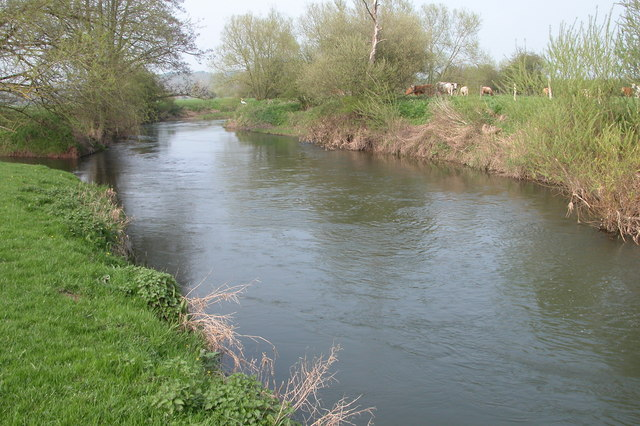
- The Lugg at Hampton Bishop
- Native name: Afon Llugwy (Welsh)

Location
- Country: Wales, England
- Counties: Powys, Herefordshire
- Settlements: Llangynllo, Presteigne, Leominster, Hope under Dinmore, Bodenham, Marden, Lugwardine

Physical characteristics
- Source: Llangynllo
  - location: Radnor Forest, Radnorshire, Wales
  - coordinates: 52°21′29″N 3°12′20″W
  - elevation: 497 m (1,631 ft)
- Mouth: confluence with River Wye
  - location: Mordiford, Herefordshire, England
  - coordinates: 52°01′52″N 2°38′10″W
  - elevation: 46 m (151 ft)
- Length: 63 mi (101 km)

Basin features
- Tributaries
  - left: River Frome
  - right: River Arrow

The River Lugg (Welsh: Afon Llugwy) rises near Llangynllo in Powys, Wales. From its source, it flows through the border town of Presteigne and then into Herefordshire, England. It meets its main tributary, the River Arrow, to the south of Leominster, then flows into the River Wye downstream of Hereford at Mordiford, around 63 miles (101 km) from its source. Its name comes from a Welsh root, and means "bright stream".

As it passes through the countryside, it is crossed by a number of bridges, many of which are listed structures. Lugg Bridge at Lugwardine and the bridge at Mordiford with its associated causeway both date from the 14th century. The river at Leominster was altered significantly in the 1960s, when it was diverted to the south and then along the course of the Leominster and Kington Railway around the northern edge of the town, as part of a flood defence scheme. In the past, it was important for milling, supplying power to nearly one third of the mills in Herefordshire at the time of the Domesday Book. There are a few mills left, and some obvious mill sites, but many of the mills below Leominster were bought up and their weirs demolished as part of a scheme to make the river navigable in the 1690s. This was not a success, as the water levels dropped creating shoals, and in the 1720s, some of the weirs were reinstated, with pound locks to enable boats to bypass them. Navigation up to Leominster was for a time possible, although it was never hugely successful, and ceased in the 1860s, once railways had been built in the area.

The river was a free navigation as a result of powers obtained in an act of Parliament, the Rivers Wye and Lugg Navigation Act 1695 (7 & 8 Will. 3. c. 14), but in 2002, the Environment Agency became the navigation authority following the passing of the Wye Navigation Order 2002 (SI 2002/1998). This reaffirmed the right of navigation on the river, but prohibited the building of locks and weirs, and so most boating is by canoes and kayaks. The river is also used for fishing, as it has good populations of wild brown trout and grayling. Water quality of the river system is moderate, although some of its tributaries have poor water quality, and some bad. In common with many rivers, the chemical quality changed from good to fail in 2019, following the introduction of testing for chemicals not previously included in the quality assessment. The whole of the river is a Site of Special Scientific Interest, and since 2003, a policy of building fish passes where there are weirs has led to significant improvements to the presence of migratory fish in the river.

== Course ==
The River Lugg rises at two locations on Pool Hill, to the north-west of Llangunllo, close to the 1,600-foot (490 m) contour, and is joined by several other streams as it descends rapidly. It is crossed by the Heart of Wales Line, between Llanbister Road and Llangynllo stations, before passing under the first of four bridges that carry the B4356 road over it. Already it has dropped below the 820-foot (250 m) contour. It turns to the east to reach Greenstreet Bridge on the B4356, and then to the south-east to pass the village of Llangunllo. Just beyond it is Llangunllo Bridge, again on the B4356. Mynachdy moated enclosure, a well-preserved medieval moated homestead is situated on the north bank, after which the river turns to the south to pass the grade I listed Monaughty House, dating from the 16th and 17th centuries. It is one of the oldest stone buildings in Radnorshire, and renovation in the 1990s saw many of its later 19th century modifications removed.

Next it is crossed by the A488 Penybont to Shrewsbury road, after which a tributary joins on the south bank. Castell Foel-Allt, the remains of a medieval motte and bailey castle is located on the north bank, and is a scheduled monument. It passes under Whitton Bridge on the B4357 road, and is joined by Cascob Brook on its south bank. Almost opposite is a short section of Offa's Dyke, a long linear earthworks which roughly defined much of the border between England and Wales. After a fourth crossing by the B4356, it arrives on the outskirts of Presteigne. It is crossed by the narrow, single-arched Old Boultibrooke Bridge, probably dating from the 18th century, which has been bypassed by a new bridge constructed in 1932, just to its east. After it is joined by Norton Brook and the English/Welsh border, the river continues along the northern edge of Presteigne, passing the Old Mill, formerly known as New Mill House. Close by is the weir which once powered the mill. Lugg Bridge, the first of several with this name, carries Ford Street over the river, and has three segmental arches. The basic structure dates from the 17th century, but it has been heavily modified.

Continuing eastwards, the river comes to Rosser's Bridge, where the border turns to the south, and the river is wholly in Herefordshire. Hindwell Brook joins on the south bank, and the course turns to the north-east. Another tributary, Lime Brook, flows southwards to join the north bank. Just before Lyepole Bridge, the river passes a castle mound, which was once a motte castle, founded by Hugh Mortimer in the mid-12th century. As the river turns to the south-east, a large weir directs water into a mill leat, which runs on the north side of the main channel to Aymestrey Mill, a grist mill built in the 1860s. Most of the machinery is still in situ, and the wheel now powers a printing press. The A4110 road bridge crosses the river and the mill tailrace, and as the river turns to the south, a similar weir creates a leat to the west of the river. Mortimer's Cross Water Mill is located further to the south, fed by another weir. It is 89 feet (27 m) long and a 220-yard (200 m) leat feeds the mill, which has three sets of stones. It was a paper mill until the 1830s, and then became a grain mill. New machinery was installed in 1870 and it produced animal feed until the 1940s. It is unusual in that it was designed to be operated by one man. It has been restored and on days when it is open to the public, it can be seen in operation.

To the south of the mill is Lugg Bridge, consisting of three arches, two spanning the river and a third spanning the mill tailrace. The north face dates from 1771, when the bridge was built, while the south face dates from 1938, when it was widened. At Lugg Green, Kingsland is another Lugg Bridge, and after a series of weirs, the river arrives on the northern edge of Leominster. A leat to Crowards Mill, now disconnected from the main river, was formerly the main channel of the Lugg, with much of the flow passing over a weir into the Kenwater. The Lugg served Osborne Mill, Marsh Mill and a third corn mill, before rejoining the Kenwater within the town. Pinsley Brook ran through the town just to the south of Kenwater, to power Pinsley Mill, another corn mill just to the north of Leominster railway station and joined the Lugg below Eaton Bridge. There were once 19 bridges in Leominster, most of them crossing the Lugg, Kenwater or Pinsley Brook. The river system within the town was radically reworked in the 1960s, as part of a flood alleviation scheme. The Lugg continued southwards along the course of the Kenwater, to a new weir close to the former course of the Leominster and Kington Railway. The Kenwater passed over the weir, while a new channel was cut for the Lugg, following the course of the railway. It then passed under the railway to meet the Ridgemoor Brook, and under Ridgemoor Bridge, a single span that dates from 1815 but was widened in 1940, which carries the A44 road. Below the bridge, it is joined by Cheaton Brook, and then rejoins its original course. The Pinsley Brook was diverted into the Kenwater to the west of the town in 1968 and its original course filled in. Parts of it had been culverted some years before that.

The Lugg then passes under Mosaic Bridge, constructed for the A49 bypass in 1988. It takes its name from a mosaic on the southern pier which was designed by young people at the time of its construction, and has since been restored. Eaton Bridge, carrying the A44, has three arches and was built in the 16th century, with modifications made in the 18th century. Near Eaton Hall is another three-arched bridge, dating from the 19th century, where the eastern arch crosses a leat. The river is then joined by the River Arrow on its western bank, and was crossed by the Worcester, Bromyard and Leominster Railway until it was closed in 1964. As the river passes under Ford Bridge at Ford, the B4361 road, the railway and the A49 road are squeezed into a narrow gap between it and War Hill to the west. The next bridge downstream is Hampton Court Bridge at Hope under Dinmore, a single span which carries the A417. It may have been designed by Sir Jeffry Wyattville for the Arkwright family who lived at Hampton Court, a grade I listed house built between 1427 and 1436 and modified in the 18th century. The river forms the western and southern boundaries of the associated parkland and the building was remodelled and restored by Wyattville for Richard Arkwright at that time. The Humber Brook forms the eastern boundary of the estate, and joins the Lugg on its north bank.

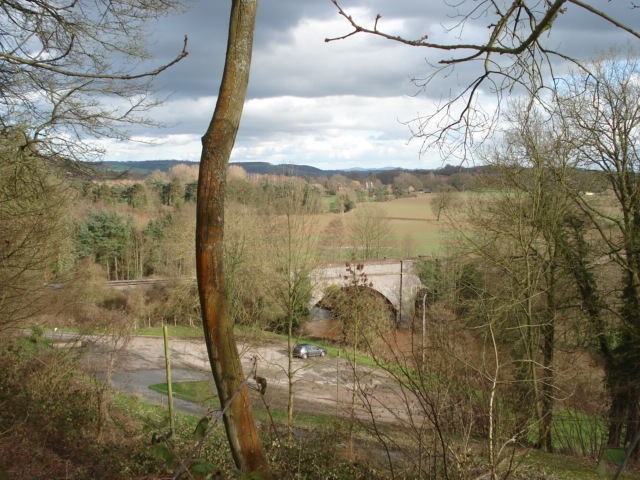
Railway bridge over the Lugg at the southern end of Dinmore Tunnel on the Welsh Marches Line

The river continues to the east and then turns to the south. At Bodenham is the single-span Bodenham Bridge, dating from 1816, after which the river turns to the west. It is crossed by two bridges carrying the Welsh Marches Line just to the south of the twin tunnels through Dinmore Hill. Dinmore railway station was located on the north bank, until it closed in 1958. The river crosses back under the railway a little further to the south. At Marden a hump-backed bridge with four spans crosses the river. It is grade II* listed and the Ordnance Survey call it Laystone Bridge, while English Heritage call it Leystone Bridge. Wellington Brook joins on the west bank of the river, opposite the grade I listed church of St Mary, Marden, which dates from the 13th and 14th centuries. As it approaches Moreton Bridge, the channel splits into two, enclosing an island, and the three-span bridge crosses both channels. It dates from the 16th or 17th century, but was altered in the mid-19th century. The bridge is to the east of the village of Moreton on Lugg. After Wergins Bridge, Morton Brook joins on the west bank, and the river is crossed by a railway bridge carrying the Cotswold Line.

Lugg Bridge at Lugwardine dates from the 14th century, and was repaired in 1409 and 1464. It has three arches, and was widened in the 1960s, when the south side was largely rebuilt. The Little Lugg joins from the east near the bridge, which was the location of corn mills in 1903, when a structure spanned the river to the south of the bridge. A little further downstream is Lugwardine Bridge, consisting of three spans dating from the early 17th century. It was widened in 1824 and altered in the 20th century. After the River Frome joins on the east bank, the final bridge connects Mordiford on the east bank to Hampton Bishop. The bridge dates from the 14th century, and was widened in the 16th century. It consists of two main arches, through which the Lugg flows, with two flood arches and a causeway containing five more arches to the west of the main arches. The causeway was widened on the upstream side in the 20th century. To the west of the causeway are the remains of a pound lock. The walls of the chamber survive, although they are in poor condition. The Pentaloe Brook joins the river on its east bank just below the bridge, and then the Lugg joins the River Wye.

== History ==
At the time of the Domesday Book, which recorded details of a survey of the land in 1086, the Lugg was an important river for milling. Some 80 mills were recorded in the county of Herefordshire, and of those, around one third were located in the valley of the Lugg, some on tributaries and others on the main river. In addition, those on the Lugg were valued considerably higher than those elsewhere, with an average value of 15 shillings and 4 pence, compared to 6 shillings and 7 pence for mills on other rivers. At that time, the hay meadows on the banks of the Lugg were the largest in the county, and the valley produced large crops of hay and corn. At least four of the sites were recorded as having fulling mills subsequently, but none were recorded when a survey of the river was made in 1697.

Between the 17th and 19th centuries, four acts of Parliament were passed which specifically named the River Lugg in their titles, but the middle two had the most effect on the river. The first, the Rivers Wye and Lugg Navigation Act 1662 (14 Cha. 2. c. 15 Pr.), was passed on 19 May 1662, entitled An Act for the making navigable the Rivers Wye and Lugg, and the Rivers and Brooks running into the same, in the counties of Hereford, Gloucester and Monmouth. Sir William Sandys was appointed to carry out the work, which involved building weirs and flash locks to maintain water levels, but his previous experience on the Warwickshire Avon did not fit the Wye, which was a much steeper and faster-flowing river, and the work was abandoned by about 1668, before any work had been started on the Lugg.

The second act of Parliament was obtained on 17 March 1695, the Rivers Wye and Lugg Navigation Act 1695 (7 & 8 Will. 3. c. 14), entitled An Act for making navigable the Rivers of Wye and Lugg, in the county of Hereford. One important effect of this act was that it re-established both rivers as free navigations, for it contained the clause:

Therefore be it enacted that the rivers Wye and Lugg may be henceforth accounted, deemed and taken to be free and common rivers for all to make use of for carrying and conveying of all passenger goods, wares and commodities by boats, barges, lighters and other vessels whatsoever.

On many of Britain's lowland rivers, there was an uneasy relationship between use of the water for milling, which required weirs to be built, and navigation, which required freedom of movement along the waterway. The Rivers Wye and Lugg Navigation Act 1695 took a radical approach, allowing the weirs to be bought and demolished, with funding for the purchases to be raised by a rate on the county of Herefordshire. On the Wye, some of the weirs were associated with fishing, but on the Lugg, all of them were connected with milling. Details of them have survived, because a comprehensive survey was carried out by an anonymous author, thought to be Daniel Dennell, who had previously worked on the Exeter Canal, and Dennell's document was acquired by the British Museum in 1856. The survey listed ten mills between Lugg Bridge, Leominster and the junction with the Wye, but this was probably the number of wheels or pairs of millstones, rather than the number of buildings where milling occurred. The annual value of each mill was to be established, and the price to buy the mill and weir was then fixed at 16 times that value.

It is not clear exactly what work was done, since the relevant sheets from the accounts are missing, but a lot of money was spent. Locks may have been put into some of the weirs; this was certainly true at Tidnor, and may have also been the case at the confluence with the Wye, at Mordiford, Hampton Court, and some other sites. Several bridges were altered, by breaking one of the arches and constructing a timber drawbridge or later a raised arch. Overall, the policy of removing the weirs was not a success, as it meant that water levels dropped significantly, and navigation was hindered by shoals, which prevented boats from passing. A third act of Parliament, the Rivers Wye and Lugg Navigation Act 1726 (13 Geo. 1. c. 34) was obtained on 15 May 1727, which openly stated that destroying the weirs had been a mistake, and allowed the trustees to reinstate them, with associated locks. Neither the minutes nor the accounts for this phase of the work have survived.

Thomas Chinn, a millwright from Tewkesbury, was employed to build locks around 1748, after money was raised by subscriptions in Leominster. He was later indicted for building locks against four bridges, but this charge may have been malicious. When the case was heard, he was only fined sixpence for each bridge and was not required to remove the locks. There are known to have been locks at twelve sites between Leominster and the Wye, at Volca Meadow, Ford Bridge, Hampton Court, Bodenham Mill, Kings Mill, Moreton Bridge, Wergins Bridge, Sherwick Mill, Lugg Bridge, Tidnor, Mordiford and the confluence. Some of these may have been half locks or flash locks, but some were definitely pound locks with two sets of gates, and of the three locks still in existence in 1906, both Tidnor and Mordiford were pound locks, but no clear evidence for a second set of gates at Lugg Bridge has been found. Barges on the river were hauled by teams of men. A fourth act of Parliament was obtained, the Wye and Lugg Navigation and Horse Towing-path Act 1809 (49 Geo. 3. c. lxxviii), to allow horse towing paths to be constructed on the Wye and the Lugg, but there is no evidence that such a path was ever started on the Lugg.

The arrival of railways in the area in the 1850s led to the winding up of the Wye and Lugg Towing Path Company, and use of both the Lugg and the Wye for navigation ceased soon afterwards. Some traffic may have used the lower 5 miles (8 km) of the Lugg up to Lugg Bridge until about 1860.

As a result of the Rivers Wye and Lugg Navigation Act 1695, the Lugg was a free navigation, but in 1995 the National Rivers Authority sought to apply bylaws to both the Wye and the Lugg. Their case was taken to the High Court, and was continued by the Environment Agency, which superseded the National Rivers Authority later that year. This action eventually led to the granting of the Wye Navigation Order 2002 (SI 2002/1998), which reaffirmed the right of navigation on both rivers, appointed the Environment Agency as the navigation authority for the rivers, but prohibited the construction of weirs and locks. Most use of the river is now by canoes and kayaks, although it is still sometimes used by small boats but can be very dangerous when in flood. In February 2020, it was one of several rivers with severe flood warnings following the impact of Storm Dennis.

== Recreation ==
The river is popular with canoeists who have undisputed rights of navigation. However travelling from Leominster to Hereford is challenged by numerous fallen trees obstructing the river. It is a good fishing river, with populations of wild brown trout and grayling.

== Environment ==
The Environment Agency measure the water quality of the river systems in England. Each is given an overall ecological status, which may be one of five levels: high, good, moderate, poor and bad. There are several components that are used to determine this, including biological status, which looks at the quantity and varieties of invertebrates, angiosperms and fish. Chemical status, which compares the concentrations of various chemicals against known safe concentrations, is rated good or fail. Equivalent data for the Welsh section is not readily available.

The water quality of the River Lugg system was as follows in 2019.

Section	Ecological Status	Chemical Status	Length	Catchment	Channel
Hindwell Bk - conf Knobley Bk to conf R Lugg	Moderate	Fail	9.2 miles (14.8 km)	8.53 square miles (22.1 km^{2})	
Lime Bk - source to conf R Lugg	Good	Fail	8.4 miles (13.5 km)	9.22 square miles (23.9 km^{2})	
Pinsley Bk - source to conf R Lugg	Poor	Fail	7.0 miles (11.3 km)	8.86 square miles (22.9 km^{2})	
Ridgemoor Bk - source to conf R Lugg	Moderate	Fail	7.1 miles (11.4 km)	13.46 square miles (34.9 km^{2})	
Cheaton Bk - source to conf R Lugg	Poor	Fail	7.8 miles (12.6 km)	15.21 square miles (39.4 km^{2})	
Lugg - conf Norton Bk to conf R Arrow	Moderate	Fail	27.8 miles (44.7 km)	26.09 square miles (67.6 km^{2})	
Arrow - conf Gilwern Bk to conf R Lugg	Moderate	Fail	24.4 miles (39.3 km)	27.32 square miles (70.8 km^{2})	
Humber Bk - source to conf R Lugg	Moderate	Fail	11.0 miles (17.7 km)	14.95 square miles (38.7 km^{2})	
Bodenham Bk - source to conf R Lugg	Bad	Fail	1.3 miles (2.1 km)	3.91 square miles (10.1 km^{2})	
Wellington Bk - source to conf R Lugg	Poor	Fail	6.7 miles (10.8 km)	11.42 square miles (29.6 km^{2})	
Moreton Bk - source to conf R Lugg	Bad	Fail	5.1 miles (8.2 km)	8.09 square miles (21.0 km^{2})	
Little Lugg - source to conf R Lugg	Moderate	Fail	9.3 miles (15.0 km)	12.27 square miles (31.8 km^{2})	
Frome - conf Tedstone Bk to conf R Lugg	Moderate	Fail	18.2 miles (29.3 km)	25.90 square miles (67.1 km^{2})	
Pentaloe Bk - source to conf R Wye	Poor	Fail	2.4 miles (3.9 km)	4.51 square miles (11.7 km^{2})	
Lugg - conf R Arrow to conf R Wye	Moderate	Fail	27.1 miles (43.6 km)	35.26 square miles (91.3 km^{2})	

Like most rivers in the UK, the chemical status changed from good to fail in 2019, due to the presence of polybrominated diphenyl ethers (PBDE), perfluorooctane sulphonate (PFOS) and mercury compounds, none of which had previously been included in the assessment.

From its source to its mouth, the entire length of the river has been a designated Site of Special Scientific Interest (SSSI) since 2 February 1995. It received the designation because it was one of the best examples of a clay river, with its chemistry changing from nutrient-poor in the upper reaches to naturally nutrient-rich in the lower reaches. As well as supporting several rare plant communities and otters, it also provides habitat for Atlantic stream crayfish, Atlantic Salmon, Bullhead and Twaite Shad. Below Eaton, the river is a designated Special Area of Conservation (SAC). During the 1980s and 1990s, there was a sharp drop in the number of migrating salmon on the river, as access was impeded by weirs. From 2003, a number of fish passes were constructed at these locations, and a survey in 2013 found that numbers of salmon in the river and in the tributary River Arrow had increased dramatically. The survey also found that brown trout had benefitted from the improvements, as their numbers had also increased. Some of the work was funded by the Lugg and Arrow Fisheries Association.

The Eaton Angling Club, which was established in 1877, manages the fishing rights on 1.2 miles (2 km) of the river near Eaton Hall. Every year since 1955, they had stocked the river with 500 to 600 rainbow trout, but in 2009, some of their stocking was with triploid brown trout, infertile females which cannot inter-breed with the wild trout. Because of the conservation status of the river, and guided by the Environment Agency's National Trout and Grayling Fisheries Strategy, they have reduced the levels of stocking, which still include some triploid brown trout. Research on similar rivers has shown that reducing the levels of restocking can have a disproportionate benefit for the native populations of both brown trout and grayling, and the club are monitoring catch data to see if this is the case on the Lugg. A survey by the Trout Trust identified the bridge at Eaton as a problem for migrating fish, as there is a weir which forms part of the bridge footings. While salmon and larger trout can easily negotiate the flume that this creates, it acts as a barrier to smaller fish, grayling and eels, and they recommended that some remedial action should be taken.

Construction of a Larinier fish pass at Ballsgate Weir, near Aymestrey, was expected to be completed in autumn 2019, but work was delayed by high water levels in the river throughout the winter from September onwards. The need for the fish pass was shown by fish surveys carried out above and below the weir, which showed that while plenty of salmon spawned below the weir, very few succeeded in getting further upstream. The fish pass was completed by the Wye and Usk Foundation in September 2020, and was funded by the European Regional Development Fund. The weir was the last major obstacle on the river for migrating salmon, and opens up miles of spawning grounds further upstream, in addition to making it easier for other species to move up and down the river.

== 2020 and 2021 illegal damage ==
In November/December 2020, damage was done to a 1.5-mile (2.4 km) stretch of the riverbank near Kingsland in Herefordshire. (Note: The affected riverbank runs west from the bridge at 52.25441°N 2.80907°W, on the north side of the river.) The damaged area, which was part of the SSSI, was home to protected wildlife including crayfish, otters, salmon, and lampreys. It was discovered that trees had been felled, river-bed gravel removed, the meanders straightened, and all vegetation in the area had been dug up by bulldozer, without permission, leaving the riverbank devastated.

A lawyer for Salmon and Trout Conservation, who is also a local resident, said:

"This is one of the most egregious acts of ecological vandalism that I have seen in 25 years of working on rivers in the UK"

The Environment Agency, Natural England and the Forestry Commission interrupted the work, preventing further damage. Herefordshire Wildlife Trust said the changes would have "huge repercussions for wildlife downstream" and urged that the landowner responsible be prosecuted. John Price, the landowner, has stated that he was acting legally, and had been asked to carry out the work to prevent flooding of nearby homes. Further damage was done in December 2021.

In March 2022, the Environment Agency and Natural England launched legal proceedings against the landowner, following an investigation. John Price was ordered to appear at Kidderminster Magistrates' Court in May 2022. He admitted seven charges relating to the dumping of materials, modifying the watercourse and natural features, using vehicles to disturb species of interest, and destroying flora and fauna, river habitats and fish populations.

In April 2023, Price was jailed for twelve months and ordered to pay a total of over £1.2million in court costs and for the restoration of the affected stretch of river. His sentence was reduced to 10 months on appeal, and he served 3 months before being released in July 2023.

“The decimation of this section of the River Lugg has been devastating to the local environment and to local people, destroying the habitats of iconic wildlife such as otters, kingfisher and salmon. It was heartbreaking to see this beautiful riverside illegally damaged.”

— Oliver Harmar, Chief Operating Officer at Natural England

By May 2026, Price had installed buffer strips and replanted trees, though some later died, and the Environment Agency and Natural England had also placed logs in the river to encourage fish spawning. The Environment Agency and Natural England said the river's condition was improving, though an ecologist stated the damage could persist for 20 to 30 years.

== Bibliography ==
- Brian, Anthea (1994). As to the Lugg: its vanished mills, broken weirs and damaged bridges. Woolhope Naturalists Field Club. Archived (PDF) from the original on 11 July 2021.
- Butt, R V J (1995). The Directory of Railway Stations. Yeovil: Patrick Stephens. ISBN 978-1-85260-508-7.
- Cohen, I (1956). The Non-Tidal Wye and its Navigation. Woolhope Naturalists Field Club. Archived (PDF) from the original on 11 July 2021.
- Cumberlidge, Jane (2009). Inland Waterways of Great Britain (8th Ed.). Imray Laurie Norie and Wilson. ISBN 978-1-84623-010-3.
- Hadfield, Charles (1967). The Canals of South Wales and the Border. David and Charles. ISBN 978-0-7153-4027-1.
- Jacklin, Tim (June 2015). "Advisory Visit River Lugg, Herefordshire" (PDF). Wild Trout Trust. Archived (PDF) from the original on 5 July 2021.
- Paget-Tomlinson, Edward (2006). The Illustrated History of Canal and River Navigations. Landmark Publishing. ISBN 978-1-84306-207-3.
- Priestley, Joseph (1831). "Historical Account of the Navigable Rivers, Canals and Railways of Great Britain". Archived from the original on 6 March 2016.
