= Ford and Stoke Prior =

Civil parish in Herefordshire, England

Coordinates: 52.1979°N 2.6978302°W

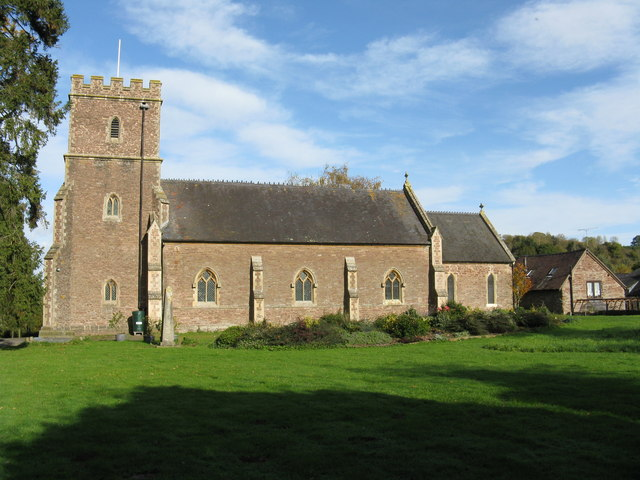
- St Luke's Church, Stoke Prior

- Location within Herefordshire
- OS grid reference: SO524557
  - London: 120 mi (190 km) SE
- Unitary authority: Herefordshire
- Ceremonial county: Herefordshire
- Region: West Midlands
- Country: England
- Sovereign state: United Kingdom
- Post town: Leominster
- Postcode district: HR6
- Dialling code: 01568
- Police: West Mercia
- Fire: Hereford and Worcester
- Ambulance: West Midlands
- UK Parliament: North Herefordshire

Ford and Stoke Prior is a civil parish in the county of Herefordshire, England, and is 10 miles (16 km) north from the city and county town of Hereford. The closest large town is the market town of Leominster, adjacent at the north-west. The parish includes the hamlet of Ford, the village of Stoke Prior, and the medieval parish churches of St Luke and St John of Jerusalem. At the west of the parish is the site of a Romano-British settlement.

== History ==
The name Ford, usually a suffix, and a crossing over a river of stream, is Old English. Stoke is from the Old English 'Stoc' and means an "outlying farmstead or hamlet" or a secondary settlement. Written as "Stoce" in 1038, and "Stoca" in the Domesday Book, the 'Prior' refers to the place as belonging to the Prior of Leominster.

Ford and Stoke Prior were two separate manors in the Domesday Book. At the time of the Norman Conquest both were in the Hundred of Leominster in the county of Herefordshire. Ford had assets of five households, two villagers, five smallholders (middle level of serf below a villager), three slaves and two female slaves. Working the ploughlands were three lord's plough teams. There was also a fishery. In 1066 Alward held the lordship, which passed in 1086 to Drogo (son of Poyntz), with Ralph of Tosny as tenant-in-chief under Queen Edith as overlord for king William I. Stoke Prior is listed with 20.9 households, 224 villagers, 81 smallholders, 13 slaves, 12 female slaves, and six priests. There were 29 lord's and 201 men's plough teams, eight mills, woodland of 6.3 leagues and a further 60 lands of the lord. In 1066 Queen Edith held the lordship, this passing to in 1086 to tenant-in-chief and king William I.

Solicita and Matilda Ford (fl. c. 1200), the earliest known English women doctors, practised at Ford.

== Geography ==
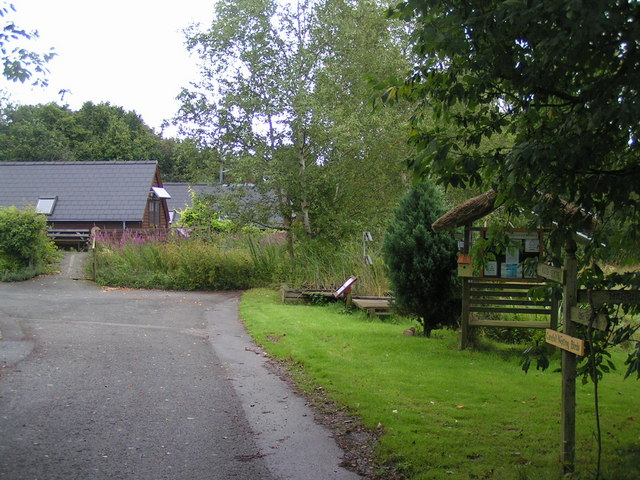
Humber Marsh Nature Reserve

Ford and Stoke Prior is approximately 3 miles (5 km) from north to south and 1.5 miles (2 km) east to west. Adjacent parishes are Leominster at the north and north-west, Humber at the east, Bodenham at the south-east, Hope under Dinmore at the south, and Newton at the south-west. The parish is rural, of farms, fields, managed woodland and coppices, water courses, isolated and dispersed businesses, residential properties, Humber Marsh Nature Reserve, and the nucleated settlements of the hamlet of Ford at the western border of the parish, and Stoke Prior at the centre north. Ford consists of a farm, a golf course and the church of St John of Jerusalem. Stoke Prior is largely residential with village farms and the church of St Luke's. The only major route is the A44 Worcester Road, which runs through the extreme north-east, and which begins locally at Leominster, and runs to Bromyard at 7 miles (11 km) to the east of the parish. All other routes are minor roads, country lanes, bridleways, farm tracks and footpaths. The River Lugg, a tributary of the River Wye, forms the boundary between the parish and both Leominster and Newton. Parts of the boundaries with Humber, Bodenham and Hope under Dinmore are formed by the Humber Brook, a tributary of the River Lugg.

== Governance ==
Ford and Stoke Prior is represented in the lowest tier of UK governance by six members on the eleven-member Humber, Ford and Stoke Prior Parish Council. As Herefordshire is a unitary authority—no district council between parish and county councils—the parish sends one councillor, representing the Hampton Ward, to Herefordshire County Council. Ford and Stoke Prior is represented in the UK parliament as part of the North Herefordshire constituency, held since 2024 by Ellie Chowns of the Green Party of England and Wales.

In 1974 Ford and Stoke Prior, as separate civil parishes, became part of the now defunct Leominster District of the county of Hereford and Worcester, instituted under the Local Government Act 1972. Until Brexit, on 31 January 2020, the parish was represented in the European Parliament as part of the West Midlands constituency.

== Community ==
Parish population in 2001 was 383, and in 2011, 364.

The parish is served by two non-intersecting bus routes, at Stoke Prior village and the A44 road, and near Ford on the B4361 road, both providing connections between Leominster and Hereford. The closest rail connection is at Leominster railway station, 2 miles (3 km) to the north-west, on the Crewe to Newport Welsh Marches Line. The nearest hospital is Leominster Community Hospital at Leominster, with the nearest major hospital Hereford County Hospital at Hereford.

At the south-west of the parish, at Ford, is Leominster Golf Course. The parish school is Stoke Prior Primary School in Stoke Prior village; the school received an Ofsted rating of Grade 1 (Outstanding) in 2017. The village also contains a village hall. On the outskirts of the village are three self catering vacation establishments, and 1 mile (1.6 km) to the south, bed and breakfast accommodation.

The Anglican churches of St Luke at Stoke Prior village and St John Of Jerusalem at Ford are in the Diocese of Hereford, and both part of the Leominster Team Ministry.

== Landmarks ==
Within the parish are one Grade II* and twenty-three Grade II listed buildings and structures, and sixteen scheduled monuments. The two parish churches are St Luke at Stoke Prior and St John of Jerusalem at Ford. St Lukes is Grade II* and probably dates to the 14th century. It was rebuilt in 1863 but retains fittings from the earlier church, such as the 14th-century stone font, a parish chest from c.1700, and 18th-century monuments and memorials. St John of Jerusalem is Grade II and dates to the 12th century. It was rebuilt in 1851 on the previous church's foundations. There are monuments and memorials from the 18th century and plate from 1688.

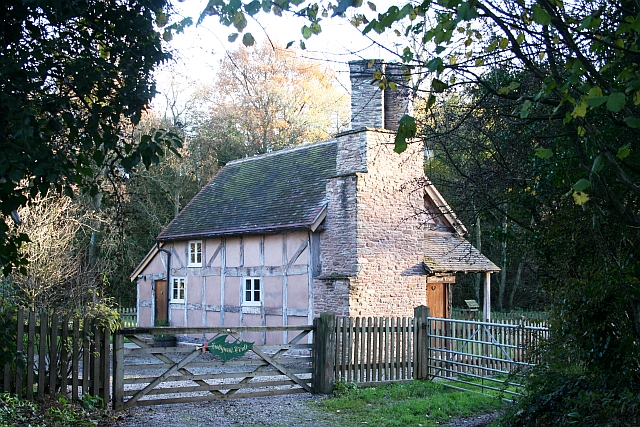
Wickton Court

Wickton Court, partly timber-framed and of two storeys, and just over 1 mile (1.6 km) south from Stoke Prior, dates to the 17th century, with later alterations and additions. The Priory, a partly timber-framed house dating to the 14th century and retaining a blocked window of that time, was extended and altered in the 17th and 18th. The house is supposed to have belonged to Leominster Priory.

Half a mile (800 m) east from Stoke Prior is the site of a Romano-British town, defined as enclosures through cropmarks. Evidence was unearthed of a stone hypocausts, rooms, and a courtyard. Finds include Roman pottery, such as Samian ware, animal bones, human skeletons, parts of amphora, rings and bracelets, roof tiles, and painted wall plaster. Coins from the time of Hadrian, Augustus, Trajan, Constantine the Great, Agrippina, Vespasian, Crispus, Tetricus, Constans, Honorius and Constantine III have been discovered. Many of the finds were made in 1881 during the construction of the Leominster-Bromyard railway.
