= Steens Bridge railway station =

Former railway station in Herefordshire, England

Steens Bridge

General information
- Location: East of Stoke Prior, Herefordshire; England
- Coordinates: 52.2112°N 2.6699°W
- Grid reference: SO543572
- Platforms: 1

Other information
- Status: Disused

History
- Original company: Worcester, Bromyard and Leominster Railway
- Pre-grouping: Great Western Railway
- Post-grouping: Great Western Railway

Key dates
- 15 September 1884: Opened
- 15 September 1952: Closed
Location

Steens Bridge railway station was a stop on the Worcester, Bromyard and Leominster Railway; it was sited to the east of Stoke Prior, in Herefordshire, England.

== History ==
=== Opening ===
Opened in 1884 as part of the final section of the Worcester, Bromyard and Leominster Railway, the railway was bought out of bankruptcy by the Great Western Railway in 1888, which completed the line in 1897.

=== Closure ===
After the Second World War, and with the greater use of the motorbus and private cars, traffic on the line fell considerably. The line closed to regular passenger services on 15 September 1952.

On 26 April 1958, a special train organised by the Stephenson Locomotive Society ran from Worcester Shrub Hill to Leominster, calling at Bromyard, Rowden Mill, Fencote and Steens Bridge. The 50 society members and passengers rode on the last train that would run on the complete track before it was removed. The Worcester to Bromyard section was closed under the Beeching Axe in 1964.

Preceding station	Disused railways	Following station
Stoke Prior Halt; Line and station closed	Great Western Railway; Worcester, Bromyard and Leominster Railway	Fencote; Line and station closed
