= Rowden Mill railway station =

Disused railway station in Herefordshire, England

Rowden Mill
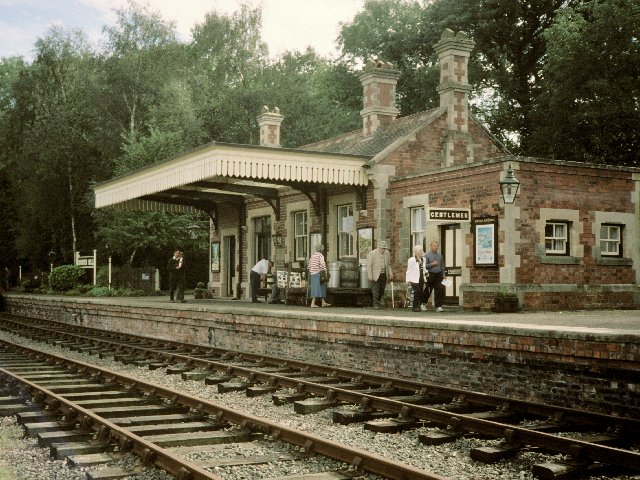
- Open day, August 1997

General information
- Location: Wacton, Herefordshire; England
- Coordinates: 52.2057°N 2.5469°W
- Grid reference: SO627566
- Platforms: 1

Other information
- Status: Disused

History
- Original company: Leominster and Bromyard Railway
- Pre-grouping: Great Western Railway
- Post-grouping: Great Western Railway

Key dates
- 1 September 1897: Station opened
- September 1949: Unstaffed
- 15 September 1952: Station closed
Location

Rowden Mill railway station was a stop on the Worcester, Bromyard and Leominster Railway; it served an area to the north-west of Bromyard, in Herefordshire, England.

== History ==
=== Opening ===
Opened as part of the final section of the Worcester, Bromyard and Leominster Railway, the railway was bought out of bankruptcy by the Great Western Railway in 1888, which completed the line in 1897.

=== Closure ===
After the Second World War, and with the greater use of the motorbus and private cars, traffic on the line fell considerably. Unstaffed as a station from September 1949, the line closed to regular passenger services on 15 September 1952.

On 26 April 1958, a special train organised by the Stephenson Locomotive Society ran from Worcester Shrub Hill to Leominster, via Bromyard, calling at Rowden Mill, Fencote and Steens Bridge. The 50 society members rode on the last train that would run on the complete track before it was removed. The Worcester to Bromyard section was subsequently closed under the Beeching Axe in 1964.

Preceding station	Disused railways	Following station
Fencote; Line and station closed	Great Western Railway; Worcester, Bromyard and Leominster Railway	Bromyard; Line and station closed

== Preservation ==
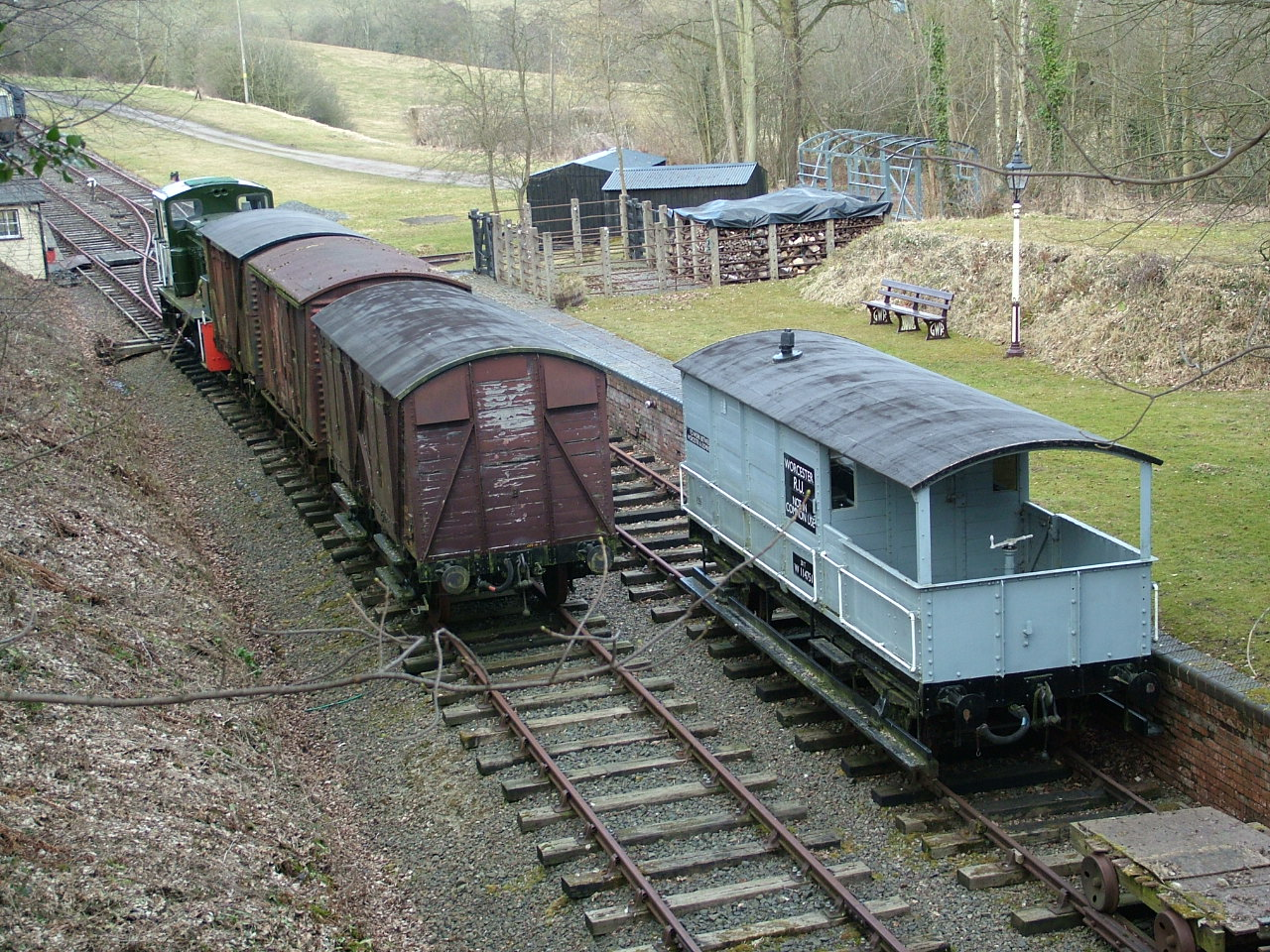
A view of Rowden Mill station in 2010, showing a Class 03 shunter no. D2371, GWR Toad brake van and various wagons

The Rowden Mill site was purchased privately in 1984 and was restored. Two sections of track were also reinstalled. Rolling stock of various types including coaches, brake vans and goods vans have been located on the line at various times in the recent past.

In March 1989, Rowden Mill received the British Rail Award in the Ian Allan Publishing Railway Heritage Awards for the Best Renovated Non-Working Station.

Rowden Mill station now operates as a holiday letting business, making the station buildings and a British Railways Inspection Saloon is available as accommodation to visiting guests.
