= Leominster Abbey =

Medieval monastery and convent in Leominster, England

Coordinates: 52.229°N 2.735°W

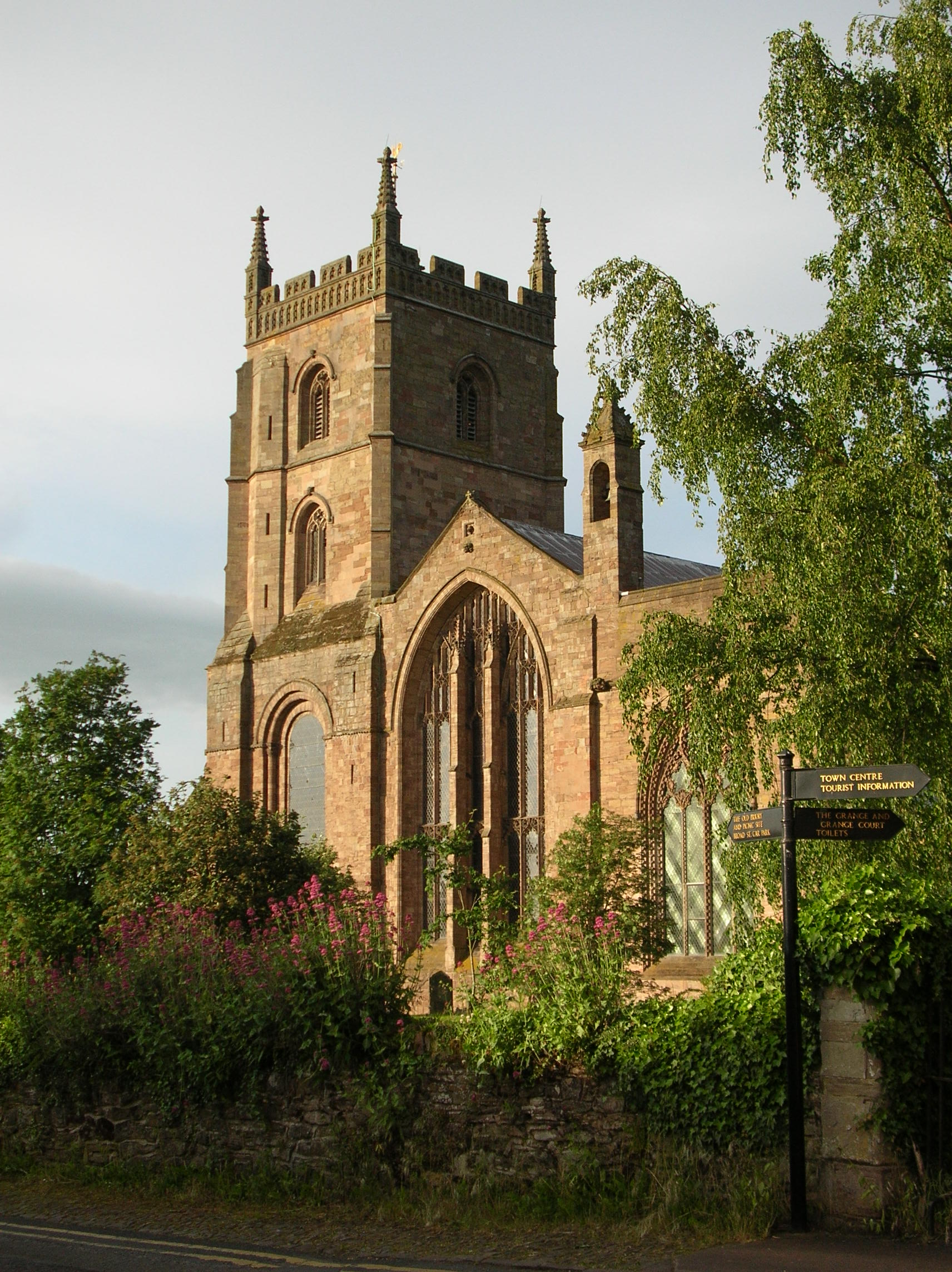
Priory Church, Leominster

Leominster abbey was an Anglo-Saxon monastery established at Leominster in the county of Hereford, England. The name of the town refers to its minster, a settlement of clergy living a communal life.

The monastery, perhaps founded in the seventh century, was originally a male house. After being destroyed by Danes, it was rebuilt as a Benedictine abbey for nuns (see Leominster nunnery). In 1046 the abbess, Eadgifu, was abducted by Sweyn Godwinson. Eadgifu is only abbess known by name. The convent was probably dissolved or suppressed not long after this incident.`

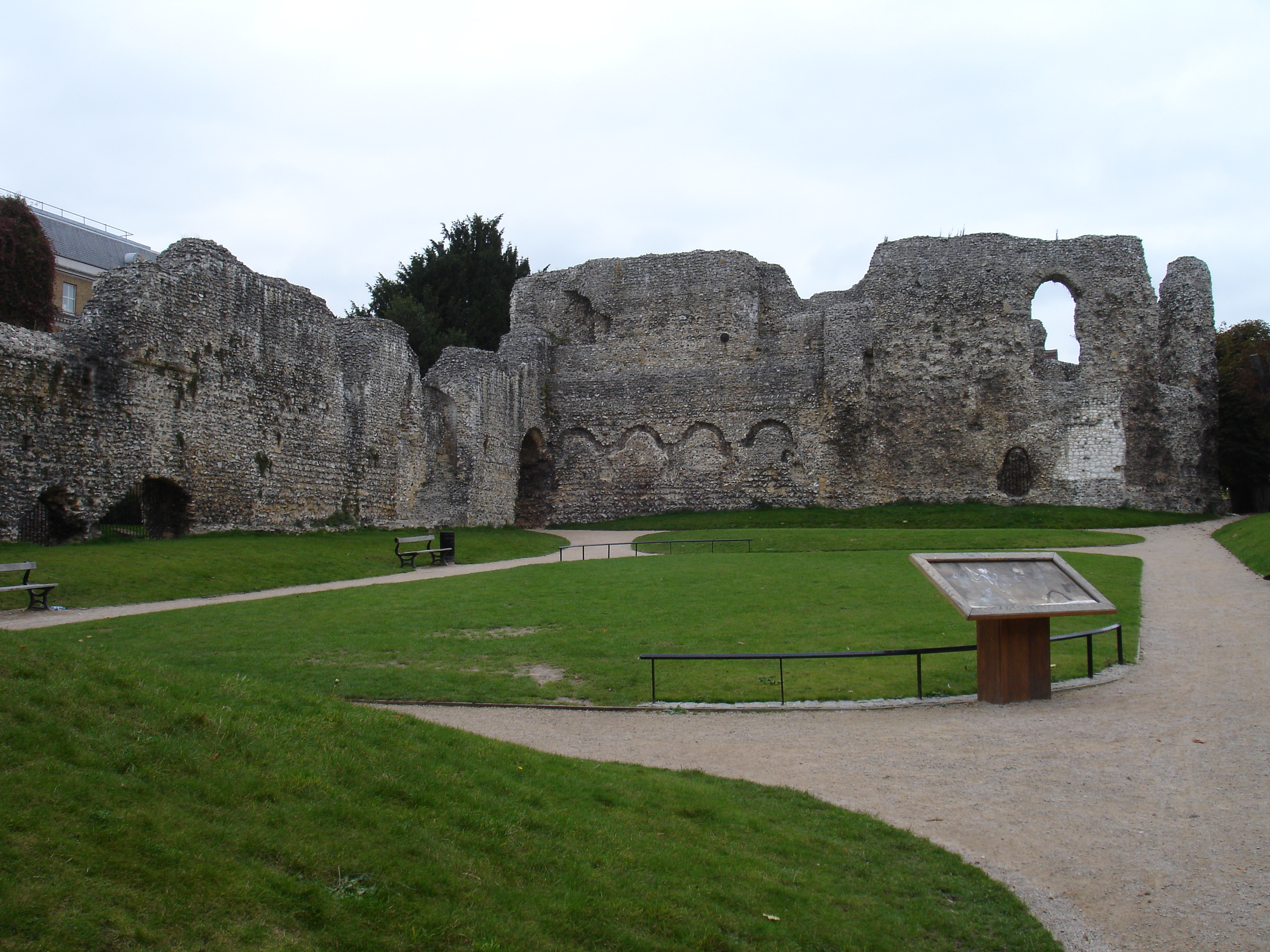
Ruins of Reading Abbey in Berkshire, which founded a priory at Leominster in the 12th century.

In the 12th century Henry I incorporated land at Leominster into the foundation of Reading Abbey in Berkshire. Reading Abbey in turn founded a Benedictine priory in Leominster of which the Priory Church survives at grid reference SO49855927. Whether the priory was built on the site of the original Anglo-Saxon monastery is not clear. However, archaeological evidence of Saxon activity has been uncovered at the priory.

The Galba Prayer Books, used at Leominster Abbey during the early 11th century, were probably mostly copied by a female scribe after 1016, whom medieval scholar and historian Katie Ann-Marie Bugyis calls "one of the most prolific contributors to the compilation" and most likely worked at the request of her abbess. This scribe wrote in Old English and Latin. Bugyis speculates that the female scribe, like Edith of Wilton, created the Galba book for her own use, but that her fellow nuns later made their own contributions to it, either in direct collaboration with her or after her death, and that eventually it became a way to train those who used it in their own prayer practices.
