= Fencote railway station =

Disused railway station in Herefordshire, England

Fencote
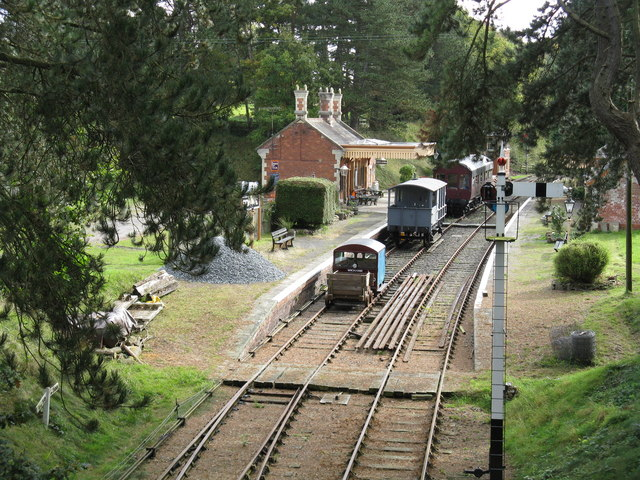
- Fencote railway station, October 2008

General information
- Location: Hatfield, Herefordshire; England
- Coordinates: 52.2274°N 2.5856°W
- Grid reference: SO601589
- Platforms: 2

Other information
- Status: Disused

History
- Original company: Leominster and Bromyard Railway
- Pre-grouping: Great Western Railway
- Post-grouping: Great Western Railway

Key dates
- 1 September 1897: Station opened
- September 1949: Unstaffed
- 15 September 1952: Closed
Location

Fencote railway station was a stop on the Worcester, Bromyard and Leominster Railway; it served the civil parish of Hatfield and Newhampton, in Herefordshire, England.

== History ==
=== Opening ===
Opened as part of the final section of the Worcester, Bromyard and Leominster Railway, the railway was bought out of bankruptcy by the Great Western Railway in 1888, which completed the line in 1897.

=== Closure ===
After the Second World War, and with the greater use of the motorbus and private cars, traffic on the line fell considerably. Unstaffed as a station from September 1949, the line closed to regular passenger services on 15 September 1952.

On 26 April 1958, a special train organised by the Stephenson Locomotive Society ran from Worcester Shrub Hill to Leominster, calling at Bromyard, Rowden Mill, Fencote and Steens Bridge. The 50 society members and passengers rode on the last train that would run on the complete track before it was removed. The Worcester to Bromyard section was closed under the Beeching Axe in 1964.

Preceding station	Disused railways	Following station
Steens Bridge; Line and station closed	Great Western Railway; Worcester, Bromyard and Leominster Railway	Rowden Mill; Line and station closed

== Preservation ==
In 1980, Fencote was bought by a former railway employee who restored it as a private residence. The signal box has since been restored and sections of the track either side of station have been reinstalled. In 1984, neighbouring station Rowden Mill was bought and restored. Both sites are occasionally open for public access and viewing, but without operational trains.
