= Suckley =

Village in Worcestershire, England

Coordinates: 52.162245°N 2.407894°W

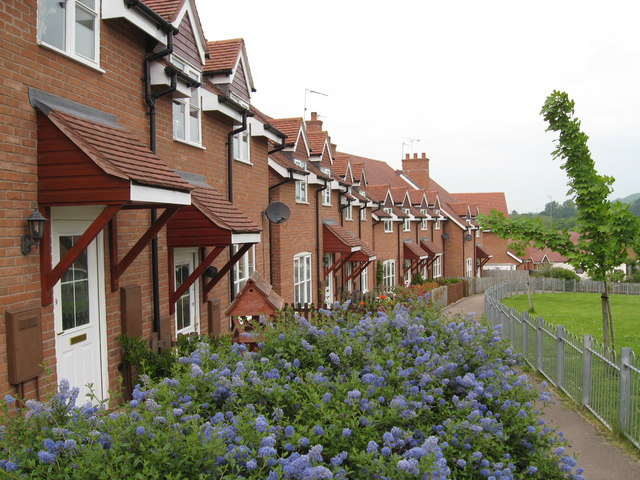
- Affordable housing, Damson Way, Suckley

- Location within Worcestershire
- OS grid reference: SO721516
- Civil parish: Suckley
- District: Malvern Hills
- Shire county: Worcestershire
- Region: West Midlands
- Country: England
- Sovereign state: United Kingdom
- Post town: WORCESTER
- Postcode district: WR6
- Police: West Mercia
- Fire: Hereford and Worcester
- Ambulance: West Midlands
- UK Parliament: West Worcestershire

Suckley is a village and civil parish in the Malvern Hills District in the county of Worcestershire, England, close to the border with Herefordshire. The parish includes the hamlets of Suckley Knowl (at grid reference SO715531), Suckley Green at SO719532 and Longley Green at SO733503.

Covering 4 square miles (10 km^{2}), Suckley is geographically one of the largest parishes in Worcestershire, but one of the least populated with only around 250 residences. Seven farms use the greater part of the available land, producing apples, beef, cereals, hops, milk, oil seed rape, pears and potatoes. The eastern side of the Parish is part of the Malvern Hills Area of Outstanding Natural Beauty. Within Suckley there are several dozen micro-businesses operating from private homes, ranging from beauty therapy to furniture restoration, from computer maintenance to interior design, from motor mechanics to plumbing. Most of the population in employment commute to Malvern, Worcester, Hereford, Cheltenham or the West Midlands.

The parish's population increased from 549 to 599 between the 2001 and 2011 censuses, the increase being entirely attributable to older age groups. The population of school age reduced sharply over the decade. 2011 census data shows a population with above average levels of educational attainment, lower than average unemployment and levels of poverty. Car ownership is at a very high level (535 cars or vans for a population of 506 aged 17 or over), with only 5 households of 262 not having access to a car.

A summary parish profile has been created by Malvern Hills District Council.

== History and amenities ==
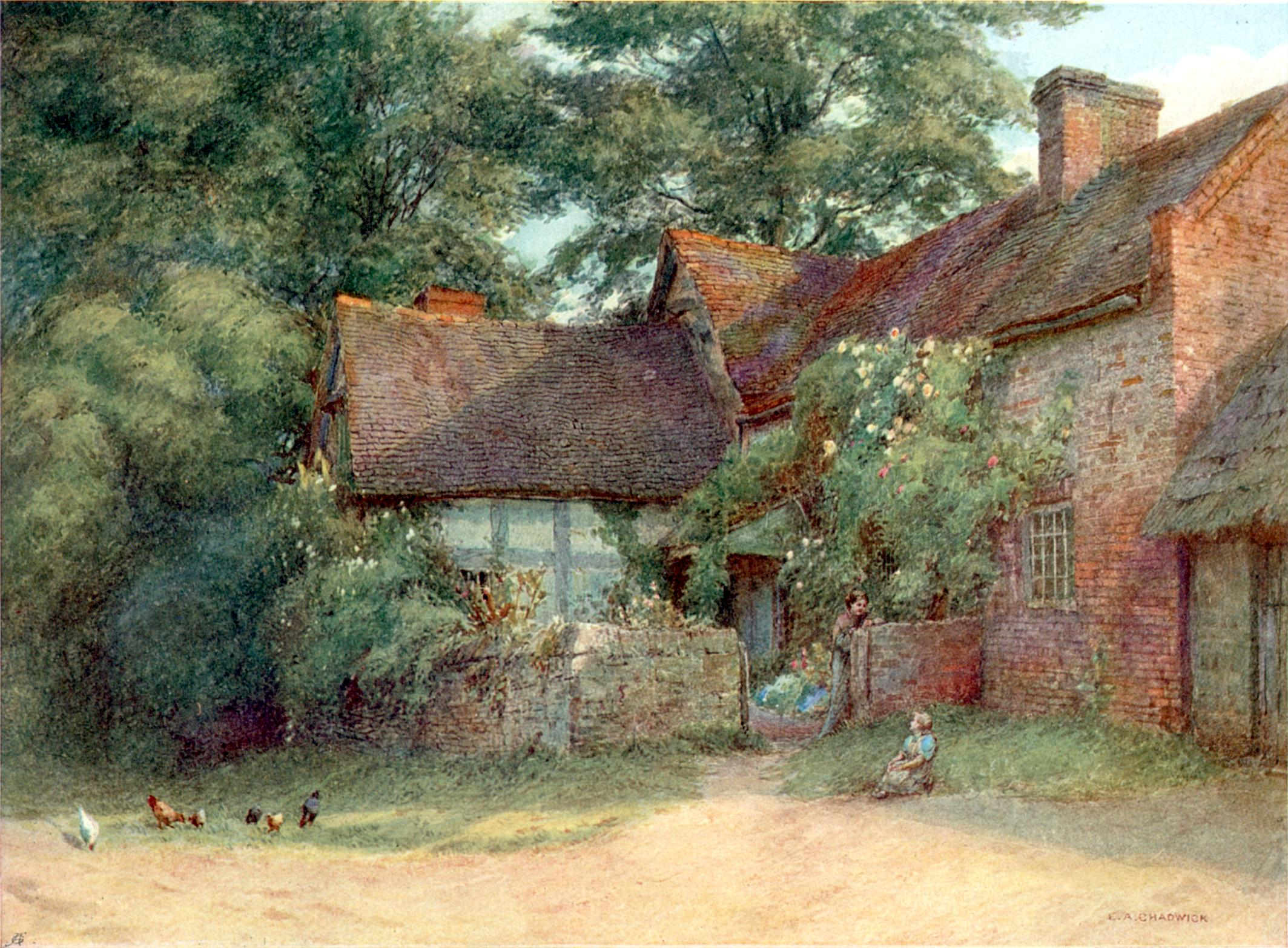
Suckley, Worcestershire. From a water-colour drawing by E. A. Chadwick - 1906

The name Suckley derives from the Old English sucgalēah meaning 'bird wood/clearing'. The bird in question may be a sparrow or a Common whitethroat.

The parish church is dedicated to John the Baptist. Plans to modernise the church are going ahead, the aim is to make the church more important and useful to the local community by making it into a community centre as well as a church.

Following the Poor Law Amendment Act 1834 Suckley Parish ceased to be responsible for maintaining the poor in its parish. This responsibility was transferred to Martley Poor Law Union. Suckley railway station was opened in 1897 on the Worcester, Bromyard and Leominster Railway. The station lay outside the parish in the parish of Knightwick, as did the nearby stations of Knightwick and Yearsett, both of which dated from the opening of the line from Worcester to a temporary terminus at Yearsett in 1877 (closed 1888 when the line was opened throughout to Bromyard). Suckley station closed with the Worcester-Bromyard line on 5 September 1964. The replacement bus service ran until 2012 when the Suckley-Bromyard section was cancelled due to lack of ridership. Bus services continue to operate between Suckley and Worcester. After a review of public transport by Worcestershire County Council in 2014, the frequency doubled to six buses per day, the most frequent service ever of public transport for the parish. In contrast the 2014 review ended the single, weekly bus service between Suckley and Malvern.

The village has a village shop and post office serving the community, plus two public houses, The Nelson Inn and The Cross Keys. The village also has a thriving primary school for pupils between 4 and 11 years of age. Over 80 pupils were enrolled for the 2014/15 school year, with many travelling from adjacent parishes which lack schools. It was renamed from Suckley Primary School to Suckley School after being granted Academy status in September 2011.

Suckley was in the upper division of Doddingtree Hundred.

Three websites document various aspects of parish life:

- Suckley Parish Council
- Suckley Post Office & Stores
- The Village of Suckley
