= Knightwick railway station =

Former railway station in Worcestershire, England

Knightwick
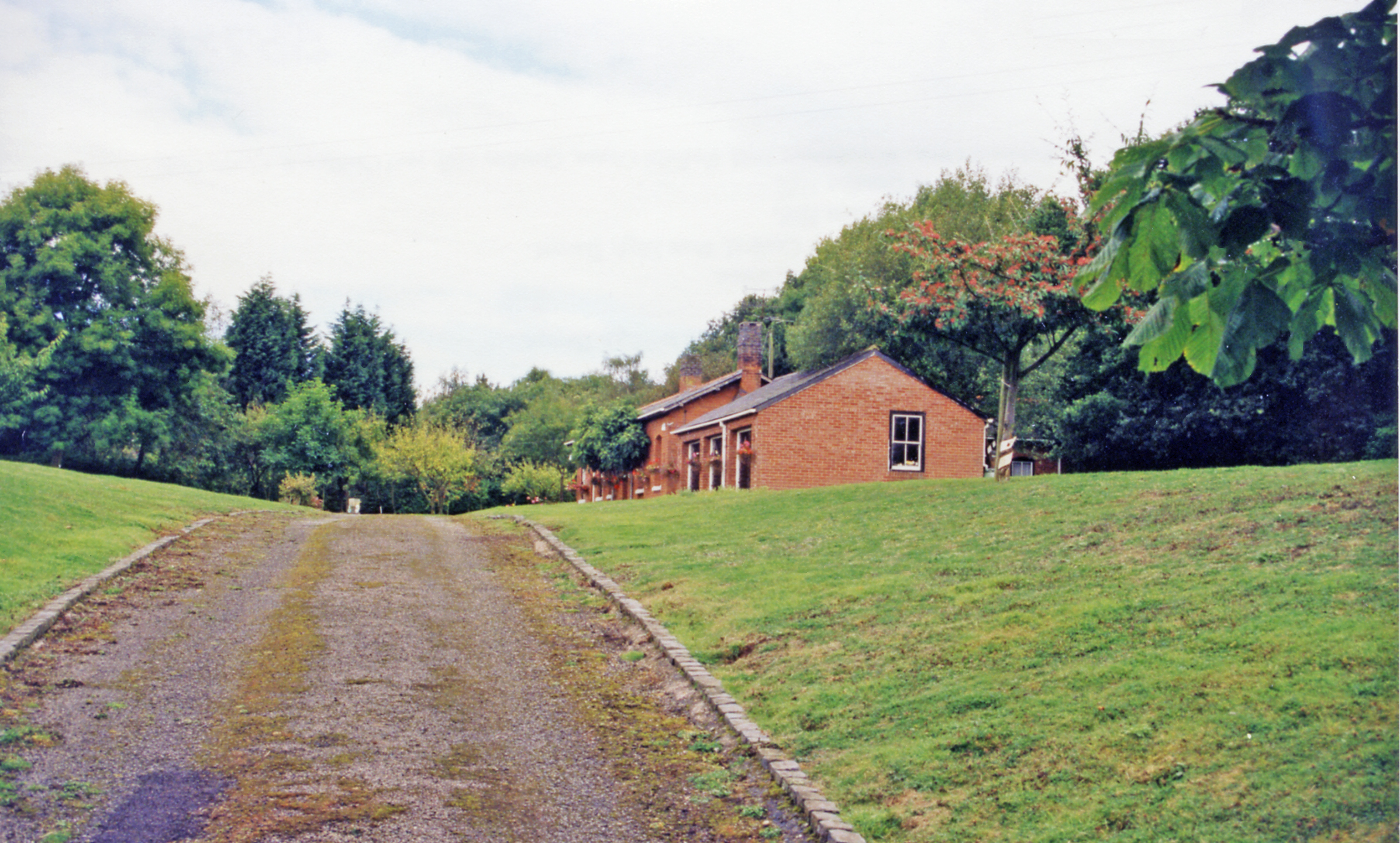
- The site of the station in 1999

General information
- Location: Knightwick, Worcestershire; England
- Coordinates: 52.1938°N 2.3841°W
- Grid reference: SO738551
- Platforms: 1

Other information
- Status: Disused

History
- Original company: Worcester, Bromyard and Leominster Railway
- Pre-grouping: Great Western Railway
- Post-grouping: Great Western Railway

Key dates
- 2 May 1874: Opened
- 7 September 1964: Closed
Location

Knightwick railway station was a station in Knightwick, Worcestershire, England. The station was opened on 2 May 1874 and closed on 7 September 1964.

Preceding station	Disused railways	Following station
Suckley; Line and station closed	Great Western Railway; Worcester, Bromyard and Leominster Railway	Leigh Court; Line and station closed
