= Leominster nunnery =

Nunnery in Leominster, England

Coordinates: 52.229861°N 2.736134°W

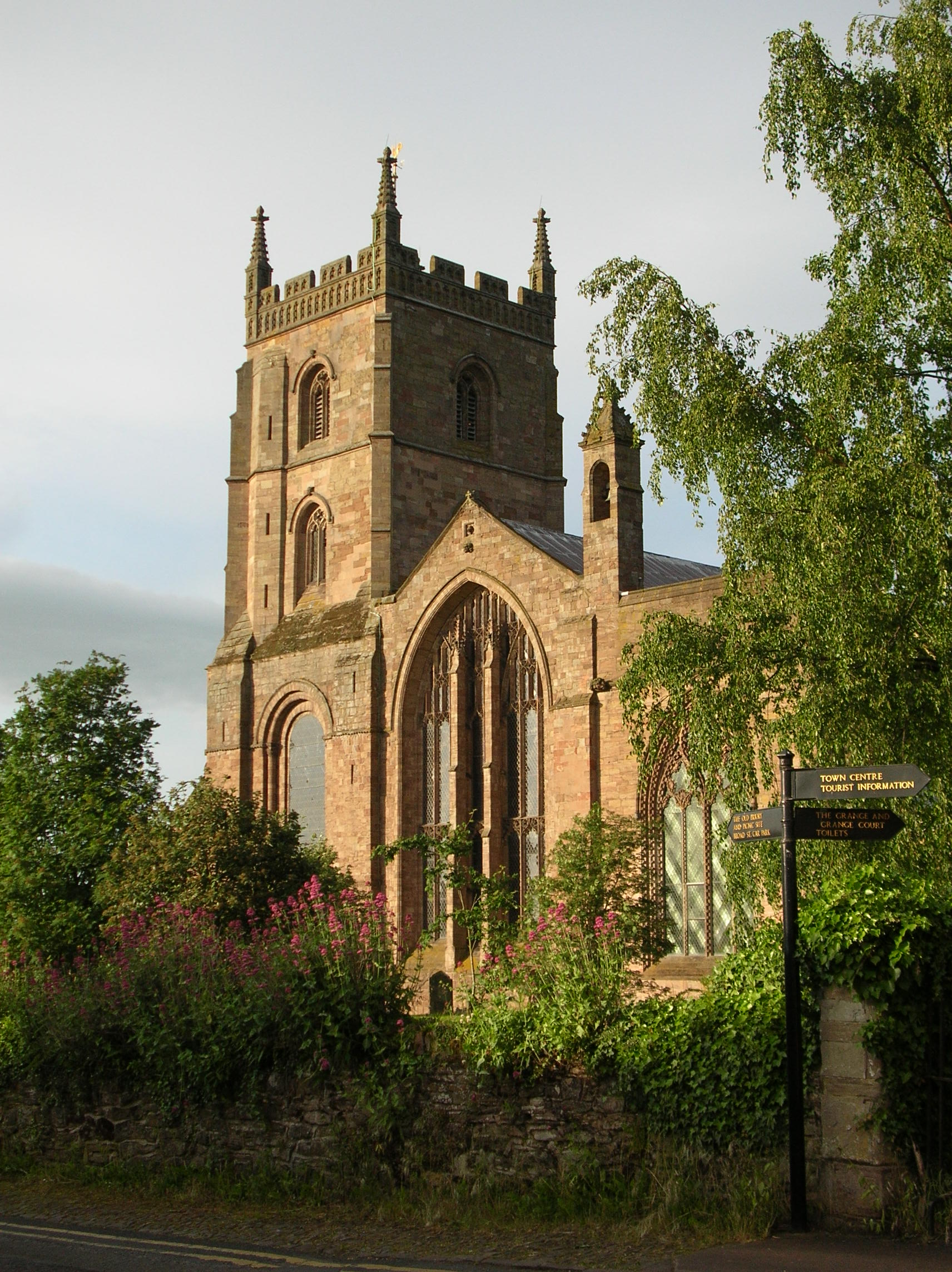
The (current) Priory Church building at Leominster

Leominster nunnery was an Anglo-Saxon nunnery at Leominster, Herefordshire, England. Founded in the ninth century, the nunnery is known to have been active in the eleventh century. The exact location of the nunnery is not known, but it may have been the site later occupied by Leominster Priory, a twelfth-century foundation.
