= Stoke Prior, Herefordshire =

Village in Herefordshire, England

Coordinates: 52.206°N 2.702°W

Stoke Prior
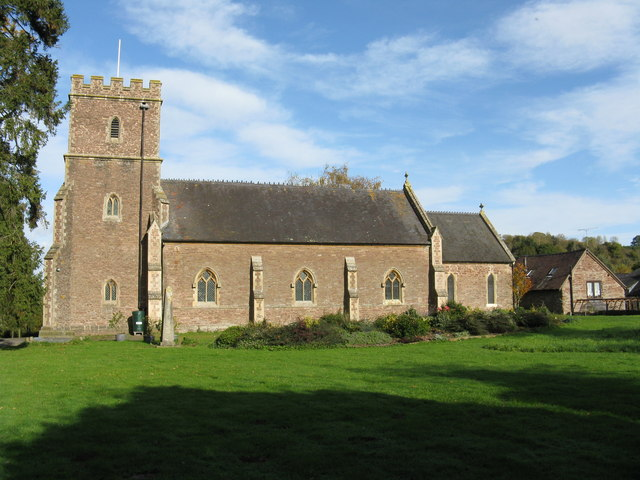

- Location within Herefordshire
- Civil parish: Ford and Stoke Prior
- Unitary authority: County of Herefordshire
- Ceremonial county: Herefordshire
- Region: West Midlands
- Country: England
- Sovereign state: United Kingdom

Stoke Prior is a village and former civil parish, now in the parish of Ford and Stoke Prior in Herefordshire, England, and is 2 miles (3 km) south-east from Leominster.

The village' population is included with Ford and Stoke Prior; it was 364 at the 2011 census.

Stoke Prior Community Primary School has three classes for children from the ages of 4 to 11. In a 2007 Ofsted inspection, the overall effectiveness of the school was rated as Grade 1 (Outstanding).

At the Stoke Prior Halt railway station, Stoke Prior was served by the now closed Worcester, Bromyard and Leominster Railway.

In 1961 the parish had a population of 249. On 1 April 1987 the parish was abolished and merged with Ford to form "Ford & Stoke Prior". Parts also went to Leominster and to form Docklow & Hampton Wafer.
