= Suckley railway station =

Former railway station in Worcestershire, England

Suckley

General information
- Location: Suckley, Worcestershire; England
- Coordinates: 52.1835°N 2.4106°W
- Grid reference: SO720539

Other information
- Status: Disused

History
- Original company: Great Western Railway
- Pre-grouping: Great Western Railway
- Post-grouping: Great Western Railway

Key dates
- 1 March 1878: Opened
- 7 September 1964: Closed
Location

Suckley railway station was a station in Suckley, Worcestershire, England. The station was opened on 1 March 1878 and closed on 7 September 1964.

Preceding station	Disused railways	Following station
Yearsett; Line and station closed	Great Western Railway; Worcester, Bromyard and Leominster Railway	Knightwick; Line and station closed
