= Bromyard and Linton Light Railway =

Narrow gauge railway in England

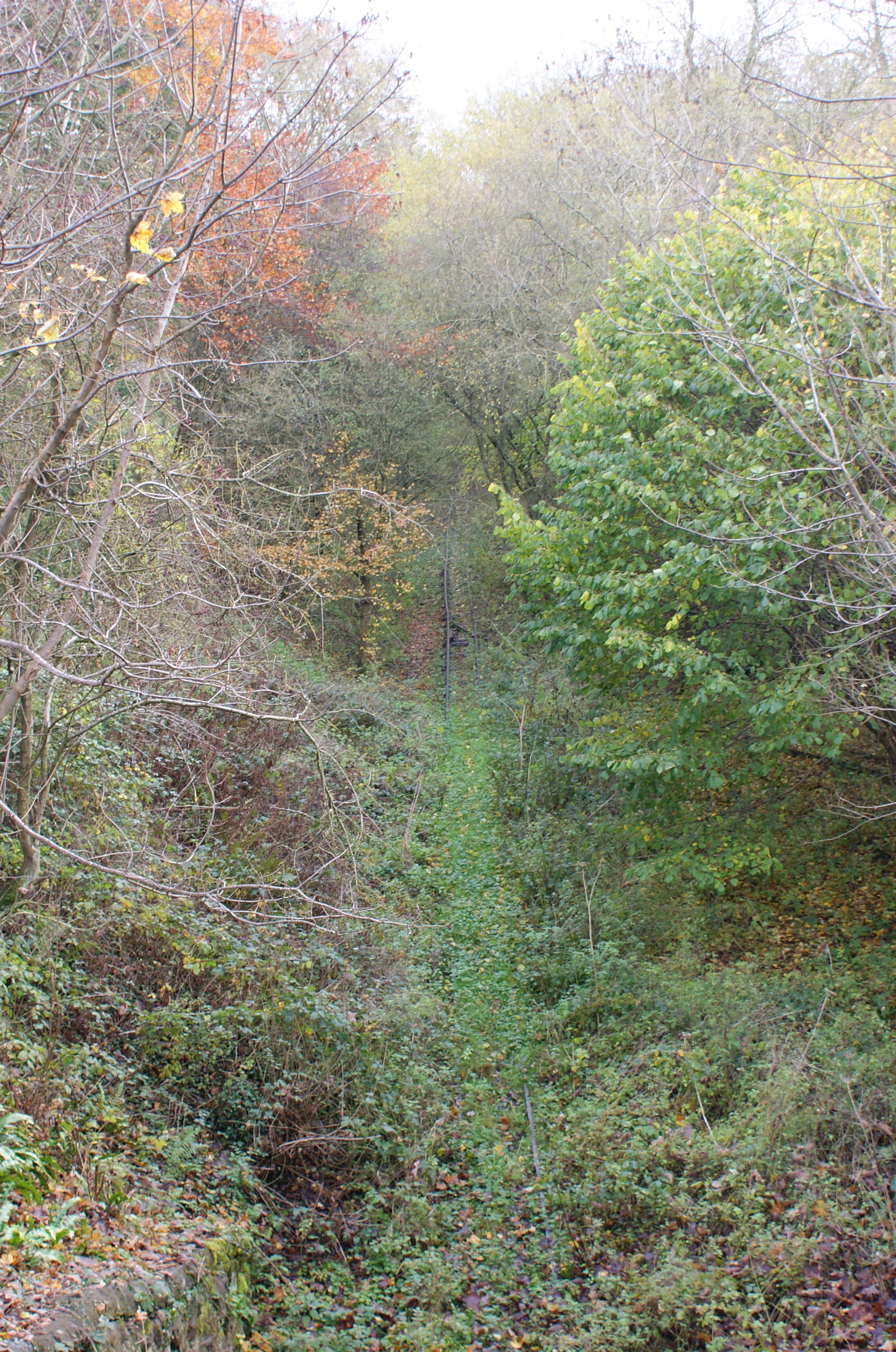
View of the track bed from the A.44 bridge looking east towards the Avenbury Road bridge

The Bromyard and Linton Light Railway is a 1-mile (1.6 km) single track, 2 ft (610 mm) narrow gauge railway line that runs between Bromyard and the Linton Industrial Estate, just off the A44. The track is laid on the bed of the old BR Worcester, Bromyard and Leominster Railway line. The track runs from an old depot, close to the site of the old Bromyard station, and ends under a bridge near a hospital turned flat block. The bridge was constructed in 1877 and carries a lane. There are disused engines in sheds at the main depot and Linton depot. The present track was used for the disused sandstone quarry.

== History ==
With a decrease in rail traffic the standard-gauge British Rail line was closed to passenger trains in 1964 and finally dismantled in 1965 under the Beeching cuts. The station and station yard in Bromyard were originally purchased by Bill Morris, whose company 'Morris Coaches Bromyard', founded in 1966, ran a bus service in the area. Around this time the rights to the track-bed, running for about a mile towards the Linton Trading Estate, were also acquired.

Sometime after then part of the old Bromyard station yard and the track bed were acquired by Bob Palmer. In 1978 he formed a company limited by guarantee called The Bromyard & Linton Light Railway Association (no. 01354372). Soon after this date a single 2 ft (610 mm) narrow gauge ‘Jubilee-track’ line was laid, on the old BR track bed, as far as the road bridge of Avenbury Lane, a distance of about 1 mile (1.6 km). Sidings and an engine shed were built on the Linton Industrial estate, just off the A44.

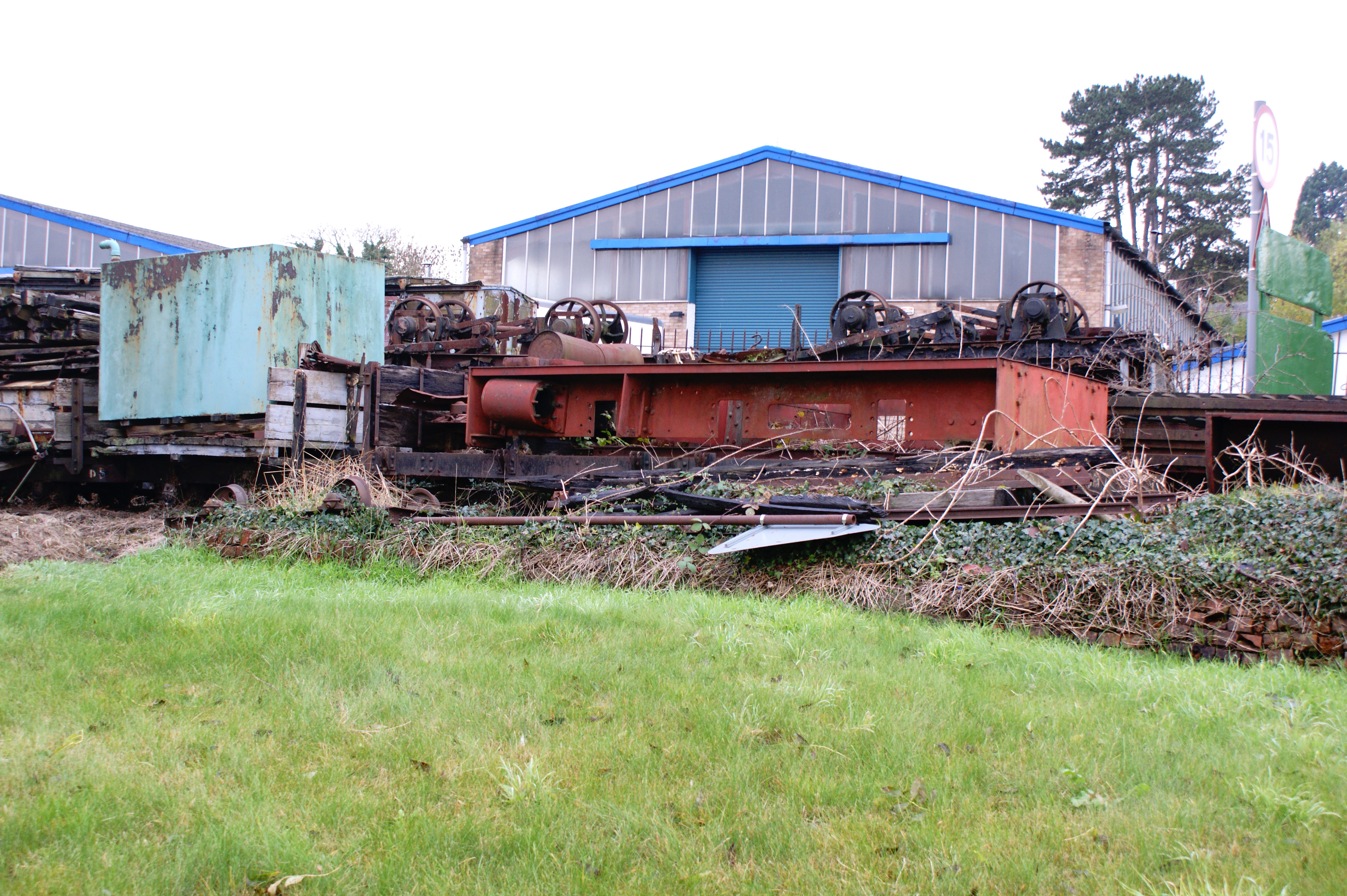
The chassis frame of the Peckett & Sons locomotive no 1327 known as Mesozoic

Since then various rolling stock was acquired, including a number of Ruston diesel-powered engines and a Peckett and Sons steam locomotive, No.1327 0-6-0ST built in 1913 named Mesozoic, which had originally served on the Southam Cement Works railway in Warwickshire. Pictures of a similar locomotive can be found on the Warwickshire Railways website. This locomotive is at present preserved in a dismantled state.

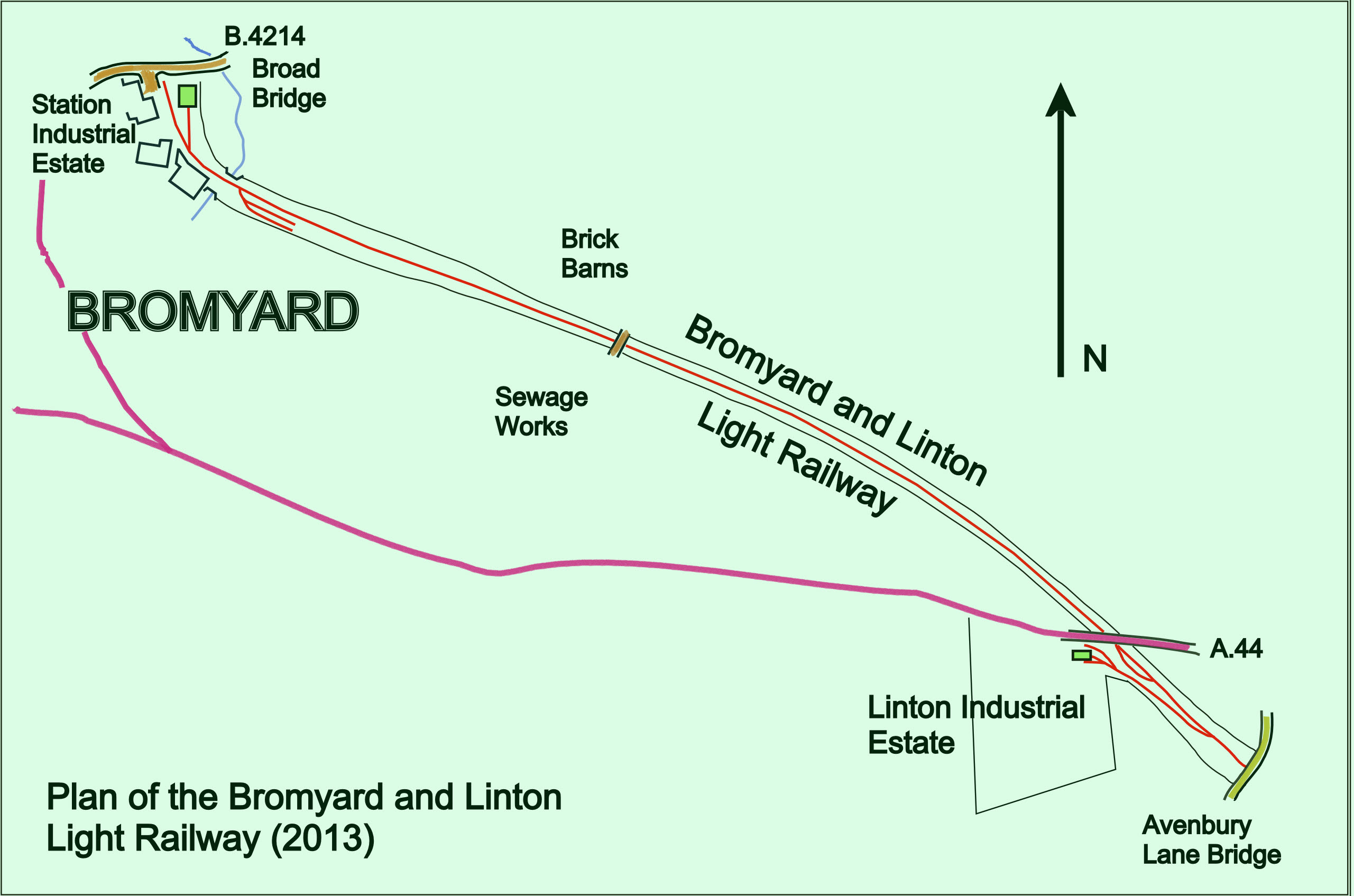
Map of the Bromyard and Linton Light Railway

In 1991 a registered charity (no.1025344) was formed to promote the railway and to preserve the stock. Initially some activity took place on the line, with some static open days, however various issues and problems have meant that the line today is only occasionally used by the owner. Some of the rolling stock is exposed to the elements, which is now beginning to rust or rot away, and can be seen at the Bromyard end of the line alongside the access road to the Station Industrial site (see photo of Mesozoic).

== Present ==
It is unknown at this stage whether any action will be taken to renovate and upgrade the line and make this available to public access. The undergrowth is sometimes cut back, but the Station Industrial Estate now occupies the site of the original Bromyard station. The narrow gauge track remains in place.

== Bibliography ==
- Smith, William (1998). The Bromyard Branch: From Worcester to Leominster. Kidderminster Railway Museum. ISBN 0-9534775-0-9.
- Latham, J.B. (1975). Railways and Preservation. J.B. Latham.
