= Stoke Prior Halt railway station =

Former railway station in Herefordshire, England

Stoke Prior Halt

General information
- Location: Stoke Prior, Herefordshire; England
- Coordinates: 52.2038°N 2.6990°W
- Grid reference: SO523564
- Platforms: 1

Other information
- Status: Disused

History
- Post-grouping: Great Western Railway

Key dates
- 8 July 1929: Opened
- 15 September 1952: Closed
Location

Stoke Prior Halt railway station was a station in Stoke Prior, Herefordshire, England. The station was opened on 8 July 1929 and closed in 1952

Preceding station	Disused railways	Following station
Leominster; Line and station open	Great Western Railway; Worcester, Bromyard and Leominster Railway	Steens Bridge; Line and station closed
