= Priory Church, Leominster =

Anglican church in Herefordshire, England

Coordinates: 52.2293°N 2.7359°W

The Priory Church, Leominster
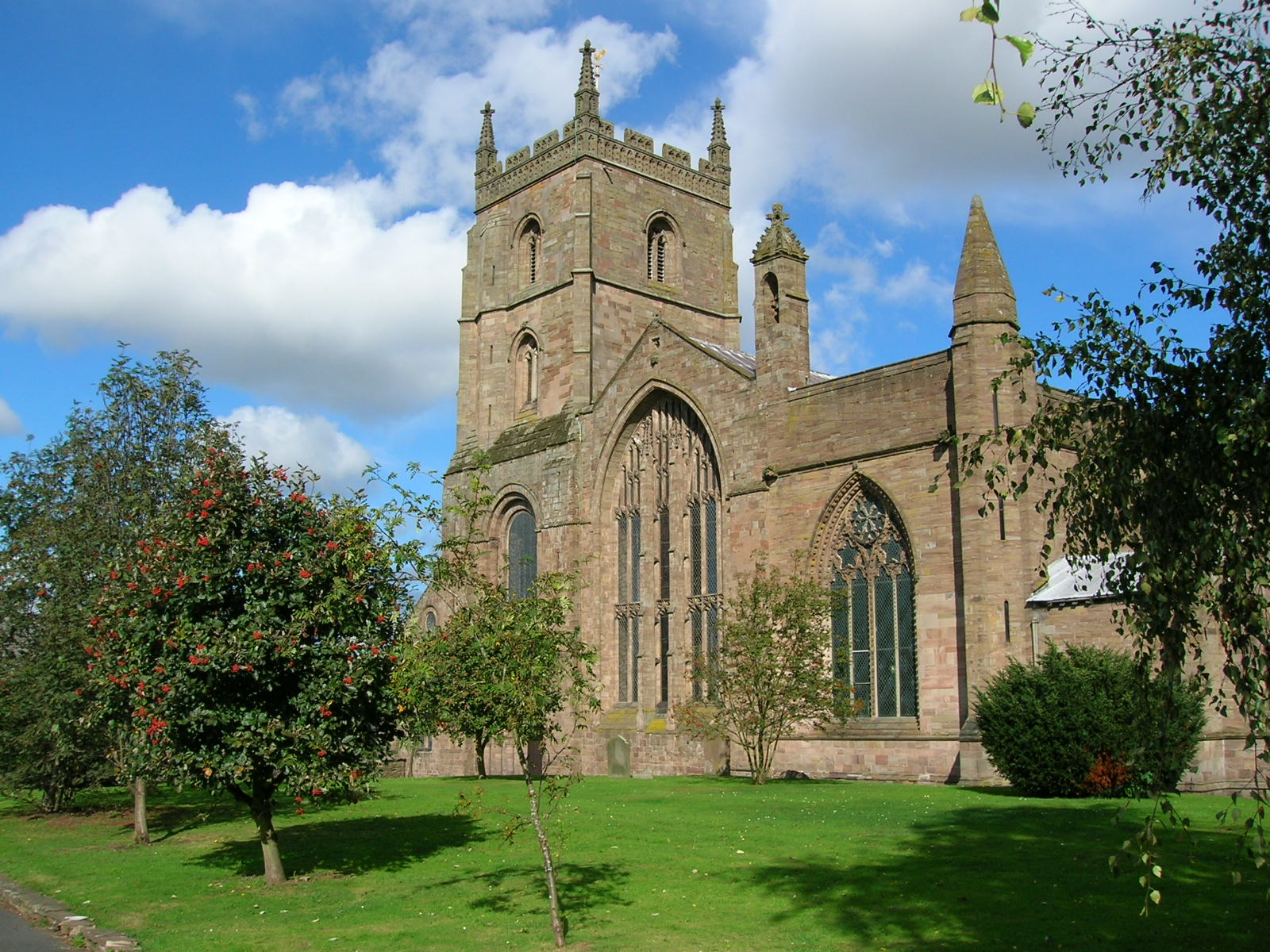
- Leominster Priory
- The Priory Church, Leominster
- Denomination: Church of England
- Website: www.leominsterpriory.org.uk

History
- Founder: Reading Abbey

Architecture
- Style: Norman and later styles

Administration
- Diocese: Diocese of Hereford

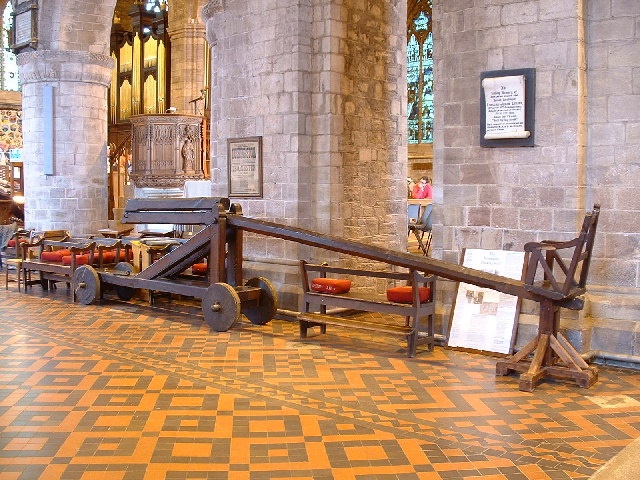
Ducking stool on display in the church

The Priory Church is an Anglican parish church in Leominster, Herefordshire, England, dedicated to Saint Peter and Saint Paul. The building was constructed for a Benedictine Priory in about the 13th century, although there had been an Anglo-Saxon monastery in Leominster, possibly on the same site. In 1539 the east end of the church was destroyed along with most of the monastic buildings, but the main body of the church was preserved.

Quatrefoil piers were inserted between 1872 and 1879 by Sir George Gilbert Scott. The building is a grade I listed building.

== Bells ==
The now peal of ten bells at the church are quite rare. The 'original' eight bells, known as the back 8, were cast in 1755 by William Evans of Chepstow, South Wales, and then transported by barge upstream via the rivers Wye and Lugg. There is only one other complete peal of 8 bells cast by William Evans at the same time at St Briavels, however these are much lighter.

In 1894 a new frame and two new bells, bells 1 & 2 of 10, were cast by John Warners of London augmenting the ring to a 10.

The Tenor weighs 22cwt 3qrts, roughly just over 1 metric ton, is in the key of E-flat.

== Churchyard ==
Investigations to the north of the priory in 2005 located the position of the cloister, although most of the stone had been taken for reuse elsewhere following the Dissolution. Discarded animal bones found on the site when submitted to carbon dating showed that the area was occupied in the 7th century. This agrees with the date of 660 CE associated with the founding myth, which suggests a Christian community was established here by a monk, St. Eadfrith, originally from Lindisfarne in Northumbria.

In the churchyard are graves and memorials of members of the theatrical Kemble family including the grandparents of actress Sarah Siddons. The churchyard also contains one war grave of a soldier of the Royal Army Service Corps of World War II.

== Historical ==
The earliest known English women doctors, Solicita and Matilda Ford, are known from charters confirming their brother John's grant of land to the priory in the late twelfth century, where they both sign themselves as medica.

== See also ==
- Leominster Abbey
- List of English abbeys, priories and friaries serving as parish churches
