= Solicita and Matilda Ford =

Anglo-Norman medical practitioners

Solicita and Matilda Ford (fl. c. 1200) are the earliest known English women doctors by 150 years. They were Anglo-Norman sisters who practiced medicine in the small settlement of Ford, Herefordshire, England, in the late twelfth century with their brother John. This indicates that medical training was shared within families. Both Solicita and Matilda Ford were designated with the Latin term, medica, distinguishing them from John, who was termed a medicus. These titles identify them as practicing physicians, indicating training. They are known from charters confirming their brother John's grant of land to Leominster Priory in the late twelfth century. Leominster Priory supported a poor hospital and a leper hospital, and several of its early benefactors were physicians.

Solicita, who was married to William of Ford, confirmed John’s donation and donated her own hereditary lands to the almoner of Leominster.

Solicita and Matilda Ford are among the only eleven women who were recorded in English medical roles over eight centuries.

== Social and Financial Standing ==
Solicita, Matilda, and their brother John had considerable wealth from operating as independent tradespeople. This prosperity appears in records of property transfer and indicates their presence in the middle levels of society. Matilda, who does not mention a husband, confirmed her charter with her own seal. Personal seals were marks legal authority and independent status, indicating a social and financial standing.
