= Bromyard railway station =

Former railway station in Herefordshire, England

Bromyard
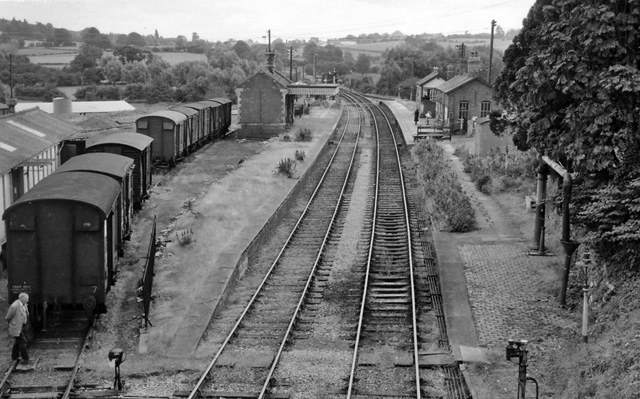
- Bromyard railway station in 1963

General information
- Location: Bromyard, Herefordshire; England
- Coordinates: 52.1907°N 2.5028°W
- Grid reference: SO657547
- Platforms: 2

Other information
- Status: Disused

History
- Original company: Worcester, Bromyard and Leominster Railway
- Pre-grouping: Great Western Railway
- Post-grouping: Great Western Railway

Key dates
- 22 October 1877: Opened
- 7 September 1964: Closed
Location

Bromyard railway station was a station in Bromyard, Herefordshire, England. The station was opened on 22 October 1877 and closed after the last train on 5 September 1964.

It became a terminus on 15 September 1952, with the closure of the Bromyard–Leominster section of the former Worcester, Bromyard and Leominster Railway.

Preceding station	Disused railways	Following station
Rowden Mill; Line and station closed	Great Western Railway; Worcester, Bromyard and Leominster Railway	Yearsett; Line and station closed
