= Yearsett railway station =

Former railway station in Herefordshire, England

Yearsett

General information
- Location: Southeast of Brockhampton, Herefordshire; England
- Coordinates: 52.1792°N 2.4287°W
- Grid reference: SO708535

Other information
- Status: Disused

History
- Original company: Worcester, Bromyard and Leominster Railway

Key dates
- 2 May 1874: Opened
- 22 October 1877: Closed
Location

Yearsett railway station was a station to the southeast of Brockhampton, Herefordshire, England. The station was opened on 2 May 1874 as a temporary terminus and closed on 22 October 1877.

Preceding station	Disused railways	Following station
Terminus	Worcester, Bromyard and Leominster Railway	Suckley; Line and station closed
