= Eadfrith of Leominster =

Anglo-Saxon Catholic saint (died 675)

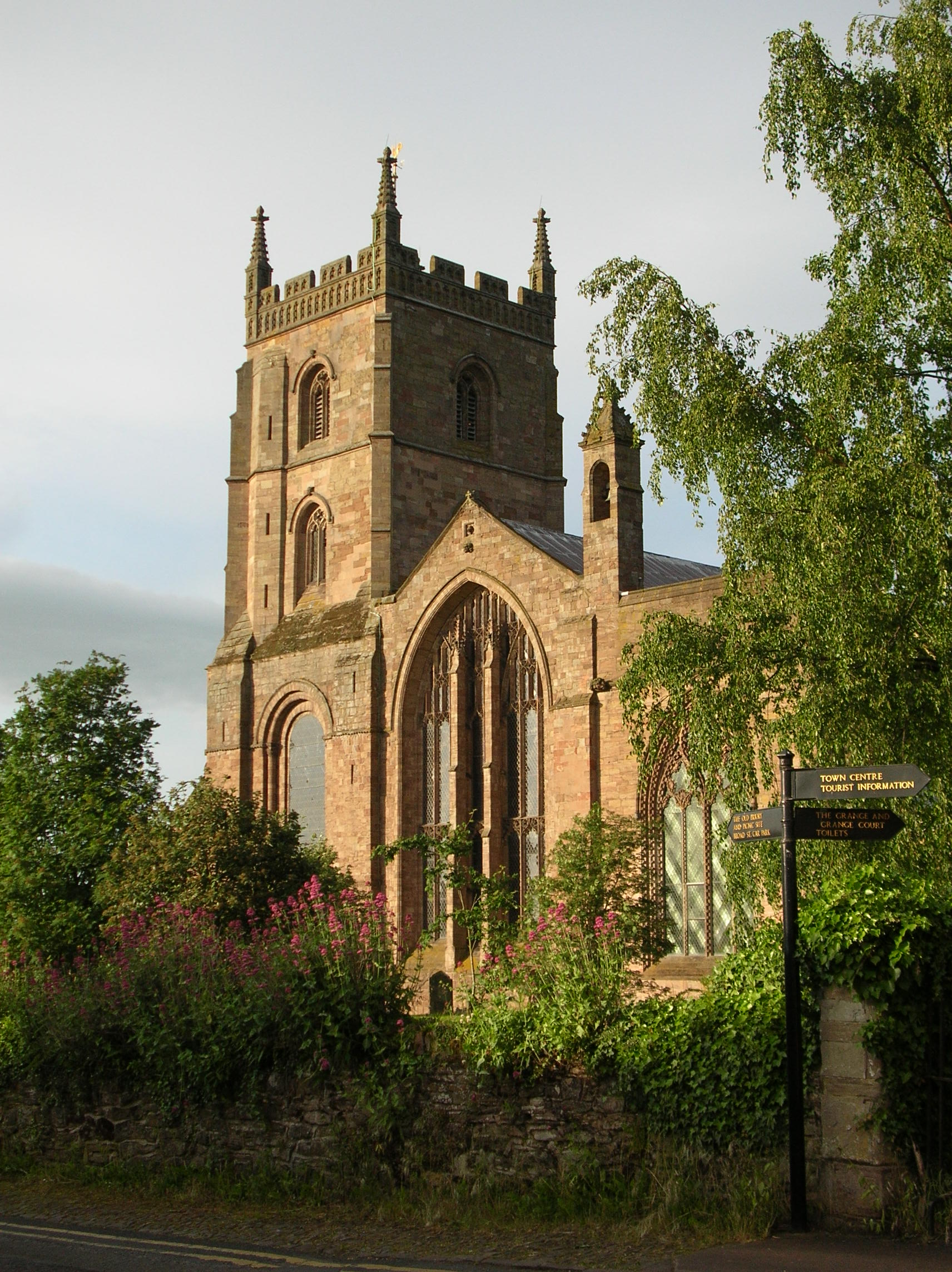
The (refounded) Priory Church building at Leominster

Eadfrith of Leominster also known as Eadridus (died 675) was a seventh century saint from Anglo-Saxon England. Although very little is known of his life and he is not mentioned in contemporary texts, stories suggest that he was an important figure in the process of Christianisation of Anglo-Saxon England.

The later foundation legend of the minster at Leominster tells that Eadfrith came from Northumbria and worked as a missionary to the Hwicce kingdom and in 660 converted King Merewalh, subregus of the Magonsæte, a contemporary (and possibly son) of King Penda of Mercia.

According to these foundation legends, Eadfrith founded Leominster Abbey for women around 660, as a conventual priory of the monks of Reading Abbey. This abbey was mentioned in the Domesday Book and was re-founded about 1139. at which time it may have been associated with the royal family.

Eadfrith is known to history mainly through the hagiography of the Secgan Manuscript, but also the Anglo-Saxon Chronicle and the Catalogus sanctorum pausantium in Anglia.

Eadfrith died in 675 and was buried in Leominster (though this burial is not listed in the resting places of saints in the aforementioned Secgan Manuscript, which lists only a St Aethelred at Leominster). His feast day is on 26 October.
