= Leominster =

Town in Herefordshire, England

Coordinates: 52.2282°N 2.7385°W

- Market town
- Leominster Priory Grange Court Corn Square

- Location within Herefordshire
- Population: 11,959 (2021 Census)
- OS grid reference: SO496591
- Civil parish: Leominster
- Unitary authority: Herefordshire
- Ceremonial county: Herefordshire
- Region: West Midlands
- Country: England
- Sovereign state: United Kingdom
- Post town: LEOMINSTER
- Postcode district: HR6
- Dialling code: 01568
- Police: West Mercia
- Fire: Hereford and Worcester
- Ambulance: West Midlands
- UK Parliament: North Herefordshire

Leominster (/ˈlɛmstər/ LEM-stər) is a market town in Herefordshire, England; it is located at the confluence of the River Lugg and its tributary the River Kenwater. The town is 12 miles (19 kilometres) north of Hereford and 7 miles (11 kilometres) south of Ludlow in Shropshire. With a population of 11,959 in 2021, Leominster is the largest of the five towns in the county; the others being Ross-on-Wye, Ledbury, Bromyard and Kington.

From 1974 to 1996, Leominster was the administrative centre for the former local government district of Leominster.

== Toponymy ==
The town, previously spelt 'Lemster', takes its name from the English word minster, meaning a community of clergy and the original Celtic name for the district Leon or Lene, probably in turn from an Old Welsh root lei to flow. The Welsh name for Leominster is Llanllieni, with Llan suggesting a possible Celtic origin to the town's religious community.

Contrary to certain reports, the name has nothing to do with Leofric, an 11th-century Earl of Mercia (most famous for being the legendarily miserly husband of Lady Godiva).

== History ==
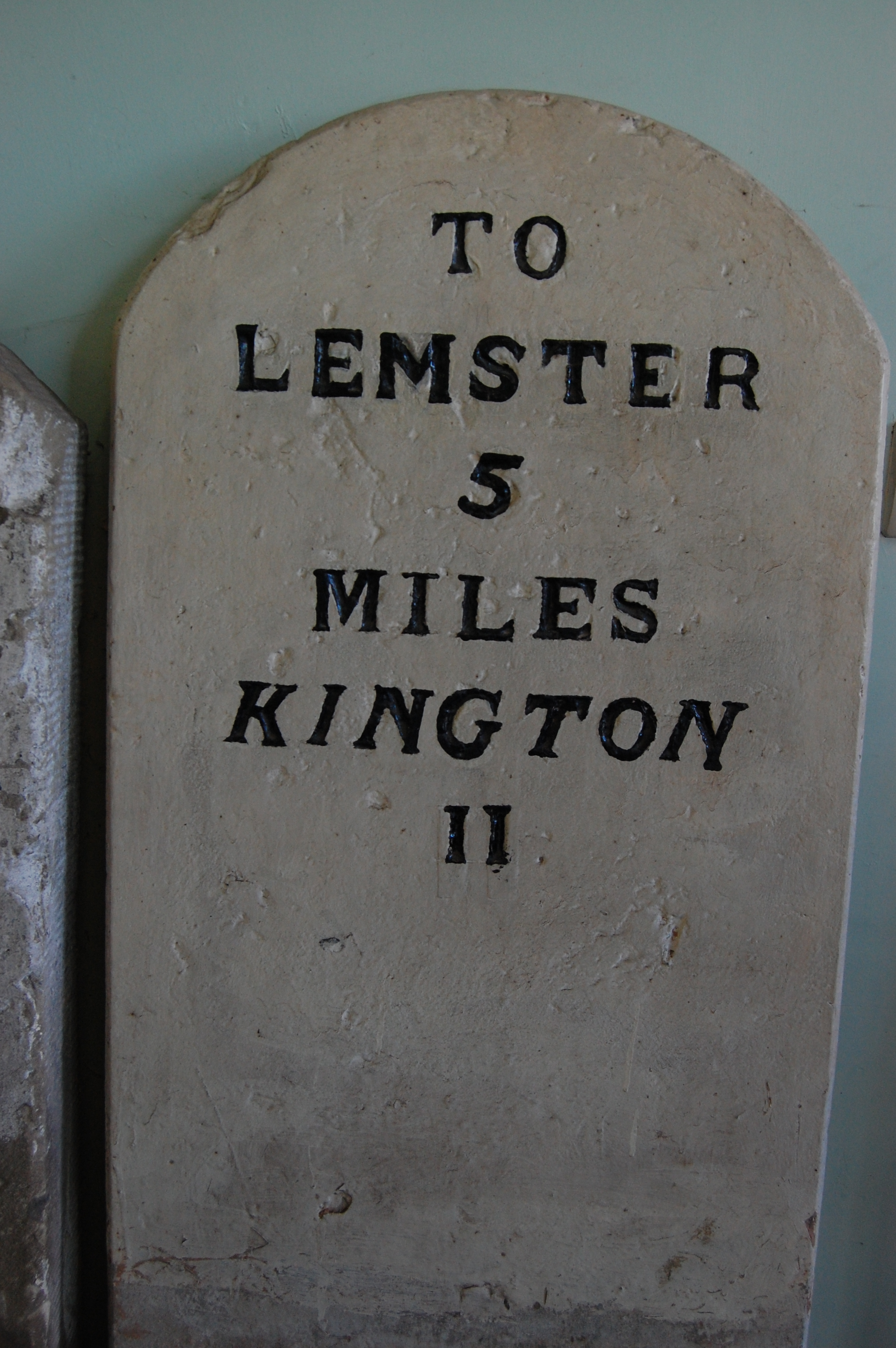
Milestone, showing the old spelling 'Lemster', now in Leominster Museum

During the Early Middle Ages, Leominster was home to Æthelmod of Leominster, an English saint known to history mainly through the hagiography of the Secgan Manuscript. He is reputedly buried in Leominster.

During the 8th and 9th Century, Danes (or Vikings) frequently raided the area. In 2015, two individuals (operating without landowner permission), using metal detectors, found a large hoard near Leominster (the Herefordshire hoard) consisting primarily of Saxon jewellery and silver ingots but also coins; the latter date to around 879 AD. According to a news report, "experts believe it was buried by a Viking during a series of raids", while Wessex was ruled by Alfred the Great and Mercia by Ceolwulf II of Mercia.

According to the Anglo-Saxon Chronicle, a raid by Gruffudd ap Llywelyn on Leominster in 1052 resulted in the Battle of Llanllieni, between the Welsh and a combined force of Normans (mercenaries) and English Saxons.

Henry I bestowed the minster and its estates on Reading Abbey, which founded a priory at Leominster in 1121, although there was one here from Saxon times. Its Priory Church of St. Peter and St. Paul, which now serves as the parish church, is the remaining part of this 12th-century Benedictine monastery. Quatrefoil piers were inserted between 1872–79 by Sir George Gilbert Scott.

The priory was ransacked by the Welsh forces of Owain Glyndŵr after their victory at the Battle of Bryn Glas near Pilleth in 1402, along with several local manor houses.

Investigations to the north of the priory in 2005 located the position of the cloister, although most of the stone had been stolen following the Dissolution. Discarded animal bones found on the site when submitted to carbon dating showed that the area was occupied in the 7th century. This agrees with the date of 660 AD associated with the founding myth, which suggests a Christian community was established here by a monk, St. Eadfrith, originally from Lindisfarne in Northumbria.

Leominster is also the historical home of Ryeland sheep, a breed once famed for its wool, known as 'Lemster ore'. This wool was prized above all other English wool in trade with the continent of Europe in the Middle Ages. It was the income and prosperity from this wool trade that established the town and the minster and attracted the envy of the Welsh and other regions.

From approximately 1748 to 1754, Pinsley Mill in Leominster was home to one of the Paul-Wyatt cotton mills, the first four cotton mills in the world, employing the spinning machines of Lewis Paul and John Wyatt. The mill was financed by Lancashire native Daniel Bourn, and was partly owned by other men from Lancashire. Bourn introduced his own version of the carding engine to work at this mill, and of the four Paul-Wyatt mills, it may have been the most successful, as shortly after the fire that destroyed the mill, it was reported that the cotton works "had been viewed with great pleasure and admiration by travellers and all who had seen them."

One of the last ordeals by ducking stool took place in Leominster in 1809, with Jenny Pipes as the final incumbent. The ducking stool is on public display in Leominster Priory; a mechanised depiction of it is featured on the town clock.

== Climate ==
The town has a maritime climate, with mild winters and summers. The data below is from a weather station in Shobdon.

Climate data for Shobdon Airfield, (Note: Weather station is located 6.0 miles (9.7 km) from the Leominster town centre.) (1991–2020 normals, extremes 1992–present)
Month	Jan	Feb	Mar	Apr	May	Jun	Jul	Aug	Sep	Oct	Nov	Dec	Year
Record high °C (°F)	14.9 (58.8)	17.2 (63.0)	22.3 (72.1)	24.6 (76.3)	26.6 (79.9)	30.8 (87.4)	35.0 (95.0)	33.1 (91.6)	29.5 (85.1)	27.2 (81.0)	18.0 (64.4)	15.2 (59.4)	35.0 (95.0)
Mean daily maximum °C (°F)	7.6 (45.7)	8.2 (46.8)	10.6 (51.1)	13.5 (56.3)	16.7 (62.1)	19.6 (67.3)	21.7 (71.1)	21.3 (70.3)	18.6 (65.5)	14.4 (57.9)	10.5 (50.9)	7.9 (46.2)	14.3 (57.7)
Daily mean °C (°F)	4.5 (40.1)	4.9 (40.8)	6.6 (43.9)	8.8 (47.8)	11.7 (53.1)	14.5 (58.1)	16.4 (61.5)	16.2 (61.2)	13.8 (56.8)	10.5 (50.9)	7.0 (44.6)	4.7 (40.5)	10.0 (49.9)
Mean daily minimum °C (°F)	1.3 (34.3)	1.5 (34.7)	2.5 (36.5)	4.1 (39.4)	6.7 (44.1)	9.4 (48.9)	11.1 (52.0)	11.0 (51.8)	8.9 (48.0)	6.6 (43.9)	3.5 (38.3)	1.4 (34.5)	5.7 (42.3)
Record low °C (°F)	−12.2 (10.0)	−9.5 (14.9)	−7.8 (18.0)	−4.9 (23.2)	−2.3 (27.9)	0.2 (32.4)	2.6 (36.7)	2.4 (36.3)	−0.7 (30.7)	−5.6 (21.9)	−9.5 (14.9)	−16.9 (1.6)	−16.9 (1.6)
Average precipitation mm (inches)	77.2 (3.04)	60.1 (2.37)	55.5 (2.19)	58.6 (2.31)	56.4 (2.22)	58.3 (2.30)	55.6 (2.19)	64.2 (2.53)	58.8 (2.31)	84.5 (3.33)	81.9 (3.22)	86.4 (3.40)	797.3 (31.39)
Average precipitation days (≥ 1.0 mm)	13.9	11.0	10.5	10.1	10.0	9.3	9.2	10.2	9.4	12.2	13.4	13.7	132.9
Mean monthly sunshine hours	55.0	83.9	118.9	165.7	213.5	195.1	214.9	168.1	149.1	103.4	68.6	56.3	1,592.4
Source 1: Met Office
Source 2: Starlings Roost Weather

== Transport ==
Leominster railway station is managed by Transport for Wales, who operate services on the Welsh Marches Line between South Wales and North West England. Direct services run to Cardiff, Hereford, Ludlow, Shrewsbury, Crewe and Manchester.

The town has a bus station which is the focal point for its bus services. Routes are operated by Lugg Valley Travel and First Worcester, which link Leominster with Hereford, Ludlow and Ledbury.

Leominster is a primary destination on Great Britain's road network, being where the north-south A49 and east-west A44 roads meet. At Leominster, roads are signed towards Rhayader (A44 westbound), Worcester (A44 eastbound), Shrewsbury (A49 northbound) and Hereford (A49 southbound).

== Schools ==
Earl Mortimer College, is a state comprehensive school providing secondary education for about 650 pupils. It was formerly known as the Minster School. There is also Leominster Primary School and Westfield's Special School. Primary schools in the villages around the town include Ivington, Kimbolton, Kingsland, Luston and Stoke Prior.

== Media ==
In print, Leominster is served by the Hereford Times, The Leominster News and the Teme Valley Times. Local TV coverage are provided by BBC West Midlands and ITV Central. Television signals are received from the Ridge Hill TV transmitter. Local radio stations are Sunshine Radio, Sunshine 855, BBC Hereford & Worcester, Hits Radio Herefordshire & Worcestershire and Greatest Hits Radio Herefordshire & Worcestershire.

== Notable people ==
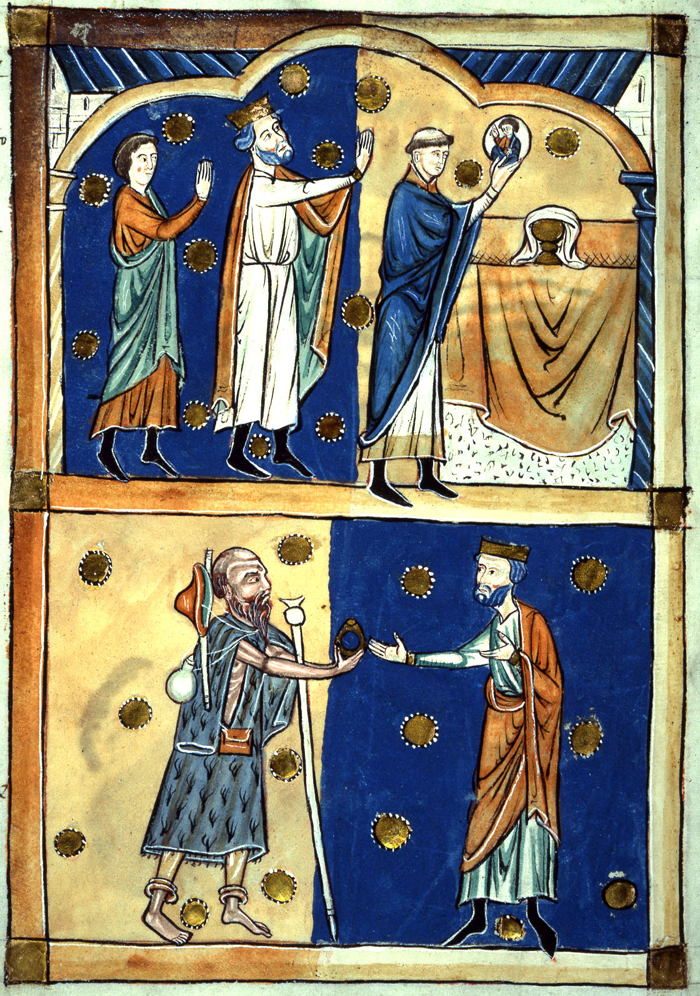
Leofric, Earl of Mercia, top right, from 13th C Domesday Book

Grange Court

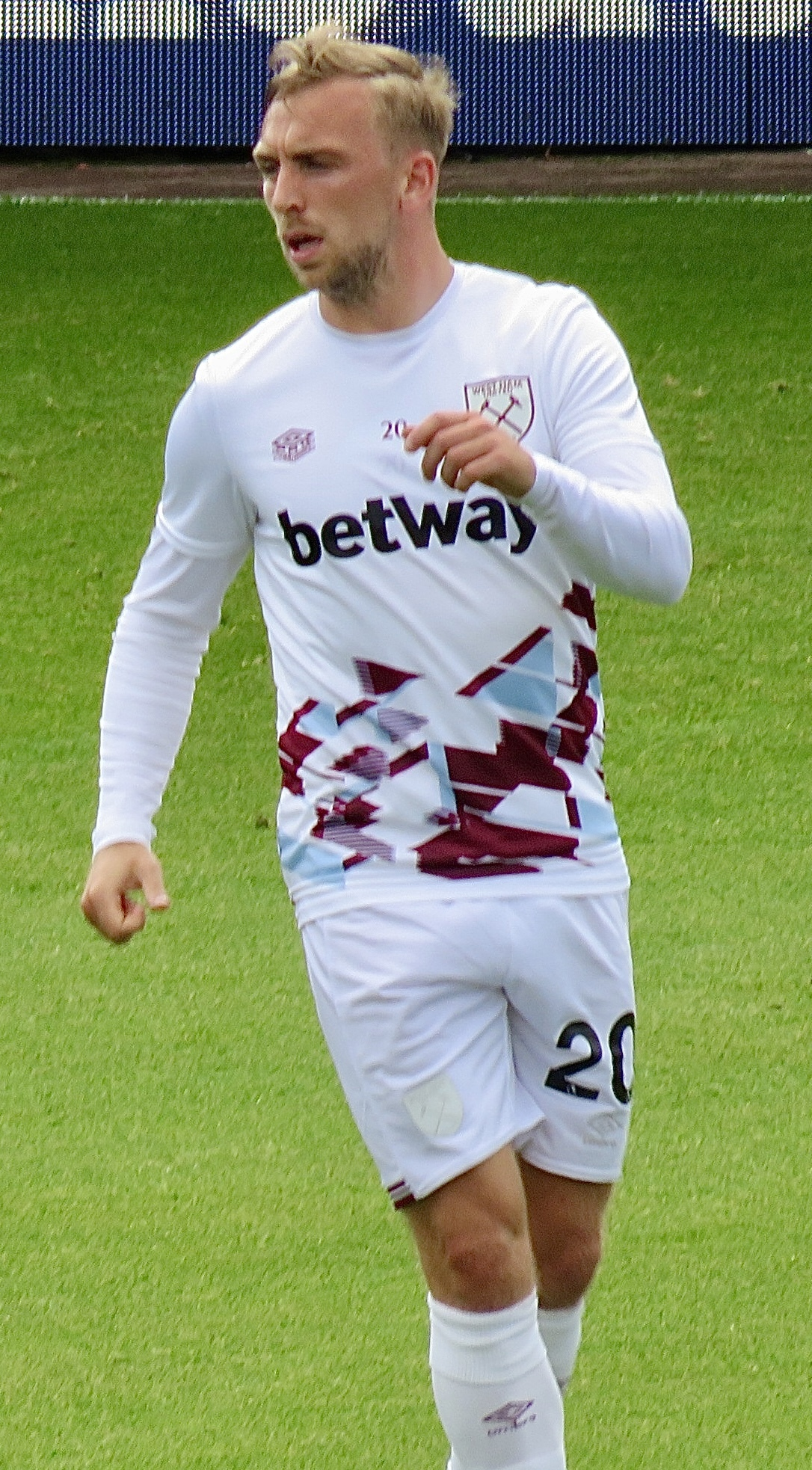
Jarrod Bowen, 2023

- Saint Cuthfleda was the abbess of Leominster nunnery and the patroness of the region. She was known for her holiness and her chaste life.
- Æthelmod of Leominster an Anglo-Saxon Saint
- Leofric, Earl of Mercia (died 1057) and his wife Godgifu Lady Godiva – are commemorated as benefactors of the monastery at Leominster
- Sir Philip Hoby (1505–1558), English Ambassador to the Holy Roman Empire and Flanders.
- Sir Thomas Hoby (1530–1566), English diplomat and translator.
- Nicholas Woodfen (1550-1586), Roman Catholic priest who was hanged, drawn and quartered at Tyburn, London in 1586.
- John Abel (1578/9–1675), carpenter and mason, entitled King's Carpenter, who was responsible for several notable ornamented half-timbered buildings, like, Grange Court (1633).
- Sir George Caswall (died 1742), banker, politician and MP for Leominster, 1717/1741.
- John Ward (1704–1773) an English actor and theatre manager.
- John Scarlett Davis (1804–1845), painter and lithographer, several of his works are in Leominster Museum.
- Frederick William Evans (1808–1893), a Shaker writer, elder in the Mount Lebanon Shaker Society.
- Richard Arkwright (1835–1918), barrister, politician and MP for Leominster, 1866-1876
- Henry Stanley Newman (1837–1912), grocer, Quaker philanthropist and author.
- Sir George Newman (1870–1948), public health physician, Quaker, the first Chief Medical Officer
- Arthur Peppercorn (1889–1951), locomotive designer
- Dorothy Bowers (1902–1948), mystery novelist and crossword puzzle compiler.
- Paddie O'Neil (1926-2010), actress and singer, was born at Leominster while her parents were appearing in a fairground there.
- Sir John Craven (1940–2022), financier, chairman of Deutsche Morgan Grenfell Group plc

=== Sport ===
- Mary Rudge (1842–1919), an English chess master.
- Harry Gill (1881–1968), gymnast, competed at the 1908 Summer Olympics
- Jarrod Bowen (born 1996), footballer played over 340 games including 210 for West Ham United and 20 for England.

== Twin towns ==
Leominster is twinned with Saverne in eastern France and Tengeru in Tanzania.

== Local attractions ==
- Croft Castle
- Berrington Hall
- Grange Court
- Priory Church, Leominster
- Queen's Wood Country Park

== See also ==
- Leominster (UK Parliament constituency)
