= GWR Toad =

Class of brake van on Great Western Railway

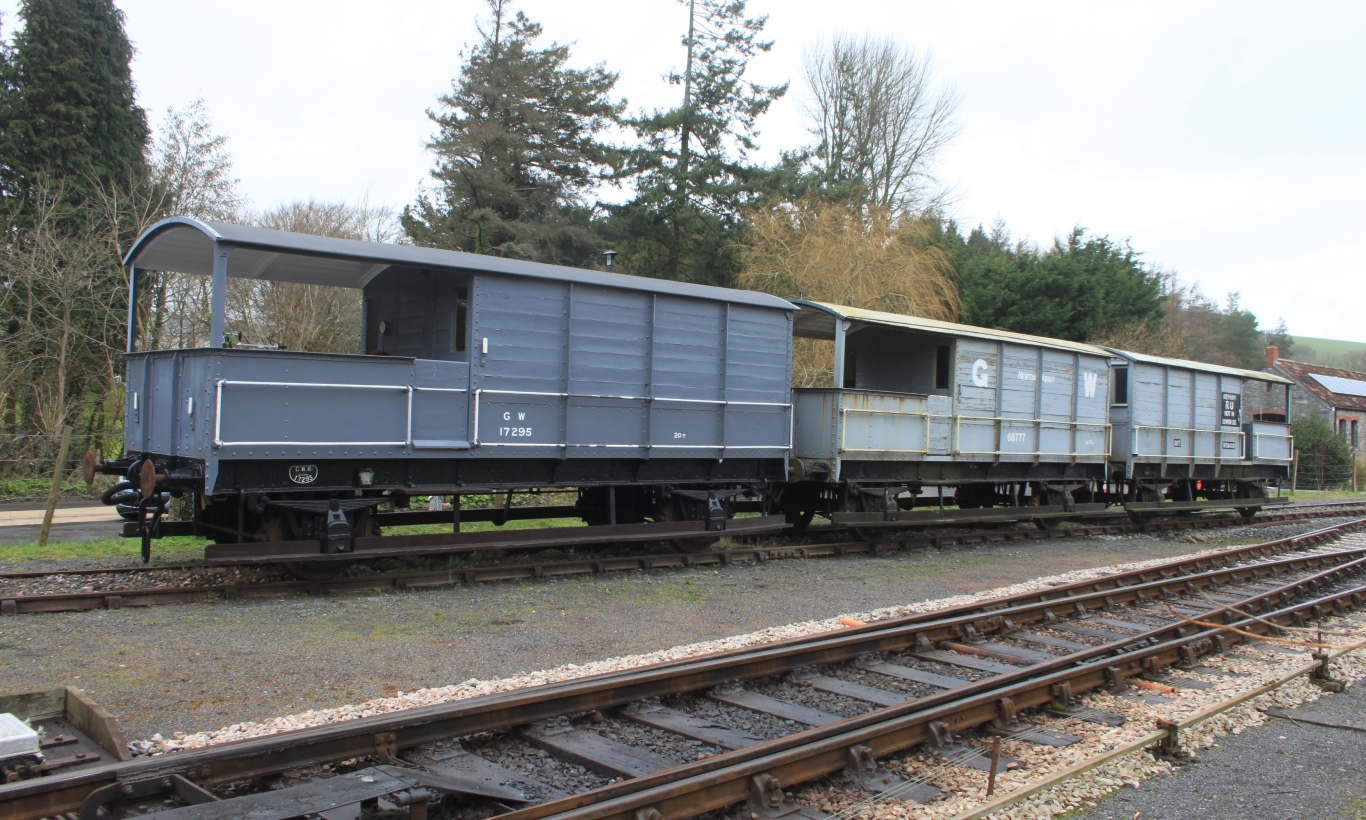
3 "Toad" brake vans of the Great Western Railway

The GWR Toad is a class of railway brake van, designed by and built for the Great Western Railway. Used by the GWR from 1894, and post-1947 by the Western Region of British Railways, its role was a safety brake on goods trains in the West of England, the Midlands and Wales.

No longer in operational use by Network Rail, a number have survived through preservation and on many heritage railways, owing to the design, which incorporates a long, open veranda and large enclosed cabin; this makes the Toad an ideal, cheap, and versatile passenger carriage.

== Background ==
By Her Majesty's Railway Inspectorate law, every goods train needed a brake van attached at the end of it. This was because most wagons were only fitted with hand brakes, and so the brake van had an important part to play in the safe running of goods trains by adding additional braking capacity. Once trains fitted with vacuum brakes were introduced (from 1904 on the GWR), a guard was required to travel at the rear of every train to ensure that it stayed as one train.

== Design ==
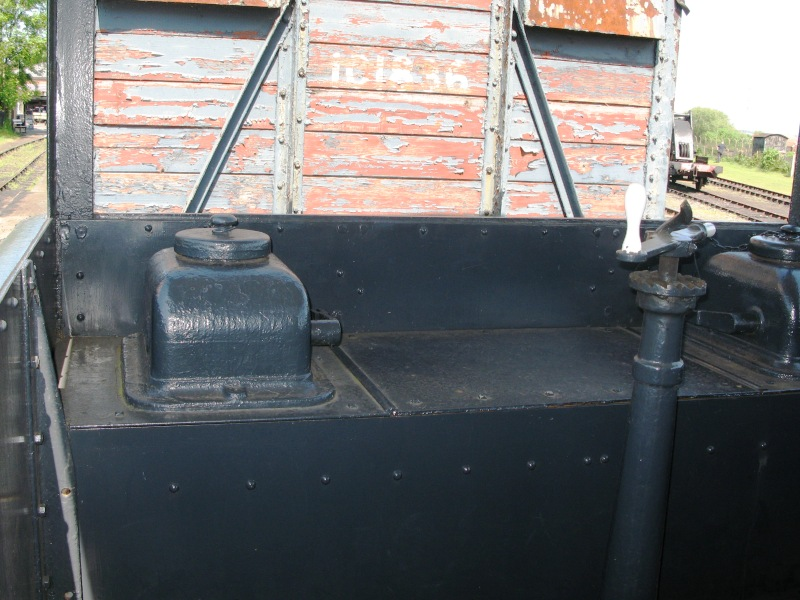
Sand boxes and hand brake on the veranda

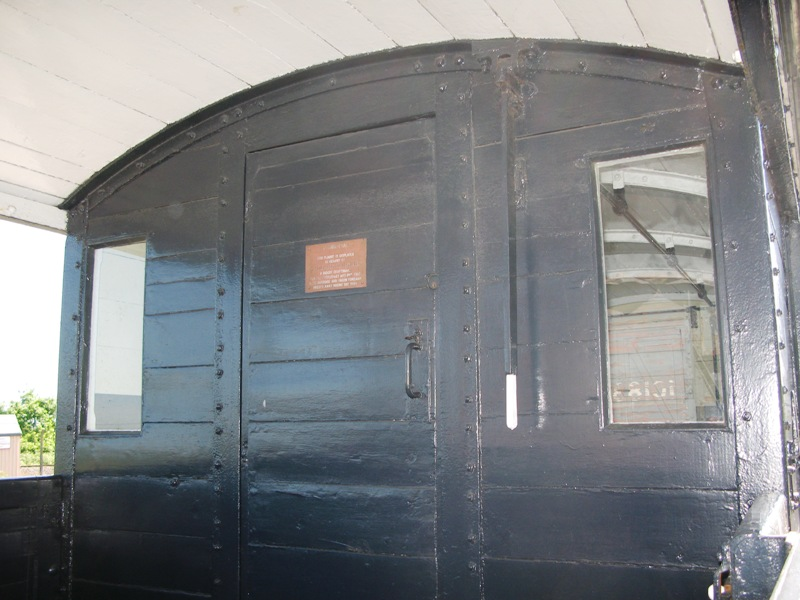
The handle for operating the sand boxes

The standard GWR brake van design dates from 1894, with many varieties built between 1894 and the early 1950s. Early vans were just 10 or 12 tons weight, but this gradually increased to 20 tons.

Each Toad had a large guards compartment/cabin extending about two-thirds of the length of the van, with the remaining "veranda" open on three sides, but covered with a roof. Full length external footboards and hand rails allowed the guard or a shunter to ride on the outside during shunting movements. On the veranda, in addition to the screw brake handle, sand boxes were fitted to the rear to allow the guard to sand the rails if necessary, to stop the wheels slipping. A full height door allowed access from the veranda to the cabin, matched by a door on the far end of cabin in most versions.

Whilst all versions had side entrances on both sides onto the veranda, some versions included additional full height side doors into the cabin. Inside the cabin were tool boxes, cupboards, a light and other electrical systems powered by an axle mounted dynamo, a seat, a combined table/desk (often two, with one collapsible) and a stove powered by wood or coal collected from the lineside. Another two sandboxes were also fitted inside the 'closed' end of the van, operated by a linkage from the veranda when travelling with the veranda trailing.

The guard was first aid trained, and so the cabin contained the train's main first aid kit. Like the roof, the inside of the cabin was painted white for safety reasons, derived from the practice of the time in hospitals. Windows in both ends of the cabin allowed the guard to see out and monitor the train, but actual operations were only possible from the open veranda, which exposed them to the elements all year round.

Most Toads carried the name of their home depot on the side. The GWR had a practice of allocating Toads to fixed runs, allowing the allocated guards to build up experience on a particular route, and hence increase safety.

== Derivatives ==
Specialised types included AA8 which had a low, central body to allow forward visibility (for the banking locomotive) on the steeply-graded Pontnewynydd line in south Wales; it had an open veranda at each end. AA7 were small 12 ton vans for working over the Metropolitan Railway’s underground lines to Smithfield Market. AA4 were fully enclosed vans for working through the lengthy Severn Tunnel. Other fully enclosed vans were built for use on permanent way trains and were given diagram AA6. The next batch of permanent way vans were rated at 25 tons and fitted with ploughs to spread newly laid ballast (AA10). Diagram AA23 was the last GWR design of Toad, and several vans from this lot of 326 never saw GWR service, having been completed under British Railways.

== Withdrawal ==
In 1968, the requirement for fully fitted freight trains to end with a guard's van was lifted. From this point onwards, the guard was allowed to ride in the rearmost locomotive cab, giving a good view of the whole train. By this point in time: the Beeching cuts had reduced by two thirds the amount of trackage in the UK; most steam locomotives had been withdrawn; the quantity of wagon-load freight services was in decline; and most British Railways diesel and electric locomotives had cabs at both ends. As a result, although still required for unfitted trains, there was less operational need for so many brake vans, and like many designs the GWR Toads were withdrawn.

A Toad brake van that was built in 1877 survived on the Kent & East Sussex Railway as No. 24 until withdrawn and scrapped in 1944.

== Preservation ==
A sturdy and well built design offering a large enclosed open area, many Toads initially survived into a new life on industrial railways through being deemed "safe" by HM Railway Inspectorate to be used for the transport of workers. It was deemed effectively a small railway carriage.

This generic safety approval was noted and followed initially by many railway preservation societies, who bought Toads to offer ride-on experiences on their developing lines. Hence the number of Toads that survived into preservation versus a number of other pre-grouping designs, and later British railways types, is relatively high.

List of preserved GWR Toad brake vans
| No. | Image | Built | Date | Lot No. | Style | First allocation | Last allocation | Current location | Notes |
|---|---|---|---|---|---|---|---|---|---|
| 17293 | | Swindon Works | 1943 | 1383 | AA20 | | | Northampton & Lamport Railway | |
| 17294 | | Swindon Works | 1943 | 1383 | AA20 | | | Dean Forest Railway | |
| 17295 | | Swindon Works | | | AA21 | | | South Devon Railway | |
| 17391 | | Swindon Works | 1939 | | AA21 | | | Bristol Harbour Railway | |
| 17392 | | Swindon Works | | | | | | Gloucestershire Warwickshire Railway | |
| 17436 | | Swindon Works | 1940 | | AA21 | | | Mangapps Railway Museum | |
| 17438 | | | | | | | | Mid-Norfolk Railway | Private Owner |
| 17447 | | Swindon Works | 1940 | 1370 | AA21 | | | Didcot Railway Centre | |
| 17464 | | Swindon Works | 1940 | 1370 | AA21 | | | Avon Valley Railway | GWR 813 Preservation Fund owned van. |
| 17861 | | Swindon Works | 1914 | 779 | AA13 | | | Swanage Railway | Converted to Messing and Sleeping Van in BR Departmental Service |
| 17908 | | Swindon Works | 1913 | | AA13 | Cardiff | | | Previously at the Bluebell Railway. Offered for disposal in 2025 and left the railway 7 October 2025. |
| 35290 | | Swindon Works | 1946 | | AA23 | | | Museum of the Great Western Railway | |
| 35377 | | Swindon Works | 1948 | | AA23 | | | Llanelli and Mynydd Mawr Railway | |
| 35420 | | Swindon Works | | | | | | South Devon Railway | |
| 35907 | | Swindon Works | 1944 | | AA23 | | | Watercress Line | Mostly used for DOWT events. |
| 40362 | | Swindon Works | 1895 | | AA6 | Hereford | | Severn Valley Railway | Fully enclosed permanent way derivative |
| 56400 | | Swindon Works | 1900 | | AA3 | | | Didcot Railway Centre | |
| 56428 | | Swindon Works | 1900 | | AA3 | | | Mangapps Railway Museum | |
| 56769 | | Swindon Works | | | AA15 | | | Dean Forest Railway | |
| 68500 | | Swindon Works | 1947 | | AA23 | | | Great Central Railway | |
| 68501 | | Swindon Works | 1925 | 932 | AA15 | | | Severn Valley Railway | GWR 813 Preservation Fund owned van. |
| 68684 | | Swindon Works | 1924 | | AA15 | Hayle | | Didcot Railway Centre | |
| 68765 | | Swindon Works | 1939 | 1277 | AA20 | | | West Somerset Railway | GWR 813 Preservation Fund owned van. |
| 68777 | | Swindon Works | 1939 | | AA20 | Newton Abbot | | South Devon Railway | |
| 68784 | | Swindon Works | 1939 | 1277 | AA20 | | | Avon Valley Railway | GWR 813 Preservation Fund owned van. |
| 68786 | | | | | | Exeter | | South Devon Railway | |
| 114751 | | Swindon Works | 1934 | 1171 | AA20 | | Leyton Midland Road, East London | West Somerset Railway | GWR 813 Preservation Fund owned van. |
| | | Swindon Works | | | | | Manchester Ship Canal | Gloucester Docks | |
| 950592 | | Swindon Works | 1950 | 1641 | AA23 | | | Didcot Railway Centre | |

== In fiction ==
In The Railway Series children's books by the Reverend W. Awdry and the TV series Thomas & Friends, a brake van character named Toad is based on and named after the GWR Toad.
