= Leominster railway station =

Railway station in Herefordshire, England

Leominster
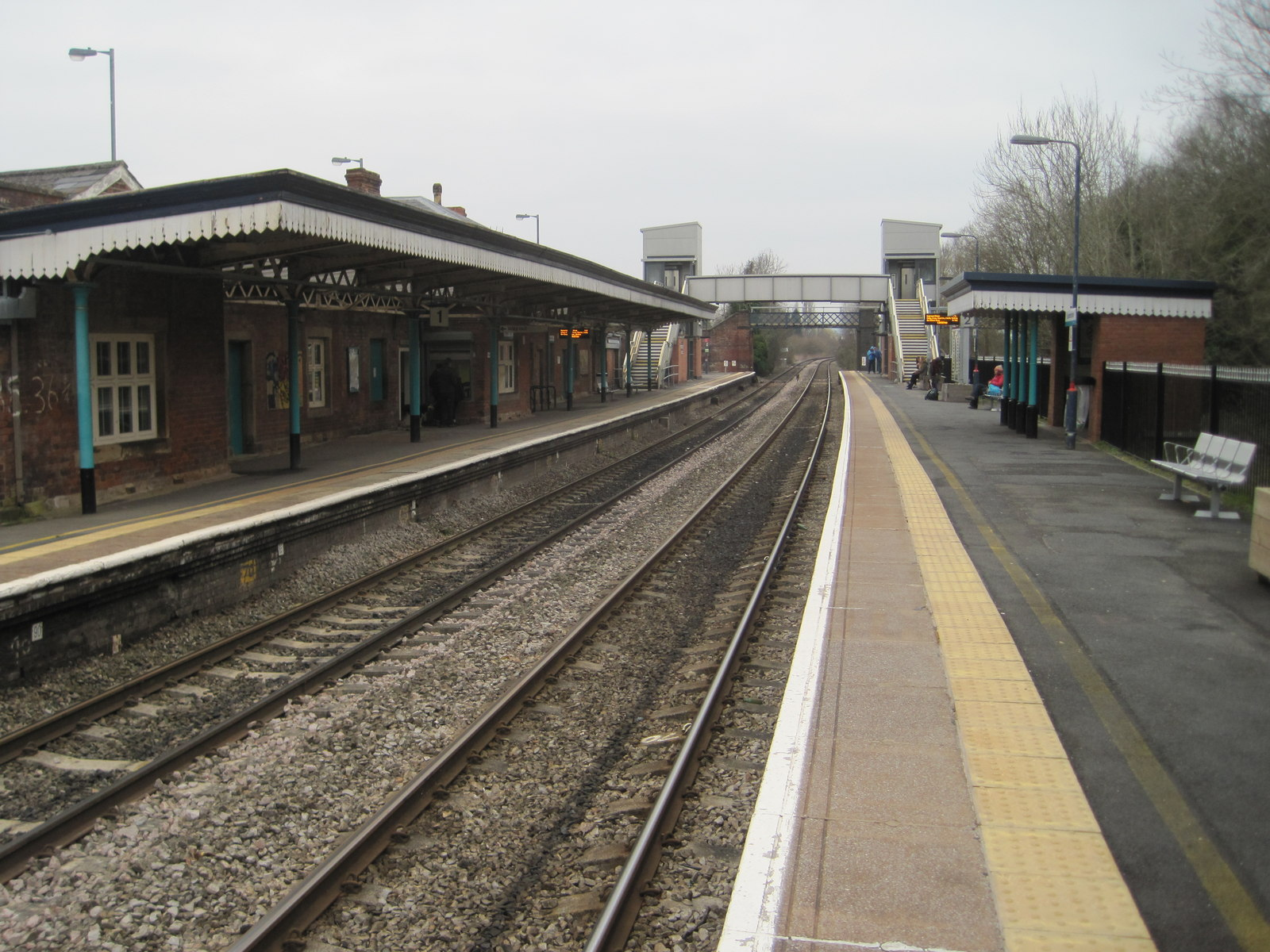

General information
- Location: Leominster, Herefordshire; England
- Coordinates: 52.225°N 2.730°W
- Grid reference: SO501588
- Manager: Transport for Wales
- Platforms: 2

Other information
- Station code: LEO
- Classification: DfT category E

Passengers
- 2020/21: ▼0.107 million
- 2021/22: ▲0.231 million
- 2022/23: ▲0.245 million
- 2023/24: ▼0.238 million
- 2024/25: ▲0.260 million
Location
Notes
- Passenger statistics from the Office of Rail and Road

Leominster railway station lies on the Welsh Marches Line, serving the town of Leominster in Herefordshire, England. It is situated 11 1/4 miles (18.1 km) north of Hereford. The station has two operational platforms, for northbound services via Ludlow and southbound via Hereford; in the past, it had three more for discontinued services to Worcester and Kington.

== History ==
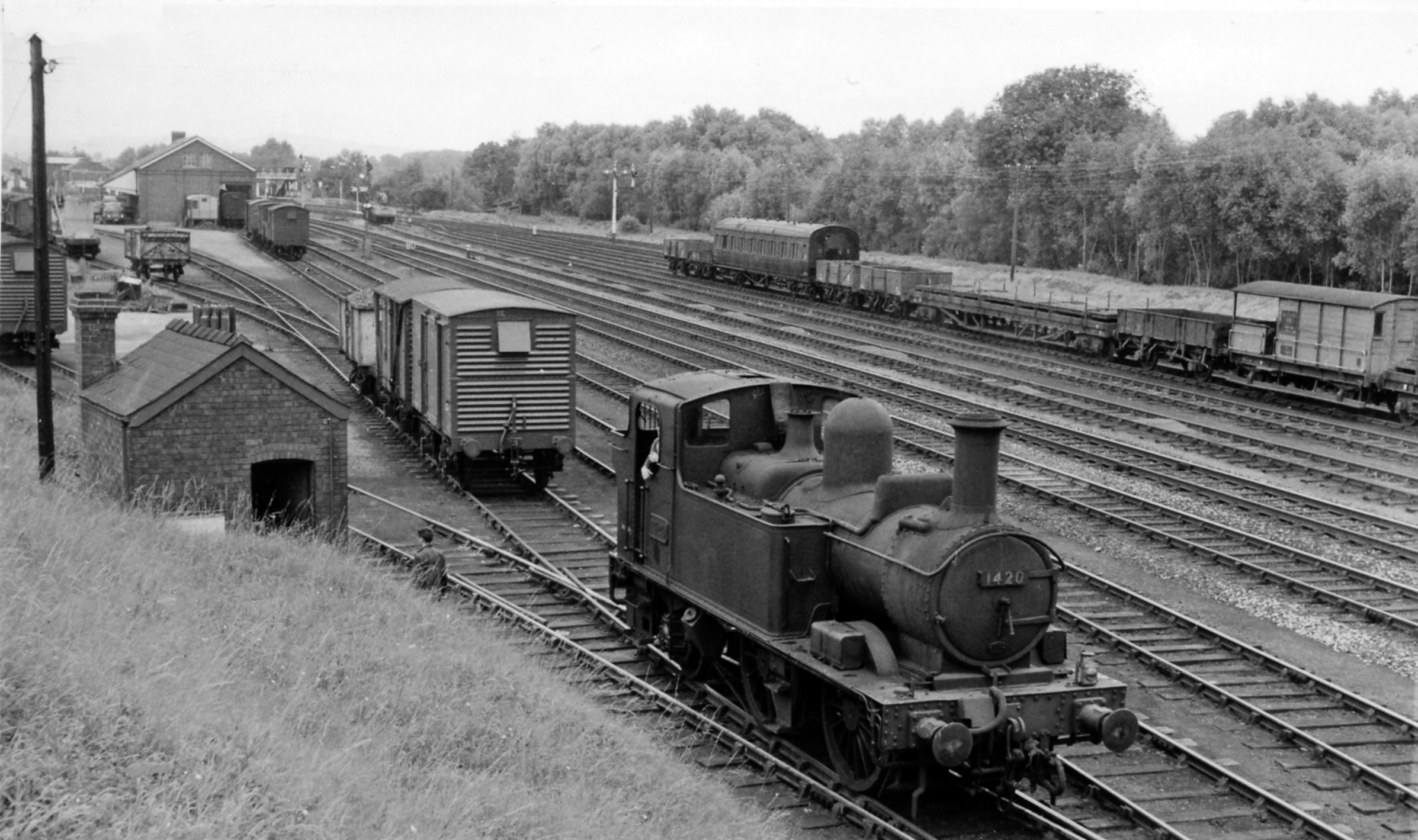
GW 0-4-2T in the goods yard in 1963

Developed jointly by the GWR and the LNWR, it was originally a through station on their Shrewsbury and Hereford Railway. The GWR then took over two independently financed and developed branch lines, creating a busy junction station:

- Leominster and Kington Railway to Kington and Presteigne (platforms 3/4)
- Worcester, Bromyard and Leominster Railway to Worcester Shrub Hill (platforms 4/5)

Both branches were closed to passenger traffic by British Railways in the 1950s; services to Worcester ended in 1952 and to Kington in 1955.

== Facilities ==
The station has a ticket office on platform 1, which is staffed on a part-time basis on weekdays only (06:55 – 13:25). There is a self-service ticket machine provided for use outside of these times and for collecting pre-paid tickets. It is reported to be operated independently of Transport for Wales.

Platform 2 has a shelter, with customer help points, digital information displays and automatic announcements provided to offer train running details on both sides. Though the footbridge linking the platforms has stairs, level access is provided to each platform.

== Service ==
Leominster has the following general Monday-Saturday off-peak service, with all trains operated by Transport for Wales:

- 1 train per hour (tph) to Manchester Piccadilly, calling at Ludlow, Craven Arms, Church Stretton, Shrewsbury, Crewe, Wilmslow and Stockport; some trains also call at Whitchurch and Nantwich).
- 1 tph to Carmarthen, calling at Hereford, Abergavenny, Cwmbran, Newport, Cardiff Central, Bridgend, Port Talbot Parkway, Neath, Swansea, Llanelli and Pembrey and Burry Port.
  - This journey is extended to Milford Haven every two hours, calling at Whitland, Clunderwen (request stop), Clarbeston Road (request stop), Haverfordwest and Johnston (request stop).

On Sundays, there is also an hourly service each way from mid-morning; this include a departure northbound to Chester and Holyhead in the late afternoon.

Preceding station	National Rail	Following station
Hereford	Transport for Wales; Welsh Marches Line	Ludlow
	Disused railways	
Kingsland; Line and station closed	Great Western Railway; Leominster and Kington Railway	Terminus
Terminus	Great Western Railway; Worcester, Bromyard and Leominster Railway	Stoke Prior Halt; Line and station closed

== Bibliography ==
- Marshall, Geoff; Pipe, Vicki (2018). The Railway Adventures: Places, Trains, People and Stations. September Publishing. ISBN 978-1910463871.
- Mitchell, Vic; Smith, Keith (2004). Worcester to Hereford. West Sussex: Middleton Press. figs. 40–42. ISBN 9781904474388. OCLC 862604858.
- Mitchell, Vic; Smith, Keith (2007). Ludlow to Hereford. Middleton Press. pp. 25–34. ISBN 9781906008147. OCLC 258060509.
