= Worcester, Bromyard and Leominster Railway =

Former railway in England

The Worcester, Bromyard and Leominster Railway was a 24.5-mile (39.4 km) single track branch railway line, that ran between a junction near Bransford Road on the West Midland Railway line south of Worcester (present day Cotswold Line) to the Shrewsbury and Hereford Railway line south of Leominster.

== History ==
=== Construction ===
Worcester, Bromyard and Leominster Railway Act 1861
- Act of Parliament
- Parliament of the United Kingdom
- Long title: An Act for making a Railway from the West Midland Railway at Bransford Bridge in the County of Worcester to the Shrewsbury and Hereford Railway near Leominster in the County of Hereford, and for other Purposes.
- Citation: 24 & 25 Vict. c. ccxiii

Dates
- Royal assent: 1 August 1861

The Worcester, Bromyard and Leominster Railway Act 1861 (24 & 25 Vict. c. ccxiii) received royal assent on 1 August 1861, authorising a single track 24.5-mile (39.4 km) railway line from a point near Bransford Road on the West Midland Railway, through Bromyard to the Shrewsbury and Hereford Railway at Leominster. Authority was given for £200,000 capital to be raised by the selling of £10 shares, with a quarter to be purchased by the West Midland Railway, plus an additional £65,000 in loans if necessary.

The limited company was formed under the chairmanship of Sir Charles Hastings, founder of the British Medical Association. Originally authorised to be constructed in five years, it eventually took 36 years to construct the complete line, opened in four sections, finishing in 1897.

In a special general meeting in March 1864, it was revealed that the company had already spent £20,000, yet neither had all the land been purchased nor had the construction contract been signed. The shareholders voted for the board to apply for an extension, which was agreed until 1869. Construction work on the line ceased in December 1866 when the contractor was declared bankrupt, with the contract re-let to a Mr. Jackson for completion by January 1867. In June 1867, with only £67 cash left in the company's accounts, a plea was made by the company to local farmers, tenants and landowners. By 1869, the company had made a successful application to the Board of Trade for a certificate allowing them to abandon the plans for the Bromyard to Leominster section, and a further extension to 28 June 1871.

The company was kept afloat when in 1870 the Great Western Railway agreed it would work the line. Built by new contractor Mr Riddy, a first section from Bromyard Junction to Yearsett (3-mile (4.8 km) east of Bromyard) finally opened in May 1874. The remaining 3-mile (4.8 km) to Bromyard were completed in 1877. Opened on Monday 22 October 1877, it had cost £17,000/mile to build. With workings sub-contracted to the GWR, a special 14 carriage train left Worcester Shrub Hill at noon, arriving in Bromyard at 1pm.

=== Leominster and Bromyard Railway ===
Leominster and Bromyard Railway Act 1874
- Act of Parliament
- Parliament of the United Kingdom
- Long title: An Act to incorporate a Company for making a Railway from the Shrewsbury and Hereford Railway at Leominster to join the Worcester, Bromyard, and Leominster Railway at Bromyard; and for other purposes.
- Citation: 37 & 38 Vict. c. clxxiii

Dates
- Royal assent: 30 July 1874

Text of statute as originally enacted

In 1874, a new company was formed, the Leominster and Bromyard Railway Company, authorised by the Leominster and Bromyard Railway Act 1874 (37 & 38 Vict. c. clxxiii) to construct 12-mile (19 km) from Bromyard to Leominster. It had to raise £210,000, with authorisation for an additional £70,000 via a mortgage if needed.

At this end of the line, a section from Leominster to Steens Bridge was completed in 1884.

=== Operation ===
Although locally popular, the line rarely made a profit, and the operating company went into liquidation. The Great Western Railway Act 1888 (51 & 52 Vict. c. cci) authorised the Great Western Railway to acquire the Worcester, Bromyard and Leominster Railway from the liquidator for £20,000, along with the Leominster and Bromyard Railway. The GWR eventually completed the line and opened the remaining stations in 1897.

Traffic was light, although by 1932 three trains ran the line on a Sunday, and certain events drove the traffic greatly higher. The Bromyard Races were a popular event, and in 1884 almost 7,000 people turned out to see them, most via train. The line was also used by seasonal hop-pickers in September, seeking temporary work. In 1929 Stoke Prior Halt was opened between Leominster and Steens Bridge.

Passenger service was worked by a GWR Autocoach powered by GWR Class 517 0-4-2T locomotive, with GWR Pannier 0-6-0PT's used for freight. In later years more modern locomotives were introduced, and on occasions a GWR diesel railcar.

In the late 1940s, a coal wagon was being shunted in Fencote's yard to the down platform, the highest station on the line at 685 feet (209 m) above sea level. The wagon's hand brake failed, and it started to accelerate towards Leominster. Passing 2.5-mile (4.0 km) later through Steens Bridge at a speed in excess of 60 miles per hour (97 km/h), the decision was made by the signal men to set the tracks so that the wagon continued to Leominster engine shed siding. When the wagon arrived, it smashed the buffer stop, breaking itself into pieces and spilling coal down the river bank.

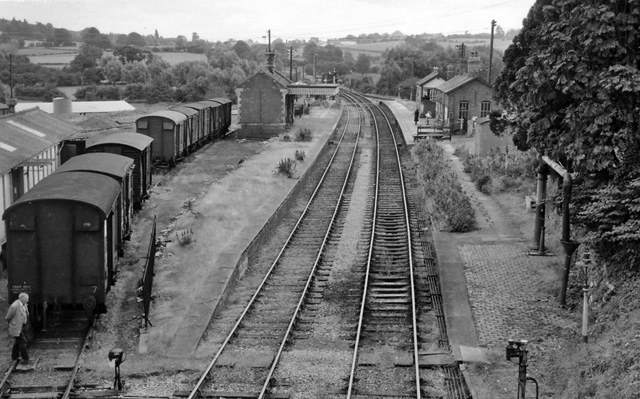
A view of Bromyard southeast towards Worcester on 13 August 1963, showing the storage of disused and soon to be scrapped vans and wagons

=== Closure ===
After World War II, with the greater use of the motorbus and private cars, traffic on the line fell considerably. The stations all became unstaffed from September 1949, and the line between Bromyard and Leominster closed to regular passenger services on 15 September 1952.

On 26 April 1958 a special train organised by the Stephenson Locomotive Society ran from Worcester via Bromyard to Leominster, calling at Rowden Mill, Fencote and Steens Bridge. Headed by ex-GWR 4500 Class 2-6-2T No.4571, the 50 society members/passengers rode on the last train to run on the complete route.

The Worcester to Bromyard section was closed under the Beeching cuts in 1964. The line was removed in 1965, with the track bed being offered for sale for £54,000 but there were no takers.

== Present ==
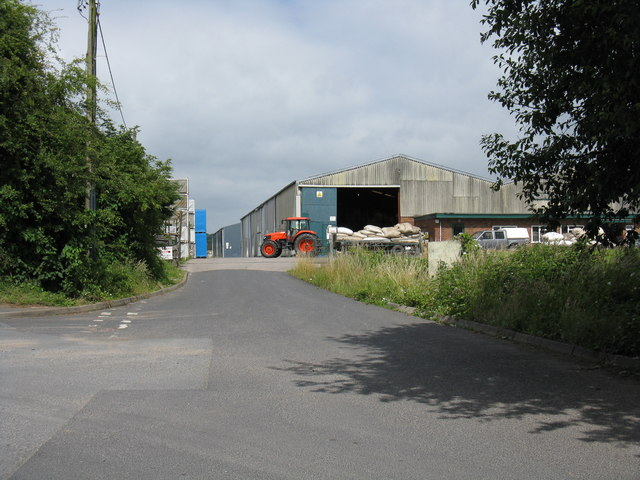
The former site of Bromyard railway station, now redeveloped as a light industrial estate

After being closed, most of the line was sold off to the original private land owners.

North beyond Stoke Prior Halt, the track ran parallel for over a mile to the Shrewsbury and Hereford line, which was redeveloped as part of the Leominster bypass.

Of the stations, Steens Bridge has been redeveloped as a housing estate, with semi-detached bungalows built along the line of the platforms edge. Leigh Court is now a derelict shell covered in ivy and Suckley is a private residence. Fencote and Rowden Mill are noticed below.

=== Bromyard and Linton Light Railway ===
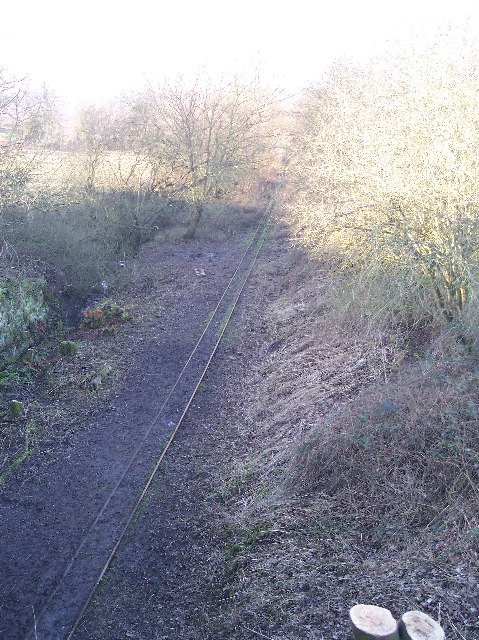
The overgrown tracks of the 2 ft (610 mm) Bromyard and Linton Light Railway

The Bromyard and Linton Light Railway is a 1 mile (1.6 km) long 2 ft (610 mm) line. The former site of Bromyard station has been redeveloped as an industrial estate, but beyond the former railway bridge on part of the original BR sidings, Bob Palmer built the 2 ft track along the old rights of way towards Worcester as far as the Avenbury Lane bridge. Not normally open to the public, it was occasionally open as a static museum. The rolling stock consisted mainly of Motor-Rails and Ruston diesel-powered engines, and a singular Peckett and Sons steam locomotive, No.1327 0-6-0ST of 1913 named Mesozoic. This train originally ran on the Southam Cement railway in Warwickshire. Presently closed, it is hoped to reopen the railway to allow public access.

=== Rowden Mill ===
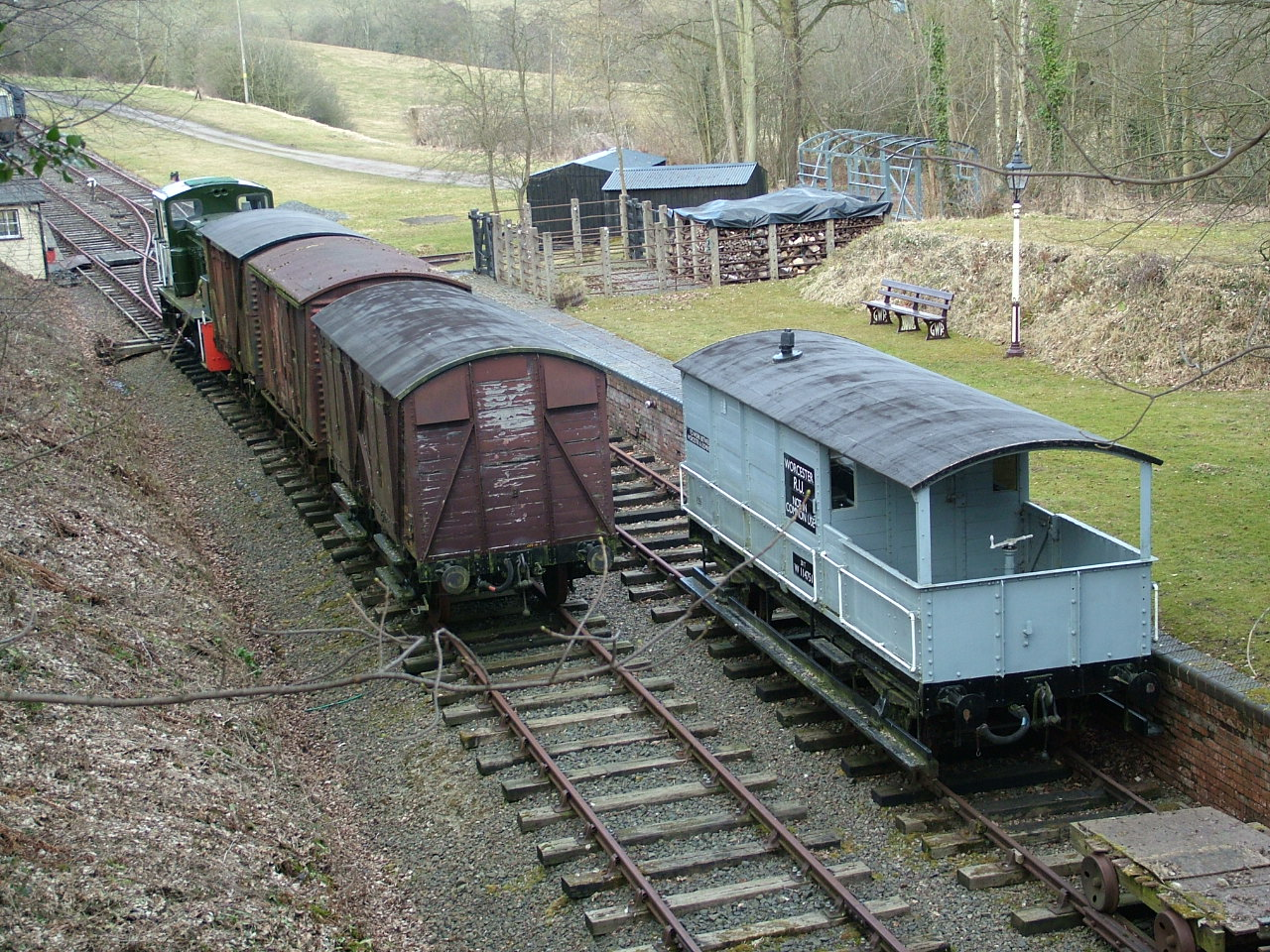
View of Rowden Mill station in 2010, showing British Rail Class 03 shunter No.D2371, GWR Toad brake van and various wagons

Rowden Mill station was bought and restored as a private residence by John Wilkinson. He re-installed sections of the track either side of the station, on which are presently housed British Rail Class 03 shunter No.D2371, various Wickham self-propelled trolleys, some carriages, goods wagons and a GWR Toad brake van. At private gatherings, the stock is propelled along the line, while the site is opened occasionally for public access and viewing, but without operational trains.

=== Fencote ===
Mr K Matthews who owns Fencote station, has restored it to a standard similar to Rowden Mill. No track extends between the two stations.

== Bibliography ==
- Smith, William (1998). The Bromyard Branch: From Worcester to Leominster. Kidderminster Railway Museum. ISBN 0-9534775-0-9.
