= Stephen Devereux of Bodenham and Burghope =

Stephen Devereux
- Born: c. 1290
- Died: 1350
- Spouse: Cicely
- Issue: Walter Devereux of Bodenham; William Devereux of Bodenham
- Father: Walter Devereux of Bodenham
- Mother: Margery de Braose

Stephen Devereux (died 1350) of Bodenham and Burghope was a member of a prominent knightly family in Herefordshire during the reigns of Edward I, Edward II and Edward III. An important retainer of the de Bohun Earls of Hereford, he gave rise to the Devereux Earls of Essex and Viscounts of Hereford.

== Ancestry and childhood ==
Stephen Devereux was born probably in the range 1289-1295, (Note: In the legal battle over Lyonshall between 1306 and 1310, Stephen Devereux was consistently described as being of 'non-age' during these events. This indicates he had not reached the legal age of 21 years by 1310.) the son of Walter Devereux of Bodenham and his wife, Margery de Braose. His grandmother, Alice Grandison, died shortly after the birth of his father, and his grandfather married a second time to Lucy Burnell. She gave birth to his half-uncle, John Devereux of Frome, whose descendants would later contend with Stephen over control of their patrimony. (Note: The early death of Stephen Devereux's grandmother, Alice de Grandison, and the granting for life of some of the attainted Devereux lands directly to his step-great-grandmother, Maud de Giffard, facilitated the passage of lands to John Devereux including Frome, Holme Lacy, Stoke Lacy, and Lower Hayton.) His grandfather spent his life struggling to regain control of the lands forfeited by Stephen's great-grandfather who had died in rebellion at the Battle of Evesham in 1265, and were subject to the Dictum of Kenilworth. Stephen Devereux's coat of arms was the same as his father: argent a fess gules, in chief three torteaux.

== Marriage ==
He married Cicely. (Note: Cicely's last name may be de la Wood. On 27 Oct 1328 William de la Wood the Elder was granted Willersley manor; and 3 messuages, 2 carucates, 45 acres of land, and 2 shillings rent in Weobley, Norton Canon, Willersley, and Bredwardine from Parson John Gomond with remainder to William de la Wood the Younger, and in absence of heirs successively to William Devereux, Nicholas Devereux, and Richard Clehonger. William Devereux was the patron of the rectory in Willersley parish, Herefordshire in 1349.) (Note: Stephen Devereux possibly had a second wife, Agnes, who was his widow. There is a reference in the will of Elizabeth de Bohun, Countess of Northampton, dated 31 May 1356 to an Agnes Devereux.) They had children:

- Walter Devereux of Bodenham.

About 1331 Sir Walter Devereux witnessed the grant for life by Walter fitzRichard of Bulley (Gloucestershire) to Hugh and Mabel de Bradfield of 20 acres of land and a fourth part of the meadow held in Bulley of the fee of the Hospital for 20s and rent of 2s yearly. This probably means he had to then at least be an adult (aged 21). A copy of this grant is held in the Devereux Papers at Longleat House. On 1 February 1338 he set out on pilgrimage on the Camino de Santiago. With the outbreak of the war with France, Devereux was back in support of the Earl of Northampton, and probably participated in the battles of Sluys and of Morlaix, and the campaigns in Brittany. Walter Devereux was in the retinue of the king when Edward III invaded France in 1346. He was present at the Battle of Crécy on 26 August 1346. As a retainer of William de Bohun, he probably fought in the second division. On 10 November 1351, Devereux received a commission with Thomas de Cary, sheriff of Somerset and Dorset, to arrest Nicholas de Poyntz and his servants. Walter Devereux seized Hoke and Stapulford in Dorset on 6 January 1355 following the death of Joan, widow of Robert Syfrewast of Hoke, claiming to be the chief lord of these lands. Devereux held the estates until 1 August 1355 when they were taken into the king's hands. He died without issue about 1359.

- William Devereux of Bodenham

== Career ==
Upon the death of his father, Walter Devereux, in 1305 Stephen Devereux was the heir to the ancestral Devereux lands in Bodenham and Burghope. He could not however, be the lord of the places until he was of age which happened several years afterwards. Large parts of Bodenham had been in the possession of his family since the Domesday Survey when they were held by a William Devereux. Burghope had been held by the Longchamp family, and probably came into the possession of the Devereux through the marriage of Walter Devereux with Cecilia de Longchamp as did other lands at Frome Herbert (Halmond) in 1205.

He was a retainer of the de Bohun's, and his family had been drawn into the private war between Humphrey de Bohun, 3rd Earl of Hereford, and Gilbert de Clare, Earl of Gloucester, in 1291. It is probable that de Bohun's defiant actions in support of baronial rights may have contributed to an unfavourable disposition by King Edward I towards the Devereux family.

Stephen's grandfather, Baron Devereux of Lyonshall, to meet debts incurred in the service of the King in Gascony, was forced to grant in 1299 his castle of Lyonshall to Roger, 1st Baron de la Warr. Within the year de la Warr transferred it to Walter de Langton, Bishop of Coventry, and in 1300 the Baron is shown granting Lyonshall to the Bishop for life. Later that same year Langton in turn placed Lyonshall in the possession of William Tuchet who began styling himself as Lord of Lyonshall.

Following the death of Edward I in July 1307, Walter de Langton was arrested, and his lands seized. The bishop was brought to trial for corruption, and during the proceedings the court dealt with the ownership of Lyonshall. The sheriff of Herefordshire was ordered to determine if Sir William Devereux, Lord of Lyonshall, or his heirs held the castle. The sheriff reported that William Devereux held nothing, but William Tuchet and Richard de Abyndon (Note: Appointed baron of the Exchequer in 1299, he worked closely with Walter de Langton and would receive a prebend in Lichfield Cathedral in 1304.) possessed certain lands and tenements previously held by Devereux. On 30 November 1307 William Tuchet testified that William Devereux currently held the manor of Tasley, Shropshire, and the Bishop of Chester (Note: The bishopric of Chester at this time was held by Walter de Langton as part of the bishopric of Coventry) held some of the other tenements in the county of Salop, which together Devereux held on the day of the debt's recognition in 1300.

The court proceedings continued from term to term, and William Devereux failed to appear to protect his family's interests (possibly due to some incapacity either from old age or injuries suffered from many years of military service). The reversion of Lyonshall after the death of William Devereux and his second wife, Lucy Burnell, had been granted to Walter Devereux, William's son by his first marriage and Stephen's father. As his father had died in 1305, Stephen Devereux seized this opportunity in 1308 to drive Tuchet from Lyonshall by force. In June 1308 Tuchet requested 30 pounds compensation for damages and losses caused by the attacks executed by Stephen Devereux and 4 others.

On 14 October 1309 the part of Langton's trial concerning Lyonshall was dismissed because no recognizance was found. As Stephen was under-age, his guardian (and uncle, John Devereux of Frome) brought suit on his behalf in 1310 against William Tuchet demanding the restoration of Lyonshall as the transfer violated Stephen's rights of reversion as heir of Walter Devereux, son of William Devereux and his first wife, Alice Grandison. Stephen was granted the right to be heard despite being under-age, as the potential damage was occurring while he was under-age. Stephen's suit was denied based on the terms of the recovery of Lyonshall under the dictum of Kenilworth. It had been granted to William Devereux and his second wife, Lucy Burnell, for the term of their two lives, and after their decease reverted to Stephen's father, Walter Devereux, and his heirs. As the Baron and his second wife were both alive and tenants-for-life, any action on behalf of Stephen was not supported by common law or Statute (which only gave right of recovery for alienation by a tenant-in-dower). Stephen Devereux yielded control of Lyonshall in 1310.

Walter de Langton would be restored to his office of Treasurer in January 1312, but by this time Bartholomew de Badlesmere, 1st Baron Badlesmere, had gained the rights to Lyonshall and enfeoffed William Tuchet again. By the time of Langton's death in 1321 control of Lyonshall castle had passed from the Devereux family.

Stephen Devereux's alignment with Humphrey de Bohun during the killing of Edward II's first favourite, Piers Gaveston, probably contributed to the failure of the family to retain their Barony upon the death of Stephen's grandfather in 1314. As the Baron's widow, Lucy, was still alive, he still had no legal claim to a large portion of his inheritance. In Easter 1315, her right to dower was upheld despite a claim that she was living in adultery at the time of her husband's death. The court found in her favor as she had not abandoned her husband's home by continuing to live in a Devereux manor.

As a member of the Earl of Hereford's retinue, Stephen Devereux was probably present at the Battle of Bannockburn in June 1314. In the subsidy rolls of 1316 Stephen was listed as holding lands in Bodenham and Burghope in Herefordshire. As later the Despenser War played out, Devereux was also probably with Humphrey de Bohun when he was killed at the Battle of Boroughbridge on 16 March 1322. Stephen Devereux served on the jury on 24 January 1324 attesting to Adam Orleton, Bishop of Hereford's complicity in the rebellion of Roger de Mortimer in 1321, and his brother, John Devereux of Manne, was among the men conducting the inquiry into Orleton's actions. Although Stephen was in the party opposing the king's favorites, the Devereux of Bodenham bore a grudge against Mortimer that had its roots in his being granted their lands under the Dictum of Kenilworth described above. This placed Stephen Devereux further at odds with the Devereux of Frome. His half-uncle, John Devereux, had become associated with Henry Mortimer of Chelmarsh prior to his death in 1310, and John's widow, Constance Burnell, had married Henry Mortimer as her second husband. Stephen Devereux's cousin, William Devereux of Frome, would be part of the Mortimer retinue throughout his life.

The Despencer War also caught up with William Tuchet who was executed along with Bartholomew de Badlesmere in 1322 following the Battle of Boroughbridge. His death brought Lyonshall Castle back into the King's hands as Baron Devereux's widow was still alive, and Badlesmere's heir was a minor. Stephen's cousin, William Devereux of Frome, made his first claim to usurp control of Lyonshall at this time, but Edward II refused to restore it to either line of the Devereux family and granted it to John de Felton in 1326. The invasion of England by Roger Mortimer and Queen Isabella shifted power to the Mortimers and the King was forced to abdicate in favor of his son Edward III. William Devereux of Frome, took this opportunity to forcibly disseise Felton of the castle. He held it until Edward III reached majority in 1331, and had Mortimer executed. Without Mortimer support, William Devereux's petition was denied and Lyonshall relinquished back to the crown. Edward III bestowed it back on the Badlesmere heir, Giles de Badlesmere. Upon Giles' death, William Devereux's son, another William Devereux of Frome would make one last attempt to gain the castle by filing suit in 1340 against John de Vere, 7th Earl of Oxford who had gained possession by right of his wife, but was again denied. (Note: In 1335, William de Bohun, Earl of Northampton, married Elizabeth de Badlesmere, widow of Edmund Mortimer, to promote an end to the hostilities between the two families. This probably also contributed to the failure of the de Bohun's to support any effort on Stephen Devereux to regain Lyonshall.)

Stephen Devereux, like his cousin, lacked enough royal favor to regain Lyonshall during his lifetime, but remained a key retainer of the de Bohun family. William and Edward de Bohun participated in the coup against Roger Mortimer that freed Edward III from his control. The king later rewarded the family by creating William de Bohun Earl of Northampton. The influence of the de Bohuns provided a path for the Devereux family to regain royal favor, and facilitated the placement of Devereux's nephew, John, in the company of Edward, the Black Prince.

Stephen witnessed land transactions in Whitchurch Maund in 1335 along with his brother, John Devereux of Manne. His brother and son, Walter Devereux, both probably participated in Edward III's wars in Scotland and France.

By 1340, Stephen had gained enough royal trust to be assigned on 20 April the task of collecting the ninth of lambs, fleeces, and sheaves in Herefordshire granted by Parliament to pay for the King's military actions on the continent. On 15 March 1341 Devereux was appointed to collect and sell the ninth for the second year of the grant. (Note: The king complained that he did not receive these funds in time the previous year, and was compelled to raise the siege of Tournay and make a truce with France.)

In 1346 Stephen Devereux was listed as holding Bodenham in Herefordshire for 1/2 knight's fee valued at 20s annually. (Note: Bodenham was indicated as being previously held by his father, Walter Devereux.) On 20 July 1348, Stephen was again appointed to collect from Herefordshire the first of three years of the tenth and fifteenth granted by Parliament to the king. The appointment was renewed on 16 July 1349, but Stephen Devereux must have become ill or infirmed shortly after as another was appointed in his place on 26 September 1349. When he died in 1350, he had laid the groundwork for the advancement of his descendants. Also his nephew, John Devereux of Whitchurch Maund, would rise through his close relationship with the Black Prince to finally regain the barony and Lyonshall Castle.
