= William Devereux (disambiguation) =

William Devereux or William d'Évreux may refer to:

- William Devereux (died after 1110), Anglo-Norman nobleman
- William Devereux (1219–1265), Marcher Lord
- William Devereux (died 1376/7), knight in Herefordshire
- William Devereux, Baron Devereux of Lyonshall (died 1314), Marcher Lord
- William Devereux of Frome (died 1336), knight
- William Devereux of Frome (1314–1384), member of Parliament
- William, Count of Évreux (died 1118), Norman aristocrat
- William d'Evreux, son of Archbishop Robert II of Rouen, father of Judith, Countess of Sicily, and uncle of the above
