= Walter Devereux of Bodenham and Bromwich =

Anglo-Norman knight and sheriff

- Other names: Walter de Everiis; Walter de Bodenham
- Born: circa 1221
- Died: 1292
- Spouse: Sarah de Offini
- Issue: Walter Devereux
- Father: John Devereux of Bodenham and Decies

Walter Devereux of Bodenham and Bromwich was an Anglo-Norman knight and sheriff of Herefordshire living during the reigns of Henry III of England and Edward I of England. The Devereux were a prominent family along the Welsh Marches during the thirteenth century, and integral to the control of this region during the Second Barons' War.

== Ancestry and childhood ==
Walter Devereux was born about 1221, the son of Sir John Devereux of Bodenham (Herefordshire) and Decies (Ireland). His father was a key member of the retinue of Richard Marshal, 3rd Earl of Pembroke, and as a result of Henry III's conflict with the earl, John Devereux lost his estates in Ireland. Walter Devereux was placed as a hostage with Hugh de Kilpeck in 1233 and 1234 to ensure his father's good behavior, and eventually inherited his father's lands in Bodenham.

== Career ==
Walter Devereux was in the king's service, helping protect the Welsh Marches during the 1240s. On 29 September 1245 following the death of his father, he was granted respite from the demand of payment by Hamo of Hereford (a Jewish money lender) of a debt of 12½ marks owed by his father, John Devereux.

In the 1240s there is a reference to a release by Robert de Wilmeston, son of Roger de Chandos (Lord of Snodhill), to the monks of Dore of all the land upon the Godway (Blakemere) in Hereford, which the said monks held from Sir John Devereux, from the upper part of Wadel (a tributary of the river Lugg) to the boundaries of Malfeld (in Peterchurch) and Isaacsfeld (abutting on a meadow called 'Wetemore). The land extended to the combe of Wilmeston, and part abutted on Titekmille and extended to Hyldithelee. This document was witnessed by his son, Sir Walter Devereux among others. Walter Devereux gave a confirmation of these gifts of land in his fee to the abbey on 6 December 1251.

In 1253 Walter Devereux was granted protection while overseas with the king in Gascony. Henry III arrived in Gascony in August 1253, and would remain there until a treaty was signed with Alphonso X in April 1254. Walter may have been injured during this expedition as on 26 July 1256 Walter Devereux is granted an exemption for life from being put on assizes, juries or recognitions, and from being made sheriff etc. against his will.

Following his marriage to Sarah de Offini about 1252, Walter held additional lands in Bromwich, county Staffordshire. (Note: He held with 2 coparceners. Sarah's sister, Margaret de Offini, had not married Richard de Marnham by this time and Walter Devereux's coparceners were his wife, Sarah, and Margaret.) In 1258 his sister-in-law, Margaret de Offini of Bromwich accused a servant of Walter Devereux of holding her against her will.

On 14 April 1256 his first cousin, William Devereux, confirmed the charters and grants of William's father, Stephen Devereux, to the church of Saint Leonard of Wormsley (de Pyon). This was witnessed by Walter Devereux whose father, John Devereux, had witnessed the original grant.

During Easter of 1261 Walter Devereux, now stylized as Lord of Bodenham, borrowed 22.5 marks from Ysah son of Dyay, the Jew. Around this time Lord Walter Devereux, identified as a knight, witnessed the grant of Thinghill (Herefordshire) by Roger Burghull to his son.

As the Second Barons' War broke out, Walter Devereux probably remained loyal to Henry III like his cousin, William Devereux, and fought for the king at the Battle of Lewes on 14 May 1264. Following the victory of Simon de Montfort, Walter again probably followed his cousin's lead and went over to the Baronial side. On 28 October 1264 Walter Devereux was appointed sheriff of Herefordshire. On 20 May 1265 the issues of Herefordshire were committed to the care of ‘Walter de Everiis’ and this included the support of the constable of Hereford Castle. On 20 June 1265 Walter Devereux, sheriff of Herefordshire, was granted control of Lugwardine, Mawardine and, Dylun. (Note: These were estates of Simon de Montfort in Herefordshire.) Devereux fought against the king at the Battle of Evesham on 1 August 1265. He appears to have died in the battle and the lands of the rebel, Walter Devereux, were granted to Matilda, wife of Roger Mortimer.

In 1272 the Prioress of Lingebrook was summoned to answer the coheirs of Walter Muscegros as to why she blocked their redemption of tenements in Bodenham under the Dictum of Kenilworth. They claimed the tenements had been given by King Henry III to John L’Estrange under the terms of Kenilworth. The Prioress claimed that Muscegros had enfeoffed John L’Estrange, who enfeoffed Walter Devereux, who enfeoffed Nicholas Duredent, who enfeoffed Master John de Croft, and Croft granted the same to the Prioress in frankalmoin. The result of the suit is not known. Lingebrook Priory was near Devereux's lands lying a quarter mile from the left bank of the river Lugg, and within 2 miles of Wigmore.

== Marriage ==
Walter Devereux married Sarah, daughter of Richard de Offini of (West) Bromwich, Staffordshire. (Note: The Offini family is first reported to have Guy de Offini holding (West) Bromwich about 1140 (died after 1155). He passed it to his son, William (holding in 1166, and died about 1213), and William in turn passed it to his son, Richard (succeeded to Bromwich in 1212) who died in 1222. Richard's brother, William inherited it, but died in 1224 and his son, Richard inherited the fees for (West) Bromwich as a minor. Richard was of age by 1242, but died by 1255. A fine from 1248 involving land in Bromwich is endorsed by ‘Sarra and Hellis (Margaret), daughters of Richard de Bromwyz.’ Upon Richard's death (West) Bromwich was inherited by his two daughters: Sarah (wife of Walter Devereux) and Margaret (wife of Richard de Marnham).) about 1252. They are known to have had a son:

- Walter Devereux the Younger in 1257.

== Death ==
Walter Devereux of Bodenham and Bromwich probably died in rebellion at the Battle of Evesham on 4 August 1265. His son, Walter Devereux the Younger made a claim against Roger Mortimer and Maud his wife for 2 carucates of land in the village of Bodenham, 1 carucate in the village of Maund, and 1 carucate in the village of Wellbrook that they withheld because of war and because he was underage. He demonstrated that he was of full age, and was granted his lands according to the terms of the Dictum of Kenilworth.

== Walter Devereux the younger ==
In 1275 there is a description in the fine rolls of an accusation by Richard de London against a group of men for beating, ill-treating, and imprisoning him at Thirlegh (Tirley). He claimed 20 pounds as damages. He identified his assailants as Philip de Arcy, John Devereus, (Note: Probably Walter Devereux's distant cousin, John Devereux, Lord of Munsley) Vivian de Standon, Hugh de Dutton, Walter Devereus, John Pauncefot, Robert de Somerville, William Fraunceys, William de Mortymer, Nicholas de Huggeford, and thirty-seven others. None of the defendants appeared in court, and the Sheriff was ordered to detain them and bring them to the next court session. William de Upton sued Walter Devereux, Richard de Marham, and his wife Margaret in 1276. This suit demonstrated that Walter's mother, Sarah de Offini, had died by this time. Upton claimed that a holder of a tenement should not be compelled to view a frankpledge outside of the area they resided. Around this time the Marnhams granted to Robert de Grete a portion of ‘hey’ in Bromwich that had previously been held by William de Wavere. This grant lay between the part of the ‘hey’ of Walter Devereux adjoining the highway from Bromwich church to Grete mill. The inquisition post-mortem of Roger de Somery in 1290 listed Walter Devereux and Richard de Marnham as holding fees from the Barony of Dudley for West Bromwich. Walter also held a manor at Uffington in Berkshire. Walter Devereux the Younger came before the Justices on 6 January 1293 to demonstrate his right (Quo Warranto) to hold Bromwich. The first matter had a jury upholding the younger Walter Devereux's rights to common pasture in West Bromwich by inheritance from his mother, Sarah (de Offini) Devereux, who had inherited this from her grandfather, Richard de Offini. Walter Devereux the Younger's aunt, Margaret (de Offini) de Marnham's rights were also upheld on the same grounds. The court additionally upheld their shared rights to have free warren, fair market, and gallows for the manor of Bromwich. The right of way was deferred to be heard before the king. In 1301, Walter Devereux filed suit against Osbert and Margaret de Tamworth of West Bromwich, Richard le Parker, Richard de Wygemere, Ralph Swyft, Henry Dun, and William del Hull for cutting down his trees at West Bromwich. The next year Walter having not prosecuted his writ of novel disseisin against de Tamworth and his wife respecting his tenements in West Bromwich, was placed at the mercy of the court, but his fine was remitted at the instance of Edmund de Mortimer. (Note: This Walter Devereux may have been the cousin, Walter Devereux of Bodenham who eventually inherited his lands) In September 1304, Walter Devereux withdrew a suit against Agnes, widow of Roger de Somery, regarding his tenements in West Bromwich. (Note: This Walter Devereux may have been the cousin, Walter Devereux of Bodenham, who eventually inherited his lands) Walter Devereux the Younger seems to have died about 1304 without an heir, and his estates passed to his cousin of the same name, Walter Devereux of Bodenham. (Note: Walter Devereux of Bodenham was the son of William Devereux, Baron Devereux of Lyonshall)

== General references ==
- A.P. Baggs, G.C. Baugh and D.A. Johnston. A History of the County of Stafford: Volume 17, Offlow Hundred (Part): West Bromwich, Manors. (London, 1976), pp. 14–20. accessed 26 December 2015.
