= William Devereux (died 1376/7) =

Historical English knight

William Devereux of Bodenham
- Born: c 1315
- Died: 27 January 1377 (aged 61/62)
- Buried: Hereford Cathedral
- Spouse: Anne Barre
- Issue: Walter Devereux of Bodenham
- Father: Stephen Devereux of Bodenham and Burghope
- Mother: Cicely

Sir William Devereux of Bodenham (Note: He should not be confused with his contemporary cousin, William Devereux of Frome.) was a prominent knight in Herefordshire during the reign of Edward III, and an important member of the retinue of the Earls of Hereford. He is the ancestor of the Devereux Earls of Essex and Viscounts of Hereford.

== Childhood and Ancestry ==
William Devereux was born about 1315, the second son of Stephen Devereux of Bodenham and Burghope and a woman named Cicely. (Note: Cicely’s last name may be de la Wood. On 27 Oct 1328 William de la Wood the Elder was granted Willersley manor; and 3 messuages, 2 carucates, 45 acres of land, and 2 shillings rent in Weobley, Norton Canon, Willersley, and Bredwardine from Parson John Gomond with remainder to William de la Wood the Younger, and in absence of heirs successively to William Devereux, Nicholas Devereux, and Richard Clehonger. William Devereux was the patron of the rectory in Willersley parish, Herefordshire in 1349.)

Rising debt related to the terms of the Dictum of Kenilworth led his great-grandfather, Baron William Devereux, to financial arrangements permitting the alienation of Lyonshall Castle, the caput of the Barony. William Devereux's father, Stephen Devereux of Bodenham and Burghope seized the castle by force in 1308 and brought suit for its return, but his plea was denied, as the Baron was still alive. Stephen would never regain Lyonshall in his lifetime, nor would he inherit the title upon his grandfather's death. William and his uncle, John Devereux of Manne remained close throughout their lives, united in a desire to regain their lost patrimony.

His arms were: Argent a fesse gules, in chief three torteaux.

== Marriage ==
William Devereux married Anne Barre, daughter of Sir John Barre, about 1336. They had a son:

- Sir Walter Devereux of Bodenham his heir (b. ~1339).

== Career ==
William Devereux and his elder brother, Walter Devereux, continued their family's support of the de Bohun family, and both participated in Edward III's 1336 invasion of Scotland. William Devereux was granted Letters of Protection for service in Scotland on 3 July 1335, and for this service was knighted about 1337.

During the 1340s William's brother, Walter Devereux, represented the family in Edward III's campaigns in France. The financial pressures of the king's expensive foreign alliances during this time led to disorder in England. On 10 Nov 1344 Sir William Devereux was implicated in a riot in Hereford. Following a disturbance, some individuals that were involved were committed to the king's prison in Hereford. Sir John le Poyns and Sir Thomas de Chandos entered the prison by force with a multitude of people, and freed the prisoners. They beat the keeper of the prison, who was the king's sergeant and bailiff of the city, and drove him out. Afterwards part of the force went to one of the gates of the city, drove away the porter and kept the gate open. They assaulted many men of the city there and killed some. They then assembled in the king's wood of ‘La Haye’ by the city with Sir Richard de Baskerville, Sir John Talbot, Sir John de Roos, Sir John de Frene the younger, Sir John de Wyne, Sir Baldwin de Freville, Sir William Devereux, and their esquires forming an unlawful confederacy surrounding the city. They blocked the ways leading to Hereford and prevented the inhabitants of those parts from bringing goods. To prevent the sustenance of the king's lieges there; they seized wines and victuals brought to the city and then turned back the carts and carriages, broke mills so their corn could not be ground, and daily took the beasts so that the lands remained uncultivated.

Between August and December 1346 William Devereux was implicated in another complaint prompting a commission of Oyer and terminer. William and Richard Spink, citizens of Norwich, stated that Thomas de Lisle (Bishop of Ely), John de Lisle (his brother), William Devereux, and others had ambushed them at Marcheford by Welle, county Norfolk, and drove away 4 oxen, 9 cows, and 100 sheep worth 40 marks, and carried away goods worth 20 pounds. The individuals were plotting against them day and night so that through fear they had to abandon their dwellings there and did not dare to return. Nearby they laid siege to them at Dickleburgh and Norwich. The Spinks were threatened with incarceration of their body, and mutilation of their members such that they dared not go out and pursue their trade. Their goods were carried away, and their men and servants assaulted whereby their service was lost for a great time.

William Devereux was the patron of the rectory in Willersley (Note: See note b) parish, Herefordshire in 1349. On 4 April 1350 William Devereux of Bodenham was identified as a merchant of Herefordshire in a writ of debt for 76L to William de Cowley.

In 1350 William's father, Stephen Devereux, died. William's elder brother, Walter Devereux, followed his father in death about 1360 without issue. (Note: A portion of Bishopstone, Herefordshire was held by a distant cousin, Roger Devereux, and it is possible that this also passed back into the hands of William Devereux about this time.) Upon receiving his inheritance, William Devereaux made concessions and granted lands about 1354 to his cousin, Baron John Devereux and the heirs of his body for a term of 70 years. These included a quarter of the manor and the advowson of Bishoptown (Bishopstone); Whitchurch Maund manor; and the lands in Whitchurch Maund and Marsh Maund held from the Bishop of Hereford for knight service. (Note: 1409, May 11, Inquiry post-mortem of Baroness Joan (Devereux) fitzWalter. 3) of the Bishop of Hereford by knight service: a quarter of the manor and the advowson of Bishoptown; and Whitechurch Maund manor, and the lands in Whitechurch Maund and Marsh Maund granted to her and her descendents by “concession of William Devereux, deceased” for a term of 70 years.)

Devereux acknowledged that he owed Sir Ralph Spigurnell 1000 marks in 1358. On 3 February 1359 Devereux witnessed William le Bray's grant to Walter de Houton of Bodenham a parcel of land in More. He witnessed another grant for life on 31 March 1360 by Walter Coleman of La More to Walter de Houton and his wife, Emota, of 1 acre of pasture in Bodenham, called ‘Goreacre.’ (Note: Land term referring to the small irregular triangle in the corners of furlongs) Also on 24 December 1360 he witnessed William Walsh's grant to Walter Coleman of 1 acre in Bodenham. (Note: The de Houtons were mentioned in previous land grants witnessed by William’s uncle, John Devereux of Manne, involving property adjacent to William's deceased grandfather, Walter Devereux of Bodenham.)

William Devereux was sued by Walter de Ribbesford of Bewdley in Worcestershire for carrying off his wife, Constance, and chattel in 1360. De Ribbesford succeeded in regaining his wife who was identified in later records of this county. On 4 May 1371, Devereux and Richard de Norton were granted the marriage of Walter, son and heir of Walter de Ribbesford, a minor who was ward of the king.

William Devereux was Sheriff of Herefordshire between 1362 and 1372. Along with John de Eynesford, Devereux was placed on the Commission of array for Herefordshire on 26 October 1366. On 28 March 1371 he was appointed to collect the subsidy from Hereford granted by Parliament to the king to support the wars in France. He was elected coroner for Hereford in 1371, but had to relinquish the post on 13 November 1371 following his appointment again as sheriff. The Inquisition post mortem of Humphrey de Bohun, 7th Earl of Hereford, on 25 January 1373 showed William Devereux holding 1 fee in Bodenham.

He was granted protection on 3 November 1373 for 1 year while in garrison in Calais in the company of Sir John Burley, and acknowledged a debt of 80 marks to Sir John de Burley on 31 May 1373 to be levied of his estates in the county of Hereford. He held the post of coroner at the time of his death on 27 January 1377. He was buried at Hereford Cathedral.

== General Reference ==
- Duncumb, John. Collections Towards the History and Antiquities of the County of Hereford. (Hereford: EG Wright, 1812). Volume 2, Issue 1, Page 37, Broxash Hundred
