= Walter Devereux (died 1305) =

- Died: 1305
- Spouse: Margery de Braose
- Issue: Stephen Devereux of Bodenham and Burghope; John Devereux of Manne
- Father: William Devereux, Baron Devereux of Lyonshall
- Mother: Alice de Grandison

Sir Walter Devereux of Bodenham was a member of a prominent knightly family in Herefordshire during the reigns of Edward I, and Edward II. He gave rise to the Devereux Barons of Whitchurch Maund, Earls of Essex and Viscounts of Hereford.

== Ancestry and Childhood ==
Walter Devereux was born probably sometime in the range 1256-1271, the son of Baron William Devereux of Lyonshall and his first wife, Alice Grandison. His mother died by 1271, while he was still young, and in which year his father married a second time to Lucy Burnell. She gave birth to his half-brother, John Devereux of Frome, whose descendants would later contend with his son, Stephen, over control of their patrimony. (Note: The early death of Walter Devereux's mother, Alice de Grandison, and the granting for life of some of the attainted Devereux lands directly to his step-grandmother, Maud de Giffard, facilitated the passage of lands to John Devereux including Frome, Holme Lacy, Stoke Lacy, and Lower Hayton.) His father spent his life struggling to regain control of the lands forfeited by Walter’s grandfather who had died in rebellion at the Battle of Evesham in 1265, and were subject to the Dictum of Kenilworth. Walter Devereux’s coat of arms was the same as his father: argent a fesse gules, in chief three torteaux.

== Marriage ==
Walter Devereux married Margery de Braose of Pipton and Brecon, in an unknown year. (Note: Margery was probably the daughter of John de Braose, Lord of Corsham in Wiltshire and Lord of Glasbury on Wye (of which Pipton was part).) They had at least 2 children: Stephen Devereux of Bodenham and Burghope, who was a minor in 1306-1310 at least, and John Devereux of Manne (Whitchurch Maund), who was born by 1302.

== Career ==
During his father’s lifetime, Walter Devereux was established in the ancestral Devereux manors of La Fenne (Bodenham) and Whitchurch Maund. Large parts of Bodenham had been in the possession of his family since the Domesday Survey when they were held by a William Devereux. As a retainer of Humphrey de Bohun, 3rd Earl of Hereford, he probably participated in the private feud his lord had with the earl of Gloucester.

Walter acknowledged a debt of 77s 4d to Laurence Lodelawe on 8 May 1289. Devereux was a knight prior to 1290 when he witnessed his father's grant to the Priory and Convent of St. Guthlac of Hereford. He was listed among the knights witnessing Roger Ragun’s bond to pay John Pennebruge 40s yearly for life on 12 Nov 1291. Devereux was probably knighted for participation in the campaigns against the Welsh that his father, William Devereux, was involved in.

On 26 May 1296 Letters of Protection were issued for Walter Devereux who was to be serving in Scotland with Humphrey de Bohun, 3rd Earl of Hereford. Walter Devereux was identified as holding over 20L in lands and rents in Herefordshire in 1297, and as such was summoned to perform military service beyond the seas. He was instructed to muster at London on 7 July 1297. He fought under Humphrey de Bohun at Falkirk. A Walter de Bodenham was listed among the men that Edward I led in the invasion of Scotland in 1298, and who fought at the Battle of Falkirk. He was identified among the horse belonging to the royal household, and as possessing a 'runicum' (horse of lesser grade) which was spotted iron-grey with a white right front foot and valued at 12 marks.

At the inquiry post-mortem on 7 January 1299 following the death of Humphrey de Bohun, 3rd Earl of Hereford, Walter Devereux held one knight fee of the honor of Brecknock.

On the subsidy rolls for 1303 Walter Devereux is shown holding 1/2 fee in Bodenham, county Herefordshire. He was assessed 20 shillings.

In 1304 he was listed as holding in custody some of the lands of the under-age Roger Mortimer, the future Earl of March. Roger was the son of Edmund Mortimer, 2nd Baron Mortimer, who had died on 17 July 1304, and his widow, Margaret, Baroness de Mortimer, had filed suit against Hugh de Aldytheleye and Isolda his wife over various parts of the estate. When being summoned to court on a follow up document dated 29 Sep 1305, Walter Devereux was identified as having died.

A grant in 1317 by Thomas Swonild to Thomas de Hueton and his sons, Walter and Hugh, described the croft as lying in the town of la More between the land late of Sir Walter Devereus and the Tyne brook. This was witnessed by his son, John Devereux.
