= William Devereux of Frome (1314–1384) =

William Devereux of Frome (1314-1384)
- Born: 1314
- Died: 1384 (aged 69–70)
- Spouses: (1) Isabel de la Hay (2) Elizabeth de Clodeshale
- Issue: John Devereux of the Moor; Thomas Devereux of the Hill (Wotton); William Devereux; Elizabeth Devereux
- Father: William Devereux of Frome (died 1336)
- Mother: Miss Lacy

William Devereux of Frome the younger (Note: He should not be confused with his contemporary cousin, William Devereux of Bodenham.) was a member of a prominent Herefordshire family during the reign of Edward III. He was an important retainer of the Mortimer family, sheriff of Hereford, and member of Parliament.

== Childhood and ancestry ==
William Devereux was born on 1 November 1314, the son of William Devereux of Frome (died 1336) and his wife, Miss Lacy. After his mother’s death, his father married Margaret de Mortimer of Richard’s Castle as his second wife about 1335. His father died in 1336 leaving William the manor of Lower Hayton, Salop. His stepmother married shortly after a third time to Thomas de Hulhampton quitclaiming her dower rights to William for Frome Haymondes, Holme Lacy, and Stoke Lacy for 200L

== Career ==
As a retainer of the Mortimer’s, the fall of Roger Mortimer, 1st Earl of March in 1330 placed William Devereux outside of royal favor.

In 1336 Thomas Charlton, Bishop of Hereford, complained that William Devereux and others disseised him of his freehold in Almeley and Kinnersley including manors in Almeley and Newchurch, and 3 acres of meadow. William countered that Peter Pichard had demised the contested lands to his father, that he entered into them as a minor until ejected by the Bishop, and had only re-entered them. The Bishop claimed that William’s father only held for life with reversion to Pichard on his death who then demised it to the Bishop, and William had entered armed and taken the land by force. The court found in favor of the Bishop, and William had to pay 40 pence in damages.

On 3 April 1337 Parliament included him on a list of suspected persons to be arrested and imprisoned in Hereford Castle. On 23 May 1337 the sheriff of Hereford was ordered to release him after Nicholas Devereux (Note: Probably Nicholas Devereux IV of Chanston, a distant cousin.) and others posted bond for his good behavior.

Following the death of Giles de Badlesmere’s, Lyonshall was awarded on 20 November 1338 to John de Vere, 7th Earl of Oxford by right of his wife, Maud de Badlesmere. William resurrected his father’s claims and sued John de Vere for the castle in 1340, but his claim was denied. (Note: Eventually Lyonshall would be regained by a descendant of the senior branch, Baron John Devereux, after William’s death. His son, Thomas Devereux, was granted an interest that he yielded just prior to his death in 1429)

In 1370 William Devereux contracted his son, William Devereux III, in matrimony to Elizabeth de Mortimer. With her consent, he brought her to the manse of his manor at Haymondes Frome, Herefordshire, for safe keeping until the solemnization of the marriage. His household was given responsibility for Elizabeth’s care in addition to the disposition of his goods. Ralph Zeddefen, Thomas Zeddefen, Philip de Colynton, William de Brokhamptom, Peter de Nethewode, and others came, and besieged and broke into the manse. They assaulted William’s men and servants, and carried away Elizabeth de Mortimer and his goods. They also lay in wait for Devereux to kill him. William being unable to go to the manse to dispose of his goods (and evidently unable to recover Elizabeth, demanded 40 shillings compensation on 3 July 1370. This event appears to have led to a longstanding grudge against the Zeddefen's that was unresolved at the time of William’s death years later as described below.

This insult to Devereux honor appears to have led to a rapprochement with his cousins, William Devereux of Bodenham and John Devereux of Whitchurch Maund, which contributed to a return of royal favor. William Devereux began to have a more prominent role in Hereford. He was knighted about 1370. In 1371, he was entrusted along with his cousin, William Devereux of Bodenham, with the collection of a subsidy in Herefordshire voted by Parliament to fund the king’s wars in France. William was entrusted again on 14 November 1377 with the collection of the two fifteenths and tenths voted by Parliament, and on 4 March 1380 with a fifteenth and a half and a tenth and a half. He was called to Parliament on 26 November 1383. Devereux was appointed to a Hereford commission on 20 February 1383 to inquire into the death of John Kynges of Whiteborn. He was coroner for Herefordshire at the time of his death.

In inquisitions taken after the death of Roger Mortimer, 4th Earl of March, in 1398 and Edmund Mortimer, 5th Earl of March in 1426 it is stated that William Devereux had held Frome Haymonds, Stoke Lacy, Holme Lacy, and Lower Hayton.

== Marriage ==
He first married Isabel “Matilda” de la Haye about 1338, daughter of William de la Hay. They had children:

- Thomas Devereux of the Hill (Wotton). (Note: He was bequeathed 90 pounds in the Will entered June 1385 by his distant cousin John Devereux of Whitchurch Maund) No issue, and his heirs were those of his brother, John.
- John Devereux of the Moor. He married Elizabeth de la Bere and had a daughter, Margery.
- William Devereux. No issue.
- Elizabeth Devereux. She married Edmund Cheney.

He married Elizabeth Clodeshale, daughter of Richard Clodeshale of Woodcote Manor and heiress of the Lacy’s, as his second wife about 1369.

== Death ==
William Devereux died between 21 April 1384 and 25 October 1385 (Note: He may be the Devereux represented in the effigy of a knight in chain-armour beneath a canopy ornamented with ball flowers seen in the church at Bishop’s Frome.) Provided below is a translation of his Will written 21 April 1384:

In the name of God Amen, I, Sir William Devereux, being of sound mind, make this Will on the Thursday before the Feast of St. George the Martyr, AD 1384. First of all, I bequeath my soul to God Almighty and my body to be buried in the priory of St Leonard of Wormsley. Also I do bequeath the chapel in my manor of Frome Haymond 8 pounds sterling. Also I bequeath to William, son of Stephen Devereux, (Note: This may be referring to the William Devereux of Bodenham mentioned above who died in 1376/7) thirty shillings. Also, I bequeath to my son Thomas, thirteen shillings and four pence. Also, I ordain, assign and want my Executors to work together or separately with my sons, John and William, in pursuing the recovery of two hundred silver marks from Thomas Zeddefen that Thomas owes me; of which money I want my daughter Elizabeth to have forty marks and that my sons recovering the money I spoke of have between them the residue of the same money. Also, I bequeath, want and ordain that my debts be paid of the residue; and I want that whatever remains to be given to my wife Elizabeth and my servants to have and enjoy between them. Now this Will I ordain and make Sir Walter de Cokesay; Ralph Strafford; and my son, Thomas Devereux, my executors to fulfill all the premises.

The Thomas Zeddefen mentioned in the will is the same that carried off William Devereux III’s fiancée in 1370 described above. This debt was a matter of honor passed on to his sons, and led to further action after his death.

On 4 October 1385, William Devereux’s sons set out to fulfill his Will’s instructions. John Devereux ambushed and killed Thomas Zeddefen at Zeddefen with the aid of his brother, William; and support of his stepmother, Elizabeth, and Sir Thomas de Aston.

Sir Simon de Burley was granted Castle Frome on 25 October 1385 with confirmation on 26 June 1386. The castle had been seized from the widow, Elizabeth Clodeshale, for her role in the murder.

On 20 June 1388 the escheator in Herefordshire was ordered to restore Castle Frome to Elizabeth Clodeshale and her now second husband, Sir Thomas de Aston. It was indicated that they had never been officially outlawed, and therefore there was insufficient cause for seizure. On 28 November 1388, John and William Devereux, sons of William Devereux and Isabel de Hay, were pardoned for the murder of Thomas Zeddefen.

In 1420, William’s widow, Elizabeth, would sue his, great-granddaughter through his son John, Joan Hommes, over rents from Lower Hayton, Shropshire. Elizabeth claimed them as part of her dower rights.

When Elizabeth Clodeshale died, her only heirs were her daughters by Thomas Aston, Margaret and Joan. As heiress to Castle Frome, this manor went to her eldest daughter, Margaret and her husband Richard Brace.
