= John Devereux of Bodenham and Decies =

Anglo-Norman nobleman

John Devereux
- Born: circa 1193
- Died: circa 1244
- Spouse: Alice de Hereford
- Issue: Walter Devereux; Vincent Devereux; Warin Devereux; Richard Devereux
- Father: Walter Devereux (born 1173)

John Devereux of Bodenham and Decies was an Anglo-Norman nobleman living during the reigns of King John and Henry III of England. The Devereux were a prominent knightly family along the Welsh Marches during the thirteenth century, and John Devereux was a key member of the retinue of Richard Marshal, 3rd Earl of Pembroke, and companion of Walter III de Clifford, Baron of Clifford.

== Ancestry ==
Devereux was born about 1193, the son of Walter Devereux and Cecilia de Longchamp. His father was a member of the retinue of William de Braose, 4th Lord of Bramber, and upon Walter's death about 1197 his estates were taken into de Braose's hands for the king. Walter Devereux's sons were fostered for training as knights: John Devereux with William de Braose, 4th Lord of Bramber; Stephen Devereux, with William Marshal, 1st Earl of Pembroke; and Nicholas Devereux, with Walter de Lacy, Lord of Meath. (Note: Nicholas Devereux would eventually become the Steward of Meath for Walter de Lacy, and inherit the Devereux manors of Cheynestone (Hereford) and East Leach (Gloucester).) The three brothers would sire the three Devereux families that would play an integral role in controlling the Welsh Marches during the thirteenth century.

== Career ==
Devereux joined the retinue of William de Braose about 1200 as de Braose expanded his holdings in Wales, and reclaimed his family's rights in Limerick, Ireland. On 2 April 1203, King John ordered "William de Patell" (William de Preaux) to grant the lands in France held in the King's hands (and possession of Lodovic Luvet de Fontenum) to Cecilia Devereux as guardian of the heir, John. Cecilia was identified as the daughter(-in-law) of John, Lord Devereux, who was the grandfather of the said heir, John. The grant was witnessed by William de Braose.

During the summer of 1208, King John used de Braose's escalating debt and refusal to provide a hostage to seize his lands and order the arrest of his family. In early 1209, William de Braose fled to Ireland, and King John pursued him. Braose's supporters, such as Devereux and anyone else providing him aid, including William Marshal, the earl of Pembroke, were the subjects of royal disfavor. At this time, the guardianship and training as a knight of Devereux was assumed by William Marshal, and this led to Devereux joining his brother, Stephen Devereux, in the service of the earl of Pembroke.

In the summer of 1211, a Welsh rebellion forced King John to redirect his attention to its suppression. His forces were further strained by the discovery of a plot to usurp the throne. William Marshal seized this opportunity to regain favor with a show of support, and King John restored Marshal's men and lands in Wales to counter the rebellion. In April 1213, Marshal gathered his forces, probably including both Devereux brothers, to bolster King John's forces in Kent to counter a possible French invasion. In 1214, the King's expedition to Poitou failed, and in autumn unrest swept England. William Marshal became key to the negotiations for Magna Carta, and Devereux was probably with him on 15 June 1215 when Marshal stood with King John at Runnymede.

After Pope Innocent III declared Magna Carta void, the First Barons' War broke out. In autumn, Devereux was probably with William Marshal defending the marches from Welsh incursions. Over the next year, England fell into civil war, including a French invasion and occupation of London. When King John died on 18 October 1216, Devereux was probably among Marshal's forces that secured Henry III and crowned him king. As the opposing forces maneuvered, Devereux remained with Marshal as he brought his forces to crush the baronial faction on 20 May 1217 at the Battle of Lincoln.

As reward for his faithful service, Devereux was knighted about 1218, and granted approximately 4800 acres of land. The lands were enfeoffed for two knights' fees to Marshal (Note: In 1247 a list of those holding knights fees in the barony of Galmoy (Kilkenny) still included John de Ebroicis holding 2 knights' fees, partly in Acheteyr (Achad Togarta, including Aharney). In 1317 a list of those holding fees showed this area now being held by Stephen de Oxon (or de Exeter).) through his loyal retainer, Thomas fitzAnthony. Devereux received lands in the Decies (Kilkenny, Ireland) along the river Nore encompassing Donoughmore. These included the ancient parish of Achteyr (alias Aharney), and was part of the barony of Fertagh. The grant ran from Lazhargalvan up to Mezhan, and as the water of Avenmore runs to Dufglas, and along the water of Dufglas to the nearest ford of Leichemaelergin; and as those said lands extend in Slefto to Sleftrun, that is to say Anach and Seunach, Killorzhie, Adentein, Crumachtan, Sheskin, Balinoe, Razhinakennardy, Baliachan, Affane, Ballymalaly, Balimithyan, Balykennedy, Ballydonan, Cappagh, Ross, Caselan, Kilcounan, Moy, Thelghy, Tholach, Henan, and Kulman. Further grants included Galles, Ballybrenning, Ardoe and Lislaan, Culbethach and the fourth part of Balymachethy on the east and south. These lands were held for an annual rent of 31 marks (20 pounds) to the king and were quit of the maintenance of archers therein.

Marshal died on 14 May 1219, and Devereux joined the retinue of William Marshal, Marshall's son and the new earl. Following Marshal's death, his retainer fitzAnthony's influence waned in Ireland in favor of the rising power of Hubert de Burgh and Richard de Burgh.

About 1223, Devereux witnessed the charter of his brother, Stephen Devereux, who made extensive grants to Wormsley Priory (Old Church of Saint Leonard). This deed also confirmed the grants of their father, Walter Devereux; made mention of their mother, the widow Cecilia; and was acknowledged by Gilbert de Lacy. (Note: Gilbert de Lacy was the son of Walter de Lacy, Lord of Meath)

In 1223, the earl of Pembroke crossed over to Wales to campaign against Llywelyn the Great, and Devereux probably came with him. In his absence, the Justiciar of Ireland was ordered to take fitzAnthony's lands as he was accused of detaining some of the King's escheats. During 1224, Hugh de Lacy attacked the lands held by the earl of Pembroke, and other royal demesne lands. The earl of Pembroke returned to Ireland and subdued de Lacy.

In 1225, Devereux recovered his lands by payment of 250 marks to the King. About 1225, Devereux witnessed the granting of a license by Walter Clifford for 1 mark to the monks of Salop for the grazing of their goats in the woodland of Lawton. Richard de Burgh regained the position of Justiciar in 1226, and by December Devereux's lands were again placed in his custody, probably for being among those said to be holding their castles "against the king" in August 1226. Henry III assumed full regal powers in January 1227, and by April, fitzAnthony had died. FitzAnthony's lands were taken into the King's hands in August, and these included those enfeoffed by Devereux. Henry III attained legal majority in October 1228, and the earl of Pembroke regained royal favor. In early 1229, Devereux was instructed to pay a fine of £10 to the king to have a charter granting his holdings in the Decies, which he had previously held of fitzAnthony as a tenant-in-chief of the king. On 25 March 1229, the King confirmed the: "Gift to John de Ebroicis, and his heirs, of lands in Dessyo, … all which lands the said John previously held of the gift of Thomas son of Anthony; to hold, with all appurtenances, rendering 31 marks to the king yearly; grant also to the same of free warren in the said lands, and that he and his heirs be quit of the maintenance of archers therein" The earl of Pembroke witnessed this charter. On 2 April 1229, Richard de Burgh, justiciary of Ireland, acknowledged receipt of the 10 pounds at the Dublin Exchequer.

Devereux witnessed two grants of Walter de Lacy. In 1230, Devereux witnessed the grant by Walter Clifford, son of Walter Clifford and Agnes Cundy, to Katherine, daughter of Walter de Lacy, of Burley held as part of the manor of Corfham. That same year, the earl of Pembroke accompanied King Henry III on an expedition to Brittany, and Devereux was probably in his retinue. On 6 April 1231, the earl died, and was succeeded by Richard Marshal as earl of Pembroke, who became leader of the baronial party antagonistic to Henry III's foreign friends.

In 1232, Devereux was identified in the royal book of fines as paying the 20 pounds required by law. The refusal of the Justiciars of Ireland to implement certain royal orders, though, caused Devereux to still be seeking seisin of his lands in the Decies in 1233. On 27 April 1233, the king commanded that he be granted full seisin of his lands. A portion of his lands had been retained by Richard de Burgh when Justiciar. It was this disseisin which the King referred to in his letter to Maurice fitzGelrald, Justiciar of Ireland, on 8 August 1233 instructing him to give seisin of the lands that the King had disseised Devereux, and which he had subsequently granted to him by charter. Specifically, the lands included Galles, Bellibrannyn, Arda, Lisnaan, Gurbetha, and Culma.

In mid-June 1233, Henry III took hostages from a powerful group of marchers including Walter de Lacy, Henry Audley, John Lestrange, Thomas Corbet, and Ralph Mortimer. Some suggest this was intended to restrain them from supporting Richard Marshal, but it probably was aimed at keeping them from breaking a current truce with Llywelyn. Devereux was among these marchers, and he was required to pledge his lands as security and send his heir, Walter Devereux, as hostage on 17 June 1233. In August, 1233 revolt broke out along the marches led by Richard Marshal and Walter de Clifford. The king declared Marshal a traitor when he refused to present himself at Gloucester. Devereux was among the knights who initially supported the revolt, but soon returned to Henry III. On 17 August, Devereux, William Mauduit (Lord of Hanslope), and Mathew Maung were issued charters that contained an oath of allegiance they had to make vowing forfeiture of their lands should they not serve Henry III faithfully. Furthermore, Walter, son of Devereux, was to be released from the custody of Hugh de Kilpeck where he had been held as security for Devereux and Maung, and William de Dunre was to guarantee his fidelity by providing his son to William fitzWarin as hostage.

In March 1234, the king entered a temporary truce with Richard Marshal, but conflict broke out in Ireland between Richard's brothers and the king's supporters. After allying with Llywelyn, prince of Wales, Richard crossed from Wales to Ireland, and on 16 April 1234, he died from wounds suffered at the Battle of the Curragh. Gilbert Marshal succeeded him as the earl of Pembroke.

On 10 September 1234, the king instructed Maurice fitzGerald, justiciar of Ireland, to investigate the complaint of Geoffrey de Turville, Archdeacon of Dublin, that Devereux, William of Wales, and others were placing clerks in the chapels on their lands, and that the right of appointment to these chapels belonged to the Archdeacon.

On 24 Aug 1236, Henry III pardoned Richard fitzElias £20 of the issues of the land of Devereux granted to him in compensation for the damage that he sustained in the war between the king and Richard Marshal. Maurice fitzGerald, and Geoffrey de Turville, Archdeacon of Dublin and treasurer, were instructed that Richard was to be quit from the issues due to be received at the Dublin Exchequer.

On 8 June 1237, Fulk fitzWarin attorned before the king, Devereux, and Richard de Rocheford in the matter of an assise de morte d’ancestor, which Fulk claimed against John Travers and Hugh Purcell for the land in Docoinell Glencaveran. About 1244, Devereux granted to his son and heirs his remaining five carucates (600 acres) of land in Ireland, representing the fourth part of a knight's service of the fee of Donoughmore, barony of Fertagh. The fee extends between the Cullahill Mountains to the east of side of the river Nore at Ballyragget, and borders on the southwest with Philip de Rocheford's lands in the parish of Sheffin, and on the south with the monks of Jerpoint in Grangemacomb. It also possessed the common of pasture and woods in Odogh. It was witnessed by two of his other sons: Richard Devereux, and Warin Devereux. Donoughmore lies on the east side of the river Nore at Ballyragget with the fee of Donoughmore extending along the west bank, and the five carucates taking in the ancient parish of Achteyr alias Aharney.

In the 1240s, there is a reference to a release by Robert de Wilmeston, son of Roger de Chandos (Lord of Snodhill), to the monks of Dore of all the land upon the Godway (Blakemere) in Hereford, which the said monks held from Devereux, from the upper part of Wadel (tributary of the river Lugg) to the boundaries of Malfeld (in Peterchurch) and Isaacsfeld (abutting on a meadow called "Wetemore"). The land extended to the combe of Wilmeston, and part abutted on Titekmille and extended to Hyldithelee. This document was witnessed by his son, Sir Walter Devereux among others.

Devereux witnessed the grant of Isabel de Cantilupe, widow of his brother Stephen, on 21 February 1244 to the Hospital of St. Ethelbert for the souls of herself and her two husbands "unam ladum bladi" at the Feast of St. Andrew during her life to be received at her house in Frome. This deed has a seal of white wax with the arms of Devereux, and around it "Sigillum Isabell +" and was also witnessed by Hugh de Kilpeck, and Ricard de Chandos. The arms of Devereux were described as "a fess and in chief three torteauxes."

== Marriage ==
Devereux married Lady Alice de Hereford, daughter of Thomas of Hereford and Beatrice Butler. Beatrice Butler was the daughter of Theobald Walter, 1st Baron Butler. They had children:

- Walter Devereux
- Vincent Devereux (Note: John Devereux granted five carucates of his land in Donoughmore to his son, Vincent, just prior to his death about 1244. His mother, Lady Alice de Hereford, was holding this land in dower when her son, Vincent, granted his rights to a third part of these five carucates to Roger de Pembroke in fee and socage.)
- Warin Devereux (Note: He was probably named after Fulk fitzWarin, companion and relative of his father)
- Richard Devereux (Note: Richard was probably named in honor of Richard Marshal, 3rd Earl of Pembroke. He held land in Erdicote (Gloucester), and had at least one son, Richard. On 28 June 1272, Richard, the son and heir of Richard Devereux, was pardoned by the king of the forty shillings he was fined for disseisin, and twenty shillings that his father had been fined for the same disseisin. Richard Devereux the younger was the valet of John Giffard, Baron Giffard of Brimsfield, who married Maud, daughter of Walter de Clifford.)

== Landholdings ==
Devereux inherited the manor of Bodenham Devereux, and lands in Wirkebroc (Peterchurch) and Westhide in the county of Herefordshire. John held lands in Bredwardine and Bodenham of the Honor of Brecon. He acquired during his lifetime lands in the Decies, Ireland; and Hardel (Southampton).

== Death ==
Devereux died between February 1244 and September 1245. On 29 September 1245, his son, Walter Devereux, was granted respite from a demand of payment by Hamo of Hereford (a Jewish money lender) of a debt of 12 ½ marks owed by his father, John Devereux.

== General references ==
- Asbridge, Thomas. The Greatest Knight. (New York: HarperCollins, 2014)
- Holden, Brock. Lords of the Central Marches: English Aristocracy and Frontier Society, 1087–1265. (Oxford: Oxford University Press, 2008).
- Redmond, Gabriel O'C. An Account of the Anglo-Norman Family of Devereux, of Balmagir, County Wexford. (Dublin: Office of The Irish Builder, 1891).
- Robinson, Charles J. A History of the Castles of Herefordshire and their Lords. (Great Britain; Antony Rowe, 2002). pp. 125–129
- Roche, Richard. The Norman Invasion of Ireland. (Dublin; Anvil Books, 1995)
