= England's Gate =

England's Gate may refer to:

- England's Gate, a pub in Bodenham, Herefordshire, England
- Pevensey, a village in East Sussex, England, known as England's Gate
