= John Devereux of Manne =

- Born: 1302
- Died: c. 1346
- Spouse: Margaret Barre
- Issue: John Devereux, 1st Baron Devereux
- Father: Walter Devereux of Bodenham
- Mother: Margery de Braose

John Devereux of Manne (Whitchurch Maund) was a member of a prominent knightly family in Herefordshire during the reigns of Edward II, and Edward III. He fought at the Battle of Crecy, and gave rise to the Devereux Barons of Whitchurch Maund.

== Childhood and Ancestry ==
John Devereux was born in 1302, the son of Walter Devereux of Bodenham, and Margery de Braose. His family had experienced the loss of their patrimony including Lyonshall Castle, and his father did not retain the barony granted to his grandfather, William Devereux. John's youth was spent in close alliance with his older brother, Stephen Devereux of Bodenham and Burghope, in trying to revive the family fortunes.

The ancestral arms of the Devereux family, and that of the Devereux of Bodenham were: Argent, a fesse and in chief three roundlets gules. To distinguish themselves, the Devereux family of Whitchurch Maund added a mullet or.

== Career ==
John Devereux is identified as a witness to a grant of a croft in 1317 in the town of la More (Hereford) by Thomas Swonild to Thomas de Houton (and his sons, Walter and Hugh) between the lands of his father, Sir Walter Devereux, and the Tyne brook. On 11 December 1323 a commission of oyer and terminer was called to investigate a complaint by Richard de Portes that ‘John Deueres’ was among a group of men that assaulted him at Gloucester, and broke the gates and doors of his houses at Bromesberwe (Yockeford), and Dunhampton (county Gloucester), cut down his trees and carried them and other goods away.

He came of age in 1323, and was a witness at the inquisition regarding the ongoing Mortimer insurrection on 22 January 1324. He was listed among a number of Hereford men who testified about the actions of Mortimer's men and accomplices, and the complicity of the Bishop of Hereford in their action. His brother, Stephen Devereux, was listed among the jurors.

On March 6, 1327, John Devereux was described as the king's yeoman. He was granted the bailiwick of the ‘chace of Cors’ in county Gloucester. On 26 July 1327 Hugh fitzThomas and Hugh fitzSymond recognized a debt of 30 shillings to John Devereux.

On 20 September 1332 a grant for three years was given to William de Leversete and John Deveroys of the right to take customs specified in the letters patent on goods for sale brought to the town of Ideshale and Welynton, county Salop, and passing through those towns or along the highway between them, for repairing the causeway. This was renewed on 8 December 1335 for another 3 years. Also in 1335, John Devereux along with Stephen Devereux (Note: John Devereux’s brother who died in 1350.) and Roger Devereux (Note: Possibly John Devereux’s brother or cousin.) witnessed land transactions in Whitchurch Maund, and Rosemaund in the parish of Bodenham.

John Devereux participated in Edward III's invasion of France in 1346 as part of the retinue of Laurence Hastings, 1st Earl of Pembroke, and was present at the Battle of Crécy. (Note: A 'Lord de Maune' is identified as having fought in the first or Prince's Division. His identity is not certain, and this source says probably he was Lord de Morley. It is equally possible that this is John Devereux de Manne whose name has also been spelled Maune and Maund. As John Devereux de Manne's son became a close companion of Edward the Black Prince, this provides additional support for this possibility.) He died shortly after this time.

== Marriage ==
John Devereux married Margaret Barre,. They had a son:

- John Devereux, 1st Baron Devereux
