= John Devereux, 1st Baron Devereux =

English peer

- Born: c1337
- Died: 22 February 1393
- Buried: Church of the Grey Friars
- Spouse: Margaret de Vere
- Issue: John Devereux, 2nd Baron Devereux; Joan Devereux, 3rd Baroness Devereux; Illegitimate son
- Father: John Devereux of Manne
- Mother: Margaret Barre

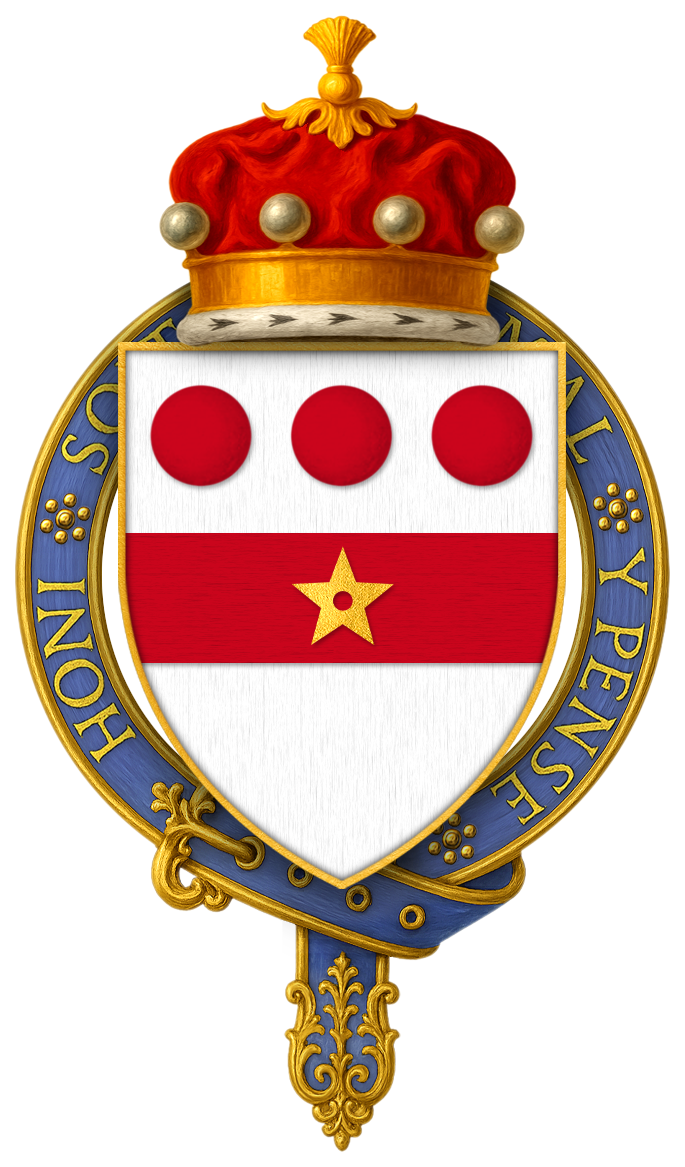
Arms of Sir John Devereux, 1st Baron Devereux, KG

John Devereux, 1st Baron Devereux, (1337 – 22 February 1393), was a close companion of Edward, the Black Prince, and an English peer during the reign of King Richard II.

== Birth and Ancestry ==
John Devereux of Whitchurch Maund was the son of John Devereux of Manne (Maune or Maund, Bodenham) and his wife Margaret Barre. His father came of age in 1323, and fought at the Battle of Crécy. His great-grandfather was William Devereux through his first wife Alice Grandison, and this William was called to Parliament as 'Lord Deverois' on 6 February 1299. (Note: The descent from William Devereux who died in 1265 at the Battle of Evesham is as follows: William Devereux (died 1314), Walter Devereux (died 1305), John Devereux of Manne {Bodenham} (came of age 1323), and Baron John Devereux (died 1397).)

Rising debt related to the terms of the Dictum of Kenilworth led Baron William Devereux to financial arrangements permitting the alienation of Lyonshall Castle, the caput of the Barony. His grandson, Stephen Devereux of Bodenham and Burghope seized the castle by force in 1305 and brought suit for its return, but his plea was denied, as his grandfather was still alive. Stephen would never regain Lyonshall in his lifetime, nor would he inherit the title upon William’s death. His younger brother, John Devereux of Manne and son, William Devereux of Bodenham, remained close throughout their lifetime united in their desire to regain their lost patrimony. John Devereux of Whitchurch Maund would carry on this alliance with his cousin, William, and William's son, Walter Devereux of Bodenham. As John Devereux of Whitchurch Maund regained royal favour, he promoted the advancement of his cousin’s grandson, Walter Devereux of Weobley, at court.

The ancestral arms of the Devereux family, and that of the Devereux of Bodenham were: Argent, a fesse and in chief three roundlets gules. To distinguish themselves, the Devereux family of Whitchurch Maund added a mullet or.

== Career ==
A renowned soldier, he began his campaigns when he joined the expedition of Bertrand du Guesclin to assist Don Enrique of Trastamara against Pedro the Cruel, King of Castile. He was recalled in 1366 by the Prince of Wales, but joined Edward, the Black Prince, when he led an expedition to Spain in 1367 to restore the now deposed King Pedro of Castile, and John Devereux distinguished himself at the victorious Battle of Nájera in northern Castile on 3 April 1367.

Prince Edward returned to Aquitaine, where he made himself unpopular with the nobility by levying taxes to pay for his Spanish expedition. John Devereux was fighting again beside him in Gascony (1368) when the province rose in revolt against the Prince, and was present in September 1370 when Edward besieged the city of Limoges and massacred 3,000 inhabitants at its fall. He was appointed Seneschal of Limousin in 1369/70, and in 1372 Seneschal of La Rochelle.

After the Black Prince returned to England in 1371, John Devereux (already a knight by this time) served under Guy de Bryan, 1st Baron Bryan, on a naval expedition in June 1371. Devereux campaigned in France during 1372, and was taken prisoner when the English were defeated by Bertrand du Guesclin at the Battle of Chizé on 21 March 1373 in Poitou. After being ransomed he was serving in the summer of 1373 in the retinue of John, Duke of Lancaster. In 1375 Devereux was back campaigning in Brittany with the Duke of Brittany (The Duke later, 1379 or 1380, granted him 100 marks a year for life). John Devereux served again under the Duke of Lancaster as Lieutenant/Sub-captain to Sir Aubrey de Vere in a naval expedition in 1378. He campaigned further in France in 1379 and 1380.

Edward, the Black Prince died on 8 June 1376, probably from an illness contracted in Spain, and was buried in great splendour in Canterbury Cathedral. Based on instructions provided by the Black Prince on his deathbed, on 20 May 1377 John Devereux was granted 200 marks a year for life for his services in Spain and Guyenne. Edward’s young son, Richard II, succeeded Edward III a year later, and John Devereux was selected for the Continual Council (Note: Westminster, 20 July 1 Richard II, membrane 16d. Appointment of William, Bishop of London; Ralph, Bishop of Salisbury; Edmund, Earl of March; Richard, Earl of Arundel; William, Lord Latymer; John, Lord Cobeham; Barons, Roger de Beauchamp and Richard de Stafford; Bannerets, John Knyvet, Ralph de Ferrers, John Devereux, and Hugh de Segrave; 'bachilers,’ as the king’s councilors. By signet bill.) on 20 July 1377 to rule during Richard’s minority (ended in 1388).

John Devereux was sheriff of Herefordshire in 1376. He was appointed Constable of Leeds Castle in Kent (1 March 1377/8), Captain of Calais (17 January 1379/80), and supervisor of the castles and fortalices in the parts of Calais and Guînes (17 April 1381). John served as a Commissioner to treat with the King of France on 20 May and 16 December 1381, 4 November 1383, 22 January 1385/6, 26 November 1388, and 8 April 1390. John Devereux was a Commissioner to treat with the Count of Flanders on 1 June and 4 November 1383, 26 November 1388, and 8 April 1390. From 12 March 1387/8 to 1392 he was Constable of Dover Castle and Lord Warden of the Cinque Ports, and from February 1387/8 until his death Steward of the King’s Household.

== Marriage ==
He married about 1377 Margaret de Vere, daughter of John de Vere, 7th Earl of Oxford, and Maud de Badlesmere, as her third husband. They had two children: John Devereux (2nd Baron Devereux) about 1378, and Joan Devereux (3rd Baroness Devereux and Baroness FitzWalter) in 1380. John Devereux had at least one illegitimate son before 1385 for whom he made in his Will an allowance of 100 marks for his marriage.

Margaret de Vere had been married previously to Henry, 3rd Baron Beaumont, who had died on 25 July 1369. She had married a second time to Sir Nicholas Louvain of Penshurst in Kent who had died in 1375. She would survive John Devereux as well. Her widow’s dower was assigned 25 Feb. 1393/4, and she died on 15 June 1398.

== Elevation to Peerage and Honours ==
John Devereux was created a knight bachelor before 1377. He was subsequently summoned to Parliament on 28 September 1384 as Lord (Baron) Devereux. Although his great-grandfather William Devereux had been summoned to parliament as "Lord Devereux" on 6 February 1299, this is considered as a new creation as none of the intervening generations between his death in 1314 and this creation in 1384 assumed the title or possessed the financial resources to support a barony.

John Devereux was further honoured on 10 September 1385 by his creation as a knight banneret and placement at the Standard, and honoured still further by his creation as a Knight of the Order of the Garter in April 1389. His arms are described as "argent, a fesse gules, in chief three torteaux" with a "mullet or." His son, John Devereux, 2nd Baron Devereux, died without heirs, and the title passed to his daughter Joan, 3rd Baroness Devereux and Baroness FitzWalter. Upon her death, the Barony was absorbed into her children's title Baron FitzWalter.

== Principal Landholdings ==
He acquired for life (with remainders to his wife and two children) licences on 24 Mar. 1381/2 and 11 April 1382 for the priories of Frampton, Panfield, and Wells from the Abbey of St. Etienne at Caen, and the priory of Newent from the Abbey of Cormeilles paying yearly 246L 13s 4d to the Exchequer. In November 1385 he purchased Kilpeck Castle for the life of Elizabeth (part of her dower lands), wife of Robert, Earl of Hereford. He acquired the manor of Penhurst in Kent by right of his wife in 1387, and was granted permission to embattle it on 21 September 1392.

In 1388 with the exile of Robert de Vere, 9th Earl of Oxford, and execution of Simon de Burley, Lyonshall Castle and manor was forfeited to the crown. On 9 December 1390 John Devereux was granted Lyonshall Castle and manor with a reference to a previous agreement between Burley and Devereux (Note: Westminster, 9 December 14 Richard II, membrane 43. Grant, in fee simple, to John Devereux, knight, of the castle and manor of Leonhale, county Hereford, which Simon de Burley, knight, now deceased, acquired about the year 5 Richard II from Robert, Earl of Oxford, in fee simple, agreeing afterwards with the said John that if he should die without issue male the premises should remain to him the said John, in fee, and subsequently granting them about the year 8 Richard II to the said John and his friends, viz. Walter Devereux, Kennard de la Bere and John Clanvowe, knights, Roger Berde and others, the same being seized into the king’s hand on account of the judgment in parliament against the said Simon. By p.s.) . This castle had been held by the Devereux family until alienated at the death of William Devereux in 1314. Shortly after regaining Lyonshall, John Devereux contracted on 18 February 1391 with a mason from Hereford to repair and improve it.

He possessed at death Lyonshall Castle, Dorstone Castle, and Whitechurch Maund (Bodenham) in Herefordshire; Donnington in Berkshire; Penshurst in Kent; and Dinton in Bucks.

== Death ==
John Devereux died suddenly on 22 Feb. 1392/3, and was buried in the Church of the Grey Friars in London. His Will (Note: 1385. John Devereux, Knight, (Testamenta Vet. Page 134).; Item, to the Chantry of Bishopeston of our Lady Cli. and a vestement of red velvet, in his remembrance. All his lands to his wife Margaret for terme of life, then to the heires of his body; for default, then to be imploied in charitie for him, his wife, and auncestors. To John his sonne, then to Joane his daughter; the after greate legasies of plate, to John Mohun le filz 2 great silver potts which were made in Flaunders, some with his armes upon them, v basons and ewers. To Jonet my daughter, to marry her, 1000 markes, with other thinges atte castelles of Wodhall & Callais. Item, that was the Lo. Beaumonds [sic] to his daughter C markes more for his household stuff, a diamond, and a mariag ringe. Margaret his wife must leave her sonne John when she dieth, the greate Egle of Almayne, and all other plate but 2 basons with Beumonds arms to Henry Beumond a silver bowl with a lion on yt. Item, on corsen and XX l to him. Item to Lauton my squire C marks; to Thomas Devereux 90 l, Item to my daughters nurse X markes to marry her; to a base sonne, to his marriage, C markes. Item to Joane a mayde of the Lady Burwashes for hir marriage 40 l, to Margaret Hogshaw for the like 40 l. Margaret his wife, Nicholas Tey, and Nicholas Poleyn, execut. He was when he lived steward. His overseers, John Bishop of Hereford, Sir Hugh Segrave, Sir Aubrey de Ver, and Sir Simon de Burley, knights. (folio 376b)) was dated June 1385 with codicil 22 Feb. 1392/3, proved 23 Feb 1392/3 at St. Paul’s Cathedral in London. He had directed that 40 marks be paid "pur mon sepulture" and was recorded as having one of the most stately funerals with provisions for tapers and torchbearers. His will directed that "6 tapers, in the form of a cross be placed on his hearse, and that 6 men, clothed in white, bear 6 torches, and that each of the men should receive eleven pence for his pains; that every poor man at his burial to have one penny to pray for his soul, and for all Christian souls; to the Grey Friars, for his burial there, XI marks. As soon as possible after his death he ordered that 1000 masses be said for his soul, and for the souls of his father and mother. To Margaret, his wife, he gave four dozen silver dishes and six chargers of silver; but after her death the same were to belong to John, her son, and in the event of his death to Joan, his (testator’s) daughter".

== Biographical References ==
- Beltz, George Frederick. Memorials of the Order of the Garter. (London: William Pickering, 1841). Page 323 to 327, Second Lord Devereux
- Burke, Sir Bernard. A Genealogical History of the Dormant, Abeyant, Forfeited, and Extinct Peerages of the British Empire. (Baltimore: Genealogical Publishing Co., 1978). page 169, Devereux-Barons Devereux
- Cokayne, G.E. Complete Baronetage. (New York; St. Martin's Press, 1984). Volume IV, page 296 to 302, Devereux or Deverose (article by G.W. Watson)
- Rawcliffe, Carole. "Devereux, John". Oxford Dictionary of National Biography (online ed.). Oxford University Press. doi:10.1093/ref:odnb/7564. (Subscription, Wikipedia Library access or UK public library membership required.)

== Specific References ==
Preceded by Sir Simon de Burley	Lord Warden of the Cinque Ports; 1387–1392/3	Succeeded by John Beaumont, 4th Baron Beaumont

Preceded by Sir Simon de Burley	Lord of Lyonshall; 1384–1392/3	Succeeded by John Devereux II, 2nd Baron Devereux
