= William Devereux, Baron Devereux of Lyonshall =

William Devereux
- Arms of William Devereux: Argent, a fess and three roundels in chief gules.
- Born: c 1244
- Died: 1314
- Spouses: (1) Alice de Grandison (2) Lucy Burnell
- Issue: Walter Devereux of Bodenham; John Devereux of Frome
- Father: William Devereux
- Mother: Daughter of Hugh Bigod, Earl of Norfolk

William Devereux, Baron Devereux of Lyonshall (c. 1244–1314) was an English noble who was an important Marcher Lord as he held Lyonshall Castle controlling a strategically vital approach to the border of Wales in the time of Edward I and Edward II. He was the first of this family officially called to Parliament, and was ancestor to John Devereux, 1st Baron Devereux of Whitchurch Maund, the Devereux Earls of Essex, and the Devereux Viscounts of Hereford. His coat of arms was the same as his father's and described as "argent, fess and three roundels in chief gules" which passed to the descendants of his first wife, the Devereux of Bodenham; or "gules od un fesse d'argent ove turteaus d'argent en le chief" which passed to the descendants of his second wife, the Devereux of Frome. (Note: The arms of the Devereux family of Bodenham with tinctures reversed.)

== Birth and early life ==
William Devereux was born about 1244, the son of the powerful marcher lord, William Devereux the Elder, and a daughter of Hugh Bigod, 3rd Earl of Norfolk, and Maud Marshal.

His mother died while he was still a young child, and his father married a second time to Maud de Giffard about 1258. (Note: Maud de Giffard had children from her first marriage: Baldwin de Freville, Alexander de Freville, Sibila de Freville, and Alexander de Freville. She also had children with William Devereux the Elder: Margaret Devereux, Archdeacon John Devereux, Master Thomas Devereux, and Sibilla Devereux.) Her brothers, Walter de Giffard and Godfrey de Giffard, both became Lord Chancellors of England, and the Giffard family would play a major role in the events of his life.

== Marriage ==
About 1264 William Devereux married Alice de Grandison, the daughter of Pierre de Granson and his wife Agnes de Neufchatel. She was the sister of Baron William de Grandison and Baron Otto de Grandison. They had a son:

- Walter Devereux of Bodenham.

William Devereux's first wife died shortly after the birth of his first son, and he married again about 1271 to Lucy Burnell. Her brother was Robert Burnell, Bishop of Bath and Wells, and eventually Lord Chancellor. They would have a son: (Note: Some sources record a possible second son, Stephen Devereux of Frome Haymond. This Stephen Devereux is probably his grandson, Stephen Devereux of Bodenham and Burghope.)

- John Devereux. (Note: John Devereux was a valet in the retinue of his father's step-brother, Alexander de Freville, during the invasion of Scotland by Edward I and Battle of Falkirk.) of Frome. (Note: John Devereux of Frome should not be confused with his distant cousin, John Devereux, Lord of Munsley.)

== Landholdings and Finances ==
William Devereux's father died while in rebellion at the Battle of Evesham on 4 August 1265, and his inheritance was forfeited to the crown. Benefitting from the support of her brothers, William's stepmother, Maud de Giffard, was able to secure her dower. On 12 October 1265, Henry III instructed the Treasurer of Hereford (Cathedral) to return to her a jeweled harness William's father had entrusted to him prior to the battle. The King further committed Frome (Halmond), Holme Lacy, Wilby, Oxenhall, and 15 pounds of revenue from Lower Hayton for her maintenance, and her brother, Walter de Giffard granted the manors to Maud for life. The Herefordshire manors of La Fenne (Bodenham) and Whitchurch Maund were probably also placed in her hands as her son, Alexander de Freville, was called to demonstrate his right to warrant for them about 1287. Her dower land would not be released until Maud's death in August 1297.

On 20 November 1265, the remainder of William's father's estates was granted to Roger Mortimer, 1st Baron Mortimer. These included Lyonshall castle, and the manors of Ballingham, Luntley, Lawton, Stoke Lacy, and Cheddar. Lawton was already in Roger's hands as part of the collateral pledged for the ransom of Adam le Despencer that had not been returned to William Devereux the Elder.

Unrest stemming from the harsh punishment of the rebel lords over the next year lead to a partial easing of the punishment with the Dictum of Kenilworth on 31 October 1266. William Devereux could recover his father's estates, and the terms were described in the Patent Rolls on 8 December 1266 (51 Henry III):

Whereas because of the trespasses which William de Evereus who stood with the King in the Battle of Lewes, was said to have done afterwards against the King and Edward his son, the King after his death gave his lands as he gave the lands of other adversaries in the time of the disturbance in the realm, and by the form of the award of Kenilworth, the King has power of making ordinances upon the state of such disinherited persons; he ordains that, as William the son and heir of the said William is prepared to stand to the said award to have his lands back, he shall pay within three years the ransom thereof to those to whom it belongs, to wit, the extent thereof for three years, so that according to the quantity of money he pays he shall have restitution of the said lands; saving to Maud late the wife of the said William for her life the assignment made to her of the said lands for the maintenance of herself and her children.

Persistent unrest in England throughout 1267 led to further easing the Dictum of Kenilworth in June. Devereux and the other rebel lords were permitted to reoccupy their lands during the period of repayment. These changes created a path for William Devereux to try to regain his father's lordship.

In 1267 an account of the estates of the bishop of Hereford indicate that the heirs of Lord William Devereux and Roger de Cradley (de Somery) held 2 fees in Holme Lacy from the Bishop of Hereford.

William Devereux struggled to obtain revenue to regain his inheritance, and was forced to make accommodations with his stepmother and mortgage assets. On 29 May 1274, a Jewish money-lender named Aaron, son of Vives, acknowledged the grant to Sir John de Pycheford (Note: John de Pycheford had married William Devereux's sister, Margery.) of all rights in three debts owed him by William Devereux; to wit: a debt of £600, a debt of £100 of the yearly value of 6 marks, and a debt of £20. John de Pycheford received the rights to raise the money of the said debts upon the manor of Lyonshall, on condition that no damage is caused to the woods and manor house, or any other waste occurs. Aaron made this grant to Pycheford with the assent of Sir Robert Burnell, the Lord Chancellor designate, and the Justices assigned to the custody of the Jews. On 2 January 1285, Robert Burnell, bishop of Bath and Wells and Chancellor of England, acknowledged the debt to Sir John de Pycheford of 100 marks to be levied in default of his lands in Shropshire. De Pycheford acknowledged receiving 10 marks from the bishop, paid for the debt owed by William Devereux.

On 3 February 1275 Devereux came into the Chancery and acknowledged the debt of 100 marks to Roger Mortimer, 1st Baron Mortimer, to be levied in default of his lands in Herefordshire, and Mortimer restored to William Devereux Lyonshall Castle and his other lands. On 19 April 1276 William Waldebef acknowledged 4 carucates of land, 20 acres of meadow, 200 acres of wood, 200 acres of pasture, 24 pounds and 11 shillings of rent in Lyonshall; and the advowson of the church of the same village to be the right of William Devereux and his heirs forever. For this Devereux gave him 1 sore sparrowhawk.

Following the pledging of Lawton and Stoke Lacy by Devereux's father, Wiliam Devereux the Elder, for the ransom of Adam le Despencer, the Mortimer family had contested their restoration even following the payment of the redemption in 1275, and demanded another 500 marks. In 1278 Walter de Heliun and Walter de Hopton (sheriff of Staffordshire) were assigned to inquire into the dispute over Stoke Lacy, and in September of this year Devereux was ordered to yield Stanley, and Mortimer to yield Stoke Lacy. This did not occur, and the ongoing dispute led William Devereux to continue to withhold the manor of Stanley from Adam le Despencer. On 18 February 1278 the inquiry post-mortem of Henry de Penebrigg (Penebrug) showed that he held the rent of Cattelee worth 4L 16s 8d by the grant of William Devereux. On 29 September 1280 William Devereux sued Elizabeth, the widow of Henry de Penbrugge (Penebrug), over a messuage, mill, and three carucates of land, etc.; and £13 8s of rent in Stoke Lacy. Devereux claimed that Elizabeth had no entry except by a demise made by his father to Roger de Mortimer in time of war for the redemption of Adam le Despencer, and which should have reverted to him according to the provisions of Dictum of Kenilworth. Elizabeth claimed she did not hold the whole of the manor, and the suit was dismissed. The first stage of the litigation against Mortimer was withdrawn after William used a defective writ in Easter term 1284. The case was revived by an amended writ and pleaded again in Michaelmas term 1285. The case was revived a second time against Roger de Mortimer, Baron of Chirk who then vouched Edmund Mortimer, 2nd Baron Mortimer in Michaelmas term 1290 and again at Hilary term 1291. In 1291 William Devereux filed a complaint with Parliament regarding the delay in the hearing of his plea by the Justices. They indicated that he had filed the plea incorrectly when it was described that Roger Mortimer, 1st Baron Mortimer, and his father were on the same side during the conflict (Second Barons' War), but the King's court indicated the parties were on opposing sides. Although, in fact they were on the same side at that point in the conflict, the justices were told to proceed as if they were on opposing sides. In 1292 William's stepmother, the widow Maud (Giffard) Devereux, brought a writ of dower against Edmund Mortimer, 2nd Baron Mortimer, and Mortimer vouched to warranty William Devereux by the deed of William's ancestor. Devereux countered that he could not be bound by that deed as it was made in a time of war, between two battles, and was voided by the Dictum of Kenilworth. The Justices argued over whether the deed was valid if the King was imprisoned at the time, but ruled this was not a factor. The Justices then questioned whether the phrase "time of war" was to be understood only of opposing parties, as William Devereux's father and Edmund Mortimer's father were both on the same side at that time. Therefore, it was not a ‘time of war’ for them. It was determined that other writs specified time only "in time of war," but did not make any mention of opposite sides or of those who are on one side. Therefore, the phrase was judged to be understood in a general sense, applying as well to one side as to both sides, and they established that the charter was made in time of war and the Dictum of Kenilworth applied. Judgment was for William Devereux and his stepmother, and he regained Stoke Lacy and yielded Stanley.

Robert Burnell, Chancellor of England, granted Lyonshall to William Devereux and his second wife, Lucy Burnell (the Chancellor's sister), to hold for their two lives. After their decease it was to remain to Walter Devereux, son of William Devereux and his first wife, Alice de Grandison. This arrangement caused discord in the Devereux family for the next 100 years as William Devereux's descendants from his second wife claimed Lyonshall based upon the rights granted to Lucy at the time of this redemption. (Note: Lyonshall would finally be regained by John Devereux, 1st Baron Devereux)

In 1277 Nicholas Duredent filed a writ of novel disseisin against William Devereux over a tenement in Luntley.

In 1278, William granted that when his stepmother, Maud de Giffard, died the reversion of the manor of Wilby, and his lands in Brisingham (Bressingham) in county Norfolk, were to go to his half-sister, also named Maud, and her husband, Richard de Boylande, in the form of a charter of free-warren. After Richard de Boylande's death, Devereux revived his claim in 1295 by filing suit for an advowson with Simon, Abbot of St. Mary's Abbey (York), against Richard de Boylande's son. Devereux lost the suit and was forced to abandon his claim. (Note: During Easter 1361 (De Banco. Easter. 35 Edward 3, membrane 201. Norfolk). Adam Blome sued Nicholas de Bourne and Cecily, his wife, over the manor of Wilby. The suit established that William Devereux had given the manor to Richard de Boylande and Matilda (Maud), his wife, to be held by them and the heirs of their bodies after the death of his stepmother, Matilda (Maud), the widow of William de Ebroicis (this William’s father) who held it in dower. The defendants pleaded that Elizabeth, the grandmother of Adam, was the daughter of Richard by a first wife, and not by Matilda.)

William Devereux also contested with his stepmother, Maud, over 8 pounds rent in Guleing (Gloucester) and Trumpeton (Trumpington, Cambridgeshire). In 1268 Robert le Paneter had restored to Maud his lands in Trumpington and quieted his claim until the lawful age of the heirs of Richard de la Bere. William Devereux granted the right to the rents of Guleing and Trumpington to Maud de Giffard, and her son, Baldwin de Freville. The remainder was to go to his other half-siblings: Alexander de Freville, Margaret (Maud) de Boylande, and Sibilla de Baskerville.

On 7 November 1278 William Devereux acknowledged a debt of 100s to William de Felton to be levied in default of payment from his lands in the counties of Derby and Stafford. On 10 May 1279 he acknowledged a debt to Grimbald Pauncefot (Keeper of the Forest of Dean) of 6L 19s 10d to be levied in default of payment from his lands in county, Hereford. On 14 November 1279 the king issued an order to the Exchequer that William Devereux was to pay 10 pounds on Easter and Michaelmas yearly until he had paid the 80L owed to recover the terms of paying his father's debt that he had not observed. On 3 November 1281 Devereux acknowledged a debt to Henry de Len, clerk, of 10 marks to be levied in default of payment of his lands in county Hereford.

In October 1279 there was an increase in Marcher lords who brought their disagreements to the local court in Wales at Montgomery. William Devereux was among them when he impleaded his uncle, Roger Bigod Earl of Norfolk and Marshal of England, for half a knight's fee in Runston and the vill of St. Peter in Netherwent. On 6 October 1280 William, the son of William Devereux, put in his place Adam de Walinton or John Russel or William Comyn against Bigod in a plea of half a knight's fee. An essoin was taken at the Church of St. Michael in Elfael, on 1 December 1280, from William de Glanvill, attorney of the Earl of Norfolk, against William Devereux in a plea of land, by Richard de Branford. On 28 January 1282 Devereux presented his claim against Roger Bigod for the half knight's fee in Runston and the vill of St. Peter in Netherwent as his right by descent as the son and heir of the William Devereux who was seised of the property in the time of King Henry III. He further argued that the Earl did not have entry, except by disseisin, which Roger Bigod did to his father. Devereux requested an inquiry, and the Earl's bailiff came and asked for his lord's court because the tenement claimed is within his lord's liberty of Netherwent. Therefore, a day was granted them on 12 April 1282. On that day the plea was put in respite until 12 November 1282. At this hearing Roger Bigod brought a protection of the King to last until close of the next Easter Term. In May 1283 the suit was postponed further to September 1283 by the King's writ because the Earl was in his service in Wales.

During 1284 the Roll of Fees demonstrated William Devereux holding Lower Hayton for ½ knight's fee from the barony of Peter de Geneville.

On 9 June 1284 the king ordered the Exchequer to examine their rolls for payments by William Devereux or his father on his father's debts of 80L. William claimed that his father had paid the greater part of the debt during his life, and he had paid 20L himself. The king pardoned 20 pounds of the debt, and granted the residue to be paid at 100s yearly.

On 24 April 1286 Sir William Devereux enrolled a demise to Sir Robert Burnell, bishop of Bath and Wells, of his lands in Ceddre (Cheddar, Somerset), to be held until the bishop collects the 40 marks he had lent to William at diverse times for his pressing needs. If the bishop was hindered from holding the land and receiving the rent, the sheriff was granted the right to levy the balance from William's lands. In May 1286 he demised to the Bishop of Bath and Wells the reversion of some tenements in Lower Hayton. Upon regaining Cheddar, Devereux granted the manor to John de Acton and his wife Sibyl (half sister of William Devereux) to be held for half a knight's fee. (Note: This may have been part of the resolution of the complaint in 1295 by William Devereux against John de Acton for taking his stock from Lyonshall while Devereux was in Gascony.)

During Easter 1287 Maud Devereux, William Devereux's stepmother, was summoned to demonstrate her right to a warrant for the manor of Oxenhall in the king's court. She demonstrated that she held it by right of dower from the heirs of William Devereux the Elder, and they had been granted perpetual free warrant in these lands. In 1292 Maud de Giffard approved Devereux's grant of the reversion rights of Oxenhall to (Baron) William de Grandison and his wife, Sibyl. This may have been part of the settling of a previous agreement from the time of his marriage to his first wife, Alice de Grandison involving the repayment of loans to John de Pycheford. (Note: William de Grandison and Sibyl, dropped their to right to oppose the claim of William Devereux’s sister Margery, John de Pycheford’s widow, to Pycheford manor in 1301.)

On 22 July 1287, William Devereux, Lord of Lyonshall, acknowledged a debt to Walter de la Barre of 14L 3s to be levied in default of payment from his lands in Gloucestershire and Herefordshire.

On 19 September 1289 William Devereux acknowledged that he owed William de Hamelton, Clerk, £10 to be levied, in default of payment, of his lands and chattels in counties Stafford and Salop. The next month he acknowledged that he owed Robert Burnell, bishop of Bath and Wells, £10, to be levied, in default of payment, of his lands and chattels in county Hereford, and William de Hamelton received the acknowledgment. On 16 January 1290, William acknowledged the £10 debt once again, but now to be levied, in default of payment, of his lands and chattels in county Somerset. On 22 March 1306 William acknowledged owing William de Hamelton, executor of the will of Robert Burnell, 1 mark to be levied in default of payment of his lands in Herefordshire and Shropshire.

Before 1290, William granted Ballingham to the Priory and Convent of St. Guthlac in Hereford for 50 marks sterling, and this charter was witnessed by his son, Walter Devereux. In 1291, the Taxation of Pope Nicholas IV occurred in England, and demonstrated the Priory's possession of this property.

In September 1290 William Devereux was back in court negotiating his redemption. Henry de Solers, Sheriff of Hereford, and 3 other justices heard the plea of William Devereux that the 100 marks required for redemption of his lands could not be achieved without forcing him to sell his land, and that this was against all precedent. The court ruled in his favor, and he was released of the 100 shillings previously discussed. This probably refers to the 100 shillings he was to pay annually established in 1284 and described above.

In 1292 John Noremon brought a writ of annual rent against William Devereux demanding 16 robes. This represented the annual rent of one robe a year that had not been paid him while the land awaited his redemption. The Court denied his claim for back rent, but upheld his rights to it going forward. The Court also heard a case involving a man named Ingram (unknown last name) who had died and his three sons (Roger, Ingram Jr., and Adam) contested who was the heir to land William Devereux had enfeoffed their father with. The death of Roger Burnell, Bishop of Bath and Wells and Lord Chancellor, on 25 October 1292 removed an important protector of William Devereux.

In 1293 William Devereux was ordered to release to Roger Bernard 1 ½ acres of land in Bodenham that was forfeited by Thomas Wydye. This land was granted to Devereux for the king's year and a day.

On 9 December 1293 William Devereux, Lord of Lyonshall acknowledged a debt of 6L 16s 8d to William Goodknave, merchant, before the Keepers of the King's Seal for Debt in Hereford. On 6 February 1294 Devereux, Stephen Caldicock, John fitzWalter, Gilbert Balwh, and Hugh Balle of Hertfordshire acknowledged the debt of 24L to Goodknave. On 8 April 1295 Devereux, John Devereux (his son), and Richard de la Bathe acknowledged a debt of 15L 10s to Walter de la Barre and his wife, Sibyl. On 29 September 1295 Devereux acknowledge a debt of 23 marks to Goodknave.

In late 1295 Devereux requested remedy from Edward I as while on King's service in Gascony and under royal protection, John de Acton (sheriff of Hereford) (Note: John de Acton had married William Devereux's half-sister, Sibyl.) broke down the gates to his park at Lyonshall, and took his stock to Hereford. Acton held the stock until he extracted a pledge for 30 marks that Devereux owed him, and for default of this money Devereux released 13 marks of rent of assize for the term of his life from the annual rent that Acton owed him. Devereux requested peace from further duress, and claimed that due to these he would be unable to go with Lord Edmund back to Gascony when called to muster on 1 November. William was granted an exemption from the Tenth to be collected in 1295, and did return to Gascony. On his return in late 1296 Devereux again pleaded for pity on his estate for the great mischief and default that he had suffered in Gascony. Under pressure from these financial strains he had made covenants with Roger de la Warr (1st Baron de la Warr) in which he enfeoffed him of the manors of Lyonshall, Stoke Lacy, and Holme Lacy for life in return for 30L per year at the two terms for his sustenance. On their return to England Devereux kept his part of the bargain, but de la Ware did not.

In 1299 Roger de la Ware granted Lyonshall Castle; and the manors of Holme Lacy and Stoke Lacy to the corrupt Walter de Langton, Bishop of Coventry and Lord High Treasurer, for life. On 16 March 1300 Devereux was forced to acknowledge a debt of 1000 pounds before the mayor and clerks of London. This debt was to be paid in goods and chattels, but the bishop caused it to be levied from lands and tenements.

William Devereux granted the bishop on 1 July 1300 the manors of Holme Lacy and Stoke Lacy for life with reversion to himself and his heirs. On 26 November 1300 William Devereux and his wife, Lucy, granted the bishop Lyonshall Castle for life at an annual rent of 20 pounds during their lifetime, and 10 pounds a year after their death. The Bishop subsequently placed Lyonshall Castle in the possession of William Tuchet who was granted on 28 January 1301 the right to hold a fair and a market at the manor, and Tuchet began to style himself Lord of Lyonshall. The subsidy rolls of 1303 show the Lord of Lyonshall holding of the honor of Weobley for 1 fee valued at 40s.

Following the death of Edward I in July 1307, Walter de Langton was arrested, and his lands seized. The bishop was brought to trial for corruption, and during the proceedings the court dealt with the ownership of Lyonshall. The sheriff of Herefordshire was ordered to determine if Sir William Devereux, Lord of Lyonshall, or his heirs held the castle. Furthermore, Devereux was to present himself on 15 November 1307, and explain what had happened to the debt of 1000 pounds recognized in 1300. The sheriff reported that William Devereux held nothing, but William Tuchet and Richard de Abyndon (Note: Appointed baron of the Exchequer in 1299, he worked closely with Walter de Langton and would receive a prebend in Lichfield Cathedral in 1304.) possessed certain lands and tenements previously held by Devereux.

On 30 November 1307 Richard de Abyndon failed to appear, but William Tuchet came before the court. Tuchet complained that Langton had given him Lyonshall in exchange for other lands, and that William Devereux had given the castle along with other lands to the bishop for the payment of a debt of 1000 pounds by Statute demanded by Walter de Langton. As Devereux had been seized of the castle at the time of acknowledging the debt, and the bishop had received the castle for this debt, Tuchet claimed he bore no responsibility to pay or provide guarantee for the 1000 pounds. Tuchet further testified that William Devereux currently held the manor of Tasley, county Salop, and the Bishop of Chester (Note: The bishopric of Chester at this time was held by Walter de Langton as part of the bishopric of Coventry) held some of the other tenements in the county of Salop, which together Devereux held on the day of recognition in 1300. The sheriff was ordered to investigate further, and have the bishop and William Devereux come before the court on 22 January 1308.

On that day William Devereux did not come. The bishop acknowledged his agreement with William Devereux, and confirmed that Devereux enfeoffed him with Lyonshall castle as security for the debt of 1000 pounds. Furthermore, he stated that with this enfeoffment, William Devereux was quit and absolved of the 1000 pounds, and it became the bishop's existing obligation.

The court proceedings continued from term to term over the next two years, and William Devereux failed to act to protect his family's interests (possibly due to some incapacity either from old age or injuries suffered from many years of military service). The reversion of Lyonshall after the death of William Devereux and his second wife, Lucy Burnell, had been granted to Walter Devereux, William's son by his first marriage. Walter Devereux had died in 1305, but his son, Stephen Devereux, seized this opportunity in 1308 to drive Tuchet from Lyonshall by force.

On 14 October 1309 the part of Langton's trial concerning Lyonshall was dismissed because no recognizance was found. Stephen Devereux subsequently brought suit in 1310 against Walter de Langton claiming that the transfer to William Tuchet violated the restriction on alienation of fee tail, which required property to be passed down within the same family. The verdict went against Stephen as the court found he possessed no claim on the property as long as William Devereux was still alive, and he yielded control of Lyonshall.

Walter de Langton would be restored to his office of Treasurer in January 1312, but by this time Bartholomew de Badlesmere, 1st Baron Badlesmere, had gained the rights to Lyonshall and enfeoffed William Tuchet again. By the time of Langton's death in 1321 control of Lyonshall castle had passed from the Devereux family.

== Career ==
Following the Battle of Evesham, Henry III initially invoked harsh terms on the rebels proclaiming their complete disinheritance forever. William Devereux was among those that this affected hardest, and he was imprisoned following the battle for some time. As described above the familial connections of his stepmother had preserved the lands of her dower, and Devereux's own connections to the Grandison family may have helped him hold on to other manors. His later family connection to Robert Burnell, Bishop of Bath and Wells and Lord Chancellor, through his second wife would be an even stronger support in the recovery of his position.

On 29 September 1267 the King came to terms with Llywelyn, and formally granted him the title of Prince of Wales. The terms of this grant, though, led to further disturbances on the Welsh marches that helped Devereux's rehabilitation. On 13 October 1270 Llywelin invaded Glamorgan, and was driven off by the Earl of Gloucester. William Devereux was a member of the retinue of Humphrey de Bohun, 3rd Earl of Hereford, and supported him in his efforts to reassert his claim to Brecon by force following the death of Henry III in 1272.

It was this ongoing warfare that led to a resumption of the Welsh Wars when Llywelin was declared a rebel on 12 November 1276. William Devereux was summoned for military service 12 December 1276 to May 1279 against the Welsh. It is probable that he was with Bohun as the earl initially suppressed the rebellion in Brecon, and then joined the main army for its advance into Wales in February 1277. On 2 July 1277 Devereux was summoned to muster at Worcester for military service against Llywelyn, Prince of Wales, and participated in the seizure of the harvest on Anglesey that summer. Following the Treaty of Aberconwy on 9 November 1277 hostilities lessened, but ongoing disturbances continued over the next few years as Edward I tried to extend English law and systems into Wales.

On 21 March 1282 rebellion broke out in northeast Wales. The king called for men from Lyonshall, and William Devereux probably fought in the retinue of the earl of Hereford as the English responded with force. On 2 August 1282 William Devereux was summoned to muster at Rhuddlan for military service against the Welsh. On 24 November 1282 the king ordered the bailiff of the earl of Hereford in the lordship of William Devereux at Lyonshall to muster before Hugh de Tuberville at Hereford on 18 December 1282 with 40 men to be led by the Constable into Wales. The order was repeated again on 6 December 1282. Llywelyn was killed in a skirmish near Builth Castle on 11 December 1282, but conflict continued into the next year. Again the king called for men from Lyonshall in Hereford on 21 March 1283 specifically instructing that the bailiffs of 'William de Everus' was to provide 40 men. Finally with the death of Dafydd, Llywelin's brother in October 1283 the Welsh were defeated and Wales annexed.

During 1284 friction began to occur between the Earl of Gloucester and the Earl of Hereford. Gloucester claimed that Hereford failed to pay the full amount of his right of marriage. This conflict escalated into a private war with William Devereux supporting Humphrey de Bohun until Edward I forced a conclusion in January 1291.

William Devereux had confirmed the grants of his father and grandfather to Wormsley Priory on 8 July 1275. In July 1285, A Register of Wormsley Priory indicated Sir William Devereux witnessed that Sir Richard de Monytone was installed as rector in Dylewe by the Bishop of Hereford, Sir Richard Swinefield. William Devereux also acknowledged in 1286 the advowson of the ‘Church of Wylehy juxta Castell-Bukenham’ to be the right of Simon, Abbot of St. Mary's Abbey (York).

The Welsh rebelled again in 1287. On 23 July 1287 Devereux was granted clause volumus until a fortnight after Michaelmas while gone on the King's service in Wales.

On 14 October 1290 William Devereux was sentenced to major excommunication by Richard Swinefield, Bishop of Hereford for detention of the tithes of the manor of Lyonshall, but William ignored it. The Bishop wrote to the king's justiciaries not to admit him to appear as plaintiff till he had made satisfaction to God and Church for his offence. This produced the effect wanted and his absolution was formally pronounced at Bosbury on 7 November 1290.

There were further mild rebellions in Wales during 1294 and 1295, but this did not require a large response by the English. Following a failed diplomatic effort with France, the English lost significant territory in their possession of Gascony. William Devereux was summoned to muster at Portsmouth on 1 September 1294 to participate in an expedition to Gascony with Edmund Crouchback, Earl of Lancaster. In January 1295, the Earl of Lancaster finally set sail with the Earl of Lincoln and reinforcements to take command of the expedition to Gascony. After the Bretons killed his messengers, the Earl plundered Brittany. Lancaster subsequently landed in Gascony, and gathered his forces at Bourg and Blaye. William Devereux was summoned to muster again on 1 November 1295 at Plymouth for military service in Gascony. On 28 March 1296 the Earl made an unsuccessful assault on Bordeaux and was forced to retire to Bayonne where he died on 6 June 1296. His forces and Devereux then returned to England.

In May 1297 William Wallace sacked Lanark Castle. William Devereux, as a holder of lands or rents in excess of 20L yearly, was summoned to muster at London 7 July 1297 for further service in parts beyond the seas. He was present at the Parliament assembled on 8 July. Devereux was at the Battle of Stirling Bridge on 11 September 1297 where the English were defeated by William Wallace. He was probably also with Edward I when William Wallace was defeated at the Battle of Falkirk on 22 July 1298. William Devereux would also serve on the campaigns of 1300 to 1301, and finally 1304. (Note: William Devereux was identified as a Centarius, an officer who had the government of a village containing 100 freemen. A number of Centenarii served under the command of a Count.)

The effects of advancing age, and years of campaigning probably contributed to failing health for William Devereux after 1300. During the last years of his life he fades from view and the Devereux banner is carried by his sons: Walter Devereux in the retinue of the Humphrey de Bohun, 4th Earl of Hereford; and John Devereux of Frome in the retinue of Roger Mortimer, 1st Earl of March. (Note: John Devereux’s widow, Constance Burnell, married as her second husband Henry de Mortimer, Lord of Chelmarsh) Both sons died during the lifetime of their father, and their grandsons would assume their positions by the time of William's death: Stephen Devereux of Bodenham and Burghope, and William Devereux of Frome.

== Elevation to Peerage ==
William Devereux was summoned on 6 February 1299 (27 Edward I) to attend the Parliament on 8 March by writ directed to ‘William de Ebroicis.’ By this he is held to have become a Baron and ‘Lord Deverois.’

== Death ==
William Devereux died in 1314. In Easter of 1315 Lucy, widow of William Devereux, brought a writ of dower against a guardian who vouched, but this was not allowed because he was not tenant of a freehold. The tenant argued that she was not entitled to dower on the grounds that Lucy had been living in adultery. It was determined, though, that Lucy was living in one of William Devereux's manor houses, and therefore she cannot be said to have left him. The court stated that it was a husband's business to keep an eye on his guests, and therefore her dower was upheld. Lucy would continue to be identified on later documents as the widow of William Devereux, former ‘Lord of Lyonshall,’ until her own death.

Of the Devereux lands it is not clear what was included in her dower. His grandsons by Alice Grandison, Stephen Devereux of Bodenham and Burghope, and John Devereux of Manne received the Herefordshire manors of La Fenne (Bodenham) and Whitchurch Maund; and 1/3 part of Frome Halmond. His grandson by Lucy Burnell, William Devereux of Frome, received Lower Hayton in Shropshire; and Lawton, and 2/3 part of Frome Halmond in Herefordshire.

During William Devereux's lifetime he had lost control of a significant portion of his patrimony. Lyonshall Castle, Holme Lacy, and Stoke Lacy were alienated by Walter de Langton. Lyonshall passed through various hands, and remained a source of contention among his heirs until restored to John Devereux, 1st Baron Devereux of Whitchurch Maund, 75 years later. Holme Lacy and Stoke Lacy were restored to William Devereux of Frome upon his marriage to Margaret de Mortimer. Guleing and Trumpeton passed to his half-brother, Alexander de Freville. Wilby passed to his half-sister, Maud Devereux, and her husband, Richard de Boylande. Cheddar passed to his half-sister, Sybil Devereux, and her husband, John de Acton. Oxenhall passed to his brother-in-law, William de Grandison, and his wife Sybil de Neufchatel. Ballingham passed to the Church.

== Biographical References ==
- Brook, W. Holden. "Lords of the Central Marches: English Aristocracy and Frontier Society, 1087–1265." (Oxford: Oxford University Press, 2008). Pages 46 to 136
- Brydges, Sir Egerton. "Collins's Peerage of England; Genealogical, Biographical, and Historical. Greatly Augmented, and Continued to the Present Time." (London: F.C. and J. Rivington, Otridge and Son; J. Nichols and Co.; T. Payne, Wilkie and Robinson; J. Walker, Clarke and Sons; W. Lowndes, R. Lea, J. Cuthell, Longman, Hurst, Rees, Orme, and Co.; White, Cochrane, and Co.; C. Law, Cadell and Davies; J. Booth, Crosby and Co.; J. Murray, J. Mawman, J. Booker, R. Scholey, J. Hatchard, R. Baldwin, Craddock and Joy; J. Fauldner, Gale, Curtis and Co.; Johnson and Co.; and G. Robinson, 1812). Volume VI, pages 1 to 22, Devereux, Viscount Hereford
- Burke, Sir Bernard. A Genealogical History of the Dormant, Abeyant, Forfeited, and Extinct Peerages of the British Empire. (Baltimore: Genealogical Publishing Co., 1978). page 169, Devereux-Barons Devereux
- Cokayne, G.E. Complete Baronetage. (New York; St. Martin's Press, 1984). Volume IV, page 296 to 302, Devereux or Deverose (article by G.W. Watson)
- Duncumb, John. "Collections Towards the History and Antiquities of the County of Hereford." (Hereford: E.G. Wright, 1812). Part I of Volume II, pages 36 to 41, 166 to 168, Broxash Hundred
- Redmond, Gabriel O'C. "An Account of the Anglo-Norman Family of Devereux, of Balmagir, County Wexford." (Dublin: Office of "The Irish Builder," 1891). Pages 1 to 5
- Robinson, Charles J. "A History of the Castles of Herefordshire and their Lords." (Woonton: Logaston Press, 2002). pages 125 to 129, Lyonshall Castle

== Notes ==
Preceded by Roger Mortimer, 1st Baron Mortimer	Lord of Lyonshall; 1274–1300	Succeeded by Roger de la Warr
