= William Devereux of Frome (died 1336) =

- Born: c 1293
- Died: 1336
- Spouses: (1) Miss Lacy (2) Margaret de Mortimer
- Issue: William Devereux of Frome
- Father: John Devereux of Frome
- Mother: Constance Burnell

William Devereux of Frome (Note: He should not be confused with his contemporary cousin, William Devereux of Bodenham.) was a member of a prominent Herefordshire family during the reign of Edward II and Edward III. He was an important retainer of Roger Mortimer, 1st Earl of March and Queen Isabella, and a knight of the Bath.

== Childhood and ancestry ==
William Devereux was born about 1293, the son of John Devereux of Frome (Note: John Devereux of Frome should not be confused with the John Devereux who held Burton, Northants. This John Devereux married Joan de Eylessford and held Burton from William de Eylesford. He married as his second wife, Eva, and was involved in litigation in 1308 over land in 'Aynaldestone' (Elnodestune, Hereford) showing him to be part of the Devereux family holding here.) and Constance Burnell. His paternal grandfather, William Devereux Baron of Lyonshall, had John Devereux of Frome by his second wife, Lucy Burnell. This junior line's coat of arms was: Gules, a fesse and in chief three roundlets Argent. This was the ancestral arms of Devereux with the tinctures reversed to distinguish it from the one used by the senior line, Devereux of Bodenham (descended from the Baron's first wife, Alice de Grandison).

William's father, John Devereux, was granted Letters of Protection for service in Scotland with Roger Mortimer on 26 May 1306. His father died in 1310, (Note: In St. Mary the Virgin Church in Bishops Frome, Herefordshire, there is an effigy dating to the late 13th century in a tomb recess on the south wall. The effigy depicts a medieval knight in surcoat and mail, with a sword and shield. A device of the Knights Templar can be visualized on the surcoat. The knight is thought to one of the Devereux family, and may represent John Devereux of Frome.) and his mother married Henry de Mortimer, Lord of Chelmarsh, as her second husband. This coupled with the death of his paternal grandfather in 1314 led to William Devereux becoming a retainer of the Mortimer family.

Rising debt related to the terms of the Dictum of Kenilworth had led the Baron Devereux to financial arrangements permitting the alienation of Lyonshall Castle, the caput of the Barony. William's cousin, Stephen Devereux of Bodenham and Burghope tried to regain Lyonshall through seizing it by force in 1305, and bringing suit for its return. Stephen's plea was denied, as he had no standing while the Baron was still alive. Both branches of the Devereux family would seek and contest the ownership of Lyonshall for the next 100 years.

== Career ==
The Devereux family's alignment against Edward II during the killing of his first favorite, Piers Gaveston, probably contributed to their failure to retain their Barony upon the death of William Devereux's grandfather in 1314. William Devereux was granted Letters of Protection for service in Scotland under John de Somery on 20 July 1319. He probably was present at the Battle of Myton on 20 September 1219.

As later the Despenser War played out, Roger Mortimer, 1st Earl of March was captured in January 1322, and imprisoned in the Tower of London. As William Devereux was his retainer, this was probably a factor in keeping him out of the Battle of Boroughbridge on 16 March 1322. Edward II's victory led to the death of Batholomew de Badlesmere and William Touchet, and brought Lyonshall Castle back into the King's hands.

William's cousin, Stephen Devereux of Bodenham and Burghope, was called in 1323 for a jury in Hereford to judge Adam Orleton, Bishop of Hereford's complicity in the rebellion of Roger de Mortimer during this time, and his son, John Devereux of Manne, was among the men testifying against Orleton. Although Stephen Devereux was also in the party opposing the king's favorites, the Devereux of Bodenham bore a grudge against Mortimer that had its roots in his being granted their lands under the Dictum of Kenilworth. This placed William Devereux further at odds with the Devereux's of Bodenham. When Roger de Mortimer escaped to France in August 1323, William Devereux remained loyal, but found himself among those suffering royal disapproval.

Edward II granted Lyonshall to John de Felton on 20 March 1326. When Roger Mortimer and Queen Isabella landed in England on 24 September 1326, William Devereux immediately rose in their support. He seized Lyonshall castle by force, and in the process usurped the rights of the Devereux's of Bodenham. Following the abdication of Edward II on 24 January 1327, John de Felton requested its return, but under Mortimer's influence he was granted another castle of equal value. Inquiries into the rightful owner of the castle determined this to be Giles de Badlesmere, a minor who was heir of the Bartholomew killed above, but Devereux retained possession.

With the ascendency of Mortimer, William Devereux was rewarded by his creation as a knight of the bath on 20 January 1327. When St. Briavel's Castle came into the queen's hands, she created William Devereux Keeper of the Castle and the Forest of Dean on 20 January 1327. Devereux was granted Letters of Protection for service in Scotland with Roger Mortimer on 4 June 1327, and probably was present at the Battle of Stanhope Park in August 1327. On 18 May 1329 William Devereux was appointed Justice of the Peace for Herefordshire.

On 19 October 1330, Roger Mortimer and Queen Isabella were seized at Nottingham Castle, and Edward III asserted his independence. With the fall of Mortimer, William Devereux also lost the favor of the crown. On 21 December 1330, he was instructed to relinquish St. Briavel's Castle to Robert de Sapi. On 18 January 1330 following a petition questioning Devereux's seizure of Lyonshall by Margaret, widow of Bartholomew de Badlesmere, Lyonshall was taken back into the king's hand. Devereux petitioned the king in January 1331 for permission to retain his control of Lyonshall manor. He claimed that his grandparents, Baron William Devereux and his wife Lucy, had granted the manor in remainder to his father, John Devereux, and the heirs of his body. He cited that Lyonshall had been alienated following a grant for term of life disinheriting him, and now resided in the king's hand following the death of William Touchet. His petition was denied, and the manor granted to Giles de Badlesmere as Bartholomew's heir. William Devereux did not accept this, and would continue to stylize himself as Lord of Lyonshall through the remainder of his life.

== Marriage ==
William Devereux married a Miss Lacy, heiress of Frome Castle, about 1312. They had a son: William Devereux his heir on 1 November 1314. His first wife died between 1314 and 1335.

He married (2nd) Margaret de Mortimer, the widow of Geoffrey de Cornewaille (died shortly before 1 June 1335). Margaret was the daughter of Hugh de Mortimer, Knt., of Richard's Castle and his wife, Maud. They had no issue, and she married (3rd) before 9 Feb. 1338/9 Thomas de Hulhampton and died shortly before 25 December 1345.

== Death ==
William Devereux died in late 1336 and on 6 March 1337 the escheator was instructed to take his lands into the king's hand. Inquisition Post Mortem testimony separated out the estates that were held by Margaret de Mortimer as dower from her previous marriage to Geoffrey de Cornewaille. Devereux also held for life a lease of the mill of Frome from the Prior and Canons of St. Leonards of Pyon, and this was surrendered upon his death.

His heir was identified as William, a son aged 22 years and more on the feast of All Saints (1 November) last. He was to receive Lower Hayton in Salop (held for 1/5th knight's fee from Joan, widow of Roger de Mortimer, earl of March); a messuage and 2 caracutes of land in Lawton (held for 1/6th knight's fee also from Joan); and two parts of Frome Haymond and a weir in the river Wye (Note: The weir was subenfoeffed to John de Homme for service of a rose yearly.) included in Margaret's dower with remainder to his heir (also held from Joan).

== General references ==
- Brook, W. Holden. "Lords of the Central Marches: English Aristocracy and Frontier Society, 1087–1265." (Oxford: Oxford University Press, 2008). Pages 46 to 136
- Brydges, Sir Egerton. "Collins's Peerage of England; Genealogical, Biographical, and Historical. Greatly Augmented, and Continued to the Present Time." (London: F.C. and J. Rivington, Otridge and Son; J. Nichols and Co.; T. Payne, Wilkie and Robinson; J. Walker, Clarke and Sons; W. Lowndes, R. Lea, J. Cuthell, Longman, Hurst, Rees, Orme, and Co.; White, Cochrane, and Co.; C. Law, Cadell and Davies; J. Booth, Crosby and Co.; J. Murray, J. Mawman, J. Booker, R. Scholey, J. Hatchard, R. Baldwin, Craddock and Joy; J. Fauldner, Gale, Curtis and Co.; Johnson and Co.; and G. Robinson, 1812). Volume VI, pages 1 to 22, Devereux, Viscount Hereford
- Burke, Sir Bernard. A Genealogical History of the Dormant, Abeyant, Forfeited, and Extinct Peerages of the British Empire. (Baltimore: Genealogical Publishing Co., 1978). page 169, Devereux-Barons Devereux
- Cokayne, G.E. Complete Baronetage. (New York; St. Martin's Press, 1984). Volume IV, page 296 to 306, Devereux or Deverose (including article by G.W. Watson)
- Robinson, Charles J. "A History of the Castles of Herefordshire and their Lords." (Woonton: Logaston Press, 2002). Pages 70 to 72 (Frome Castle), 125 to 129 (Lyonshall Castle), and 195
- Robinson, Charles J. "A History of the Mansions and Manors of Herefordshire." (Hereford: Books & Book Services LTD, 1872 republished).

== Notes ==
| Preceded by Crown Hands | Lord of Lyonshall; 1326–1331 | Succeeded by Giles de Badlesmere, 2nd Baron Badlesmere |
