= Norton Canon =

Village in Herefordshire, England

Coordinates: 52°08′N 2°54′W

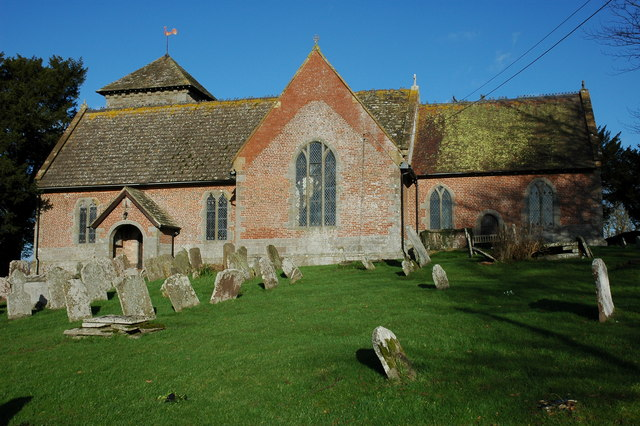
St Nicholas' church

Norton Canon is a village and civil parish in Herefordshire, England, near the A480 road and the B4230 road. The population at the 2011 Census was 242.
