= Richard de Abyndon =

Richard de Abyndon, Abendon, or Abingdon (died 1327) was an English judge.

== Biography ==
He was probably a native of Abingdon, and possibly a brother of Stephen de Abingdon who was lord mayor of London in 1315. Having taken deacon's orders, he apparently became a clerk in the exchequer; before 1274 he was granted the church of St. Sampson, Cricklade, Wiltshire, though he had not taken priest's orders (Cal. Papal Letters, 1305–42, p. 50). Soon afterwards he was presented to the living of 'Wyvelingham' in the diocese of Ely, Willingham, Cambridgeshire, and in 1284 to that of 'Parva Chert' . In the same year he was appointed chamberlain of North Wales, his business being to collect and disburse royal revenues in that newly conquered country. Before the end of the year he was sent to Dublin to collect the revenues of the vacant archbishopric, and on 23 March 1285 he was presented by Edward I to the prebend of Lusk in that cathedral. In June he was directed to collect the dues on wools and wool-fells in Ireland and devote them to fortifying towns in Wales.

Richard de Abyndon acted as mainpernor in the English parliament of June 1294, and in the following October was sent to take charge of the archbishopric of Dublin, once more vacant by the death of John de Saunford. There he remained, engaging in the war of Leinster and collecting the revenues of the diocese until November 1296, when he was ordered to restore the temporalities to the pope's nominee, William de Hotham. In 1297 he was in Cumberland raising money for the defence of England against the Scots invasion.

On 23 September 1299 Richard was appointed baron of the exchequer in the room of John de Insula; in the winter and following spring he was employed on the border with power to fine all who disobeyed the orders of the king's lieutenant, and to victual any castles that might be captured from the Scots. In 1300 he was granted custody of the vacant see of Ely, and in the following year was appointed to supervise and hasten the collection of a tenth and fifteenth in Norfolk and Suffolk. On 11 December 1304 he was collated to the prebend of Willington in Lichfield Cathedral. About the same time he received prebends in Salisbury and Wells cathedrals. In January 1306 he was cited to appear before the pope for unlawfully retaining the latter stall, but in April 1309 he was granted a papal dispensation to hold that with his other church preferments. In 1306 he was also granted a lease of the manor of Writtle in Essex, which had belonged to Robert Bruce. Richard's appointment as baron of the exchequer was not confirmed in Edward II's general patent of 16 September 1307, but he was summoned to the coronation, and on 20 January 1308 received a special patent regranting him the office with the precedence he held in the previous reign. In March he was directed to levy a tenth and fifteenth in the city of London and its suburbs. In 1310 he was selected to go on the king's service to Gascony, but in the same year appears as collecting tallage in Somerset and in London. In 1311 he was appointed a commissioner to enforce the statute of Winchester in the counties of Worcester, Gloucester, and Hereford.

In 1313, the citizens of Bristol having risen against the corporation, the king took the government of the city into his own hands, and sent Richard, with other judges, to settle the dispute. During the hearing at the Bristol guildhall a popular tumult arose, many were killed, and Richard was for a time kept a prisoner by William Randall and other citizens. He subsequently tried eighty of the offenders at the Gloucester assizes. In 1316 he was again levying a fifteenth in London, but soon after he became incapacitated, and in 1317 his place as baron was filled by John de Opham. Richard again appears as a judge in 1320. In 1316 Richard was seised of the manor of Horton, Gloucestershire; he also held property in Wiltshire and Berkshire, probably at Abingdon.

He died apparently in 1327, when two secular chaplains were endowed to say mass daily for his soul in the abbey church at Abingdon.
