= Stoke Lacy =

Village in Herefordshire, England

Coordinates: 52.1423626°N 2.5570054°W

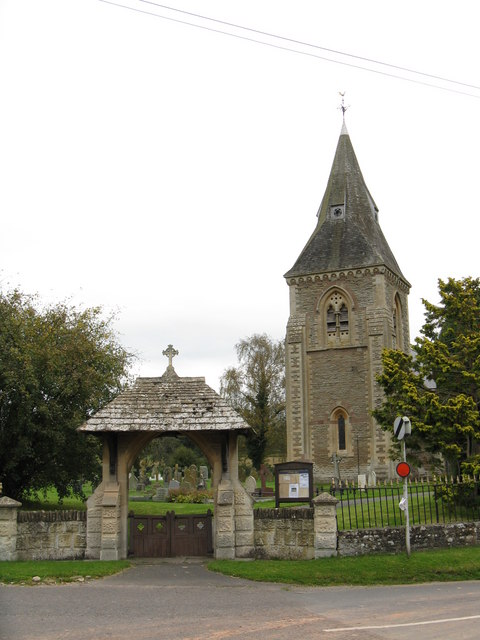
- Stoke Lacy church

- Location within Herefordshire
- Population: 364 (2011)
- OS grid reference: SO 62052 49509
- Shire county: Herefordshire
- Region: West Midlands
- Country: England
- Sovereign state: United Kingdom
- Post town: BROMYARD
- Postcode district: HR7
- Dialling code: 01885
- Police: West Mercia
- Fire: Hereford and Worcester
- Ambulance: West Midlands
- UK Parliament: North Herefordshire

Stoke Lacy is a small village and civil parish in the English county of Herefordshire.

Stoke Lacy lies on the main A465 road that connects Hereford and Bromyard and is 10.3 miles (16.6 km) from the former and 4.3 miles (6.9 km) from the latter.

== Notable people ==
- Mick Ralphs - musician, vocalist and songwriter (born)

== Local facilities ==
Stoke Lacy Village Hall is located in the centre of the village on land donated by Bill Symonds following the closure of the Symonds brewery. It has a large function room, car park and lawns.

== See also ==
- List of Parish churches in England
