= Lyonshall =

Village in Herefordshire, England

Coordinates: 52.195°N 2.971°W

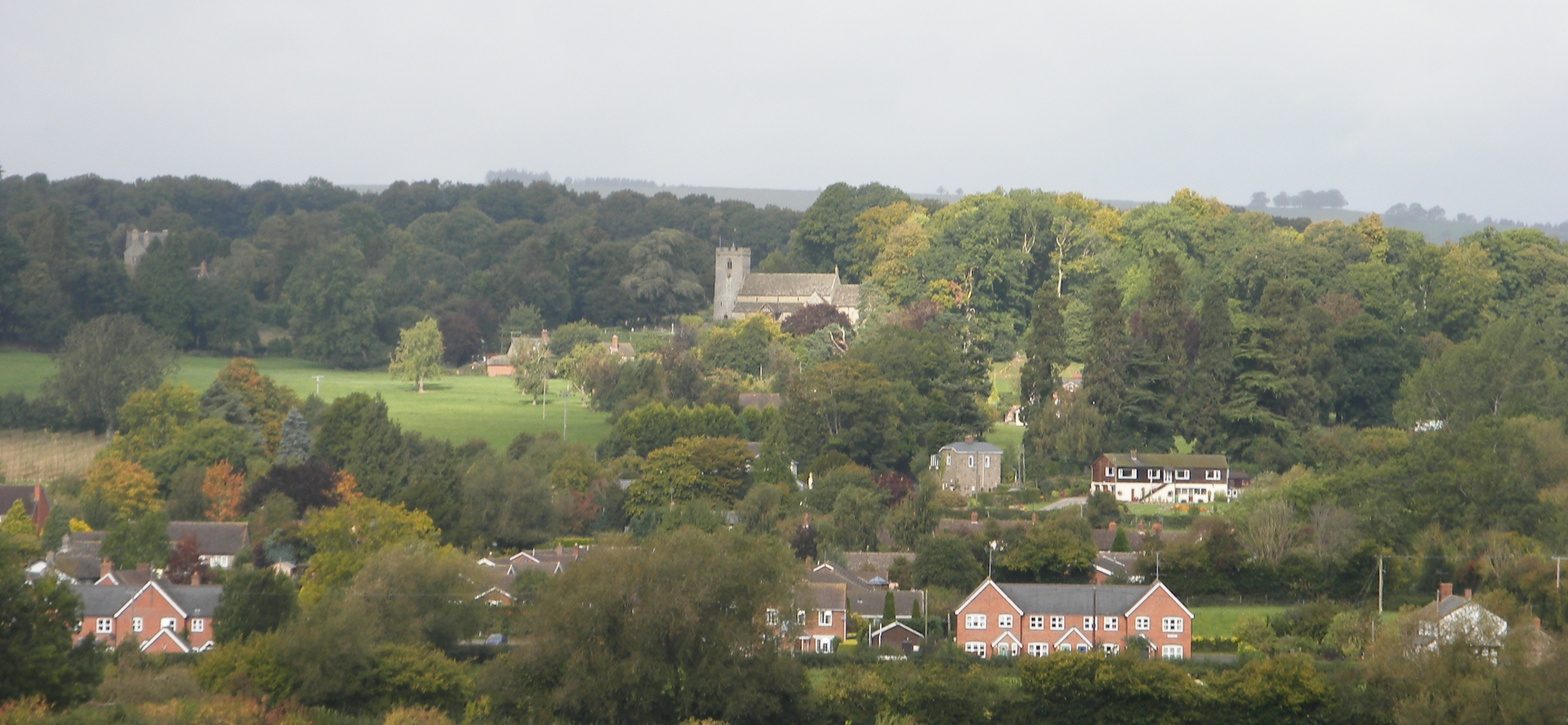
- View of Lyonshall village from the south

- Location within Herefordshire
- Population: 757 (2011)
- OS grid reference: SO3355
- Unitary authority: Herefordshire
- Shire county: Herefordshire
- Ceremonial county: Herefordshire
- Region: West Midlands
- Country: England
- Sovereign state: United Kingdom
- Post town: KINGTON
- Postcode district: HR5
- Dialling code: 01544
- Police: West Mercia
- Fire: Hereford and Worcester
- Ambulance: West Midlands
- UK Parliament: North Herefordshire

Lyonshall /ˈlaɪənzhɔːl/ or /ˈlaɪənʒɔːl/ is a historic village and civil parish in Herefordshire, England. The civil parish includes the hamlet of Penrhos. According to the 2001 Census, the civil parish had a population of 750, increasing to 757 at the 2011 Census.

== Geography ==
Lyonshall is a parish in the north-west corner of the county of Herefordshire, England. It is near the border with Wales and has significant stretches of Offa's Dyke running through it. The northern boundary of the parish is marked by the River Arrow. Lyonshall Parish covers 5,000 acres (2,000 hectares) and is on the Black and White Village Trail. The population of 750 people live in 280 households spread across the parish and centred in the village. The town of Kington is 3 miles (4.8 km) to the west of Lyonshall.

== History ==
Lyonshall was listed under the name Lenehalle the Domesday Book of 1086. The entry reads:

LYONSHALL. Walter holds from him. Thorkell held from Earl Harold. 5 hides which pay tax. In Lordship 2 ploughs; 3 villagers, 11 smallholders and 3 riding men with 5 ploughs. 5 slaves, male and female. From some men settled there 110d are given for as long as they wish. Value before 1066, 60s; now 50s.

Lyonshall is listed as being in the land of Roger of Lacy in Elsdon Hundred. Other villages in the same Hundred were Hopley's Green, Woonton, Eardisley and Letton. Also listed in Domesday Book are the adjacent parishes of Kington, Titley and Rushock, all described as non-tax paying waste lands. To the east of Lyonshall lies Pembridge, which, like Lyonshall, is described as a reasonable sized manor.

Lyonshall local dialect was recorded as part of the Survey of English Dialects. The village's name was omitted from the list of localities in the published Linguistic Atlas of England but it is shown on the maps as site 7 in Herefordshire.

=== Lyonshall Castle ===
Lyonshall Castle is a ruin in private ownership, with moat and outer enclosure covering about three acres. The building of the castle started in about 1090 when the Devereux family, sometimes referred to as d'Évreux or D'Ebroicis, held it as lords of the manor from Roger de Lacy. Lyonshall was important as one of the border manors of the Marcher lords. Its position, occupying a useful spot on the roads to and from Wales, attracted military interest, and many of the castle occupants continued to lead lives of national significance, often serving in the Royal Courts. Many of Lyonshall's lords have been significant figures, both famous and infamous. In 1322 the castle is mentioned as being part of the estates of Bartholomew de Badlesmere, 1st Baron Badlesmere, who was described on his execution as "a great Baron and as great a Rebel." After Magna Carta some of the Marcher Lords continued to be troublesome to the king. Bartholomew's only son, Giles, died without issue, Lyonshall becoming the property of his sister and co-heir Maud who married John de Vere, 7th Earl of Oxford who fought in the Battle of Crecy in 1346.

In 1382 Lyonshall passed to Simon de Burley, a royal favourite. Introduced to court at a young age, he went to sea at the age of 14 to fight the Spanish, and he was a soldier until his capture by the French at Poitou in 1369. He was a court tutor, and his former pupil, Richard II, made him Governor of Windsor and Llanstephan, Master of Falconry and Keeper of the Royal Mews; he also received manors and estates in reward for his service. However, he was charged with treason by the Duke of Gloucester and although the king and queen personally knelt to beg for his pardon, he was executed on 15 May 1388.

The castle ruins are on Historic England's Heritage at Risk Register due to their poor condition.

=== Lords of Lyonshall Castle ===
Tenure	Incumbent	Notes
1066 to 1096	Roger de Lacy (Marcher Lord)	Granted manor after Hastings and began construction of the castle in the 1090s. Forfeited after exiled for rebellion
1096 to after 1110	William Devereux
after 1110 to c1130	Walter Devereux of Lyonshall
c1130 to after 1166	Walter Devereux
after 1166 to 1187	John Devereux
1187 to 1197	Walter Devereux	The sheriff of Herefordshire held castle from 1187 to 1194 while he was under age
1197 to 1228	Stephen Devereux (Marcher Lord)	The sheriff of Herefordshire held the castle from 1197 to 1209 while he was under age
1228 to 1265	William Devereux (Marcher Lord)	William died at the Battle of Evesham, and was attainted
1265 to 1275	Roger Mortimer, 1st Baron Mortimer,	Under the Dictum of Kenilworth, Roger sold Lyonshall back to the son of William Devereux (died 1265) who was also named William.
1275 to 1300	William Devereux, Baron Devereux (of Lyonshall)	Due to the expense of participating in an expedition to Gascony in 1295 for Edward I, William granted Lyonshall for life to Roger de la Warre in exchange for an annual payment
1300	Roger de la Warre (d. 20 June 1320)	Roger de la Warre granted Lyonshall for life to Walter de Langton
1300	Walter de Langton, Bishop of Coventry and Lichfield	Walter de Langton enfeoffed William Touchet
1300 to 1305	William Touchet	Stephen Devereux (grandson of Baron William Devereux above through his son, Walter Devereux of Bodenham) seized Lyonshall by force driving Touchet out.
1305 to 1310	Stephen Devereux of Bodenham and Burghope	Stephen's petition to the King was denied as his grandfather, Baron William Devereux, was still alive. Lyonshall was taken back by the King and granted to Bartholomew de Badlesmere. Walter de Langton had fallen out of favour, and was imprisoned.
1310 to 1312	Bartholomew de Badlesmere, 1st Baron Badlesmere	In 1312 Bartholomew enfeoffed William Touchet once more.
1312 to 1322	William Touchet	Touchet and Badlesmere both suffered attainder and death, and Lyonshall returned to the crown.
1322 to 1326	Crown hands	On 18 February 1322 the king appointed Stephen Dunheved to take Lyonshall into the king's hand, and on 12 July of the same year it was committed to the care of Richard Waywayn. On 20 March 1326 Edward II granted Lyonshall to John de Felton. William Devereux of Frome, another grandson of Baron William Devereux above, seizes by force.
1326 to 1331	William Devereux of Frome	Edward II directs the escheator on this side of Trent to take Lyonshall back into the king's hand, and inquire as to the proper owner. As Touchet had no heir of his body, it was awarded to Giles de Badlesmere. The king compensated John de Felton in 1327, and denied William Devereux’s claim. William Devereux finally releases the castle to Giles de Badlesmere in 1331 (after reversal of Bartholomew de Badlesmere's attainder in 1328).
1331 to 1338	Giles de Badlesmere, 2nd Baron Badlesmere.	On Gile's death, the castle went to his sister, Maud, who had married John de Vere, 7th Earl of Oxford.
1338 to 1366	Maud de Vere, Baroness of Oxford	William Devereux sues John de Vere in 1340 to reclaim Lyonshall, and again fails.
1366 to 1371	Thomas de Vere, 8th Earl of Oxford,	On 1 April 1373 John de Burley was granted wardship of Lyonshall after the death of Thomas de Vere during the minority of his heir.
1371 to c1381	Robert de Vere, 9th Earl of Oxford	de Vere transfers Lyonshall in fee simple to Simon de Burley. Robert de Vere attainted and exiled in 1388.
c1381 to 1384	Simon de Burley	In 1382 de Burley agrees that if he dies without male issue, Lyonshall should go to John Devereux, 1st Baron Devereux, in fee. John Devereux is a direct descendant of Baron William Devereux through his son, Walter Devereux of Bodenham. In 1384 de Burley grants the castle to John Devereux with interests to John's cousin, another Walter Devereux of Bodenham (1 fee), and Kennard de la Bere, John Clanvowe, and Roger Berden among others. The third surviving male line of Baron William Devereux, Thomas Devereux of Wotton (of the Devereux family of Frome), were also granted an interest. De Burley was attainted and died 18 May 1388. (Membrane 43, 9 Dec at Westminster,14 Richard II)
1384 to 1393	John Devereux, 1st Baron Devereux (of Whitechurch Maund)	Walter Devereux of Bodenham and Weobley, Herefordshire holding 1 fee. Thomas Devereux of Wotton, Herefordshire (of the Devereux family of Frome) holds an interest.
1393 to 1396	John Devereux II, 2nd Baron Devereux	On the 2nd Baron's death, his sister Joan Devereux retained control of Lyonshall. Walter Devereux of Bodenham and Weobley, and Thomas Devereux of Wotton retain their interests.
c1396 to 1409	Joan Fitzwalter, 3rd Baroness Devereux and Baroness FitzWalter	Joan holds Lyonshall on behalf of her sons, Humphrey and Walter FitzWalter. After the death of her husband, Baron Walter FitzWalter, she conveys Lyonshall in 1407 to 'Sir William Bourchier and others' in trust for self and sons. Walter Devereux of Bodenham and Weobley holds 1 fee until his death in 1403, and then his widow, Agnes (Crophull) Devereux holds it as part of her dower and conveys it to John Merbury when they marry after her second husband, John Parr, dies. Thomas Devereux of Wotton continues to hold his interest. On the death of Joan (Devereux) Fitzwalter in 1409, Lyonshall passes to the control of John Merbury by right of the dower of his wife Agnes (Crophul Devereux Parr).
1409 to 1436	John Merbury, High Sheriff of Herefordshire	John Merbury is indicated in 1428 as holding the one share of Lyonshall previously held by the Lord Fitzwalter. In 1429, Thomas Devereux of Wotton deeds away his interests and that of his heirs, the grandchildren of his brother Sir John Devereux of the Hill (of the Devereux family of Frome). (Note: Thomas Deveros otherwise Devereus of Wotton co. Herforde esquire, brother of John Deveros otherwise Devereus knight, father of Margaret Cheyne mother of Joan wife of Henry Chadirton and of Katherine wife of Richard Wynnesley and grandmother of Humphrey Stafforde son and heir of Elizabeth Stafforde sister of the said Joan and Katherine who are cousins and heirs of the said Thomas, to Humphrey duke of Gloucestre, Henry earl of Northumberland, Humphrey earl of Stafforde, Lewis Robbyssart lord Bourghchier, Reynold West, Maurice Bruyn, Edward Benstede knights, John Merbury, Richard Baynarde, Robert Darcy, John Terell, John Russell, Lewis John, Richard Fox, Robert Molyngton esquires, Richard Durivalle chaplain and William Fawkeswelle, their heirs and assigned. Quitclaim with warranty of the castle, manor and lordship of Leonhales otherwise Lenhales co. Hereford, and of all other lands, rents, reversions and services therein. Witnesses: John Brugge, Thomas Bromwyche the elder esquires, John Monyngton, Hugh Monyngton, Thomas Brugge of Ley. Dated Webbeley, 3 July 4HenryVI. Memorandum of acknowledgement at Webbeley co. Herforde 11 April this year before the prior of Wormesley, by virtue of a dedimus potestatem which is on the chancery file for this year.) With his death between 1429 and 1436 the male line of the Devereux family of Frome failed. Upon Agnes (Crophul Devereux Parr) Merbury's death on 9 February 1436, Lyonshall passed to her heir and grandson, another Walter Devereux of Bodenham and Weobley who had married Elizabeth, daughter of John Merbury by a previous marriage. (Note: 10 April 1436. Inquest taken at Kyrkeby Kendale for Agnes, who was the wife of John Parr, Esquire, deceased. Agnes died 9 February 1436. Walter Deverous is her kinsman and next heir, viz. son of Walter Deverous, knight, son of the same Agnes, aged 24 years.)
1436 to 1459	Walter Devereux
1459 to 1485	Walter Devereux, 8th Baron Ferrers of Chartley	Lyonshall Castle has fallen into ruins, and is no longer a residence.
General References:

== Community ==
The parish has the church of St Michael & All Angels and the Lyonshall Memorial Hall. The Parish Council is well supported and achieves improvements around the parish and voices opinions of parishioners to the Herefordshire Council. There is no post office in the village and the Royal George pub is closed.

In the 19th century, from about 1870 to sometime in the 1890s, the Vicar of Lyonshall was Charles Madison Green, whose wife, Ella, was the eldest sister of author H. Rider Haggard, famous for King Solomon's Mines and She.

== Economy ==
Lyonshall parish has a largely agricultural economy. It contains six poultry farms, produces blackcurrants, potatoes and livestock, and arable crops.

Major businesses include one that owns farms, hires marquees and runs a fleet of lorries; and another which employs almost 100 people in caring for around 50 elderly residents at an historic manor house. Other companies include that producing hand-made beds and other furniture specialising in the use of sustainable local oak, a waste management company, and a company providing drainage and plumbing services. With the larger businesses are smaller, often one-person parish enterprises.

The Royal George pub, now closed, is in the centre of the village and is a black and white building dating to 1600. Since its closure and purchase from its previous owner, it has fallen into a poor state of repair. It was originally named The George, but was renamed after the naval disaster of 1782 when the flagship The Royal George sank at Spithead with the loss of 900 lives.

== In popular culture ==
Sue Gee's 2004 novel The Mysteries of Glass concerns a curate working in the parish of St. Michael and All Angels in Lyonshall in 1860/1.

== Gallery ==
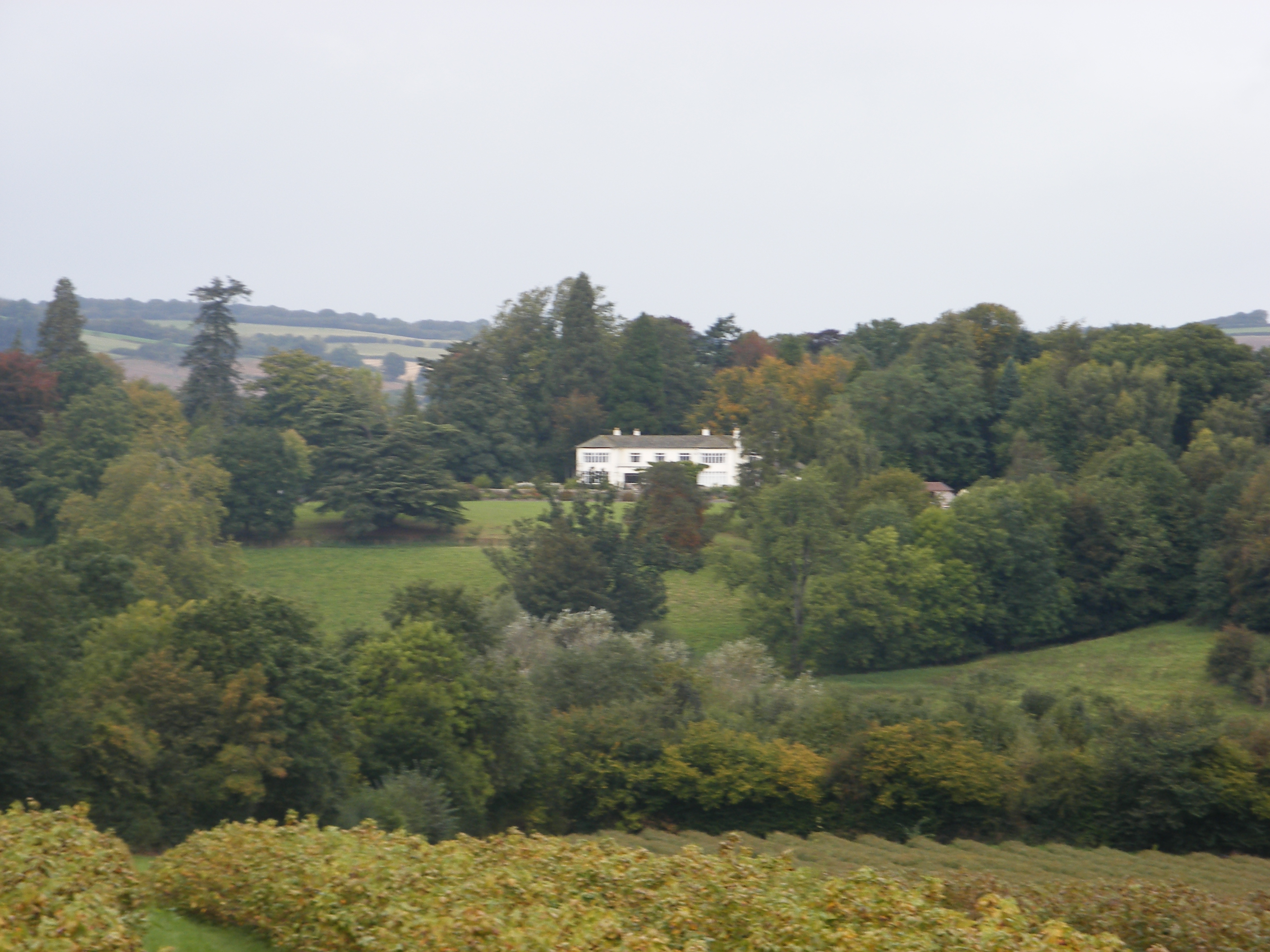
The Whittern

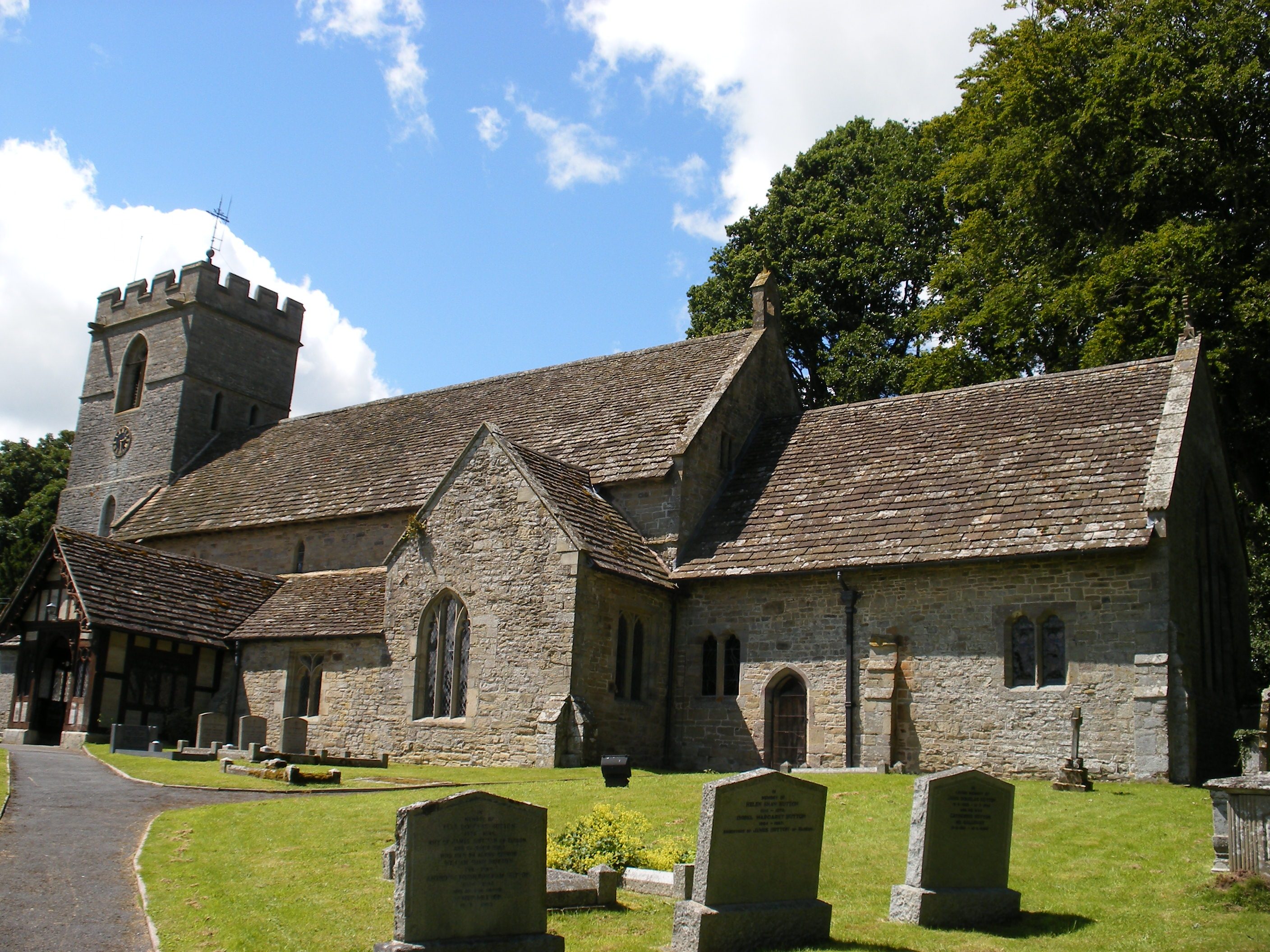
Lyonshall Church

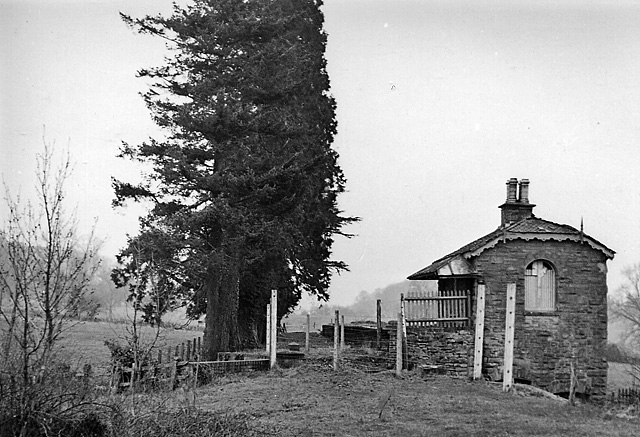
At one time Lyonshall had a Great Western Railway station
