= Bodenham =

Village in Herefordshire, England

Coordinates: 52.15745°N 2.6916817°W

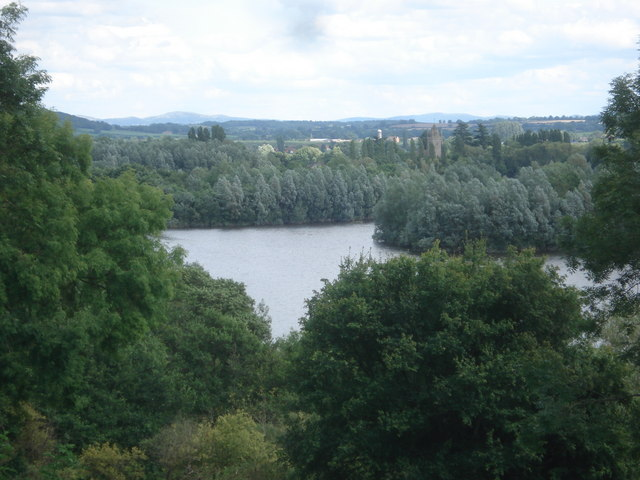
- Bodenham lake and church

- Location within Herefordshire
- Population: 998
- OS grid reference: SO544506
- Civil parish: Bodenham
- Unitary authority: Herefordshire
- Ceremonial county: Herefordshire
- Region: West Midlands
- Country: England
- Sovereign state: United Kingdom
- Post town: Hereford
- Postcode district: HR1
- Dialling code: 01568
- Police: West Mercia
- Fire: Hereford and Worcester
- Ambulance: West Midlands
- UK Parliament: North Herefordshire

Bodenham is a village and civil parish in Herefordshire, England, and on a bend in the River Lugg, about seven miles south of Leominster. According to the 2001 census, it had a population of 1,024, reducing to 998 at the 2011 census.

The village is mentioned twice in the Domesday Book, where is described as having a mill and 34 households. Lords of the two manors were Osbern, the son of Richard, and Edwy in 1066, and Osbern, the son of Richard, and Herbert (of Furches) in 1086.

Anne Devereux, the Countess of Pembroke, was born at Bodenham.

Bodenham church is St Michael and All Angels. It has a pub, England's Gate, and a school, St Michael's CofE Primary School.
