= Walter Devereux =

Walter Devereux may refer to:

- Walter Devereux (born 1173) (1173–c. 1197), Anglo-Norman nobleman
- Walter Devereux of Bodenham and Bromwich (c. 1221–1292), Anglo-Norman knight and sheriff of Herefordshire
- Walter Devereux (died 1305) (c. 1266–1305), member of a prominent knightly family in Herefordshire
- Walter Devereux (died c. 1383) (c. 1339–c. 1383), member of parliament, sheriff, and justice of the peace for Hereford
- Walter Devereux (died 1402) (c. 1361–1402), MP for Herefordshire 1401
- Walter Devereux (1387–1419), knight of Herefordshire
- Walter Devereux (1411–1459), Lord Chancellor of Ireland 1449–c. 1451
- Walter Devereux, 8th Baron Ferrers of Chartley (c. 1431–1485), son of the above, Yorkist politician and military officer during the Wars of the Roses
- Walter Devereux (MP for Cardiganshire), MP for Cardiganshire, 1547
- Walter Devereux, 1st Viscount Hereford (1488–1558), grandson of the above, Custos Rotulorum of Cardiganshire from 1543 to 1558
- Walter Devereux, 1st Earl of Essex (1541–1576), grandson of the above, Earl Marshal of Ireland in 1576
- Walter Devereux (assassin) (died 1640), Irish assassin of Albrecht von Wallenstein
- Walter Devereux (died 1641), MP for Pembroke, Tamworth and Lichfield
- Walter Devereux, 5th Viscount Hereford (1578–1658), grandson of the first Viscount, MP for Stafford and Worcestershire
- Walter Devereux (died 1683), MP for Orford

== See also ==
- Walter Deveraux, a fictional character in Hollyoaks
