= The Witch House =

Historic house in Massachusetts, United States

- Jonathan Corwin House
- U.S. Historic district – Contributing property
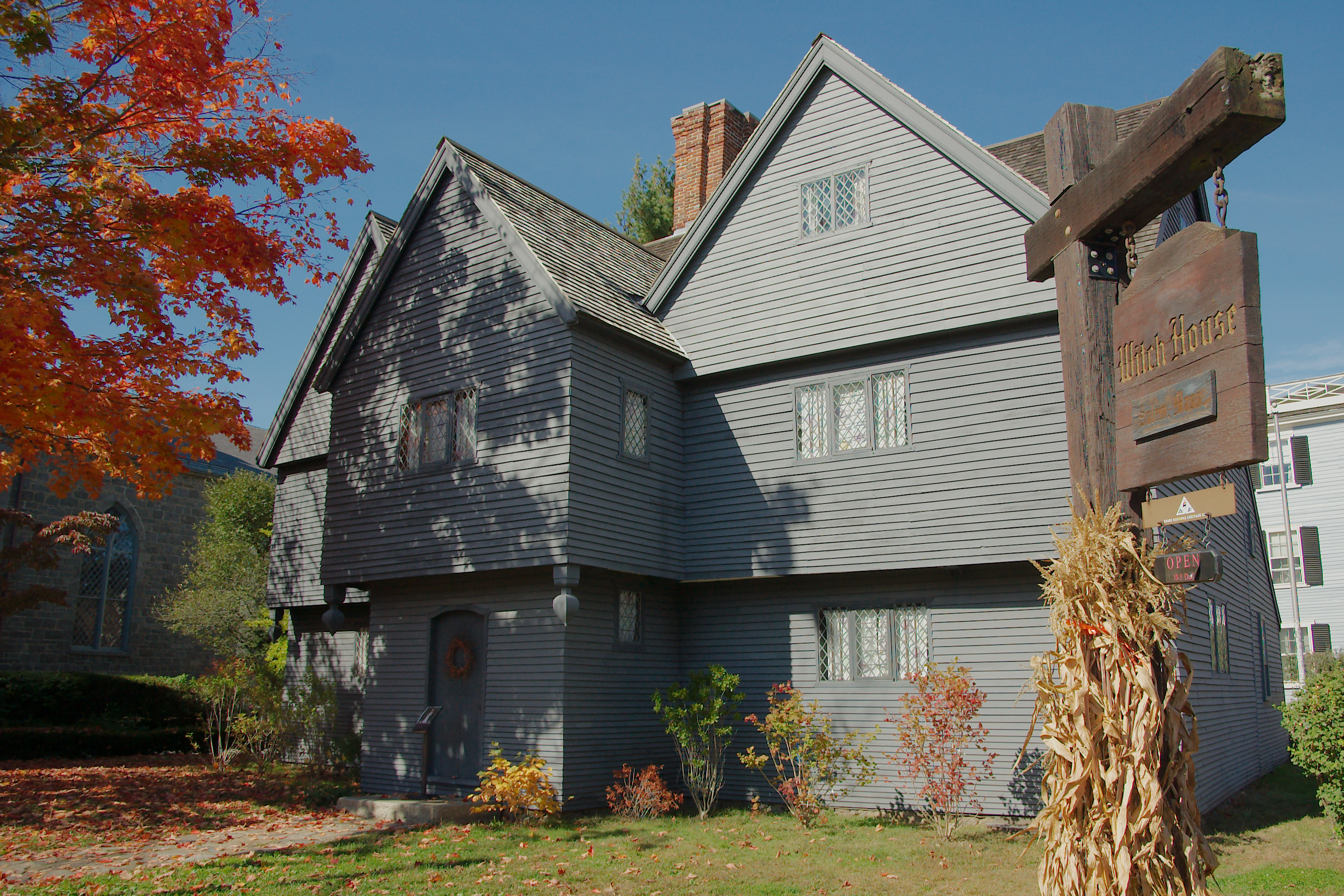
- Location: 310 Essex Street; Salem, Massachusetts
- Coordinates: 42.5215°N 70.8989°W
- Built: 1642 (Traditional) c. 1675 (MACRIS)
- Restored: 1945
- Part of: Chestnut Street District (ID73000312)

The Jonathan Corwin House, known locally as The Witch House, is a historic house museum in Salem, Massachusetts. It was the home of Judge Jonathan Corwin (1640–1718) and is one of the few structures still standing in Salem with direct ties to the Salem witch trials of 1692. Corwin bought the house in 1675 when he was 35 and when the house was still unfinished, and lived there for more than 40 years; the house remained in the Corwin family until the mid-19th century. Managed by the City of Salem as a museum, offers self-guided tours that provide a scholarly exploration of the Salem Witch Trials, as noted by the Salem Witch Museum.

== History ==
Captain Nathaniel Davenport originally owned the land where the Witch House at 310 Essex Street now resides. While Davenport started construction of the house, it was left unfinished when Jonathan Corwin bought it in 1675. Corwin quickly completed the house which at the time had "steep gables a large central chimney, and a projecting two-story entry porch at the center of the facade". During the Salem witch trials of 1692, Corwin was called upon to investigate the claims of diabolical activity when a surge of witchcraft accusations arose in Salem Village (now Danvers) and neighboring communities. He took the place of Judge Nathaniel Saltonstall, who resigned after the execution of Bridget Bishop. Corwin served on the Court of Oyer and Terminer, which ultimately sent 19 people to the gallows. Those accused during this period were brought to Corwin's home for "pretrial examinations".

After the trials, the house eventually passed to Corwin's grandson George who owned it until his death in 1746. Sarah Corwin (now widowed) altered and enlarged the residence sometime between 1746 and 1747. According to architectural historian Abbott Lowell Cummings, rooms were added above the rear and lean-to, the entire facade gables were removed, and a gambrel roof was built over the entire frame. The residence fell out of the Corwin family by 1836, and was subsequently owned by a resident named Sarah Cushing until 1851. George Farrington, a pharmacist, bought the house in 1856, and later built an annex towards Essex Street for his medical business. Farrington was the first resident to refer to his home as the “Witch House”, this in turn attracted tourists who heard Farrington claim that the Witch Trials had occurred in the parlor. An additional rear-ell was added to the house in 1874, and by 1897 "succeeding additions were made to the rear".

Around the turn of the twentieth century, the house was divided into apartments and businesses which included the drug store (by this time owned by Upton and Frisbee), and an antiques parlor. This lasted until around 1940 when the structure was threatened with demolition to accommodate the widening of North Street. In order to save the house, it was moved back from the street to its current location. The building was then restored to its presumed 17th century appearance in 1945 by architects Frank Chouteau Brown and Gordon Robb. According to MACRIS, the reconstruction of numerous missing elements was based upon documentary research, building archaeology, and presumption. While the result was an older appearance, the house today consists of "much twentieth-century material". The residence now operates as a museum by the City of Salem and is open seasonally.

== Dating ==
While there are no known dendrochronology studies to confirm an exact build date, various theories have been proposed over time by historians since the 1830s. The main problem with providing a date is explaining what happened before Jonathan Corwin bought the partly completed house in 1675. The first to offer a proposed build date were Corwin's descendants who claimed (without evidence) that the house was built in 1642. Victorian-era scholars such as William Phineas Upham argued that the house had been built even earlier. This (now unlikely) proposal suggests that the Witch House was built in the 1620s or 1630s and that Roger Williams lived in it before he founded Providence Plantations. As it's known for certain that Jonathan Corwin purchased/completed the house sometime in 1675, this particular date is now used as circa.

== In popular culture ==
In 2011, the Ghost Adventures crew featured the Witch House during season 4. The Witch House also appears in the opening scenes of the movie Hocus Pocus 2, which takes place in 1653. It's unknown if historical emphasis was placed on Salem village while creating a backstory for the Sanderson sisters.

== Gallery ==
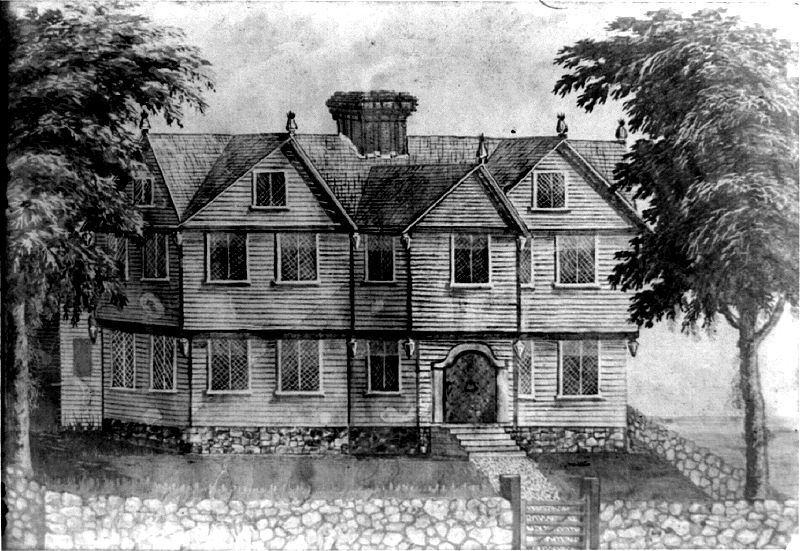
Sketch of the "Witch House" (hypothetical original look) (Note: According to the Library of Congress, this sketch dates to c.1859.)

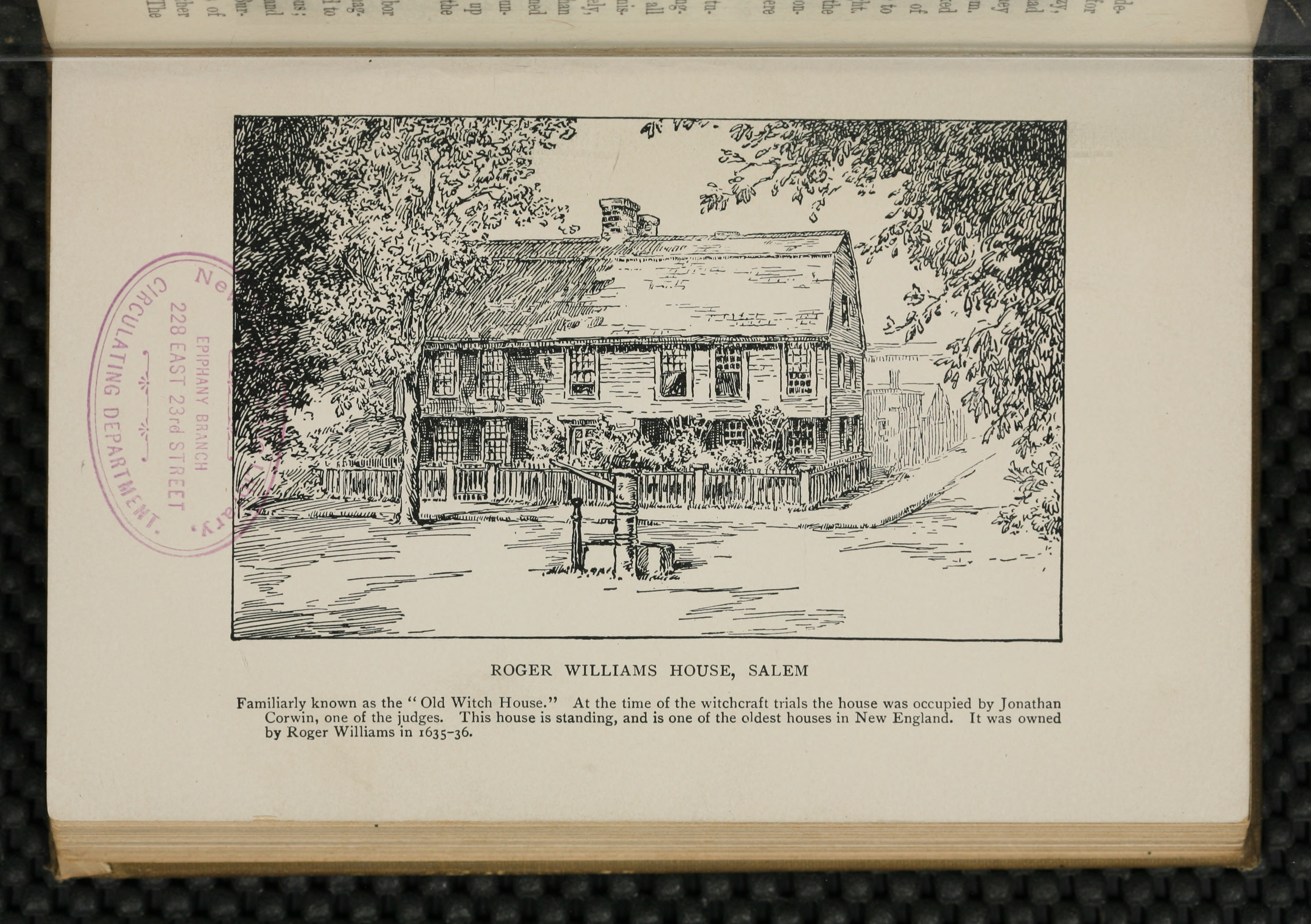
Sketch of the "Witch House" c. 1840 by Nathaniel Hawthorne (Note: This illustration can be found in "Grandfather's Chair", which is part of Hawthorne's short story collection.)

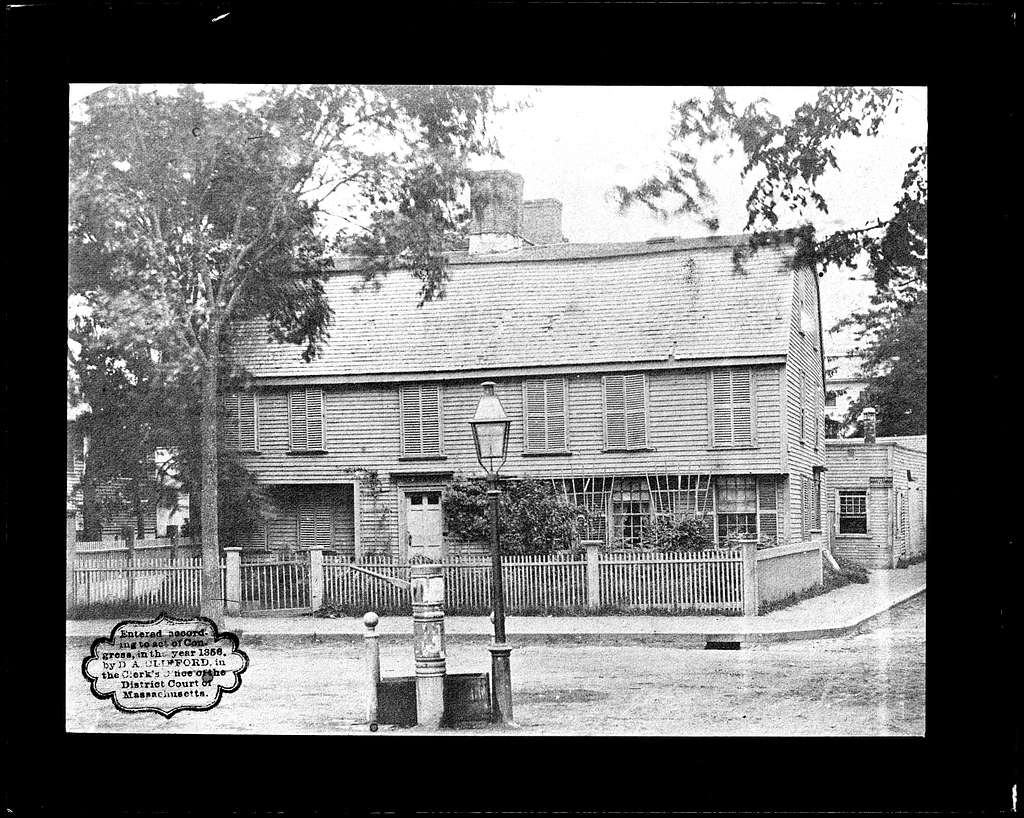
"Witch House" taken c. 1856 from Essex Street.

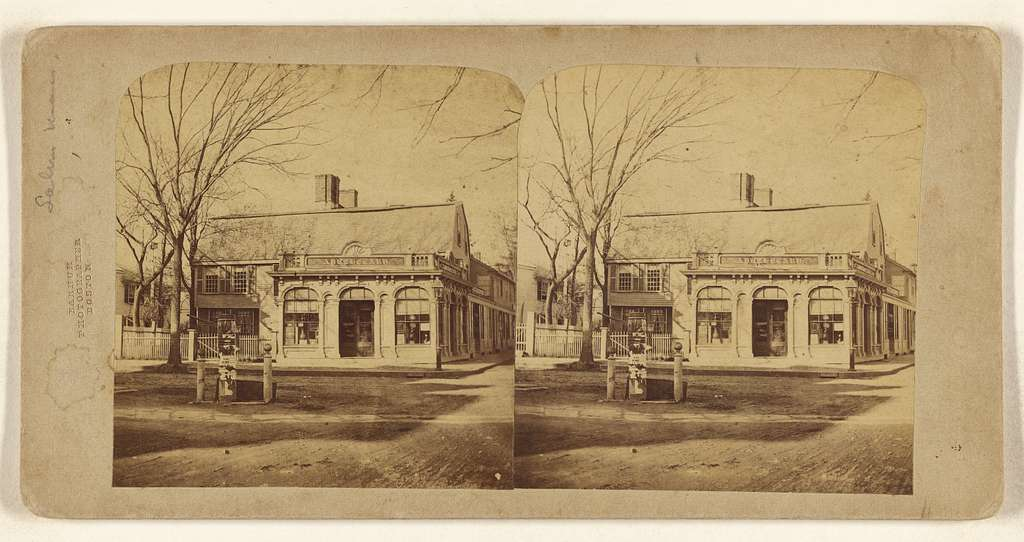
"Witch House" taken in 1865 from Essex/North Street.

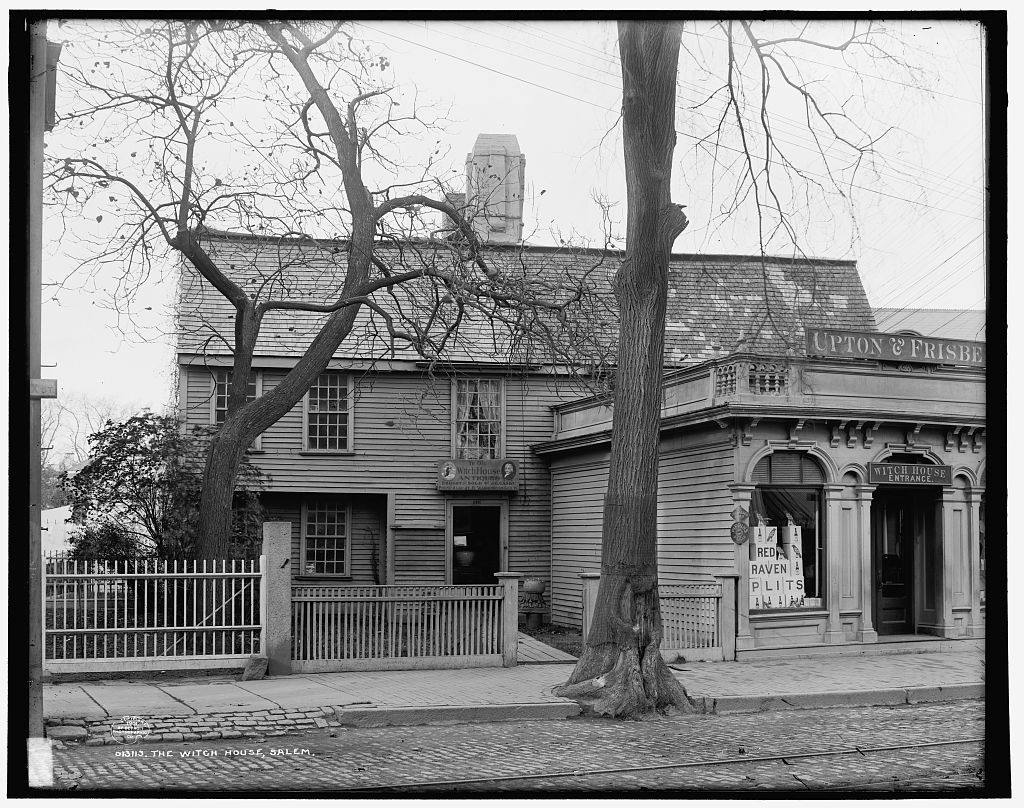
"Witch House" taken in 1901 from Essex Street.

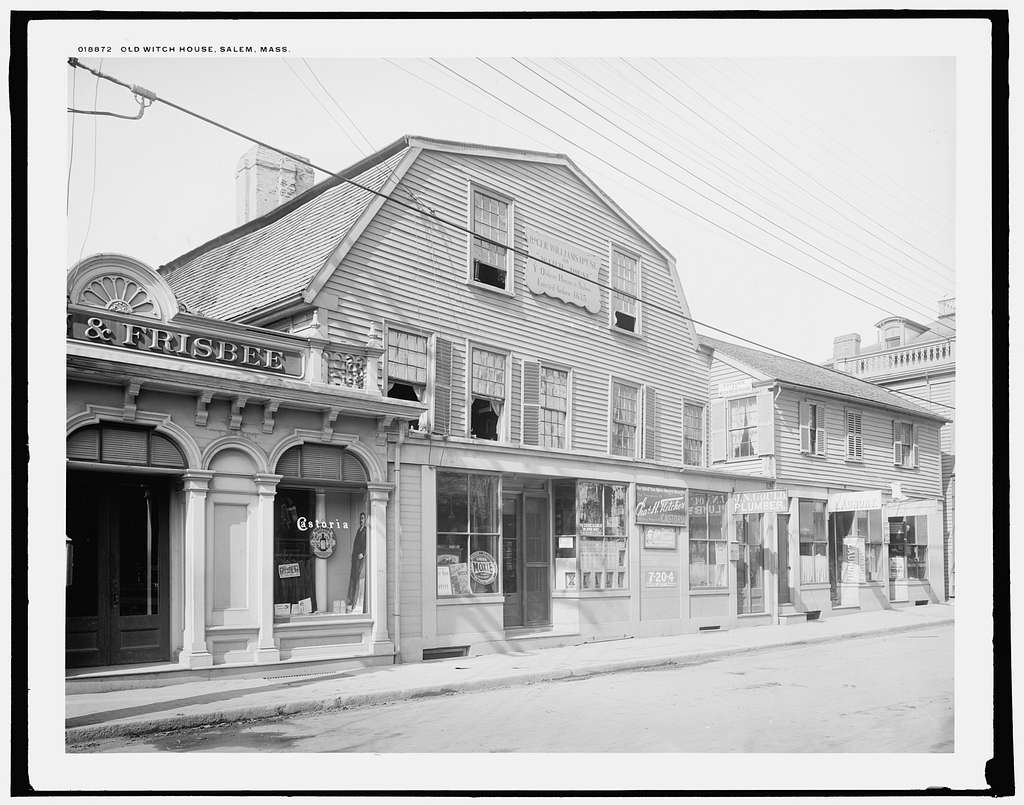
"Witch House" (center) taken in 1906 from North Street.

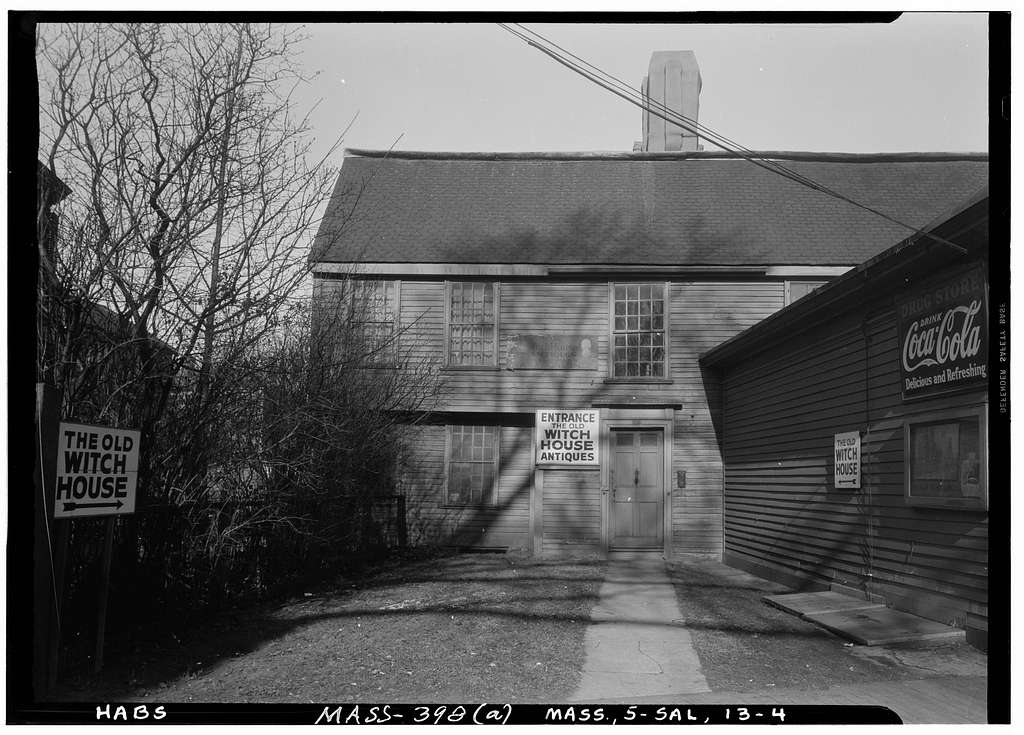
"Witch House" taken in 1944 from Essex Street.

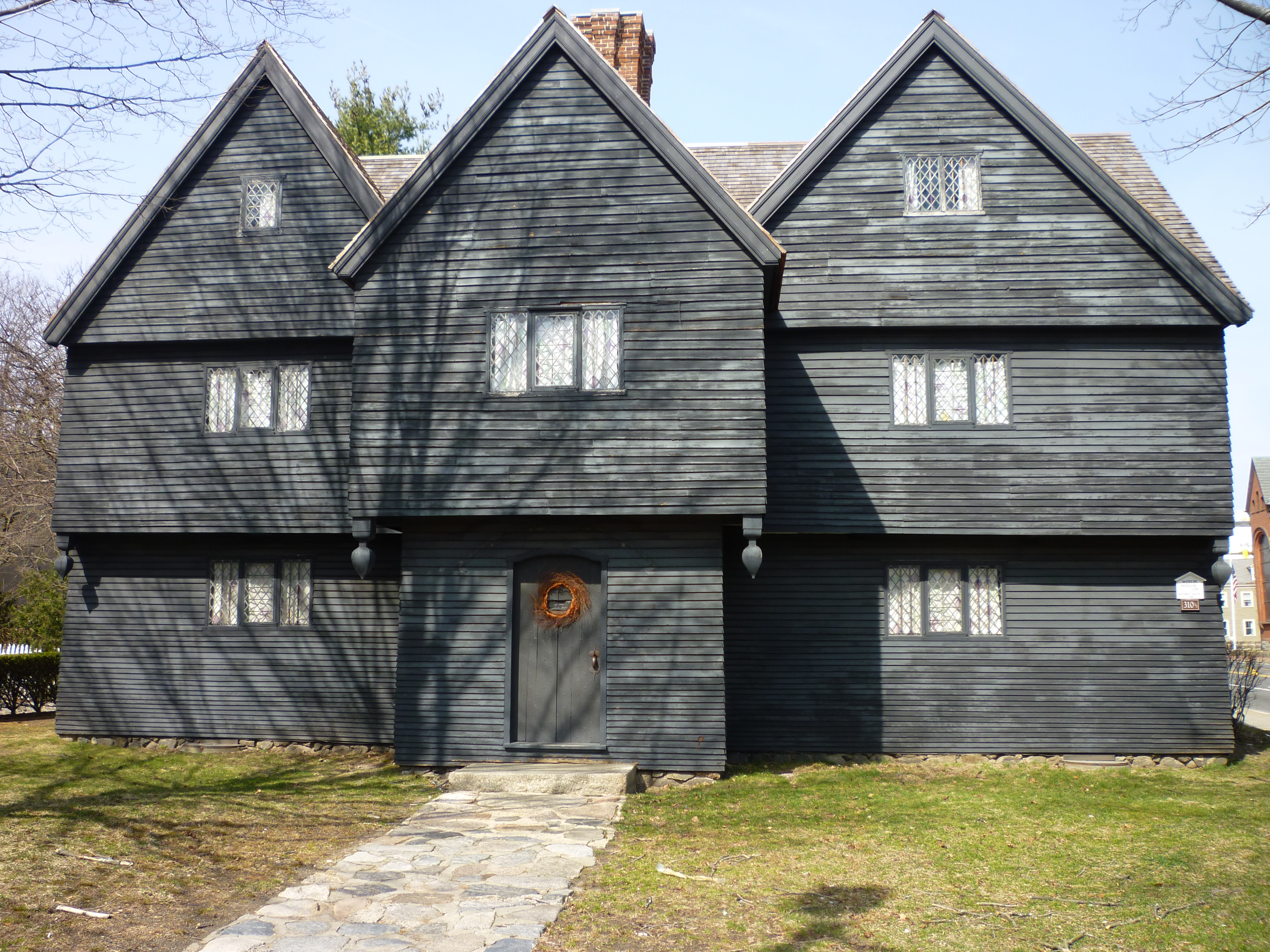
Front of the "Witch House" taken in 2010 from Essex Street.

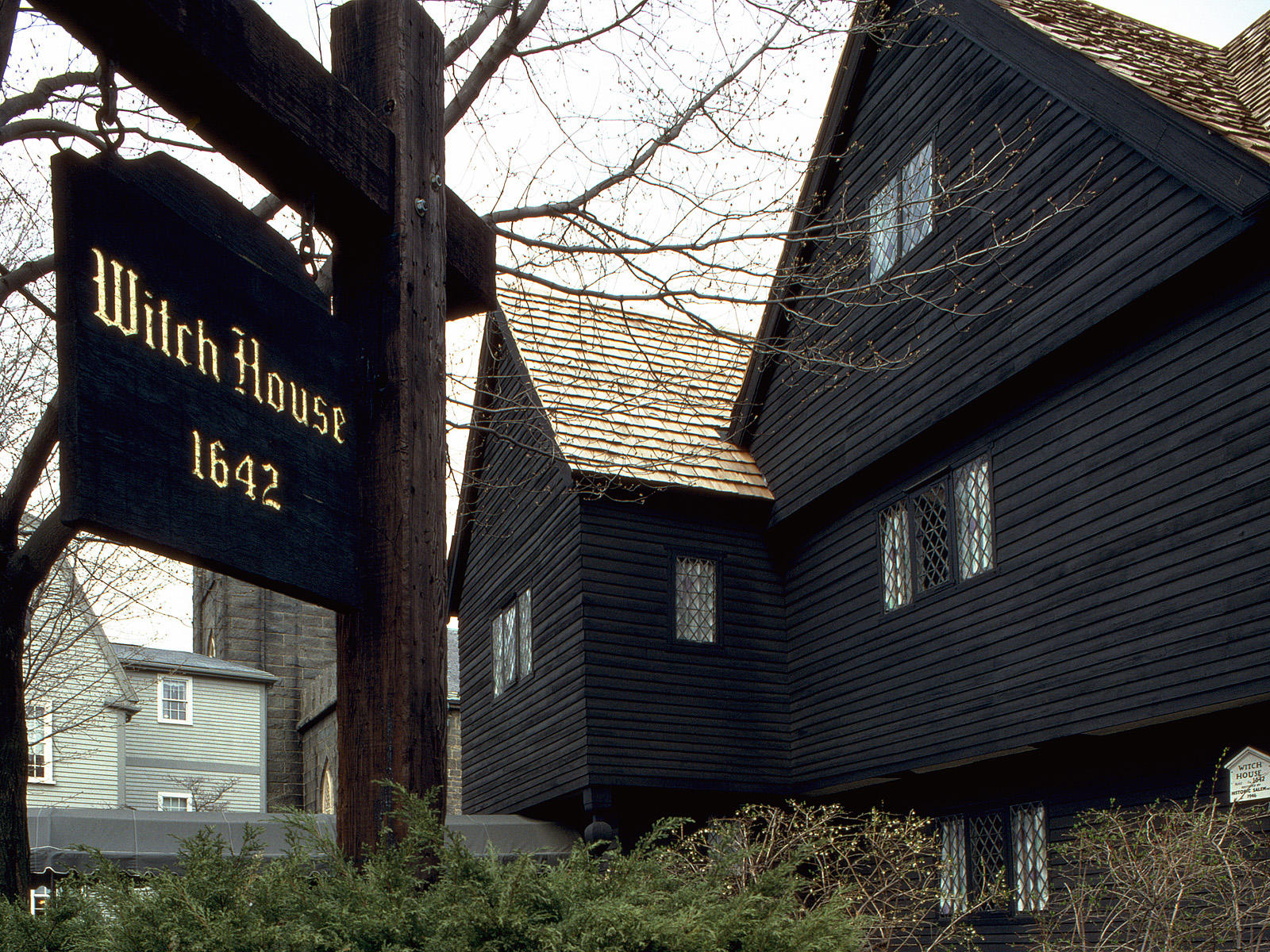
Angled view taken in 2010 showing a sign with the traditional build date.

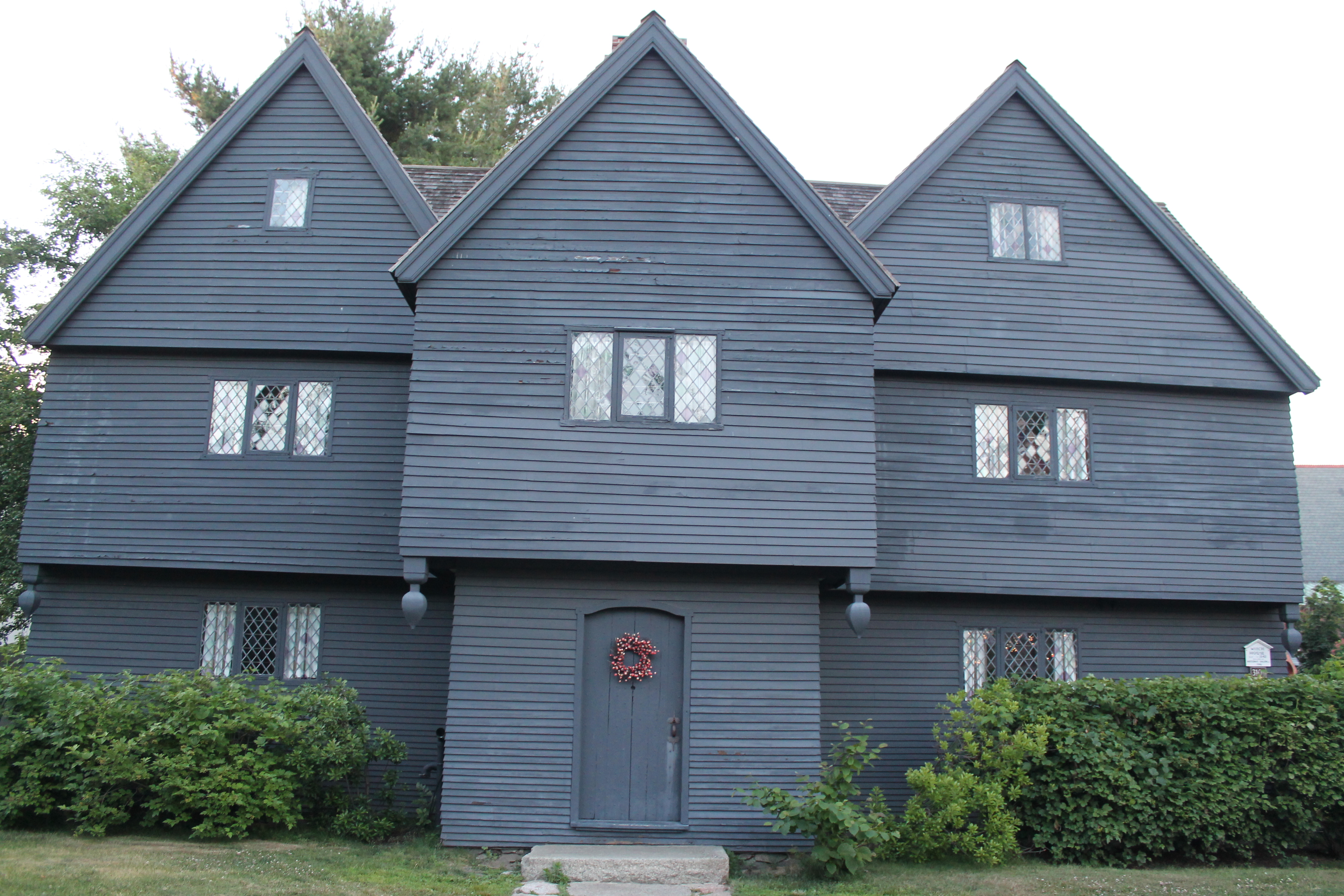
"Witch House" in 2018

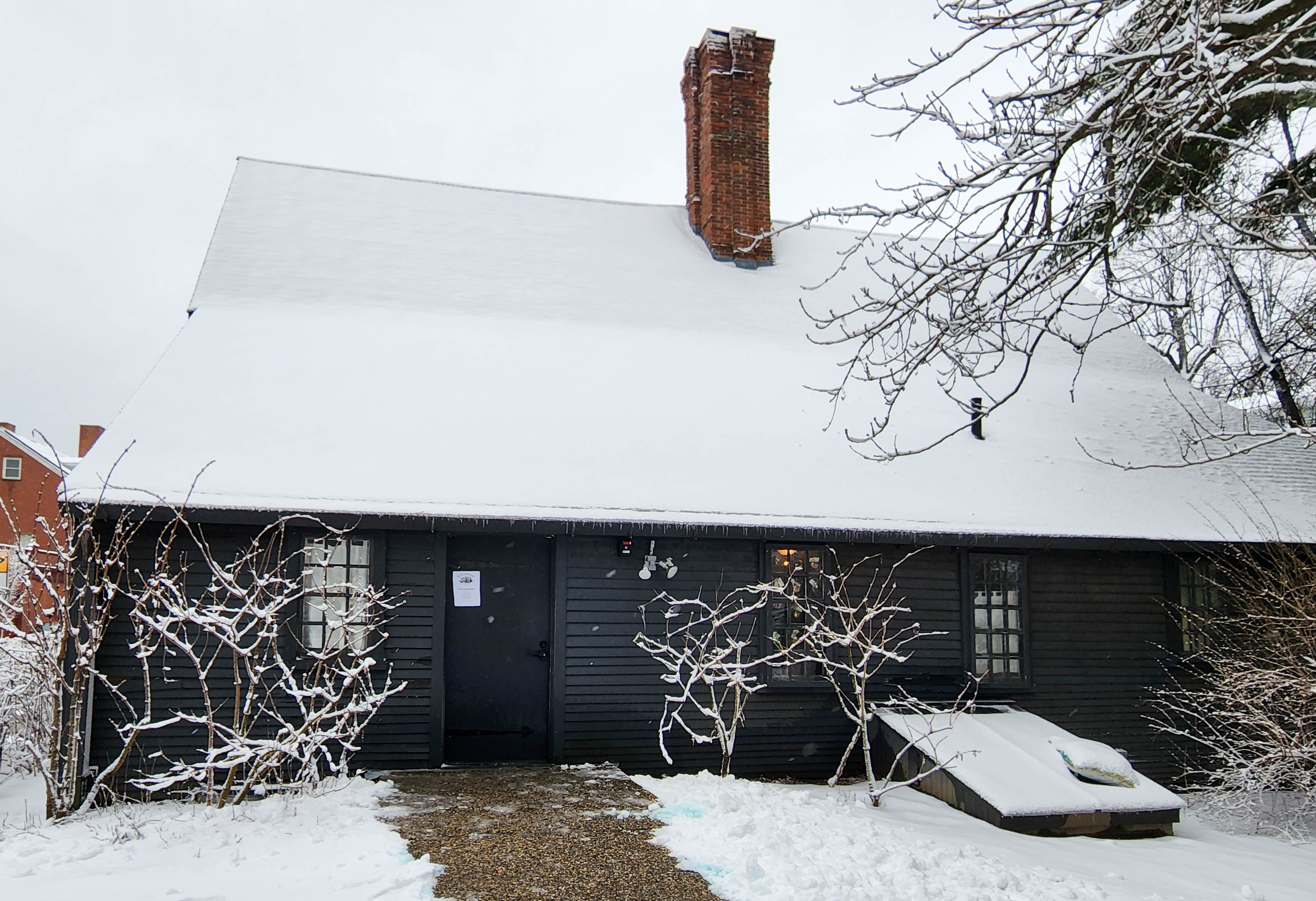
Rear of the house in 2023.

== See also ==
- Ropes Mansion - also nearby on Essex Street.
- List of historic houses in Massachusetts
- List of the oldest buildings in Massachusetts
- List of the oldest buildings in the United States
