= Amerton Farm =

Visitor attraction and farm in Staffordshire, England

- Interactive map of Amerton Farm
- Town/City: Amerton, Stowe-by-Chartley, Staffordshire
- Country: England
- Coordinates: 52°50′51″N 2°00′40″W
- Established: 1984
- Owner: Amerton Farm Ltd
- Status: Open to the public
- Website: www.amertonfarm.co.uk

Amerton Farm is a family-run visitor attraction, working farm, and craft centre located in the village of Amerton, near Stowe-by-Chartley in Staffordshire, England. Originally a working dairy farm, the site has expanded since the 1980s to include a farm shop, retail village, indoor play areas, cafe, and an adjacent heritage railway.

== History ==
Amerton Farm first opened to the general public in 1984. The enterprise was started by Anne Williams, who initially sold fresh cream and eggs from the back door of the farmhouse. Following early success, the farm began making ice cream and converted the original cowshed into a traditional tearoom. The site rapidly expanded to include other retail and leisure enterprises, transitioning from a purely agricultural business to a rural visitor centre.

== Attractions and facilities ==
The farm attracts over 400,000 visitors a year and operates a variety of family-focused attractions and local businesses.

- Billy's Farm Barn: A dedicated indoor and outdoor adventure play area for children, featuring air bouncers and tractor and trailer rides.
- Amerton Artisans and Craft Centre: A retail courtyard housing independent local businesses, including Amerton Pottery, a traditional blacksmith forge, jewellery makers, and a garden centre.
- Belle À Pepe Tearoom: A licensed restaurant serving breakfasts, lunches, and takeaway food.
- Farm Shop and Bakery: The farm shop focuses on locally sourced produce, selling jams, pickles, local cheeses, meats, locally produced wine, and Amerton Farm beer. A sweet shop and an on-site bakery provide bread, pies, and custom celebration cakes.
- Animals and Wildlife: The farm retains a traditional farmyard environment where visitors can feed and interact with animals such as cattle, pigs, ponies, and poultry.

=== Amerton Railway ===
Adjacent to the farm site is Amerton Railway, a 2 ft (610 mm) narrow-gauge heritage railway operated by volunteers. The railway runs for approximately one mile through the surrounding countryside and features a collection of historic industrial steam and diesel locomotives.
