= Walter Devereux (died 1402) =

English knight

Walter Devereux of Bodenham and Weobley
- Born: c 1361
- Died: 25 July 1402 (aged 40–41); Battle of Pilleth
- Buried: Weobley Church
- Spouse: Agnes Crophull
- Issue: Walter Devereux of Bodenham; Richard Devereux; John Devereux; Thomas Devereux; Margaret Devereux; Elizabeth Devereux
- Father: Walter Devereux of Bodenham
- Mother: Maud

Sir Walter Devereux of Bodenham and Weobley was a prominent knight in Herefordshire during the reigns of Richard II and Henry IV. He represented Hereford in Parliament, and gave rise to the Devereux Earls of Essex and Viscounts of Hereford.

== Ancestry and childhood ==
Walter Devereux was born about 1361, the son of Sir Walter Devereux (died c. 1383) of Bodenham and a woman named Maud. His father was the cousin of John Devereux, 1st Baron Devereux of Whitchurch Maund, (Note: They shared common descent from Walter Devereux of Bodenham, son of William Devereux, Baron Devereux of Lyonshall. For this Walter Devereux the descent was: Walter Devereux of Bodenham, Stephen Devereux of Bodenham and Burghope, William Devereux of Bodenham, Walter Devereux of Bodenham, and Walter Devereux of Bodenham and Weobley. The descent of Baron John Devereux was: Walter Devereux of Bodenham, John Devereux of Manne, and John Devereux of Whitchurch Maund.) (Note: He was identified only as 'corson', and bequeathed 20 pounds in the Will entered June 1385 of John Devereux, 1st Baron Devereux.) and they were close allies. Walter's grandfather, William Devereux of Bodenham, had made land concessions in Bodenham Parish (Hereford) to John Devereux about 1360, and throughout his life Baron Devereux appears to have promoted the careers of his cousin's family in the royal household.

His arms were: Argent a fesse gules, in chief three torteaux.

== Career ==
When Walter Devereux came of age, he joined the retinue of Thomas of Woodstock, 1st Duke of Gloucester, like his father. He was a King's esquire by 8 February 1382 when he attended Parliament with his father. Both Devereux's were appointed to a Royal Commission to arrest William Solers for disseising John ap William ap Jankin of the manor of Dorstone. Walter Devereux was also granted for life the office of Constable of Builth Castle in Radnorshire during the minority of Roger Mortimer, 4th Earl of March.

On 22 December 1384, Mary de Bohun had come of age, and the final transfer of the estate of the Earl of Hereford occurred to her husband, Henry Bolingbroke. These included Walter's fee in Bodenham held by his grandfather, William Devereux, and 1/2 fee in Moccas and Sutton held by his father, Walter Devereux (died c. 1383).

Walter Devereux was assigned on 20 February 1385 to investigate the murder of John Kings of Whiteborn, and any who may have harbored the murderers. Later on 26 February 1388 during the “Merciless Parliament” he was relieved of any responsibility for failing to execute this order claiming under oath that he did not receive notice of it.

On 26 April 1385 he was appointed to a Commission of array for Herefordshire to prepare for an imminent French invasion. Devereux participated in Richard II's expedition to Scotland in the summer of 1385, and probably was knighted during this time. On 9 November 1385 Walter was appointed Justice of the Peace, and to a commission of Oyer and terminer for Herefordshire along with his liege, Thomas of Woodstock. He would continue to hold the position of Justice of the Peace through 1399.

In the “Wonderful Parliament” of 1 October 1386 Richard II was forced to accept a commission of 11 members to control the royal household for 1 year to counter growing anger with his financial excesses. Walter's cousin and ally, Baron John Devereux, was a member of the commission. The Lords Appellant led this movement and included Thomas of Woodstock, Duke of Gloucester; Richard FitzAlan, Earl of Arundel; Thomas de Beachamp, Earl of Warwick; and later Henry Bolingbroke, Earl of Derby; and Thomas de Mowbray, Earl of Nottingham. The Earl of Arundel was appointed admiral of the fleet on 10 December 1386, and Sir Walter Devereux served under Captain Sir Thomas Mortimer in his naval expedition. Arundel took command of the fleet on 16 March 1387 at Sandwich, and led them in the Battle of Cadsand on 24 March. Fought off Margate, the English were victorious over a Franco-Flemish fleet ending the threat of a French invasion. The English pursued the remnants of the enemy to Sluis, and then pillaged the surrounding countryside before bringing the fleet back to England on 14 April. They then made another foray to Brest in Brittany before returning to England in June 1387.

Walter Devereux was probably present at the Battle of Radcot Bridge on 19 December 1387 when Thomas of Woodstock led the Appellants to victory. He also attended the “Merciless Parliament” on 3 February 1388 where he received a writ of supersedeas omnino noted above. At the close of the parliament on 20 March a writ was issued to Walter Devereux and the sheriff of Herefordshire to administer an oath of loyalty to the men of Herefordshire not present at Parliament, and bring a list of their names on the quinzaine of Easter. The form of oath to state that they shall keep the peace, and shall with all their might oppose any who do the contrary, that they shall to the end of this parliament side with the five following lords, to wit Thomas duke of Gloucester; Henry earl of Derby; Richard earl of Arundel and Surrey; Thomas earl of Warwick; and Thomas earl marshal; if any man will do aught against their bodies, and shall maintain them to the death against every man without exception, saving always their allegiance to the king, the prerogative of the crown, the laws and good customs of the realm.

On 5 May 1388 Simon de Burley was among the lords convicted by Parliament. Among his forfeited properties was Lyonshall Castle. Baron Devereux was granted the return of the castle, which had been his family's caput and alienated 87 years earlier, and Walter Devereux also received his inheritance rights to the castle as well.

On 10 November 1388 Walter Devereux witnessed John de Cornewaile of Kinlet's grant of warranty for life to Cornewaile's mother of two thirds of the manor of Ashton, Herefordshire, if she should outlive his father, Sir Brian. On 28 June 1390 he was place on a commission of Oyer and terminer in addition to his role as Justice of the Peace for Herefordshire. On 15 July Devereux was on the commission conducting the inquiry post-mortem of John Hastings, 3rd Earl of Pembroke, who had died before coming of age. He was directed to inquire what lands had been held in dower at the death of the earl's widowed mother, Anne Manny, on 3 April 1384, and the widow of Aymer de Valence, 2nd Earl of Pembroke, Marie de St Pol, on her death 16 March 1377. On 27 October 1391 there were adjustments to the rent of the lordship of Bergevenny based on his findings.

On 8 February 1391 Devereux conducted an inquiry into the alienation of the manor of Eaton Tregoes, Herefordshire. On 20 January John and Julian Kirby of La Verne sold for 100L Kimbolton manor, Huntingdonshire; and 2 carucates of land, 12 acres of meadow, and 13 shillings of rent in Laysters, Weston, Mappenore, Leominster, and Aston in Herefordshire to Walter Devereux. A writ was issued in Herefordshire on 17 February 1392 for Thomas, son of Llewelyn le Taillour, for not appearing to answer Walter Devereux regarding a debt of 40L. On 1 March 1392 Devereux was assigned to raise troops in Hertfordshire to resist an invasion in case of war after the expiration of the current truce.

On 27 September 1393 Devereux was mandated to suppress the Lollards in Herefordshire. Specifically cited was Walter Brut and other sons of iniquity who obstinately held, affirmed and preached secretly and openly in various places in the diocese of Hereford certain articles and conclusions notoriously repugnant to sound doctrine, definitively condemned by Holy Church, some as heresies, others as errors.

On 18 June 1394 Walter Devereux was again placed on a commission of Oyer and Terminer for Herefordshire. On 7 August he was granted clause volumus (protection) for one half year while accompanying Richard II to Ireland, and on 28 September nominated Roger Wigmore and Thomas Oldcastle as his attorneys in his absence. Devereux was probably serving in the retinue of Thomas of Woodstock who accompanied the king. The army landed and marched towards Kilkenny undergoing harassment by Irish forces the entire way. After suffering heavy losses, Richard II agreed to negotiate, and brought the army to Dublin by December. The king abruptly returned to England to deal with the Lollard threat, and left part of the army behind under the nominal leadership of the under-age, Roger Mortimer, 4th Earl of March.

On 4 May 1397 Walter and Agnes Devereux paid 13s 4d for the inspection and confirmation of Agnes right as heir for the Crophul charter of 12 May 1327 involving Bonington and Sutton in Nottinghamshire. Shortly after this Richard II begins to move against the prior Lords Appellant. Thomas of Woodstock is captured and sent to Calais, and Sir Thomas Mortimer flees the country to avoid a treason charge. On 27 July Walter Devereux is appointed to a commission of Oyer and terminer in Herefordshire in addition to his duties as Justice of the Peace. On 17 September Thomas of Woodstock was murdered, and Devereux joined the retinue of Henry Bolingbroke, husband of the last Bohun heir, Mary.

Following the death of John Devereux, 2nd Baron of Devereux, on 13 November 1396 his sister Joan Devereux inherited the barony. She married Walter fitzWalter in 1397, and shortly after Walter Devereux was appointed Lieutenant of the Lord FitzWalter's manors in Herefordshire.

During 1398, Henry Bolingbroke was accused of treason by Thomas de Mowbray, and the two prepared to meet in a duel of honor. Richard II stopped the duel, and instead banished them both from the kingdom. Following the death of Bolingbroke's father, John of Gaunt, on 3 February 1399, Richard II revoked the patents allowing Henry Bolingbroke to inherit his estates by proxy on 18 March. Richard II left for Ireland in late May, and Bolingbroke landed at Ravenspurn, Yorkshire, raising a rebellion. Although, placed on a commission of Oyer and terminer on 2 March for Herefordshire, Walter Devereux came out in support of the rebels. When Richard II returned and landed in Wales on 24 July, Devereux was probably among the rebel forces that eventually captured the king at Flint Castle. Following Richard II's abdication, Bolingbroke was crowned Henry IV on 13 October 1399. Walter Devereux was appointed to a Commission of array in Herefordshire on 18 December 1399. On 6 January 1400 Henry IV did not show up for the Epiphany feast being forewarned of a plot, and the conspirators scattered only to be captured, killed, and attainted over the next 2 weeks.

In mid-August 1400 Henry IV led an army into Scotland to suppress raiding, and Walter Devereux served as a captain in this expedition, It ended after 2 weeks without accomplishing much, and on 16 September the Glyndŵr Rising broke out in Wales. Henry IV diverted his returning army including Devereux to Wales, but they were unable to come to grips with Owain Glyndŵr.

Walter Devereux represented Herefordshire in Parliament on 20 January 1401. On 29 April he was placed on a commission to arrest John fitzPieres and Maurice ap Meweryk. On 16 May Devereux was appointed Sheriff of Herefordshire, appointed Justice of the Peace for Herefordshire, and tasked with suppressing lawlessness in South Wales, Bergeveny, Herefordshire, and the March of Wales. As the insurrection spread through the marches, Devereux was assigned on 26 August to inquire into the murder of Thomas Stannesbache of Bromyard, and the wounding of William Ranves at Bromyard. On 11 May 1402 Walter Devereux was appointed to make a proclamation of Henry IV's intention to govern well in Herefordshire. Shortly after he set out with Sir Edmund Mortimer to fight the rebels.

== Death ==
The English met the Welsh at the Battle of Pilleth on 22 June 1402. (Note: The inscription on his daughter, Elizabeth's tomb is reported to be: Here lieth the bodies of Sir John Milborne and Elizabeth his wife, daughter of the most honourable knight of England, Sir Walter Devereux, who was slain at the great battle of Pilleth) During the battle, Walter Devereux was mortally wounded, and died 1 month later on 25 July 1402.

Walter Devereux is believed to have been buried in Weobley Church. Provided is an excerpt from the Journal of the British Archeological Association on this subject: The two monuments on the north and south sides of the chancel are described by Silas Taylor in 1665. Speaking of the one on the north side, he says, “near him, on the wall, hangs a wooden shield with the arms of Devereux. Over against it on the south side, another shield hangs up with a cross engrailed between four spear-heads. I could not discern the colours... A little lower, near the remains of the quire are the effigies of a man in close armour, and a woman”... I am disposed to think that the single figure represents Sir W. Devereux, who died in 1402, and the two figures represent John Marbury and Agnes his wife. I think so partly because Silas Taylor says the Devereux shield hung on the north side and the Marbury shield on the south. (Note: It has been suggested that the Devereux buried here is Walter Devereux's son and heir, Walter who died in 1420. They base this on the appearance of the armor being consistent with that worn in the 1420s, and the Royal Commission on Historical Monuments indicated a date c. 1430. The counter-argument is that the monument was raised after his death at the time of the death of his widow, Agnes Crophull, in 1437.)

== Marriage ==
Walter Devereux was first contracted in marriage to Margaret Seys. He was granted an annulment of this marriage in January 1372, probably to clear the way for a more advantageous match with Agnes Crophull. (Note: Walter Devereux's sister, Anne, married Rosser Vaughan of Lechryd, who according to some pedigrees was the son of a Walter Seys.)

He married Agnes Crophull (27 March 1371-9 February 1436) in October 1382. She was the daughter of Sir Thomas Crophull, and granddaughter and heiress of Sir John Crophull and his wife Margery de Verdun, and her cousin.

On 25 October 1382 Walter Devereux, his father (Sir Walter Devereux), Sir John Devereux, and Sir John de Burley were placed under a recognizance of 400L to Sir John Crophul. On 4 November 1282 John Crophul was granted license following the payment of 20 marks to enfeoff Walter and Agnes Devereux in the manor of Newbold Verdon in Leicestershire. Following John Crophul's death on 3 July 1383, Agnes (age 12) was identified as Walter Devereux's wife. Wardship of Agnes had been assigned to Roger Crophul. On 21 August 1383 Roger Crophul and Thomas Melton granted to Walter Devereux the keeping of all the lands of the late John Crophul except the manors of Hemington, Braunstone, and Bonington until the lawful age of his wife. Joan, widow of John Crophul's son Thomas, was assigned Market Rasen as her dower on 20 September 1383. After the widow's death and Agnes’ coming of age on 27 September 1385, Walter Devereux took possession of the remaining Crophul lands by right of marriage. These included Weobley manor (Herefordshire); Sutton Bonington manor and lands at Arnold (Nottinghamshire); the manors of Navenby, Cotesbach, Braunstone, and Hemington (Leicestershire); and an estate at Market Rasen (Lincolnshire). Weobley would become his principal residence.

They had children: (Note: Burke's Peerage, 106th edition, indicates a possible daughter, Joan, that married Thomas Swynford, but she may have been the sister of Walter Devereux (died 1402). The Peerage also indicates possibly 2 additional sons: Stephen and Roger.) (Note: His three elder sons (Walter, Richard, and John) are all reported to have fought at the Battle of Agincourt in 1415. Sir John Devereux was reported to have been indented for 250 men-at-arms and 250 archers.)

- Sir Walter Devereux his heir (1387),
- Sir Richard Devereux (c. 1389) ),
- Sir John Devereux (c. 1391),
- Thomas Devereux (c. 1393),
- Margaret Devereux (c. 1396)
- Elizabeth Devereux (c. 1401). (Note: Burke's Peerage, 106th Edition, records her as being his grand-daughter, but the description on her tomb described in the note above records her as a daughter)

Agnes survived her husband and was the godmother of Humphrey, earl of Stafford on 15 August 1402. She married a second time to Sir John Parr of Kendal about 1403. John Parr died about September 1407, and his heir was a son Thomas (aged 2). (Note: In 1431 there was a license for John Merbury, Esquire, and Agnes, his wife, to surrender the one third of a fourth part of the Manor of Kirkby Kendal which they held in chief as her dower of the heritage of Thomas de Parr, esquire, son and heir of John de Parr, sometime her husband.) By their son, Thomas, John Parr and Agnes were ancestors of the sixth queen consort of King Henry VIII, Catherine Parr.

Agnes Crophull married a 3rd time to John Merbury of Lyonshall (died 3 February 1438) in 1416. In 1424 the land concessions made by Walter Devereux's grandfather, William Devereux of Bodenham, to John Devereux, 1st Baron Devereux, ended. Agnes Crophull regained the rights to lands that included a quarter of the manor and the advowson of Bishoptown (Bishopstone); Whitchurch Maund manor; and the lands in Whitchurch Maund and Marsh Maund held from the Bishop of Hereford for knight service. (Note: 1409, May 11, Inquiry post-mortem of Baroness Joan (Devereux) fitzWalter. 3) of the Bishop of Hereford by knight service: a quarter of the manor and the advowson of Bishoptown; and Whitechurch Maund manor, and the lands in Whitechurch Maund and Marsh Maund granted to her and her descendants by “concession of William Devereux, deceased” for a term of 70 years.) By 1428 John Merbury is indicated as holding one share of Lyonshall previously held by Lord Fitzwalter.

When Agnes Crophull died on 9 February 1436, her heir was Walter Devereux, grandson of her first husband through their son, Walter Devereux (died 1420). Lyonshall passed to this grandson from her, and also by right of his wife, Elizabeth Merbury, who was the daughter of Agnes Crophull's third husband, John Merbury, by a previous marriage. Agnes was buried at Weobley as described above.

== Biographical References ==
- Brydges, Sir Egerton. Collins's Peerage of England; Genealogical, Biographical, and Historical. Greatly Augmented, and Continued to the Present Time. (London: F.C. and J. Rivington, Otridge and Son; J. Nichols and Co.; T. Payne, Wilkie and Robinson; J. Walker, Clarke and Sons; W. Lowndes, R. Lea, J. Cuthell, Longman, Hurst, Rees, Orme, and Co.; White, Cochrane, and Co.; C. Law, Cadell and Davies; J. Booth, Crosby and Co.; J. Murray, J. Mawman, J. Booker, R. Scholey, J. Hatchard, R. Baldwin, Craddock and Joy; J. Fauldner, Gale, Curtis and Co.; Johnson and Co.; and G. Robinson, 1812). Volume VI, pages 1 to 22, Devereux, Viscount Hereford
- Duncumb, John. Collections Towards the History and Antiquities of the County of Hereford. (Hereford: E.G. Wright, 1812). Part I of Volume II, page 37 and 49, Broxash Hundred
- , accessed 4 November 2013, The History of Parliament Online; Sir Walter Devereux (d. 1402), of Weobley, Herefs.
- Mosley, Charles (editor). Burke's Peerage & Baronetage, 106th Edition. Chicago: Fitzroy Dearborn Publishers, 1999. Page 1378
- Robinson, Charles J. A History of the Castles of Herefordshire and their Lords. (Woonton: Logaston Press, 2002). pages 125 to 129, Lyonshall Castle
