= Jonathan Corwin =

Judge of the Salem witch trials (1640–1718)

- Born: November 14, 1640; Salem, Massachusetts
- Died: June 9, 1718 (aged 77)
- Occupations: Merchant, politician, magistrate
- Spouse: Elizabeth Gibbs
- Children: 10
- Parent(s): George Corwin and Elizabeth Herbert

Jonathan Corwin (also Curwin, Curwen or Corwen, November 14, 1640 – June 9, 1718) was a New England merchant, politician, and magistrate. He is best known as one of the judges involved in the Salem witch trials of 1692, although his later work also included service as an associate justice of the Massachusetts Superior Court of Judicature, the highest court of the Province of Massachusetts Bay.

== Life ==
Jonathan Corwin was born on November 14, 1640, in Salem, a leading port town of the Massachusetts Bay Colony, one of five children born to George and Elizabeth (Herbert) Corwin. His father had arrived in Salem in 1638 and his mother was the daughter of Northampton mayor John Herbert. His father was a wealthy merchant and shipbuilder in Salem, and Jonathan continued in the mercantile trade. He married Elizabeth Gibbs (née Sheaf), widow of Robert Gibbs, in 1675 and had ten children.

Corwin was also involved in public affairs. He was twice elected to the colonial assembly, in 1682 and in 1689, and he was a stalwart supporter of the old regime when the Dominion of New England was established in 1686. He was also an active magistrate of the local courts, hearing cases dealing with petty crimes and minor charges such as drunkenness and burglary.

== Salem witch trials ==
When reports of witchcraft began circulating in Essex County, Corwin was one of the magistrates called on to make preliminary inquiries into the reports. He and John Hathorne, another local magistrate, held hearings in early March 1692 in which testimony was gathered from Tituba, Sarah Good, and Sarah Osborne, the first three women accused of being witches. Due to the uncertain constitutionality of the Massachusetts government in 1692 (its charter was vacated in 1684, and it had reformed with the charter following the 1689 Boston revolt that ended Dominion rule of Sir Edmund Andros), there was a reluctance among colonial leaders to establish courts to hear the cases until Sir William Phips arrived in May 1692 with the charter that established the Province of Massachusetts Bay.

By this time a significant number of people had been jailed on accusations of witchcraft in the Salem area. Phips, who was appointed governor of the province, as one of his early acts established a special court of Court of Oyer and Terminer to hear the accumulated cases. Corwin was not initially assigned to the court, but when Nathaniel Saltonstall resigned in protest over the first hanging, Phips assigned Corwin to the panel.

Corwin signed several arrest warrants and transcribed a few of the hearings but scarcity of records from the 1692 events makes it impossible to determine Corwin's overall role in the trials as well as his attitude toward the acceptance in court of spectral evidence, the idea that actions seen in visions could be an indicator of witchcraft. The special court convicted nineteen of witchcraft and sentenced them to the gallows before it was disbanded in October 1692. The provincial court system was set up in January 1693, with the Superior Court of Judicature, the province's high court, hearing the remaining witchcraft cases.

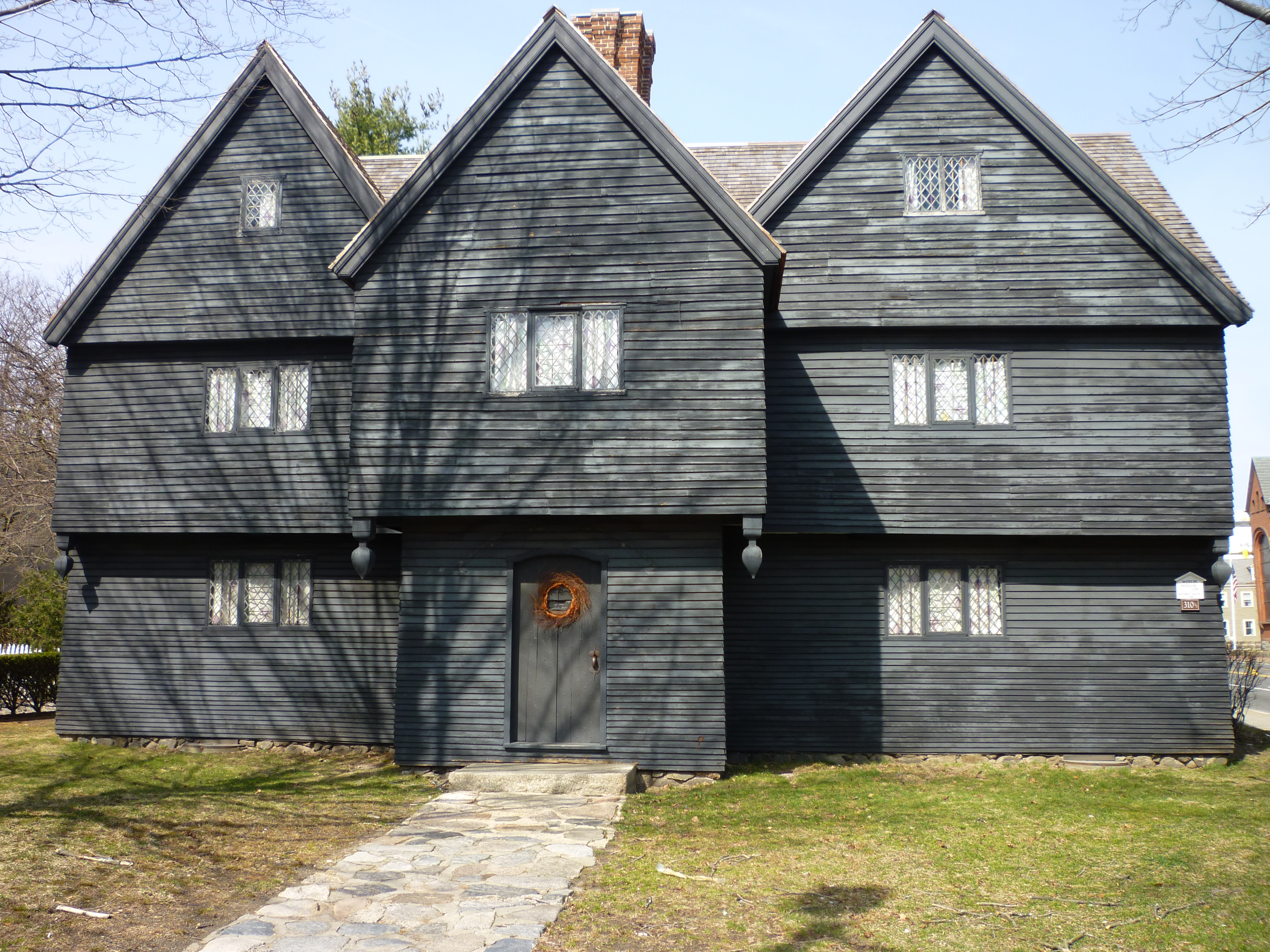
"The Witch House". Former home of Jonathan Corwin. Only surviving structure in Salem, Massachusetts with direct ties to the Salem witch trials

Corwin's own mother-in-law, Margaret Sheaf Thacher (née Webb; born 1625, Boston, to Henry and Dorabell (née Smith) Webb — died February 23, 1694, Boston), was accused of witchcraft by her servant, Mercy Short. Thacher held extensive holdings in Boston, including her home and acreage which was next to Governor William Phips' house. Several years after her first husband's death, she married the Reverend Thomas Thacher. From 1669 to his death in 1678, Thacher served as the founding minister of the Old South Church. Thacher, known as a woman of great piety, was never charged, but Short would spend some time behind bars after confessing to witchcraft herself.

== Later life ==
Corwin was not initially appointed to the Superior Court; he was appointed to the Governor's Council from 1692 to 1714, and served as a judge in the Court of Common Please for Essex County from 1692 to 1708. In that year he was nominated by Governor Joseph Dudley to be an associate justice of the Superior Court following the resignation of John Leverett; he would hold that post until his death in 1717. He is interred in Salem's Broad Street Cemetery.

== Legacy ==
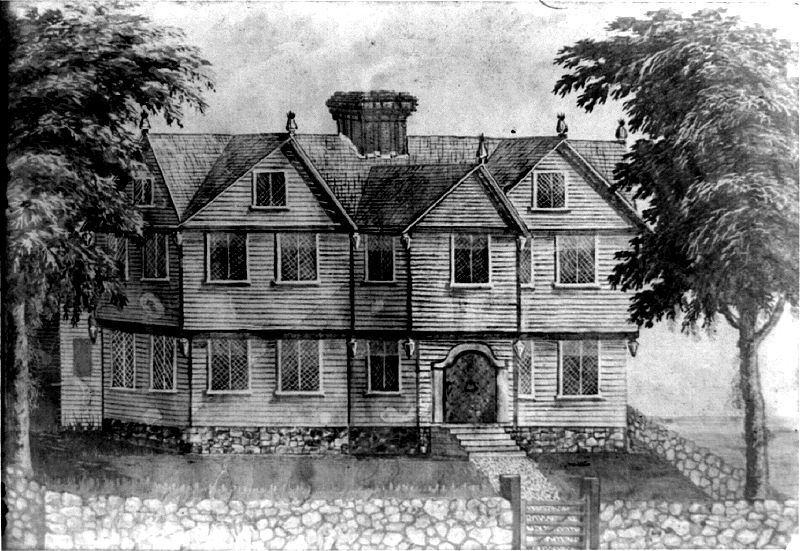
The house of Jonathan Corwin

Corwin's son George (not to be confused with Corwin's nephew, High Sheriff George Corwin) went to Harvard and became minister at the First Church in Salem. Corwin's house is the only remaining structure in Salem with direct ties to the Salem witch trials of 1692. It is now a museum that focuses on seventeenth-century furnishings, architecture, and lifestyle.

== Notes ==
- Corwin, Edward Tanjore. Corwin Genealogy, google.com; accessed October 2, 2015.

Legal offices
Preceded by John Leverett	Associate Justice of the Massachusetts Superior Court of Judicature; 1708-1715	Succeeded by Addington Davenport
