= Chartley Castle Tournament =

Tennis tournament in England (1882–1888)

Defunct tennis tournament
- Founded: 1882; 143 years ago
- Abolished: 1888; 137 years ago
- Location: Stowe-by-Chartley, Staffordshire, England
- Venue: Chartley Castle
- Surface: Grass

The Chartley Castle Tournament was a Victorian era grass court tennis event first staged in August 1882 on the grounds of Chartley Castle, Stowe-by-Chartley, Staffordshire, England. The tournament ran until 1888.

== History ==
The Chartley Castle Tournament was an early Victorian era tennis tournament that was held between 5 and 7 August 1882, on the grounds of the ruins of Chartley Castle (f.1100). The tournament was feature as part of an industrial exhibition staged that year. The men's singles event was won by Mr. H. Carpenter. The tournament also featured a men's doubles event that was won by Mr. H. Carpenter and Mr. R.F. Blakiston. The tournament ran until 1888.

== Finals ==
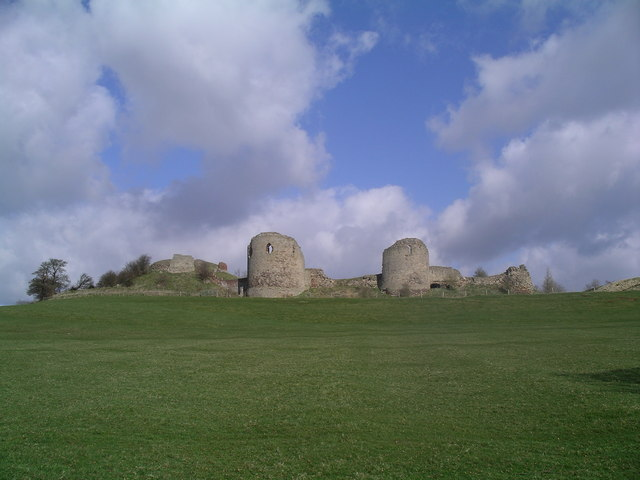
Chartley Castle ruins and grounds in 2007 the location of the Chartley Castle Tournament

Incomplete Roll

=== Men's Singles ===
Year	Winner	Runner-up	Score
1882	(England) Mr. H. Carpenter	?	?

=== Men's Doubles ===
Year	Winner	Runner-up	Score
1882	(England) Mr. H. Carpenter (England) Mr. R.F. Blakiston	?	?
