= Broad Street Cemetery =

Cemetery in Salem, Massachusetts

Broad Street Cemetery is an historic cemetery in Salem, Massachusetts, United States. It was established in 1655 and is the second oldest cemetery in the city. It is located across the street from Pickering House. The cemetery is a popular location for tourists interested in the Salem Witch Trials.

The cemetery was laid out in 1655 and expanded until 1732 when it was first enclosed. In 2020, the city of Salem began work on a preservation plan for the cemetery.

== Notable interments ==
- George Corwin
- Jonathan Corwin
- Benjamin Goodhue
- Frederick W. Lander
- Dudley Leavitt
- Benjamin Pickman Jr.
- Thomas Robie
