= Peter Oliver (loyalist) =

Massachusetts colonial judge (1713–1791)

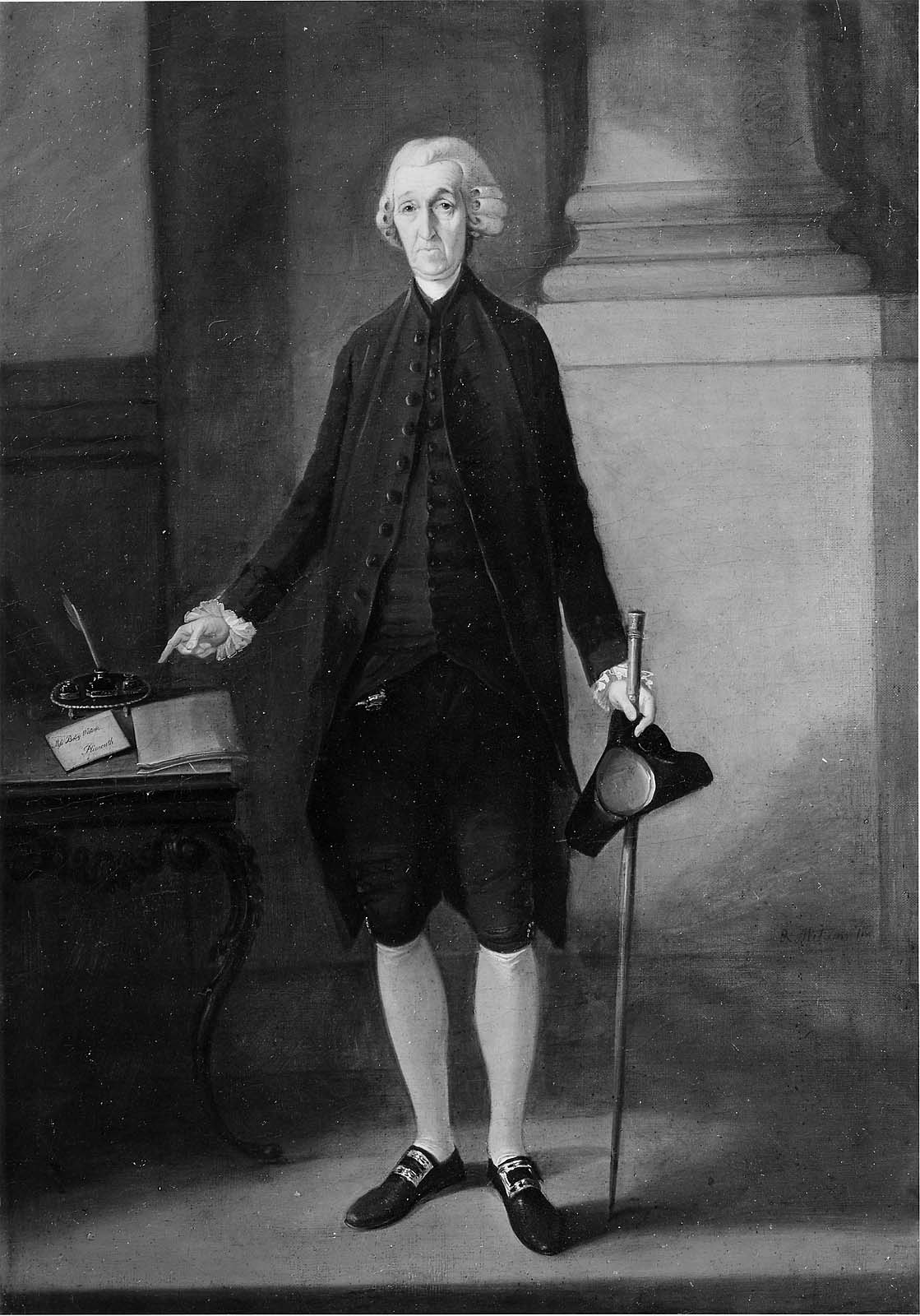
Portrait of Oliver by Richard Wilson

Peter Oliver (March 26, 1713 – October 12, 1791) was Chief Justice of the Superior Court (the highest court) of the Province of Massachusetts Bay from 1772–1775. He was a Loyalist during the American Revolution, and left Massachusetts in 1776, settling in England.

== Early life ==
Peter Oliver was born in Boston on March 26, 1713, to well known parents. He graduated from Harvard College in 1730. He co-ran a Boston importing business with his brother Andrew for several years, although his interests were in science and literature. Oliver bought an iron works in Middleborough, Massachusetts in 1744. This company made household items made of cast-iron as well as cannonballs. With the profits from this company Oliver built Oliver Hall, described as one of the most elegant residences in all of colonial New England.

== Court career ==
Oliver was appointed Justice of the Peace in 1744, and a justice of the Court of Common Pleas in 1747. He was named a justice of the Massachusetts Superior Court of Judicature in 1756. Oliver supported the idea that colonists should be taxed and more effort should be put into preventing smuggling to pay for the French and Indian War.

Originally starting in 1765, the Sons of Liberty used threats and violence as a tool to manipulate the actions of Peter Oliver and his brother Andrew. Peter Oliver was forced to do things such as refusing to sit in court. Oliver was a strong supporter of the Stamp Act, which caused him to be harassed even further.

Oliver was one of three judges during the trials held after the Boston Massacre. Thomas Hutchinson was pleased with the work that Peter Oliver did, and made him chief justice of the Superior Court in 1772. Oliver complained often about how low his salary was as chief justice. The British proposed a plan to raise the justice's salary, paid for by the crown. All of the justices declined this offer except for Oliver. He was impeached in 1774 because of the public outrage against him for doing so. In January, 1776, Oliver, who believed absolutely that the Revolution, which he consistently referred to as the "Rebellion," was illegal and destined to fail, wrote a letter to Massachusetts troops entitled "An Address to the Soldiers of Massachusetts Bay who are now in Arms against the Laws of their Country." Oliver essentially argues that the Rebellion is illegal and destined to fail and that the Massachusetts troops have been lied to by their officers about the potential for success against Great Britain, which he characterizes as the "mildest government to live under."

Oliver was on the 1773 King's Commission instituted to examine the burning of HMS Gaspee in June 1772 by Rhode Islanders.

== Later life ==
Oliver departed from the colonies when the British evacuated troops and Loyalists from Boston in March 1776. He was named in the Massachusetts Banishment Act of 1778. Oliver sailed first to Nova Scotia and later to England and lived there until his death on October 12, 1791. In 1781, the year in which Lord Cornwallis surrendered at Yorktown, thereby effectively ending the military struggle in the Colonies, Oliver wrote a bitter denunciation of the Revolution, targeting those who inflamed the populace against the British, entitled "Origin & Progress of the American Rebellion," which is important because Oliver articulates the views of many Loyalists, especially those who were born in the Colonies and lost everything when they fled to Great Britain. Oliver puts most of the blame on men like Samuel Adams, who, in Oliver's view, instigated an illegal rebellion primarily for economic reasons.

Oliver's remains were scattered inside St Phillip's Cathedral, Birmingham, where there is a memorial plaque situated in the nave.

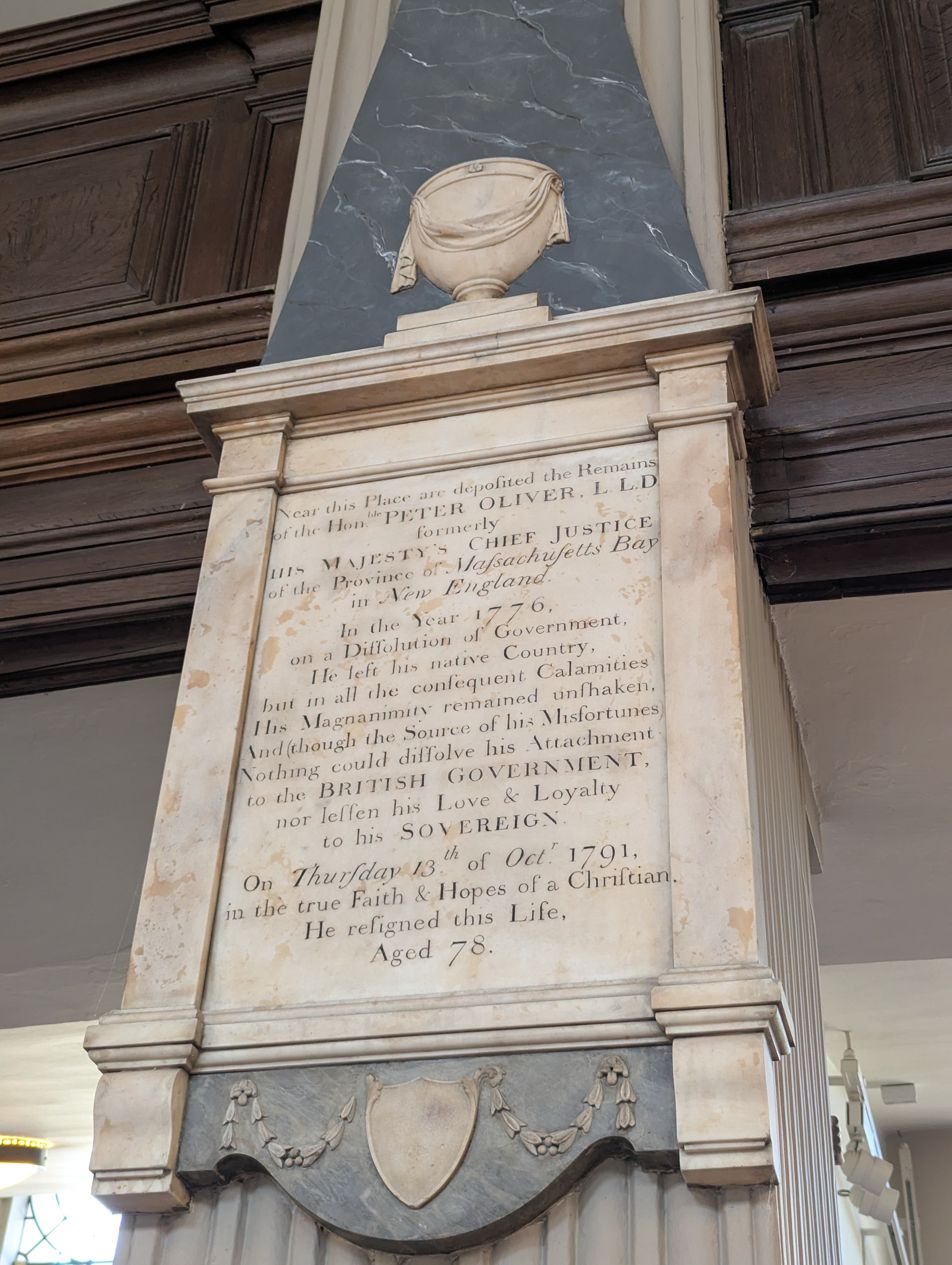
Memorial in Birmingham Cathedral for Peter Oliver, former Chief Justice of Massachusetts

== Literary Works ==
- Oliver, Peter. Scripture Lexicon: Or a Dictionary of Above Three Thousand Proper Names. Birmingham: Piercy and Jones, and J. Johnson, 1784.
- Oliver, Peter. Scripture Lexicon: Or a Dictionary of Above Three Thousand Proper Names. 4th ed. London: for F. and C. Rivington, 1779.

Legal offices
Preceded by Richard Saltonstall	Associate Justice of the Massachusetts Superior Court of Judicature; 1752–1769	Succeeded by William Cushing
Preceded by Thomas Hutchinson	Chief Justice of the Massachusetts Superior Court of Judicature; 1769–1775	Vacant Title next held by William Cushing as Chief Justice of the Massachusetts Supreme Judicial Court
