= Thomas Robie =

American physician (1689–1729)

- Born: March 20, 1689; Boston, Massachusetts
- Died: August 28, 1729 (aged 40); Salem, Massachusetts
- Resting place: Broad Street Cemetery, Salem
- Education: A.B., M.A.
- Alma mater: Harvard College
- Spouse: Mehitable Sewall
- Children: Elizabeth, Thomas
- Parents: William Robie (father); Elizabeth Greenough (mother)

Thomas Robie (March 20, 1689 – August 28, 1729) was a scientist and physician of the British colonies in America. His scientific interests were primarily in meteorology, astronomy, and medicine.

== Biography ==
He was born in Boston, Massachusetts, the son of William and Elizabeth Robie. After graduating from Harvard College with an A.B. in 1708, he taught at a school in Watertown, Massachusetts for about half a year before returning to Boston. Robie published the first of a series of annual almanacs in 1709, which would contain his meteorological observations and studies of the Solar System. He continued his studies at Harvard, and was awarded a Masters of Arts in 1711. In 1712 he was voted a "Library-Keeper" and scholar at Harvard during the period 1712 to 1713.

After seriously considering a career as a Minister, he became a tutor of mathematics and natural philosophy at Harvard in 1913. Among the students he mentored were Thomas Clap, Charles Chauncy, and Isaac Greenwood. He worked to overhaul the Harvard curricula of both science and math, replacing Aristotelianism with the then-recent works of mathematics and physics published by Isaac Newton. From 1715 until 1722 Robie maintained a record of the meteorological conditions at Cambridge. He sought explanations for various weather and climate phenomenon, including Summer heat and the causes of lightning and hail. However, he was much more interested in astronomy.

For his astronomical observations, Robie was supplied with an eight-foot long telescope and other astronomical instruments by Harvard College. He published his observations of an aurora observed on the night of December 11, 1719, which was likely the first scientific pamphlet by an American to be published in America. Robie made a number of observations of the satellites of Jupiter, and he used these observations to deduce the longitude of Harvard. In 1722, Robie prepared to observe an annular solar eclipse with the aid of a newly acquired 24-foot long telescope supplied to the college by Thomas Hollins. Robie published an article about the pending eclipse that appeared in two Boston newspapers titled, "For the Entertainment of the Country and the Promoting of Knowledge". Unfortunately the sky clouded over so he was unable to directly observe the primary eclipse, although he was able to gather notes from observers that allowed him to verify the path.

On February 5 of 1723, Robie resigned his post as tutor at Harvard and moved to Salem where he began the practice of medicine. The likely reason for this move was his marriage to Mehitable Sewall of Salem, daughter of Stephen Sewall. Robie's comprehensive knowledge of medicine was apparently self-taught at Harvard, as the colonies had no Medical colleges at the time and he lacked the finances to study abroad. He was known to have practiced medicine in Cambridge prior to his resignation from Harvard. After his relocation, medicine became his primary practice.

During an outbreak of smallpox in Boston in 1722, Robie aided in the administration of the new treatment of inoculation under the guidance of Boston Doctor Zabdiel Boylston. Due to fervent and bitter opposition, the inoculations had to be performed in isolation on Spectacle Island. On May 11 or 12, Robie administered the treatment to eleven patients out of a total of 280, and on the 17th he followed the patients to the hospital for their caretaking. The treatment was considered a success as the 2.1% mortality rate from the inoculation was lower than the 14.9% in the general population of smallpox patients.

On October 29, 1723, Robie used a nine-foot telescope to observe the transit of the planet Mercury across the face of the Sun. He wanted to see if he could detect an atmosphere, and he concluded, incorrectly, that the planet indeed had one. Thereafter there is no record of further astronomical observations, although he intended to continue. On April 15, 1725, he was elected a Fellow of the Royal Society, with whom he had communicated regularly during his career. Little thereafter is known of his scientific observations.

Robie died prematurely on August 28, 1729. During his career he made no important discoveries and many of his explanations later proved incorrect, but he did contribute to advancing scientific activity in New England. Historian Frederick Kilgour considered him to be the "most famous New Englander in science in his day". Robie's son, named Thomas Robie, became a merchant and married Mary Bradstreet, a woman descended from Governor Simon Bradstreet. Being a staunch loyalist of the British government, at the start of the American Revolution Robie Jr. fled to Halifax with his family. They returned to Salem following the war, and were initially met with much hostility.
