= Charles Lucas (cricketer, born 1843) =

English cricketer and solicitor (1843–1919)

Personal information
- Full name: Charles Frank Lucas
- Born: 25 November 1843; Stowe-by-Chartley, Staffordshire, England
- Died: 27 September 1919 (aged 75); Carshalton, Surrey, England
- Height: 6 ft 0 in (1.83 m)
- Batting: Right-handed
- Relatives: Bunny Lucas (cousin)

Domestic team information
- Years: Team
- 1864–1880: Hampshire

Career statistics
Competition	First-class
Matches	17
Runs scored	650
Batting average	21.66
100s/50s	1/1
Top score	135
Catches/stumpings	10/–
- Source: Cricinfo, 12 February 2010

Charles Frank Lucas (25 November 1843 – 27 September 1919) was an English first-class cricketer and solicitor.

Lucas was born in November 1843 at Stowe-by-Chartley, Staffordshire. His association with cricket in Hampshire began in 1860 and he played for early Hampshire cricket teams. Lucas made his debut in first-class cricket in Hampshire County Cricket Club's inaugural first-class match against Sussex at Southampton in 1864. He scored his only first-class century the two years, making 135 runs against Surrey. Across all levels of cricket in 1866, he scored over 1,000 runs in the season. Lucas played first-class cricket for Hampshire until 1880, making fourteen appearances. In these he scored 502 runs at an average of 20.08. He also made three first-class appearances for the Gentlemen of the South against I Zingari in 1866, and the Players of the South in both 1866 and 1867. For the Gentlemen of the South, he scored 148 runs with a highest score of 48. As a fielder, he was considered one of the best long stops in England.

Outside of cricket, Lucas was a solicitor in Southampton. He died at Carshalton in September 1919. His cousin was the Test cricketer Bunny Lucas.
