= George Corwin =

High Sheriff during Salem Witch trials (1666–1696)

High Sheriff of Essex County, Massachusetts
- In office 1692–1696

Personal details
- Born: 26 February 1666
- Died: 12 April 1696 (aged 30)
- Spouse: Lydia Gedney
- Relations: John Winthrop the Younger (grandfather); Bartholomew Gedney (father-in-law)

George Corwin (February 26, 1666 – April 12, 1696) was the High Sheriff of Essex County, Massachusetts during the Salem witch trials, for which he signed warrants for the arrest and execution of those condemned of witchcraft.

== Early life ==
Corwin was born on February 26, 1666.

He was the grandson of John Winthrop the Younger, the Governor of Connecticut. His wife, Lydia Gedney, was the daughter of Bartholomew Gedney, one of the magistrates involved in the witch trials.

== Involvement in witch trials ==
Corwin was also responsible for choosing the execution site in Salem for hanging the 19 innocent people.

On September 16, 1692, Corwin was ordered by the Court of Oyer and Terminer to preside over the interrogation under torture of Giles Corey, who was pressed to death for refusing to stand trial for witchcraft.

== After the trials ==
Corwin died of a heart attack on April 12, 1696, at the age of 30. He is interred in Salem's Broad Street Cemetery.

After his death, his burial was blocked by a Salem resident Phillip English, who had been accused during the witch trials, and whose property had been seized by Corwin. English put a lien on Corwin's corpse, and delayed its burial until he had been reimbursed for the property he lost to Corwin. He was eventually reimbursed, allowing the burial to proceed.

George Corwin supervised 81 year old Giles Corey's death by torture, September 19, 1692, for refusing to enter a plea. With no plea entered, Corey technically remained innocent, and his property could not be legally seized, but Corwin still attempted to extort money from Corey's heirs: In 1710, Corey's daughter Elizabeth and her husband filed a lawsuit seeking damages from Corwin's estate. Her statement to the court read,

"After our father's death the sheriff threatened to seize our father's estate and for fear that of we complied with him and paid him eleven pound six shillings in money."
