= Listed buildings in Stowe-by-Chartley =

Stowe-by-Chartley is a civil parish in the Borough of Stafford, Staffordshire, England. It contains eight listed buildings that are recorded in the National Heritage List for England. Of these, two are at Grade II*, the middle of the three grades, and the others are at Grade II, the lowest grade. The parish contains the villages of Stowe-by-Chartley and Drointon and the surrounding countryside. Most of the listed buildings are farmhouses and cottages that are timber framed or have timber framed cores. The other listed buildings are a church, a churchyard cross, and the ruins of a castle.

== Key ==
Grade	Criteria
II*	Particularly important buildings of more than special interest
II	Buildings of national importance and special interest

== Buildings ==
Name and location	Photograph	Date	Notes	Grade
St John the Baptist's Church; 52.84375°N 1.99664°W		12th century	The church was restored in 1856, and the north aisle was added in 1875, both by Habershon and Pite. The church is built in local grey sandstone, the vestry roof is slated, and the rest of the roof is tiled. It consists of a nave, a north aisle, a chancel, a northeast vestry, and a west tower. The tower has three stages, angle buttresses, a steeply pointed west doorway, and an embattled parapet, Both north and south doorways are Norman, as are a chancel window and buttress.	II*
Chartley Castle; 52.85386°N 1.98630°W		13th century	The ruined remains of the castle stand on older earthworks, including the foundations of the keep on the motte. The other remains include part of the curtain wall, and two of the original five towers; these are massive, about 12 feet (3.7 m) thick, and with arrow slit openings. The remains are part of a scheduled monument.	II*
Churchyard cross 52.84360°N 1.99655°W	—	Medieval	The cross is in the churchyard of St John the Baptist's Church. It is in stone, and consists of an octagonal base on three steps. The upper parts of the cross are modern.	II
Ingle Nook and Ingle Nook Cottage; 52.84327°N 1.99747°W	—	Late 16th century (probable)	A pair of timber framed cottages with colourwashed brick infill and a thatched roof. There is one storey and attics, and six bays. The windows are casements, and the attic windows are in eyebrow dormers.	II
Manor Farmhouse; 52.85514°N 1.97487°W	—	Late 16th century (probable)	The farmhouse, which has been much altered, has a timber framed core, it has been largely refaced in brick, and has a tile roof. There are two storeys and an attic, an E-shaped plan, and a front of five bays, the outer bays projecting and gabled. In the centre is a two-storey gabled porch, the upper storey jettied. The windows are casements with leaded lights.	II
Grange Farmhouse; 52.84478°N 2.00787°W	—	17th century	The farmhouse, which was extended in the 18th century and later, is partly timber framed and partly in brick, it is partly plastered, and has a tile roof. There are two storeys and an L-shaped plan, and the windows are casements.	II
Old Hall Farmhouse, Drointon; 52.83960°N 1.96563°W	—	17th century (probable)	The farmhouse is partly timber framed and partly in brick, and has a tile roof. There are two storeys and an attic, and three bays. The porch has a hipped roof, and the windows are casements.	II
Keeper's Cottage and outbuildings 52.85896°N 1.96640°W	—	Late 17th century (probable)	The cottage is partly timber framed and partly in brick, and has a tile roof. There is one storey and an attic. The windows are casements with leaded lights; the lower windows have pointed heads. On the front is a gabled porch, and the cottage is flanked by outbuildings.	II
