= Amerton =

Village in Staffordshire, England

Coordinates: 52.846°N 2.008°W

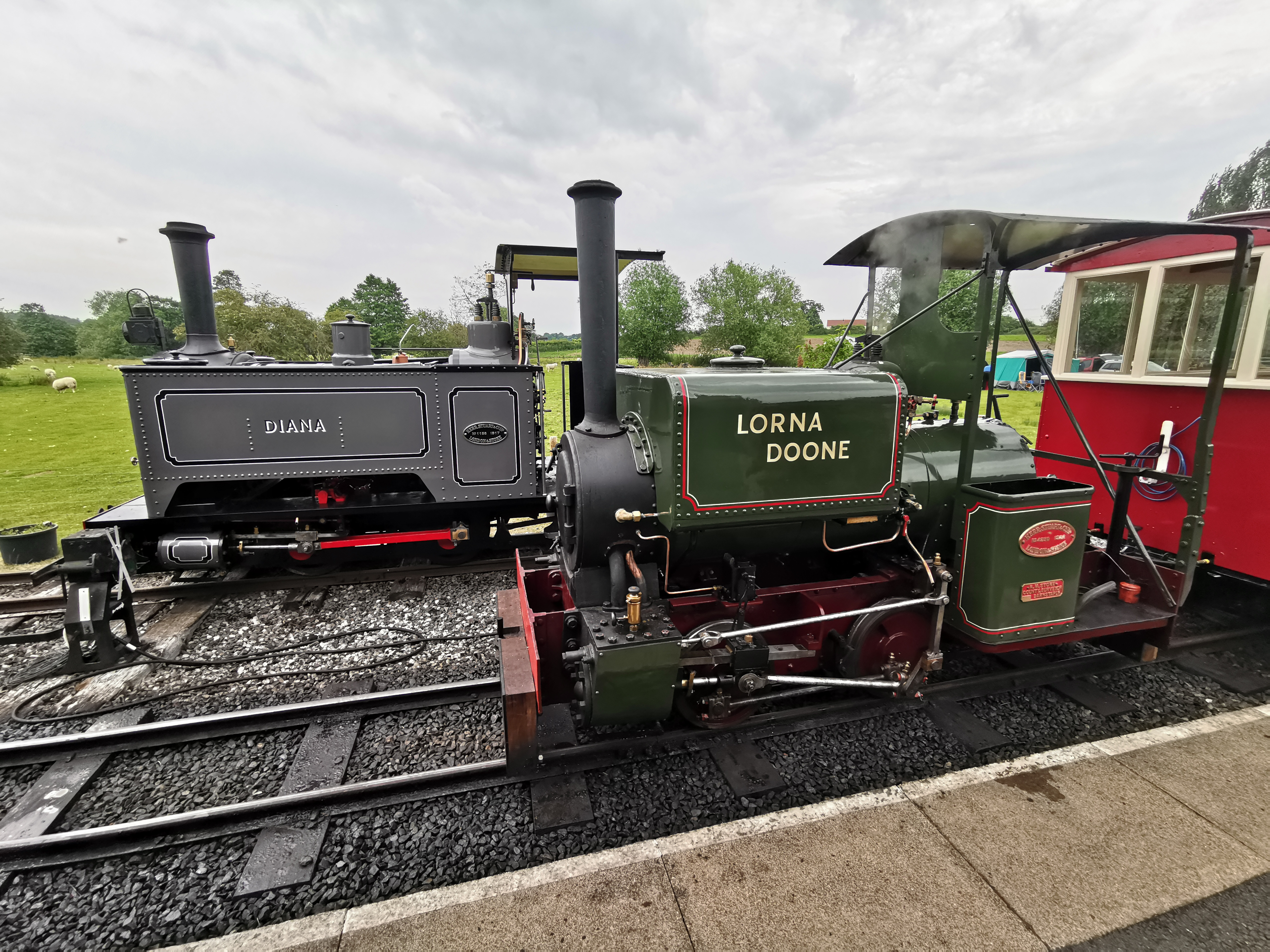
- Amerton Railway based next to Amerton Farm

- Location within Staffordshire
- OS grid reference: SJ9927
- Civil parish: Stowe-by-Chartley
- District: Borough of Stafford
- Shire county: Staffordshire
- Region: West Midlands
- Country: England
- Sovereign state: United Kingdom
- Post town: Stafford
- Postcode district: ST18
- Dialling code: 01889
- Police: Staffordshire
- Fire: Staffordshire
- Ambulance: West Midlands

Amerton is a small village in the Borough of Stafford, Staffordshire, England, situated on the A518 road between Stafford and Uttoxeter. The population details for the 2011 census can be found under Stowe-by-Chartley.

The village is home to Amerton Farm, a popular visitor attraction featuring a farmyard, playbarn, craft centre, and farm shop. Adjacent to Amerton Farm is Amerton Railway, a 2-foot narrow-gauge heritage railway. Operated entirely by a charity and its volunteers, the railway runs for approximately one mile through the Staffordshire countryside and maintains a collection of historic industrial steam and diesel locomotives with a Staffordshire connection.
