= Walter Devereux (died c. 1383) =

Member of the Parliament of England

Walter Devereux of Bodenham
- Born: c. 1339
- Died: c. 1383
- Buried: Bodenham Church
- Spouse: Maud
- Issue: Walter Devereux of Bodenham and Weobley; Ann Devereux
- Father: William Devereux of Bodenham
- Mother: Anne Barre

Sir Walter Devereux of Bodenham was a prominent knight in Herefordshire during the reign of Edward III. He was a member of Parliament, sheriff, and Justice of the Peace for Hereford.

== Ancestry and Childhood ==
Sir Walter Devereux of Bodenham was born about 1339, the son of William Devereux of Bodenham and Anne, daughter of Sir John Barre. His great-grandfather was William Devereux, Baron Devereux of Lyonshall by his first wife, Alice de Grandison.

He was a close ally of his uncle, John Devereux, 1st Baron Devereux of Whitchurch Maund. The Baron was a friend of Edward, the Black Prince, and a member of Richard II's council of regency, and his influence promoted the career of Walter Devereux.

His arms were: Argent a fesse gules, in chief three torteaux.

== Career ==
An oyer and terminer commission was called on 11 Sep 1357 for a complaint by Sir Richard de Acton that Walter Devereux was among a number of individuals that broke into his park at Aily, Somersetshire, hunted and carried away a great part of the deer therein, and then killed livestock worth 10 marks. Another commission was called in 1362 on a complaint by the abbot of Abbotsbury that Walter Devereux was among a number of individuals who tore up stones for metes and bounds in his lands in Tolpuddle (Dorsetshire), felled trees, broke a stank erected to store water for times of drought, carried away fish and timber, trod down and consumed with cattle his crops and grass, and so molested his bondmen there that they cannot hold his bondage.

On coming of age, Walter Devereux, like his father, joined the retinue of Humphrey de Bohun, 7th Earl of Hereford. On 4 October 1363 Devereux was granted the wardship of the lands in Bodenham of Thomas Lucy, (Note: Heir of the late William Lucy (died c1357) who held by knight’s service of the minor heir (Edmund Mortimer, 3rd Earl of March, born 1 February 1352) of the late Roger Mortimer, 2nd Earl of March (died 26 February 1360), previously held in dower by Elizabeth (died 1361), widow of William Lucy, (daughter of Thomas de la Barre)) comprising annual rent of 8 marks and 2 carucates of land, for payment of 8 marks yearly to the exchequer. Following the death of Thomas Lucy on 26 November 1369, Devereux was granted the wardship of his brother and heir, William de Lucy. He testified on 20 November 1374 on William Lucy's coming of age to his holding in Bodenham, Herefordshire.

Devereux was a knight by the time he was nominated on 13 February 1364 as attorney by Brother Thomas de Burley, prior of the Hospital of St. John of Jerusalem in Ireland, preceptor of Dynemor, Carewy and Upledne, who was going to Ireland on the king's service. Also in 1364 the Earl of Hereford granted Bykenhull manor in Oxfordshire to Walter Devereux, and he subsequently traded the manor with the earl for Southam manor in Gloucestershire. These transfers were done without license, and following the earl's death in 1373, the king voided his claim to the manor.

On 15 May 1366 Devereux was assigned to inquire into the complaint of Gilbert and Elizabeth Giffard that the Prior of Saint Oswald's was not maintaining the chapel on Kingshome manor, Gloucestershire, that was held in the king's hand because Elizabeth was underage. He was appointed Justice of the Peace for Gloucestershire on 16 May 1366, and again on 10 July 1368. On 8 Aug 1368 he was appointed to investigate a complaint by Sir John de Burley that Emery le Botiller and others broke into his park at Harsfeld, Gloucestershire, hunted deer, cut down trees, and then carried them away with other goods.

Walter Devereux, as a retainer of the Humphrey de Bohun, 7th Earl of Hereford, served with him in France. In May 1369 he was granted protection and appointed an attorney for 1 year while overseas in France. Devereux was with the forces John of Gaunt led to Calais, and participated in his raids into northern France. He was at the siege of Harfleur in October 1369 that had to be abandoned due to an outbreak of plague and dysentery. He fought at the Battle of the Ford of Blanchetaque on the Somme River, and returned with the army to Calais by mid-November.

Following the death of Humphrey de Bohun on 10 January 1373, Walter Devereux was shown holding 1 fee in Bodenham at his inquiry post-mortem. Devereux was granted the custody of all castles and keeping of all the forests, chases, and parks in Wales and the Marches, which had been held by the said Earl, while they remained in the king's hands. On 16 July Walter Devereux; John ap Rees, and Richard Sergeant were appointed to collect for one year the issues and profits of all castles, lordships and lands in England and the Welsh Marches of the earl of Hereford to be used for the payment of the debts of both Humphrey de Bohun and his father, William de Bohun, earl of Northampton.

He was sometime sheriff of Somerset and Dorset. On 4 October 1375 Walter Devereux was appointed sheriff of Herefordshire. Devereux transferred his affinity to Thomas of Woodstock at this time following his marriage to Humphrey de Bohun's eldest daughter, Eleanor, in 1376.

Following the death of his father, William Devereux, in January 1377, Walter Devereux inherited the family lands. On 3 March 1377 he was granted the wardship of Sir Simon de Burley along with his cousin John Devereux, and John Joyce while they were in the king's hands, and was appointed to investigate who was encroaching on this holding.

On 8 March 1377 he was appointed Justice of the Peace, and assigned on 29 April 1377 to raise troops in Herefordshire to repel an anticipated invasion. On 12 May 1377 Walter Devereux was assigned to make inquisitions by oath of the men of the lordships of Brecombe, Haye, Huntington and Caldecotes in Wales touching all seditions, oppressions, champerties, ambidextries, falsities and deceptions, damages, grievances and excesses perpetrated there; as well in forests, stews, waters, assarts and purprestures as elsewhere; and touching all wards, marriages, reliefs, escheats, lands and other profits and emoluments pertaining to the king which have been concealed, withdrawn or occupied; also to make due restitution of the latter, and to hear and determine the premises at the suit of the king or others; and commission to them to be justices to take hearings in all personal pleas, as well of accounts, errors and attaints, as all others, and to correct what has been wrongly done therein and punish delinquents. Devereux was again appointed on 2 July 1377 as Justice of the Peace for Herefordshire., and on 20 July, following the death of Edward III and ascension of Richard II, he was also among those assigned as keepers of the city of Hereford. They were instructed to stay upon its sage custody and for conservation of the peace therein, with full power to see that all men of the city and suburbs, according to their condition and means, are suitably armed, arrayed, and kept ready to resist the king's enemies, compelling them if need be, by distress or imprisonment.

He obtained a license for an annual fair of three days continuance in Bodenham on 12 July 1378. The days of the fair were to be those of the Assumption (15 August), the day preceding, and the day following. He also was granted a weekly market in Bodenham to occur on Tuesdays. Devereux also represented Herefordshire in the Parliament of October 1378. and April 1379. On 8 Aug 1379 Walter Devereux was instructed to investigate a report that the tax assessors of the king's subsidy in Herefordshire had failed to collect the full amount due, and to insure that any errors are corrected.

On 26 May 1380 Walter Devereux and his liege, Thomas of Woodstock, were appointed Justice of the Peace for Herefordshire. On 22 June 1380 he was granted protection and appointed an attorney for 1 year while overseas in France serving in the company of Thomas of Woodstock, Earl of Buckingham. In July Woodstock led an army across the channel to Calais to bring support to John IV, Duke of Brittany in his resistance to Charles V of France. The army marched east of Paris where it confronted Philip the Bold at Troyes, but the French refused battle and the two armies marched away. On 16 Sep 1380 Charles V died, and the French defense was thrown into disarray. Thomas of Woodstock led a chevauchée westward, and in November laid siege to Nantes. In January 1381 the Duke of Brittany reconciled with the new French King, Charles VI, and Woodstock was forced to abandon the siege due to dysentery and the collapse of his alliance.

By June Devereux was back on the Welsh Marches during the Peasants’ Revolt. He was mandated on 7 July 1381 to issue a proclamation regarding the murder under pretext of royal authority of Simon, Archbishop of Canterbury; Robert de Hales, Prior of the Hospital of St. John of Jerusalem; Chief Justice John de Cavendish; and others by the rebels. He also was appointed to a Commission of array, empowered to forbid unlawful assemblies, and to resist and punish the insurgents. In November 1381 he represented Herefordshire in Parliament, and was appointed Justice of the Peace on 14 December.

He again represented Herefordshire in Parliament in February 1382, Also attending Parliament was his son of the same name, and they both were appointed to a royal commission. He was assigned on 8 February 1382 to arrest William de Solers who had been outlawed for not appearing before the king for disseising John ap William ap Jankin and his wife of Dorstone manor, and on 16 February 1382 to arrest the individuals responsible for disseising John de Walleford of the manor of Brocton.

On 8 March 1382 Walter Devereux was among those appointed Justice of the Peace for Herefordshire, empowered to arrest, imprison and punish rebels, and appointed a commissioner of Oyer and terminer with power to arrest, imprison and punish any who refused to assist him. He attended Parliament again in May, and had his appointment as Justice of the Peace reaffirmed in on 12 August 1382. Devereux represented Herefordshire in the Parliaments of October 1382 and February 1383. On 6 March 1383 Walter Devereux and Richard de Eton of the county of Hereford commitment by mainprise to John Burlev, Richard Burley and Roger Bierd the keeping of the manors of Mauwardyn, Blenleveny and Orleton, previously held by the late Edmund earl of March, and to hold the same until the lawful age of Roger, the earl's son and heir.

== Death ==
Walter Devereux died sometime after March 1383.

Provided is an excerpt from Mansions and Manors of Herefordshire describing his home, and burial in the church of Bodenham Devereux: The manor-house, formerly called “Devereux Court” and now the “Moat,” is situated near the Church, and is a timber mansion of great antiquity. It probably formed the residence of Sir Walter Devereux who was the Sheriff, 50 and 51 Edward III, and whose monument was to be seen in the church forty years ago. Dingley (Hist. from Marble. Part I, ccxxxvi.) gives a sketch of it, from which we gather that it represented a knight in chain-armour with a sleeveless surcoat over the hawberk. The sword is on the right side and attached to a jeweled belt. The hands are crossed above the breast, on which are depicted the arms of Devereux. These are repeated at intervals on the upper plinth, where a French inscription is partially legible. Sir Walter obtained licence for a market and fair at his manor of Bodenham, and probably contributed largely to the re-building of the church, in the windows of which were to be seen the arms of Devereux and the cognizance of Richard II – the white hart lodged – together with the arms of that monarch and those of Delabere, Lucy, and Brydges. All these memorials have now perished; the alabaster slab, on which the effigy of Sir Walter was incised, was broken into fragments at the restoration of the church in 1834.

== Marriage ==
He married a woman named Maud (Note: The 10 Feb 1370 reference indicates Maud holding for life land of the inheritance of John, son of Henry le Frene, and may indicate dower from a first marriage.) and had children:

- Walter Devereux of Bodenham and Weobley (c. 1361)
- Ann Devereux (c. 1363) who married Roger Vaughan of Lechryd.
