= Richard Saltonstall (Massachusetts judge) =

American judge (1703–1756)

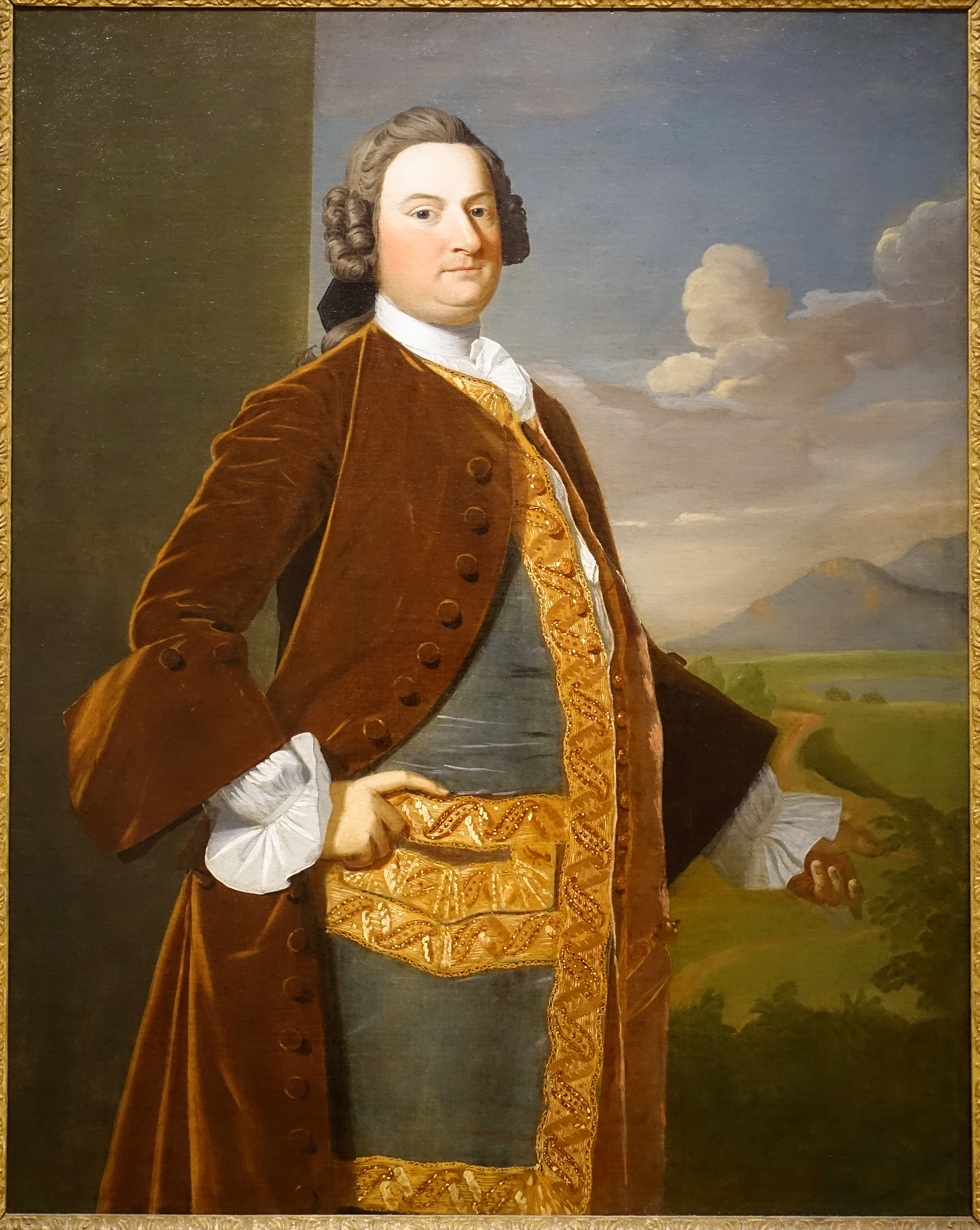
- Portrait of Saltonstall by Robert Feke, c. 1750

Associate Justice of the Massachusetts Superior Court of Judicature
- In office 1736–1756

Personal details
- Born: June 21, 1703 Haverhill, Massachusetts
- Died: October 20, 1756 (aged 53)
- Education: Harvard College (BA)
- Occupation: jurist

Richard Saltonstall (June 21, 1703 – October 20, 1756) was a justice of the Massachusetts Supreme Judicial Court from 1736 until his death in 1756. He was appointed by Governor Jonathan Belcher.

Born in Haverhill, Massachusetts, to Richard and Mehitable (Wainwright) Saltonstall, Richard Saltonstall, graduated from Harvard College in 1722. He was a member of the Council from 1743 to 1745, and was appointed Associate Justice in 1736.

On January 6, 1726, Saltonstall married Abigail Waldron, who died in 1736. On He February 9, 1738, he married Mary Jekyll, who died in 1742. On July 3, 1744, he married Mary Cooke, with whom he had one son, Nathaniel Saltonstall. Mary Cooke died in 1804, at the age of 81.

Political offices
Preceded by Addington Davenport	Justice of the Massachusetts Superior Court of Judicature; 1736–1756	Succeeded by Peter Oliver
