= Walter Devereux, 8th Baron Ferrers of Chartley =

English nobleman

Walter Devereux Baron Ferrers of Chartley
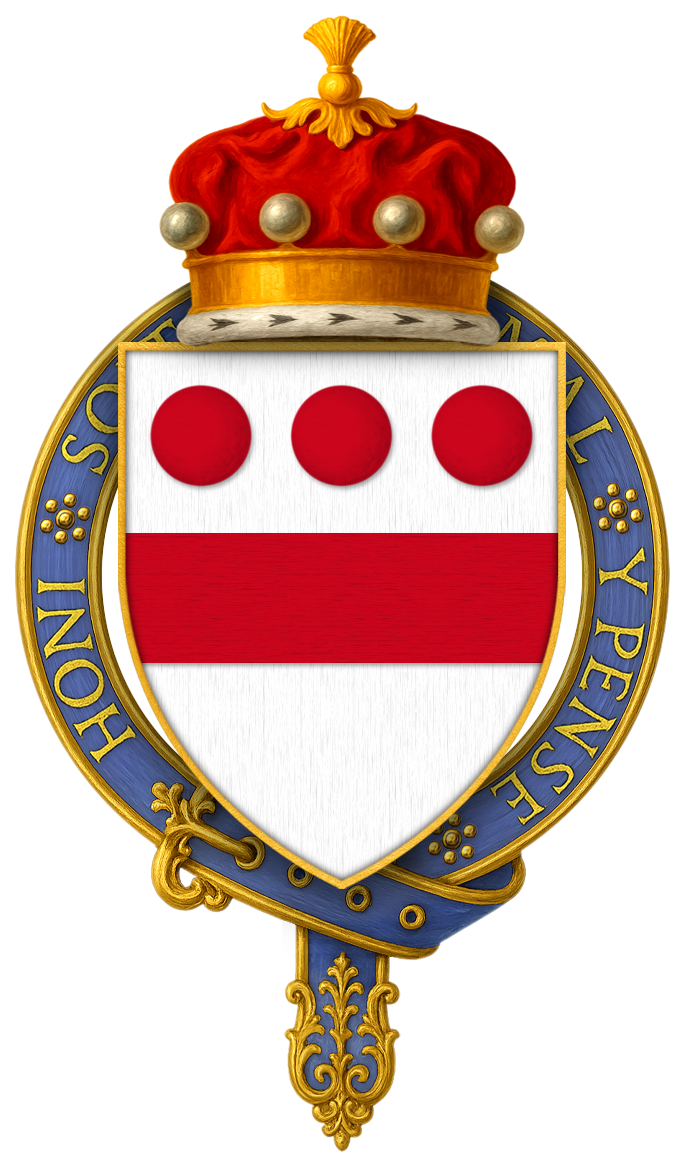
- Born: c. 1432; Weobley, Herefordshire, England
- Died: 22 August 1485 (aged c. 53); Battle of Bosworth, Leicestershire
- Spouses: Anne Ferrers; Johane, widow of Thomas Ilom
- Children: 7, including John Devereux, 9th Baron Ferrers of Chartley
- Parent(s): Sir Walter Devereux; Elizabeth Merbury

Walter Devereux, 8th Baron Ferrers of Chartley (c. 1432 – 22 August 1485) was an English nobleman and a loyal supporter of the House of York during the Wars of the Roses. He was a member of the inner circle of King Edward IV, and died fighting for Edward's younger brother, King Richard III, at the Battle of Bosworth in 1485.

== Origins ==
He was born about 1432 in Weobley, Herefordshire, the son of Sir Walter Devereux (1411–1459), Lord Chancellor of Ireland (from 1449 to 1450), and Elizabeth Merbury, the daughter and heiress of Sir John Merbury, Chief Justice of South Wales by his first wife, Alice Pembridge.

== Marriage and children ==
Walter Devereux married twice:

- Firstly before 25 October 1446, in a childhood marriage he wed Anne Ferrers (1438—9 January 1469), the daughter and heiress of William de Ferrers, 7th Baron Ferrers of Chartley, and thereby became jure uxoris Baron Ferrers of Chartley (in right of his wife) on 26 July 1461. His wife Anne inherited great wealth upon the death of her father. Through the marriage, the Devereux family gained Chartley Castle as well as its barony. By his wife, who predeceased him by seventeen years, he had at least six children including:
  - Sir Robert Devereux of Ferrers (c1455—?), who was appointed a Justice of the Peace for Shropshire on 24 February 1473, and again on 8 Nov 1473.
  - John Devereux, 9th Baron Ferrers of Chartley (1463 - 3 May 1501)
  - Elizabeth Devereux (c1454—1516), wife first of Sir Richard Corbet of Morton Corbet, then of Sir Thomas Leighton of Wattlesborough.
  - Anne Devereux (c1453—after 1475), married as his first wife, Sir Thomas Tyrrell
  - Sir Richard Devereux
  - Sir Thomas Devereux
- Secondly, he married Joan (fl.1522), widow of Thomas Ilom, by whom Walter had no further children. She survived him and remarried thrice: firstly to Thomas Vaughan, secondly to Sir Edward Blount of Sodington, and thirdly to Thomas Poyntz (d.1501) of Alderley, Gloucestershire.

== Career ==
In 1453, Walter and his wife Anne took possession of her father's lands, and Walter received those of his father in 1459. The same year he fought in a skirmish at Ludford under Richard, Duke of York, but then submitted himself to the king's mercy. His lands were ordered confiscated, but he was allowed to redeem them for 500 marks. He served as knight of the shire for Hereford in 1460, then at the start of 1461 he proceeded to London with Edward, Duke of York and participated in the council resolving that Edward should be king. He fought at the Battle of Towton after which he was knighted, and was subsequently named Baron Ferrers, the title previously held by his wife's family, and given many lands forfeited by the supporters of the deposed Henry VI of England.

He fought with the new king, now Edward IV, in the North in November 1462, and over the subsequent decade was named constable or keeper of several castles, including those at Aberystwith, Brecknock, Hay and Huntingdon. He became sheriff of the county of Carnarvon was named Master-Forester of Snowdon Hills in 1470. In 1472, he was nominated a Knight of the Garter, and the next year was appointed as tutor and councillor of Edward, Prince of Wales. He continued to benefit from royal largesse, being granted Wigston, Leicestershire, in 1476, and Cheshunt, Hertfordshire, in 1484.

== Death ==
Walter Devereux supported Richard III of England during his reign, and fought by his side at the Battle of Bosworth (22 August 1485). There, Lord Ferrers commanded in the vanguard under John Howard, Duke of Norfolk, alongside Sir Robert Brackenbury and Thomas Howard, Earl of Surrey. Devereux was slain during the initial fight with the opposing van under John de Vere, 13th Earl of Oxford, fighting next to the young John, Lord Zouche. An in-law, Sir John Ferrers, was also killed at Bosworth. He was attainted after his death on 7 November 1485.

Peerage of England
Preceded by William Ferrers	Baron Ferrers of Chartley; 1462–1485	Succeeded by John Devereux
