= Chartley Castle =

Ruined castle in the United Kingdom

Coordinates: 52.85399°N 1.98659°W

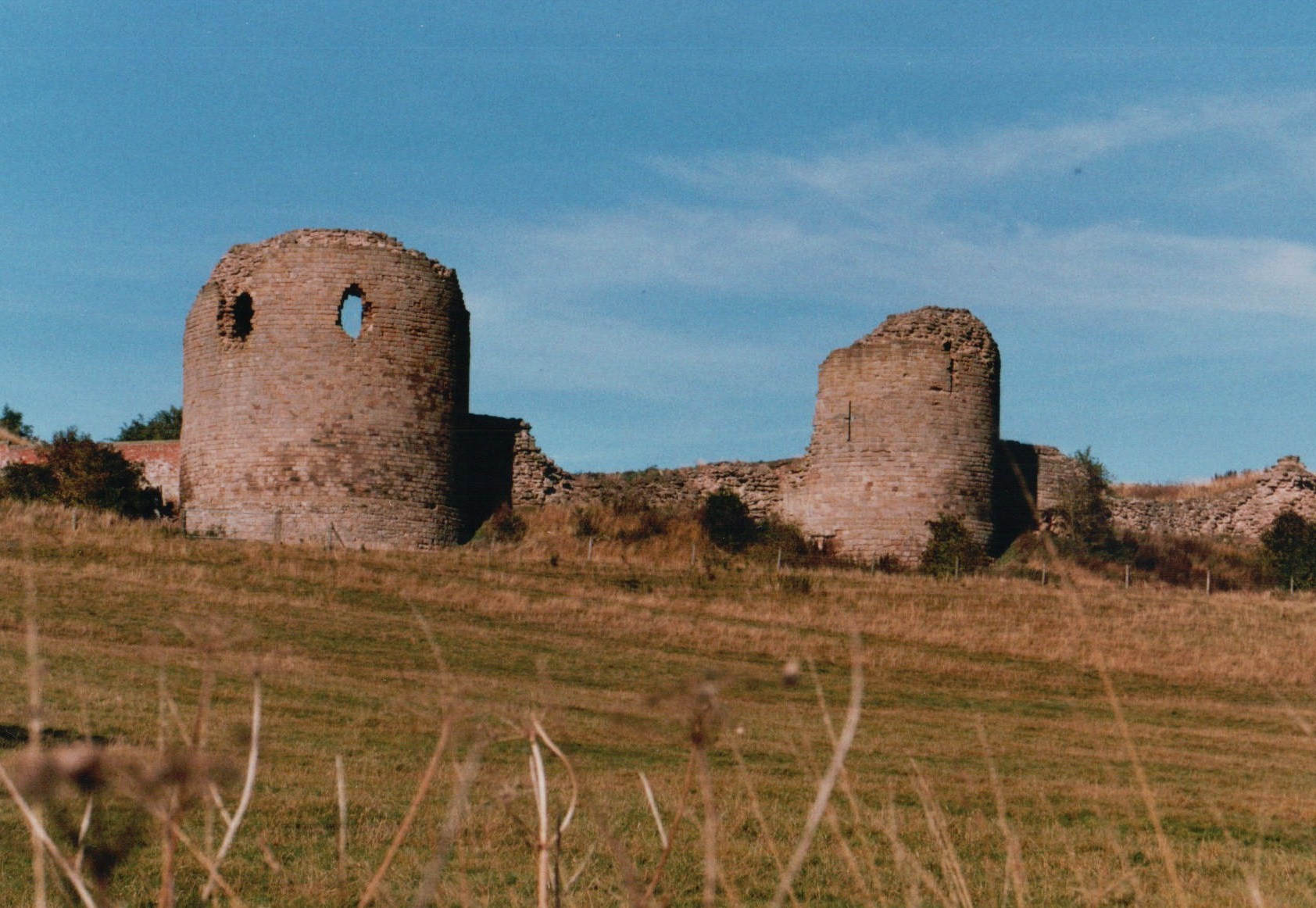
Chartley Castle ruins

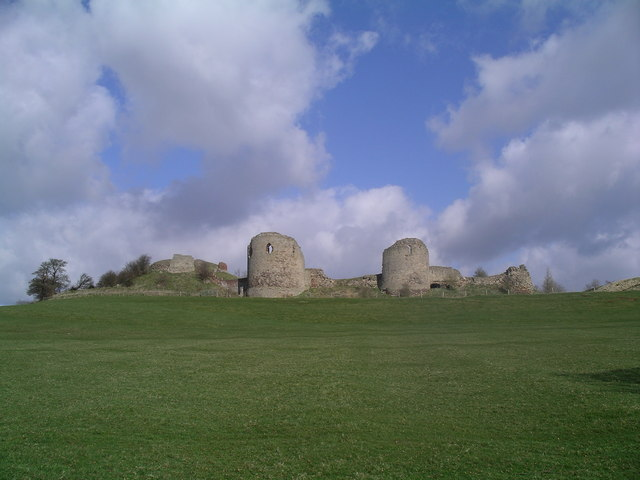
Chartley Castle ruins

Chartley Castle lies in ruins to the north of the village of Stowe-by-Chartley in Staffordshire, between Stafford and Uttoxeter (grid reference SK010285). Mary, Queen of Scots, was imprisoned on the estate in 1585. The remains of the castle and associated earthworks are a Scheduled Monument, the site having been protected since 1925. The castle itself is a Grade II* listed building

== History ==
The motte and bailey castle was built by one of the early Earls of Chester, about 1100, as a safe stop-over for their journeys to places such as Tutbury. It was rebuilt in 1220 by Ranulph de Blondeville, 4th Earl of Chester, who died in 1232. It then passed by marriage to William de Ferrers, 5th Earl of Derby. It remained in the Ferrers family for more than 200 years, and in 1453, passed to Walter Devereux, through his wife Anne de Ferrers, the Ferrers heiress. Through his wife, Walter also became jure uxoris Baron Ferrers of Chartley in 1461, and was killed at the Battle of Bosworth in 1485. The castle was then abandoned as a residence, and Chartley Manor, a moated and battlemented timber mansion, was built nearby. Mary, Queen of Scots was a prisoner in this manor house. It was destroyed by fire in 1781. What is now known as Chartley Manor was in fact known as "Chartley Manor Farm" until the 1980s.

== Description ==
Substantial remains are still present today, including a rare cylindrical keep, a curtain wall flanked by two half-round towers, a twin-towered gatehouse and an angled tower. A survey conducted in the nineteenth century identified five towers ranging from 35 to 41 feet external diameter, and the keep, 50 feet in diameter. One author has noted similarities of the plan to the Château de Montlhéry near Paris, which Ranulph de Blondeville may have been familiar with. M.W. Thompson noted numerous architectural similarities between Chartley, Bolingbroke Castle, Lincolnshire and also Beeston Castle in Cheshire, all thought to have been built under de Blondeville.

== Mary, Queen of Scots at the manor ==
When Chartley Manor belonged to Robert Devereux, 2nd Earl of Essex it became one of the last places of imprisonment of Mary, Queen of Scots. Her jailor Amias Paulet came from Tutbury Castle to view the manor in September 1585 and saw the house was just big enough to accommodate both his and the queen's households, "somewhat straitly." Chartley manor was preferred over alternatives because the house had a deep moat, though the moat was quite narrow in places. The moat also helped security because the queen's laundry could be washed without her maids leaving the house. Paulet wrote that the way the Manor was "found to stand so low and environed with water" was not likely to please Mary (she being sensitive to damp environments).

=== Revealing the Babington plot ===
Paulet prepared to move the queen the twelve miles from Tutbury before Christmas 1585, and decided to avoid going through the busy market town of Uttoxeter. Mary spent almost a year at Chartley. Mary's health improved, and in June she was carried to watch duck-hunting in the ponds around the house.

In August 1586, Francis Walsingham made a plan to arrest Mary and move her from Chartley by having Paulet pretend to take her hunting, while the leading members of her household were arrested and her papers seized. Many of servants would be kept at Chartley and she would be taken to another house. Acting on the Babington Plot, Mary was arrested on 11 August 1586 while out riding and hunting with a crossbow, with her secretaries Claude Nau and Gilbert Curle, Bastian Pagez, her doctor Dominique Bourgoing and others. They were surprised by armed soldiers who took them to Tixall.

Walsingham wrote to Paulet from Windsor Castle on 25 August that Elizabeth ordered that Mary should not leave Tixall. However, on that day, Paulet brought Mary back to Chartley. Claude Nau, Gilbert Curle, and the cipher clerk Jérôme Pasquier were arrested and questioned about Mary's involvement in the Babington Plot. On 21 September 1586 Mary was removed to the strong castle of Fotheringay in Northamptonshire where she was beheaded on 8 February 1587.

== See also ==
- Grade II* listed buildings in Stafford (borough)
- Listed buildings in Stowe-by-Chartley
