= Stowe-by-Chartley =

Village in Staffordshire, England

Coordinates: 52.843°N 1.995°W

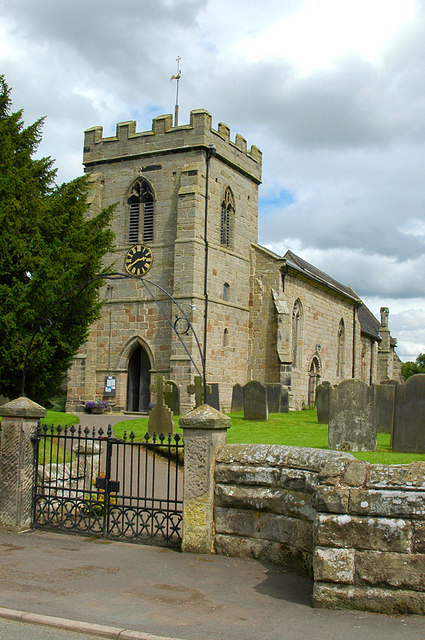
- St. John the Baptist church

- Location within Staffordshire
- Population: 418 {2011}
- OS grid reference: SK0027
- District: Stafford
- Shire county: Staffordshire
- Region: West Midlands
- Country: England
- Sovereign state: United Kingdom
- Post town: Stafford
- Postcode district: ST18
- Dialling code: 01889
- Police: Staffordshire
- Fire: Staffordshire
- Ambulance: West Midlands
- UK Parliament: Stone, Great Wyrley and Penkridge

Stowe-by-Chartley is a village and civil parish in the Borough of Stafford, Staffordshire, England.

According to the parish council, the parish includes Amerton, Chartley, Grindley and Drointon. The village and civil parish of Hixon is to the south, and East Staffordshire district borders the parish to the east.

At St John the Baptist's church in Stowe-by-Chartley is a plaque by Sir Edwin Lutyens to the memory of Billy Congreve VC, DSO, MC (1891–1916) recipient of the Victoria Cross

== Notable people ==
- Charles Lucas (1843 in Stowe-by-Chartley – 1919) an English first-class cricketer who played for Hampshire
- Rupert Evans (actor, born 1976)

== See also ==
- Listed buildings in Stowe-by-Chartley
- Chartley Castle
- Chartley Castle Tournament
- Chartley railway station
