= Walter Devereux (1387–1419) =

Walter Devereux of Bodenham
- Born: Christmas 1387
- Died: 1419 (age 31/32)
- Spouse: Elizabeth Maud Bromwich
- Issue: Walter Devereux of Bodenham and Weobley; William Devereux; Thomas Devereux; Simon Devereux; Isabel Devereux
- Father: Walter Devereux of Bodenham and Weobley
- Mother: Agnes Crophull

Sir Walter Devereux (1387–1419) of Bodenham was a prominent knight of Herefordshire during the reigns of Henry IV and Henry V. He is the ancestor of the Devereux Earls of Essex and Viscounts of Hereford.

== Childhood and Ancestry ==
Devereux was born on Christmas Day 1387, and was 15 years old at the death of his father, Walter Devereux of Weobley. He inherited only part of the lands of his father, and his mother, Agnes Crophull, held the majority of his estates in dower during his lifetime.

His mother, Agnes, would marry three times. Her second marriage was to Sir John Parr of Kendal. They were parents to Sir Thomas Parr (d.1464), great-grandfather of Catherine Parr, queen consort to King Henry VIII.

His arms were: Argent a fesse gules, in chief three torteaux.

== Career ==
Devereux assumed a position in the retinue of Henry IV following the death of his father on 25 July 1402 at the Battle of Pilleth. On 13 December 1402 Sir Edmund Mortimer declared his rebellion against Henry IV, but Devereux stayed loyal to the king. He was probably present at the Battle of Shrewsbury on 21 July 1403, and subsequently was knighted. Devereux was an important supporter of the efforts to suppress the rebellion in Wales as Prince Henry assumed responsibility for the fight. Devereux would be among 14 men below the rank of baron who would be retained for life by Prince Henry (the future Henry V).

In 1406 Welsh raiders damaged Lyonshall Castle in the heart of Devereux territory. Devereux shared a claim on the castle with the family of his distant cousin John Devereux, 1st Baron Devereux. These claims could only be inherited through the male line, and would result in the castle finally passing to his son in the 1430s. When the daughter of John Devereux, Joan 3rd Baroness Devereux and Baroness Fitzwalter, died on 11 May 1409 she still possessed Lyonshall. On 24 May 1409 an order was issued to the escheator and sheriff of Herefordshire to take the castle into the king’s hands, and arrest ‘certain of the king’s lieges’ who had entered and held it with a strong hand to the contempt of the king. This is probably a reference to Devereux trying to assert his claim.

As described in Shakespeare's plays, there is suggestion that when Henry V assumed the throne on 20 March 1413, the new king did not favor the companions of his youth who had supported him in his struggles with the partisans of his father, Henry IV. This loss of favor may have contributed to the shift of the Devereux family into the retinue of the newly reinstated Earl of March, and ultimately into the affinity of the House of York.

On 12 November 1414 John and Agnes Cheverell granted for 200 marks to Agnes Crophul, mother of Devereux, and her heirs 1 messuage, 20 acres of land, 5 acres of meadow, and 7 acres of pasture in Whitchurch maund; the manor and rent of Whitchurch maund; 7 messuages, 1 toft, 243 acres of land, 26 acres of meadow, and 28 acres of wood in Bodenham, which encompassed all the land concessions of Devereux's ancestor, William Devereux of Bodenham, to Baron John Devereux.

Devereux went with Henry V to France along with his brothers, Sir John Devereux and Sir Richard Devereux. He fought at the Siege of Harfleur, and the Battle of Agincourt on 25 October 1415.

On 2 May 1417 Geoffrey Harley, Richard Hull, and John Monnington granted to John Merbury, and Agnes Crophul, his wife and the heirs of their body: Weobley Castle, and the manors of Weobley, Cotesbach, and Newbold Verdon; the manors of Arnold, Treswell, Hyde, Hemington (in Lockington), Sutton Bonington, Leake, Thrumpton, Braunstone, and the manor and vill of Market Rasen; 3 knights’ fees in Weobley, Straddle (in Vowchurch), Cusop, and Little Marcle in Herefordshire, one and a quarter knights’ fees in Bitterly and Blithelow (in Bishop's Castle) in Shropshire; 60 shillings of rent and the view of frankpledge of Skeffington in Leicestershire; the advowsons in Leicestershire of the priory of Grace Dieu; the churches of Braunstone, Skeffington, and Cotesbach; a fourth part of the church of Bosworth, the advowson of Ludlow in Shropshire; and a fourth part of a water mill in Luton and Wheathampstead (Bedfordshire). These lands would all pass together to the Devereux family following the marriage of Walter Devereux’s son to John Merbury’s daughter from a previous marriage.

On 20 January 1418 John Walwyn died holding a moiety of the manors of Wellington and Addesore, and left a widow and three underage daughters who became the wards of Walter Devereux. Walwyn’s widow died in 1419, and the next year the eldest daughter, Elena wife of Richard Monington, proved her full age before the escheator and jurors.

== Death ==
Walter Devereux died in 1419.

== Marriage ==
Walter Devereux married about 1409 to Elizabeth Maud Bromwich, daughter of Sir Thomas Bromwich. They had children:

- Walter Devereux his heir.
- William Devereux (c1412 - after 1433)
- Simon Devereux (c1418 - after 1445)
- Isabella Devereux (c1420), married Rowland Lenthall

== General Reference ==
- Brydges, Sir Egerton. "Collins's Peerage of England; Genealogical, Biographical, and Historical. Greatly Augmented, and Continued to the Present Time." (London: F.C. and J. Rivington, Otridge and Son; J. Nichols and Co.; T. Payne, Wilkie and Robinson; J. Walker, Clarke and Sons; W. Lowndes, R. Lea, J. Cuthell, Longman, Hurst, Rees, Orme, and Co.; White, Cochrane, and Co.; C. Law, Cadell and Davies; J. Booth, Crosby and Co.; J. Murray, J. Mawman, J. Booker, R. Scholey, J. Hatchard, R. Baldwin, Craddock and Joy; J. Fauldner, Gale, Curtis and Co.; Johnson and Co.; and G. Robinson, 1812). Volume VI, pages 1 to 22, Devereux, Viscount Hereford
- Duncumb, John. "Collections Towards the History and Antiquities of the County of Hereford." (Hereford: E.G. Wright, 1812). Part I of Volume II, page 37 and 49, Broxash Hundred
- Mosley, Charles (editor). Burke's Peerage & Baronetage, 106th Edition. Chicago: Fitzroy Dearborn Publishers, 1999. Page 1378
- Robinson, Charles J. "A History of the Castles of Herefordshire and their Lords." (Woonton: Logaston Press, 2002). pages 125 to 129, Lyonshall Castle
