= Walter Devereux (1411–1459) =

Lord Chancellor of Ireland

Walter Devereux of Bodenham and Weobley
- Born: 1411
- Died: 1459 (aged 47–48)
- Spouse: Elizabeth Merbury
- Issue: Walter Devereux, 8th Baron Ferrers of Chartley; Anne Devereux, Countess of Pembroke; Sybil Devereux; Sir John Devereux; Katherine Devereux
- Father: Walter Devereux of Bodenham
- Mother: Elizabeth Bromwich

Sir Walter Devereux (1411 – 22 April 1459) of Bodenham and Weobley was a loyal supporter of Richard of York, 3rd Duke of York during the Wars of the Roses. He was Lord Chancellor of Ireland from 1449 to 1451.

== Family ==
Walter Devereux was born in 1411 in Bodenham, Herefordshire to a senior Walter Devereux and his wife Elizabeth Bromwich, daughter of the Lord Justice of Ireland, Thomas Bromwich. By his grandmother, Agnes Crophull, he was a nephew of Sir Thomas Parr (d.1464), great-grandfather of Catherine Parr, queen consort to King Henry VIII.

Walter Devereux married Elizabeth Merbury in 1427. She was a daughter of Sir John Merbury, Chief Justice of South Wales and his wife Alice Pembridge. They had the following children:

- Walter Devereux, 8th Baron Ferrers of Chartley (c. 1431 – 22 August 1485).
- Anne Devereux (c. 1433 – after 1486)
- Sybil Devereux (c. 1435 - before 1499)
- Sir John Devereux (c. 1437 - 1511).
- Katherine Devereux (1438)

== Wars of the Roses and career ==
His first residence was Bodenham and the core of his Devereux family estates. With the death in 1436 of his grandmother Agnes Crophull, followed by that of her widower John Merbury in 1438, Walter inherited the remainder of his Devereux lands and the Merbury estates.

Walter Devereux was a knight by 1429 when he first represented Hereford in Parliament. He would represent Hereford again in 1434, 1450, and 1459. He served as sheriff of Herefordshire in 1447.

Walter Devereux served with the Duke of York in France, and remained his supporter throughout the War of the Roses. After York made a declaration at Ludlow in February 1452 declaring his loyalty to the King, but wish to free the Court from bad advisors. The King did not respond, and York took to the field calling in his supporters including Walter Devereux, and marched on London. The King marched out to meet them, and eventually found York entrenched at Dartford Heath. The confrontation was resolved peacefully, but skirmishing followed leading to Devereux being attainted for treason by Parliament in 1452. At this time Devereux began holding Wigmore Castle for the Yorkists.

On 22 May 1455 the first Battle of St. Albans was fought north of London traditionally marking the opening of the War of the Roses. A Yorkist victory that included the capture of the King, restored the Duke of York to complete power. Shortly after the victory Parliament pardoned Walter Devereux. As the King and the Lancaster party manoeuvred to reverse their losses, outbursts of lawlessness grew on the Welsh Marches. Walter Devereux, Constable of Wigmore Castle, was up in arms. In the summer of 1456, he descended on Hereford with the castle’s garrison and captured the mayor and justices. Devereux then brought before the justices several local men whom the justices were obliged to condemn to death, and then he had them hanged. Devereux followed this by mustering a force of 2000 archers from Gwent, and marched on the castles at Carmarthen and Aberystwyth, which he took by assault. Afterwards, he declared a commission of ‘oyer and terminer’ to judge and condemn more people whom he believed hostile to York. Among his prisoners were Edmund Tudor, the king’s half-brother, and Robert Rees, Keeper of the Welsh Seal.

Devereux was granted land in Drogheda in Ireland in 1459.

== Lord Chancellor ==
He was appointed Lord Chancellor of Ireland in 1449: by coincidence, his wife's uncle Sir Laurence Merbury had been Deputy Lord Chancellor in the early years of the century. His term as Chancellor was brief and likely uneventful. In 1451, Richard Plantagenet, 3rd Duke of York, Lord Lieutenant of Ireland appointed his son, the 8-year-old Edmund, Earl of Rutland, as the new Lord Chancellor. Since Rutland was under age, his duties were taken over by Deputy Chancellor Edmund Oldhall.

== Death ==
Walter Devereux died on the 22 or 23 of April in 1459.

== General Reference ==
- Cokayne, G.E. Complete Peerage. (New York; St. Martin's Press, 1984). Volume V, page 321 to 333, Ferrers
- Duncumb, John. Collections Towards the History and Antiquities of the County of Hereford, Volume 2, Issue 1. (Hereford: EG Wright, 1812). Page 37, Broxash Hundred
- Mosley, Charles (editor). Burke's Peerage & Baronetage, 106th Edition. Chicago: Fitzroy Dearborn Publishers, 1999. Page 1378

== Specific References ==
Preceded by Sir John Merbury	Lord of Lyonshall; 1436–1459	Succeeded by Walter Devereux, 8th Baron Ferrers of Chartley

Legal offices
Preceded by Richard Wogan	Lord Chancellor of Ireland; 1449–1451	Succeeded by Edmund, Earl of Rutland
