= Oyer and terminer =

Term in English law: to hear and determine

In English law, oyer and terminer (/ˈɔɪ.ər ... ˈtɜːrmɪnər/; a partial translation of the Anglo-French oyer et terminer, which literally means 'to hear and to determine') was one of the commissions by which a judge of assize sat. Apart from its Law French name, the commission was also known by the Law Latin name audiendo et terminando, and the Old English-derived term sac and soc.

By the commission of oyer and terminer the commissioners (in practice the judges of assize, though other persons were named with them in the commission) were commanded to make diligent inquiry into all treasons, felonies and misdemeanours whatever committed in the counties specified in the commission, and to hear and determine the same according to law. The inquiry was by means of the grand jury; after the grand jury had found the bills of indictment submitted to it, the commissioners proceeded to hear and determine by means of the petit jury. The words oyer and terminer were also used to denote the court that had jurisdiction to try offences within the limits to which the commission of oyer and terminer extended.

== Use in Scotland ==
By the Treason Act 1708, the Crown had the power to issue commissions of Oyer and Terminer in Scotland for the trial of treason and misprision of treason. Three Lords of Justiciary had to be in any such commission. An indictment for either of the offences mentioned could be removed by certiorari from the court of Oyer and Terminer into the High Court of Justiciary.

Commissions of Oyer and Terminer in Scotland have been exercised at various points in history, for example, the trial of Radicals during the "Radical War" of 1820.

== Use in the United States ==
In the United States Oyer and Terminer was the name once given to courts of criminal jurisdiction in some states, including Delaware, Georgia, New Jersey and Pennsylvania. New York had courts of Oyer and Terminer for much of the 19th century, but these courts were abolished by a change in the state constitution, effective in 1896. The New York court's jurisdiction was the same as that of the Court of General Sessions or County Court, except that Oyer and Terminer had jurisdiction over crimes punishable by life imprisonment or death.

Before the founding of the United States, Colonial Massachusetts Governor William Phips created a court of Oyer and Terminer for the Salem witch trials on May 27, 1692, consisting of Mr. Stoughton, Maj. Richards, Maj. Gidny, Mr. Wait Winthrop, Samuel Sewall, Mr. Sargeant, as well as Maj. Nathaniel Saltonstall, who soon withdrew in dissatisfaction and was replaced by Jonathan Corwin. (Corwin had been one of the two main judges of the early proceedings in Salem, often signing his name under John Hathorne.) The quorum was five of these seven. It was dissolved by Governor Phips on October 29, 1692, when the trials were reflected upon and disapproved of.
