= William Devereux (1219–1265) =

- Born: 1219
- Died: 4 August 1265 (aged 45–46); Battle of Evesham
- Spouses: (1) Daughter of Hugh Bigod, 3rd Earl of Norfolk (2) Maud de Giffard
- Issue: William Devereux; Margery Devereux; Simon Devereux of Staunton; Roger Devereux of Bishopstone; Maud Devereux; John Devereux; Thomas Devereux; Sibilla Devereux
- Father: Stephen Devereux
- Mother: Isabel de Cantelupe

William Devereux (1219–1265) was an important Marcher Lord who held Lyonshall Castle controlling a strategically vital approach to the border of Wales. The castle's significance was heightened by the rebellion of Llywelyn ap Gruffudd, Prince of Wales. With strong family ties to the politically powerful families of Cantilupe and Giffard, his support was strongly sought after by Henry III and Simon de Montfort throughout the Second Barons' War.

== Life ==
=== Birth and Ancestry ===
William Devereux was born in 1219, the son of Stephen Devereux and Isabel de Cantilupe. She was the daughter of William de Cantilupe (died 1239) and Mazilia Braci. His father had risen to be a powerful member of the inner circle of William Marshal, 1st Earl of Pembroke, which led to a prominent role during the regency of Henry III. The Devereux family had been prominent along the Welsh Marches since the conquest, and William was a descendant of the Domesday land holder, William Devereux. The coat of arms for Devereux portrayed on his mother's grant in 1242 was 'a fess and in chief three torteauxes.' His coat of arms was described as "argent, fess and three roundels in chief gules" or "gules od un fesse d'argent ove turteaus d'argent en le chief."

=== Early life ===
At his father's death, William was only 8 years old, and came under the sway of his maternal relatives including William de Cantelupe (died 1254), Lord of Abergavenny; Walter de Cantilupe, Bishop of Worcester; and Thomas de Cantilupe, Bishop of Hereford. His interests on the Welsh Marches were further guarded by his paternal uncles: John Devereux of Bodenham and Decies and Nicholas Devereux of Chanston. The close relationship of the Cantelupe family with Simon de Montfort, 6th Earl of Leicester would later influence Devereux's decisions during the Second Barons' War.

William Devereux's lands were taken into the King's hands on 17 March 1228 (Note: Stephen Devereux's principal seat was at Lyonshall Castle in Hereford. His manors included Ballingham, Frome Halmond (Herbert), Stoke Lacy, Holme Lacy, La Fenne (Bodenham), and Whitchurch maund in Herefordshire; (Cheddrehole) in Somerset; Lower Hayton in Salop; and Wilby in Norfolk. Additional lands included Clehonger, and Staunton-on-Wye in Herefordshire; Crowle in the Royal Forest of Feckham, and Staunton in Worcester; Guiting and Oxenhall in Gloucestershire; and Trumpington in Cambridgeshire.) (excluding the dower of his mother, Isabel) (Note: Isabel de Cantelupe’s dower included Oxenhall, Trumpington, Frome Halmond and Whitchurch maund) and initially placed under the control of Gilbert de Lacy, Lord of Weobley. De Lacy was summoned to mediate a dispute in 1229 over rent due the Prior of Leonard in Pyon (Wormsley) from the lands granted them by William's father, Stephen. When Gilbert de Lacy died about 1230, Devereux's estates were placed under the direct guardianship of Gilbert's father, Walter de Lacy, Lord of Meath. (Note: On 2 May 1234 (Reading, Close, 18 Hen III, membrane 25) indicates that as Walter de Lacy was on the King’s service in Ireland, the Sheriff of Hereford was commanded to respite till the Quizaine of Michaelmas the plaint in his county by the King’s writ between Walter de Baskerville, complainant, and the said Walter deforcient, touching the daughters of Stephen Devereux.)

Gilbert de Lacy also was involved in an ongoing dispute that began in 1221 with the Abbot of Saint Peter's in Gloucester over the appointment of a priest for the Church of Stoke Lacy. Following his father's death, William Devereux became embroiled in this controversy, and ultimately yielded the right to the Abbots in 1261 (45 Henry III). This would later be confirmed by his son, William Devereux, Baron Devereux of Lyonshall, after his death.

His lands at Lower Hayton were held from him by Giles de Clifford, and Giles was in the service of Richard Marshal, 3rd Earl of Pembroke. Following Marshal's death at the Battle of the Curragh in 1234 the King had Lower Hayton seized by the sheriff of Salop, and it was not returned to William Devereux's control until he came of age in 1240.

=== Principal landholdings ===
As William Devereux came of age he directed his efforts at re-establishing control over his father's estates and his position as a powerful Marcher Lord. The Testa de Nevill showed him holding at least four and a half fees in Herefordshire, and a half fee at Lower Hayton, county Shropshire. The center of his lordship was his castle at Lyonshall in Herefordshire. He possessed the manors of Ballingham, Frome Haymond (Halmond), Holme Lacy, Luntley, Lawton, Stoke Lacy, La Fenne (Bodenham), and Whitchurch maund in Herefordshire; Oxenhall and Guleing in Gloucestershire; Cheddrehole in Somersetshire; Lower Hayton in Shropshire; and Trumpeton (Trumpington) in Cambridgeshire. He held additional lands at Cattelegh (Cattelee), Clehonger, Heregast (Hergest Ridge), and Staunton-on Wye in Herefordshire; and Stanton in Worcestershire.

In 1237 William Devereux released the wardship and marriage of Robert de Barewe to Alice de Mynors. A proclamation was made about 29 Sep 1244 following the death of Robert de la Berwe that any Jew who had claim to the estate needed to come forward before 28 Nov 1244. On that day the sheriff indicated claims only from Sampson, son of Moses, and Meyr le Petiti. They were instructed to appear on 29 Jan 1245 to account with William Devereux, guardian of Robert's lands. On 20 April 1248 Richard of Juveny, steward of Richard de la Bere, submitted to the king's court a request to recover the lands of Richard de la Bere which are in the kings hands following a default on a plea of warranty against William Devereux.

William Devereux brought an assize de morte d’ancestor in 1238 against Walter de la Hide for back rent in Hyde (part of Putley), Hereford. He withdrew his claim following the gift of a sparrowhawk.

About 1240 William was mentioned in Walter de Lacy's charter describing the grant of L30 rent in Holme Lacy (Herefordshire) and the village of Hay (Ireland) to Simon de Clifford (Note: Son of Walter II de Clifford) for the manor of Yarkhill (Herefordshire). Devereux also witnessed the grant of Katherine, daughter of Walter Lacy of Land in Cofham (Note: probably Corsham, County Wiltshire, or Corsham, county Hampshire) to Acornbury Priory. During Easter 1244 Margery, widow of Walter de Lacy, sued William Devereux for one third of 2 mills in Hereford, which she claimed as part of her dower.

He confirmed in 1240 his father, Stephen's grant to Wormsley Priory that had required mediation by Gilbert de Lacy in 1229. (Note: Know (etc.) that we, William de Ebroicis and my heirs, will from this hour forward shall keep and hold to all of the gifts, concessions and alms to the Priory and Convent of Wormsley which our father, Stephen of Ebroicis, gave to the said Priory and Convent, that he bequeathed or granted in the Testament including the lands, possessions, tithes, alms, pastures in so far as can be clearly understood and as witnessed (etc.), both for the benefit of the said Priory and Convent and as more fully contained in the Charter or Charters, seal or seals, or our father, Stephen, as mentioned (etc) as given this date at ‘Wike’ in Worcester, in the year of the Lord M.CC.XL. (1240)) In 1241 William forgave 10 marks of rent owed by Wormsley for the use of Holme Lacy in exchange for the blessings of the church for him and his heirs. There would be further disagreement in 1242 over a pond and alder grove in Hereford with Thomas de Fauconburg, Canon of Hereford, that had been disputed by his father, Stephen Devereux, in 1221; and estover in his woods of Lyonshall in 1243. The dispute was finally settled in 1248. In a final concord William conceded 2 acres of woods in Kingswood in frank almoin; common pasture in his warrens at Lyonshall and his fields; and two mills in Lyonshall, for which he also granted wood for their construction and rights of ingress and egress, along with the suit his men owed to the mills. He also remitted and quitclaimed 6 shillings rent, which he drew from the prior, and gave the prior 2 marks. In return, the Prior remitted and quitclaimed any other rights of estover he might have in William's woods; agreed to move a certain mill to a new location and quitclaim it to William; as well as renouncing some ways and paths and right of pannage for fifty pigs, all in the wood of ‘Kerdeslg’ (Eardsly?). On 24 June 1249 the church of Hereford confirmed their acceptance of the concord. On 14 April 1256 William Devereux again confirmed the charters and grants of his father, Stephen Devereux, to the church of Saint Leonard of Wormsley (de Pyon). This was witnessed by his cousin, Walter Devereux.

He secured a writ from the King in 1244 restoring Wilby manor, Norfolk, which had been seized as terra Normannorum. (Note: Terra Normannorum ("Land of the Normans") was land so called in the reign of Henry III being such as had been lately held by some noble Norman, who, by adhering to the French king or dauphin, had forfeited his estate in England, which by this means became an escheat to the crown. Definition from “A Law Dictionary and Glossary” by Alexander Mansfield Burrill (New York; Baker, Voorhis & Co., Law Publishers, 1870: vol. 2, page 521)) Frome Herbert (Halmond) was returned to his mother, Isabel de Cantilupe, as part of her dower that same year. On 2 October 1251 William de Nucemaigne filed a writ of novel disseisin against William Devereux for tenements in Frome Halmond.

In summer 1242 the inheritance of 2 hides of land in Erdicot (Gloucester) valued at 100 shillings was disputed, and the possession was shown to be held of the Prior of the Hospital of Saint John of Jerusalem by warranty of Nicholas Pointz through charter of William Devereux. Devereux claimed that this should revert to him based on the terms of inheritance. (Note: They had originally been granted this church by William’s great-grandfather, John Devereux, who gave them the church of Oxenhall with lands, tithes, and observances, and others, and the right of the patronage of the church, in the year of our Lord 1186 on the Kalends in April, and the time of King Henry the second, and brother Garner, of Naples, prior of the Hospital of St. John in England.) (Note: Curia Regis Roll: One month of St. Michael, 6 Richard I, 27 Oct 1194. The grant of the deceased ancestors of Walter Devereux to the brothers of the Hospital of Jerusalem of 2 marks rents in Oxenhall as gifted in the present written Charter, the justiciar is directed to insure you receive them…) About 1243 William Devereux was again called to answer why the 100 shillings of this land had not been paid, and the Prior called to answer why he withheld William's charter. On 25 March 1244 the Hospitallers attorned Robert le Deveneis and William Joindre in the ongoing dispute over the unjust withholding of the charter. On 11 February 1255 further disputes regarding Oxenhall required the King to grant William peace from the sheriffs of the county until they were settled.

On 12 November 1251 the King granted to ‘William de Ebroicis and his heirs’ free warren in his demesne lands in Oxenhall of county Gloucester; Lenhales (Lyonshall), Frome Haymund (Halmond), Hamme (Holme Lacy), Stoke Lacy, La... (Lawton), Baldingham (Ballingham), Luntelegh (Luntley), Cattelegh (Cattelee), and Heregast of county Hereford.

Following William Devereux's marriage to Maud de Giffard about 1258, Lady Sibyl de Giffard transferred the wardship of Robert de Beysin to him. In October 1258 John Chete sued William Devereux and others about damaging his fish-pond and stealing his fish in Brosely, county Salop. A few months later Ralph de Coven and Roger de Eyton sued William (and his wife Maud), and the Bishop of Hereford over the advowson of the Church of Broseley. On 10 July 1260 Robert de Beysin's had a suit of novel disseisin against William Devereux and his wife, Matilda, concerning the manor of Billingsly. Robert de Beysin took advantage of the political upheaval occurring in England during this time to use armed men to seize and hold the manor of Billingsly, which remained in the custody of William Devereux, and on 20 March 1261 the king commanded the sheriff of Shropshire to remove Robert and restore the manor to Devereux. Beysin came of age in 1263, and on 22 September an Inquiry Post-mortem was made into his father, Adam de Beysin's estates which identified his wardship with William Devereux. In 1284 Maud de Giffard, now a widow, pursued a suit of novel disseisin against Robert's heir, Walter de Beysin, concerning a tenement in Billingsly.

=== Career ===
Following the death of Llywelyn the Great on 11 April 1240, he was succeeded by his son, Dafydd ap Llywelyn. Henry III called the Welsh and Marcher Lords including William Devereux to gather at Gloucester on 15 May 1240. The Welsh continued to resist, and the king invaded Gwynedd forcing Dafydd to sign the Treaty of Gwerneigron on 29 August 1241.

In late 1244, following the death of Gruffydd ap Llywelyn Fawr on 1 March 1244 at the Tower of London, the king granted estates in Powys to Gruffydd ap Gwenwynwyn triggering a revolt in Wales requiring the king to send an army, which included Devereux. The English army defeated the Welsh at the Battle of Montgomery in late February 1245. On 6 September 1245 the king gave William Devereux 10 oaks from the Haye in Hereford for his use as reward for his faithful service.

Dafydd died on 25 February 1246, and was succeeded by Llywelyn ap Gruffudd. In 1247 Henry III intervened again and came to terms with the Welsh with the Treaty of Woodstock.

William Devereux accompanied King Henry III on his expedition to suppress a rebellion in Gascony. The king arrived in August 1253, and remained there until a treaty was signed with Alphonso X in April 1254. On 2 October 1254 the King ordered that William Devereux was to receive the equivalent of 100 shillings sterling in cloth or other goods as payment towards wages earned by his service.

On 24 July 1256 William Devereux was summoned to serve on a jury. The itinerant justices of Somerset were investigating the accusation by William fitzGeoffrey and Roger fitzWilliam that Alexander de Montfort had a role in the death of William Wympel. Due to his involvement with the trial he was granted quittance of the common summons in the county of Lincoln on 12 August 1256.

In February 1257 Llewelyn invaded South Wales. On 10 May 1257 a council was ordered to aid Sir John de Grey who had been appointed by Prince Edward to defend the Welsh Marches between county Cheshire and South Wales. The council was to include the marcher lords Humphrey (IV) de Bohun, earl of Hereford and Essex; Humphrey (V) de Bohun the Younger; Reginald FitzPiers; Roger Mortimer (1st Baron Mortimer); William Devereux; Walter de Clifford; William de Stuteville; Gruffydd ap Gwenwynwyn (Lord of Powys Wenwynwyn), Thomas Corbet (Baron of Caus); John l’Estrange (of Ellesmere and Knockin); John fitzAlan (Lord of Clun and Oswestry); Fulk (IV) fitzWarin; Gruffydd ap Madog (Lord of Dinas Bran); and Ralph le Botiller. In June an English army was wiped out at the Battle of Cadfan. In August Henry III raised a new army at Chester and invaded North Wales, but withdrew in September. For his quick response to the general summons, Devereux was released from 40 shillings that he had been fined by justices sitting in county Norfolk on 27 October 1257. Henry III, unable to campaign further that season, released his army for the winter, and sent Roger Clifford to stock the castle at Carmarthen. On 14 March 1258 orders were given to William Devereux and the other lords to gather again on 16 June at Chester with horse and arms. Llywelin advanced into South Wales and on his return desolated the lands of Gruffydd ap Madog at Bromfield.

Another crisis gripped England in 1258. The barons revolted in anger over the way the King was raising funds and the influence of the Poitevins at court. In April Montfort and other major barons formed an alliance, and Hugh Bigod marched on parliament and carried out a coup d'état. This led to the Provisions of Oxford being passed on 22 June placing greater power in the hands of the barons, and enacting governmental reforms. As disagreements arose among the barons, further reforms were passed as the Provisions of Westminster in October 1259.

In January 1260 Llywelyn broke the truce and attacked the lands of Roger de Mortimer, and Builth Castle. The king summoned William Devereux and the other Marcher Lords to gather without delay. On 29 March 1260 Devereux and the other Lords were further directed to appear at London on 4 April 1260. During the Fall Llywelyn captured castle Builth, and on 1 August 1260 William Devereux and the other lords were instructed to come with horse and arms to Shrewsbury on 8 September.

During this period England slipped into the Second Barons' War as the struggle for power between the crown and rebellious barons, led by Simon de Montfort, reasserted itself. Devereux remained loyal to Henry III until the very end of the conflict. On 3 February 1261 the King pardoned William Devereux for permitting the escape of Adam le Provost. Provost had been arrested for the felony of fleeing to the church and renouncing the realm.

When the King obtained absolution from the Pope for his oath to uphold the Provisions of Oxford, he sent a communication on 17 February 1261 to William Devereux instructing him to come to London immediately with his men, horses and arms to be in place before the assembly of Parliament. On 12 June 1261, the King announced his absolution, and launched a counter coup against the baronial forces. He purged disloyal sheriffs, and seized control of many royal castles. On 26 August 1261 the king commanded William Devereux to be ready by 29 September 1261 to support the king is his efforts to throw off the restrictions placed on him. William Devereux was rewarded on 16 September 1261 with four live bucks and six live does from the stock in the royal park at St Briavels Castle. Over the next two years the country teetered on the edge of civil war.

In 1262 Llywelyn ap Gruffyd attacked the Welsh Marches again. On 22 December 1262 the king commanded William Devereux to appear with arms and horses on 9 January 1263 at Hereford to counter this invasion. On 24 January 1263 William Devereux was further commanded to come on 5 February 1263 to Hereford. Once there William and the other lords summoned were to divide the gathered forces for the defense of their castles and lands, and to insure that their castles were kept in good repair. On 3 March 1263 the English fought the Welsh at the Battle of Abergavenny. On 15 April 1263 Prince Edward specifically begs his father to command Will d’Evereus’ to “quod in castro suo de le Hales” and “moram faciet ac partes suas viriliter defendat.“ This translates to say, “that in his castle of Lyonshall he should stay and vigorously defend his estates.” On 25 May 1263 the king again commanded William Devereux to appear with horses and arms on 1 August 1263 at Worcester for a campaign against Llywelyn. For his ongoing faithful service the King ordered William be given a gift of 2 deer from the forests of Salop on 13 September 1263.

Henry III's unpopular policies finally brought out open conflict, and the de Montfort led revolt began on the Welsh marches. On 20 January 1264 the king proclaimed that Hugh Bigod and Rogert Aguyllun would insure on behalf of the king that Roger Clifford; Roger de Leybourne; John de Vaux; Ralph Basset; John Giffard; Hamo l’Estrange; Hugh de Turberville; William de Huntingfield; and William Devereux would make appropriate amends to the Archbishop of Canterbury for damages and violence committed against the church in the province of Canterbury. Fighting broke out in earnest when the King marched into the midlands in April 1264. Devereux was present with the king's forces on 6 April when Prince Edward captured Northampton Castle in the Battle of Northampton. Following the battle William Devereux pledged his manors of Stoke Lacy and Lawton to Roger de Mortimer, 1st Baron Wigmore to ransom Adam le Despencer. The ransom was to be 1000 marks to be paid as 100 marks a year beginning on 1 August 1264.

William Devereux fought on the King's behalf at the Battle of Lewes on 14 May 1264. Henry III, his brother Richard of Cornwall, and Prince Edward were all captured, and by imprisoning the King, Montfort became the de facto ruler of England.

At the Council of Worcester it was agreed that all prisoners who had been captured up to this point in the conflict were to be delivered without any consideration of redemption. Part of the negotiation specifically provided for the release of the Marcher Lords who had supported Prince Edward.

On 7 July 1264 letters of safe conduct were granted through 25 July to William Devereux and other knights of the Welsh Marches to come to the king. It is probably at this time that Devereux switched his allegiance from the king to Simon de Montfort. The decision was probably influenced by his cousin, Thomas de Cantilupe, who had been appointed Lord Chancellor on 25 February 1264. By December 1264 Montfort had dealt with the Marcher Lords, and on 20 January 1265 Parliament was assembled at Westminster including the knights of the shire, and representatives of the cities and boroughs.

On 8 February 1265 William Devereux and John de Baalun were commissioned to inquire as to what appurtenances belonged to the office of gatekeeper for Hereford Castle, which had been granted to Philip de Leominster. They also were commissioned along with Roger de Chandos to investigate robberies and other trespasses committed in the city of Hereford.

On 6 March 1265 the King commanded Roger de Mortimer to return the lands pledged by William Devereux for the ransom of Adam le Despencer as this obligation had been voided following the Council of Worcester. Furthermore, on 2 April Devereux was instructed to return to Despencer the manor of Stanley, which he had received as collateral for the same ransom. On 29 April the king ordered the Prior of Leominster to release the charter he was holding in which William Devereux granted his manors to Mortimer until Despencer's redemption had been paid. On 17 May the Prior came to the king at Hereford and in his presence restored the charter to William Devereux.

On 15 May 1265 the Exchequer was instructed by the king to release William Devereux of 20 pounds he owed on behalf of Robert de Grendon in payment for a horse taken from him when the king was at Lewes. On 17 May Henry III gave William Devereux three deer from Feckenham Forest, and on 3 June four bucks and four does from the forests of Shropshire.

When hostilities resumed with the escape of Prince Edward from captivity on 28 May 1265, the Welsh Marches erupted in rebellion and William Devereux now marched with Simon de Montfort. The two sides met at the Battle of Evesham on 4 August 1265, and William Devereux died while fighting for the baronial cause.

=== Marriage ===
He first married a daughter of Hugh Bigod, 3rd Earl of Norfolk, and Maud Marshal about 1240, and they had children:

- Margery Devereux(~1242 to aft 1306) (Note: Margery married Sir John de Pitchford, sheriff of Louth and holder of lands in Ireland (Dowth in Meath, and Linns in Louth) and Shropshire (Pitchford). They had a son, Ralph de Pitchford. On 4 Nov 1272 (1 Edward I), Inquiry Post-Mortem of George de Cantilupo. …John de Pycheford (knight) agrees, adding that he espoused a kinswoman of the said George, viz. the daughter of William de Ebroicis, and diligently enquired the age of the said George from Sir Adam de Gurdun and Sir Robert de Tregoz and others of the said household…)
- William Devereux, Baron Devereux of Lyonshall (~1244) his heir
- Simon Devereux of Staunton on Wye (Note: Simon Devereux of Staunton/Staundon (Herefordshire)married first his distant cousin, Joan Devereux, daughter of Nicholas Devereux of Chanston. She was the widow of William Mauns of Folville by whom she had a son, Richard Mauns. Simon and Joan Devereux had children: William Devereux of Staundon, and Alice Devereux. Simon Devereux married a second time to Sarah de la Forde, and they had one son, John Devereux of Staunton. His descendant, Sir John Devereux of Staunton, attended parliament in 1404 and 1407.)
- Roger Devereux of Bishopstone (Hereford). (Note: Roger Devereux was summoned by the king to join him at the Battle of Evesham, and probably did so as there is no record of him forfeiting his estates. He married a woman named Katherine who held Bishopstone in dower as a widow in 1316. They had children: Nicholas, Thomas, and John. Thomas Devereux inherited his estates, and was identified as being of Bishopstone in 1334. On his death Bishopstone passed to his son, Roger II of Bishopstone, and then to his grandson, Roger III of Bishopstone. Roger III Devereux is not recorded to have had an heir, and the lands appear to have passed back into the main Devereux line upon his death.)

William Devereux's first wife died about 1254, and he married a second time about 1258 to Maud de Giffard as her second husband. (Note: Her first husband, Baldwin de Freville had died about 1256, and wardship of his lands and the marriage of her and their sons, Baldwin and Alexander, was granted to Eleanor, Queen of England. Maud de Giffard had married Baldwin de Freville as his second wife around 1254. Baldwin‘s first wife Lucia (married about 1240), daughter of Richard de Scalers, had died in 1253 after giving him a son, Richard de Freville (born ~1241; died 1299). Baldwin de Freville and Maud had four children, Baldwin (born ~1254; died 1289), Margaret (~1255), Sibilla (~1256), and Alexander (born ~1257; died 1328) before he died about 1257. On the Patent Rolls for 10 July 1253 Baldwin de Freville sold to Sibyl Giffard the marriage of his son and heir (Richard). An inquiry in 1299 at Tadington described a messuage and 2 carucates land, and 64 s rent held of the King in chief by service of 1/3 knight’s fee of the Barony of Cormailes; and 12 acres of land which he bought of fee of Monseleye. Lady Maud de Ebroicis, and Baldwin her son, and Alexander brother of the said Baldwin were jointly enfeoffed by a charter of the said land etc., excepting the 12 acres. The said Alexander is his next heir and of full age.) She was the daughter of Hugh de Giffard and Sibyl de Cormeilles. Maud de Giffard's brothers were the politically powerful Godfrey de Giffard (Bishop of Worcester), and Walter de Giffard (Archbishop of York, and Bishop of Bath and Wells). Both brothers would later become Chancellors of England. Her sister was Mabel de Giffard, Abbess of Shaftesbury Abbey. William Devereux and Maud de Giffard had children:

- Maud Devereux (~1259) (Note: Maud Devereux married Richard de Boylande who served as an itinerant justice in a dispute over land in Somerset in the year 1279, and for another dispute in 1288. In 1278, her mother and brother, William, gave reversion of Wilby in Norfolk to Maud and her husband, Richard de Boylande with a charter of free-warren for all his lands here and in Brisingham. By 1295 Richard de Boylande had a new wife, Ellen, suggesting Maud had died (probably before 1290), and William claimed an advowson on the property against Simon, Abbot of York, but lost the suit and was forced to abandon his claim.)
- Archdeacon John Devereux (~1261) (Note: John de Ebroicis entered the Church as was common for younger sons, and advanced under the patronage of his uncles: Godfrey de Giffard (Bishop of Worcester), and Walter de Giffard (Archbishop of York). He would hold the post of Canon of Ripon and Southwell by 1281 and Prebend of Oxton. His career would peak when he obtained the position of Archdeacon of Gloucester in 1288. In 1295 he also was inducted and resigned from the Benefice of Tredington in Worcester. In 1301 Bishop Godfrey de Giffard died, and identified his nephew, John de Ebroicis in his Will. He bequeathed him a mitre covered over with pearls, which had once belonged to his uncle the Northern primate (Walter de Giffard, Archbishop of York) in the hope, perhaps, that it might sometime rest upon his brow.)
- Master Thomas Devereux (~ 1263) (Note: Probably the Thomas de Ebroicis who was Rector of the Doncaster Deanery which was part of the Church of St. Elene’s of Treatton belonging to the patronage of the Lords of Furnival. Treeton was part of the manor of Whiston. Thomas Devereux, clerk, also was collated to the Benefice of Tredington in Worcester following the resignation of his brother in 1295)
- Sibyl Devereux (~1265) (Note: Sibilla is reported to have married Walter de Baskerville who died dsp. 1282. In the 1280s, Matilda, the widow of William de Ebroicis (and Sibilla’s mother), contested William de Ebroicis (Sibilla’s half brother) over 8 pounds of rent in Guleing (Gloucester) and Trumpeton (Cambridgeshire). William Devereux granted the right to the said rent to Matilda, and Baldwin de Frevil (son of Matilda). The remainder to Alexander de Freville (brother of Baldwin), and Margaret and Sibilla (and heirs of Sibilla) the daughters of Matilda. Sibilla married a second time to John de Acton. On Nov 11, 6 Edward II (1312), an IPM was done for John de Acton in regards to the manors of Couerne and Yausore, both in Herefordshire. The Couerne listing leads as follows: 10 d. yearly rent held of Richard Baskerville by service of ½ d. yearly; and a fourth part of the manor held, as the dower of Sybil his wife, of Richard de Baskerville by service of a ¼ knights fee: she was dowered by Walter de Baskerville, her first husband. Yausore was held as above, by service of ¼ knights fee. On November 20 of the same inquisition regarding Somerset, there is reference to the property of Ceddre Manor, a capital messuage of 40 acres arable land, 10 acres meadow, water-mill, rents, etc. held jointly by John de Acton with Sibyl, his wife, of a gift of William de Ebroycis of the Bishop of Bath. This was held by service of ½ knight’s fee, and was to go to his heir.)

=== Death ===
William Devereux was killed during the Battle of Evesham on 4 August 1265. His wife, Maud, applied to the King for a jeweled harness, which had been deposited in the treasury of the church at Hereford by her deceased husband. She obtained from the king a precept to the treasurer of the cathedral for their deliverance to her on 12 October 1265 at the request of her brother, Walter de Giffard, Bishop of Bath and Wells and the Chancellor of England.

William Devereux's lands were forfeited following this battle with exception by writ of the King on 3 October 1265 of Frome (Halmond), Ham (Holme Lacy), Wileby (Wilby), Oxonhal (Oxenhall), and 15 pounds of revenue in Heiton (Lower Hayton) for the maintenance of his widow, Maud. Sir John Giffard had been granted the lands of Gutinges (Guleing) and Oxenhale (Oxenhall) in Gloucester, and Maud de Giffard to hold of him. On 12 October Maud's brother, Walter de Giffard, further granted her for life the manors of Frome (Halmond), Hamme (Holme Lacy), Oxenhall, Wilby, Trompiton (Trumpington), and La Fenne (Bodenham); and the rents of Ballingham, Guting (Guleing), and Heynton (Hayton); and the meadow of Jarchull to hold to the value of 60 pounds of land a year. Bishop Giffard's position as Chancellor of England would continue to facilitate the recovery of the Devereux estates. Roger de Mortimer was granted the forfeited lands of William Devereux on 20 November 1265 with the exception of Lyonshall castle, which would be held by his son, Ralph de Mortimer (died 10 August 1274). William Devereux's lands would later be redeemed by his son according to the Dictum of Kenilworth. These terms are described in an entry of the plea rolls from 1266 (51 Henry III, membrane 32):

Whereas because of the trespasses which William de Evereus who stood with the King in the Battle of Lewes, was said to have done afterwards against the King and Edward his son, the King after his death gave his lands as he gave the lands of other adversaries in the time of the disturbance in the realm, and by the form of the award of Kenilworth, the King has power of making ordinances upon the state of such disinherited persons; he ordains that, as William the son and heir of the said William is prepared to stand to the said award to have his lands back, he shall pay within three years the ransom thereof to those to whom it belongs, to wit, the extent thereof for three years, so that according to the quantity of money he pays he shall have restitution of the said lands; saving to Maud late the wife of the said William for her life the assignment made to her of the said lands for the maintenance of herself and her children.

William Devereux's widow, Maud de Giffard, died in late August 1297. On 3 September 1297 Maud (de Giffard) Devereux was buried in Worcester Cathedral in a place arranged by her brother, Bishop Godfrey de Giffard, near his burial site.

== Notes ==
Preceded by Stephen Devereux	Lord of Lyonshall; 1228–1265	Succeeded by Roger Mortimer, 1st Baron Mortimer
