= Willersley and Winforton =

Civil parish in Herefordshire, England

Coordinates: 52.1206°N 3.01540°W

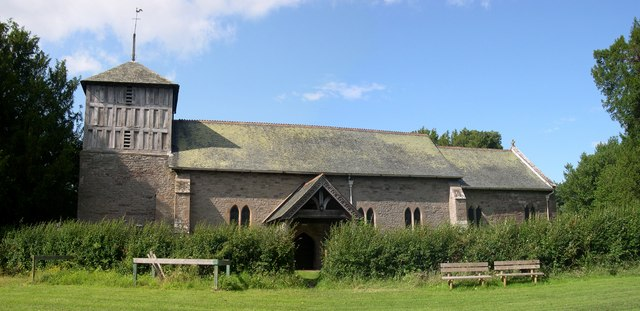
- St Michael's Church in Winforton

- Location within Herefordshire
- Population: 209
- OS grid reference: SO305474
  - London: 130 mi (210 km) ESE
- Unitary authority: Herefordshire
- Ceremonial county: Herefordshire
- Region: West Midlands
- Country: England
- Sovereign state: United Kingdom
- Post town: Hereford
- Postcode district: HR3
- Dialling code: 01544
- Police: West Mercia
- Fire: Hereford and Worcester
- Ambulance: West Midlands
- UK Parliament: North Herefordshire

Willersley and Winforton is a civil parish in west Herefordshire, England, and is approximately 14 miles (20 km) west-northwest from the city and county town of Hereford. The parish contains the village of Winforton and the farming hamlet of Willersley. The nearest towns are the market towns of Hay-on-Wye 5 miles (8 km) to the south-west, and Kington 6 miles (10 km) to the north. The physicist Sir Thomas Ralph Merton KBE, DSc, FRS, lived at Winforton during the Second World War.

== History ==
According to A Dictionary of British Place Names, Willersley derives from probably "a woodland clearing of a man called Wiglāff", from the Old English person name with 'lēah', and in the Domesday Book written as "Willaveslege". Winforton derives from probably a "farmstead or estate of a man called Winefrith" or "Winfrip", from the Old English person name with 'tūn', and in the Domesday Book written as "Widferdestune", and in 1265 as "Wynfreton". Thomas Blount, the antiquarian, described Willersley as very small, consisting of one house, but "standing very much on its antiquity, being reputed to pretend to a seniority before all, next the Minster of Hereford". The parish was given by the 8th-century Bishop Egwin of Evesham, to the monastery of Evesham.

Willersley and Winforton, as two separate but correlated manors, are listed in the Domesday Book within the hundred of Elsdon and the county of Herefordshire. Both manors in 1086 were part of the lands of Ralph of Tosny (1027 - 1102), of the Tosny family, and of Clifford Castle 3.5 miles (6 km) to the west, who had fought with William the Conqueror at the Battle of Hastings, was his standard-bearer, and supported him during the Norman Conquest. Ralph became Willersley and Winforton's manorial lord and William's tenant-in-chief, taking the manors from Earl Harold, the 1066 lord. Earl Harold's earlier fiefdom also included the adjacent manors of Eardisley, Kington, Lyonshall, Pembridge, and Titley, as part of his wider ownership of Herefordshire. Combined in the post-Conquest Willersley and Winforton manors were 3 freemen, 17 smallholders (middle level of serf owning about 5 acres (2.0 ha) of land, being below and with less land than villager), and 8 slaves, in 4 hides, otherwise ploughland defined by 4 lord's and 6 men's plough teams. One of the hides was held by a Welshman, who may have occupied a hermitage at Winforton.

The Tosnys later alienated their Winforton lands to the Muscegros family, this in the early 12th century, with Walter Muscegros holding the land, and later Miles Muscegros (Milo de Mucegros), who was Sheriff of Herefordshire in 1182. Walter Muscegros cleared land (assarted), for "a new chapel with other gifts, three loaves from his alms-basket whenever he was staying at Winforton, pasture for three cows, and keep for a palfrey". Walter Muscegros later gave lands to Alexander de Monyton, and a license to "brew in his own boiler".The possible religious site at Winforton at the time of Hugh Foliot, (bishop from 1219 to 1234), was affirmed by "Walter, a Canon regular of Wormsley Priory, [who] 'betook himself to a hermetical life in a little island in the River Wye within the manor' of Winforton. A chapel to the Blessed Virgin Mary and St Kenedred (grid reference SO295456), was built by Friar Walter; by the 17th century its foundations which remained on the north bank of the River Wye had been "grubbed up", the spot marked by a yew tree, and today indicated by a rectangular cropmark. After Friar Walter's death, Walter de Clifford (died 1263), the son to Walter de Clifford (died 1221), granted land and common pasture to the Isle of Winforton hermitage and its then friar Stephen, from the manor of Middlewood (grid reference SO288447), today in the parish of Clifford. Miles Muscegros' son, another Walter, gave to the chapel further land, woods, a mill, moorland and pasture, in return for performance of divine service. This benefice was augmented with similar gifts by Robert Whitney, the lord of Whitney and reaffirmed by his successor Sir Eustace Whitney. Winforton lord Walter Muscegros in the 1264–1267 Barons' War opposed Simon de Montfort in de Montfort's 1264 attack on Hereford, which led for some time to the Muscegros' loss of Winforton, which Walter Muscegros later gave to Alexander de Monyton, son to Roger Monnington (or Monyton), with a license to "brew in his own boiler". Alexander's brother, John (styled John Lestrange and lord of Monnington and Winforton), "granted the hermitage of Winforton (Wynfreton), with the consent of Stephen the Hermit to Wormesley priory (the church of St Leonard), in return for them celebrating divine service for the souls of Walter Muscegros (died before 2 December 1264) and his own."

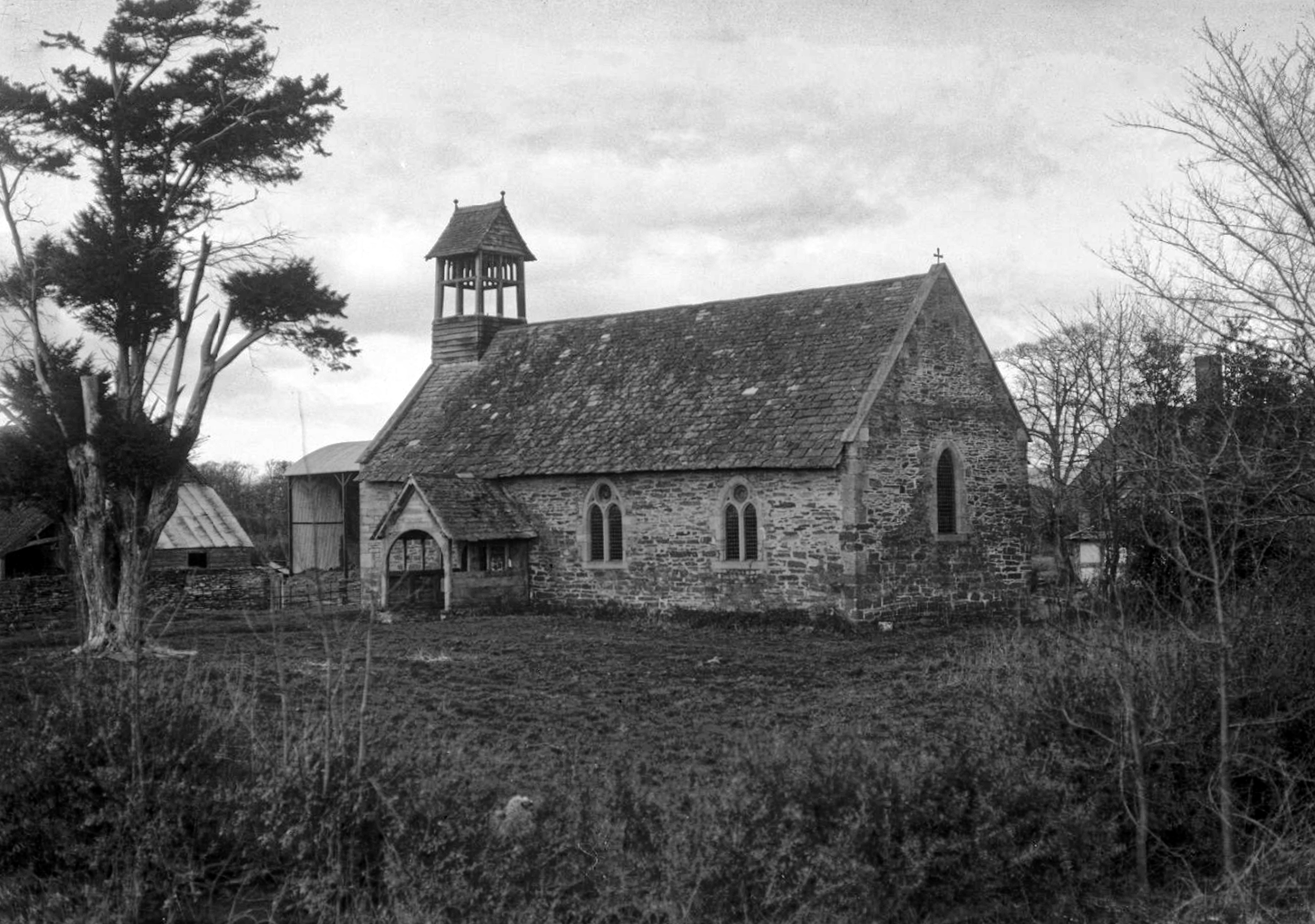
St Mary's church, Willersley

In the mid-19th century both Willesley and Winforton were reported as townships, and both in the hundred of Huntington, the Kington Union—poor relief and joint parish workhouse provision set up under the Poor Law Amendment Act 1834—and the archdeaconry and bishopric of Hereford. The main road from Hereford, through Hay-on-Wye, to Brecon ran through both parishes and villages. Each civil parish had its own parish church: St Mary Magdalene at Willesley and St Michael at Winforton, in their own ecclesiastical parish. St Mary's is described as an "old stone building", with a nave, chancel, and a wooden turret containing one bell, and is described as an "old stone building" and in "good repair", with a nave, a north transept, chancel, a part-wood tower, and contains an organ and five bells. The church parish register dates to 1764. It was restored in 1877. Both church parishes were rectories, in the gift of the Blisset and Domville families, which also provided the parish priests, and were lords of the manor and major parish landowners. Willersley parish area was 231 acres (93 ha), and Winforton, about 1,090 acres (440 ha), the soil mainly alluvial over a subsoil of gravel and clay. Nicholas Common, at the north from Winforton village, is listed as a significant landmark. The population of Willersley in 1851 was ten; Winforton, 159. Residing and trading in Winforton included the parish rector, a blacksmith, a carpenter, a boot and shoe maker who was also a shopkeeper, and five farmers, one of whom was also a maltster, another the licensee of The Sun Inn public house. Mail was serviced through the Hay-on-Wye post office which was the nearest money order office.

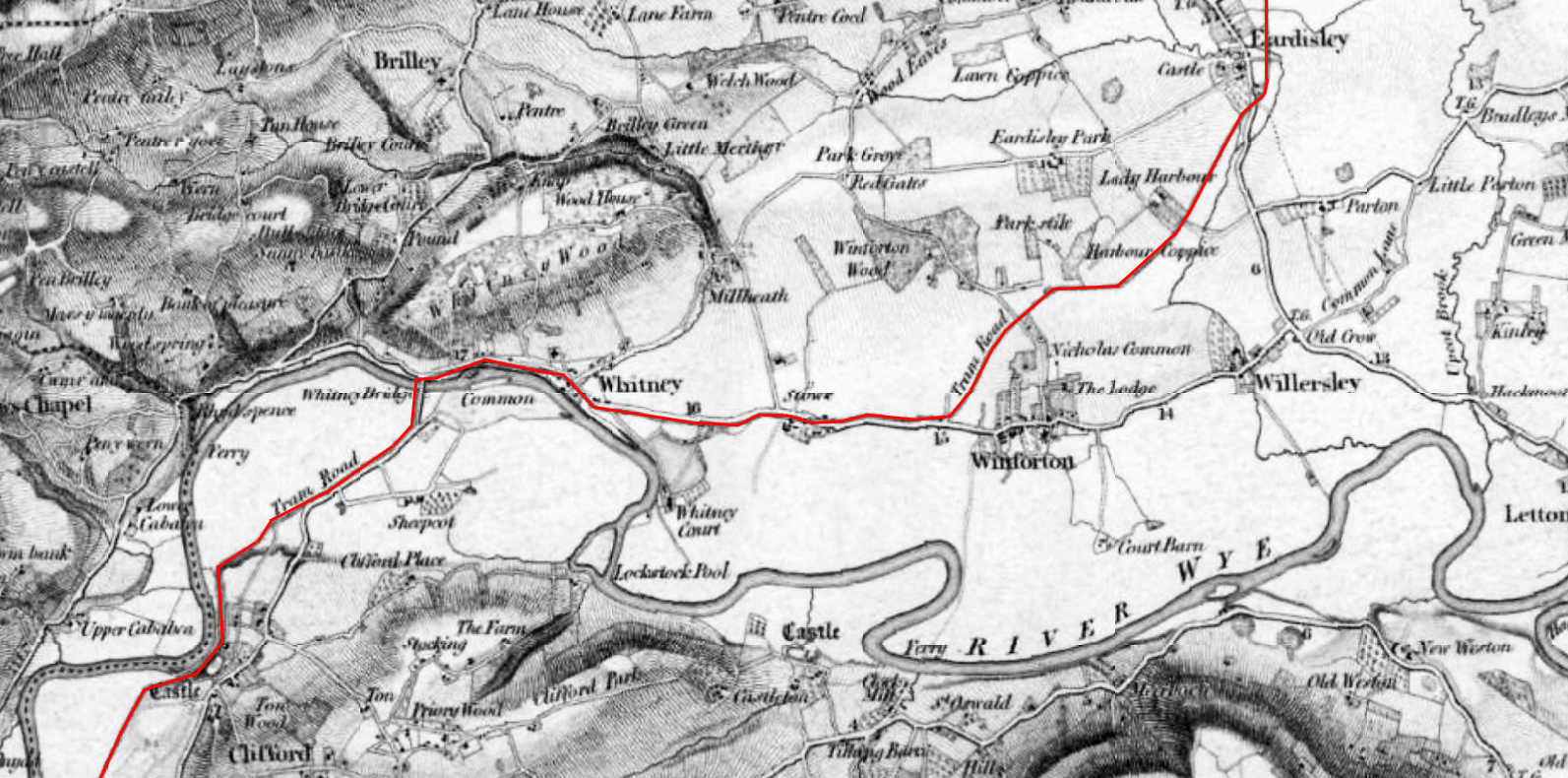
Willersley and Winforton Tram Road

In 1864 the Hereford, Hay and Brecon Railway, a branch of the Midland Railway, was complete which ran at the north of Winforton, the nearest line-stop at Eardisley railway station, just over 1 mile (1.6 km) to the north-east. In 1812, before the railway was built, the Brecon to Eardisley Tramroad, a 3 ft 6 in (1,067 mm) wide wagonway, (today shown on maps as the 'Old Tramway'), was instituted by an act of Parliament, and constructed through Winforton to Eardisley by 1818. The tramway, which ran locally from a crossing on the River Wye at the west between Clifford and Whitney-on-Wye, and laid with L-section plates to accommodate horse and waggon, brought coal and other goods from the Monmouthshire and Brecon Canal at Brecon, via Hay-on-Wye. Remnants of the tramway still exist, running through Nicholas Common and north-east, over Winforton Common Road, on to a now metalled road section (grid reference SO2972647664).

From the 1870s Both Willersley and Winforton were listed as part of the Kington county court district, Eardisley polling district, and the Bredwardine petty sessional division. Both ecclesiastical parishes were then listed as being in the rural deanery of Weobley. The Winforton parish living included a residence and 16 acres (6.5 hectares) of glebe, an area of land used to support the parish church and priest. St Michael's parish register dates to 1690. The population of Willersley in 1861 was 13; and in 1871, 9 who were the inhabitants of one house. The population of Winforton in 1861 was 162; and in 1871, 150 who were the inhabitants of 34 houses or separate occupiers. Willersley parish soil in the 1870s was described as loamy, on which was grown wheat, barley, roots, beans, and pasture, and Winforton, wheat, barley, roots, and fruit. Directory listed at Willersley was a farmer and landowner at Willersley Court. Residents at Winforton included the parish rector, parish churchwarden, the parish clerk, a school mistress, six farmers one who is the licensee of the Sun Inn, one who is the sub-postmaster, a cottage farmer who also a beer retailer and grocer, a farm bailiff, a blacksmith, a carpenter who is also a wheelwright, and a gardener. In 1872 a mixed parochial school for 30 pupils was erected at Winforton "at the joint expense of the parish church patron and the parishioners", which had an average attendance of 20; the parish rector and his family also ran a Sunday school. Mail for both parishes was serviced through Eardisley railway sub-office (R.S.O.), which was the closest money order and telegraph office,

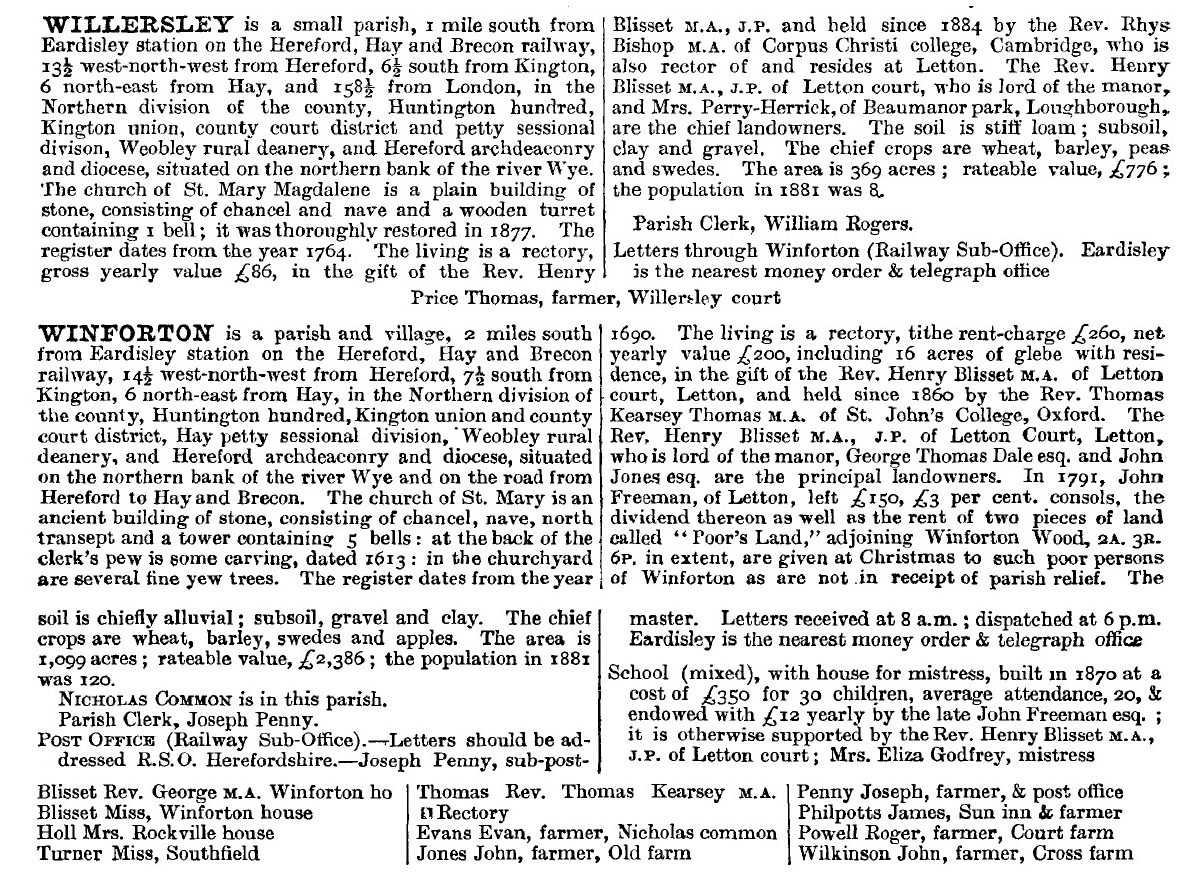
Willersley and Winforton in Kelly's Directory of Herefordshire 1885

By the 1880s both parishes were described as in the Northern division of Herefordshire, and now in the petty sessional division of Hay-on-Wye. Willersley parish area had increased to 369 acres (149 ha) through the addition of two detached parts of Eardisley parish in 1884, under the Divided Parishes Act. Winforton area remained as previously. In Willersley grew wheat, barley, peas and swedes; in Winforton, wheat, barley, swedes and apples. Willersley population in 1881 was 8, and included the parish clerk and the Willersley Court farmer. Winforton population in 1881 was 120, in 32 inhabited houses, families or separate occupiers, which included the school mistress, the parish priest living at Winforton House, and another at the parish rectory, and six farmers, one of whom ran the post office at the Railway Sub-Office (R.S.O.), one the licensee of The Sun Inn, and one operating at Nicholas Common. Directory listing shows Winforton's church [as St Mary's, actually St Michael's], containing "at the back of the clerk's pew is some carving, dated 1613", and having a churchyard with "several fine yew trees", and that a John Freeman from Letton, in 1791, left to the church a gift of £350, providing a dividend, and rent from "Poor's Land" of 2 acres 3 rood 6 perch, approximately 2.8 acres (1.1 ha). These gifts supported poor people of Winforton at Christmas who were not eligible for parish relief. A late John Freeman provided an endowment of £12 yearly for the parish mixed school which had a master's house attached.

In the 1890s, both parishes were part of the Eardisley and Kington polling district and electoral division of the county council. The chief landowner and lord of the manor for both parishes was the Rev. Henry Blisset of Letton Court at neighbouring Letton, with whom the rector of Willersley lived. Blisset provided the patronage for both parishes, and in 1895 he restored St Michael's Church at a cost of £1,500. Willersley population in 1891 was 9, including a farmer at Willersley Court. Winforton population in 1891 was 132, including the listed the school-mistress, the parish rector, a beer retailer, and four farmers. Mail for Willersley and Winforton was collected for processing at Hereford through Winforton R.S.O. and distributed through both parishes by mail cart. Letters to Willersley were addressed referencing Letton, and at Winforton, the Winforton, R.S.O. Eardisley was still the nearest money order and telegraph office. A carrier—transporter of trade goods, with sometimes people, between different settlements—operated on Thursday and Saturday in both Winforton and Willersley, with stops at the Red Lion and The Ship public houses. Residents at Willersley listed only a farming landowner. Of the six listed residents at Winforton were the school-mistress, and the two priests, one at Winforton house and the other at The Rectory. Commercial residents included a farm bailiff, a tailor, a dressmaker, and seven farmers, one of whom was the sub-postmaster, one the licensee of The Sun Inn, and one a beer retailer. The parish school was now a National School, with an average attendance of 17 pupils.

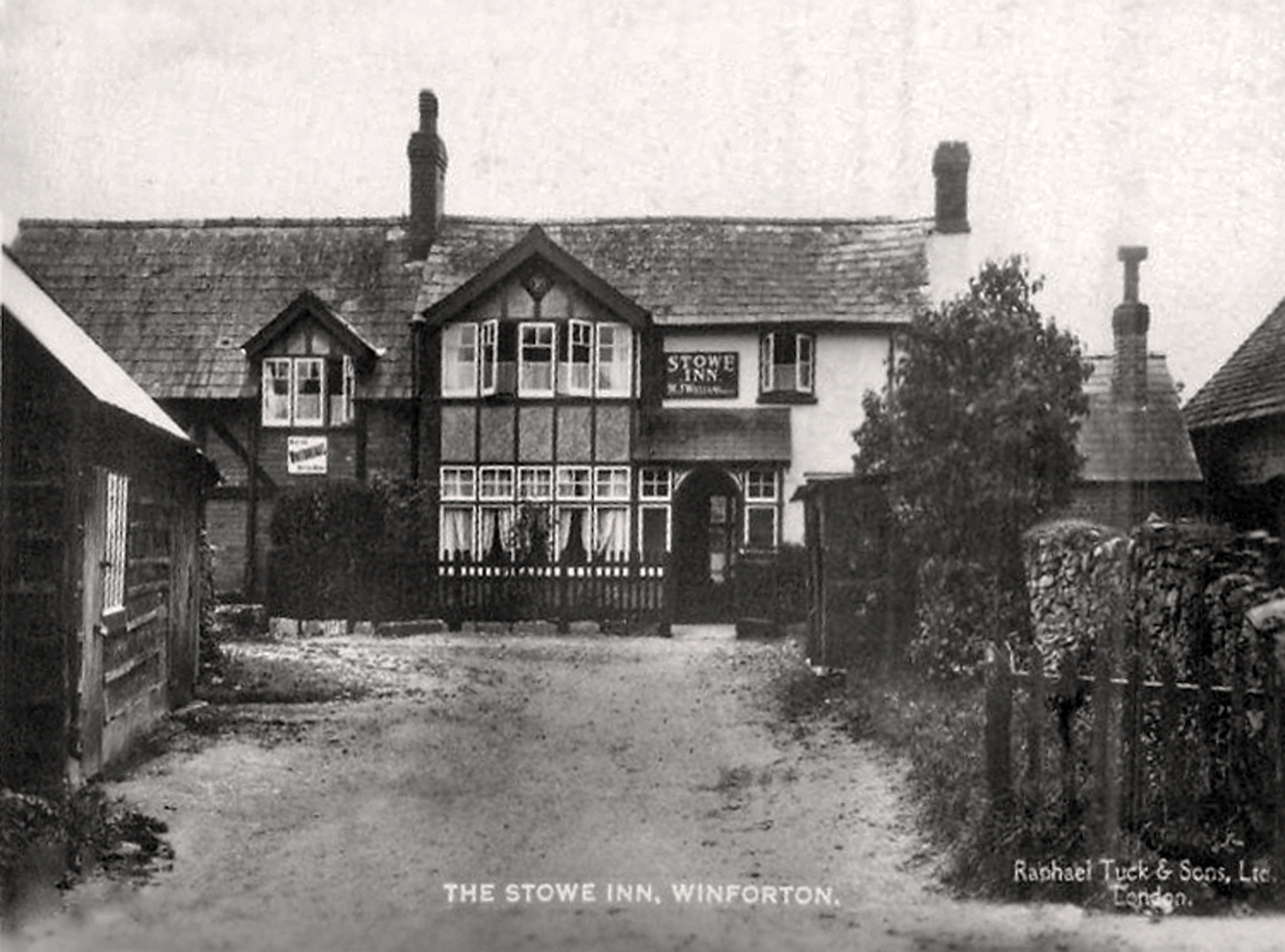
Stowe Inn in the early twentieth century

By the early 20th century, the closest railway station at Eardisley was not only on the Hereford, Hay and Brecon branch of the Midland Railway but also on the Leominster and Kington section of the Great Western Railway. Willersley is described as of 381 acres (154 ha) of land and 10 acres (4.0 ha) of water, with a 1911 population of 14 in the civil parish and 6 in the ecclesiastical. The rector of St Mary's still lived at Letton, and still lord of the manor and chief landowner. Mail, by means of Winforton, was processed at Hereford from where it was transported by motor vehicle. Winforton area was 1,085 acres (439 ha) of land and 29 acres (12 ha) of water, with a 1911 population of 128. Its school was now a Public Elementary for 24 pupils with an average attendance of 21. Residents at Winforton included the school mistress, a sub-postmistress, the parish sexton, a tailor at Chestnut Cottage (grid reference SO3005847046), the licensee of The Sun Inn, a beer retailer at Stowe (grid reference SO282470), a farm bailiff, and five farmers, one of whom was a carrier who still operated between the parish and Hay-on-Wye.

== Geography ==
Willersley and Winforton parish boundary at its greatest distance is approximately 2 miles (3 km) both north to south and east to west, and covers an approximate area of 1,587 acres (642 hectares). The parish is 200 feet (60 m) above sea level at the south rising to 280 feet (85 m) in the north. Adjacent Herefordshire parishes are Eardisley, at the north and north-east, Whitney-on-Wye at the west, and Clifford and Bredwardine at the south. The parish includes the village of Winforton and the farming hamlet of Willersley, and is rural, of farm complexes, fields, managed woodland and coppices, watercourses, ponds, residential properties and businesses. The River Wye flows west to east at the south, defining the parish boundary with Clifford and Bredwardine. A feeder stream of 1 mile (1.6 km) flows through Willersley and defines the parish boundary with Eardisley until it enters the Wye at the extreme east. A farther Wye feeder stream at the west, defining the parish border with Whitney-on-Wye, flows south 1 mile from the Whitney-on-Wye hamlet of Stowe on the A438 road. The A438, which connects the M5 motorway Junction 9 to Hereford, is the only major road through the parish, running west to east for 2 miles (3 km) and connecting Winforton and Willersley. There are no other through routes in the parish, these being only minor roads, cul-de-sacs, bridleways, farm tracks, property entrances and footpaths.

== Governance ==
Willersley and Winforton is represented in the lowest tier of UK governance by the three-parish Eardisley Group Parish Council, which also includes Eardisley and Whitney-on-Wye, with five members from Willersley and Winforton, four from Whitney-on-Wye, and thirteen from Eardisley. The purview of the parish council includes community buildings, planning, street lighting and furniture, allotments, monuments and memorials, cemeteries and crematoria, highways and traffic schemes, common pasture and open spaces. As Herefordshire is a unitary authority—no district council between parish and county councils—the parish sends councilors representing the approximately 43 square miles (27,520 acres) Castle Ward, which also contains the parishes of Almeley, Brilley, Eardisley, Kinnersley, Letton, Sarnesfield, Staunton on Wye, and Whitney-on-Wye, with an estimated joint population of 3,358, to Herefordshire County Council. Willersley and Winforton is part of the Northern Area Meeting Group of the Herefordshire three-parts Parish Council Area Meeting Groups.

Willersley and Winforton is represented in the UK parliament as part of the North Herefordshire constituency.

== Community ==
According to the 2011 Census, the parish population was 209, of average age 49, and in 92 households.

There are three scheduled bus routes that pass through the parish. Two routes, a Hereford to Builth Wells and a Worcester to Hay-on-Wye, run along the A438 through Willersley and Winforton, with stops at the Sun Inn in Winforton, and the A438-A411 junction in the east of Willersley. The third route, from Hereford to Almeley, touches the parish at the A438-A411 junction. A Dial-A-Ride bus service covering the parish is based at Hay-on-Wye. The closest rail connection is on the Welsh Marches line at Hereford railway station 14 miles (23 km) to the east-southeast.

The nearest National Health Service major hospital is Hereford County Hospital, 12 miles (19 km) miles east at Hereford, part of the Wye Valley NHS Trust. The nearest National Health Service doctor surgery is 4 miles (6 km) east at Staunton on Wye.

The nearest Herefordshire catchment area primary schools are Eardisley CofE Primary School, 1 mile (2 km) north-east at Eardisley, and Staunton-on-Wye Endowed Primary School, south-east at Staunton on Wye. The nearest secondary school is Lady Hawkins' School, to the east at Hereford. In latest Ofsted full inspections Eardisley CofE Primary School was rated Grade 2 'Good' (2018); Staunton-on-Wye Endowed Primary School Grade 1 'Outstanding' (2009); and Lady Hawkins' School Grade 2 'Good' (2018).

For religion the local parish church for Winforton is St Michael & All Angels, in the Deanery of Kington and Weobley of the Hereford Archdeaconry in the Diocese of Hereford. The Willersley part of the civil parish is served by the Eardisley with Bollingham & Willersley ecclesiastical parish.

Most businesses and amenities are centred on Winforton village, and include the Sun Inn public house, a sport fishing store, a guest house, an advertising leaflet company, a plumbing and central heating company, and a building and construction company.

== Landmarks ==
There are nineteen Grade II and two Grade II* listed buildings in Willersley and Winforton, including a church, a war memorial, houses and farmhouses, cottages and barns, all in the village of Winforton apart from two in Willersley and one south from Winforton

The Grade II* Church of St Michael (grid reference SO2987646976), dates to at least the early 13th century. It was enlarged in 1300, further altered in the 16th and 17th century, and restored in 1895. Of local sandstone and ashlar construction, it comprises a four-bay nave, a two-bay chancel, west tower, an 1895 south porch and short north transept, today converted to a vestry. The lower two storeys of the three-storey tower is of stone, the upper storey a wooden bell chamber with pyramidic roof and abat-sons. The interior contains a wooden chancel arch, a wagon roof to the nave and chancel, a 19th-century gilded reredos, a c.1300 piscina, a church organ with late 18th century casing which was enlarged in 1867, a 1701 altar rail with turned balusters. On to east and south-east window surrounds are masons' marks. The font, with "octagonal bowl and circular stem on two-stepped base", is 13th century, and the wooden pulpit inscribed as from 1613. The parish chest is from 1722. Memorials date to 1773, 1822 and 1859 with decorative urns, with others as c.1700 grave ledger slabs to members of the Guest family.

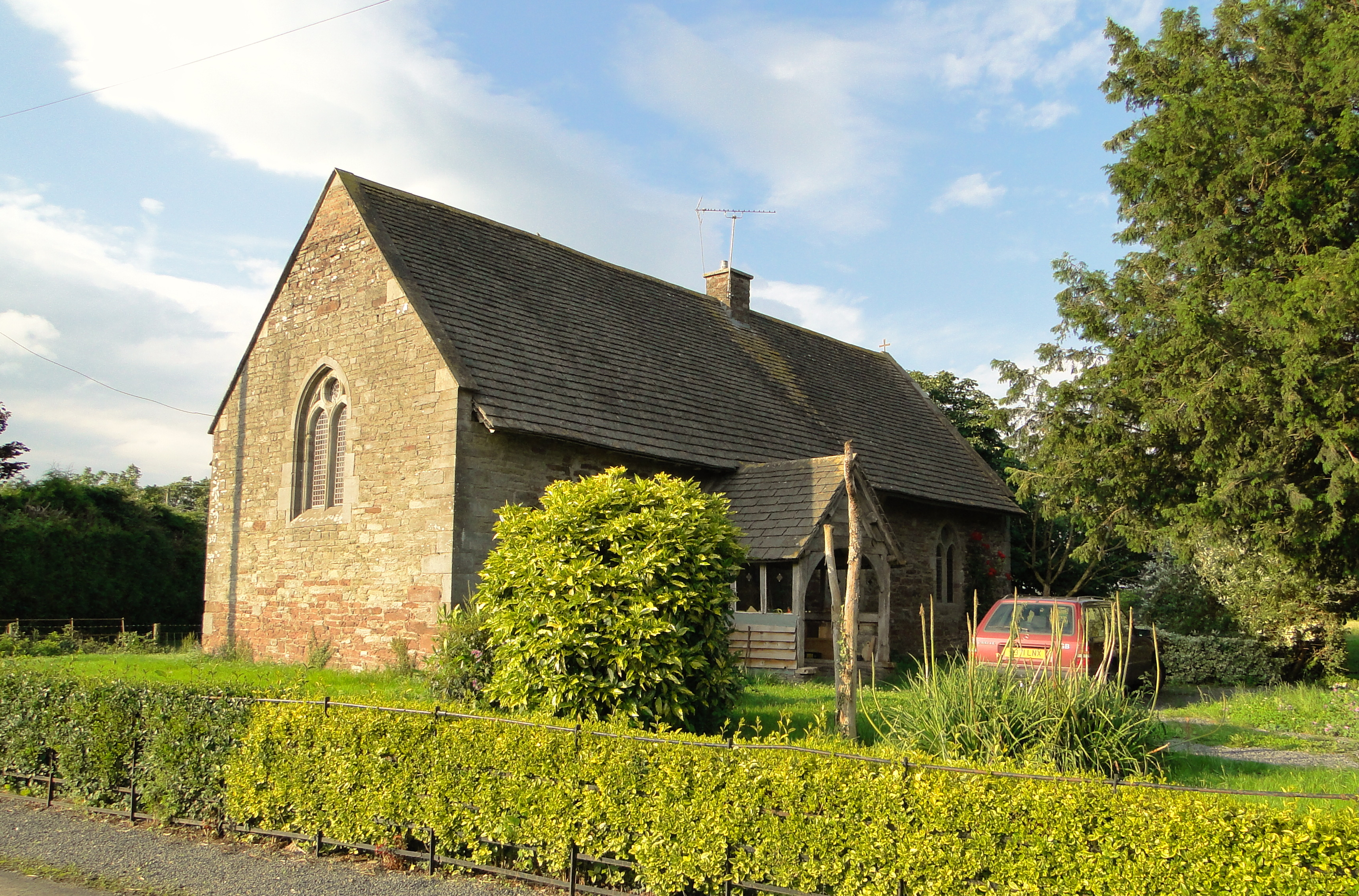
Magdalene House, Willersley

The former parish Church of St Mary Magdalene at Willersley (grid reference SO3120947371), from 1967 the now Grade II Magdalene House, dates to the mid- to late 12th century, and was probably altered in the 14th and 17th centuries, was restored in 1877 at which time the timber-framed south porch was added, and was converted to a private house in 1881, when the west bell turret was removed. Constructed with local sandstone and ashlar it comprises a former nave and chancel, with no chancel arch, under a 14th- or 15th-century continuous roofline. When operational the church had a west bell-Cot, while the interior included a communion table, an early 17th-century alter rail, three-panel reredos, and panelled pews, and floor memorial ledger slabs. The 14th- or 15th-century roof trussing has been retained.

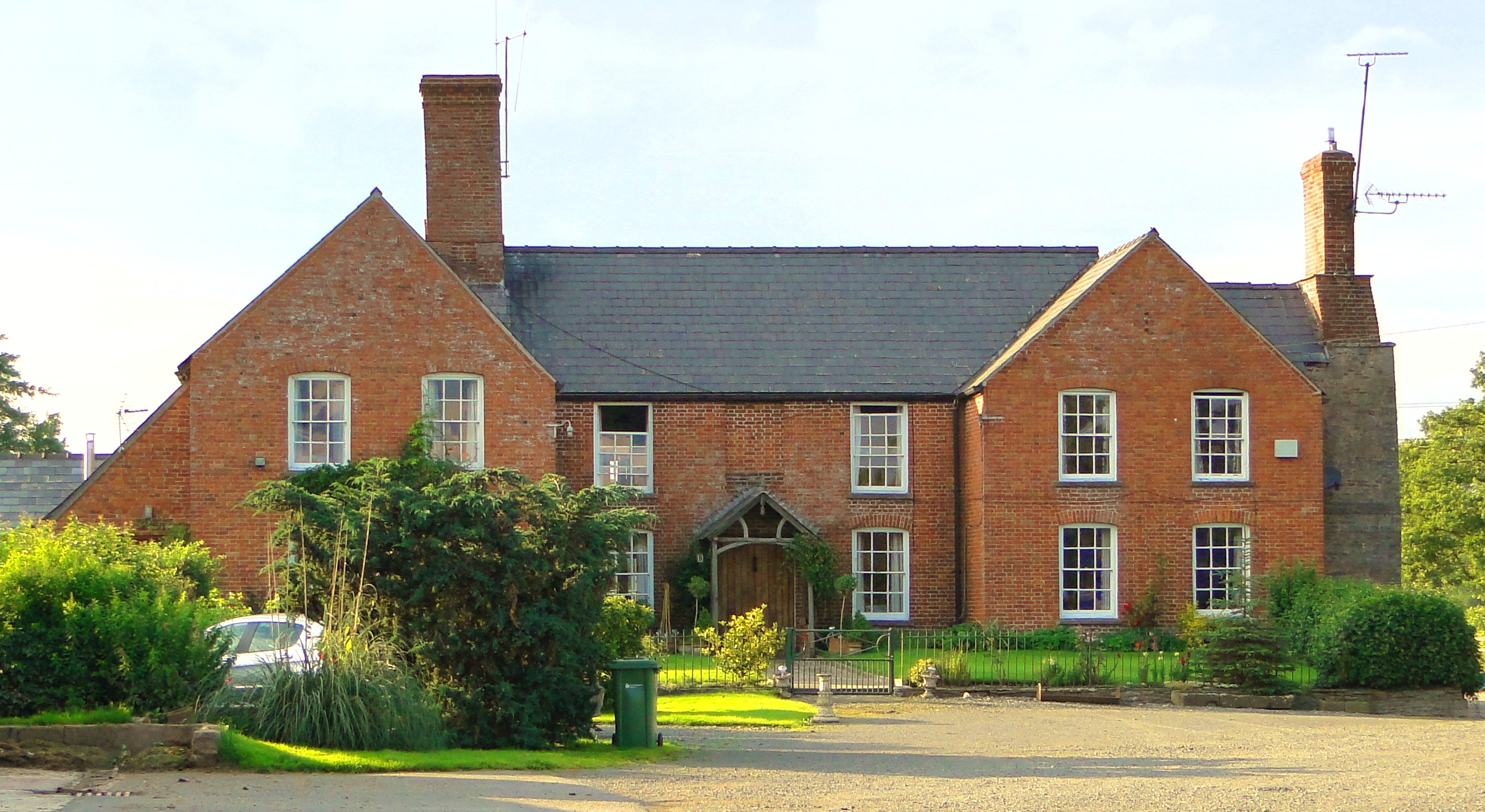
Willersley Court

The second Grade II* building is Willersley Court (grid reference SO3117547430), 70 yards (60 m) north from Magdalene House, a farmhouse dating to the early 16th century, with alterations in the mid-18th and mid-19th-century. Of H-plan with part-facing of 18th-century brick on the south side, it is constructed on timber-framing and a stone base, with a three-bay east-west cross hall with a two-bay gable at each end. It is of two storeys with tall a chimney stack at the west and east, and 12-pane sash windows. The main south entrance is through a 20th-century timber porch. The timber framing with brick infill is apparent on the north and west walls. The interior ground floor of the cross hall contains "original moulded ceiling-beams and joists", as has two rooms in the west wing where there is 17th-century panelling on the ground and first floor. Some panelling is Linenfold "cut out of the solid". Two fireplaces are early 18th-century with moulded surrounds. In 1934 there were reported an early 17th-century two-storey timber-framed outbuilding, and two timber-framed 17th-century barns at the south-east of the house.

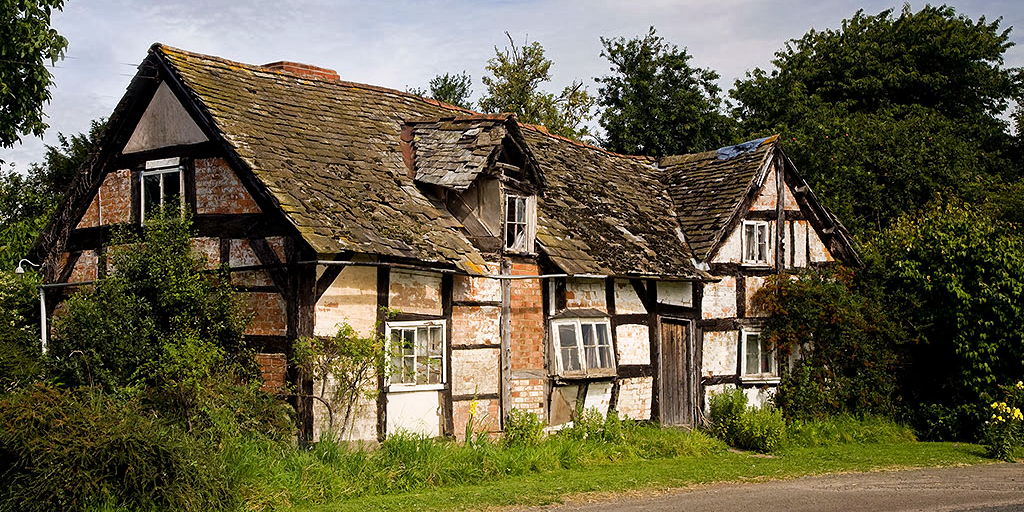
Old Crow Cottage

At 140 yards (130 m) east from Magdalen House, at the border with and just inside Eardisley, is Old Crow Cottage (grid reference SO3134047427), which dates to the 17th century, and is single-storeyed with attic, T-plan, and timber-framed with brick nogging, which is today rendered. The three-bay main range with gabled roof dormer, has a cross-wing gable at the north-east end. The main range contains a ground floor oriel window with hip roof, and a main door left of the cross gable. The original casement windows have been replaced with modern polypropylene construction, part of a rebuild and modernization of the property that began in 2015, following the death of the previous occupant in 2013 after which the cottage fell into further ruin. Old newspaper records dating to the second decade of the 19th century indicate the sale of the property and that it was once the public house Old Crow Inn. The cottage received press interest because of its history and the story surrounding its ruin.

Winforton Court (grid reference SO2963947001) is 250 yards (200 m) west from St Michael's church. It was originally a farmhouse, now a Grade II residential house, dating to the 16th century, partially rebuilt in the 17th, and altered in the 19th and 20th. It is of H-plan of cross hall with two gable wings, timber-framed with rendered infill, slate roofed, of two storeys and an attic, and an entrance porch set at the corner of the cross hall and east wing. In the interior are some exposed ceiling beams, and an early 17th-century staircase with "turned balusters, panelled risers, moulded rails, and square newels with moulded terminals". In 1934 was recorded to the west of the house a 17th-century timber-framed barn, a two-storeyed outbuilding, and a further barn to the south-west.

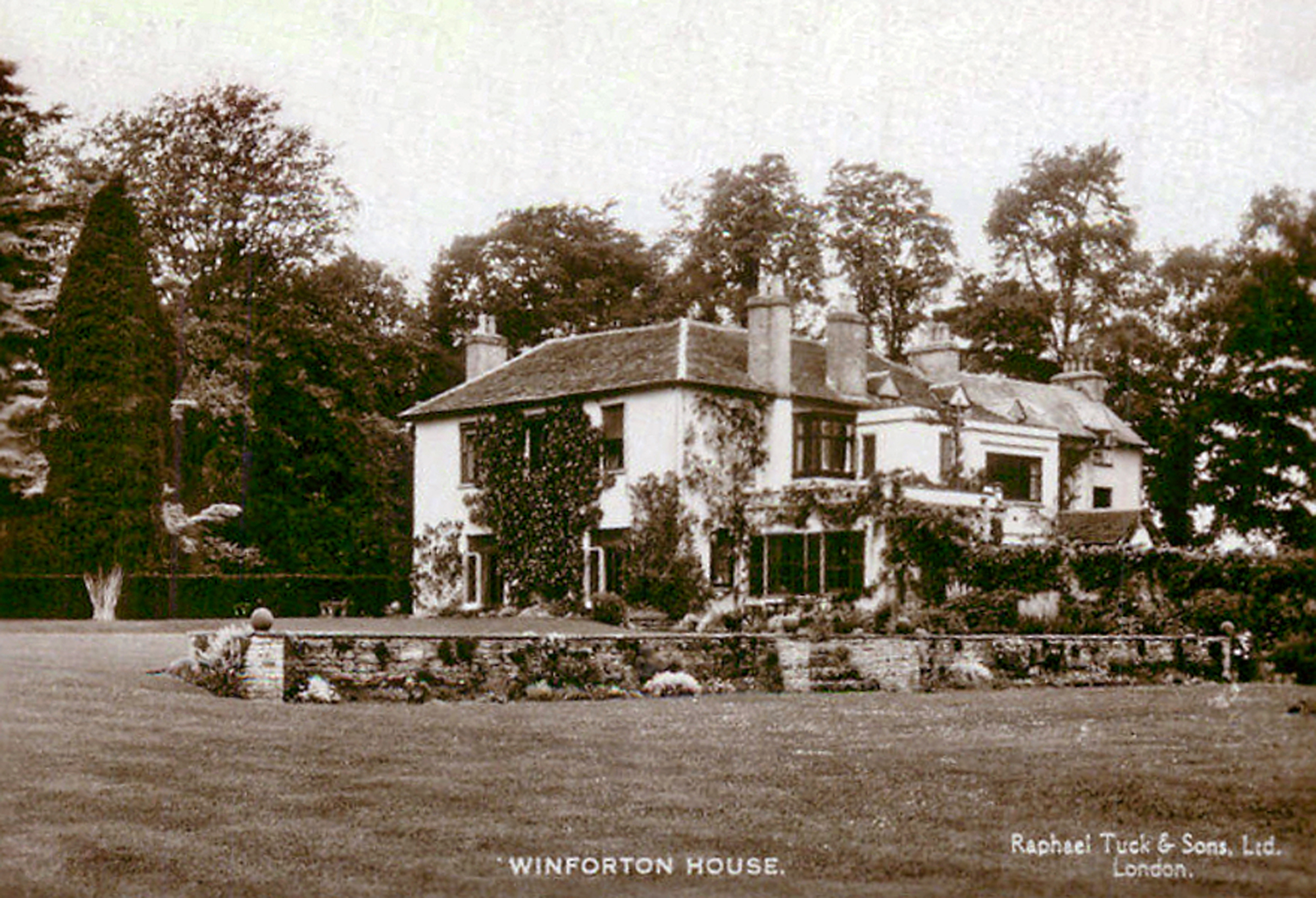
Winforton House

Winforton House (grid reference SO2998547252), is an unlisted Georgian property, remodelled with its landscaped grounds and kitchen garden in the 1920s by Michael Waterhouse, 250 yards (200 m) north from the A438 on Winforton Common Road. From 1923 the house was the home of Sir Thomas Ralph Merton (1888 – 1969), KBE, DSc, FRS, the physicist, Oxford professor, inventor and art collector. During and before the Second World War at Winforton, Merton entertained and worked with scientists and peers including Harold Hartley, Henry Tizard, Ronald Ross and Alfred Egerton, and the lords Cherwell, Berkeley and Rayleigh. Winston Churchill, and his wife Clementine, visited Winforton in 1935; Churchill and Merton shot game in Winforton Woods to the north. During the Second World War, while working for the Air Defence of Great Britain (ADGB), Merton's laboratory in the grounds of Winforton House was where he developed the radar screen which was instrumental in The Battle of Britain. For the Ministry of Supply he was the chairman of the Tribunal of Scientific Advisers, and was instrumental in developing the Barnes Wallis bouncing bomb.

To the north from Winforton House and estate, and on Winforton Common Road, is the ancient 10 acres (4.0 hectares) common land of Nicholas Common (grid reference SO296475), and farther north, Winforton Woods (grid reference SO292482). At Nicholas Common, an archeological site includes enclosures, ditches, and earthworks. At 350 yards (320 m) yards west from Nicholas Common (grid reference SO2926047600), is evidence of medieval ridge and furrow to a length of 275 yards (250 m), seen as earthworks. To the south of the A438 road (grid reference SO3096047180), and 320 yards (300 m) south-west from Magdalen House, is evidence of a possible Bronze Age round barrow seen as cropmarks.
