= Nicholas Devereux of Chanston =

Anglo-Norman nobleman (c.1196–1240)

- Born: circa 1196
- Died: circa 1240
- Issue: Nicholas II Devereux of Chanston; Thomas Devereux; Master Hugh Devereux; Master Robert Devereux
- Father: Walter Devereux (born 1173)

Nicholas Devereux of Chanston (Vowchurch) was an Anglo-Norman nobleman living during the reigns of John and Henry III of England. The Devereux were a prominent knightly family along the Welsh Marches during the thirteenth century, and Nicholas Devereux was a key member of the retinue of Walter de Lacy, Lord of Meath.

== Ancestry ==
Nicholas Devereux was born about 1196, the son of Walter Devereux and Cecilia de Longchamp. His father was a member of the retinue of William de Braose, 4th Lord of Bramber, and upon Walter's death about 1197 his estates were taken into de Braose's hands for the king. Following his death the Testa de Nevil listed Cecilia Devereux and her son Nicholas holding part of a fee in Chanston(e).

The sons of Walter and Cecilia Devereux were fostered for training as knights: Stephen Devereux with William Marshal, 1st Earl of Pembroke; John Devereux with William de Braose, 4th Lord of Bramber; and Nicholas Devereux, with Walter de Lacy, Lord of Meath. The three brothers would sire the three Devereux families that would play an integral role in controlling the Welsh Marches during the thirteenth century.

== Career ==
Nicholas Devereux joined the retinue of Walter de Lacy about 1205. De Lacy was the son-in-law of the William de Braose who was holding his father's estates for the king. In 1203, John granted custody of the city of Limerick to de Braose. and Walter de Lacy served as his deputy here. Over the next several years Walter de Lacy became involved in a conflict with Meiler Fitzhenry, Justiciar of Ireland, and by 1208 was solidifying his hold on Meath. Nicholas Devereux would spend his early years supporting his lord in Ireland.

During the summer of 1208 King John used William de Braose's escalating debt and refusal to provide a hostage, to seize his lands and order the arrest of his family. He fled to his friend, the earl of Pembroke, in Ireland. The king's men seized Braose's lands, and tracked him to Leinster. William Marshal denied knowledge of the charges against Braose, and refused to turn him over claiming he was under the protection of his hospitality. Braose was escorted to Meath where he took sanctuary with Walter de Lacy. The King seized Braose's lands, and replaced him as sheriff of Hereford with his mercenary commanders. Among the seized lands were the lands of the under-age Nicholas Devereux in Hereford. These were first given over to Walter de Lacy, but on discovering that Braose was in Meath, the king seized the de Lacy lands in Ireland, and placed the Devereux lands in Hereford in the hands of Miles Pichard. John brought a great army to Ireland, landing in county Waterford, and marching north. Upon reaching Dublin in late June 1210, Walter de Lacy attempted to throw himself on John's mercy, placing his lands in Meath back in the king's hand, and disclaiming any attempt to shelter his brother, Hugh, from John's wrath. Walter de Lacy's submission was accepted, but John would hold Walter's lands in Meath for five years. Hugh de Lacy was defeated, and fled to Scotland. William de Braose fled to France and died.

In the summer of 1211 a Welsh rebellion forced King John to redirect his attention to their suppression. His forces were further strained by the discovery of a plot to usurp the throne. As John's popularity plummeted following his failed expedition to Poitou in 1214, he attempted to secure support against the brewing revolt by negotiating the restoration to Walter de Lacy of his lands in Meath. Nicholas Devereux's loyalty to de Lacy throughout this period led to the restoration of his lands, and his appointment as the Steward of Meath in the 1220s. Devereux is one of the most frequent witnesses to Walter de Lacy's surviving documents.

Following the death of William Marshal on 14 May 1219, Nicholas Devereux's brother, Stephen, accepted a grant from Gilbert de Lacy of 12 virgates of land in the manor of Staunton-on-Wye (part of the honor of Weobley) to also bring him into the de Lacy retinue. Both Walter de Lacy and his son, Gilbert, witnessed and confirmed Stephen Devereux's extensive grants to Wormsley Priory.

In 1220 Walter de Lacy returned to Ireland and was heavily involved in the series of wars occurring there. During 1224 Hugh de Lacy attacked the lands held by the 2nd earl of Pembroke, and other royal demesne lands. William fitzWilliam Marshal returned to Ireland and subdued Hugh de Lacy, but by 1227 the earldom of Ulster had been restored to him. (Note: Nicholas Devereux’s son, Hugh Devereux, was probably named for Hugh de Lacy)

In 1230 Nicholas Devereux's brother, Sir John Devereux, witnessed the grant by Walter Clifford, son of Walter Clifford and Agnes Cundy, to Katherine, daughter of Walter de Lacy, of Burley held as part of the manor of Corfham. About this same time Nicholas Devereux witnessed the quitclaim of William de Aldon to Walter de Lacy of all his lands in Aldon, county Shropshire, in exchange for lands in Ireland.

Between 1230 and 1234 Walter de Lacy, Lord of Meath, granted lands to God and the church of St. Mary and St. Laurence, Beaubec, for the souls of himself, Margaret his wife, Gilbert de Lacy his son [died 1230], and his ancestors and successors. Nicholas Devereux witnessed this document. On 2 December the king issued a charter confirming the grant of Walter de Lacy.

On 16 April 1234, Walter de Lascy, lord of Meath, granted land in Mariners (near the port of Drogheda, Ireland) to God and the abbot and monks of St. Mary's, Furness (England) for the good of his soul and the souls of Marjory (his spouse), Hugh de Lascy (his father), Roays (his mother), Robert de Lascy (his brother), Gilbert (his son), and his ancestors and successors. Nicholas Devereux witnessed and instituted this grant on his behalf. In December 1236 Walter de Lacy made an additional grant of land in Mariners to the abbot and monks of St, Mary's, Furness, for the good of his soul and of the souls of Margery de Lacy (his spouse), Gilbert de Lacy (his son), his ancestors and successors. Nicholas Devereux witnessed this as well.

Nicholas Devereux died about 1240.

== Marriage ==
Nicholas Devereux married an unknown woman, and they had children:

- Nicholas II Devereux of Chanston (Note: Nicholas Devereux submitted a plea in October 1253 for relief against Walter Kingston whose armed men had destroyed his crops in Enlatheston (Chanston))
- probably Thomas Devereux (Note: Thomas Devereux received a grant on 30 May 1246 of 11 ½ acres assarted from the king’s demesne of Bozeat, county Northampton, and custody of the Hurnewude wood. He witnessed a charter of the Earl of Derby on 12 December 1251 manumitting men in Hecham, and a quitclaim by John Tropinel during the time of Henry III. In February 1263 a Thomas Devereux is on a list of fees of those wards and marriages due with relief for ½ fee in Stoke. This Thomas probably had a son of the same name, Thomas Devereux the younger, and probably was the Thomas Devereux who Simon Ban was pardoned for killing in self-defense on 7 June 1293. Bozeat passed out of the family, and was granted in mortmain by John de Stokes on 26 November 1325.)
- Master Hugh Devereux (Note: In 1281 a fine was executed between Master Hugh Devereux and his cousin, Simon Devereux, regarding rents in Staundon and Humber in Herefordshire.)
- Master Robert Devereux (Note: Robert Devereux entered the clergy. He was appointed as the attorney of Richard de Clare, Earl of Hertford and Gloucester, in the matter of a contested debt with a Jewish moneylender, Samuel son of Isaac, during Easter 1244. He later witnessed Richard de Clare's grant to the church in Saint Mary's, Bruern, that included lands in Eastleach and Burton. The Devereux family had also made donations to this church from these locations.)

== General references ==
- Asbridge, Thomas. The Greatest Knight. (New York: HarperCollins, 2014)
- Holden, Brock. "Lords of the Central Marches: English Aristocracy and Frontier Society, 1087-1265." (Oxford: Oxford University Press, 2008).
- Redmond, Gabriel O'C. "An Account of the Anglo-Norman Family of Devereux, of Balmagir, County Wexford." (Dublin: Office of "The Irish Builder," 1891).
- Robinson, Charles J. A History of the Castles of Herefordshire and their Lords. (Great Britain; Antony Rowe LTD, 2002). Page 125-129
- Roche, Richard. The Norman Invasion of Ireland. (Dublin; Anvil Books, 1995)
