= Stephen Devereux =

English nobleman

- Born: circa 1191
- Died: 1228
- Spouse: Isabel de Cantilupe
- Issue: William Devereux; Unknown Daughter; Margaret Devereux; Philip Devereux
- Father: Walter Devereux
- Mother: Cecilia de Longchamp

Stephen Devereux (c. 1191 – 1228) was a powerful Marcher Lord, and held Lyonshall Castle controlling an important approach to the border of Wales. As a key member of the retinue of William Marshal, 1st Earl of Pembroke, he played a significant role in the Earl's support of King John during the First Barons' War, and during the minority of Henry III.

== Birth and ancestry ==
Stephen Devereux was born about 1191, the eldest of three sons of Walter Devereux and Cecilia de Longchamp. Cecilia was the daughter of Sir Hugh de Longchamp and sister to William de Longchamp, Lord Chancellor of England. His father, Walter, died in 1197, probably during the assault on the castle at Milly-sur-Thérain in France since he was in the retinue of William de Braose, 4th Lord of Bramber. Braose was with Richard I as he campaigned to regain his territories lost while Richard was held captive by Leopold of Austria. Walter Devereux's lands passed into the King's hands. His sons were placed in the retinue of local lords for training as knights: Stephen Devereux with William Marshal, earl of Pembroke; (Note: Stephen Devereux is referred to as William Marshal's 'cousin.' In this context it indicates as belonging to the same extended family) Nicholas Devereux with Walter de Lacy, Lord of Meath; (Note: Nicholas Devereux would eventually become the Steward of Meath for Walter de Lacy, and inherit the Devereux manors of Chanston (Hereford) and East Leach (Gloucester).) and John Devereux with William de Braose. (Note: John Devereux would be granted the Decies (county Waterford). When William de Braose eventually fell out of favor with King John in 2010, John Devereux became part of the retinue of William Marshall with his brother, Stephen.) Stephen's mother, Cecilia, launched a series of legal fights to preserve her dower rights and the Devereux properties. (Note: Two examples: Curia Regis Roll: Michaelmas Term, 9 John 1207. Cicely Devereux was fined 3 marks for mercy in the suit over Putley. The matter was eventually settled when the canons produced the charter that William Devereux had conferred on them, and demonstrated they had possessed the right of patronage for the previous 60 years. An arrangement was made where Cecilia released her own claims and the future rights of her heirs and assigns in the contested portion of the advowson, for which concession she was paid eight marks of silver with the privilege of having her obit celebrated in the Cathedral at the annual thanksgiving to benefactors. Curia Regis Roll: Michaelmas Term, 13 John, 1211, Membrane 6, Page 144. Gloucester— Cecilia Devereux seeks against William de Lechlade six and a half hides of land and 6 acres of land with the appurtenances in Lech (Leach) as her right and inheritance. And so William Devereux, the grandfather of the aforesaid Cicely, was seised in the time of King Henry the Lord's father, etc. And William comes and defends his right to hold in the Lord's name, and he puts forward his great assize of the Lord King and seeks to have his seisin recognized, as is aforesaid, whether he should have the greater right of holding than Cicely the land of William Devereux, her grandfather and by whom she herself stakes her claim of the land, he (William Devereux) gave his mother, Orenge. Cicely received a marriage-portion to hold of him if she held this in the Lord's name. Day is given them on the octave of St. Martin, and then come the fourth. etc.)

== Career ==
About 1199, Stephen Devereux was placed in the retinue of William Marshal for training as a knight, and over the years came ‘to be trusted for his cool-headed judgement’ and a member of the earl's inner circle. In spring 1201, King Philip II of France began to confiscate England's possessions in France. In May, Devereux accompanied William Marshal to Normandy with 100 knights to counter a French invasion. King John abandoned Normandy in December 1203. Marshal tried to retain his Normandy estates at Longueville, and paid homage to King Philip for this purpose. This led to Marshal's falling out of favour with King John that festered over the next few years. In 1205, Stephen Devereux's uncle and namesake, Stephen de Longchamp, granted him the manor of Frome Herbert (Halmond) with King John confirming it on 26 July. This probably was an attempt by John to subvert the loyalty of Stephen to William Marshal.

Against the king's wishes, William Marshal and Devereux traveled in early 1207 to Ireland to secure the earl's lands and title to Leinster. In late summer, John summoned Marshal to return to England. Marshal held council with his wife and leading men, including Stephen, and all believed the summons to be a trick to allow the Justiciar of Ireland, Meiler FitzHenry, to seize key fortresses and drive Marshal from Ireland. Marshal decided to comply with the summons, but only bring 2 knights of his retinue with him: John Marshal and Henry Hose. The earl prepared his defenses, assigning John of Earley as guardian of south-west Leinster (Ossory, including county Kilkenny and Wexford) with Stephen Devereux to advise him, and Jordan of Sauqueville as guardian of north-east Leinster (Carlow, Wicklow, and Kildare).

William Marshal arrived in Wales in late 1207, and in his absence from Ireland the king's Justiciar launched assaults on his lands across Leinster. In England, Marshal arrived at court to find that King John had bought off his allies with lands and offices, and he was isolated and unable to determine the state of his lands in Ireland. The Justiciar delivered three letters in January 1208 summoning John of Earley, Jordan de Saqueville, and Stephen Devereux to appear before the king in England within 15 days, or suffer the loss of all their lands. The three decided to stand fast for their lord, William Marshal, and sent to seek aid from Hugh de Lacy, 1st Earl of Ulster, to resist the forces assaulting them. According to the History of William Marshal Stephen Devereux said that "The king might do as he pleased with their English lands, rather than they be shamed before God in giving up their charges;" and together they said "Let us not complain of the game if we lose land and honour; better that than to lose land, honour and the love of our lord."

On 20 February 1208, King John sent a letter to Marshal telling him "I want you to know that I have delivered to you the lands I confiscated from John of Early, which he held from you. I took away his lands because more than two months ago I instructed him to come to me and he did not do so. I very much want you to produce both him and the others I summoned before me, as is right and proper. I need them here for my own business, and I will keep their lands until they surrender to me." Shortly afterward, John told William Marshal that his pregnant wife was besieged in Kilkenny castle, and that a bloody battle had been fought there causing the death of Stephen Devereux and John of Earley. The truth came out a few weeks later. Marshal's forces were victorious, and this prompted a reconciliation with King John. William Marshal rewarded his loyal knights with lands, and Devereux received the castles of Balmagir and Selskar in county Wexford. (Note: A pedigree of the Devereux of Ballybarne (Kilrush), County Wexford, indicates their family descended from the ‘ancient family of Devereux of Balmagir in that county, who settled there in the reign of King John’ (1199-1216))

By the summer of 1208, William de Braose, 4th Lord of Bramber, had fallen out of favour with King John and fled to his friend, William Marshal in Ireland. The king's men seized Braose's lands, and tracked him to Leinster. Marshal denied knowledge of the charges against Braose, and refused to turn him over claiming he was under the protection of his hospitality. Braose was escorted to Meath where he took sanctuary with Walter de Lacy. John seized Braose's lands, and replaced him as sheriff of Hereford with his mercenary commanders. Among these lands were the estates of the Stephen Devereux including his castle at Lyonshall, Hereford. This at first was given over to Walter de Lacy who placed Lyonshall in the hands of Miles Pichard, but on discovering that Braose was in Meath, the king seized the de Lacy lands in Ireland. John raised a great army to bring to Ireland, and William Marshal rushed to England to renew his submission and vow no further support for de Braose. John's force landed in Waterford, and marched north. Walter de Lacy submitted, but his brother Hugh de Lacy resisted and was defeated. Hugh de Lacy fled to Scotland, and William de Braose fled to France and died. William Marshal was again in disfavor, and the king's wrath fell also on his followers. John of Earley, Jordan of Saqueville, and Geoffrey of Saqueville were imprisoned, and Devereux found all his estates back in the king's hands.

The next year brought uprisings in Wales, and increasing unrest among England's barons at the poor rule of King John. Marshal seized this opportunity to make a gesture of support for the king, prompting the release of his men and restoration of Stephen Devereux's estates. As John's popularity plummeted, Marshal and his knights bolstered the king's forces, helping to stabilize the situation. Stephen was rewarded with 4 marks of scutage by King John in 1211, and two fees held of the Bishops of Worcester and Winchester in 1214. Walter de Lacy released ½ knight's fee in the manor of Haymonds Frome (Frome Halmond) to Stephen d’Ebroicis. (Note: Later there was the following entry in the Book of Fees during the time of Henry III referring to an earlier charter involving lands held by his widow: “In the manor of Frome Haymond which contains four hides, Isabel Devereux holds from the Honor of Weobley from old; and the four hides formerly were responsible for one knight fee, and through this charter, Walter de Lacy releases Stephen Devereux from one half fee.”)

Stephen Devereux participated in the King's expedition to Poitou in France during the first part of 1214, and is present for the conquest of Anjou and the final withdrawal following the Battle of Bouvines. King John was forced to offer tax concessions to induce participation, but many leading barons refused to become involved directly, choosing to send proxies instead. It is probable that Stephen served in this role for the Marshal. His reward included instructions to the royal forester, Hugh de Neville, to measure 40 acres at his manor of Crowle in the royal forest of Feckenham for assarting (clearance for agriculture) in accord with the license the King had granted Stephen. The Pipe Roll of Michaelmas 1214 recorded Stephen Devereux as owing 6 dogs for obtaining an order from the king. On 2 August 1222 a writ was sent to the sheriff of Worcestershire involving Crowle. The order showed that Crowle had been given to the Prior of Wormsley by Stephen, but his original grant was being called into question. In 1224, Stephen's position was strong enough to point out to the government that the 40 acres of assart granted him at Crowle were to be placed outside the regard, and they were for the three years. (Note: After his death there is reference on 30 December 1232 (Calendar of Charter Rolls, Tewkesbury, membrane 12) to an exception in the “Grant to the hospital of St. Wulstan, Worcester, without the gate of Suthbiri, and the brethren there, or the following gifts: … of the gift of Stephen de Ebroicis, the patronage of the church of Croul…”)

Stephen also served with William le Gras (Note: Lord of Grace Castle in Kilkenny, and brother-in-law of William Marshall) as the Marshall's attorney in a suit in 1214 involving the (St. Mary's) Abbey in Ferns, Wexford. This reflected the ongoing dispute between Marshal and Albinus, Bishop of Ferns, which would drag on for the remainder of his life. With John's failures in France, unrest swept England again, and the First Barons’ War broke out. William Marshall and Stephen Devereux stood firm with the King, and were deeply involved in the negotiations resulting in Magna Carta, which John signed at Runnymede on 15 June 1215. On 4 July 1215 King John wrote in a royal writ describing Stephen as ‘our dear and faithful’ when ordering a quittance of an annual render to Hereford Castle of 32 gallons of honey from Devereux's manor of Ballingham. Stephen Devereux was further rewarded with many holdings forfeited by the rebels: Ballingham and Clehonger in Herefordshire (27 Jan 1216), (Note: Forfeited by Walter de Stokes) land in Stanton, Worcestershire (30 July 1216), (Note: Forfeited by Peter of Stanton) and lands at Rotherwas (1219). (Note: Forfeited by Peter of Welles)

As the king worked to reverse Magna Carta, England again plunged into civil war. William Marshal and Stephen Devereux remained faithful to the King, but at the time of John's death on 18 October 1216 two thirds of England was in open rebellion and a French army had landed at Sandwich, county Kent, to support the claim of their Prince (who became Louis VIII of France) to the throne. As William Marshal attended to the burial of John, he sent his men to secure John's son, Henry III. On 28 October 1216, Marshal had a heated debate with his retinue, including Stephen Devereux, and the decision was to support Henry's claim to the throne. William Marshal was appointed Guardian of the Realm, and Devereux was placed on the regency council entrusted with protecting the king during his minority. Moving quickly, the royalists regained the initiative, and support began to flow back to Henry. Stephen Devereux was probably with Marshal at the Battle of Lincoln on 20 May 1217 when the baronial rebels were soundly defeated. The French claimant, Prince Louis, was forced to break off his siege of Dover, and following the destruction of his reinforcements at the naval battle of Sandwich on 24 August 1217, abandoned England and his claim to the throne.

Over the next year, Devereux actively assisted Marshal in bringing order to the realm, and was among the earl's knights to stand vigil as Marshal's health failed. Stephen was one of the retinue given a fine, fur trimmed scarlet robe as a token of his esteem. It was to Stephen Devereux that William Marshal had entrusted 2 lengths of silken cloth obtained in Jerusalem, now sent for to use as his funeral shroud. William Marshal died on 14 May 1219, and was laid to rest in the Temple Church in London.

In June 1219, Stephen Devereux was assigned as inquisitor along with William Cantilupe Senior, Walter Muscegros, Gilbert Talbot, and Hugh Rigal (clerk) with instructions to travel through Hereford County reviewing the use of land, and insuring that all was being done by grant of the king. He was also appointed a forest commissioner for the Eyre in Hereford. The following year Stephen was appointed a justice of gaol delivery for Hereford (Note: Curia Regis Roll: Trinity Term, 4 Henry III, 1220, May 22, Membrane 28, page 198. Pleas of the Crown ‘gaolis’ Hereford deliberating before the M. de Pateshull, Stephen De Evreux dissesisin, new assize, and like manner and his associates, etc. the fourth year of the reign of King Henry, son of John.)

During 1219, Devereux confirmed the grant of his father and himself of the church of Lyonshall to the canons of Pyon, and expressed his regret that the urgency of his affairs prevented him from tendering his gift in person. To secure his position in Hereford, Stephen Devereux accepted a grant from Gilbert de Lacy of 12 virgates of land in the manor of Stanton Lacy for which Stephen “should be in my familia” or military retinue. Both Walter and Gilbert de Lacy witnessed and confirmed Stephen's further extensive grants to Wormsley Priory about 1220, (Note: Stephen Devereux's brother, John, witnessed his grants.) which were valued at 83 pounds 10 shillings 2 pence annually. The majority of the lands were located near Kings Pyon about 7 miles south-east of Lyonshall. Stephen granted the mill at Lyonshall with the raw materials to support it from his manor; pigs from the woods of Lyonshall; land in that area and in Halmond's Frome near their mill; a portion of the annual rents of Lyonshall, Frome, and Stokes; pasture in his manner of Cheddrehole; and salt from his manor at Crowle. (Note: As described above Crowle was in the hands of the Priors before 1224) In this grant there is also mention of his wife, Isabel, and mother, ‘the widow Cecilia’ (who was holding some of the lands involved in the grant). On 20 February 1223, Prior Ralph of Wormsley promised not to alienate or sell any of the lands or possessions which they held of the gift of Stephen Devereux without his assent.

In 1221, Stephen had a dispute with the Canon of Hereford, M. William de Ria, over a weir in the River Wye in Hereford. This extended into October 1222 when Stephen was also involved in further litigation against William, Archdeacon of Hereford. Devereux had further litigation in August 1221 against Isabel, Aldith, and Cecily, daughters of Simon Bocha, in a plea of assize of mort d’ancestor by Gerard le Pele. Also in October 1221, Stephen Devereux was in court over a plea of land in Gloucester with the Master of the Knight's Templar of England.

In 1223, he participated in a military expedition again the Welsh. For this service he had scutage of all his tenants in the counties of Gloucester and Hereford, who held of him by military service. On 27 April 1223, an order from the Court at St. Albans to the sheriffs of Essex and Hertfordshire caused demanded that the Stephen make several scutages from his land of Trumpington to be placed in respite until upon his next account. In 1225, he helped escort the collected fifteenth for that year from Hereford to Gloucester, and on 4 June 1227 he was granted a weekly market and yearly fair at Lyonshall in perpetuity.

In 1227, the 2nd Earl of Pembroke, William fitzWilliam Marshal, solidified their alliance with the grant to Devereux of Wilby Manor in Norfolk. The King confirmed this on 4 June 1227. (Note: Calendar of Charter Rolls, Merton, membrane 8: as “Grant to Stephen de Ebroicis of all the land of Wyleby which he has of the gift of William Marshall, Earl of Penbroch, pursuant to a charter of the said Earl.”) Stephen Devereux had previously purchased part of a carucate of land from Walter Giffard at Banham, part of Wilby, and the rest of the manor had been sold to the Marshalls. Devereux was granted a fair and market at Banham on St. Barnabas' day (June 11).

== Marriage ==
About 1208, William Marshal directed his attention to arranging marriage alliances for his children. He did the same in 1209 when he arranged Stephen Devereux's marriage to Isabel de Cantilupe, daughter of William de Cantilupe Sheriff of Herefordshire and his wife, Mazilia Braci. She was also the aunt of Thomas de Cantilupe, Bishop of Hereford. They would go on to have children:

- Unknown Daughter (born ~1213) (Note: On May 2, 1234 (Reading, Close, 18 Hen III, membrane 25) indicates that as Walter de Lacy was on the King’s service in Ireland, the Sheriff of Hereford was commanded to respite till the Quizaine of Michaelmas the plaint in his county by the King’s writ between Walter de Baskerville, complainant, and the said Walter deforcient, touching the daughters of Stephen D’Evreux.)
- Margaret Devereux (born ~1216). She married Alexander Redmond of The Hall. (Note: The ancient latin pedigree of the family records: Dominus Alexander de Redmond de Aula eques qui obiit AD 1285, nupt. fuit a Margareta filia Domini Stephani Devereux de Ballymaguir in Comitatu Wexfordensi equities. Alexander Redmond was a descendant of Raymond FitzGerald, brother in law of Richard de Clare, 2nd Earl of Pembroke)
- William Devereux (born 1219) who was his heir, and probably named in honor of William Marshal who died this year.
- Philip Devereux, knight of Balmagir (born ~1221) (Note: A pedigree of the Devereux of Carigmenan, County Wexford (held in the National Archives in Dublin) was headed by Philip Devereux with written annotation indicating he came to Ireland in 1232. He may have been named for Stephen Devereux’s fellow knight in the retinue of William Marshal, Philip of Prendergast.)

Following Stephen Devereux's death Isabel Cantilupe married a second time to Richard Penebruge, and survived him as well.

== Principal landholdings ==
Stephen Devereux's principal seat was at Lyonshall Castle in Hereford. His manors included Ballingham, Frome Halmond (Herbert), Stoke Lacy, Holme Lacy, La Fenne (Bodenham), and Whitchurch maund in Herefordshire; Cheddrehole (Cheddar) in Somerset; Lower Hayton in Salop; and Wilby in Norfolk. Additional lands included Clehonger, and Staunton-on-Wye in Herefordshire; Crowle in the Royal Forest of Feckham, and Staunton in Worcester; Guiting and Oxenhall in Gloucestershire; Trumpington in Cambridgeshire: and Bosnormand (Eure) in the Évreçin, Normandy. Oxenhall, Trumpington, Frome Halmond and Whitchurch maund were held by Isabel de Cantilupe in dower until her death.

== Death ==
Stephen Devereux died on 17 Mar 1228. His wife Isabel survived him, and married a second time to Ralph de Penbrugge (between 1230 and 1242). On 17 March 1228 from the Court at Windsor a writ concerning lands to be taken into the King's hand. Order to the sheriff of Herefordshire that, immediately after having viewed these letters, he is to take into the King's hand the land that Stephen d’Évreux held of the King in chief near to Gillow and all other lands that he held in his bailiwick, and to keep them safely until the King is certain to whom the custody of the aforesaid lands pertains, whether to the King or to another.

In March 1228 the King issued a writ instructing the sheriff of Hereford to release the lands of Isabel Cantilupe's dower that had been taken into his hands by the order of the king on Stephen's death. On 21 February 1244, the king provided a further writ specifically restoring to her the manor of Frome Herbert (Frome Halmond), which was held in dower as part of the barony of Walter de Lacy. On 3 April 1228 the king further clarified that the sheriff was to take into his possession certain lands that Stephen held by fee of Gilbert de Lacy.

In 1242, Isabel Devereux held in Magene Album (Whitchurch maund in the parish of Bodenham) of the Honor of Weobley 2 hides from Roger Pichard by knight's service in the Hundred of Brokesesse in Hereford. On 21 February 1244 his widow, gave to the Hospital of St. Ethelbert for the souls of herself and her two husbands "unam ladum bladi" at the Feast of St. Andrew during her life to be received at her house in Frome. This Deed has a seal of white wax with the arms of Devereux and around it "Sigillum Isabell +" and was witnessed by Hugh de Kilpeck, John de Ebroicis, and Richard de Chandos. The arms of Devereux was described as "a fess and in chief three torteauxes."

== Biographical References ==
- Holden, Brock. "Lords of the Central Marches: English Aristocracy and Frontier Society, 1087-1265." (Oxford: Oxford University Press, 2008). Pages 46 to 136
- Brydges, Sir Egerton. "Collins's Peerage of England; Genealogical, Biographical, and Historical. Greatly Augmented, and Continued to the Present Time." (London: F.C. and J. Rivington, Otridge and Son; J. Nichols and Co.; T. Payne, Wilkie and Robinson; J. Walker, Clarke and Sons; W. Lowndes, R. Lea, J. Cuthell, Longman, Hurst, Rees, Orme, and Co.; White, Cochrane, and Co.; C. Law, Cadell and Davies; J. Booth, Crosby and Co.; J. Murray, J. Mawman, J. Booker, R. Scholey, J. Hatchard, R. Baldwin, Craddock and Joy; J. Fauldner, Gale, Curtis and Co.; Johnson and Co.; and G. Robinson, 1812). Volume VI, pages 1 to 22, Devereux, Viscount Hereford
- Burke, Sir Bernard. A Genealogical History of the Dormant, Abeyant, Forfeited, and Extinct Peerages of the British Empire. (Baltimore: Genealogical Publishing Co., 1978). page 169, Devereux-Barons Devereux
- Cokayne, G.E. Complete Baronetage. (New York; St. Martin's Press, 1984). Volume IV, page 296 to 302, Devereux or Deverose (article by G.W. Watson)
- Duncumb, John. "Collections Towards the History and Antiquities of the County of Hereford." (Hereford: E.G. Wright, 1812). Part I of Volume II, pages36 to 41, 166 to 168, Broxash Hundred
- Meyer, Paul. “L’Histoire de Guillaume le Marechal, Comte de Striguil et de Pembroke, Regent D’Angleterre de 1216 a 1219.” (Paris: Libraire de la Societe de l’Histoire de France, 1891)
- Redmond, Gabriel O'C. "An Account of the Anglo-Norman Family of Devereux, of Balmagir, County Wexford." (Dublin: Office of "The Irish Builder," 1891). Pages 1 to 5
- Robinson, Charles J. "A History of the Castles of Herefordshire and their Lords." (Woonton: Logaston Press, 2002). pages 125 to 129, Lyonshall Castle

== Specific References ==
Preceded by Walter Devereux	Lord of Lyonshall; 1197–1228	Succeeded by William Devereux
