= Thomas Ralph Merton =

British physicist

Sir Thomas Ralph Merton KBE, DSc, FRS (12 January 1888 – 10 October 1969) was an English physicist, inventor and art collector. He is particularly noted for his work on spectroscopy and diffraction gratings.

== Early life and education ==
Born in Wimbledon, Surrey, Thomas Ralph Merton was the only son of Emile Ralph Merton and Helen, daughter of Thomas Meates, a descendant of Sir Thomas Meutas, Secretary to Sir Francis Bacon. Emile Merton was for a time in the family metal trading business as a partner in Henry R. Merton & Co. which was started in London by his eldest brother in 1860. Another brother William Ralph Merton founded the Metallgesellschaft in Frankfurt-am-Main in 1881, which became the second largest company in Germany and the largest non-ferrous mining company in the world. The two companies worked closely with one another, along with the American Metal Company in New York City.

Thomas was educated at Farnborough School and Eton College, where Dr T. C. Porter, the physics master, encouraged him to begin research. Between leaving Eton in 1905 and going up to Balliol College, Oxford, in 1906, he worked at King's College London. He went to Balliol with distinguished fellow Etonians Julian Grenfell, Ronald Knox, and Julian Huxley.

In view of his delicate health and his promise as a scientist, Oxford allowed Merton to go straight to a research thesis without taking his final exams; this was an unusual privilege. His investigation of the properties of solutions of caesium nitrate earned him a BSc in 1910. Meanwhile, he had been reading widely and conceived many ideas for improving the techniques of spectroscopy. While still a schoolboy he had set up a room in his father's house as a primitive laboratory.

In 1912, he married (Violet) Marjory, daughter of Lt.-Colonel W. H. Sawyer, and moved – with his laboratory in tow – to his London house on Gilbert Street. Their partnership lasted for 57 years, during which they were never separated for more than a few days.

== Spectroscopy research: 1913–1928 ==
After 1913, a steady stream of papers came from Merton's private laboratory, in which he assembled the latest spectroscopic equipment. His early work was on the absorption spectra of solutions, but he soon changed to the spectra of gases and to astrophysics, which were to be the main fields of his investigations. His early papers were distinguished by the beauty and accuracy of his experimental techniques. In 1916, he obtained his DSc from Oxford and was appointed lecturer in spectroscopy at King's College London. In the same year his first joint paper with his friend J. W. Nicholson appeared. It was a fortunate chance which brought together Nicholson's brilliant mathematical analysis and Merton's experimental skill. The paper dealt with the broadening of spectral lines in a condensed discharge. By an ingenious technique Merton measured the discontinuities in the lines due to their partial breaking up into components under the influence of the magnetic field between adjacent atoms. The two men applied the same technique to the measurement of the spectra of hydrogen and helium, reproducing the distribution of intensity of some stellar lines in the laboratory for the first time.

In 1919, Balliol elected Merton to a research fellowship and Oxford made him reader (from 1923 professor) in spectroscopy. He worked on a series of problems, usually with a young student as his assistant. He was elected to the Royal Society in 1920 and in 1922, with Sydney Baratt, gave the society's Bakerian lecture, on the spectrum of hydrogen. They cleared up a number of discrepancies in the secondary spectrum of hydrogen which were shown to be due to the hydrogen molecule, and they also showed the profound influence that traces of impurities can exert on gas spectra. In 1923 Merton left Oxford to live at Winforton House in Herefordshire, the estate he had acquired with 3 miles of salmon fishing on the Wye. He was a good shot and a most skilful fisherman. He transferred his laboratory to Winforton, so that he was able to combine a sporting life with his scientific research.

== The First 'Q' in MI6 ==
The First World War scarcely interrupted his research activity. Having been rejected for active service on grounds of health, he was commissioned in 1916 as a lieutenant in the Royal Naval Volunteer Reserve. In 1915, he was handpicked by Sir Mansfield Smith-Cumming to work for MI6, the first such scientist to be appointed by the newly created organisation. He conducted various ink experiments with many different chemical solutions, including potassium permanganate, antipyrine and sodium nitrate. Spies were also advised to make invisible ink from semen. However, this was eventually abandoned because of complaints about the smell from those receiving the letters. His success in identifying the secret ink carried by German spies in their clothing, and inventing a new means of secret writing, won a mention in dispatches.

== Contribution to diffraction gratings ==
There is a gap of nearly twenty years between Merton's scientific papers of 1928 and 1947. In this interval he was busy in the laboratory and was taking out patents for his inventions. Diffraction gratings were one of his lifelong interests and here his inventive genius best showed itself. The rarity and expense of good diffraction gratings led him to devise, in 1935, a method of copying them without loss of optical quality, by applying a thin layer of a cellulose ester solution to an original plane grating. When the solvent had evaporated he detached this pellicle and applied its grooved surface to a moist gelatine film on a glass plate. When dry, the gelatine bore a faithful record of the original rulings.

In 1948, Merton made an important basic advance in the art of ruling diffraction gratings. Since 1880 these had been ruled groove by groove by the method used by Rowlands. In place of this, Merton ruled a very fine helix continuously on a steel cylinder which he then opened out upon a plane gelatine-coated surface by his copying method. No lathe could, however, rule a helix free from errors of pitch and these Merton eliminated by an ingenious device. It consisted of a 'chasing lathe' by which he cut a secondary helix on the same cylinder with a tool mounted on a 'Merton nut' lined with strips of cork pressed upon the primary lathe-cut helix. Periodic errors were thus averaged and eliminated by the elasticity of the cork.

Merton handed these processes over to the National Physical Laboratory (NPL) for further development and they formed the basis of a considerable research programme. The ‘blazed’ gratings made by the Merton–NPL method were of great value in making available cheap infra-red spectrometers of high resolving power for research and industry, while long gratings ruled by this method came into use for engineering measurement and machine tool control.

== Experiments with cathode rays ==
In the laboratory at his father's house Merton had bombarded various newly discovered phosphorescent powders with cathode rays. He was surprised to find that while all lit brilliantly, the afterglow was brief and feeble. By experiment, he discovered that this was because the excitation and emission lines of the spectra barely overlapped, and that by mixing suitable powders he could increase the afterglow. He realized that persistent afterglow could be got by a double layer of powders, in which the light emitted by the back layer excited the front layer, but as this technique seemed to have no practical use he forgot about it for thirty-three years, until 1938 when Sir Henry Tizard asked if he could achieve such a long afterglow. Merton was able to reply by return of post, and soon after was asked to join the air defence committee where he learned that his discovery had made possible the two-layer long-persistence radar screens which helped to bring victory in the Battle of Britain.

His other wartime inventions included a black paint which reduced the proportion of light reflected from bombers in a searchlight to less than one per cent; the use of nitrous oxide in the fuel to accelerate fighter aircraft; and a diffraction rangefinder for fighters, which was used against doodlebugs.

== Treasurer of the Royal Society ==
From 1939 to 1956, Merton was treasurer of the Royal Society, where his knowledge and experience of business were of considerable benefit. He formed a committee of experts to control its finances, and it was on his initiative that charitable bodies were given power to invest in company shares, where they had previously been limited to gilt-edged stock. The income of all the society's funds showed a large increase during his treasurership.

== Art collection ==
In 1930, John, the eldest of the Mertons' five sons, brought home the drawing prize from Eton and this proved a turning point in both his and his father's lives. It awoke in Merton some latent interest and he spent months in Italy with his son seeing all the great collections of Renaissance paintings. He began to make a remarkable collection of pictures of the period 1450–1520. From 1944 until his death he was a member of the scientific advisory board of the National Gallery, and its chairman from 1957 to 1965. He was also a trustee of the gallery, and of the National Portrait Gallery from 1955 to 1962. Merton was knighted in 1944 and in 1956 was appointed KBE due to his achievements as a treasurer of the Royal Academy. He was awarded the Holweck Prize in 1951 and the Rumford medal of the Royal Society in 1958.

"Preference is given to portraits which in expression, deportment and costume, convey a very clear idea of the life, taste and colour of their period... Next come the group of devotional pictures on a small scale, intended originally for the privacy of the home rather than public worship... A few pictures fascinate by their narrative as the predella by Fungai or the three Cassoni as do the drawings by being preparatory studies for the more elaborate works."

Twenty-two of the works, including drawings, were Italian, and ten of the northern schools.

Merton's instinctive connoisseurship is indicated by the distinction of so many of his acquisitions. The clou of his Italian pictures was the Botticelli Portrait of a Young Man holding a Medallion, now on loan to the National Gallery of Art, Washington, which had been in the Newborough collection: this cost £17,000 in 1941. He owned cassone panels formerly in the collections of Otto H. Kahn and Lord Crawford, as well as Fungai's predella panel of the Martyrdom of Saint Clement, now reunited with an erstwhile companion in the City Art Gallery, York. The Madonna and Child with a Donor by Bartolommeo Montagna, now in the Walker Art Gallery, Liverpool, is one of the most beautiful of that Vicentine master's creations and was the finest picture from the collection of Dr. Alfred Mond to be withheld from his bequest to the National Gallery. Signorelli's exceptional chalk study of a young warrior was sold by private treaty through Christie's, also to the Walker Art Gallery, in 1980. Of the northern pictures seven were portraits, the earliest being the Portrait of a Man formerly believed to be Guillaume Fillastre, long on loan to the National Gallery, now thought to be by a close follower of Rogier van der Weyden: purchased for £18,500 in 1940, this was sold in lieu of taxation through Christie's in 1987 and is now in the Courtauld Institute. The Behams catalogued below, which Scharf's erroneously ascribed to Mielich, were appropriately complemented by portraits by two of the artist's German contemporaries, Cranach and Hans Krell. Sir Thomas knew how important a contribution frames could make to the impact of his pictures, and in this respect was well served by Pollak, the framer who was admired by other major collectors of his generation.

Some sense of what pictures meant to Merton is suggested in two passages in the notebook in which he recorded certain thoughts.

"'Signal to noise ratio' is a term often used in physics. In fact it applies to everything we try to understand and measure, from the precision with which the deflection of a galvanometer can be read to the amount we can grasp of a conversation at a cocktail party, where the signal is what someone is saying to us and the noise is the integrated chatter of the other guests. It applies also to the fine arts. In what is perhaps one of the greatest of all works of art, Michelangelo's Pietà in St. Peter's, it is nearly all signal and no noise, while in the work of the action painters it is all noise and no signal. There is nothing new in the products of the action painters. Leonardo da Vinci in his notes says that 'if you look at any walls spotted with various stains or with a mixture of different kinds of stones, if you are about to invent some scene you will be able to see in it a resemblance to different landscapes adorned with mountains etc., etc., and an infinite number of things which you can reduce into separate and well-conceived forms.'"

"In these days of 'Do-it-yourself' we are expected to 'reduce into separate and well-conceived forms' ourselves. Some of us prefer to have it done for us by a great artist."

His collection showed that Sir Thomas could fairly be stated to have admired great artists. But his desire for possession was not unlimited:

"Pictures are like women. There are quite a number of them which one can admire without wanting to live with them."

== Later life ==
In 1947, Merton bought Stubbings House, at Maidenhead Thicket, Berkshire. Its spacious rooms made an appropriate setting for his collection of pictures. As a man of considerable wealth, he maintained what was probably the last private physics laboratory in Britain. Papers and patents continued to appear, based on his researches there. In 1957 he had several serious operations and thereafter he rarely left his home, where he died on 10 October 1969.

== See also ==
- William Merton, Thomas Merton's son and a prominent military scientist
