= Walter Devereux (born 1173) =

Anglo-Norman nobleman

- Born: 1173
- Died: about 1197
- Spouse: Cecilia de Longchamp
- Issue: Stephen Devereux; John Devereux; Nicholas Devereux
- Father: John Devereux (died 1187)

Walter Devereux was an Anglo-Norman nobleman living during the reign of king Henry II of England and Richard I of England. The Devereux, along with the Baskervilles and Pichards, were prominent knightly families along the Welsh marches during the twelfth century, and linked to William Marshal, 1st Earl of Pembroke, and the Braose and Lacy lordships of the region. William Devereux's descendants would later give rise to the Devereux Viscounts of Hereford and Earls of Essex.

== Ancestry ==
Walter Devereux is descended from William Devereux who held land in Hereford and Gloucester at Domesday in 1086.

William's son, Walter Devereux of Lyonshall, gained control of Lyonshall Castle as the caput of the Devereux marcher lordship. With the exile of Roger de Lacy in 1085, Walter of Lyonshall joined the retinue of Bernard de Neufmarché, Lord of Brecon. (Note: Walter of Lyonshall made a grant on the foundation charter of Neufmarche for Brecon Priory)

On the death of Bernard about 1125; another Walter Devereux, son of Walter of Lyonshall, joined the retinue of Miles de Gloucester, 1st Earl of Hereford. (Note: Miles de Gloucester had married Sybil, daughter of Bernard de Neufmarché) Taking advantage of the civil war between King Stephen and the Empress Matilda, this Walter Devereux increased his autonomy. (Note: This was facilitated in 1138 when King Stephen, while in pursuit of Geoffrey Talbot, captured Hereford and Weobley for a time, and Hereford was set on fire) Walter probably was present at the Battle of Lincoln, and the Rout of Winchester with the Earl of Hereford. A supporter of the Empress Maud, he was rewarded when her son, Henry II, finally took the throne. (Note: The Great Rolls of the Pipe from 1159 to 1164 during the reign of Henry II list in Herefordshire Walter Devereux being granted 9 shillings 'In terris datis.') With the end of the earldom of Hereford in 1155 and the death of the last of Miles de Gloucester's sons in 1165; Walter Devereux and his son, John, joined the retinue of William de Braose, 3rd Lord of Bramber. (Note: William de Braose married Bertha, the eldest daughter of Miles de Gloucester, earl of Hereford. Through her he inherited the lordship of Brecon)

When William de Braose, 3rd Lord of Bramber, died; John Devereux joined the retinue of his son, William de Braose, 4th Lord of Bramber. John Devereux would campaign in Wales, France, and Ireland under the younger de Braose.

As one of the prominent knightly families of the Welsh Marches, the Devereux became closely entwined with the de Braose, de Lacy, de Longchamp, and Marshal families. Through these connections, and following the Norman invasion of Ireland in 1071, the Devereux family established holdings in Ireland over the next three generations.

== Biography ==
Walter Devereux was born in 1173, the son of John Devereux and a woman named Constance. (Note: Constance may have been a member of the Marshal family. Stephen Devereux (c1191-1228), Walter Devereux's son, is referred to as a 'cousin' of William Marshal. The use of cousin in this context refers to being a member of an extended family. Constance presents a good candidate for the link between the two families) His father died in 1187 possibly from involvement in the de Braose campaigns in Wales and France. The Pipe Rolls of 1190 show 8 pounds and 13 pence of oblations due the king's court were pardoned for the lands of John Devereux in Herefordshire. As Walter was under-age his lands and 2 castles (including Lyonshall) were taken into the hands of the king and placed in the possession of the sheriff of Hereford, William de Braose. Devereux participated in the expansion of the Norman holdings in Ireland, and in 1210 Walter Devereux was listed as having been responsible to John (fitzJohn) Marshal for 20 shillings of fees for the maintenance of soldiers ‘beyond the water that is called Stiuthe,' and 2 marks for those at Carrickfergus in Ireland

Walter Devereux came of age in 1194. His father had granted a church on his lands in Oxenhall, Gloucester, to the Knights Hospitaller in 1186, and on 27 October 1194 Walter Devereux filed an Assize of mort d'ancestor against the Order over 2 marks rent in Oxenhall. (Note: Assise de morte antecessoris inter Walter de Euereus et fratres Ospitalis Jerusalem de 2 marcas redditus in Reneshullis est in praesentia domini Cantuariensis per literas suas directas justiciaris itinerantibus et recognicio non venerunt nisi vis et Henri de Saers esse se per Walter filius Walter et Walter de Wurmesle esse se per Hugonis filius Elie)

About 1186 Walter had witnessed with his father the land grant of Maud de Hagarnel to the priory of Brecon. About 1190 Devereux granted 12 acres of land near Berrington (Worcestershire) to the same priory ‘for the love he bore his lord, William de Braose the younger.’ This identifies Walter Devereux as a member of the military retinue of the Braose family. Devereux also witnessed the grant of land by William de Bradfelde of lands in Bradfield, (Note: Bradfield is a manor situated on the north-east limit of Bodenham parish) Petercroft, Laneglege, lands near Mara, Estlege, and in Weteroft near the chapel to the priory of Brecon. In 1211, Walter Devereux was listed as having held 1/2 knight's fee of the honor of Brecon.

== Marriage ==
Walter Devereux married Cecilia de Longchamp, daughter of Hugh de Longchamp. (Note: The Longchamp family held Wilton Castle in Herefordshire. Cecilia was the sister of William de Longchamp, Bishop of Ely; and Stephen de Longchamp who granted land to her eldest son, Stephen Devereux.)

They had children:

- Stephen Devereux, his heir and a retainer of William Marshal, 1st Earl of Pembroke.
- John Devereux, Knight of Bodenham and Decies (Ireland). He was enfeoffed by Thomas fitzAnthony, the loyal retainer of William Marshal. (Note: John Devereux witnessed his brother, Stephen Devereux’s, grant to Wormsley Priory. He is known to have had a son, Walter Devereux, who was given as hostage for his good behavior to King Henry III.)
- Nicholas Devereux, Lord of Chanston (Hereford), and Steward of Meath (Ireland) for Walter de Lacy, Lord of Meath (Note: He had children that were in possession of Chanstone and other lands in Hereford throughout the 13th century.)

== Death ==
Walter Devereux died about 1197, and as a member of the retinue of William de Braose this probably occurred in May 1197. At this time Braose was accompanying Richard I as England resumed its wars in France to recapture lands lost during his captivity. Many knights from the Welsh border were injured in the assault on the castle at Milly-sur-Therain where William Marshall himself led many into the fray. (Note: As noted above, Walter Devereux was a member of William Marshal's extended family)

== Landholdings ==
After Walter's death, his sons were fostered for training as knights: Stephen Devereux with William Marshal, 1st Earl of Pembroke; Nicholas Devereux with Walter de Lacy, Lord of Meath; and John Devereux with William de Braose, 4th Lord of Bramber. These sons would sire the three Devereux families that would play an integral role in controlling the Welsh marches during the thirteenth century. Also following the death of her husband, Cecilia began a series of legal fights to establish her dower rights which when added to the holdings of her eldest son, Stephen Devereux, provides an indication of the extent and influence of the Devereux holdings at the time.

Walter's ancestor, William Devereux, held Eastleach, Gloucester at Domesday in 1086. He had made grants in Leach and Hatherop in 1096 to the Church of St Peter in Gloucester. On 30 November 1215, the charters for the monastery of Saint Peter from 23 July 1100 were reviewed and confirmed. Among the grants were the lands in Eastleach comprising the greater part of the tithes of Lady Sibillae de Evereus (Cecilia Devereux). Cecilia was granted in May 1198 a hearing of a plea against Robert de Lechelad (Leachland) to be held on 20 October 1198 involving a half hide and 6 acres (36 acres) of land near Leach in Gloucester. Robert de Lechelad probably died later that year as in mid-May 1199 Master Ralph de Lechelad put Hugh de Welles in his place for the ongoing land plea against Cecilia, and a new date was set for 25 November 1199. William de Lechelad, Master Ralph's brother, was also granted a hearing at the same court if his health permitted. On 8 July 1199 Hugh de Welles, acting in place of Ralph de Lechelad, was granted a petition for the case to go forward as Ralph had recovered from his illness. As the matter progressed through the courts, on 8 November 1199 Cecilia Devereux put William Prudhome in her place in the matter of her plea against the brothers, Master Ralph and William de Lechelad. On 23 April 1200 it was postponed yet again until the king and court returned from Normandy. On 29 May 1200 Master Ralph and William de Lechelad put Hugh fitzWilliam in their place regarding the ongoing court case involving the 36 acres of land contested by Cecilia Devereux. The suit was adjourned without receiving a new date in January 1201 as the Lord of Norwich (John de Gray, Bishop of Norwich) was overseas on the king's service, and Master Ralph de Lichelade was in his service.

The court case between Devereux and Lechelad would not resume again for 10 years. On 14 October 1211 William de Lechelad testified under his sworn oath that by inheritance he had greater right to Leach, Gloucester, which Cecilia held in demesne. Cecelia presented her claim to Leach as her right because her grandfather, William Devereux (Note: This actually refers to the great-great-grandfather of her husband, William Devereux who died after 1110. The descent from this William Devereux of Domesday was as follows: William Devereux (died after 1110), Walter Devereux (died circa 1130), Walter Devereux (died about 1166), John Devereux (died 1187), and this Walter Devereux) held the land in the time of Henry, the king's father. (Note: William Devereux actually held the land in the time of Henry I who reigned from 1106 to 1135) William de Lechelad claimed the greater right to the holding based on his descent from William Devereux, (Note: The descent from this William Devereux of Domesday was as follows: William Devereux (died after 1110), Walter Devereux (died circa 1130), Roger Devereux Senior (died before 1189), Orenge Devereux, and William de Lechelad) and the passing of the land from William Devereux to Lechelad's mother, Orenge Devereux. Further, Lechelade stated that Cecilia's right only was through marriage. The case was granted a new date on 19 November 1211. On 19 November 1211 Cecilia put in her place Thomas fitzWilliam in the ongoing land dispute which had been delayed again. In January 1212 the assize was put in respite again due to a lack of jurors, and a new date given on 9 April 1212. On 21 May 1212, the hearing was delayed yet again due to lack of jurors, and a claim by Peter de Barton that William de Lechelade had not recovered from his previous illness. The court did not require Cecilia Devereux to accept this excuse as 4 knights had not yet confirmed his illness, and a new date was set. On 24 June 1212 the final hearing took place, and the jury found in favor of William de Lechelad and his heirs. Cecilia Devereux could make no further claims on these 33 acres. The Pipe Roll for Michaelmas 1212 records the payment by Cecilia Devereux of 2 marks for making a false claim.

On 30 November 1216 Cecilia demised all of her remaining lands and men in Eastleach for 5 years to the monks of Bruerne. On 23 February 1220 Robert de Turville paid the court half a mark to summon Cecilia Devereux to confirm a warrant for 12 virgate (360 acres) of land in Eastleach, Gloucester. On 22 May 1220 Turville claimed the right to warranty the land, and presented a supporting charter. Cecilia acknowledged the previous charter, and requested permission for them to come to an agreement and grant him a new charter re-affirming his warranty. The right to enter an agreement was withheld as the new charter contained a release by Robert de Turville of estover rights to Cecilia Devereux that had not been present in the original gift. This issue involved the rights of Turville's wife, and this had not been defined in the new document. The matter was discharge without a day until they could correct this. The Testa de Nevill records Cecilia Devereux and Galliana de Turville as holding 3 knight's fees in Eastleach of the fee of Walter de Lacy for ¼ pound.

Walter's ancestor, William Devereux, also held land at Elnodestune, Herefordshire at Domesday in 1086. Cecilia put forward a claim in late 1201 on 140 acres of bocage (woods and pasture) in Mescott, part of Alnatheston (Elnodestune), as the heir of her uncle, Roger Devereux, who held the land of Walter de Lacy. The court found in her favor, and validated her claim in January 1202.

Reginald de Dunhers of Elnodestune would counter her claim to 33 acres in Elnodestune. On 22 June 1205 Cecilia Devereux put Simon Tirell in her place for this land plea. Dunhers requested a delay of the hearing due to illness. In May 1206 Richard of Chandos, John Bankington, Geoffrey Ruff, and Jordan of Manington were sent to confirm that Reginald de Dunhers was truly too ill to attend the court proceedings. On 25 May 1206 they confirmed that he was incapacitated, and a new hearing granted for 26 June 1207 at the Tower of London. On 26 June 1206 the delay granted on 25 May 1206 due to Reginald's illness was again confirmed, and the delay was extended indefinitely due to the absence of Reginald's son, John de Dunhers, in the service of the king overseas. On 29 January 1207 Cecilia Devereux claimed in court that the 33 acres in Elnodestune were hers by hereditary right as they had been held by her grandfather, William Devereux, in the time of Henry, father of the king. Reginald denied her right making a grand assize of his own claiming a greater right to the land, and a day was granted on 6 May 1207 to hear the case. Reginald put his son, John of Dunhers, in his place for this hearing. On 7 October 1207 Reginald de Dunhers gave the king 1 mark for an agreement between him and Cecilia Devereux regarding the 33 acres in Elnodestune. The payment was guaranteed by pledge of John de Dunhers and Lawrence Canute.

On 26 January 1222 Cecilia Devereux paid the court a half mark to move a case from the regional court to the superior courts held during Easter term at Westminster. The plea involved the complaint of Richard Fulcon (Fulton) concerning 2 knight's fees in Alnathestun (Elnodestune). The half mark was recorded as paid on the Pipe Roll for Michaelmas 1223. On 14 January 1224 Richard, son of Godfrey Fulton, brought suit against Cecilia Devereux for one knight's fee in Elnodestune, and one knight's fee in Putley. His claim was based on the land being held by his uncle, Roger Devereux, in the time of King Henry, (Note: Henry II who reigned from 1154 to 1189) grandfather of the King, (Note: Henry III who reigned from 1216 to 1272) and assessed at a value of 20 shillings. (Note: Roger Devereux held 4 knight’s fees in Herefordshire in 1166) Roger Devereux died without heirs and his rights passed to a sister, Sybil Devereux. Sybil had a son, Godfrey Fulton, and a grandson, the complainant Richard Fulton. (Note: The descent from William Devereux of Domesday was as follows: William Devereux (died after 1110), Walter Devereux (died circa 1130), Roger Devereux Senior (died before 1189), Sybil Devereux, Godfrey Fulton, and Richard Fulton. Sybil’s brother was Roger Devereux Junior) Cecilia countered Fulton's claims. Concerning the fee of Elnodestune, she did not hold that fee directly, but as part of the holding of Walter de Lacy. Richard Fulton could not counter this and yielded his complaint. Concerning the fee of Putley, she denied holding a whole fee, but admitted possessing a third of a fee. Richard Fulton indicated that regardless of whether it is a third or a whole fee, this is the fee that corresponds to his ancestor's holding. Cecilia put forward that the court should deny his claim as Roger Devereux had two sisters, Orenge and Sybil, and they possess an equal claim. As the descendants of Orenge put forward no claim, (Note: The de Lechelad family discussed above) she asserts that she should not respond to the current complaint. Fulton countered that Orenge never married the man she was betrothed to, and her children by Parson Ralph de Lichelade were illegitimate. Cecilia put forward that it is true Orenge did not marry her fiancée, but land was given her as dowry based on her relationship with Parson Ralph. These rights passed to her children thereby establishing their legitimacy. The land passed to Orenge's son, Master Ralph de Lechelad, who gave it to his brother, William. Cecilia showed that she had sued William, and the king's court found in Lechelad's favor confirming legitimacy. She called for the court to vouch this warranty, which was done, and the court found in favor of Cecilia. About 1235, the Book of Fees compiled the military tenants of the Honour of Weobley who held of Walter de Lacy. The list included William Devereux, grandson of Cecilia by her eldest son, Stephen, holding a half fee in (Lower) Hayton, Salop; and Cecilia Devereux and her son, Nicholas, holding four fees with William de Furches. Nicholas Devereux's holdings included Chanstone manor in Elnodestune, Herefordshire.

Walter's ancestor, William Devereux, also had land at Putley at the time of Domesday in 1086. William Devereux granted the chapel of Putley to the canons of the Church of Saint Mary and Saint Ethelbert (later incorporated into Hereford). The gift would be confirmed by later charters The Testa de Nevill showed Cecilia Devereux holding land in Putley. She put forward a claim on the church at Putley, which was granted by the king's court.

In April 1205 the Bishop of Hereford was summoned to appear before the court for his refusal to admit a suitable priest to this church currently in the possession of Cecilia Devereux. In his defense he stated that the clergy of the Hereford Chapter refused to allow an appointment as they claimed possession of this chapel. They requested the right to present their case. On 6 June 1205 Hugh, Dean of Hereford, paid 2 marks for convening another court to hear his suit countering the recognition of Cecilia's holding of the chapel at Putley. On 29 June 1206, the Bishop of Hereford and his attorney appeared before the court claiming the church of Putley as their right, and that the grant to Cecilia Devereux had only occurred because the hearing proceeded too quickly to allow them to present their case. When the canons were informed of Cecilia's claim, they had requested that the sheriff of Hereford put her claim on hold and were told this would require a warrant of the king. The canons submitted an assize presenting their position, and paid 12 shillings for the court to be summoned. On 15 October 1206 the Canons of Hereford appeared to show by what right the claim of Cecilia to the chapel of Putley should be set aside. They argued that they had been in possession of the chapel for over 60 years, and presented the original charter granting them the chapel by William Devereux. They also presented a charter of the Bishop of Hereford, which later confirmed the original grant. They argued that the granting of the claim of Cecilia Devereux had occurred too quickly for them to respond, and when they had discovered that it had occurred they began the proceedings to regain their rights. On the payment of 40 shillings, the sheriff was ordered to have a jury assembled on 26 November 1206. The sheriff failed to gather the jury on this day and the hearing was postponed to January 1207. Hugh, Dean of Hereford, put Walter de la Puille in his place for the hearing now occurring on 29 January 1207. On this date the court found in favor of the Canons of Hereford. On 7 October 1207 Cecilia Devereux was fined 3 marks, and she released her claims and those of her future heirs. The canons paid Cecilia 8 marks, and granted her the privilege of having her name celebrated in Hereford Cathedral at the annual thanksgiving to benefactors, and daily in service of the church of Putley.

== General References ==
- Holden, Brock W. Lords of the Central Marches. (Oxford; Oxford University Press, 2008)
- Robinson, Charles J. A History of the Castles of Herefordshire and their Lords. (Great Britain; Antony Rowe LTD, 2002). Page 125-129
- Roche, Richard. The Norman Invasion of Ireland. (Dublin; Anvil Books, 1995)
- Watkins, Morgan G. Collections Towards the History and Antiquities of the County of Hereford in continuation of Duncumb's History, Hundred of Radlow. (High Town, Hereford; Jakeman & Carver, 1902). Pages 42 to 49. Parish of Castle Frome. Genealogy contributed by Lord Hereford.
