= Wormsley Priory =

Monastic house in Herefordshire, England

Coordinates: 52.1312°N 2.8243°W

Wormsley Priory was a monastic house in Herefordshire, England at grid reference SO43584847. It was built around 1200. It was built for the Canons Regular of St Augustine, by the Talbot family. The building was later demolished, with the materials being used to construct Wormsley Grange.
