= Staunton on Wye =

Civil parish in Herefordshire, England

Coordinates: 52°06′N 2°55′W

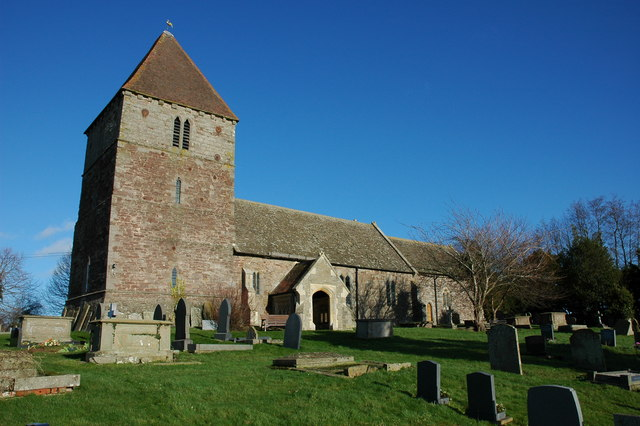
St Mary's church

Staunton on Wye is a relatively unpopulated civil parish in West Herefordshire, which is perhaps one of the most uninhabited locations of England. The parish of Staunton, which includes Moorhampton and Bredwardine, is a key player in trading in Herefordshire. The population of this parish taken at the 2011 census was 213.

The village lies on the A438, a trunk road linking England and Wales mid way up the country. Sadly, this area has become a well known hotspot for speeding, antisocial vehicle use and reckless driving incidents, partially because of the straight, flat nature of the Roman road that passes through, but also exacerbated by the lack of enforcement by West Mercia police in this outer most edge of the catchment. Traffic surveys conducted in the area after recent collisions and resident's concerns showed significant speeding occurrence in the area, with some instances of vehicles even travelling more than double the local speed limit. The route is also frequented by motorcyclists travelling in and out of Wales at the weekend in the summer months which was when many of these incidents were recorded. Locals have anecdotally mentioned in forums and neighbouring parish council meetings that it is a badly kept secret that people from across Herefordshire and the wider area visit this stretch of road purely for the purpose of maxing out their vehicles as the chance of being caught by a mobile speed camera is virtually zero along the two mile stretch through the village. Many locals also report that they have had near misses on this section of road, whether turning in and out of the village junctions or using the local footpaths that cross the road. Recently, many villages raised this problem when a planning application for nearly 50 new homes was lodged, with some citing the dangerous nature of the road would become even worse unless something was done to make the A438 safer. Many fear it is only a matter of time before residents or visitors going to the village shops, schools or surgery are involved in a fatal accident on this road.

Recently, the village has become a growth area for various forms of development, unfortunately several developments have actively sought to undermine local planning rules and neighbourhood development frameworks, which has tarnished the reputation of the village to some extent. The most significant development in Staunton-on-wye in recent years is OakChurch, the local farm shop-cum-superstore. Despite its humble beginnings as a roadside shack selling strawberries and other soft fruit it has grown into a business selling everything from garden supplies to home decor. The sale of soft fruit still makes up a large portion of the business. This can be seen in the many hectares of local farmland that have been converted to polytunnels, resulting in Staunton's unglamorous nickname of "Staunton-on-plastic"!

== History ==
Staunton was inhabited until 1089 AD. The parish church dates from around 1190–1200, when King Richard I was on crusades, and several of Herefordshire's other churches are thought to have been founded. The nave has round-headed doorways with a small lancet. Some of the windows date from 14th century. The west tower has a pyramidal roof constructed in about 1300 to which oak panelling was added in 17th century. The church was burgled in 1992 when six invaluable medallions from the Reformation were stolen. Two bay arcades remain from the demolished north transept which was a chapel. Modernisation has replaced the windows in the 18th century chancel.

The village itself is fairly unusual as it has huge Victorian mansions within it. Within the medieval parish there is a small school and the grade I listed church of St Mary.

Located nearby is a nature area known as The Scar, situated on the banks of the River Wye. Included is a sheer 100 feet drop net to the river. The Scar is considered dangerous to children. There was a small station in the early 1900s consisting of staff who would warn the major towns and cities downstream of the impending flood waters of the large River Wye.

Staunton has historically been a village notorious for harbouring a shallow gene pool. This stereotype is likely to be because of an unintended after effect from the monetary legacy of G. Jarvis who bequeathed a large amount of money to the area in the 1800s. It is understood that families married close relatives in order to prevent the wealth from flowing out of the village. Still to this day, despite improvements in social mobility, it is not uncommon to find members of the village who are particularly closely related to one another.
