= Club Resorts Ltd v Van Breda =

- Supreme Court of Canada

Hearing: March 21, 2011 Judgment: April 18, 2012
- Citations: 2012 SCC 17
- Docket No.: 33692
- Prior history: APPEALS from a judgment of the Ontario Court of Appeal (O'Connor A.C.J.O. and Weiler, MacPherson, Sharpe and Rouleau JJ.A.), 2010 ONCA 84, affirming a decision of Pattillo J., 2008 CanLII 32309 (ON SC), and affirming a decision of Mulligan J., 2008 CanLII 53834 (ON SC),(sub nom. Charron Estate v. Village Resorts Ltd.).
- Ruling: Appeals dismissed.

Holding
- The court cannot decline to exercise its jurisdiction unless the defendant invokes forum non conveniens. The decision to raise this doctrine rests with the parties, not with the court seized of the claim. If a defendant raises an issue of forum non conveniens, the burden is on him or her to show why the court should decline to exercise its jurisdiction and displace the forum chosen by the plaintiff.

Court membership
- Chief Justice: Beverley McLachlin; Puisne Justices: Ian Binnie, Louis LeBel, Marie Deschamps, Morris Fish, Rosalie Abella, Louise Charron, Marshall Rothstein, Thomas Cromwell

Reasons given
- Unanimous reasons by: Lebel J.
- Binnie and Charron JJ. took no part in the consideration or decision of the case.

Club Resorts Ltd v Van Breda, 2012 SCC 17, is a decision of the Supreme Court of Canada that has brought greater certainty to the question of a real and substantial connection in the assumption of civil jurisdiction by Canadian courts in matters concerning the conflict of laws.

== The facts ==
In separate cases, two individuals were injured while on vacation outside of Canada. Van Breda suffered catastrophic injuries on a beach in Cuba, and Charron died while scuba diving there. Actions were brought in Ontario against a number of parties, including Club Resorts Ltd., a company incorporated in the Cayman Islands, that managed the two hotels where the accidents occurred.

Club Resorts sought to block those proceedings, arguing that:

- the Ontario courts lacked jurisdiction, and, in the alternative,
- a Cuban court would be a more appropriate forum on the basis of the doctrine of forum non conveniens.

In both cases, the judges at first instance held that Ontario courts did have jurisdiction, and that an Ontario court was the more appropriate forum. The two cases were heard together by the Ontario Court of Appeal, where the appeals were both dismissed. Both were subsequently appealed to the Supreme Court of Canada.

== At the Supreme Court of Canada ==
In a 7-0 ruling, both appeals were dismissed.

Lebel J. observed that the case concerned the elaboration of the real and substantial connection test as an appropriate common law conflicts rule for the assumption of jurisdiction. In determining whether a court can assume jurisdiction over a certain claim, the preferred approach in Canada has been to rely on a set of specific factors which are given presumptive effect, as opposed to a regime based on an exercise of almost pure and individualized judicial discretion.

Jurisdiction must be established primarily on the basis of objective factors that connect the legal situation or the subject matter of the litigation with the forum. In a case concerning a tort, the following factors are presumptive connecting factors that, prima facie, entitle a court to assume jurisdiction over a dispute:

- the defendant is domiciled or resident in the province;
- the defendant carries on business in the province;
- the tort was committed in the province; and
- a contract connected with the dispute was made in the province.

The list above is not an exhaustive one. In identifying new presumptive factors, a court should look to connections that give rise to a relationship with the forum that is similar in nature to the ones which result from the listed factors. Relevant considerations include:

- Similarity of the connecting factor with the recognized presumptive connecting factors;
- Treatment of the connecting factor in the case law;
- Treatment of the connecting factor in statute law; and
- Treatment of the connecting factor in the private international law of other legal systems with a shared commitment to order, fairness and comity.

A clear distinction must be drawn between the existence and the exercise of jurisdiction. Once jurisdiction is established, if the defendant does not raise further objections, the litigation proceeds before the court of the forum. The court cannot decline to exercise its jurisdiction unless the defendant invokes forum non conveniens. The decision to raise this doctrine rests with the parties, not with the court seized of the claim. If a defendant raises an issue of forum non conveniens, the burden is on him or her to show why the court should decline to exercise its jurisdiction and displace the forum chosen by the plaintiff. Ultimately, the decision falls within the reasoned discretion of the trial court. This exercise of discretion will be entitled to deference from higher courts, absent an error of law or a clear and serious error in the determination of relevant facts which takes place at an interlocutory or preliminary stage.

=== Application to the appeals at hand ===
In the Van Breda case:

- a contract was entered into in Ontario
- Club Resorts failed to rebut the resulting presumption of jurisdiction
- Club Resorts failed to show that a Cuban court would clearly be a more appropriate forum
- issues related to the fairness to the parties and to the efficient disposition of the claim must be considered, as a trial held in Cuba would present serious challenges to the parties.

Therefore, the Ontario court was the more appropriate venue.

In the Charron case:

- Club Resorts was carrying on a business in Ontario
- its activities in Ontario went well beyond promoting a brand and advertising
- it benefitted from the physical presence of an office in Ontario
- Club Resorts failed to rebut the resulting presumption of jurisdiction
- Club Resorts failed to show that a Cuban court would clearly be a more appropriate forum

Therefore, considerations of fairness to the parties weighed heavily in favour of the plaintiffs.

== Aftermath ==
Van Breda builds upon the jurisprudence the SCC has established in this matter, which includes the previous rulings issued in:

- Morguard Investments Ltd. v. De Savoye
- Hunt v. T&N plc and
- Beals v. Saldanha

It also replaces a previous attempt by the Ontario Court of Appeal to standardize the jurisprudence in this area in Muscutt v. Courcelles.

Van Breda was immediately applied to two other judgments handed down by the SCC on the same day, which were concerned with libel:

- Éditions Écosociété Inc. v. Banro Corp., 2012 SCC 18
- Breeden v. Black, 2012 SCC 19

In both of these cases, the Ontario court was determined to be the most appropriate forum as well. This has raised the concern that the incidence of libel tourism to Canadian courts may increase as a result. In addition, the question of which substantive law should be applied in multijurisdictional claims has been left unresolved.

The determination of whether an entity is carrying on a business in a Canadian jurisdiction is also impacted, as the SCC expressed a preference for a physical presence, as opposed to a virtual presence. This may need to be explored further in future cases.

Van Breda also confirms that foreign companies that reside, conduct business or enter into agreements in a Canadian province will be subject to its jurisdiction, unless they can rebut the presumption of a real and substantial connection to the Canadian jurisdiction, or include exclusive forum or arbitration clauses in their contracts.
