= List of United States Supreme Court cases, volume 159 =

Supreme Court of the United States
- Interactive map of Supreme Court of the United States
- 38°53′26″N 77°00′16″W
- Established: March 4, 1789; 236 years ago
- Location: Washington, D.C.
- Coordinates: 38°53′26″N 77°00′16″W
- Composition method: Presidential nomination with Senate confirmation
- Authorised by: Constitution of the United States, Art. III, § 1
- Judge term length: life tenure, subject to impeachment and removal
- Number of positions: 9 (by statute)
- Website: supremecourt.gov

This is a list of cases reported in volume 159 of United States Reports, decided by the Supreme Court of the United States in 1895.

== Justices of the Supreme Court at the time of volume 159 U.S. ==
The Supreme Court is established by Article III, Section 1 of the Constitution of the United States, which says: "The judicial Power of the United States, shall be vested in one supreme Court . . .". The size of the Court is not specified; the Constitution leaves it to Congress to set the number of justices. Under the Judiciary Act of 1789 Congress originally fixed the number of justices at six (one chief justice and five associate justices). Since 1789 Congress has varied the size of the Court from six to seven, nine, ten, and back to nine justices (always including one chief justice).

When the cases in volume 159 were decided the Court comprised the following nine members:

Portrait	Justice	Office	Home State	Succeeded	Date confirmed by the Senate (Vote)	Tenure on Supreme Court
	Melville Fuller	Chief Justice	Illinois	Morrison Waite	July 20, 1888 (41–20)	October 8, 1888 – July 4, 1910 (Died)
	Stephen Johnson Field	Associate Justice	California	newly created seat	March 10, 1863 (Acclamation)	May 10, 1863 – December 1, 1897 (Retired)
	John Marshall Harlan	Associate Justice	Kentucky	David Davis	November 29, 1877 (Acclamation)	December 10, 1877 – October 14, 1911 (Died)
	Horace Gray	Associate Justice	Massachusetts	Nathan Clifford	December 20, 1881 (51–5)	January 9, 1882 – September 15, 1902 (Died)
	David Josiah Brewer	Associate Justice	Kansas	Stanley Matthews	December 18, 1889 (53–11)	January 6, 1890 – March 28, 1910 (Died)
	Henry Billings Brown	Associate Justice	Michigan	Samuel Freeman Miller	December 29, 1890 (Acclamation)	January 5, 1891 – May 28, 1906 (Retired)
	George Shiras Jr.	Associate Justice	Pennsylvania	Joseph P. Bradley	July 26, 1892 (Acclamation)	October 10, 1892 – February 23, 1903 (Retired)
	Howell Edmunds Jackson	Associate Justice	Tennessee	Lucius Quintus Cincinnatus Lamar	February 18, 1893 (Acclamation)	March 4, 1893 – August 8, 1895 (Died)
	Edward Douglass White	Associate Justice	Louisiana	Samuel Blatchford	February 19, 1894 (Acclamation)	March 12, 1894 – December 18, 1910 (Continued as chief justice)

== Notable Case in 159 U.S. ==
=== Hilton v. Guyot ===
In Hilton v. Guyot, 159 U.S. 113 (1895), the Supreme Court ruled that the recognition and enforceability of a foreign judgment rested on the "comity of nations," namely whether there would be any reciprocity and mutual recognition by the foreign jurisdiction from which the judgment was issued. Hilton established the fundamental basis for the recognition and enforcement of foreign judgments in the United States, remaining "the most detailed exposition of any American court" on this principle. It is also viewed as the quintessential statement of comity in international law, and is one of the earliest decisions of the U.S. Supreme Court to assert that international law is part of U.S. law.

== Citation style ==
Under the Judiciary Act of 1789 the federal court structure at the time comprised District Courts, which had general trial jurisdiction; Circuit Courts, which had mixed trial and appellate (from the US District Courts) jurisdiction; and the United States Supreme Court, which had appellate jurisdiction over the federal District and Circuit courts—and for certain issues over state courts. The Supreme Court also had limited original jurisdiction (i.e., in which cases could be filed directly with the Supreme Court without first having been heard by a lower federal or state court). There were one or more federal District Courts and/or Circuit Courts in each state, territory, or other geographical region.

The Judiciary Act of 1891 created the United States Courts of Appeals and reassigned the jurisdiction of most routine appeals from the district and circuit courts to these appellate courts. The Act created nine new courts that were originally known as the "United States Circuit Courts of Appeals." The new courts had jurisdiction over most appeals of lower court decisions. The Supreme Court could review either legal issues that a court of appeals certified or decisions of court of appeals by writ of certiorari.

Bluebook citation style is used for case names, citations, and jurisdictions.

- "# Cir." = United States Court of Appeals
  - e.g., "3d Cir." = United States Court of Appeals for the Third Circuit
- "C.C.D." = United States Circuit Court for the District of . . .
  - e.g.,"C.C.D.N.J." = United States Circuit Court for the District of New Jersey
- "D." = United States District Court for the District of . . .
  - e.g.,"D. Mass." = United States District Court for the District of Massachusetts
- "E." = Eastern; "M." = Middle; "N." = Northern; "S." = Southern; "W." = Western
  - e.g.,"C.C.S.D.N.Y." = United States Circuit Court for the Southern District of New York
  - e.g.,"M.D. Ala." = United States District Court for the Middle District of Alabama
- "Ct. Cl." = United States Court of Claims
- The abbreviation of a state's name alone indicates the highest appellate court in that state's judiciary at the time.
  - e.g.,"Pa." = Supreme Court of Pennsylvania
  - e.g.,"Me." = Supreme Judicial Court of Maine

== List of cases in volume 159 U.S. ==
Case Name	Page & year	Opinion of the Court	Concurring opinion(s)	Dissenting opinion(s)	Lower Court	Disposition
White v. Van Horn	3 (1895)	White	none	none	C.C.N.D. Tex.	affirmed
Townsend v. St. Louis et al. Co.	21 (1895)	Shiras	none	none	C.C.S.D. Ill.	affirmed
White v. Ewing	36 (1895)	Brown	none	none	6th Cir.	certification
Horne v. Smith	40 (1895)	Brewer	none	none	C.C.N.D. Fla.	affirmed
Wisconsin C.R.R. Co. v. Forsythe	46 (1895)	Brewer	none	none	C.C.W.D. Wis.	reversed
Spencer v. McDougal	62 (1895)	Brewer	none	none	C.C.W.D. Wis.	reversed
Texas & P. Ry. Co. v. Smith	66 (1895)	Brewer	none	none	C.C.W.D. La.	reversed
Gray v. Connecticut	74 (1895)	Field	none	none	Conn.	affirmed
United States v. Burr	78 (1895)	Fuller	none	none	2d Cir.	certification
Grand Rapids & I.R.R. Co. v. Butler	87 (1895)	Fuller	none	none	Mich.	affirmed
Ex parte Belt	95 (1895)	Fuller	none	none	Sup. Ct. D.C.	habeas corpus denied
Brown v. United States	100 (1895)	Harlan	none	none	C.C.W.D. Ark.	reversed
Central L. Co. v. Laidley	103 (1895)	Gray	none	none	W. Va.	dismissed
Hilton v. Guyot	113 (1895)	Gray	none	Fuller	C.C.S.D.N.Y.	reversed
Ritchie v. McMullen	235 (1895)	Gray	Fuller	none	C.C.N.D. Ohio	affirmed
Indiana v. Kentucky	275 (1895)	Fuller	none	none	original	commissioners
Simmons v. Burlington et al. Ry. Co.	278 (1895)	Shiras	none	none	C.C.S.D. Iowa	reversed
Richmond N. Co. v. Richmond	293 (1895)	Brown	none	none	C.C.S.D. Ill.	reversed
Gilfillan v. McKee	303 (1895)	Brown	none	none	Sup. Ct. D.C.	reversed
McKee v. Lamon	317 (1895)	Brown	none	none	Sup. Ct. D.C.	reversed
McKee v. Latrobe	327 (1895)	Brown	none	none	Sup. Ct. D.C.	affirmed
McCormick v. Hayes	332 (1895)	Harlan	none	none	Iowa	reversed
Sioux City et al. R.R. Co. v. United States	349 (1895)	Harlan	none	none	C.C.N.D. Iowa	affirmed
Chicago et al. Ry. Co. v. United States	372 (1895)	Harlan	none	none	C.C.N.D. Iowa	affirmed
Sioux City et al. R.R. Co. v. Countryman	377 (1895)	Harlan	none	none	Iowa	affirmed
Sweet v. Rechel	380 (1895)	Harlan	none	none	C.C.D. Mass.	affirmed
Borgmeyer v. Idler	408 (1895)	Fuller	none	none	3d Cir.	dismissed
California v. Holladay	415 (1895)	Fuller	none	none	Cal.	dismissed
Sonn v. Magone	417 (1895)	Fuller	none	none	C.C.S.D.N.Y.	affirmed
Thorn W.H. Co. v. Washburn & M. Mfg. Co.	423 (1895)	Shiras	none	none	C.C.N.D. Ill.	affirmed
United States v. Chaves	452 (1895)	Shiras	none	none	Ct. Priv. Land Cl.	affirmed
Incandescent Lamp Patent	465 (1895)	Brown	none	none	C.C.W.D. Pa.	affirmed
Richards v. Chase E. Co.	477 (1895)	Brown	none	none	C.C.N.D. Ill.	rehearing denied
Isaacs v. United States	487 (1895)	Brown	none	none	C.C.W.D. Ark.	affirmed
Shiver v. United States	491 (1895)	Brown	none	none	5th Cir.	certification
Patton v. United States	500 (1895)	Brown	none	none	C.C.E.D. Pa.	affirmed
Thiede v. Utah	510 (1895)	Brewer	none	none	Sup. Ct. Terr. Utah	affirmed
Wheeler v. United States	523 (1895)	Brewer	none	none	C.C.E.D. Tex.	affirmed
Winona et al. Co. v. Minnesota I	526 (1895)	Brewer	none	none	Minn.	affirmed
Winona et al. Co. v. Minnesota II	540 (1895)	Brewer	none	none	Minn.	dismissed
Weeks v. Bridgman	541 (1895)	Fuller	none	none	Minn.	affirmed
United States v. American B.T. Co.	548 (1895)	Fuller	none	none	1st Cir.	dismissal denied
Magone v. Wiederer	555 (1895)	White	none	none	C.C.S.D.N.Y.	affirmed
De Jonge v. Magone	562 (1895)	White	none	none	C.C.S.D.N.Y.	affirmed
Cowley v. Northern P.R.R. Co.	569 (1895)	Brown	none	none	C.C.D. Wash.	reversed
Hilton's Adm'r v. Jones	584 (1895)	Brown	none	none	C.C.D. Neb.	affirmed
Clune v. United States	590 (1895)	Brewer	none	none	S.D. Cal.	affirmed
McDowell v. United States	596 (1895)	Brewer	none	none	4th Cir.	certification
Baltimore & O.R.R. Co. v. Griffith	603 (1895)	Fuller	none	none	C.C.S.D. Ohio	affirmed
Folsom v. Township 96	611 (1895)	Gray	none	none	4th Cir.	certification
Rutland R.R. Co. v. Central Vt. R.R. Co.	630 (1895)	Gray	none	none	Vt. Chan.	dismissed
Stewart v. McHarry	643 (1895)	Field	none	none	Cal.	affirmed
Mills v. Green	651 (1895)	Gray	none	none	4th Cir.	dismissed
Gillis v. Stinchfield	658 (1895)	Fuller	none	none	Cal.	dismissed
Lambert v. Barrett	660 (1895)	Fuller	none	none	C.C.D.N.J.	affirmed
Goode v. United States	663 (1895)	Brown	none	none	D. Mass.	affirmed
Moore v. Missouri	673 (1895)	Fuller	none	none	Mo.	affirmed
Bucklin v. United States I	680 (1895)	Harlan	none	none	D. Kan.	dismissed
Bucklin v. United States II	682 (1895)	Harlan	none	none	D. Kan.	reversed
The Bayonne	687 (1895)	Fuller	none	none	C.C.S.D.N.Y.	dismissed
Ansbro v. United States	695 (1895)	Fuller	none	none	C.C.S.D.N.Y.	dismissed
Little Rock et al. Co. v. East Tenn. et al. R.R. Co.	698 (1895)	Fuller	none	none	C.C.W.D. Tenn.	dismissed

== See also ==
- Certificate of division
