= William Devereux =

11th and 12th-century Anglo-Norman nobleman in England

- Died: after 1110
- Spouse: Hawise de Lacy
- Issue: Walter Devereux, Lord of Lyonshall; Gilbert Devereux

William Devereux was an Anglo-Norman nobleman living during the reigns of kings William I, William II, and Henry I of England. The Devereux, along with the Baskervilles and Pichards, were prominent knightly families along the Welsh marches at the beginning of the twelfth century, and linked to the Braose and Lacy lordships of the region. William Devereux's descendants would later give rise to the Devereux family of Hereford, and the Devereux Viscounts of Hereford and Earls of Essex.

== Career ==
Following the Norman conquest of England, William Devereux was granted lands along the Welsh Marches in Herefordshire, Shropshire, and Gloucester as a member of the retinue of Walter de Lacy. Shortly after the Battle of Hastings rebellion broke out along the Welsh marches. Devereux probably participated in efforts to counter the attacks of Eadric the Wild and the Welsh on Hereford. In 1069, Walter de Lacy countered an attack and then led a retaliatory raid into Wales. Eadric the Wild burned Shrewsbury, but unsuccessfully besieged its castle. Late in 1069 King William led the local forces in defeating Eadric the Wild at the Battle of Stafford, and forcing his submission in 1070.

In 1075 the Revolt of the Earls broke out against King William’s rule. It was led by Roger de Breteuil, earl of Hereford; Ralph, earl of East Anglia; and Waltheof, Earl of Northumbria. Walter de Lacy, and probably William Devereux as part of his retinue, played a critical role in preventing the earl of Hereford’s forces linking up with the other rebels, which lead to the collapse of the revolt.

William Devereux probably would have attended the king as he spent Christmas of 1080 at Gloucester. Devereux would have been expected to participate in king William’s movement into Wales in 1081, which may have been a military raid to quell local resistance.

William Devereux’s son, Walter Devereaux, began training as a knight about 1084 in the retinue of Walter de Lacy. Following Walter de Lacy’s sudden death on 25 March 1085, the allegiance of the family was transferred to Walter de Lacy’s son, Roger de Lacy.

At Domesday in 1086 William Devereux held lands along the Welsh Marches. Lyonshall was held by William's son, Walter Devereux, and Lyonshall Castle was constructed at the direction of his overlord, Roger de Lacy during the early 1090's.

William was a benefactor of the Abbey at Gloucester (Church of St. Peter in Gloucester). In 1086 William the Conqueror issued a charter to the abbey confirming the land it possessed, and William Devereux was identified as giving 1 hide of land. During the time of King William Rufus in 1096 he was identified as granting a hide in Herefordshire, and two tenths (duas decimas) from 'Leech and Hadrop'. A list of donations to the abbey showed William Devereux giving one hide of land in Jerchenfeld, Westone, and tithes from Haythrop, in the time of Abbot Serlo (1072 to 1104). Other sources indicate he confirmed the grant of a hide in Herefordshire to St. Peter’s Abbey at Gloucester in the tenth year of Henry I (1110). During the time of Abbot William (1113 to 1130) a woman named Hawise, identified as the widow of William Devereux, appeared on a list of donations as giving the land called Hyde, and that Walter de Lacy had given this to her upon her marriage. The gift of William Devereux of one hide of land to the abbey was confirmed again by King Stephen in 1138, the Archbishop of Canterbury between 1139 and 1148, and King Henry II about 1174.

William Devereux's overlord, Roger de Lacy, participated in a conspiracy led by Robert de Mowbray to replace King William II with his brother, but was discovered and banished in 1095. When de Lacy was exiled Lyonshall castle came under the direct control of the Devereux family, and eventually they became its chief lords. With his feudal lord's banishment William Devereux transferred his feudal allegiance to Bernard de Neufmarché, (Note: William Devereux may also have been supporting Bernard de Neufmarché as he completed his conquest of Brycheiniog at the Battle of Brecon in 1093) Lord of Brecon. In 1170 a nave was constructed in Worcester Cathedral containing a stained glass window, showing Bernard de Neufmarche surrounded by 12 knights, and one bore the Devereux shield.

In 1095 King William II lost men and horses on a foray into Wales, and again led an expedition in 1097 that failed to bring the Welsh to battle. William Devereux would have been expected to participate in these ongoing Welsh border battles.

Between 1101 and Michaelmas 1102 William Devereux witnessed a charter of Henry I to the prior of St. Wulmar in Boulogne. The charter confirmed the granting of the manor of Nutfield in Surrey to the canons by Ida, Countess of Boulogne.

William witnessed an undated grant by William de Hussemain of a tenement in the manor of Castle Frome, Herefordshire, to Walter de Longchamp. Another witness to this document, Baldwyn de Boulers, was married by 1102, and signed a charter of Henry I to Shrewsbury Abbey in 1121.

William Devereux and his wife also made further grants to the church of his chapel at Putley, stating in the charter "Know all present and to come, that I, William Devereux, with the assent and advice of my wife, and my heirs, have given and granted God and St. Mary and St. Ethelbert all of my rights in the chapel of Putley." This would be confirmed by a later Dean of Hereford, 'Ralph Murdac,' who confirmed the grant, "which William Devereux, has given my predecessor."

== Family ==
William married Hawise de Lacy, daughter of Walter de Lacy. This marriage occurred after 1066 as her dowry included post-conquest land grants. They had issue:

- Walter Devereux, Lord of Lyonshall, (Note: The Marches Archeology report describes an annotation on the domesday manuscript indicating that the Walter holding Lyonshall was 'de Ebrois') and a benefactor to Brecknock priory in the reign of Henry I
- Gilbert Devereux, chaplain to the King and Treasurer of Normandy (Note: His son, Robert Devereux, was a benefactor to Brecknock priory in the reign of Henry I. He was identified on the same charter as Walter Devereux of Lyonshall. He died in 1130, and his son, Reginald, claimed his lands in Cornwall (Pipe Roll, 31 Henry I, Michaelmas 1130).)

== Domesday landholdings ==
According to the Domesday Book, William Devereux held the following lands valued at about £17 12 shillings in 1086 under the tenant-in-chief Roger de Lacy:

Landholdings in the Domesday Book of William Devereux

- Eastleach Turville, Gloucestershire (Note: East Leach would pass down to a Walter Devereux of Lyonshall, whose widow Cecilia, contested the ownership of these estates. Although, Cecilia lost her suit (Curia Regis Roll, 13 John, Michaelmas Term, membrane 6), some of East Leach was in the hands of the Devereux family, John Devereux, Lord of Munsley, as late as 1302 (Calender of Patent Rolls. 24 June, 31 Edward I (1302), membrane 20d).)
- Hatherop, Gloucestershire (Note: Hatherop appears to have passed to Stephen Devereux and his wife, Constance de Leigh. Stephen Devereux was the brother of Walter Devereux whose wife, Cecilia, is cited in the multiple litigations involving the Devereux lands around 1200. Following this Stephen's death, his widow would make many grants to the Abbey of Lacock which included lands in Hatherop.)
- Moreton Say, Shropshire
- Lowe, Shropshire
- Ewyas (Harold), Herefordshire (Note: This small piece of land is the closest of the Devereux grants to the Abbey Dore, and may be the location of the 'Woods of Huggesleg' granted by William Devereux's descendant, Roger Devereux, to the Abbey at the time of his death as referenced in A Descriptive Catalogue of Ancient Deeds in the Public Record Office (London; Eyre and Spottiswoode, 1890) in volume 1, page 277, B.673.)
- Putley, Herefordshire (Note: The Chapel at Putley was granted to the canons of Hereford by William Devereux. Cecilia Devereux, widow of Walter Devereux of Lyonshall, would contest the ownership of this Chapel and lose when the Canons produced the original charter. The final accord was published in: Monasticon Anglicanum. by Sir William Dugdale, knight, Volume the 6th part III. London: Published for the Proprietors by James Bohn, 12, King William Street, Charing Cross. 1846, page 1217. Cecelia Devereux still held Putley in the Testa de Nevil in 1242.)
- Street, Herefordshire (Note: Street Court (so named from its position on the old Roman road) was held under the Lady Cecily Devereux by Thomas de Street, in the reign of Edward I. Cecily was the widow of Walter Devereux of Lyonshall, great-great-grandson of William Devereux)
- Grendon, Herefordshire
- Elnodestune, Herefordshire (Note: This is thought to be the Devereux land later identified as Chanston, and it remained in their hands as late as 1308 when its ownership was contested between the sons of Hugh Devereux (De Banco Roll, Easter, 2 Edward II, No. 176, r. 51, Hereford).)
- Maund (Bryan), Herefordshire (Note: Part of the maund grants were held later as Whitechurch Maund by Baron John Devereux (died 1392/3).)
- (Rose)maund, Herefordshire
