= Admission on motion =

In the law of the United States, admission on motion refers to a procedure by which an attorney admitted to practice in one state or territory may obtain admission to practice in another state or territory without having to sit for the other jurisdiction's bar examination. Therefore, attorneys seeking admission on motion can be admitted to a jurisdiction without having to undergo any additional testing, except where the Multistate Professional Responsibility Examination (MPRE) is required. Instead, applicants simply file a motion or application with the state supreme court, board of bar examiners, or state bar association of the other jurisdiction, which typically must be accompanied by certificates of good standing from all other jurisdictions in which they are admitted and sufficient personal information to facilitate a background check of good moral character.

In August 2012, the American Bar Association's (ABA) Ethics 20/20 Commission published a report urging expansion of admission on motion, which noted that 40 jurisdictions (39 states and the District of Columbia) have already adopted it, and 11 states have not. In 2021, the National Conference of Bar Examiners and the ABA Section of Legal Education and Admissions to the Bar jointly published a Comprehensive Guide to Bar Admission Requirements. At the time of the 2021 publication, 43 jurisdictions (42 states and the District of Columbia) had rules that provided for admission on motion. Additionally, two of the jurisdictions that did not allow for admission on motion, permit it but only on a limited basis.

Some U.S. jurisdictions, such as Illinois, Massachusetts, Minnesota, Ohio, Tennessee, Texas, Wisconsin and the District of Columbia, will allow admission on motion of an attorney licensed in any state in lieu of taking their own bar examination, without the need to show reciprocity.

Some states, such as California, Florida, Louisiana, and South Carolina, do not allow reciprocity or admission by motion for attorneys licensed in any other jurisdiction.

== Requirements ==
=== Requirements In General ===
While admission on motion requirements typically vary by state, requirements for admission on motion basically fall under three categories: states that do not allow admission on motion; states that allow admission on motion conditioned on the attorney satisfying certain requirements; and states that allow admission on motion based on reciprocity. States that allow admission on motion based on reciprocity fall under two sub-categories: pure reciprocity and semi-pure reciprocity. Pure reciprocity states admit attorneys on motion based on similar rules of the jurisdiction that the attorney is transferring from. Therefore, an attorney that is barred in state A and seeking admission on motion in state B will not be granted admission if state A does not grant admission on motion to attorneys in state B. States that allow admission on motion based on semi-pure reciprocity, allow attorneys to be admitted on motion based on similar rules of the jurisdiction where the attorney is already admitted (the transferring jurisdiction) and conditioned on the attorney following additional rules or satisfying requirements.

=== Education ===
Many states require that an applicant for admission on motion be a graduate of an ABA-approved law school. However, some states allow exceptions for applicants that have graduated from foreign law schools. For example, Iowa allows graduates from foreign law schools to apply for admission on motion if they have engaged in quality, full-time practice of law in a U.S. jurisdiction for a minimum of five out of the last seven years. Other states make more specific exceptions to the requirement of graduating from an ABA-approved law school. New Hampshire allows graduates from one non-ABA-approved school in Massachusetts to be eligible to apply for admission on motion in New Hampshire. Indiana no longer requires graduation from an ABA-approved school if the applicant is seeking a Business Counsel License, but still requires it for applicants seeking a provisional license.

=== Years of Practice ===
Every state that allows admission on motion requires the applicant to have practiced law for a certain number of years, the fewest being three years, but some states require more. New York requires that applicants seeking admission on motion have practiced for at least five out of the last seven years. District of Columbia is the only jurisdiction that does not require a minimum number of years of practice. While a minimum of three years of good standing in a U.S. jurisdiction does make applicants eligible to seek admission on motion to the District of Columbia, applicants may also be eligible if they graduated from an ABA-approved law school or meet other specific requirements if they graduated from a non-ABA approved school.

In addition to the varying minimum number of years that states require, what constitutes as practice of law for admission on motion purposes also varies by state. Many states include a range of activities to count towards the years of practice requirement, such as teaching law, working at a government agency, practicing law within the military, working as in-house corporate counsel, and working as a judicial court of record. However, not all states are as inclusive regarding what work counts towards the years of practice requirement. The rules of West Virginia, for example, are silent as to whether years of working as an in-house corporate counsel count towards the years of practice requirement.

=== Fees ===
States require an applicant seeking admission on motion to pay a fee. The State Bar of New Jersey, for example, requires a non-refundable fee for admission by motion of $1,500. Out of all the states that allow admission on motion, New York has the lowest admission on motion fee at $400. Montana and New Mexico, on the other hand, require the highest admission on motion fee of $2,500. In addition to the admission on motion fees, some states require additional fees for character and fitness applications and/ or investigations. For example, Mississippi requires an admission on motion fee of $1,500 plus any fees required for the character and fitness assessment. Other states, like Kentucky and Alaska, include the character and fitness fee within the admission on motion fee.

=== Reciprocity ===
Many states only provide for admission on motion based on either an express reciprocal agreement or de facto reciprocity, which means limiting admission on motion to attorneys from jurisdictions that also offer admission on motion. Essentially, the admitting jurisdiction will allow an attorney to apply for admission on motion if the jurisdiction that the attorney is transferring from grants the same privileges to attorneys from the admitting jurisdiction. There are also circumstances where the transferring jurisdiction does offer admission on motion but has stricter requirements than the admitting jurisdiction. In situations like this where the transferring jurisdiction has stricter requirements, Georgia has decided to govern the applicant's admission by the requirements that a Georgia applicant would have to meet if applying for admission on motion to the transferring jurisdiction. Connecticut is another state that requires reciprocity but makes exceptions for full-time faculty members or clinical members at an accredited Connecticut law school.

=== Residency ===
In June 1988, the U.S. Supreme Court struck down a Virginia law that required lawyers seeking admission on motion to be permanent residents of the state. In Supreme Court of Virginia v. Friedman, Myrna E. Friedman was admitted to the Illinois Bar by bar examination in 1977 and admitted to the District of Columbia Bar by reciprocity in 1980. In 1986, Friedman applied for admission to the Virginia Bar on motion but at the time was a resident of Virginia's neighboring state, Maryland. Due to Virginia's statute Rule 1A:1, which at the time required applicants to be permanent residents of the Commonwealth, the Supreme Court of Virginia rejected Friedman's admission on motion because she was not a Virginia resident. Friedman challenged the Supreme Court of Virginia's ruling, arguing that the residency requirement of Rule 1A:1 violated the Privileges and Immunities Clause of the U.S. Constitution. The U.S. Supreme Court ruled in favor of Friedman, holding that Virginia's residency requirement for applicants seeking admission to the State's bar on motion violated the Privileges and Immunities Clause. The U.S. Supreme Court stated that non-residents had a protected privilege of practicing law on substantially similar terms as those enjoyed by residents of the state. Therefore, a state cannot discriminate against non-resident applicants for admission on motion solely because the applicant does not reside in the state.

Because practicing law is a protected privilege, a state cannot interfere with that privilege unless it shows that the means of interference are closely related to achieving a substantial state interest. Therefore, the practice of law is a constitutional privilege, but that does not mean it is without its limits. The state of Virginia just failed to meet its burden in showing that discriminating against non-resident applicants was closely related to a substantial state interest.

=== Additional Requirements ===
In addition to the usual minimum years of practice and reciprocity requirements, states can require applicants to meet additional criteria. For example, in addition to being barred in another U.S. jurisdiction, having practiced law for at least five out of the last seven years, and being admitting to a jurisdiction that extends reciprocity to New Jersey lawyers, applicants seeking admission by motion to the New Jersey Bar must also complete a course on ethics and professionalism. California requires that attorneys applying for admission by motion be in compliance with any court order for child or family support.

== Exceptions for Military Spouses ==
In 2011, the Military Spouse J.D. Network was formed to improve licensing accommodations for military spouses with law degrees. The Military Spouse J.D. Network drafted a model rule that allows attorneys who are in good standing in another jurisdiction to practice in a new jurisdiction if they are there because of their spouse's military orders. Currently, 40 states have adopted accommodations for military spouses, with the State of Idaho being the first to approve such accommodations. Idaho allows attorneys who are military spouses to be admitted to practice in the state of Idaho without taking the state bar examination if the attorney is there because of their spouse's military orders and if the attorney satisfies other general requirements, such as being admitted to and in good standing with a bar in another U.S. jurisdiction.

Louisiana is the most recent state to allow military spouse attorneys to practice in the state when present because of the spouse's active-duty military orders. However, Louisiana places a broad supervision requirement on military spouse attorneys admitted to practice by requiring them to be supervised by a local attorney. Other states, like New York, do not have a Military Spouse Temporary Practice rule but offer other ways for attorneys to gain permission to practice in its jurisdiction. For example, an applicant who is in New York because of their spouse's military orders could file a petition to waive strict compliance with the rules if the rules would cause an undue hardship on the applicant.

== See also ==
- Comity
