= Morguard Investments Ltd v De Savoye =

- Supreme Court of Canada

Hearing: April 23, 1990 Judgment: December 20, 1990
- Full case name: Douglas De Savoye v Morguard Investments Limited and Credit Foncier Trust Company
- Citations: [1990] 3 SCR 1077
- Docket No.: 21116
- Ruling: De Savoye appeal dismissed

Holding
- A foreign judgment from another province will be enforced where there is a "real and substantial connection" to the forum

Court membership
- Chief Justice: Brian Dickson; Puisne Justices: Antonio Lamer, Bertha Wilson, Gérard La Forest, Claire L'Heureux-Dubé, John Sopinka, Charles Gonthier, Peter Cory, Beverley McLachlin

Reasons given
- Unanimous reasons by: La Forest J

Morguard Investments Ltd v De Savoye, [1990] 3 SCR 1077 is the leading decision of the Supreme Court of Canada on the enforcement of extraprovincial judgments. The Court held that the standard for enforcing a default judgment from a different province is not the same as if it were from another country; rather the Court adopts the test from Indyka v Indyka, [1969] 1 AC 33 (HL) and Moran v Pyle National (Canada) Ltd, [1975] 1 SCR 393 where there must be a "real and substantial connection" between the petitioner and the country or territory exercising jurisdiction.

== Background ==
De Savoye, the appellant, was the mortgagor of a property in Alberta and resided in British Columbia. The mortgage defaulted and the respondents brought action in Alberta, for the land they had mortgaged in that same province.

The appellant chose not to appear or defend his actions. The respondents obtained judgment ex juris in the foreclosure action, and then obtained orders for the judicial sale of the properties. They then initiated separate action in the British Columbia Supreme Court to enforce the Alberta judgments for the shortfall.

== Issue ==
The main question placed before the court was the degree of recognition that should be accorded by the courts of one province to the judgments of another for a personal action brought forward in the second province when the defendant did not reside there.

== Reasons of the court ==
Justice La Forest wrote the unanimous reasons of court for dismissing the appeal. After surveying the case law in both England and the United States he noted that the old common law rules, based on territoriality, sovereignty, independence and attornment, were outdated. La Forest argued that a modern approach based on the principle of comity ("the deference and respect due by other states to the actions of a state legitimately taken within its territory") and reciprocity were needed a basis of recognizing foreign judgments. The infringement on the nation's sovereignty is justified where there is mutual convenience between states. The earlier views of distrusting the justice system of other countries, he argued, was outdated. Instead, he emphasized that the business community operates on a world economy and so the law must accommodate "the flow of wealth, skills and people across state lines".

On the basis of Canada's federal system comity should be even stronger between provinces, which share a much deeper bond than nations, based on shared citizenship and a common market. In that regard,

These arrangements themselves speak to the strong need for the enforcement throughout the country of judgments given in one province. But that is not all. The Canadian judicial structure is so arranged that any concerns about differential quality of justice among the provinces can have no real foundation. All superior court judges ‑‑ who also have superintending control over other provincial courts and tribunals ‑‑ are appointed and paid by the federal authorities. And all are subject to final review by the Supreme Court of Canada, which can determine when the courts of one province have appropriately exercised jurisdiction in an action and the circumstances under which the courts of another province should recognize such judgments.

...

These various constitutional and sub-constitutional arrangements and practices make unnecessary a "full faith and credit" clause such as exists in other federations, such as the United States and Australia. The existence of these clauses, however, does indicate that a regime of mutual recognition of judgments across the country is inherent in a federation.

...

For present purposes, it is sufficient to say that, in my view, the application of the underlying principles of comity and private international law must be adapted to the situations where they are applied, and that in a federation this implies a fuller and more generous acceptance of the judgments of the courts of other constituent units of the federation. In short, the rules of comity or private international law as they apply between the provinces must be shaped to conform to the federal structure of the Constitution.

For La Forest, the concern was to define an outer limit of comity. The solution was to limit the jurisdiction to where there is a "real and substantial connection" between the action and the province. He intentionally left the meaning of "real and substantial connection" open, stating:

I am aware, of course, that the possibility of being sued outside the province of his residence may pose a problem for a defendant. But that can occur in relation to actions in rem now. In any event, this consideration must be weighed against the fact that the plaintiff under the English rules may often find himself subjected to the inconvenience of having to pursue his debtor to another province, however just, efficient or convenient it may be to pursue an action where the contract took place or the damage occurred. It seems to me that the approach of permitting suit where there is a real and substantial connection with the action provides a reasonable balance between the rights of the parties. It affords some protection against being pursued in jurisdictions having little or no connection with the transaction or the parties. In a world where even the most familiar things we buy and sell originate or are manufactured elsewhere, and where people are constantly moving from province to province, it is simply anachronistic to uphold a "power theory" or a single situs for torts or contracts for the proper exercise of jurisdiction.

== Aftermath ==
The test established in this case was later elaborated on by the Court of Appeal for Ontario in Muscutt v Courcelles, where a list of eight factors was given to be considered when determining whether a real and substantial connection exists:

1. the connection between the forum and the plaintiff's claim;
2. the connection between the forum and the defendant;
3. unfairness to the defendant in assuming jurisdiction;
4. unfairness to the plaintiff in not assuming jurisdiction;
5. the involvement of other parties to the suit;
6. the court's willingness to recognize and enforce an extraprovincial judgment rendered on the same jurisdictional basis;
7. whether the case is interprovincial or international in nature; and
8. comity and the standards of jurisdiction, recognition and enforcement prevailing elsewhere.

The Morguard principles were elaborated upon in subsequent cases, notably in:

- Hunt v T&N plc (where the Morguard principles were held to apply to constitutional challenges as well), and
- Beals v Saldanha (where the "real and substantial connection" test was applied in an international setting)

== See also ==
- List of Supreme Court of Canada cases
