= Nicholas II Devereux of Chanston =

Anglo-Norman nobleman

- Born: circa 1220
- Died: circa 1265
- Spouses: Isabel; Joan
- Issue: Hugh Devereux of Chanston; Isabel Devereux; Robert Devereux; John Devereux, Lord of Munsley
- Father: Nicholas Devereux of Chanston

Nicholas Devereux II of Chanston (Vowchurch) was an Anglo-Norman nobleman living during the reigns of Henry III of England. The Devereux were a prominent knightly family along the Welsh Marches during the thirteenth century, and Nicholas would play an integral role in attempts to control the Welsh Marches during the thirteenth century.

== Ancestry ==
Nicholas Devereux the Younger was born about 1220, the son of Nicholas Devereux the Elder of Chanston and an unknown woman. His father was a member of the retinue of Walter de Lacy, Lord of Meath, and had served as his Steward of Meath. He probably spent his youth on his fathers lands in Herefordshire.

== Career ==
Nicholas Devereux paid 1 mark for a pone (Note: A writ in law used by the superior courts to remove cases from inferior courts.) in March 1246 to remove a plea from the county court of Herefordshire to Westminster.

In October 1252 Nicholas of Ebroicis filed a plea regarding 6 armed-men of Walter Kingston that had destroyed his corn in Enlatheston (Chanston). Walter Kingston failed to appear in court, and orders were issued to the Bailiff of Nicholas’ district to take into hand Walter, Balearic Dunkers and Phillip Wayne.

Following the death of Arnold de Bosco, Justice of the Forest, the king appointed Peter de Neyreford and Nicholas de Rummeseye in March 1255 to inquire into trespasses in the forests, and to sell a part of the woods for the relief of the king's debts in the forests of Southampton, Wiltshire, Dorset, Somerset, Gloucester and Hereford. In Hereford, the sheriff was instructed to have the knights, Nicholas Devereux and Henry le Rus, meet with Neyreford and Rummeseye and assist with the execution of these orders. On 4 July 1255 Sir Nicholas Devereux was ordered to the send to the king as quickly as possible the money that had been obtained from the selling of the king's woods toward the side of Nottinghamshire. If he failed to do so, the sheriff of Hereford was to compel him.

Nicholas Devereux, like his cousins Sir Walter Devereux of Bodenham and Bromwich and the Marcher Lord William Devereux, supported the baronial cause during the later part of the Second Barons' War. It is probable that Nicholas, like his cousin William, died at the Battle of Evesham on 4 August 1265. His eldest son, Hugh Devereux, was an adult at the time, and he was granted on 4 May 1266 safe conduct until midsummer for coming to the king’s court. Hugh probably supported the king as his inheritance was not recorded as subject to the Dictum of Kenilworth. John Devereux, Nicholas’ son by his second wife, would be required to redeem his inheritance in 1279.

== Marriage ==
Nicholas Devereux married a woman named Isabel, and they had children:

- Hugh Devereux of Chanston
- Isabel Devereux (Note: Isabel Devereux was alive and married in 1292 when she was involved with a writ of waste directed at her step-mother, Joan, on land that she held the reversion rights to. She is probably the wife of Walter de la Walls who was involved in another court case of John Devereux on 1 July 1289.)

Nicholas married a second time to a woman named Joan and had children:

- Robert Devereux (Note: Robert Devereux held lands in Overleye (Netherleye) in the hundred of Stretford, county Herefordshire, of the honor of Wigmore from Edmund Mortimer. He also held lands for 1 knight’s fee in Eastleche in the hundred of Brightwell’s Barrow, county Gloucester, from William Comyn. On 12 June 1302 the king’s escheator took homage from Robert Devereux for the lands he held of the king in chief following their surrender by Roger le Bigod, earl of Norfolk. He had died by 1303 when his brother, John Devereux, was shown holding Eastleche on the subsidy rolls. On 26 November 1312 there is reference to Andrew le Chaloner being held in the king’s prison of Brugge for the death of Robert Devereux.)
- John Devereux, Lord of Munsley

== General References ==
- Robinson, Charles J. A History of the Castles of Herefordshire and their Lords. (Great Britain; Antony Rowe LTD, 2002). Page 125-129
