= Moran v Pyle National (Canada) Ltd =

Judgement of the Supreme Court of Canada

Moran v Pyle National (Canada) Ltd, [1975] 1 S.C.R. 393 is a leading Canadian case on conflict of laws decided by the Supreme Court of Canada. The decision represented the biggest transformation in the law of conflicts for over 15 years until the later case of Morguard Investments Ltd. v. De Savoye (1990).

A Saskatchewan man was killed in his home while replacing a light bulb that was manufactured by the defendant in Ontario. The Court allowed the widow to sue in tort within Saskatchewan despite the defendant not having any presence in Saskatchewan.

The Court adopted a more modern and liberal interpretation of jurisdiction and the location of a tort that balanced fairness between the parties. Justice Dickson, on the issue of whether the Saskatchewan court could have jurisdiction over the issue, held that

Generally speaking, in determining where a tort has been committed, it is unnecessary, and unwise, to have resort to any arbitrary set of rules. The place of acting and the place of harm theories are too arbitrary and inflexible to be recognized in contemporary jurisprudence. ... By tendering his products in the market place directly or through normal distributive channels, a manufacturer ought to assume the burden of defending those products wherever they cause harm as long as the forum into which the manufacturer is taken is one that he reasonably ought to have had in his contemplation when he so tendered his goods.

— pp.408-409

== See also ==
- List of Supreme Court of Canada cases
