= Hugh Devereux of Chanston =

Anglo-Norman nobleman

- Born: circa 1245
- Died: circa 1307
- Issue: Nicholas Devereux; John Devereux; Parson Hugh Devereux
- Father: Nicholas II Devereux of Chanston
- Mother: Isabel

Hugh Devereux of Chanston (Vowchurch) (c. 1245 – c. 1307) was an Anglo-Norman nobleman living during the reign of Edward I of England. The Devereux were a prominent knightly family along the Welsh Marches during the thirteenth century, and Hugh played an integral role in attempts to control the Welsh Marches.

== Ancestry ==
Hugh Devereux was born about 1245, the son of Nicholas II Devereux of Chanston and a woman named Isabel. His grandfather was a member of the retinue of Walter de Lacy, Lord of Meath, and on his death the fealty of the Devereux estates of Chanston were transferred to Walter's granddaughter, Margaret de Lacy, and her husband, John de Verdon. His father had gone over to the Baronial cause towards the end of the Second Barons' War, but by this time Hugh was established in his own right and remained loyal to the king.

== Career ==
Following his father's death probably at the Battle of Evesham, Hugh Devereux was granted safe conduct by the king on 4 May 1266 lasting through midsummer to allow him to come to court.

Between 1276 and 1277 Edward I suppressed a minor rebellion in Wales. On 18 August 1277 Hugh Devereux was provided protection with a clause volumus until Michaelmas (29 September) as he was already on the king's service in Wales.

On 2 January 1290 Devereux, John Pychard, and Robert de Hauford acknowledged owing a 7 marks debt to Thomas de Tuberville with collateral being their lands and chattels in Herefordshire, Oxfordshire, and Berkshire. He was identified as Lord of Chanston on 8 December 1293 when recorded as taking a loan of 4 pounds and 7 shillings from Richard, son of Roger de Orleton, a merchant of Herefordshire.

On 9 March 1299 Richard Swinefield, Bishop of Hereford, requested that the King order the sheriff of Hereford (Miles Pichard) to eject armed men led by Hugh Devereux and his sons, and Richard Dansey who had taken possession of Turnastone Church, and the chapel and rectory of Saint Leonard's in county Herefordshire. They were in the Golden Vale, and a short distance from his manor of Chanston. Following resolution of this event, a John Devereux (Note: This probably was Hugh Devereux’s son, John. He was replaced in Turnastone on 2 February 1301, and placed in the rectory of Hope Mansel (Herefordshire) on 21 October 1301) was inducted into the living on 24 November 1300 on presentation by Richard Dansy.

About 1304 Hugh granted his son, Nicholas III Devereux and his heirs, 1/3 of the manor of Chanston as tenant for a term of three years. The land in the village of Aynaldestone had been part of the agreed upon dower for Hugh's mother, Isabel, upon her marriage to Nicholas II Devereux as his first wife.

About 1305 Hugh made grants of land from the manor of Chanston to his half-brother, John Devereux, and John's wife, Eva. John Devereux was the son of Nicholas II Devereux and his second wife, Joan. Around this time Hugh Devereux also granted 5 acres of Chanston manor to David le Seriaunt to be held for 2 years, and as part of these transactions there were issues with the rent owed by the John and Sarah Raguns and the control of 12 acres of meadow in the hands of Maud le Bret.

== Marriage ==
Hugh Devereux married an unknown woman, and they had children:

- Nicholas III Devereux of Chanston (Note: Nicholas III Devereux married a woman named Lucy, probably the daughter of Thomas Corbet of Tasley, and had two legitimate sons, Nicholas IV Devereux of Chanston and Walter Devereux, and an illegitimate son, John Devereux. Nicholas III Devereux died about 1311. Nicholas IV Devereux of Chanston is probably the Nicholas Devereux that posted bond for the good behavior of William Devereux of Frome (1314-1384), and had a son, Hugh Devereux of Chanston, who was alive in 1350)
- John Devereux
- Parson Hugh Devereux (Note: Hugh Devereux entered the clergy, and was parson of the Church of Kinardesly who was granted a clause volumus by the king and restoration of the church on agreement to pay a yearly fee)

== Death ==
Hugh Devereux died about 1307.

In 1308 Hugh's eldest son, Nicholas III Devereux, and his co–parceners David le Seriaunt, John and Sarah Ragun with their son John, and Maud (widow of Richard le Bret) were called to court to provide evidence for their claim to portions of Chanston manor. Part of the manor had previously been granted in court by Hugh Devereux to his brother, John Devereux and his wife Eva. In 1308/9 John and Eva Devereux filed a writ to compel these individuals to turn over the rights to these lands for which they held the reversion as granted by Hugh Devereux. Nicholas III Devereux claimed his father had granted him these lands prior to the grant of reversion to John and Eva. The defendants were allowed not to attorn due to one of the co-parceners not being an adult, and therefore he could not be disinherited while under age.
