= Hilton v. Guyot =

- Supreme Court of the United States

Argued April 10, 1894 Decided June 3, 1895
- Full case name: Henry Hilton v. Gustave Bertin Guyot, et al.
- Citations: 159 U.S. 113 (more) 16 S. Ct. 139; 40 L. Ed. 95; 1895 U.S. LEXIS 2294

Holding
- The enforcement of a foreign judgment rests on whether there is comity with the jurisdiction from which it is issued, based on criteria articulated by the Court.

Court membership
- Chief Justice Melville Fuller Associate Justices Stephen J. Field · John M. Harlan; Horace Gray · David J. Brewer; Henry B. Brown · George Shiras Jr. Howell E. Jackson · Edward D. White

Case opinions
- Majority: Gray, joined by Field, Brown, Shiras, White
- Dissent: Fuller, joined by Harlan, Brewer, Jackson

Hilton v. Guyot, 159 U.S. 113 (1895), was a United States Supreme Court case where the Court ruled that the recognition and enforceability of a foreign judgment rested on the "comity of nations," namely whether there would be any reciprocity and mutual recognition by the foreign jurisdiction from which the judgment was issued.

Hilton established the fundamental basis for the recognition and enforcement of foreign judgments in the United States, remaining "the most detailed exposition of any American court" on this principle. It is also viewed as the quintessential statement of comity in international law, and is one of the earliest decisions of the U.S. Supreme Court to assert that international law is part of U.S. law.

== Background ==
Hilton and Libbey, U.S. citizens conducting business in Paris, France, were sued in French court by Guyot, the administrator of a French firm, for sums allegedly owed to that firm. They appeared and litigated the merits before the French court, which rendered a judgment against them that was affirmed by a higher court and became final. Guyot sought to enforce that judgment in federal district court in New York, which held that the French judgment was enforceable without retrial on the merits. Hilton and Libbey subsequently appealed to the U.S. Supreme Court.

== Opinion of the Court ==
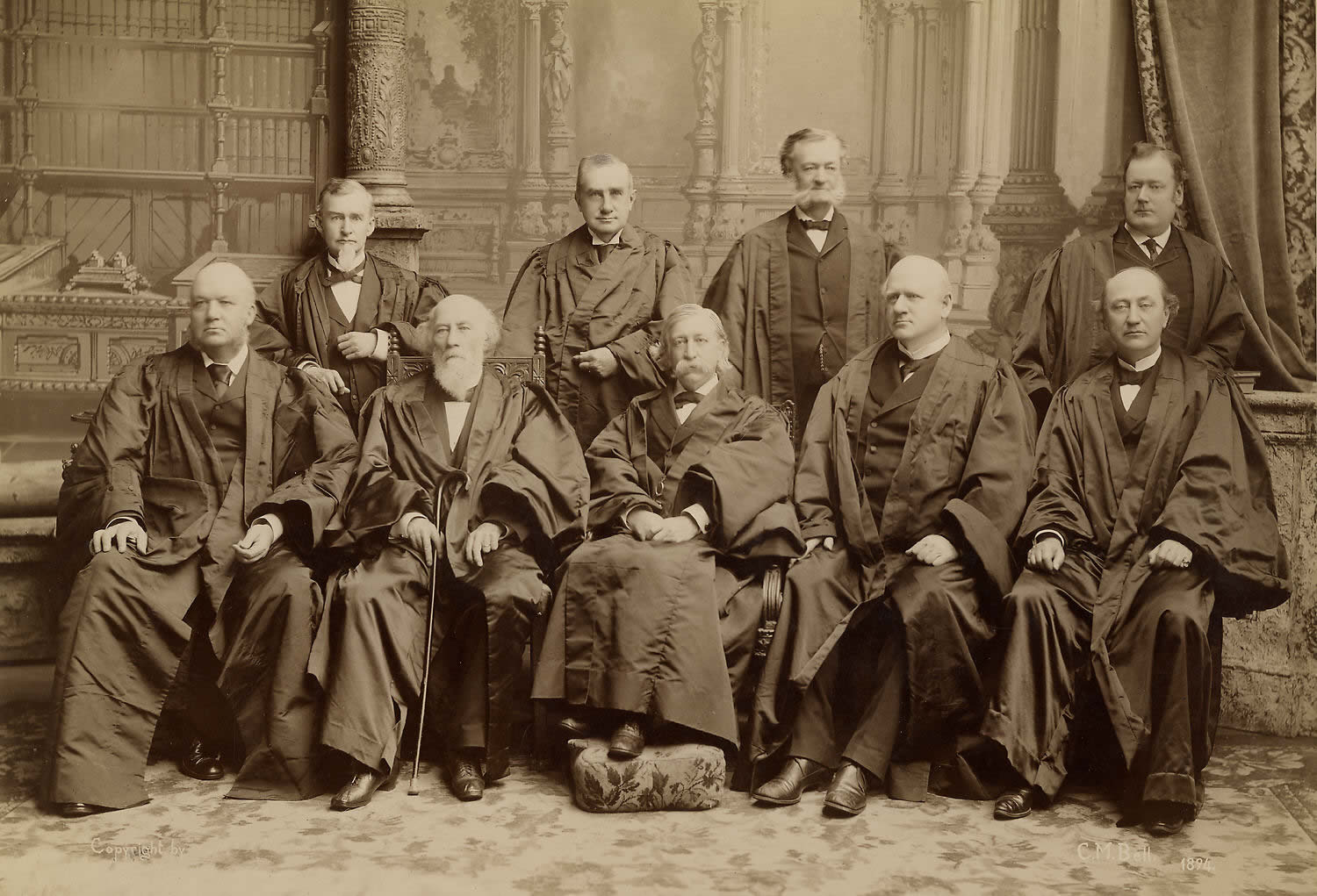
The Fuller Court.

The central question before the Court was whether a judgment had force beyond the limits of the sovereign jurisdiction from which its authority derived. In finding that there was no applicable treaty or domestic statute from which an answer could be derived, the Court determined that it was incumbent on the judiciary to ascertain the law, based on guidance from "judicial decisions, from the works of jurists and commentators, and from the acts and usages of civilized nations."

In an opinion authored by Justice Horace Gray, the Court, drawing upon both domestic and international legal sources, concluded that whether any foreign judgment was to be enforced in the U.S. rested on whether there was comity between the U.S. and the foreign jurisdiction in question. In articulating this position, the Court set forth the general standard for making this determination and for what defined international comity.

No law has any effect, of its own force, beyond the limits of the sovereignty from which its authority is derived. The extent to which the law of one nation, as put in force within its territory, whether by executive order, by legislative act, or by judicial decree, shall be allowed to operate within the dominion of another nation, depends upon what our greatest jurists have been content to call 'the comity of nations.' Although the phrase has been often criticised, no satisfactory substitute has been suggested. 'Comity,' in the legal sense, is neither a matter of absolute obligation, on the one hand, nor of mere courtesy and good will, upon the other. But it is the recognition which one nation allows within its territory to the legislative, executive or judicial acts of another nation, having due regard both to international duty and convenience, and to the rights of its own citizens, or of other persons who are under the protection of its laws.

Applying this standard, the Court reasoned, after examining relevant French laws and judicial decisions, that a French court would not have recognized a foreign judgment without having first considered its merits. Therefore, based on the notion of reciprocity derived from international comity, U.S. courts should similarly examine the merits of any judgment prior to ruling on its enforcement. The judgment of the U.S. circuit court was subsequently reversed and the case remanded for retrial.

The Court's opinion is notable for drawing heavily from international legal sources, specifically the laws and practices of over a dozen nations all over the world regarding the recognition and enforcement of foreign judgments. Thus, Hilton was one of the first Supreme Court cases to apply customary international law—the prevailing practices of states—in making its determination as to non-U.S. judgments:

It appears, therefore, that there is hardly a civilized nation on either continent, which, by its general law, allows conclusive effect to an executory foreign judgment for the recovery of money. In France, and in a few smaller States — Norway, Portugal, Greece, Monaco, and Hayti — the merits of the controversy are reviewed, as of course, allowing to the foreign judgment, at the most, no more effect than of being prima facie evidence of the justice of the claim. In the great majority of the countries on the continent of Europe — in Belgium, Holland, Denmark, Sweden, Germany, in many cantons of Switzerland, in Russia and Poland, in Roumania, in Austria and Hungary, (perhaps in Italy,) and in Spain — as well as in Egypt, in Mexico, and in a great part of South America, the judgment rendered in a foreign country is allowed the same effect only as the courts of that country allow to the judgments of the country in which the judgment in question is sought to be executed.

== See also ==
- Foreign-Country Money Judgments Recognition Act (a 1962 Uniform State Act promulgated by the Uniform Law Commissioners)
- The Paquete Habana, a U.S. Supreme Court decision in 1900, also authored by Justice Gray, that ruled that international law is part of U.S. law.
