= Reciprocity (international relations) =

Principle in international relations and treaties

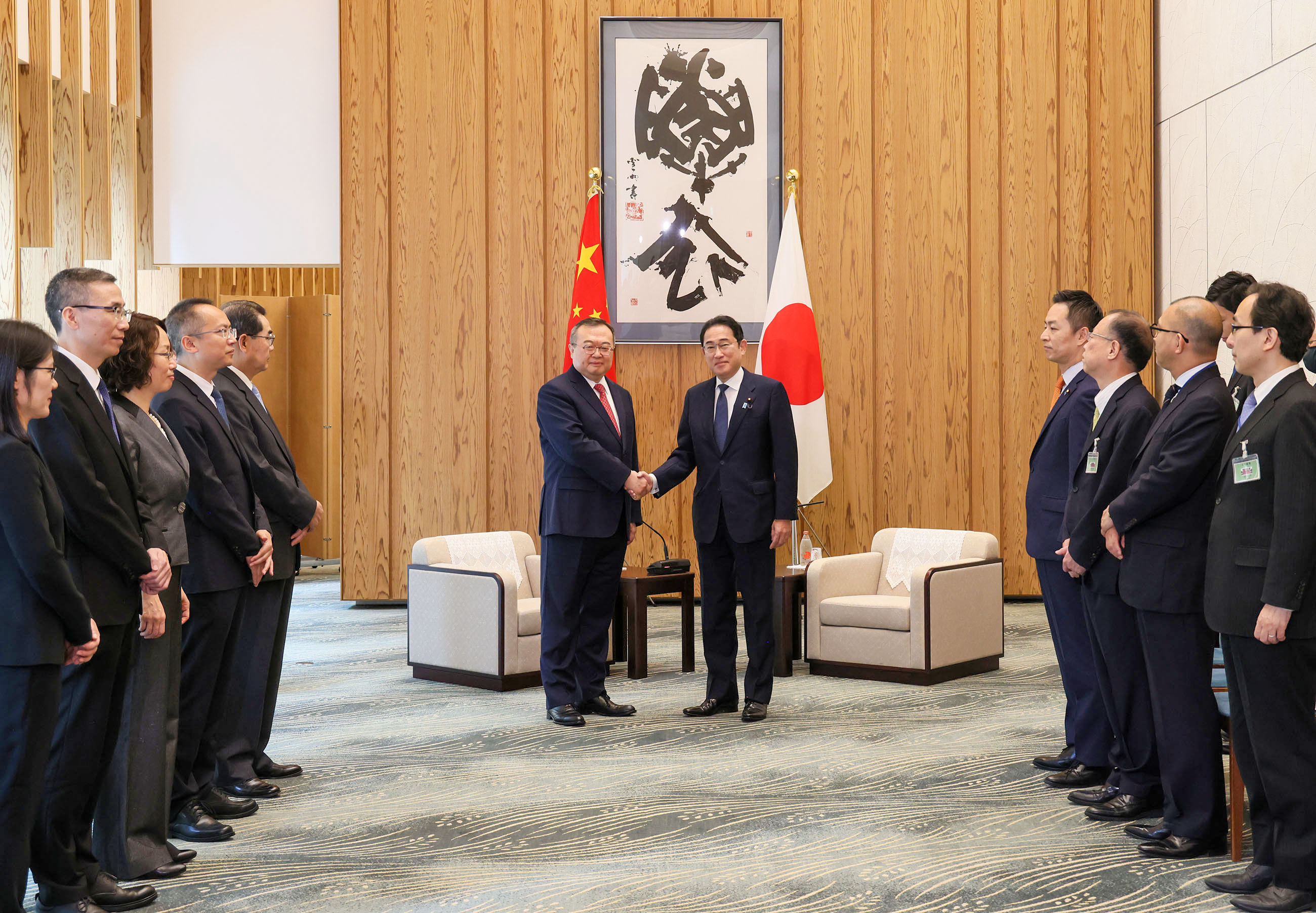
Japan's Prime Minister Fumio Kishida welcomed the Head of the International Department of the CCP Liu Jianchao at the Prime Minister's Office in 2024. The Chinese calligraphy on the wall writes "Jiěyī" (Chinese: 解衣; lit. 'undress'), a term that means sharing each other and tiding over the difficulty, used to stress the "strategic, reciprocal" relationship between the two countries.

In international relations and treaties, the principle of reciprocity states that favors, benefits, or penalties that are granted by one state to the citizens or legal entities of another, should be returned in kind.

For example, reciprocity has been used in the reduction of tariffs, the grant of copyrights to foreign authors, the mutual recognition and enforcement of judgments, and the relaxation of travel restrictions and visa requirements.

The principle of reciprocity also governs agreements on extradition.

== Specific and diffuse reciprocity ==
Several theorists have drawn a distinction between "specific reciprocity" and "diffuse reciprocity". While specific reciprocity is exemplified by international trade negotiations, as suggested above, diffuse reciprocity points to a wider institutionalisation of trust. Through consistent cooperation in an international society, states are seen as building generally accepted standards of behaviour. These general standards exert their own normative pressure on state action, contributing to the development of long-term obligations between states which stress cooperation. Thus in a system of diffuse reciprocity, states need not seek the immediate benefit guaranteed by specific reciprocity, but can act in the confidence that their cooperative actions will be repaid in the long run.

== Reciprocity (International Relations) ==
Reciprocity being the foundation for many bonds of trust between people can be applied in various ways and within various topics. When thinking of reciprocity in relation to international relations, it is clear to see that exchanges play a big role. An example of international relations reciprocity would be trade agreements. Trade agreements make it easier for countries to trade with one another as even big and small countries can end up trading with one another, leading to it benefitting both countries. There is also room for negotiation with the trades being made, as the small countries, usually being at the disadvantage, can now have that power over the bigger countries that can offer more. Security alliances can also be seen as an example of reciprocity within international relations as both countries are in agreement to help one another in a time of military need. NATO is one of those organizations where countries come together to come up with different policies that help the countries in it, with one of those being a type of security agreement where they will aid one another in a time of military conflict. Again, reciprocity can be used within many topics as gift giving is universal within all.

== See also ==
- Comity
- Admission on motion, a specialized form of reciprocity concerning admission to the bar of certain U.S. states
