= Enforcement of foreign judgments =

Recognition of court judgments in other jurisdictions

In law, the enforcement of foreign judgments is the recognition and enforcement in one jurisdiction of judgments rendered in another ("foreign") jurisdiction. Foreign judgments may be recognized based on bilateral or multilateral treaties or understandings, or unilaterally without an express international agreement.

== Definition of terms ==
The "recognition" of a foreign judgment occurs when the court of one country or jurisdiction accepts a judicial decision made by the courts of another "foreign" country or jurisdiction, and issues a judgment in substantially identical terms without rehearing the substance of the original lawsuit.

In English law, there is a clear distinction between recognition of foreign judgments, and enforcement of foreign judgments. Recognition means treating the claim as having been determined in favour of one of the litigating parties. This is an acknowledgment of foreign competence and of the settling of a dispute, known as res judicata. Enforcement, by contrast, is the implementation of the judgment.

In American legal terminology, a "foreign" judgment means a judgment from another state in the United States or from a foreign country. To differentiate between the two, more precise terminology used is "foreign-country judgment" (for judgments from another country) and "foreign sister-state judgment" (from a different state within the United States).

Once a foreign judgment is recognized, the party who was successful in the original case can then seek its enforcement in the recognizing country. If the foreign judgment is a money judgment and the debtor has assets in the recognizing jurisdiction, the judgment creditor has access to all the enforcement remedies as if the case had originated in the recognizing country, e.g. garnishment, judicial sale, etc. If some other form of judgment was obtained, e.g. affecting status, granting injunctive relief, etc., the recognizing court will make whatever orders are appropriate to make the original judgment effective.

Foreign judgments may be recognized either unilaterally or based on principles of comity, i.e. mutual deference between courts in different countries. In English courts, the basis of the enforcement of foreign judgments is not comity, but the doctrine of obligation.

Between two different States in the United States, enforcement is generally required under the Full Faith and Credit Clause (Article IV, Section 1) of the U.S. Constitution, which compels a State to give effect to another State's judgment as if it were local. This usually requires some sort of an abbreviated application on notice, or docketing. Between one State in the United States, and a foreign country, e.g. Canada, the prevailing concept is comity. The Court in the United States, in most cases, will unilaterally enforce the foreign judgment, without proof of diplomatic reciprocity, either under judge-made law or under specific statutes.

Recognition will generally be denied if the judgment is substantively incompatible with basic legal principles in the recognizing country. For example, U.S. courts, in accordance with the Securing the Protection of our Enduring and Established Constitutional Heritage Act, are prohibited from recognizing or enforcing foreign libel judgments against any United States person unless the foreign country in which the judgement was made protects freedom of speech to at least the same degree as the United States and the foreign court's conduct of the case in which the judgement was reached respected the due process guarantees of the U.S. Constitution to the same extent as a U.S. court would have.

== Exercise of jurisdiction in recognition cases ==
If the country that issued the judgment and the country where recognition is sought are not parties to the Hague Convention on Foreign Judgments in Civil and Commercial Matters (as of December 2017, only ratified by Albania, Cyprus, Kuwait, the Netherlands and Portugal), the Brussels regime (all European Union countries, as well as Iceland, Norway and Switzerland) or a similar treaty or convention providing for the routine of registration and enforcement between states, the courts of most states will accept jurisdiction to hear cases for the recognition and enforcement of judgments awarded by the courts of another state if the defendant or relevant assets are physically located within their territorial boundaries. Whether recognition will be given is determined by the lex fori, i.e. the domestic law of the court where recognition is sought, and the principles of comity. The following issues are considered:

- Whether the foreign court properly accepted personal jurisdiction over the defendant;
- Whether the defendant was properly served with notice of the proceedings and given a reasonable opportunity to be heard which raises general principles of natural justice and will frequently be judged by international standards (hence, the rules for service on a non-resident defendant outside the jurisdiction must match general standards and the fact that the first instance court's rules were followed will be irrelevant if the international view is that the local system is unjust);
- Whether the proceedings were tainted with fraud; and
- Whether the judgment offends the public policy of the local state.

There is a general reluctance to enforce foreign judgments which involve multiple or punitive damages. In this context, it is noted that the U.S. is not a signatory to any treaty or convention on foreign judgments and there are no proposals for this position to change. When it comes to seeking the enforcement of U.S. judgments in foreign courts, many states are uncomfortable with the amount of money damages awarded by U.S. courts which consistently exceed the compensation available in those states. Further, the fact that the U.S. courts sometimes claim extraterritorial jurisdiction offends other states' conceptions of sovereignty. Consequently, it can be difficult to persuade some courts to enforce some U.S. judgments. The Hague choice of court convention provides for the recognition of judgement given by the court chosen by the parties in civil and commercial cases in all other parties to the convention. The convention has, as of 2013, not entered into force. Regarding maintenance obligations, the Hague Maintenance Convention (in force between Albania, Bosnia and Herzegovina, and Norway) provides for recognition of all kinds of maintenance-related judgements (including child support).

=== United States ===
If the time to appeal in the court of origin has lapsed, and the judgment has become final, the holder of a foreign judgment, decree or order may file suit before a competent court in the U.S. which will determine whether to give effect to the foreign judgment. A local version of the Uniform Foreign Money Judgments Recognition Act applies in most states, for example in California, 13 U.L.A. 149 (1986).

A judgment rendered in a "sister" state or a territory of the U.S. is also referred to as a "foreign judgment". 48 states, the District of Columbia, the Northern Mariana Islands, and the U.S. Virgin Islands have adopted the Uniform Enforcement of Foreign Judgments Act (UEFJA), 13 U.L.A. 261 (1986), which requires the states and the territories to give effect to the judgments of other states and territories, if an exemplified copy of the foreign judgment is registered with the clerk of a court of competent jurisdiction along with an affidavit stating certain things. The only U.S. states which have not adopted the Uniform Enforcement of Foreign Judgments Act are California and Vermont.

New York and Connecticut are two of a small minority of U.S. jurisdictions that do not simply allow a judgment creditor to file a foreign judgment from a sister state if the judgment was obtained by default (meaning the other side never showed up for to contest its entry in the other state by, for example, defending himself at trial) or the judgment was obtained by confession (meaning the other side signed paperwork allowing a judgment to be entered against him). Instead, a party wishing to domesticate the foreign default judgment or foreign judgment obtained by confession must bring another action in New York "on the judgment" where the relief sought is to have the foreign judgment domesticated in New York. Moreover, a quicker "motion-action" procedure is available in New York where the owner of the foreign default judgment/judgment by confession files a summons and notice of motion for summary judgment in lieu of complaint.

When seeking to enforce a judgment in or from a state that has not adopted the Uniform Act, the holder of the judgment files a suit known as a "domestication" action. Since the Full Faith and Credit Clause of the U.S. constitution requires that states honor the judgments of other states, the domestication of a judgment from another state is generally a formality, even in the absence of the expedited procedure under the UEFJA.

To solve the problem of libel tourism, the SPEECH Act makes foreign libel judgments unenforceable in U.S. courts, unless those judgments are compliant with the U.S. First Amendment. The act was passed by the 111th United States Congress and signed into law by President Barack Obama.

==== Exceptions ====
A state may not enforce a foreign-country judgment in the following cases:

- The judgment was not rendered by an impartial tribunal under procedures compatible with the requirements of due process of law;
- The foreign court did not have personal jurisdiction over the defendant;
- The foreign court did not have jurisdiction over the subject matter;
- The defendant did not receive notice of the proceedings in sufficient time to enable him to defend;
- The judgment was obtained by fraud;
- The judgment is repugnant to the public policy of the state where enforcement is sought;
- The judgment conflicts with another final and conclusive judgment;
- The proceeding in the foreign court was contrary to an agreement between the parties under which the dispute was to be settled;
- In the case of jurisdiction based only on personal service, the foreign court was an inconvenient forum for the trial;
- The judgment seeks to enforce the revenue and taxation laws of a foreign jurisdiction;
- The judgment was obtained through an illegal transaction;
- The judgment is not conclusive.

=== Canada ===
In order to be recognized and enforced in Canada under the common law, foreign judgments must meet three conditions.

First, foreign judgments will only be enforced in Canada if they stem from a final and conclusive decision. "Final and conclusive" refers to any judgment which can no longer be modified by the foreign court; the court must have no power to vary the judgment or to retry the issue. However, the judgment may still be appealed in the court system which issued it, and if an action is launched to enforce that judgment in Canada, the Canadian judge may issue a stay pending the outcome of the appeal. There is no automatic right to a stay given a pending appeal in the foreign jurisdiction, nor does the fact that a case is appealable have any bearing on its finality and thus enforceability. Factors that courts consider when contemplating a stay in this circumstance include whether the appeal was brought promptly and whether either party would suffer a loss as a result of the stay. In Quebec, however, a foreign judgment that is still subject to appeal cannot be enforced in Canada, even if it can be enforced in the foreign jurisdiction.

Second, the foreign judgment must either be a pecuniary judgment for a specified sum, or a non-monetary judgment that the enforcing court agrees to enforce. Judgments that stem from penal laws of a foreign country will not be enforced, nor will Canadian courts collect revenue or tax on behalf of foreign states.

Third, the foreign court that issued the judgment must have had jurisdictional competence over the subject matter or defendant. The foreign court's jurisdiction is not assessed by its own rules but by tests specific to Canadian recognition and enforcement. The Canadian enforcing court is not required to have a connection to the subject matter of the action or the defendant.

==== Determining the jurisdiction of the foreign court ====
Whether the foreign court had jurisdiction over the matter is assessed using one of three tests. The first two – presence of the defendant in the jurisdiction and submission of the defendant to the foreign court – are traditional tests that have their roots in English common law. The third and now most common test, real and substantial connection, was recognized in the Supreme Court of Canada's 1990 decision Morguard Investments Ltd v De Savoye.

===== Presence =====
The defendant's presence in the foreign jurisdiction is established if they were within the jurisdiction when the action was taken. Defendants with only a transient presence at the time of the action are also considered to have been in the foreign court's jurisdiction. For corporations, the test is whether the company was headquartered, had an office, or was carrying on business in the jurisdiction.

===== Submission =====
The test for proving the defendant's submission to the foreign court consists of two separate branches: attornment and agreement.

The usual test for submission is whether the defendant attorned, that is, appeared in court to make an argument on the substantive merits of the case, in which case he or she is considered to have voluntarily submitted to the court. Appearing merely to contest the court's jurisdiction is generally not considered submission. If a defendant combines a jurisdictional challenge with substantive arguments, they will also be held to have submitted.

If the parties were subject to a contract that contained a forum selection clause, and the plaintiff obtained a judgment by suing in the specified jurisdiction, the defendant will be held to have submitted to the court's jurisdiction, and a Canadian court will enforce the judgment.

===== Real and substantial connection =====
Recognized by the Supreme Court in Morguard, the real and substantial test is also used by Canadian courts to determine jurisdiction outside of the recognition and enforcement context. The court's decision was based on the principles of comity. The real and substantial connection doctrine has subsequently become the dominant test for whether Canadian courts recognize and enforce foreign judgments. The original doctrine from Morguard only applied to inter-provincial judgments within Canada. However, the 2003 case Beals v Saldhana expanded the test to apply to international judgments. The definition of "real and substantial" is interpreted broadly in order to maintain flexibility for courts. In Beals, the Supreme Court further clarified that the real and substantial connection should be between the jurisdiction of the foreign court and either the subject matter or the defendant.

===== Types of judgments =====
Traditionally, only non-foreign monetary judgments were enforced. These judgments had to be for a fixed sum of money stemming from a final decision and could not be for a fine or penalty of the foreign state.

The ruling of the Supreme Court in Pro Swing Inc v Elta Golf Inc allowed non-monetary judgments to also be enforced in Canada at the enforcing court's discretion. When deciding whether to enforce a foreign non-monetary judgment, courts consider the same factors Canadian courts do when creating equitable orders, including:

- Are the terms of the order clear and specific enough to ensure that the defendant will know what is expected from him or her?
- Is the order limited in its scope and did the originating court retain the power to issue further orders?
- Is the enforcement the least burdensome remedy for the Canadian justice system?
- Is the Canadian litigant exposed to unforeseen obligations?
- Are any third parties affected by the order?
- Will the use of judicial resources be consistent with what would be allowed for domestic litigants?

==== Defences ====
Once the foreign court has been found to have had jurisdiction, the defendant may raise defences to the enforcement of the foreign judgment. However, these defences strictly concern whether the order shall be enforced, and are not about the merits of the case the judgment originated from.

===== Fraud =====
Foreign judgments obtained by fraud will generally not be enforced. In this context fraud is divided into two categories: misleading the foreign court to believe it has jurisdiction ("extrinsic fraud") or fraud going to the merits of the case ("intrinsic fraud"). Because of the importance of jurisdiction in the recognition and enforcement context, if evidence of fraud having to do with jurisdiction is accepted by the Canadian court, the judgment will not be enforced.

Fraud that has to do with the merits of the case will only justify setting aside a judgment if the evidence about the fraud presented to the Canadian court is new and was not previously adjudicated. The defence of fraud will only be accepted by a Canadian court if the defendant can prove that the fraud could not have been discovered by the use of reasonable due diligence before the foreign judgment was issued.

===== Denial of natural justice =====
Foreign judgments will not be enforced if it is proven on a balance of probabilities that the foreign court did not follow Canadian standards of fair process. Fair process includes an independent judiciary, the defendant's right to be notified of claims against them and their right to submit a defence.

===== Public policy =====
Foreign judgments created by laws that violate the fundamental morals underlying Canada's legal system will not be enforced. This would include laws that confiscate property based on religious or racial grounds, as well as a foreign court that has been proven to be corrupt. However, the mere fact that foreign policies produce outcomes that are different from Canada's is not in itself a reason to deny enforcement. This defence is very narrowly construed and is almost never applied.

==== Statutes ====
Every common law province in Canada has enacted legislation that allows for registration of judgments from other jurisdictions; most of these statutes are based on model legislation drafted and continually updated by the Uniform Law Conference of Canada. The provincial statutes operate alongside the common law in this area and do not replace it. Thus, plaintiffs can choose which process to use. The statutes differ by province; some only deal with inter-provincial judgments while others allow international judgments. They also differ on whether they allow non-pecuniary judgments. The defences to jurisdiction are generally the same as those in the common law.

Some provincial registration provisions use more traditional rules than the common law. New Brunswick's Foreign Judgments Act, which enables the registration of judgments from outside of Canada, does not include the real and substantial connection test as a basis for a foreign court's jurisdiction. It also restricts registration to final monetary judgments, excluding injunctive orders.

The Court Jurisdiction and Proceedings Transfer Act is in force in Nova Scotia, Saskatchewan and British Columbia, which alters the analysis of the enforcing court's jurisdiction. In an action to enforce a foreign judgment, a real and substantial connection between the province and the subject of the action is presumed to exist.

=== England and Wales ===
In England and Wales, three avenues of enforcement methods and recognition rules exist:

- Statutory registration of foreign judgments regarding European Union member states through Brussels Recast Regulation (withdrawn as of 1 January 2021).
- Statutory application of foreign states which are party to bilateral treaties.
- Common law rules for foreign states which do not fall into the above categories.

Judgments operating in personam, such as those not relating to in rem property rights, are only recognised as effective against particular parties; the material question becomes whether the judgment debtor is bound to abide to the judgment. It is recognised as binding on and against the party against whom it was given only if it was delivered by a court which, according to English law, was competent to deliver a judgment. Jurisdictional rules with regard to the foreign court are irrelevant. It is thus crucial for the court to determine whether the adjudicating court's own standards for recognition are satisfied by the facts; the adjudicating court must be satisfied not that the foreign court bears jurisdiction under its own rules, but whether, in the eyes of the English court, the foreign court has an "international jurisdiction" competence. Once the court has been satisfied that it is right to recognise a foreign judgment as settled, known as res judicata, the party may then seek to enforce the foreign judgment. In order for a judgment to be considered res judicata, it must be final and conclusive in the court which pronounced it.

Enforcement, as will be seen, is about collecting a debt. To be enforceable, a judgment must be recognised and must be a judgment for a fixed sum of money. In England and Wales, only money judgments with settled amounts are capable of being enforceable. English courts do not enforce foreign judgments, and a judgment creditor must bring a cause of action under English law and use the recognised foreign judgment to serve as conclusive evidence of an outstanding debt. The judgment must be on the merits, as held in The Sennar No 2 [1985] 1 WLR 490.

There are two purposes for effecting recognition of a foreign judgment. Firstly, if a party defeats a foreign case, he may seek recognition of that decision to estop a party from bringing another action against him in England. By contrast, should a party succeed in a foreign action, he may seek to enforce the action in England. The judgment creditor need not have to succeed at every point within the foreign action. It had previously been the case that if the foreign claimant had been partially successful, he was entitled to sue on the cause in action again within England. Section 34 of the Civil Jurisdiction Judgment Act 1982 was subsequently passed by parliament to remove the right to sue a second time.

A court's judgment is an exercise of sovereign power; it is this principle that underpins the English position that no foreign judgment will have an effect in England and, conversely, that the English courts cannot expect an English judgment to have any effect abroad. Exceptions to the limitation on foreign judgments are set out through parliament.

Until 2021, the Brussels Recast Regulation operated as the primary procedural scheme relating to foreign judgments, their recognition and enforcement. Recognition was automatic between member states, barring exceptions set out in Chapter III of the regulation. This is consistent with the EU principles of a single economic market where courts and government departments can be trusted to get things right. The Regulation ceased to be law in the United Kingdom as a consequence of Brexit. Under the common law, recognition is limited to a certain set of criteria.

As adjudication is considered a sovereign act, the common law has developed the concept of comity to determine circumstances where recognition and enforcement acknowledged and respected the foreign sovereign act sufficiently to enforce it domestically. This was pioneered in Hilton v Guyot. A judgment may therefore be reduced to four components:

- The foreign judgment has no force, as a judgment, outside the place it was given because adjudication is an act of sovereign power;
- Comity favours giving effect to foreign judgments and the question then is as to which foreign judgments ought to be recognised;
- If the parties have had a full and proper trial before a reasonable court, the judgment is accepted at face value as res judicata;
- If the law of the court which has adjudicated would not accept an equivalent judgment at face value, it will not enjoy reciprocity.

Reciprocity is not the central tenet of recognition, but rather it is suggested that it is the doctrine of obligation. This sits at the apex of an interplay between sovereignty, comity, consent, and reciprocity. Accepting reciprocity would allow foreign judgments to shape the English common law. By contrast, Adams v Cape Industries plc specifically rejected comity as the basis for recognition or non-recognition of judgments because it was insufficiently hard-edged for the demands. However, comity remains valuable for examining the doctrine of recognition insofar as it underpins the principle that a domestic court cannot examine the substantive validity of the foreign court's action – as it cannot claim to hold more competence – nor does it pretend that it must enforce the foreign court's decision.

Comity for the sovereignty of courts is insufficient for enforcing recognition because does not consistently determine a stringent enough rule for when sovereignty is to be accepted as a proper application onto the parties and when it is not recognised on the grounds that the parties ought not to be bound. The Canadian approach, set forth in Beals v Saldanha, was one of a more open enforcement of foreign judgments by enforcing the foreign judgment if the foreign jurisdiction can be determined (by the Canadian court) as being the natural forum for the resolution of the dispute, or that there was a real and substantial connection between the foreign jurisdiction and the dispute. This is a substantial deviation from the English approach, and one that, in the English context, would bring forth more problems than it would solve. By contrast, the doctrine of obligation, engaged between the two adjudicating parties, underpins the English approach. It focuses on the action of the defendant, whereas the Canadian approach does not focus on the defendant's action.

==== Common law recognition rules ====
The first of two broad bases for recognition within the Common law rules in England and Wales is set forth in Adams v Cape Industries plc. Where a party was present within the territory of the adjudicating court when proceedings instituted, the court will bind the party to the decision of the court so long as the adjudications are recognised as conclusive. The question of whether the judgment will be enforced will be a separate matter. Secondly, if a party is shown to have agreed with his opponent, by word or action, to abide by the judgment of the court, private agreement is sufficient for recognising the substance of the judgment as res judicata. Only English judgments are recognised in England, if the foreign court is competent, under English rules, and there is no defence to recognition, then the foreign judgment will be recognised and enforced. If a claimant wants to use the foreign judgment as a sword, then he will need to bring new proceedings in English common law using the foreign judgment as evidence to his claim.

The rules cannot and do not distinguish foreign courts with a reputation for excellence and foreign courts with less rigorous standards. Under the common law rules, the English court will not recognise judgments unless they are held to be final in their court of origin. This means that the matter cannot be reopened by the court which made the ruling. The matter may be subject to an ordinary appeal, but that will not be determined as a court reopening a matter. An interlocutory matter may be recognised if it represents the final word of the court on the point in issue. A difficulty arises in relation to default judgments which will often be liable to re-opening in the court in which they were entered.

English courts form the basis of recognition on:

- Presence; meaning that the defendant was present in the foreign jurisdiction when proceedings began; or
- Submission; that the defendant to a foreign adjudication submitted to accept the foreign court's adjudication.

Nationality is no longer credible reasoning for recognition of foreign judgments.

===== Present when proceedings were begun =====
The first category of recognition is where the defendant was present when proceedings began. Two primary definitions exist: one relating to individuals, the second to corporations. Academic criticism has extended from the use of presence rather than residence; however, residence on the date of when proceedings were begun creates uncertainty. It is difficult to determine whether a party who spends two years aboard is resident there. However, authority suggests that residence without presence at the material time would still suffice if the relevant time was at the service of process representing the start of legal proceedings. The leading authority within is Adams v Cape Industries, setting out that presence, as distinct from residence is necessary.

With regard to individuals, the court has held that it will mean that the defendant must be within the jurisdiction of a court when the proceedings were instituted, meaning service or notice that proceedings had begun. Presence at the time of the trial is not used as a defendant could simply leave the jurisdiction upon becoming aware. By contrast, in Adams v Cape the question of whether a company was present was to analogise from the reasoning of human beings. The court must be either able to determine presence as (a) servants of the corporation carrying on its business from a fixed place maintained by the corporation, or (b) a representative of the corporation carrying on the business of the corporation from a fixed place. Either of these criteria will determine the company is present. This is designed to prevent the argument that the company is present wherever a company officer or director is present. If the representative/servant has the power to bind the corporation into a contract without seeking approval from other entities abroad, presence will be determined. The difficulty of determining presence of a company derives primarily because it is difficult to apply to the margins. Travelling salesmen certainly operate in jurisdictions on behalf of companies, enjoying the benefit of economic markets, and under the current criteria would not be considered "present". The U.S. model operates on the assumption that the conclusion of any contract will bind the corporation in that jurisdiction. Further, the common law's ignorance as to the content of the judgment itself. This was seen notably in Adams v Cape itself. The effect of corporate presence is that any claim relating whatsoever can be brought against the corporation, regardless of the work the corporation conducts within the jurisdiction.

===== Not present but agreed to accept the adjudication of the foreign court =====
The second criterion where a party may be subject to a foreign judgment recognised in England is where the defendant has accepted the foreign court. This is consistent with the English courts' approach to a choice of jurisdiction clause: a judgment will be denied recognition at common law if the adjudicating court failed to give effect to a choice of court clause or arbitration agreement. A party will not sufficiently submit to a jurisdiction by simply agreeing to a contract in a foreign jurisdiction. If, for example, parties "A" and "B" agreed to be bound to a contract which included the terms "this contract shall be governed by the law of England and Wales and the English courts shall have exclusive jurisdiction to decide matters arising from the contract", both parties will be unable to commence proceedings in New York, even if the New York court considers the exclusive jurisdiction clause to be invalid. If "A" brings proceedings, the English court will not recognise the judgment of a New York court regardless of whether "B" attends the foreign jurisdiction to contest the jurisdiction of the New York court. Section 33 of the Civil Jurisdiction and Judgments Act 1982 altered the previous common law approach. It provided a defence to attending a foreign court for the purposes of challenging the jurisdiction of the court. There is considerable academic debate as to whether, after the foreign court determines jurisdiction, party "B" can continue to forward a defence so long as he contests jurisdiction at every opportunity. In doing so, the defendant may well have the opportunity to enjoy two attempts at defending the action, first seeking to defend the action abroad, and secondly operating with the confidence that they will be protected by Section 33 of the 1982 Act.

===== Defences to English recognition =====
Should a defendant seek to defend against recognition of a foreign judgment, several defences exist which might prevent the English court from recognising the action. The primary gateway for defending recognition in the English courts is that of fraud, which is said to unravel all foreign judgments. A judgment will be denied recognition as res judicata and there can therefore be no question of its enforcement if any of the defences allowed by English international private law are made out. The English court does not review the merits of the foreign judgment. One cannot claim that the foreign court failed to consider facts. It is also not possible to argue that the foreign court reached the wrong decision on the facts. The court is further not concerned with the competence of the issuing court. Six possible defences exist:

- Disregard of arbitration or choice of court agreements
- Lack of local jurisdiction
- Fraud
- Breach of procedural fairness
- Public policy
- Prior English judgment

==== Common law enforcement ====
The only foreign judgment which can be enforced in England is a money judgment for which a party will sue on the debt. Should a foreign court apply specific performance, a party may sue in England on the same cause of action as the foreign judgment and use the foreign judgment on the merits to seek a similar order from the English courts. It is the obligation, not the judgment, that is enforced. Only final judgments for fixed sums of money can be enforced. A foreign country court has jurisdiction to give a judgment in personam in four cases. Murthy v Sivajothi [1993] 1 WLR 467 upheld the recognition of res judicata.

1. The English court only had jurisdiction to enforce the judgment if the defendant had submitted to the jurisdiction of the foreign court by voluntarily appearing in those proceedings. It was necessary, for the plaintiff to establish under English law that the defendant had expressly authorised the acceptance of the service of proceedings. On the evidence it was possible that the defendant might not have realised that the proceedings were against him personally as guarantor.
2. Issue estoppel could in principle arise from an interlocutory judgment of a foreign court on a procedural or non-substantive issue where certain conditions were fulfilled. Express submission of the procedural or jurisdictional issue to the foreign court was required. The specific issue of fact must have been raised before and decided by the foreign court. Caution was to be exercised before any issue estoppel could in practice be found to arise
3. No issue estoppel in fact arose because it was not sufficiently clear that the specific issue which arose for consideration in the UK was same as that identified and decided in the foreign court. In the Arizona courts the plaintiff had relied upon a rule of Arizona procedural law which had no counterpart in the UK. Further the Arizona Court of Appeal had considered whether or not the defendant had given the necessary authority in a wider context that was relevant for those purposes under English law.
4. The defendant had been initially less than frank in relation to the narrow issue on which his defence turned. In the circumstances it was therefore appropriate to grant leave to defend conditional upon the payment of $100,000 into court within 28 days.

==== Bilateral treaties ====
Two parliamentary acts enforce jurisdictional rules. In particular, these apply to Commonwealth matters and operate close to the current common law. The first is the Administration of Justice Act 1920 where Part II applies to former colonial jurisdictions such as New Zealand, Nigeria, and Singapore. If the judgment is still subject to an appeal in the ordinary, it cannot be registered. The second parliamentary statute which allows for enforcement and recognition is the Foreign Judgments (Reciprocal Enforcement) Act 1933, which enforces civil and commercial matters from designated courts in countries with bilateral agreements, such as Canada. Instead of it being necessary to commence original proceedings by service, the statutes allow the judgement creditor, the party seeking to enforce a foreign jurisdiction, to merely register the judgment for direct enforcement. This produces the same effect as if the foreign action had been an English judgment. Respondents may apply to set aside the registration as specified by the statutory instruments.

=== Brussels Recast Regulation ===
Succeeding the Brussels I Regulation, the Brussels Recast Regulation allocates jurisdiction between member states using Chapters I and II of the regime. Chapter III of the Recast Regulation implements articles relating to the automatic recognition and enforcement of Member State judgments.

Except in very limited circumstances, it is not possible to claim that the court should not have adjudicated because it misinterpreted the rules on jurisdiction within Brussels. This is because jurisdiction rules are the same in all member states under the regulation. If the defendant thought that the foreign court was wrong, it should have, and could have, challenged jurisdiction at the first instance.

The Brussels Regime does not apply to the United Kingdom after 1 January 2021 due to the UK's withdrawal from the European Union.

== Enforcement of foreign arbitration awards in the U.S. ==
Arbitration awards enjoy the protection of special treaties. The U.S. is a signatory to international conventions regulating the enforcement of arbitration awards, including the Convention on the Recognition and Enforcement of Foreign Arbitral Awards (often referred to as the "New York Convention"), and the Inter-American Convention on International Commercial Arbitration, 14 I.L.M. 336 (1975). Ratified treaties in the U.S. are considered the "supreme law of the land".
