= Beals v Saldanha =

- Supreme Court of Canada

Hearing: 20 February 2003 Judgment: 18 December 2003
- Full case name: Geoffrey Saldanha, Leueen Saldanha and Dominic Thivy v. Frederick H. Beals III and Patricia A. Beals
- Citations: [2003] 3 S.C.R. 416, 2003 SCC 72
- Docket No.: 28829
- Prior history: Judgment for Beals in the Court of Appeal for Ontario
- Ruling: Appeal dismissed.

Holding
- The "real and substantial connection" test should apply to conflict of law issues related to recognition and enforcement of non-Canadian judgments.

Court membership
- Chief Justice: Beverley McLachlin; Puisne Justices: Charles Gonthier, Frank Iacobucci, John C. Major, Michel Bastarache, Ian Binnie, Louise Arbour, Louis LeBel, Marie Deschamps

Reasons given
- Majority: Major J. (paras. 1–80), McLachlin C.J. and Gonthier, Bastarache, Arbour and Deschamps JJ. concurring
- Dissent: Binnie J. (paras. 81–131), Iacobucci J. concurring
- Dissent: LeBel J. (paras. 132–267)

Beals v Saldanha is a decision of the Supreme Court of Canada on the conflict of laws, where the court established the requirements to enforce foreign judgments in Canada. The court held that foreign judgments were enforceable in Canada where there was a "real and substantial connection" between the foreign jurisdiction and the subject matter giving rise to the claim.

== Background ==
Geoffrey and Leueen Saldanha and Dominic Thivy were residents of Ontario and sold lots they owned in Florida to Frederick and Patricia Beals. Beals brought an action against Saldanha and Thivy when it was discovered that the defendants did not actually own the property they sold. A defence was filed with the court but did nothing afterwards and defaulted. A jury awarded Beals $260,000 in damages.

Thivy and Saldanha were informed by a lawyer in Ontario that the judgment could not be enforced and so they did nothing. Soon Beals brought an action in Ontario to enforce the judgment, which had grown to $800,000 with interest. At trial the judgment was denied on the basis that the damages had been improperly assessed. On Appeal the court allowed the foreign judgment.

The issue before the Supreme Court was whether a judgment issued by a Court in Florida could be enforced in Ontario, and whether the defendant could seek refuge under section 7 of the Charter.

== Decision of the court ==
=== Majority ===
In a six to three decision, the court found that the judgment was enforceable. The court applied the "real and substantial connection" test from the earlier decision of Morguard v. De Savoye to the international context. The test requires the court to consider whether the subject-matter of the suit or the person involved had a "real and substantial" connection with the country. The court noted, however, that judgments with sufficient connection will not be enforced if they are contrary to Canadian public policy, contrary to natural justice, or obtained through fraud.

=== Dissent ===
Justice LeBel, in dissent, argued for a strengthening of the available defences. He noted that the result in this case was overly harsh and unfair by imposing an 800,000 judgment on an 8,000 property due to essentially bad luck. He proposed that the real and substantial connection test be modified in the international context to reflect the added hardships imposed on litigating in a foreign country.

In his view, the defences of fraud and natural justice should be broadened in international matters and an additional residual category should be allowed for injustices that do not easily fit into the main categories using what lower court called a "judicial sniff test".

LeBel pointed to a number of examples such as the Hague Conference on foreign judgments had proposed to grant domestic judges to lower foreign punitive damages. and the Loewen case, where a Mississippi jury awarded 500 million in damages against a BC company for anti-competitive practices.

== See also ==
- List of Supreme Court of Canada cases (McLachlin Court)
