= John Devereux, Lord of Munsley =

Anglo-Norman nobleman

- Born: 1250
- Died: 13 March 1316 (aged 65–66)
- Spouses: Joan de Eylesford; Eva
- Issue: John Devereux
- Father: Nicholas II Devereux of Chanston

John Devereux, Lord of Munsley, was a nobleman living during the reigns of Edward I and Edward II. The Devereux were a prominent knightly family along the Welsh Marches during the thirteenth century, and played an integral role in attempts to control the Welsh Marches during the thirteenth century.

== Ancestry ==
John Devereux was born in 1250, a younger son of Nicholas II Devereux of Chanston by his second wife, Joan. His father had supported the baronial cause towards the end of the Second Barons' War, and probably died following the Battle of Evesham. John would be required to redeem his inheritance in 1279 under the requirements of the Dictum of Kenilworth. On 29 September 1278 John Devereux filed a plea for the redemption of 2 carucates of land in Tatington, part of Bullinghope, and Clehonger from Nicholas le Archer. He demonstrated that his previous non-appearance was not grounds for denial as he had not been notified, and the redemption was granted. Nicholas le Archer redeemed the lands on 2 April 1279 following the receipt 22 pounds, 5 shillings and 6 pennies comprising rent for 3 years.

== Career ==
John Devereux was attached to the retinue of Humphrey de Bohun, 3rd Earl of Hereford, and probably participated in Edward I's Welsh wars during the 1270s. Following, the Treaty of Aberconwy in November 1277, John Devereux was granted quittance of the common summons in county Somerset on 27 March 1280. On 10 June 1280 he was provided protection with clause volumus while he was abroad in Ireland with William de Audley and others, and was granted quittance of the common summons in county Southampton on 6 October 1280. When fighting broke out again, it is expected that Devereux again participated in the campaign that ended with death of Llywelyn, and capture of Dafydd ap Gruffydd in June 1283.

On 11 June 1284 John Devereux was granted warranty on 1 messuage and a moiety of 1 virgate of land in Callow Hill (in Munsley). Ralph le Child of Upleadon acknowledged the tenements to be the right of John; and Devereux agreed to render to him 1 penny yearly at the feast of St Michael and perform for the chief lords all other services. For this John Devereux gave him 11 marks of silver.

In 1286 John Devereux was back in Gloucester where he witnessed documents for Reginald fitzPeter. When further rebellion broke out in Wales, Devereux was again granted on 23 July 1287 clause volumus while on the king's service in Wales. On 26 June 1289 John de le Ok, son of Miles de Sweyneston, acknowledged a debt to John Devereux of 11 pounds to be levied in default of payment of his lands and chattels in county Hereford. On 15 May 1290 John Devereux was one of the sureties for William de Mortimer, Parson of the Church of Eastham (Worcester), acknowledging the debt to Roger la Zouch of Lubbesthorpe of 80 pounds to be levied, in default of payment, of his lands and chattels in counties Worcester and Essex.

On 25 November 1287 Sibel, widow of William de Warham, remised and quitclaimed to John Devereux and his heirs 1 messuage and 1 virgate of land in Warham (in Breinton), excepting 6 acres of land. For this John gave her 10 pounds of silver.

On 1 July 1289 Margery de la Walls acknowledged tenements in Ledbury (Wall Hills and Plaistow), and Coddington to be the right of John Devereux, and rendered them to him and his heirs in court. Also Margery granted half a virgate and 6 acres of land and 10 shillings of rent, which Walter and Isabel (Note: This Isabel is probably John Devereux's half sister. See below in 1292) de la Walls held for the life of Isabel of the inheritance of Margery, to remain to John and his heirs. Margery further granted half a virgate of land, which Robert and Cecily de la Heath held in dower of Cecily of the inheritance of Margery, to remain to John and his heirs.

Also in September 1290 Devereux was called as witness in a court case contesting the ownership of 'Donewaldeslond' between the heirs of Philip of Wastellion and John de Hastings, 1st Baron Hastings. John Devereux testified that he knew the Welshman, and that his parents did too. He and his father often came to Philip's house, and heard that Philip had performed homage to the King for the contested land which had been held by Philip's ancestors. John also testified that the Welshman held of John de Hastings 3 bovates of land in other parts of Wales.

On 6 January 1291, John Devereux was listed among the men of the earl of Hereford who repelled the incursions of the earl of Gloucester's men from Wales in the proceedings held by the king to settle their private feud. A pardon was granted on 2 November 1291 to a group of Welshmen for their outlawry in Hereford and not appearing before the justices to answer John Devereux's accusation of trespassing. On 6 January 1292 John Devereux was taken into custody over these cross border raids along the Welsh Marches, and was ransomed by the Earl of Hereford.

In 1292, John's half-sister, Isabel, and her husband, brought a writ of waste against her stepmother, Joan, and Joan's second husband. This involved the felling of trees on land granted Joan in dower, and that was to revert to Isabel and John Devereux. John was questioned as to his reversion rights, which he indicated he had granted to Isabel. Joan held right to the tenements as the widow of Nicholas Devereux. The trees were ultimately determined to have fallen down as the result of ditches dug at the direction of Isabel.

On 22 December 1294, John Devereux was granted protection as a member of the retinue of Nicholas de Audley during service overseas. He sailed with the Earl of Lancaster in January 1295 on the expedition to reinforce Gascony. The expedition plundered Brittany, and then landed in Gascony. They advanced on Bordeaux 28 March 1295, but failed to take the town. Retiring to Bayonne, the earl of Lancaster died on 6 June 1295 and his forces returned to England.

In 1295 France and Scotland enter the Treaty of Paris, agreeing to mutual support in face of conflict with England, and subsequently termed the ‘Auld Alliance.’ Edward I tried to raise forces to pursue further war with France, but Bohun and other earls resisted this goal. In March 1297 Parliament was held at Salisbury, and Edward I pressed the issue, but events in Scotland changed his direction. As fighting broke out again, William Wallace sacked Lanark Castle in May 1297. On 5 August 1297 the King provided John Devereux with letters of protection for the next year while he is on the king's service overseas. William Wallace defeated the English at Stirling Bridge on 11 September 1297. Devereux gathered with the army for Edward I's invasion of Scotland, and was probably present at the Battle of Falkirk. On 7 June 1300 John Devereux, son of Nicholas Devereux, was granted Letters of Protection while serving in Scotland under John de Usflete. John de Usflete was the husband of Lora, daughter and coheir of Gerard de Furnivale. On 21 November 1301 John Devereux, yeoman, was granted letters of protection along with Nicholas le Archer who were staying on the king's service in Scotland.

John Devereux had returned to the Welsh marches in Spring of 1302. On 24 June 1302 John Devereux was granted a commission to investigate his complaint that individuals had besieged and entered his manor at Eastleach, Gloucester. They depastured his corn with their beasts, beat his servants (John le Machun and Laurence Sharp of Burton), and carried away jewels and other goods. On 8 December 1302 Devereux was nominated as attorney by Thomas St. John, who was going to Ireland for 2 years.

In May 1303 Edward I invaded Scotland again. On 7 May 1303 John Devereux was granted Letters of Protection for service in Scotland with Richard de Welles. On 4 February 1304 Scotland agrees to a peace treaty with Edward I, and 22 April 1304 the last holdout, Stirling Castle, was besieged, and it surrendered 2 months later.

On 1 October 1305 Ralph de Gorges, who had fought with Devereux in Scotland, nominated John Devereux as his attorney. On 25 August 1307 John Devereux received an exemption for life, on account of his old age and debility, from being put on juries, assizes or recognisances unless his presence be specially required.

After the death of John's half-brother, Hugh Devereux of Chanston, in 1307, the settlement of the ownership of Chanston manor was brought into court during the Easter Term 1308. Nicholas III Devereux of Chanston, John's nephew, and his coparceners (David le Seriaunt, John and Sarah Ragun with their son John, and Maud widow of Richard le Bret) claimed portions of the manor, and contested Hugh Devereux's grant to John and Eva Devereux. Nicholas III Devereux of Chanston claimed a third part of Chanston that he held at the time of Hugh's death. He showed evidence that Hugh had granted all his rights in this land that comprised the dower of Isabel, widow of Nicholas II Devereux of Chanston and mother of Hugh, in the village of Aynaldestone, and that this occurred prior to any grant to John Devereux. David le Serriaunt made claim to 5 acres that similarly Hugh had granted him. John and Eva Devereux countered that their grant came first. John and Sarah Ragun with their under-age son, John, put forward their claim of 6 marks of rent in the manor that they were to hold for 5 years. These issues were held over until the octave of Michaelmas (6 October 1308) Maud le Bret contested 12 acres of meadow that was granted by Hugh to the Raguns for life, which Hugh afterwards granted the reversion to Richard and Maud le Bret and their heirs (Richard le Bret Junior). These issues were further held over until the quindene of Easter (14 April 1309). Due to John, son of John and Sarah Ragun, being under-age, it was judged he could not attorn until he came of age.

== Marriage ==
John Devereux married Joan de Eylesford, the daughter of Walter de Eylesford before 1283. They had a son:

- John Devereux the Younger (Note: On 14 December 1314 a commission of oyer and terminer was granted for a complaint by Richard Dammory that John Devereux the Younger, Ralph de Gorges and others forcibly entered his close at Ubbele, county Somerset, broke his houses, burned a paling, felled some of his trees growing there, uprooted others, and carried away the trees and other goods of his. The complaint was changed because it was sealed at another time by a fine of 40 shillings, and the fine is enrolled. On 28 March 1321 protection was granted for 3 years to John Devereux while on the king’s service in Ireland with Ralph de Gorges. On 18 December 1324 dower was assigned to the widow of Ralph de Gorges, Eleanor. Her attorney for these proceedings was John Devereux. On 4 September 1325 protection was provided to John Devereux who was in the retinue of Hugh de Courtenay when he went with the king. On 1 November 1325, John, son and heir of John Devereux, enrolled a general release to Richard de Wynslade of all actions in all lands, rents, and services in Leche Turvyle (Eastleach, Gloucester). Among the witnesses was John le Machon who was identified as one of his father’s men in a complaint of 1302.)

John married a second time to a woman named Eva who survived him. They had no children.

== Lord of Munsley ==
John Devereux held the title of Lord of Munsley, and lands in Burton and Cranford, Northamptonshire. Burton Latimer (or Aylesford's Manor) comprised a third of the township of Burton. In 1242 it was held by Henry de Aldwinkle, probably only for life, and was obtained by Wischard Ledet when he relinquished his claim on the original manor of Burton to Alan de Dinant. His heir was his daughter, Christina, who married first Henry de Braybroc and second Gerard de Furnival. She outlived her eldest son, Wischard who took the name Ledet, and her grandson, Walter. Her heirs were her daughters, Alice (Agnes) and Christina (Christiana) de Furnival. Alice married John le Latimer, and Christina married William le Latimer. Christina, wife of Gerard de Furnival, died between 1266 and 1270, and Burton passed to her daughter, Christina, the wife of William Latimer. Beginning in 1273 the Latimers failed to send the 75 shillings from Burton required for the guard of Rockingham Castle.

William de Aylesford (or Eylesford) held Burton from the Latimer's for the rent of 1 ounce of silk or 12 shillings a year. On 14 October 1280 the inquisition post mortem of William de Eylesford of Burton showed him holding the manor of Burton. He was found not to be liable for the 75 shillings. On William de Eylessford death, Burton passed to his brother, Walter de Eylessford. Walter gave it and other tenements to his daughter, Joan, and her first husband. Following the death of her first husband without issue, Joan married John Devereux before 1283, and they had issue. John Devereux held ½ knights’ fee at Burton, and 1 hide of land at Cranford on the Roll of Fees of 1284.

When Walter de Eylesford died in 1292, Joan had already died. Gerard de Eylessford brought suit against his brother-in-law, John Devereux, over the tenements given to Joan. Gerard claimed the tenements by a writ of morte d’ancestor. (Note: An assize of mort d'ancestor was a writ filed when after the decease of a man's ancestor, a stranger abated and entered into the estate.) Gerard, who was underage at the time, protested that his father, Walter, had held the property at his death, and John had no right to it after the death of Joan de Eylessford. John Devereux attested that they were given to Joan and her heirs during her first marriage. As that marriage was without issue, it passed to John with their marriage, and now should go to their issue, John Devereux Junior. The judgment was for John Devereux.

Following the judgment for Devereux, he would hold this title for the remainder of his life. In 19 March 1307 John Devereux, identified as Lord of Munsley, loaned Thomas, son of Thomas fitzAlan, of Burton 20L.

== Death ==
John Devereux died on 13 March 1316, and an inquiry post-mortem was held on 4 April 1316 at Northampton. At this inquiry it was claimed that Devereux held Burton and Cranford by a grant for life from the heirs of Gerard de Furnivalle with reversion to Gerard de Eylesford. He was noted to have no other lands in this area. In April 22, Lord John Waleweyn, escheator, was instructed not to meddle further with the lands held by John Devereux as inquisition showed he held no land of the king in-chief.

The Burton properties remained in the possession of the Devereux family , likely due to the presence of a son, John Devereux the Younger, born to Joan de Eylesford. However, the lands were included in the dower of John Devereux the Elder’s second wife, Eva.

Following the death of John Devereux the Younger around 1328 without an heir, Eva’s claim to the estates lapsed. Edmund de Eylesford subsequently sought their return. On 27 September 1328, Edmund de Eylesford, son of Gerard de Eylesford, appeared before the court to recover his lands at Burton and Cranford, which had previously been lost in a legal dispute with Eva, widow of John Devereux. That same year, Margery, widow of Gerard de Eylesford, also submitted a similar claim. The case was decided in their favour, and the estates were restored to them.

== General References ==
- A History of the County of Gloucester: Volume 7, ed. N. M. Herbert (Oxford, 1981). Pages 61–69, Eastleach Turville. accessed 16 January 2016.
- Page, William (editor). A History of the County of Northampton: Volume 3. (London, 1930). Pages 180-186, Parishes: Burton Latimer. accessed 16 January 2016.
