= Real and substantial connection =

In Canadian law, a real and substantial connection or the real and substantial connection test is a legal principle used to determine whether a subject matter falls within a jurisdiction. The phrase was first adopted in Canada in the Supreme Court of Canada decision of Libman v. The Queen (1985). It is used in several circumstances in matters of conflict of laws.

== Enforcement of foreign judgments ==
The test is primarily used to determine whether a Canadian court will recognize a foreign judgment where there was service ex juris. Courts will usually recognize a judgment from a foreign province or nation where the claimant shows that there is a real and substantial connection between the subject matter of the litigation or the damages suffered and the jurisdiction issuing the judgment.

The foreign judgment must be final and the foreign court no longer has any power to change or rescind it.

== Jurisdiction ==
When a claimant wishes to bring an action to a Canadian court, the Court must be satisfied that it has jurisdiction over the matter. Jurisdiction in personam is determined using the real and substantial connection test.

In SOCAN v. CAIP (2004), the Supreme Court of Canada applied the R&S connection test to determine the location of a breach of copyright in the context of peer to peer downloading. In Club Resorts Ltd v Van Breda (2012), the Supreme Court applied the test to determine civil jurisdiction in the face of a conflict of laws.
