= Attornment =

Property law concept

Attornment (from French tourner, "to turn"), in English real property law, is the acknowledgment of a new lord by the tenant on the alienation of land. Under the feudal system, the relations of landlord and tenant were to a certain extent reciprocal. So it was considered unreasonable to the tenant to subject him to a new lord without his own approval, and it thus came about that alienation could not take place without the consent of the tenant. Attornment was also extended to all cases of lessees for life or for years. The necessity for attornment was abolished by the Administration of Justice Act 1705.

== Background ==
In mortgages, an attornment clause is a clause whereby the mortgagor attorns tenant to the mortgagee, thus giving the mortgagee the right to distrain, as an additional security.

As used in modern legal transactions, the term attornment refers to an acknowledgment of the existence of the relationship of landlord and tenant. A tenant often has the duty under the tenant's lease, particularly in commercial leases, to provide an attornment upon request, and is required by a creditor or potential buyer of property from the landlord to establish the nature of existing encumbrances on and income streams flowing from a property, as an element of the due diligence process associated with the transaction. Frequently, a tenant must declare the existence of any outstanding disputes with the landlord at the time the attornment is executed and waives any dispute not declared at that time.

A request for an attornment from a tenant which is refused can be used by a landlord as a basis for establishing grounds for eviction on the grounds of insecurity that the lease will be honored, or the existence of an actual case or controversy suitable for resolution in a declaratory judgment action.

Attornment in commercial real estate is generally used in the context of a subordination, non-disturbance and attornment agreement (SNDA), which protects both the tenant and the lender in the event the landlord defaults on its commercial lending obligations. The lease remains in full force and effect.
