= Comity =

Respect for acts between political entities

In law, comity is "a principle or practice among political entities such as countries, states, or courts of different jurisdictions, whereby legislative, executive, and judicial acts are mutually recognized." It is an informal and non-mandatory courtesy to which a court of one jurisdiction affords to the court of another jurisdiction when determining questions where the law or interests of another country are involved. Comity is founded on the concept of sovereign equality among states and is expected to be reciprocal.

== Etymology ==
The term comity was derived in the 16th century from the French comité, meaning association and from the Latin cōmitās, meaning courtesy and from cōmis, friendly, courteous.

Comity may also be referred to as judicial comity or comity of nations.

== History of comity (13th to 19th centuries) ==
The doctrine of international comity has been described variously "as a choice-of-law principle, a synonym for private international law, a rule of public international law, a moral obligation, expediency, courtesy, reciprocity, utility, or diplomacy. Authorities disagree on whether comity is a rule of natural law, custom, treaty, or domestic law. Indeed, there is not even agreement that comity is a rule of law at all." Because the doctrine touches on many different principles, it is regarded as "one of the more confusing doctrines evoked in cases touching upon the interests of foreign states." The principle of comity has been questioned and even rejected by many scholars throughout the years; however, the use of the term remains present in case law.

European jurists have been wrestling with the decision to apply foreign law since the thirteenth century. As the popularity of commerce outside of the locality grew, the need to find a new way to resolve conflicts of law issues arose. The preexisting system known as statutism became too complex and arbitrary to keep up with the societal values of the time.

A group of Dutch jurists created the doctrine of international comity in the late seventeenth century, most prominently Ulrich Huber. Huber and others sought a way to handle conflicts of law more pragmatically to reinforce the idea of sovereign independence. At the core of his ideas surrounding comity was the respect of one sovereign nation for another. Huber wrote that comitas gentium ("civility of nations") required the application of foreign law in certain cases because sovereigns "so act by way of comity that rights acquired within the limits of a government retain their force everywhere so far as they do not cause prejudice to the powers or rights of such government or of their subjects." Huber "believed that comity was a principle of international law" but also that "the decision to apply foreign law itself was left up to the state as an act of free will."

Huber did not believe comity was a stand-alone principle but rather saw it as a basis for establishing rules and doctrines of law. At the time of its initiation in the common law, comity was an attractive principle as the United States and England were in search of fundamental principle by which they could have nonconflictual law rules.

A century after Huber, Lord Mansfield, Chief Justice of the Court of King's Bench in England for three decades, introduced the doctrine of comity to English law. Lord Mansfield viewed the application of comity as discretionary, with courts applying foreign law "except to the extent that it conflicted with principles of natural justice or public policy." He demonstrated this principle in Somerset v Stewart (King's Bench 1772), which held that slavery was so morally odious that a British court would not recognize the property rights of an American slaveholder in his slave out of comity. English courts and scholars adopted Lord Mansfield's ideas on comity, which provided a new means for courts to recognize foreign law where the application of English law would lead to injustices.

Comity was most famously introduced to the American common law by the American jurist Justice Joseph Story in the early nineteenth century. Much like Huber, Story sought to develop a new system of private international law that reflected the new commercial needs of the United States. Similar to Lord Mansfield, Story stressed the importance of justice in comity and that comity is a stand-alone principle that derives from mutual benefit. Story's view, which ultimately prevailed, was that the consensual or voluntary application of comity doctrine would foster trust among states, "localize the effect of slavery", and reduce the risk of civil war.

In the mid-nineteenth century, John Westlake advanced further the idea that states ought to act with comity for reasons of justice in his Treatise on Private International Law. Westlake is praised for adopting Huber's comity in English law; he rejected Story's approach. Westlake states that conflict rules are an instance of domestic sovereignty, and therefore the duty to recognize foreign law must be found as a reason within English law itself.

== Modern approaches to comity by legal system ==
=== United States ===
In the law of the United States, the Comity Clause is another term for the Privileges and Immunities Clause of the Article Four of the United States Constitution, which provides that "The Citizens of each State shall be entitled to all Privileges and Immunities of Citizens in the several States." Article Four as a whole—which includes the Privileges and Immunities Clause, the Extradition Clause, and the Full Faith and Credit Clause—has been described as the "interstate comity" article of the Constitution.

In the case of Bank of Agusta v Earl, the court adopted Justice Joseph Story's doctrine of comity. At the end of the nineteenth century, the US Supreme Court delivered the classic statement on comity in the decision of Hilton v. Guyot (1895). The court stated that the enforcement of a foreign judgment was a matter of comity is viewed as the "classic" statement of comity in international law. The Court held in that case:

"Comity", in the legal sense, is neither a matter of absolute obligation, on the one hand, nor of mere courtesy and good will, upon the other. But it is the recognition which one nation allows within its territory to the legislative, executive or judicial acts of another nation, having due regard both to international duty and convenience, and to the rights of its own citizens or of other persons who are under the protection of its laws.

This case continues to be the leading case cited by American courts when articulating the doctrine of comity. It is an important decision for the country as it articulates the definition of comity and does so in a more broad way than previously. Despite the broad definition in Hilton v Guyot, the court refused to enforce the French judgment based on reciprocity, as France would not have enforced an equivalent judgment. This decision differed from Justice Joseph Story's idea of comity as his idea of comity was concerned with sovereign interests and was rather concerned with reciprocity.

The United States faced significant advancement in its global standing as a military and economic power after the Second World War, and this transformed the principle of comity into something that more closely resembled an obligation to apply foreign law. After the Cold War, the Supreme Court heard the case of Hartford Fire Insurance Co v California. In this case, Justice Souter gave the opinion that one only considers comity where there is a "true conflict between domestic and foreign law". In the dissent, Justice Scalia argues that extraterritorial jurisdiction must consider international comity to ensure international law is not violated. More than ten years later, the Supreme Court heard the decision of F. Hoffman-La Roche, Ltd. v Empagran, S.A. where Justice Kennedy writing for the majority adopted Justice Scalia's dissent. The American doctrine provides a blueprint for an international concept of comity, in particular with regard to the evolution of universal norms in international commercial relations.

In the United States, certain foreign defamation judgments are not recognized under the SPEECH Act (a federal statute enacted in 2010), which supersedes the comity doctrine. The Act aims to stop "libel tourism".

==== Professional Licensure ====
In the United States, some states and territories recognize professional engineer licenses granted in a different jurisdiction, depending on the holder's education and experience (a practice called "licensure by comity"). Rules differ significantly from jurisdiction to jurisdiction.

=== England and Wales ===
By the end of the nineteenth century, comity had received judicial approval in English law as a foundational principle of private international law. In 1896, Professor Dicey published "Digest of the Law of England with Reference to the Conflict of Laws", which criticized the doctrine of comity on the basis that it is too vague, as it promotes the recognition of foreign laws depending on option.

Despite the debate in academia on the role of the principle of comity, the Supreme Court and the House of Lords have recognized the role of comity in England and Wales. However, the courts have yet to adopt a precise definition of comity. The case law indicates that comity is relevant in the consideration of what effect another state's laws or judicial power should have in England and Wales in a given case.

=== Canada (excluding Quebec) ===
Unlike the United States of America and Australia, the principle of comity or Full Faith and Credit of recognizing judgments across the country is not recognized in the Canadian constitution or other authoritative bases. However, beginning in the 1990s the courts started to discuss the principle of comity as it relates interprovincially and internationally in a series of cases and adopted the principle of comity as a critical feature underlying Canadian private international law.

Morguard Investments Ltd. v De Savoye was the first case in this series considering comity in Canadian law. The common law reflected the principle from England that one of the basic tenets of international law is that sovereign states have exclusive jurisdiction in their territory. Therefore, before this decision, Canadian courts were conservative in recognizing foreign judgments, including those obtained in other Canadian provinces' courts. Justice La Forest acknowledges that the common law approach is not grounded in the realities of modern times as states cannot live in complete isolation due to travel, flow of wealth, skills and people. Especially interprovincially, the Canadian Constitution was created to form a single country; therefore, there is no foundation for differential quality of justice in the Canadian judicial structure. In response to modern-day values, Justice LaForest notes the Supreme Court of the United States' approach to comity in Hilton v Guyot and explains that comity is a necessary principle to ensure order and fairness in modern-day transactions. Still, it is not a matter of absolute obligation but rather a voluntary matter based on common interests. Comity is not only based on respect for foreign sovereignty but also convenience and necessity, and the court held that the principle of comity called for a more liberal approach to foreign judgments. The court chose to revise the common law test and enforce a judgment with a "real and substantial connection" between the action or damages suffered and the adjudicating jurisdiction. This decision had important implications for both interprovincial and international litigations as Canadian courts began to engage with the comity in judgment enforcement.

The following case addressing comity was Hunt v T&N; the court elaborated on their decision in Morguard by stating that comity is "grounded in notions of order and fairness to participants". Hunt v T&N is not about enforcement of judgment but rather about the constitutional validity of provincial legislation and its effect on another province's legislation to the proceeding before it. In this case, the Supreme Court of Canada rewrote the rules on the extraterritorial effects of provincial legislation. These extraterritorial effects of provincial legislation will be assessed according to the principle of comity.

In the case of Tolofson v Jensen, the court answers the question of which law should govern in tort when the interest of more than one jurisdiction is involved. The court determines that the law of where the tort occurred should apply, this is known as lex loci delicti. Justice La Forest clearly reaffirmed the importance of comity in private international law in the decision. The court states that the choice of law is where the tort occurred for reasons of comity, order and fairness. The court states that international comity helps ensure "harmony" in the face of potential conflicts of law.

=== Australia ===
The Australian Constitution recognizes that the Full Faith and Credit should be afforded by the Commonwealth and each state to all other Australian states:

"Full faith and credit shall be given, throughout the Commonwealth, to the laws, the public Acts and records, and the judicial proceedings of any State."

In case law, the High Court of Australia has never defined the meaning of comity in Australian law. However, the High Court has adopted and approved the definition of comity from the United States Supreme Court in Hilton v Guyot, with the first reference to it being in 1999 in the decision of Lipohar v The Queen. Comity has played an important role in the development and application of Australian private law. It has been used by courts most frequently in navigating sovereign sensitivities and economic realities.

=== European Union ===
The Brussels 1 Regulation requires that the judgment of the court of one member states of the European Union (absence non-consenting defendants) shall be enforced by the court of another member state.

== See also ==
- Act of state doctrine
- Alien Tort Statute
- Conflicts of Law
- Enforcement of foreign judgments
- Forum non conveniens
- Lex loci
- Hartford Fire Insurance Co. v. California
- Sovereign immunity
- Universal jurisdiction
