= Hunt v T&N plc =

- Supreme Court of Canada

Hearing: October 7, 1992 Judgment: November 18, 1993
- Full case name: George Ernest Hunt Appellant v Lac d'Amiante du Québec Ltée, Asbestos Corporation Limited, Atlas Turner Inc., Bell Asbestos Mines Limited, JM Asbestos Inc., the Quebec Asbestos Mining Association and National Gypsum Co. and T&N, plc, Carey Canada Inc., Flintkote Mines Limited and The Flintkote Co.
- Citations: Hunt v. T&N plc, 1993 CanLII 43 (SCC), [1993] 4 SCR 289; 109 DLR (4th) 16; [1994] 1 WWR 129; 85 BCLR (2d) 1
- Docket No.: 22637
- Prior history: APPEAL from a judgment of the British Columbia Court of Appeal Hunt v. Lac d'Amiante du Québec Ltée., 1991 CanLII 1035 (BC CA), (1991), 56 B.C.L.R. (2d) 365, 81 D.L.R. (4th) 763, [1991] 5 W.W.R. 475, 48 C.P.C. (2d) 247, 3 B.C.A.C. 138, 7 W.A.C. 138, affirming a judgment of Esson C.J.S.C. Hunt v. T & N, 1990 CanLII 1109 (BC SC), (1990), 43 B.C.L.R. (2d) 390, 67 D.L.R. (4th) 687, [1990] 3 W.W.R. 558, dismissing an application for an order compelling the production of documents.
- Ruling: Appeal allowed

Court membership
- Chief Justice: Antonio Lamer; Puisne Justices: Gérard La Forest, Claire L'Heureux-Dubé, John Sopinka, Charles Gonthier, Peter Cory, Beverley McLachlin, William Stevenson, Frank Iacobucci

Reasons given
- Unanimous reasons by: La Forest J.

Hunt v T&N plc, [1993] 4 S.C.R. 289 is a landmark decision of the Supreme Court of Canada on conflict of laws. The Court ruled that the Quebec law prohibiting the removal of company documents from the province was constitutionally inapplicable to a British Columbia court order. The decision was significant in that it affirmed much of the reasoning from Morguard Investments Ltd. v. De Savoye (1990) and further held that the principles first identified in Morguard are fundamental to the constitution.

== Background ==
George Hunt, a resident of British Columbia, was diagnosed with cancer caused by the inhalation of asbestos fibres from a product that was manufactured in Quebec. As part of his action in British Columbia he tried to get an order to retrieve documents from the manufacturer in Quebec. The Quebec Business Concerns Records Act prohibited the removal of documents outside of the province. Hunt attempted to challenge the law as unconstitutional.

Hunt attempted to argue that Morguard - which allowed for inter-provincial enforcement of orders - could equally apply for constitutional challenges.

This was the second appearance before the Supreme Court of Canada for this case. The Court had previously ruled on the question of where a statement of claim could be struck out for want of a reasonable claim, stating that striking out cannot be justified because a pleading reveals "an arguable, difficult or important point of law". On the contrary, it may well be critical that the action be allowed to proceed.

== Reasons of the court ==
The Court allowed Hunt's appeal, in a unanimous decision written by La Forest J. He held that:

- the Quebec prohibition on the removal of documents for litigation in BC was constitutionally inapplicable. The Act would remain in force but could not be applied against other provinces.
- courts may consider constitutional arguments in determining foreign law that incidentally arises in the course of litigation. A foreign court in making a finding of fact should not be bound to assume that the mere enactment of a statute necessarily means that it is constitutional.
- that both jurisdictions in question are part of the same Canadian federation and governed by the same Constitution reinforces and possibly augments the powers of the superior courts to consider the constitutional issues.
- the Supreme Court of Canada is not restricted to the identical powers and procedures of the lower courts from which an appeal is made.

=== Provincial courts in the Canadian federation ===
The nature of the inherent jurisdiction of the provincial superior courts was greatly expanded in Hunt, as noted in the judgment:

It may, no doubt, be advanced that courts in the province that enacts legislation have more familiarity with statutes of that province. It must not be forgotten, however, that courts are routinely called to apply foreign law in appropriate cases. It is thus only the fact that a constitutional issue is raised that differentiates this case. But all judges within the Canadian judicial structure must be taken to be competent to interpret their own Constitution. In a judicial system consisting of neutral arbiters trained in principles of a federal state and required to exercise comity, the general notion that the process is unfair simply is not legally sustainable, all the more so when the process is subject to the supervisory jurisdiction of this Court.

This approach is even more persuasive where, as here, the issue relates to the constitutionality of the legislation of a province that has extraprovincial effects in another province. This is especially true where the constitutionality of the other province's legislation has never been challenged in the other province's courts, and where moreover, as here, such a challenge is unlikely. Where the violation is as much a violation against the Constitution of Canada, then the superior courts which must legitimately face the issue should be able to deal with the question. Against this position, it was observed that most of the parties interested in the question as interveners would be in the province whose statute is impugned. That may be, but where the alleged violation relates to extraterritorial effect, many of the interested parties are also outside Quebec. Above all, it is simply not just to place the onus on the party affected to undertake costly constitutional litigation in another jurisdiction.

I agree that, because of the far-reaching impact of such rulings, the courts should restrict themselves to hearing constitutional challenges to the legislation of other provinces only where there is a real interest affected in their province. Unfortunately, there are intractable "chicken and egg" problems: if the extraterritorial effects of the law are themselves a prerequisite to the British Columbia court taking jurisdiction, then who is to determine that such extraterritorial effects exist in a particular case? The process must begin somewhere, and we must rely on the good sense of our superior courts in the respective provinces to not gratuitously assume jurisdiction.

=== The extension of Morguard ===
Hunt has attained great significance because of the manner in which it built upon the principles first expressed in Morguard. As noted by Laforest J:

Morguard was not argued in constitutional terms, so it was sufficient there to infuse the constitutional considerations into the rules that might otherwise have governed issues of enforcement and recognition of judgment. But the issue was very clearly raised in this case and in fact a constitutional question was framed. Now, as perusal of the last cited passage from Morguard reveals, the constitutional considerations raised are just that. They are constitutional imperatives, and as such apply to the provincial legislatures as well as to the courts, as the Attorney General for Ontario conceded and as a number of commentators have maintained.... In short, to use the expressions employed in Morguard, at p. 1100, the "integrating character of our constitutional arrangements as they apply to interprovincial mobility" calls for the courts in each province to give "full faith and credit" to the judgments of the courts of sister provinces. This, as also noted in Morguard, is inherent in the structure of the Canadian federation, and, as such, is beyond the power of provincial legislatures to override. This does not mean, however, that a province is debarred from enacting any legislation that may have some effect on litigation in other provinces or indeed from enacting legislation respecting modalities for recognition of judgments of other provinces. But it does mean that it must respect the minimum standards of order and fairness addressed in Morguard. I turn briefly then to the relevant principles after which I shall consider whether the statute impugned in this case offends these standards.

The basic thrust of Morguard was that in our federation a greater degree of recognition and enforcement of judgments given in other provinces was called for. Morguard was careful to indicate, however, that a court must have reasonable grounds for assuming jurisdiction. One must emphasize that the ideas of "comity" are not an end in themselves, but are grounded in notions of order and fairness to participants in litigation with connections to multiple jurisdictions.

In Morguard, a more accommodating approach to recognition and enforcement was premised on there being a "real and substantial connection" to the forum that assumed jurisdiction and gave judgment. Contrary to the comments of some commentators and lower court judges, this was not meant to be a rigid test, but was simply intended to capture the idea that there must be some limits on the claims to jurisdiction. Indeed I observed (at p. 1104) that the "real and substantial connection" test was developed in Indyka v. Indyka, [1969] 1 A.C. 33, in a case involving matrimonial status (where sound policy demands generosity in recognition), and that in a personal action a nexus may need to be sought between the subject-matter and the territory where the action is brought. I then considered the test developed in Moran v. Pyle National (Canada) Ltd., for products liability cases as an example of where jurisdiction would be properly assumed. The exact limits of what constitutes a reasonable assumption of jurisdiction were not defined, and I add that no test can perhaps ever be rigidly applied; no court has ever been able to anticipate all of these. However, though some of these may well require reconsideration in light of Morguard, the connections relied on under the traditional rules are a good place to start. More than this was left to depend on the gradual accumulation of connections defined in accordance with the broad principles of order and fairness.... But I think that the general approach was solidly based.

== See also ==
- List of Supreme Court of Canada cases (Lamer Court)
